= The Roy Files =

- Title card
- Genre: Comedy drama Mockumentary
- Starring: Jason Cullen; Simon Delaney; Cathy Belton; Martha Byrne; Mark Lambert; Valerie O'Connor
- Country of origin: Ireland
- Original language: English
- No. of seasons: 1
- No. of episodes: 15

Production
- Executive producers: Sue Nott; Alan Shannon; John Rice
- Production locations: Sandyford, County Dublin
- Running time: 15mins
- Production company: JAM Media

Original release
- Network: TRTÉ; RTÉ TWO; CBBC; ABC Me
- Release: 7 December 2015 – 25 March 2016

Related
- ROY (2009-15); Little Roy (2016-2017)

The ROY Files is an Irish children's television series, filmed in Dublin, Ireland, which was broadcast by TRTÉ and RTÉ TWO in Ireland, CBBC in the United Kingdom and ABC Me in Australia. It began airing on 7 December 2015. The show centres on the title character Roy O'Brien, the 11-year-old animated son of a live-action family. The series is a spin-off from ROY, which ran from 1 July 2009 to 7 April 2015. It stars Jason Cullen (replacing Scott Graham and Robert Donnelly as Roy), Simon Delaney, Cathy Belton and Martha Byrne.

== Plot ==
The show gives an insight into Roy O'Brien's personal life. The episodes consist of O'Brien creating a scrapbook of his life - one which he has to hand in to History teacher and vice-principal, Mr Hammond. It features highlights from all the four series of ROY, as well as new scenes. The series also talks about life living with teachers, coping with bullying and being yourself.
