= BeddyByes =

- Created by: John Rice; Alan Shannon
- Written by: Dave Ingham
- Directed by: Niall Mooney
- Music by: Lucie Treacher
- Countries of origin: Ireland; United Kingdom
- Original language: English
- No. of seasons: 2
- No. of episodes: 52

Production
- Executive producer: Alan Shannon
- Running time: 11 minutes
- Production company: JAM Media

Original release
- Network: CBeebies; RTÉ KIDSjr
- Release: 7 June 2025 – present

BeddyByes is an Irish-British animated children's television series created and produced by JAM Media. The show was made available on the RTÉ Player and the BBC iPlayer in May 2025 and debuted on CBeebies and RTEjr on June 7, 2025. The series was picked up for American distribution and debuted on Disney Jr. (who billed the show as its original programming) on March 2, 2026, and became available on Disney+ in the United States and selected regions the following day.

== Premise ==
BeddyByes follows two plush-like characters MeMo and BaBa as they travel across Planet BeddyByes, meeting new and familiar faces on their journey to bedtime.

== Voice cast ==
- Noah Melo Batista as MeMo
- Phoebe Dalton as BaBa
- Dawn French as Gramma Leeba
- Paul Tylak as The Yummies

== Production ==
The series was in the announced to be in the works in 2022 at that year's Cartoon Forum when JAM Media pitched the series to potential commissioners and partners.

On June 11, 2024, BBC Children's and Education joined as a commissioner for the series.

The series was picked up by Disney Branded Television for US and select international markets on October 1, 2025. The series is created and produced by JAM Media with Blue Ant Media (previously Thunderbird Distribution) handling global sales and licensing for the series.

On September 17, 2026, the BBC and RTÉ commissioned a second season of the series, consisting of 52 more episodes.

== Episodes ==
No.	Title	Written by	US Release date	UK/Ireland Release date	Prod. code
1	"Seeds"	Dave Ingham	March 2, 2026	7 June 2025	101
2	"Hug"	Dave Ingham	March 2, 2026	7 June 2025	102
3	"Lost"	Dave Ingham	March 2, 2026	7 June 2025	103
4	"Jumpy Planet"	Jey McKinley	March 2, 2026	14 June 2025	104
5	"Noise"	Javid Rezai	March 2, 2026	14 June 2025	105
6	"Circles"	Atlanta Green	March 2, 2026	7 June 2025	106
7	"Surprise"	Gillian Corderoy	March 2, 2026	7 June 2025	107
8	"Sticky Leaf"	Matt Baker	March 2, 2026	7 June 2025	108
9	"Floating"	Dave Ingham	March 2, 2026	7 June 2025	109
10	"Flute"	Bec Hill	March 2, 2026	7 June 2025	110
11	"Sorry"	Katie Davies	March 2, 2026	26 July 2025	111
12	"Mystery Song"	Katie Davies	March 2, 2026	26 July 2025	112
13	"Wheels"	Katie Davies	March 2, 2026	26 July 2025	113
14	"Hiccup"	Dave Ingham	March 2, 2026	26 July 2025	114
15	"Wind"	Katie Davies	March 2, 2026	26 July 2025	115
16	"Stars"	Dave Ingham	March 2, 2026	26 July 2025	116
17	"Where's Yummy"	Dave Ingham	March 2, 2026	26 July 2025	117
18	"Red And Yellow Together"	Emma Hogan	March 2, 2026	26 July 2025	118
19	"Gentle"	Gillian Corderoy	March 2, 2026	26 July 2025	119
20	"Looky Tube"	Matt Baker	March 2, 2026	26 July 2025	120
21	"Bigger"	Bec Hill	May 4, 2026	TBA	121
22	"Memo's Bag"	Matt Baker	May 4, 2026	TBA	122
23	"Friend Song"	Emma Hogan	May 5, 2026	TBA	123
24	"Squish Up"	Gillian Corderoy	May 5, 2026	TBA	124
25	"Rainbows"	Atlanta Green	May 6, 2026	TBA	125
26	"Spinning"	Joy O'Neill	May 6, 2026	TBA	126
27	"Dance"	Javid Rezai	May 7, 2026	TBA	127
28	"Tickle"	Nick Ostler & Mark Huckerby	May 7, 2026	TBA	128
29	"MeMo Dog"	Seyi Odusanya	May 8, 2026	TBA	129
30	"Being MeMo"	Jody O'Neill	May 8, 2026	TBA	130
31	"Wait"	Emma Hogan	June 15, 2026	TBA	131
32	"Catch"	Mark Huckerby & Nick Ostler	June 15, 2026	TBA	132
33	"Mud"	Katie Davies	June 16, 2026	TBA	133
34	"I Spy"	Seyi Odusanya	June 16, 2026	TBA	134
35	"Up Down and Upside-Down"	Bec Hill	June 17, 2026	TBA	135
36	"MeMo's Messy Painting"	Niall Mooney	June 17, 2026	TBA	136
37	"Tutu"	Emma Hogan	June 18, 2026	TBA	137
38	"Good to Share"	Gillian Corderoy	June 18, 2026	TBA	138
39	"Den"	Mark Huckerby & Nick Ostler	June 19, 2026	TBA	139
40	"Mirror"	Bec Hill	June 19, 2026	TBA	140
41	"Connections"	Katie Davies	July 6, 2026	TBA	141
42	"Breathe"	Emma Hogan	July 6, 2026	TBA	142
43	"Showtime"	Gillian Corderoy	July 7, 2026	TBA	143
44	"Moth"	Mark Huckerby & Nick Ostler	July 7, 2026	TBA	144
45	"Helping"	Bec Hill	July 8, 2026	TBA	145
46	"Full"	Katie Davies	July 8, 2026	TBA	146
47	"Purple Ducky"	Jody O'Neill	July 9, 2026	TBA	147
48	"Matching Game"	Javid Rezai	July 9, 2026	TBA	148
49	"A Gift from the Heart"	Dave Ingham	July 10, 2026	TBA	149
50	"Flying Friends"	Dave Ingham	July 10, 2026	TBA	150
51	"Baby Tweety"	Gillian Corderoy	July 13, 2026	TBA	151
52	"Happy Happy"	Dave Ingham	July 13, 2026	TBA	152

== Marketing ==
=== Merchandise ===
On January 26, 2026, Thunderbird appointed Moose Toys as its global master toy licensee for the series. Among many of the CP deals signed was a publishing deal with Penguin Random House handling the UK and Ireland (via Ladybird) and North America (via Random House Kids).

== Reception ==
=== Critical response ===
BeddyByes has received critical positive reviews. Fernanda Camargo of Common Sense Media rated the series a four-out-of-five stars, stating, "this show is strategically conceived to help viewers wind down, with simple stories, relaxing music, soft textures, and comforting visuals." Tony Betti of Laughing Place also rated the series a four-out-of-five, stating, "with the goal of promoting healthy routines in mind, BeddyByes succeeds on every level."
