= Susie Power (actress) =

Irish teen actress and singer

- Born: 29 August 2003 (age 22); Dublin, Ireland
- Occupations: Actress, singer
- Years active: 2004–present

Susie Power (born 29 August 2003) is an Irish actress and singer. She is best known for playing Eleanor Daly on Fair City. She is also known for her roles in Dark Touch and Roy O'Brien in Little Roy.

== Acting career ==
=== Early roles ===
Power began her career at nine months old in a theatre production of The Lion King as Simba. She followed this up with additional theatre works The Dream Warp, The Lost Toys and The Naughty Elf.

=== Fair City ===
In 2008, Power made her television debut on Irish soap Fair City. She played the role of Eleanor Daly until 2010.

She made her return as Eleanor Daly from 2015-2021. In late 2015/early 2016, a storyline involving her mother (played by Una Kavanagh) poisoning her drew a lot of controversy.

She is currently back in Fair City in her role as Eleanor from 2025-present.

=== Little Roy ===
Susie was cast in the lead role of Little Roy in 2015. Little Roy is a prequel to the BBC show Roy. The show ran for two seasons and has been broadcast worldwide.

=== World Championship of Performing Arts ===
In July 2015, Susie entered the World Championship of Performing Arts competition. It was held at the Long Beach Performing Arts Center in Long Beach, California. Susie had previously entered in 2014 and made it to the finals.

== Singing career ==
Power has sung on numerous stage shows through her career. In 2010, she performed on the reality show Glas Vegas show which was broadcast on TG4.

She made an appearance in the "SPEAK UP against anti bullying" music video released in October 2016 by composers Ylva and Linda Persson.

=== Junior Eurovision 2016 ===
Power performed in the Junior Eurovision Song Contest 2016 qualifiers which began on 9 October on TG4. Although she was unsuccessful in qualifying for the next round, she later released a single 'Popsicle' on iTunes and Spotify.

== Other media ==
Power served as a presenter for the children's show Hubble from 2010 to 2012.

== Filmography ==
=== Film ===
Year	Title	Role	Notes
2009	My Father The Scientist	Brigit	
2011	The Good	Cliona	
2012	Dark Touch	Lucy Galin	
2012	Hannah Cohen's Holy Communion	Justina	
2013	Beirt Le Cheile	Aoife	
2013	Sophie at the Races	Sophie	
2014	Love Is A Sting	Featured Child Fan	
2014	The Debt	Penny	
2016	A Date for Mad Mary		Rita
2017	Aware	Shauna	
2017	Aware	Shauna	
2017	Ellie	Ellie	
2018	Procession	Little Girl	
2018	Giant Pear	Mitcho	
2018	Luis & The Aliens	Sarah	

=== Television ===
Year	Title	Role	Notes
2008–2010, 2015–2021, 2025-Present	Fair City	Eleanor Daly	
2010–2012	Hubble	Child Presenter	
2012	Little Crackers: Sharon Horgan's Story	Lorraine Horgan	
2016	Junior Eurovision 2016	As Herself	
2016	Little Roy	Roy O'Brien (voice)	
2017	Yo Yo Let's Go	Yoshe	
2018	Becca's Bunch	Sylvia The Fox (voice)	

== Stage ==
Year	Title	Role
2004	The Lion King	Simba
2007	The Dream Warp	Elephant
2008	The Lost Toys	Angel/Elf
2008	The Naughty Elf	Thumbalina
2010	Teenline Variety Show	Solo Performer
2011	Share A Dream 21st Birthday	Solo Performer
2011–2012	Oliver!	Fagan's Gang
2012	Talented Kids 10th Anniversary Show	Various Roles
2012–2013	Oliver	Orphan/Elizabeth
2014	Mini Hamlet	Gertrude
2014	World Championship of Performing Arts	Finalist in Acting
2014	Brigit	Dolly
2015	World Championship of Performing Arts	Finalist in Acting (Won Acting World Championship)
2015	Talented Kids Variety Show	Various Roles
2016	Christmas Stars	Susie performed her single 'Popsicle'
