= London Irish (TV series) =

- Genre: Comedy
- Written by: Lisa McGee
- Directed by: Tom Marshall
- Opening theme: Big Bad Handsome Man by Imelda May
- Country of origin: United Kingdom
- Original language: English
- No. of series: 1
- No. of episodes: 6 (list of episodes)

Production
- Production location: London
- Running time: 23 minutes
- Production company: Company Pictures

Original release
- Network: Channel 4
- Release: 24 September – 29 October 2013

London Irish is a British sitcom that debuted in 2013 on Channel 4. It follows the antics of Conor, Bronagh, Packy and Niamh, four twenty-something Belfast expatriates living in London. It was created by Lisa McGee.

== Main cast ==
- Peter Campion as Patrick "Packy" Kennedy
- Sinéad Keenan as Bronagh Lynch
- Kerr Logan as Conor Lynch
- Kat Reagan as Niamh Rafferty
- Ardal O'Hanlon as Chris "Da" Lynch
- Tracey Lynch as "Ma" Lynch

== International broadcasters ==
In Australia, the series premiered on 12 April 2015 on BBC First.
