= List of Red Rock episodes =

The following is a list of episodes of the Irish television crime drama series Red Rock, first broadcast on TV3 on 7 January 2015 and BBC One in the UK on 11 July 2016. To date, 176 episodes have been broadcast (115 full episodes, 176 counting each episode initially being split into two parts in Ireland, each 30 minutes long including advertisements. In the United Kingdom, each episode was broadcast as a single 45 minute transmission, without advertisements).

Following a major overhaul in the summer of 2016, each episode was a single 60 minute transmission, including advertisements. The series was also moved to a post-watershed timeslot to allow for grittier storylines. A special-double episode, co-written by actor Shaun Williamson, was broadcast on 9 January 2017 as a single 120 minute transmission. The second series was broadcast in the UK between 17 July and 8 September 2017. The first twenty-five episodes of the third series were broadcast from 16 July 2018, with a further ten episodes broadcast from 15 July 2019. The final two episodes were broadcast in Ireland in January 2020, and in the UK the following March.

== Transmissions ==
Series	Episodes	First airdate (IRE)	Last airdate (IRE)	First airdate (UK)	Last airdate (UK)
Series 1	40 (22 + 18)	7 January 2015	31 December 2015	11 July 2016	2 September 2016
Series 2	40 (21 + 19)	6 January 2016	6 March 2017	17 July 2017	8 September 2017
Series 3	37 (14 + 13 + 10)	13 March 2017	8 January 2020	16 July 2018	31 March 2020

== Episodes ==
=== Series 1 (2015) ===
No. in series	Title	Directed by	Written by	Original release date
Part 1
1	"Episode 1"	Peter McKenna	Matt Carter	7 January 2015
1	"Episode 1"	Peter McKenna	Matt Carter	8 January 2015
When Darren Kiely is found badly beaten, CCTV footage implicates Michael Hennessy in the attack. Aware that the rivalry between the two families seems to have died down of late, the Gardaí are wary of breaking the news to Darren's family. Meanwhile, it's Sharon Cleere's first week on the job, and she is paired with Paudge Brennan. On the lookout for further CCTV of Michael Hennessy before the assault, she comes across CCTV which implicates Sergeant Brian McGonigle in a relationship with an underage schoolgirl. Meanwhile, Patricia Hennessy threatens a witness to the assault and warns her there could be repercussions if she chooses to testify.
2	"Episode 2"	Peter McKenna	Matt Carter	14 January 2015
2	"Episode 2"	Peter McKenna	Matt Carter	15 January 2015
The Kielys swear revenge on the Hennessys, leading Bridget Kiely to arrange an attack on the Hennessy's youngest son, David. Meanwhile, Sharon and Angela are forced to break the news to an elderly man that his daughter has died whilst travelling in Morocco. However, when they find him collapsed on his kitchen floor, they discover he has just days to live, so decide against telling him the tragic news. Supt. McKay and his wife are told devastating news that they have suffered a miscarriage in the early stages of pregnancy. Paudge is tricked into thinking he has lost a squad car, while Darren Kiely's wake is interrupted by the arrival of an unwanted guest.
3	"Episode 3"	Kim Revill	Matt Carter	21 January 2015
3	"Episode 3"	Kim Revill	Matt Carter	22 January 2015
Sharon and Paudge arrest a woman with mental issues who tries to force herself on David Hennessy. When they finally discover her identity she leads them to her son's house, where they discover loot from nine unsolved burglaries and shop thefts. But is it an illegal search? Meanwhile, Katie Kiely is unimpressed with her mother's attempts to re-integrate herself within the family, so decides to apply for a job at the newly-opened Neptune Cafe, which she secures - but she soon has bigger problems to worry out when Patricia Hennessy discovers that money is being systematically stolen from the pub, and orders the Garda to arrest her on suspicion of theft.
4	"Episode 4"	Marcus Fleming	Matt Carter	28 January 2015
4	"Episode 4"	Marcus Fleming	Matt Carter	29 January 2015
A man is arrested after attempting to rob a convenience store in order to escape from two goons who are trying to reclaim a debt sold to them by his landlord. However, McKay isn't impressed to discover that Paudge is in fact the landlord, and orders him to buy the debt back. David Hennessy confesses to stealing the money from his mother Patricia, in order to cover up for his brother, Michael. Meanwhile, Sharon bites the bullet and confronts Brian with the CCTV footage of him kissing a schoolgirl, claiming it was handed in by a witness. He denies any relationship and claims it was a friendly kiss, but soon discovers that Sharon was the one who found the footage.
5	"Episode 5"	Anita J. Pandolfo	Lisa Mulcahy	4 February 2015
5	"Episode 5"	Anita J. Pandolfo	Lisa Mulcahy	5 February 2015
Sharon and Paudge attend the scene of a tenancy dispute on the volatile Ridge Estate, but the situation spirals out of control, forcing them to call for backup. Angela tries to defuse the situation but is caught up in an arson attack which leaves her hospitalised on her birthday - forcing some unexpected home-truths. Meanwhile, Bridget decides to leave town and offers to say her goodbyes to Patricia. However, Patricia isn't keen on giving the type of send off she is looking for. Liam berates Patricia over further electricity problems at the cafe, but Patricia is shocked to discover that he has given Katie a job - and orders him to fire her immediately.
6	"Episode 6"	Christian O'Reilly	Lisa Mulcahy	11 February 2015
6	"Episode 6"	Christian O'Reilly	Lisa Mulcahy	12 February 2015
Sean and Adrijan try to help a young mother who has had her car stolen. Sean takes a shine to her, and goes out of his way to recover the stolen vehicle, but Adrijan suspects there is more to the case than meets the eye, and discovers the woman has a long and complicated history with the Garda. Meanwhile, Patricia is furious to discover that David is spending the night with Katie. After grilling Michael about the relationship, he reveals David was present the night that Darren Kiely was murdered, and watched on as the murder took place. When she finally confronts David, she orders that he break off the relationship - or she will ensure he faces a manslaughter charge.
7	"Episode 7"	Eoin McNammee	Ronan Burke	18 February 2015
7	"Episode 7"	Eoin McNammee	Ronan Burke	19 February 2015
Sharon is tasked with taking a group of school students on a tour of the station, but struggles to come up with any inspiring stories. Meanwhile, McGonigle stops a youth he suspects of dealing drugs. Instead of arresting him, he confiscates his gear and gives him a warning. When the boy comes into the station, having been beaten up, he claims McGonigle is responsible. McGonigle denies the beating or taking the gear, but has further problems on the horizon when Sharon witnesses him leaving another rendezvous with Rachel Reid. Meanwhile, Claire continues to push James to restart their IVF cycle, while David continues his relationship with Katie in secret.
8	"Episode 8"	Jan Smith	Ronan Burke	25 February 2015
8	"Episode 8"	Jan Smith	Ronan Burke	26 February 2015
Sean and Adrijan deal with a neighbour dispute involving a noisy dog. Adrijan tries to calm the situation by offering to exercise the dog, but when the dog is later found poisoned, the situation reaches boiling point. Meanwhile, Paudge is in court as a star witness in a battery case, leaving Sharon to be paired with Brian. Having confronted Rachel earlier in the day, warning her to stay away, Sharon is reluctant to go out on the beat, unaware that Brian has organised for her to be on the receiving end of a beating from three armed thugs. Angela's relationship with her husband continues to break down, while Katie is less than pleased with Bridget's latest scheme.
9	"Episode 9"	Anita Pandalfo	Tom Hall	4 March 2015
9	"Episode 9"	Anita Pandalfo	Tom Hall	5 March 2015
Sean and Adrijan lead the search for a young girl who has been reported missing by her father. They discover her disappearance may be linked to the arranged marriage that she was about to be forced into, and immediately lose patience with her father. They suspect that one of her friends, Caitlin, may be protecting her, but struggle to prove it. Meanwhile, Angela continues to alienate her family when she fails to turn up for her son's meeting with his scoutmaster. Sharon prepares to return to work, and tries to build up the courage to rat on Brian. Brian, however, has other plans and warns Sharon that if she decides to speak out, he cannot be held responsible for his actions.
10	"Episode 10"	Anita Pandalfo	Tom Hall	11 March 2015
10	"Episode 10"	Anita Pandalfo	Tom Hall	12 March 2015
Sean and Adrijan arrest a man for aggressive behaviour after a dispute breaks out between the accused and a parking agent who has clamped his car. Meanwhile, Sharon returns to work and warns Brian that she will be keeping a close eye on him. A drunk is arrested after being tied naked to the bandstand on the local pier, but his friends, who are determined to continue the party, turn up at the station and threaten to cause trouble. Sean, Adrijan, Brian and Sharon manage to calm the situation, but when Sean and Adrijan later go to check on their prisoner from earlier, they find him dead in his cell. McKay is forced to call in GSoc to lead up the investigation.
11	"Episode 11"	Ted Gannon	Rob Burke	18 March 2015
11	"Episode 11"	Ted Gannon	Rob Burke	19 March 2015
Sean and Adrijan deal with a local crank who claims that a number of paedophiles are operating close to the local playpark. However, when he is later found beaten, having been the victim of a robbery, the pair begin to suspect that somebody may be wanted him to keep quiet. Sharon books in a lost engagement ring worth £14,000, but is stunned when it later disappears from her desk drawer. She's convinced Brian is responsible, and lo and behold, when he unexpectedly 'finds' the ring, he proclaims himself the hero. Meanwhile, Michael finally confronts Katie over the shock revelation that Darren was blackmailing David over their secret relationship.
12	"Episode 12"	Ursula Rani Sarma	Rob Burke	25 March 2015
12	"Episode 12"	Ursula Rani Sarma	Rob Burke	26 March 2015
Katie finally reveals the shock truth to her family that she has been sleeping with David Hennessy. Vince orders her to move out, but quickly regrets his decision. He persuades Katie to make a statement to the police, confirming that David was being blackmailed by Darren, and that Michael offered to 'sort him out'. Katie also manages to persuade Bridget to give up the money found in Darren's wardrobe as evidence to confirm the blackmail. Sean and Adrijan find a young baby left in the middle of the road, and discover the parents are serial abusers who have previously had two children taken into care. Sharon continues to feel the heat from Brian, but warns she will not be silenced.
13	"Episode 13"	Kim Revill	Lisa Mulcahy	1 April 2015
13	"Episode 13"	Kim Revill	Lisa Mulcahy	2 April 2015
Michael is brought into custody and formally charged with Darren Kiely's murder. Meanwhile, following a further unsuccessful pregnancy test, James decides that he and Claire should take a break from the IVF treatment and focus on their marriage. Sharon's notebook mysteriously disappears, leading to a further confrontation with McGoningle. An urn arrives at the station, having been sent from the USA. The dead man, David O'Reilly, has expressed his wish to be buried at Cowpark. For Angela, however, it sparks some painful memories of a childhood friend who disappeared in 1983. However, she begins to suspect the urn may be a clue as to where the missing girl may be buried.
14	"Episode 14"	Eugene O'Brien	Lisa Mulcahy	8 April 2015
14	"Episode 14"	Eugene O'Brien	Lisa Mulcahy	9 April 2015
Sharon oversteps the mark when dealing with angry shopkeeper whose stock has been damaged by a teenage tearaway. When the shopkeeper makes a complaint against her, she finally reaches breaking point and reveals the whole truth about Brian to McKay. Brian is hauled over the coals, but denies all of the allegations made against him, and instead concocts a story which suggests that Sharon has made the whole story up as he denied her sexual advances. Sharon is convinced Paudge will back up her version of events, but he crumbles in interview at the thought of being branded a grass. Meanwhile, Sean and Adrijan deal with a violent assault involving rival Elvis impersonators.
15	"Episode 15"	Rachel Kilfeather	Imogen Murphy	15 April 2015
15	"Episode 15"	Rachel Kilfeather	Imogen Murphy	16 April 2015
McKay and Angela interview Rachel Reid, but she confirms Brian's version of events. Her father, Liam, isn't convinced and attacks Brian outside of the station. Meanwhile, Bridget's latest harebrained scheme to make money leaves her out of pocket. Vincent confronts dodgy dealer Beady Burke, and he agrees to reimburse her on the understanding that Vincent looks after a gun for him. Angela's son Conor is involved in an accident and is rushed to hospital. He initially admits to have taken marijuana, but later confirms to the nurse that he has also been smoking heroin. As Liam continues to push McKay to investigate Brian, Sharon continues to rebuff his bullying tactics.
16	"Episode 16"	Ted Gannon	Imogen Murphy	22 April 2015
16	"Episode 16"	Ted Gannon	Imogen Murphy	23 April 2015
Sean and Adrijan find an abandoned car covered in blood. They discover the owner, Phil Rodgers, has been badly beaten and hospitalized. He refuses to identify his attacker, but Sean manages to uncover evidence of further offences which secures the suspect's arrest. Meanwhile, Conor's drug addiction continues to spiral, as he continues to fall deeper and deeper into debt. Rachel returns home drunk demanding to see Brian. Liam's suspicions begin to grow, and he demands that McKay open a formal conduct enquiry. However, when Liam later receives a call to say that Rachel hasn't turned up for school, he is troubled to learn that nobody knows where she is.
17	"Episode 17"	Sophie Petzal	Orla Walsh	29 April 2015
17	"Episode 17"	Sophie Petzal	Orla Walsh	30 April 2015
The search for Rachel gets underway, but Sharon is concerned that Brian may be responsible for her disappearance. Brian's daughter Melanie informs Nikki that Rachel was close with a man known as 'Fat Barry', who often hangs around the school and buys the underage students alcohol. Paudge brings Barry in for questioning and discovers that he has a previous conviction for stalking a young girl in Donegal. When Barry leads Paudge and Sharon to a piece of clothing worn by Rachel on the day she disappeared, he is arrested and formally cautioned, but the team soon discover his alibi is rock solid. Meanwhile, Patricia offers a reward of £10,000 for Rachel's safe return.
18	"Episode 18"	Sophie Petzal	Orla Walsh	6 May 2015
18	"Episode 18"	Sophie Petzal	Orla Walsh	7 May 2015
As the search for Rachel intensifies, Liam and Niamh front a television appeal asking for information. Patricia offers Liam some welcome support, but begins to wonder if he really wants to commit to their relationship. Meanwhile, on door-to-door inquiries, Sean and Adrijan come across a young boy, who has been left home alone, who has accidentally started a chip pan fire. His mother returns and pleads with them not to take her son away, and will Adrijan plays good cop, Sean isn't so convinced of the mother's concern. Rachel finally makes contact with Brian, but he warns her they cannot continue their relationship any longer, and tries to convince her to come home.
19	"Episode 19"	Tim Loane	Ronan Burke	13 May 2015
19	"Episode 19"	Tim Loane	Ronan Burke	14 May 2015
A medium turns up at the station claiming to have information on Rachel's whereabouts. When he offers to comfort to Liam and Niamh, McKay is skeptical and asks Sean and Adrijan to look into his past. Meanwhile, Conor stages a burglary at home in order to pay off his drug debt, much to the dismay of Angela, who has no idea the truth behind the attack. Rachel decides to escalate the situation by taking a deadly cocktail of drink and drugs. She phones Brian just as she collapses, but Sharon is witness to the erratic phone call and uses GPS to track Brian to the caravan park. Convinced she has finally caught Brian in the act, she calls for back up and Brian is arrested.
20	"Episode 20"	Lou Ramsden	Ronan Burke	20 May 2015
20	"Episode 20"	Lou Ramsden	Ronan Burke	21 May 2015
As Rachel recovers in hospital, Brian is cautioned and questioned at another station. Paudge tries to convince Sean to apologise to Sharon, but his pleas fall on deaf ears. Liam tries to persuade Rachel to make a statement against Brian, but Rachel refuses to implicate him in any wrongdoing, until she has a heart to heart with Sharon, which shocks her into changing her mind. Brian tries to plead his innocence with McKay, but McKay is disgusted and lashes out. Meanwhile, a particularly difficult prisoner who likes cavity searches has been brought into the station. McKay asks Sean to search him, but he refuses, which gives Paudge and Adrijan a good idea for a little scam.
21	"Episode 21"	Marcus Fleming	Rob Burke	27 May 2015
21	"Episode 21"	Marcus Fleming	Rob Burke	28 May 2015
Paudge and Sharon are on the trail of a young jewellery thief who decides to swallow his goods in order to avoid being caught with them. Meanwhile, Paudge's money troubles continue to escalate, leading to the point where his car is repossessed just as he is about to sell it. Sean and Adrijan continue to fight for Nikki's affections by gathering leads on a burglary ring involving their old friend Blu-Ray, but Adrijan is gutted when he sees Sean and Nikki kissing. When Conor's laptop is recovered in a haul of stolen goods found in Blu-Ray's flat, Angela is delighted - but Conor begins to panic. Katie is determined to go ahead with an abortion, against her family's wishes.
22	"Episode 22"	Peter McKenna	Rob Burke	3 June 2015
22	"Episode 22"	Peter McKenna	Rob Burke	4 June 2015
Paudge continues to suppress his money troubles, but when an angry builder who has been renovating one of his rental properties turns up at the station demanding to see him, he is forced to ask for help. Paudge tries to buy him off by repaying a sum towards the debt, but the builder is unimpressed and decides to strip the house of the material he had previously fitted. When local tearaway Ollie Coyne then trashes the house as an act of revenge, Paudge decides to do the unthinkable. Sean and Adrjian's friendship breaks down as their feud over Nikki's affections reaches boiling point, but their tensions result in a tragic outcome. Katie continues her fight to have an abortion.
Part 2
23	"Episode 23"	Kim Revill	Niall Fallon	2 September 2015
23	"Episode 23"	Kim Revill	Niall Fallon	3 September 2015
Two months on, and the search for the hit-and-run driver who injured Adrijan is in full flow. Sean and Nikki close in on a suspect after identifying a CCTV image of the car involved in the attack. Meanwhile, Paudge's demons come back to haunt him when Ollie Coyne turns up at the station and confronts him with the video footage of him burning down his own house. He confiscates Ollie's phone, but when the footage finds its way into Beady Burke's possession, Paudge realises he is in deep trouble. Angela decides to skip a visit to see Conor in rehab to go out celebrating with the team, and ultimately confirms to Tommy that she can no longer bear to look at her own son.
24	"Episode 24"	Ursula Rani Sarma	Niall Fallon	9 September 2015
24	"Episode 24"	Ursula Rani Sarma	Niall Fallon	10 September 2015
A raid on a drugs den on the Ridge estate finds Paudge caught between a rock and a hard place, when Beady demands that he play informant and tip him off before the raid goes down. Paudge fails to do so, but allows Beady to escape. Beady, however, is unhappy that many of the key players in his distribution outfit have been arrested, and large quantities of his drugs have been seized. Meanwhile, Sean and Sharon arrest a vulnerable pensioner who attacks a burglar he finds in his kitchen. When the victim is later discovered to be the man's carer, Sean realises he may have been too harsh. Katie goes for her first scan, but is told some worrying news about her baby's heart.
25	"Episode 25"	Rachel Kilfeather	Lisa Mulcahy	16 September 2015
25	"Episode 25"	Rachel Kilfeather	Lisa Mulcahy	17 September 2015
Sharon investigates a case of domestic abuse, but is unimpressed when the victim, Eva Tully, refuses to press charges against her violent boyfriend, Josh Greene. When Sharon discovers that Greene has broken the terms of his visa, she uses the situation in an attempt to protect Eva. Meanwhile, Angela continues to struggle to trust Conor upon his return home from rehab. Her concerns are heightened when he fails to return home from college that evening, but her worry turns to pride when she discovers he has attended an AA meeting. When Vincent struggles to raise the money to buy a pram for Katie's baby, Keith's hair-brained scheme to rob one leads to Vincent getting a job.
26	"Episode 26"	John Yorke & Peter McKenna	Lisa Mulcahy	23 September 2015
26	"Episode 26"	John Yorke & Peter McKenna	Lisa Mulcahy	24 September 2015
Sharon and Paudge attend to an assault victim in the local hospital, only to discover it is none other than Ollie Coyne, who has been assaulted by Beady's thugs for pocketing drugs he was meant to sell. Paudge convinces Ollie to testify against Beady, but soon receives a visit from the unhappy thug, who threatens to harm his mother unless he continues to keep their arrangement. Meanwhile, a young boy brings a live hand grenade he found on the bus into the station, forcing an evacuation. Vincent starts his new job at the security firm, but struggles to keep his nerve. Sean and Adrijan's arrest of Joan Curry, who is found drunk at the wheel, leads to an unexpected romance.
27	"Episode 27"	Jan Smith	Trevor Laffey	30 September 2015
27	"Episode 27"	Jan Smith	Trevor Laffey	1 October 2015
Angela deals with a man who complains that his son's grave is being constantly vandalized, but unhappy with the Garda's response, the man takes matters into his own hands, and confronts those responsible. Meanwhile, Vincent's job is compromised when a cargo of leather jackets is stolen from the warehouse by none other than Bridget and Keith. Paudge is forced to feed Beady information on the whereabouts of police checkpoints in the area, in order for him to ferry an illegal drugs shipment across town. Michael finds solace in new arrival Siobhan Reilly, who turns up at a charity due organised by Patricia, but their evening turns sour when he is forced to reveal that he killed Darren Kiely.
28	"Episode 28"	Amy Conroy	Trevor Laffey	7 October 2015
28	"Episode 28"	Amy Conroy	Trevor Laffey	8 October 2015
Sharon and Angela deal with a persistent shoplifter who is caught stealing from a local grocery store. The Kielys hear news of Michael's attempt to enter a plea bargain and plead guilty to manslaughter - and the situation is further inflamed when Patricia tries to offer them £150,000 to support it. Keith does not react well to the news, and decides to pay Patricia's business a visit. Meanwhile, Beady offers Paudge information on a rival dealer to eliminate his competition. Sean discovers the identity of Adrian's lover. Siobhan turns up, offering to give Michael another chance, and Angela and Tommy's marriage is put to the ultimate test when Tommy's girlfriend Kiera turns up at the station.
29	"Episode 29"	Tim Loane	Ruth Meehan	14 October 2015
29	"Episode 29"	Tim Loane	Ruth Meehan	15 October 2015
McKay witnesses a stabbing on his way to the 5-a-side match against the Ridge boys, and is forced to miss out on the action. Meanwhile, the match descends into anarchy and both Sean and Keith Kiely end up with bloody faces. The Garda later discover that the Ridge boys have stolen all of their personal possessions during the frenzy - forcing Sean and Keith to bury the hatchet in order for the team to get them back. In hospital, McKay and Nikki interview victim Davey Webb, which leads to the shocking revelation that he was assumed to be the rat who grassed up Laser Byrne, when it was in fact none other than Beady. Conor is accused of theft, forcing Tommy to give Liam some home truths.
30	"Episode 30"	Tom Needham	Ruth Meehan	21 October 2015
30	"Episode 30"	Tom Needham	Ruth Meehan	22 October 2015
Paudge decides to turn the tables on Beady, insisting that he give him money in return for protection. Paudge is surprised, however, when Beady turns up at a pub that he and Nikki are about to raid, despite prior warning - but soon realises Beady isn't as stupid as he first thought. Sean and Adrijan arrest a man for indecent exposure, but discover he may have been under the influence of a hypnotist at the time. Sean's pursuit of Niamh finally gets off the ground following a stupid bet with Adrijan, but when Niamh finds out, she plots her revenge. Angela and Nikki fight for promotion to inspector, while one of the Kiely's neighbours turns up at the station claiming to be a victim of harassment.
31	"Episode 31"	John Yorke	Rob Burke	28 October 2015
31	"Episode 31"	John Yorke	Rob Burke	29 October 2015
Halloween proves to be an eventful day in Dublin as Sharon and Angela are forced to deal with a callout on the volatile St. Columba's housing estate to help a woman who was fallen and broken her ankle. When they discover the woman is heavily pregnant, the urgency of the situation boils over when the stress of the situation sends the victim into early labour. Meanwhile, Beady's niece Aoife is arrested for dealing drugs on the Ridge. When questioned, she denies all knowledge of Beady's operation, but Nikki is furious when the drugs confiscated from Aoife mysteriously disappear. Unaware that Paudge has stolen them at Beady's request, an unsuspecting Adrijan becomes prime suspect.
32	"Episode 32"	Beverly Woods	Rob Burke	4 November 2015
32	"Episode 32"	Beverly Woods	Rob Burke	5 November 2015
The pressure mounts on Adrijan as he refuses to open up to McKay and provide him with an alibi. He unceremoniously asks Joan Curry for help, but after claiming that their affair could lead to him losing his job, Joan is furious and wants nothing more to do with him. Meanwhile, Davey Webb is arrested following a petrol station robbery. CCTV places Davey at the scene, and a jacket worn by one of the suspects is found in his room. His mother is furious, and claims that he was at home with her, unfazed by the seemingly undeniable evidence that Nikki holds on him. McKay, meanwhile, decides to play the situation and offers Davey the chance to become his informant.
33	"Episode 33"	Eleanor Greer	Ronan Burke	11 November 2015
33	"Episode 33"	Eleanor Greer	Ronan Burke	12 November 2015
McKay and Nikki become convinced that Paudge is the mole, leaking information to Beady. McKay demands that Paudge reveal the identity of the informant who gave him the information that lead to Laser Byrne's arrest. Paudge concocts a story involving Ollie Coyne, and convinces Beady to make Ollie back up his version of events. Adrijan tries to patch things up with Joan Curry, but she rebuffs the idea of a rekindlement. Beady's thugs are hauled into the station, in the hope that one of them will crack under pressure and grass on their boss. McKay finally reaches boiling point and confronts Beady in a locked cell. Meanwhile, Michael discovers Siobhan is heading back to Thailand.
34	"Episode 34"	Eleanor Greer	Ronan Burke	18 November 2015
34	"Episode 34"	Eleanor Greer	Ronan Burke	19 November 2015
Paudge is first to be interviewed when McKay calls in the DCC to uncover the identity of the mole. Meanwhile, new detective Rory Walsh turns up for his first day on duty, and is shocked to encounter a pregnant Katie Kiely, after their fling some months ago in a nightclub. Meanwhile, Michael continues to press ahead with his plan to leave Dublin and travel to Thailand with Siobhan. Patricia uncovers his plan and tries to stop him from leaving, but Michael has already had second thoughts on the idea. The DCC fail to uncover any information which could suggest who the mole might be, much to Paudge's delight. However, McKay is still convinced that he is somehow connected to Beady's operation.
35	"Episode 35"	Hamish Wright	Niall Fallon	25 November 2015
35	"Episode 35"	Hamish Wright	Niall Fallon	26 November 2015
Conor's road to recovery faces a setback when one of his former school friends, Daniel Dooley, is killed after attempting to rob a taxi driver for money to buy heroin. After being tempted into danger by Rachel, will Conor choose to forfeit his months of hard work? McKay's request to have Davey as his informant is turned down by the big bosses, forcing him to take a risk and employ him as an unregistered informant. Rory's pursuit of the taxi driver who was involved in Dooley's death hits a brick wall when he appears to go to ground after Paudge discovers he has overstayed his visa. But when Paudge later catches up with him, he makes the shocking decision to drop the matter.
36	"Episode 36"	Tim Loane	Niall Fallon	2 December 2015
36	"Episode 36"	Tim Loane	Niall Fallon	3 December 2015
McKay organises an operation to catch Laser Byrne in the process of moving a stash of counterfeit booze and cigarettes, but when the sting fails to go to plan, he is forced to think of a second approach. A call from social services leads Sean and Adrijan back into the path of a young mother they encountered some months previously, who has now tried to kidnap her son from the foster parents who are looking after him. Meanwhile, Angela decides to cheer herself up by organising a night out with Tommy, but her evening takes an interesting turn when Sean and Adrijan turn up, much to Tommy's dismay. Laser realises Davey has been squealing to McKay, and teaches him a harsh lesson.
37	"Episode 37"	Christopher Brandon	Coilin O Scolai	9 December 2015
37	"Episode 37"	Christopher Brandon	Coilin O Scolai	10 December 2015
With Davey in witness protection, his mother and sister become targets for Laser, and when his house is petrol bombed, his younger sibling is left fighting for her life. McKay realises he has made an awful mistake, and attempts to protect Davey by allowing him refuge in his flat, much to Claire's dismay. Meanwhile, Angela and Nikki are forced to break the news to the Kielys that the DPP have accepted Michael's plea for manslaughter. Vincent is furious, but Angela manages to persuade him to encompass his thoughts in a victim impact statement to be read out in court. He has other problems to worry about, however, when Katie brings Rory home for a nightcap, and Keith recognises him.
38	"Episode 38"	Ursula Rani Sarma	Coilin O Scolai	16 December 2015
38	"Episode 38"	Ursula Rani Sarma	Coilin O Scolai	17 December 2015
The day of Michael's sentencing finally arrives, and tensions are running high. Patricia is furious when she discovers that the judge overseeing the case is tied up with another hearing, and that the new judge assigned to their case is known for passing heavy sentences. The Kielys' victim impact statement fails to have tenure, however, when the judge passes a sentence of five years - four of which are suspended, meaning that Michael will only serve a year in jail. Following the verdict, Vincent decides to dish out his own brand of justice, and confronts Michael with a broken bottle. Meanwhile, McKay continues to search for Davey, who has failed to turn up at the safe house in Galway.
39	"Episode 39"	Peter McKenna	Lisa Mulcahy	23 December 2015
39	"Episode 39"	Peter McKenna	Lisa Mulcahy	24 December 2015
Christmas cheer is all around as the station's secret Santa gets underway, but Paudge isn't feeling so cheerful. Beady is back on his case, and continues to demand information on grass Jamie Donnelly's whereabouts. When Paudge tries to warn Donnelly's girlfriend of the impending danger, Beady responds by abducting Paudge's mother. Paudge is forced to call on his fellow colleagues for help, forcing the suspicion that he was the mole giving information to Beady. Meanwhile, at the end of his tether, Vincent asks Keith to procure a gun for him, and he decides to execute the kind of justice he was hoping for. But when Katie goes into premature labour, Vincent is forced to re-think his plan.
40	"Episode 40"	Kim Revill	Lisa Mulcahy	30 December 2015
40	"Episode 40"	Kim Revill	Lisa Mulcahy	31 December 2015
David isn't pleased with Katie's choice of surname for Baby Luke, and becomes further infuriated when Rory intervenes and warns him to cool his temper. Meanwhile, as the Hennessys prepare for Michael to begin his sentence, McKay abandons their last supper to confront Paudge, who confirms that he is the mole who has been working for Beady. Maggie pleads with him to save his career, but Paudge becomes determined to do right by his colleagues. As McKay takes him in to the station for a formal interview, he is confronted by a masked attacker, who stabs him with a carving knife, and then goes on to attack Paudge, leaving the pair for dead on the station forecourt.

=== Series 2 (2016–2017) ===
No. in series	Title	Directed by	Written by	Original release date
Part 1
1 (41)	"Episode 1"	Tom Needham	Lisa Mulcahy	6 January 2016
1 (41)	"Episode 1"	Tom Needham	Lisa Mulcahy	7 January 2016
As the team try to come to terms with McKay's death, the hunt for his killer begins. DI Lonergan, an out-of-town investigator, is sent to the station to take lead on the case. Although suspicion initially swings towards Beady, a subdued Paudge continues to protest his silence on the matter, convincing Rory that his version of events doesn't quite ring true. Meanwhile, the Kielys mark the anniversary of Darren's death by laying a wreath, and Claire comes face to face with Davey, unaware of the danger that he actually poses.
2 (42)	"Episode 2"	Rachel Kilfeather	Lisa Mulcahy	13 January 2016
2 (42)	"Episode 2"	Rachel Kilfeather	Lisa Mulcahy	14 January 2016
As Davey becomes the prime suspect for McKay's murder, CCTV evidence is discovered which shows him trashing McKay's grave. Counter-surveillance spot Davey on a local estate, and Sean and Adrijan give chase. The team are delighted when Davey is brought into custody, but Paudge doesn't seem so pleased. Sharon soon comes to realise that Paudge is clearly hiding something from her, and later, he drunkenly reveals his involvement with Beady. Meanwhile, the Kielys invite the Hennessys over to see baby Luke.
3 (43)	"Episode 3"	Emer Kenny	Coilin O Scolai	20 January 2016
3 (43)	"Episode 3"	Emer Kenny	Coilin O Scolai	21 January 2016
Sharon finds a phone in Paudge's locker which seemingly confirms his identity as the station mole. Meanwhile, Rachel and Conor's relationship continues to intensify, until he slips away from her mid-date to meet a heroin dealer. However, his latest effort to reach a chemical high is shattered when he falls unconscious, and Rachel is forced to call an ambulance. Paudge decides to tell Nikki about his indiscretions, but seemingly finds himself in the clear when Beady is found shot through the head on nearby wasteground.
4 (44)	"Episode 4"	Kim Revill	Coilin O Scolai	27 January 2016
4 (44)	"Episode 4"	Kim Revill	Coilin O Scolai	28 January 2016
Angela is devastated to discover the extent of Conor's addiction. After being released from hospital, Tommy vows to keep a close eye on Conor while Angela returns to work. But when Stephen is involved an incident at school, Tommy decides to leave Conor home alone. Meanwhile, Rory arrests a Polish prostitute for soliciting, but finds himself on the end of an official complaint. Angela and Nikki both find themselves up for promotion, but realising that her family must come first, Angela graciously allows Nikki to accept the job.
5 (45)	"Episode 5"	Fiona Peek	Bruce Webb	3 February 2016
5 (45)	"Episode 5"	Fiona Peek	Bruce Webb	4 February 2016
Brian's return to Red Rock sends shock waves through the team after he is arrested by Sharon and Paudge after becoming involved in an altercation with his estranged wife and daughter. Sean and Adrijan find themselves at loggerheads after Adrijan assaults a suspect involved in the mugging of a pensioner, and Sean is forced to lie to Nikki to protect him. Tommy finds it increasingly hard to keep Conor in check. Brian continues his dogged pursuit of Rachel, unaware that a suspicious Sharon is watching his every move.
6 (46)	"Episode 6"	Trevor J. Colgan	Bruce Webb	10 February 2016
6 (46)	"Episode 6"	Trevor J. Colgan	Bruce Webb	11 February 2016
Conor's addiction to heroin continues to spiral out of control, forcing Tommy to physically restrain him. Angela faces up to the prospect of having to leave Red Rock before the situation intensifies, unaware that Conor's actions have already forced Rachel to seek solace in none other than Brian. Sean and Adrijan's friendship continues to struggle in the light of the assault on Jack O'Reilly, and Sean makes it abundantly clear that has no intention of keeping Adrijan's state of mind a secret from his colleagues.
7 (47)	"Episode 7"	Tim Loane	Niall Fallon	17 February 2016
7 (47)	"Episode 7"	Tim Loane	Niall Fallon	18 February 2016
Dismayed by the lack of intervention from the Gardaí, Liam takes matters into his own hands by persuading Sharon to provide him with Brian's address. David is angered when he discovers that the Kielys have been planning a christening for baby Luke without his involvement. GSOC prepare to interview Sean and Adrijan over the O'Reilly incident, but Adrijan isn't prepared to talk and instead decides to drown his sorrows. Bridget's former lover, Joe Fallon, makes an unexpected reappearance, much to the dislike of Vinnie.
8 (48)	"Episode 8"	Ursula Rani Sarma	Niall Fallon	24 February 2016
8 (48)	"Episode 8"	Ursula Rani Sarma	Niall Fallon	25 February 2016
Brian tries to convince Rachel to retract her statement against him. Sean manages to persuade O'Reilly to drop the charges against Adrijan, unaware that O'Reilly has organised a little honey trap to exact revenge of his own. Called out to a burglary on the Ridge, Sean finds himself trapped in a flat with three armed masked men. Bridget resorts to taking out a loan with Joe Fallon to save face. When Rachel finally agrees not to testify against him, Brian uses the opportunity to worm his way back into his wife's good books.
9 (49)	"Episode 9"	Stephanie Lloyd Jones	Charlie McCarthy	2 March 2016
9 (49)	"Episode 9"	Stephanie Lloyd Jones	Charlie McCarthy	3 March 2016
Liam's distrust of Rachel continues to grow, and after failing to find any evidence of contact with Brian, he decides to follow her as she heads to a deserted park on the outskirts of town. Adrijan informs Nikki that he saw O'Reilly at the scene of Sean's assault, but Sean informs him that his eagerness to pursue justice could only make the situation worse. Bridget resorts to gambling in an attempt to pay back her debts. David and Patricia argue over her insistence of getting baby Luke's surname changed to Hennessy.
10 (50)	"Episode 10"	Kim Revill	Charlie McCarthy	9 March 2016
10 (50)	"Episode 10"	Kim Revill	Charlie McCarthy	10 March 2016
Baby Luke's christening fails to go off without a hitch when Joe Fallon gatecrashes the party, and Vincent is forced to admit that he came to an agreement with Patricia overpaying half towards the ceremony. Rachel has disappeared, and a furious Liam suspects that she may be hiding out with Brian. David and Katie share an intimate moment alone, and a hint of rekindled romance occurs between the former lovers. Sean continues to pressure Adrijan to tell Nikki about his condition. Brian has a heart-to-heart with Jules.
11 (51)	"Episode 11"	Tom Needham	Ciarán Tanham	16 March 2016
11 (51)	"Episode 11"	Tom Needham	Ciarán Tanham	17 March 2016
Rachel is furious when she discovers that Brian has been meeting up with Jules. Bridget asks Vincent for help in paying back her debt to Joe Fallon, and he agrees to set up a job to gather the cash. Sharon and Paudge are later called to the scene of an off-license robbery, where the cashier identifies Vincent as the perpetrator: but further investigation by Sharon and Rory disproves the cashier's version of events. After winning back his job at The Neptune, Conor tries to persuade Rachel to tell the truth about Brian.
12 (52)	"Episode 12"	Gemma Doorly	Ciarán Tanham	23 March 2016
12 (52)	"Episode 12"	Gemma Doorly	Ciarán Tanham	24 March 2016
Brian stages a burglary at his bedsit, and after breaking into her house, leaves a trail of evidence which seemingly identifies Sharon as the perpetrator. With Nikki determined to play things by the book, Sharon finds it difficult to convince her that Brian has staged the entire event. Meanwhile, Bridget accepts a job working for Joe Fallon as a way of repaying her debts, unaware that Fallon is under the watchful eye of the Gardaí for an assault in which one of his clients was beaten to within an inch of his life.
13 (53)	"Episode 13"	Michael Jenner	Conor Morrissey	30 March 2016
13 (53)	"Episode 13"	Michael Jenner	Conor Morrissey	31 March 2016
Angela is distraught when Brian tries to blackmail her into perjuring herself on the witness stand. With GSOC taking over the investigation into the burglary at Brian's flat, Sharon is suspended from duty, much to the upset of Paudge, who decides to take matters into his own hands. Bridget pulls a sickie from work to try to avoid Joe, but he isn't prepared to let the matter lie easily. Rachel decides to resort to drastic measures and pays a visit to Jules, claiming that all of the accusations she made against Brian were false.
14 (54)	"Episode 14"	Kim Revill	Conor Morrissey	6 April 2016
14 (54)	"Episode 14"	Kim Revill	Conor Morrissey	7 April 2016
Conor confronts Rachel in a desperate bid to save his mum's career, but Rachel isn't prepared to give up easily. As Brian and Jules grow ever closer, he is delighted to hear that she will accompany him to court on the day of his trial. In an attempt to save Sharon further heartache, Paudge befriends a well known criminal, Mick Moran, who has a grudge against Brian for sending his brother to prison. Liam believes that he has sealed Brian's fate when catches Rachel packing a suitcase and becomes convinced she is running away.
15 (55)	"Episode 15"	Terry McMahon	Darach Mac Con Iomaire	13 April 2016
15 (55)	"Episode 15"	Terry McMahon	Darach Mac Con Iomaire	14 April 2016
On the day of Brian's trial, Nikki is given potentially damning new evidence, forcing her to make the decision to apply to get the trial postponed. However, when Brian fails to show at court, Nikki is forced to issue a warrant for his arrest. Having been one of the last people to see Brian before he disappeared, Conor is hauled in for interview, but struggles to account for his whereabouts after leaving Jules' house. Rachel finally comes to her senses, but struggles to convince Nikki that she knows nothing about Brian's disappearance.
16 (56)	"Episode 16"	Ken Bourke	Darach Mac Con Iomaire	20 April 2016
16 (56)	"Episode 16"	Ken Bourke	Darach Mac Con Iomaire	21 April 2016
As the search for Brian intensifies, evidence comes to light which vindicates Sharon for the burglary at his bedsit. But when his daughter Mel mysteriously disappears, Nikki becomes convinced that she may be the key to locating her absent father. Adrijan is devastated after receiving the results of his medical report, and abandons his post to drown his sorrows. Tommy agrees to buy Conor his next fix, but is left fighting for his life after walking into a honey trap set by two scheming dealers. Liam's distrust of Rachel grows.
17 (57)	"Episode 17"	Tim Loane	Diarmuid Goggins	27 April 2016
17 (57)	"Episode 17"	Tim Loane	Diarmuid Goggins	28 April 2016
Nikki informs the team that Brian has been found dead on the outskirts of Red Rock. Regional Superintendent Kevin Dunne is drafted in to oversee the investigation, much to Nikki's dismay. Having to be seen to be playing by the rules, Nikki is forced to take Sharon off the investigation. Meanwhile, Adrijan is confronted by knife-wielding member of the public who has a complaint about his noisy neighbours, forcing Sean to step in and save him. Rory and Paudge both begin to grow suspicions of Sharon's strange behaviour.
18 (58)	"Episode 18"	Emer Kenny	Diarmuid Goggins	4 May 2016
18 (58)	"Episode 18"	Emer Kenny	Diarmuid Goggins	5 May 2016
Paudge suspects that Sharon has wiped CCTV footage from the night of the murder, and sets about confronting her. Rory organises a search of Jules' house and finds evidence of burnt clothing. Superintendent Dunne orders the team to show a united front by attending Brian's funeral. Despite being banned from proceedings, Rachel makes an unexpected appearance, much to the anger and disgust of Brian's daughter, Mel. Sean tries to patch things up with Adrijan on his last day of service before he returns home to Croatia.
19 (59)	"Episode 19"	Tom Needham	Ronan Burke	11 May 2016
19 (59)	"Episode 19"	Tom Needham	Ronan Burke	12 May 2016
Nikki questions the validity of Rachel's alibi on the night of Brian's disappearance. Rory is delighted when blood traces found at The Pipes are confirmed to belong to Brian, but Nikki berates him for passing her over in an attempt to score points with Superintendent Dunne. CCTV footage suggests that Liam hasn't been entirely truthful about his whereabouts on the night of the murder, but the team are surprised to discover that the only person who can corroborate his story is Sean. Joe oversteps the mark with Bridget.
20 (60)	"Episode 20"	Paul Walker	Rob Burke	18 May 2016
20 (60)	"Episode 20"	Paul Walker	Rob Burke	19 May 2016
Bridget prepares to exact her revenge on Joe by feeding details of his involvement in Ger McIntyre's death to the Gardaí. Conor's secret is finally uncovered when during an operation to track down Mick Moran, Nikki and Paudge spot him scoring drugs. Superintendent Dunne leaks information to the press suggesting that Liam is the prime suspect for Brian's murder. Angela is hauled over the coals by Nikki after she reveals that she withheld information regarding Conor's whereabouts on the night of Brian's murder.
21 (61)	"Episode 21"	Fiona Peek	Rob Burke	25 May 2016
21 (61)	"Episode 21"	Fiona Peek	Rob Burke	26 May 2016
The net closes in on Brian's killer as Sean and Rory find the suspected murder weapon, a missing wheel brace. When Mick Moran is finally traced, he claims that he saw Sharon in the vicinity of Brian's bedsit shortly before he disappeared. Tommy struggles to account for his whereabouts. Dunne reassures Angela that he intends not to let the situation ruin her career. The Kielys receive an unexpected visit from a former client of Joe Fallon, which gives Bridget an interesting idea. DNA evidence seemingly identifies Brian's killer.
Part 2
22 (62)	"Episode 22"	Kim Revill	Ronan Burke	12 September 2016
A flashback to the night of the murder reveals that after telling Rachel that he intended to leave without her, Brian was killed by a single blow to the head with a lead pipe. Although involved an earlier altercation outside Brian's house, Conor is revealed not to have played any role in his death, but due to his fingerprints being on the wheel brace which he confronted Brian with — which Nikki and Rory believe to be the murder weapon — Conor is arrested. Can Angela and Tommy prove their son is not capable of murder?
23 (63)	"Episode 23"	Michael Jenner	Lisa Mulcahy	19 September 2016
Conor is interrogated by Nikki and Rory, but denies all involvement. Rory, however, manages to pick up on Conor's insistence that he has never been to the location of Brian's murder - despite a social media photograph suggesting otherwise. Coupled with the incomplete timeline of his movements and the overwhelming forensic evidence, Nikki makes the decision to charge him with murder. Rachel, mortified that Conor could face life in prison for her crimes, goes against her father's advice and vows to tell the truth to Nikki.
24 (64)	"Episode 24"	John Yorke	Lisa Mulcahy	26 September 2016
Liam manages to persuade Rachel not to reveal the truth about what happened on the night of Brian's murder. Meanwhile, there are celebrations afoot when Michael is released early on licence from prison, but David is sidelined as his feelings for Katie continue to grow. Michael is pleased when old flame Siobhan makes an unexpected return to Red Rock, but does she harbour an ulterior motive? Sharon and Paudge are called out to a report of a dealer selling alcohol to youths, but are confronted with allegations of Gardaí corruption.
25 (65)	"Episode 25"	John Yorke	Coilin O Scolai	3 October 2016
Niamh encourages Katie to tell David how she really feels, but seemingly unable to get over Michael's return, Katie decides to call time on the relationship. Reeling from finally being dumped, David finds comfort with Siobhan. Sharon and Paudge suspect that Tina may be stringing them along when she fails to identify the alleged corrupt Gardaí and provides an erroneous description which fails to identify the perpetrator. Keith tries to rob a security guard emptying a supermarket cash machine, but his plan goes horribly wrong.
26 (66)	"Episode 26"	Hugh Travers	Coilin O Scolai	10 October 2016
Michael's increasing frustration at his level of involvement in Harbour Haulage leads Patricia to finally reveal the truth: that she has no intention of handing over the business until she retires. A tense legal meeting ends with Conor choosing to fire Claire as his legal representative. Sharon and Paudge's pursuit of a supposedly corrupt Gardaí leads them to a dry cleaners. David and Katie arrange a meeting at the Pier to announce they are finally moving in together, but Siobhan's unexpected return puts a spanner in the works.
27 (67)	"Episode 27"	Ben Cooper	Trevor Laffey	17 October 2016
A new sergeant, Johno O'Riordan, arrives at the station and immediately warms the hearts of the team by pulling a prank on Paudge. Meanwhile, the fallout from Michael's allegations against David sends shockwaves through both the Kiely and the Hennessy households. Patricia pleads with Michael to lie to the Gardaí and stick to his original story, but tired of his brother constantly being favoured, Michael is torn and nearly cracks under interrogation from Nikki. As the pressure intensifies, Claire goes into early labour.
28 (68)	"Episode 28"	Terry McMahon	Trevor Laffey	24 October 2016
As the tension in the Hennessy household intensifies, Patricia is caught in the crossfire, forcing her to make a heartbreaking decision. Beady's niece Aoife resurfaces with claims that her mother, Donna, has disappeared - but Paudge is dismissive, having heard similar claims from the youngster many times before. Claire tries to persuade Katie to give David another chance. Having been backed into a corner, an angered Michael decides to stage a burglary at Harbour Haulage in an attempt to win back the support of his family.
29 (69)	"Episode 29"	Ken Bourke	Conor Morrissey	31 October 2016
Johno receives word that the alleged burglary at Harbour Haulage was an inside job, and having instigated the attack himself, Michael is forced to look for a scapegoat. Although he later backs out of the idea, Robbie goes ahead and frames driver Damo Wilson by planting stolen goods in his car, forcing Michael to uphold the story. Nikki disobeys orders and transfers manpower away from a planned protest against a local councillor to follow a lead on Donna Burke's whereabouts. David is furious to find Niamh babysitting Luke.
30 (70)	"Episode 30"	Kim Revill	Conor Morrissey	7 November 2016
Baby Luke is taken to hospital after falling from his high chair, but in an attempt to save face, Bridget lies to David and claims that his son was suffering from a previously undetected heart defect. Suspecting that there is more to the situation than meets the eye, Claire probes a doctor for information. Michael's illegal cigarette scam backfires when it transpires that Robbie is working alongside Laser Byrne. Nikki steps up the investigation into Donna Burke's disappearance, much to the dismay of Superintendent Dunne.
31 (71)	"Episode 31"	Michael Jenner	Ronan Burke	9 January 2017
Katie learns of David's plan to apply for full custody of Luke. Keith finds himself in a spot of bother when he tries to recover a debt from a particularly tricky customer and finds his heart ruling his head. Patricia plucks up the courage to go dating, but is horrified when her dining partner steals her bag. The Gardaí receive word of an illegal cigarette scam operating on their patch. David results to desperate measures in an attempt to prove Katie is an unfit mother, but his actions unwillingly put baby Luke in grave danger.
32 (72)	"Episode 32"	Shaun Williamson	Ronan Burke	9 January 2017
Rachel and Conor's relationship begins to intensify, until the troubled youngster faces up to the reality of a spell in prison. Johno continues his investigation into the date night thief, and uses Angela as bait for an undercover sting. Keith's temper boils over when Alice continues to taunt him, forcing him to commit an act of violence which shocks the Kiely family to the core. Conor is surprised when he discovers that Rachel has a second phone. Tension in the Hennessy household continues to build between David and Michael.
33 (73)	"Episode 33"	Mark Keane	David Roden	16 January 2017
Suspicious of the content of Rachel's second phone, Conor resorts to drastic measures. Convinced that the phone contains evidence linking the Reids' to Brian's murder, Angela begs Nikki to organise a search of their house. David tries to persuade Alice to make a statement against Keith, but his plan backfires when Alice informs Bridget that David masterminded the attack which threatened baby Luke's life. Cracking under the pressure of interview, Rachel makes a shocking accusation which threatens to incriminate Conor.
34 (74)	"Episode 34"	Gemma Doorly	David Roden	23 January 2017
Angela continues her pursuit of the Reid's, rifling through their rubbish in an attempt to find the 'missing' second phone. As Liam is forced to make an official complaint, Nikki receives word from Superintendent Dunne that management has made the decision to suspend Angela from duty until the conclusion of Conor's trial. Sparks begin to fly as unlikely romance blossoms between Johno and Patricia. Katie issues Bridget with an ultimatum: to cease her money-lending activities or face losing her daughter and grandson.
35 (75)	"Episode 35"	Liberty Martin	Rob Burke	30 January 2017
Conor discovers that Angela has been suspended, forcing him to confront Rachel. When the situation gets out of hand, Sean is forced to intervene but is caught between his loyalty to the skip and his relationship with Niamh. As Sharon continues to probe the local haulage firms for information on the counterfeit cigarettes, Patricia discovers that Robbie has a criminal record: and against Michael's wishes, decides to give him the sack. When Rory discovers Conor's deceit, he decides he has no option but to charge him with assault.
36 (76)	"Episode 36"	Tom Needham	Rob Burke	6 February 2017
Angela is surprised when Conor rebuffs her prison visit, unaware that he is secretly in fear of being threatened for being the son of a Gardaí. Rory announces that a Detective's Aid position has been offered by management, and pits Sharon and Sean against one another for the position. Michael tries to pressure his mother into giving Robbie his job back. When Katie catches wind of Bridget's ongoing money lending outfit, she decides to pack her bags and leave Red Rock forever: forcing a distraught David to take drastic action.
37 (77)	"Episode 37"	Marcus Fleming	Coilin O Scolai	13 February 2017
As the search for David and Baby Luke gets underway, Luke's beloved teddy, along with David's car, are found abandoned at the pier, forcing Katie to fear the worst. A curious Rachel goes to visit Conor in prison, while Sean continues to show animosity towards Angela. Sharon's first day as the Detective's Aid proves fruitful when she uncovers a lead on a suspected cocaine supplier. Michael finds himself under increasing pressure from Robbie following Laser's threat and struggles to keep his nerve when David begs him for help.
38 (78)	"Episode 38"	Hugh Travers	Coilin O Scolai	20 February 2017
As the search for David and Luke continues, Johno tries to provide a listening ear. Angela decides to go against Conor's wishes and arranges to visit him in prison. Michael proposes to pay Laser £80,000 as a way of buying his way out of their deal but is angered when he discovers Patricia has locked him out of the company accounts. David's attempts to make amends backfire when Katie decides to go ahead with her plan to leave Red Rock. Conor comes close to relapsing, and a deal with a fellow inmate turns sour.
39 (79)	"Episode 39"	Kim Revill	Bruce Webb	27 February 2017
Angela and Tommy hold a bedside vigil for Conor. As the guilt of Conor's stabbing threatens to send him over the edge, Liam makes the shocking decision to claim responsibility for Brian's murder. The Kielys struggle to adapt to life without Katie. Patricia agrees to lend Michael the money he owes, but Laser isn't prepared to let Michael off the hook easily, and during a tense showdown at Harbour Haulage, he threatens Patricia with a gun. Patricia is furious, but the confrontation gives Michael another way of getting out of the deal.
40 (80)	"Episode 40"	Kim Revill	Bruce Webb	6 March 2017
Liam offers a full confession to Nikki, despite Rachel's insistence that she was responsible for Brian's death. Michael prepares to settle his debt with Laser, unaware that Robbie has secretly switched alliances. Nikki is horrified to discover that she is to be demoted and transferred back to Donegal in light of recent events. When Michael tries to double-cross Laser, he finds himself in grave danger: and although he manages to escape Laser's clutches, Laser has one last trick up his sleeve, which involves a little help from Keith.

=== Series 3 (2017—2020) ===
No. in series	Title	Directed by	Written by	Original release date
Part 1
1 (81)	"Episode 1"	Gemma Doorly	Diarmuid Goggins	13 March 2017
In the aftermath of the Harbour Haulage fire, Patricia is devastated to learn that David has suffered from severe smoke inhilation and is currently unable to breathe on his own. As the net closes in on Michael, Laser seeks retribution and warns Patricia that he has no qualms about killing every single member of the Hennessy family to secure their silence. With Nikki having been transferred to Donegal, Superintendent Kevin Dunne takes overall charge of the station, while Rory pushes to be appointed as Nikki's successor.
2 (82)	"Episode 2"	Kim Revill	Diarmuid Goggins	20 March 2017
Sean's suspicions that Keith was involved in the Harbour Haulage fire continue to grow, forcing Vinnie to fake an alibi in the form of a prostitute who claims that she was with Keith at the time of the blaze. Johno uncovers evidence that suggests the fire may have been the result of an insurance fraud scam gone wrong. Sharon pushes Rory to bring in one of Laser's dealers who has been caught selling his own gear. When phone records identify a potential location for Laser's operation, Sharon decides to investigate.
3 (83)	"Episode 3"	Johnny Candon	Conor Morrissey	27 March 2017
Sharon tries to persuade Robbie to give evidence that will help bring down Laser's operation. But realising that the net is slowly closing in, Rory tries all he can to prevent him from talking. Sean struggles to cope with new partner Ash, unaware that she has a secret connection amongst the station bigwigs. Claire is shocked when Patricia is forced to reveal the truth about the night of the fire. Angela arranges for Robbie to be transferred to Duneden, but en route, Rory and Sharon are ambushed and Robbie is kidnapped.
4 (84)	"Episode 4"	Kim Revill	Conor Morrissey	3 April 2017
With Sharon recovering in hospital, Rory's behaviour continues to spiral out of control. Laser arrives at the station claiming to have an alibi for the time of the kidnapping. After forcing David to lie to the Garda about Michael's involvement in the fire, Patricia finds herself at loggerheads with Claire, who decides that it is time for a change of scenery. Niamh continues to struggle in the aftermath of her father's imprisonment and turns to Rory for comfort. A late night rendezvous between Rory and Laser ends in tragedy.
5 (85)	"Episode 5"	Kim Revill	Bruce Webb	10 April 2017
Despite orders to the contrary, Sharon returns to work and immediately begins to push for further resources to find Robbie. Rory is forced to lie to his grandad, Jim, about a bullet missing from the magazine of his gun. Johno tries to extract information on Claire's whereabouts from Patricia. Former HR clerk Linda McNulty is promoted to Detective's Clerk and immediately begins to push her overbearing personality on the team. Rory's behaviour continues to spiral as Laser forces him to dispose of Robbie's corpse.
6 (86)	"Episode 6"	Antoin Beag O'Colla	Bruce Webb	17 April 2017
The net begins to close in on Laser as undercover Gardaí manage to install covert surveillance cameras in his Dublin hideout, but it's not long before Rory is trying all he can to warn him that he is being watched. Ash and Paudge are called to deal with trespassers in a derelict building, only to find a frightened Aoife Burke sleeping rough. Bridget arrives back from Spain to discover that one of her recently widowed clients, Carmel Donovan, hasn't been keeping up with her debt repayments. Sharon begins to grow closer to Rory.
7 (87)	"Episode 7"	Paul Walker	Ciaran Tanham	24 April 2017
After being confronted by a gang of thugs, Jim decides to regain his confidence. As the team prepare to strike Laser's hideout, he makes it known that he is being watched. Paudge and Ash visit Carmel Donovan in hospital after she suffers a stroke, but despite reports from her neighbours of a confrontation taking place prior to her being taken ill, she denies any third party involvement. Rory strikes a deal with Laser to keep him out of custody. Sharon trails Laser to the location of a suspected drug deal, but is spotted.
8 (88)	"Episode 8"	Paul Quaid	Ciaran Tanham	1 May 2017
Rory uses a golden opportunity to finally get Laser off his back, but Sharon soon comes to realise that Laser's dying words could yield a clue as to Robbie's whereabouts. Despite being caught in the crossfire, Keith contemplates sticking around to steal the remainder of Laser's drugs haul. David continues to push Patricia to admit to Johno that Michael wasn't responsible for the fire at Harbour Haulage. As Rory and Sharon continue to grow closer, Paudge struggles to disguise his true feelings and lashes out.
9 (89)	"Episode 9"	Kim Revill	Trevor Laffey	8 May 2017
Jim drops the bombshell that the gun Rory recovered from Laser's jeep isn't his. Ash manages to persuade Carmel to identify Bridget as the loanshark who stole her wedding rings. Angela's promotion begins to cause problems at home. The team identify the warehouse where was Robbie was held as one of Laser's hideouts, and Paudge and Ash are sent on a search mission. When they arrive to find Rory already cleaning up, suspicions are aroused, but it isn't long before Ash finds exactly what Rory is looking for.
10 (90)	"Episode 10"	Mark Keane	Trevor Laffey	15 May 2017
Keith attends Laser's wake, unaware that his uncle Eugene believes him to be the rat who sold Laser out to the Gardaí. Sharon's suspicions of Rory's involvement in Robbie's disappearance continue to grow, as she digs deeper into the Brosnan Road post office robbery, visiting a journalist who claimed that a member of the Garda Síochána was acting as Laser's inside man. Determined to prevent Jim from becoming implicated in the investigation, Rory tampers with evidence by wiping the gun found at the warehouse.
11 (91)	"Episode 11"	Johnny Candon & Paul Walker	Bruce Webb	22 May 2017
In light of the allegations made by Sharon, Rory is forced to take leave while an internal investigation is launched. Keith struggles to escape from Eugene's shadow, and Vinnie is appalled when Bridget makes the suggestion of selling the stolen drugs right under his nose. Patricia's money troubles continue, and Johno finds he is unable to provide much comfort. Rory is distraught to discover that Jim has handed himself in to the Gardaí, claiming to be Laser's inside man and taking the wrap for Robbie's disappearance.
12 (92)	"Episode 12"	Gemma Doorly	Bruce Webb	29 May 2017
Rory struggles to forgive Sharon for arresting Jim. Jim instructs the team to search an area of woodland for Robbie's body, but they come across more than they bargained for when the foot of a second victim is discovered. Keith decides to setup business on his own, but runs into a familiar face after being asked to supply drugs for an illegal gambling ring. At the Superintendent's ball, Patricia meets a charming young politician, while Johno and Paudge begin to suspect that Ash's relationship with Dunne is more than platonic.
13 (93)	"Episode 13"	Kim Revill & Paul Walker	Diarmuid Goggins	30 May 2017
Robbie's post mortem throws up a number of unanswered questions, leading Sharon to believe that Jim may not be responsible for his murder. As further body parts are recovered from the woods, the team are horrified to discover that the victim is none other than Donna Burke. Ash is given the devastating task of delivering the news to Aoife. Linda's attraction to Paudge finally yields results after a drunken night in the pub. Rory is left heartbroken when Jim dies in hospital after being attacked by thugs in prison.
14 (94)	"Episode 14"	Kim Revill	Diarmuid Goggins	31 May 2017
When forensic testing reveals that the gun found in Laser's warehouse bears no fingerprints, Sharon realises that her first assumptions about Rory were true. Determined to finally bring Rory to justice, Sharon confronts him with the evidence, but in an effort to save his own skin, Rory threatens to bring down Paudge by offering information about his relationship with Beady. Realising there is no way from saving Paudge from Rory's clutches, Sharon makes the heartbreaking decision to leave Red Rock - and the Gardaí.
Part 2
15 (95)	"Episode 15"	Cian McGarrigle & Paul Walker	Ronan Burke	22 January 2018
Tony Doyle is arrested and questioned about the night of Donna's disappearance. Paudge offers to help Aoife after social services refuse to take her out of Tony's care. Dunne lands Ash in hot water after removing a familiar ring found amongst the evidence relating to Donna's disappearance. Johno finds a sample of cocaine in Patricia's handbag, left by Tom during the drugs' awareness ball. Keith panics when Alice threatens to tell Mick about the assault unless he gives her 50% of all profits from his cocaine haul.
16 (96)	"Episode 16"	Liberty Martin & Paul Walker	Ronan Burke	29 January 2018
Paudge begins to suspect that Aoife may have been sexually abused, but his impromptu arrest of Tony Doyle leads to a few choice words from Angela. Kevin confides in Tom after his guilt over removing the Willowbrook ring from the evidence haul begins to overwhelm him, but is blown away by the revelation that Tom slept with Donna on the night she died. Johno is delighted when an unexpected breakthrough in the drugs investigation leads him to identify a potential suspect, while Keith naively attempts to fob Alice off.
17 (97)	"Episode 17"	Demian Fox & Kim Revill	Rob Burke	5 February 2018
Kevin's continued interrogation of Tom leads to an unexpected confession. Paudge and Ash interview a witness, Tanya Brady, who claims that she has information that could potentially identify Donna's killer. Conor pushes Angela into allowing him to take part in a round-the-world trip with friends from college. With help from Sean, Johno organises a sting to catch the cocaine dealer in action, but is devastated when the suspect - who turns out to be none other than Keith Kiely - manages to give him the runaround.
18 (98)	"Episode 18"	Demian Fox & Hugh Travers	Rob Burke	12 February 2018
Information gathered from Donna's phone leads the team to believe that she died at the Abbey Road motel. A search of the motel leads Rory to meet an old acquaintance, Irena Bajorek, who now works as a cleaner. After initially being sidelined by Angela, Ash helps to search the motel and discovers hidden cameras disguised as carbon monoxide alarms. Vincent orders Keith to move out, forcing him to rethink his business plans, but he is left stunned when a confrontation with Alice is interrupted by the arrival of her son.
19 (99)	"Episode 19"	Paul Walker	Conor Morrissey	19 February 2018
Motel manager Graham Carville is hauled in for questioning, but refuses to give any information without being offered immunity from prosecution, until underhand tactics from Rory turn the tables in the team's favour. When hard drives containing video footage from the motel are recovered, the team are delighted to discover the murder has been caught on tape - until they discover the footage gives them no further clues on the killer's identity. Sean is left heartbroken when Niamh admits that she slept with someone else.
20 (100)	"Episode 20"	Fiona Peek	Conor Morrissey	26 February 2018
Paudge continues his pursuit of Tony, gathering witness statements that suggest that he was violent towards Donna on a regular basis. Tom continues to ramp up the pressure on Kevin, and when a bag containing masking tape and bleach is discovered close to the crime scene, Kevin lashes out, suspecting that he may have been framed for murder. Keith recruits Alice as his second-in-command, unaware that Mick has suspicions of their illegal activity. Sean is the subject of station gossip after word of his breakup spreads.
21 (101)	"Episode 21"	Gemma Doorly	Hannah Quinn	5 March 2018
Paudge is forced to break the news of Tony's arrest to Aoife, but is unexpectedly roped into helping the grieving youngster dispose of her mother's ashes. Aoife later decides to make a statement, confirming that she was a victim of sexual abuse and that Tony was the perpetrator. Keith attempts to build bridges with Alice, but an unexpected visit from Mick leads him straight into the clutches of a furious Eugene. Sean tries to extract further information from Irena. Niamh confides in Ash in light of her break up with Sean.
22 (102)	"Episode 22"	Sean Smith	Hannah Quinn	12 March 2018
Vinnie and Bridget begin a frantic search for Keith, but to little avail. Bridget decides to use Alice to extract information from Mick. Aoife provides a statement to Paudge which confirms that she was sexually abused by Tony, but unwittingly, the grieving youngster gives her abuser an alibi for the night of her mother's murder. After learning that Keith may have been locked in the boot of a car driven into the docks, Vinnie and Bridget look on anxiously as Johno and Sean organise a dive team to comb the riverbed.
23 (103)	"Episode 23"	Kim Revill	Trevor Laffey	26 March 2018
Bridget's plan for Keith to lie low is scuppered by a visit from Eugene, who demands to know the whereabouts of the remaining cocaine haul. Aoife returns for a second interview, during which Dunne tries his hardest to break down Tony's alibi. Patricia begins to grow tired of Johno's constant interfering and orders him to stay away. Tom calls upon the services of an old friend to help Patricia out of a sticky situation. When Keith discovers Bridget has sent Eugene to Alice's door, he breaks cover to try and rescue her.
24 (104)	"Episode 24"	Johnny Candon	Trevor Laffey	2 April 2018
Keith enlists Vinnie's help to dispose of Eugene's body, unaware that he hasn't yet taken his last breath. After realising their grave mistake, Keith and Vinnie take Eugene home and tie him up in the kitchen, forcing Bridget to distract the unwanted attentions of a benefits officer who comes calling. Paudge and Johno interview Mick, who claims to know nothing about Keith's disappearance. A distracted Keith allows Eugene to escape from captivity, but a short chase leads Eugene right into the path of a removal lorry.
25 (105)	"Episode 25"	Paul Quaid & Kim Revill	Laura Way	9 April 2018
Keith tries to avoid unwanted attention as Eugene fights for his life in hospital. Convinced that he knows more than he is letting on, Johno and Rory interrogate Keith, and watch on unwittingly as the key piece of evidence tieing Keith to the case is taken away by a hospital porter. Dunne berates Linda after she pressures the DPP for an update on the charging of Tony Doyle. Patricia gives in to temptation and takes her relationship with Tom to the next step. Keith is further unsettled when Eugene succumbs to his injuries.
26 (106)	"Episode 26"	Frank Rickarby	Laura Way	16 April 2018
Keith finds himself unable to settle as the aftermath of Eugene's death unfolds. Ash discovers that the Willowbrook ring is missing from the evidence store, but Dunne tries his hardest to prevent her from informing Angela of the development. Johno tries to persuade Vinnie to turn informant to protect Keith. Patricia is concerned when Seamus orders payment for services rendered much earlier than expected. Vinnie warns Alice to stay away from Keith. Eugene's niece, Jackie, orders Little Barry to keep watch on the Kielys.
27 (107)	"Episode 27"	Paul Walker	Diarmuid Goggins	23 April 2018
A night out on the tiles leaves Sean sleeping off the hangover from hell in the cells. Rory and Johno interrogate Keith and Vinnie when Eugene's post mortem report reveals that he sustained a number of injuries that cannot possibly be linked with being hit by the van. Little Barry approaches Keith with a proposition to courier drugs from France, but Vinnie warns him to stay well clear. Sean witnesses Irena (who is revealed to be Georgian, and therefore without entitlement to live in Ireland) being assaulted by her pimp, Marek, and decides to investigate further, and a PNC search leads him to a former convent on the outskirts of town, where he is knocked unconscious by Marek, who steals his police card.
Part 3
28 (108)	"Episode 28"	Fiona Peek & Kim Revill	Diarmuid Goggins	4 February 2019
Sean awakens following his beating at the hands of Marek and is forced to admit to Johno that his badge has been stolen. Paudge and Johno, with their suspicions of Keith heightened by the autopsy report showing pre-mortem injuries on Eugene's body, find a witness who claims to have phone footage of the chase which lead to Eugene's demise, but Paudge inadvertently drops it into a bucket of water. Keith prevents Alice from getting back with Mick and then offers her the spare room back home. Bridget uses Alice's need of money for a home in her custody dispute to manoeuvre Keith towards accepting Barry's offer.
29 (109)	"Episode 29"	Kim Revill	Rob Burke	11 February 2019
Seamus confronts Tom after Duneden Station launch an investigation into his fraudulent activities. Rory is assigned to assist with the case, but when Johno catches sight of a file containing information on Patricia's apartments, he breaks rank by warning her that Seamus has come under the spotlight. Kevin warns Tom that if he is investigated in regard to this, then his DNA, linking him to the murder of Donna, may be taken, and suggests that he leave Patricia to take the blame. Paudge warns Sean that he is getting in too deep with Irena, who is now staying in his home while hiding from Marek. Although the alleged footage of Eugene's last moments cannot be recovered, other forensic clues, through his shoes, are discovered. When Keith refuses to take the French job and thus help Alice get a home, she arranges to do it herself. Keith then decides to go with her, and they are met by Jackie.
30 (110)	"Episode 30"	Ciaran Heyden	Rob Burke	18 February 2019
Eugene's shoes have indicated that he was involved in the attempted killing of Keith, increasing Johno's determination to find him. Jackie had been told by Eugene about Keith's attempt to kill him, shortly before she caused his death in hospital. She intimidates Alice and Keith into carrying the drugs for €10,000 rather than the €50,000 they had been led to expect. Keith takes on the risk of carrying the bag through customs and is arrested on leaving the dock, through information Johno got by withholding Barry's medication from him. The bag, however, turns out to contain nothing but clothes, with Keith assuming he had inadvertently swapped the bag on the boat. Tom assures Patricia that she need have no concerns about the police interview, and then made a voluntary statement to Rory, denying that he knows Seamus and claiming that Patricia had asked him for a loan for building work. Patricia, in an interview with Rory, admitted only to paying Seamus a fee commensurate with surveying work and absolved Tom from any involvement in the deal. Sean helps Irena, with whom he is becoming increasingly friendly, to prepare her application for a job at the pub, but she becomes nervous and leaves during the interview.
31 (111)	"Episode 31"	Paul Walker & Kim Revill	Ronan Burke	25 February 2019
Linda's boyfriend Clive, a forensic accountant, uncovers a large transaction between Patricia and Seamus, and Angela questions her over this. Patricia confronts Tom in front of his wife, and his tendency to use prostitutes is revealed. The owner of the swapped suitcase tries to bribe Keith and Bridget, but Bridget intimidates him into returning it. Johno has an illegal clone made of Barry's phone to intercept his text messages, and his information causes the meeting with the drug buyer to fail. Jackie charges Keith with selling the drugs, declaring him to be €90,000 in debt to her. Vinnie is opposed to the idea, but Bridget encourages him and Alice to take on the task, but the drugs are soon found to have unexpected effects, sending Rachel Reid into a fit.
32 (112)	"Episode 32"	Paul Walker	Ronan Burke	11 March 2019
Rachel is on a life support machine in hospital, but lack of knowledge of what she has taken limits the doctors until Ash finds residue of the tablet in the tread of her shoe, and she regains consciousness when appropriately medicated. Johno identifies Keith's and Alice's voices on a recording of the 999 call made from the club. Patricia, aware that Irena is short of money and of her history of prostitution, hires her to obtain pictures with which to blackmail Tom. Irena later rebuffs approaches from Sean.
33 (113)	"Episode 33"	Paul Walker	Conor Morrissey	18 March 2019
Ash decides to move from Kevin's to take a room with the Reids. As Tony Doyle pleads not guilty, it becomes clear that Ash will have to testify about the documented evidence in the murder of Donna Burke, including the ring. Patricia tells an unsympathetic David of the situation she is in, and lets Tom know of the photographs she has. Keith is under mounting pressure: Jackie requires repayment, he has qualms about selling the contaminated drugs, the drugs have gone from where he had them hidden, Rachel has identified Alice as the one who sold her the drugs, he has threatened Rachel and been assaulted by Johno. Keith and Alice decide to leave the area, but as they prepare to abduct Finn from his school, they are arrested by police following information from Bridget, who had had a row with Keith. Alice realises she has incriminating drugs in her pocket, which Keith takes from her and consumes, and then has a bad reaction to them in the cell.
34 (114)	"Episode 34"	Kim Revill	Conor Morrissey	25 March 2019
Ash discovers Kevin's Willowbrook ring, and recognises it as the same as that which went missing from the evidence log. She prepares a list of members of the rugby team, and approaches Tom to take a DNA sample, which he refuses. Patricia tells Tom to admit to setting up the deal with Seamus or she will make the pictures of Tom and Irena public; he makes a public statement admitting that he has seen prostitutes, thus removing her threat over him. With Keith in hospital, Vinnie discovers that it was Bridget who told the police of his whereabouts, and he sends her away from the hospital in a furious row. Angela receives a hospital report that Keith has recent injuries, and confronts Johno over the cause of them, which he attributes to his fit. A team from Garda headquarters, including Sharon, arrives to question Rory about Laser Byrne's and Robbie Scanlon's deaths. Rory threatens to denounce Paudge over his links with Beady, but Sharon assures both Rory and Paudge that there is no evidence of that.
35 (115)	"Episode 35"	Kim Revill	Diarmuid Goggins	1 April 2019
Detective Superintendent Vic Cullen is brought in to oversee the detective's unit in the light of Rory's arrest, and the whole station staff is liable to interview over his activities. Ash tells Angela about the missing ring, and that she had told Kevin about it sometime earlier. Angela confronts Kevin about it, saying it would undermine the case against Doyle. DNA samples are taken from members of the team, and Tom admits in an interview that he was a regular client of Donna, but that he asked Kevin to intervene when she threatened to expose him. Vik and Angela tell Kevin that he will be interviewed over Donna's death, and when he explains the story to his wife, Sarah, she is furious that he charged a man she knows to be innocent. Kevin leaves a suicide message for Sarah, and Tom unexpectedly comes to the rooftop. Realising that he does not have the courage and that Tom lacks the courage to kill him, Kevin resolves to tell the truth of the situation, and as police cars arrive, having tracked Kevin's phone, Tom throws himself to his death.
36 (116)	"Episode 36"	Gordon McCaughley, Niall Queenan, & Paul Walker	Diarmuid Goggins	6 January 2020
Kevin is brought in for questioning regarding Tom's death, with Angela leading the case, but with the evidence of his telephone message deleted by Sarah, he makes a false statement that Tom had gone to the rooftop before him, intending to kill himself. Forensics reports present no evidence of anything but suicide. He is, however, detained in the cells overnight when Angela finds evidence folders relating to the death of Donna Burke in a search of his home. Sean is tasked with investigating Irena's involvement in the blackmailing of Callaghan, but he talks with her about their relationship instead. Kevin pleads with Ash to find out who helped Tom to remove and bury Donna's body, and she discovers that Tadhg McNamee, who left his job as Tom's driver the day after the murder, is in hiding in Cavan. She and Paudge travel there to interview him, but are taken by him at gunpoint while searching his cabin.
37 (117)	"Episode 37"	Gordon McCaughley, Niall Queenan, & Paul Walker	Diarmuid Goggins	8 January 2020
McNamee agrees to go to the station to be interviewed but has a reliable alibi having been in hospital on the night of Donna's death. Tony Doyle leads the police to evidence of him meeting with Lois Callaghan, and she is arrested shortly after the funeral and questioned about planting evidence against Doyle. Little Barry threatens Keith, who is still in a coma, and gives Vince an ultimatum about paying the money back to Jackie. Vince offers Johno the information he has on the drugs ring, and he and Bridget bring the remaining pills to the police station. Irena is arrested while trying to get a passport and gives evidence against Patricia who persuades Johno to give her time to make her arrangements before making a confession. She tries to flee the country but is arrested by Johno. They walk into the station, followed by Vince and Bridget. As Keith, being visited by Alice, emerges from his coma, a massive bomb that had been put into Vince's car is remotely detonated by Jackie. Huge damage is done to the station, and Paudge is shown walking around in a daze, seeing several key protagonists severely injured or apparently dead, and only Sean appears uninjured, as Paudge is revealed to have a severe abdominal wound.
