= Becca's Bunch =

Television series

- Created by: Chris Decker; Connor Finnegan
- Directed by: Connor Finnegan
- Countries of origin: Ireland; United Kingdom
- Original language: English
- No. of episodes: 26

Production
- Executive producers: John Rice; Alan Shannon
- Producer: Mark Cumberton
- Production company: JAM Media

Original release
- Network: Nick Jr. (UK and Ireland); CBC Kids (Canada); KiKA (Germany)
- Release: 2 July 2018 – 10 May 2019

Becca's Bunch is a preschool television series produced by JAM Media in association with Nickelodeon UK, the Canadian Broadcasting Corporation, WDR and NDR Norddeutscher Rundfunk that premiered in the United Kingdom and Ireland on Nick Jr. on 2 July 2018 and ended on 13 December 2018. The series later premiered in the United States on the Nick Jr. Channel on 24 September 2018.

== Characters ==
=== Main ===
- Becca (voiced by Noa Fe Williams) is an optimistic bird who wears a red knit cap. She is the leader of her bunch and the protagonist of the series. Her musical instrument is a guitar.
- Russell (voiced by Dylan Martin Frankel) is an adventurous squirrel. His musical instrument are the drums.
- Pedro (voiced by Ben Stone Zelman) is a fearful bespectacled worm. His musical instrument is a tambourine.
- Sylvia (voiced by Susie Power) is a clever pink fox. She carries a shoulder bag containing objects which her friends would sometimes use in their adventures. Her musical instrument is a keyboard.

=== Recurring ===
- Benny and Shelly (both voiced by Lisa Biggs) are Becca's baby brother and sister. They are still in their eggs, though their limbs are sticking out, and are able to walk.
- Moms (voiced by Amy Stephenson) is Becca's mother. She is sometimes seen flying an aeroplane.
- Pops (voiced by Grant George) is Becca's father.
- Uncle Ned (voiced by William Gaminara) is Pedro's uncle.
- Ringo (voiced by Guy Harris) is a turtle who is a bus driver.
- Mayor Ladymaus (voiced by Amy Palant) a opossum is the mayor of Wagtail Woods.
- Barry (voiced by Daxx George) is a little bunny.
- Lola (voiced by Lisa Biggs) a rabbit who is Barry's mother.
- Casper and Jasper (both voiced by Jaden Pace) are the hare brothers, and are somewhat rivals of the bunch.
- Beatrice (voiced by Sabrina Glow) is a young badger, who is a friend of Casper and Jasper.
- Gill (voiced by Jason Shablik) is a big fish.
- Steven Se'Gull (voiced by Paul Tylak) is a seagull, he's the lifeguard of the beach.
- John Wolfenstein (voiced by Paul Tylak) is a grey wolf, who is a radio personality of Wagtail Woods.
- Mr. Nugget (voiced by Paul Tylak) is a chicken, who's John Wolfenstein's best friend and colleague. Unlike the other characters, he does not speak but just clucks.
- MJ (voiced by Joey Camen) is a big moose.
- Buck (voiced by Joey Camen) is a building beaver.

== Production and broadcast ==
The series is a production of JAM Media. In June 2018, it was announced that Becca's Bunch would premiere in the United Kingdom and Ireland on Nick Jr. on 2 July 2018. On 19 September 2018, it was announced that the series will premiere in the United States on the Nick Jr. Channel on 24 September 2018. The series was also sold for broadcast on ABC Kids in Australia, KiKa in Germany, CBC Kids in Canada and France Télévisions. Becca's Bunch consists of 52 eleven-minute segments.

== Episodes ==
No.	Title	Original release date	U.S. air date	Prod. code	UK viewers (millions)	U.S. viewers (millions)
1	"Legendary Gill" / "Benny & Shelly's Big Day Out"	2 July 2018	4 October 2018	109	N/A	TBA
2	"Beddy, Set, Go" / "Mayor for a Day"	3 July 2018	24 September 2018	101	N/A	TBA
3	"Rockin' the Wood" / "Mail Mayhem"	4 July 2018	25 September 2018	102	N/A	TBA
4	"Party, Party" / "Tree Talk"	5 July 2018	26 September 2018	103	N/A	TBA
5	"Junior Lifeguard" / "Tent Trouble"	6 July 2018	27 September 2018	104	N/A	TBA
6	"Acorn King" / "Woodness Book of Wagtail Woods"	7 July 2018	28 September 2018	105	N/A	TBA
7	"Wagtastic Four" / "Rock-A-Bye Bunnies"	10 July 2018	1 October 2018	106	N/A	TBA
8	"Wow Me Wagtail" / "Wishing Stone"	11 July 2018	2 October 2018	107	N/A	TBA
9	"Cute Lil' Bug" / "Eye of the Beholder"	12 July 2018	3 October 2018	108	N/A	TBA
10	"Happy Pal'n'Times Day" / "Their Song"	13 July 2018	2 February 2019	110	N/A	TBA
11	"Robobuck" / "Helper Badge"	20 August 2018	5 October 2018	111	N/A	TBA
12	"Mom's Day" / "Fogtail Woods"	21 August 2018	May 10, 2019	112	N/A	TBA
13	"Happy Pinecone Day" / "Stick With Me"	22 August 2018	8 October 2018	113	N/A	TBA
14	"Lost and Found" / "Take a Kid to Work Day"	23 August 2018	9 October 2018	114	N/A	TBA
15	"Right as Rain" / "Stargazing"	24 August 2018	10 October 2018	115	N/A	TBA
16	"The Great Indoors" / "Follow That Float"	10 October 2018	11 October 2018	116	N/A	TBA
17	"Halloween Spooktacular" / "Pumpkin"	11 October 2018	12 October 2018	117	N/A	TBA
18	"Woodland Games" / "Unidentified Fun Object"	11 November 2018	11 February 2019	118	N/A	TBA
19	"Coconuts" / "Wagtail Review"	13 November 2018	12 February 2019	119	N/A	TBA
20	"What's In Store" / "Bird Bunch"	15 November 2018	13 February 2019	120	N/A	TBA
21	"Becca's Big Decision" / "Steven's Surprise"	18 November 2018	May 6, 2019	121	N/A	TBA
22	"Up In The Air" / "Super Sour Power"	22 November 2018	May 7, 2019	122	N/A	TBA
23	"Snowball Rumble" / "Merry Woodsmas"	12 December 2018	12 December 2018 (126A) 13 December 2018 (126B)	126	N/A	TBA
24	"Runaway Acorns" / "Sylvia Sleuths"	13 December 2018	10 December 2018 (124A) 11 December 2018 (124B)	124	N/A	TBA
25	"Wagtail Critter" / "Gill Out of Water"	TBA	8 May 2019	123	TBD	TBA
26	"High Flyer" / "Saturday Night Cheeper"	TBA	9 May 2019	125	TBD	TBA

== Awards and nominations ==
Year	Award	Category	Nominee	Result
2019	Kidscreen Awards	Best New Series	Becca's Bunch	Nominated
2019	Kidscreen Awards	Best Non-Animated or Mixed Series	Becca's Bunch	Nominated
