= Hunger Again =

2005 radio play by Dermot Bolger

Hunger Again is a radio-play written by Dermot Bolger. It was first performed on BBC Radio 4 in 2005. The play is set in contemporary Republic of Ireland and deals with the after effects of large-scale radioactive contamination.

== Plot synopsis ==
The play revolves around mother Helen Curtayne and her daughter Millie. The father is terminally ill with cancer.

One night the television news broadcasts reports that there has been an accident in a nuclear power station in the United Kingdom. (The station is not named but it is likely a reference to Sellafield.) The rain contaminates most of Ireland leaving only parts of Munster unharmed. Helen and her daughter fight against civil unrest to get to safety.

== Performance ==
The play was first performed at 9:00 P.M. on 21 March 2005 on BBC Radio 4 in the United Kingdom.

The cast included Cathy Belton, Owen Roe, and Hannah R. Gordon.
