= Little Roy (TV series) =

Animated television series by Rob Burke and Ronan Burke

- Logo With Characters
- Genre: Mockumentary
- Directed by: Rob Burke; Ronan Burke
- Starring: Susie Power; Maclean Burke; Niamh McCann; Robyn Dempsey
- Composer: Darren Hendley
- Countries of origin: Ireland; United Kingdom
- Original language: English
- No. of series: 2
- No. of episodes: 52

Production
- Executive producers: Mary Gallery; Michael Towner; Sue Nott; John Rice
- Producers: Ian Hamilton; Meabh Tammemagi; Mark Cumberton
- Running time: 16 minutes
- Production company: JAM Media

Original release
- Network: TRTÉ; RTÉ TWO; CBBC; CBeebies; ABC Kids
- Release: 3 October 2016 – 6 July 2017

Related
- Roy; The Roy Files

Little ROY is an Irish-British live-action animated children's television series, filmed in Cardiff, United Kingdom, which is broadcast by TRTÉ and RTÉ TWO In Ireland, CBBC and CBeebies in the United Kingdom and ABC Kids in Australia. It began and also airs on CBeebies. The show centres on the title character Roy O'Brien, the 5-year-old animated son of a live-action family. The series is a prequel of Roy, another Irish television show which ran from 1 July 2009 to 7 April 2015. Creator of Roy, Alan Shannon, is the series director.

The series was available on BBC iPlayer but was permanently removed (as of 2023).

A third series was planned, but it was cancelled.

== Plot ==
The show follows the everyday life of five-year-old Roy O'Brien, a hyperactive and playful little boy. Little Roy is a live action/animation hybrid with Roy as the main character. Each episode will follow a day in the life of the cartoon, as his cartoon abilities always cause some form of mayhem. To solve his real life dilemma, Roy escapes into his imagination. He takes on the persona of 'Wonder Roy', and with his friend Finn, he plays out his particular predicament of the day and finds a solution.

== Cast ==
- Susie Power as Roy O'Brien (voice)
- Maclean Burke as Bill O'Brien
- Niamh McCann as Maura O'Brien
- Robyn Dempsey as Becky O'Brien
- Des Keogh as Reg Barker
- Billie Traynor as Barbara Barker
- Lucia Evans as Joan Jones
- Keith Duffy as Jimmy Jones
- Reece Adenusi as Tristan Jones
- Paul Tylak as Various (voice)
- Rebecca Walsh as Various (voice)

== Series overview ==
Series	Episodes	Originally released	
Series	Episodes	First released	Last released
1	26	10 October 2016	11 March 2017
2	25	26 June 2017	10 September 2017
Christmas Special		14 December 2017	

== Episodes ==
=== Series 1 (2016–17) ===
No. overall	No. in season	Title	Directed by	Written by	Original release date
1	1	"Pass it On"	Rob Burke and Ronan Burke	Rachel Kilfeather	3 October 2016 (BBC iPlayer); 10 October 2016 (CBBC)
Maura decides that Roy should go through his toys and give away the ones he doesn't play with anymore.
2	2	"Roy's New Look"	Rob Burke and Ronan Burke	Trevor J. Colgan	11 October 2016
Roy is crestfallen to realise he cannot change the way he looks.
3	3	"Oh Brother!"	Rob Burke and Ronan Burke	Mark Hodkinson	12 October 2016
Roy discovers that his dream of having a younger brother named Zip has come true.
4	4	"Flushed Away"	Rob Burke and Ronan Burke	Senta Rich	13 October 2016
Roy knocks the loo roll off the shelf and into the toilet bowl, causing it to block.
5	5	"Roy O'Clock"	Rob Burke and Ronan Burke	Senta Rich	14 October 2016
When Roy sneaks a look at Mr Barker's old cuckoo clock, he accidentally breaks it.
6	6	"Stormy Nighty Knight"	Rob Burke and Ronan Burke	Dave Rice	17 October 2016
When the lights go out during a storm, Roy generates a cartoon light bulb to keep the dark at bay.
7	7	"Mega Sucker"	Rob Burke and Ronan Burke	Ciaran Murtagh and Andrew Jones	18 October 2016
Bill is in charge while Maura is away and the place is a mess. They have until lunchtime to get the house back in order.
8	8	"Let's Rock"	Rob Burke and Ronan Burke	Anto Howard	19 October 2016
Becky is disheartened with her triangle performance, and Roy wonders how he can help her get the timing right.
9	9	"Wakey Wakey"	Rob Burke and Ronan Burke	Sonia Haccius and Borja Espana Guillot	20 October 2016
Roy and Becky are excited about visiting a farm tomorrow and need to get a good night's rest. But they can't fall asleep!
10	10	"Gnomey O’Brien"	Rob Burke and Ronan Burke	Trevor J. Colgan	21 October 2016
Roy and Bill accidentally break Mr Barker's garden gnome. After repairing his hat, Roy grows attached to Gnomey.
11	11	"The Big Cover Up"	Rob Burke and Ronan Burke	Justin Carr and Sinéad Fagan	24 October 2016
It's a sunny day and Roy gets sunburnt, causing him to turn into a lobster.
12	12	"Sweet Tooth"	Rob Burke and Ronan Burke	Sonia Haccius and Borja Espana Guillot	25 October 2016
Roy loses a tooth, Toothy - a cute animated tooth, with a penchant for sweets.
13	13	"Team O'Brien"	Rob Burke and Ronan Burke	Anto Howard	26 October 2016
Roy tries to help Bill break his record for the number of chores done in a day.
14	14	"Little Roy of Sunshine"	Rob Burke and Ronan Burke	Becky Overton	28 January 2017
One morning, Roy wakes up and realises he is being followed by a wispy little cartoon cloud.
15	15	"Little Roy Blue"	Rob Burke and Ronan Burke	Andrew Emerson	29 January 2017
When Roy puts on Maura's mood ring, he ends up changing colours rather than the ring.
16	16	"Magic"	Rob Burke and Ronan Burke	Laura Summers	4 February 2017
When Mr Barker shows Roy some magic tricks, he is determined to wow everyone with a magic show.
17	17	"Now You See Me, Now You Don't"	Rob Burke and Ronan Burke	Trevor J. Colgan	5 February 2017
Roy breaks Becky's dollhouse and doesn't say sorry, so Becky ignores him, causing him to turn invisible.
18	18	"Doctor Roy"	Rob Burke and Ronan Burke	Jayne Kirkham	11 February 2017
Roy is excited to play doctor with the new toy set Becky has given him.
19	19	"Stuck on Remote"	Rob Burke and Ronan Burke	Ciaran Murtagh and Andrew Jones	12 February 2017
While watching TV, Roy accidentally swallows the remote, which starts activating him instead of the TV.
20	20	"Too Many Roys"	Rob Burke and Ronan Burke	Ciarán Morrison and Mick O'Hara	18 February 2017
Roy daydreams about leading a troop of mini Little Roys, but they escape from his thought bubble and cause havoc.
21	21	"Egg Chasers"	Rob Burke and Ronan Burke	Trevor J. Colgan	19 February 2017
Roy becomes hugely unpopular at an Easter egg hunt when he finds every single egg.
22	22	"Roy's Resort"	Rob Burke and Ronan Burke	Trevor Neal and Simon Hickson	25 February 2017
Tristan and his family are going on holiday, so Roy tries to earn enough money to pay for his own family holiday.
23	23	"Squeaky Clean"	Rob Burke and Ronan Burke	Ciaran Murtagh and Andrew Jones	26 February 2017
While playing with his toy shark, Roy learns there can be wrinkly consequences of spending too long in the bath.
24	24	"Toy Roy"	Rob Burke and Ronan Burke	Mark Hodkinson	4 March 2017
Tristan's cousin Lucy is visiting. When a mix-up means that she mistakes Roy for a toy, he has to go along with it.
25	25	"Let It Snow"	Rob Burke and Ronan Burke	Trevor J. Colgan	5 March 2017
Roy and Becky decide to make their own snow from Roy's cartoon cloud, but Roy is unable to stop the snow falling.
26	26	"Chicken Little Roy"	Rob Burke and Ronan Burke	Trevor J. Colgan	11 March 2017
When Becky gets chicken pox, Bill and Maura shower her with affection, making Roy feel left out.

=== Series 2 (2017) ===
No. overall	No. in season	Title	Directed by	Written by	Original release date
27	1	"My Hero"	Rob Burke and Ronan Burke	Siân Quill	26 June 2017
Becky's making a scrapbook of her hero for a school project and Roy is eager to know who Becky's hero is! When Roy's curiosity lands him in the scrapbook, will they be able to get him out or will he be stuck in her glitterverse… forever?
28	2	"Something Fishy"	Rob Bruke and Ronan Burke	Hillary Reynolds	27 June 2017
When Roy hears about Mr Barker's fishing obsession, he becomes convinced that his goldfish is in danger.
29	3	"Genie Roy"	Rob Bruke and Ronan Burke	Dave Rice	28 June 2017
Roy, Becky and Tristan sell wares for Mrs Barker, but a mean stallholder loses them a sale.
30	4	"Say Cheese"	Rob Bruke and Ronan Burke	Chris Dicker and Trevor J. Colgan	29 June 2017
Roy and Becky can't stand still and behave themselves for the O'Brien's family photo.
31	5	"Goals"	Rob Bruke and Ronan Burke	Dave Rice and Trevor J. Colgan	30 June 2017
Becky, Tristan and Roy decide to teach Bill and Mr Jones the importance of teamwork.
32	6	"The Tiara"	Rob Bruke and Ronan Burke	Dave Ingham	3 July 2017
Roy accidentally breaks Becky's tiara that she absolutely loves. As Roy's guilt grows, so does he!
33	7	"Bring Back Becky"	Rob Bruke and Ronan Burke	Ciarán Morrison and Mick O'Hara	4 July 2017
Roy finds it hard to spend a Saturday without Becky and is determined to make a photo frame for her return.
34	8	"Rumble Roy"	Rob Bruke and Ronan Burke	Clare Dowling	5 July 2017
Roy's frustration gets the better of him while building the mega tall tower of titans with Tristan.
35	9	"My Shadow And I"	Rob Bruke And Ronan Burke	Malcom Moloney	6 July 2017
Roy doesn't feel like his normal self when he gets separated from his shadow.
