= Red Rock (TV series) =

Irish television series (2015–2020)

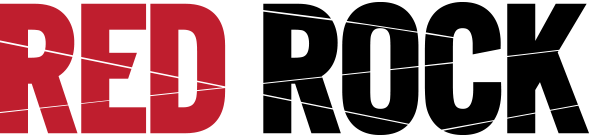
- Genre: Soap opera Police procedural
- Created by: Peter McKenna
- Starring: List of cast members
- Theme music composer: Debbie Wiseman
- Country of origin: Ireland
- Original language: English
- No. of series: 3
- No. of episodes: 175 (list of episodes)

Production
- Executive producers: Ed Guiney; Peter McKenna; John Yorke
- Producers: Trevor Colgan; Hugh Farley; Paula Heffernan; Lauren MacKenzie; David Mansell; Gareth Philips
- Production locations: John Player Factory, South Circular Road Dublin 8 Dún Laoghaire, Rathdown; Howth, Northside, Dublin
- Cinematography: Ciarán Tanham
- Editors: Sean Keeley; Malcolm Moloney; Brian O'Neill; John Phillipson
- Camera setup: Single-camera setup
- Running time: Regular episodes: 22 minutes (2015–2016); 45 minutes (2016–2019); Special episodes: 90 minutes
- Production companies: Element Pictures; Company Pictures

Original release
- Network: Virgin Media One
- Release: 7 January 2015 – 8 January 2020

Red Rock is an Irish soap opera, set in the fictional seaside town of Red Rock, that aired on Virgin Media One from 2015 to 2020. Focusing on the activities of the detectives of the local Garda Síochána station and townsfolk, three series of the programme were broadcast, concluding just over five years from the date of its debut, on January 8, 2020.

The series featured an ensemble cast of recognisable Irish talent, including Richard Flood, Conor Mullen, Jane McGrath and Cathy Belton, and was filmed on location in Dublin, including studios based at the old John Player Factory, as well as Howth and Dún Laoghaire. The series was partly funded by the Broadcasting Authority of Ireland, from the Sound and Vision Fund.

A total of 117 episodes were broadcast. Internationally, the series broadcast to viewers in the UK on BBC One daytime from 2016, and across the pond on Amazon Prime to viewers in the United States from 2017. Notably, American viewers received the broadcast of episodes towards' the end of the series run before anywhere else in the world.

== Broadcast ==
The series was broadcast as part of TV3's prime-time schedule, initially airing on Wednesdays and Thursdays at 8:30pm. Upon commission, the channel revealed that forty weeks worth of episodes had been slated, to air right through until December of that year, with a mid-series break. From September 2016, the series received a major overhaul, with the theme tune being replaced and episodes extended to double length, with only one episode broadcast per week. The series was also moved to 9:00pm on Mondays to allow for story lines and scenes to be grittier, as the series would be post-watershed. A special double episode, commemorating two years on air, was broadcast on 9 January 2017.

In Ireland, the first episode pulled in an average viewership of 0.32m. Despite a brief slump in ratings, it grew to become TV3's most popular show, with repeats of the first series airing during the summer hiatus due to viewer demand. In January 2017, it was suggested the series could be axed due to falling viewing figures, but a TV3 representative stated that figures have been "increasing at a steady pace", and confirmed further episodes had since been commissioned.

Internationally, the series is broadcast on BBC One in the UK (during Doctors summer break, (except Episodes 8–30, as they were broadcast on BBC Two as Rio 2016 was broadcast on BBC One, and Episodes 36 and 37 in the last series on respectively 30 March and 31 March 2020 because London Kills was broadcast on BBC One), and in North America and in New Zealand, the series is available for download via Amazon Prime. The first episode to be broadcast on the BBC drew viewing figures upwards of 1.1 million, bringing the total of Episode One to 1.42m, and received positive reviews from viewers and critics alike.

== Cancellation ==
In August 2017, the series was placed on hiatus by TV3 due to the lease on the current set expiring, and the production having to be moved to a newly built set. This subsequently resulted in the second half of the third series, which was due to air from September 2017, being delayed until 2018. TV3 director of programming Bill Malone also stated that the viewing figures for these episodes would ultimately decide on the series' long-term future.

At the time of hiatus, a further twenty-three episodes were confirmed to have been filmed. It was also reported that despite it being publicised as a hiatus, production on the series had actually ceased, with props and sets being sold off at public auction. It was later reported that a further two episodes would be filmed in the autumn of that year, with an insider disclosing to The Herald; "Twenty-three episodes for next year are already shot and in the can. But what isn't generally known is that two more episodes are being made which will be shot late this year." However, despite this, only twenty-three episodes were slated for broadcast, suggesting these episodes were never actually filmed.

Thirteen of the remaining twenty-three episodes aired on TV3 from January 2018, while eight of the remaining ten episodes were premiered exclusively via Amazon Prime in the United States on the date of the mid-season finale, 23 April 2018. These eight episodes were broadcast on TV3, by then rebranded as Virgin Media One, from February 2019. The final two episodes, filmed in October 2017, were broadcast on 6 and 8 January 2020, respectively.

== Cast ==
=== Main characters ===
==== Gardaí ====
- Richard Flood as Garda Superintendent James McKay (Series 1)
- Conor Mullen as Garda Superintendent Kevin Dunne (Series 2–3)
- Jane McGrath as Garda/Detective Sharon Cleere (Series 1–3.1, 3.3)
- Patrick Ryan as Garda Paudge Brennan (Series 1–3)
- David Crowley as Garda Sean Holden (Series 1–3)
- Boyko Krastanov as Garda Adrijan Kosos (Series 1–2.1)
- Leah Minto as Garda Ash Cahill (Series 3)
- Sean Mahon as Garda Sergeant Brian McGonigle (Series 1–2.1)
- Andrea Irvine as Garda Sergeant/Detective Sergeant Angela Tyrell (Series 1–3)
- Paul Hickey as Garda Sergeant Johno O'Riordan (Series 2.2—3)
- Valerie O'Connor as Garda Detective Inspector Nikki Grogan (Series 1–2)
- Chris Newman as Garda Detective Rory Walsh (Series 1–3)
- Carol O'Reilly as Detective's Clerk Linda McNulty (Series 3)

==== Townsfolk ====
- Cathy Belton as Patricia Hennessy (Series 1–3)
- Adam Weafer as David Hennessy (Series 1–3)
- Jack Nolan as Michael Hennessy (Series 1–3.1)
- Pandora McCormick as Claire Hennessy (Series 1–3.1)
- Paul Roe as Vincent Kiely (Series 1–3)
- Denise McCormack as Bridget Kiely (Series 1–3)
- Stephen Cromwell as Keith Kiely (Series 1–3)
- India Mullen as Katie Kiely (Series 1–2)
- Anthony Brophy as Liam Reid (Series 1–2)
- Róisín O'Donovan as Niamh Reid (Series 1–3)
- Ann Skelly as Rachel Reid (Series 1–3)
- Liam Carney as Tommy Tyrell (Series 1–3.1)
- Darragh O'Toole as Connor Tyrell (Series 1–3.2)
- Mary Conroy as Alice Bruton (Series 2.2—3)

=== Recurring characters ===
- Darren Cahill as Davey Webb (Series 1–2.1)
- Andy Kellegher as Brendan "Beady" Burke (Series 1–2.1)
- Stephen Jones as Francis "Laser" Byrne (Series 1–3.1)
- Lorna Meade as Aoife Burke (Series 1–3.2)
- Brid McCarthy as Maggie Brennan (Series 1–3)
- Melanie McHugh as Jules McGonigle (Series 2)
- Shauna Higgins as Melanie McGonigle (Series 1–2)
- Sarah Jane Seymour as Siobhán Reilly (Series 1–2)
- Jonathan Byrne as Joe Fallon (Series 2.1)
- Natalia Cooper as Irena Bajorek (Series 2.1, 3.2—3.3)
- Maghnús Foy as Robbie Scanlon (Series 2.2—3.1)
- Ronan Graham as Mick Moran (Series 2–3)
- Brian Roche as Little Barry (Series 3)
- Barry O'Connor as Tom Callaghan (Series 3)
- Joe Gallagher as Eugene Casey (Series 3)
- Fiona Hewitt-Twamley as Allis Scanlon (Series 3.1)
- Patrick Bergin as Jim Tierney (Series 3.1)

== Plot ==
=== Series 1 (2015) ===
==== The Kielys and the Hennessys ====
Darren Kiely is found badly beaten on Red Rock Pier; he later dies from his injuries. This brings absent mother Bridget Kiely back into the lives of her children Katie and Keith, and husband Vincent. Michael Hennessy is the lead suspect for the assault; this re-ignites a feud between the Kielys and the Hennessys. To make the situation more complicated Michael's brother David is in a relationship with Katie, something he keeps secret from his solicitor sister Claire and overbearing mother Patricia.

Soon after Bridget comes home, she discovers a box of cash hidden in Darren's room. She keeps quiet about the cash and spends most of it. It is soon revealed that this cash was blackmail money Darren was receiving from David to keep his relationship with Katie secret. Darren was demanding more and more money, causing an angry confrontation between Darren and the Hennessy brothers which resulted in his death. A bitter and angry Michael revealed this to Katie who quickly ended the relationship and reported David's involvement with Darren's death to the gardaí.

David is eventually cleared of all charges due to lack of evidence; he was just about to move on with his life when Katie tells him that she is pregnant and he's the father. They plan to travel to England for an abortion, funded and encouraged by Patricia but Vincent and Bridget think she should keep the baby. As series one ends we see Katie trying to decide whether she should get on the plane or not.

==== Sharon Cleere and Brian McGonigle ====
Garda Sharon Cleere is new to Red Rock garda station. Not long into investigating what happened the night Darren Kiely died she is scanning CCTV footage for the suspect when she sees Sergeant Brian McGonigle in a car kissing a teenage girl in a school uniform. Shocked and disgusted, she takes a copy of the footage and shows it to her partner, Garda Paudge Brennan. Paudge advises her to forget about it and leave it alone. Sharon decides to show the footage to Brian, telling him that an anonymous woman dropped it in. Brian explains that it was just a misunderstanding, thanks Sharon and keeps the footage.

Sharon discovers that the girl is 15 (underage), her name is Rachel, she is friends with Brian's daughter Mel and her father, Liam, who owns the Neptune Café, is a friend of Brian. When Sharon sees Brian with Rachel again she confronts him, Brian gets physically threatening and tells her to back off. Sharon then approaches Rachel and appeals for her to tell somebody about Brian. Rachel denies everything and tells Brian about Sharon. Brian arranges to have Sharon beaten badly while on a call to a break-in at a warehouse, while making it look like he saved her.

Sharon comes back to work despite Brian's efforts. He encourages her to apply for a transfer and when she refuses he begins to bully her at every opportunity while making her look incompetent at her work. This all gets to be too much for Sharon, who lashes out and attacks Brian. When questioned by Superintendent James McKay Sharon breaks down and tells him everything. That's when McKay reveals that Brian has already spoken to him, telling him that Sharon has been harassing him ever since she came on to him and he turned her down and that she'll accuse him of having an affair with an underage girl. Brian's lies cast doubt on everything Sharon says and she becomes an outcast in the station.

Despite the lack of evidence Rachel's father Liam and her sister Niamh are made aware of Sharon's accusations and Rachel is questioned; she denies everything but Liam believes she is lying. As the pressure to tell the truth builds up Rachel becomes distraught and runs away. For several days nobody knows where Rachel is until she makes contact with Brian, who finds her hiding out in a caravan park. She wants to run away with him but instead Brian ends his relationship with Rachel and tells her to go back home. She agrees and Brian leaves.

The next day Rachel still hasn't returned, she becomes suicidal and starts taking sleeping pills mixed with vodka. Doped and nearly dead she calls Brian, who panics and asks for the afternoon off. Sharon and Paudge get wind of this and suspect he knows where Rachel is and decide to follow him. Sharon turns on the GPS on Paudge's phone and glues it to Brian's car. Brian gets to the caravan park where he finds Rachel unconscious; he decides to call for an ambulance but then changes his mind. Sharon and Paudge have tracked Brian to the caravan park and go searching the caravans. As Brian tries to sneak off Sharon catches him and eventually cuffs and arrests him. She finds Rachel and calls an ambulance. McKay and several other Red Rock gardaí arrive on the scene shocked to discover the truth about Brian.

Rachel survives her suicide attempt but is still denying she was in a relationship with Brian. As she is being questioned Brian arrives at the station; he pleads his case to McKay who eventually punches him and sends him to the cells. After talking to Sharon about how Brian was about to let her die, Rachel is convinced to tell the truth about her sexual relationship with Brian.

==== Paudge Brennan ====
As well as being a garda, Paudge Brennan is a "property tycoon". He owns several houses in Red Rock and is constantly chasing tenants for rent, going so far as selling debt to nefarious loan sharks. When he's not chasing people who owe him money he himself is being pursued for money he owes to contractors who have worked on his house. One such contractor, unhappy with the payment Paudge settles on, tears the wiring he did out of the walls. Paudge is frustrated and broke, if he doesn't start making money soon he'll lose his mother's house.

Sharon arranges a friend to repair the damage at a cut rate and Paudge is placated. Unfortunately over the past few weeks he has made an enemy of local petty criminal Ollie Coyne. Ollie breaks into the house and proceeds to vandalise it. Paudge gets the call from the alarm company and heads to the house. He arrives just as Ollie has finished destroying the place, and as he enters Ollie hides. Paudge breaks down when he sees the extensive damage done to his property. He then notices a still-lit cigarette butt belonging to Ollie. He fans the cigarette butt, purposely setting fire to the house. What Paudge doesn't know is that Ollie is secretly recording him on his phone.

==== Sean Holden and Adrijan Kosos ====
Garda Sean Holden and Garda Adrijan Kosos are partners and best friends. In the past few months their friendship has gone through a lot - namely a love triangle with Detective Nikki Grogan. Both Sean and Adrijan showed an interest in Nikki and Nikki and Sean began a secret relationship. Adrijan continued his flirtation with Nikki and her rejection was only worsened by discovering her and Sean together as well as Sean's mockery of the situation. The tension between the two grew until Sean pulled a car over for a petty reason. While asking for the driver's licence and registration Adrijan was suddenly run down by a mystery car in the mid season finale. Two months later it is revealed that Adrijan survived but he may have long term damage resulting in headaches and mood swings.

==== Angela Tyrell ====
Sergeant Angela is a mother to Red Rock station as well as at home. However, it is her family life that's proving harder to maintain. Her husband Tommy is seeing another woman as he feels it is a loveless marriage that they are just maintaining for the sake of their sons, Conor (a struggling university student) and Stephen, a footballing prodigy. Angela is struggling to keep it together but that's tough with such a demanding job. It is no surprise that she doesn't notice Conor's growing heroin addiction. When Conor's name is mentioned as a student known to be involved with drugs during an investigation at his university, everything falls into place - Angela and Tommy rush home to find Conor strung out with track marks on his arm.

==== James McKay ====
The footage of Paudge committing arson finds its way into the hands of crime boss Beady Burke. Beady uses it to blackmail Paudge into leaking him confidential garda information and do his bidding. One of the jobs Beady gives Paudge is to inform McKay of the drug dealing operation of his competition, Laser Byrne. When Laser's operation is shut down he blames a young man who works for him, Davey Webb. Davey is stabbed on the Ridge Estate and saved by McKay, McKay decides Davey is the key to bringing down Laser for good and takes him on as an unofficial informant.

McKay becomes convinced that there's a rat and eventually starts to suspect Paudge. The bureau is brought in to investigate, and Paudge is given the all clear, but McKay isn't convinced. Meanwhile, Webb is having a tough time being McKay's informant: Laser knows what he's up to and has his house petrol bombed - Davey's younger sister Chloe is scarred for life. Davey's furious at McKay for what he's been dragged into. McKay sends him away for his own safety but Davey disappears. McKay eventually goes to confront Paudge. Paudge admits to McKay that he's the one leaking information, and McKay brings him down to the station to make a statement. As he exits the car McKay is stabbed by a masked attacker, Davey Webb. Paudge tries to fight him but is stabbed in the process. James McKay dies in the car park of Red Rock garda station.

=== Series 2 (2016) ===
==== McKay's Killer ====
There's a manhunt for McKay's killer. Davey Webb pays a visit to Claire, now a grieving widow, she deciphers from his behaviour that he was the one who killed McKay and he goes on the run only to be eventually caught by Sean and Adrijan. Davey eventually admits his guilt and is sent down for murder. Meanwhile, a guilt ridden Paudge eventually lets it slip to Sharon that he was giving Beady garda information and McKay found out. Sharon is furious at first and tells him to confess to the new boss Nikki. Only when Beady is found dead Sharon stops Paudge and tells him to keep quiet about his crime.

==== Adrijan's Departure ====
Adrijan is increasingly unpredictable since his brain injury forcing Nikki to take him off active duty. Adrijan can't stand this and decides it is time to leave Red Rock and return home to Croatia.

==== Brian McGonigle Returns ====
Brian hasn't been seen since his charge of sexual relations with a minor but arrives back in Red Rock with a plan. To reunite with his family, restart his relationship with Rachel and convince her to retract her statement, blackmail Angela into not testifying at his trial and besmirch Sharon's name. All is going to plan for Brian until his wife Jules works out she's being lied to and kicks him out the day before the trial begins. The next day Brian doesn't show up at his trial, a few days later his body washes up on a beach. Brian has been murdered.

There are several suspects in the investigation of Brian's murder, each one with a motive.

- Sharon: Brian has harassed Sharon, had her beaten and told lies about her.
- Liam: Liam understandably hates Brian for what he's done to his daughter and has already shown he has a temper and has already assaulted Brian in an attempt to get him to stay away from Rachel
- Jules: Brian's wife, she finally found out that her husband has been lying to her and having an affair with an underage girl.
- Rachel: Brian has been leading Rachel along for a long time now, having told her they were going to run away together. Did she find out that was never going to happen?
- Conor: Conor has been weaned off heroin in smaller and smaller doses, meaning his parents have to purchase illegal drugs for him. Brian found out and was blackmailing Angela. Also Conor was briefly in a relationship with Rachel and may have become jealous of Brian.
- Mick: A local criminal who had a vendetta against Brian, Paudge sneaked him his address, did he do anything about it?

It is revealed through flashback that Rachel killed Brian with a lead pipe when he tried to go on the run leaving her behind. Her father Liam showed up soon after and helped her to dispose of the body. Unfortunately due to the gardaí having the wrong murder weapon (a wheel brace with Brian's blood and Conor's prints on it from an earlier minor scuffle between the pair) DNA evidence points to Conor as the killer. Rachel and Liam decide to keep quiet as the evidence piles up against Conor and Angela's career and reputation gets more and more damaged as she fights to clear her son's name. While Conor is in prison awaiting his court date a fellow prisoner finds out that he is the son of a garda and stabs him. The guilt proves to be too much for Liam and he hands himself in, claiming he and he alone killed Brian. Conor is cleared of all charges and survives the stabbing. Nikki is used as a scapegoat and sent for retraining in Donegal.
