= Peter Campion (actor) =

Irish actor

- Born: 1987 (38–39); Birr, County Offaly, Ireland
- Education: Guildhall School of Music and Drama
- Occupation: Actor
- Years active: 2010–present
- Spouse: Valerie O'Connor
- Children: 2

Peter Campion (born 1987) (sometimes credited as Art Campion) is an Irish actor and presenter. He is best known for his roles in the RTÉ One drama Love/Hate (2010–2011) and the Channel 4 sitcoms London Irish (2013) Derry Girls (2018–2022) and How to Get to Heaven from Belfast (2026).

== Early life ==
Campion grew up in Birr, County Offaly. His family moved to the Dublin suburb of Dartry when he was 12. He attended boarding school Clongowes Wood College in County Kildare for secondary school where he participated in school plays. He moved to London for drama school, training at the London Academy of Music and Dramatic Art (LAMDA), going on to graduate from the Guildhall School of Music and Drama in 2010.

== Career ==
Upon graduation from Guildhall, Campion played Galanba in the Royal National Theatre production of The White Guard. That same year, he began appearing on television as Stumpy Doyle in Love/Hate and Dr. Jack Flynn in Raw. He starred in the Edinburgh production of The Lieutenant of Inishmore. He played Ronan McCann in the first and second series of the BBC Two Northern Ireland drama 6Degrees. In 2013, he starred as Packy Kennedy in the Channel 4 sitcom London Irish.

In 2015, Campion made his film debut as George Sheridan in Brooklyn. This was followed by the musical Sing Street and the St. Patrick's Day segment of the horror anthology Holidays. He starred in the Belfast production of The Pillowman.

Campion narrates Irish version of the reality show First Dates. In 2017, he appeared in the EastEnders limited spinoff Kat & Alfie: Redwater and the horror film The Cured.

In 2018, Campion began playing the guest role of Father Peter in the Channel 4 sitcom Derry Girls. That same year, he landed the roles of Joe in the second series of Can't Cope, Won't Cope as well as theatre roles in Autumn Royal and Furniture. The following year, Campion had a recurring role as Mickey Gibbs in series 5 of the BBC One series Peaky Blinders.

Campion played Henry Vickers in the Acorn TV crime drama Dead Still and the teacher Sweeney in the coming-of-age film Dating Amber in 2020, and the Roman consul Libo in the Sky Atlantic series Domina in 2021.

== Personal life ==
Campion lives in Avoca Co. Wicklow with actress Valerie O'Connor and their two children.

== Filmography ==
=== Film ===
Year	Title	Role	Notes
2015	Brooklyn	George Sheridan	
2015	Too Shall Pass	Tef	Short film
2016	Sing Street	Evan	
2016	Holidays	The Man	Anthology: St. Patrick's Day
2016	The Flag	Hammer	
2017	The Cured	Luke	
2017	6am News	Tef	Short film
2019	Cynthia	David	Short film
2019	The Dream Report	Narrator (voice)	Short film
2020	Dating Amber	Sweeney	
2020	Gone Viral	Fachtna Browne	Short film

=== Television ===
Year	Title	Role	Notes
2010	Jack Taylor	Anthony Bradford-Hemple	2 episodes
2010–2011	Love/Hate	Stephen "Stumpy" Doyle	6 episodes (series 1–2)
2010–2011	Raw	Dr. Jack Flynn	5 episodes (series 3)
2012–2013	6Degrees	Ronan McCann	Series 1–2
2013	Lawless	Niall Burton	Television film
2013	London Irish	Patrick "Packy" Kennedy	6 episodes
2016	Trial of the Century	Willie Pearse	Episode: "The Defence of Patrick H. Pearse"
2016–present	First Dates	Narrator	
2017	Kat & Alfie: Redwater	Andrew Kelly	6 episodes
2018–2022	Derry Girls	Father Peter Conway	4 episodes
2018	Can't Cope, Won't Cope	Joe	5 episodes
2019	Peaky Blinders	Mickey Gibbs	3 episodes (series 5)
2020	Dead Still	Henry Vickers	5 episodes
2021	Domina	Libo	6 episodes
2023	Significant Other	Mr. Fitzgerald	Episode #1.2
2023–2024	Blue Lights	Sully	5 episodes
2024	Faithless	Cormac	6 episodes
2026	How To Get To Heaven From Belfast	Jim	4 episodes

=== Video games ===
Year	Title	Role	Notes
TBA	Squadron 42	Brian "Weezy" Weiters	

== Stage ==
Year	Title	Role	Notes
2010	The White Guard	Galanba	Royal National Theatre, London
2011	Perve	Nick	Peacock Theatre, Dublin
2012	The Lieutenant of Inishmore	Padraic	Royal Lyceum Theatre, Edinburgh
2015	The Pillowman	Katurian	Lyric Theatre, Belfast
2018	Autumn Royal	Timothy	Ireland tour
2018	Furniture	Ed	Mick Lally Theatre, Galway International Arts Festival
2022	The Lonesome West		Gaiety Theatre, Dublin
