= Dark Touch =

- Directed by: Marina de Van
- Written by: Marina de Van
- Produced by: Andrew Lowe, Patrick Sobelman, Jean Luc Ormieres
- Starring: Missy Keating, Marcella Plunkett, Pádraic Delaney
- Cinematography: John Conroy
- Edited by: Mike Fromentin
- Music by: Christophe Chassol
- Production companies: Ex Nihilo, Element Pictures, Filmgate Films, Film i Väst
- Release date: 18 April 2013 (Tribeca Film Festival)
- Running time: 90 minutes
- Countries: France; Ireland; Sweden
- Language: English
- Budget: €2.7 million

Dark Touch is a 2013 French-Irish-Swedish supernatural horror film that was directed and written by Marina de Van. The film had its world premiere on 18 April 2013 at the Tribeca Film Festival and stars Missy Keating as the sole survivor of a bloody massacre that caused the deaths of her family.

== Synopsis ==
Eleven-year-old Niamh (Missy Keating) and her family live in an extremely small and isolated community in Ireland where her only contact with other people comes in the form of school and her neighbors Nat (Marcella Plunkett) and Lucas (Pádraic Delaney). She claims that their house is coming alive but when Nat and Lucas discover Niamh bruised and bloody, her parents say that Niamh herself is causing the destruction. Niamh is later discovered as the sole survivor of an extremely violent attack that killed everyone else in the house. She tells the police that the house is responsible for her parents' deaths and for her infant brother's suffocation in her arms, but the police attribute the massacre to vandals. Niamh's neighbors decide to take her in and try to help soothe her pain, but they soon find that whatever caused the problems in Niamh's old house are now beginning to present themselves in their home.

== Cast ==
- Missy Keating as Niamh
- Marcella Plunkett as Nat Galin
- Pádraic Delaney as Lucas Galin
- Charlotte Flyvholm as Tanya Collins
- Stephen Wall as Mathew Collins
- Ella Hayes as Emily
- Robert Donnelly as Ryan Galin
- Susie Power as Lucy Galin
- Richard Dormer as Henry
- Catherine Walker as Maud
- Simon Boyle as Mr. Brennan
- Olga Wehrly as Colette
- Mark Huberman as Joseph
- Katie Kirby as Lisbeth
- Clare Barrett as Christine
- Art Parkinson as Peter

== Reception ==
Critical reception for Dark Touch has been mostly positive and the film holds a rating of 73% on Rotten Tomatoes (based on 11 reviews) and 64 on Metacritic (based on 5 reviews).

=== Awards ===
- Denis-de-Rougemont Youth Award at the Neuchâtel International Fantastic Film Festival (2013, won)
- Mad Movies Award at the Neuchâtel International Fantastic Film Festival (2013, won)
- Narcisse Award for Best Feature Film at the Neuchâtel International Fantastic Film Festival (2013, won)
- Maria Award for Best Motion Picture at the Sitges - Catalan International Film Festival (2013, nominated)
