= Roy (TV series) =

Irish animated children's television series

- Title card
- Genre: Animation; Comedy drama Fantasy comedy Live-action; Mockumentary; Sitcom
- Starring: Simon Delaney; Cathy Belton; Mark Lambert; Paul Tylak; Martha Bryne
- Voices of: Scott Graham (Series 1–2); Robert Donnelly (Series 3–4)
- Narrated by: Richard Albrecht
- Composer: Darren Hendley
- Countries of origin: Ireland; Canada
- Original language: English
- No. of series: 4
- No. of episodes: 52

Production
- Production locations: Ballyfermot, County Dublin (Series 1-2); Sandyford, County Dublin (Series 3-4)
- Running time: 22 minutes
- Production companies: JAM Media; Studio B Productions; Copernicus Studios

Original release
- Network: TRTÉ
- Release: 1 July 2009 – 7 April 2015

Related
- Badly Drawn Roy (2006); The Roy Files (2015–16); Little Roy (2016-17)

Roy is an Irish-Canadian live-action animated children's television series which was broadcast by TRTÉ in Ireland, CBBC in the United Kingdom and ABC3 in Australia. It aired from 1 July 2009 to 1 April 2015.

The show centres on the titular character Roy O'Brien. He is portrayed as the 11-year-old animated son of a live-action family. Episodes mostly revolve around the adventures and challenges he faces as he settles into his new school in a suburb of Dublin.

The series is filmed as a mockumentary and based on the short film Badly Drawn Roy, which was commissioned by the Irish Film Board, RTÉ and the Arts Council of Ireland through their frameworks scheme for new animation.

== Production ==
The series was commissioned by CBBC and produced with funding from RTÉ and the Broadcasting Authority of Ireland. Both the series and the short film were produced by JAM Media. Roy's character animation is hand drawn in Flash with the compositing and effects produced in Adobe After Effects.

A second season was broadcast in early 2012. In November 2012, the second season of Roy won the 2012 Children's BAFTA Drama Award.

Filming began on a third and fourth season in January 2013. The third season began airing on 23 January 2014, and the fourth began airing 20 January 2015.

== Main cast ==
Series	Actor	Role	Notes
Series 1-4	Richard Albrecht	Narrator	
Series 1-2	Scott Graham	Roy O'Brien	Lead role
Series 3-4	Robert Donnelly	Roy O'Brien	Lead role
Series 1-4	Simon Delaney	Bill O'Brien	Main role, Roy's biological father
Series 1-4	Cathy Belton	Maura O'Brien	Main role, Roy's biological mother
Series 1-4	Martha Byrne	Becky O'Brien	Main role, Roy's biological sister
Series 1-4	Mark Lambert	Mr Derek Hammond	Headteacher (Series 1 - 2), Vice Principal (Series 3 - 4)
Series 1-4	Paul Tylak	Dr Rashid	Doctor
Series 1-2	David Green	Tommy Byrne	Nerd and Roy’s mate
Series 1-2	Fionn O'Shea	Jack Koprowski	Cool Dude and Roy’s mate
Series 1-2	Rebecca Barry	Sinéad	Roy's crush
Series 1-2	Chloe McCormack	Kathy Cunningham	Main Bully
Series 1	Lewis Harris	Connor	Cool Dude
Series 1	Charlene Gleeson	Tara Loveworth	
Series 1	Patrick Murray	Jacks Dad	
Series 1	Holly Walsh	Karisma	
Series 1	Nigel Davey	Sound Man	
Series 1		Ticket Girl	
Series 1-2	Ronan Leahy	Mr Hogan	P.E. teacher
Series 1-2	Pat McGrath	Dennis Gwint	Site manager
Series 1-2	Maud Fahy	Miss Dymphna Sherringham	Teacher
Series 2	Panashe McGuckin	Alex O'Shea	Cool Dude
Series 2	Norma Sheahan	Miss Hegarty	
Series 3-4	Cameron Hogan	Niall	Cool Dude
Series 3-4	Lauren Kinsella	Tara Keating	Roy's crush
Series 3-4	Romey Farrelly	Abby	Cool Girl and Roy’s mate
Series 3-4	Jowon Olatunji	Sean	Cool Dude
Series 3-4	Kian Murphy	Declan	Main Bully
Series 3-4	Brandon Maher	Hendley	Bully's mate
Series 3-4	Harry Behan	Fagan	Bully's mate
Series 3-4	Valerie O'Connor	Miss Jane Jervis	Headteacher
Series 3-4	Sam O’Mahony	Mr Lucey	Science teacher
Series 3	Hiro Ino	Mr Tanaka	

== Episodes ==
Series	Episodes	Start date	End date
1	13	5 August 2009	28 October 2009
2	13	9 January 2012	27 March 2012
3	13	23 January 2014	17 April 2014
4	13	20 January 2015	7 April 2015

=== Series 1 (2009) ===
Overall	In series	Title	Original airdate
1	1	New Boy	5 August 2009
2	2	Growing Pains	12 August 2009
3	3	Sick	19 August 2009
4	4	Charity Case	26 August 2009
5	5	A Matter of Principal	2 September 2009
6	6	Roy Band	9 September 2009
7	7	On the Run	16 September 2009
8	8	Roy and Me	23 September 2009
9	9	Roy Goes to the Movies	30 September 2009
10	10	Roy Pulls a Face	7 October 2009
11	11	Testing, Testing	14 October 2009
12	12	Halo Goodbye	21 October 2009
13	13	School Inspection	28 October 2009

=== Series 2 (2012) ===
Overall	In series	Title	Original airdate
14	1	Foot Fat Fit	9 January 2012
15	2	Roy the Rover	16 January 2012
16	3	Big Head	23 January 2012
17	4	Spot On	30 January 2012
18	5	Death in the Family	6 February 2012
19	6	Pint-Sized Roy	13 February 2012
20	7	A Crushing Blow	20 February 2012
21	8	Magical Roy	27 February 2012
22	9	Invisible Roy	5 March 2012
23	10	DIY Roy	12 March 2012
24	11	The Good, the Bad and the Roy	19 March 2012
25	12	Uncle Troy	26 March 2012
26	13	Roy's Review	27 March 2012

=== Series 3 (2014) ===
Overall	In series	Title	Original airdate
27	1	Roy On Film	23 January 2014
28	2	Attack of the 50 ft Roy	30 January 2014
29	3	Roy's Bad Hair Day	6 February 2014
30	4	Roy's Quest	13 February 2014
31	5	Snookered	20 February 2014
32	6	Supersize Roy	27 February 2014
33	7	The Roy Trap	6 March 2014
34	8	Mocking is Catching	13 March 2014
35	9	Be Careful What You Wish For	20 March 2014
36	10	Konnichi Roy	27 March 2014
37	11	I'm a Big Roy Now	3 April 2014
38	12	Roy's First Kiss	10 April 2014
39	13	Freaky Froyday	17 April 2014

=== Series 4 (2015) ===
Overall	In series	Title	Original airdate
40	1	Roy 2.0	20 January 2015
41	2	Bubble Trouble	27 January 2015
42	3	Stupid Cupid	3 February 2015
43	4	Roy's Terrible Twos	10 February 2015
44	5	Too Cool For School	17 February 2015
45	6	Karma Chameleon	24 February 2015
46	7	Going Ape	3 March 2015
47	8	Blush Hour	10 March 2015
48	9	And the Winner Is...	17 March 2015
49	10	Fright of a Lifetime	24 March 2015
50	11	Roy Junior	31 March 2015
51	12	Buddy	7 April 2015
52	13	Roy, Roy, CGI Boy	7 April 2015

== Franchise ==
Two spin-off series of Roy were announced and commissioned by BBC, forming the Roy franchise. Little Roy is about an animated five year old boy on a journey of self-discovery through imaginative play. It aired from 2016 to 2017 on both CBBC and CBeebies.

The Roy Files is a spin-off that focuses on the life of Roy O'Brien, Ireland's only cartoon boy living in the real world. Roy turns his history homework into a scrapbook about himself that highlights all four seasons of Roy.
