= Mark Lambert (Irish actor) =

Irish actor

Mark Lambert is an Irish actor.

== Filmography ==
Year	Title	Role	Genre
1983	Champions	Sean	biopic
1987	A Prayer for the Dying	Ainsley	crime drama
1996	Jude	Tinker Taylor	period drama
2000	Borstal Boy	Chief Dixon	romantic drama autobiography
2002	Evelyn	Minister of Education	period drama biopic
2003	Veronica Guerin	Willie Kealy	biopic
2004	Vendetta: No Conscience, No Mercy	Dwight	crime drama
2005	Breakfast on Pluto	Bishop's Secretary	comedy drama
2006	The Tiger's Tail	District Judge	comedy-drama; thriller
2009	Savage	Garda Superintendent (voice)	thriller

== Television work ==
Year	Title	Role	Genre	Notes
1975	The Secrets of Isis	Fred	action series	Season 1, Episode 11: "No Drums, No Trumpets"
1984	Caught in a Free State	Sean McGlynn	drama miniseries	all four episodes
1984	The Young Ones	Bank Manager	comedy series	Season 2, Episode 6: "Summer Holiday"
1991	Bottom	Gasman	comedy series	Series 1, Episode 2: "Gas"
1996	Sharpe's Regiment	Colonel Bartholomew Girdwood	historical drama film	
2007	The Tudors	William Cornish	historical drama	Season 1: 2 episodes
2008	Heartbeat	Tom Padgett	ITV drama	Series 17, Episode 14: Take Three Girls
2009–2015	Roy	Mr Hammond	mockumentary series	all episodes
2016–present	Fair City	Trigger Foley	Soap opera	
