= Cathy Belton =

Irish actress (born 1970)

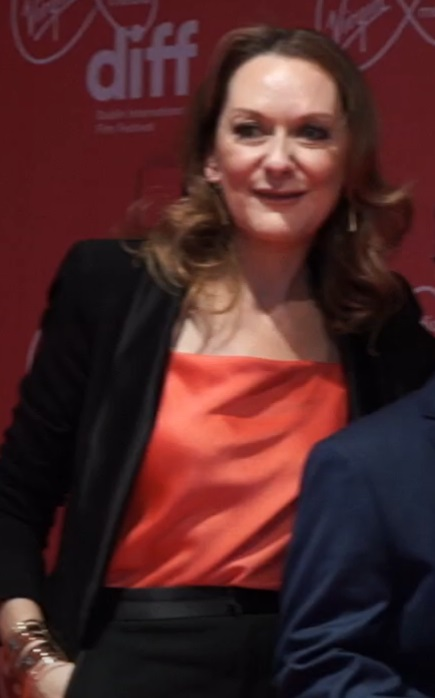
- Belton at DIFF 2020
- Born: 17 January 1970 (age 56); Galway, Ireland
- Education: Trinity College, Dublin
- Occupation: Actress

Cathy Belton (born 17 January 1970) is an Irish actress. Born in the west of Ireland, she is a graduate of Trinity College, Dublin. Her stage work includes many productions in the Abbey Theatre and Gate Theatre. Her television work includes Maura O'Brien in Roy, The Clinic, Glenroe, Red Rock, and Paths to Freedom. She has also appeared in films such as The Tiger's Tail and Intermission.

Belton was nominated for Best Actress at the 2015 IFTA Television Awards, for her performance in Red Rock.

== Filmography ==
=== Film ===
Year	Title	Role	Notes
1993	The Snapper	Desk Nurse	
1995	Circle of Friends	Moaning Girl	
1997	Before I Sleep	Girl at Old Office	Short film
2001	Tubberware	Julia Marbh	Short film
2003	Intermission	Student #2	
2003	A Ferret Called Mickey	Breda	Short film
2006	The Tiger's Tail	Sally	
2006	Mother's Little Helper	Muriel	Short film
2009	Savage	Dr.Cusack	
2010	The Alarms: A Story in Words	Georgina	
2011	The Other Side of Sleep	Selina	
2013	Philomena	Sister Claire	
2014	A Little Chaos	Louise	
2015	My Name is Emily	Greasy Haired Teacher	
2020	The Silver Skates	Miss Jackson	
2020	Herself	Jo	
2021	Omerta 6/12	Marie LeClair	Also known as Attack on Finland
2022	Nocebo	Liz	

=== Television ===
Year	Title	Role	Notes
1993	Screen Two	Desk Nurse	
1999	Glenroe	Lucy Reilly	
2000	Paths to Freedom	Miss Hayes	
2000	Trí Scéal	Sinéad Ward	
2003	Bachelor's Walk	Lauren	
2004	Proof	Kay Corcoran	
2009	The Clinic	Terry McGowan	
2009-15	ROY	Maura O'Brien	Series regular
2010	Single-Handed	Áine O'Sullivan	Series regular
2012	The Mario Rosenstock Show	Mary Nolan	
2012	Immaturity for Charity	Various	
2013	1,000 Times Good Night	Mother #1	
2013	Doctors	Samantha Kirby	Episode: "The Third Girl"
2014	Scúp	Rebecca	
2015–2020	Red Rock	Patricia Hennessy	Series regular
2017	Nowhere Fast	Caroline	
2017	On the Hemline	Sheenagh	TV movie
2018	The Delinquent Season	Martina	
2018	The Woman in White	Mrs. Hartright	TV mini-series
2019	Delicious	Keira	
2020-2023	Miss Scarlet and The Duke	Ivy	Series regular
2021-2023	Hidden Assets	Norah Dillon	Series regular
2023	The Catch	Claire Collier	Main role - All 4 episodes
2023	Clean Sweep	DCI Crichett (London)	
2024–present	The Hardacres	Emma Fitzherbert	

=== Radio ===
Title	Year	Notes
Hunger Again	2005	
Mind's Eye	2008	
