= Valerie O'Connor =

Irish actress and singer

- Born: c. 1981–82; Dublin, Ireland
- Occupation: Actor
- Height: 5 ft 5 in (1.65 m)
- Spouse: Peter Campion
- Children: 2

Valerie O'Connor is an Irish television actress, theatre actress, and singer. She is best known for playing Det. Insp. Nikki Grogan in soap-opera Red Rock and Miss Jervis in ROY.

== Personal life ==
O'Connor lives in Dublin city centre, but occasionally lives at a house in Wicklow at the weekends. O'Connor is an ambassador for Cystic Fibrosis Ireland and for their 'One in 1,000 Campaign'.

O'Connor revealed in August 2016 that she was nine months pregnant, and announced that she gave birth to a baby girl on 15 September 2016.

== Filmography ==
=== Film ===
Year	Title	Role	Notes
2008	City of Ember	Person in Line	
2008	The Daisy Chain	Jenny Gahan	
2010	Round Ireland with a Fridge	Roisin	
2014	Davin	Alyssa	
2015	Cherry Tree	Claire	
2019	Extra Ordinary	Angela	
2020	Nowhere Special	Ella	
2024	The Apprentice	Rona Barrett	

=== Television ===
Year	Title	Role	Notes
2007	The Tudors	Lady Unkindness	Episode: "Wolsey, Wolsey, Wolsey!"
2007	The English Class	Tracey	6 episodes
2010	Jack Taylor	Nuala Donnelly	Episode: "The Priest"
2011	Love/Hate	Miss Byrne	Episode #2.1
2014	My Whole Half Life	Mirella	Episode: "Between Heaven and Here"
2014–2015	Roy	Miss Jane Jervis	11 episodes
2015–2017	Red Rock	Insp Nikki Grogan	102 episodes
2018	Can't Cope, Won't Cope	Dee	2 episodes
2024	Sanctuary: A Witch's Tale	Bridget Paterson	7 episodes

== Theatre ==
Show	Role
The Threepenny Opera	Dolly
Jezebel	Jezebel
Durang Durang	—
Plaza Suite	Jean
Serious Money	Scilla Todd
Richard III	Lady Ann
