= JAM Media =

Animation studio based in Dublin, Ireland

Jam Media Limited
- Industry: Animation
- Founded: 2002
- Founders: John Rice; Alan Shannon; Mark Cumberton
- Divisions: JAM Media Dublin; JAM Media Belfast
- Website: www.jammedia.com

JAM Media is an Irish animation studio based in Dublin, Ireland with production facilities in Belfast. They are best known for creating the children's television series Roy (TV series) for CBBC, and Becca's Bunch for Nick Jr.

== History ==
Jam was founded in 2002 by animator friends Mark Cumberton, John Rice and Alan Shannon in Dublin.

In 2013 they opened a second studio in Belfast, Northern Ireland to help produce their own shows. In 2024 the Belfast studio also became the base of their services division, offering animation services to third parties.

== Productions ==
=== Animated Series ===
Show	Year(s)	Co-production with	Network(s)	Notes
Pic Me	2005-12		RTÉ News	104 episodes x 5mins
Funky Fables	2008-09	Boulder Media	CBBC	26 episodes x 11mins
Roy (TV series)	2009-15		CBBC, RTÉ, ABC3	4 Seasons, 52 episodes x 28mins, BAFTA Award winning series
Baby Jake	2011	Darrall Macqueen	Cbeebies	52 episodes x 11mins
Tilly and Friends	2012	Walker Books	Cbeebies	52 episodes x 11mins
The Roy Files	2015		RTÉ, CBBC, ABC Me	15 episodes x 15mins,
Zig and Zag (TV series)	2016	Double Z Enterprises, Flickerpix	CBBC, RTÉjr	26 episodes x 11mins, 22 shorts x 4mins
Little Roy (TV series)	2016		CBBC, CBeebies, RTÉ	52 episodes x 11mins
Becca's Bunch	2018		Nick Jr	52 episodes x 11mins
Jessy and Nessy	2020		Amazon Prime	40 episodes x 11mins
Nova Jones	2021		CBBC	30 episodes x 24mins

=== Feature Film ===
Film name	Year	Co-production with	Notes
A Greyhound of a Girl	2023	Fabrique d'images	An animated adaption of the book written by Roddy Doyle

=== Short films ===
Short Film Name	Year	Co-production with	Notes
Badly Drawn Roy	2006		
The Wiremen	2018		Winner of the James Horgan Award for Best Animation at the Galway Film Fleadh 2018
Featherweight	2019		
The Voyage			
Candlelight			
Worry World	2024		Winner of the James Horgan Award for Best Animation at the Galway Film Fleadh 2024
