= IFTA Award for Best Lead Actress – Film =

Irish film industry award

IFTA Award for Lead Actress – Film
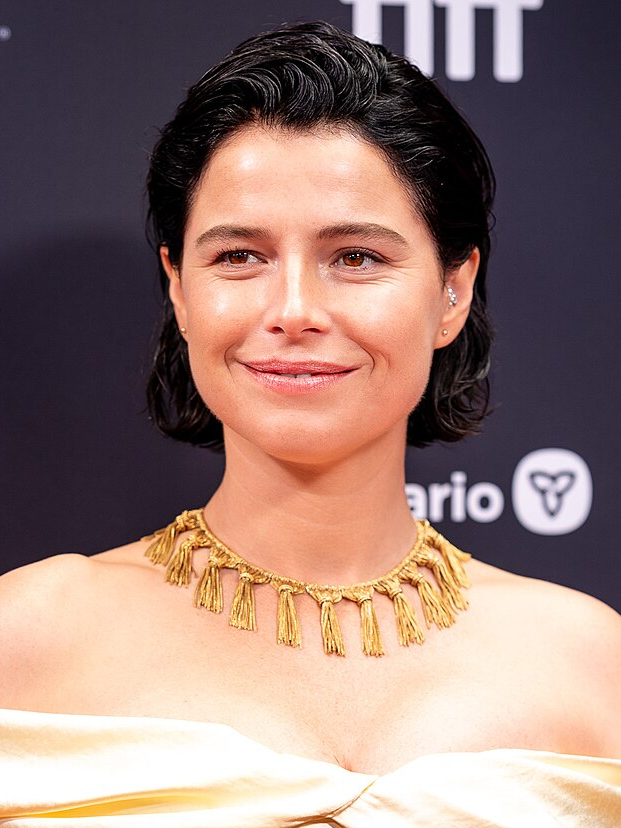
- The 2025 recipient: Jessie Buckley
- Awarded for: Best Performance by an Actress in a Leading Role
- Country: Ireland
- Presented by: Irish Film & Television Academy (IFTA)
- First award: 2003
- Most recent winner: Jessie Buckley, Hamnet (2026)
- Website: ifta.ie

The IFTA Award for Lead Actress – Film is an award presented annually by the Irish Film & Television Academy (IFTA). It has been presented since the 1st Irish Film & Television Awards ceremony in 2003 to an Irish actress who has delivered an outstanding performance in a leading role in a feature film.

The record for most wins is six, held by Saoirse Ronan, while Eva Birthistle and Jessie Buckley have both won the award twice. Ronan also holds the record for most nominations with nine. Seána Kerslake has the most nominations without winning, with four. Buckley is the award's most recent winner, winning her second award for her performance in Hamnet (2025).

== Eligibility ==
The award is exclusively open to Irish actresses; there is a separate International award for non-Irish actresses. The rules define an Irish person as follows:

- Born in Ireland (32 counties) or
- Have Irish Citizenship or
- Be full-time resident in Ireland (minimum of 3 years)

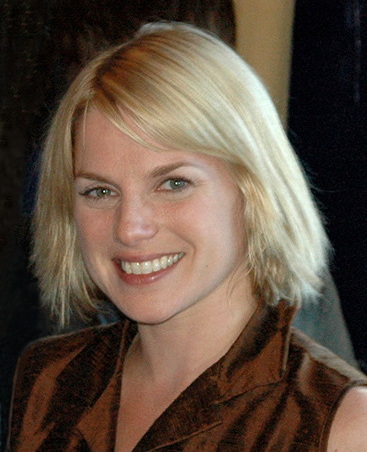
Eva Birthistle won twice, for Ae Fond Kiss (2004) and Middletown (2006).

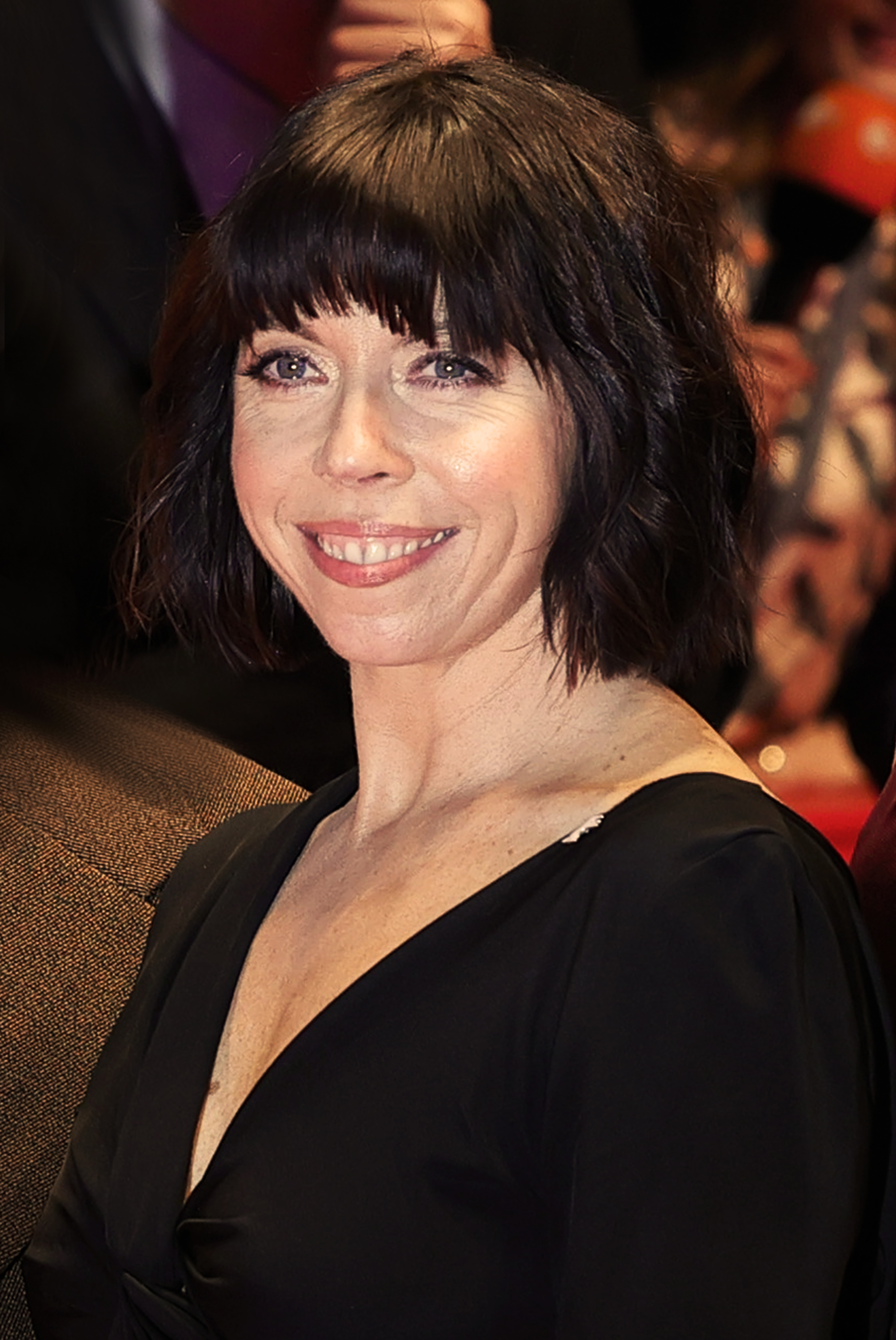
Eileen Walsh won for Eden (2008).

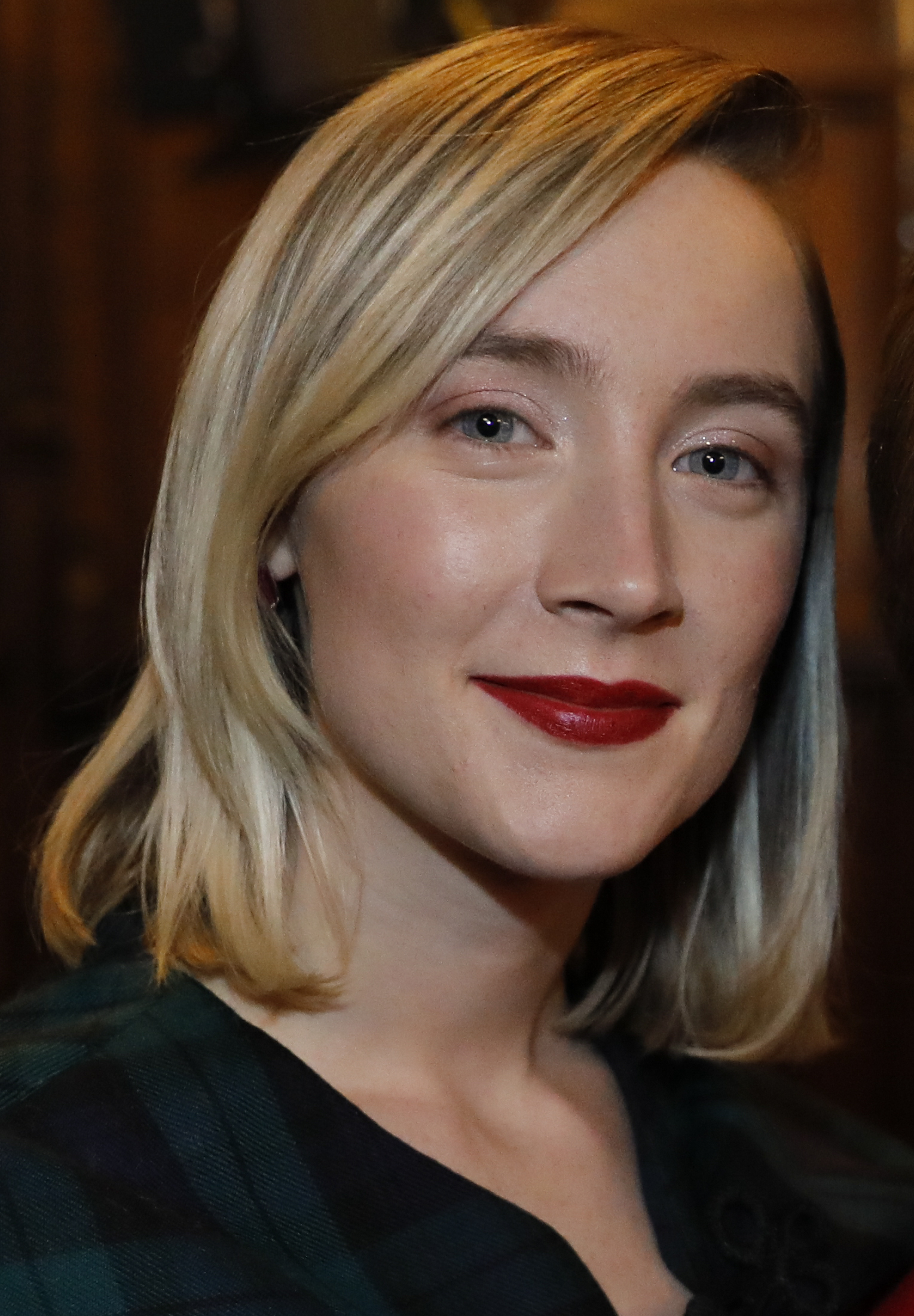
Saoirse Ronan won six times, for The Lovely Bones (2009), Hanna (2011), Byzantium (2012), Brooklyn (2015), Lady Bird (2017), and The Outrun (2024).

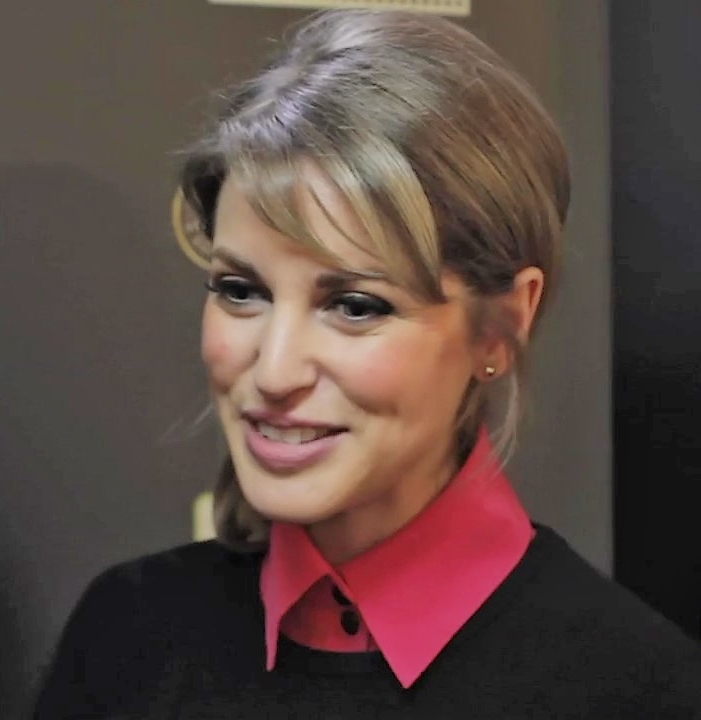
Amy Huberman won for Rewind (2010).

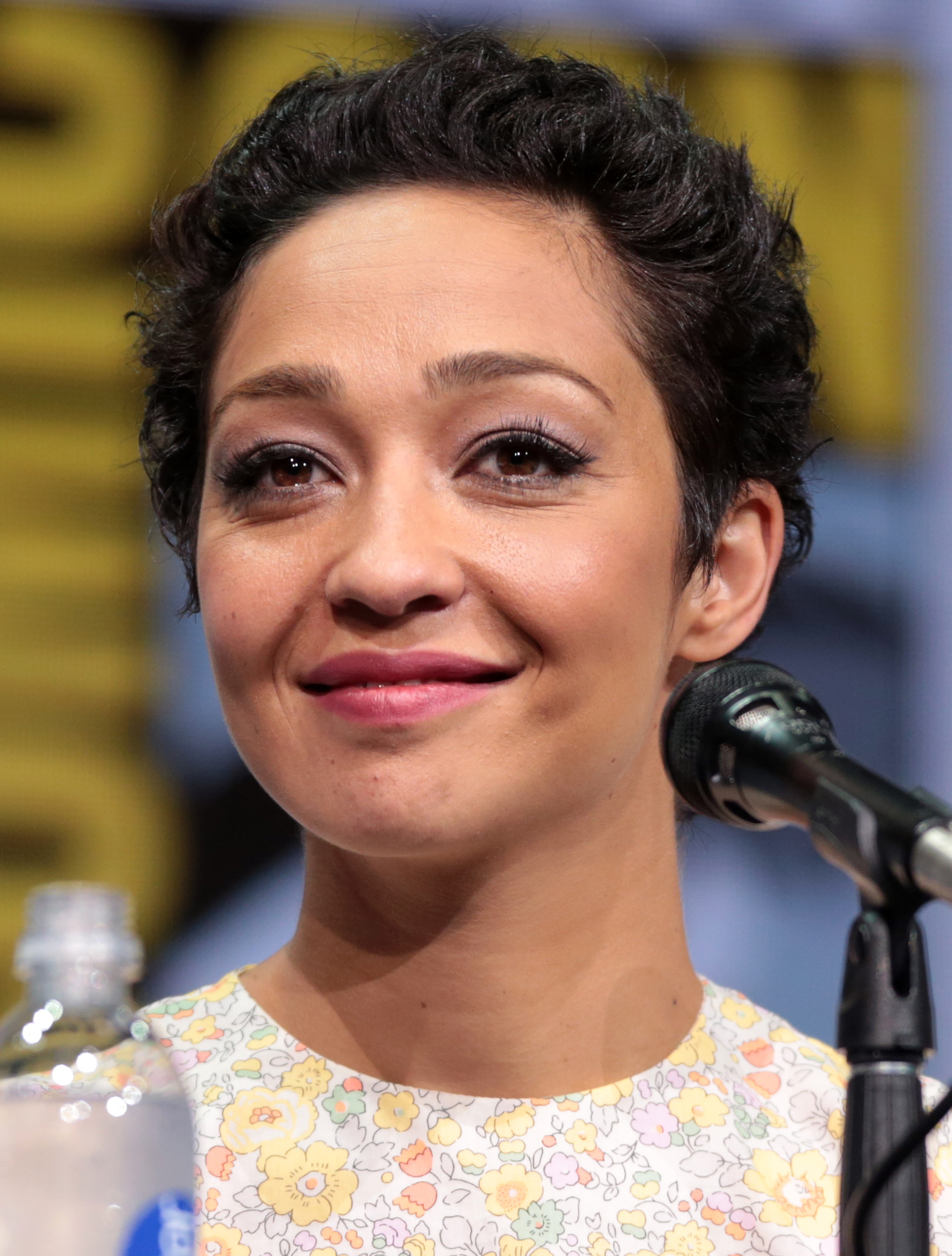
Ruth Negga won for Loving (2016).

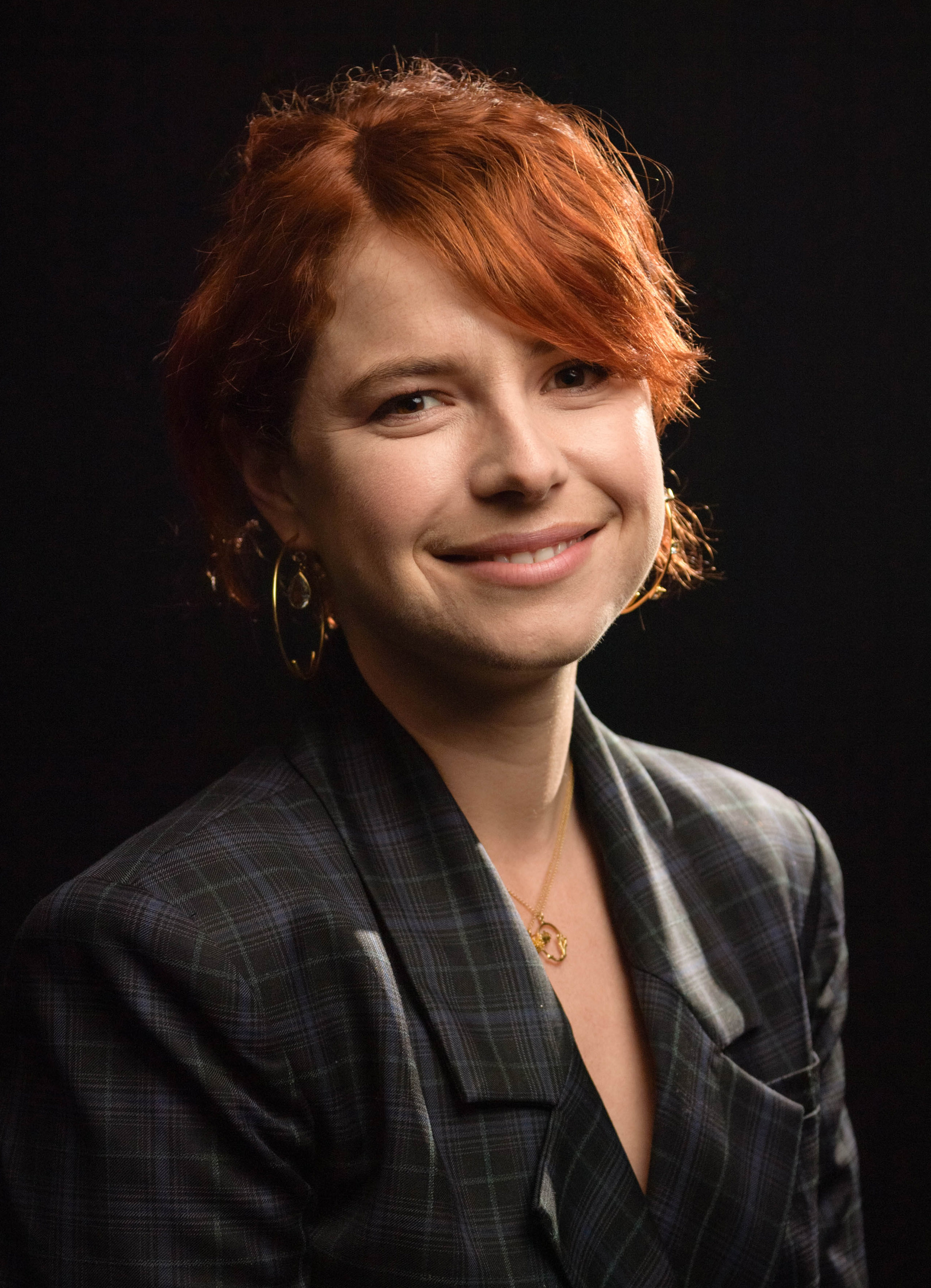
Jessie Buckley won twice for Wild Rose (2018) and Hamnet (2025).

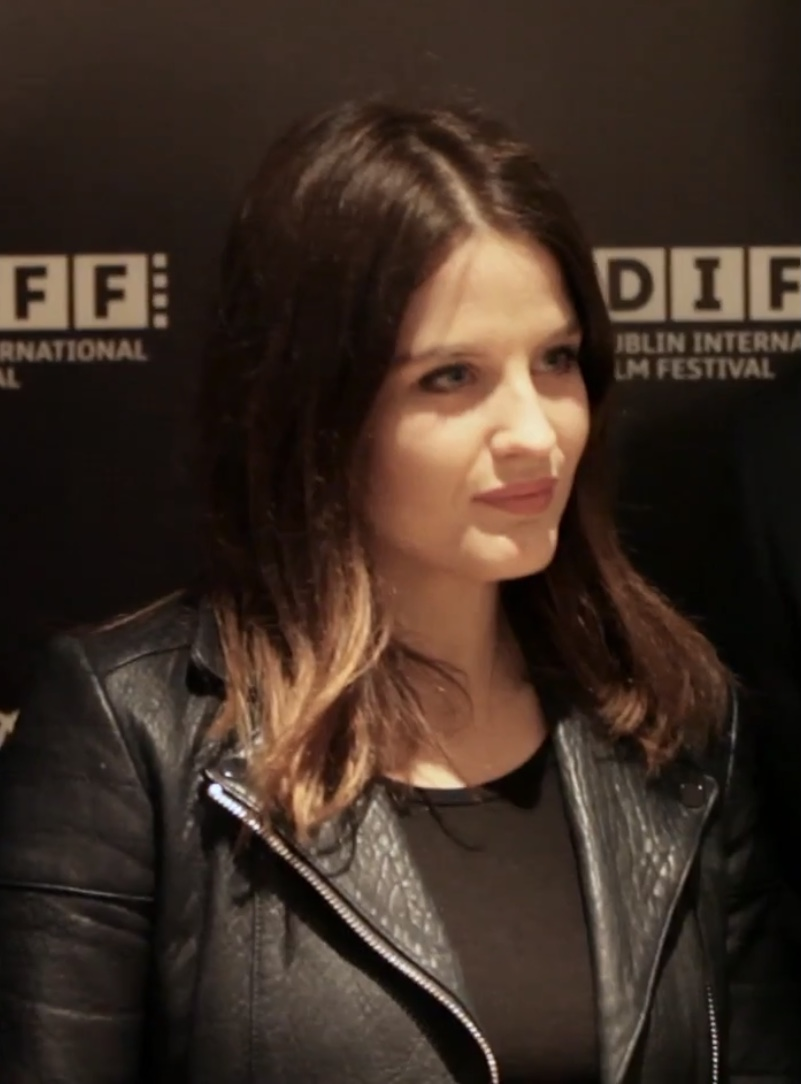
Nika McGuigan won posthumously for Wildfire (2020).

== Winners and nominees ==
In the following table, the years are listed as the year of film. The first three ceremonies were held at the end of the year, but since the 4th Irish Film & Television Awards the ceremonies have generally been held the following year. As there was no ceremony in 2019, the 16th Irish Film & Television Awards covered a period of two years.

Table key
‡	Indicates the winner
†	Indicates a posthumous winner

=== 2000s ===
Year	Actress	Film	Ref.
2003 (1st)	Angeline Ball ‡	Bloom	
2003 (1st)	Bronagh Gallagher	Spin the Bottle	
2003 (1st)	Maria Doyle Kennedy	Mystics	
2003 (1st)	Flora Montgomery	Goldfish Memory	
2003 (1st)	Natascha McElhone	Solaris	
2004 (2nd)	Eva Birthistle ‡	Ae Fond Kiss	
2004 (2nd)	Eva Birthistle	Timbuktu	
2004 (2nd)	Michèle Forbes	Omagh	
2004 (2nd)	Brenda Fricker	Inside I'm Dancing	
2004 (2nd)	Louise Lewis	Adam & Paul	
2005 (3rd)	Renée Weldon ‡	Trouble with Sex	
2005 (3rd)	Andrea Corr	The Boys & Girl from County Clare	
2005 (3rd)	Jillian Bradbury	Winter's End	
2005 (3rd)	Winnie Maughan	Pavee Lackeen	
2006 (4th)	Eva Birthistle ‡	Middletown	
2006 (4th)	Gemma Doorly	A Song for Rebecca	
2006 (4th)	Pauline McLynn	Gypo	
2006 (4th)	Ruth Negga	Isolation	
2007 (Note: The Lead Actress Film and TV awards were combined this year. Ní Neachtain was the only nominee from a film, and she did not win the award.) (5th)	Bríd Ní Neachtain	Cré na Cille	
2008 (6th)	Eileen Walsh ‡	Eden	
2008 (6th)	Jenn Murray	Dorothy	
2008 (6th)	Kelly O'Neill	Kisses	
2008 (6th)	Saoirse Ronan	City of Ember	
2009 (7th)	Saoirse Ronan ‡	The Lovely Bones	
2009 (7th)	Janice Byrne	Zonad	
2009 (7th)	Amy Kirwan	Eamon	
2009 (7th)	Jae Yourell	Happy Ever Afters	

=== 2010s ===
Year	Actress	Film	Ref.
2010 (Note: The Lead Actress Film and TV awards were combined this year as IFTA had “not received sufficient submissions” to have separate awards. Huberman was the only nominee from a film, and went on to win the award.) (8th)	Amy Huberman ‡	Rewind	
2011 (9th)	Saoirse Ronan ‡	Hanna	
2011 (9th)	Aoife Duffin	Behold the Lamb	
2011 (9th)	Antonia Campbell-Hughes	The Other Side of Sleep	
2011 (9th)	Marcella Plunkett	Stella Days	
2012 (10th)	Ruth Bradley ‡	Grabbers	
2012 (10th)	Anne-Marie Duff	Sanctuary	
2012 (10th)	Seána Kerslake	Dollhouse	
2012 (10th)	Róisín Murphy	What Richard Did	
2013 (11th)	Saoirse Ronan ‡	Byzantium	
2013 (11th)	Antonia Campbell-Hughes	3096 Days	
2013 (11th)	Jane McGrath	Black Ice	
2013 (11th)	Kelly Thornton	Life's a Breeze	
2014 (12th)	Deirdre O'Kane ‡	Noble	
2014 (12th)	Tara Breathnach	A Nightingale Falling	
2014 (12th)	Jordanne Jones	I Used to Live Here	
2014 (12th)	Simone Kirby	Jimmy's Hall	
2015 (13th)	Saoirse Ronan ‡	Brooklyn	
2015 (13th)	Eva Birthistle	Swansong	
2015 (13th)	Ruth Bradley	Pursuit	
2015 (13th)	Orla Brady	The Price of Desire	
2015 (13th)	Evanna Lynch	My Name Is Emily	
2016 (14th)	Ruth Negga ‡	Loving	
2016 (14th)	Caoilfhionn Dunne	In View	
2016 (14th)	Seána Kerslake	A Date for Mad Mary	
2016 (14th)	Aisling Loftus	Property of the State	
2016 (14th)	Catherine Walker	A Dark Song	
2017 (15th)	Saoirse Ronan ‡	Lady Bird	
2017 (15th)	Sarah Bolger	Halal Daddy	
2017 (15th)	Ann Skelly	Kissing Candice	
2018/19 (16th)	Jessie Buckley ‡	Wild Rose	
2018/19 (16th)	Aisling Franciosi	The Nightingale	
2018/19 (16th)	Bronagh Gallagher	A Bump Along the Way	
2018/19 (16th)	Sarah Greene	Rosie	
2018/19 (16th)	Seána Kerslake	The Hole in the Ground	
2018/19 (16th)	Saoirse Ronan	Little Women	

=== 2020s ===
Year	Actress	Film	Ref.
2020/21 (17th)	Nika McGuigan †	Wildfire	
2020/21 (17th)	Jessie Buckley	I'm Thinking of Ending Things	
2020/21 (17th)	Clare Dunne	Herself	
2020/21 (17th)	Lola Petticrew	Dating Amber	
2020/21 (17th)	Nora-Jane Noone	Wildfire	
2021/22 (18th)	Catherine Clinch ‡	An Cailín Ciúin	
2021/22 (18th)	Niamh Algar	Censor	
2021/22 (18th)	Angeline Ball	Deadly Cuts	
2021/22 (18th)	Gemma-Leah Devereux	The Bright Side	
2021/22 (18th)	Hazel Doupe	You Are Not My Mother	
2022/23 (19th)	Bríd Ní Neachtain ‡	Róise & Frank	
2022/23 (19th)	Zara Devlin	Ann	
2022/23 (19th)	Danielle Galligan	Lakelands	
2022/23 (19th)	Kelly Gough	Tarrac	
2022/23 (19th)	Seána Kerslake	Ballywalter	
2022/23 (19th)	Alisha Weir	Roald Dahl's Matilda the Musical	
2023 (20th)	Agnes O'Casey ‡	Lies We Tell	
2023 (20th)	Jessie Buckley	Fingernails	
2023 (20th)	Eve Hewson	Flora and Son	
2023 (20th)	Saoirse Ronan	Foe	
2023 (20th)	Bríd Brennan	My Sailor, My Love	
2023 (20th)	Geraldine McAlinden	Verdigris	
2024 (21st)	Saoirse Ronan ‡	The Outrun	
2024 (21st)	Carolyn Bracken	Oddity	
2024 (21st)	Jessie Buckley	Wicked Little Letters	
2024 (21st)	Hazel Doupe	Kathleen Is Here	
2024 (21st)	Eileen Walsh	Small Things Like These	
2024 (21st)	Alisha Weir	Abigail	
2025 (22nd)	Jessie Buckley ‡	Hamnet	
2025 (22nd)	Carolyn Bracken	Horseshoe	
2025 (22nd)	Carrie Crowley	Aontas	
2025 (22nd)	Fionnula Flanagan	Four Mothers	
2025 (22nd)	Eleanor O'Brien	Báite	
2025 (22nd)	Fiona Shaw	Hot Milk	

== Multiple awards and nominations ==
The following individuals have received two or more Lead Actress awards:

Wins	Actress	Nominations
6	Saoirse Ronan	9
2	Jessie Buckley	5
2	Eva Birthistle	4

The following individuals have received two or more Lead Actress nominations:

Nominations	Actress
9	Saoirse Ronan
5	Jessie Buckley
4	Eva Birthistle
4	Seána Kerslake
2	Angeline Ball
2	Carolyn Bracken
2	Ruth Bradley
2	Antonia Campbell-Hughes
2	Hazel Doupe
2	Bronagh Gallagher
2	Bríd Ní Neachtain
2	Ruth Negga
2	Eileen Walsh
2	Alisha Weir
