= 22nd Irish Film & Television Awards =

2026 film and television awards

22nd IFTA Film & Drama Awards
- Date: 20 February 2026
- Site: Dublin Royal Convention Centre
- Hosted by: Kevin McGahern

Highlights
- Best Film: Christy
- Best Direction: Brendan Canty; Christy
- Best Actor: Éanna Hardwicke; Saipan
- Best Actress: Jessie Buckley; Hamnet
- Most awards: Film: Christy / Hamnet (4); Television: Trespasses (3)
- Most nominations: Film: Christy (14); Television: Video Nasty (7)

Television coverage
- Channel: RTÉ One / RTÉ Player

The 22nd Irish Film & Television Academy Awards, also called the 23rd Anniversary IFTA Awards, took place on 20 February 2026. The ceremony was held at the Dublin Royal Convention Centre for the third consecutive year, hosted by Kevin McGahern for the second consecutive year. It honoured Irish films and television drama released between 1 January 2025 and 31 December 2025.

The nominations were announced on 20 January 2026. For the film categories, the Brendan Canty drama Christy led the nominations with fourteen, followed by sports drama Saipan with twelve. On the television side, BBC Northern Ireland comedy horror series Video Nasty received the most nominations with seven, followed by RTÉ One crime drama Hidden Assets with six.

Nominees for the Rising Star Award were announced on 9 February 2026. Irish actor Ciarán Hinds was honoured with the Lifetime Achievement Award, in recognition of his "outstanding Irish and international acting achievements, and contribution to the screen industry across fifty years".

In regards to the nominations, Academy CEO Áine Moriarty said: "What a superb lineup of nominees this year shortlisted for Irish Academy Awards. This incredible showcase of work reinforces the fact that Irish talent is truly amongst the best in the world, working both in front and behind the camera across the globe. We look forward to rewarding their work and achievements at the ceremony on February 20th."

Highlights from the ceremony were broadcast on RTÉ One and RTÉ Player on 21 February 2026.

== Winners and nominees ==
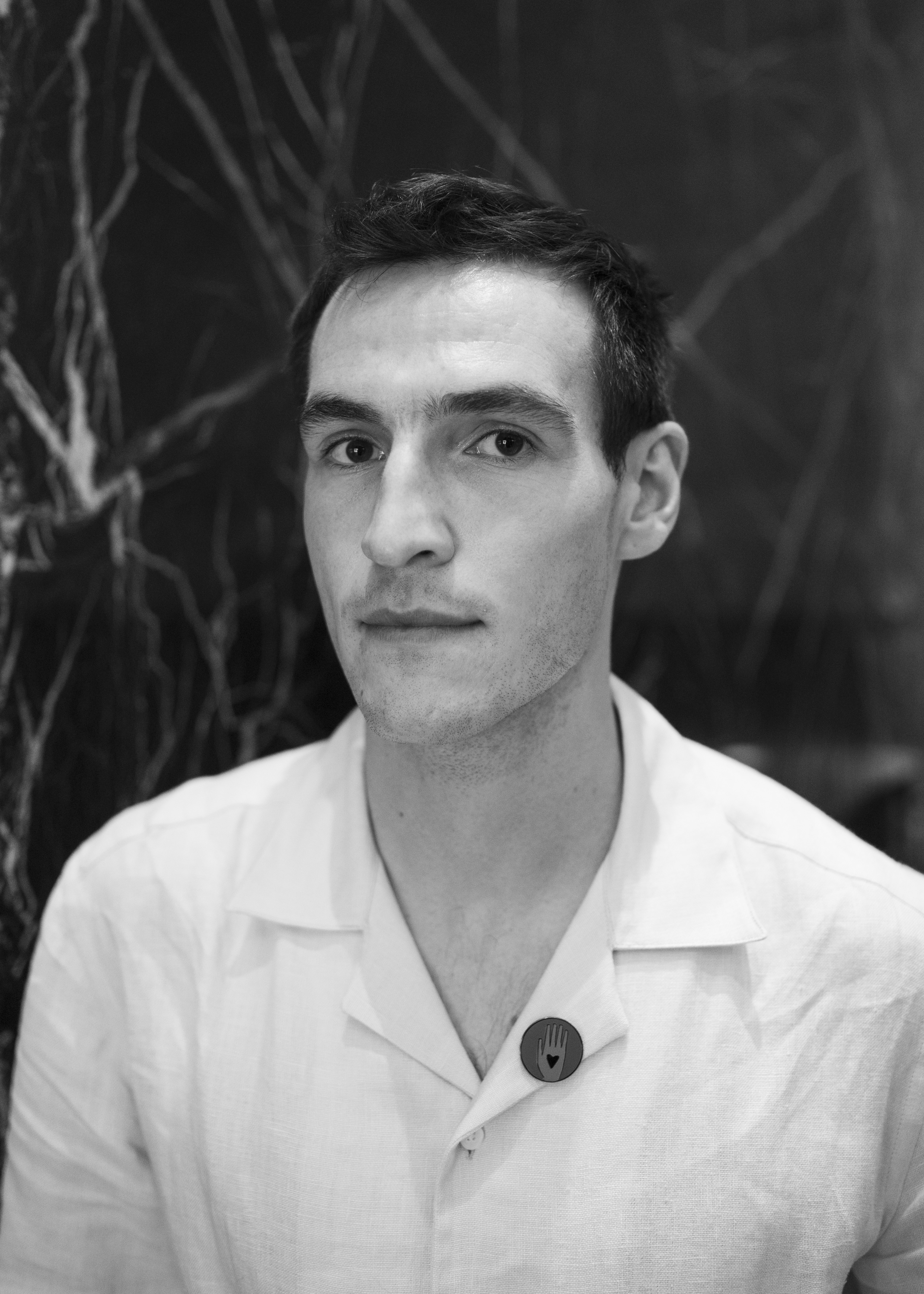
Éanna Hardwicke, Best Lead Actor winner

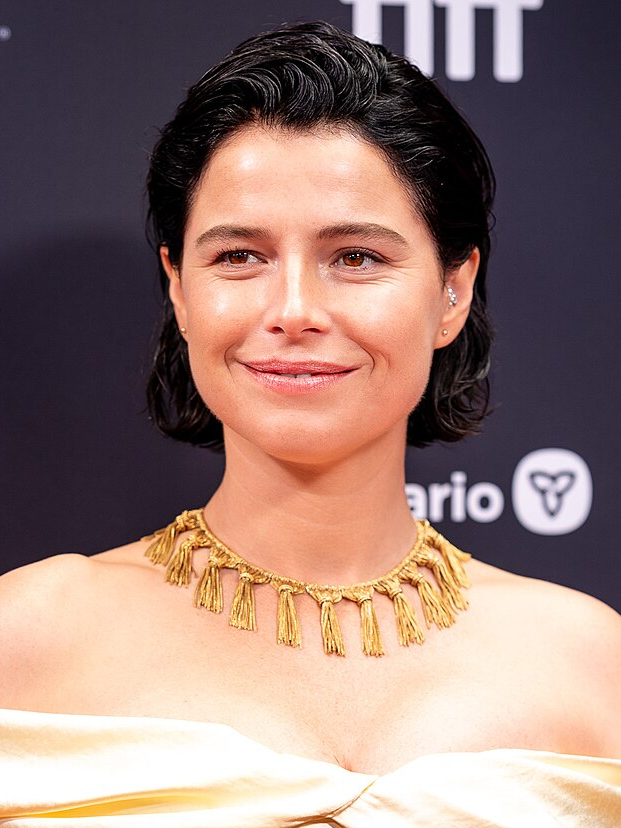
Jessie Buckley, Best Lead Actress winner

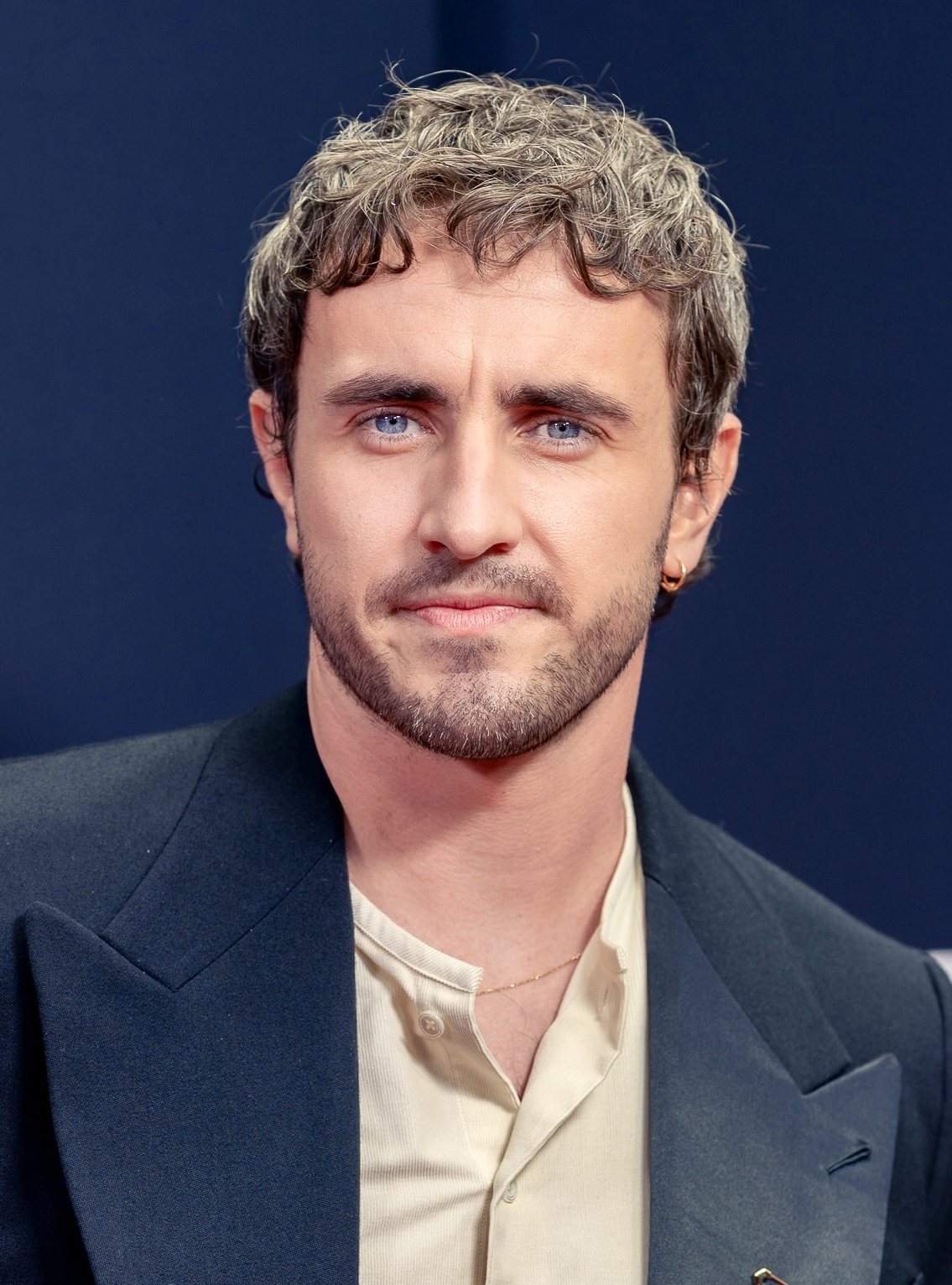
Paul Mescal, Best Supporting Actor winner

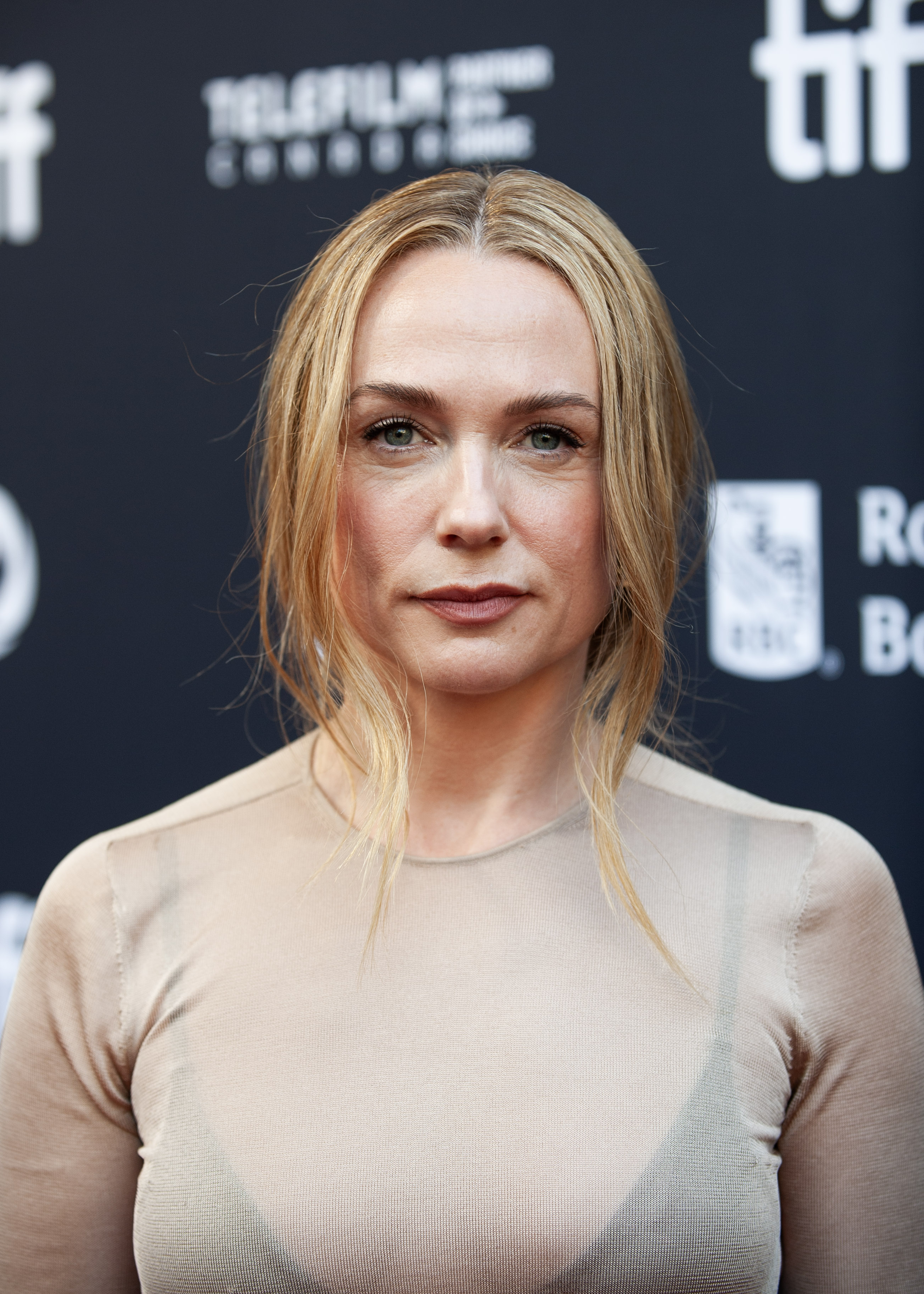
Kerry Condon, Best Supporting Actress winner

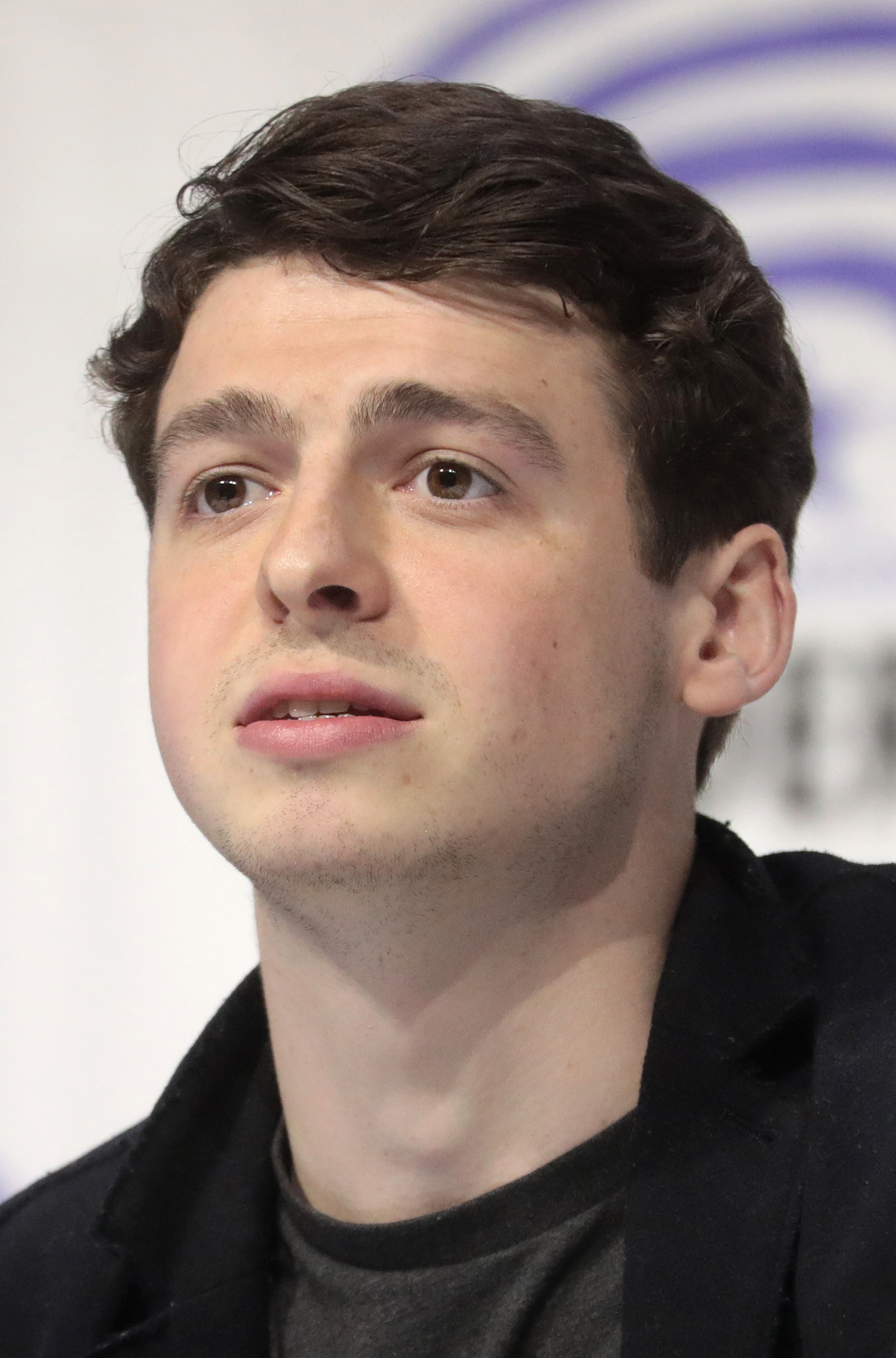
Anthony Boyle, Best Lead Actor in Television winner

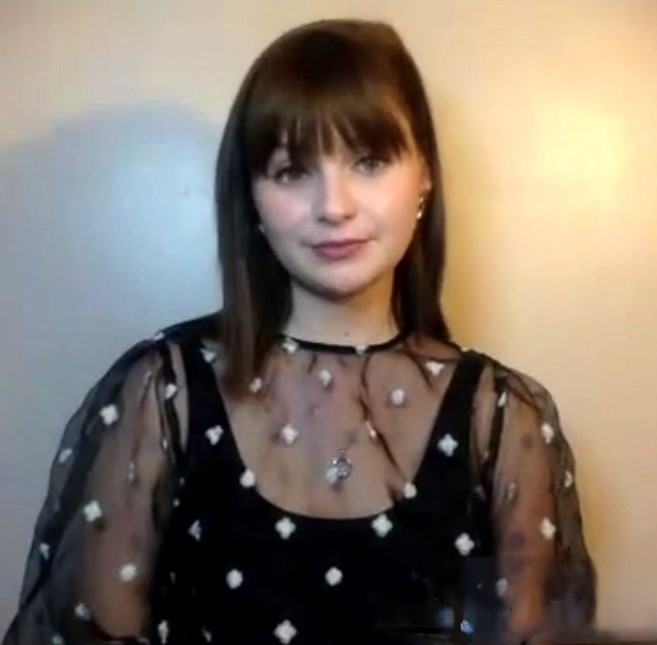
Lola Petticrew, Best Lead Actress in Television winner

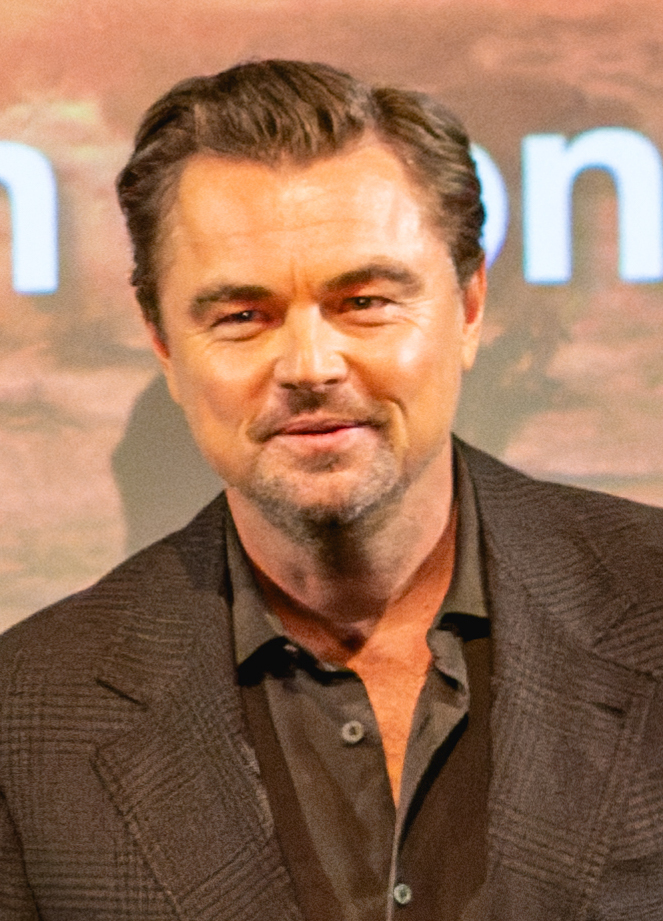
Leonardo DiCaprio, Best International Actor winner

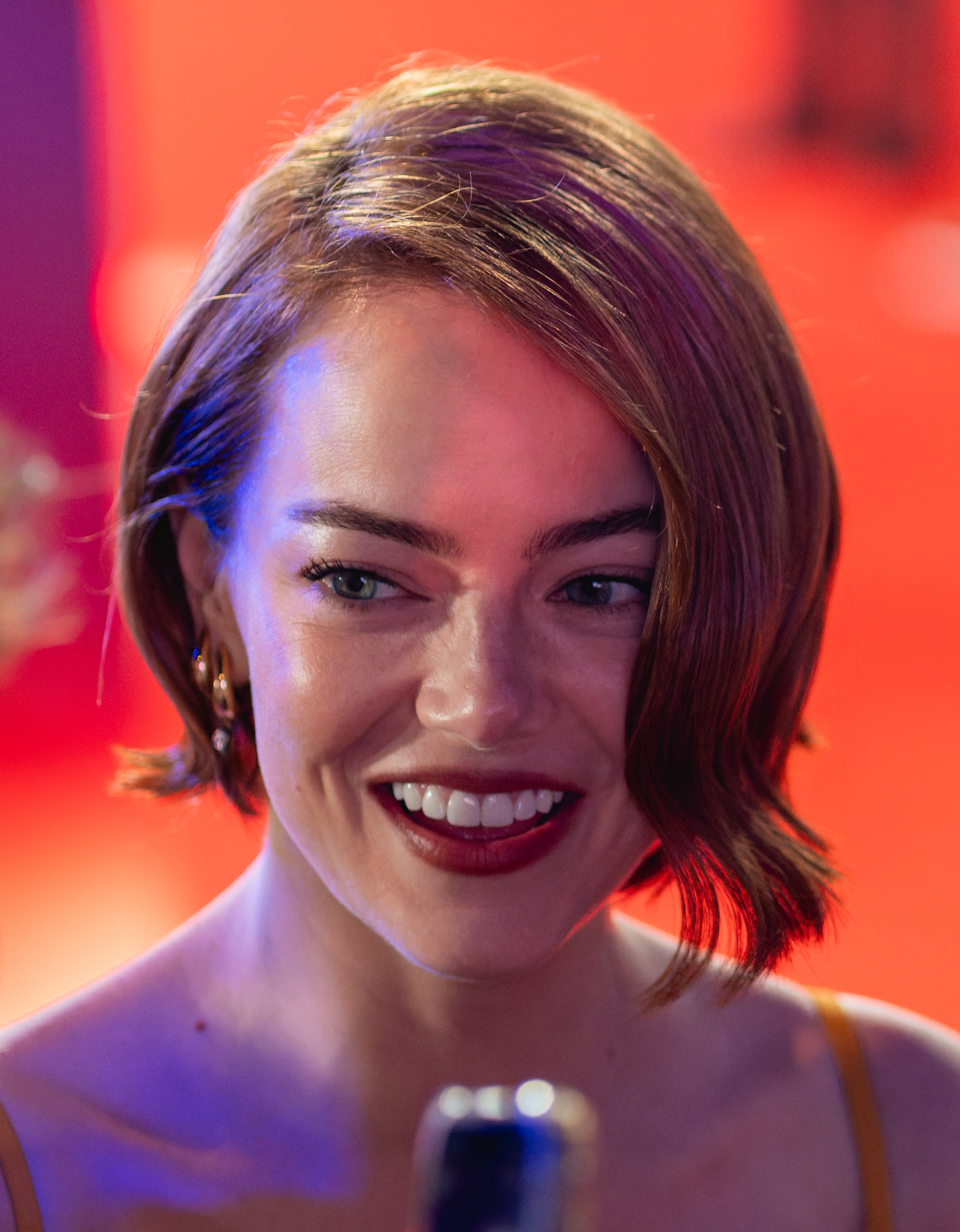
Emma Stone, Best International Actress winner

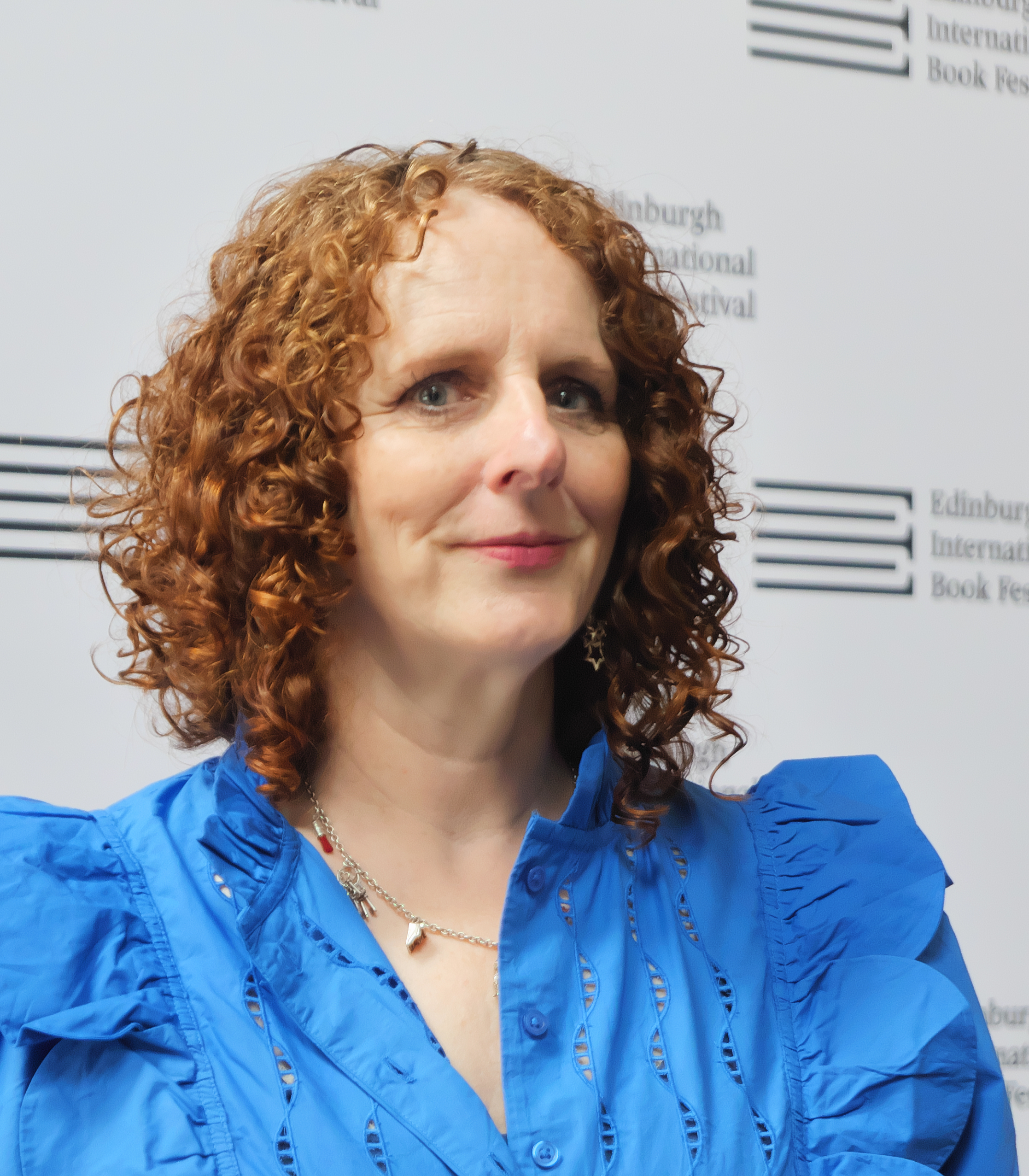
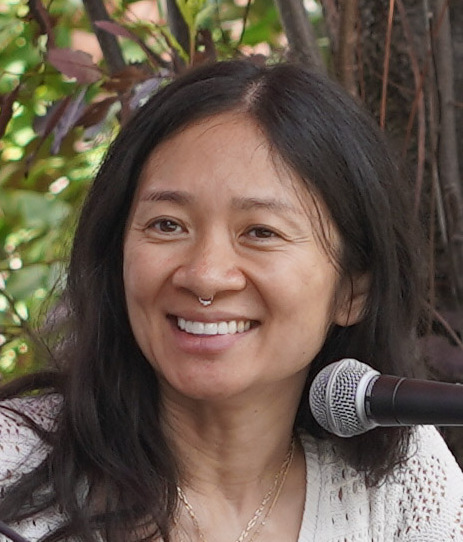
Maggie O'Farrell and Chloé Zhao, Best Script – Film winners

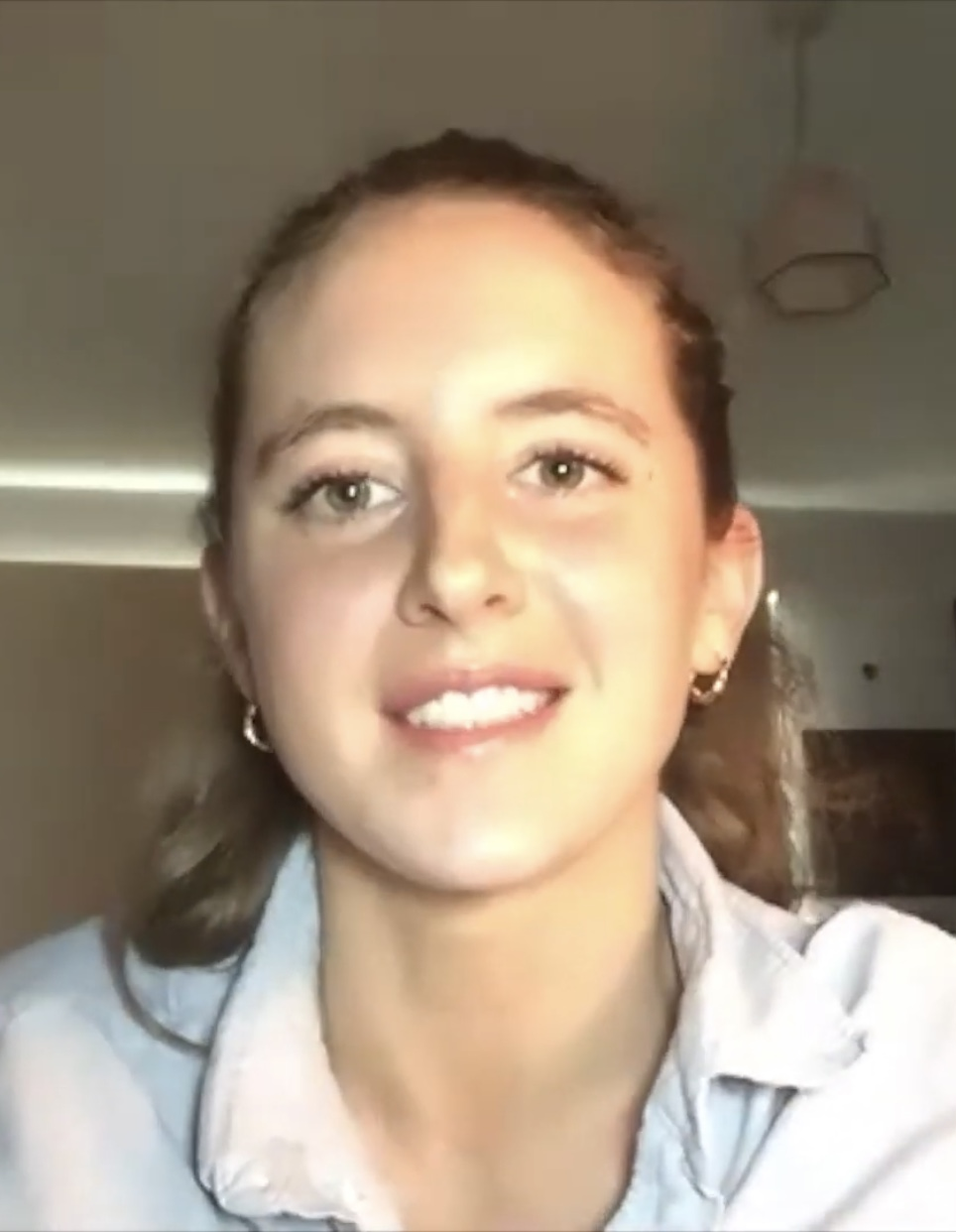
Louisa Harland, Rising Star Award recipient

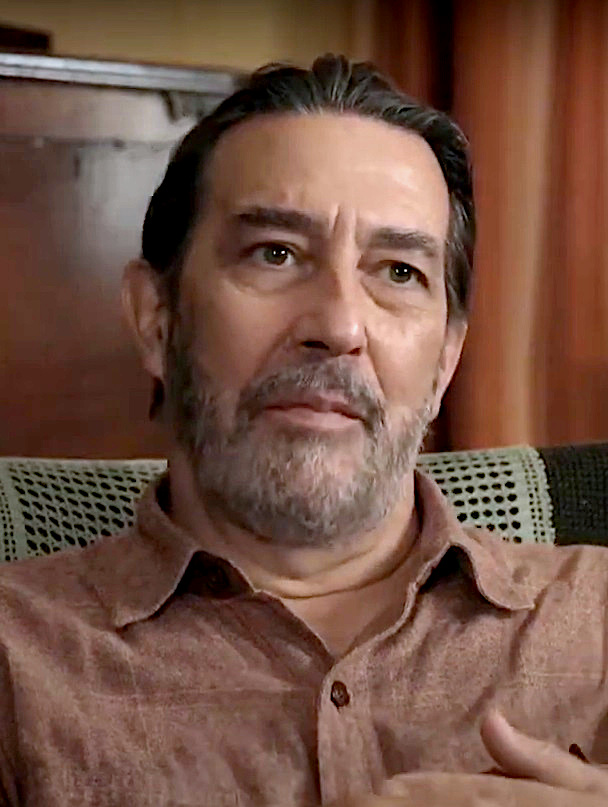
Ciarán Hinds, Lifetime Achievement Award recipient

=== Film ===
Best Film	Best Director
Christy; Aontas; Blue Moon; Four Mothers; Saipan; Steve	Brendan Canty – Christy; Lisa Barros D'Sa and Glenn Leyburn – Saipan; Myrid Carten – A Want in Her; Lorcan Finnegan – The Surfer; Ruán Magan – Báite; Edwin Mullane and Adam O'Keeffe – Horseshoe
Best Lead Actor	Best Lead Actress
Éanna Hardwicke – Saipan as Roy Keane; Steve Coogan – Saipan as Mick McCarthy; Daniel Day-Lewis – Anemone as Ray Stoker; Colin Farrell – Ballad of a Small Player as Brendan Reilly / Lord Doyle; Cillian Murphy – Steve as Steve; Daniel Power – Christy as Christy	Jessie Buckley – Hamnet as Agnes Shakespeare; Carolyn Bracken – Horseshoe as Cass Canavan; Carrie Crowley – Aontas as Mairead; Fionnula Flanagan – Four Mothers as Alma; Eleanor O'Brien – Báite as Peggy Casey; Fiona Shaw – Hot Milk as Rose
Best Supporting Actor	Best Supporting Actress
Paul Mescal – Hamnet as William Shakespeare; Liam Cunningham – Palestine 36 as Charles Tegart; Jamie Forde – Christy as Robot; Diarmuid Noyes – Christy as Shane; Seán T. Ó Meallaigh – Aontas as Colly; Andrew Scott – Blue Moon as Richard Rodgers	Kerry Condon – F1 as Kate McKenna; Bríd Brennan – Aontas as Cáit; Kerry Condon – Train Dreams as Claire Thompson; Sarah Greene – Trad as Mother; Dearbhla Molloy – Four Mothers as Jean; Emma Willis – Christy as Stacey
Best Script	George Morrison Award for Best Feature Documentary
Maggie O'Farrell and Chloé Zhao – Hamnet; Sarah Gordon and Damian McCann – Aontas; Sheena Lambert – Báite; Alan O'Gorman – Christy; Colin Thornton and Darren Thornton – Four Mothers; Enda Walsh – Die My Love	A Want in Her; The Essence of Eva; Listen to the Land Speak; Sanatorium; Testimony; Útoipe Cheilteach
Best Short Film	Best Animated Short
Nostalgie; The Ban; No Mean City; No Time Wasters; Punt; Three Keenings	Retirement Plan; Éiru; Inside, The Valley Sings; Rerooted

=== Television ===
Best Drama	Best Director
Blue Lights; Leonard and Hungry Paul; Trespasses; The Walsh Sisters; Wednesday; The Young Offenders	Rachel Carey – Obituary; Megan K Fox – Video Nasty; Oonagh Kearney – The Au Pair; Mia Mullarkey – Hidden Assets; Hugh O'Conor – Showkids; Aisling Walsh – Miss Austen
Best Lead Actor	Best Lead Actress
Anthony Boyle – House of Guinness as Arthur Guinness; Pierce Brosnan – MobLand as Conrad Harrigan; Domhnall Gleeson – The Paper as Ned Sampson; Martin McCann – Blue Lights as Stevie Neill; Aaron Monaghan – Hidden Assets as Sean Prendergast; Alex Murphy – The Young Offenders as Conor MacSweeney	Lola Petticrew – Trespasses as Cushla Lavery; Niamh Algar – The Iris Affair as Iris Nixon; Caitríona Balfe – Outlander as Claire Fraser; Siobhán Cullen – Obituary as Elvira Clancy; Louisa Harland – The Walsh Sisters as Anna Walsh; Nora-Jane Noone – Hidden Assets as Claire Wallace
Best Supporting Actor	Best Supporting Actress
Chris Walley – The Young Offenders as Jock O'Keeffe; Jack Gleeson – House of Guinness as Byron Hedges; Cal O'Driscoll – Video Nasty as Con; Dónall Ó Héalai – Hidden Assets as Liam Boylan; Fionn O'Shea – House of Guinness as Benjamin Guinness; Aidan Quinn – The Walsh Sisters as Daddy Walsh	Alison Oliver – Task as Lizzie Stover; Cathy Belton – Hidden Assets as Norah Dillon; Ruth Bradley – Slow Horses as Emma Flyte; Katherine Devlin – Blue Lights as Annie Conlon; Danielle Galligan – House of Guinness as Lady Olivia Hedges; Genevieve O'Reilly – Andor as Mon Mothma
Best Script
Ailbhe Keogan – Trespasses; Peter Foott – The Young Offenders; Declan Lawn and Adam Patterson – Blue Lights; Cara Loftus – Hidden Assets; Stefanie Preissner – The Walsh Sisters; Hugh Travers – Video Nasty

=== International (Film) ===
Best International Film
Hamnet; Bugonia; One Battle After Another; Palestine 36; Sentimental Value; Sinners
Best International Actor	Best International Actress
Leonardo DiCaprio – One Battle After Another as Bob Ferguson; Ethan Hawke – Blue Moon as Lorenz Hart; Michael B. Jordan – Sinners as Elijah "Smoke" Moore / Elias "Stack" Moore; James McArdle – Four Mothers as Edward; Sean Penn – One Battle After Another as Col. Steven J. Lockjaw; Jesse Plemons – Bugonia as Teddy Gatz	Emma Stone – Bugonia as Michelle Fuller; Chase Infiniti – One Battle After Another as Willa Ferguson; Jennifer Lawrence – Die My Love as Grace; Margaret Qualley – Blue Moon as Elizabeth Weiland; Renate Reinsve – Sentimental Value as Nora Borg; Teyana Taylor – One Battle After Another as Perfidia Beverly Hills

=== Craft (Film & Television) ===
Best Casting	Best Cinematography
Christy – Amy Rowan; Four Mothers – Louise Kiely; The Rainmaker – Emma Gunnery; Ready or Not – Alison Crosbie and Maureen Hughes; Saipan – Aine O'Sullivan	Die My Love – Seamus McGarvey; Bugonia – Robbie Ryan; Christy – Colm Hogan; Saipan – Piers McGrail; Severance – Suzie Lavelle
Best Costume Design	Best Editing
Blue Moon – Consolata Boyle; Christy – Hannah Bury; Four Mothers – Joan O'Clery; Saipan – Lara Campbell; Video Nasty – Joanne O'Brien	Christy – Allyn Quigley; Blue Lights – Helen Sheridan; House of Guinness – Ben Yeates; Saipan – Gavin Buckley and John Murphy; The Surfer – Tony Cranstoun
Best Make-Up & Hair	Best Original Music
Trespasses – Natalie Reid; Blue Moon – Liz Byrne and Linda Gannon; Christy – Edwina Kelly and Jennie Readman; Saipan – Polly McKay; Wednesday – Lynn Johnston	Báite – Craig Stuart Garfinkle and Eímear Noone; Aontas – Daithí Ó Drónaí; Christy – Daithí Ó Drónaí; Saipan – David Holmes and Brian Irvine; Video Nasty – Die Hexen
Best Production Design	Best Sound
Wednesday – Neville Gaynor and Philip Murphy; Blue Moon – Susie Cullen and Kevin Downey; Christy – Martin Goulding; Saipan – John Leslie; Video Nasty – Tara O'Reilly	Anemone – Steve Fanagan; Blue Moon – Hugh Fox; Saipan – Andrew Graham, Tim Harrison, and Paul Maynes; The Surfer – Aza Hand; Video Nasty – Patrick Downey
Best VFX
House of Guinness – Eoin O'Sullivan and David Sewell; Anemone – Tom Fagan; Foundation – Andrew Barry and Ed Bruce; One Battle After Another – Amrei Bronnenmayer and Ed Bruce

== Special ==
=== Rising Star ===
- Louisa Harland (Actor – Derry Girls, The Walsh Sisters)
  - Carolyn Bracken (Actor – Horseshoe, Oddity)
  - Brendan Canty (Director – Christy, Gealtra)
  - Myrid Carten (Director – A Want in Her)

=== Irish Academy Award for Lifetime Achievement ===
- Ciarán Hinds (for his outstanding Irish and international Acting achievements, and contribution to the screen industry across fifty years)

== See also ==
- 2025 in Irish television
- 79th British Academy Film Awards
- 2026 British Academy Television Awards
