= Creepers (novel) =

2005 novel by David Morrell

- Author: David Morrell
- Language: English
- Genre: Horror
- Publisher: CDS Books
- Publication date: 2005
- Followed by: Scavenger

Creepers is a 2005 horror novel by Canadian writer David Morrell. This is Morrell's twenty-fourth novel. A sequel novel, Scavenger, was published in 2007.

The novel tied with Charlee Jacob's Dread in the Beast for the 2005 Bram Stoker Award for Best Novel.

== Summary ==
A reporter, Frank Balenger, and four urban explorers or "creepers", Rick, Cora, Vinnie and Conklin, have set out to explore the Paragon Hotel, a long-abandoned seaside luxury hotel whose hemophiliac owner, Morgan Carlisle, unexpectedly committed suicide at the nearby beach.

While they are exploring the hotel Conklin injures his leg and the group is attacked by three men, Mack, JD, and Tod, who throw Rick over the third story banister. They restrain the others and force them to accompany them in their search for a vault rumored to hold a massive amount of wealth. Unable to easily move, Conklin is left behind. The group finds the vault, but instead of riches they find a woman named Amanda, who tells them that she has been held captive by a man named Ronnie, who lives inside the hotel. They return to Conklin, who has been murdered by Ronnie. Afraid for their lives, the would-be thieves restrain the others so they could serve as bait for Ronnie. Balenger manages to free himself and the others. As they ready to leave they meet Tod, who informs them that Mack and JD were killed by one of Ronnie's traps. The survivors decide to try and flee through the roof, making it necessary to enter the owner's suite at the top of the hotel.

Once there, they find that Ronnie has made the suite his home and has been using the hotel's security system to monitor the group. Through this system, they watch in horror as Ronnie traps them in the suite, with the elevator serving as the only exit. The group also learns that Ronnie had been living in the hotel since he was a boy. He was taken in by Carlisle after Ronnie murdered his father, who had been molesting the child and prostituting him out to other pedophiles. Carlisle had discovered the death via a series of passages he had created inside the hotel to view his guests. He later closed the hotel and continued to raise Ronnie until he discovered that his adoptive son had become a serial killer, which eventually drove him to kill himself.

The elevator begins to rise, however when it opens they find a heavily wounded Rick, who dies in Cora's arms. As she weeps, Ronnie shoots and kills her from beneath the floor, revealing that there were also secret passageways under the floor. In the resulting chaos Vinnie becomes injured, making it difficult for them to flee. They successfully make it to the beach, only for Tod to die in the process. Balenger and Ronnie battle on the beach until Amanda clubs Ronnie over the head with a heavy piece of wood. Balenger, Amanda, and Vinnie return to the hotel, where they are met by the police, who had been alerted to a disturbance within the hotel.

== Release ==
Creepers was published in 2005 through CDS books, marking Morrell's first publication through the company.

== Film adaptation ==
In 2022 it was announced that Lionsgate and Suretone Pictures was funding a film adaptation of Creepers. Marc Klasfeld was picked to direct and filming was slated to begin in July of that same year. Actors attached to the film, titled Do Not Enter, included Adeline Rudolph, Nicholas Hamilton, Francesca Reale, Jake Manley, Kai Caster, Shane Paul McGhie, Brennan Keel Cook, Javier Botet, and Laurence O'Fuarain. The first trailer for the movie was released in August 2025.

== Reception ==
Waka Tsunoda of The Associated Press reviewed Creepers, praising it for its tone and tension.

=== Awards ===
- Bram Stoker Award for Best Novel (2005, won - tie with Dread in the Beast by Charlee Jacob)
