= Try! (2026 film) =

2026 dcumentary film

- Directed by: Oisín Mistéil
- Produced by: Claire McCabe
- Cinematography: Esme McNamee
- Edited by: Keith Walsh
- Music by: Andy Kirwan
- Production company: Pipedream Productions
- Release date: June 13, 2026 (Sheffield DocFest)

Try! is a 2026 Irish documentary film directed by Oisín Mistéil, in his feature directorial debut, and produced by Claire McCabe.

The film won the award for Best Irish Documentary at the Galway Film Fleadh 2026 and the Audience Award at the 2026 IFI Documentary Festival.

== Premise ==
Try! follows four Irish mixed ability rugby players who defy all expectations on their journey to the most inclusive and competitive World Cup you've never seen. This unique sport is 15-a-side, full contact rugby played by people with and without disabilities, all with the dream of lifting the trophy.

Lead character Richie was told he'd never get to play rugby because of his autism, but his mixed ability rugby team The Sunday’s Well Rebels made it possible - and as Richie says himself, he intends to pay them back in blood, sweat and tears.

Try! follows Richie, Maeve, Tommy and Paul, from wet and windy training nights to the nail-biting culmination of their World Cup dream. The film is a celebration of the power of sport in creating community for those who never belonged before.

== Development ==
Mistéil and McCabe began to develop the concept for Try! in 2022 as part of the IGNITE-Docs Development scheme. As they got to know the sport of mixed ability rugby in Ireland and the community around it, the idea of following Irish teams to the next World Cup began to take shape.

== Production ==
Principal photography took place from 2024 up to and including the Mixed Ability World Cup in Pamplona, Spain, in 2025.

The film focused on one main character from each of the four teams featured: Richie Philpott of Sunday’s Well Rebels, Cork; Maeve Owens of Ballincollig Trailblazers, Cork; Tommy Crawford of Malone Tornadoes, Belfast; and Paul Deacon of DLSP Vikings, Dublin.

== Release ==
Try! made its world premiere at Sheffield DocFest 2026. It had its Irish premiere at the Galway Film Fleadh 2026, where it won the award for Best Irish Feature Documentary. It subsequently won the Audience Award at the IFI Documentary Festival. Try! has screened at numerous festivals in the United States, including the Newport Beach Film Festival.

The film was released in select Irish cinemas on 2 October 2026.

== Reception ==
Screen Daily said the film was an "emotionally vibrant crowd pleaser", while Screen Anarchy called it "genuinely life-affirming".

Donald Clarke reviewing for the The Irish Times gave the film 3.5/5 stars, calling it "a tonic".
