= Do Not Enter (2026 film) =

2026 film by Marc Klasfeld

- Theatrical release poster
- Directed by: Marc Klasfeld
- Screenplay by: Stephen Susco; Spencer Mandel; Dikega Hadnot
- Based on: Creepers by David Morrell
- Produced by: Jordan Schur
- Starring: Jake Manley; Adeline Rudolph; Francesca Reale; Laurence O'Fuarain; Nicholas Hamilton; Javier Botet; Kai Caster; Shane Paul McGhie
- Cinematography: Yon Thomas
- Edited by: Patrick J. Smith
- Music by: Blitz//Berlin
- Production companies: Lionsgate; Suretone Pictures
- Distributed by: Lionsgate
- Release date: March 20, 2026
- Running time: 91 minutes
- Country: United States
- Language: English
- Budget: $7 million

Do Not Enter is a 2026 American horror thriller film directed by Marc Klasfeld and written by Stephen Susco, Spencer Mandel and Dikega Hadnot. It is based on David Morrell's 2005 novel Creepers. The film stars Jake Manley, Adeline Rudolph, Francesca Reale, Laurence O'Fuarain, Nicholas Hamilton, Javier Botet, Kai Caster, and Shane Paul McGhie.

Do Not Enter was released by Lionsgate on March 20, 2026.

== Plot ==
The "Creepers", an urbex group led by Rick alongside his girlfriend Diane, Vern, Cora, and JD, fail to gain traction on their videos. JD leaves the group to join another urbex group called the "Scavengers," consisting of Tod and Mack. Rick suggests that they explore The Paragon, an abandoned hotel rumored to be where gangster Meyer Lansky stashed $300 million. They watch a video by JD taunting them.

Vice News reporter Frank Balenger sees Diane's post announcing their upcoming exploration and joins the Creepers, despite Rick and Vern's distrust. They break into The Paragon and enter the lobby, where a chandelier nearly crushes Cora. Diane splits off from the group and is attacked by a creature. Rick tells the group that Diane is not answering her phone and to search for her. Cora tells Frank that Rick and Diane's relationship is strained, and that Rick is given the illusion of leadership because he supplies their equipment. She notices Frank's wedding band, to which Frank replies that he has a wife named Amanda.

While searching for Diane, Vern and Cora find a news report of The Paragon's last owner going missing after his wife's murder. Meanwhile, Rick's leg gets caught in a bear trap while looking with Frank. They return to the lobby and find various electronics strung on a large tree, including Diane's phone. They watch Diane's last video and hear more rumbling. Suddenly, they are ambushed by the Scavengers and held at gunpoint. JD is disturbed as Tod and Mack harass Cora. Tod pulls out Diane's bandana, causing Rick to attack him. Tod offers Rick the bandana before suddenly throwing him off the balcony. Frank then tells Tod that Rick had the only copy of The Paragon's floor plan. They go to the lower levels where they seemingly find Rick's body. Cora traverses over the collapsed floor separating them from the body, but discovers that it is a skeleton. Tod then shoots the wire that Cora used to swing over, abandoning her.

The group enters room 733 after hearing noises from it. Inside, they find a closet where a terrified young woman emerges. Frank recognizes her as Amanda's friend Beth, whom she explored the hotel with. Beth warns them that something is coming, and they are attacked by a pale, gaunt creature who kills JD. Diane awakens in an ornate room and finds a Satanic ritual book. Cora finds Rick, who is still alive, but they are attacked by the creature. Cora flees to the security room, where she sees a dead body and Diane on the security cameras. Cora watches a VHS tape detailing a ritual in which a person consumes a human heart. Meanwhile, Tod and Mack find the room containing Lansky's cash, but Mack panics and runs away. While fleeing, he dies after running into a razor wire trap. The creature finds Tod, ripping his heart out and consuming it.

Diane reads the book, discovering that The Paragon's owner sacrificed his wife to obtain immortality and supernatural powers. Cora warns Vern and Frank via walkie-talkie that the creature is coming for them. Vern reunites with Cora, but they are separated from Frank. Frank finds Amanda's corpse, finds Vern and Cora, and offers to search for Diane. Diane pretends to be the creature's wife to participate in the ritual, but uses the book to attack it. Frank sees the creature attacking Diane and tackles it over the balcony, killing himself and the creature.

Cora tells Diane that Rick sacrificed himself to save Cora. Diane looks for Rick, finding him alive. The Creepers hug, claim the money, and become famous. While on the way to their next exploration site, they dedicate it to Frank. Rick then reveals that he kept some of the money, giving it to the rest of the crew.

== Cast ==
- Jake Manley as Rick
- Adeline Rudolph as Diane
- Francesca Reale as Cora
- Laurence O'Fuarain as Frank Balenger
- Nicholas Hamilton as Tod
- Javier Botet as Pale Creature
- Kai Caster as JD
- Shane Paul McGhie as Vernon
- Brennan Keel Cook as Mack
- Cat Shank as Beth

== Production ==
On July 11, 2022, it was announced that Lionsgate and Suretone Pictures would co-finance the film, then titled Creepers, with Klasfeld serving as director.

On July 29, 2022, it was announced that Manley, Rudolph, Reale, O'Fuarain, Hamilton, Botet, Caster and Skylan Brooks were cast in the film.

In August 2022, it was announced that McGhie replaced Brooks and that filming occurred in Bulgaria. Later that same month, it was announced that Cook and Shank were cast in the film.

== Release ==
Do Not Enter was released in the United States on March 20, 2026, taking the original release date of I Can Only Imagine 2.

== Reception ==
George and Josh Bate of ScreenAnarchy gave the film a negative review, describing the film as "excruciatingly dull, unintentionally silly, and a viewing experience to avoid at all costs". On Common Sense Media, Jose Solis gave the film a positive review, writing that "this is a gorier version of the [Scooby-Doo] classic cartoon, monster included."
