= The Dreadful =

Gothic horror film

- Theatrical release poster
- Directed by: Natasha Kermani
- Written by: Natasha Kermani
- Produced by: Sophie Turner; Luke Daniels; Patrick Muldoon; Patrick Hibler; Greg Lauritano; James Herron; Tim Wu; Bull Blumenthal
- Starring: Sophie Turner; Kit Harington; Marcia Gay Harden; Laurence O'Fuarain; Jonathan Howard
- Cinematography: Julia Swain
- Edited by: Jeff Betancourt; Gabriel de Urioste
- Music by: Jamal Green
- Production companies: Black Magic; Redwire Pictures/Tunnel; Storyboard Media; Illium Pictures
- Distributed by: True Brit Entertainment (United Kingdom); Lionsgate (United States)
- Release dates: February 20, 2026 (United States); August 10, 2026 (United Kingdom)
- Running time: 94 minutes
- Countries: United Kingdom; United States
- Language: English

The Dreadful is a 2026 Gothic horror film written and directed by Natasha Kermani and starring Kit Harington, Sophie Turner, Marcia Gay Harden, Laurence O'Fuarain and Jonathan Howard. Turner told Collider that the film is based on the same Shin Buddhist parable on which the 1964 film Onibaba was based.

== Plot ==
Anne and her mother-in-law Morwen are late-medieval peasants who scrape by while awaiting the return of Anne's husband Seamus from the Wars of the Roses. Anne and Seamus are devoted to each other despite their opposing personalities.

Jago, Seamus's childhood friend, returns from war claiming they deserted but Seamus was killed by thieves. Morwen doubts him, but his tale confirms Anne's dream of Seamus's death. Anne begins glimpsing an armored knight in the woods.

Jago courts Anne, while Morwen warns that he has always envied Seamus and will steal her away, frightening Anne with threats that the Knights of Hell will drag the girl to Hell if she abandons her duty towards Morwen and forgets her late husband. When a ship wrecks nearby, the women scavenge it; Morwen secretly kills survivors. She later slits the throat of a pilgrim priest, Friar Penrose, for his relics, and a horrified Anne helps hide the body.

Anne grows closer to Jago, who comforts her that the knight she has continued to see is likely a real person. After dreaming of Morwen as a demon, she sleeps with him. He urges her to leave Morwen and live with him, but Anne confesses that Morwen both needs and frightens her. Morwen tightens her hold, using Anne as a distraction to kill and rob a traveler. A horse figurine from one victim seems to Anne a sign from the demonic knight.

Morwen threatens Jago with a knife when he comes to the cottage to see Anne, and terrifies Anne with tales of the Knights of Hell should she leave. After an internal spiritual struggle, Anne drugs Morwen and sneaks away to spend a joyful day with Jago. When Morwen wakes, she encounters the knight herself and follows him to the lovers. When the knight collapses, clawing at his helmet, she kills him for his purse.

After their night together, Anne confides to Jago her envy of the local Lady's wealth and her fears the demon Mammon has been influencing her, who assures her such feelings are natural. Anne resolves to live with Jago, defying Morwen, who reacts poorly. The couple's new life quickly sours when Anne catches Jago in a lie about how Seamus died. Jago confesses that the truth is that Seamus had grown ruthless and frightening in war, murdering comrades for loot. He killed an armored knight and stole his helmet; upon wearing it, he screamed as if burning. Jago fled and later lied about Seamus's death to win Anne.

In a flashback, Morwen removes the dead knight's helmet and discovers she killed her own son, his face grotesquely diseased and demonic. She dons the helmet to frighten Anne, but it burns her and she cannot take it back off. Anne splits the helmet with a cross, revealing a now-disfigured Morwen covered in boils and pustules, begging forgiveness for her sins.

The cursed helmet restores itself. Anne, unafraid, picks it up despite Morwen's warnings and appears like an angel to Morwen before the woman goes blind. Rejecting both Jago and Morwen's claims of ownership over her, Anne retrieves the helmet from a chest in the woods, and listens as it whispers to her.

== Cast ==
- Kit Harington as Jago
- Sophie Turner as Anne
- Marcia Gay Harden as Morwen
- Laurence O'Fuarain as Seamus
- Jonathan Howard as Brother Penros

== Production ==
The film was announced in February 2024, written and directed by Natasha Kermani with Sophie Turner starring and producing. Other producers on the film include Redwire Pictures/Tunnel's Luke Daniels and Storyboard Media's Patrick Muldoon and Patrick Hibler along with Bull Blumenthal. Greg Lauritano produces through his Black Magic production company. James Herron and Tim Wu co-produced through their production company created with Natasha Kermani, Illium Pictures. The cast also includes Kit Harington, at the recommendation of Turner after they worked together on the television series Game of Thrones. Marcia Gay Harden was added to the cast list in November 2024 with principal photography underway. Filming locations included Cornwall. In January 2025, the film was reported to be in post-production.

== Release ==
Lionsgate released the film in select theaters and digital on February 20, 2026. The film was released in the United Kingdom by True Brit Entertainment on August 10.

== Reception ==
Metacritic review
breakdown (unweighted)

Positive
1 (14%)
Mixed
3 (43%)
Negative
3 (43%)

On the review aggregator website Rotten Tomatoes, 36% of 36 critics' reviews are positive, with an average rating of 5.0/10. Metacritic, which uses a weighted average, assigned the film a score of 33 out of 100, based on 7 critics, indicating "generally unfavorable" reviews.

William Bibbiani of TheWrap gave the film a positive review and he said that: "The Dreadful is worth watching for Harden's perfidious performance alone. And whenever she's not on-screen it's worth the wait".

Matt Donato of Daily Dead gave the film a rating of 2.5/5 and a negative review and wrote: "The reunion of Game of Thrones favorites Kit Harington and Sophie Turner for Kermani's dour horror-romance is noteworthy—alas, The Dreadful is not". Therese Lacson of Collider gave the film a positive review, a rating of 6/10 and she said that: "Deeply mired in Gothic imagery and full of blood and religious guilt, The Dreadful is a thematically rich film that just can't seem to stick its landing in the third act".

Brandon Yu of The New York Times gave the film a negative review and said that: "The Dreadful faintly tugs at one strand of an interesting idea in this deeply silly horror fable: the hard fact of hunger". Marya E. Gates of RogerEbert.com rate the film a rating of 2/4 and wrote a negative review saying: "I just wish it were a medieval tapestry that worked as a whole, rather than just in fits and starts".

Frank Scheck of The Hollywood Reporter gave the film a negative review and simply wrote that: "Harden is the most entertaining thing about The Dreadful, which aims for classic folk horror but mostly feels tedious".
