= Bear trap =

Bear trap or beartrap may refer to:

== Technology ==
- A type of foothold trap meant to capture bears
- Cable bindings, a type of ski binding
- Beartrap (hauldown device), a device that allows helicopter to land on small flight decks in bad weather
- A physiotherapy device for trigger pointing and rolling out muscles

== Other uses ==
- The Soviet–Afghan War, where "bear" refers to the "Soviet bear"
- Beartrap Creek, a river in Wisconsin
- A trio of holes (15, 16, 17), named after golfer and course designer Jack Nicklaus, at the Champion Course of the PGA National Golf Club
- A sudden reversal in a bear market which forces short sellers to take a loss covering their positions
