= Horseshoe (film) =

2025 Irish film

- Theatrical film poster
- Directed by: Edwin Mullane; Adam O'Keeffe
- Written by: Adam O'Keeffe
- Produced by: Edwin Mullane; Maureen O'Connell; Adam O'Keeffe
- Starring: Carolyn Bracken; John Connors; Lalor Roddy; Jed Murray; Neill Fleming; Eric O'Brien
- Cinematography: Jass Foley
- Edited by: Tony Cranstoun
- Music by: Anna Mullarkey
- Release dates: July 12, 2025 (Galway); September 11, 2025 (Oldenburg); December 5, 2025 (Ireland)
- Running time: 88 mins.
- Country: Ireland
- Language: English

Horseshoe is a 2025 Irish dramedy film, directed by Edwin Mullane and Adam O'Keeffe, the latter of whom also wrote the screenplay. It stars Carolyn Bracken, John Connors, Lalor Roddy, Jed Murray, Neill Fleming, and Eric O'Brien. It premiered at the Galway Film Fleadh in 2025, before being released throughout Ireland later that same year.

== Synopsis ==
All families are mad. Four estranged siblings must reunite to settle their late father's will. Things get even more complicated when he shows up.

== Cast ==
- Carolyn Bracken as Cass Canavan
- Jed Murray as Jer Canavan
- Neill Fleming as Niall Canavan
- Eric O'Brien as Evan Canavan
- Lalor Roddy as Colm Canavan
- John Connors as Cormac Doherty
- Mary Murray as Toni
- Caroline Harvey as Ivy
- Aidan O'Sullivan as Barry
- Seán Doyle as Ian

== Reception ==
Tara Brady of The Irish Times stated that the film "reinvents its dog-eared premise with dark humour". Dora Matijević of Film Ireland said it "gave an introduction to these emerging voices" in regard to the writing/directing team of Edwin Mullane and Adam O'Keeffe.

Declan Burke of the Irish Examiner praised both Lalor Roddy's "brilliant" performance and the "bleak" cinematography from Jass Foley, which "makes the most of the County Sligo landscape". Ben Nicholson of The Film Verdict lauded the performances of Carolyn Bracken and Eric O'Brien. Chris O'Rourke of The Arts Review echoed the same sentiments, citing almost the entire cast's excellence. Scott Roxborough of The Hollywood Reporter called the film "darkly funny and deeply melancholic".

Stephen Porzio of JOE was also applauding Roddy for "stealing the show". Alan Zilberman of Washington City Paper said it's "a stinging illustration of how the death of a parent—is another kind of coming-of-age". And Todd Jorgenson of Cinemalogue also felt the performances were universally strong.

But Amber Wilkinson of Screen Daily lamented it was "somewhat over-plotted and with pacing issues". And Hilary A. White of the Irish Independent noted that "some scenes do veer close to jumping the shark".
