= Christy (2025 Irish film) =

Irish drama film

- Theatrical release poster
- Directed by: Brendan Canty
- Screenplay by: Alan O'Gorman
- Story by: Alan O'Gorman & Brendan Canty
- Produced by: Marina Brackenbury; Meredith Duff; Rory Gilmartin
- Starring: Danny Power; Diarmuid Noyes; Emma Willis; Alison Oliver; Chris Walley; Helen Behan
- Cinematography: Colm Hogan
- Edited by: Allyn Quigley
- Music by: Daithí
- Production companies: Sleeper Films; Wayward Films; Screen Ireland; BBC Film
- Distributed by: Altitude Film Distribution (United Kingdom); Wildcard Distribution (Ireland)
- Release dates: February 14, 2025 (Berlinale); August 29, 2025 (Ireland); September 5, 2025 (United Kingdom)
- Running time: 95 minutes
- Countries: Ireland; United Kingdom
- Language: English

Christy is a 2025 drama film directed by Brendan Canty, and written by Alan O'Gorman from a story by O'Gorman and Canty, and is inspired by a short film of the same name directed by Canty. It is starring Danny Power and Diarmuid Noyes.

It had its world premiere at the 75th Berlin International Film Festival on 14 February 2025 opening the Generation 14plus.

== Premise ==
Set in Knocknaheeny in Cork, Ireland, the film centres on two estranged brothers who attempt to reconnect with each other. Their mother died some years ago.

== Cast ==
- Danny Power as Christy
- Diarmuid Noyes as Shane
- Emma Willis as Stacey
- Alison Oliver as Chloe
- Chris Walley as Trevor
- Helen Behan as Pauline
- Lewis Brophy as Troy
- Jamie Forde as Robot

== Production ==
The film is the feature length debut of Irish director Brendan Canty. It is written by Alan O'Gorman from a story by O'Gorman and Canty, and is inspired by Canty's short film of the same name. Sleeper Films is among the producers of the film which received funding from Fís Éireann/Screen Ireland and BBC Film. Marina Brackenbury produces with Meredith Duff of Wayward Films, and Rory Gilmartin.

The film cast is led by Danny Power and Diarmuid Noyes and includes Helen Behan, Emma Willis, Cara Cullen, Jamie Forde, Lewis Brophy, Alison Oliver and Chris Walley. It features members of The Kabin Studio, a Cork-based community arts collective who perform hip-hop and in the spoken word. Principal photography took place on location in Knocknaheeny and Cork city centre in August 2023.

== Release ==
It had its world premiere at the 75th Berlin International Film Festival. It was also showcased at the 53rd Norwegian International Film Festival in Main Programme section on 17 August 2025.

The film was released in Ireland on 29 August 2025, and in the United Kingdom on 5 September.

In August 2025, the film was selected at the Network of the Festivals in the Adriatic Region Programmes in conjunction with 31st Sarajevo Film Festival for Adriatic Audience Award along with other six films.

== Accolades ==
It won best Irish film at the Galway Film Fleadh in July 2025. In January 2026, the film received 14 nominations at the Irish Film & Television Awards, including for best film and best director.

Award	Date	Category	Recipient	Result	Ref.
Berlin International Film Festival	21 February 2025	The Grand Prix for the Best Film in Generation 14plus	Christy	Won	
European Film Award	14 April 2026	Lux Award	Christy	Nominated	
Galway Film Fleadh	11 July 2025	Best Irish Film	Christy	Won	
Dublin Film Critics' Circle	18 December 2025	Best Irish Film	Christy	Won	
22nd Irish Film & Television Awards	20 February 2026	Best Film	Christy	Won	
22nd Irish Film & Television Awards	20 February 2026	Best Director	Brendan Canty	Won	
22nd Irish Film & Television Awards	20 February 2026	Best Script	Alan O'Gorman	Nominated	
22nd Irish Film & Television Awards	20 February 2026	Best Lead Actor	Daniel Power	Nominated	
22nd Irish Film & Television Awards	20 February 2026	Best Supporting Actor	Jamie Forde	Nominated	
22nd Irish Film & Television Awards	20 February 2026	Best Supporting Actor	Diarmuid Noyes	Nominated	
22nd Irish Film & Television Awards	20 February 2026	Best Supporting Actress	Emma Willis	Nominated	
22nd Irish Film & Television Awards	20 February 2026	Best Cinematography	Colm Hogan	Nominated	
22nd Irish Film & Television Awards	20 February 2026	Best Casting	Amy Rowan	Won	
22nd Irish Film & Television Awards	20 February 2026	Best Editing	Allyn Quigley	Won	
22nd Irish Film & Television Awards	20 February 2026	Best Hair and Makeup	Edwina Kelly and Jennie Readman	Nominated	
22nd Irish Film & Television Awards	20 February 2026	Best Costume Design	Hannah Bury	Nominated	
22nd Irish Film & Television Awards	20 February 2026	Best Original Music	Daithí Ó Drónaí	Nominated	
22nd Irish Film & Television Awards	20 February 2026	Best Production Design	Susie Cullen and Kevin Downey	Nominated	
