= The Limit Of =

2018 Irish film

- Theatrical film poster
- Directed by: Alan Mulligan
- Written by: Alan Mulligan
- Produced by: Alan Mulligan; Anthony Mulligan; Deirdre O'Meara; Tim Palmer; King Táine
- Starring: Laurence O'Fuarain; Sarah Carroll; Sonya O'Donoghue; Ally Ní Chiaráin
- Cinematography: Daniel Sorin-Balteanu
- Edited by: Alan Mulligan; Tim Palmer; Daniel Sorin-Balteanu
- Release dates: October 7, 2018 (Tucson); April 5, 2019 (Ireland)
- Running time: 89 mins.
- Country: Ireland
- Language: English

The Limit Of is a 2018 Irish mystery-thriller film, directed and written by Alan Mulligan. It stars Laurence O'Fuarain, Sarah Carroll, Sonya O'Donoghue, and Ally Ní Chiráin. It premiered at the Tucson Film & Music Festival in 2018, before being released in Ireland in 2019.

== Synopsis ==
James is a banker at the tail-end of the recession. A family tragedy caused by his employer makes him take action. But a mysterious co-worker Alison has her own agenda - a look at modern-day greed and desire.

== Cast ==
- Laurence O'Fuarain as James Allen
- Sarah Carroll as Alison Murphy
- Sonya O'Donoghue as Margaret O'Connell
- Ally Ní Chiaráin as Molly Allen
- Des Carney as Andrew Cullen
- Kevin McCormack as Ger Fitzpatrick
- Anthony Mulligan as Mike Williams
- Gail Fitzpatrick as Nora Leonard
- David Murray as Dr. Alan Ryan
- Richard Wall as Fenton Allen
- Joanne Brennan as News Anchor

== Reception ==
Deirdre Molumby of Entertainment.ie commended the film as "an immersive experience". Gareth O'Connor of Movies.ie found Alan Mulligan's "script is sharp enough" to make an impact. Stephen Gaffney of The Movie Waffler rated it 3.5/5 stars, referring to it as "a promising directorial debut from Mulligan".

Sean O'Rourke of Film Ireland gives "special praise to Sonya O'Donoghue's…wonderful performance". Paddy Kehoe of RTÉ lauded Laurence O'Fuarain, Sarah Carroll, and Ally Ní Chiaráin for their "equally impressive performances".

However, Fran Winston of No More Workhorse derided it as a film "whose heart is in the right place, but the execution isn't". Donald Clarke of The Irish Times opined, "The threadbare plot makes little sense and the characters' motivations are too often incomprehensible." And Katy Hayes of The Sunday Times remarked, "The influences of Steve McQueen's Shame and Sam Taylor-Johnson's Fifty Shades of Grey are apparent, but The Limit Of has neither the psychological intelligence of the former nor the committed insouciance of the latter."
