= Lemonade (2026 film) =

Irish drama film

- Directed by: Kim Bartley
- Screenplay by: Kim Bartley
- Produced by: Rachel Lysaght; Farah Abushwesha
- Starring: Barry Keoghan; Lewis Brophy; Carla Tous
- Cinematography: Colm Hogan
- Music by: Siôn Trefor; Ioana Șelaru; Galia Arad
- Production companies: Underground Films; Rocliffe Productions; Wolfcub
- Distributed by: Breakout Pictures
- Release date: 12 September 2026 (TIFF)
- Running time: 112 minutes
- Countries: Ireland; United Kingdom
- Language: English

Lemonade is a 2026 Irish drama film written and directed by Kim Bartley and starring Lewis Brophy, Carla Tous and Barry Keoghan.

The film premiered at the 2026 Toronto International Film Festival on 12 September 2026.

== Premise ==
A teenager approaching his eighteenth birthday prepares to leave foster care, and reconnects with a former social worker.

== Cast ==
- Lewis Brophy as Danny
- Barry Keoghan as Josh
- Carla Tous as Mila
- Connie Doona
- Graham Earley
- Eileen Walsh
- Imelda May

== Production ==
The film is written and directed by documentarian Kim Bartley in her narrative feature film directorial debut. The film is a co-production between Underground Films and Rocliffe Productions and received support from Screen Ireland. It is produced by Rachel Lysaght and Farah Abushwesha. Executive producers on the film include Barry Keoghan through his production company Wolfcub, with Keoghan also acting in the film. Siôn Trefor, Ioana Șelaru and Galia Arad composed the original score for the film. Colm Hogan is the cinematographer.

Keoghan himself had experience of foster care when he was younger, and speaking about his experience working on the film, said:

"There are moments in Lemonade when I was like, 'this is too to-the-bone.' Honestly, it makes me emotional just chatting about it, but it's beautiful".

As well as Keoghan, the cast includes Lewis Brophy, Carla Tous, Connie Doona and Graham Earley, as well as Eileen Walsh and Imelda May.

Principal photography took place in Dublin in January 2026.

== Release ==
The film premiered at the 2026 Toronto International Film Festival on 12 September 2026.
