= You'll Never Believe Who's Dead =

Irish Christmas comedy film

- Directed by: Dallan Shovlin
- Screenplay by: Dallan Shovlin
- Produced by: Trevor Birney; Patrick O’Neill; Olly Butler
- Starring: Peter Claffey; Ardal O'Hanlon; Michelle Fairley
- Production companies: Fine Point Films; Orb Films; Wildcard
- Release date: 10 July 2026 (Galway)
- Countries: Ireland; United Kingdom
- Language: English

You'll Never Believe Who's Dead is a 2026 Irish Christmas black comedy heist film written and directed by Dallan Shovlin and starring Peter Claffey, Michelle Fairley and Ardal O'Hanlon. The world premiere was on 10 July 2026 at the Galway Film Fleadh, where it won the Best Irish First Feature Award.

== Premise ==
After a botched robbery is committed locally, an Irish family reunited at Christmas time talk themselves into doing a better heist.

== Cast ==
- Peter Claffey
- Ardal O'Hanlon
- Michelle Fairley
- Ruth Codd
- Jacob McCarthy
- Simone Kirby
- Stephen Rea

== Production ==
The film is written and directed by Dallan Shovlin, in their feature length debut. It is produced by Trevor Birney of Fine Point Films, Patrick O’Neill of Wildcard, and Olly Butler of Orb Films. Funding came from UK Global Screen Fund, Screen Ireland and Northern Ireland Screen.

The cast is led by Michelle Fairley, Ardal O'Hanlon and Peter Claffey with Ruth Codd, Jacob McCarthy, Simone Kirby and Stephen Rea.

Principal photography took place in County Sligo in Ireland in 2025, and was in post-production by July 2025. Filming locations included Yeats' Grave in Sligo.

== Release ==
The film had a world premiere on 10 July 2026, at the Galway Film Fleadh.

== Reception ==
The film was described as "propulsive black comedy which makes the most of its sterling cast and raucous premise" by Nikki Baughan for Screen Daily.

The film won the Best Irish First Feature Award at the 2026 Galway Film Fleadh.
