= Winter's End (film) =

2005 Irish film

- Theatrical film poster
- Directed by: Patrick Kenny
- Written by: Patrick Kenny
- Produced by: Damien Donnelly
- Starring: Jill Bradbury; Michael Crowley; Paul Whyte
- Cinematography: Robert Donald
- Edited by: Kevin Hughes
- Music by: Gregory Magee
- Release date: July 10, 2005 (Galway)
- Running time: 98 mins.
- Country: Ireland
- Language: English

Winter's End is a 2005 Irish thriller film, directed and written by Patrick Kenny. It stars Jill Bradbury, Michael Crowley, and Paul Whyte. It premiered at the Galway Film Fleadh in 2005.

== Plot ==
On a rural isolated farm, Amy Rose lives with her two brothers Henry and Sean. Amy suffers from abuse and oppression at the hands of her older brother Henry until she gains independence.

== Cast ==
- Jill Bradbury as Amy Rose
- Michael Crowley as Henry Rose
- Paul Whyte as Sean Rose
- Adam Goodwin as Jack Davis
- Donie Ryan as Ben Lambert
- Brendan Corcoran as Henry's Father (young)

== Reception ==
In his review for Chicago Reader, Joshua Katzman praised the initial build up of tension by the director but criticised plot inconsistencies which dissipated that tension.

=== Awards ===
- Best Music in a Film Award Winner at the IFTA Film & Drama Awards (2005, won - Gregory Magee)
- Best Actress in a Feature Film Award at the IFTA Film & Drama Awards (2005, nominated - Jillian Bradbury)
