= Swansong (film) =

2015 British film

- Theatrical film poster
- Directed by: Douglas Ray
- Written by: Douglas Ray
- Produced by: Jonathan Rawlinson; Douglas Ray
- Starring: Matt Berry; Eva Birthistle; Antonia Campbell-Hughes; Andrew Hawley
- Cinematography: Jan Pester
- Edited by: Colin Ray
- Music by: Finn McNicholas
- Release dates: July 11, 2015 (Galway); September 28, 2015 (Raindance)
- Running time: 74 mins.
- Country: United Kingdom
- Language: English

Swansong is a 2015 British dark comedy-thriller film, written and directed by Douglas Ray. It stars Matt Berry, Eva Birthistle, Antonia Campbell-Hughes, and Andrew Hawley. It premiered at Galway Film Fleadh in 2015.

== Cast ==
- Matt Berry as Toby Taylor
- Eva Birthistle as Karen Prince
- Antonia Campbell-Hughes as Jamie
- Andrew Hawley as Danny
- Anastasia Hille as Dr. Bates
- Paul Hilton as Mark Prince
- James Lance as Simon Dunton

== Reception ==
Mark Cunliffe of The Geek Show rated the film 1.5/5 stars, opining that the film was more "psychological thriller than dark comedy". He did add that the entire cast was good.
