= Lewis Brophy =

Irish actor

- Brophy in 2026
- Education: Bow Street Academy
- Occupation: Actor
- Years active: 2017–present

Lewis Brophy is an Irish actor. His film credits include Christy (2025).

== Career ==
Having trained as a boxer at Ballybough Boxing Club in Dublin prior to pursuing an acting career, Brophy played a younger version of MMA fighter Conor McGregor in a Beats by Dre commercial at age 14 years-old.He later studied drama at Bow Street Academy in Dublin and acted in immersive theatre.

Brophy's television credits include Shane Meadows directed series The Virtues and Irish crime drama Kin. His early film roles included appearing in Joe Lawlor and Christine Molloy art-heist drama Baltimore alongside Imogen Poots and Tom Vaughan-Lawlor (2023), and portrayed a drug addict in 1980s-set Spilt Milk (2024), and in Claire Frances Byrne's coming-of-age drama Ready Or Not (2025). That year, Brophy could be seen in critically acclaimed 2025 Irish film Christy. He was named a Screen Daily 'Star of Tomorrow' in 2025.

Brophy has a lead role alongside Barry Keoghan in Irish drama film Lemonade (2026). In 2026, Brophy was cast in an upcoming role in Amazon Prime Video series Boys of Tommen.

== Partial filmography ==
Key
| † | Denotes works that have not yet been released |

| Year | Title | Role | Notes |
|---|---|---|---|
| 2019 | The Virtues | Nomad | 2 episodes |
| 2023 | Kin | Shane | 2 episodes |
| 2023 | Baltimore | Martin | |
| 2024 | Dead and Buried | Terry | 3 episodes |
| 2024 | Spilt Milk | Oisin | |
| 2025 | Christy | Troy | |
| 2025 | Ready or Not | Byrner | |
| 2026 | Lemonade | Danny | |
| TBA | Boys of Tommen † | | Filming |
