= Spilt Milk (film) =

2024 Irish film

- Theatrical film poster
- Directed by: Brian Durnin
- Written by: Cara Loftus
- Produced by: James Heath; Laura McNicholas
- Starring: Cillian Sullivan; Naoise Kelly; Danielle Galligan; Laurence O'Fuarain; Lewis Brophy
- Cinematography: Cathal Watters
- Edited by: Colin Monie
- Music by: Scott Twynholm
- Release date: 9 November 2024 (Tallinn)
- Running time: 91 mins.
- Country: Ireland
- Language: English

Spilt Milk is a 2024 Irish film, directed by Brian Durnin and written by Cara Loftus. It stars Cillian Sullivan, Naoise Kelly, Danielle Galligan, Laurence O'Fuarain, and Lewis Brophy. It premiered at the Tallinn Black Nights Film Festival in 2024.

== Synopsis ==
11 year-old boy dreams of becoming a great detective like his TV hero Kojak. He sets up a private investigation with his best friend, but the disappearance of his older brother sets them off down a dark path.

== Cast ==
- Cillian Sullivan as Bobby O'Brien
- Naoise Kelly as Nell Casey
- Danielle Galligan as Maura O'Brien
- Laurence O'Fuarain as John O'Brien
- Lewis Brophy as Oisín O'Brien
- Gordon Barry as Bren Casey
- Ryan Burke as Paddy Reid
- Muiris Crowley as Garda Walsh
- Denise McCormack as Mrs. Lee
- Emmet Kirwan as Mr. Finnegan
- Justin Daniels-Anene as Tommy Mulligan
- Sallay Garnett as Mrs. Mulligan
- John Burke as Gerry
- Niamh Cremin as Mags
- Hilda Fay as Angela
- Charleigh Bailey as Patricia
- Pom Boyd as Nan
- Rory Mullen as Jim Kane

== Reception ==
Aoife Fealy of Film Ireland stated the film "is a surprising gem that harkens back to other Irish classics such as Into The West (1992), The Snapper (1993), and Mickybo and Me (2004)". Hilary White of the Irish Independent loved how the film "morphs at this point from a Roddy Doyle-ish sweet-and-salty setup, to a grittier loss-of-innocence drama".

Amber Wilkinson of Eye for Film praised the filmmakers: "Brian Durnin and Cara Loftus deserve praise for even tackling such a tricky tightrope in the first place". Fionnuala Halligan of Screen Daily lauded the performances of the main cast in this "ambitious debut", including Cillian Sullivan, Laurence O'Fuarain, and Danielle Galligan.

Alan Corr of RTÉ commended the work of Naoise Kelly ("a firecracker performance") and Pom Boyd ("comic relief"). Andrew MacGregor of David Reviews said the film "is wonderfully evocative of time and place" with its 1980s Dublin setting. And Kevin Ibbotson-Wight of The Wee Review compared it as "narratively similar to Belfast (2021)" and "The Hardy Boys meets Ken Loach".
