= Property of the State (film) =

2016 British film

- Theatrical film poster
- Directed by: Kit Ryan
- Written by: Susan Morrall; Kit Ryan; Peter Woodward
- Produced by: Jo Gilbert; Alan Latham; James T. Ryan; Terence Ryan; Ken Tuohy
- Starring: Aisling Loftus; Patrick Gibson; Hazel Doupe; David Rawle; Elaine Cassidy; Martin McCann; Hugh O'Conor; Gemma-Leah Devereux; Joe McGann; Finbar Lynch
- Cinematography: Gerry Lively
- Edited by: Jeremy Gibbs
- Music by: Pol Brennan
- Release dates: July 6, 2016 (Galway); October 27, 2017 (UK)
- Running time: 107 mins.
- Country: United Kingdom
- Language: English

Property of the State is a 2016 British biographical drama film, directed by Kit Ryan, who also co-wrote alongside Susan Morrall and Peter Woodward. It stars Aisling Loftus, Patrick Gibson, Elaine Cassidy, Martin McCann, Hazel Doupe, David Rawle, Joe McGann, Finbar Lynch, Gemma-Leah Devereux, and Hugh O'Conor. It premiered at the Galway Film Fleadh in 2016, before being released throughout the UK the following year.

== Synopsis ==
A woman must deal with the devastating effects of having a murderer for a brother.

== Cast ==
- Aisling Loftus as Ann Marie O'Donnell (older)
  - Hazel Doupe as Ann Marie (young)
- Patrick Gibson as Brendan O'Donnell (older)
  - David Rawle as Brendan (young)
- Hugh O'Conor as Fr. Joe Walsh
- Elaine Cassidy as Margaret
- Martin McCann as Finbar
- Joe McGann as Pros. Coun. Cummins
- Gemma-Leah Devereux as Beth
- Finbar Lynch as Heffernan

== Reception ==
On the review aggregator website Rotten Tomatoes, 40% of 5 critics' reviews are positive, with an average rating of 5.00/10.

Alan Corr of RTÉ praised the performances, particularly those of Aisling Loftus, Elaine Cassidy, Hugh O'Conor, David Rawle, and Patrick Gibson. Tara Brady of The Irish Times dubbed it "a relentlessly grim chronicle of systemic failure and institutional abuse". Baz Nugent of Geek Ireland also lauded Gibson for "standing out with his impressive performance".

But Paul Whitington of the Irish Independent opined that the film "clunks along like a TV movie". Kevin Harley of Total Film said "the narrative fails". And Mike Massie of Gone with the Twins chided it for many similar reasons, rating it a 5/10.
