= Nicholas Hamilton =

Australian actor and singer (born 2000)

- Hamilton in 2026
- Born: Nicholas William Hamilton; 4 May 2000 (age 26); Lismore, New South Wales, Australia
- Occupations: Actor; musician
- Years active: 2013–present

Nicholas William Hamilton (born 4 May 2000) is an Australian actor and musician. He is best known for portraying Rellian in Captain Fantastic (2016), Henry Bowers in It Chapter One (2017) and Chapter Two (2019), and superhero Maverick in Gen V (2023–2025) and The Boys (2026).

== Early life ==
Hamilton was born in Lismore, New South Wales, Australia, to Vicki Atkins and Craig Hamilton and grew up in Alstonville; he graduated from Alstonville High School in 2018. He has a brother named Joshua "JJ" Hamilton and two sisters namely Rebecca Hamilton and Rachel Hamilton. His uncle died from cancer in 2011, which he credits as starting his career, stating "I knew I had to pursue acting for him." His first role was the part of Elvis Presley in a grade five school play. Hamilton said he reluctantly took it, but 'really enjoyed [the] whole process' of rehearsal, and later joined a local acting agency.

== Career ==
=== Acting ===
Hamilton gained industry attention in the 2013 short film Time, directed by Liam Connor. He played a young boy who believed in time travel. The film was a finalist of the 2013 Tropfest Short Film Festival, and Hamilton won an award at the festival for Best Male Actor. This gained him the attention of Catherine Poulton, an agent in Melbourne, Victoria, Australia. He began his screen career with a role in Mako: Island of Secrets, and parts in short films such as Jackrabbit and Letter to Annabelle.

Hamilton's first role in a feature film was as Nicole Kidman and Joseph Fiennes' son in the Australian drama-suspense film Strangerland. In early 2016, he landed a guest role in Wanted alongside Rebecca Gibney. His first American performance was as Rellian in 2016's Captain Fantastic, for which he was nominated for Best Supporting Actor at the Young Artist Awards, along with the Screen Actors Guild Award for Outstanding Performance by a Cast in a Motion Picture. In 2014, after filming Captain Fantastic, he joined with WME and 3 Arts Entertainment. In 2017, he portrayed Lucas Hanson in the film adaptation of The Dark Tower, as well as his most well-known character portrayal of Henry Bowers in IT. To prepare for the role of Bowers, he read the original novel and liaised with Jarred Blancard, who portrayed Bowers in the 1990 miniseries. In 2018, it was announced he would portray Private Noel Grimes in Danger Close, an Australian film centered on the Battle of Long Tan and Endless/Undying as Chris, a teenager who finds himself trapped in a purgatory searching for a way to make contact with his true love. He returned as young Henry Bowers in It Chapter Two, released in 2019.

In June 2021, Hamilton appeared in Season 2 of Hulu's Love, Victor. He also led Action Royale, a Snapchat Original Series as Trilby, a teenager who starts an underground esports gambling ring to pay off his father's debts and appeared in true-story-film Brave the Dark as Nate, a homeless teen struggling to find his purpose and the courage to confront the darkness of his past. On Prime Video's The Boys spinoff Gen V, Hamilton portrayed invisible superhero Maverick, the son of Translucent. He reprised the role in season 5 of The Boys.

In 2024, Hamilton played Stu in The Pradeeps of Pittsburgh for Amazon Freevee. It has been announced that he will play Tod in Lionsgate's Do Not Enter, and Lance Lunar in Max Talisman's Things Like This. In August 2025, he joined the cast of Luca Guadagnino's film Artificial.

=== Music ===
In January 2021, he released his debut single, "Different Year". He subsequently released singles "noRoom", a duet between Hamilton and co-writer Savs, "In Line" and "Pretty Young", the latter becoming the title track of his 2021 debut EP of the same name. This EP also features the tracks "Everything to Lose" and "Intro".

Hamilton released his single, "Alone", in May 2023. He sold out his first ever headline concert in May 2023 at Rockwood Music Hall. His next single, "Spins", was released on 16 June 2023.

== Personal life ==
Hamilton moved from his home country of Australia to Los Angeles in 2019 at the age of 18. He has a dog named Nala.

Hamilton is gay. He came out at age 18.

Hamilton has also gained a following on the social media site TikTok where he makes cocktails and tastes ready-made alcoholic beverages.

== Filmography ==
=== Film ===
Year	Title	Role	Notes
2013	Time	James	Short film
2015	Strangerland	Tom Parker	
2016	Captain Fantastic	Rellian	
2017	The Dark Tower	Lucas Hanson	
2017	It	Henry Bowers	
2019	Danger Close: The Battle of Long Tan	Private Noel Grimes	
2019	It Chapter Two	Young Henry Bowers	
2020	Endless	Chris Douglas	
2023	Brave the Dark	Nate	
2025	Hurricanna	Daniel	
2026	Do Not Enter	Tod	
2026	Artificial	TBA	Post-production
TBA	Things Like This	Lance Lunar	Post-production

=== Television ===
Year	Title	Role	Notes
2013	Mako: Island of Secrets	Ben	Episode: "I Don't Believe in Mermaids"
2016	Wanted	Jamie	Episode: "Run Lola Run"
2021	Love, Victor	Charlie	Episode: "Victor's Day Off"
2021	Action Royale	Trilby	Series regular
2023–2025	Gen V	Maverick	Voice; 5 episodes
2024	The Pradeeps of Pittsburgh	Stu	Series regular
2026	The Boys	Maverick	Voice; Episode: "Every One of You Sons of Bitches"
2026	The Creep Tapes	Greg	Episode: "Greg"

== Discography ==
=== Singles ===
Year	Title
2021	"Different Year"
2021	"noRoom"
2021	"In Line"
2021	"Pretty Young"
2023	"Alone"
2023	"Spins"

=== EPs ===
Year	Title
2021	Pretty Young

== Awards and nominations ==
Year	Award	Category	Work	Result	Ref.
2013	Tropfest Short Film Award	Best Actor	Time	Won	
2017	Screen Actors Guild Award	Outstanding Performance by a Cast in a Motion Picture	Captain Fantastic	Nominated	
2017	Young Artist Award	Best Supporting Actor	Captain Fantastic	Nominated	
