= Adeline Rudolph =

Hong Kong-British actress (born 1995)

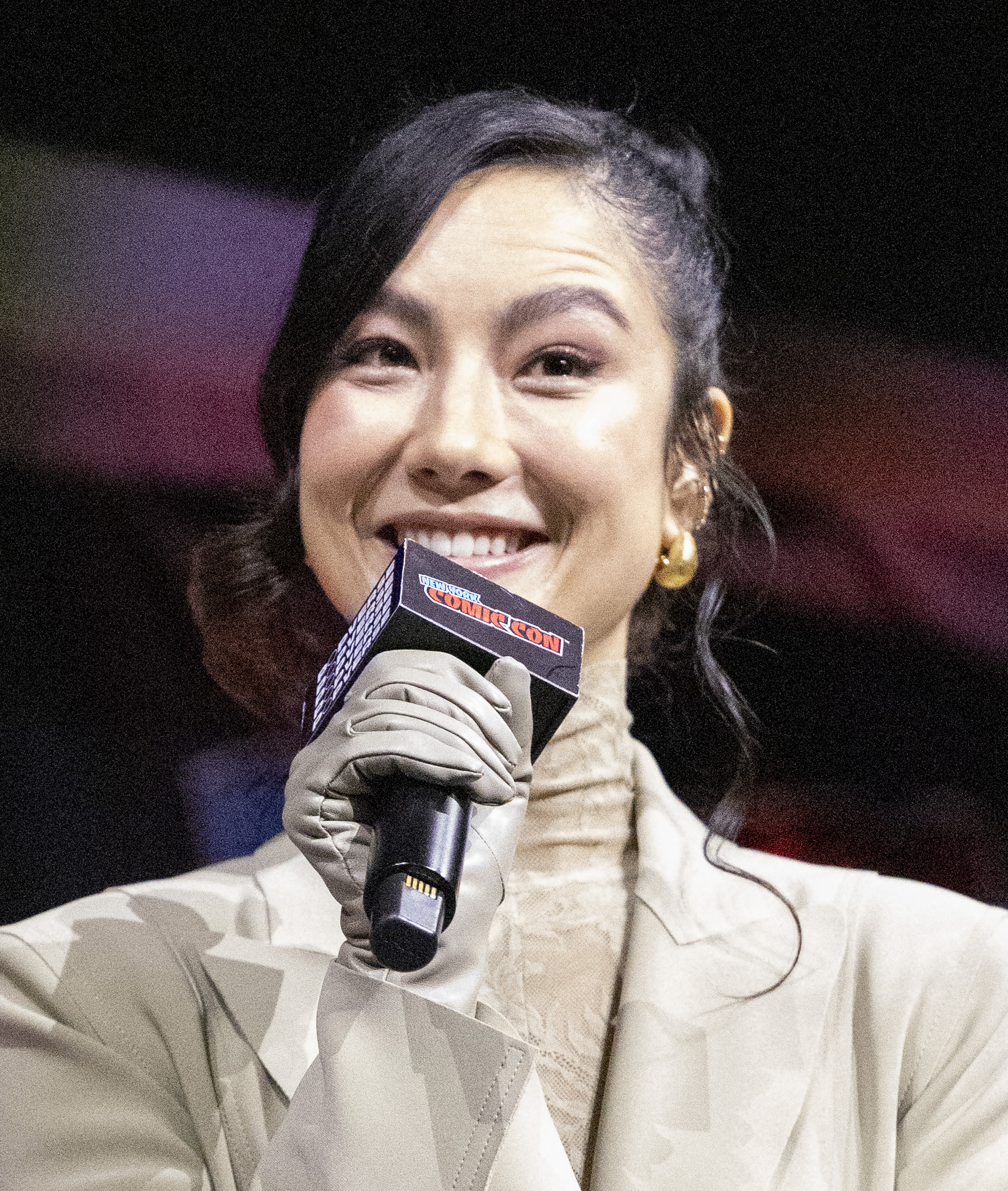
- Rudolph at the 2025 New York Comic Con
- Born: 10 February 1995 (age 31); British Hong Kong
- Education: University College London
- Occupations: Actress; model
- Years active: 2018–present

Adeline Rudolph (born 10 February 1995) is a British actress. She began her career in modeling before making her debut in the Netflix series Chilling Adventures of Sabrina (2018–2020). She has since appeared in the CW series Riverdale (2021), the Netflix adaptation of Resident Evil (2022), and the Amazon Prime Video series Neagley (2026). She also portrayed Kitana in the film Mortal Kombat II (2026).

== Early life and education ==
Born on 10 February 1995 in British Hong Kong, Rudolph is of German and Korean descent. She has a twin sister Caroline.

Rudolph attended the German Swiss International School. She went on to study Political Science at University College London (UCL), graduating in 2017.

== Career ==
While in university, Rudolph signed with Next Model Management. She modeled in the European, Hong Kong, and Korean markets where she appeared in Marie Claire Beauty and Elle Beauty campaigns. After graduating, she ventured into acting, and made her acting debut as Agatha in the Netflix series Chilling Adventures of Sabrina. In July 2020, Rudolph was cast in the title role of a Tomie series adaptation, which was set to be released on Quibi. However, Quibi shut down that December, and the adaptation is in development hell as of January 2024.

Rudolph later had a recurring role as Minerva in the fifth season of the CW series Riverdale in 2021, and a main role as Billie Wesker in the Netflix adaptation of Resident Evil in 2022. In July 2022, Rudolph was cast in the horror film Creepers. In 2023, she was cast as Bobbie Jo Song in Hellboy: The Crooked Man, as well as Kitana in Mortal Kombat II.

== Filmography ==
Key
†	Denotes films that have not yet been released

=== Film ===
Year	Title	Role	Notes	Ref.
2024	Hellboy: The Crooked Man	Bobbie Jo Song		
2026	Do Not Enter	Diane		
2026	Mortal Kombat II	Kitana		
TBA	Perfect Girl †	Soyeon	Filming	
TBA	13 Going on 30 †		Filming	
TBA	Love Love †		Filming	

=== Television ===
Year	Title	Role	Notes	Ref.
2018–2020	Chilling Adventures of Sabrina	Agatha	Main role; 36 episodes	
2021	Riverdale	Minerva Marble	Recurring role; 5 episodes	
2022	Resident Evil	Billie Wesker	Main role; 8 episodes	
2024	Laid	Jordana	Guest role; 2 episodes	
2026	Neagley	Renee Birdwhistle	Main role; 8 episodes	

== Awards and nominations ==
Year	Award	Category	Work	Result	Ref.
2026	Critics' Choice Super Awards	Best Actress in a Superhero Movie	Mortal Kombat II	Nominated	
