= Beartrap Creek =

Stream in Wisconsin, US

Coordinates: 46°38′26″N 90°42′41″W

Beartrap Creek is a stream in Ashland and Bayfield counties, Wisconsin, in the United States.

Beartrap Creek was named from an incident when a settler caught a black bear in a trap. Bear Trap Creek Trail is located in the town of Salina just north of Syracuse and runs 1.6 miles from 7th North Street (across from Pilot Travel Center) to the Mattydale Plaza.

== See also ==
- List of rivers of Wisconsin
