= Báite =

2025 Irish film

- Theatrical film poster
- Directed by: Ruán Magan
- Written by: Sheena Lambert
- Produced by: John Brady; Siobhán Ní Ghadhra
- Starring: Eleanor O'Brien; Moe Dunford
- Cinematography: Ronan Fox
- Edited by: John Murphy
- Music by: Craig Stuart Garfinkle; Eímear Noone
- Release dates: July 9, 2025 (Galway); March 6, 2026 (Ireland)
- Running time: 95 mins.
- Country: Ireland
- Language: Irish Gaelic

Báite (English: The Drowned) is a 2025 Irish-language film noir film, directed by Ruán Magan and written by Sheena Lambert, based on her own 2015 novel, The Lake. It stars Eleanor O'Brien and Moe Dunford. It premiered at the Galway Film Fleadh in 2025, before being released in Ireland the following year of 2026.

== Synopsis ==
A woman's body is found under the waters of a lake in the countryside, and the arrival of a Detective from Dublin is the last thing Peggy, the owner of Casey's Pub, needs as she tries to save her business and her family.

== Cast ==
- Eleanor O'Brien as Peggy Casey
- Moe Dunford as Det. Frank Ryan
- Padraig O'Loinsigh as Coleman Devitt
- Fionnuala Gygax as Carla Casey
- Gearoid Kavanagh as Hugo Casey
- Juliette Crosbie as Bernadette Murphy
- Tara Breathnach as Mrs. Grogan
- Dmitry Vinokurov as Carl Bauer
- Amy-Joyce Hastings as Bangharda McNally
- Mark MacGearailt as Jerome Casey

== Reception ==
Brian Ó Tiomáin of Film Ireland lauded director Ruán Magan, whom he says "delivers a gentle mix of subtle visual storytelling and rich production design". Bren Murphy of RTÉ praised the lead performances of Moe Dunford ("as versatile as ever") and Eleanor O'Brien ("wonderfully engaging").

Tara Brady of The Irish Times stated the film "boasts pedigree, handsome visuals and solid, absorbing storytelling from writer Sheena Lambert". Stephen Porzio of JOE added Juliette Crosbie alongside the leads, and compared the film to "Twin Peaks and/or True Detective".

Hilary White of the Irish Independent chided the film for "slipping into melodrama". Allan Hunter of Screen Daily opined that the film "is watchable without ever becoming truly gripping". And Keith McEvoy of Comic Buzz dubbed it "handsome but overly familiar terrain".
