= Laurence O'Fuarain =

Irish actor (born 1990)

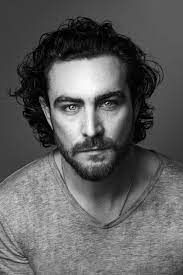
- Born: 24 April 1990 (age 36); Dublin, Ireland
- Occupation: Actor
- Years active: 2015–present

Laurence O'Fuarain (born 24 April 1990) is an Irish actor, having had roles in season 5 of Game of Thrones (2015), Rebellion (2016), season 5 of Vikings (2017) and Into the Badlands (2017). He appears as Fjall the warrior in the Netflix miniseries The Witcher: Blood Origin (2022), and starred as JP in Guy Ritchie's television series The Gentlemen (2024).

== Early life and education ==
Laurence O'Fuarain studied advertising and marketing at the Institute of Technology, Tallaght when by chance, got involved in the making of some short films of which he enjoyed. After a successful audition to join the Bow Street Academy, he decided to leave the ITT to concentrate on acting. In 2014, O'Fuarain graduated from the Programme of Screen Acting at Bow Street Academy in Dublin and was in the same group of alumni as Niamh Algar. In his spare time, O'Fuarain is a keen angler.

== Career ==
In 2015, straight after the academy, O'Fuarain made his film debut in the Irish film The Limit Of, although the film was not released until 2018. He followed that with small roles in The Secret Scripture (2016) and in a single episode of season 5 of Game of Thrones. The same year he landed a recurring role as Desmond Byrne in Rebellion. In 2017, O'Fuarain picked up small roles in season 5 of Vikings and also Into the Badlands. In 2018, O'Fuarain secured the part of Vern in the film Viking Destiny opposite Terrance Stamp and Will Mellor, as Kevin Gunn in Don't Go and in Black '47.

In August 2021, O'Fuarain began filming of the Netflix miniseries The Witcher: Blood Origin, set in a time 1,200 years before The Witcher, and O'Fuarain stars as Fjall, of a clan of warriors sworn to protect a King in a quest for redemption, in a cast which includes Lenny Henry, Mirren Mack and Michelle Yeoh. The Witcher: Blood Origin aired on Netflix on 25 December 2022.

In 2024, he starred as JP Ward, head of a travelling community, in the Netflix Guy Ritchie television series The Gentlemen, alongside Theo James, Kaya Scodelario, and Daniel Ings.

== Filmography ==
=== Film ===
Year	Title	Role	Notes
2016	The Secret Scripture	Detective	
2018	The Limit Of	James Allen	
2018	Viking Destiny	Vern	
2018	Don't Go	Kevin Gunne	
2018	Black '47	I.C Sub Constable	
2021	Who We Love	Joe	
2024	Split Milk	John O'Brien	
2026	The Dreadful	Seamus	Post-production
2026	Do Not Enter	Balenger	Post-production

=== Television ===
Year	Title	Role	Notes
2015	Red Rock	Jacko Jones	13 episodes
2015	Game of Thrones	Simpson	Season 5, episode 10: "Mother's Mercy"
2016	Can't Cope, Won't Cope	Lorcan	4 episodes
2016	Rebellion	Desmond Byrne	6 episodes: "The Reckoning", "Surrender", "Under Siege", "To Arms"
2017	Vikings	Hakon	Season 5, episode 6: "The Message"
2017	Into the Badlands	Bowler Hat	Chapter XVI: "Wolf's Breath, Dragon Fire"
2022	The Witcher: Blood Origin	Fjall	Main role; 4 episodes
2024	The Gentlemen	JP Ward	Guest role; 2 episodes
2025	The Sandman	Thor	4 episodes
