= Aontas (film) =

2025 Irish film

- Promotional poster
- Directed by: Damian McCann
- Written by: Sarah Gordon; Damian McCann
- Produced by: Órfhlaith Ní Chearnaigh; Christopher Myers
- Starring: Carrie Crowley; Bríd Brennan; Eva-Jane Gaffney; Art Parkinson; Marcus Lamb; Seán T. Ó Meallaigh
- Cinematography: Damien Elliott
- Edited by: Sorcha Nic Giolla Mhuire
- Music by: Daithí Ó Drónaí
- Release dates: 12 February 2025 (Santa Barbara); 13 February 2026 (Ireland)
- Running time: 91 minutes
- Country: Ireland
- Language: Irish

Aontas ((Irish pronunciation: [ˈeːn̪ˠt̪ˠəsˠ], meaning "unity" or "union") is a 2025 Irish language thriller film directed by Damian McCann, co-written with Sarah Gordon. It stars Carrie Crowley, Bríd Brennan, Eva-Jane Gaffney, Seán T. Ó Meallaigh, Marcus Lamb, and Art Parkinson.

The film premiered at the 40th Santa Barbara International Film Festival on 12 February 2025 and was theatrically released in Ireland on 13 February 2026. It was also selected as the Irish entry for Best International Feature Film at the 99th Academy Awards.

== Title basis ==
The film's title has a double meaning: Through united actions, the film's leading female characters discover hidden truths about themselves and each other; and AONTAS is also the name of Ireland’s National Adult Learning Organisation, where it serves as a backronym for Aos Oideachais Náisiúnta Trí Aontú Saorálach ("national adult education through voluntary unification").

== Synopsis ==
Three unlikely thieves, led by a woman on the verge of a breakdown, rob a rural Irish Credit Union. Opening in the tragic aftermath of the heist-gone-wrong, the story uses reverse chronology to unravel the events that led to this point. What starts as a poorly executed robbery becomes a portrait of a wilful woman trapped in her own past, amidst a collapsing business community largely dependent on Credit Union loans for its survival.

== Cast ==
- Carrie Crowley as Mairéad
- Bríd Brennan as Cáit
- Eva-Jane Gaffney as Sheila
- Art Parkinson as Éamonn
- Seán T. Ó Meallaigh as Colly
- Marcus Lamb as Dara
- Mary Ryan as Mary
- Christopher Grant as Caoimhín
- Frankie McCafferty as Len
- Naseen Morgan as Elma

== Reception ==
Andy Howell of Film Threat praised the film, stating "this is a wonder of construction and character revelation from the writing to the direction, editing, and acting". Alan Zilberman of the Washington City Paper was impressed by how the "backwards screenplay" circumvented risks through "sharp attention to detail". Sarah Manvel of Movies We Texted About applauded Damien McCann and Sarah Gordon for being "clearly just as strongly determined to modernise Irish-language cinema as rap group Kneecap".

Fionnuala Halligan of Screen Daily credited the performances of the main trio (Carrie Crowley, Bríd Brennan, and Eva-Jane Gaffney) for "turning it into a small-scale crowd-pleaser". Emma Badame of That Shelf lauded their performances as well, calling them each "a masterclass". David Roy of The Irish News commended the composer Daithí Ó Drónaí for his "brooding, atmospheric electronic score".

Amylou Ahava of Daily Grindhouse compared it to Memento (2000) and Irréversible (2002), stating what renders it "exceptional is how it takes a classic crime genre and reinvents it with a deeply personal, character-driven approach". And Emma Metzger-Stewart of SLO Review commented "you'll leave the theater wanting to talk about it".

== See also ==
- List of Academy Award winners and nominees from Ireland
- List of Irish submissions for the Academy Award for Best International Feature Film
- List of submissions to the 99th Academy Awards for Best International Feature Film
