= Carolyn Bracken =

Irish actor

- Born: c. 1982
- Occupation: Actor
- Years active: 2019–present

Carolyn Bracken is an Irish actress.

== Early life ==
Bracken grew up in Nenagh, County Tipperary. She began acting at age four, as a member of local theater group The Nenagh Players. She also began attending speech and drama classes around the same time.

She graduated from the Gaiety School of Acting in Dublin.

== Career ==
Bracken pursued being an actor in her early 30s.

== Filmography ==
=== Films ===
Year	Film	Role	Notes	Ref
2021	You Are Not My Mother	Angela Delaney		
2022	The Quiet Girl	The Woman		
2024	Oddity	Dani Odello-Timmis / Darcy Odello		

=== Television series ===
Year	Series	Role	Notes	Ref
	Balor Hall			
2019	Dublin Murders	Sandra Sculley		
	Smother	Sandra Dillon		
2023	The Gone	Aileen Ryan		
