= Galway Film Fleadh =

Annual Irish film festival

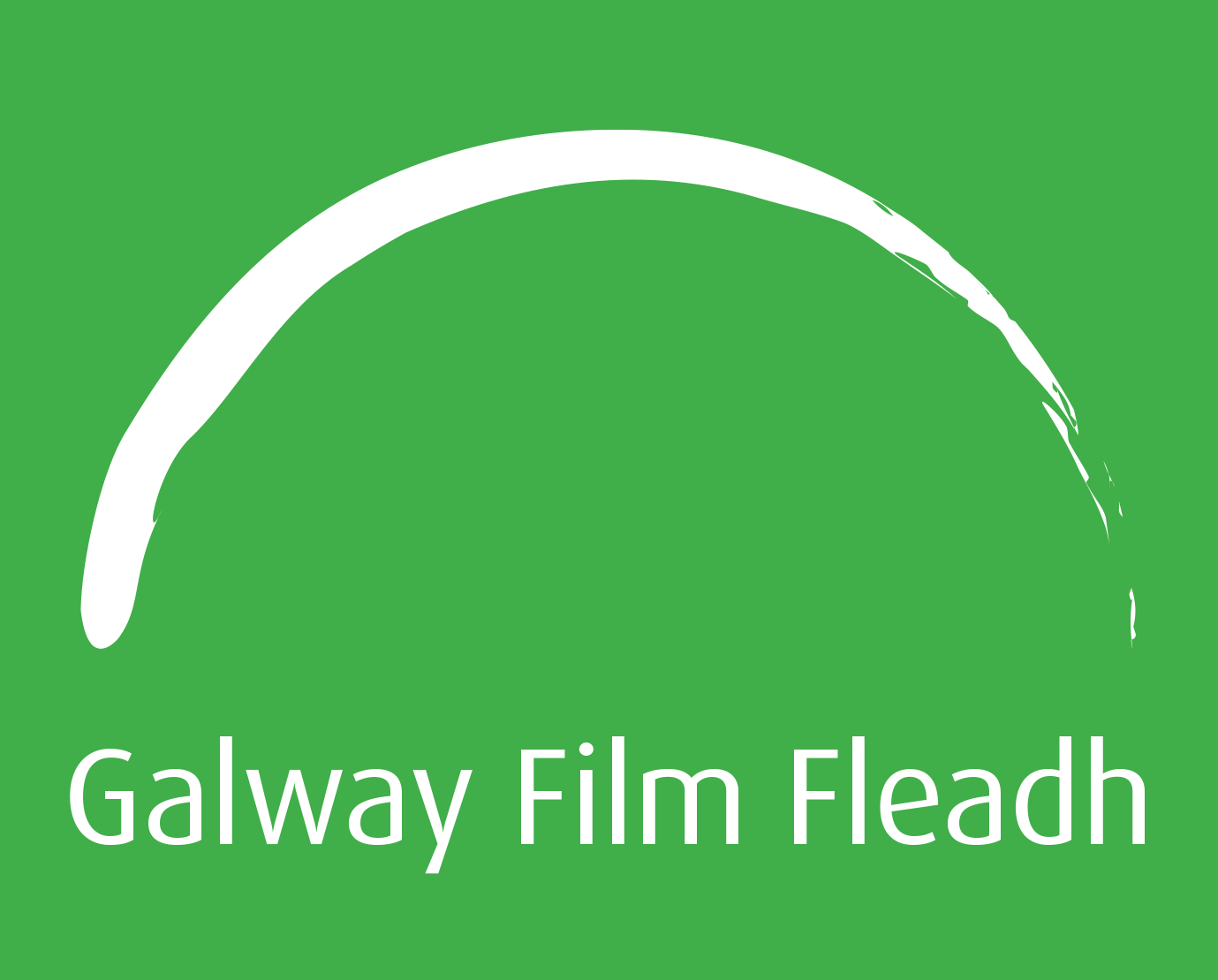
- Location: Galway, Ireland
- Founded: 1989
- Most recent: 2025
- Festival date: 8–13 July 2025
- Language: English, Irish, others
- Website: galwayfilmfleadh.com

The Galway Film Fleadh (pronounced [fʲlʲaː]; Irish for "festival") is an international film festival founded in 1989 as part of the Galway Arts Festival. Describing itself as Ireland’s leading film festival, the event is held every July in Galway, Ireland.

In 2022, a MovieMaker magazine panel of U.S. filmmakers, critics and industry executives included the festival on its list of the "50 Film Festivals Worth the Entry Fee".

== Background ==
The festival was founded in 1989, as part of the Galway Arts Festival and was held at the Claddagh Palace until that venue closed in 1995. The festival has become known as a venue for the premiere of domestic Irish films, but as an international festival, it also exhibits foreign film works.

The festival includes the Galway Film Fair, a focused film market which allows filmmakers with projects in development to meet with a large number of potential producers, financiers, and distributors.

In 2006, the Galway Film Fleadh was the site of the first screening of John Carney's film Once.

Since 1995, the organisers have also conducted the Junior Film Fleadh, held in November and oriented to youth films and student audiences. This has since been renamed Generation Fleadh and generally caters for young people aged 12-24.

== Festival editions ==
The 35th edition was held in July 2023. The festival featured the world premiere of The Martini Shot, a drama film written and directed by Stephen Wallis and starring Matthew Modine, John Cleese, Derek Jacobi, Stuart Townsend and Fiona Glascott.

The 37th edition, held from 8 July to 13 July 2025, featured 31 world premieres, 11 international/European premieres and 46 Irish premieres from 44 countries, featuring 96 feature films in total. It closed with the screening of The Life of Chuck, by Mike Flanagan. The Best International Feature Film award was won by Dragonfly by Paul Andrew Williams and Best International Documentary by Gerry Adams – A Ballymurphy Man by Trisha Ziff. The Best International Short Documentary was won ex aequo by Christophere Radcliff's We Were the Scenery with The Miracle of Life. The Best Irish Film award was given to Christy by Brendan Canty.

The 38th Galway Film Fleadh, held in July 2026, also featured a programme of new Irish and international feature films, including the world premieres of Irish films The Lost Children of Tuam, You'll Never Believe Who's Dead, Faraway Home and Our House. The 2026 "Best International Documentary Award" was awarded to Brace For Oblivion by Xackery Irving.
