= 17th Irish Film & Television Awards =

Annual Irish media awards ceremony

- Date: 4 July 2021
- Site: Virtual ceremony
- Hosted by: Gráinne Seoige

Highlights
- Best Film: Wolfwalkers
- Best Direction: Cathy Brady; Wildfire
- Best Actor: Gabriel Byrne; Death of a Ladies' Man
- Best Actress: Nika McGuigan; Wildfire
- Most awards: Normal People (9)
- Most nominations: Normal People (15)

Television coverage
- Channel: Virgin Media One

The 17th Irish Film & Television Academy Awards took place in July 2021. The ceremony honoured Irish films and television drama released between 1 February 2020 and 31 May 2021.

The nominees were announced on 15 June 2021. Normal People received an unprecedented fifteen nominations. At the ceremony in July 2021, Normal People won nine prizes.

== Film ==
=== Best film ===
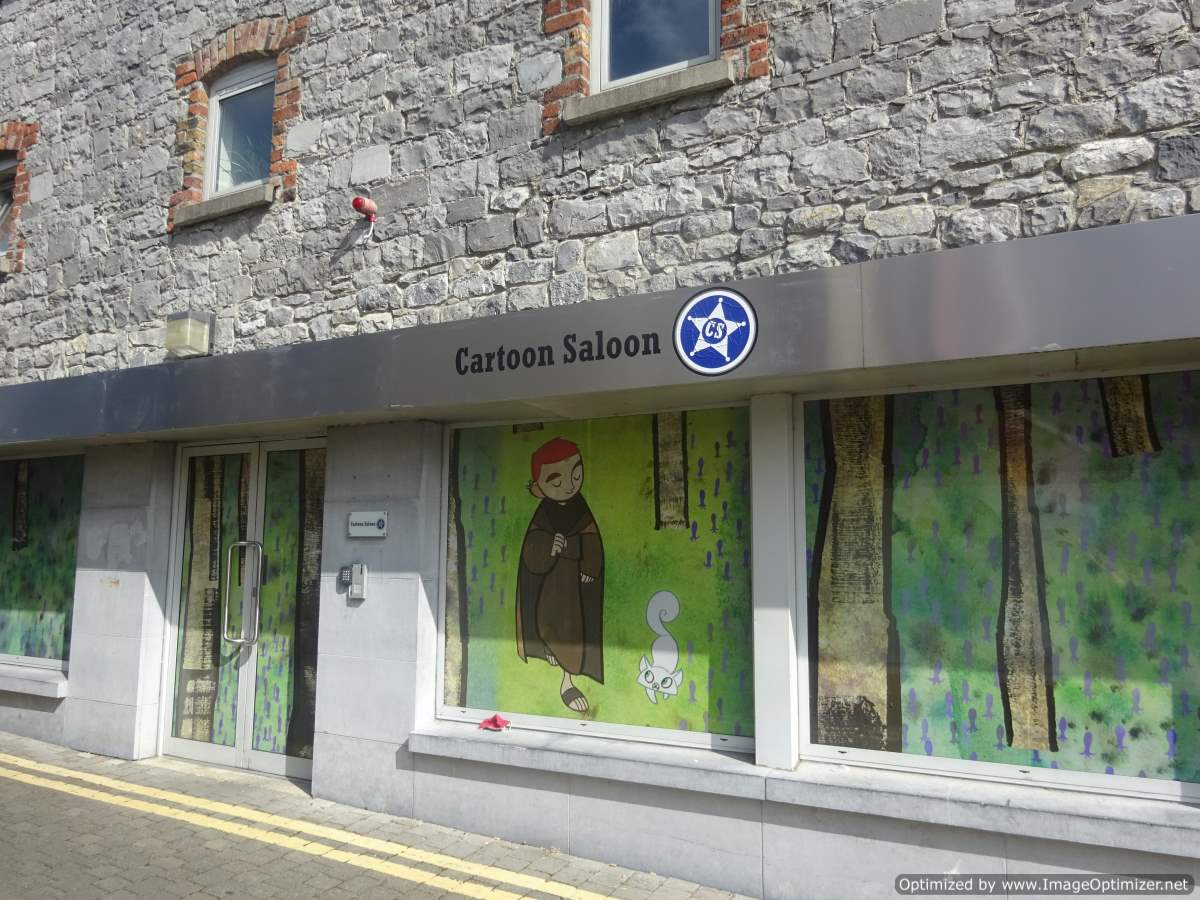
Offices of Cartoon Saloon, creators of Best Film winner Wolfwalkers

- Broken Law
- Dating Amber
- Herself
- Vivarium
- Wildfire
- Wolfwalkers (winner)

=== Director ===
- Cathy Brady – Wildfire (winner)
- David Freyne – Dating Amber
- Lorcan Finnegan – Vivarium
- Paddy Slattery – Broken Law
- Tomm Moore and Ross Stewart – Wolfwalkers

=== Script ===
- Cathy Brady – Wildfire
- Clare Dunne and Malcolm Campbell – Herself (winner)
- David Freyne – Dating Amber
- Paddy Slattery – Broken Law
- Will Collins – Wolfwalkers

=== Actress in a leading role ===
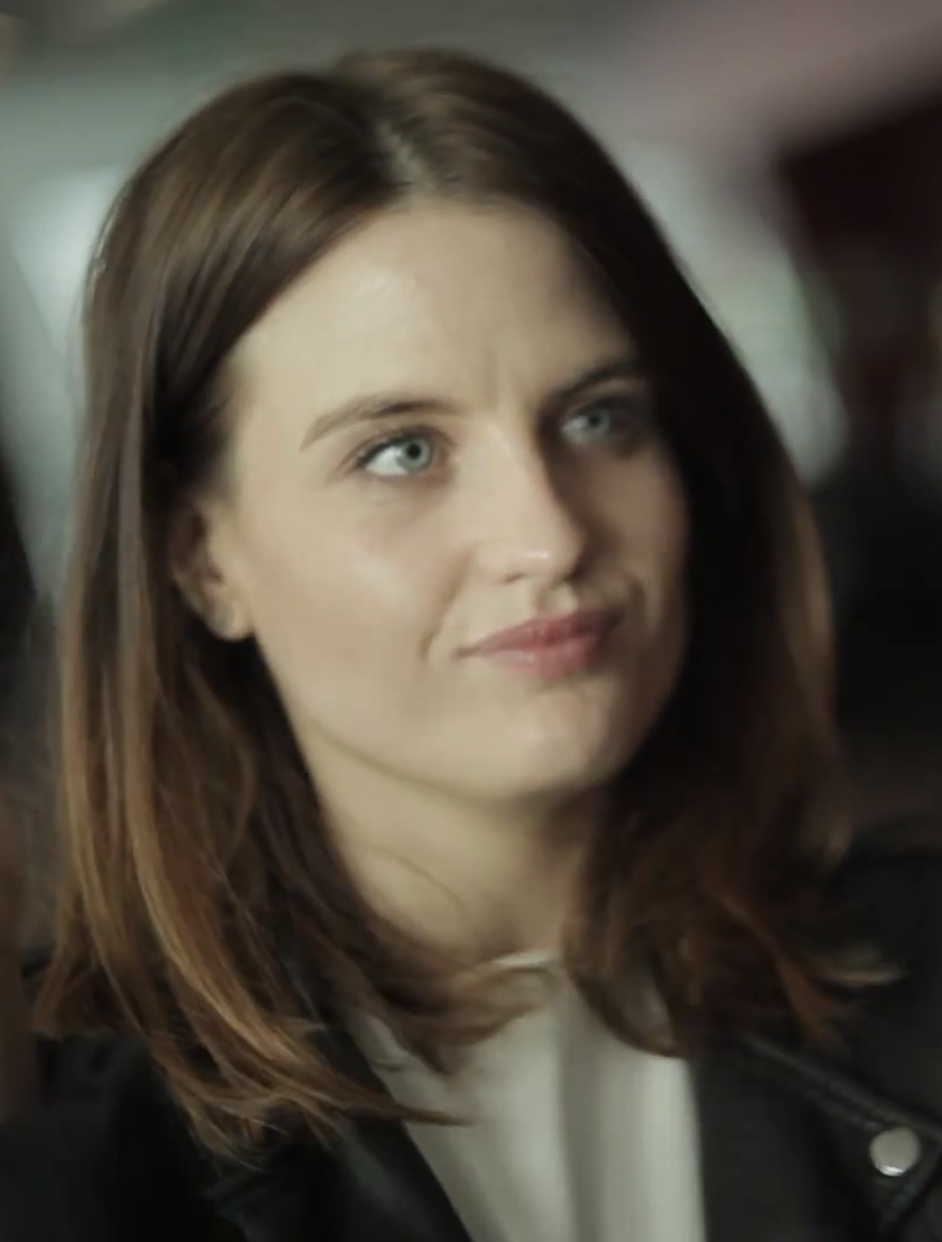
Nika McGuigan, Best Actress IFTA winner

- Jessie Buckley – I'm Thinking of Ending Things
- Clare Dunne – Herself
- Lola Petticrew – Dating Amber
- Nika McGuigan – Wildfire (posthumous) (winner)
- Nora-Jane Noone – Wildfire

=== Actor in a leading role ===
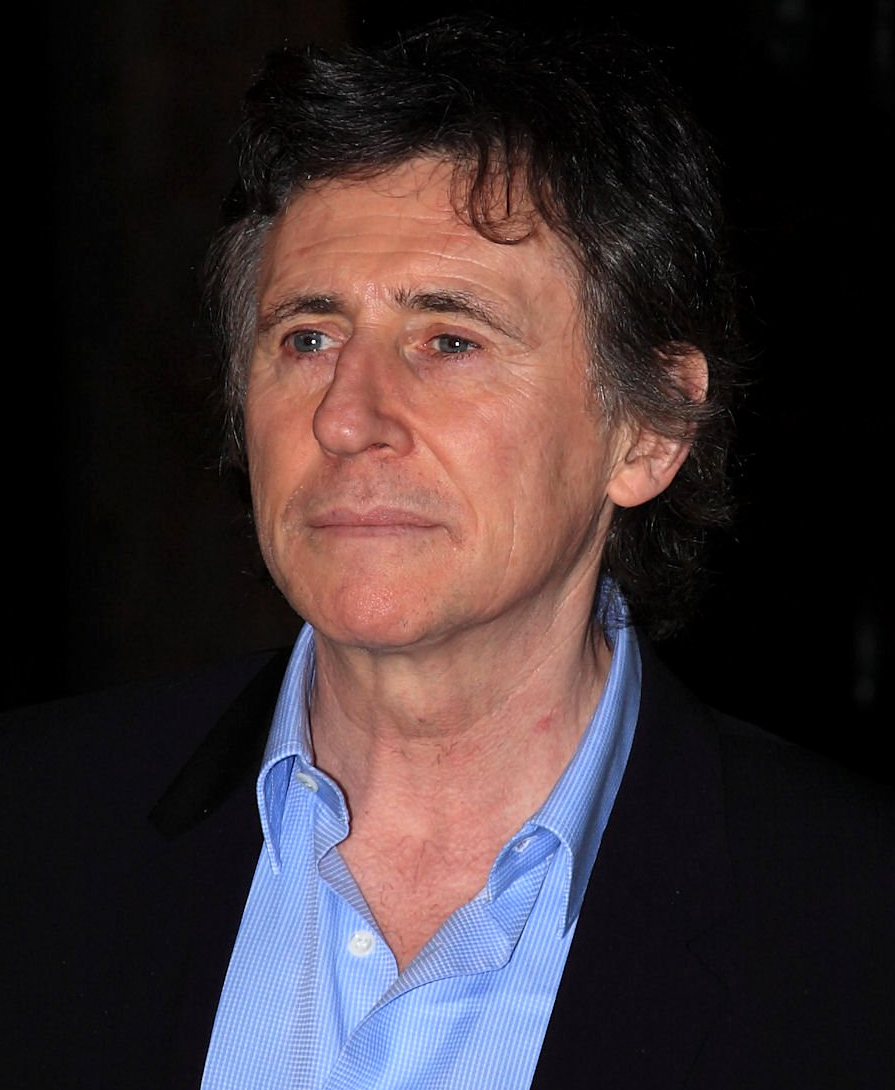
Gabriel Byrne, Best Actor IFTA winner

- Ciarán Hinds – The Man In The Hat
- Fionn O'Shea – Dating Amber
- Gabriel Byrne – Death of a Ladies' Man (winner)
- Moe Dunford – Knuckledust
- Tristan Heanue – Broken Law

=== Actress in a supporting role ===
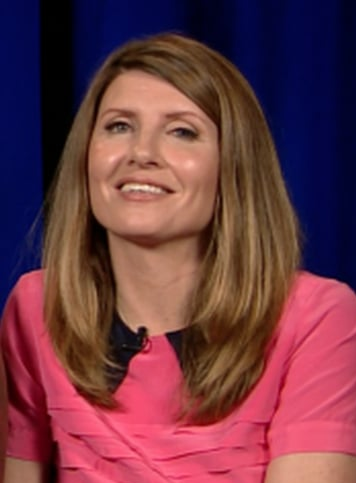
Sharon Horgan, Best Supporting Actress IFTA winner

- Ally Ní Charáin – Broken Law
- Kathy Kiera Clarke – A Bend in the River
- Molly McCann – Herself
- Saoirse Ronan – Ammonite
- Sharon Horgan – Dating Amber (winner)

=== Actor in a supporting role ===
- Barry Ward – Dating Amber (winner)
- Brian Gleeson – Death of a Ladies' Man
- Colm Meaney – Pixie
- Conleth Hill – Herself
- Ned Dennehy – Undergods

=== George Morrison Feature Documentary ===
- Breaking Out (winner)
- Finding Jack Charlton
- Henry Glassie: Field Work
- Phil Lynott: Songs for While I'm Away
- The 8th
- Tomorrow is Saturday

=== Short film – Live action ===
- Five Letters to the Stranger Who Will Dissect My Brain
- Flicker
- Kathleen Was Here
- My Other Suit Is Human
- Rough (winner)
- The Invisible Boy

=== Animated short ===
- Gunter Falls in Love
- Her Song (winner)
- The Dead Hands of Dublin
- The Voyage
- Zog and the Flying Doctors

=== Rising Star Award ===
- Nicola Coughlan (Actor — Bridgerton)
  - Cathy Brady (Director/Writer — Wildfire)
  - Clare Dunne (Actor/Writer — Herself)
  - Eve Hewson (Actor — Behind Her Eyes)
  - Paddy Slattery (Director/Producer/Writer — Broken Law)

== Television drama ==
=== Drama ===
- Blood, series 2 (Channel 5 / Virgin Media One)
- Line of Duty, series 6 (BBC One)
- Normal People (RTÉ One / BBC Three) (winner)
- Dead Still (Acorn TV)
- Smother (RTÉ One)
- Vikings, series 6 (History [Canada])

=== Director ===
- Dearbhla Walsh – Fargo
- Dathaí Keane – Smother
- Imogen Murphy – Dead Still
- Lenny Abrahamson – Normal People (winner)
- Steve St. Leger – Vikings

=== Script ===
- Adam Patterson and Declan Lawn – The Salisbury Poisonings
- Kate O'Riordan – Smother
- Lisa McGee – The Deceived
- John Morton – Dead Still
- Sally Rooney – Normal People (winner)

=== Actress in a leading role ===
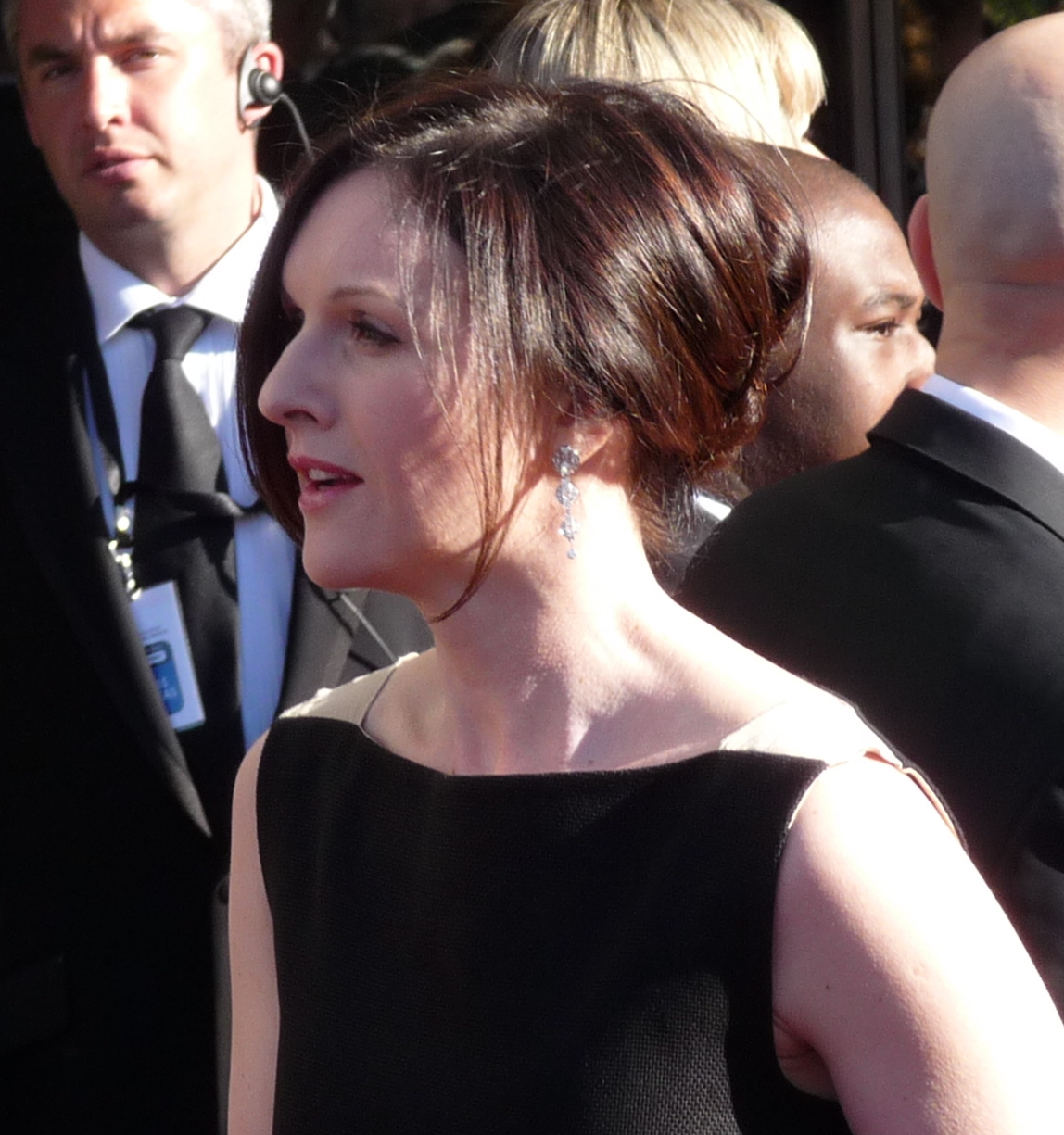
Dervla Kirwan, who won an IFTA for Best Actress (TV Drama)

- Niamh Algar – Raised by Wolves
- Aisling Franciosi – Black Narcissus
- Dervla Kirwan – Smother (winner)
- Eve Hewson – Behind Her Eyes
- Catherine Walker – The Deceived

=== Actor in a leading role ===
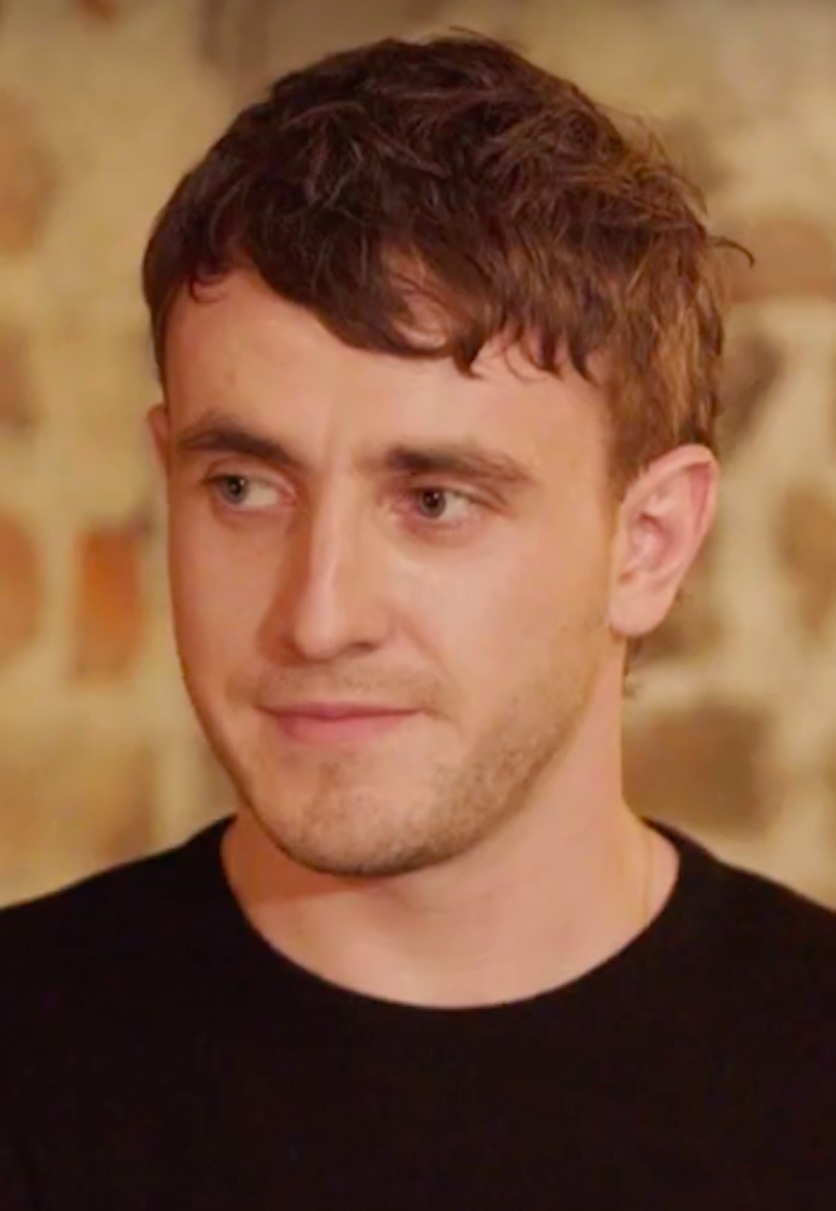
Paul Mescal, who won an IFTA for Best Actor (TV Drama)

- Adrian Dunbar – Line of Duty
- James Nesbitt – Bloodlands
- Brendan Gleeson – The Comey Rule
- Michael Smiley – Dead Still
- Paul Mescal – Normal People (winner)

=== Actress in a supporting role ===
- Fiona Shaw – Killing Eve
- Gemma-Leah Devereux – Smother
- Nicola Coughlan – Bridgerton
- Sarah Greene – Normal People (winner)
- Seána Kerslake – Smother

=== Actor in a supporting role ===
- Andrew Scott – His Dark Materials
- Colm Meaney – Gangs of London
- Desmond Eastwood – Normal People
- Éanna Hardwicke – Smother
- Fionn O'Shea – Normal People (winner)

== Craft ==
=== Score ===
- Aza Hand – Son (winner)
- Colm Mac Con Iomaire – A Bend in the River
- John McPhillips – Smother
- Stephen Rennicks – Normal People
- Ray Harman – Blood

=== Editing ===
- Colin Campbell – Here are the Young Men
- Gráinne Gavigan – Dead Still
- Nathan Nugent – Normal People
- Tony Cranstoun – Vivarium
- Úna Ní Dhonghaíle – Misbehaviour (winner)

=== Production Design ===
- John Leslie – Son
- Lucy van Lonkhuyzen – Normal People (winner)
- Philip Murphy – Vivarium
- Ray Ball – Sea Fever
- Tamara Conboy – Herself

=== Cinematography ===
- Cathal Watters – Smother
- Ciaran Tanham – Dead Still
- James Mather – Here are the Young Men
- Kate McCullough – Normal People (winner)
- Suzie Lavelle – Normal People

=== Costume ===
- Aisling Wallace Byrne – Here are the Young Men
- Joan O'Clery – Dating Amber
- Leonie Prendergast – Gretel & Hansel (winner)
- Lorna Marie Mugan – Normal People
- Triona Lillis – Smother

=== Makeup & Hair ===
- Jennie Readman and Niamh O'Loan – Vivarium
- Linda Gannon Foster and Jennifer Hegarty – Dead Still
- Linda Gannon Foster and Liz Byrne – Gretel & Hansel (winner)
- Sandra Kelly and Sharon Doyle – Normal People
- Siobhan Harper-Ryan – I Hate Suzie

=== Sound Design ===
- Aza Hand and Patrick Drummond – Son
- Hugh Fox, Fionán Higgins & Mark Henry – Smother
- Kieran Horgan & Brendan Rehill – Phil Lynott: Songs for While I'm Away
- Patrick Drummond, Aza Hand, Katie O'Mahony & Adrian Conway – Here are the Young Men
- Steve Fanagan, Niall Brady & Niall O Sullivan – Normal People (winner)

=== VFX ===
- Jim O’Hagan and Ed Bruce – WandaVision
- Ed Bruce – Shadow and Bone
- Ed Bruce – Kidding (winner)
