= My Sailor, My Love =

- Theatrical release poster
- Directed by: Klaus Härö
- Written by: Jimmy Karlsson; Kirsi Vikman
- Produced by: Kaarle Aho; David Collins; Kai Nordberg
- Starring: James Cosmo; Bríd Brennan; Catherine Walker; Nora-Jane Noone; Aidan O’Hare; Gina Costigan; Molly McCann
- Cinematography: Robert Nordström
- Edited by: Philippe Ravoet
- Music by: Michelino Bisceglia
- Production companies: Nordisk Film; Making Movies Oy; WRAP Fund; Samson Films
- Distributed by: Music Box Films
- Release dates: 9 September 2022 (Canada); 30 September 2022 (Finland); 10 March 2023 (Ireland)
- Running time: 103 minutes
- Countries: Ireland, Finland
- Language: English
- Box office: $297,429

My Sailor, My Love is a 2022 Irish drama film directed by Klaus Härö. An international co-production between Finland and Ireland, the project marked Härö's English language debut. The film premiered at the Toronto International Film Festival, and was subsequently distributed by Music Box Films. The cast includes James Cosmo, Bríd Brennan, Catherine Walker, Nora-Jane Noone, Aidan O’Hare, Gina Costigan, and Molly McCann.

The film was nominated for the 2023 Dublin Film Critics Circle Award for Best Irish Film. For his performance James Cosmo was nominated for the BAFTA Scotland Award for Best Actor. Bríd Brennan and Catherine Walker received nominations from the Irish Film & Television Academy for Best Actress and Best Supporting Actress, respectively.

== Cast ==
- James Cosmo as Howard
- Bríd Brennan as Annie
- Catherine Walker as Grace
- Nora-Jane Noone as Kelly
- Aidan O’Hare as Martin
- Gina Costigan as Joyce
- Molly McCann as Alison

== Reception ==
The film received generally positive reviews. On the review aggregator website Rotten Tomatoes, the film holds an approval rating of 90% based on 30 reviews.

Critics have praised the film's nuanced portrayal of familial relationships. Marya E. Gates of RogerEbert.com noted that the film excels when delving into Grace's pain, highlighting how it has affected her interactions with others. Similarly, Loud and Clear Reviews commended the film for subtly shifting audience perceptions of its characters, particularly in exploring the complexities of Grace and Howard's relationship.

Amy Nicholson in a review for The New York Times was more critical, noting "The painful dynamic is credible; the dialogue not so much. Still, the actors are in full command of our empathy, especially Brennan's gray-haired caretaker who, when she cracks open her heart, seems to glow from within."

== Awards ==
Year	Association	Category	Nominee	Result	Ref.
2022	Chicago International Film Festival	Audience Choice Award	Klaus Härö	Won	
2023	Wisconsin Film Festival	Audience Award	Klaus Härö	Won	
2023	Cleveland International Film Festival	Best Feature Film	Klaus Härö	Won	
2023	Nantucket Film Festival	Best Narrative Feature	Klaus Härö	Won	
2023	World Soundtrack Awards	Public Choice Award	Michelino Bisceglia	Nominated	
2023	Jussi Awards	Best Film	Klaus Härö	Nominated	
2023	Jussi Awards	Best Direction	Klaus Härö	Nominated	
2023	Jussi Awards	Best Production Design	John Hand	Nominated	
2023	Dublin Film Critics Circle Award	Best Irish Film	Klaus Härö	Nominated	
2023	British Academy Scotland Awards	Best Actor	James Cosmo	Nominated	
2024	Irish Film & Television Academy	Best Actress	Bríd Brennan	Nominated	
2024	Irish Film & Television Academy	Best Supporting Actress	Catherine Walker	Nominated	
