= Stefanie Preissner =

Irish writer and actress (born 1987)

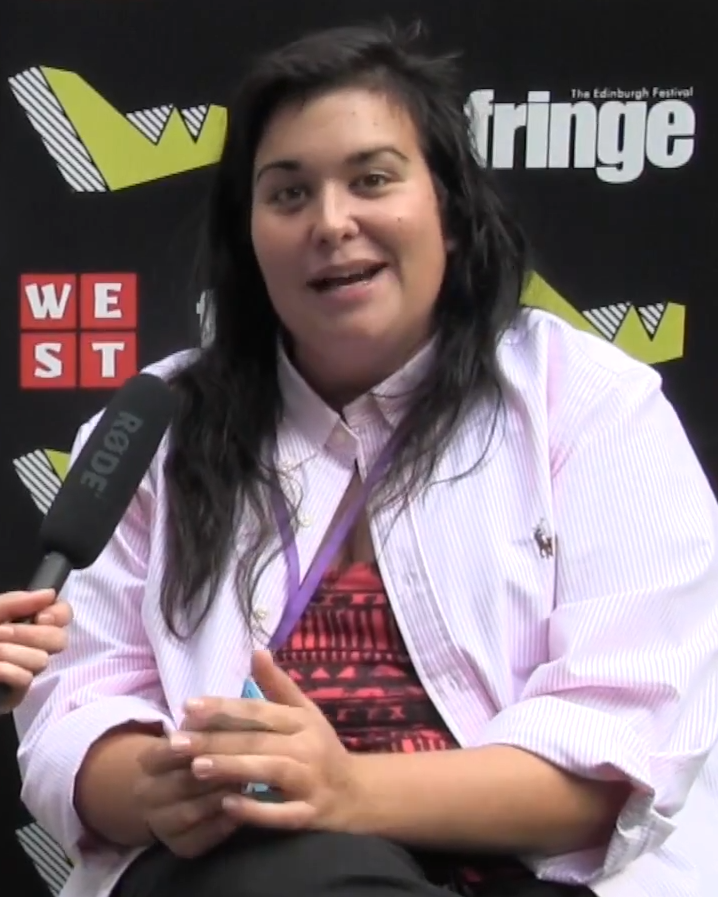
- Preissner in 2013
- Born: 21 April 1987 (age 39); Munich, West Germany
- Education: University College Cork
- Occupation: Writer
- Known for: Can't Cope, Won't Cope
- Spouse: Noel Byrne
- Children: 2

Stefanie Preissner (born 21 April 1987) is an Irish writer, actress, script supervisor and columnist.

She is best known as the creator of comedy-drama Can't Cope, Won't Cope.

== Early life ==
An only child born in Munich, West Germany, Preissner moved to Mallow, County Cork with her mother, Bernie, from Dublin after she had separated from her husband, Stefanie's German father. She gained a BA in Spanish and drama and theatre studies from University College Cork. She attended the Garda Síochána College in Templemore, County Tipperary for a short period on work experience. She attended the Gaiety School of Acting in Dublin in 2008.

== Career ==
Preissner's first acting role was in Enda Walsh's Chatroom.

Preissner wrote and starred in Our Father and Solpadeine is my Boyfriend a one-woman show for the Dublin Fringe Festival, and she toured it internationally. The show was recreated for RTÉ Radio Drama on One. The podcast of this version is the most downloaded of all podcasts from RTÉ. Preissner created a series of documentaries entitled How To Adult for the RTÉ Player.

Preissner's first book Why can't everything just stay the same? : and other things I shout when I can't cope is a collection of poetry and prose. It was published in 2017. Her second book Can I Say No?: One Woman's Battle with a Small Word was published in 2019.

In 2017, Preissner was developing a screenplay closerthanthis (sic) for Brooklyn producers Parallel Films. She was also developing a TV pilot with Channel 4.

In 2020, Preissner started a podcast called "Basically" from HeadStuff Podcast Network.

In 2024, Preissner is credited as a writer on TV Series Faithless and the upcoming The Walsh Sisters based on the novels by Marian Keyes. Preissner is also playing the role of Maggie in the series.

=== Can't Cope, Won't Cope ===
Preissner created RTÉ2's Can't Cope, Won't Cope starring Seána Kerslake, Danika McGuigan and Amy Huberman in 2016. The first season was picked up by BBC 3 in 2017 and Netflix in the US and UK in 2018. A second series was commissioned in 2017.

== Personal life ==
In October 2021, Preissner revealed that she was diagnosed with autism in 2021. She is married to Noel Byrne, and has two children.
