= Molly McCann (actress) =

Irish actress (born

- Occupation: Actress
- Years active: 2018–present

Molly McCann is an Irish child actor. Her film credits include The Hunger Games: Sunrise on the Reaping (2026). For her role in Herself (2020) she was nominated for Best Supporting Actress at the Irish Film & Television Awards.

== Early and personal life ==
From Maynooth in County Kildare and later based in Dublin, both McCann's parents are actors and her mother runs a stage school.

== Career ==
McCann appeared in Irish drama Rosie (2018) and science-fiction film Vivarium (2019). For her role in the film Herself (2020), in which she appeared alongside Claire Dunne and Harriet Walter, McCann was nominated at the 17th Irish Film & Television Awards (IFTA) for Best Supporting Actress at the age of 12 years-old. She later appeared in Irish drama films My Sailor, My Love (2022) and Kathleen Is Here (2024), as American action comedy film Freelance (2023).

McCann's television credits include The Holiday and Cold Courage, as well as Apple TV+ series Bad Sisters, British historical drama The Hardacres and Irish drama series The Boy That Never Was.

McCann plays Louella McCoy, one of the female tributes from District 12 in The Hunger Games: Sunrise on the Reaping (2026), having auditioned for the role in early 2025.

== Partial filmography ==
Key
†	Denotes works that have not yet been released

Year	Title	Role	Notes
2018	Rosie	Madison	
2019	Vivarium	Molly	
2020	Herself	Molly	
2020	Cold Courage	Charlotte	1 episode
2022	The Holiday	Odette	4 episodes
2022	My Sailor, My Love	Alison	
2022	Maxine	Milly Farmer	2 episodes
2023	Freelance	Casey	
2023	The Vanishing Triangle	Young Lisa	3 episodes
2024	Kathleen Is Here	Young Kathleen	
2024	The Boy That Never Was	Eliska	1 episode
2024	The Hardacres	Nellie	1 episode
2024	Bad Sisters	Young Becka	1 episode
2026	The Hunger Games: Sunrise on the Reaping	Louella	
TBA	The Butler†	Harriet	
