= Liam O'Brien (Irish actor) =

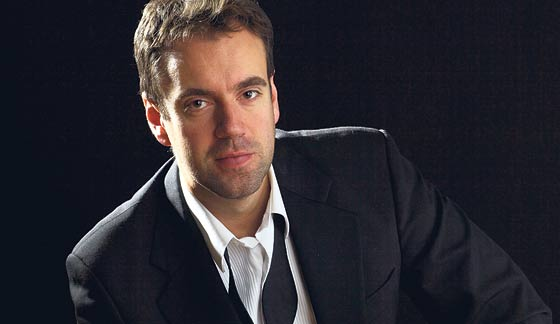
- Born: Liam O'Brien; 11 January 1980 (age 46); Limerick, County Limerick, Ireland
- Occupations: Actor, singer
- Years active: 1995–present

Liam O'Brien (born 11 January 1980) is an Irish actor, most notable for his three years playing Ethan Blake on ITV's long-running soap Emmerdale.

Born in Limerick, O'Brien founded Bottom Dog Theatre Company in 2008 with Myles Breen. Following his role in Emmerdale, he joined the cast of Fair City as Paul Brennans estranged brother Peter. In 2004, he appeared Celebrity Stars in Their Eyes.

In the late Nineties and up to 2007, he worked and toured extensively with Limerick's Island Theatre Company with productions including Borrowed Robes, The Trickster, Our Town, The Taming of the Shrew, Mike Finn’s award-winning Pigtown and playing The Gentleman Caller in The Glass Menagerie. He also appeared in Amalgamotion Theatre Company’s Irish tour of Walking Away. Dublin Theatre roles include Paris in Romeo and Juliet, Cary Grant in Come Up and See Me Sometime.

O'Brien holds a strong connection with crooning. He played Dean Martin for over two years in the West End tour of The Rat Pack: Live From Las Vegas in the UK, Europe and US. He regularly performs in the Savoy, Limerick.

== Filmography ==
Year	Title	Character	Type
1995	Edward No-Hands	Edward Hennessy	TV Movie
2003-2004	The Fairytaler	Voice Actor (English Version)	TV Series
2004	Lilly the Witch	Prince Zac/Princess/Urg (Voice)	TV Series
2004	Stars in Their Eyes	Self-Dr. Hook	TV Series
2004	The Good Soap Guide	Self	TV Series
2004	GMTV	Self	TV Series
2005	Ireland AM	Self	TV Series
2005	The Afternoon Show	Self	TV Series
2004-2005	This Morning	Self	TV Series
2003-2006	Emmerdale	Ethan Blake	TV Series
2007	Killinaskully	Mysterious Stranger	TV Series
2008	Fair City	Peter Brennan	TV Series
2010	Mattie	Posh Auctioneer	TV Series
2012	Harvey: The Monster Catcher	Dean Clancy	Short
2012	4Funnies	Doctor	TV Series
2014	The Quiet Hour	Blondie	Feature Film
2014	All Washed Up	Actor	Short
2015	Lost and Found	Reverend Tom	Short
2024	Blackshore	Garda Driver	TV Series
2026	Once Upon a Time in a Cinema	Dickie Wall	Feature Film
