= Dead Still =

Irish-Canadian television drama series

- Genre: Crime; Mystery; Period drama
- Written by: John Morton
- Story by: John Morton; Imogen Murphy
- Directed by: Imogen Murphy; Craig David Wallace
- Countries of origin: Ireland; Canada
- No. of seasons: 1
- No. of episodes: 6

Production
- Executive producers: Paul Donovan; Christina Jennings
- Production companies: Deadpan Pictures; Shaftesbury Films; Acorn Media Enterprises; ZDF Enterprises

Original release
- Network: Acorn TV; Citytv
- Release: May 15 – June 15, 2020

Dead Still is a six-part Irish-Canadian television drama series, which premiered on May 18, 2020 on Acorn TV and May 15, 2020 Citytv. The series is a co-production between Ireland's Deadpan Pictures and Canada's Shaftesbury Films and is written by John Morton, from a story by John Morton and Imogen Murphy, and directed by Imogen Murphy and Craig David Wallace.

In 2021 Dead Still was nominated for 7 IFTAs at the 17th Irish Film & Television Awards, including Best Drama and Best Director.

In 2021, Dead Still writer John Morton won the Edgar Allan Poe Award for Best Episode in a TV Series.

== Premise ==
Dead Still follows Brock Blennerhasset, a well regarded photographer in 1880s Ireland who specialises in memorial portraiture – photographing the recently deceased – as he is drawn into a series of murders which appear to be linked to his work.

== Cast ==
- Michael Smiley as Brock Blennerhasset
- Aidan O'Hare as Frederick Regan, an officer of the D.M.P.
- Eileen O'Higgins as Nancy Vickers, Brock's niece and an aspiring actress
- Kerr Logan as Conall Malloy, a gravedigger and Brock's assistant
- Jimmy Smallhorne as Cecil Carruthers
- Mark Rendall as Percy Cummins
- Martin Donovan as Bushrod Whacker
- Aoife Duffin as Betty Regan
- Peter Campion as Henry Vickers
- Rhys Dunlop as Ronnie Roper
- Fiona Bell as Abigail Vickers
- Gemma-Leah Devereux as Hanna Dubby
- Patrick FitzSymons as William Glendinning
- Jordanne Jones as Lily Molloy
- Laura Murray as Eva Lambert / The Ghost Queen
- Mary Murray as Aline Lambert
- Lynn Rafferty as Bessie Bulger
- Shane Lennon as Harry Farrelly
- John Morton as Ossie Burke
- Natalia Cooper as Vicenta

== Episodes ==
No.	Title	Directed by	Written by	Original release date
1	"Photochemistry"	Imogen Murphy	John Morton	May 18, 2020
2	"Development"	Imogen Murphy	John Morton	May 18, 2020
3	"Daguerreotype"	Imogen Murphy	John Morton	May 25, 2020
4	"Camera Obscura"	Craig David Wallace	John Morton	June 1, 2020
5	"Snuff"	Craig David Wallace	John Morton	June 8, 2020
6	"Only Memories Remain"	Imogen Murphy	John Morton	June 15, 2020
