= Here Before (film) =

2021 film by Stacey Gregg

- Theatrical release poster
- Directed by: Stacey Gregg
- Written by: Stacey Gregg
- Produced by: Julia Godzinskaya; Sophie Vickers
- Starring: Andrea Riseborough
- Cinematography: Chloë Thomson
- Edited by: Brian Philip Davis; Nick Emerson
- Music by: Adam Janota Bzowski
- Production companies: Rooks Nest; BBC Film; Pia Pressure; Northern Ireland Screen; Bank Side Films
- Distributed by: Wildcard Distribution
- Release dates: 17 March 2021 (SXSW); 18 February 2022 (Northern Ireland)
- Running time: 83 minutes
- Country: Northern Ireland (UK)
- Language: English

Here Before is a 2021 Northern Irish psychological thriller film written and directed by Stacey Gregg in her feature directorial debut. It stars Andrea Riseborough, Jonjo O'Neill, Martin McCann, and Eileen O'Higgins.

The film was nominated to compete in the Narrative Feature Category at the 2021 SXSW Film Festival.

The film had its world premiere at South by Southwest on 17 March 2021, and was released theatrically in Ireland and Britain on 18 February 2022 by Wildcard Distribution. It received positive reviews from critics, with Riseborough's performance being singled out for praise.

== Plot ==
Laura lives in Northern Ireland with her husband Brendan and her son Tadhg. Her daughter Josie was killed in a car accident several years prior to the events of the film, with Brendan driving.

A girl named Megan moves next door to Laura with her parents, Marie and Chris. Megan and Laura soon strike up a friendship. Laura becomes intrigued when Megan says that she has studied at the local school before and visited the local graveyard, and requests that Laura make a smiley face with ketchup when she invites Megan for dinner. Marie says that Megan has never studied at the school before or seen the graveyard.

One day, Laura takes Megan to the nearby playground at her request. Megan says that she visited the park before; Laura angrily takes her home. Marie asks Laura to refrain from giving Megan any further rides home. Laura is insulted; tension escalates, and Marie warns her to stay away from Megan. Brendan decides that the family should leave town for a few days to give Laura a chance to relax. While looking through Brendan's phone, Laura finds several photos of Megan on it.

After they return home, Laura abducts Megan before school, and takes her and Tadhg on a drive along Ballyfield Road—the road Brendan was driving on when the accident occurred. Megan says that Brendan was singing while driving along the road, which convinces Laura that Josie was reincarnated as Megan. An upset Tadhg attacks Megan in her home that night, which results in the police being summoned. Laura continues having nightmares and asks Brendan to stay at his mother's place for a few days to give her some space.

Whilst tidying up Tadgh's bedroom, Laura finds a tin of Josie mementos in his drawer—along with a photo of Brendan with Marie at a party, contradicting his previous claim that he did not know her. Brendan meets with Megan, who has realised that Brendan is her actual father. Laura breaks into Megan's house and finds several photos of Josie and a CD containing a 2007 recording of Josie and Tadhg, matching the same one she discovered in Tadgh's drawer. She confronts Marie upon her arrival home, accusing her of using Megan to take revenge on Brendan. The confrontation turns violent after Laura threatens to have Megan taken away from Marie, culminating with Laura throttling Marie before the latter stabs the former with a shard of glass. Megan arrives in time to apologise to Laura; in a hallucination, Laura briefly sees her as Josie and tells her that she loves her.

The film ends with a fully recovered Laura placing flowers at Josie's grave, declaring, "She's here. She's always been here."

== Cast ==
- Andrea Riseborough as Laura
- Jonjo O'Neill as Brendan
- Martin McCann as Chris
- Eileen O'Higgins as Marie
- Lewis McAskie as Tadhg
- Niamh Dornan as Megan
- Jesse Frazer-Filer as Ian
- Grace O'Dwyer as Josie
- Gina Moxley as Paula
- Chrissy Hindley as Roxanne
- Terence Keeley as Mr O'Riordan
- Tony Flynn as secretary

== Production ==
Here Before is produced by Rooks Nest Entertainment and financed by BBC Films, Pia Pressure and Northern Ireland Screen. Filming took place in and around Belfast, Northern Ireland.

== Release ==
The film had its world premiere at South by Southwest on 17 March 2021. It was released theatrically in the United Kingdom and Ireland on 18 February 2022 by Wildcard Distribution.

== Reception ==
Here Before received positive reviews from critics, with Andrea Riseborough's performance being singled out for praise. On the review aggregator website Rotten Tomatoes, 86% of 74 critics' reviews are positive, with an average rating of 6.5/10. The website's consensus reads: "Resting its slowly twisting tale on a magnetic Andrea Riseborough performance, Here Before is a solidly unsettling effort from debuting writer-director Stacey Gregg." Metacritic, which uses a weighted average, assigned the film a score of 69 out of 100, based on 13 critics, indicating "generally favorable" reviews.

Owen Gleiberman of Variety praised Gregg for "a hugely accessible and transportable technique." Cath Clarke of The Guardian gave the film 3/5 stars, writing: "The question of whether this is a ghost story or if Laura is experiencing a kind of psychological breakdown twists and turns in ways that lost me by the end. Still, it is a very accomplished debut from Gregg, and acted with subtlety and sensitivity by Riseborough." Kevin Maher of The Times also gave the film 3/5 stars, calling it "[an] inventive chiller from debut director Stacey Gregg." Simran Hans of The Observer also gave the film 3/5 stars, writing: "Gregg crafts a spooky atmosphere charged with the supernatural. Riseborough's intensity helps sell the idea of a possible otherworldly presence, but the script is less committed, faltering with a lacklustre ending."

Kate Erbland of IndieWire gave the film a grade of C+. She praised Riseborough's performance, but described the story as "an undercooked story that often pursues the least interesting possibilities." Simon Abrams of RogerEbert.com gave the film 2.5/4 stars, writing: "There's certainly enough craft, soul, and intelligence on display to make Gregg's movie worth a look", but added: "There's also a few too many scenes that only succeed at repeating its evident fascination with grief as a personal and therefore only partly communicable experience."
