= Kathleen Is Here =

Irish drama film

- Directed by: Eva Birthistle
- Screenplay by: Eva Birthistle
- Produced by: Claire McCaughley
- Starring: Hazel Doupe; Clare Dunne; Peter Coonan
- Production company: Treasure Entertainment
- Release date: 2024
- Country: Ireland
- Language: English

Kathleen Is Here is a 2024 Irish film directed by Eva Birthistle and starring Hazel Doupe. It is a follow-up to the 2020 short film Kathleen Was Here. It received seven nominations at the Irish Film and Television Awards.

== Premise ==
Kathleen has aged out of foster care but after her mother dies returns to her hometown to live in her family home.

== Cast ==
- Hazel Doupe as Kathleen
  - Molly McCann as Young Kathleen
- Clare Dunne as Dee
- Peter Coonan as Rory
- Aaron Monaghan as Damian
- Liadán Dunlea as Yvonne
- Toni O'Rourke as Carol

== Production ==
The film is directed by Eva Birthistle in her feature length debut, and is a follow-up to her 10 minute short film Kathleen Was Here from 2020. Birthistle describes the project as a "labour of love" that lasted ten years. It is produced by Claire McCaughley for Treasure Entertainment with backing from Fís Éireann/Screen Ireland.

Principal photography took place in Balbriggan, a coastal town near Dublin.

== Release ==
The film had its world premiere at the Raindance Film Festival in June 2024. The film had a theatrical release in Ireland on 18 October 2024.

== Reception ==
Harry Guerin for RTÉ described it as a "well-told small story that asks a lot of big questions" and among the most compelling domestic offerings of 2024".

It received seven nominations at the Irish Film and Television Awards in January 2025 including Best Film, Best Director and Best Script and acting nominations for Doupe, Dunne and Coonan.
