= Rosie (2018 film) =

Irish drama film

- Film poster
- Directed by: Paddy Breathnach
- Screenplay by: Roddy Doyle
- Starring: Sarah Greene
- Cinematography: Cathal Watters
- Edited by: Úna Ní Dhonghaíle
- Music by: Stephen Rennicks
- Distributed by: Element Pictures
- Release dates: 7 September 2018 (TIFF); 12 October 2018 (Ireland)
- Running time: 86 minutes
- Country: Ireland
- Language: English
- Box office: $66,972

Rosie is a 2018 Irish drama film directed by Paddy Breathnach. It was screened in the Contemporary World Cinema section at the 2018 Toronto International Film Festival.

== Plot ==
Rosie Davis is a mother trying to protect her family after their landlord sells their rented home and they become homeless.

== Cast ==
- Sarah Greene as Rosie Davis
- Moe Dunford as John Paul
- Natalia Kostrzewa as Świetlana
- Ellie O' Halloran as Kayleigh Davis-Brady
- Ruby Dunne as Millie Davis-Brady
- Daragh McKenzie as Alfie Davis-Brady
- Molly McCann as Madison Davis-Brady
- Jade Jordan as Megan
- Pom Boyd as Rosie's Mother

== Development ==
The film is produced by Emma Norton, Rory Gilmartin and Juliette Bonass for Dublin-based firm Element Pictures, best known for Yorgos Lanthimos' The Lobster, John Michael McDonagh's The Guard and Lenny Abrahamson's Room. The project has also been granted financial support from Screen Ireland for both the development and production phases. The overall contribution of the film agency amounts to €625,000.

== Reception ==
On review aggregation website Rotten Tomatoes, the film has a score of 94% based on reviews from 51 critics, with an average rating of 7.9/10. The site's consensus reads: "Equal parts empathy and outrage, Rosie offers a heartbreaking glimpse of economic insecurity that will hit many viewers uncomfortably close to home." On Metacritic it has a score of 83 out of 100, based on reviews from 11 critics, indicating "universal acclaim".

Dennis Harvey of Variety magazine wrote: "This small, tough film provides no easy solutions." Mark Kermode praised the film: "It is vibrant... this is a superwoman performance by somebody in a very down to earth situation."

== Awards ==
In December 2019, the film was awarded with the first prize at the French Film Festival "La pauvreté sans clichés" in Montreuil at its 4th edition. The Festival is organised by the NGO ATD Fourth World and is dedicated to films about poverty and social issues. The members of the jury, people in precarious situations or having experienced precariousness, alongside other members of ATD Fourth World, "recognized themselves in this film, in the courage and dignity of Rosie Davis and her family".
