= India Mullen =

Irish actress

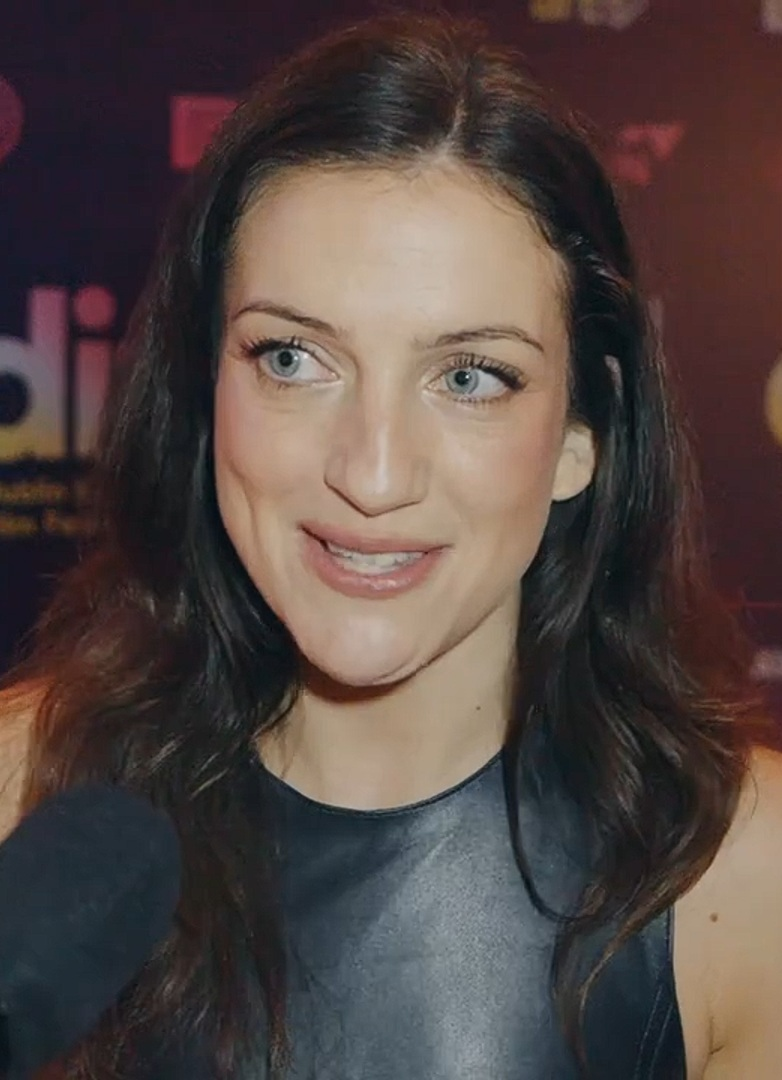
- Mullen at the 2026 Dublin International Film Festival
- Born: 8 November 1993 (age 32)
- Education: Gaiety School of Acting
- Years active: 2014–present

India Mullen (born 8 November 1993) is an Irish actress, artist and photographer. She is known for her roles in the Virgin Media One series Red Rock (2015–2017) and The Vanishing Triangle (2023), the BBC Three and Hulu miniseries Normal People (2020), and the third series of the Sky Max comedy-drama Brassic (2021).

== Early life and education ==
Mullen is from Sandycove, a suburb of Dublin. Her mother is a nurse, her father is an architect, and she has three siblings. Mullen took drama classes at the National Performing Arts School as a child. She attended Holy Child Killiney before going on to train at the Gaiety School of Acting, graduating in 2014.

== Career ==
=== Acting ===
Upon graduating from the Gaiety, Mullen made her television debut in an episode of the Damo and Ivor comedy show before being cast as Katie Kiely in the Virgin Media One crime drama series Red Rock, a main character Mullen played for the first two series from 2015 to 2017. She then had recurring roles as Maryanne in the AMC series Into the Badlands, Sevi in the Syfy series Krypton, and the RTÉ One comedy-drama Women on the Verge.

In 2020, Mullen made her London stage debut in Meat at Theatre503 and played Peggy, Marianne's (Daisy Edgar-Jones) friend from Trinity College Dublin, in the BBC Three and Hulu miniseries adaptation of Sally Rooney's Normal People. It was around this time that Mullen got into photography. She then joined the main cast of the Sky Max comedy-drama Brassic for its third series as Samantha. She had a recurring role as Mary Pickett in the 2022 Amazon Prime science fiction series The Peripheral.

Mullen starred opposite Allen Leech in the 2023 true crime drama The Vanishing Triangle on Virgin Media Dance. She has an upcoming role in the RTÉ series These Sacred Vows.

=== Other ventures ===
In addition, Mullen is a visual artist and photographer. She exhibited at the Pioneri Gallery in Skopje, Macedonia.

== Personal life ==
Mullen is based in East London.

== Filmography ==
=== Film ===
Year	Title	Role	Notes
2016	Deirdre	Deirdre	Short film
2019	HALO	Katie	Short film
2023	The Christmas Break	Caroline	TV film
2025	Eureka	Sara	Short film
2026	Once Upon a Time in a Cinema	Lyla	

=== Television ===
Year	Title	Role	Notes
2014	Damo and Ivor	Rachel	Series 2; episode 2
2015–2017	Red Rock	Katie Kiely	Main role. Series 1–4; 83 episodes
2017	Vikings	Aethegyth	Series 5; episode 1: "The Departed: Part 1"
2017	Little Women	Belle Moffat	Miniseries; episode 2
2017–2019	Into the Badlands	Maryanne	Series 2; episode 7, and series 3; episodes 3 & 11
2018	Krypton	Sevi	Series 1; episodes 4 & 6–8
2018	Women on the Verge	Jen	Episodes 1, 5 & 6
2020	Normal People	Peggy	Miniseries; episodes 4–9
2021	Brassic	Samantha	Main role. Series 3; episodes 4–8
2022	The Peripheral	Mary Pickett	4 episodes
2023	The Vanishing Triangle	Lisa Wallace	AKA The Vanishings. Main role. Episodes 1–6
2024	Say Nothing	Lyra	Miniseries; episode 7: "Theater People"
2026	Under Salt Marsh	Lydia Taman	Series 1 episode 4
2026	These Sacred Vows	Ava	6 episodes
2026	It Gets Worse		

== Stage ==
Year	Title	Role	Notes
2016	The Wise Wound	Olivia	Smock Alley Theatre, Dublin
2017	The Eurydice Project	Eurydice	Project Arts Centre, Dublin
2019	Light a Penny Candle	Elizabeth White	Gaiety Theatre, Dublin
2020	Meat	Max	Theatre503, London

== Awards and nominations ==
Year	Award	Category	Work	Result	Ref.
2016	Richard Harris International Film Festival	Best Actor in a Female Role	Deirdre	Nominated	
