= Once Upon a Time in a Cinema =

2026 Irish film by David Gleeson

- Official poster
- Directed by: David Gleeson
- Screenplay by: David Gleeson
- Produced by: Nathalie Lichtenthaeler; Kirk D'Amico; Laurent Jacobs; Tara Doolan; Cloè Garbay; Bastien Sirodot; Judy Tossell; Trish Vasquez
- Starring: Colin Morgan; Calam Lynch; Niamh Cusack; Clara Crichton; Daniel Woodage; India Mullen; Tracey Collopy; Stanley Townsend; Elaine O’Dwyer; Andrew Bennett; Aidan Crowe; Dean Panter; Stuart Mackey; Samuel Duggan; Jonty Ross; Sean Shinners; Cos Egan; Ryan Bourke; Michael Casey; Ollie Ryan; Shane Davis; Ian Dillon
- Cinematography: Hyun De Grande
- Edited by: Bertrand Conard; John Murphy
- Music by: Perrine Virgile
- Production companies: Screen Ireland; Wide Eye Films; Egoli Tossell Pictures; UMedia Production Services
- Distributed by: A Contra Corriente
- Release dates: February 2026 (DIFF); 1 May 2026
- Running time: 92 minutes
- Country: Ireland
- Language: English

Once Upon a Time in a Cinema is a 2026 Irish comedy-drama film, written and directed by David Gleeson and starring Colin Morgan, Calam Lynch, Niamh Cusack, India Mullen, Stanley Townsend, and Liam O'Brien.

== Plot ==
In the 1980s, a movie theatre owner/manager (Colin Morgan) and his fellow employees are under siege from burst pipes, rodents, unruly customers, ageing equipment, inebriated projectionists, financial pressure and the unstoppable march of new technology in the form of the dreaded Video Home System (VHS) tape machine. Told in real time during a movie playing (Breathless, starring Richard Gere).

== Cast ==
- Colin Morgan as Earl Clancy
- Calam Lynch as Gerald Clancy
- Clara Crichton as Kate Clancy
- India Mullen as Lyla
- Niamh Cusack as Mrs. Healy
- Stanley Townsend as Harry Conway
- Elaine O’Dwyer as Alma
- Daniel Woodage as Vincent
- Liam O'Brien as Dickie Wall
- Ryan Bourke as Joe Gorman
- Cos Egan as Jack
- Andrew Bennett as Sgt Walsh
- Tracey Collopy as Tank
- Aidan Crowe as Gus
- Sean Shinners as Goose Guy
- Michael Casey as Cocky Stoner
- Stuart Mackey as Poster Thief
- Samuel Duggan as Fighting Teen 1
- Jonty Ross as Fighting Teen 2
- Ollie Ryan as Jelly Guy
- Shane Davis as Stoner
- Ian Dillon as Chip Van Owner
- Dean Panter as Dan Clancy

== Production ==
It was announced in 2024 that David Gleeson was returning to his native home in Limerick, Ireland, to begin shooting his feature film One Night Only, a collaboration between Ireland and Belgium. It was announced that Calam Lynch would star alongside his mother Niamh Cusack.

Filming took place in the old Royal Cinema in Limerick, which had been closed for almost three decades. The cinema was opened and re-constructed for the film. Gleeson set the film in a cinema as it reminded him of the cinema his family owned in his youth. Over 150 extras were brought on. Nathalie Lichtenthaeler and Judy Tossell of Wide Eye Films produced, with Primetime Emmy Award nominee Kirk D'Amico joining also. Shooting took place between 11 November and 6 December 2024. The film was co-financed by Screen Ireland.

== Release ==
U.S. distribution company Myriad Pictures sold the film to international distributors, including A Contracorriente Films (Spain), Cinemundo (Portugal), Break Out Pictures (Ireland), Rialto Distribution (Australia), and Tanweer Productions (Greece).

The Dublin International Film Festival selected Once Upon a Time in a Cinema to be the opening film at their 2026 event. In April 2026, the film was given its Limerick premiere in the Royal Theatre, the same theatre in which it was shot. Gleeson said he thought that they had "made history", being possibly the first movie to screen in the same building in which it was filmed. The film was released in cinemas on 1 May 2026.

== Critical reception ==
Reviews for the film were mostly positive, with many critics praising its witty humour and heartfelt story. Screen Daily called the film a "nostalgic 1980s drama". Film Ireland said that the feature was "an immersive trip back in time to the days when a weekly visit, preferably Friday night, to the local cinema was de rigueur", and that there was a "real sense of fun" watching it.
