= Allen Leech =

Irish actor

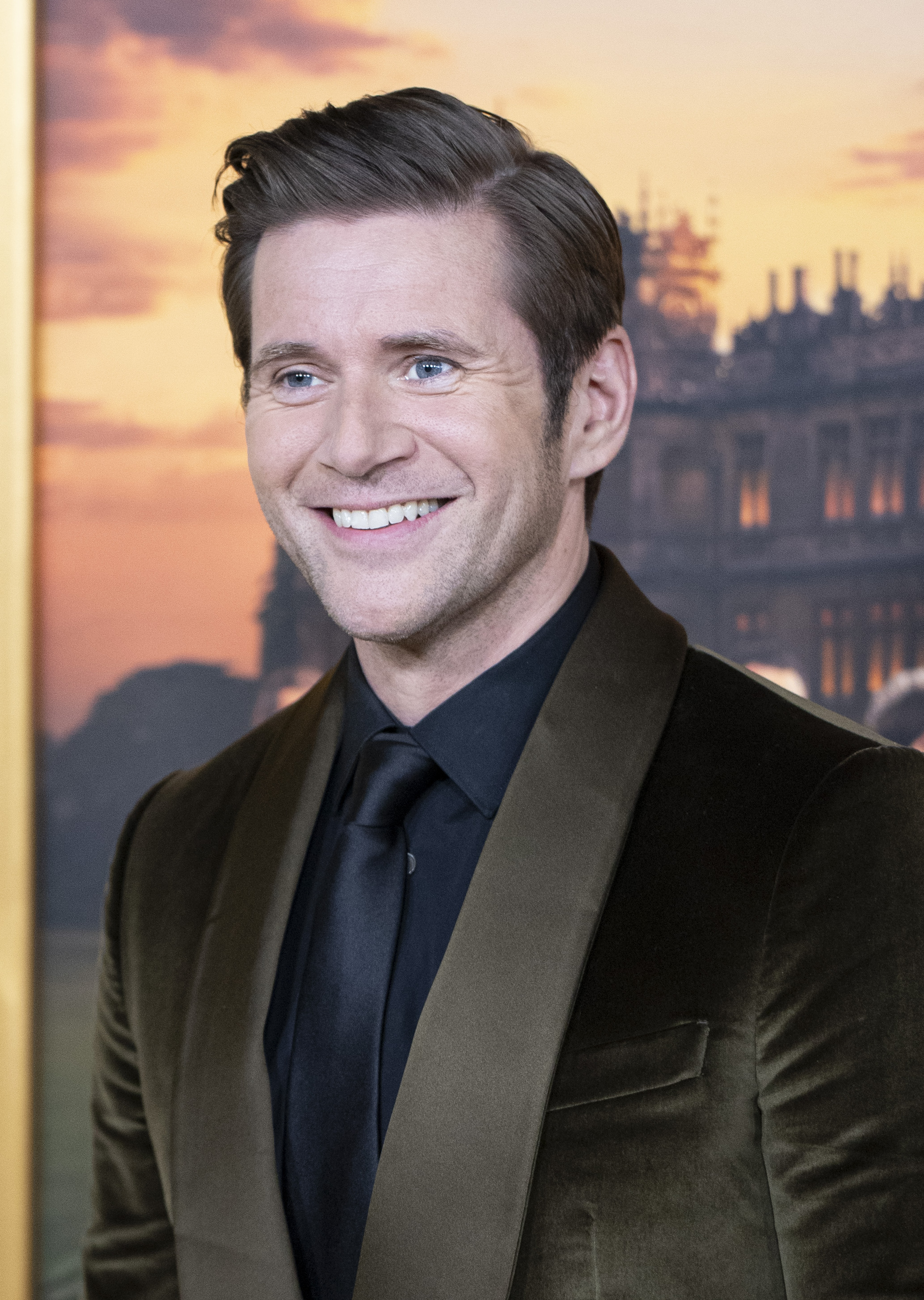
- Leech in 2025
- Born: Alan Leech; 18 May 1981 (age 45); Killiney, County Dublin, Ireland
- Education: Trinity College, Dublin
- Occupation: Actor
- Years active: 1998–present
- Spouse: Jessica Blair Herman (m. 2019)
- Children: 2

Allen Leech (born 18 May 1981) is an Irish actor. He is widely known for his roles as Tom Branson in the ITV period drama Downton Abbey (2010–2015) and Paul Prenter in the biopic Bohemian Rhapsody (2018).

Leech made his professional acting debut in the 1998 production of A Streetcar Named Desire, had his first major film role as Vincent Cusack in Cowboys & Angels (2003), and earned an Irish Film & Television Award nomination for his performance as Mo Chara in Man About Dog (2004). Leech also played Marcus Agrippa on the HBO historical drama series Rome (2007).

== Early life ==
Leech was born in Killiney, County Dublin, to David Leech, the CEO of a computer systems company, and Kay Leech. He is the third of four children: he has an older brother, Greg; an older sister, Alli; and a younger brother, Simon. He attended St Michael's College. Leech became interested in acting at 11 when he was given the part of the Cowardly Lion in a school production of The Wizard of Oz and found he loved being on stage. He recalled how he immediately decided to become an actor when Peter McDonald told him how acting is a profession on the last night of the production's run.

Afterwards, drama became the "focal point" of Leech's teenage years, apart from his family life, and drama and family support helped him through his school years. He became set on acting after winning a small role in a 1998 production of A Streetcar Named Desire at the Gate Theatre. He earned a Bachelor of Arts and a Master's Degree in Drama and Theatre Studies from Trinity College Dublin, later noting this was a "loophole" in his parents' stipulation that he earn a degree to fall back on if he failed to have success as an actor. He landed his first major roles in Cowboys & Angels and Man About Dog while at Trinity, and he has admitted that he did little schoolwork because he spent his time on auditions and acting.

== Career ==
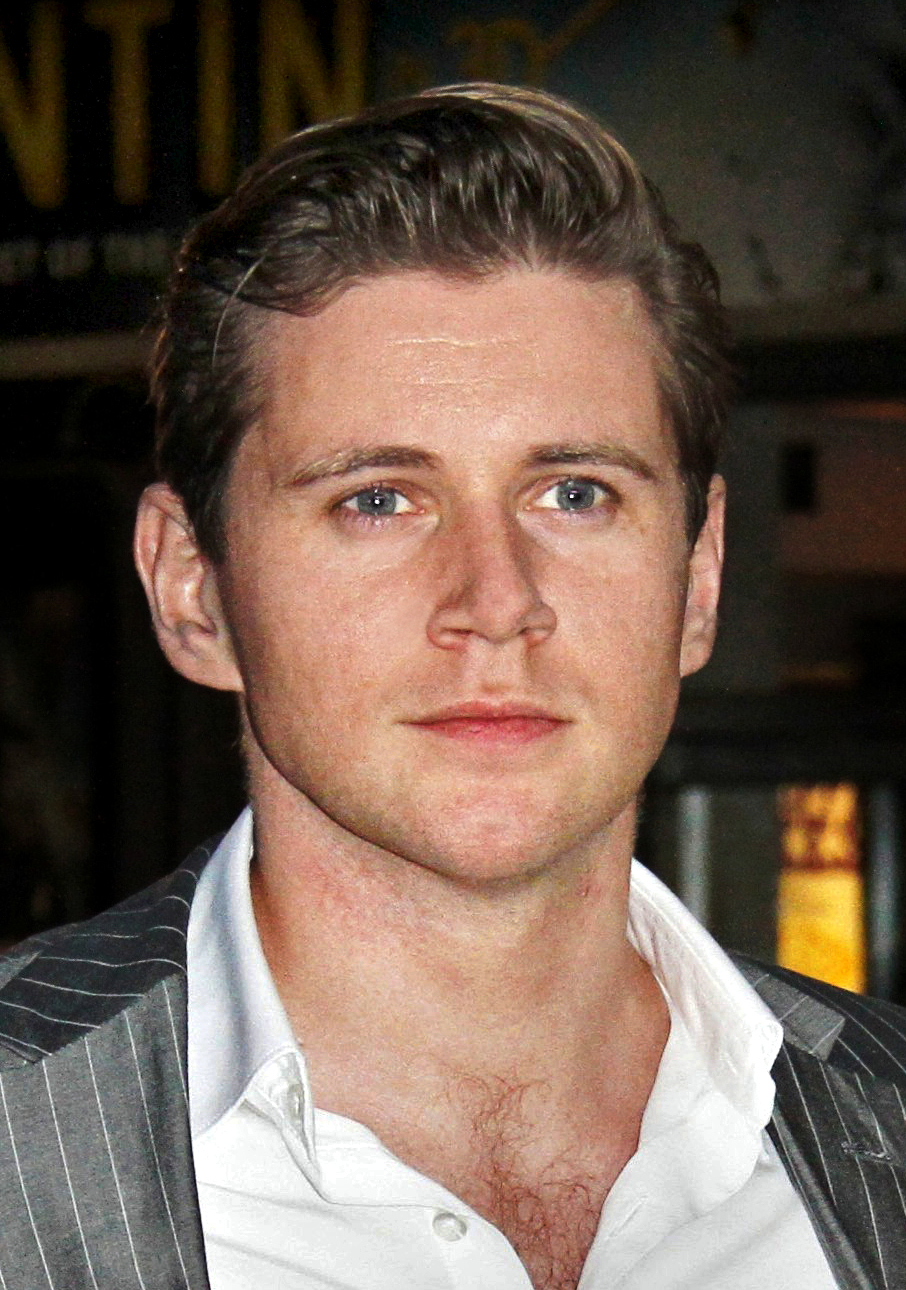
Leech at the London premiere of The Adventures of Tintin in 2011

Leech's first professional stage role was in 1998 at the Gate in their production of A Streetcar Named Desire. "I was the gentleman caller to Frances McDormand's Blanche Dubois. The Coen brothers were walking backstage, and me a naive 16-year-old."

He appeared as Willi in the Queen and Peacock, at the Garter Lane Arts Centre. The following years, Leech was in Tom Murphy's The Morning After Optimism and then Hugh Leonard's Da at the Abbey.

Leech's breakthrough film performance was in Cowboys and Angels, in which he played Vincent, a gay fashion student, followed by a role in the 2004 cross-country caper film Man About Dog.

Leech played the role of Shane Kirwan in the Ireland's RTÉ series Love Is the Drug, in which he received a Best Actor nomination from the Irish Film and Television Awards. He followed that up with the role of Willy in the television series Legend, which is the story of three different Irish families. He received a Best Supporting Actor nomination from Irish Film and Television Awards for his performance.

In 2007, Leech appeared in the HBO drama series Rome as Marcus Agrippa, Octavian's top soldier and friend. The film, Rewind, opened in Ireland on 25 March 2011.

In 2010, he appeared on the small screen in The Tudors as the doomed Francis Dereham, former lover of Catherine Howard. Leech also appeared in ITV 2010s television series Downton Abbey as chauffeur Tom Branson, whose twin beliefs in socialism and Irish Republicanism clash with those of the British upper class. He played the role of officer Sam Leonard in television series Primeval in 2011 in series five. Leech also starred in the 2012 film adaptation The Sweeney. In 2014 he starred alongside Benedict Cumberbatch, as the spy John Cairncross, in The Imitation Game.

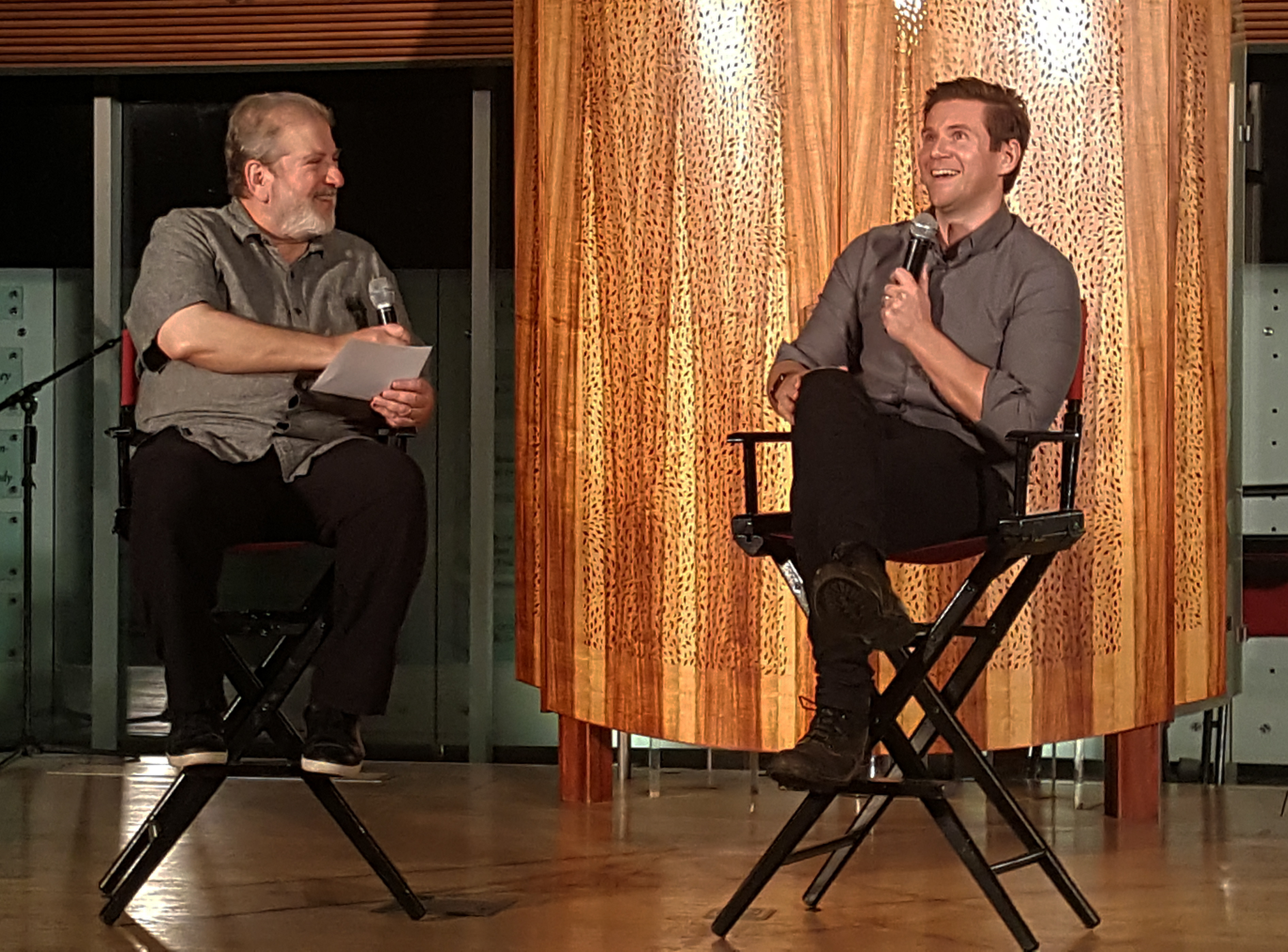
Leech at the Malibu Film Society in 2019

Leech was voted sexiest Irish male in 2005 in U Magazine. He was named one of GQ's 50 best dressed men in Britain in 2015.

In 2017, Leech appeared alongside Ginnifer Goodwin in the Los Angeles stage production of Constellations. The play ran from June 14 to July 23, 2017, at the Geffen Playhouse.

Leech played Paul Prenter, who was briefly Freddie Mercury's manager and lover, in the biopic Bohemian Rhapsody (2018), which earned him a nomination for Outstanding Performance by a Cast in a Motion Picture at the 25th Screen Actors Guild Awards.

In 2023 he starred alongside India Mullen in the crime drama The Vanishing Triangle.

Leech reprised his role as Tom Branson in the feature films Downton Abbey (2019) and Downton Abbey: A New Era (2022), and in the third and final film in the franchise, Downton Abbey: The Grand Finale (2025).

== Personal life ==
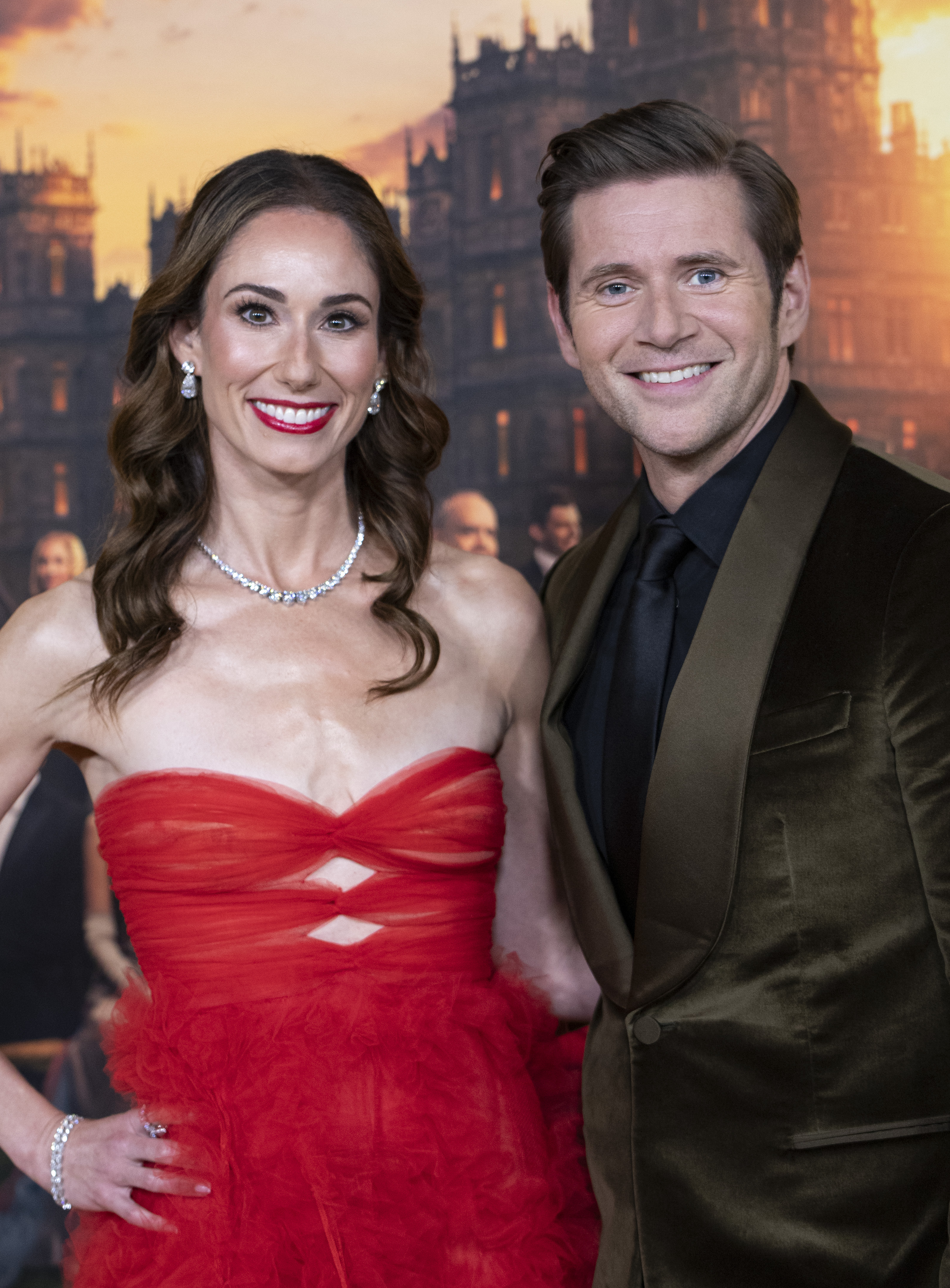
Leech with his wife, Jessica Blair Herman, in 2025

In February 2018, Leech announced his engagement to actress Jessica Blair Herman. They were married in an outdoor ceremony on 5 January 2019 at the Alisal Ranch and Resort in Solvang, California. Guests at the ceremony included Leech's Downton Abbey co-stars Michelle Dockery and Dan Stevens, as well as his Bohemian Rhapsody co-stars Rami Malek, Gwilym Lee, and Lucy Boynton. In September 2019, the couple announced they were expecting their first daughter. In May 2022, they announced that they were expecting their second daughter, due later that year.

== Filmography ==
=== Film ===
Year	Title	Role	Notes
2000	Iníon an Fhiaclóra (The Dentist's Daughter)	Rory	Short film
2002	The Escapist	Policeman 1 (Smashed Car)	
2003	Cowboys & Angels	Vincent Cusack	
2004	Man About Dog	Mo Chara	
2007	Deep Breaths	Danny	Short films
2008	Factory Farmed		Short films
2009	From Time to Time	Fred Boggis	
2010	Rewind	Karl	
2012	The Sweeney	DC Simon Ellis	
2013	Grand Piano	Wayne	
2013	In Fear	Max	
2013	Hello Darkness	Mark Cooper	
2014	The Imitation Game	John Cairncross	
2017	The Hunter's Prayer	Richard Addison	
2018	Bohemian Rhapsody	Paul Prenter	
2019	Tired		Short film
2019	Downton Abbey	Tom Branson	
2022	Downton Abbey: A New Era	Tom Branson	
2024	You Can't Run Forever	Eddie	
2024	Cold Meat	David Petersen	
2025	Downton Abbey: The Grand Finale	Tom Branson	

=== Television ===
Year	Title	Role	Notes
2000	Yesterday's Children	Brian	Television films
2003	Benedict Arnold: A Question of Honor	British Officer	Television films
2004	Battlefield Britain	Jacobite	Mini-series; episode 7: "Culloden: The Jacobites' Last Stand"
2004	Love Is the Drug	Shane Kirwan	Episodes 1–4
2006	Legend	Willy	Episodes 1–6
2007	Rome	Marcus Agrippa	Series 2; episodes 3–10
2008	Heroes and Villains	Edeco	Episode 2: "Attila the Hun"
2010	The Tudors	Francis Dereham	Series 4; episodes 4, 5 & 9
2010–2015	Downton Abbey	Tom Branson	Series 1–6; 45 episodes
2011	Primeval	Officer Sam Leonard	Series 5; episode 2: "The Submarine"
2011	Black Mirror	Pike	Series 1; Episode 1: "The National Anthem"
2017	Bellevue	Eddie Rowe	Episodes 1–8
2018	Doing Money	DI Dougie Grant	Television films
2019	Surveillance	Scott Yardley	Television films
2020	The Good Doctor	Ariel Reznik	Series 3; episode 13: "Sex and Death"
2021	As Luck Would Have It	Brennan O'Brien	Television film
2023	The Vanishing Triangle	David Burkely	AKA The Vanishings. Episodes 1–6. Also executive producer
2024	Too Good To Be True	Elliott Fielding	Episodes 1–4. Also executive producer
2025	Bulldozer	Greg Roddy	Television film
2026	The Westies	Brendan Cahill	

=== Video games ===
Year	Title	Role	Notes
2012	Assassin's Creed III	Thomas Hickey (voice)	
2015	The Witcher 3: Wild Hunt	Hjalmar an Craite (voice)	English version

=== Stage ===
Year	Title	Role	Theatre	Notes
1998	A Streetcar Named Desire	Gentleman Caller	Gate Theatre	Performed as Alan Leech
1999	This Lime Tree Bower	Joe	New Theatre	Performed as Alan Leech
2000	The Queen and Peacock	Willie	Garter Lane Arts Centre	Performed as Alan Leech
2001	The Morning After Optimism	Edmund	Abbey Theatre	Performed as Alan Leech
2002	Da	Young Charlie	Abbey Theatre	Performed as Alan Leech
2008	Everybody Loves Sylvia	Harlequin	Project Arts Centre	
2008	Zero Hour	Benny, Ensemble	Abbey Theatre	
2010	Phaedra	Hippolytus	Project Arts Centre	
2010	On Baile's Strand	Young Man	Abbey Theatre	
2011	Ecstasy	Mick	Hampstead Theatre, Duchess Theatre	
2017	Constellations	Roland	Geffen Playhouse	

== Appearances ==
Year	Appearance	Notes
2004	The Panel	TV series (1 episode: "Episode #2.5")
2005	3rd Irish Film and Television Awards	TV documentary
2007	4th Irish Film and Television Awards	Presenter

== Awards and nominations ==
Year	Award	Category	Work	Result
2004	Irish Film & Television Awards	Best New Talent	Cowboys & Angels	Nominated
2005	Irish Film & Television Awards	Best Actor in Television	Love Is the Drug	Nominated
2007	Irish Film & Television Awards	Best Actor in a Supporting Role in Television	Legend	Nominated
2013	Irish Film & Television Awards	Best Actor in a Supporting Role in Television	Downton Abbey	Nominated
2013	Screen Actors Guild Award	Outstanding Performance by an Ensemble in a Drama Series	Downton Abbey	Won
2014	Screen Actors Guild Award	Outstanding Performance by an Ensemble in a Drama Series	Downton Abbey	Nominated
2015	Screen Actors Guild Award	Outstanding Performance by an Ensemble in a Drama Series	Downton Abbey	Won
2015	Screen Actors Guild Award	Outstanding Performance by a Cast in a Motion Picture	The Imitation Game	Nominated
2015	Irish Film & Television Awards	Best Actor in a Supporting Role – Film	The Imitation Game	Nominated
2015	20th Critics' Choice Awards	Best Acting Ensemble	The Imitation Game	Nominated
2016	Screen Actors Guild Award	Outstanding Performance by an Ensemble in a Drama Series	Downton Abbey	Won
2019	Screen Actors Guild Award	Outstanding Performance by a Cast in a Motion Picture	Bohemian Rhapsody	Nominated
