= Rebecca Daly =

Irish film director and screenwriter

Rebecca Daly MA
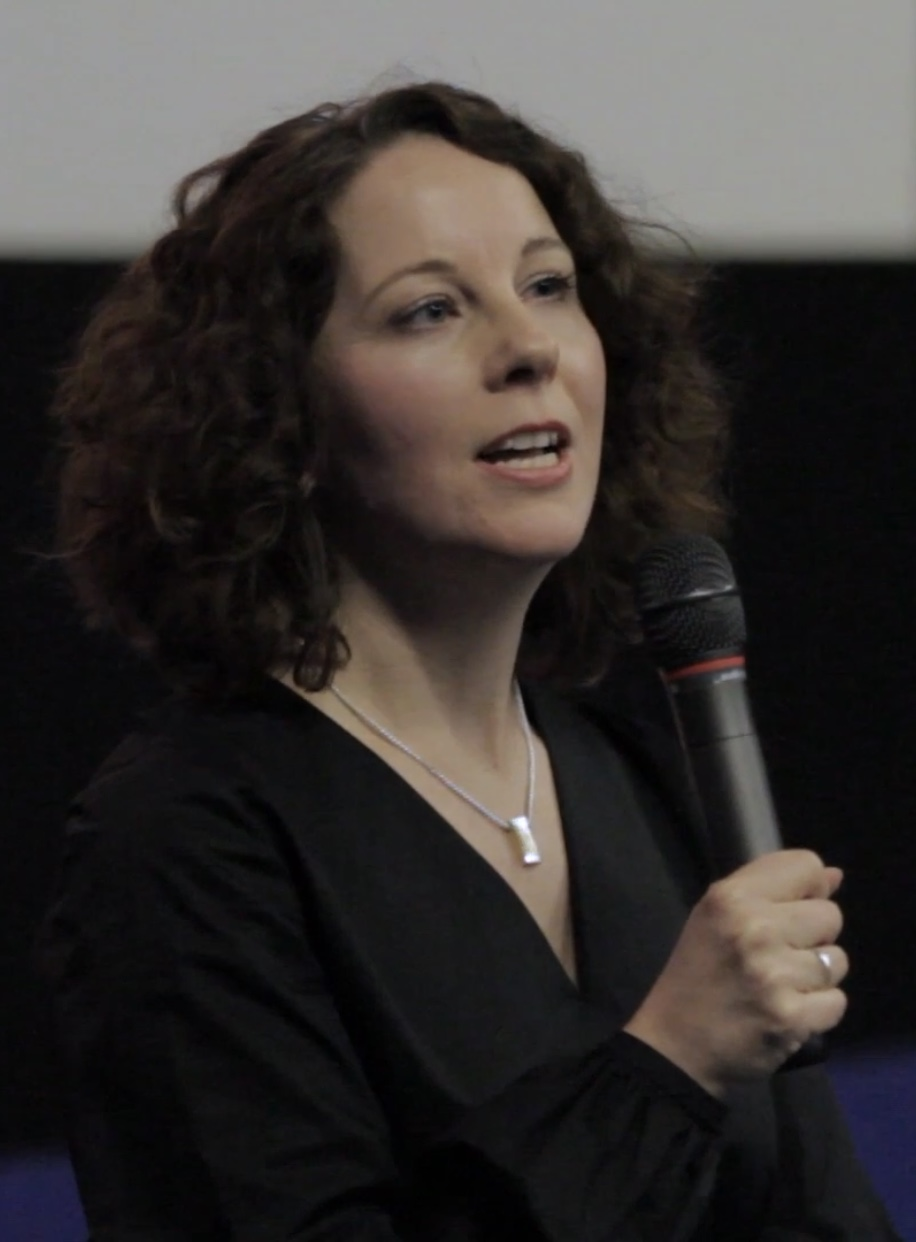
- Daly at the 2016 Dublin International Film Festival
- Born: 1980 (age 45–46); West Sussex, England, United Kingdom
- Education: Trinity College, Dublin; Dublin Institute of Technology
- Occupations: film director, screenwriter, props buyer
- Years active: 2005–present
- Notable work: Mammal

Rebecca Daly (born 1980) is an Irish film director, screenwriter, and actress.

== Early life ==
Daly was born in West Sussex and grew up in an Irish family in Haywards Heath. They later moved to Naas, Ireland. She studied theatre studies and English literature at Trinity College Dublin and completed an MA in film at Dublin Institute of Technology.

== Career ==
Daly has written and directed three features and two shorts:

- Joyriders (2006, short)
- Hum (2010, short)
- The Other Side of Sleep (2011)
- Mammal (2016)
- Good Favour (2017)

She won a Dublin Film Critics' Circle award for Best Irish Director for Good Favour.

== Personal life ==
Daly lives in Cork, Ireland. Her favourite films are Lost in Translation (2003), Uncle Boonmee Who Can Recall His Past Lives (2010) and Under the Skin (2013).
