= Paul Prenter =

English music manager (1946–1991)

- Born: 1946; London, England
- Died: August 1991 (aged 44–45) Belfast, Northern Ireland
- Occupations: Music manager, personal assistant
- Years active: 1977–1986

Paul Prenter (19 March 1946 – 22 August 1991) was a Northern Irish music manager, known for being Freddie Mercury's manager from 1977 to 1986. He attracted criticism for the influence he had over the star.

== Life ==
Prenter was born in London, in 1946, and later raised in Belfast, Northern Ireland. He had three brothers; Stephen, Gerard, and Ray. He was openly gay from the age of 16, and his parents were accepting of his sexuality.

He worked as a disc jockey in Belfast, Northern Ireland. It is widely believed that he met Freddie Mercury at a bar in 1975, and became his manager two years later. It has been suggested that he and Mercury had a sexual relationship during this time, although Prenter's brothers strongly dispute this.

The first five years of his work with Mercury are thought to have been fairly positive. However, the relationship became more strained from 1982, with the release of the album Hot Space. Prenter did not have a good relationship with any of the other members of Queen, and the album was not as successful as had been hoped. Brian May and Roger Taylor blamed Prenter's influence for the album's sound which they disliked. Nevertheless, he remained in Mercury's employment for several more years.

After his employment with Mercury came to an end, Prenter caused controversy in 1987, when he sold a story to The Sun newspaper, in which he revealed Mercury's sexuality and exposed his relationship with Jim Hutton. Prenter's brothers have explained this by stating that he was upset about being fired by Mercury, leaving him unable to pay for his treatment for HIV/AIDS, which he was suffering from by this time. His brother Ray stated, "Paul was very bitter. He felt they let him down, and he was hurt. He worked for them for years, and he got very little from them. That was when he decided he had to get a few bob for his own treatment, so that is why he went with the papers."

== Death ==
Prenter died of HIV/AIDS, in August 1991, just a few months before Mercury died of the same illness on 24 November 1991.

== In fiction ==
Prenter was played by Allen Leech in the 2018 biopic Bohemian Rhapsody.
