= Freelance (2023 film) =

American film by Pierre Morel

- Theatrical release poster
- Directed by: Pierre Morel
- Written by: Jacob Lentz
- Produced by: Jacob Lentz; Chris Milburn; Renee Tab; Christopher Tuffin; Steve Richards
- Starring: John Cena; Alison Brie; Juan Pablo Raba; Christian Slater
- Cinematography: Thierry Arbogast
- Edited by: Chris Tonick
- Music by: Elliot Leung; Geoff Zanelli (themes)
- Production companies: AGC Studios; Endurance Media
- Distributed by: Relativity Media
- Release date: October 27, 2023
- Running time: 109 minutes
- Country: United States
- Language: English
- Budget: $40 million
- Box office: $10.2 million

Freelance is a 2023 American action comedy film directed by Pierre Morel and written by Jacob Lentz in his feature writing debut. It stars John Cena, Alison Brie, Juan Pablo Raba, and Christian Slater. The film was released by Relativity Media on October 27, 2023, grossing $10.2 million.

== Plot ==
Mason Pettits, a U.S. Army Special Forces operator, is injured and medically discharged after his helicopter is shot down during a failed mission to assassinate Juan Venegas, the dictator of the fictional South American nation of Paldonia. Years later, Mason, stuck in a dead-end job at a law firm, is approached by an old teammate, Sebastian Earle. Sebastian offers Mason a lucrative private security job protecting disgraced journalist Claire Wellington, who has been invited to Paldonia by Venegas to interview him in the midst of an uprising against his regime. Mason reluctantly accepts the job, upsetting his wife Jenny, who wishes him to remain in the life of his daughter Casey.

Mason and Claire travel to Paldonia, with Venegas personally escorting them from the airport. However, while they are on their way to Venegas' estate, the convoy is ambushed by a militant group, which destroys their vehicles and kills Venegas' bodyguards. Mason fights off the assailants and escapes into the jungle with Claire and Venegas.

Venegas deduces that their attackers were his own soldiers in disguise, and that the assassination attempt is a coup orchestrated by his nephew Jorge, with the backing of a South African military group led by Colonel Jan Koehorst. Mason calls for an evacuation helicopter for himself and Claire, hoping to abandon Venegas in the jungle. However, the arriving helicopter is crewed by mercenaries who attempt to kill Mason and Claire. Mason, with a little help from Venegas, fights them off, and the group arrives at a village where Venegas is highly respected.

Claire successfully films her interview with Venegas, in which he asserts sovereignty over Paldonia's valuable mineral resources. While Mason bonds further with Claire, he resists her romantic advances, remembering his family back home. The next day, Venegas hints at a true purpose for Mason's job. Mason calls Sebastian, who informs him that he was actually hired by the South Africans to have Mason assassinate Venegas, as a reprisal for the dictator's refusal to sign over the rights to Paldonia's oil. Jan and his men subsequently arrive at the village and chase the group; Mason and Venegas escape on horseback, but Claire is captured.

While on the way to Paldonia's capital, Venegas claims that the helicopter crash that took Mason out of action was a friendly fire incident. Later, the two stage a trade for Claire, while Venegas reveals that the "uprising" against his regime was staged and that he is in fact much loved by his people. The next day, during the trade, Venegas brings in fake protestors to distract Jan as he, Mason, and Claire flee to the safety of the presidential palace. There, Venegas convinces Jorge to help him lead the country better, but General Martínez, Venegas's trusted lieutenant, reveals himself as another conspirator; Jorge is killed shielding his uncle.

Jan and his men arrive at the palace, and a shootout ensues between them and Venegas' palace guards, during which Mason fights Jan alone. Jan reveals that he was responsible for killing Mason's crew. Claire, who films the battle, helps Mason defeat Jan. Afterwards, Sebastian and his team arrive and deal with the rest of Jan's militants.

Sometime later, Claire has managed to restore her career with the footage from Paldonia, Venegas steps down from power in favor of democratic elections, and Mason reunites with his family before being gifted $5 million by Venegas, allowing him to leave his hated job.

== Cast ==
- John Cena as Mason Pettits, a medically retired former U.S. Army Special Forces soldier and now a lawyer
- Alison Brie as Claire Wellington, a journalist
- Juan Pablo Raba as President Juan Venegas
- Christian Slater as Sebastian Earle, Mason's boss and also a former U.S. Army Special Forces soldier
- Alice Eve as Jenny Pettits, Mason's wife
- Marton Csokas as Colonel Jan Koehorst, a South African mercenary working against Venegas
- Sebastián Eslava as Jorge Vásquez, Venegas' nephew

Mason's and Jenny's daughter is portrayed by child actress Molly McCann.

== Production ==
Freelance is the feature writing debut of television screenwriter Jacob Lentz. The film was announced on October 6, 2021, with Pierre Morel directing and John Cena attached to star. The film was reported to have a budget of at least $40 million. In January 2022, Alison Brie, Juan Pablo Raba, Alice Eve, Marton Csokas, and Christian Slater joined the cast. Filming began in Colombia on January 17, 2022, with cinematographer Thierry Arbogast, and wrapped in April 2022.

== Release ==
Freelance was released in theaters by Relativity Media on October 27, 2023. It was released on premium video on demand on November 28, 2023, with a DVD and Blu-ray release date of March 12, 2024.

== Reception ==
=== Box office ===
The film made $880,000 from 2,057 theaters in its first day, and went on to debut to $2.1 million, finishing in seventh.

=== Critical response ===
On the review aggregator website Rotten Tomatoes, 10% of 39 critics' reviews are positive, with an average rating of 3.2/10. The website's consensus reads: "Much like a real-life Freelance gig, this sodden action comedy offers no benefits." Metacritic, which uses a weighted average, assigned the film a score of 26 out of 100, based on 13 critics, indicating "generally unfavorable" reviews. Audiences polled by CinemaScore gave the film an average grade of "B−" on an A+ to F scale, while those polled by PostTrak gave it a 58% overall positive score, with 27% saying they would definitely recommend the film.
