= Eileen O'Higgins =

Irish actress

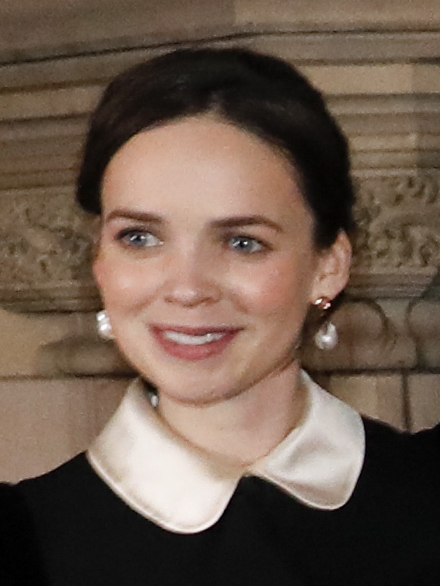
- O'Higgins at the Mary Queen of Scots premiere in 2019
- Education: Royal Welsh College of Music & Drama
- Occupation: Actress

Eileen O'Higgins is an Irish actress. Her breakthrough role was in the play Hold Your Tongue, Hold Your Dead which led to a supporting role in the film Brooklyn (2015) and Mary Queen of Scots (2018).

== Early life ==
Born Eileen O'Higgins on 22 January 1987 in Castlewellan, County Down, Northern Ireland, where she grew up. She attended St. Malachy's Primary School and Assumption Grammar School in Ballynahinch, County Down. O'Higgins later studied at the Royal Welsh College of Music & Drama in Cardiff.

== Career ==
After graduating, O'Higgins starred in the BBC television miniseries adaptation Emma, and the television film Enid based on the life of Enid Blyton with Helena Bonham Carter (both in 2009). She then appeared in theatre productions including Alice Birch's And Then There Were Four Little Beats of Four Little Hearts on the Edge of the World at The Old Vic.

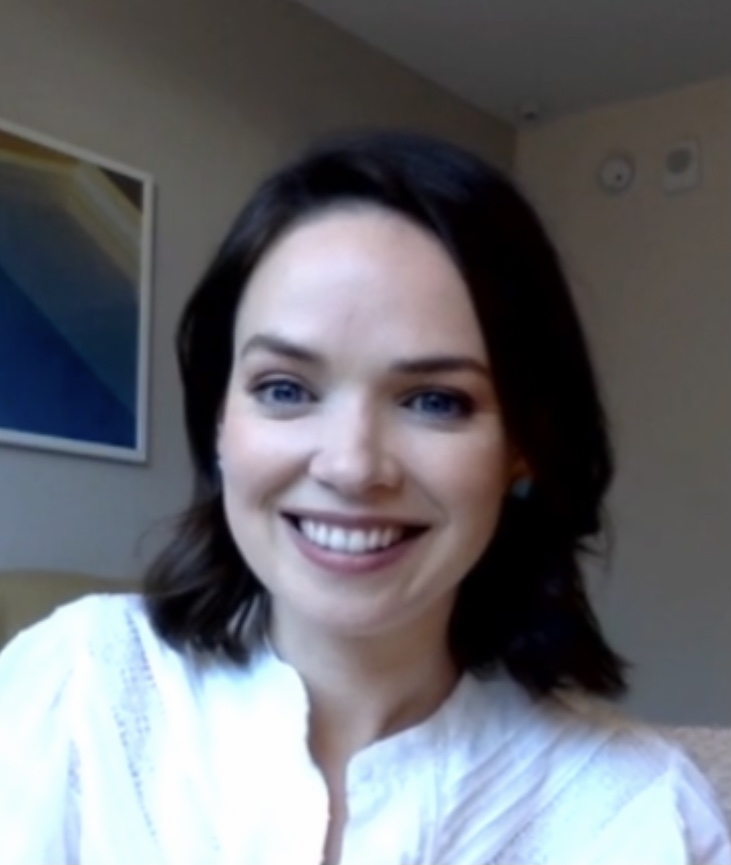
O'Higgins being interviewed in May 2022

Her breakthrough role was a supporting role as a young pregnant woman in the play Hold Your Tongue, Hold Your Dead. A reviewer for The Harvard Crimson commented that her performance "conveyed an urgency... that was immediate and relatable". Her appearance helped her to be cast in a supporting role in her first film Brooklyn (2015) which also starred Saoirse Ronan. O'Higgins then appeared in the BBC television series My Mother and Other Strangers (2016). O’Higgins reteamed with Ronan in the film Mary Queen of Scots playing Scottish noblewoman Mary Beaton.

In the early 2020s, she appeared in the crime drama series Dead Still (2020) and the film Misbehaviour (2020), starring Keira Knightley, followed by roles in the Netflix series The Irregulars (2021) and the Epix series Billy the Kid.

== Filmography ==
Key
†	Denotes films that have not yet been released

=== Film ===
Year	Title	Role	Notes
2015	Brooklyn	Nancy	
2016	The Party	Allison	
2018	Grace and Goliath	Lucy	
2018	Mary Queen of Scots	Mary Beaton	
2020	Misbehaviour	Joan Billings	
2020	Nowhere Special	Shona	
2022	Here Before	Marie	
2022	The Queue	Amy	
TBA	James and Lucia †	Lucia Joyce	Pre-production

=== Television ===
Year	Title	Role	Notes
2009	Enid	Maid Maggie	
2009	Emma	Miss Martin 1	2 episodes
2016	My Mother and Other Strangers	Emma Coyne	5 episodes
2018	Genius	Eva Gouel	
2020	Dead Still	Nancy Vickers	6 episodes
2021	The Irregulars	Alice	3 episodes
2022	Billy the Kid	Kathleen McCarty	3 episodes
