= Mammal (film) =

2016 film

- Film poster
- Directed by: Rebecca Daly
- Written by: Rebecca Daly; Glenn Montgomery
- Produced by: Conor Barry; Macdara Kelleher
- Starring: Rachel Griffiths; Barry Keoghan; Michael McElhatton; Nika McGuigan; Johnny Ward
- Cinematography: Lennart Verstegen
- Edited by: Halina Daugird
- Music by: Rutger Reinders
- Production companies: Fastnet Films; Calach Films; Les Films Fauves; Rinkel Film
- Distributed by: Wildcard Distribution (Ireland); Cinéart (Benelux)
- Release date: 24 January 2016 (Sundance)
- Running time: 100 minutes
- Countries: Ireland; Luxembourg; Netherlands
- Language: English

Mammal is a 2016 Irish-Luxembourgish-Dutch drama film directed by Rebecca Daly, who co-wrote the screenplay with Glenn Montgomery. Starring Rachel Griffiths and Barry Keoghan, the cast also includes Michael McElhatton, Nika McGuigan, and Johnny Ward in supporting roles. It was shown in the World Cinema Dramatic Competition section at the 2016 Sundance Film Festival.

== Cast ==
- Rachel Griffiths as Margaret
- Barry Keoghan as Joe
- Michael McElhatton as Matt
- Nika McGuigan as Ann Marie
- Johnny Ward as Sully
- Joanne Crawford as Jean Cunningham
- Aoife King as Claire
- Rachel O'Byrne as Lucinda

== Reception ==
On review aggregator website Rotten Tomatoes, the film holds an approval rating of 75% based on 8 reviews, with an average rating of 6.6/10.
