= Imogen Murphy =

Irish film and television director

- Education: Dún Laoghaire Institute of Art, Design and Technology
- Occupation: Film director

Imogen Murphy is an Irish film and television director. She has directed a number of successful Irish and British TV shows such as Grace and Dead Still, as well as several award-winning short films. In 2021 she was nominated for an Irish Film & Television Academy award for her work on Dead Still. She is a graduate of the National Film School of Ireland and Trinity College, Dublin.

== Career ==
In 2025 Imogen Murphy directed the Series 5 finale of ITV Studios crime drama Grace. In 2023 she directed and executive produced thriller series The Vanishing Triangle for Sundance Now.

In 2020 she was lead director and co-story writer on Irish murder mystery series Dead Still, which was nominated for the Royal Television Society Ireland Drama Award 2021, and for seven awards at the 17th Irish Film & Television Awards, including Best Drama, Best Script and Best Director.

Imogen Murphy's short film, Seanie & Flo, won the 2020 audience award at the Chicago Irish Film Festival. In 2018 she directed the second series of Irish comedy drama Can't Cope, Won't Cope, which was nominated for Best Drama Series at the 2019 Celtic Media Festival.

In 2017, she directed the film Cry Rosa which won the Kurzfilm Hamburg International Film Festival Mo Award, and was nominated for a Royal Television Society award as well as the award for best short drama at the 15th Irish Film & Television Awards. Previously Murphy directed blocks of drama series Red Rock and Hollyoaks.
