= Can't Cope, Won't Cope =

- Genre: Comedy drama
- Created by: Stefanie Preissner
- Directed by: Cathy Brady; Imogen Murphy
- Starring: Seána Kerslake; Nika McGuigan; Muiris Crowley; Amy Huberman
- Country of origin: Ireland
- Original language: English
- No. of series: 2
- No. of episodes: 12

Production
- Executive producers: Ailish McElmeel; Paul Donovan; Eddie Doyle & Justin Healy; Greg Phillips & Vicky Ryan
- Production location: Dublin
- Running time: 30 minutes
- Production company: Deadpan pictures

Original release
- Network: RTÉ2
- Release: 19 September 2016 – 28 May 2018

Can't Cope, Won't Cope is an Irish comedy-drama television series. It was created by Stefanie Preissner and produced by Deadpan Pictures for RTÉ2 in 2016. Seána Kerslake played fund manager Aisling and Nika McGuigan played art student Danielle. They are twenty-something friends from Mallow, County Cork, who share a house in Dublin. The first season was picked up by BBC 3 in 2017 and Netflix in the US, UK and Republic of Ireland in 2018. A second series was commissioned in 2017 and broadcast in 2018. The series also featured Amy Huberman. In August 2018, writer Stefanie Preissner confirmed that a third series would not be made, thus ending the series.

== Cast ==
- Seána Kerslake as Aisling O'Dowd
- Nika McGuigan as Danielle Mullane
- Amy Huberman as Kate
- Sheila Moylette as Lorraine
- Muiris Crowley as Ferg
- Hannah Sheehan as Rachel
- Steve Blount as Taxi Good
- Laurence O'Fuarain as Lorcan (series 1)
- Lesa Thurman as Jennifer (series 1)
- Seán Óg Cairns as Austin (series 2)
- Peter Campion as Joe (series 2)

== Episodes ==
Series	Episodes	Originally released	
Series	Episodes	First released	Last released
1	6	13 September 2016	17 October 2016
2	6	23 April 2018	28 May 2018

=== Series 1 (2016) ===
No. overall	No. in series	Title	Directed by	Written by	Original release date
1	1	"I Wanna Be Like You"	Cathy Brady	Stefanie Preissner	19 September 2016
2	2	"Drive On, Drive On, Drive On, Drive On"	Cathy Brady	Stefanie Preissner	19 September 2016
3	3	"Welcome to Ireland"	Cathy Brady	Stefanie Preissner	26 September 2016
4	4	"Mallowfornia"	Cathy Brady	Stefanie Preissner	3 October 2016
5	5	"Release Me"	Cathy Brady	Stefanie Preissner	10 October 2016
6	6	"End, Like!"	Cathy Brady	Stefanie Preissner	17 October 2016

=== Series 2 (2018) ===
No. overall	No. in series	Title	Directed by	Written by	Original release date
7	1	"Worlds Apart"	Imogen Murphy	Stefanie Preissner	23 April 2018
8	2	"New Beginnings"	Imogen Murphy	Stefanie Preissner	30 April 2018
9	3	"WhatsAppening"	Imogen Murphy	Stefanie Preissner	7 May 2018
10	4	"Situationship"	Imogen Murphy	Stefanie Preissner	14 May 2018
11	5	"Back to Backwards"	Imogen Murphy	Stefanie Preissner	21 May 2018
12	6	"This Is the End"	Imogen Murphy	Stefanie Preissner	28 May 2018
