= Nika McGuigan =

British actress (1986–2019)

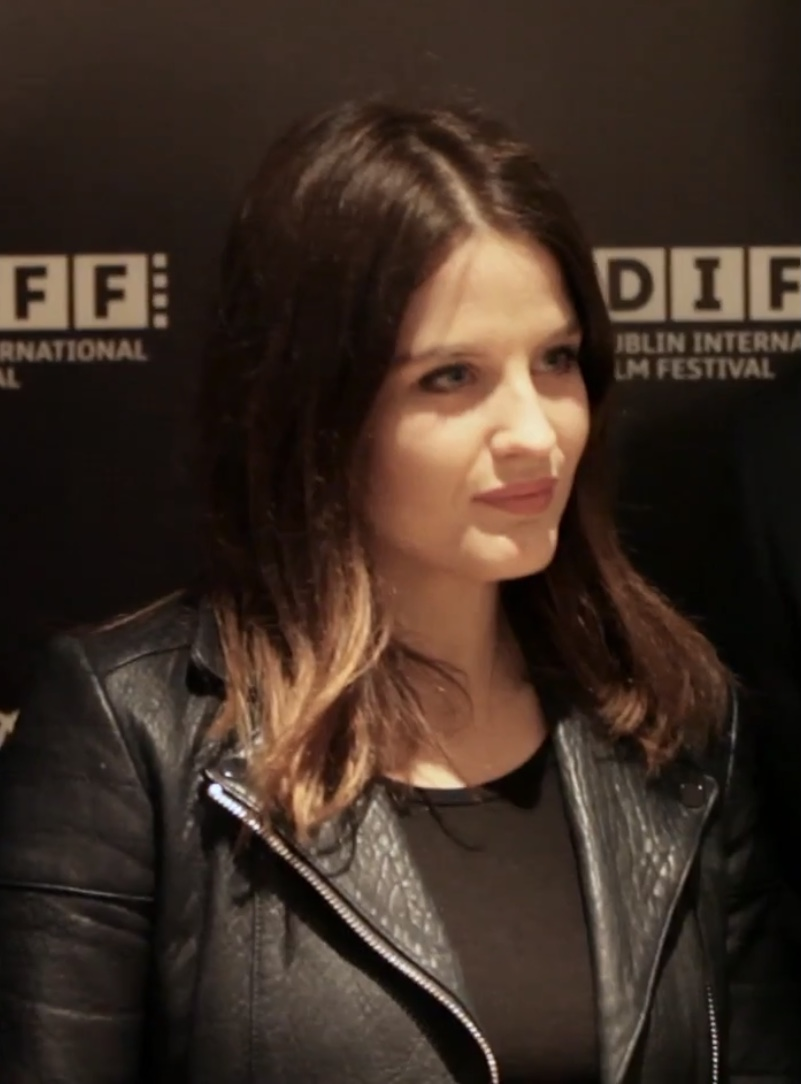
- Nika McGuigan at the 2016 Dublin International Film Festival
- Born: 4 January 1986; Newry, Northern Ireland
- Died: 23 July 2019 (aged 33); Dublin, Ireland
- Other names: Danika McGuigan
- Occupation: Actress
- Years active: 2000–2019
- Father: Barry McGuigan
- Family: Pat McGuigan (grandfather); Shane McGuigan (brother)

Danika McGuigan (4 January 1986 – 23 July 2019) was a Northern Irish actress, born in Northern Ireland and raised in England. She was known for her role as Danielle Mullane in Can't Cope, Won't Cope (2016–2018). She was posthumously awarded Best Actress at the 2021 IFTA Awards for her final role in Wildfire (2020). Her previous films included Philomena (2013), Mammal (2016), and The Secret Scripture (2016).

== Early life and education ==
McGuigan was born in Newry, Northern Ireland on 4 January 1986, the second of four children and only daughter of Barry McGuigan, a former world champion boxer, and his wife Sandra. She had three brothers, including Shane.

McGuigan spent her early childhood in Clones, County Monaghan before the family settled in rural Kent, England near Whitstable. She attended St Edmund's School Canterbury and then boarded at Benenden School. She trained in Dublin, graduating from the Gaiety School of Acting in 2006, and The Factory (now Bow Street) in 2013 before moving to London.

== Death ==
McGuigan was first diagnosed with acute lymphoblastic leukaemia at age 11 in 1997, but recovered from the illness after two years. She was pulled out of school at the time for her treatment at St Bartholomew's Hospital, London. She died from bowel cancer on 23 July 2019, aged 33.

== Filmography ==
=== Film ===
Year	Title	Role	Notes
2000	Malicious Intent	Barmaid	(Debut role)
2010	Glory	Laura	Short film
2012	Remains	Eva	Short film
2013	The Food Guide to Love	Maureen	
2013	Philomena	Bridie	Film nominated for 4 Oscars, including Best Picture
2013	Stay	Deirdre McGilloway	
2015	Lost in the Living	Grace	(Uncredited)
2015	Traders	Orla	
2016	Mammal	Ann Marie	
2016	The Secret Scripture	Chrissie	
2020	Wildfire	Kelly	Posthumous release Final role *WON* IFTA for Best Lead Actress in Film

=== Television ===
Year	Title	Role	Notes
2007	The Tudors	Chambermaid	S01E03 – Episode: 'Wolsey, Wolsey, Wolsey!'
2009	Hollyoaks: The Morning After the Night Before	Ruby	TV series
2009	Mid Life Christmas	Cranchesterford teenager	Television film
2010	Dani's House	Belle Charlotte	S03E12 – Episode: 'Buddy Movie'
2014	Undeniable	Miss Maclean	Miniseries - Ep. #2
2014	Play Next Door	Dyla	S01E02 – Episode: 'If Those Lips'
2016–2018	Can't Cope, Won't Cope	Danielle Mullane	Main cast 12 episodes

== Awards and nominations ==
Year	Award	Category	Work	Result	Ref
2021	IFTA Awards	Lead Actress in a Film	Wildfire	Won	
