= Wildfire (2020 film) =

2020 Irish drama thriller

- Directed by: Cathy Brady
- Written by: Cathy Brady
- Produced by: Carlo Cresto-Dina; Charles Steel; David Collins (producer)
- Starring: Nika McGuigan; Nora-Jane Noone; Martin McCann; Kate Dickie
- Cinematography: Crystel Fournier
- Edited by: Matteo Bini
- Music by: Gareth Averill; Matthew James Kelly
- Production companies: Tempesta Film UK; Cowboy Films; Samson Films
- Release date: September 2020 (Toronto)
- Countries: Ireland; United Kingdom
- Language: English

Wildfire is a 2020 Irish drama thriller film directed by Cathy Brady. It is about two reunited sisters (Nora-Jane Noone, Nika McGuigan) who discover secrets from their mother's past. It was acquired by Modern Films for distribution in the UK. Martin McCann and Kate Dickie also star in supporting roles.

The film has received critical praise for its direction, writing, and performances, particularly that of the late McGuigan. Metacritic, which uses a weighted average, assigned the film a score of 72 out of 100, based on six critics, indicating "generally favorable" reviews. The film holds a 95% approval rating on Rotten Tomatoes. The critical consensus on Rotten Tomatoes reads, "Anchored by the believable bond between its leads, Wildfire tells a heartfelt and realistic story of sisters peering into their family's past." It was in the Great 8 Showcase at the Cannes Film Festival and debuted in the Discovery Showcase at the 2020 Toronto International Film Festival. It won the IWC Schaffhausen Filmmaker Bursary Award at the London BFI Film Festival. The award is worth £50k, for outstanding first or second time UK writer, director or writer/director presenting work at the BFI London Film Festival.

McGuigan was posthumously honoured with the Lead Actress - Film award at the Irish Film & Television Academy (IFTA) Film & Drama Awards for her final performance in this film.
