= Herself (film) =

- Film poster
- Directed by: Phyllida Lloyd
- Written by: Malcolm Campbell; Clare Dunne
- Produced by: Rory Gilmartin; Ed Guiney; Sharon Horgan
- Starring: Clare Dunne; Harriet Walter; Conleth Hill
- Cinematography: Tom Comerford
- Edited by: Rebecca Lloyd
- Music by: Natalie Holt
- Production companies: Fís Éirann/Screen Ireland; BBC Films; BFI; Cornerstone Films; Element Pictures; Merman Films
- Distributed by: Picturehouse Entertainment (United Kingdom); Element Pictures (Ireland)
- Release date: 24 January 2020 (Sundance)
- Running time: 97 minutes
- Countries: United Kingdom; Ireland
- Language: English

Herself is a 2020 drama film directed by Phyllida Lloyd, from a screenplay by Malcolm Campbell and Clare Dunne. The film stars Dunne, Harriet Walter and Conleth Hill.

Herself had its world premiere at the Sundance Film Festival on 24 January 2020 and was released in the United States in a limited release on 30 December 2020, followed by digital streaming on Amazon Prime Video on 8 January 2021 by Amazon Studios.

== Premise ==
Single mother Sandra has been struggling to get by with her two young daughters after leaving her abusive husband. Housed in state-funded hotel accommodation, Sandra decides to build her own house with the help of a friendly community and a handful of new friends. With this new purpose, Sandra rediscovers herself: that is until her abusive former husband sues her for custody of the children.

== Cast ==
- Clare Dunne as Sandra
- Harriet Walter as Peggy
- Conleth Hill as Aido
- Molly McCann as Molly
- Ruby Rose O'Hara as Emma
- Cathy Belton as Jo
- Rebecca O'Mara as Grainne
- Ericka Roe as Amy
- Ian Lloyd Anderson as Gary
- Seán Duggan as Ciaran Crowley
- Aaron Lockhart as Tomo
- Anita Petry as Rosa
- Dmitry Vinokurov as Dariusz
- Mabel Chah as Yewande

== Production ==
In March 2019, it was announced Phyllida Lloyd would direct the film, from a screenplay by Malcolm Campbell and Clare Dunne, and that Dunne would also star in the film. In April 2019, Conleth Hill and Harriet Walter joined the cast of the film.

== Release ==
It had its world premiere at the Sundance Film Festival on 24 January 2020. Shortly after, Amazon Studios acquired U.S. distribution rights to the film. It was released in the United States in a limited release on 30 December 2020, followed by digital streaming on Amazon Prime Video on 8 January 2021.

== Reception ==
On review aggregator Rotten Tomatoes, the film holds an approval rating of 93% based on 136 reviews, with an average rating of 7.2/10. The website's critics consensus reads: "Sensitively directed by Phyllida Lloyd and brought to life by co-writer Clare Dunne's stunning performance, Herself charts one woman's journey with empathy and grace." Metacritic reports a score of 71 out of 100, based on 19 critic reviews, indicating "generally favorable reviews".
