= Clare Dunne (Irish actress) =

Irish actress (born 1988)

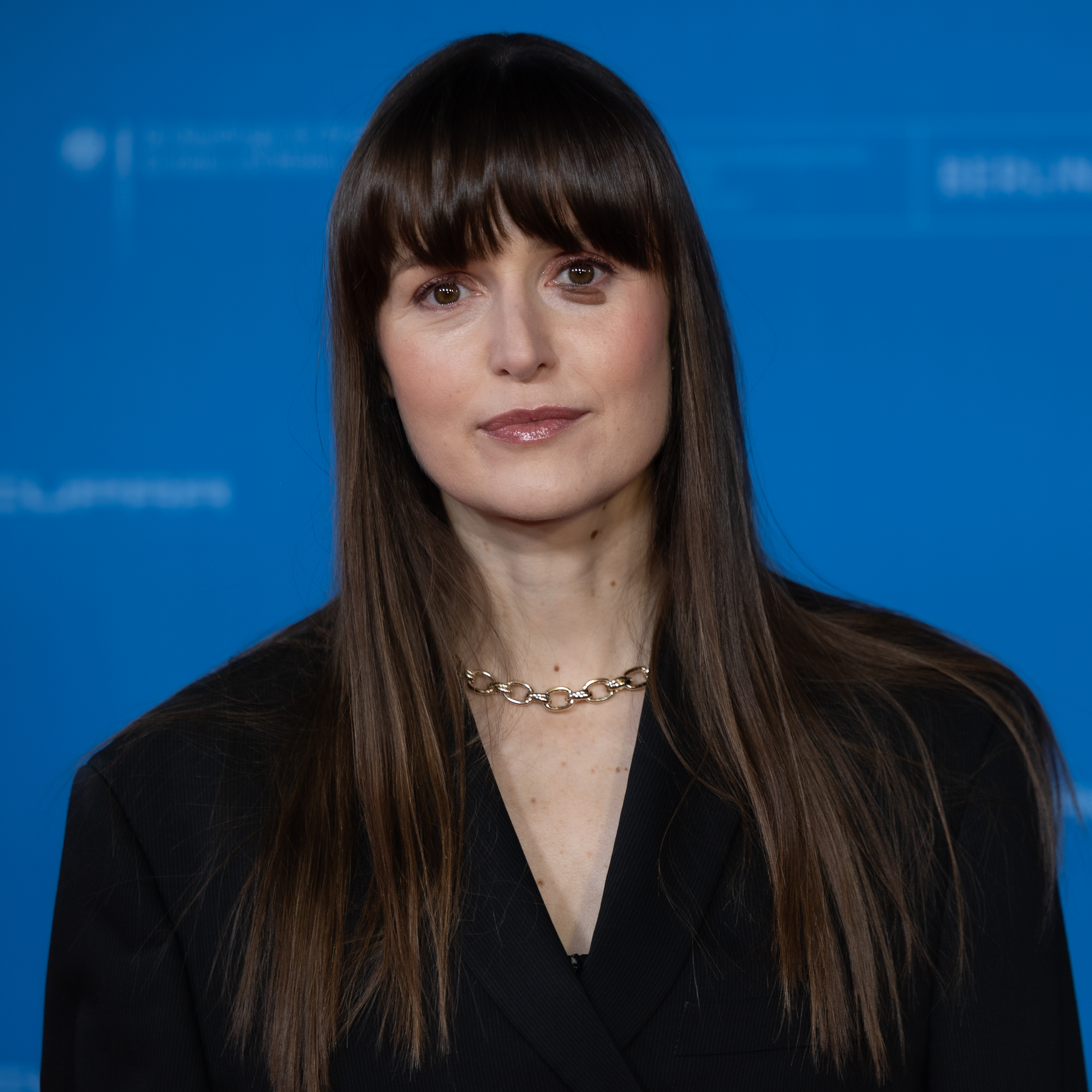
- Dunne in 2026
- Born: April 10, 1988 (age 38); Dublin, Ireland
- Education: Royal Welsh College of Music & Drama
- Occupation: Actress

Clare Dunne (born 1988) is an Irish actress, born in Dublin. She has appeared in stage roles with the Abbey Theatre and the National Theatre. Dunne is known for the distinctive birthmark under her left eye.

== Career ==
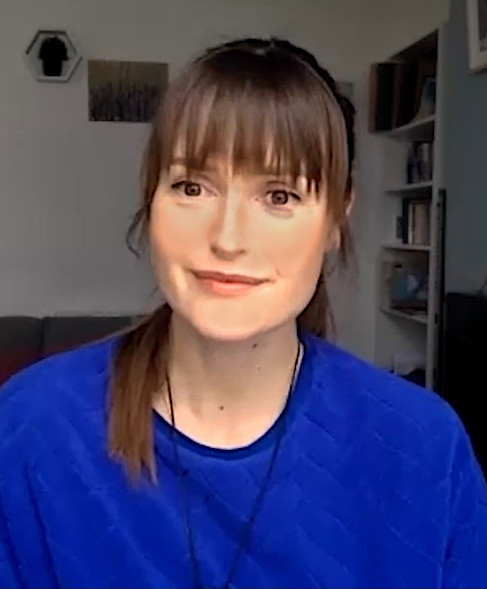
Dunne in 2022

Dunne's work at the Abbey Theatre includes Juno and the Paycock (a co-production between the Abbey Theatre and the National Theatre). Other theatre work includes The Cripple of Inishmaan, The Silver Tassie, Druid 35 and The Playboy of the Western World (Druid), Julius Caesar (Donmar Warehouse), Detroit (National Theatre), Three Sisters (Lyric Hammersmith and Filter), A Midsummer Night's Dream (Filter at Latitude) and Crunch (Nabakov). Dunne wrote and performed Living with Missy (Smock Alley Theatre). Radio work includes On Her Majesty's Service and News from Home (BBC Radio 4). Dunne graduated from the Royal Welsh College of Music & Drama, Cardiff, in 2009.

Dunne played Prince Hal in the Donmar Warehouse and St. Ann's Warehouse all-female version of Shakespeare's Henry IV, directed by Phyllida Lloyd.

In 2015, Dunne starred in Grounded, by George Brant, in the Dublin Fringe Festival.

Dunne's film work includes the shorts The Cherishing (2016) and Nice Night for It (2017).

She portrayed Victoria in Spider-Man: Far From Home (2019). Dunne then co-wrote and starred as Sandra in Herself (2020), which reunited her with director Phyllida Lloyd.

== Filmography ==
=== Film ===
Year	Title	Role	Notes
2019	Spider-Man: Far From Home	Victoria	
2020	Herself	Sandra	Also screenwriter
2021	The Last Duel	Celia	
2024	Small Things Like These	Sister Carmel	
2024	Kathleen Is Here	Dee	
2026	The Education of Jane Cumming	Marianne Woods	
2026	500 Miles	Julie	

=== Television ===
Year	Title	Role	Notes
2021–2023	Kin	Amanda Kinsella	Main role; 16 episodes
2022	Witness Number 3	Detective Whelan	4 episodes
2025	The Wheel of Time	Galina Casban	3 episodes
