= Cathy Brady =

Irish film director and screenwriter

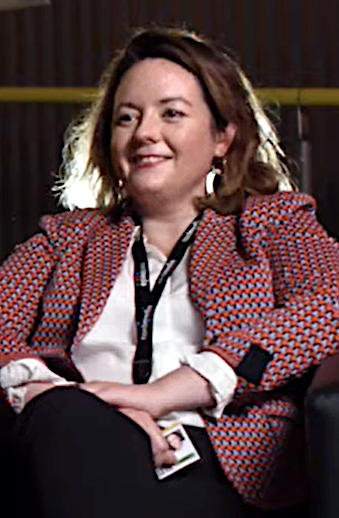
Cathy Brady at BIFF 2021

Cathy Brady is a Northern-Ireland born film director and screenwriter. After directing several award-winning short films and some television episodes in the 2010s, she wrote and directed her first feature film, Wildfire in 2020.

She studied visual arts at Dún Laoghaire Institute of Art, Design and Technology (IADT) but became interested in film and transferred to the National Film School of Ireland to complete her degree. She has an MA in directing fiction from the National Film and Television School (NFTS).

She grew up in Newry in Northern Ireland and lives in St Leonards-on-Sea, Sussex, England with her dachshund dog Betty. She chose to live in Sussex because she "didn't want to be typecast as an Irish film-maker".

== Selected filmography ==
- Small Change (2010, short)
- Rough Skin (2011, shown in Channel 4's Coming Up series)
- Kiss (2012, short)
- Morning (2012, short)
- Wasted (2013, short)
- Wildfire (2020, feature)

=== Television work ===
- Glue (one episode, 2014)
- Can't Cope, Won't Cope (six episodes, 2016)

== Awards ==
Small Change (2010) won "Best first short by an Irish director" at the 2010 Cork International Film Festival (CIFF), "Best short film" at the Dublin International Film Festival (DIFF), and "Best short film" at the IFTA Film & Drama Awards (IFTAs). Morning (2012) won the "Best short film" IFTA, the "XX" award of the 2013 Underwire Film Festival and the Prix UIP Cork (European Short Film) at the CIFF. Wasted competed at the 2013 Edinburgh International Film Festival.

Wildfire won Brady the 2021 British Independent Film Award for Best Debut Screenwriter, and she was also nominated for British Independent Film Award – The Douglas Hickox Award for a debut director. At the 2020 BFI London Film Festival she won the IWC Schaffhausen Filmmaker Bursary Award of £50,000, awarded to a first or second-time director.
