= Nora-Jane Noone =

Irish actress

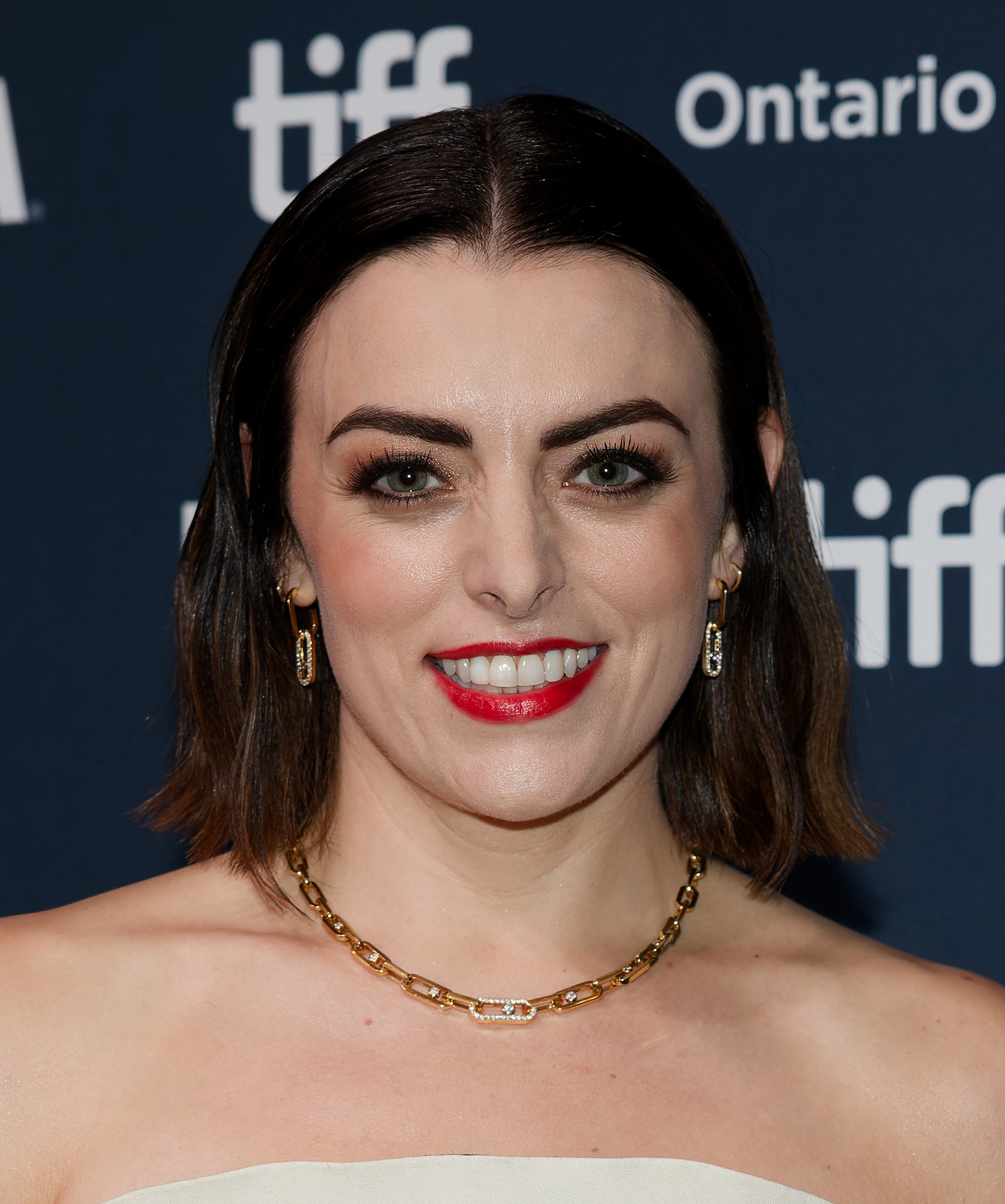
- Noone at the 2024 Toronto International Film Festival
- Born: 8 March 1984 (age 42); Galway, Ireland
- Education: National University of Ireland, Galway
- Occupation: Actress
- Years active: 2002–present
- Spouse: Chris Marquette
- Children: 1

Nora-Jane Noone (born 8 March 1984) is an Irish actress. In 2020, The Irish Times ranked her 47th on its list of the greatest Irish film actors of all time. She made her screen debut in her breakthrough role film The Magdalene Sisters (2002), and has since been nominated three times at the IFTA Film & Drama Awards for her work in 3 films: The Descent (2005), Savage (2009) and Wildfire (2020).

Her other credits include Doomsday (2008), Ella Enchanted (2004), The Ipcress File (2022), and Hidden Assets (2023).

== Early life and education ==
Noone grew up in Upper Newcastle, Galway City. She trained for two years at the Performing Arts School in Galway, and is a proficient musician (piano to Grade 7 level) and dancer. Her previous acting role before starting her acting career, was in school and amateur productions and pantomime.

She graduated in 2004 from NUI Galway with a degree in Science, and then moved to London.

== Career ==
Noone made her professional film debut playing Bernadette in the Peter Mullan written and directed film The Magdalene Sisters (2002). The film won the Best Film prize in the 2002 Venice Film Festival, and was nominated as Best British Picture at the British Academy Film Awards. For her performance as Bernadette, Noone was nominated for British Newcomer of the Year at the 2004 London Film Critics' Circle Awards, alongside Mullan, who won best director and best film of the year.

In 2005, she was nominated for Best Supporting Actress in a Feature Film for her role as Holly in The Descent (2005) at the 3rd Irish Film & Television Awards. and was nominated again in 2010, Best Actress in a Supporting Role Film for her role in the film Savage (2009).

In 2008, she co-starred in Doomsday, directed by Neil Marshall, Speed Dating and Ella Enchanted. Other work includes the short films News for the Church written and directed by Andrew McCarthy and The Listener, directed by Michael Chang. Noone also recorded Walking at Ringsend for BBC Radio 4. In 2008, Noone appeared in Insatiable.

Noone has also appeared in The Descent Part 2, The Day of the Triffids and The Runaway and she has co-starred in episodes 1–6 in season one of Jack Taylor. In 2013 she also began writing a film short.

In 2020, Noone received a nomination Best Actress in a Leading Role Film at the 17th Irish Film & Television Awards for her performance as Lauren in Wildfire. In 2022, she was involved in the relaunch of The Ipcress File, as Dr Karen Newton.

In 2023, she returned to Ireland as Detective Sergeant Claire Wallace in the RTÉ crime series Hidden Assets.

== Personal life ==
In 2023, she moved back to live in Galway whilst filming Hidden Assets. She and her husband, fellow actor Chris Marquette, had a daughter in 2020. This was one reason that Noone decided to return to Ireland.

== Filmography ==
=== Film ===
Year	Title	Role	Notes
2002	The Magdalene Sisters	Bernadette	LFCC British Newcomer of the Year
2004	Ella Enchanted	Fairy No. 1	
2004	News for the Church	Girl	Short film
2004	The Listener	Woman	Short film
2005	The Descent	Holly	Nom - IFTA Best Supporting Actress in a Feature Film
2007	Speed Dating	Juliet Van Der Bexton	
2008	Doomsday	Read	
2008	Beyond the Rave	Jen	Direct-to-video
2008	Insatiable	Ellie	
2009	Stranded	Josie	Short film
2009	The Bus Driver		Short film
2009	Through the Night	Lil	Short film
2009	Legend of the Bog	Saiorse Reilly	
2009	Savage	Michelle	Nom - IFTA Best Actress in a Supporting Role Film
2009	The Descent Part 2	Holly	Cameo Appearance
2010	Small Change	Karen	Short film
2011	January	Kathrine	
2011	Mixed Marriage	Nora Murray	Theatre
2012	Wasted		Short film
2012	Taking the Boat	Maeve	Short film
2013	Deception	Aoife Stacey	
2015	Brand New-U	Nadia	
2015	Brooklyn	Sheila	
2015	Estranged	Kathrine	
2017	12 Feet Deep	Bree	
2017	The Capture	Alex	
2019	Darlin'	Jennifer	
2020	I Am Normal	Keira	Short film
2020	Wildfire	Lauren	Nom - ITFA Best Actress in a Leading Role Film
2020	I Hate the Man in My Basement	Kyra	
2024	Bring Them Down	Caroline	

=== Television ===
Year	Title	Role	Notes
2005	Coronation Street	Louise Hazel	9 episodes
2005	Holby City	Daryl O'Connor	1 episode: "Bird on a Wire"
2006	Afterlife	Tessa	1 episode: "Roadside Bouquets"
2009	The Day of the Triffids	Lucy	TV miniseries
2010	Jack Taylor	Garda Kate Noonan	6 episodes
2011	The Runaway	Caitlin	4 episodes
2011	Garrow's Law	Catherine Quinn	1 episode: "Episode 3.2"
2011	Jack Taylor: The Pikemen	Garda Kate Noonan	TV movie
2011	Jack Taylor: The Magdalen Martyrs	Garda Kate Noonan	TV movie
2013	Atlantis	Atalanta	1 episode: "Episode 1.10"
2013	Jack Taylor: The Dramatist	Garda Kate Noonan	TV movie
2013	Jack Taylor: Priest	Garda Kate Noonan	TV movie
2013	Jack Taylor: Shot Down	Garda Kate Noonan	TV movie
2022	The Ipcress File	Dr Karen Newton	2 episodes
2023	Hidden Assets	Detective Sergeant Claire Wallace	12 episodes

== Awards and nominations ==
Year	Award	Category	Work	Result	Ref.
2004	London Film Critics' Circle Award	British/IrishNewcomer of the Year	The Magdalene Sisters	Nominated	
2005	Irish Film & Television Academy Award	Best Supporting Actress in a Feature Film	The Descent	Nominated	
2010	Irish Film & Television Academy Award	Best Actress in a Supporting Role Film	Savage	Nominated	
2021	Irish Film & Television Academy Award	Best Actress in a Leading Role Film	Wildfire	Nominated	
