= The Vanishing Triangle =

- Created by: Ivan Kavanagh
- Directed by: Imogen Murphy
- Countries of origin: Ireland; United States
- Original language: English
- No. of seasons: 1
- No. of episodes: 6

Production
- Executive producers: Alon Aranya; Adam Barth; Ana Habajec; Patrick Irwin; Allen Leech; AnneMarie Naughton; Lucy Roberts
- Production companies: 87 Films; Paper Plane Productions; Park Films; Screen Ireland

Original release
- Network: Virgin Media One (Ireland); Sundance Now (United States)
- Release: 26 October 2023 – present

The Vanishing Triangle is a six-part television series created by Ivan Kavanagh. It is a dramatisation of true stories from Ireland's Vanishing Triangle. Distributed by Eccho Rights, it premiered on Sundance Now in the United States on 29 October 2023, and aired on Virgin Media One in Ireland on 25 March 2024 and Acorn TV in the United Kingdom on 29 April.

It premiered on Australian television on Thursday 7 March 2024, on SBS.

Channel 5 will broadcast the series under the name The Vanishings from 6 February 2025.

== Cast ==
=== Main ===
- India Mullen as Lisa Wallace, investigative journalist
- Allen Leech as David Burkely, detective
- Aaron Monaghan as Gareth Brennan
- Laoise Sweeney as Susan Reynolds
- Derbhle Crotty as Barbara Adams
- Philip O'Sullivan as DCS Gill
- Gráinne Good as Amy Reynolds
- Brian Moore as Mark Bulger
- Jana Mohieden as Mandy Clarke
- Adam John Richardson as Tommy Stephens
- Stuart Dunne as Chris Wallace
- Stephen Hogan as Ger Gough

=== Recurring ===
- Maura Foley as Janice Wallace
- Jason Daly as Jimmy
- Kiera Crawford as Rachel Burkely
- Fionnuala Murphy as Francis Reynolds
- Sarah Carroll as Mary Burkely
- Peter Corboy as Liam Benson

== Episodes ==
| No. | Title | Directed by | Written by | Original release date |
|---|---|---|---|---|
| 1 | "Episode 1" | Imogen Murphy | Ivan Kavanagh | 26 October 2023 |
| 2 | "Episode 2" | Imogen Murphy | Rachel Anthony & Ivan Kavanagh | 26 October 2023 |
| 3 | "Episode 3" | Imogen Murphy | Ivan Kavanagh & Sally Tatchell | 2 November 2023 |
| 4 | "Episode 4" | Imogen Murphy | Rachel Anthony & Ivan Kavanagh | 9 November 2023 |
| 5 | "Episode 5" | Imogen Murphy | Ivan Kavanagh | 16 November 2023 |
| 6 | "Episode 6" | Laura Way | Ivan Kavanagh | 23 November 2023 |

== Production ==
=== Development ===
The Vanishing Triangle was originally developed by Park Films and Screen Ireland. 87 Films and Paper Planes Productions boarded the project as it was commissioned by Virgin Media One and SundanceNow. The series is created by Ivan Kavanagh, and co-written with Sally Tatchell and Rachel Anthony. Executive producers include actor Allen Leech, AnneMarie Naughton and Ana Habajec of Park Films, Patrick Irwin of 87 Films, Alon Aranya of Paper Plane Productions, and Adam Barth and Lucy Robert of Eccho Rights.

=== Casting ===
In September 2022, it was announced Allen Leech and India Mullen would lead the series. Maura Foley and Kiera Crawford also joined the cast.

=== Filming ===
Filming was reported in Bray, County Wicklow in October 2022.
