= Stephen McKeon =

Irish composer

- Born: Ireland
- Genres: Film and television scores, orchestral, experimental, ambient, drone
- Occupation: Composer
- Instruments: Piano, keyboards, guitar, percussion, violin, cello
- Years active: 1994-present

Stephen McKeon is an Irish composer of film and television soundtrack music.

== Career ==
McKeon has received two Irish Film and Television Awards, both for John Boorman films, The Tiger's Tail in 2007 and Queen & Country in 2015, and was previously nominated for Blind Flight, Savage, and the children's animated film Niko 2 - Little Brother, Big Trouble. His other notable credits include Niko & the Way to the Stars, Ooops! Noah Is Gone..., Norm of the North, Pilgrimage, The Hole in the Ground, The Cellar, Evil Dead Rise, One Last Deal and Lee Cronin's The Mummy. He is also a frequent collaborator with directors Brendan Muldowney, Lee Cronin, Christine Molloy and Joe Lawlor.

McKeon has also worked on several television series, including an episode of Black Mirror and the fourth and fifth seasons of Primeval. He is a multi-instrumentalist whose work covers a wide spectrum from large orchestral scores to ambient guitar-based music such as that written for the Scottish BAFTA winning film Summer.

== Filmography ==
Year	Title	Director(s)	Studio(s)	Notes
1995	Korea	Cathal Black	Black Star Films; Cathal Black Films; De Facto Film and Video	—N/a
1996	The Boy from Mercury	Martin Duffy	Clarence	—N/a
1998	The Nephew	Eugene Brady	United International Pictures	—N/a
1998	The American	Paul Unwin	BBC Films	Television film
1999	Sweety Barrett	Stephen Bradley	Warner Bros.-Seven Arts	—N/a
1999	Carnivale	Deane Taylor	BAC Films; Capitol Films	First score for an animated film
1999	A Secret Affair	Bobby Roth	CBS	Television film
2000	Borstal Boy	Peter Sheridan	Strand Releasing	—N/a
2000	Der Runner	Micky Rowitz	ProSieben	Television film
2002	Random Passage	John N. Smith	CBC	Television miniseries
2003	Cowboys & Angels	David Gleeson	Buena Vista International	—N/a
2003	Blind Flight	John Furse	Makar Productions; Parallax Pictures	Irish Film and Television Award winner
2003	The Clinic	—N/a	RTÉ One	Television series
2006	The Tiger's Tail	John Boorman	Merlin Films; Fern Gully Tales	First collaboration with John Boorman; Irish Film and Television Award winner
2006	Battleplan	—N/a	Military Channel	Television series
2007	The Old Curiosity Shop	Brian Percival	ITV	Television film
2008	Niko & the Way to the Stars	Michael Hegner; Kari Juusonen	Nordisk Film	First collaboration with Kari Juusonen
2008	Wired	—N/a	ITV	Television series
2008	Summer	Kenneth Glenaan	Vertigo Films; Contender Entertainment Group	—N/a
2009	Seamus Heaney - Out of the Marvellous	Charlie McCarthy	Icebox Films	Documentary film
2009	Savage	Brendan Muldowney	TLA Releasing	First collaboration with Brendan Muldowney; Irish Film and Television Award nominee
2010	Jack Taylor	—N/a	TV3	Television series
2011	Primeval	—N/a	ITV	Television series, seasons 4-5
2011	Hattie	Dan Zeff	BBC Four	Television film
2011	Legends of Valhalla: Thor	Oskar Jonasson; Toby Genkel; Gunnar Karlsson	Telepool	First collaboration with Toby Genkel
2011	Black Mirror	Euros Lyn	Channel 4	1 episode, Fifteen Million Merits
2012	Little Brother, Big Trouble: A Christmas Adventure	Kari Juusonen; Jorgen Lerdam	Nordisk Film	Second collaboration with Kari Juusonen; Irish Film and Television Award nominee
2013	Love and Marriage	—N/a	ITV	Television series
2013	Mister John	Christine Molloy; Joe Lawlor	Artificial Eye	First collaboration with Christine Molloy and Joe Lawlor
2014	Queen and Country	John Boorman	BBC Worldwide	Second collaboration with John Boorman; Irish Film and Television Award winner
2015	Ooops! Noah Is Gone...	Toby Genkel	Wild Bunch	Second collaboration with Toby Genkel
2016	Norm of the North	Trevor Wall	Lionsgate	—N/a
2016	The Flag	Declan Recks	Treasure Entertainment	—N/a
2017	Pilgrimage	Brendan Muldowney	RLJE Films	Second collaboration with Brendan Muldowney
2019	The Hole in the Ground	Lee Cronin	Wildcard Distribution	First collaboration with Lee Cronin
2019	Rose Plays Julie	Christine Molloy; Joe Lawlor	Screen Ireland	Second collaboration with Christine Molloy and Joe Lawlor
2019	Nuclear	Catherine Linstrum	101 Films	—N/a
2021	As Luck Would Have It	Clare Niederpruem	Hallmark Channel	Television film
2021	Much Ado About Christmas	Michael Damian	GAC Family	Television film
2022	The Cellar	Brendan Muldowney	Shudder; RLJE Films	Third collaboration with Brendan Muldowney
2023	Kin	Felix Thompson; Christine Molloy and Joe Lawlor; Kate Dolan	RTÉ One	Television series, season 2
2023	Evil Dead Rise	Lee Cronin	Warner Bros. Pictures; New Line Cinema	Second collaboration with Lee Cronin
2023	Apocalypse Clown	George Kane	Vertigo Films	—N/a
2023	Baltimore	Christine Molloy; Joe Lawlor	Bankside Films	Third collaboration with Christine Molloy and Joe Lawlor
2024	The Red King	Daniel O'Hara; Lisa Clarke	U&Alibi	Television series
2024	The Damned	Thordur Palsson	Vertical	—N/a
2024	Sharp Corner	Jason Buxton	Elevation Pictures	—N/a
2024	The Hardacres	Rachel Carey; Kieron J. Walsh	Channel 5	Television series
2026	One Last Deal	Brendan Muldowney	Wildcard Distribution	Fourth collaboration with Brendan Muldowney
2026	Lee Cronin's The Mummy	Lee Cronin	Warner Bros. Pictures; New Line Cinema	Third collaboration with Lee Cronin
