= Andrew Bennett (actor) =

Irish actor

- Born: Limerick City, Ireland
- Occupation: Actor
- Years active: 1979-Present
- Known for: The Quiet Girl

Andrew Bennett is an Irish actor from Limerick City, Ireland. His career has spanned three decades and he has appeared in films such as Savage, Angela's Ashes, The Cellar and the Academy Award nominated film, The Quiet Girl.

== Early life ==
Andrew was born in Limerick City, Ireland but his family moved to Crecora, Killaloe, County Clare when he was a young boy. He moved to Dublin at 23, to attend college.

== Career ==
Bennett started his career starring in the 1979 film Black Jack, playing Hatch. In 1998, he starred in The General, directed by John Boorman. That same year, he appeared in the Canadian film This Is My Father as Mr. Kearney. Andrew was the narrator for the 1999 film Angela's Ashes, directed by Alan Parker and based off the memoir by Frank McCourt. He played Big Kevin in the 2013 feature The Stag, directed by John Butler.

In 2022, Andrew appeared in a supporting role in The Quiet Girl, a coming of age drama, written & directed by Colm Bairéad. The film received critical praise and was nominated for an Academy Award in 2023. Bennett claimed the nomination made him feel like he was part of "the Italia 90 team". Bennett received a nomination for Best Supporting Actor at the CinEuphoria Awards. The film was a winner at the Dublin International Film Festival.

In 2024, Bennett appeared as 'Donal Riley' in the RTÉ crime series Blackshore. Additionally that year, he appeared in the theatre production 'Heaven', which toured across Ireland and the UK. In 2025, Bennett took part in the RTÉ Short Story Competition, reading 'Feeding Time'. In 2025, Bennett once again performed for the RTÉ, this time in "The Four Faced Liar", by Ger FitzGibbon. Other on screen appearances include Small Town, Big Story (2025-BBC) The Cellar (2022) and in 2026, David Gleeson's Once Upon a Time in a Cinema. Theatre credits include "Embers" (2019) and "Lolita" (2002).

== Filmography ==
Year	Title	Role	Type
1979	Black Jack	Hatch	Feature
1991	Pirate Island	Policeman	TV Movie
1996	Quickfix	Harry	Short
1997	Alaska	Actor	Short
1998	The General	Hollyfield Priest	Feature
1998	This Is My Father	Mr. Kearney	Feature
1999	The Ambassador	Custody Officer	TV Series
1999	Angela's Ashes	Narrator (voice)	Feature
2000	Saltwater	Garda	Feature
2000	Paths to Freedom	Garda	TV Series
2002	On Home Ground	Doctor Costello	TV Series
2003	If Your Not In, You Can't Win!	Self-Narrator	TV Movie
2005	Pure Mule	Oliver Brennan	TV Series
2006	Building A House	Fessington	Short
2007	Single-Handed	Radio D.J	TV Series
2007	Garage	Sully	Feature
2007	Red Mist	Self-Misc (voice)	TV Movie
2007	The Clinic	Noel O'Loughlin	TV Series
2008	Little White Lie	John	TV Movie
2009	Savage	Detective O'Neill	Feature
2009	Zonad	Mr. Madigan	Feature
2010	Your Bad Self	Actor	TV Series
2010	Crossword	(voice)	Short
2010	Love/Hate	Peter	TV Series
2011	Pentecost	Quinn	Short
2011	The Importance of Being Whatever	Larry	TV Series
2011	Mattie	Sgt Fronsie Sullivan	TV Series
2012	Immaturity for Charity	Various	TV Movie
2012	Silence	Self-Bartender	Feature
2013	Foyle's War	Dr. Trevelyan	TV Series
2013	Scèal	Cathal	TV Series
2013	Mister John	John Devine	Feature
2013	The Stag	Big Kevin	Feature
2013	Damo and Ivor	Detective Murray	TV Series
2014	Noble	Dicky Clark	Feature
2012-2014	Moone Boy	Mr. Jackson	TV Series
2014	Edward & Arlette	Edward	Short
2016	Storyland	Store Manager	TV Series
2016	Eipic	Aengus	TV Series
2016	The Apparel	Joseph	Short
2016	Trial of the Centuary	Sebastian Banks	TV Series
2016	The Flag	Schooner	Feature
2017	The Box	Niall	Short
2018	Black '47	Beartla	Feature
2019	Rebellion	Arthur Griffith	TV Series
2019	The Hole in the Ground	Doctor	Feature
2019	Resistance	Arthur Griffith	TV Series
2019	Headcases	Peter	TV Series
2020	Dating Amber	Captain Rory	TV Series
2020	Le Cleangal	Pàdraig	TV Series
2020	A Death in the Family	Pete	Short
2020	Finding Joy	Priest	TV Series
2021	The Queen v Patrick O'Donnell	A.M Sullivan	Short
2021	The Passion	Dad	Short
2022	The Cellar	Detective Brophy	Feature
2022	State of Flux	Arthur Griffith	TV Series
2022	Arte Journal	Self	TV Series
2022	The Quiet Girl	Sèan	Feature
2022	The Cry of Granuaile	Eoghan	Feature
2022	God's Creatures	Garda Mike	Feature
2023	Umbrella Sky	Clown	Feature
2024	Blackshore	Donal Riley	TV Series
2025	Blue Moon	Oklahoma City Major	Feature
2025	Small Town, Big Story	Barry Battles	TV Series
2025	Whitetail	Daniel	Feature
2025-2026	Cooper and Fry	Michael Hebden	TV Series
2026	Once Upon a Time in a Cinema	Sgt Walsh	Feature
2026	Nana	Couple 2	Short
2026	The Lost Children of Tuam	Aidan Corless	Feature
