= Ann Skelly =

Irish actress (born 1996)

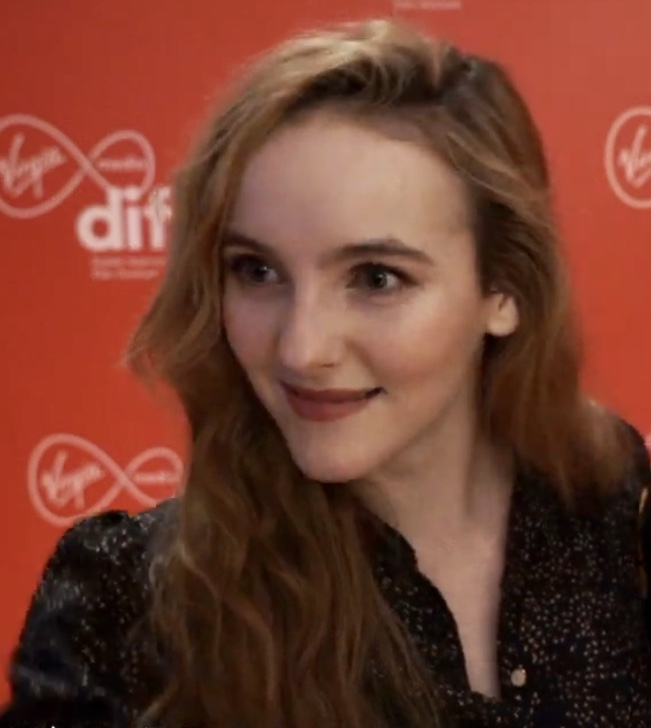
- Skelly at the 2020 Dublin International Film Festival
- Born: Ann Skelly; 6 December 1996 (age 29); Wexford, Ireland
- Occupation: Actress
- Years active: 2015–present
- Partner: Iain De Caestecker (2021–present)

Ann Skelly (born 6 December 1996) is an Irish actress. She received IFTA nominations for her performances in the film Kissing Candice (2017) and the miniseries Death and Nightingales (2018). She is also known for her roles in the crime drama Red Rock (2015–2019), the film Rose Plays Julie (2019), and the HBO series The Nevers (2021).

== Early life and education ==
Skelly was born in Dublin and moved to County Wexford as a toddler, first to Ballycanew, then to Oylegate, and later to Kilmuckridge. She went to Coláiste Bríde in Enniscorthy and was homeschooled during her Leaving Cert. She attended the Irish Film Academy's weekend acting classes as a teen. She later trained at Bow Street Academy, graduating in 2017.

== Career ==
Skelly began her acting career in 2015 when she made her television debut in the serial crime drama series Red Rock as Rachel Reid. She made guest appearances on many television programs, most notably Rebellion (2016) and Little Women (2017). Skelly played the lead character named Candice in the drama movie Kissing Candice directed by Aoife McArdle, she was nominated for the Best Actress in a Lead Role – Film and Rising Star in 2018 Irish Film & Television Awards.

In 2018, Skelly starred alongside Jamie Dornan and Matthew Rhys in the historical drama miniseries Death and Nightingales, based on the 1992 novel of the same name by author Eugene McCabe, where she played the lead character named Beth Winters, a stepdaughter to Billy Winters and a daughter of Catherine Winters, she was nominated for the Best Actress in a Lead Role – Drama in 2021 Irish Film & Television Awards. From 2018 to 2019, she had a recurring role in the historical drama series Vikings as Lady Ethelfled, the daughter of King Edward and was the wife of Prince Aethelred. She starred in the 2019 drama film Rose Plays Julie directed by Joe Lawlor and Christine Molloy, which was released on 3 October 2019.

Skelly was cast to play one of the lead roles, Penance Adair, in the sci-fi drama series The Nevers.

== Personal life ==
Skelly has been in a relationship with Scottish actor Iain De Caestecker since 2021.

== Filmography ==
=== Film ===
Year	Title	Role	Notes
2017	Kissing Candice	Candice	
2019	Rose Plays Julie	Rose	
2024	Four Letters of Love	Isabel Gore	

=== Television ===
Year	Title	Role	Notes
2015–2019	Red Rock	Rachel Reid	Main role
2016	Rebellion	Biddy Lambert	2 episodes
2017	Playground	Hannah Baylor	Main role
2017	Little Women	Annie Moffat	1 episode
2018	Death and Nightingales	Beth Winters	Main role
2018–2019	Vikings	Lady Ethelfled	Recurring character
2021–2023	The Nevers	Penance Adair	Main role
2022	100 years of Ulysses	Narrator	
2025	The Sandman	Nuala	Recurring Character
2025	House of Guinness	Adelaide Guinness	
2026	Honey	Martha Schmitt	Main role

== Awards and nominations ==
Year	Award	Category	Work	Result	Ref.
2018	Irish Film and Television Awards	Best Actress in a Lead Role – Film	Kissing Candice	Nominated	
2018	Irish Film and Television Awards	Rising Star	Kissing Candice	Nominated	
2020	Irish Film and Television Awards	Best Actress in a Lead Role – Drama	Death and Nightingales	Nominated	
