= Diarmuid Larkin =

Irish artist and art educationist

- Born: 1 April 1918 (age 108); Dublin, Ireland
- Died: 25 June 1989 (aged 71); Dún Laoghaire, Dublin, Ireland
- Burial place: Shanganagh Cemetery, Dublin, Ireland; 53.22213°N 6.11798°W
- Education: National College of Art; Real Academia de Bellas Artes de San Fernando
- Occupations: Artist; professor of art
- Years active: 1953–1989
- Era: 20th century
- Notable work: Armageddon; Wolfhound; Wicklow
- Children: 7, including Seán

Diarmuid Larkin (1 April 1918 – 25 June 1989) was an Irish artist and art educationist. He was predominantly a painter of landscapes, although his work became more abstract over time.

== Early life and education ==
Diarmuid Larkin was born on 1 April 1918 in Dublin, the eldest of three children of Maura Larkin (née Noonan) and John Larkin (also known as Seán Ó Lorcáin). Despite showing early signs of talent and wishing to become an artist, his father opposed it and apprenticed him as a lithographer with the Dublin Illustrating Company. In 1941, he entered the school of painting at the National College of Art. While there, he worked with several distinguished artists, including Harry Kernoff, Norah McGuinness, and Maurice MacGonigal. After graduating in 1945, he studied at the Real Academia de Bellas Artes de San Fernando in Madrid until 1947, after which he studied briefly in Paris.

== Career ==
Larkin returned to Dublin and set up a lithography company, but soon decided to sell it and devote himself to art. In 1953 he joined the Ballinasloe vocational educational committee as a teacher of art; in 1957 he moved to Mullingar, and in 1961, he moved to Dún Laoghaire Further Education Institute, where he established a one-year course for those looking to become teachers of art – the first one-year foundation course in an art school in Ireland. The Dún Laoghaire School of Art and Design later became a constituent school of the Dún Laoghaire Institute of Art, Design and Technology. In 1967, Larkin became professor of art at the teacher training college in Blackrock, a position he held until his retirement in 1983.

In 1969 Larkin became a member of the Department of Education's advisory council, set up "to restructure the National College of Art after it had been removed from direct government control following the student sit-in which had lasted for six weeks... of that year." In August 1969, he and several colleagues resigned due to a dispute with the minister for education Pádraig Faulkner. In 1978, he returned to the college and was appointed to the new board alongside John O'Meara, artist Muriel Brandt, and architect Patrick Shaffrey.

Larkin's 1981 book Art teaching and learning: A Seven-year Manual for the Primary/Elementary Teacher (described as an "enduring contribution to art education in Ireland") details Larkin's own philosophy. He believed that art should be a "multi-sensory experience" for children, which would improve their critical thinking and ultimately enhance their adult life.

As a venture and by his own choice, Larkin's creative work was rarely public or sold at auction. Many of his landscape paintings were inspired by the picturesque Atlantic region of Connemara in County Galway. Though figurative, his direct style became far more abstract after visiting the United States on a research trip in around 1970, at which point he was heavily influenced by abstract expressionism and the works of such artists as Arshile Gorky, Jackson Pollock, and Willem de Kooning. Larkin saw his own work as a "response to the constant flux of nature," attempting "to capture his experience of a place or scene and his emotional reaction to it."

Larkin exhibited at the Aisling Galleries, New York, Robinson Gallery, Dublin and exhibited about fifty works at the Royal Hibernian Academy in Dublin. His works include Wolfhound, Boats in the dock, Wicklow, Path Through the Moors, and Amagedon, which sold for $4,531 in 2006.

== Personal life ==
Larkin had two daughters and five sons. One son, Seán, has held senior posts at several Irish art institutions, including director of the Dún Laoghaire School of Art and Design.

== Death and burial ==
Diarmuid Larkin died on 25 June 1989 in Dún Laoghaire, Dublin. He was buried on 28 June in Shanganagh Cemetery.
