= Death and Nightingales (TV series) =

2018 television miniseries

- Title card
- Genre: Historical period drama
- Created by: Allan Cubitt
- Based on: Death and Nightingales by Eugene McCabe
- Written by: Allan Cubitt
- Directed by: Allan Cubitt
- Starring: Ann Skelly; Matthew Rhys; Jamie Dornan
- Composers: Gerry Diver; David Holmes
- Country of origin: United Kingdom
- Original language: English
- No. of series: 1
- No. of episodes: 3

Production
- Executive producers: James Mitchell; Tommy Bulfin
- Producer: Jonathan Cavendish
- Cinematography: Stephen Murphy
- Editor: Steve Singleton
- Camera setup: Multi-camera
- Running time: 58 minutes
- Production companies: Imaginarium Productions (The Imaginarium); Soho Moon; BBC Two Films

Original release
- Network: RTÉ One, BBC Two
- Release: 26 November – 12 December 2018

Death and Nightingales (also written Death & Nightingales) is a 2018 television historical drama miniseries, based on the 1992 novel of the same name by author Eugene McCabe. The series stars Ann Skelly, Jamie Dornan and Matthew Rhys. It started broadcast on RTÉ One in Republic of Ireland on 26 November 2018, and two days later in the UK on BBC Two.

== Cast ==
- Ann Skelly as Beth Winters, stepdaughter to Billy Winters
- Matthew Rhys as Billy Winters, Beth's stepfather and owner of Clonuala
- Jamie Dornan as Liam Ward
- Charlene McKenna as Mercy Boyle, a maid at Clonuala
- Seán McGinley as Jimmy Donnelly, the Roman Catholic Bishop of Clogher
- Martin McCann as Frank Blessing, a friend of Liam
- Michael Smiley as Dummy McGonnell, a mute
- Francis Magee as Mickey Dolphin, a farmhand at Clonuala
- Valene Kane as Catherine Winters, Beth's mother

== Production ==
Jamie Dornan and writer Allan Cubitt had previously collaborated on The Fall. The show was filmed in County Fermanagh and at Springhill House, near Moneymore in County Londonderry in Northern Ireland Cubbit revealed that the series was a "Brexit warning", saying "we can't afford to go back" to how things were before the Northern Irish peace process.

== Episodes ==
No.	Title	Directed by	Written by	Original release date	U.K. viewers (millions)
1	"Episode 1"	Allan Cubitt	Allan Cubitt	28 November 2018	2.73
2	"Episode 2"	Allan Cubitt	Allan Cubitt	5 December 2018	1.90
3	"Episode 3"	Allan Cubitt	Allan Cubitt	12 December 2018	N/A

== Release ==
Red Arrow Studios distributed the series, and the first episode premiered on BBC Two on 28 November 2018. In the United States, the series began airing on Starz on 16 May 2021.

== Critical reception ==
The series was met with indifferent reviews from critics. On the review aggregation website Rotten Tomatoes, the series holds a 60% approval rating with an average rating of 6.0 out of 10 based on 15 reviews. Gerard O'Donovan of The Daily Telegraph gave the show four stars out of five, calling it "the rarest of dramatic gems - one that pushes and challenges understanding - and it's impossible not to be drawn in." The Times' Carol Midgley was slightly more critical, deeming it "a heavy drama with lean dialogue and precious little mirth, but I'm being seduced." Ed Cumming, writing for The Independent, gave the show three stars out of five, saying "The desired tone, I think, is a kind of Ulster version of Deadwood, a creation parable for the problems of the 20th century, but there is a fine line between powerful and self-parodic."
