= Helen O'Toole =

American painter and educator

- Born: 1963 (age 62–63); County Mayo, Ireland
- Education: School of the Art Institute of Chicago, National College of Art and Design
- Known for: Painting, drawing, education
- Style: Abstract
- Awards: Guggenheim Fellowship, Pollock-Krasner Foundation Award
- Website: Helen O'Toole

Helen O'Toole (born 1963) is an Irish-born painter based in the United States, who is known for abstract paintings suggestive of landscape. She has exhibited throughout Ireland and the United States, in Singapore, and at venues including the San Francisco Museum of Modern Art, Portland Art Museum, Chicago Cultural Center, Tacoma Art Museum, and Institute of Contemporary Arts Singapore. Her work has been featured in the journals Artforum, Arts Magazine, New Art Examiner, and Zyzzyva, as well as the Chicago Tribune, The Irish Times, Seattle Post-Intelligencer, and National Public Radio. Art writers frequently discuss the interplay in her work between abstraction, the evocation of otherworldly light, land and space, and a commitment to investigating meaning through a painting process akin to the processes of cultivation and excavation. Artforum critic James Yood wrote, "echoing the often inchoate quality of nature, her paint surges toward mystery and hints at a kind of chiaroscuro of the spirit"; curator Bonnie Laing-Malcomson suggests her "richly colored monumental paintings evoke the moody landscape of her rural Irish homeland, summoning the force of J. M. W. Turner and Mark Rothko." She has been recognized with a Guggenheim Fellowship in Fine Arts, a Contemporary Northwest Art Award (both 2016), and a Pollock-Krasner Foundation Award (2013), among other awards. O'Toole lives in Seattle, Washington and is Professor of Art and Chair of the Painting and Drawing Program at the University of Washington.

Helen O'Toole, Mary Larkin's Bottom, oil on canvas (diptych), 100" x 156", 2013. Portland Art Museum Collection.

== Life and career ==
O'Toole was born in County Mayo in the rural west of Ireland in 1963. She attended the Institute of Technology, Sligo and the National College of Art and Design, Dublin (BA, Painting and Drawing, 1986), where her early painting was influenced by European modernists such as Alberto Burri, Asger Jorn, and Antoni Tàpies. In 1987, she moved to the United States to pursue graduate studies at the School of the Art Institute of Chicago (MFA, Painting, 1989); that same year she received a scholarship to the Skowhegan School of Painting and Sculpture. In 1990, she was featured in "The Chicago Show" sponsored by the Art Institute of Chicago and the Museum of Contemporary Art Chicago, and began showing widely in universities and museums, and at Sazama Gallery in Chicago, which held her first solo show in 1991. In subsequent years, she has had solo exhibitions at the Chicago Cultural Center (1994), the Sligo Art Gallery (1999), Linenhall Arts Centre (2007) and Hamilton Gallery (2014) in Ireland, and Linda Hodges Gallery (Seattle, 2000–2013), among others. Her work has also been featured at the SFMOMA Gallery, Portland Art Museum, and Fine Arts Work Center.

O'Toole began her teaching career at La Salle College of the Arts in Singapore in 1993, where she was a lecturer until 1995; her uncle, Brother Joseph McNally, an educator and sculptor, founded the college in 1984. She returned to the United States, living in New York for a year while renting a studio in Brooklyn, before she accepted an appointment as Assistant Professor at the University of Washington (UW) in Seattle in 1996. In 2002, O'Toole gave birth to a daughter, Lydia, and accepted an Associate Professor position at UW; she was appointed Professor and Chair of the Painting and Drawing Program in 2014. She has also taught at the university's Studio Art Program in Rome in 1999 and 2004.

Helen O'Toole, Pagan Pilgrimage, oil on canvas, 98" x 82", 1992.

== Work ==
Critical considerations of O'Toole's work have often focused on her longstanding engagement with place and landscape through abstraction. Early reviews describe her "nature-derived abstraction" as displaying an Abstract-Expressionist "sense of natural flux"; writers two and three decades later discuss her work as existing on the cusp between abstract and figurative and being rooted in observable facts that are "summoned only to dissolve." Critics compare her painting to art spanning almost two centuries, suggesting qualities of both historical consciousness and contemporaneity; representative works such as Mary Larkin's Bottom (2013), for example, are often compared to those of early 19th-century painter J. M. W. Turner—known for his luminous, atmospheric and turbulent landscapes that border on abstraction—and those of 20th-century abstract artist Mark Rothko, known for monumental, contemplative color field paintings. Writers also liken her work to the subjective, late landscapes of Caspar David Friedrich, the "dim complexity" of Albert Pinkham Ryder's seascapes, and the "pensive and brooding" landscapes of fellow West-Irish artist Jack Butler Yeats.

Despite the abstract nature of O'Toole's work—and her early attempts to dispel associations with landscape, in part, by working vertically—writers (in Ireland and elsewhere) have consistently described her work as "distilling the essence" of the experiences, history, and terrain of her native region. Salli McQuaid characterized her work as moody and intense with an "undercurrent of dark passion and superstition" common to Irish culture; Bonnie Laing-Malcomson writes that O'Toole "channels the deep-seated pain and misery of the past […] into such beauty that it elicits a sense of redemption." Author Colin Teevan suggests that she invokes, by suggestion and technique, the rich textures and starkly contrasting colors of a "barren, craggy land, battered by wind and rain and overshadowed by an everchanging sky."

Helen O'Toole, Mustard Field, oil on canvas, 79" x 60", 2000.

Critics note, however, that O'Toole realizes those qualities less by an engagement with observed reality or specific narrative than through the potentialities of paint, worked in a manner that Chicago Tribune reviewer Alan Artner identified as a "kind of spiritual quest" similar to that of early abstract modernists. Others have described her process as a never-resolved battle or, in Arts Magazine critic Kathryn Hixson's words, an attempt at "approaching the sublime—another world—through personal struggle with materials capable of, but resisting, being controlled." In early works, such as Pungence (1991) and Pagan Pilgrimage (1992), O'Toole created atmospheric expanses and pictorial incident through washes, drips, spills, gesture and texture. Some early reviewers suggested the level of painterly incident could have been pared down; others, such as James Yood, affirmed what he termed the "seething ebb and flow of the forces of color" and precarious, "nervous balance of pictorial forces." In the late 1990s, O'Toole turned to a more deliberative process of working wet-on-wet layers of paint that she scraped and scumbled (e.g., Mustard Field, 2000)—often over several years—in a manner sometimes compared to the measured work of farming. O'Toole herself has said, "The paintings are built slowly, made in layers, with a similar measure to working the soil, revealing the strata of the bog, negotiating clumsy, crusty limestone fields at a deliberate pace."

O'Toole's handling of light, color and paint achieves what critics often call an "elliptical" quality in her work, a ruminative cycle that viewers are drawn into, moving from hazy, shifting layers, minimal forms and murky, muted passages of color to painterly surface texture to the compositions as a whole, and back. Combined with the enveloping, monumental scale of much of the work, the spatial ambiguity of paintings such as Mary Larkin's Bottom (2013), To Remember (2015), or Gan Ainm (2016–8) enables viewers to enter into what some have called a "meteorological-psychological space" in which they may perceive encoded emotions, implied metaphors and layered allusions to place, history and legend.

In addition to her paintings, O'Toole has worked on small-scale, mixed media (including oil and watercolor) works on paper in her career. This work was exhibited on its own in a 2007 Linenhall Arts Centre solo show titled "Beag" ("Small") featuring 32 works on paper of six to fourteen inches. O'Toole has said that these small-scale works (for example, Cross, 2001 or St. Patrick's Well I, 2007) enabled her to explore scale, space and the geometry of the rectangle with regard to color, light and form in a different way. Since 2013, O'Toole has focused on a series of epic-scaled paintings that probe the socio-mythical expressions of her ancestors and the ways in which they were molded by the land; the series includes works such as To Remember and Going (both 2015), and the larger paintings Everywhere (2013, 100" x 156") and The Lay of the Land (2016–8, 88" x 192").

== Awards and recognition ==
O'Toole has been recognized with fellowships from the Guggenheim Foundation (Fine Arts, 2016), Pollock-Krasner Foundation (2013) and Skowhegan School of Painting and Sculpture (1989); a Contemporary Northwest Art Award (one of eight given by the Portland Art Museum, 2016); and Jack and Grace Pruzan Endowed Faculty Fellowships (2009-2012, 2013- 2015) and Milliman Endowment Fund awards (2007–13) from the University of Washington, among others. She has also received artist residencies from the Fine Arts Work Center in Provincetown (1991), the Bemis Center for Contemporary Arts in Omaha, and the Tyrone Guthrie Centre Residency Programme in Annaghmakerrig, Ireland (both 1992). Her work has been acquired by many private collections, as well as those of the Portland Art Museum, the National College of Art and Design, Dublin and the Institute of Technology, Sligo.
