= Seán Larkin =

Irish artist, curator, and educationist (born 1949)

- Born: 1949 (age 76–77); Dublin, Ireland
- Education: National College of Art and Design
- Occupations: Art curator; professor of art and design; painter; chorist
- Years active: 1978–present
- Father: Diarmuid Larkin

Seán Larkin (born 1949) is an Irish art curator and art educationist. Having held senior posts at several Irish art institutions, including director of the Dún Laoghaire School of Art and Design, Larkin has worked extensively in Sligo and his native Dublin.

== Early life and education ==
Seán Larkin was born in 1949 in Dublin. He is the son of Anne Larkin (née O'Neill) and Diarmuid Larkin, an Irish artist and art educationist in whose footsteps Seán followed. He was educated at the National College of Art and Design in Dublin, where he graduated in 1973.

== Career ==
Larkin begin his career at a senior management level in 1978. He represented the Institutes of technology in the Republic of Ireland as Chair of the Working Group on Practice-based Research in the Arts (an advisory group established by the Higher Education and Training Awards Council (HETAC) and the Irish Universities Quality Board). Also for the HETAC, he was an external examiner and assessor in Fine Art on a variety of assessment and programme validation panels.

From 1998 to 2004, Larkin was head of the Department of Art and Design at the Dún Laoghaire Institute of Art, Design and Technology (IADT), where he explored abstract expressionism. Previous to this post, he was head of the Department of Humanities at the Atlantic Technological University Sligo. At the same time, he was the HETAC nominee on the Council for Curriculum and Assessment, and worked with public and private collections, including the Arts Council Collection, Ireland.

Larkin was head of the School of Creative Arts at the IADT from 2005 to 2012. He joined The Model, Sligo in 2016, later describing his time there "as a catalyst for continuing creative inquiry, creative practice and related research loosely based on cultural signposts." He has also held exhibitions for the Hamilton Gallery in Sligo.

Larkin is currently chairman of the Sligo International Choral Festival. He joined the board in 2012 and "moved quickly through the ranks." For World Homeless Day 2016, Larkin invited the High Hopes Choir, Ireland's first homeless choir, to join the festival in Sligo.

In 2020, Larkin selected the work for Water, an online exhibition with ArtNetdlr, The Dun Laoghaire - Rathdown Artist Network.
