= John O'Meara =

John O'Meara may refer to:

- John Corbett O'Meara (born 1933), United States federal judge
- John O'Meara (politician) (1856–1904), Liberal Party Member of Parliament in New Zealand
- John J. O'Meara (1915–2003), Irish classical scholar and historian of ancient and medieval philosophy
- Johnny O'Meara (1929–2011), Irish rugby union player
