= Further Beyond =

- Promotional Poster
- Directed by: Joe Lawlor; Christine Molloy
- Produced by: Joe Lawlor; Christine Molloy
- Starring: Jose Miguel Jimenez; Denise Gough; Alan Howley; Aidan Gillen
- Music by: Stephen McKeon
- Release date: February 19, 2016 (Dublin International Film Festival)
- Running time: 89 minutes
- Country: Ireland
- Language: English

Further Beyond is a 2016 Irish film by Desperate Optimists (Christine Molloy and Joe Lawlor) that has been described as "part essay, documentary and quirky drama" and a 'masterpiece of intricate if indirect construction.'

The film is very loosely based on the story of Ambrosio O'Higgins, an Irish-Spanish colonial administrator who served the Spanish Empire as captain general of Chile from 1788 to 1796 and as viceroy of Peru from 1796 to 1801. However, as David Jenkins notes in Little White Lies, it is a "movie biopic that’s been carefully pulled inside-out, interested in posing questions about the ethics of representation and what it means to deliver personal history as objective fact".

Further Beyond was made under the Arts Council Ireland Reel Art scheme.

== Cast ==
- Jose Miguel Jimenez as Ambrosio O'Higgins
- Denise Gough as Voice Over 1
- Alan Howley as Voice Over 2
- Aidan Gillen as Ambrosio O'Higgins

== Reception ==
Further Beyond was very well received critically with Mark Kermode describing it as "groundbreaking" and "playful". Leslie Filperin gave it a five star review in the Guardian and called it "essential viewing".

== Release ==
Further Beyond had its world premiere at the Dublin International Film Festival on 19 February 2016, and its international premiere in competition at FID Marseille in 2016, followed by its UK premiere at the London Film Festival in 2016. The film then went on to screen on MUBI and in selected UK and Irish cinemas.
