= National Film School =

National Film School may refer to:

- Centro Sperimentale di Cinematografia, Italy, also referred to as Scuola Nazionale di Cinema, or National Film School
- Leon Schiller National Film School, known as Łódź Film School, Poland
- National Film and Television School in Beaconsfield, England
- National Film School of Denmark
- National Film School of Ireland, within Dún Laoghaire Institute of Art, Design and Technology (IADT)

== See also ==
- Australian Film, Television and Radio School
