= Hamilton Gallery =

Hamilton Gallery may refer to:

- Hamilton Gallery (Sligo), in Ireland
- Hamilton Gallery (Victoria), in Hamilton, Victoria, Australia
