= Cathy Carman =

Irish sculptor and artist (born 1952)

- Born: Catherine Byrne; 1952 (age 73–74); Portlaoise, County Laois, Ireland
- Occupation: Sculptor
- Spouse: Michael Harding (m. 1993)
- Children: 2

Catherine Carman (born 1952) is an Irish sculptor, noted for large figurative works, often based on the human figure, in multiple materials. She is also a painter, and latterly additionally works with "found objects", digital imaging and sound. She is a member of Aosdána, Ireland's national academy of artists, and examples of her works are held in multiple major collections.

== Early life and education ==
Catherine Byrne was born in Portlaoise, County Laois, in 1952, and grew up on Dublin Road there. Her parents ran a shop. She attended secondary school at Presentation Convent, Portlaoise and took art classes at a local VEC school. She won a substantial prize in a Clarks shoe design prize competition which enabled her to pursue third level studies at the National College of Art and Design in Dublin. She later studied at Dun Laoghaire School of Art and the Chiswick Art School in London.

== Artistic career ==
Carman has worked as a sculptor since college, and is best known for her large figurative works, most often in wood, stone or metal, and ceramics. She has stated that the human figure is central to her work, and her style has been described as expressionistic.

In her twenties, she primarily worked from a studio in Dublin's Henrietta Street, and from 1984 she was a founding member of what became Temple Bar Studios, before moving to a site overlooking Lough Allen with her second husband.

Carman has participated in many group exhibitions, as well as presenting solo shows, in both Ireland and abroad, including:

- 1984, Dublin: Project Arts Centre (solo)
- 1987, Dublin: Grafton Gallery (solo)
- 1987: Portlaoise: County Hall (solo)
- 1989, Glasgow: Barbizon Gallery
- 1990, Dublin: Project Arts Centre
- 1991, County Galway: Clifden Arts Festival
- 1999, Dublin: Temple Bar Galleries & Studio
- 2008, Tulsk, County Roscommon: Cruachan Aí Centre (The Nine Icons of Oweynagat, solo)
- 2011, Greenacres, Wexford: Wexford Opera Festival Art Exhibition (group)
- 2016, Castlebar, County Mayo: Linenhall Arts Centre (Diary, solo)
- 2019, Sligo: The Hamilton Gallery (Trans-formation, solo)
- 2023, Sligo: The Hamilton Gallery (Rapture, solo)
- 2025, Westport: Custom House Studios and Gallery (After The Storm, solo)

-

== Holdings and recognition ==
Works by Carman are held in many collections, including those of Ireland's Arts Council and National Self-Portrait Collection, major Irish financial institutions, Dublin, Laois and Sligo local authorities, the Tyrone Guthrie Centre, and the European Parliament.

Carman sculptures can also be seen at a number of public locations, including at schools in Dublin and Laois, the Blasket Islands visitor centre, Parnell Street in Dublin and Tullamore Garda station.

She received major awards from the Arts Council in 1986, 1987 and 1989. In 1992, she won the annual commission to produce seven sculptures as prizes for the Aer Rianta annual Business to Arts awards.

Carman is a member of Aosdana, Ireland's selective artists' academy, and as of 2023, of that body's co-ordinating committee, the Toscaireacht.

== Personal life ==
Carman has a son, sculptor Simon Carman, from her first marriage. She met writer and priest Michael Harding at the Tyrone Guthrie Centre artists' retreat in 1984, and after a year of so they established a steady relationship, and Harding has noted that Carman introduced him to the Dublin arts world. Though Harding was never formally laicised, they married in 1993 and moved to a holding in County Leitrim, by Lough Allen near the County Roscommon border. Carman and Harding have one daughter.
