= Pilgrimage (2017 film) =

2017 film by Brendan Muldowney

- Theatrical release poster
- Directed by: Brendan Muldowney
- Screenplay by: Jamie Hannigan
- Produced by: Connor Barry
- Starring: Tom Holland; Richard Armitage; Jon Bernthal
- Cinematography: Tom Comerford
- Edited by: Mairead McIvor
- Music by: Stephen McKeon
- Production companies: Savage Productions; Screen Ireland
- Distributed by: RLJE Films
- Release dates: April 23, 2017 (Tribeca Film Festival); June 24, 2017 (Edinburgh International Film Festival); July 13, 2017 (Galway Film Fleadh)
- Running time: 96 minutes
- Country: Ireland
- Languages: English; French; Latin; Irish
- Budget: €4.7 million
- Box office: $23,689

Pilgrimage is a 2017 Irish medieval film directed by Brendan Muldowney, and starring Tom Holland, Richard Armitage and Jon Bernthal. It premiered at the Tribeca Film Festival in April 2017.

== Plot ==
In AD 55 Cappadocia, Saint Matthias is stoned to death. Before the final stone is thrown, lightning begins to crackle overhead.

In 1209 Medieval Ireland, French Cistercian monk Frère Geraldus arrives at a remote monastery with a charter from Pope Innocent III, commanding the monks to undertake a pilgrimage to transport their holiest relic to Rome, in the hope that it will aid in the upcoming Fifth Crusade. A handful of monks set out, including multilingual Brother Ciarán and novice Brother Diarmuid, accompanied by a mute labourer. As the group is caught in a rainstorm, the golden reliquary is struck by lightning but shows no damage, further reinforcing the notion of its mystical power.

A caravan of armed men, led by Raymond de Merville, escorts the monks toward the boat awaiting them in Waterford. Raymond, speaking French, tells the mute labourer that some of his men recognise him as perhaps a former crusader. Only Brother Ciarán speaks French, and the mute does not react to Raymond's words, leaving it in question whether he understands French.

En route, the caravan finds that a necessary bridge has been burned and its guards slaughtered. Raymond takes most of the soldiers with him to give chase, leaving the monks with a token guard.

The monks continue, but are quickly ambushed by a group of Gaelic warriors, who slaughter the soldiers and several monks. The Mute dives to protect young Diarmuid, but is stunned by a rock from a sling. As the Gaels make off with the cart bearing the reliquary, the Mute regains consciousness as a chime sounds and kills several of the Gaels, including their chieftain; the rest scatter in fear. The two surviving monks, Diarmuid and the timid Cathal, are astonished until Geraldus claims the Mute's fierce actions as holy wrath on the Gaels for desecrating the reliquary and the chime is proof of this miracle. They follow after the stolen relic.

As the Mute and Diarmuid prepare to sneak into the camp, Raymond and his lieutenants appear. They are there for the relic, as they hired the Gaels to murder the pilgrims so that King John of England could claim the relic instead of the Pope. During their discussion Diarmuid sneaks to Ciarán's side and attempts to cut his bonds. Ciarán, who was driving the cart, tells Diarmuid that he threw the relic from the cart and that Diarmuid must find the relic and leave him to his fate. The Mute keeps Diarmuid from running back to try to save Ciarán as Raymond tortures him.

The chime is the bell of a river ferry. Brother Cathal barters for passage with pearls he recovered from when they fell loose of the reliquary. The boat takes them almost to the coast, but as the tide is out, the estuary is too shallow to pass. Behind them, Raymond and his men cross into a clearing on the shore. The ferrymen, realizing their own danger, throw their cargo out of the boat, and all push the boat through the shallows. Geraldus, speaking French, convinces the Mute to buy the pilgrims time to escape with a promise of absolution for the former Crusader. Diarmuid is distraught and tries to stop the Mute, but Geraldus holds him back as the boat begins to float.

On the boat, Cathal reveals that he was struck with the last arrow and slumps over. Geraldus tells Diarmuid that the holy relic will inspire a thousand men like the Mute to holy violence. In disgust, Diarmuid moves to throw the relic overboard. Geraldus struggles with him and goes overboard with the relic, sinking to the ocean floor.

The Mute, having killed Raymond, lies greviously injured on the shore with the remaining men standing over him. The surviving ferryman asks Diarmuid, "Where to now?", but the novice has no answer. As the camera fades away, light shines down on the boat.

== Cast ==
- Tom Holland as Brother Diarmuid
- Richard Armitage as Raymond de Merville
- Jon Bernthal as The Mute
- John Lynch as Brother Ciarán
- Stanley Weber as Frère Geraldus
- Eric Godon as Baron de Merville
- Hugh O'Conor as Brother Cathal
- Tristan McConnell as Dugald
- Eóin Geoghegan as Crobderg
- Rúaidhrí Conroy as Brother Rua

== Filming ==
Filming started in April 2015. Filming locations included the west coast of Ireland and Ardennes in Belgium.

== Reception ==
Katie Walsh of Los Angeles Times wrote, "For all its bloody and violent genre trappings, Pilgrimage [...] is a gorgeously shot film that carefully renders the details of this fascinating historical period."
