= Mister John =

- Promotional poster
- Directed by: Joe Lawlor; Christine Molloy
- Produced by: David Collins; Fran Borgia; Joe Lawlor
- Starring: Aidan Gillen; Zoe Tay; Michael Thomas; Claire Keelan
- Music by: Stephen McKeon
- Release date: 24 June 2013 (EIFF)
- Running time: 95 minutes
- Countries: Ireland; Singapore; UK
- Languages: English; Malay

Mister John is a 2013 drama film by Joe Lawlor and Christine Molloy (who are also known by the name of their creative partnership, Desperate Optimists). It was their second feature film following their debut Helen and stars Aidan Gillen, Zoe Tay, Michael Thomas, and Claire Keelan.

== Plot ==
Gerry Devine leaves London to deal with his deceased brother's business and family in Singapore. He becomes increasingly adrift in trying to cope with the loss of his brother and with his troubled marriage back home.

== Cast ==
- Aidan Gillen as Gerry Devine
- Zoe Tay as Kim Devine, John's widow
- Michael Thomas as Lester
- Claire Keelan as Kathleen Devine
- Vincent Tee as David Lim
- Michael Walsh, Andrew Bennett as John Devine, John Devine (Voice)
- Janice Koh as Lek
- Oon Shu An as Janjira
- Molly Rose Lawlor as Sarah Devine
- Ashleigh Judith White as Isadora Devine

== Release ==
Mister John premiered at the Edinburgh International Film Festival.

== Reception ==
Rotten Tomatoes, a review aggregator, reports that 85% of 13 surveyed critics gave the film a positive review; the average rating is 7.17/10. Tim Robey of The Daily Telegraph rated it 4/5 stars and described Gillen's acting as a "major, moving performance" that stops the film from becoming pretentious. Matt Micucci of Film Ireland compared it to Vertigo and called it "an incredibly brave and ambitious film for today's cinematic landscape". Guy Lodge of Variety described it as "a coolly composed, quietly impressive character study anchored by Aidan Gillen's tremendous performance". Stephen Dalton of The Hollywood Reporter wrote, "But despite some quality ingredients, Mister John never quite plumbs the hidden depths of poetic profundity it seems to promise."
