= One Last Deal (2026 film) =

Upcoming Irish film

- Theatrical release poster
- Directed by: Brendan Muldowney
- Screenplay by: Peter Howlett
- Produced by: Paul Kennedy; Richard Bolger; Patrick O’Neill
- Starring: Danny Dyer
- Production companies: Village Films; Hail Mary Pictures; Wildcard
- Distributed by: Wildcard Distribution (Ireland); Vertigo Releasing (British)
- Release dates: 28 February 2026 (DIFF); 13 March 2026 (British and Ireland)
- Running time: 89 minutes
- Countries: Ireland; British
- Language: English

One Last Deal is a 2026 drama film starring Danny Dyer as a football agent. It was released on 13 March 2026.

== Premise ==
Football agent Jimmy Banks tries to secure one last big payday for a superstar client.

== Cast ==
- Danny Dyer as Jimmy Banks

== Production ==
Brendan Muldowney is director of the film from an original script by Peter Howlett. The film is produced by Paul Kennedy for Village Films, Richard Bolger for Hail Mary Pictures, and Patrick O’Neill for Wildcard with support from Screen Ireland and Northern Ireland Screen.

The cast is led by Danny Dyer as football agent Jimmy Banks. Principal photography took place in the Republic of Ireland, with filming locations including Dublin and lasted for ten days. Post-production took place in Northern Ireland. First look images from filming were released to the media in February 2025.

== Release ==
The film had its world premiere at the 2026 Dublin International Film Festival on 28 February 2026. The film was released in cinemas in the UK and Ireland on 13 March.
