= Anima Vitae =

Animation studio based in Helsinki, Finland

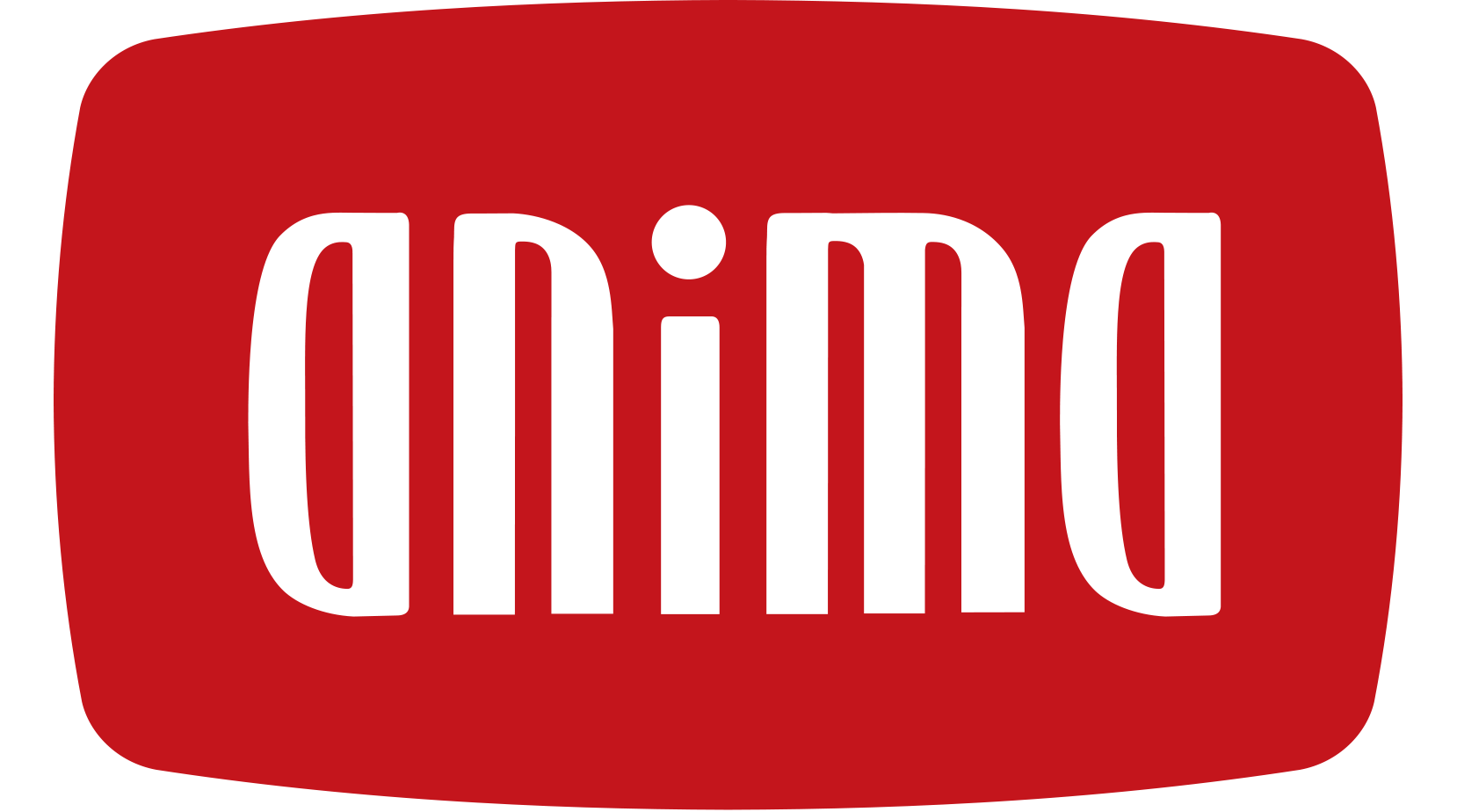
- Industry: Animation
- Genre: Computer Animation; Visual effects
- Founded: 12 May 2000
- Founders: Jani Kuronen: Olli Rajala; Antti Haikala; Simo Savolainen; Petteri Pasanen
- Headquarters: Finland
- Website: www.anima.fi

Anima Vitae is a Finnish animation studio based in Helsinki, Finland. Anima is known for CGI animation feature Niko and The Way to the Stars (also known as The Flight Before Christmas) (2008) which was sold to over 100 territories. The movie was also nominated for the Best Feature at the European Film Awards in 2009. Currently the sequel for Niko, "Niko2 – Little Brother, Big Trouble" (also known as Little Brother, Big Trouble: A Christmas Adventure), is traveling around the world. The film's producers Anima Vitae and Cinemaker were also nominated for Cartoon Movie's European Animation Producer of the Year in 2013. In 2013 Anima set up its second animation studio, AnimaPoint, to Kuala Lumpur, Malaysia in cooperation with a local partner, Creative Media Point.

== History ==
Anima is a privately owned animation studio founded in the year 2000 and located in Helsinki, Finland. With a sister company, Anima Point in Kuala Lumpur, Anima is a full service 3D animation production company. Anima's first real international hit, an award-winning 3D feature "Niko & The Way to the Stars" (2008) has been sold to over 100 countries. In year 2009 Anima was nominated for a Cartoon Movie Tributes as the best European animation producer, and European Film Academy slated Niko for the Best animation feature film of the year. Its sequel, Niko 2 – Little Brother, Big Trouble (also known as Little Brother, Big Trouble: A Christmas Adventure), premiered in 2012 and was nominated in four different categories for Finnish movie award, Jussi. Niko 2 was also a key element for Anima to get nominated for a Cartoon Movie Tributes 2013 as the best European animation producer. Anima has produced on a subcontractor basis seven TV-movies, 233 episodes of a weekly 15 min primetime political satire The Autocrats, 60 episodes of a local hit series Jefferson Anderson, around 300 high-end commercials and a large animation installation for Finnish Pavilion at Shanghai World Expo 2010. At the moment Anima Vitae is developing a feature animation film called Fleak. The Finnish Film Foundation supports the development of the film.

Currently Anima worked on Moominvalley (TV series).

== Filmography ==
=== Anima as a production company (selection) ===
- Niko and the Way to the Stars (2008) (U.S. title: The Flight Before Christmas)
- Niko 2 – Little Brother, Big Brother (2012) (U.S. title: Little Brother, Big Trouble: A Christmas Adventure)
- Apinatasavalta (2012)
- Dog'Y'Dog Christmas (2012)

=== Anima as a service studio (selection) ===
- The Autocrats (2001–2008)
- The Emperor's Secret (2006)
- Jefferson Anderson (2007–2012)
- Finnish Pavilion at Shanghai World Expo (2010)
- Magic Crystal (2011)
- Moominvalley (TV series) (2019–)

=== Films ===
- The Last Knit (2005)
