= Desperate Optimists =

Irish filmmaking and creative partnership

- Company type: Creative partnership
- Industry: Film production, theatre, visual arts
- Founded: 1992
- Founders: Christine Molloy; Joe Lawlor
- Products: Feature films, short films, theatre, interactive artworks

Desperate Optimists is the creative partnership of Christine Molloy and Joe Lawlor, which began in 1992. In an interview in 2008, Lawlor explained how they took inspiration from the title of Nicolas Mosley's book Hopeful Monsters.

The artistic work of Desperate Optimists has ranged from theatre productions, interactive artworks for the internet and video projects for galleries, to short films and feature films such as Helen and Mister John. There is often a strong community-centred aspect to their work. For example, their series of seven short films, Civic Life (2004–2008), was an attempt to capture different communities in different places in a simple long take for each film. Featuring sometimes hundreds of extras and complicated set-ups, all shot on 35mm, the production of each short film involved close collaboration with the communities in each area. Sight and Sound described this aspect of their filmmaking process as "communitarian" in the introduction to their interview by film critic and writer Sophie Mayer. The Independent Cinema Office organised a UK cinema tour of these films in 2016.

The short film Joy, from the Civic Life series, has been described as a prelude to the Desperate Optimists' first feature film, Helen.

Despite often working with non-professional actors, their most recent feature film, Rose Plays Julie, did feature a professional cast. It premiered at the London Film Festival in 2019, where critic Jonathan Romney reviewed it and described an "uncanny echo chamber quality" cultivated in their work, highlighting recurring themes of the uncanny, role-playing and the possibilities of other lives not lived.

He also described Civic Life as "a project pitched between visual art and cinema" highlighting the interdisciplinary nature of much of Desperate Optimists' work.

== Filmography (Features) ==
- The Future Tense (2022)
- Rose Plays Julie (2019)
- Further Beyond (2016)
- Mister John (2013)
- Helen (2008)

== Filmography (Shorts) ==
- Tiong Bahru (2010)
- Joy (2008)
- Daydream (2006)
- Leisure Centre (2005)
- Now we are grown up (2005)
- Town Hall (2005)
- Twilight (2005)
- Revolution (2004)
- Moore Street (2004)
- Who Killed Brown Owl (2004)

== Theatre ==
- Tom and Vera (2013)
- Urban Shots (1999)
- Playboy (1998)
- Stalking Realness (1997)
- Indulgence (1996)
- Dedicated (1995)
- Hope (1993)
- Anatomy of Two Exiles (1992)

== Online Artworks ==
- Catalogue (2003)
- London Framed (2002)
- map50 (2000)
- lostcause 1-10 (2000)
