= Rose Plays Julie =

- Promotional poster
- Directed by: Christine Molloy; Joe Lawlor
- Written by: Christine Molloy; Joe Lawlor
- Produced by: David Collins; Joe Lawlor
- Starring: Ann Skelly; Orla Brady; Aidan Gillen
- Music by: Stephen McKeon
- Release date: 3 October 2019 (London International Film Festival)
- Running time: 100 minutes
- Countries: Ireland; United Kingdom
- Language: English

Rose Plays Julie is a 2019 Irish drama film written and directed by Christine Molloy and Joe Lawlor, known collectively as Desperate Optimists.

== Plot ==
Rose is a veterinary student at university in Dublin. Adopted as a young child, Rose's adoptive mother has recently died and she has begun looking into who her biological parents are. She discovers her mother is an actress named Ellen who lives in London, and travels there to meet her. Rose calls Ellen on her mobile phone and reveals her birth name is Julie; Ellen realises who she is. She also follows Ellen to a film set and is noticed, but quickly walks off.

Finding that Ellen's house is for sale, Rose calls the estate agent posing as a potential buyer wanting to view the property. At the house, Ellen's teenage daughter Eva answers the door to Rose. Ellen recognises Rose during the viewing and takes her out into the woods to talk, a place she often goes to calm down. Ellen reveals to Rose that she was raped on a golf course, and that Rose (named Julie by her) was the result; she decided to give birth to her in order to focus on the positives of bringing a child into the world, but decided not to keep her. She tells Rose that her father is Peter Doyle, a celebrity archeologist.

Rose goes back to Dublin and attends the launch party for Peter's new book, but does not talk to him. She later volunteers on an archeological dig led by Peter, wearing a black wig over her red hair and pretending to be an actress named Julie researching for a role as an archeologist. Ellen comes to Dublin to work on a film and calls Rose, asking to meet with her; she later turns up at Rose's university flat. Rose tells her that she's seen Peter but not told him who she is. She admits that Peter living his life as if nothing happened angers her.

Peter gives Rose a copy of his book with his phone number written inside. Rose steals drugs used to put down sick animals from her university and fills a syringe with them, then goes to Peter's house while his family are out, intending to kill him. Peter is surprised by Rose's appearance, but lets her in. He quickly makes advances towards her, and when she tells him to stop he grabs her by the throat and pushes her up against a bookcase. She manages to get hold of a golfing award on the shelf and hits him over the head with it, then pulls the syringe from her jacket to find that it has broken; she shouts at Peter and reveals she is his daughter before fleeing, leaving him dazed and bloodied. When Peter's wife Teresa arrives home later he is forced to explain his head wound.

Rose goes to Ellen's hotel room and stays there while Ellen goes to her university flat to dispose of the veterinary drugs. Ellen finds Peter's book with his phone number in and calls him asking to meet at the golf course he raped her at; he agrees. Peter arrives before Ellen, who gets into his car to talk. She recounts the assault to him and then suddenly stabs him in the leg with the syringe; he at first attempts to stop her then accepts his fate and allows her to inject him with the drugs. He dies in the car within minutes. Ellen returns to her hotel room, waking a sleeping Rose, who tells her that she was dreaming about waiting by the sea for her.

== Cast ==
- Ann Skelly as Rose
- Orla Brady as Ellen
- Aidan Gillen as Peter
- Annabell Rickerby as Molly
- Catherine Walker as Teresa
- Joanne Crawford as Valerie
- Alan Howley as Dr. Langan
- Sadie Soverall as Eva

== Release ==
Rose Plays Julie premiered at the London Film Festival in 2019 and was released in UK cinemas by New Wave Films on 17 September 2021.

== Reception ==
Reception of Rose Plays Julie has been mainly very positive, with The Guardian listing it as one of the best films to see in the UK in Autumn 2021.

Film critic Sheila O'Malley has written of the "mythic" nature of the story and the "eerie" quality of Rose Plays Julie, something she describes as being not just a stylistic choice but also "an accurate depiction of the dissociative states of the three main characters, who move through their worlds like somnambulists". Jessica Kiang in Variety also highlighted the connections with myth alongside the contemporary relevance of the film, describing it as "a transgressive story [that] bides its time. It's a tale that feels ancient in structure, but terrifyingly modern in detail, mapping #MeToo-era revelations and a contemporary preoccupation with fractured identities onto a deceptively simple revenge plot that could have been plucked directly from a Greek drama, then plunged into liquid nitrogen to achieve its deep-freeze aesthetic." Critics such as Jonathan Romney have also highlighted parallels with Desperate Optimists' first film Helen, in that both feature young women who have been adopted, have a haunting "uncanny" quality and an interest in investigating the roles people play in life as well as films.

On Taste of Cinema, Justin Gunterman included Rose Plays Julie on his list of the 15 best films so far of 2021. He described it as "a triumph in every sense of the word. Considering the recent popularity of #MeToo inspired movies, this could have easily been a run-of-the-mill copycat. Instead, it's a hair-raising psychological thriller that refuses to sugar-coat its disturbing content."
