= Little Brother, Big Trouble: A Christmas Adventure =

2012 film

- Finnish theatrical release poster
- Finnish: Niko 2 – Lentäjäveljekset
- Directed by: Kari Juusonen; Jorgen Lerdam
- Written by: Marteinn Thorisson; Hannu Tuomainen
- Produced by: Hannu Tuomainen; Petteri Pasanen; Antti Haikala; Emely Christians; Moe Honan; Ralph Christians; Bernhard zu Castell
- Starring: Erik Carlson; Juhana Vaittinen; Mikko Kivinen; Vuokko Hovatta; Aarre Karen
- Edited by: Antti Haikala
- Music by: Stephen McKeon
- Production companies: Anima Vitae; Cinemaker; A. Film A/S; Ulysses; Magma Films
- Distributed by: Nordisk Film (Finland); Universum Film (Germany) (Note: Through Buena Vista International)
- Release dates: 12 October 2012; (Finland); 9 August 2013 (Japan)
- Running time: 79 minutes
- Countries: Finland; Denmark; Germany; Ireland; Estonia
- Languages: English; Finnish
- Budget: 7,316,273 €
- Box office: $23,785,681

Little Brother, Big Trouble: A Christmas Adventure (also known as Niko 2: Little Brother, Big Trouble, or simply Niko 2) is a 2012 animated comedy/adventure film. It was produced by Finnish studios Anima Vitae and Cinemaker OY, with co-producers Ulysses (Germany), A. Film (Denmark), and Tidal Films (Ireland). The animation was produced in Finland, Germany and Denmark, with post-production carried out in Ireland. It is the sequel to The Flight Before Christmas and was written by Hannu Tuomainen and Marteinn Thorisson, and directed by Kari Juusonen and Jørgen Lerdam. It was released in Finland on 12 October 2012. Anima Vitae and Cinemaker OY were nominated for Cartoon Movie Tributes 2013 in the category "European Producer of the Year". Like its predecessor, it is among the most expensive Finnish films ever produced.

The film was followed by a sequel, Niko: Beyond the Northern Lights, which was released in October 2024.

== Plot ==
The sequel takes places a couple of months after the events of the first film, and follows the story of Niko the reindeer. He must deal with his mother Oona getting remarried. He gains a stepbrother named Jonni, whom Niko hates at first, but when Jonni gets kidnapped by eagles, Niko flies off to rescue him.

During his journey, Niko is joined by an old, near-blind reindeer named Tobias, who is revealed to be the former leader of Santa Claus's reindeer, Santa's Flying Forces. Standing in Niko's way is White Wolf, Black Wolf's younger sister, who leads the eagles and wants revenge on Niko for her brother's defeat.

Niko and the rest of the team must come up with a plan to save Jonni, defeat White Wolf and return home. At the end of the film, Oona is revealed to have given birth to an unnamed fawn and introduces Niko and Jonni to their new half-sister.

== Cast ==
=== English version ===
- Matthew Boyle as Niko
- Darragh Kelly as Julius
- Ned Dennehy as Tobias
- Callum Maloney as Jonni
- Michael Sheehan as Lenni
- Niamh Shaw as White Wolf
- Susan Slott as Oona
- Aileen Mythen as Wilma
- Carly Baker as Saga
- Roger Gregg as Dasher
- Paul Tylak as Prancer

=== Finnish version ===
- Kari Hietalahti as Armas
- Juha Veijonen as Raavas
- Kari Ketonen as Spede
- Risto Kaskilahti as Uljas
- Erik Carlson as Niko
- Elina Knihtilä as Oana
- Mikko Kivinen as Julius
- Vuokko Hovatta as Wilma
- Aarre Karén as Topias
- Riku Nieminen as Lenni
- Juhana Vaittinen as Jonni
- Katariina Kaitue as White Wolf

== Release ==
Little Brother, Big Trouble: A Christmas Adventure was shown at the Hamburg Film Festival on 29 September 2012.

It was released in Finland on 12 October 2012. The film opened in 115 theatres and was seen by 150,889 viewers, grossing €1,384,148.

It was released in Japan on 9 August 2013, after being shown at the Kinder Film Festival.

It entered into limited European distribution in November and December 2013 in Germany, Denmark, Poland, France, Iceland, Netherlands, Russia, Belgium, Estonia, and in Asia in Korea, Israel in March of the same year.

The film was released in the fall of 2013 in Croatia, Serbia, Turkey, Portugal, Hungary, and Sweden.

In 2014, the film was released in Kuwait, China, Spain (limited), and Peru.

The film was released in the U.S. via Grindstone and Netflix in October 2013.

It moved to new territories in late October 2013.

=== Home media ===
Little Brother, Big Trouble was released in Finland on DVD and Blu-ray on 13 November 2013. It was released in the U.S. on October 29 the same year.

== Reception ==
Despite not having a rating as of yet in Rotten Tomatoes, Little Brother, Big Trouble: A Christmas Adventure has received generally mixed to positive reviews. The Internet Movie Database (IMDb) gave Little Brother, Big Trouble: A Christmas Adventure a 5.9 rating out of 10. Collectively, reviewers on Amazon.com have given the film a rating of 4 out of 5 stars. Reception for Niko 2 in Japan was quite strong and as a result it was awarded the Grand Prix of the best film in feature section in Tokyo Kinder Film Festival.

== Soundtrack ==
The film's original score was again composed by Stephen McKeon. The original score can be found for example in Spotify "Niko 2 – Little Brother, Big Trouble (Original Score)".

- "The Way to the Stars" - Sean Dexter
- "All About Us" - t.A.T.u

== Sequel ==
A sequel, Niko: Beyond the Northern Lights, was released on 11 October 2024 in Finland. In the film, Niko's biggest dream is to become a member of Santa's Flying Forces, but he gets challenged by the super talented reindeer girl Stella who shatters that dream, and Niko has to decide between trust and loyalty.

== See also ==
- List of Christmas films
- The Flight Before Christmas
