= The Flight Before Christmas (2008 film) =

2008 Finnish animated film

- Finnish theatrical release poster
- Finnish: Niko – lentäjän poika
- Directed by: Michael Hegner; Kari Juusonen
- Written by: Mark Hodkinson; Marteinn Thorisson; Hannu Tuomainen
- Produced by: Hannu Tuomainen; Petteri Pasanen
- Starring: Olli Jantunen; Hannu-Pekka Björkman; Vuokko Hovatta; Vesa Vierikko; Jussi Lampi; Risto Kaskilahti
- Edited by: Per Risager
- Music by: Stephen McKeon
- Production companies: Anima Vitae; Cinemaker Oy; A. Film A/S; Ulysses Filmproduktion; Magma Films
- Distributed by: Nordisk Film (Finland and Denmark); Universum Film (Germany) (Note: Through Buena Vista International); Magma Films (United Kingdom and Ireland)
- Release dates: 22 September 2008 (Rovaniemi); 10 October 2008 (Finland)
- Running time: 80 minutes 45 minutes (TV version)
- Countries: Finland; Denmark; Germany; Ireland
- Languages: English; Finnish
- Budget: €6,100,000
- Box office: $21,822,495

Niko & The Way to the Stars (Finnish: Niko – lentäjän poika, lit. 'Niko – A flyer's son') is a 2008 animated Christmas film directed by Michael Hegner and Kari Juusonen. It revolves around a young reindeer named Niko who must overcome his fear of flying by heading to Santa Claus' fell to save him and his fleet of flying reindeer from a pack of wolves. The film was a Finnish production with co-producers in Denmark, Germany and Ireland. It was produced by Anima Vitae, Cinemaker Oy, A. Film A/S, Ulysses Films, and Magma Films. The animation was produced in Finland, Germany and Denmark, with post-production carried out in Ireland. A 45-minute television edit in American English was produced in the United States for CBS under the title The Flight Before Christmas.

Two sequels, Little Brother, Big Trouble: A Christmas Adventure, and Niko: Beyond the Northern Lights, were released in 2012 and 2024 in Finland, respectively.

== Plot ==
Niko, a young reindeer, is told by Oona, his mother, that his father is one of the "Flying Forces", Santa's flying reindeer. For years, Niko has dreamed of joining his father in the Flying Forces, but he himself is unable to fly and has a fear of heights. While trying to fly with the encouragement of Julius, a flying squirrel, the other young reindeer teased Niko. To avoid further teasing, Niko and his friend Saga leave their protected valley so Niko can practice without any disruptions. They are soon spotted by wolves and flee back to the herd in panic, but wind up luring the wolf pack to the valley. As the herd flees, the herd's leader battles and defeats a wolf, but is wounded in the process. Later, Niko overhears others talking of how his actions have damaged the herd, and decides to leave the herd in an attempt to find his father and Santa's Fell.

When Niko is discovered missing, Julius chooses to look for Niko, since he can search without leaving a trail as fresh snow is falling. Once he finds him, Julius is unable to convince Niko to return to the herd, and reluctantly joins him in the search for Santa's secret location. Meanwhile, Essie, a lost pet Standard Poodle, stumbles upon the wolf pack and is about to be eaten. However, she accidentally gives the alpha leader of the pack, Black Wolf, the idea of killing Santa and his reindeer to take Santa's place to eat unsuspecting children. Essie is considered Black Wolf's good luck charm for this idea and is spared. She reluctantly joins the pack, and finds comfort in Specs, a timid wolf.

Niko and Julius discover Wilma, a white weasel, stuck in a small tree branch and rescue her. She reluctantly joins Niko and Julius, believing she is indebted to them. Julius and Niko later get separated in a sudden blizzard and Niko wakes up under a pile of snow, unnoticed by the nearby wolf pack. Niko overhears Black Wolf's plan, resolving to kill Santa as well and take his place so he could also eat children. When Niko is discovered as the snow falls off, he flees and finds Julius, but the two are cornered between rock cliffs. Wilma saves them by triggering an avalanche with her singing, then guides Niko and Julius to safety. She then continues to follow them, since she knows the way to Santa's home due to having previously worked there as a singer. Eventually, Niko tries to cross a dangerous river by flying with Wilma's help, but fails and falls once he looks down. Thinking they are dead, the wolves head for Santa's home. At the same time, Julius and Wilma save Niko from going over a high waterfall.

While waiting for Niko to recover, Julius recounts how his real family was taken by wolves, and says that he has viewed Niko like a son to him. Once they arrive at Santa's place, Niko is almost hit by the Flying Forces while standing on the runway. Niko tells them of Black Wolf's plan, but they doubt a wolf would discover Santa's secret valley. As they celebrate at their bar before heading out on Christmas Eve, Wilma sings them a song that asks them the identity of Niko's father. None of the reindeer respond, but they decide to do a "flying test" to see if Niko has the genetics to fly and thus prove if his claim is true. Upon realizing the potential danger of this, Julius yells at Niko while he is in midflight, and Niko falls but is saved by Dasher. As Niko leaves Santa's Fell, he gets into an argument with Julius for not wanting him to find his father before running off. Just then, the wolves find their way into the valley, and the scared reindeer lose their power of flight. Black Wolf chooses to pursue Niko and corners him up a tall tree.

Meanwhile, as the other reindeer are cornered on the runway by the other wolves, Julius convinces the reindeer that they can fly, allowing them to save Niko using the sleigh. Black Wolf latches onto the sleigh, but Julius dislodges the part he is holding on to and falls. In order to save Julius from falling as well, Niko jumps off the sleigh, only to realize that he can finally fly, and successfully saves Julius as Black Wolf falls to his seeming death. Niko, backed up by the Flying Forces, send the wolves fleeing when they realize Black Wolf's defeat. Prancer, congratulating Niko on his bravery, reveals that he is his father. Afterwards, Niko meets Santa, who invites him to join the Flying Forces, but after Julius leaves to update Niko's mother and the herd on his well-being, Niko chooses to stay with his mother and Julius, but intends to visit Prancer. Niko and Julius then take the herd to a new valley.

== Production ==
The animation took place in three countries; initial animation production and effects were produced in Finland, Germany and Denmark. Rendering and lighting took place in Finland, and much of the post-production was carried out in Ireland.

== Cast ==
=== English cast ===
- Andrew McMahon as Niko, a young reindeer who wishes to fly
- Morgan Jones as Julius, a flying squirrel
- Norm Macdonald as Julius (American dub)
- Alan Stanford as Black Wolf
- Susan Zelouf as Essie, a poodle
- Aileen Mythen as Wilma, a white weasel
- Emma Roberts as Wilma (American dub)
- Gavin Morgan as Smiley
- Carly Baker as Saga
- Paul Tylak as Prancer, one of Santa's flying forces and the father of Niko, and Specs
- Patrick Fitzsymons as Leader and Grandpa
- Morgan Jones, Paul Tylak, and Patrick Fitzsymons as Santa's Flying Forces
- Susan Slott as Oona, the mother of Niko

== Reception ==
Common Sense Media gave the film 3 out of 5 stars and stated that the wolves will scare younger kids in this holiday feature.

== Home media ==
The Flight Before Christmas was released on DVD and Blu-ray in most European territories, and was released as a direct-to-video film in North America on DVD on 25 October 2008.

== Soundtrack ==
The original score was composed by Stephen McKeon:

- "Happy Christmas!" – performed by Vuokko Hovatta
- "Flying Forces Rock" – written by Stephen McKeon
- "The Way to the Stars" – written by Stephen McKeon, performed by Sean Dexter

== Sequels ==
A sequel, Little Brother, Big Trouble: A Christmas Adventure, was released on 12 October 2012 in Finland. The sequel follows Niko, who deals with his mother remating and gaining a stepbrother named Jonni. When Jonni is kidnapped by eagles, Niko flies off to rescue him. He is joined by an old, near-blind reindeer named Tobias, the former leader of the Flying Forces. Also standing in Niko's way is White Wolf, Black Wolf's sister, who leads the eagles and wants revenge on Niko for her brother's death.

A second sequel, Niko: Beyond the Northern Lights, was released on 11 October 2024 in Finland. In the film, Niko's biggest dream is to become a member of Santa's Flying Forces, but he gets challenged by the super talented reindeer girl Stella who shatters that dream, and Niko has to decide between trust and loyalty.

== See also ==
- List of Christmas films
- Little Brother, Big Trouble: A Christmas Adventure
- The Magic Crystal
