= Death and Nightingales =

1992 novel by Eugene McCabe

- 1992 edition
- Author: Eugene McCabe
- Language: English
- Published: 1992
- Publisher: Vintage Books
- Publication place: Ireland
- Pages: 240
- ISBN: 074939868X

Death and Nightingales is a 1992 novel by Irish writer Eugene McCabe.

== Plot ==
1883, County Fermanagh, Ireland. On Beth Winters' twenty-fifth birthday, decades of pain and betrayal finally build to a devastating climax.

== Reception ==
Michael Ondaatje described Death and Nightingales as "a deeply moving, powerful, and unforgettable book." The Anglo-Celt called it a "modern classic."

== Adaptation ==
In 2018, a three-part television adaptation with the same name, starring Jamie Dornan, Matthew Rhys and Ann Skelly was broadcast. It was produced by Andy Serkis and Jonathan Cavendish's studio, The Imaginarium.
