= The Cellar (2022 film) =

2022 film by Brendan Muldowney

- Promotional poster
- Directed by: Brendan Muldowney
- Written by: Brendan Muldowney
- Produced by: Conor Barry; Richard Bolger
- Starring: Elisha Cuthbert; Eoin Macken; Dylan Fitzmaurice Brady
- Cinematography: Tom Comerford
- Edited by: Mairead McIvor
- Music by: Stephen McKeon
- Production company: RLJE Films
- Distributed by: Shudder
- Release date: April 15, 2022 (Shudder)
- Running time: 94 minutes
- Countries: Ireland; Belgium
- Language: English

The Cellar is a 2022 supernatural horror film written and directed by Brendan Muldowney and starring Elisha Cuthbert and Eoin Macken. It follows a family whose daughter disappears in the cellar of the large estate they have just moved into. The film was released via Shudder on 15 April 2022.

== Plot ==
Brian and Kiera Woods have moved into an old house with their teen daughter Ellie and their son Steven, an elementary student. The couple is called away to work, leaving Steven and Ellie to explore the house. They discover a secret room in the cellar containing strange formulas, symbols, and artwork painted or carved into the walls. They play a recording of a man reciting formulas and counting up slowly, which Ellie turns off so Steven can go to bed. Later that night the house's power shuts off. Ellie calls Kiera, who gives her instructions on how to find the breaker box, counting the number of steps to the cellar. When Ellie begins to act oddly, Kiera and Brian rush home to find Ellie missing. Searches are made, but ultimately the police believe that Ellie ran away as she had done so multiple times in the past and will return as she did previously.

Unsatisfied with their response, Kiera looks into the history of the secret room, the home, and one of its prior owners, John Fetherston, who went missing. During this she learns that the symbols spell out "Leviathan" and that the equation is a complicated representation of dimension(s). Strange, inexplicable phenomena occur around Kiera during all of this and at one point she is tricked into entering the cellar, where she is almost caught by an unseen, menacing presence. She is saved by Brian, who refuses to believe Kiera when she explains what happened to her. Growing increasingly more desperate, Kiera visits Fetherston's now elderly daughter Rose, who tells Kiera that her father allowed Leviathan contact with the human world in hopes of saving her brother Jack. However instead of a cure, the evil took over the entire house and is still very much active.

Kiera rushes home to discover that Brian has made discoveries of his own, namely that there are shapes and symbols over the doors that when combined with Leviathan means "Baphomet". While they are talking, Baphomet captures Steven. The couple find Steven in the secret room with a carving on his chest. Steven and Brian begin counting downwards; when they reach one, Baphomet appears and chases Kiera around the house and back to the cellar, which is now a long corridor with a door at the end. Kiera passes through the door to evade Baphomet. On the other side she sees many people counting upwards, one of whom is Ellie. Kiera manages to overcome Baphomet and reunite in the house with Brian and Steven, however when they try to leave the house they discover that they are still in the demon's dimension. The family then begins to count up, this time Kiera joining in.

== Cast ==
- Elisha Cuthbert as Keira Woods
- Eoin Macken as Brian Woods
- Dylan Fitzmaurice Brady as Steven Woods
- Abby Fitz as Ellie Woods
- Tara Lee as Erica
- Michael-David McKernan as Michael
- Andrew Bennett as Detective Brophy
- Aaron Monaghan as Dr. Fournet

== Production ==
An international co-production between Ireland and Belgium. The film was shot in November 2020 in Roscommon, Ireland.

== Release ==
The film premiered at South by Southwest in March 2022 before being released via Shudder on 15 April 2022.

== Reception ==
The Cellar currently holds a rating of 31% on Rotten Tomatoes, based on 62 reviews, with the critics consensus of "Although it doesn't tumble to The Cellar of the haunted house genre, this is a mostly musty exercise in second-rate supernatural horror."
