= Helen (2008 film) =

- Promotional Poster
- Directed by: Joe Lawlor; Christine Molloy
- Written by: Joe Lawlor; Christine Molloy
- Produced by: Joe Lawlor; Christine Molloy
- Starring: Annie Townsend; Sandie Malia; Danny Groenland
- Release dates: June 2008 (Edinburgh); 1 May 2009 (Ireland)
- Running time: 79 minutes
- Countries: Ireland; United Kingdom
- Language: English

Helen is a 2008 drama film by Desperate Optimists, (Joe Lawlor and Christine Molloy), and was the first feature film made through their production company Desperate Optimists Productions. It is often spoken of as an expansion or companion piece to their short film Joy.

== Plot ==
Helen stars Annie Townsend as a teenage girl who, when asked by the police to play the stand-in for a reconstruction, realizes it gives her a chance to confront her own troubled past.

== Cast ==
- Annie Townsend as Helen
- Dennis Jobling as Mr Thompson
- Sandie Malia as Mrs Thompson
- Danny Groenland as Danny

== Release ==
Helen played in over 50 film festivals and was distributed across the UK in 2009 by New Wave.

== Reception ==
Helen was acclaimed by critics such as Jonathan Romney in The Independent and Philip French in The Observer who wrote: 'With echoes of Antonioni and Bresson, the story of a young woman's disappearance is one of the most remarkable British debuts of recent years. Despite some misgivings on this first feature, Peter Bradshaw in The Guardian lauded the filmmakers as 'real talents with a distinctive, if evolving, film-making language of their own.'

Critic and writer Sophie Mayer highlighted a mythic quality to the film, something which has also been mentioned in relation to Desperate Optimist's more recent Rose Plays Julie. She writes: 'Given the film's title and protagonist, it seems unlikely that Desperate Optimists weren't thinking, at least a little, about the most famous Helen in history. Rather than the story of Troy, or the Helen who tempts Faust, they rediscover - in a thrilling comment on cinema's star system and the viewer's desire to both desire and believe - the eidolon, a woman always performing her fragmented self.'
