= Hamilton Gallery (Sligo) =

- Gailearaí Hamilton

- Location within Ireland
- Established: 2010
- Location: 4 Castle Street, Sligo, Ireland
- Coordinates: 54°16′14″N 8°28′23″W
- Type: art gallery
- Founder: Martina Hamilton
- Owner: Martina Hamilton
- Public transit access: Sligo; O'Connell Street bus stop (Sligo)
- Website: hamiltongallery.ie

The Hamilton Gallery is an art gallery in Sligo, Ireland. It hosts a continuous programme of solo and group exhibitions by contemporary visual artists.

== History ==
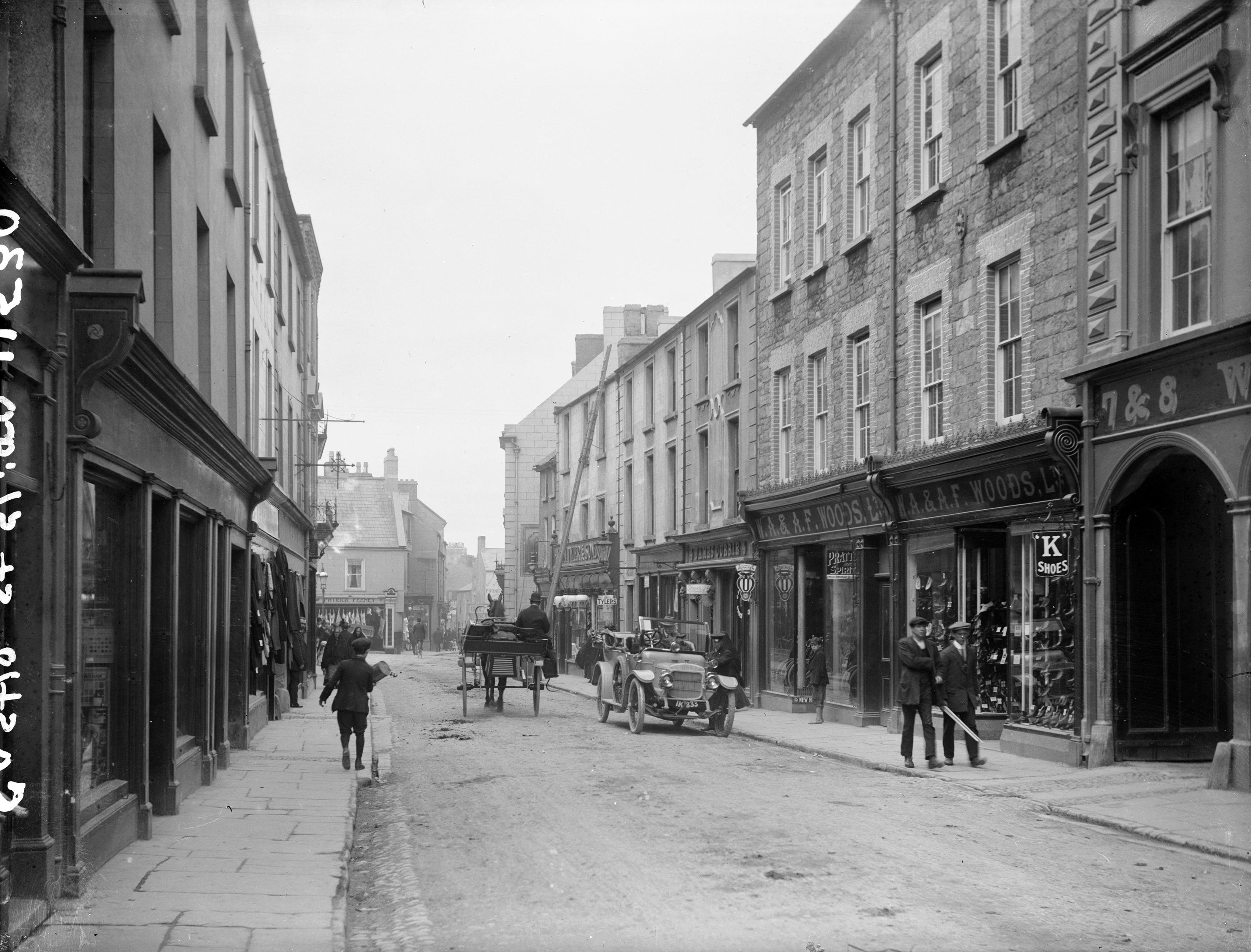
1910 photograph of Sligo; the building that currently houses the Hamilton Gallery is at centre, above the car.

The gallery was founded in 2010 by local artist Martina Hamilton, and is sited in a Victorian building on Castle Street.

In 2018, the Hamilton Gallery hosted responses to the W. B. Yeats poem "An Irish Airman Foresees His Death," to mark the centenary of the end of the First World War.

An exhibition of 2019–20 commememorated the life and work of Eva Gore-Booth. Another 2020 show responded to Bram Stoker, whose mother was from Sligo.

In 2022 it hosted a short film created for the St Brigid's Day global Irish festival of 2022, with a poem by Eiléan Ní Chuilleanáin.

Other local artists have also exhibited at the Hamilton, such as Seán Larkin, Cathy Carman, Helen O'Toole, Heidi Wickham, Naomi Draper and Mark Garry.
