= Savage (2009 Irish film) =

2009 Irish film

- Theatrical film poster
- Directed by: Brendan Muldowney
- Written by: Brendan Muldowney
- Produced by: Conor Barry
- Starring: Darren Healy; Nora-Jane Noone
- Cinematography: Tom Comerford
- Edited by: Mairead McIvor
- Music by: Stephen McKeon
- Production company: Savage Productions
- Distributed by: TLA Releasing
- Release dates: 10 July 2009 (Galway Film Fleadh); 17 September 2010 (Ireland)
- Running time: 88 minutes
- Country: Ireland
- Language: English

Savage is a 2009 Irish psychological thriller film directed by Brendan Muldowney, starring Darren Healy and Nora-Jane Noone.

== Cast ==
- Darren Healy as Paul Graynor
- Nora-Jane Noone as Michelle
- Gerry Shanahan as Josie Burns
- Brian Fortune as Homeless Man 2
- Jer O'Leary as Paul's Father
- Karl Shiels as Eddie
- Diarmuid Noyes as Attacker 2
- Bill Murphy as Self Defence Instructor
- Rachel Rath as Jenny
- Emmett J. Scanlan as Gym Changing Room Guy 1
- Eoin Macken as Gym Changing Room Guy 2
- Gerard Jordan as Bully
- Cathy Belton as Dr. Cusack

== Reception ==
Donald Clarke of The Irish Times called the film a "finely honed shocker enlivened by occasional moments of impressively black humour".

Gareth Jones of Dread Central gave the film a score of 4/5 and called it an "earnest, and devastating, study of the psychological effects of victimisation, brutalisation, intimidation, and sheer aggression turned inwards."

Paul Whitington of the Irish Independent rated the film 3 stars out of 5 and wrote that it "goes a long way on a very slim premise". Whitington praised the sound effects but criticised the "baroque conclusion that clumsily hammers home the film's message."
