= Ooops! Noah Is Gone... =

- Theatrical Release Poster
- Directed by: Toby Genkel
- Screenplay by: Mark Hodkinson; Richard Conroy; Toby Genkel; Marteinn Thorisson
- Produced by: Emely Christians; Moe Honan
- Starring: Callum Maloney; Ava Connolly; Dermot Magennis; Tara Flynn; Paul Tylak; Aileen Mythen; Alan Stanford; Patrick FitzSymones
- Edited by: Reza Memari
- Music by: Stephen McKeon
- Production companies: Ulysses Filmproduktion; Fabrique D'Images; Skyline Entertainment; Moetion Films; Studio Rakete; The Picture Factory; Grid Animation
- Distributed by: Wild Bunch (International); Entertainment One (Ireland and United Kingdom)
- Release dates: 26 February 2015 (Luxembourg City Film Festival); 1 May 2015 (Ireland); 17 July 2015 (United Kingdom); 30 July 2015 (Germany)
- Running time: 87 minutes
- Countries: Belgium; Germany; Ireland; Luxembourg
- Language: English
- Box office: CN¥10.8 million (China)

Ooops! Noah Is Gone... (also known as All Creatures Big and Small in the United States and Two by Two in the United Kingdom and Ireland) is a 2015 animated adventure film directed by Toby Genkel and co-directed by Sean McCormack based on an idea by Ralph Christians about what happened to the creatures that missed Noah's Ark.

A sequel, Ooops! 2: The Adventure Continues... (alternative title Two by Two: Overboard!), was released in Germany on September 22, 2020, in United Kingdom on October 23, 2020 and in Ireland on December 4, 2020.

== Plot ==
Dave is a Nestrian, a colorful aardvark-like animal whose only skills seems to be making comfortable nests and secreting a foul-smelling cloud of blue gas whenever they get emotional. Dave is constantly moving around searching for a place to stay, a real home, much to the despair of Finny, his son, who only wants to make friends. After hearing a rumor of a flood that is said to cover the whole world, Dave packs up again and takes Finny to the gathering of other animals where their only salvation awaits: an ark huge enough to fit in all the animals of the world. With their use of some creative thinking, some Nestrian craftsmanship, and the involuntary help of Hazel and her daughter Leah, who are black wolf-like animals called Grymps, they manage to sneak on the ark after all.

Just when the day seemed to have been saved, Dave and Hazel realize that Finny and Leah have disappeared. Their curiosity having gotten the better of them, they were on the scaffolding as the tidal wave hit the boat and it sailed away. Their parents panic as the ark sails away, leaving their children stranded on the last bit of land not yet engulfed by the water. Their desperate race against time begins. Leah, who is a born hunter is burdened with the clumsy and awkward Finny. Somehow, they manage to escape from the rising water, but the couple of flying foxes Griffins. Eventually two more animals were also rejected from the ark to their ranks, as they meet Obesey and his companion who is a squid-like parasite called Stayput. Finding his footing, surrounded by his new group of friends, Finny starts to emerge as the brave hero that he really is.

Meanwhile, their parents must get over their differences to work together, fight their way through gorilla guards and the egotistical Lion Captain to take control of the ark and save them. Having had many adventures, the "Fearless Four" manage to fight the continuing attacks of two Griffins who see Leah and Finny as their dinner. Eventually, the griffins and Obesey fall into the rising water along with Stayput. As the water reaches the top of the mountain where Leah and Finny are, the parents manage to take control of the ark and steer it to the mountaintop.

When the ark passes through a iceberg, it turns out to be hard to climb on. Finny first manages to climb on the ark, but he does not want to leave Leah behind and jumps back on the iceberg. Then Leah jumps on board of the ark and uses her sharp claws to hold on. Finny tries to get back on the ark too, but falls in the water, seemingly unconscious or dying. When Dave tries to save Finny from drowning in the water, the plot twist is revealed: Nestrians are actually aquatic animals, perfectly able to breathe and swim while submerged. This also explains why Dave was never feeling at home. Griffins later chase Finny, but Obesey who reveals to be a bowhead whale later appears and eats them, with Dave and Finny swimming alongside the ark, waving at Leah and Hazel. On the deck of the ark, the Lion Captain and his flamingo assistant discuss whether they should have told Dave and Finny in the beginning they belong in the sea.

In the credits, the Ark stops at the Mount Ararat and when all the animals leave the Ark, Dave and Finny discover Nestrians in the sea. It also includes Finny and Dave teaching Leah and Hazel how to swim, while the Griffins play a game of cards near a stack of fish inside Obesey's stomach.

== Broadcast ==
- Ooops! Noah Is Gone... aired on Channel 4, E4, Film4, 4seven, BBC One, BBC Two, BBC Three, CBBC, ITV1, ITV2, Channel 5, and 5STAR in the UK.

== Cast ==
- Callum Maloney as Finny
- Ava Connolly as Leah
- Dermot Magennis as Dave, Mr. Griffin and Prairie Dog
- Amy Grant (US), Tara Flynn (UK) as Hazel
- Paul Tylak as Obesey and Chimpanzee cabin service attendant
- Chris Evans as Stayput
- Aileen Mythen as Mrs. Griffin, Flamingo, Mrs. Gorilla and Margaret
- Martin Sheen (US), Alan Stanford (UK) as Leonard
- Patrick FitzSymones as Tanglefoot, Mr. Gorilla and Siberian tiger

== Reception ==
=== Box office ===
The film has grossed CN¥10.8 million at the Chinese box office.

=== Critical reception ===
While the film was acclaimed in Europe, its American dub was panned by that country's critics. The film has a 36% rating on Rotten Tomatoes with an average rating of 4.5/10, making the reception of the film on the website mixed-to-negative, but there is no critic consensus rating yet.
