= Eipic (TV series) =

Irish TV mini-series

- Publicity poster
- Genre: Teen drama comedy drama Musical comedy
- Written by: Mike O'Leary
- Directed by: Louise Ní Fhiannachta
- Starring: Fionn Foley; Cian Ó Baoill; Róisín Ní Chéileachair; Daire Ó Muirí; Fionnuala Gygax
- Country of origin: Republic of Ireland
- Original language: Irish
- No. of seasons: 1
- No. of episodes: 6

Production
- Producer: Paddy Hayes
- Cinematography: Colm Hogan
- Editor: Conall de Cléir
- Camera setup: Multiple-camera
- Running time: 31–33 minutes
- Production company: Magamedia

Original release
- Network: TG4
- Release: 4 February – 10 March 2016

Eipic (Irish: [ˈɛpʲɪc], "epic"), stylised as EIPIC, was an Irish teen drama miniseries which was broadcast on Irish-language station TG4 in 2016, coinciding with the centenary of the Easter Rising. It depicts five teenagers in contemporary Ireland who take over an abandoned post office and aim to start a "musical revolution." It was written by Mike O'Leary of Misfits, who wrote in English and then had his scripts translated into Irish.

== Production ==
Eipic received funding from TG4, the Broadcasting Authority of Ireland and the Section 481 tax scheme. The scenes in the village of Dobhar were filmed in Woodford, County Galway. Writer Mike O'Leary said that "The aim was to explore the idea of how teens today living in rural towns straddle two worlds [because of] the internet and social media […] On the one hand they’re stuck in the back of beyond, and on the other hand they’re plugged into this global network.”

== Plot ==
Five misfit teenagers living in a grim small Irish town ("Dobhar", from an Irish word meaning "gloomy") come together to rebel against the tedium of their lives.

== Reception ==
The Irish Times praised Eipic, Una Mullally saying that it "could be one of the best homemade dramas in recent times. […] It’s frenetic and funny, touching and blunt, equal parts Pure Mule, Skins and Glee. […] O’Leary’s writing is brilliantly boisterous, and aside from five excellent performances from the leads, the ancillary characters also shine […] The tone, pace, soundtrack […] and creative choices throughout bristle with an energy that’s been missing from a lot of Irish drama."

Eipic won the prize for Best TV Series at the Oireachtas na Gaeilge 2016 Media Awards. Róisín Ní Chéileachair was nominated for Best Actress for her role as Móna.

At the IFTA Gala Television Awards 2016, Eipic was nominated for Best Children's and Young People Programme; Best Director – Soap and Comedy (Louise Ní Fhiannachta); and Best Irish-Language Programme.
