= John J. O'Meara =

Irish philosopher

John J. O'Meara (18 February 1915 – 12 February 2003) was an Irish classical scholar, historian of ancient and medieval philosophy (in particular Augustine and Eriugena), educationalist and writer.

== Biography ==
John J. O'Meara was born in Eyrecourt (Co. Galway) to Mary Donelan and Patrick O'Meara on 18 February 1915, but lost his father when he was less than a year old. He had a younger brother, Patrick ('Paddy'). He was educated at Rockwell College and Garbally, Ballinasloe, becoming for a time a Jesuit scholastic. In his autobiographical book, The Singing Masters, O'Meara describes the hard times of his childhood, including the terror brought by the British Black and Tans, and by the subsequent Irish Civil War. He also describes his early experience of the beauty of nature, and of the difficult experience of following and at last ending his engagement as a Jesuit novice. A collection of short stories, Remembering Eyrecourt. Vignettes and Tales of earlier Days, Eyrecourt 2003, also describes the world of his childhood.

O'Meara took an M.A. degree in classics at University College Dublin in 1939 and was awarded a scholarship allowing him to complete a Doctorate in Philosophy at the University of Oxford (1942–45). The Singing Masters also describes war-time Oxford and the antiquated (and quaint) conditions in which he studied there. His thesis concerned Augustine's use of Porphyry and was later revised and published in Paris (1959). Returning to Dublin he was appointed Professor of Latin at University College Dublin in 1948, where he remained until his retirement in 1984. O'Meara held visiting appointments at the Princeton Institute of Advanced Study, Dumbarton Oaks (Harvard University) and Vassar College. In Ireland he played a major role in the effort to modernize education in the schools and universities, in particular the teaching of Latin and Irish, and the collaboration between University College Dublin and Trinity College Dublin. His ideas were ahead of their time in the conservative and Church-dominated atmosphere in Ireland.

O'Meara contributed to the founding of the Irish Association of Classical Teachers in 1959. In 1954 he published The Young Augustine (with many re-editions), an introduction to reading Augustine's Confessions which has kept its value. As well as being a leading internationally recognized scholar on Augustine, he did much to further the study of the early medieval Irish philosopher John Scotus Eriugena, founding the Society for the Promotion of Eriugenian Studies in 1970 which stimulated a spectacular development in the study of Eriugena. He published a monograph on the philosopher, Eriugena (1988), and when he died he was working on finishing a complete edition and English translation of Eriugena's masterpiece, the Periphyseon. O'Meara also published English translations of Latin texts important to Ireland, Giraldus Cambrensis' Topography of Ireland and The Voyage of Saint Brendan. O'Meara was president of the Alliance Française in Ireland and was awarded the Légion d'Honneur. He was a member of the Royal Irish Academy and of other international scholarly associations. In 1947 O'Meara married Odile de Barthes de Montfort, with whom he had three children and with whom he published a little book presenting new discoveries concerning Bernadette of Lourdes (Ordeal at Lourdes).

== Select bibliography ==
- A short biography and a bibliography of John O'Meara's publications in: From Augustine to Eriugena: Essays on Neoplatonism and Christianity in Honor of John O'Meara, ed. F. X. Martin and J. A. Richmond, Washington, D. C., 1991, pages ix-xx.
- The Topography of Ireland by Giraldus Cambrensis, Dundalk 1951 (also in Penguin Classics)
- The Young Augustine: the growth of St. Augustine's mind up to his conversion, London, 1954
- Reform in Education, Dublin 1958
- Porphyry's philosophy from Oracles in St. Augustine, Paris, 1959
- (with Odile de Montfort) Ordeal at Lourdes, Dublin 1959.
- Charter of Christendom:the Significance of St. Augustine's city of God, New York City, 1962
- The Voyage of Saint Brendan, Dublin 1976 (also Atlantic Highlands 1978).
- Eriugena Periphyseon (The Division of Nature), translated by I. P. Sheldon-Williams revised by J. O'Meara, Montréal and Washington, D. C. 1987.
- Eriugena, Oxford 1988.
- The Singing Masters, Dublin 1990.
- Studies in Augustine and Eriugena, edited by T. Halton, Washington, D. C., 1992.
- Understanding Augustine, Dublin 1997
