= Brendan Muldowney =

Irish film director, producer and screenwriter

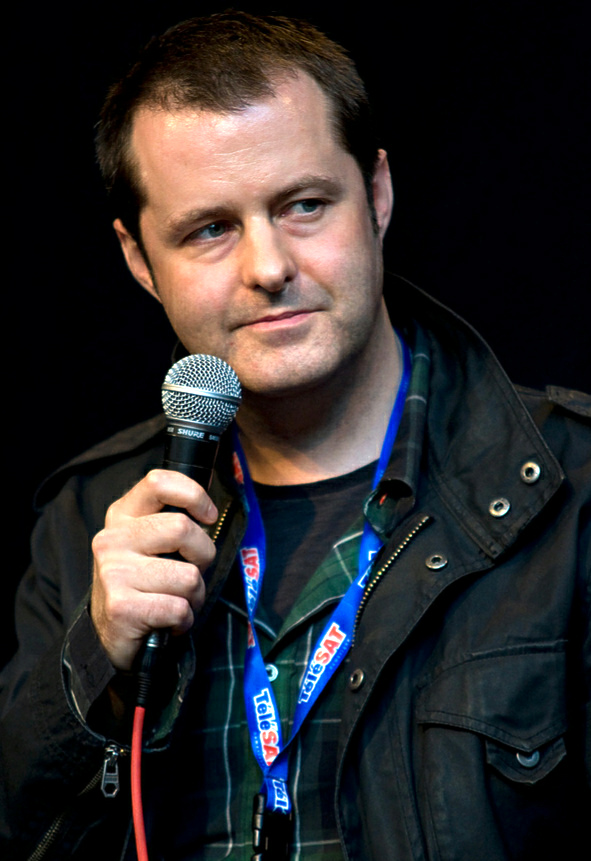
Brendan Muldowney

Brendan Muldowney is an Irish screenwriter and film director, and graduate of the National Film School of Ireland at the Dún Laoghaire Institute of Art, Design and Technology.

== Career ==
After graduating from the National Film School of Ireland, Muldowney wrote and directed 9 award-winning shorts. "Innocence" won the Tiernan McBride Award for Best Fiction Short at the Galway Film Fleadh in 2002 among many others, while "The Ten Steps" has won multiple awards including Best Short at the Sitges Film Festival and Kerry Film Festival.

His 2009 debut feature film Savage was nominated for 6 Irish Film and Television awards and he was nominated for the IFTA ‘Rising Star’ award. His second film, 2013's Love Eternal, has played at over 80 festivals worldwide and was winner of the ‘Dublin critics circle’ award for best Irish film at the 2014 Dublin Film Festival. His 2017 film Pilgrimage starring Tom Holland, Jon Bernthal and Richard Armitage, premiered at the Tribeca Film Festival and sold to multiple territories, including the United States and the United Kingdom.

He will direct the horror movie The Cellar, starring Elisha Cuthbert and Eoin Macken.

== Filmography ==
Short film

Year	Title	Director	Writer	Producer
1994	The Blind Lemmings Story	Yes	Yes	No
1999	The Message	Yes	No	No
2002	Innocence	Yes	Yes	Yes
2003	Church of Acceptance	Yes	Yes	No
2003	The Honourable Scaffolder	Yes	No	Yes
2004	Beauty Queen	Yes	Yes	No
2004	The Ten Steps	Yes	Yes	No
2006	Final Journey	Yes	Yes	No

Feature film

Year	Title	Director	Writer	Executive Producer
1998	Retribution in the Year 2050	Yes	Yes	No
2009	Savage	Yes	Yes	No
2013	Love Eternal	Yes	Yes	No
2017	Pilgrimage	Yes	No	No
2022	The Cellar	Yes	Yes	Yes
2025	Three Quick Breaths	Yes	No	No
