= Eugene McCabe =

Irish writer (1930–2020)

- Born: 7 July 1930; Glasgow, Scotland
- Died: 27 August 2020 (aged 90); Cavan, Ireland
- Resting place: Clones, Ireland
- Occupations: Novelist, playwright, short story writer, farmer
- Notable work: Death and Nightingales, Cancer trilogy (Cancer, Heritage, Siege) Tales from the Poorhouse, King Of The Castle
- Children: 4, including Ruth McCabe

Eugene McCabe (7 July 1930 – 27 August 2020) was a Scottish-born Irish novelist, short story writer, playwright, and television screenwriter. John Banville said McCabe was "in the first rank of contemporary Irish novelists'.

== Biography ==
Born to Irish emigrants in Glasgow, Scotland, he moved with his family to Ireland in the early 1940s. He lived on a farm near Lackey Bridge, just outside Clones in County Monaghan. He was educated at Castleknock College.

His play King of the Castle caused a minor scandal when first staged in 1964, and was protested by the League of Decency. McCabe wrote his award-winning trilogy of television plays, consisting of Cancer, Heritage and Siege, because he felt he had to make a statement about the Troubles. His 1992 novel Death and Nightingales was hailed by Irish writer Colm Tóibín as "one of the great Irish masterpieces of the century" and a "classic of our times" by Kirkus Reviews.

He defended fellow novelist Dermot Healy, who had been negatively reviewed by Eileen Battersby in The Irish Times in 2011, using the Joycean invective "shite and onions", provoking controversy in the Irish literary community.

Fintan O'Toole noted how living in Monaghan, just across the border from Fermanagh, informed McCabe's writing, and described him as "the great laureate of...indeterminacy, charting its inevitably tragic outcomes while holding somehow to the notion that it might someday become a blessing."

Eugene McCabe died on 27 August 2020, aged 90.

== List of works ==
Plays

- A Matter of Conscience (1962)
- King of the Castle (1964)
- Pull Down a Horseman (1966)
- Breakdown (1966)
- Swift (1969)
- Gale Day (1979)
- Victims (1981)

Television plays

- Cancer (1973)
- Heritage (1973)
- Siege (1973)
- Roma (1979)

Novel

- Death and Nightingales (1992)

Novella

- The love of sisters (2009)

Short story collections

- Victims: A Tale from Fermanagh (1976)
- Heritage and Other Stories (1978)
- Christ in the Fields, A Fermanagh Trilogy (1993)
- Tales from the Poor House (1999)
- Heaven Lies about Us (2005)

Children's books

- Cyril: The Quest of an Orphaned Squirrel (1987)
- Cyril's Woodland Quest (2001)

Non-fiction

- Shadows from the Pale: Portrait of an Irish Town (1996)
