= Linenhall Arts Centre =

Municipal building in Castlebar, County Mayo, Ireland

- Ionad Ealaíon Halla an Línéadaigh
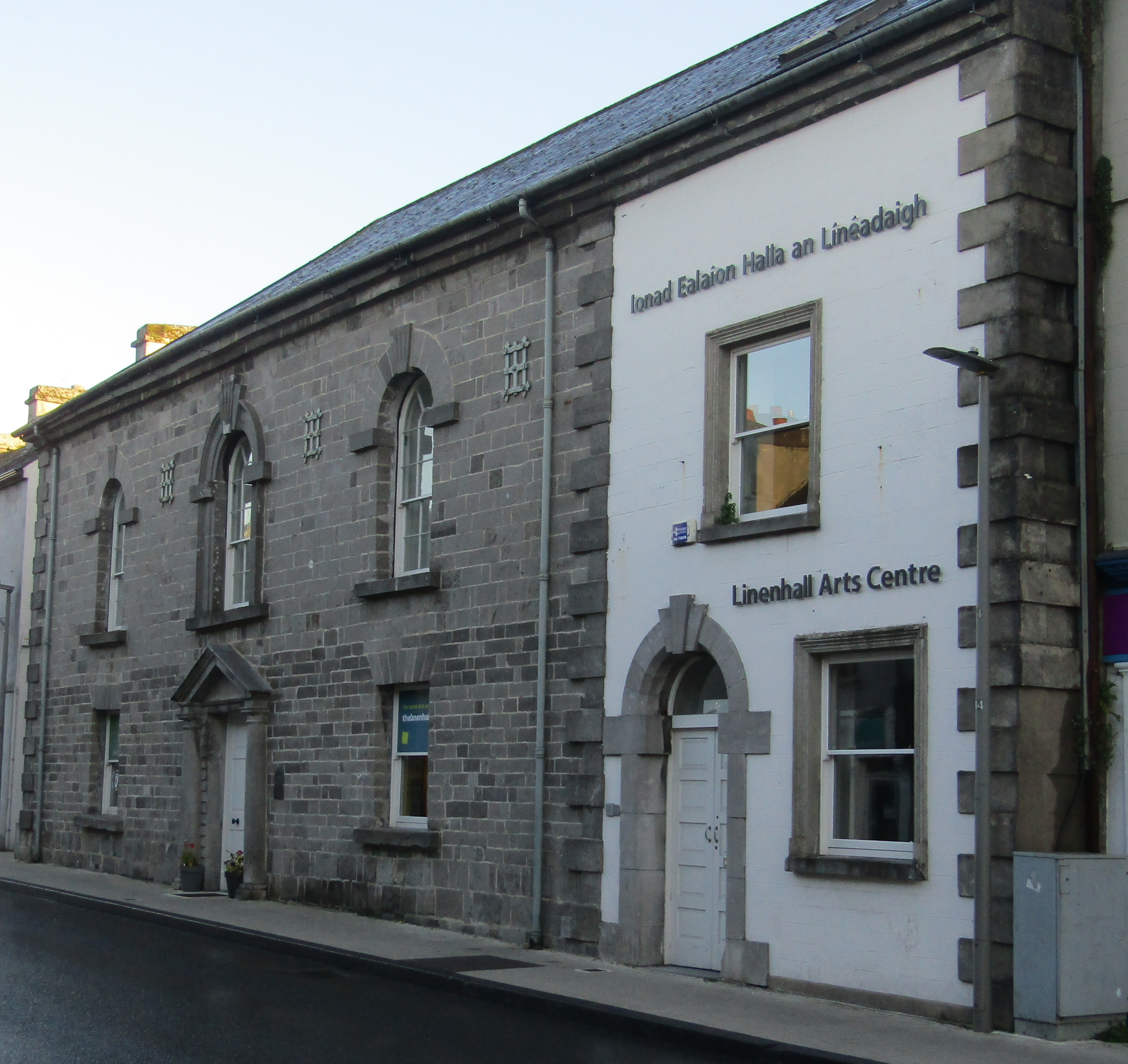
- Linenhall Arts Centre

- Location within Ireland

General information
- Architectural style: Italianate style
- Location: Linenhall Street, Castlebar, Ireland
- Coordinates: 53.8581°N 9.2975°W
- Completed: 1790

Linenhall Arts Centre (Irish: Ionad Ealaíon Halla an Línéadaigh), formerly Castlebar Town Hall (Irish: Halla an Bhaile Caisleán an Bharraigh), is a municipal building in Linenhall Street, Castlebar, County Mayo, Ireland. The building, which was used as the local town hall through much of the first half of the 20th century, is now used as an arts centre.

== History ==
The building was commissioned by Charles Bingham, 1st Earl of Lucan, whose seat was at Castlebar House, as a trading house for merchants buying and selling local linen goods. Some 200 looms were in use in the town when the linen industry was at its peak. It was designed in the Italianate style, built in ashlar stone and was completed in 1790.

The design involved a symmetrical main frontage of three bays facing onto the street. The central bay featured a doorway flanked by Doric order columns supporting a pediment; on the first floor there was a round headed window with a window sill, an architrave and a double keystone, while the outer bays were fenestrated by sash windows with window sills on the ground floor and by round headed windows with window sills, voussoirs and keystones on the first floor. At roof level, there was a cornice and a slate hipped roof. Internally, the principal room was the trading room on the ground floor and there was a gallery on the first floor.

During close hand-to-hand fighting, between the attacking French forces, under the command of General Jean Humbert, and the forces defending the British garrison, under the command of General Gerard Lake, at the battle of Castlebar during the Irish Rebellion of 1798, some shots damaged the doorcase of the building. After the battle Humbert used the building as a venue for a ball to celebrate his victory over the British forces and to rejoice at the proclamation of a short-lived provisional Irish Republic.

The local linen trade died out in the first half of the 18th century and, in the wake Great Famine in the late 1840s, the people of the town were allowed to make use of the building. However, by the 1860s, it was described as "neglected". In the late 19th century, George Bingham, 4th Earl of Lucan, decided to transfer ownership of the building to the people of the town on a long lease at a nominal rent and it re-opened as Castlebar Town Hall on 6 June 1894. It then served as a meeting place for Castlebar Urban District Council until councillors decided to relocate to larger premises at Marsh House in Newtown Street in September 1979.

The Education Centre, which had been established in the old Methodist Church on The Mall in 1976, relocated into the old town hall which then became the Linenhall Arts Centre in 1986. After the performance space had been completely restored, the building re-opened in September 2002.
