= Dún Laoghaire Institute of Art, Design and Technology =

Creative arts third level institution in suburban Dublin, Ireland

Coordinates: 53.280292°N 6.152882°W

- Institiúid Ealaíona, Dearadh agus Teicneolaíochta Dhún Laoghaire
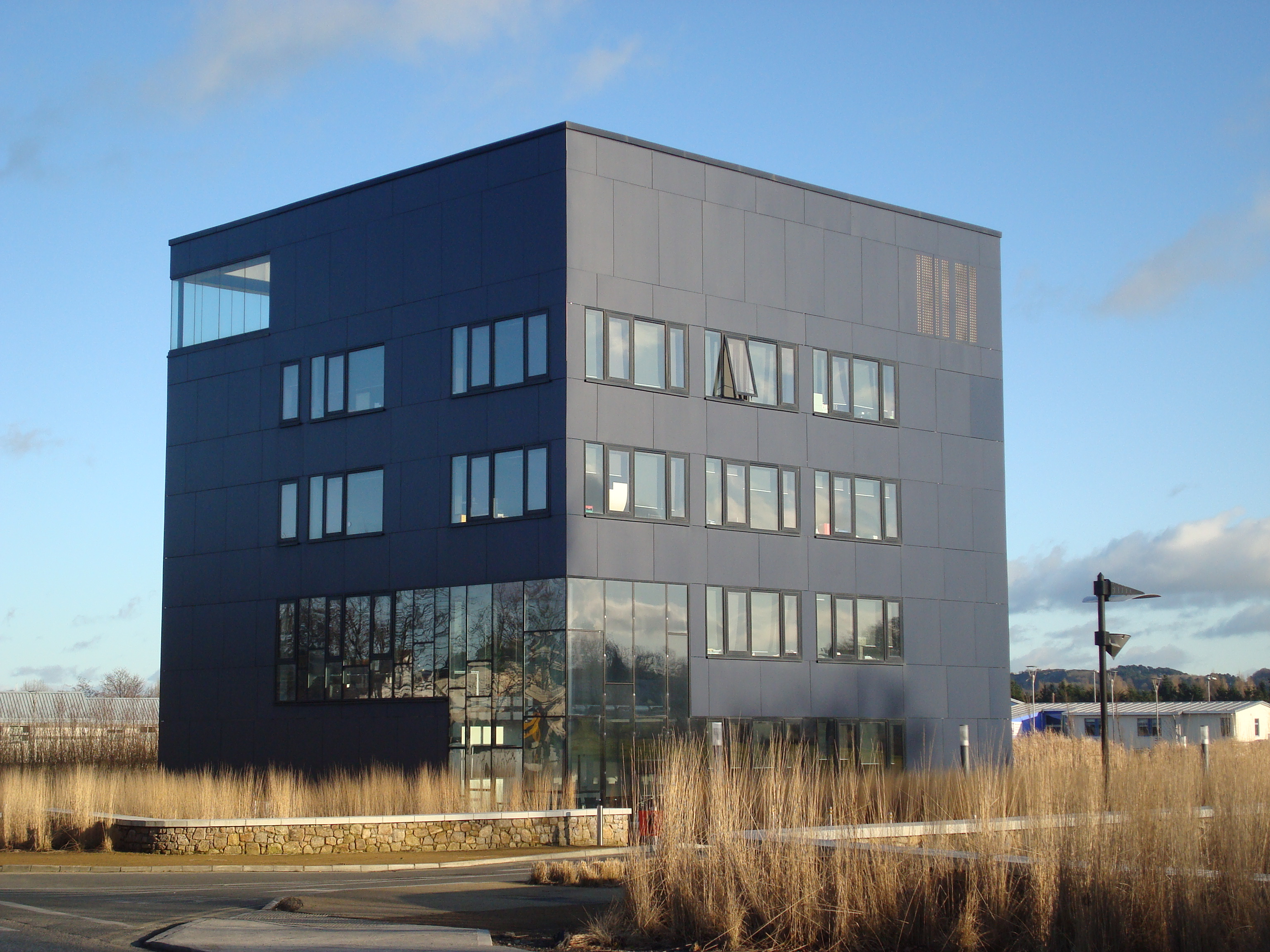
- The Media Cube situated at the entrance to the Institute
- Type: Institute of technology
- Established: 1 April 1997
- President: David Smith
- Registrar: Dr Andrew Power
- Faculty: 340 (2010)
- Administrative staff: 459 (2010)
- Students: 2,500 (2021/2012)
- Undergraduates: 2,180 (2021/2022)
- Postgraduates: 320
- Location: Kill Avenue; Dún Laoghaire, Dublin, Ireland
- Campus: 35 acres; Urban, 7 hectares (17 acres)
- Website: www.iadt.ie

Dún Laoghaire Institute of Art, Design and Technology (Irish: Institiúid Ealaíona, Dearadh agus Teicneolaíochta Dhún Laoghaire), more commonly known as IADT Dún Laoghaire or simply IADT is an institute of technology with a focus on art and design located in Deansgrange near Dún Laoghaire, Ireland. It was established in 1997 and incorporated the former Dún Laoghaire College of Art and Design as its School of Creative Arts.

== Academic work ==
=== Approach ===
The institution has an emphasis on creative arts and media with the National Film School (NFS) located on campus. The college offers programmes in entrepreneurship, arts and humanities, business, arts management, psychology/cyberpsychology, computing and digital media technology.

Emphasis is placed on the convergence of the arts, technology and enterprise. A flagship campus incubation centre called Media Cube supports the graduate enterprise development programme and accommodates start-up business in the media and digital media sectors.

=== Organisation ===
IADT has two faculties:

- Faculty of Film, Art and Creative Technologies
- Faculty of Enterprise and Humanities.

==== Faculty of Film, Art and Creative Technologies ====
Courses of the Faculty of Film, Art and Creative Technologies include:

- BSc (Honours) in Creative Media Technologies [replacing the BEng in Audio Visual Media Technology]
- BSc (Honours) in Creative Computing [replacing the BSc in Computing in Multimedia Programming and BSc (Honours) in Computing Multimedia Systems/ Web Engineering]
- BSc (Honours) in Applied Psychology
- BA (Honours) in Design in Model Making for Film and Media
- BA (Honours) in Design for Stage and Screen
- BA (Honours) in Animation
- BA (Honours) in Film & Television Production
- BA (Honours) in Photography
- BA (Honours) in Design in Visual Communications
- BA (Honours) in Art
- BA (Honours) in 3D Animation
- MA in Design for Change
- MSc in User Experience Design
- MSc in Cyberpsychology
- MA in Screenwriting
- MA in art, Research and Collaboration
- MA in Broadcast Production for Radio and Television

===== National Film School =====
The National Film School is part of IADT's Faculty of Film, Art and Creative Technologies. Launched in 2003, it was formed when the Dún Laoghaire Institute of Art, Design & Technology "[renamed] its film department as the National Film School". The school is a member of CILECT (the International Association of Film and Television Schools). It acts as a "centre of excellence" for film, animation, broadcasting and digital media. It offers the only BA Honours in Film and Television Production in the country, although the Huston School in Galway, Galway-Mayo Institute of Technology and Ballyfermot College of Further Education in Dublin do offer diplomas in film-related studies. The film school has previously hosted lectures by filmmakers including Liam O'Neill, Jim Sheridan, Oliver Stone, Neil Jordan, Stephen Frears, John Landis and Stephen Rea.

==== Faculty of Enterprise and Humanities ====
Formerly the School of Business and Humanities, the Faculty of Enterprise and Humanities focuses on the knowledge, media and entertainment sectors. Courses include:

- BA (Honours) in English, Media and Cultural Studies
- BA (Honours) in Business Studies and Arts Management
- Bachelor of Business (Honours) in Entrepreneurship & Management
- Bachelor of Business in Entrepreneurship
- Bachelor of Business (Honours) in Entrepreneurship
- Postgraduate Diploma in Cultural Event Management
- MA Public Culture Studies

== Campus ==
The institute is located on Kill Avenue, about two kilometres west of Dún Laoghaire, close to Bakers Corner and Deansgrange. The former Dún Laoghaire College of Art and Design (now part of the Faculty of Film, Art and Creative Technologies at IADT) moved to the campus in the early 1980s. This move facilitated an expansion of facilities and led to the creation of IADT in 1997. The college had strong ties with artist Diarmuid Larkin and his sons Seán and Derek who later worked there.

=== Campus history ===
The institute's site was a Christian Brothers home, Carriglea Park Industrial School, from 1894 to 1954. Prior to being bought by the Christian Brothers, Carriglea was a 40-acre (160,000 m^{2}) Georgian residence owned by the Goff family. The Reverend Robert Goff purchased the estate in 1826 for use as his principal residence. Goff died in 1844 and the estate passed to his wife and family. IADT has a collection of diaries written by the Reverend Robert Goff from the late 18th century until his death.

== Notable alumni ==
- Sara Baume, writer and artist
- Chloe Michelle Howarth, novelist
- Brendan Muldowney, screenwriter and film director
- Mark O'Connor, film director and screenwriter

== See also ==
- Education in the Republic of Ireland
- Third-level education in the Republic of Ireland
