= Christine Molloy =

Director and filmmaker

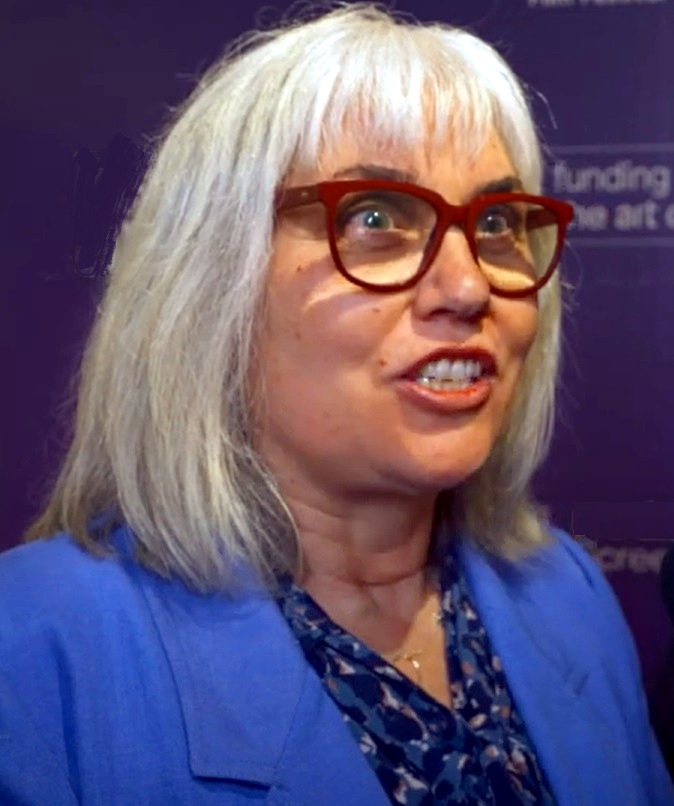
Christine Molloy at DIFF 2024

Christine Molloy, is a UK-based artist known for her works of theatre, interactive art, and film.

== Life and career ==
Molloy was born in Dublin, Ireland. She studied theatre in the late 1980s at Dartington College of Arts, UK, alongside her partner Joe Lawlor, both graduating in 1992. Molloy and Lawlor have together made works of theatre, interactive art, and film, as creative partnership Desperate Optimists, which also became the name of their production company.

== Career ==
In a 2016 article in Sight and Sound, Sophie Mayer described their filmmaking process as 'a unique merging of community arts (with months spent developing relationships and stories) and vérité documentary'.

== Filmography ==
Feature film

- Rose's War (2023)
- Act 3 (2026, documentary film)

TV Series

- The Yank
