= Brian Philip Davis =

Irish film and television editor (born 1981)

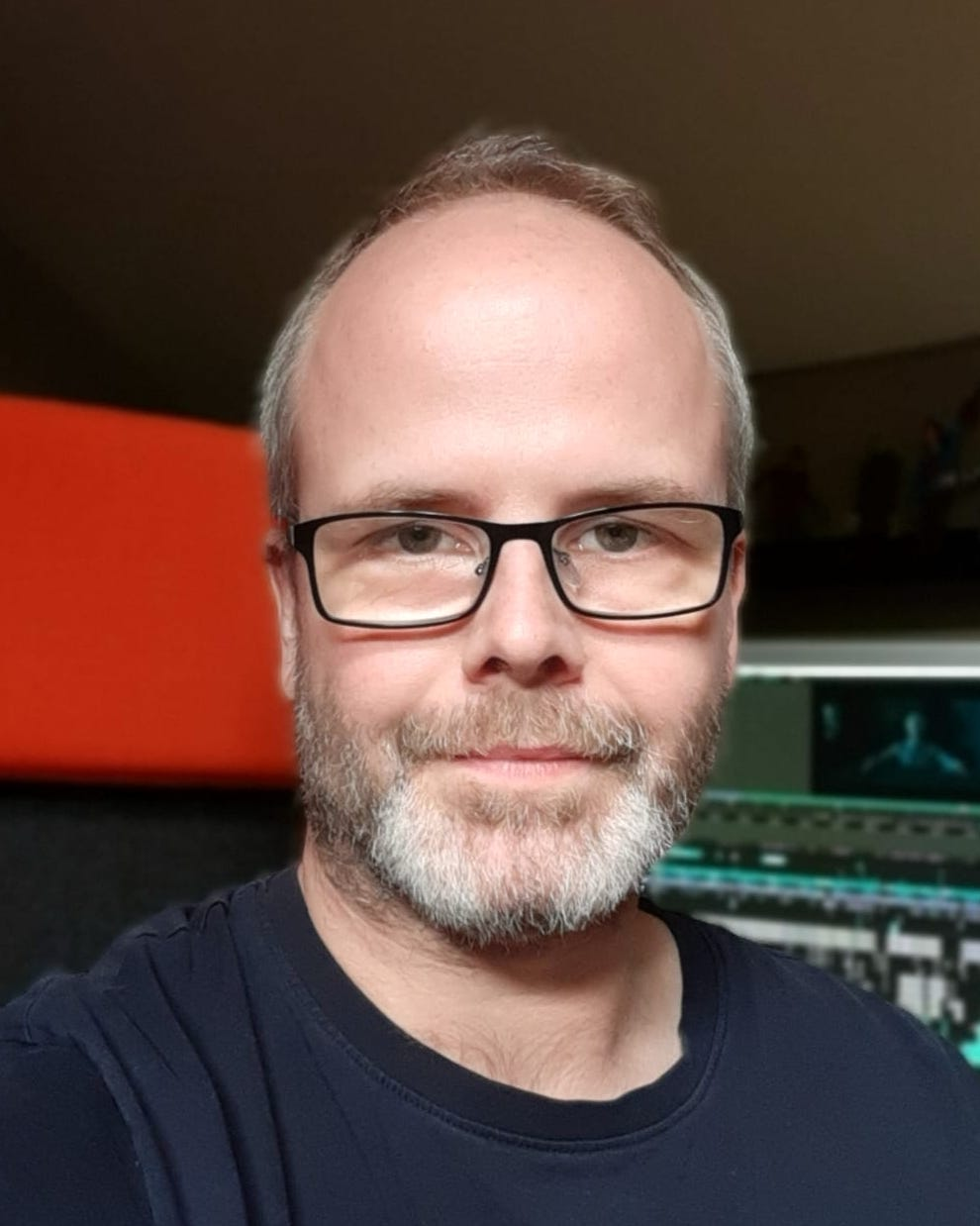
- Brian Philip Davis, August 2024
- Born: December 12, 1981 (age 44); Lisburn, Northern Ireland
- Education: Ulster University (BDes)
- Occupation: Film editor
- Years active: 2006–present
- Known for: Hokum; Oddity; The Incomer; Boys from County Hell

Brian Philip Davis (born 12 December 1981) is a film and television editor from Northern Ireland. His editing credits include the feature films Bad Day for the Cut (2017), Boys from County Hell (2020), Oddity (2024), and Hokum (2026). He is a member of British Film Editors, Irish Screen Editors, and the British Academy of Film and Television Arts.

== Early life and career ==
Davis was raised in Ballynahinch, Northern Ireland, later establishing his editing suite in Belfast. He studied Visual Communication at Ulster University (with a year at Centenary University in Hackettstown, New Jersey). Initially intending to pursue a career in graphic design, during his studies, he began experimenting with post-production using domestic DV tapes and iMovie, editing short films and music videos. Davis directed and edited official music videos for Oppenheimer and Two Door Cinema Club.

Between 2006 and 2012, Davis worked as a graphic artist within the art department on several film and television productions. His credits from this period include working on the feature films Kings (2007), Freakdog (2008), Cherrybomb (2009), and Ghost Machine (2009).

Early in his career, Davis worked as an editor for the Belfast-based independent children's television production company Sixteen South. During this period, he cut several prominent children's programmes, including Sesame Tree (the Northern Irish adaptation of Sesame Street), the CBeebies series Big & Small, Big City Park, and the animated series Lily's Driftwood Bay. He also edited Pajanimals, a co-production between Sixteen South and The Jim Henson Company.

== Independent genre cinema ==
After editing several short films in various genres, Davis served as an additional editor on David Freyne's horror film The Cured (2017), which won the Best Horror Feature award at Fantastic Fest. He subsequently collaborated with Chris Baugh on his thriller Bad Day for the Cut (2017), which premiered at the Sundance Film Festival. This established a multi-project partnership with Baugh, leading Davis to edit the horror-comedy Boys from County Hell (2020) and serve as lead editor on the BBC Three comedy-horror series Wreck (2022–2024). In 2018, Davis edited director Aislinn Clarke's debut found footage horror feature, The Devil's Doorway, which was distributed theatrically in the United States by IFC Midnight.

In 2024, Davis edited director Damian McCarthy's supernatural horror film Oddity, which went on to win the Fangoria Chainsaw Award for Best International Movie in 2025. The film was also nominated for Best International Film at the Saturn Awards. His work on the film focused extensively on structural pacing, and managing tension around the film's signature jump scares. In a review for Variety, critic Carlos Aguilar noted that "McCarthy and editor Brian Philip Davis deploy high-voltage moments with expert timing, using the dark to their favor in refreshing fashion."

Davis reunited with McCarthy for the 2026 horror film Hokum, starring Adam Scott and released by Neon. Reviewing the film for RogerEbert.com, critic Brian Tallerico lauded the technical execution, writing: "McCarthy works with editor Brian Philip Davis to give "Hokum" its rhythms. We're prone to praising editing often as "most" instead of best, usually looking at action blockbusters as the peak of the form, but the art of editing a horror film is essential to its success."

Also in 2026, he edited The Incomer, a folk comedy directed by Louis Paxton and starring Domhnall Gleeson, which won the NEXT Innovator Award at the Sundance Film Festival. The film was acquired for US distribution by Sumerian Pictures and by Universal's Focus Features in the UK, with a planned theatrical release scheduled later in 2026. Davis is represented internationally by United Talent Agency (UTA).

== Media and panel appearances ==
He has featured as a guest on film-craft podcasts including The Rough Cut and the /Film Weekly podcast, where he breaks down his approach to editing indie horror.

== Selected filmography ==
=== Film ===
Year	Title	Director	Notes
2013	Made in Belfast	Paul Kennedy	Feature film
2017	The Cured	David Freyne	Additional editor
2017	Bad Day for the Cut	Chris Baugh	Premiered at Sundance Film Festival
2017	Zoo	Colin McIvor	Feature film
2018	The Devil's Doorway	Aislinn Clarke	Distributed theatrically in the US by IFC Midnight
2020	Boys from County Hell	Chris Baugh	Feature film
2021	Here Before	Stacey Gregg	Feature film
2021	Let the Wrong One In	Conor McMahon	Feature film
2024	Oddity	Damian McCarthy	Feature film; nominated for a Saturn Award
2025	The Occupant	Hugo Keijzer	Feature film
2025	World Breaker	Brad Anderson	Feature film
2026	Hokum	Damian McCarthy	Released by Neon
2026	The Incomer	Louis Paxton	Winner of the Sundance NEXT Innovator Award
2027	A Body in the Woods	Stephen Cognetti	Starring Emma Roberts

=== Television ===
Year	Title	Director	Notes
2013	Stumpy's Brae	Chris Baugh	TV Movie; BBC One
2021	Dalgliesh	Andy and Ryan Tohill	TV Series (2 episodes); Channel 5 / Acorn TV
2022–2024	Wreck	Chris Baugh, Louis Paxton	TV Series (8 episodes); BBC Three
