= Caroline Menton =

Irish actress

- Born: Ireland
- Education: Drama Centre London (BA)
- Television: All Creatures Great and Small

Caroline Menton is an Irish film and television actress.

== Early life ==
She attended Alexandra College in Dublin and later graduated in 2021 from the Drama Centre London. She is a twin, her sister's name is Suzanne who she lives with in London.

== Career ==
She made her screen debut as Yana in Irish horror film Oddity (2024). In 2024, she could also be seen as Doris in British television series All Creatures Great and Small.

In 2025, she was confirmed as one of The Walsh Sisters in the television adaptation of the Marian Keyes novels, alongside Danielle Galligan, Louisa Harland, and Máiréad Tyers with Aidan Quinn and Carrie Crowley cast as their parents.

== Filmography ==
Year	Title	Role	Notes
2024	Oddity	Yana	Film
2024	All Creatures Great and Small	Doris	2 episodes
2025	The Walsh Sisters	Rachel Walsh	Leading role
