= Hokum (disambiguation) =

Hokum is a type of song in American blues music.

Hokum may refer to:

- A euphemism for nonsense
- The NATO code name for the Kamov Ka-50, a Russian attack helicopter
- The Bell-Bristol Aerospace Hokum-X, a U.S. Army target drone
- Hokum (film) (2026), an American horror film
