= Oddity (film) =

2024 film by Damian McCarthy

- Theatrical release poster
- Directed by: Damian McCarthy
- Written by: Damian McCarthy
- Produced by: Laura Tunstall; Mette-Marie Kongsved; Katie Holly; Evan Horan
- Starring: Gwilym Lee; Carolyn Bracken; Tadhg Murphy; Caroline Menton; Jonathan French; Steve Wall
- Cinematography: Colm Hogan
- Edited by: Brian Philip Davis
- Music by: Richard G. Mitchell
- Production companies: Keeper Pictures; Nowhere; Shudder
- Distributed by: Wildcard Distribution
- Release dates: 8 March 2024 (SXSW); 30 August 2024 (Ireland)
- Running time: 98 minutes
- Country: Ireland
- Language: English
- Box office: $1.9 million

Oddity is a 2024 Irish horror film written and directed by Damian McCarthy. It follows a blind medium and curio shopkeeper who is still grieving the death of her twin sister a year prior, when a wooden golem from her collection becomes crucial to her quest to uncover the truth about her sister's murder.

The film premiered at South by Southwest on 8 March 2024, where it won the Audience Award in the Midnighter section. It was released in Ireland and the United Kingdom on 30 August 2024.

== Plot ==
Dani Odello-Timmis, the wife of psychiatrist Ted Timmis, stays alone in the couple's newly acquired country house near Cork. Olin Boole, one of Ted's former patients, visits Dani one evening, warning her that a stranger has infiltrated the home. Later, Dani is brutally murdered. Olin, believed to be the murderer, is later found in a halfway house, his head smashed to pieces.

A year later, Ted visits Dani's twin sister Darcy Odello at her Cabinet of Curiosities shop, which she inherited from her mother. Ted gives Darcy Olin's glass eye, which she had asked for. Darcy, a blind clairvoyant with psychometric powers, uses the eye to read it for visions of Dani's final moments. Darcy then enters her inner store, which contains collections of various antique items, including a rabbit doll similar to the one from Caveat on a cabinet. She navigates toward a chest in the corner, slowly approaching and silently touching this oddity. As she does, the rabbit clangs its cymbals once.

Several days later, Darcy arrives unexpectedly at the country house where Ted now resides with his new girlfriend, Yana. Prior to her arrival, Darcy had sent them a chest containing a life-sized wooden golem. She explains that a witch gave it to her mother and describes it as a gift to the couple.

Ted departs for his night shift at the hospital. The uncomfortable Yana tries to leave but cannot find her car keys. Darcy tells her that Dani was actually killed by Ivan, a brutish orderly at the hospital. Yana becomes alarmed when she notices the golem has inexplicably changed position. Upon examining it, she finds several strange objects inside five holes in its head, including photographs of Dani and Darcy, a lock of hair, a tooth, and a vial of blood. Darcy angrily demands that Yana put the items back, which she does before going to bed. After observing Dani's apparition, a panicked Yana flees her bedroom, finds her car keys inside the golem's crate, and drives away.

When Ted returns to the house, Darcy accuses him of being responsible for Dani's murder. Darcy reveals that she killed Olin but, upon reading his glass eye, discovered he was innocent. She accuses Ted of enlisting Ivan to murder Dani so Ted could be with Yana and not lose the house in a divorce. Olin overheard a conversation between Ted and Ivan about killing Dani. Upon his release from the hospital that evening, Olin went to the house to warn Dani to no avail.

To prove his innocence, Ted offers to bring in the investigator for the case. Claiming not to have his number, Ted leaves his cell phone with Darcy and tells her he'll go to his office, call the investigator, and tell him to phone her. Ted returns to the hospital and calls his cell phone. When Darcy goes to retrieve it, she falls through a trap door that Ted had opened. She crashes onto the stone floor below, severely wounded. At Ted's command, Ivan visits the house to ensure Darcy's fate, only to be stalked and assaulted by the wooden golem, which Darcy appears to supernaturally animate. Shortly after, Darcy succumbs to her wounds.

Ivan survives the attack, claims the golem did it, and is committed to the psychiatric hospital by Ted. Ted incinerates the golem and, to tie up loose ends, unshackles a violent cannibal who kills and eats Ivan. Ted returns to the country house and lives alone; Yana ends their relationship, disturbed by Ted's willingness to live in a home where two people died.

On the doorstep, Ted finds a small box delivered from Darcy's oddities shop. Inside is a call bell that Darcy had earlier shown him, which she explained is haunted by the ghost of a bellhop who kills whoever rings it. Ted rings the bell to prove the rationalist worldview he had argued to Darcy. With no indication of the spirit, he relaxes, unaware of the bellhop's ghost standing behind him.

== Cast ==
- Carolyn Bracken as Dani Odello-Timmis / Darcy Odello
- Gwilym Lee as Ted Timmis, a psychiatrist and Dani's husband
- Tadhg Murphy as Olin Boole
- Caroline Menton as Yana, Ted's girlfriend
- Steve Wall as Ivan
- Jonathan French as Declan Barrett

== Production ==
The film was shot in the same converted barn in County Cork, Ireland, as McCarthy's first film, Caveat. McCarthy was developing Oddity at the same time he was working on Caveat.

Effects artist Paul McDonnell created the life-size wooden golem with input from McCarthy. McCarthy cites films like Child's Play and Creepshow as influences. "I'm a big fan of those old 'doll comes to life' films," he said in 2024. "But they're always small, and I thought it would be cool to have one that's your size, that would be a force to reckon with if it did come alive."

McCarthy, who frequently browses antique stores, acquired many of the props for the film himself. The character Olin Boole was the subject of McCarthy's 2013 short film How Olin Lost His Eye, which explores the character's backstory.

== Release ==
In February 2024, Blue Finch Films acquired the international distribution rights for the film. The film premiered at South by Southwest on 8 March 2024, where it won the Audience Award in the Midnighter section of the festival. It won the Audience Award for Feature Film at the Overlook Film Festival in April 2024.

The film was released in the United States on 19 July 2024, prior to playing at the 28th Fantasia International Film Festival on 4 August 2024. It was released by Wildcard Distribution in Ireland and the United Kingdom on 30 August 2024.

=== Home media ===
Oddity was released on VOD on August 20, 2024, and on Blu-ray and DVD on October 22, 2024.

== Reception ==
=== Critical response ===
On the review aggregator website Rotten Tomatoes, 96% of 133 critics' reviews are positive, with an average rating of 7.5/10. The website's consensus reads: "An elegant and spooky ghost story punctuated with clever jolts, Oddity hews to the fundamentals of fright and achieves shout-inducing results." Metacritic, which uses a weighted average, assigned the film a score of 78 out of 100, based on 18 critics, indicating "generally favorable" reviews.

Writing for RogerEbert.com, Sheila O'Malley praised the film and awarded it with three and a half out of four stars, calling it "unnerving and unsettling", noting: "I won't say more than this: the final frame is so perfect it exceeds expectations. The moment is a call-back, but it's also a glimpse of the future. It makes me wish I had seen Oddity in a packed midnight show. McCarthy does the hardest thing of all: he sticks the landing." Alison Foreman of IndieWire gave the film a B+, describing the film as presenting a "a brilliant, bespoke, and tightly entertaining string of ideas that work stronger as a collection — with even these missteps feeling like they branch from a unified center", and further describing it as a standout in Shudder's filmography.
