= Enyi Okoronkwo =

British actor

- Born: London, England
- Education: Queen Mary University; Central School of Speech and Drama
- Occupation: Actor
- Years active: 2015–present

Enyi Okoronkwo is a British stage and television actor.

== Early life ==
From London with Nigerian heritage, he attended Queen Mary University before graduating with an MA from the Central School of Speech and Drama.

== Career ==
=== Stage ===
In 2015 he appeared in Arthur's World at the Bush Theatre. He joined the cast of Wonder.land, a musical inspired by Lewis Carroll's Alice in Wonderland, featuring music by Damon Albarn and book and lyrics by Moira Buffini, at the Royal National Theatre. In 2017, he appeared in Junkyard at the Bristol Old Vic before moving with the production to the Rose Theatre Kingston.

In 2018, he joined a Bristol Old Vic and Royal Exchange Theatre co-production of Anton Chekov's The Cherry Orchard. That year, he could be seen in a production of Donald Margulies' black comedy play The Model Apartment.

He appeared in The Haystack by Al Blyth at the Hampstead Theatre in 2020. In 2022, he was in a Bristol Old Vic production of Dr Semmelweis with Mark Rylance. In 2023, he appeared in The Meaning of Zong at the Barbican Theatre.

=== Film and television ===
He appeared in the television series Giri/Haji and The Lazarus Project, both written by Joe Barton.

In 2022, he appeared as Puck in a Sacha Bennett directed adaptation of A Midsummer Night's Dream. He also made an appeared in the Robert Popper comedy series I Hate You on Channel 4.

In 2024, he played the character Rasselas in the Disney+ fantasy drama series Renegade Nell, alongside Adrian Lester and Louisa Harland.

In 2025, he could be seen in British historical drama series Amadeus as Lorenzo Da Ponte.

== Filmography ==
| Year | Title | Role | Notes |
|---|---|---|---|
| 2019 | Giri/Haji | James | |
| 2022 | The Lazarus Project | Laurence | |
| 2022 | I Hate You | Waiter | |
| 2022 | A Midsummer's Night Dream | Puck | |
| 2023 | Funny Woman | AD Director | |
| 2024 | Renegade Nell | Rasselas | |
| 2025 | Amadeus | Lorenzo Da Ponte | |
