= T. J. Scott =

Director, stunt performer and actor

TJ Scott
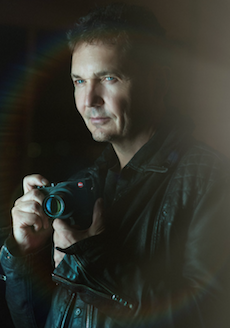
- Scott in 2015
- Born: Canada
- Education: York University
- Occupations: Film director, television director, screenwriter, producer
- Years active: 1972–present
- Spouse: Victoria Pratt (m. 2000; div. 2016)

T. J. Scott is a Canadian film and television director, screenwriter, producer, and former stuntman and actor. He is primarily known for his work directing popular television series such as Orphan Black, Xena: Warrior Princess, Gotham, Star Trek: Discovery, Longmire, 12 Monkeys, The Strain, and Spartacus.

Scott has won accolades for his directing work. In 2010, he received a Gemini Award nomination for directing the Discovery Channel made-for-television film Deadliest Sea. In 2015, for his work on Orphan Black, he won a Canadian Screen Award for Best Direction in a Dramatic Series. In 2019, he was nominated for another Canadian Screen Award, this time for Best Direction in a Dramatic Program or Limited Series, for directing the CBC miniseries Caught. In 2022, as one of the executive producers of the Global TV/Peacock series Departure (on which he was also the sole director), Scott received a nomination for the Canadian Screen Award for Best Dramatic Series.

== Career ==
=== 1990s–2000s: Early feature film and television work ===
Scott began directing feature films in the early 1990s, with the action-science fiction martial arts film TC 2000 (1993). Of the experience as a first-time director, Scott said:

You know, I was very young... I took the first feature that was offered to me... I think we all learned a lot while we were making it.

Later that decade, Scott directed Legacy (1998), starring David Hasselhoff and his future wife, Victoria Pratt. Legacy screened as the opening night film for the Las Vegas Film Festival in 1999.

The following year, Scott wrote, directed, and produced the HBO film Blacktop (2000), starring Kristen Davis. Around this time, Scott's career as a television director began to take off. He first worked in New Zealand with filmmakers Robert Tapert and Sam Raimi on Hercules: The Legendary Journeys (1995–1999) and subsequently directed several episodes of the spin-off TV series Xena: Warrior Princess (1996–2001).

After working on Xena, Scott directed several episodes of the series Cleopatra 2525 (2000–2001) before its cancellation. He then moved onto other shows, including the controversial ESPN series Playmakers (2003). Scott's episode of Playmakers was named by the American Film Institute as one of the top 10 television episodes of 2003. Around this time, Scott also directed several episodes of Mutant X (2001–2002).

Scott directed the made-for-television film Deadliest Sea (2009), which aired on the Discovery Channel and was nominated for five Gemini Awards in 2010 including Best Direction in a Dramatic Program or Mini-Series.

=== 2010s–2020s: Breakthrough as a television director and producer ===
Throughout 2010s, Scott directed dozens of television episodes for series such as Spartacus (2012–2013), Bitten (2014–2015), Longmire (2014–present), Gotham (2014–2019), The Strain (2015–present) Dark Matter (2015–2018).

In 2015, Scott directed episodes of the BBC America-Space television series Orphan Black, which, upon release, garnered a cult following, and significant critical acclaim. In January 2015, it was announced that Scott was nominated by the Academy of Canadian Cinema & Television, Canada's equivalent to the Emmys, for his work on the show. In February 2015, Scott won the award for Best Direction in a Dramatic Series at the 3rd annual Canadian Screen Awards for his work on Orphan Black. Following Orphan Black, Scott continued to direct high-profile television series, such as Star Trek: Discovery and Taken.

In 2018, his work on the Canadian miniseries Caught garnered him a Canadian Screen Award nomination for Best Direction in a Dramatic Program or Limited Series.

From 2019 to 2021, Scott executive produced and directed three seasons of Departure. The series, commissioned by Global Television Network as a British-Canadian co-production, stars Archie Panjabi, Christopher Plummer, Claire Forlani, Kris Holden-Ried, Rebecca Liddiard, and Shazad Latif, among others. The series was later picked up by NBCUniversal's streaming service, Peacock, for a September 2020 release. During the first season's release in Canada and the UK, the series averaged more than one million viewers per episode. Notably, Plummer's work in the second season of Departure was his final on-screen performance before his death on February 5, 2021. Scott made a post on Instagram commemorating Plummer's death, writing "I was lucky enough to be the last person to ever direct Christopher Plummer on screen ... I will never forget what a beautiful person he was ... A true pro till the very end who knew what matters."

In 2022, as one of the executive producers of the Global TV/Peacock series Departure, Scott received a nomination for the Canadian Screen Award for Best Dramatic Series.

=== Other work ===
In addition to directing, Scott is also a well-known photographer. He also works as a freelance writer in Hollywood, co-writing the story for the film Tracers (2015), starring Taylor Lautner. In September 2011, it was announced that filmmaker Chris Columbus signed on to direct Scott's screenplay titled The Secret Lives of Road Crews for Paramount Pictures.

From 2015 to 2017, Scott served as an executive producer on the popular web series Teenagers.

== Personal life ==
Scott married Canadian actress and model Victoria Pratt in 2000; they subsequently divorced in 2016.

== Awards and nominations ==
Year	Association	Category	Nominated work	Result
2010	Gemini Awards	Best Direction in a Dramatic Program or Mini-Series	Deadliest Sea	Nominated
2015	Canadian Screen Awards	Best Direction in a Drama Series	Orphan Black	Won
2019	Canadian Screen Awards	Best Direction in a Dramatic Program or Limited Series	Caught	Nominated
2022	Canadian Screen Awards	Best Dramatic Series	Departure	Nominated
