= Boys from County Hell =

2020 Irish film

- Film poster
- Directed by: Chris Baugh
- Written by: Chris Baugh, Brendan Mullin (Co-Story By)
- Produced by: Brendan Mullin, Yvonne Donohoe
- Starring: Jack Rowan; Nigel O'Neill; Louisa Harland; Michael Hough
- Cinematography: Ryan Kernaghan
- Edited by: Brian Philip Davis
- Music by: Steve Lynch
- Release date: April 2020 (Tribeca)
- Running time: 89 minutes
- Country: Ireland
- Language: English

Boys From County Hell is a 2020 Irish vampire comedy horror film.

== Plot ==
In rural Northern Ireland, an elderly couple start to bleed profusely from their nose, ears and eyes in their front room. As an unseen figure enters the room, they both scream in terror.

Two months earlier, in a pub, friends Eugene and William discuss their aspirations. William's family owns a nearby field with a cairn, under which Abhartach was buried. Thanks to the local legend of Abhartach, which was supposedly Bram Stoker's inspiration for Dracula, the cairn, and by extension their town Six Mile Hill, is a minor tourist attraction. Despite this, Eugene, William, and their friend SP, often spend their time tricking and frightening tourists looking for the cairn.

Eugene works for his father Francie's construction company. Francie coerces Eugene to help with a lucrative job, digging up land to make way for a new bypass. The project would obliterate much of William's family's land. William confides in Eugene that he will have to emigrate to Australia once the construction takes place.

While walking through the field, Eugene admits to William that his father's company will destroy the fields, and the pair fight. Not hearing his father George's warnings, William is rushed by a bull, which gores him against the cairn and kills him. William's blood seeps into the soil. After William's funeral, Eugene, Francie and SP are thrown out of the local pub, The Stoker, for jeopardising the town's tourist income.

Construction begins in the field, and Eugene personally destroys the cairn. Later that night, Eugene and his friend Claire drunkenly exchange stories about their own bereavements. Charlie, a construction worker, is attacked by an unseen figure.

Eugene, Francie, Claire, SP and Gabriel arrive at the site for work the next morning to find that the cairn has been restored and Charlie is missing. At the end of the shift, as it gets dark, Charlie appears, confused and bleeding. While driving to the hospital, Charlie lunges at Eugene, causing him to crash the van. The lamps power down, and Gabriel is snatched into the darkness.

Francie and SP go in search of Gabriel while Claire and Eugene go to the portacabin to find torches. There, Eugene is attacked by a feral Charlie, who is impaled by Claire with a metal pole through the heart. Gabriel is found dead, his throat cut. Charlie attacks again, and is seemingly unkillable. Claire manages to bury him under soil and rubble, which eventually kills him. Meanwhile, Gabriel's blood has run into the ground beneath the cairn stones, causing Abhartach to rise up from the earth.

The group flee into George's house, where his wife Pauline is still catatonic after William's death. A tearful George holds the group at gunpoint as he invites Eugene to discover that William is now a feral vampire, and is being kept in a cell in the house; George had used sheep to feed him. George reveals that it is the cairn stones, not a bite, that turns someone into a vampire. Now being unable to move house, he purposefully infected Charlie to put an end to the road construction. The group resolve to help George kill the vampires.

They set up a trap to kill William; Eugene releases him from his cell and runs into another room, where George is waiting with an axe to decapitate him. However, before he can swing the axe, Pauline shoots George in the shoulder and tries to hug William. William slices her throat and drinks her blood before attacking and killing George. The group manage to ambush and subdue William, locking him in a coffin, but SP is killed in the struggle.

In the town, Abhartach attacks a young man, Brian, and is able to take his blood from a distance. He later does the same to Al, a local policeman, Claire's mother Marie, The Stoker's landlord Thomas, and the elderly couple from the prologue.

Eugene, Claire and Francie bury William under soil and cairn stones and drive their dump truck into the town, where most of the locals have had their blood drained. Claire stays with Marie and her stepfather James to stem the flow of blood, while Eugene and Francie determine that Abhartach's lair is at Eugene's late mother's house, due to the proximity of dead animals nearby.

Abhartach drinks the town's blood as Eugene and Francie arrive, and the two start to bleed. Francie knocks Eugene unconscious and confronts Abhartach himself. He beheads the vampire with an axe, but Abhartach reanimates and slices his leg. The pair escape outside through a rubble chute and hide in a barn as dawn rises, but the sunlight has no effect on the creature. Cornered and helpless, Eugene uses the only weapon he has to hand to momentarily stun the creature - his father's half-severed leg, which Eugene pulls off his body and impales Abhartach, before burying him under soil and stones. The townspeople awake from their ordeal, and Francie finally tells Eugene he did a grand job.

Three months later, Eugene and Claire have a final drink before she leaves for Australia for a year, and Eugene's house has finally been renovated. Abhartach remains buried in the barn, under a cairn made of stone, brick and slate.

== Cast ==
- Jack Rowan as Eugene Moffat
- Nigel O'Neill as Francie Moffat
- Louisa Harland as Claire McCann
- Michael Hough as SP McCauley
- John Lynch as George Bogue
- Fra Fee as William Bogue
- Jordan Renzo as Christian
- Lalor Roddy as Elliott
- Morgan C. Jones as Charlie Harte
- Andrea Irvine as Pauline Bogue
- Robert Strange as Abhartach
- Marty Maguire as Gabriel
- Kathy Monahan as Marie McCann
- Emma Paetz as Michelle
- David Pearse as Cathal
- Stella McCusker as Pearl
- Conor Grimes as Thomas
- Bronagh Elmore as Eugene's mum
- Parnell Scott as teenage boy
- Ellie McKay as teenage girl
- Liam Miley as himself
- Steven Miller as himself

== Production ==
The film is directed by Chris Baugh, who also co-wrote the film with Brendan Mullin, expanding on a previous short film of the same name. Screen Ireland and Northern Ireland Screen were among the funders of the film. The film was filmed entirely on location in Northern Ireland, in County Tyrone.

== Release ==
Boys From County Hell received its world premiere at the 2020 Tribeca Film festival.

== Critical reception ==
The film has a rating of 83% on Rotten Tomatoes based on 58 reviews with the consensus "Boys from County Hell stands out as an uncommonly good time in the crowded vampire genre -- and proves the Irish countryside is a fine setting for slaying the undead." Metacritic, which uses a weighted average, assigned the film a score of 56 out of 100, based on 5 critics, indicating "mixed or average" reviews.

Writing in The Guardian, Phil Hoad found that the film, although inventive and amusing, did not always successfully mesh its comedy and horror aspects. Jordan King in Empire magazine also applauded its inventiveness, but also praised the depth of characterisation, describing it as "a playful yet surprisingly poignant vampire yarn that takes on folklore, familial turmoil, and the perils of poor town-planning with aplomb."

== Accolades ==
At the 2021 Neuchâtel International Fantastic Film Festival, Baugh and the film won the jury prize for best European Fantastic Film.
