= Florence Ordesh =

Irish actress

- Born: London, England
- Occupation: Actress
- Years active: 2010–present

Florence Ordesh is an Irish actress. She is best known for playing Fiona in the horror film Hokum and Rose Tate in the drama series Departure.

== Early life ==
Ordesh was born in London, England. She is of Persian descent on her fathers side while her mother is Irish. Her family moved to Ireland when she was a child and was raised in rural surroundings in County Meath. She is a graduate of the Vancouver School of Arts and Academics.

== Career ==
Ordesh started off her career by appearing in Canadian short films. Her first appearance in an Irish show was a one-off episode in the miniseries Saor Sinn ó Olc She gained popularity in the states after playing Rose Tate in the drama series Departure featuring Christopher Plummer in his final role before passing. Her biggest role so far has been playing Fiona in the horror film Hokum starring Adam Scott. As of June 2026 she is filming a psychological thriller film called Dark Side of June where she will play the lead role. She is also the writer and director of the film.

== Personal life ==
She is the founder of CastandHire in Ireland, which is the number one collaborative and educational platform, housing thousands of members’ profiles, also providing digital Master Classes from industry experts. She is currently residing between Vancouver and Los Angeles.

== Filmography ==
=== Film ===
Year	Title	Role	Notes
2010	Mayan Calendar: The True Story of the Apocalypse	Itzel	Short
2011	Their First Last Date	Ms Babe	Short
2012	Dublin 47	Stephanie	
2014	Follow: Tall Tales from a Small City	Charlotte	Short
2015	The Observation Level	Adrianna	Short
2017	Life Begins Now	Saoirse Ornam	
2018	Buy the Dip	Polly	
2018	Point of No Return	Terri	
2021	Quiche isn't Sexy	Jackie	Short
2022	An Extinction	Aoife	
2023	The Hard Hit	Linda O' Connor	
2026	Hokum	Fiona	
2026	The Dark Side of June	June	
2026	The Three Musketeers	Celine	

=== Television ===
Year	Title	Role	Notes
2011	Saor Sinn ó Olc	Ally	Episode; The Fear
2013	The Hurler	Suzy the Deaf Girl	Episode; The Interview
2018	Storyland	Maria	Episode; Everything Not Saved
2019	Hidden Assets	Mel Royce	2 episodes
2020	Cold Courage	Shakeela Husain	2 episodes
2021	Departure	Rose Tate	4 episodes
2021	Foundation	Briwan	Episode; Preparing to Live
2025	Dr. Death	Ciara Purcell	Episode; Episode #3.6
