= Renegade Nell =

2024 British television series

- Promotional poster
- Also known as: The Ballad of Renegade Nell
- Genre: Action-adventure; Historical fantasy
- Created by: Sally Wainwright
- Written by: Sally Wainwright; Emme Hoy; Georgia Christou
- Directed by: Ben Taylor; Amanda Brotchie; MJ Delaney
- Starring: Louisa Harland; Frank Dillane; Alice Kremelberg; Enyi Okoronkwo; Jake Dunn; Bo Bragason; Florence Keen; Pip Torrens; Nick Mohammed; Joely Richardson; Adrian Lester
- Composers: Oli Julian; Nick Foster
- Country of origin: United Kingdom
- Original language: English
- No. of series: 1
- No. of episodes: 8

Production
- Executive producers: Sally Wainwright; Faith Penhale; Will Johnston; Louise Mutter; Johanna Devereaux
- Producers: Jon Jennings; Stella Herz
- Running time: 37-53 minutes
- Production company: Lookout Point TV

Original release
- Network: Disney+
- Release: 29 March 2024

Renegade Nell (originally developed as The Ballad of Renegade Nell) is a British historical fantasy action-adventure television series created and written by Sally Wainwright and starring Louisa Harland. Produced by Lookout Point for Disney+, the series premiered on 29 March 2024. Set in a fantasy version of 18th-century England, Nell Jackson (Harland) becomes a highwaywoman—and the most feared person in the country—after being framed for murder. With the help of a magical sprite called Billy Blind, Nell realizes that her destiny is bigger than she ever imagined. In July 2024, Disney canceled the series after one season.

== Cast ==
- Louisa Harland as Nell "Nelly" Jackson, a young fugitive
- Adrian Lester as Robert Hennessey, Earl of Poynton
- Nick Mohammed as Billy Blind, a fairy that grants Nell her powers
- Bo Bragason as Roxy Trotter, Nell's younger sister
- Florence Keen as George Trotter, Nell's youngest sister
- Craig Parkinson as Sam Trotter, Nell's father
- Enyi Okoronkwo as Rasselas, a young stable boy
- Frank Dillane as Charles Devereux, aka Isambard Tulley, a wanted highwayman
- Alice Kremelberg as Sofia Wilmot, daughter of a magistrate and an ambitious widow
- Jake Dunn as Thomas Blancheford, Sofia's brother and the magistrate's heir
- Pip Torrens as Lord Blancheford, a magistrate and the Trotters' landlord
- Jodhi May as Queen Anne
- Joely Richardson as newspaper magnate Lady Eularia Moggerhanger
- Iz Hesketh as Valerian, Lady Eularia's attendant
- Ashna Rabheru as Polly Honeycombe, a young noblewoman with literary aspirations

== Production ==
In April 2021 it was revealed that Disney+ had acquired the series from British screenwriter Sally Wainwright. Ben Taylor, Amanda Brotchie and MJ Delaney are directing episodes. Faith Penhale, Will Johnston, Louise Mutter and Johanna Deveraux are executive producers. Jon Jennings is series producer and Stella Merz producer.

In a Radio Times interview following the series' premiere, director Ben Taylor said a second season was being written and would likely involve a time jump; Disney had yet to confirm whether there would indeed be a second season at the time of the interview's publication. In July 2024, the series was ultimately cancelled after its first season, with Disney saying the decision not to renew the series was based on "several metrics".

=== Casting ===
In August 2022, Louisa Harland, Nick Mohammed, Joely Richardson, and Adrian Lester were announced as being among the cast for the series.

=== Filming ===
Principal photography was reported to have started in April 2022 with a nine-month schedule for the planned eight episodes. Joely Richardson was pictured in costume at Oxford's Bodleian Library in October 2022. Other filming locations included Hampton Court Palace, Bourne Wood in Farnham, Rousham House in Oxfordshire, Broughton Castle (the Blancheford's manor house) also in Oxfordshire, and the Old Royal Naval College in Greenwich.

== Broadcast ==
Renegade Nell streamed on Disney+ beginning on 29 March 2024.

== Episodes ==
| No. | Title | Directed by | Written by | Original release date |
|---|---|---|---|---|
| 1 | "Don't Call Me Nelly" | Ben Taylor | Sally Wainwright | 29 March 2024 |
Outlaw Isambard Tulley and his gang rob a carriage in the forest, but are run off by Nell Jackson, returning home widowed from war after being absent for many years, and magically bestowed with recurring superhuman strength. Once home with her father, Sam Trotter, and two little sisters, Roxy and George, she eventually receives a warm reception. The party in her honor is crashed by Thomas Blancheford, cruel son of the local magistrate, whom Nell fights over his harassment of Roxy. After an initial struggle, she beats and humiliates Thomas. That night, Nell is woken by Billy Blind, a fairy who has been granting her superhuman strength for reasons unknown even to himself. Thomas seeks help with his accrued debts from Robert Hennessey, Earl of Poynton, who possesses knowledge of the dark arts. Poynton gradually suggests that Thomas must prove himself, and Thomas proceeds to murder Nell’s father. While Thomas’ father, Lord Blancheford, takes measures to cover up the crime, Rasselas, their footman, informs Nell’s sisters of the truth. They go to the city to find Nell, who has been prevented from joining the army, and has encountered Isambard Tulley, here going by the name “Charles Devereux.” Nell is advised by Billy Blind to seek justice through the proper channels. The sisters return to the Blancheford estate, where Lord Blancheford offers them tenancy of the family tavern in exchange for their silence. He later reneges on this deal at Thomas’ urging. Nell returns to demand Lord Blancheford prosecute Thomas, and after he agrees, Thomas shoots him in the head. Thomas blames Nell for the murder and is supported by his sister Sofia, to the disbelief of Rasselas. Together, Rasselas and Nell escape, gather Nell's sisters and go on the run.
| 2 | "Tracks Less Well Trod" | Ben Taylor | Sally Wainwright | 29 March 2024 |
Nell hijacks a carriage, and as she robs the passengers, Billy reveals he has obligations to protect her, although he dissembles as to why. As the authorities, including Thomas and Sofia, make plans to capture Nell, she decides to head west to leave Roxy and George with their uncle and continue on to America. Back at the mansion, Poynton congratulates Thomas on murdering his father and says he shows promise. Roxy talks about her crush on Rasselas and relays his past as an enslaved prince of Benin, when her story is interrupted by Charles Devereux. He tells Nell about the new bounty on her head and warns her against leaving her sisters with family, suggesting they team up instead. Nell reluctantly agrees and they head to a nearby inn disguised as a noble retinue. Following Lord Blancheford's funeral, Sofia and Poynton discuss Nell's supernatural powers and he offers his assistance in her capture. Nell and her party's disguise is rumbled by an employee of the inn, who reveals to the Blanchefords that they're visiting a local lord. Hunters are dispatched, accompanied by Sofia. Poynton, on hearing this, summons an antlered rider from underground. Roxy and George spy the incoming cavalry and run to warn Nell. Billy advises Nell that accepting the lord's invitation is a bad idea, but she ignores him and follows Charles inside.
| 3 | "A Private Joke With the Queen" | Amanda Brotchie | Sally Wainwright | 29 March 2024 |
As Charles and Nell needle each other over tea, Billy warns Nell that danger is coming and that they must leave. The hunters burst in along with the supernatural antlered knight, which is controlled by Poynton. Nell fights the knight and struggles, even with Billy's help. She eventually defeats him, causing Poynton severe injury. Nell escapes along with Rasselas, Roxy and George, but Charles is captured and George is shot. The group comes across an abandoned plague village in the woods and takes shelter, where Nell tends to George. The queen and her council discuss the death of Herne the Hunter, the antlered knight summoned by Poynton. By tradition, his appearance portends the death of a monarch. George develops a fever, and Nell and Rasselas head out to find a physician. Sofia visits Poynton and confirms that he was the one controlling Herne the Hunter. She expresses interest in learning about the dark arts. Nell blames herself for everything bad that has befallen her family and tries to make sense of it all with Billy. He suggests that she's been granted supernatural abilities to bring balance to the world.
| 4 | "Devil's Dung" | Amanda Brotchie | Sally Wainwright | 29 March 2024 |
Nell enlists help in a local town from an old doctor by posing as a Scottish aristocrat. Roxy finds an old text about a healing ointment, but the ingredients sound fantastical. She is guided around the cottage by some lights until she finds everything she needs to make it. She later admits to Nell that she possesses magical powers. Poynton persuades Sofia that he should move in with her and Thomas, but Thomas is against the idea and he leaves for London. Back at the village, the doctor examines George and discovers the ointment Roxy mixed helped, but he wants to perform surgery to ensure she fully recovers. In the process, he discovers Nell is a wanted outlaw and suggests that she visit his brother, a magistrate, in Oxford to secure a fair hearing. Charles, temporarily freed from Newgate prison, meets Lady Eularia, an older high-class woman. She accosts him for his misdeeds and reveals that they're engaged, but declines to help him until he tells her the truth. Poynton agrees to tutor Sophia in dark magic in order to murder Nell, if she agrees to overthrow the queen and support the Jacobite cause. They plan to back an army James Francis Edward Stuart will be bringing over from France in a few weeks. Nell goes to Oxford and relays her side of the story to the magistrate, who dies in front of her from an unknown cause, but Nell still ends up accused of murdering him.
| 5 | "Excuse Me, I'm a Doctor" | Amanda Brotchie | Sally Wainwright | 29 March 2024 |
Nell drops off George and Roxy at their uncle Jack's inn and leaves with Rasselas for London. As her abilities grow, Sofia plans on executing a complex and laborious spell to locate and trap Nell with Poynton's guidance. The spell requires a subterranean space and an object belonging to Nell - fortunately, Sofia had taken a comb with Nell's hair from the scene of the fight with Herne. Billy refuses to help Nell spring Charles from prison, as it goes against his morals to help a criminal. Rasselas asks Nell permission to court Roxy, but she refuses, saying Roxy is too young. Afterwards, Nell impersonates a doctor and infiltrates the prison. She discovers an outbreak of typhus and uses it as an excuse to visit Charles, who has become an exhibit for the nobles. He rejects her plan to get him out, counting on Lady Eularia to secure his freedom. Eularia figures out that the doctor examining Charles was actually Nell and informs the guards, who trick Nell and lock her up with child prisoners. Billy declares that their true mission is to free the children that were cruelly imprisoned for petty crimes, and he grants Nell her powers to break them out, as well as other prisoners held in squalor. Meanwhile, Sofia summons black ooze from the prison walls and ground in an attempt to hinder Nell. As the prisoners escape, Rasselas runs in to find Nell. In a final attempt, Sofia creates illusory barriers, but Nell runs through them and awakens outside, finding that Rasselas has disappeared. During the night, George is kidnapped by the traveling performer Japhia.
| 6 | "Snatched by Strollers" | MJ Delaney | Emme Hoy | 29 March 2024 |
Polly Honeycombe, a noblewoman who had been robbed by Nell, elopes with one Mr. Scribble. She fantasizes about Nell, who she believes is a man, and convinces herself that Nell is courting her. She is then kidnapped by Japhia's troupe, who believe her to be Roxy. Returning to her uncle's inn, Nell learns about the kidnappings and sets off with Roxy to save George. Poynton returns from London with Thomas, helping him overcome his patricidal guilt by gifting him an artefact of dark magic. Rasselas appears at the Blancheford estate as well. Charles is the only prisoner that remains at Newgate and his trial has been moved up. Eularia admits that she might not be able to help him. Sofia and Poynton discuss their plans, while Rasselas spies on them. Japhia attempts to force Nell to drink poison, but Billy foils his plan by switching their drinks. Nell helps one of the troupe performers give birth and afterwards Polly kisses her dramatically. Giving a rousing speech, Nell declares war on the press that has been slandering her entire family. Rasselas confronts Sofia and pleads with her to tell the truth. She replaces the cloth on his wound before he leaves and keeps the old one to use for a spell.
| 7 | "Stop Printing This Muck" | MJ Delaney | Georgia Christou | 29 March 2024 |
Nell and her group arrive in London, where she's infamous amongst the townspeople. Instead of destroying the newspaper presses, Billy suggests they use them to their advantage. The group is reunited with Rasselas as they attempt to convince Lady Eularia, who is a news magnate, that Nell is innocent, and that Sofia and Poynton are planning a coup. At his trial, Charles shifts the blame onto Nell to save himself, but his defense is thrown off course when the prosecution accuses him of being a Jacobite and he's abandoned by Eularia. When the rest of the plotters arrive to convene with Poynton, Sofia is excluded for being a woman, while Thomas, despite his lesser involvement, is welcomed into the ranks. Sofia then discovers the secret underground room used for rituals in Poynton's office and decides to take advantage of it. Eularia refuses to retract the lies she's been writing in her newspapers, so Nell threatens to destroy her printing presses. Eularia is then possessed by Sofia, using her to attack Nell. George sings a song defending Nell and shedding light on the truth, which manages to break the spell. Sofia bursts into the room where the Jacobite meeting is being held and reveals that Nell and her allies know about the planned invasion, moving up their timetable. Charles is found guilty at his trial, but escapes. Eularia finally agrees to print the truth and hires Polly as her new editor. Receiving news of the queen's relocation to the Blancheford residence at Poynton's urging, Nell and her group rush to save her.
| 8 | "Not Some Cheap Trick" | MJ Delaney | Emme Hoy | 29 March 2024 |
Billy is excited to intercept the queen during her trip, but instead they find Charles in a decoy carriage. Poynton arrests the queen upon her arrival at the Blancheford residence. When Sofia finds out about the pendant Poynton gifted Thomas, she confronts him and learns that the effects of the pendant could unlock immeasurable power, at the cost of Thomas' life. Sofia refuses to harvest the power, so Poynton does it himself, and he leaves Sofia to die as a snake coils around her body. Rasselas agrees to help Roxy find a way in to confront the dark forces she senses are operating inside. When they find Thomas, he reveals Rasselas' true name to be Amadin. Nell fights off all the guards to get to the queen, who is then revealed to be Poynton in disguise. He overpowers Nell with his newfound magic, until Roxy briefly disrupts his hold on Thomas. Meanwhile, Charles and George steal finery from the house and find where the real queen is locked up. Sofia frees herself from her bonds and joins Nell in her battle against Poynton. Charles distracts Poynton while pretending to be the queen. Nell and Sofia go to Thomas, while Roxy and Amadin escort the queen and George to safety. Billy enters Thomas and successfully fights off the effect of the pendant from the inside, but he must relinquish his bond with Nell in the process. Sofia kills Poynton with a dagger, saving Nell's life. In return, Nell allows her and Thomas to run away without interference. Later, the queen pardons Nell and her companions of all their crimes, and allows them to return to their father's inn. As the carriage takes them home, a sparkle of light follows close behind.

== Reception ==
=== Viewership ===
According to market research company Parrot Analytics, which looks at consumer engagement in consumer research, streaming, downloads, and on social media, Renegade Nell experienced a significant surge in global demand following the release of its trailer around 20 March, and peaked on 29 March with the official launch of the show on Disney+. Demand on that day reached nearly the level of the average global TV show, marking a rise of 11,346 places in its worldwide rank. Luminate, which gathers viewership data from certain smart TVs in the U.S., announced that Renegade Nell was watched for 177.5 million minutes from 29 March to 4 April. The series accounted for 3.6% of Disney+ original series viewing time in 2024.

=== Critical response ===
On the review aggregator website Rotten Tomatoes, 86% of 28 critics' reviews are positive, with an average rating of 7.7/10. The website's consensus reads: "Renegade Nell has a hero worth rooting for in Louisa Harland, and even if it curiously blurs the line between family-friendly and edgy, it makes a spunky first impression." On Metacritic, the series holds a weighted average score of 70 out of 100, based on 13 critics, indicating "generally favorable reviews".

Lucy Mangan of The Guardian rated Renegade Nell four out of five stars and praised the show for its fun, action-packed nature and Louisa Harland's performance as the titular character. She noted the series' supernatural twist, with Nell gaining superhuman abilities when in danger, which leads to thrilling set pieces. Mangan appreciated the show's lighthearted, non-serious tone, comparing it to Gentleman Jack with added swagger, and found Harland's portrayal full of confidence and charm. She acknowledged the plot's occasional chaos but felt that the energy of the cast held it together. Fiona Sturges of The Financial Times said Renegade Nell is a lively and entertaining period drama that marks a stylistic departure for Sally Wainwright from her previous crime dramas like Happy Valley. She praised Harland's charismatic performance as Nell Jackson, noting that the character is tough and not afraid to stand her ground. Sturges found the show to be fast-paced and fun, with comedic fight scenes and magical elements, such as the Tinkerbell-like figure, Billy Blind, adding a whimsical touch. She also highlighted the supporting roles from Craig Parkinson and Joely Richardson, but emphasized that the show is ultimately Harland's, as she brings charm and energy to the role.

Anita Singh in The Daily Telegraph complimented Harland's performance, highlighting her gift for physical comedy and action heroism, noting that Harland carries the whole series with ease. However, Singh found the fairy character, Billy Blind to be "hellishly annoying," especially for older viewers, despite its potential appeal to younger audiences. She found the show's supernatural elements and script leaning too much into silliness, with the fantasy aspects feeling more like a rejected Doctor Who episode as the story progressed.

=== Accolades ===
Renegade Nell was one of 200 television series that received the ReFrame Stamp for the years 2023 to 2024. The stamp is awarded by the gender equity coalition ReFrame and industry database IMDbPro for film and television projects that are proven to have gender-balanced hiring, with stamps being awarded to projects that hire female-identifying people, especially women of color, in four out of eight key roles for their production.

| Year | Award | Category | Nominee(s) | Result | Ref. |
|---|---|---|---|---|---|
| 2024 | Family Film and TV Awards | Outstanding Actor in a TV Series | Louisa Harland | Nominated | |
| 2024 | Music+Sound Award | Best Original Composition in a Television Program | Nick Foster, Oli Julian | Won | |
| 2024 | TCA Awards | Outstanding Achievement in Family Programming | Renegade Nell | Nominated | |
