= Amadeus (TV series) =

British television series

- Promotional poster
- Genre: Historical drama
- Based on: Amadeus by Peter Shaffer
- Written by: Joe Barton
- Directed by: Julian Farino; Alice Seabright
- Starring: Will Sharpe; Paul Bettany; Gabrielle Creevy; Jessica Alexander; Jonathan Aris; Olivia-Mai Barrett; Lucy Cohu; Nancy Farino; Anastasia Martin; Ényì Okoronkwo; Rory Kinnear; Jyuddah Jaymes; Jack Farthing
- Composer: Bryce Dessner
- Country of origin: United Kingdom
- Original language: English
- No. of series: 1
- No. of episodes: 5

Production
- Executive producers: Will Sharpe; Paul Bettany; Rupert Lord; Megan Spanjian; Julian Farino; Joe Barton; John Griffin; Stephen Wright; Michael Jackson
- Producers: John Griffin; Christien Bart-Gittens
- Running time: 43–53 minutes
- Production companies: Two Cities Television; Sky Studios

Original release
- Network: Sky Atlantic
- Release: 21 December – 25 December 2025

Amadeus is a 2025 British historical drama television miniseries adapted by Joe Barton from the 1979 stage play by Peter Shaffer. It gives a fictionalised account of the lives of composers Wolfgang Amadeus Mozart and Antonio Salieri, portrayed by Will Sharpe and Paul Bettany respectively, with Gabrielle Creevy portraying Mozart's wife, Constanze. It is the second screen adaptation of the play, following the 1984 film. Amadeus premiered on 21 December 2025 on Sky Atlantic.

== Premise ==
A 25-year-old Wolfgang Amadeus Mozart arrives in Vienna, Austria, during the 18th century and meets a young singer who will become his wife (Constanze Mozart) and by way of her, the court composer Antonio Salieri.

== Cast and characters ==
=== Main ===
- Will Sharpe as Wolfgang Amadeus Mozart
- Paul Bettany as Antonio Salieri
- Gabrielle Creevy as Constanze Mozart
- Jessica Alexander as Katerina
- Jonathan Aris as Leopold Mozart
- Olivia-Mai Barrett as Sophie Weber
- Lucy Cohu as Cecilia Weber
- Nancy Farino as Josepha Weber
- Anastasia Martin as Aloysia Weber
- Ényì Okoronkwo as Lorenzo Da Ponte
- Rory Kinnear as Emperor Joseph
- Jyuddah Jaymes as Franz Xaver Süssmayr
- Jack Farthing as Alexander Pushkin

=== Supporting ===
- Paul Bazely as Gottfried van Swieten
- Hugh Sachs as Von Strack
- Rupert Vansittart as Rosenberg
- Viola Prettejohn as Princess Elizabeth

== Production ==
The project was reported to be in development in November 2022 with Two Cities Television and screenwriter Joe Barton.

It was announced to be moving forward in February 2024, with Julian Farino and Alice Seabright directing from a Joe Barton script with Will Sharpe in the role of Wolfgang Amadeus Mozart. In April, Paul Bettany and Gabrielle Creevy joined the cast as Antonio Salieri and Constanze Mozart respectively. In late May, it was announced Rory Kinnear, Lucy Cohu, Jonathan Aris, Enyi Okoronkwo, Jessica Alexander and Hugh Sachs had been cast. Also cast in undisclosed roles were Paul Bazely, Rupert Vansittart, Anastasia Martin, Nancy Farino, Olivia-Mai Barrett, Viola Prettejohn, and Jyuddah James.

Filming took place in Budapest, Hungary, between May and September 2024.

== Episodes ==
No. in series	Title	Directed by	Written by	Original release date
1	"Episode 1"	Julian Farino	Joe Barton	21 December 2025
2	"Episode 2"	Julian Farino	Joe Barton	22 December 2025
3	"Episode 3"	Julian Farino	Joe Barton	23 December 2025
4	"Episode 4"	Alice Seabright	Joe Barton	24 December 2025
5	"Episode 5"	Alice Seabright	Joe Barton	25 December 2025

== Release ==
The five-episode series premiered on 21 December 2025 on Sky Atlantic. The series premiered on 8 May 2026 on Starz in the United States.

== Reception ==
On the review aggregator website Rotten Tomatoes, 88% of 16 critics' reviews are positive. The website's consensus reads: "Amadeus scales historical drama highs through sensational storytelling and divine performances by Will Sharpe and Paul Bettany." Some published reviews were positive; Pippa Bailey wrote for The New Statesman that the series was "sumptuous, highly enjoyable television".

Writing for The Critic, Australian composer Alexander Voltz viewed the series less favourably, questioning its screenplay, casting and original score, and describing it as "without authentic intention". Lucy Mangan, for The Guardian, was equally critical, awarding the series two stars, stating "this Mozart series is a pale, petty version of the movie it's based on".

The series won for Make Up & Hair Design at the British Academy Television Craft Awards.
