= Bad Day for the Cut =

2017 film

- Film poster
- Directed by: Chris Baugh
- Starring: Nigel O'Neill; Susan Lynch
- Cinematography: Ryan Kernaghan
- Edited by: Brian Philip Davis
- Music by: James Everett
- Release date: 22 January 2017 (SFF)
- Running time: 99 minutes
- Country: Northern Ireland
- Language: English

Bad Day for the Cut is a 2017 Northern Irish crime thriller film directed by Chris Baugh. It follows a mild-mannered farmer who sets out to seek revenge after the death of his elderly mother.

== Plot ==
Donal is a middle-aged, mild mannered Irish farmer living with his mother on a farm. One night, he wakes up from a dream to find his mother has been killed, and he witnesses the killer drive away. A few days later, he is set upon by two men who attempt to kill him, but he kills one of them instead. He discovers that the second man, Bartosz, was participating under duress, as his sister Kaja was being forced into prostitution and he had been caught trying to find her, and the two of them decide to team up to rescue Kaja and exact revenge on the persons responsible.

Bartosz goes to see Gavigan and Jerome, the two men who sent him to kill Donal, and witnesses Gavigan kill a prostitute. Donal manages to lock Jerome into a closet as he moves the corpse, and they kidnap Gavigan. Driving out to a forest in his recreational vehicle (RV), Donal tortures Gavigan and learns of his bosses, Frankie and Trevor. Gavigan is able to escape the RV, free himself of his bonds, and report to Frankie that Donal is still alive before Donal and Bartosz find him. During a struggle, Bartosz kills Gavigan. Donal wants to go after Frankie, but Bartosz convinces him to get Kaja first because she knows where Frankie lives.

Posing as a customer, Donal arranges to meet with Kaja in an apartment. He persuades her to trust him and knocks out her guard, but when it turns out that Kaja knows nothing about Frankie, Donal returns to torture the guard to get the information he needs. As they are about to leave, they run into Jerome, who has come to collect Kaja. Jerome overpowers Donal but drops his gun during the fight which Kaja then uses to kill Jerome.

Donal, Bartosz, and Kaja go to the address they were given, whereupon they find and follow Trevor to Frankie's house. Donal sees that Frankie has a young daughter and the trio decide to come back at night, when the child will be asleep. However, seeing the girl causes Bartosz and Kaja to have a change of heart, so Donal sends them off with their passports and travel money, and continues on by himself. Meeting with his uncle Eamon, he discovers not only that Frankie's father Joe was a gangster, but also that his mother had had an affair with Joe many years ago, and had been with Joe when he was killed by a rival. While Donal is away, Frankie and a henchman kill Eamon and wait for Donal to come back, but Donal is able to capture Frankie instead.

He takes her to the beach where Joe had been killed. As he forces her to kneel in front of a grave he has dug for her, Frankie admits that she was the one who killed his mother, but she also reveals that his mother had killed her father because he was planning on leaving her. In addition, Frankie tells him that if he kills her, he would be orphaning a young girl just as she herself had been orphaned when her father died. Hearing this, Donal decides to spare her life. However, as he walks away, she attacks him with a shovel and races back to the RV to grab her gun, but Donal shoots her before she can use it on him. Meanwhile, Bartosz has gone back to try and help but is caught by Trevor, and is shot to death while Donal listens on the phone.

== Cast ==
- Nigel O'Neill as Donal
- Susan Lynch as Frankie Pierce
- Józef Pawłowski as Bartosz
- Stuart Graham as Trevor Ballantine
- David Pearse as Gavigan
- Anna Próchniak as Kaja
- Brian Milligan as Jerome
- Ian McElhinney as Eamon

== Reception ==
The movie got a rating of 92% on Rotten Tomatoes, based on 12 reviews.
