= The Devil's Doorway =

- Directed by: Aislinn Clarke
- Written by: Martin Brennan; Aislinn Clarke; Michael B. Jackson
- Produced by: Martin Brennan; Katy Jackson; Michael B. Jackson
- Starring: Lalor Roddy; Ciaran Flynn; Helena Bereen
- Cinematography: Ryan Kernaghan
- Edited by: Brian Philip Davis
- Music by: Andrew Simon McAllister
- Production company: 23ten
- Distributed by: Content Media (United Kingdom); IFC Films (United States); Kew Media Group (international)
- Release dates: 25 May 2018 (SIFF); 13 July 2018 (United States); 25 August 2018 (FrightFest)
- Running time: 76 minutes
- Countries: Ireland; United Kingdom
- Language: English
- Box office: US$516,660

The Devil's Doorway is a 2018 found footage supernatural horror film directed by Aislinn Clarke, co-written by Clarke, Martin Brennan, and Michael B. Jackson, and starring Lalor Roddy, Ciaran Flynn, and Helena Bereen. Set in 1960 Ireland, the film follows two priests who uncover sinister occurrences in the Magdalene Laundries while investigating an alleged bleeding statue of the Virgin Mary.

The film had its world premiere at the 44th Seattle International Film Festival on 25 May 2018. IFC Midnight released the film in the United States on 13 July 2018.

== Plot ==
In October 1960, a Vatican bishop sent two priests to a Magdalene Asylum in Ireland in response to a letter claiming a statue of the Virgin Mary in the asylum chapel bled from the eyes. Of the two, Father Thomas Riley is the older and jaded miracle investigator who has seen too many frauds, while the younger Father John Thornton is enthusiastic about the assignment, and believes they will find a genuine miracle.

Initially, the asylum's authoritarian Mother Superior tries to discredit the letter (sent anonymously from her hospice) by reminding the priests that "they are not all good girls in this home." She makes it clear the priests are not welcome, treats them grudgingly, and installs them in separate accommodations.

Father John sets up his (16 mm cameras) in the chapel, pointed at the statue. As the blood has dried up, Father Thomas cannot sample and analyse it, so they will have to wait for another occurrence. Meanwhile, Father John interviews some of the women in the asylum, and soon discovers they have no access to the chapel and are subjected to cruel punishments to ensure discipline. They are also exploited for labour, responsible for both keeping the asylum clean and running the local laundry business. The abuse is discussed with the Reverend Mother. Despite being unhappy that the priests have to document all their activities and conversations, she defiantly stands her ground, claiming her role is to "clean up" many other Churches' dirty secrets, including babies whose fathers are fathers.

For two nights, Father John is awakened at 3 a.m. by strange sounds and apparent visions of children playing in the hallways. He informs Thomas, who denies hearing anything. They ascertain that there are no children in the asylum; the children's wing has been closed since the war. Father Thomas is convinced that a con man is behind these strange occurrences. However, on the third day, all the statues of the Virgin Mary in the asylum bleed at the same time. A brief analyses reveals that the samples are of type O-negative, and come from a pregnant woman. Father Thomas compares the samples with the blood of the inmates and the nuns, but finds no match.

A nun privately admitted that she was the one sending the anonymous letter. She informs Father Thomas of a young pregnant woman named Kathleen O'Brien being held in a secret room in the basement, and recites the Matthew 5:29 verse, "If your eye makes you sin, pluck it out and throw it away".

Despite the Mother Superior's stern objections, Father Thomas insists on seeing Kathleen. She is emaciated, scarred and chained in a filthy room. A local doctor confirms that the girl is a virgin but is also pregnant. Attempts to move Kathleen beyond her room result in violent attacks and manifestations of apparent demonic possession. Father Thomas interviews Kathleen, who claims to be possessed by an unknown entity.

After a series of supernatural phenomena, the two priests discover a room with evidence of satanic cult activities, including a Black Mass. Father Thomas reveals to Father John that he was an orphan, and speculates he may have been born in this asylum. Kathleen cryptically implies that babies were killed in the asylum. Kathleen goes into labor and dies in childbirth.

More supernatural phenomena ensues, and the two priests find a nun murdered, her eyes gouged out. Then get to a network of tunnels containing skeletons of small children. The two become disoriented and are separated when a nun attacks them. Father John is killed by the nun.

After taping a confessional, Father Thomas finds a satanic altar. A group of nuns who form a coven and are performing a ritual. A possessed Mother Superior says, "Welcome home, Thomas" and suddenly attacks him. After Father Thomas falls, Mother Superior is heard shushing a crying baby.

== Cast ==
- Lalor Roddy as Father Thomas Riley
- Ciaran Flynn as Father John Thornton
- Helena Bereen as Mother Superior
- Lauren Coe as Kathleen O’Brien
- Dearbhail Lynch as Eileen Murphy
- Carleen Melaugh as Sister Maria Louise

== Production ==
=== Development ===
Clarke stated in an interview that she was wanted to publicise the horrors of the Magdalene Laundries in Ireland, saying: "I had my son when I was 17, which was the year after the last Magdalene Laundry closed. People think these places existed a very long time ago, but that was 1997; the last one had closed in 1996. I was 17 and unmarried, I could have been in one if the circumstances has been different". She stated that Magdalence laundries where women were essentially worked as slave labour for the Catholic Church were not an aberration in Irish life, saying: "Everyone knew. So you had nowhere to turn. Every person was complicit in a way, because everybody knew that they were there and what was happening. So girls could be plucked out of schools and sent to these places. That was the direct result of the Catholic Church apparatus, which created a situation where vulnerable people could be exploited for so long".

In another interview, Clarke stated: "The Magdalene laundries are only one aspect of the terrible things that happened in Irish Catholic society. They were symptoms of the church/state apparatus, the combination of the two things created the mechanism. That's part of what the film is about for me: even if Lalor [Roddy] as Father Thomas wants to be a good priest and a good man, and that's what he wants to be, that's impossible within this system and within this society. It's the same with the nuns. Not all the nuns are bad – there is the good nun who sends the letter out, and she does want to do right by her faith – but everyone becomes a cog in the greater mechanism, and no one person can really make any huge changes."

=== Casting ===
Clarke, who lives in Northern Ireland and is active in the theater, recruited most of the actors from her own work in the theater. About the casting of Roddy in the lead role, Clarke said: "Lalor, who plays the lead Father Thomas, is the only one who didn't come through the process. We had been looking to cast a little younger, but, somehow, the script had fallen into his hands and he just got in touch and asked to read for it, having seen the script somewhere. I invited him to my office, he auditioned there and then and he was Father Thomas. Lalor had lived through all the social upheaval in Ireland through the sixties and seventies and was full of the righteous anger that the project needed. Like Helena, he was just perfect off the bat".

=== Filming ===
About the filming, Clarke stated: "The whole experience was different. I'd made shorts before and I've worked in theatre a lot, but making a feature is different. We had about 16 days to shoot, on a tiny budget, very little lead-in or development time – we just had to do it. The sort of all-encompassing focus that helps you work through so many consecutive hours, with little-to-no sleep, and leading a team of a dozens of people is an intense feeling. But I learned that this is where I thrive. In fact, I learned that the set is my favorite place to be and I can't wait to get on to the next one". She was stated that expensive productions like Game of Thrones that had been filmed in Ulster had vastly improved the technical skills of film crews in Northern Ireland, making it possible despite the film's low budget to bring in a very polished and professional production. Roddy himself appeared in the first season of Game of Thrones in the second episode The Kingsroad as the assassin who tries to kill Bran Stark.

== Release ==
The film had its world premiere at the 44th Seattle International Film Festival on 25 May 2018 before being distributed theatrically in the United States by IFC Midnight on 13 July 2018. It later screened at FrightFest in London on 25 August 2018.

=== Home media ===
Scream Factory released The Devil's Doorway on DVD and Blu-ray in the United States on 23 October 2018. The DVD and Blu-ray sales earned a combined $50,544 in sales. In November 2026, Shudder reissued the film in Blu-ray format.

== Reception ==
=== Box office ===
The Devil's Doorway earned $516,660 worldwide.

=== Critical response ===
On the review aggregator website Rotten Tomatoes, 68% of 25 critics' reviews are positive.

Jacob Knight of Birth.Movies.Death. gave the film a favorable review, calling it "pretty damn good" and especially praised Clarke's direction, which he called very skillful. Anya Stanley, also writing for Birth.Movies.Death, wrote in her review: "What sets The Devil's Doorway apart is its indictment of systematic Church atrocities, of the sins of a nation's past coming back to torment them, personified in the violated body of an innocent girl and her unborn, unwanted child. Sure, it gets tiresome to see the crosses flip upside down and the body contortion, right on cue. But the grand socio-political designs embroidered into these cinematic banalities makes their usage ultimately forgivable and interesting." Stanley praised Clarke for her "sense of craft" and her focus on what the characters can hear instead of what they can see.

Eva Tushnet in the Jesuit journal America praised the film's atmosphere, writing: "What is so awful about a place like this one is its institutional power, its inescapable control of every vista, the sheer weight it brings to bear on the girls caught within it." Tushnet concluded her review: "Toward the end of the film, we see several people receive last rites. In a way this entire film, made by a woman raised Catholic but no longer a believer, is an attempt to give blessing and burial to the real women who died without acknowledgment of their suffering." Screen Daily's Fionnuala Halligan praised Clarke's direction in her feature film debut together with the acting, which she argued compensated for the film's low budget. Halligan wrote that the film's settling against the background of the real horrors of the Magdalene laundries gave it a vividness and a sadness that it otherwise would have lacked.

David Prendeville of Film Ireland praised the film, writing: "The decision to shoot on 16mm film rather than replicating the era digitally creates an evocative and eerie aesthetic, as well as adding a further layer of authenticity to the picture...Smart in both form and content, this is an innovative, effective and necessary Irish horror film. It marks Clarke out as a distinctive talent to watch." Patrick Bromley wrote: "...it was hard to shake the feeling that the movie plays like a collection of Horror's Greatest Hits. Found footage? Check. Demonic possession? Check. Creepy nuns? Check. Children's laughter? Check. Loud noises? Check. That it's packaged all up in a single film couldn't quite outweigh the fact that it's all been done before. But here's the thing: it's all done very well. If you are someone who likes the found footage aesthetic and/or is creeped out by religious horror, there's a very strong chance that The Devil's Doorway will play like gangbusters."

By contrast, Noel Murray of the Los Angeles Times argued that the film through innovative in some respects and well acted was heavily clichéd and ultimately unimaginative. Frank Scheck wrote: "The well documented infamies of Ireland's Magdalene Laundries would seem to hold diabolically effective potential for a horror film. Unfortunately, the best that director Aislinn Clarke can do is this derivative found-footage chiller". Jeannette Catsoulis wrote a negative review in The New York Times: "Wielding mostly 16-millimeter film, the director of photography, Ryan Kernaghan, mimics the home movies of the time with flickering ellipses and flares of dazzling, burned-out white. Some of his images, like one of sweating young women scrubbing sheets in a haze of boiling steam, are quite beautiful. Yet despite its brief running time, the movie feels dragged out; like the priests, it will eventually lose its way."
