= Ben Caplan (actor) =

British actor (born 1974)

- Born: 25 September 1974 (age 51); Hammersmith, London, England
- Education: Royal Central School of Speech and Drama
- Occupation: Actor
- Notable work: Call the Midwife
- Children: 2

Ben Caplan (born 25 September 1974) is a British actor and director, best known for portraying Police Constable (later Sergeant) Peter Noakes in the BBC One medical period drama series Call the Midwife.

== Career ==
Caplan trained at the Royal Central School of Speech and Drama and since leaving has appeared in many award-winning projects on stage and screen including the Olivier Award winning Kink's Musical Sunny Afternoon in Harold Pinter Theatre and Mike Leigh's Two Thousand Years at the National Theatre as well as working at the Royal Court Theatre and the Royal Shakespeare Company. His many screen appearances include playing PC Noakes in the BBC/PBS period drama Call The Midwife, Walter 'Smokey' Gordon in the multi award-winning HBO World War Drama Band of Brothers and the BAFTA award winning The Lost Honour of Christopher Jefferies.

== Filmography ==
=== Film ===
Year	Title	Role	Notes
2009	Driver		Official selection for the London Film Festival 2009
2012	That Woman	Danny	Short film, The 16th UK Jewish Film Festival
2020	Caveat	Moe Barret	

=== Television ===
Year	Title	Role	Notes
2001	Band Of Brothers	Corporal Walter 'Smokey' Gordon	Recurring cast; HBO war drama miniseries
2007	Maxwell	Kevin Maxwell	BBC Two TV drama
2011	The Runaway	DC Hargreaves	(2 episodes) Sky One
2012–2017	Call the Midwife	Police Constable (later Sergeant) Peter Noakes	Main cast (series 1–6); BBC One period-drama series
2024	The Ink Black Heart	Allan Yeoman	BBC One TV series
2021–	Lagging	Joshua (Series 1–3)	CBBC TV series

=== Stage ===
Year	Title	Role	Venue
2005	Two Thousand Years	Josh	Royal National Theatre
2014	Sunny Afternoon	Eddie Kassner	Hampstead Theatre, later transferring to the West End's Harold Pinter Theatre
2021	The Winter's Tale	Camillo	the Royal Shakespeare Company, aired on BBC4
