= The Walsh Sisters =

Irish television series

- Genre: Comedy drama
- Based on: The Walsh Sisters series by Marian Keyes
- Screenplay by: Stefanie Preissner; Kefi Chadwick
- Directed by: Ian FitzGibbon
- Starring: Louisa Harland; Caroline Menton; Danielle Galligan; Máiréad Tyers; Stefanie Preissner; Carrie Crowley; Jay Duffy; Samuel Anderson; Aidan Quinn; Debi Mazar; Gina Moxley
- Country of origin: Ireland
- Original language: English

Production
- Executive producers: Marian Keyes; Stefanie Preissner; Tony Baines; David Crean; Dermot Horan; Dixie Linder; Nick Marston; David McLoughlin; James Durie; Tom Misselbrook
- Producer: Patrick O'Donoghue
- Production companies: Cuba Pictures; Metropolitan Pictures

Original release
- Network: RTÉ One
- Release: 28 September 2025 – present

The Walsh Sisters is an Irish comedy drama television series adapted from the works of Marian Keyes by Stefanie Preissner and Kefi Chadwick. Priessner also portrays one of the Walsh sisters alongside Danielle Galligan, Louisa Harland, Caroline Menton, and Máiréad Tyers. The series premiered on 28 September 2025 on RTÉ One. In September 2026, the series was renewed for a second season.

== Cast and characters ==
- Louisa Harland as Anna
- Caroline Menton as Rachel
- Danielle Galligan as Claire
- Máiréad Tyers as Helen
- Stefanie Preissner as Maggie
- Carrie Crowley as Mammy Walsh
- Jay Duffy as Luke Costello
- Samuel Anderson as Aidan
- Aidan Quinn as Jack 'Daddy' Walsh
- Debi Mazar as Chaquie
- Gina Moxley as Josephine

== Production ==
The series was commissioned by RTÉ in late 2024. Stefanie Preissner and Kefi Chadwick adapted Marian Keyes's books Rachel's Holiday and Anybody Out There for the series. Preissner is also one of the five Walsh sisters in the cast, along with Danielle Galligan, Louisa Harland, Caroline Menton, and Máiréad Tyers. Aidan Quinn and Carrie Crowley are cast as their parents.

The series is directed by Ian FitzGibbon and produced by Cuba Pictures and Metropolitan Pictures, with Patrick O'Donoghue as producer. Executive producers include David Crean, Dermot Horan, Dixie Linder, Nick Marston, David McLoughlin, James Durie, Tom Misselbrook, Preissner, Keyes and Tony Baines.

Principal photography commenced in Ireland in the spring of 2025 and was completed by April 2025 with filming locations including Dublin.

In September 2026, the series was renewed for a second season.

== Broadcast ==
In Ireland, the series aired on RTÉ One and RTÉ Player on 28 September 2025. In the UK, it aired on BBC One and BBC iPlayer on 21 February 2026.

== Reception ==
In January 2026, the series was nominated at the Irish Film & Television Awards for best drama, with Stefanie Preissner nominated for best script, Louisa Harland nominated for best actress, and Aidan Quinn nominated for best supporting actor. In April 2026, the series won the Audience Choice Award and was nominated at the Royal Television Society Republic of Ireland Awards in the scripted category.
