= The Day (2026 TV series) =

British television series

- Genre: Heist; Crime thriller
- Based on: De Dag by: Julie Mahieu; Jonas Geirnaert
- Screenplay by: Ben Harris; Jesse O'Mahoney
- Directed by: Andy Tohill; Ryan Tohill
- Starring: Minnie Driver; Luca Pasqualino; Louisa Harland
- Country of origin: United Kingdom
- Original language: English

Production
- Executive producers: Mike Benson; Andy Morgan; Daniel March; Tamryn Reinecke
- Production companies: Dynamic Television; Clapperboard Studios

Original release
- Network: Paramount+

The Day is an upcoming British crime thriller television series about a hostage negotiator called-in when a bank heist is interrupted by police. It is starring Minnie Driver, Louisa Harland and Luca Pasqualino. It is set to be released on Paramount+ on 31 December 2026.

== Premise ==
Set over a single day, a police hostage negotiator is called-in following a siege from a bank robbery gone wrong.

== Cast ==
- Minnie Driver as Sylvia ‘Vox’ Voxley
- Luca Pasqualino as Luke
- Louisa Harland as Freya
- Charlie De Melo as Liam

== Production ==
The series was commissioned by Paramount+ and is adapted from the Belgian series De Dag (2018) created by Julie Mahieu and Jonas Geirnaert.

It was developed and co-produced by Dynamic Television and Clapperboard Studios and written by Ben Harris and Jesse O'Mahoney. Mike Benson and Andy Morgan are executive producers alongside Daniel March and Tamryn Reinecke. Jake Rollins is the series producer with Andy Tohill and Ryan Tohill as co-directors.

The cast is led by Minnie Driver, Luca Pasqualino and Louisa Harland, as well as Charlie De Melo. Filming was underway in April 2026.

== Release ==
The series is scheduled to have four episodes released on 31 December 2026 with the following four episodes released on 7 January 2027 on Paramount+.
