= Tadhg Murphy (actor) =

Irish actor (born 1979)

- Born: 30 May 1979 (age 47); Dublin, Ireland
- Occupation: Actor
- Years active: 2004–present

Tadhg Murphy (born 30 May 1979) is an Irish actor known for his roles in the series Vikings and Black Sails. He is distinguished by his artificial right eye, having lost his eye in an accident while playing with a bow at the age of 13. Murphy has incorporated his disability in several of his acting roles.

== Filmography ==
=== Film ===
Year	Title	Role	Notes
2004	Alexander	Dying Soldier	
2005	Boy Eats Girl	Diggs	
2021	Wrath of Man	Shirley	
2022	The Northman	Eirikr Blaze-Eye	
2023	Apocalypse Clown	Tim from Bromanz	
2024	Oddity	Olin Boole	

=== Television ===
Year	Title	Role	Notes
2010	An Crisis	Liam	1 episode
2010	1916 Seachtar na Cásca	Patrick Pearse	Main cast
2013–2014	Vikings	Arne	Recurring role (season 1), guest episode (season 2)
2015	Black Sails	Ned Low	Recurring role (season 2)
2017	Will	Baxter	Recurring role
2020	Miss Scarlet and the Duke	Jim Thief	1 episode
2020	Absentia	Kristophe	3 episodes
2019–2023	Brassic	Gary Cullen	Recurring role (series 1–5)
2022	Conversations with Friends	Derek	Recurring role
2022	The English	Tap O'Neil	2 episodes
2024	Shardlake	Justice Copynger	Main cast
2024	Time Bandits	Alto	Main cast
