= My Foolish Heart (2018 film) =

- Film poster
- Directed by: Rolf van Eijk
- Starring: Steve Wall
- Release date: September 2018 (Netherlands Film Festival)
- Country: Netherlands
- Language: Dutch

My Foolish Heart is a 2018 Dutch biographical film by Rolf van Eijk. It follows a police detective in Amsterdam who tries to reconstruct the final days of Chet Baker before his death on 13 May 1988. The film was Van Eijk's feature film directorial debut.

My Foolish Heart premiered at the 2018 Netherlands Film Festival.

== Plot ==
Amsterdam 1988. Police detective Lucas tries to reconstruct the events that lead to the death of jazz musician Chet Baker. He meets with his final lover Sarah, loyal friend Simon and strange admirer Doctor Feelgood. He learns about Baker's tragic life as a problematic heroin user and lonely soul. While he conducts his investigation Lucas is confronted with his own darker side.

== Cast ==
- Steve Wall – Chet Baker
- Gijs Naber – Lucas
- Lynsey Beauchamp – Sarah
- Arjan Ederveen- Doctor Feelgood
- Raymond Thiry – Simon
- Paloma Aguilera Valdebenito
- Antony Acheampong
- Medina Schuurman
- Horace Cohen

== See also ==
- Born to be Blue, also about Chet Baker's final days.
