= Departure (TV series) =

2019 suspense drama television series

- Genre: Drama; Suspense; Thriller
- Created by: Vince Shiao
- Written by: Vince Shiao; Malcolm MacRury; John Krizanc; Ellen Vanstone; Stephanie Tracey
- Directed by: T. J. Scott
- Starring: Archie Panjabi; Christopher Plummer; Kris Holden-Ried; Florence Ordesh; Rebecca Liddiard; Tamara Duarte; Mark Rendall; Peter Mensah; Claire Forlani
- Composer: Keith Power
- Country of origin: Canada
- Original language: English
- No. of seasons: 3
- No. of episodes: 18

Production
- Executive producers: Patrick Cassavetti; Carlo Dusi; Scott Garvie; D. Matt Geller; Diane Hendricks; Christina Jennings; Karine Martin; Archie Panjabi; Chris Philip; T. J. Scott; Ben Silverman; Bo Stehmeier; Jeff Stentz; David A. Stern; Malcolm MacRury
- Producers: Julie Lacey; Tina Grewal
- Cinematography: Craig Wright
- Editors: Vesna Svilanovic; Paul Winestock
- Running time: 45 minutes
- Production companies: Shaftesbury Films; Greenpoint Productions; Corus Entertainment

Original release
- Network: Global
- Release: 8 October 2020 – 11 September 2023

Departure is a Canadian suspense drama television series created by Vince Shiao. It was commissioned by the Canadian broadcaster Global and the American streaming service Peacock, being produced by Shaftesbury Films, Greenpoint Productions and Corus Entertainment. Starring Archie Panjabi and Christopher Plummer and directed by T. J. Scott, the series premiered on Universal TV in the United Kingdom on 10 July 2019, with Global scheduling the Canadian debut for 8 October 2020. During the first season's release in Canada and the UK, the series averaged more than one million viewers per episode.

In 2021 the series was renewed for a third season. That year, the series was nominated for a Canadian Screen Award for Best Dramatic Series.

== Cast ==
=== Main ===
- Archie Panjabi as Kendra Malley: the lead Transport Safety and Investigations Bureau (TSIB) investigator
- Kris Holden-Ried as Dominic Hayes: a TSIB investigator
- Mark Rendall as Theo Barker: a TSIB investigator
- Christopher Plummer as Howard Lawson: the senior manager of the TSIB and Kendra's mentor (season 1, recurring role season 2)

=== Season 1 ===
- Peter Mensah as Levi Hall: a senior TSIB investigator
- Sasha Roiz as Pavel Bartok: Russian oligarch and the CEO of Bartok Airways
- Rebecca Liddiard as Madelyn Strong: the sole survivor of British Global Air (BGA) Flight 716
- Shazad Latif as Ali Basra: Madelyn Strong's boyfriend
- Tamara Duarte as Nadia: a TSIB investigator
- Alexandre Bourgeois as AJ Malley: Kendra's bitter, criminal, adopted son
- Kristian Bruun as Daniel Hoffman: a passenger on BGA 716
- Evan Buliung as Derek Strong: Madelyn Strong's father
- Allan Hawco as Richard Donovan: pilot of BGA 716
- Claire Forlani as Janet Friel: an MI5 officer assigned to the investigation
- Dougray Scott as Ethan Moreau: the CEO of British Global Air

=== Season 2 ===
- Karen LeBlanc as Ellen Hunter
- Jason O'Mara as Max O'Neill
- David Hewlett as Bill Ratch
- Dion Johnstone as Jordan Cole
- Kelly McCormack as Charlotte
- Etienne Kellici as Lucas
- Charlie Carrick as Richard Bright
- Wendy Crewson as Diana Bright
- Donal Logue as Sheriff McCullough
- Florence Ordesh as Rose Tate

=== Season 3 ===
- Patrick Sabongui as Shakir Urgessa
- Savonna Spracklin as Annie Sullivan
- Mikaela Dyke as Terry-Lynn Crawford
- Brit MacRae as Jessica Hicks
- Cihang Ma as Michelle
- Tyler Elliott Burke as Arlo Shank
- Eric McCormack as Cole Banks
- Pamela Estrada as Lily
- Ben Carlson as Jack Bazin

== Production ==
=== First season ===
Location filming took place in several cities of Ontario, including Cambridge, Hamilton, and Toronto, in 2018. In Cambridge, the city hall was used to represent Scotland Yard and Cambridge University. In January 2019, filming shifted to London in the United Kingdom. Principal photography was completed in 40 days.

=== Second season ===
Departure was renewed for a second season on 11 September 2020. Production was already underway by 20 September 2020.

Christopher Plummer filmed his scenes from his home in Connecticut instead of traveling to the sets in Toronto due to travel restrictions into Canada owing to the COVID-19 pandemic. Plummer had completed filming his scenes for the second season shortly before he died on 5 February 2021. Plummer's work in the second season was his final on-screen performance before his death.

=== Third season ===
Location filming took place mostly in St. John's, Newfoundland and Labrador, and in Toronto. Weather was cited as a huge element in the story since the season revolved around a ferryboat dealing with "big waves and lots of water and rain".

Streaming was moved from Peacock to the Canadian network Global in May 2021.

== Episodes ==
=== Series overview ===
Series	Episodes	Originally released	
Series	Episodes	First released	Last released
1	6	8 October 2020	12 November 2020
2	6	13 July 2022	17 August 2022
3	6	7 August 2023	11 September 2023

=== Season 1 (2020) ===
This season follows the investigation by the fictional Transport Safety and Investigations Bureau into the disappearance of a British passenger plane over the Atlantic Ocean and the reasons behind it.

No. overall	No. in season	Title	Directed by	Written by	Original Canadian air date	UK air date	Prod. code	Canadian viewers (millions)
1	1	"Vanished"	T.J. Scott	Vince Shaio	8 October 2020	10 July 2019	354600-1	1.17
At Kennedy Airport in New York City, Madelyn Strong, returning to her fiance, Ali, in London, misses her scheduled flight and instead boards British Global Air Flight (BGA) 716. In charge of the flight, Captain Donovan appears distracted; he locks the First Officer out of the cockpit and appears to take control of the aircraft with the intent of crashing it. BGA 716 suffers an explosive decompression, with the First Officer, flight attendant and Madelyn apparently ejected in flight. The aircraft disappears over the Atlantic Ocean and Kendra Malley, on leave from the TSIB after an accident which killed her husband, is recalled to lead the investigation and find the aircraft before any survivors succumb to hypothermia. She is partnered with Dominic Hayes, a former police officer, who immediately suspects a terrorist link to the disappearance. In the course of the investigation, Dom discovers Donovan was leading a double life. Using pings from the aircraft ACARS system, Kendra narrows down the search area, which allows search teams to locate a single survivor – Madelyn.
2	2	"Survivor"	T.J. Scott	Malcolm MacRury	15 October 2020	17 July 2019	354600-2	1.27
Madelyn is recovered from the crash site and rushed into surgery, with injuries that include a possible concussion. Donovan's husband is questioned; he very recently learned of Donovan's wife, but chose to accept that he loved them both. Dominic questions Ali over his previous arrest at a protest at the Syrian Embassy, and over a package addressed to him that Madelyn received at the airport before departure; the package is actually a gift from Madelyn. Kendra attempts to question Madelyn after she awakens but triggers a seizure. AJ struggles with the death of his father Gavin, convinced that the car accident which killed him occurred under suspicious circumstances – including Kendra's survival and Bartok's possible involvement. Mossad agents contact Kendra and Dominic, revealing that Esmaili was not a terrorist, but a retired double agent. The black boxes from BGA 716 are located and the British Navy attempts to recover them using a submersible, but the sub dives below crush depth and implodes, killing the pilot; AJ watches via a trojan he illegally implanted on Kendra's work laptop. Madelyn awakens, confused and disoriented, mumbling a cryptic phrase to Dominic before losing consciousness again.
3	3	"Prime Suspect"	T.J. Scott	John Krizanc & Ellen Vanstone	22 October 2020	24 July 2019	354600-3	1.29
While regaining consciousness, Madelyn struggles to make sense of the events preceding the crash. A former colleague of Donovan's comes forward, claiming the night before the crash, whilst intoxicated, Donovan was distressed and pondered if it would be better "if he just disappeared". Janet, overriding Kendra, searches Donovan's house and uncovers a key to a storage locker, which is found to contain a flight simulator pre-programmed with a virtual reconstruction of the crash. Esmaili's DNA sample is provided by the Mossad; it does not match the blood recovered from Madelyn's raft. Police are hunting for AJ after security cameras catch him trespassing at an airport to vandalize Bartok's private jet. Continuing to spy on Kendra through her computer, AJ discovers that his father was schizophrenic, had gone off his medication, and committed suicide – attempting to murder Kendra too – by crashing the car. In the hospital, a suspicious man in hospital scrubs makes an attempt to poison Madelyn, but then kills her father when he intervenes.
4	4	"Sabotage"	T.J. Scott	John Krizanc & Ellen Vanstone	28 October 2020	31 July 2019	354600-4	1.18
Madelyn regains consciousness, and identifies Daniel Hoffman as the man in the raft with her. Kendra looks deeper into Hoffman's potential involvement in the case. Madelyn learns of her father's death, while Dominic investigates the suspicious circumstances around it. AJ makes contact with a group planning an embarrassing attack on Bartok; he witnesses Janet leaking information on Kendra, and emails video proof to Kendra. Under scrutiny, Janet's explanation merely adds credence that she arranged the search to find the flight simulator, which she herself planted, in order to pin the crash on pilot suicide, and she is ejected from the TSIB investigation. AJ, having apparently bugged her computer as well, later watches as she conspires with BGA CEO Ethan Moreau to send their killer from the hospital after AJ. Kendra is forced to approach Bartok for help in retrieving the black boxes from the wreckage of the plane. AJ continues his criminal behaviour with a bomb attack on Bartok's car, which misfires when he sees Kendra meeting with Bartok and warns them. He is chased and shot at by the conspirators' henchman from the hospital, and is "saved" when hit by a car, drawing a crowd.
5	5	"Grounded"	T.J. Scott	Vince Shaio	5 November 2020	7 August 2019	354600-5	1.05
AJ recovers from his injuries in hospital; Howard removes Kendra from the investigation and replaces her with Levi – instead of next-in-line Dominic – citing the impropriety of AJ's attacks on Bartok. Kendra retrieves AJ's laptop, and views further incriminating footage of Janet and Ethan Moreau. Janet orders the conspirators' henchman to kill Kendra, but Dominic intervenes and the attacker escapes with the laptop. Kendra and Dominic inform Howard of the link between Janet and Ethan; he tells them that the British Navy is planning a second attempt to retrieve the black boxes, although Dominic later confirms this is not true. Theo and Kendra meet with a university professor who tells them that Hoffman was convinced there were security flaws in the software controlling the BGA aircraft. AJ reveals that Howard was the only person to activate the trojan AJ sent, not so inadvertently allowing AJ to record Janet and Ethan; Kendra deduces Howard is part of the conspiracy. Kendra, Dominic, Nadia and Theo turn their focus, with the help of Bartok and his submersible, to retrieving the black boxes from the sea floor. Nadia dives on the aircraft, where Esmaili's body is discovered at the controls of BGA 716.
6	6	"End Game"	T.J. Scott	Stephanie Tracey	12 November 2020	14 August 2019	354600-6	1.31
Nadia recovers the black boxes. Co-conspirators Ethan, Howard and Janet meet to discuss next steps. Ethan pressures Howard to produce a finding of terrorism as the crash's cause, which will hand the case to Janet. The conspirators have their henchman killed. Howard and Levi listen to the cockpit voice recording; Howard states it is proof that Esmaili crashed the aircraft as an act of fundamentalist terrorism, and tells Levi to close the case. Aided by Stefon Tark, a colleague of Hoffman's, Kendra finds Hoffman's files regarding a security vulnerability hidden on his gaming console. Janet intercepts her and tries to take it, but accidentally stabs herself with a poison needle intended for Kendra. Hoffman's files reveal his plan to take control of the aircraft and demonstrate the security flaw. However, a malfunction occurred and Hoffman failed to properly take control. With Levi's assistance, Kendra, Dominic, Nadia and Theo recreate the accident using a type-equivalent aircraft, with Ethan on board and Howard watching via television. Theo recreates Hoffman's interference, forcing Ethan to admit that he orchestrated a plan to cover up his failure to fix the security flaw, but blames Howard for the fallout. Howard agrees to provide information implicating Ethan. Donovan and Esmaili are cleared, while Howard and Ethan are arrested. With the share price of British Global Air plummeting, Bartok makes a major investment, saving BGA and making a profit. Kendra eventually discovers footage of Tark handing a laptop to Hoffman before he boards the flight. To acquire British Global Air, Bartok paid Tark to put a virus on the laptop to cause Hoffman to fail.

=== Season 2 (2021) ===
The plot featured an investigation of the crash of an automated high-speed train travelling to Chicago from Toronto. The accident leaves multiple deaths in its wake and a web of potential suspects which include, in addition to possible mechanical or software errors, the tech visionary who invented the train's control system; an anti-technology politician, and an FBI prisoner who disappears after the crash. When the feds swoop in to initiate a manhunt, Kendra's investigation evolves from finding the causes of the crash to working with federal agents to capture the fugitive.

No. overall	No. in season	Title	Directed by	Written by	Original Canadian air date	USA air date	Prod. code	Canadian viewers (millions)
7	1	"Runaway"	T.J. Scott	Vincent Shiao & Malcolm MacRury	13 July 2022	5 August 2021	354600-7	0.67
8	2	"Fugitive"	T.J. Scott	John Krizanc	20 July 2022	5 August 2021	354600-12	0.67
9	3	"Walk the Line"	T.J. Scott	Malcolm MacRury & Vincent Shiao	27 July 2022	5 August 2021	354600-11	0.59
10	4	"Wrecking Ball"	T.J. Scott	Nikolijne Troubatzkoy	3 August 2022	5 August 2021	354600-9	0.74
11	5	"Don't Tread on Me"	T.J. Scott	Marsha Greene	10 August 2022	5 August 2021	354600-10	0.71
12	6	"Witness"	T.J. Scott	Nikolijne Troubetzkoy & Vincent Shiao	17 August 2022	5 August 2021	354600-8	0.99

=== Season 3 (2023) ===
The plot follows the investigation into the sinking of a sea ferry, The Queen of the Narrows. It is a beautiful day in Boston when almost 500 passengers board the ferry destined for Newfoundland, Canada. A few hours into the journey, an explosion onboard throws passengers into a panic, rushing for lifeboats as the ferry takes on water with alarming speed. What unfolds for many of the passengers is an unimaginable nightmare with serious loss of life as the ship sinks in record time.

No. overall	No. in season	Title	Directed by	Written by	Original Canadian air date	UK air date	Prod. code
13	1	"The Tempest"	T.J. Scott	Jackie May & Vincent Shiao	7 August 2023	2 August 2023	354600-13
14	2	"Dead in the Water"	T.J. Scott	Bruce M. Smith	14 August 2023	9 August 2023	354600-18
15	3	"Stowaway"	T.J. Scott	John Krizanc	21 August 2023	16 August 2023	354600-17
16	4	"The Devil and the Deep Blue Sea"	T.J. Scott	Bruce M. Smith & Alexandra Clarke	28 August 2023	23 August 2023	354600-16
17	5	"Shot Across the Bow"	T.J. Scott	Vincent Shiao	4 September 2023	30 August 2023	354600-15
18	6	"What Lies Beneath"	T.J. Scott	Jackie May	11 September 2023	6 September 2023	354600-14

== Broadcast and release ==
NBCUniversal pre-bought the series to air it on Universal TV in the United Kingdom and Germany and on 13th Street in Czech Republic, Denmark, France, Ukraine, and Spain, as well as on Universal TV in Africa and 13th Street in Poland. On 14 July 2020, NBC's streaming service Peacock acquired the series in the United States, where it debuted on 17 September 2020. The distributor is Red Arrow Studios International, although Starlings Television managed the sale to Peacock/Universal. The NBCUniversal media conglomerate purchased the series for distribution in Europe and Africa. The first season premiered on 10 July 2019 on Universal with 5Star premiered on 20 September 2021 and Sky Witness premiering on 12 October 2021.

The second season of Departure was released on Peacock in the United States on 5 August 2021 and in the United Kingdom the series was released on Sky Witness on 1 November 2021.

The third season of Departure was released in the United Kingdom on 3 October 2022 with the premiere airing from 2 August 2023 on Sky Witness.

== Reception ==
The Hollywood Reporter was impressed with some aspects of the series but concluded its review noting the series had: "just enough enticing elements to pique curiosity, but [lacked] the execution needed to actually be good". The Variety review was quite positive and particularly praised Panjabi and Plummer in a "drama that punches above its weight". Based on viewing the first two episodes, the Toronto Star reviewer commented that "the action is as taut and absorbing as any detective thriller".

In 2021, the series was nominated for a Canadian Screen Award for Best Dramatic Series. The episode Vanished was nominated for the Directors Guild of Canada (DGC) Craft Award in the categories Best Sound Editing - Dramatic Series.

Christopher Plummer won the 2021 Canadian Screen Award for Best Supporting Actor, Drama. Vesna Svilanovic won the 2021 Canadian Cinema Editors Award for Best Editing in TV Drama. T.J. Scott and Christina Jennings won the 2021 Content Innovation Award for Best Returning Scripted Series.
