= Steve Wall =

Irish actor and musician

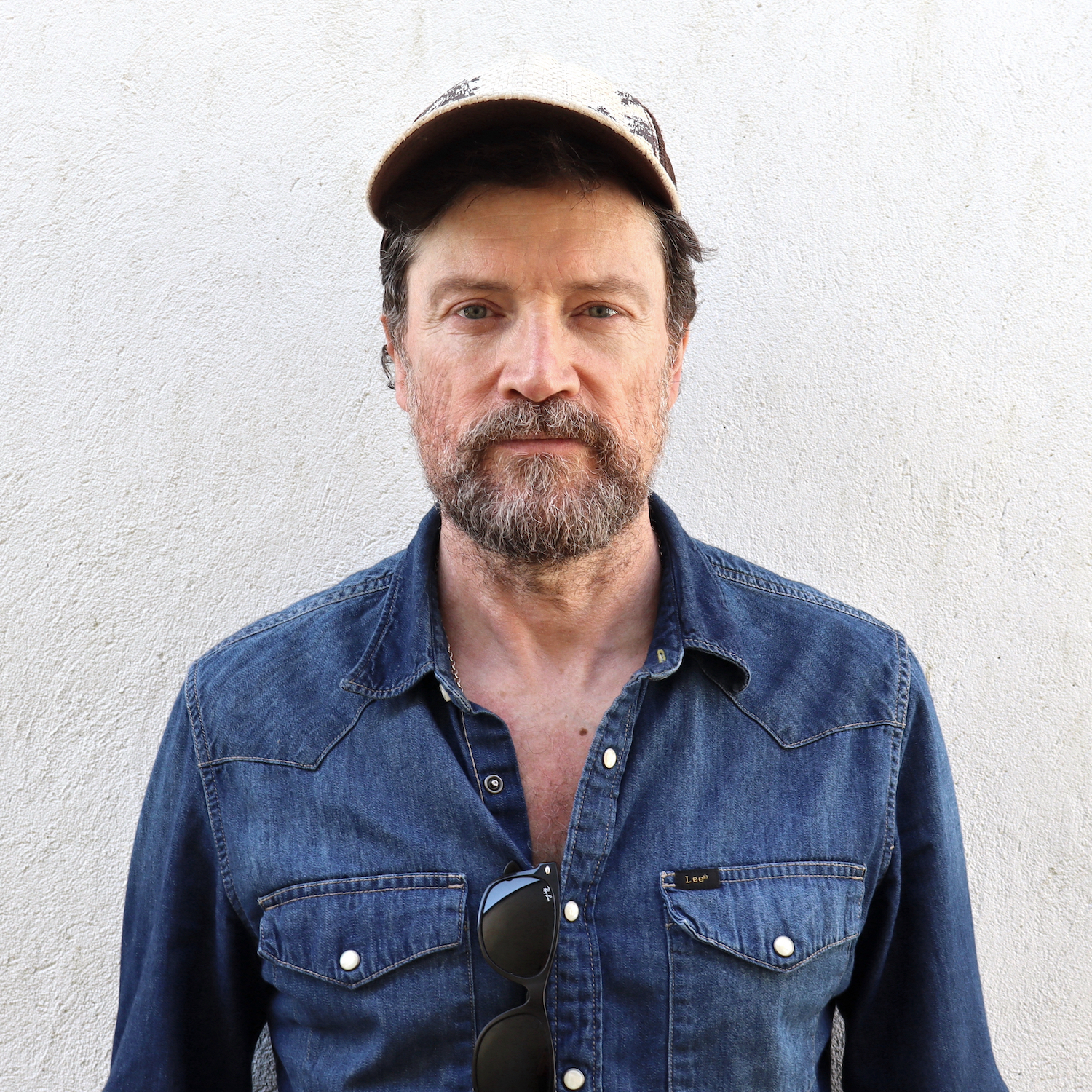
- Wall in April 2021
- Born: Stephen Wall; Kingsbury, London, England
- Occupations: Actor; musician
- Years active: 1984–present
- Children: 1

Steve Wall is a musician, singer, songwriter and actor. He is a founder member of the multi-platinum selling Irish band The Stunning and also The Walls.

As an actor, Wall is known for his roles in Moone Boy (2012–2015), Vikings (2014–2016), Rebellion (2016), Raised by Wolves (2020), The Witcher (2020), and The English (2022). He played the jazz musician Chet Baker in My Foolish Heart (2018), a Dutch feature film about the trumpeter's last days in Amsterdam.

== Early life and education ==
Steve Wall was born in Kingsbury Hospital, Honeypot Lane, the first of five children of Patricia (née Keogh) of the Liberties, Dublin, and Vincent Wall of Ennistymon, County Clare. Four of the children were born in London and while still young, the family moved back to Ireland, living first with the Keogh family in Harolds Cross. He has two brothers, Joseph and Vincent (born in County Clare), and two sisters, Anna and Helen. His mother's family home was full of records and sing-songs were regular, with uncles and aunts singing everything from Cole Porter to The Beatles and Ella Fitzgerald. This is where Wall says he discovered his love of music.

Wall attended several schools in Dublin - St. Louis Junior School, Rathmines; St. Joseph's National School, Terenure; and Templeogue College, where he left after the first year as the family moved to Ennistymon, County Clare, when he was thirteen. He spent his teenage years in Ennistymon and attended the Christian Brothers school there. Following that he went to the Galway Regional Technical College, where he joined a new wave band called New Testament as guitarist.

== Career ==
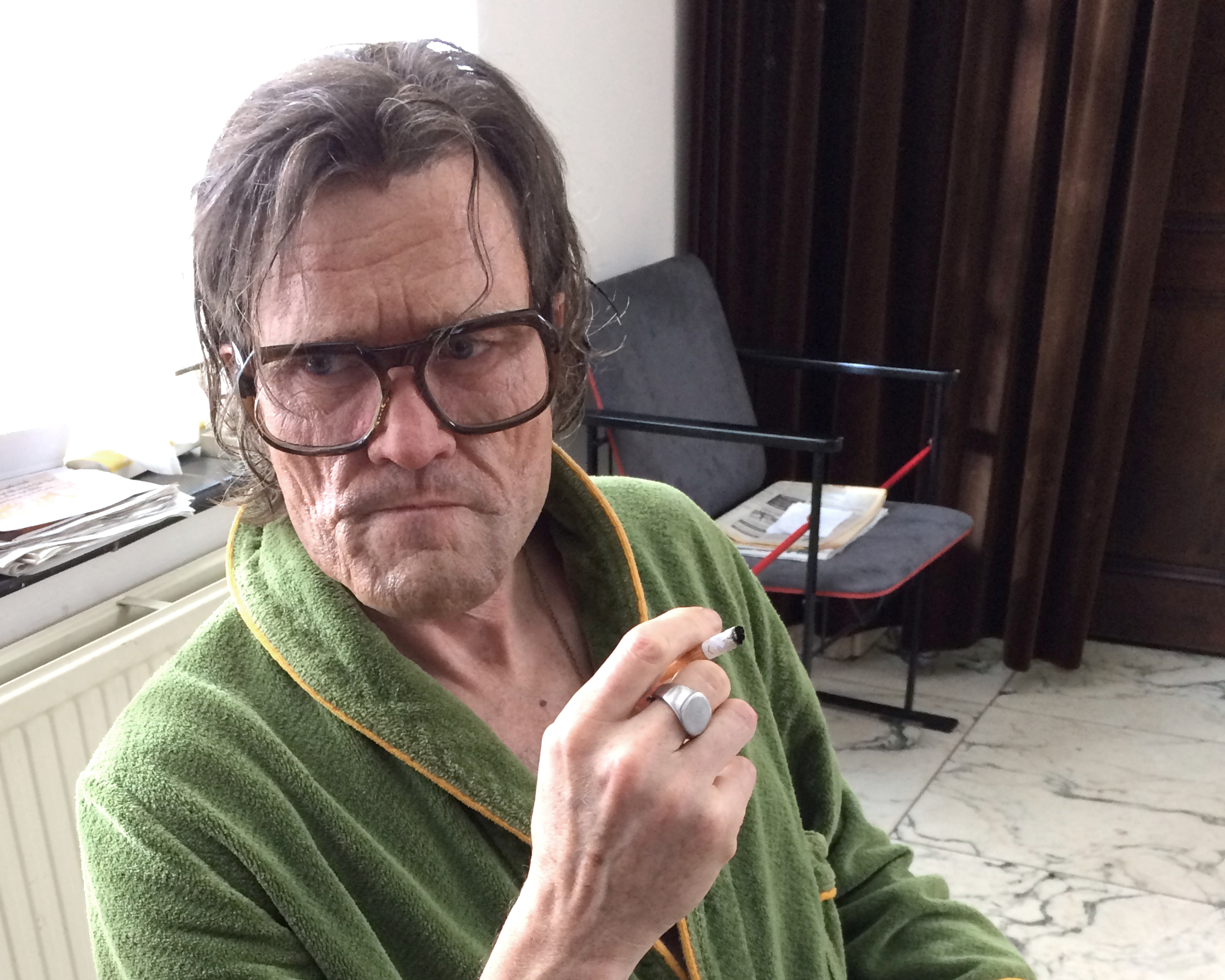
Steve Wall as Chet Baker on the set of My Foolish Heart.

=== Acting ===
While still at school in the west of Ireland, Wall developed an interest in acting and applied unsuccessfully to the main London drama schools. When college band New Testament went their separate ways in 1984, Wall approached the Druid Theatre Company, Galway for work. He had a small walk-on part in the 1984 production of Tom Murphy's On the Outside directed by Paul Brennan. He spent two years at Druid working as a trainee actor, stage assistant and sound operator, working on shows Conversations on a Homecoming and 'Tis Pity She's a Whore. He then moved to Dublin to pursue an acting career but after an unsuccessful year of finding work he decided to turn back to music and formed The Stunning in 1987. He still performs today with The Stunning and The Walls.

He returned to acting in 2010 by attending acting workshops in The Factory, Dublin, now known as Bow Street Acting Academy. He scored his first role as Uncle Danny in the series Moone Boy for Sky TV and then went on to land parts in other TV series such as Vikings, Warrior, The Witcher, Raised by Wolves, Tin Star, and The South Westerlies. He landed the role of Chet Baker in the Dutch arthouse feature film My Foolish Heart about the jazz legend's final days in Amsterdam where he died in 1988. He featured in the 2022 western miniseries The English (BBC/Amazon) featuring Emily Blunt and Chaske Spencer, in which he plays the cowboy Thin Kelly.

Denis Villeneuve cast him as Bashar, a Colonel-General of the Sardaukar in Dune: Part Two which premiered on 1 March 2024.

Wall was offered the role of Pats Bocock in the Gaiety Theatre's production of the John B. Keane play Sive. It was his first stage performance. It opened on 27 January 2024 and ran until 16 March 2024.

In 2024, he was cast as Lord Leo "Longthorn" Tyrell in the Game of Thrones prequel A Knight of the Seven Kingdoms.

He has also done voiceover work.

=== Music ===
Wall formed The Stunning in Galway in 1987. The band was hugely successful in Ireland with number one albums and top ten singles. Frustrated at not getting their music released internationally despite success at home, the band broke up in 1994. The following year, Wall and his brother Joe formed The Walls. They signed to Columbia Records in 1996 and relocated to London, spending two years there before moving to Dublin in 1998 and starting their own label Earshot Records, later changing it to Dirtbird Records. They released three albums on their own label - Hi-Lo (2000), New Dawn Breaking (2005), Stop the Lights (2012) as well as EPs and singles including the top ten hit "To the Bright and Shining Sun" and "Drowning Pool", which featured in the film Begin Again. The band toured extensively and opened for acts such as U2, Red Hot Chili Peppers, Bob Dylan, and Crowded House.

In 2003 The Stunning reformed in order to promote the re-issue of the band's debut album Paradise in the Picturehouse on their own Dirtbird Records label. The resulting tour was a success, sending the album to the top of the charts again almost ten years later. In 2017 they released "Brighten up my Life", their first new single in 24 years. This was followed by the album Twice Around the World, which peaked at number ten in the Irish mainstream album charts and number one in the independent charts on 23 March 2018. The Stunning continue to play live today, while Wall and Joe sometimes perform as a two-piece as The Walls.

In April 2021, Wall collaborated with Clare-based musician Simon O'Reilly on the song "Rise with the Sun". It was during the pandemic, so the two collaborated by sharing files online, with O'Reilly recording the music and mixing the song in his studio near Lahinch, County Clare and Wall recording vocals and some extra instrumentation in Dublin.

The Stunning have been performing regularly in Ireland since their reformation in 2003, headlining festivals and shows around the country. Notable events include the Big Top at the Galway International Arts Festival (2018, 2022, 2025); King John's Castle, Limerick; annual shows at the Three Olympia Theatre, Dublin; Forest Fest, Co Laois; Night and Day Festival, Co. Roscommon 2025.

== Filmography ==
=== Film ===
Year	Title	Role	Notes	Ref.
2000	Country	Showband Singer		
2013	Dark Touch	Matthew Collins	Credited as Stephen Wall	
2015	You're Ugly Too	Lawyer		
2016	Minutes Past Midnight	Peter	Segment: "Ghost Train"	
2017	Nails	Steve Milgrom		
2018	My Foolish Heart	Chet Baker		
2019	The Hole in the Ground	Rob		
2020	Fried Barry	Little Beast		
2020	Here Are the Young Men	Police Sergeant		
2023	Barber	Eddie Quinn		
2023	Dead Shot	Quinn		
2024	Dune: Part Two	Bashar		
2024	Oddity	Ivan		

=== Television ===
Year	Title	Role	Notes	Ref.
2012–2015	Moone Boy	Uncle Danny / Daniel / Danny Moone	4 episodes	
2014–2016	Vikings	Uncle Einar	7 episodes	
2015	Silent Witness	D.C.S Robert Drake	2 episodes	
2015	Crossing Lines	Dominic Fitzroy	2 episodes	
2015–2017	An Klondike	Sam Steele	a.k.a. Dominion Creek; 8 episodes	
2016	Rebellion	Detective Coleman	5 episodes	
2019	Warrior	Gresham	2 episodes	
2019	The Witcher	Boholt	Episode: "Rare Species"	
2020	Raised by Wolves	Ambrose	2 episodes	
2020	The South Westerlies	Baz	6 episodes	
2020	Tin Star	Sean McGrath	Episode: "Commitment"	
2020	Rig 45	James	6 episodes	
2022	The English	Thin Kelly	5 episodes	
2024	Harry Wild	Vincent 'Dutch' Holland	Episode: "Too Many Harrys Spoil the Murder"	
2024	Signora Volpe	Nick Wallis / Graham Conway	Episode: "Death of a Ghost"	
2024	Black Doves	Frank Young	2 episodes	
2025	Hidden Assets	Chief Bureau Officer Martin Dunlop	6 Episodes	
2026	A Knight of the Seven Kingdoms	Lord Leo "Longthorn" Tyrell	3 episodes	

== Stage ==
Sive by John B.Keane. Gaiety Theatre, Dublin. 27 January – 16 March 2024

== Narration ==
- The Irish Mob (2000) TV miniseries
- Recruits (2015) TV mini series about the gruelling process to join the Irish army.
- Making it Down Under (2016) TV show about Irish people working in Australia.
- Raised by the Village (three seasons 2019-2025 ) TV show about troubled teens.
