= Stephen McMillan (actor) =

Scottish actor

- Born: 21 December 1999 (age 26); Dundee, Scotland
- Education: St Paul's Roman Catholic Academy; Dundee College
- Occupation: Actor
- Years active: 2018–present
- Television: The North Water; Boiling Point

Stephen McMillan (born 21 December 1999) is a Scottish actor. Beginning his career in 2018, he has been in various films before his breakout role as Jamie in Boiling Point (2021).

== Career ==
From Dundee, he attended St Paul's Roman Catholic Academy before he studied acting at Dundee College. McMillan made his screen debut in David MacKenzie film Outlaw King alongside Chris Pine. He appeared in the award-winning short film Mind Yersel, by writer and director Bonnie MacRae, showing the reality of male suicide in Dundee, dubbed the ‘Scotland’s suicide capital’.

In 2021, he appeared as Jamie in the Stephen Graham restaurant-based drama film Boiling Point, and reprised the role in the 2023 television series sequel of the same name. In 2021, he could also be seen as a vulnerable cabin boy in the BBC Two adaptation of the arctic whaling drama series The North Water alongside Colin Farrell and Stephen Graham.

Film appearances in 2023 included Lynch in the Irish Republican Army drama Dead Shot, Richard E. Grant’s son Bertie Sinclair in The Lesson. and Norman in the short film Underbelly. He is young arsonist Brooker Higgs in 2024 film Harvest. He plays Ted Jenkins in Netflix series Toxic Town (2025).

His more recent roles include his appearance as Bobby in Bobby, and as James in Lewis Capaldi's Stay Love music video.

== Filmography ==
Year	Title	Role	Notes
2018	Outlaw King	Squire Drew Forfar	
2020	Mind Yersel		Short film
2021	Boiling Point	Jamie	Film
2021	The North Water	Joseph Hannah	Series (2 Episodes)
2022	Underbelly	Norman	Short film
2023	Dead Shot	Lynch	
2023	The Lesson	Bertie Sinclair	
2023	Boiling Point	Jamie	Series (3 Episodes)
2024	Harvest	Brooker Higgs	
2025	Toxic Town	Ted Jenkins	Series (3 Episodes)
2026	Bobby	Bobby	Movie
2026	Stay Love	James	Music Video
