= Billy Blind =

Song

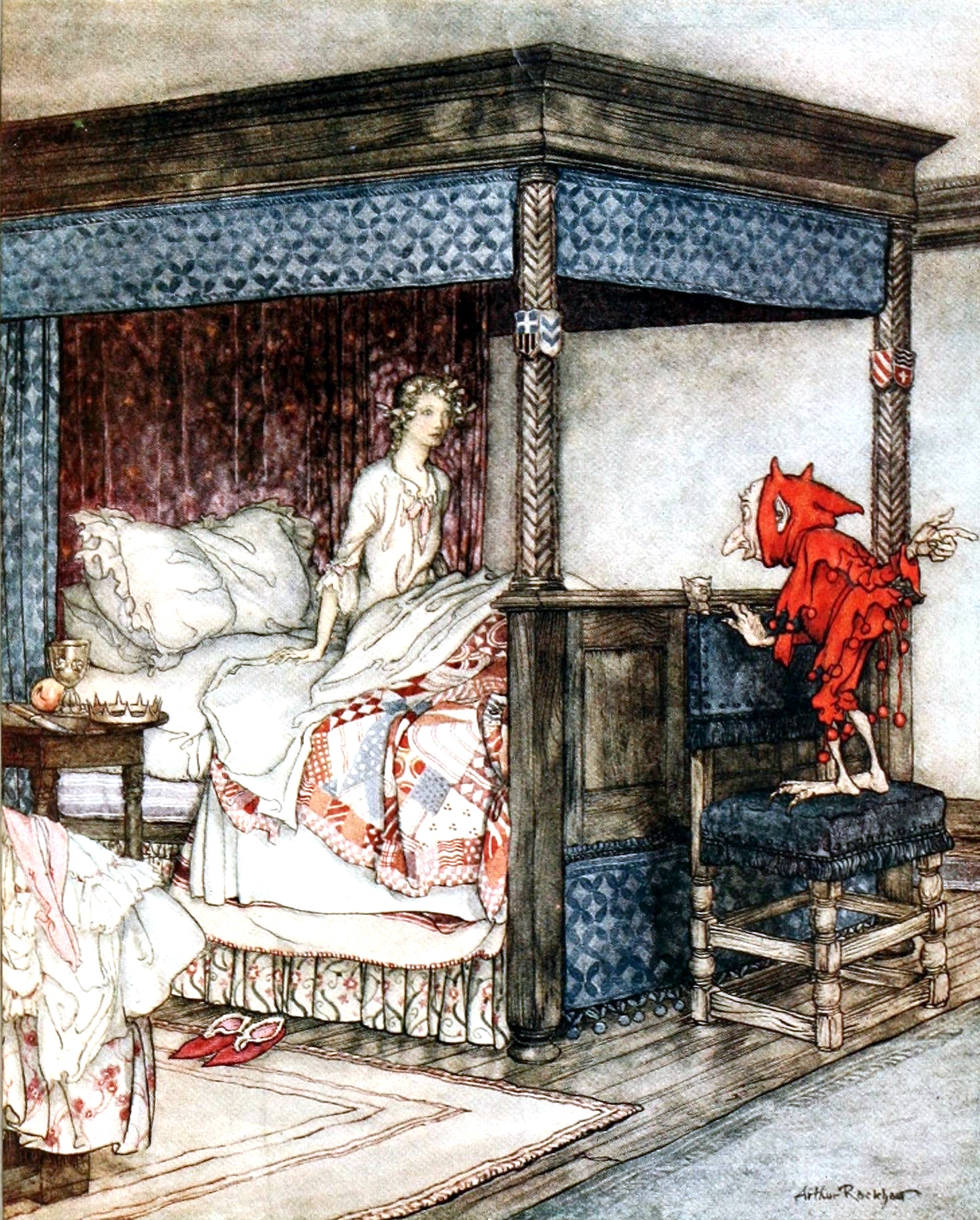
"O Waken, Waken, Burd Isbel", Illustration by Arthur Rackham to Young Bekie: Billy Blind waking Burd Isobel.

Billy Blind (also known as Billy Blin, Billy Blynde, Billie Blin, or Belly Blin) is an English and Lowland Scottish household spirit, much like a brownie. He appears only in ballads, where he frequently advises the characters. It is possible that the character of Billy Blind is a folk memory of the god Woden or Odin from Germanic mythology, in his "more playful aspect" and is speculated to have been the same character as Blind Harie, the "blind man of the game" in Scotland.

== In children's ballads ==
- "Gil Brenton" (no. 5c)- Billy Blind advises the hero that the latter's bride is not the woman lying beside him (who is a virgin) . The bride is hiding in her bower and already pregnant.
- "Willie's Lady" (no. 6)- Willie's wife has been in labour and cannot deliver because Willie's mother, a rank witch, is preventing her. Billy Blind advises Willie to make a wax figure of a baby and invite his mother to the christening. In her rage, the mother demands to know how all her magic was undone, listing all the things she's done, and Willie is able to undo them.
- "Young Bekie" (no. 53C)- He advises Burd Isobel that Young Bekie is about to marry another bride, and gives her assistance in the magical journey to reach him in time.
- "The Knight and the Shepherd's Daughter" (no. 110)- He appears in many of the variants to reveal the true births of the marrying couple: much higher than was apparent.

== Modern depictions ==
- In modern fantasy, Billy Blind appears in Peter S. Beagle's Tamsin (1999), in which his main characteristic is to give advice.
- In the British TV Series Renegade Nell (2023) about highwaywoman Nell in 18th century England, Billy Blind, played by Nick Mohammed, appears as a fictional fairy based on the same name character, and gives advice to Nell and superhuman capabilities during times of emergency.
