= Dead Shot (film) =

2023 film by Tom and Charles Guard

- Release poster
- Directed by: Tom Guard; Charles Guard
- Screenplay by: Tom Guard; Charles Guard; Ronan Bennett
- Based on: The Road to Balcombe Street by Steven P. Moysey
- Produced by: Chris Coen; Brian Coffey; Rebecca Brown; Thorsten Schumacher
- Starring: Aml Ameen; Colin Morgan; Tom Vaughan-Lawlor; Sophia Brown; Máiréad Tyers; Dara Devaney; Will Keen; Jack McMullen; Caolan Byrne; Stephen McMillan; Steve Wall; Andrea Irvine; Mark Strong; Felicity Jones
- Cinematography: Mattias Rudh
- Edited by: Ted Guard
- Music by: Max de Wardener
- Production companies: Upper Street; Stylopik; Piecrust Pictures; Highland Midgie; Ingenious Media; Rocket Science; Screen Scotland; LipSync Productions
- Distributed by: Sky Cinema
- Release date: 12 May 2023
- Running time: 92 minutes
- Country: United Kingdom
- Language: English

Dead Shot is a 2023 British action thriller film written and directed by Tom and Charles Guard, based on an original screenplay by Ronan Bennett and inspired by the book The Road to Balcombe Street by Steven P. Moysey. The film stars Aml Ameen, Colin Morgan, Tom Vaughan-Lawlor, Sophia Brown, Máiréad Tyers, Mark Strong and Felicity Jones.

The film was released on Sky Cinema in the United Kingdom, Ireland and other territories on 12 May 2023.

== Plot ==
A retired Provisional Irish Republican Army member (Morgan) witnesses the accidental killing of his pregnant wife and escapes, wounded and presumed dead, to 1970s London to plot his revenge.

== Cast ==
- Aml Ameen as Tempest
- Colin Morgan as Michael O'Hara
- Tom Vaughan-Lawlor as Keenan
- Sophia Brown as Ruth
- Máiréad Tyers as Carol
- Dara Devaney as Twomey
- Will Keen as Woodville
- Jack McMullen as Cole
- Caolan Byrne as Hogan
- Stephen McMillan as Lynch
- Steve Wall as Quinn
- Andrea Irvine as Fiadh
- Mark Strong as Holland
- Felicity Jones as Catherine

== Production ==
In February 2018, it was reported that Jamie Dornan and Sam Claflin would star in the film, then titled Borderland, from a screenplay by Ronan Bennett, who wrote the first draft in 2012. In July 2020, Tom and Charles Guard, collectively known as the Guard Brothers, signed on to direct the film; they also co-wrote the screenplay with Bennett, which was inspired by the book The Road to Balcombe Street by Steven P. Moysey. That same month, John Boyega, Jack Reynor, Jodie Turner-Smith and Felicity Jones joined the cast, with Dornan and Claflin no longer attached. In April 2022, Aml Ameen, Colin Morgan, Sophia Brown and Mark Strong were added to the cast, while Boyega and Reynor exited the film.

The film is produced by Upper Street, Stylopik, Piecrust Pictures, Highland Midgie, Ingenious Media and Rocket Science, in association with Screen Scotland and LipSync Productions. Producers are Chris Coen, Brian Coffey, Rebecca Brown and Thorsten Schumacher. The film's new title was announced as Dead Shot in April 2023.

Filming was originally set to begin in March 2021 but was postponed due to the COVID-19 pandemic. Filming began in April 2022 in Edinburgh and Glasgow. Props and other items from the set were donated to local charities in Scotland after location filming ended.

== Release ==
Dead Shot was released on Sky Cinema in the United Kingdom, Ireland and other territories on 12 May 2023. The film was released in the United States in cinemas and on VOD and digital platforms on 18 August 2023 by Quiver Distribution.

== Critical response ==
On the review aggregator website Rotten Tomatoes, Dead Shot holds an approval rating of 71% based on 24 reviews, with an average rating of 6/10.

Paul Whitington of the Irish Independent said the film does not deal in the "philosophical, nor does it offer the viewer much in the way of geopolitical context: it's a thriller, pure and simple, and a pretty efficient one at that." Leslie Felperin of The Guardian gave the film four stars, praising the period detail and the script, and commented that although "trajectory feels a bit preordained by dramatic convention, there are still stinging twists in store". Kevin Maher of The Times also awarded the film four stars and praised Ronan Bennett's script and called it a "gritty, breakneck B-movie that has moments of epic grandeur".
