= Aislinn Clarke =

Irish film director and writer

Aislinn Clarke is an Irish film writer and director.

== Life and career ==
Clarke was born in Dundalk, County Louth, Ireland, and was raised in Belfast.

She is known for writing and directing The Devil's Doorway (2018) and Frewaka (2024), and for writing the screenplay for Doineann (2021).
