= Damian McCarthy =

Irish filmmaker (born 1981)

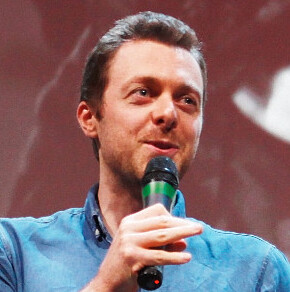
- McCarthy in 2013
- Born: 16 January 1981 (age 45); County Cork, Ireland
- Occupation: Filmmaker
- Years active: 2003–present
- Notable work: Caveat (2020); Oddity (2024); Hokum (2026)
- Website: hediesattheend.com

Damian McCarthy (Note: Also spelled as Mc Carthy.) (born 16 January 1981) is an Irish filmmaker, best known for writing and directing the horror films Caveat (2020), Oddity (2024) and Hokum (2026).

== Early life ==
McCarthy was born in County Cork on 16 January 1981. His interest in horror films was sparked by a video rental shop in Bantry that his father owned during the 1980s and 1990s. He studied Film & TV Production at St. John's College in Cork, graduating in 2003 with a distinction in scriptwriting and directing from the FETAC.

== Career ==
McCarthy made numerous short films from 2003 to 2017, supporting himself in between with work as an electrician. Some of his short films were screened at festivals such as FrightFest in London, Screamfest Horror Film Festival in Los Angeles, the New York City Horror Film Festival in New York, and the San Sebastien Horror & Fantasy Film Festival. He won the Melies d'Argent Award for Best European Short Film twice, as well as a Delta Film Award, an International Indie Short Film Award, and a Cutting Edge Award for Best Emerging Horror Director, among others.

McCarthy made his feature-length directorial debut at the age of 39 when he wrote, directed, and edited the horror film Caveat (2020), which received mostly positive reviews. He next wrote and directed the horror film Oddity (2024), which was a critical success. It won an Audience Award at South by Southwest. He made his Hollywood debut as the writer and director of the horror film Hokum (2026).

== Filmography ==
=== Feature films ===
- Caveat (2020) – writer, director, editor
- Oddity (2024) – writer, director
- Hokum (2026) – writer, director

=== Short films ===
- The Lonely Stag (2007) – co-writer
- Hatch (2009) – writer, director, producer, editor, composer
- He Dies at the End (2010) – writer, director, producer
- Hungry Hickory (2010) – director, producer, editor, sound editor
- Th3 Room (2010) – set decorator
- Never Ever Open It (2011) – writer, director, producer
- Jeremy Dyson's Haunted Recordings (2012) – co-writer, director, editor
- How Olin Lost His Eye (2013) – writer, director, producer, editor, composer, sound department
- Hands (2017) – writer, director, producer
