= Caveat (film) =

2020 film by Damian McCarthy

- Promotional release poster
- Directed by: Damian McCarthy
- Written by: Damian McCarthy
- Produced by: Justin Hyne
- Starring: Johnny French; Leila Sykes; Ben Caplan; Conor Dwane
- Cinematography: Kieran Fitzgerald
- Edited by: Damian McCarthy
- Music by: Richard G. Mitchell
- Production company: HyneSight Films
- Release date: 4 October 2020 (IndieCork Film Festival)
- Running time: 88 minutes
- Countries: Ireland; United Kingdom
- Language: English
- Budget: £250,000

Caveat is a 2020 horror film written, directed, and edited by Damian McCarthy in his feature directorial debut. Starring Johnny French and Leila Sykes, it follows a drifter suffering from partial memory loss who accepts a job to look after a psychologically disturbed woman in a house on a secluded island. Funded by British producer Justin Hyne through his company HyneSight Films, it premiered at the IndieCork Film Festival in Ireland on 4 October 2020. It is an international co-production film between Ireland and the UK.

== Plot ==
After being discharged from the hospital, Isaac, an amnesiac drifter, is hired by Moe Barrett to look after his brother Ed's daughter Olga. Ed died last year and Olga's mother went missing shortly after.

Moe brings Isaac to the house, which is on a remote island, and announces their presence via an intercom system. Isaac and Moe see Olga sitting motionlessly in her room, with her hands covering her face. Moe says this catatonic state is a regular occurrence. The job requires Isaac to wear a chained leather harness that prevents him from leaving the house or entering Olga's room.

Exploring the house, Isaac notices the harness chain starts in the basement, and finds a photo of himself with another man. When Olga wakes up, she roams the property with a crossbow. After experiencing various supernatural phenomena, including an eerie rabbit-drummer toy that spontaneously drums, Isaac discovers the corpse of Olga's mother hidden behind a thin basement wall using the drummer toy as a dowsing rod.

Terrified, Isaac calls Moe with the landline and informs him of the discovery, to which Moe replies he will "take care of it." Olga talks to Isaac, claiming he was at the house once, which he doesn't remember. Olga warns Isaac that Moe will not allow him to leave, and that Isaac trapped Ed in the basement. Olga calls Moe, who confirms the sequence of events.

Isaac locks Olga in her room and tries to free himself, eventually succeeds by retrieving the key hung around the corpse's neck. He leaves the house but cannot find a way off the island, and goes back. Seeing a catatonic Olga outside of her room, he straps the harness on her. Isaac then recalls Moe telling him to lock Ed in the basement. Olga comes to and wounds Isaac with the crossbow. Isaac remembers having second thoughts and trying to warn Ed with a note. However, he found Ed already locked in the basement and shot in the head with a crossbow bolt. After confronting Moe, he was pushed off a balcony, causing him to develop amnesia.

A compartment opens, allowing Isaac to get to the crawl space. Trying to leave the house, he is briefly stalked by the corpse of Olga's mother. He ends up behind the thin basement wall, just next to her corpse. As he tries to saw through the wall, the corpse eerily "stares" at him.

Moe arrives, enters the basement, and sees Isaac through the hole in the basement wall. Olga shoots Moe from behind and locks the basement door. Moe attempts to lure Isaac out, suggesting they attack Olga together, while secretly preparing to attack Isaac. However, Isaac's voice suddenly comes through the intercom, announcing he has already escaped. Startled, Moe drops his weapon and hides in the corner, where the corpse — having finished sawing through the wall itself — finds him.

Outside, Isaac frees a chained dog and finds Olga still chained in the harness and holding the crossbow. The two look at each other from a distance.

== Cast ==
- Johnny French as Isaac
- Leila Sykes as Olga
- Ben Caplan as Moe Barrett, Olga's uncle
- Conor Dwane as Olga's father
- Inma Pavon as Olga's mother
- Charlie as Jed the dog

== Production ==
Filming took place in West Cork, on a budget of around £250,000, with funding provided by British producer Justin Hyne through his company HyneSight Films. According to director McCarthy, "My friend Sam White's family owns Bantry House where we filmed. Actually, the house was way too nice—it's so beautiful, for what we wanted for this film, so a lot of it is sets built outside." The toy rabbit featured in the film was acquired via eBay by McCarthy, who "always had an interest in wind-up toys". It was stripped of its fur and sent to costume and prop builder Lisa Zagone, who finalised its design.

== Release ==
Caveat premiered on 4 October 2020 at the IndieCork Film Festival in Cork, where it was the opening film. It went to screen at several other film festivals, most related to the horror genre, before releasing on Shudder on June 3, 2021.

The film was screened at the 2021 Bucheon International Fantastic Film Festival in Bucheon, competing in the Bucheon Choice Features section.

== Reception ==
On Rotten Tomatoes, the film has an approval rating of 83% based on 46 reviews, with an average rating of 6.7/10. The website's critics' consensus reads: "An effective spine-tingler despite clear budget constraints, Caveat suggests a deliciously dark filmmaking future for writer-director Damian McCarthy." On Metacritic, the film has a weighted average score of 60 out of 100 based on seven critic reviews, indicating "mixed or average reviews".

Sheila O'Malley of RogerEbert.com gave the film a score of three out of four stars, calling it "an impressive and often terrifying film [...] and a reminder of how much can be done on a low budget if one is inventive enough". Noel Murray, in his review of the film for the Los Angeles Times, complimented McCarthy's confidence as a director, and compared the film to "a gothic horror tone poem, with pungent notes of decay". Guy Lodge, writing for Variety, called the film "more intriguing than it is rewarding", but wrote that "there's enough tingly, tightly budgeted atmosphere and witty genre gumption [...] to make one wonder what McCarthy could do on a looser, more expensive leash". Leslie Felperin of The Guardian gave the film 3/5 stars, writing: "McCarthy plays a fancy cinematic game of hide the lady, swishing the narrative cards around adeptly and finding fresh ways to imbue the material with an incrementally increasing sense of unease".

Dan Stubbs of NME was more critical, giving it a score of 2/5 stars and writing: "It is, undoubtedly, a fine set of players on the chess board of horror, but none of them seem to be playing the same game. The mystery being uncovered misses beats left right and centre, even if the bunny drums like John Bonham, and you'll probably find yourself losing interest right when the action should be reaching its thrilling climax".

The film ranks at #27 on Rotten Tomatoes' list of Best Horror Movies of 2021.
