= Hokum (film) =

2026 film by Damian McCarthy

- American theatrical release poster
- Directed by: Damian McCarthy
- Written by: Damian McCarthy
- Produced by: Roy Lee; Steven Schneider; Derek Dauchy; Ruth Treacy; Julianne Forde; Mairtín de Barra
- Starring: Adam Scott; Peter Coonan; David Wilmot; Florence Ordesh; Michael Patric; Will O'Connell; Brendan Conroy; Austin Amelio
- Cinematography: Colm Hogan
- Edited by: Brian Philip Davis
- Music by: Joseph Bishara
- Production companies: Image Nation Abu Dhabi; Team Thrives; Spooky Pictures; Tailored Films; Cweature Features
- Distributed by: Neon (United States); Black Bear Pictures (United Kingdom and Ireland)
- Release dates: 14 March 2026 (SXSW); 1 May 2026 (United States)
- Running time: 107 minutes
- Countries: Ireland; United Arab Emirates
- Language: English
- Budget: $5 million
- Box office: $25 million

Hokum is a 2026 supernatural horror film written and directed by Damian McCarthy. The film stars Adam Scott as an author who travels to a hotel in Ireland, unaware it may be haunted. Peter Coonan, David Wilmot, Florence Ordesh, Michael Patric, Will O'Connell, Brendan Conroy, and Austin Amelio appear in supporting roles.

Hokum premiered at SXSW on 14 March 2026, and was released in the US by Neon on 1 May 2026. The film received positive reviews from critics and grossed $24.5 million on a $5 million budget.

== Plot ==
Ohm Bauman is an American novelist struggling to finish his successful 'Conquistador' trilogy. After glimpsing the ghost of his mother, Ohm decides to visit The Bilberry Woods Hotel in rural Ireland, where his parents had honeymooned, to scatter their ashes. The hotel staff includes owner Cob, his son-in-law and front desk clerk Mal, groundskeeper Fergal, bartender Fiona, and bellhop Alby. Ohm overhears Cob tell two children the story of the Cailleach, a witch who takes children to the underworld in chains. Ohm is abrasive and dismissive toward the staff, but he warms to Fiona after she identifies the location of a photo his mother took. While spreading his parents' ashes, he meets Jerry, a local who lives in his van and frequently drinks milk laced with magic mushrooms.

Fiona and Alby tell Ohm that the honeymoon suite is locked and supposedly haunted by a witch. After belittling Alby's aspirations of a writing career, Ohm returns to his room. Later, Fiona finds Ohm's tape recorder at the bar. While attempting to return it, Fiona discovers that Ohm has hanged himself and saves him. Ohm awakens in a hospital and returns to the hotel weeks later. Mal informs him that Fiona has been missing since the hotel's Halloween party and that Jerry is suspected in both Fiona's disappearance and his wife's murder. Ohm confronts Jerry, who claims to have seen Fiona's ghost in the hotel, directing him to the honeymoon suite. Ohm doesn't believe Jerry, but agrees to check the suite with him. Jerry confesses to killing his wife, but says it was a mercy killing due to her illness.

With the hotel closed for the season, Ohm and Jerry break in to investigate. Fergal knocks Jerry unconscious before driving him to the police. Ohm sneaks into the honeymoon suite, where he is haunted by supernatural visions and childhood memories of accidentally killing his mother with his father's gun. Mal arrives, insisting that they leave the suite, but Ohm inspects a dumbwaiter, discovering Fiona's corpse inside. Mal locks Ohm in the suite and flees the hotel. Ohm finds his tape recorder next to Fiona and hears Fiona's recorded voice saying that she was pregnant with Mal's baby and that Mal drugged her and imprisoned her in the dumbwaiter to prevent his family from finding out.

Jerry awakens in Fergal's van and escapes to the hotel as Ohm struggles to find a way out. Spotting a fire escape on a map of the basement, Ohm descends via the dumbwaiter. He encounters the witch and returns in the dumbwaiter, but the witch crawls up the shaft after him. He fends her off with a protective circle of chalk. In the morning, Mal arrives at the hotel to dispose of Ohm but finds Jerry. Mal tells Jerry he took a drunk Ohm to the airport, but Ohm repeatedly rings the suite bell, alerting Jerry to his presence. Jerry grabs a hatchet and goes upstairs to the suite while Mal starts a fire in the building. Jerry breaks down the door, freeing Ohm, but Mal kills Jerry with his crossbow. Ohm grabs the elevator keys from Jerry's body and heads back to the basement, where he unsuccessfully attempts to draw a chalk circle around himself. Mal tries to escape the hotel, but discovers that the elevator gates are locked. He pursues Ohm to the basement to get the elevator keys.

Mal is confronted by the witch, who chains his hands and drags him to the underworld. Ohm, also shackled, makes peace with his mother's ghost, cuts his own chains using the tool that Fiona used to cut him down when he attempted suicide, and escapes. As the hotel burns, Fergal returns, hears the ghost of Ohm's mother calling out to him, and saves Ohm.

Alby visits Ohm in the hospital, telling him that Fiona's and Jerry's remains have been found, but Mal is missing. Alby admits to vengefully spiking Ohm's whiskey with Jerry's mushroom powder. Ohm recalls Jerry telling him that psilocybin allows people to open their minds to the supernatural. Ohm agrees to read Alby's manuscript and writes a more hopeful ending to his 'Conquistador' trilogy.

== Cast ==
- Adam Scott as Ohm Bauman, an author
- Peter Coonan as Mal, the desk clerk and Cob's son-in-law
- David Wilmot as Jerry, a man living outside the hotel
- Florence Ordesh as Fiona, the bartender
- Michael Patric as Fergal, the groundskeeper
- Will O'Connell as Alby, the bellhop
  - O'Connell also portrays Jack the Jackass, a children's show character
- Brendan Conroy as Cob, the owner of the hotel and Mal's father-in-law
- Austin Amelio as the Conquistador, the lead character of Ohm's novel
- Mallory Adams as Delia Bauman, Ohm's mother
- Sioux Carroll as the witch, a supernatural entity believed to reside in the hotel
- Ezra Carlisle as the boy, a child who accompanies the Conquistador in Ohm's novel

== Production ==
Hokum was written and directed by Damian McCarthy, and based on his own original story. The Irish-US production was produced by Image Nation, Tailored Films and Spooky Pictures with producers including Roy Lee and Steven Schneider as well as Derek Dauchy, Ruth Treacy, Julianne Forde and Mairtín de Barra. It has support from Screen Ireland. The cast is led by Adam Scott, and also includes Peter Coonan and David Wilmot.

Principal photography took place in County Cork in Ireland in February and March 2025.

== Release ==
In August 2025, Neon acquired worldwide rights to the film and handled international sales at the 2025 Toronto International Film Festival. Hokum premiered at the 2026 South by Southwest Film & TV Festival on March 14, 2026, and it was theatrically released in the United States on May 1, 2026. Front Row Filmed Entertainment released the film a day prior in the Middle East on April 30.

== Reception ==
=== Box office ===
Hokum grossed $17 million in the USA and Canada, and $8 million from other territories, for a worldwide total of $25 million.

The film made $2.6 million from 1,860 theaters on its first day of release in the United States and Canada, including an estimated $900,000 from Thursday night previews. It debuted with $6.4 million and finished fifth at the box office.

=== Critical response ===
On the review aggregator website Rotten Tomatoes, 90% of 209 critics' reviews are positive, with an average rating of 7.4/10. The website's consensus reads: "A classic haunted house story enriched with atmospheric folklore and perfectly-timed shocks, Hokum further solidifies writer-director Damian McCarthy as a modern master of horror." Metacritic, which uses a weighted average, assigned the film a score of 76 out of 100, based on 32 critics, indicating "generally favorable" reviews. Audiences polled by CinemaScore gave the film an average grade of "B" on an A+ to F scale.

=== Accolades ===
| Award | Date of ceremony | Category | Nominee(s) | Result | Ref. |
|---|---|---|---|---|---|
| Astra Midseason Movie Awards | June 30, 2026 | Best Horror Film | Hokum | Nominated | |
| Critics' Choice Super Awards | August 6, 2026 | Best Actor in a Horror Movie | Adam Scott | Nominated | |
| Fangoria Chainsaw Awards | October 25, 2026 | Best Wide Release | Hokum | Nominated | |
| Fangoria Chainsaw Awards | October 25, 2026 | Best Lead Performance | Adam Scott | Nominated | |
| Fangoria Chainsaw Awards | October 25, 2026 | Best Screenplay | Damian McCarthy | Nominated | |
| Fangoria Chainsaw Awards | October 25, 2026 | Best Cinematography | Colm Hogan | Nominated | |
| Golden Trailer Awards | May 28, 2026 | Best Foreign Horror | "Witch" (Black Bear / Ignition Creative) | Nominated | |
