= Máiréad Tyers =

Irish actress

- Born: 5 January 1998 (age 28); Ireland
- Education: Royal Academy of Dramatic Art (BA)
- Television: Extraordinary

Máiréad Tyers is an Irish actress. She is best known for her role as Jen in the Disney+ show Extraordinary (2023–24), for which she received a British Academy Television Award nomination.

== Early life ==
Growing up in Ballinhassig in County Cork, Ireland, Tyers had considered studying at University College Cork, but moved to London in 2017 following a successful audition for RADA. Tyers took part in a variety of stage and screen productions while studying at RADA, before graduating with a BA in acting in 2020.

Tyers was working in a cinema prior to landing her role in Extraordinary.

== Personal life ==
Tyers speaks English, as well as being proficient in Irish and French. She plays camogie, ultimate frisbee, and football. She sings soprano and can play piano to an intermediate level.

== Career ==
Whilst at RADA, Tyers had a successful table read with the academy's president, Kenneth Branagh, and subsequently appeared in his 2021 film Belfast. She appeared in the comedy play Changing the Sheets, at both Dublin Fringe Festival in 2021, and Edinburgh Fringe Festival in 2022.

Tyers played a small role in ITVX teen drama Tell Me Everything, which premiered in December 2022.

In 2023, Tyers appeared as Jen, the lead in Disney+ show Extraordinary, a role for which she was cast and started filming in late 2021. Speaking of Tyers, Ed Power in The Irish Times called it a “breakout performance” of a “star in the making”. For her role in season one of Extraordinary, she was nominated for Best Female Comedy Performance at the Royal Television Society Programme Awards in March 2024. In March 2024, she was nominated in the “Female performance in a comedy programme” category at the 2024 British Academy Television Awards. A second series aired on Disney+ on 7 March 2024.

Tyers appeared in the 2023 action thriller Dead Shot and in the period dramedy series My Lady Jane.

Tyers appeared on Channel 4's Sunday Brunch on 25 February 2024.

Tyers narrated the audiobook for The Morrigan by Kim Curran released 6 February 2025 and Heap Earth Upon It by Chloe Michelle Howarth released on 30 November 2025.

== Filmography ==
=== Film ===
Year	Title	Role	Notes
2020	The Unravelling	Abi	Short film
2021	Belfast	Auntie Eileen	
2023	Dead Shot	Carol	
2024	Meat Puppet	Girlfriend	Short film

=== Television ===
Year	Title	Role	Notes
2022	Tell Me Everything	Orla	Series 1; episode 1
2023–2024	Extraordinary	Jen	Lead role. Series 1 and 2; 16 episodes
2024	My Lady Jane	Susannah	Episodes 1, 3, 5 and 8
2025	Obituary	Vivienne Birch	Series 2; episodes 1–6
2025	The Walsh Sisters	Helen Walsh	6 episodes
TBA	The Rachel Incident	Rachel	Lead role
