= Louisa Harland =

Irish actress (born 1993 or 1994)

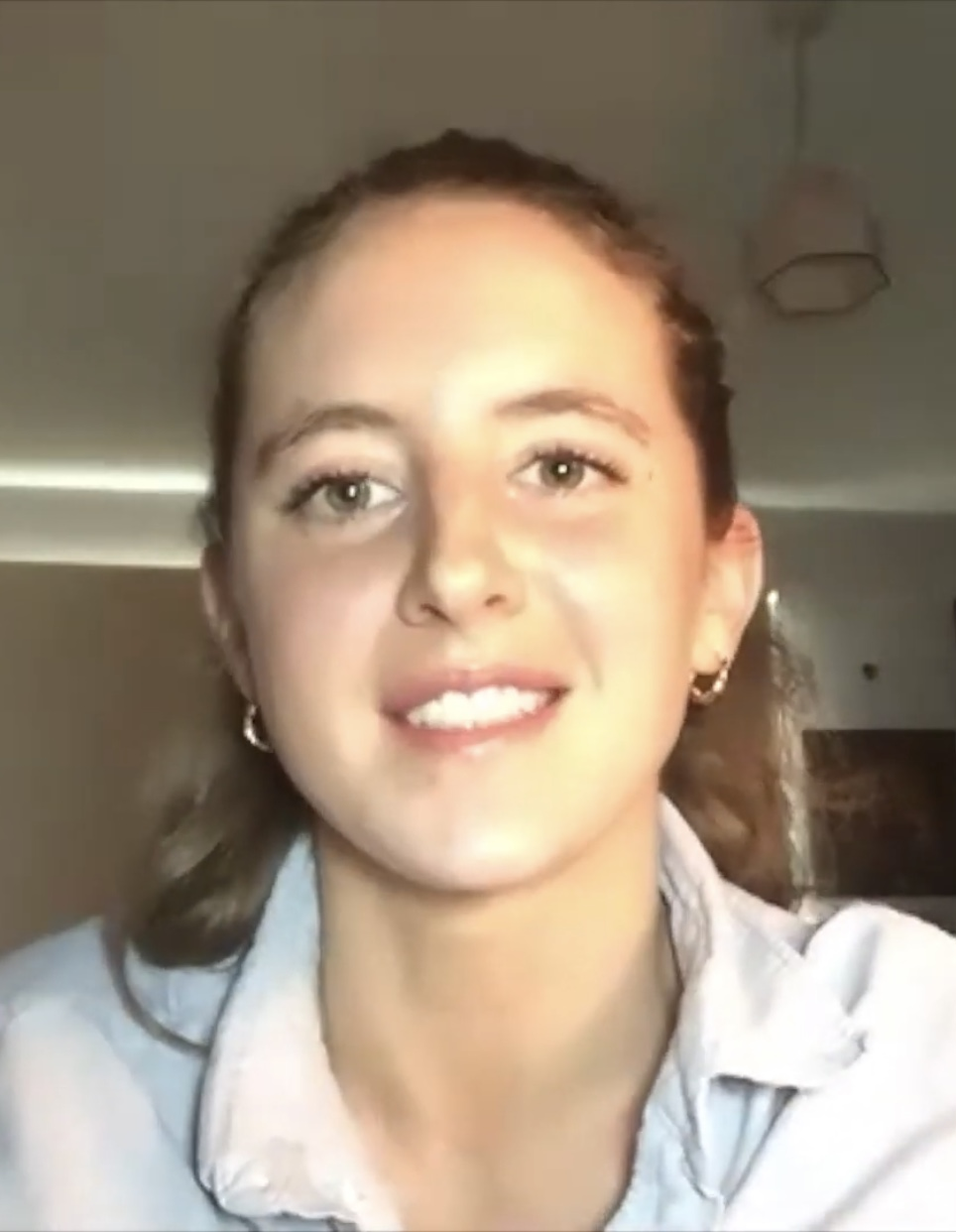
- Harland in 2021
- Born: Louisa Clare Harland; 1993 or 1994 (age 32–33); Dublin, Ireland
- Education: Wesley College Dublin Mountview Academy of Theatre Arts
- Occupation: Actor
- Years active: 2011–present
- Notable work: Derry Girls

Louisa Clare Harland (born 1993 or 1994) is an Irish actor. She is known for her roles as Orla McCool in the Channel 4 sitcom Derry Girls (2018–2022), as Nell Jackson in the Disney+ series Renegade Nell (2024), and as Anna Walsh in the RTÉ series The Walsh Sisters (2025).

== Early life and education ==
Louisa Clare Harland was born in 1993 or 1994. She grew up in Dundrum, Dublin, and has two older sisters, Katie and Ellie.

She was part of the Ann Kavanagh Youth Theatre in Rathfarnham, and later trained at the Mountview Academy of Theatre Arts in London.

== Career ==
=== Television and film ===
Upon graduation, Harland landed a recurring role as Kayleigh in season two of the RTÉ One series Love/Hate in 2011. She later appeared in films Rob Burke's Standby (2014) and Woody Harrelson's Lost in London (2017).

In 2017, it was announced Harland had been cast as Orla McCool, the eccentric cousin of Erin Quinn (Saoirse-Monica Jackson), in the Channel 4 sitcom Derry Girls. The first series aired in January 2018, receiving critical and commercial acclaim, and the second in March 2019. A final third series, as well as a special, aired in 2022.

On 26 June 2020, Harland and her fellow Derry Girls costars performed a sketch with Saoirse Ronan for the RTÉ fundraising special RTÉ Does Comic Relief, with proceeds from the night going towards those affected by the COVID-19 pandemic. That same year, Harland appeared in the film Boys from County Hell.

Harland plays the lead role of Nell Jackson in the 2024 Disney+ series Renegade Nell.

=== Radio ===
In March 2021, Harland performed with Sam Otto in an adaptation of the play Endless Second, by Theo Toksvig-Stewart, for BBC Radio 4. That May, she performed in an adaptation of the debut novel Snowflake, by Louise Nealon, for BBC Radio 4. In February 2026 she appeared as Louisa May Alcott in an adaptation of her short story Transcendental Wild Oats for BBC Radio 4.

== Personal life ==
As of 2023, Harland was in a relationship with English actor Calvin Demba.

As of March 2024 she was living in Ladbroke Grove, London.

== Filmography ==
=== Film ===
Year	Title	Role	Notes
2014	Standby	Julie	
2017	Lost in London	Stella	
2018	Sunday Tide	Violet	Short film
2020	Boys from County Hell	Claire McCann	
2022	BabyDolls	Barbara	Short films
2022	Noah	Kerry	Short films
2024	Joy	Rachel	
2025	Odd Socks	McBride (voice)	Short film
2025	Hamnet	Rowan	
2026	A Woman's Work	Jolene Harper	
TBA	The Animals †	Ramona	Short film. Post-production
TBA	The Custom of the Country †	TBA	Filming

=== Television ===
Year	Title	Role	Notes
2011	Love/Hate	Kayleigh	Series 2; 4 episodes
2016	Doctors	Caz Ellison	Episode: "Peanut"
2016	Harley and the Davidsons	Secretary	Mini-series; episode: "Race to the Top"
2018	Finding Joy	Tara	Episode: "Letting Go"
2018–2022	Derry Girls	Orla McCool	Main role. Series 1–3; 19 episodes
2019	Handy	Finnoula	Episode: "Pilot"
2020	The Deceived	Cloda O'Donnell	Mini-series; 3 episodes
2023	Big Boys	Midwife Kerry McFall	Episode: "The Night When"
2024	Renegade Nell	Nell Jackson	Lead role. 8 episodes
2025	The Walsh Sisters	Anna Walsh	Lead role. 6 episodes
2026	The Day	Freya	Post-production

=== Audio ===
Year	Title	Role	Notes
2021	Whistle Through the Shamrocks	Mammy	Podcast; 6 episodes
2026	Transcendental Wild Oats	Louisa	BBC Radio 4

== Stage ==
Year	Title	Role	Notes
2018	Cotton Fingers	Aoife	Aberaeron Memorial Hall, Aberaeron
2019	Glass. Kill. Bluebeard. Imp.	Niamh	Royal Court Theatre, London
2023	Dancing at Lughnasa	Agnes	Olivier Theatre, National Theatre, London
2023	Ulster American	Ruth Davenport	Riverside Studios, London
2024	Long Day's Journey Into Night	Cathleen	Wyndham's Theatre, London
