= Lauryn Ajufo =

British actress (born 2000)

- Born: 15 August 2000 (age 25); Southwark, London, England
- Years active: 2019–present

Lauryn Ajufo (born 15 August 2000) is an English actress. She was nominated for a British Independent Film Award for her role in the film Boiling Point (2021). She was named a 2022 Screen International Star of Tomorrow and appeared on the Evening Standard list of Londoners to watch.

== Early life ==
Ajufo was born in Southwark, London. She is of Nigerian descent. She attended the BRIT School and joined the Youth Theatre at the Theatre Royal Stratford East.

== Career ==
Ajufo was discovered in 2018 through a monologue slam competition. Philip Barantini cast her as Renee in his 2019 short film Boiling Point and gave her a role in his 2020 debut feature Villain. That same year, she made her television debut with a guest appearance in the soap opera Holby City. Ajufo went on to reprise her Boiling Point role in its 2021 feature length adaptation, this time playing Andrea alongside Stephen Graham. For her performance, Ajufo received critical acclaim and was nominated for the British Independent Film Award for Breakthrough Performance.

In 2022, Ajufo starred as Misha Morris in the Netflix science fiction series The Last Bus and Neve in the ITVX and ITV2 teen drama Tell Me Everything. In 2023, Ajufo had a main role as Becca in the teen drama Everything Now and appeared the film Luther: The Fallen Sun, both on Netflix. She also reunited with Barantini, starring opposite Chaneil Kular in the film Accused.

Ajufo made her professional London stage debut in the 2026 run of John Proctor is the Villain at the Royal Court Theatre.

== Filmography ==
=== Film ===
Year	Title	Role	Notes
2019	Boiling Point	Renee	Short film
2020	Villain	Laura	
2021	Boiling Point	Andrea	
2023	Luther: The Fallen Sun	Anya Raine	Netflix film
2023	Accused	Chloe	

=== Television ===
Year	Title	Role	Notes
2020	Holby City	Steph Shaw	1 episode
2022	The Last Bus	Misha Morris	Main role
2022	Tell Me Everything	Neve	Main role
2023	Everything Now	Becca	Main role

== Stage ==
Year	Title	Role	Notes
2026	John Proctor is the Villain	Nell	Royal Court Theatre, London
2026	Chewing Gum Dreams	Tracey Gordon	Theatre503, London

== Awards and nominations ==
Year	Award	Category	Work	Result	Ref.
2021	British Independent Film Awards	Breakthrough Performance	Boiling Point	Nominated	
