= Alice Feetham =

British actress (born 2000)

- Born: Alice May Feetham; Nottingham, East Midlands, United Kingdom
- Education: Manchester Metropolitan University
- Occupation: Actress
- Years active: 2016–present

Alice May Feetham is an English actress, best known for her role as Beth in the film Boiling Point (2021).

== Early life and education ==
Alice Feetham was born in Nottingham within the ceremonial county of Nottinghamshire, located in the East Midlands region of England. She graduated from the Manchester School of Theatre within Manchester Metropolitan University.

== Career ==
Feetham was cast in the role of restaurant host/manager Beth in the short film predecessor of Boiling Point, carrying the role into the 2021 feature film alongside Stephen Graham, and from thereon to the 2023 television series sequel with Vinette Robinson. In addition, Feetham is known for playing Bernie Melonzola on the television series Save Me, which also co-starred Graham, as her husband. For this role, she earned a nomination from the Royal Television Society for her performance. She also appeared in the limited series The Death of Bunny Munro, opposite Matt Smith and Lindsay Duncan.

== Filmography ==
Year	Title	Role	Notes	Ref.
2016	DCI Banks	Lilly Rundle	S05E03–04: "A Little Bit of Heart: Parts 1-2"	
2017	Doctors	Melanie Wilson	S18E152: "The Best Days of Your Life"	
2017	In the Dark	Rory Harcross	Episode #1.2	
2017	No Offence	Charlie Fegan	Episodes #2.2–#2.3 (+1 Soundtrack credit)	
2018	Save Me	Bernie Melonzola	Main role — 12 episodes (2 seasons)	
2018	Walk Like a Panther	H	Film debut	
2019	Boiling Point	Manager	Short film	
2020	Bancroft	Charlotte Hampton	Episode #2.3	
2021	Boiling Point	Beth	Feature film	
2021	I Am…	Deborah	S02E01: "I Am Victoria"	
2022	Doctor Who: The Ninth Doctor Adventures	Nel (voice)	S02E05: "Last of the Zetacene" (Podcast series)	
2022	Without Sin	Grace	Episode #1.3	
2023	Boiling Point	Beth	Episode #1.3	
2024	Ludwig	Hannah Waldron	Episode #1.2	
2025	The Death of Bunny Munro	Yvonne		

== Awards and nominations ==
Year	Award	Category	Work	Result	Ref.
2021	Royal Television Society Programme Awards	Breakthrough Award	Save Me	Nominated	
