= Hannah Traylen =

English actress

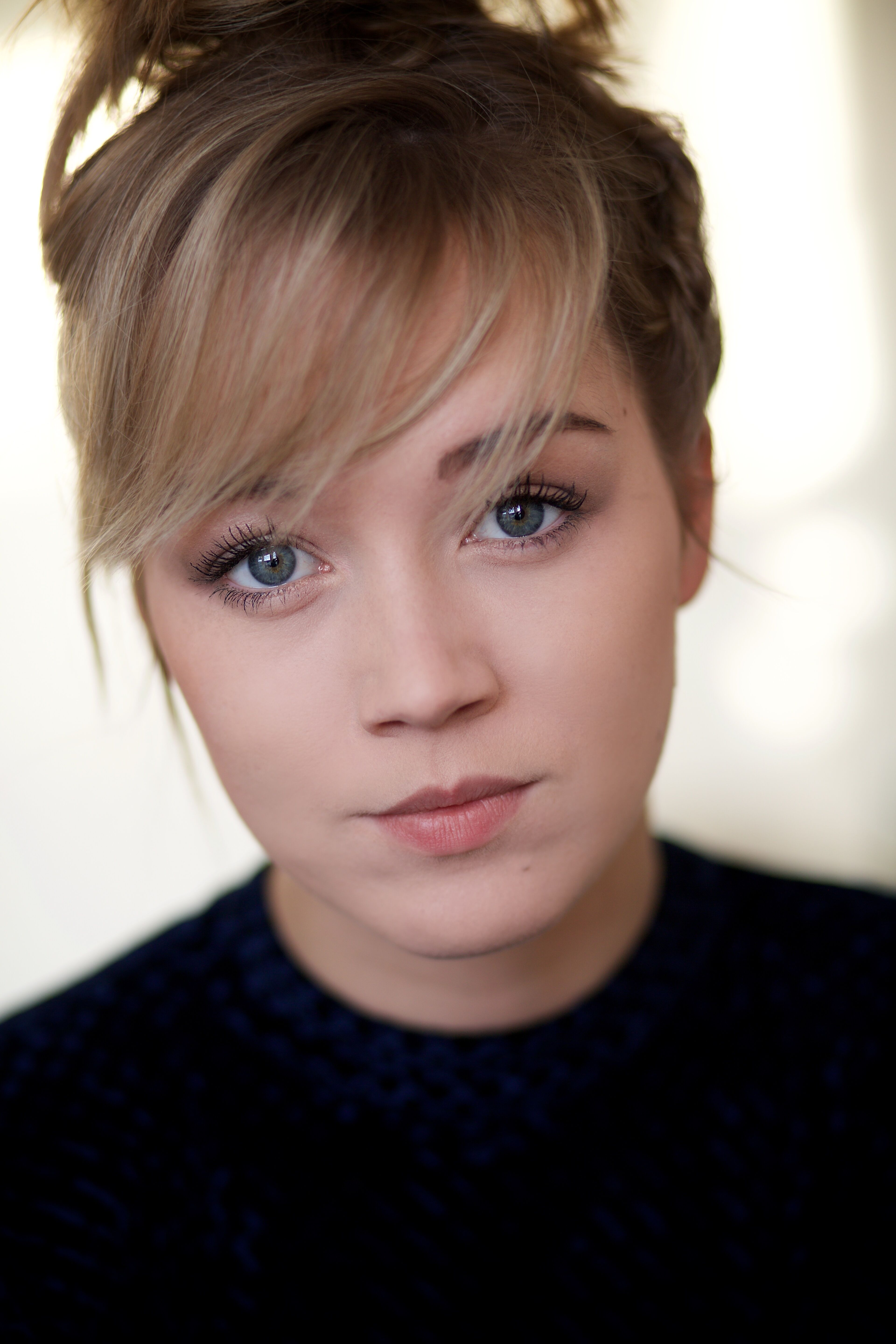
- Traylen in 2023
- Born: Hannah Traylen; 28 March 1995 (age 31); Crawley, West Sussex, England
- Education: Italia Conti Academy of Theatre Arts
- Occupation: Actress • Writer • Singer-songwriter • Producer
- Years active: 2016–present

Hannah Traylen (born 28 March 1995) is an English actress, writer, producer and singer-songwriter. She gained recognition as Holly in Boiling Point (2021 film) and Boiling Point (2023 TV series), and for her role as Chrissy in Ridley Road (2021).

== Early life and education ==
Hannah Traylen is of Northwestern European heritage and is from Crawley in West Sussex. Her family run a coach company. She has one sibling, Hollie.

Traylen studied at Oriel High School in Crawley. Whilst studying, her drama teacher, Nathan Gardner, who has links with Central Junior Television Workshop in Nottingham, noticed her talent and encouraged her to pursue acting professionally. Traylen credits Nathan and Abbie for supporting her to learn about drama schools, apply for courses and grants, and attend auditions.

Traylen was accepted into drama school at the age of 17, and trained at the Italia Conti Academy of Theatre Arts (2013–16), graduating with a BA (Hons) in Acting. In an interview with Wonderland (magazine) in 2023, Traylen said "I felt like Billy Elliot arriving at the Royal Ballet School."

Whilst training, Traylen won the Sir Alec Guinness Memorial Award (2016).

== Personal life ==
In 2026, Traylen was announced as an ambassador for ADHD UK.

Traylen is also a Patron for CFI Academy; a free, accessible training hub dedicated to empowering young filmmakers.

== Career ==
=== Film and television ===
Traylen's first television appearance was in a 2017 episode of Unforgotten. The same year, she appeared as Beryl, a young mother in active labour, in Call the Midwife, Nancy, in British period drama Harlots set in 1760s London, and Kenneth Lonergan's drama miniseries Howards End, based on E. M. Forster's 1910 novel of the same name, for BBC/Starz.

In 2021, Traylen played drug-dealer Holly, in the BAFTA-nominated one-take film Boiling Point. She played hairdresser Chrissy, in all episodes of Ridley Road, a BBC four-part drama thriller set in 1960s London, following a young Jewish hairdresser who goes undercover to infiltrate a rising neo-Nazi movement, alongside Agnes O'Casey, Tamzin Outhwaite, and Tracy-Ann Oberman. She also appeared as Mandy in the Netflix psychological thriller miniseries Behind Her Eyes, based on Sarah Pinborough’s novel of the same name, alongside Eve Hewson.

In 2022, she played protagonist Vix, in Signature Entertainment's crime horror film Hounded (released as Hunted in the United States and other international markets), alongside Samantha Bond, Nick Moran, and James Lance.

In 2023, Traylen reprised her role as Holly, in Boiling Point, as one of the principal cast members featured in the kitchen, and Vinette Robinson's character, Carly's, love interest. She also played guest lead, Hayley Collins, in an episode of Beyond Paradise, and featured in the award-winning Cadbury Dairy Milk commercial Garage alongside Mark Womack.

In 2024, she played Hayley, in the Paramount+ series Sexy Beast, and alongside Martin Freeman in BBC series The Responder, as Emma.

In 2025, she played Helen, in Aneil Karia's short film Vote Gavin Lyle, alongside Jack Lowden.

In 2026, she played Tia in Chris Green's thriller/drama film Synthesized, alongside Thomas Turgoose. She also played Claire in First Day on Earth.

Traylen's debut feature film as a writer is currently in pre-production with It's All Made Up Productions (Adolescence, Boiling Point).

=== Theatre ===
Since graduating from Italia Conti Academy of Theatre Arts in 2016, Traylen has appeared in a number of productions. Her performances have consistently attracted positive reviews from theatre critics.

The Stage reviewer Daisy Page, noted "Traylen gives the strongest performance, lending Frances some enlivening bite", for her role in Blessings at Riverside Studios (2025). And Aliya Al-Hassan for BroadwayWorld described Traylen as "standout" for bringing "believable nuance and heart to the role".

Samantha Collett for North West End UK described Traylen as "an absolute firecracker of a performer", for her performance as Rita in Educating Rita (2025), and said "Traylen is flawless", of her performance as Marianne in Constellations (2024).

In 2026, Traylen starred as Ruth Ellis, the last woman to be hanged in the UK, in Ruth The Musical at Wilton's Music Hall. Her performance led West End Best Friend reviewer Heidi Downing to write “Traylen is a powerful, standout performer who makes for a gripping lead throughout the show, highlighting the emotional intricacies and inner battles of Ruth Ellis, particularly in sensitive scenes regarding alcoholism, miscarriage and being a victim of violence." Simon Finn for Everything Theatre described Traylen as "a compelling stage presence, shining brightly and full of considered nuance".

=== Music ===
In 2018, Traylen released her debut 4-track EP Actions Speak Louder, under the alias Nearly T (an anagram of her surname). She quickly gained recognition from BBC Music Introducing, playing a live radio set with her band on BBC Introducing in Sussex & Surrey with Melita Dennett, which was broadcast across BBC Radio Sussex and BBC Radio Surrey. She appeared as the supporting act for UK garage pioneers Artful Dodger (duo) at Cargo in Shoreditch, London.

In 2026, she featured on Aymen Valentino's drum and bass single Addicted To Your Love, under the alias TRAYLEN. She wrote alongside Valentino, performed on the track, and directed the music video. She described the narrative, "a journey from drowning in love for others, back to self".

Traylen has explored themes of identity, vulnerability, love, and resilience in her music. It's been noted for "distinctive vocals and candid lyricism".

== Credits ==
=== Film ===
Key
†	Denotes films that have not yet been released

Year	Title	Role	Notes
2021	Boiling Point	Holly	
2022	Hounded	Vix	Known in some territories as Hunted
2024	Hard Times	Cathy	
2026	Synthesized	Tia	
2026	Vote Gavin Lyle	Helen	
2026	Intertidal †	Claire	
2026	The Wanting †	Penny	

=== Television ===
Year	Title	Role	Notes
2017	Unforgotten	Jasmine	2 episodes
2017	Call the Midwife	Beryl	1 episode
2017	Doctors	Sarah Edwards	1 episode: "Love and Duty"
2017	Harlots	Lennox Maid	2 episodes
2017	Howards End	Nancy	2 episodes
2019	Casualty	Hailey Dougan	1 episode
2021	Behind Her Eyes	Mandy	1 episode: "The First Door"
2021	Ridley Road	Chrissy	4 episodes
2023	Cadbury Dairy Milk "Garage"	Girl	Won: Campaign Big Awards: 30-Second TV Ad (2023), British Arrows Silver Award: Best Commercial 30–60 seconds (2023), ADCE Bronze Award: TV/Cinema Commercials (2023), and was recognised as the top-scoring ad of January 2023 by System1.
2023	Beyond Paradise	Hayley Collins	1 episode
2023	Boiling Point	Holly	4 episodes
2024	Sexy Beast	Hayley	1 episode
2024	The Responder	Emma	1 episode
2026	Casualty	PC Ashley Sullivan	7 episodes
2026	Cash In Hand †	Shaunie	1 episode
2027	First Day on Earth †	Claire	1 episode

=== Theatre ===
Year	Title	Role	Venue	Notes
2017	Heroine	Shelley	Theatr Clwyd, Sherman Theatre, HighTide Festival	
2018	A New And Better You	You	The Yard Theatre	Lead
2018	The Kneebone Cadillac	Maddy Kneebone	Theatre Royal, Plymouth	Lead
2022	Hoxton Street	Ella Maynard	Hoxton Hall	
2023	Folk	Louie Hooper	Frinton Summer Theatre	Lead
2024	Constellations	Marianne	Frinton Summer Theatre	Lead
2025	Educating Rita	Rita	Frinton Summer Theatre	Lead
2025	Blessings	Frances	Riverside Studios	
2026	Ruth The Musical	Ruth Ellis	Wilton's Music Hall	Lead

=== Voiceovers, Radio and Audiobooks ===
Year	Title	Role	Notes
2023	Scope	Narrator	Online commercial
2023	Tombola Arcade	Narrator	Radio commercial
2023	Carl Frampton: Men In Crisis	Narrator	TV commercial voiceover
2023	First Folio	Rosalind (Lead)	Radio play on BBC Radio 4
2023	Warner Bros. Studio Tour London	Narrator	Radio commercial
2023	Louis Theroux Interviews	Narrator	TV commercial voiceover
2024	National Grid Priority Services	Narrator	Dynamic radio commercial
2024	FA Cup	Narrator	TV commercial voiceover
2024	Too Good To Go	Narrator	Radio and online commercial
2024	Google Pixel 8 Pro "Magic Editor"	Hero: Female	TV commercial voiceover
2024	Google Pixel 8 Pro "Best Take"	Hero: Female	TV commercial voiceover
2024	Google Pixel 8 Pro "AI Mojo"	Hero: Female	TV commercial voiceover
2024	Sky VIP	Narrator	Radio commercial
2024	EE	Narrator	Radio commercial
2025	North Woods	Narrator & 5 characters	Radio play on BBC Radio 4 - adaptation of North Woods (novel)
2025	Mars Inc. "Petcare: Love Letters"	Narrator	Radio commercial
2025	National Grid Priority Services	Narrator	Dynamic radio commercial
2025	EA Sports FC 26	Football Player & Football Supporter	Video game
2026	Watch Your Back	Narrator & 32 characters	Audiobook
2026	Google Gemini for FIFA World Cup	Hero: Football Fan	Online commercial

== Discography ==
=== Extended plays ===
As lead artist

Title	Year	Publisher	Format	Details
Actions Speak Louder	2018	Ditto Music	Digital download	Alias: Nearly T; Released: 11 May 2018; Singer-songwriter

=== Singles ===
As featured artist

Title	Year	Publisher	Format	Details
Addicted To Your Love (Aymen Valentino featuring TRAYLEN)	2026	LANDR	Digital download	Alias: TRAYLEN; Released: 31 July 2026; Singer-songwriter & music video director

== Awards ==
Year	Award	Result	Ref.
2016	Sir Alec Guinness Memorial Award	Won	
