= Boiling Point (2021 film) =

2021 British film by Philip Barantini

- Theatrical release poster
- Directed by: Philip Barantini
- Written by: Philip Barantini; James Cummings
- Produced by: Hester Ruoff; Bart Ruspoli; Stefan D'Bart (co-prod)
- Starring: Stephen Graham; Vinette Robinson; Alice Feetham; Hannah Walters; Malachi Kirby; Taz Skylar; Lauryn Ajufo; Lourdes Faberes; Jason Flemyng; Ray Panthaki; Áine Rose Daly; Stephen McMillan; Gary Lamont
- Cinematography: Matthew Lewis
- Edited by: Alex Fountain
- Music by: Aaron May; David Ridley
- Production companies: Ascendant Films; Burton Fox Films; Bromantics
- Distributed by: Vertigo Releasing
- Release dates: 23 August 2021 (Karlovy Vary); 7 January 2022 (United Kingdom)
- Running time: 92 minutes
- Country: United Kingdom
- Language: English
- Box office: $1.1 million

Boiling Point is a 2021 British drama film directed by Philip Barantini and written by Barantini and James Cummings, based on a 2019 short film of the same name. It stars Stephen Graham, Vinette Robinson, Ray Panthaki, and Hannah Walters. It is a one-shot film set in a restaurant kitchen.

The film premiered at the 55th Karlovy Vary International Film Festival on 23 August 2021, and in cinemas in the United Kingdom on 7 January 2022, met with critical acclaim. At the 75th British Academy Film Awards, the film received four nominations, including for Outstanding British Film and Outstanding Debut by a British Writer, Director or Producer.

A continuation TV series, with Graham, Robinson, Walters, Panthaki and several other supporting cast members reprising their roles, aired on BBC One from 1 October 2023.

== Plot ==
Andy Jones is head chef of Jones & Sons, an upmarket restaurant in London. Andy is embarrassed to learn that his restaurant has been downgraded from a Food Hygiene Rating of 5 to a 3 following an audit by a food inspector, mostly due to insufficient administration and subpar sanitation at several work stations: new cold chef Camille washed her hands in the food preparation sink; while demi-chef Tony was not wearing gloves shucking oysters, thus risking cross-contamination.

After the inspector leaves, Andy reprimands the kitchen staff for their lack of thoroughness, but backtracks after the turbot he prepared earlier was discarded by the inspector for being unlabelled. Front of house manager Beth calls a meeting to discuss the evening's service being overbooked and warns short-fused saucier Freeman about his loud swearing. She then mentions they have a marriage proposal at one table; and also, a booking for celebrity chef Alastair Skye (with whom Andy previously worked) plus his guest, Sara Southworth — a known food critic. Andy is frustrated that Beth didn't forewarn him in time to prepare.

During dinner service, conflict begins to brew in the kitchen and dining room. Beth annoys the kitchen staff with micromanagement; the intended proposal girlfriend Mary's nut allergy was not entered into the system beforehand, irritating sous-chef Carly; Andrea, a black waitress, is treated with hostility by an aggressive racist guest, in contrast to her white colleague, Robyn; young pastry chef Jamie is revealed to be self-harming, but is comforted by mentor Emily; Sophia, a pregnant kitchen porter, spars with lazy, disrespectful co-worker Jake; the French Camille struggles with Andy's scouse and other British regional accents; and Tony feels out of his element at an atypical station.

Tension is further exacerbated when Beth demands the already-stressed chef Carly go off-menu by preparing steak and chips to appease a group of "influencer" guests. When a lamb dish is returned for being supposedly undercooked, Carly berates Beth. She blames Beth for neither properly instructing her staff nor entering guests' food allergies into the system beforehand. She scolds her for failing the restaurant with her insufficiency, and that no staff member likes her. Carly is also outraged to learn indirectly that she will not be getting a wage increase. Beth retreats to the toilets in tears, admitting to her father, the owner, on the phone that she feels inadequate.

Andy serves Alastair's table, where Alastair reveals that Andy owes him £200,000 and wants the payment in full to cover his private losses. Andy explains that he cannot reimburse him. Alastair offers to work together with Andy again and proposes that he should get a 70% share of the restaurant, leaving Andy and his other investors with just the remaining 30% to share between them. Meanwhile, the waiter Dean charms a group of ladies, one of whom inappropriately spanks him. Bartender Billy flirts with Robyn and they make plans to go to the club where Dean is DJing.

Mary suffers a severe allergic reaction, Camille is soon aware she has caused the error. Taking advantage of the situation, Alastair insists to Andy that Carly be the scapegoat, or else the restaurant — as well as their potential partnership — will fail. After Mary is picked up by an ambulance, the kitchen staff and Beth meet at the back of kitchen to determine the cause. They conclude that it was Andy's fault the food was contaminated: earlier, he had unwittingly instructed Camille to use walnut oil as a substitute garnish. This culminates in Freeman chastising Beth, then lambasting Andy for his incessant tardiness, mistakes, and alcoholism. A fight nearly erupts between Andy and Freeman, which Carly prevents.

The staff return to work as Carly attempts to quell Andy, until he reveals that Alastair insisted he lay the blame on her. Carly subsequently reaches her breaking point and declares she will seek another job. Andy goes to his office, where he has a mental breakdown. He drinks vodka and snorts cocaine. It is also revealed that the water bottle Andy had been repeatedly drinking from throughout the film did, in fact, contain vodka. He calls his ex-wife and asks her to tell his son he loves him, and that he will go to rehab.

After ending the call, Andy disposes the drugs and liquor and goes back to the kitchen but on his way there, he collapses to the ground. The staff's voices are heard calling his name frantically.

== Cast ==
- Stephen Graham as Andy Jones, proprietor/head chef
- Vinette Robinson as Carly, Andy's sous-chef
- Alice Feetham as Beth, restaurant host/manager
- Hannah Walters as Emily, head pastry chef
- Malachi Kirby as Tony, demi-chef
- Izuka Hoyle as Camille, French cold chef
- Taz Skylar as Billy, a bartender
- Lauryn Ajufo as Andrea, a waitress
- Ray Panthaki as Freeman, saucier/sauté chef
- Jason Flemyng as Alastair Skye, celebrity chef
- Lourdes Faberes as Sara Southworth, food critic
- Áine Rose Daly as Robyn, a waitress
- Stephen McMillan as Jamie, junior pastry chef
- Gary Lamont as Dean, a waiter
- Gala Botero as Sophia, kitchen porter
- Daniel Larkai as Jake, a lazy busser
- Thomas Coombes as Alan Lovejoy, health inspector
- Robbie O'Neill as Frank, Mary's boyfriend
- Rosa Escoda as Mary, patron with nut allergy
- Rob Parker as Kevin
- Katie Bellwood as Lizzie
- Alex Heath as Ollie
- Heather Gould as Joan
- Jay Johnson as Michael
- Kieran Urquhart as Tim
- Philip Hill-Pearson as Mark
- Hannah Traylen as Holly
- Jordan Alexandra as Bryony
- Diljohn Singh as Krish
- Shereen Walker as Hannah
- Precious Wura Alabi as Emma
- Ayanna Coleman-Potempa as Philly
- Kimesha Campbell as Lola
- Gina Ruysen as Kathryn
- George Hawkins as Sean
- John McHale as Owen
- Caroline Garnell as Gloria
- Jesse Jones as Nathan
- Hester Ruoff as Kelly
- Dan Tymon as Archie
- Libby Walker as a patron (uncredited)
- Gavin Sanctis as a patron (uncredited)

== Production ==
Boiling Point was directed by Philip Barantini and written by Barantini and James Cummings. It is an expansion of a 2019 short film of the same name, also directed by Barantini and starring Graham, which was nominated for British Independent Film Award.

Boiling Point is a drama film, filmed in one take (which Walters claims is the first one-shot film ever made) by cinematographer Matthew Lewis. It was shot in a real restaurant called Jones & Sons in Dalston, London, with the character of Andy Jones being named after Barantini's friend who owns the restaurant.

The film was significantly improvised or workshopped, rather than fully scripted. There were two weeks of rehearsal for the film, one with the camera man and director; and the second with the full cast. This was followed by one week of filming. It was planned to do two takes per night, but the crew only did four takes in total, selecting the third take as the final film. It was filmed during the COVID-19 pandemic, just before a lockdown. The film wrapped in March 2020.

== Release ==
The film premiered at the 55th Karlovy Vary International Film Festival on 23 August 2021, and in the UK at the London Film Festival on 10–11 October 2021.

It was released in UK cinemas on 7 January 2022.

The film was released on free-to-air streaming channels Channel 4 in the UK and SBS on Demand in Australia in September 2023.

== Reception ==
=== Box office ===
In the United Kingdom, the film earned $107,525 from 53 cinemas in its opening weekend. The film went on to gross $1,142,493 worldwide.

=== Critical response ===
The film received critical acclaim, receiving many positive reviews in the British and European press after the festival screenings. On the review aggregator website Rotten Tomatoes, 99% of 67 critics' reviews are positive, with an average rating of 7.9/10. The website's consensus reads: "Gripping from start to finish, Boiling Point uses its bold formal approach to support a thrilling tightrope of a tale." Metacritic, which uses a weighted average, assigned the film a score of 73 out of 100, based on 13 critics, indicating "generally favorable" reviews.

After the Karlovy screening, Peter Bradshaw wrote "There's lots of drive here and the pace doesn't flag: it actually becomes most interesting when there isn't anything obviously dramatic happening..." and praised Graham's acting in particular, saying "He has presence, potency and force". He did have some reservations, commenting on "a fair few stagey arguments", and gave the film 3 out of 5 in The Guardian. Mark Kermode, writing in The Observer after the film's cinematic release, gave the film four stars, calling it "a nerve-jangling night in hell's kitchen".

Glenn Kenny of The New York Times noted in regard to the film's one-shot nature that, "when [the camera] trails a restaurant worker taking out the rubbish, the viewer knows they're not being removed from the central action just to observe labour — there's a plot point to be ticked".

== Awards ==
Accolades received by Boiling Point
Award	Ceremony date	Category	Recipient(s)	Result	Ref.
BAFTA Film Awards	13 March 2022	Outstanding British Film	Philip Barantini, James Cummings, Hester Ruoff, Bart Ruspoli	Nominated	
BAFTA Film Awards	13 March 2022	Best Actor in a Leading Role	Stephen Graham	Nominated	
BAFTA Film Awards	13 March 2022	Best Casting	Carolyn McLeod	Nominated	
BAFTA Film Awards	13 March 2022	Outstanding Debut by a British Writer, Director, or Producer	James Cummings (writer) & Hester Ruoff (producer)	Nominated	
BAFTA Scotland Awards	20 November 2022	Best Actress in Film	Izuka Hoyle	Won	
British Independent Film Awards	5 December 2021	Best British Independent Film	Philip Barantini, James Cummings, Hester Ruoff, Bart Ruspoli	Nominated	
British Independent Film Awards	5 December 2021	Best Director	Philip Baranti	Nominated	
British Independent Film Awards	5 December 2021	Best Actor	Stephen Graham	Nominated	
British Independent Film Awards	5 December 2021	Best Supporting Actress	Vinette Robinson	Won	
British Independent Film Awards	5 December 2021	Best Supporting Actor	Ray Panthaki	Nominated	
British Independent Film Awards	5 December 2021	Breakthrough Performance	Lauryn Ajufo	Nominated	
British Independent Film Awards	5 December 2021	Best Cinematography	Matthew Lewis	Won	
British Independent Film Awards	5 December 2021	Best Casting	Carolyn McLeod	Won	
British Independent Film Awards	5 December 2021	Breakthrough Producer	Hester Ruoff	Nominated	
British Independent Film Awards	5 December 2021	Best Production Design	Aimee Meek	Nominated	
British Independent Film Awards	5 December 2021	Best Sound	James Drake, Rob Entwistle, and Kiff McManus	Won	
Casting Directors' Guild Awards	27 February 2023	Best Casting in an Independent Film	Carolyn McLeod (casting director) • Matt Sheppard (casting assistant)	Won	
Göteborg Film Festival	5 February 2022	Dragon Award for Best International Competition Film	Philip Barantini	Nominated	
Karlovy Vary International Film Festival	28 August 2021	Crystal Globe Award — Best Feature Film (Grand Prix)	Philip Barantini	Nominated	
Karlovy Vary International Film Festival	28 August 2021	Special Jury Mention — Performance	Vinette Robinson	Won	
London Film Critics' Circle Awards	6 February 2022	British/Irish Actor of the Year	Stephen Graham (also for Venom: Let There Be Carnage)	Nominated	
Taormina Film Fest	2 July 2022	Golden Charybdis for Best Film	Philip Barantini, Hester Ruoff, Bart Ruspoli	Won	
Taormina Film Fest	2 July 2022	Silver Charybdis for Best Director	Philip Barantini	Won	
Taormina Film Fest	2 July 2022	Mask of Polyphemus for Best Actor	Stephen Graham	Won	
Zurich Film Festival	3 October 2021	Golden Eye Award for Best International Feature Film	Philip Barantini	Nominated	

== 2019 short film ==
Boiling Point is a 2019 short film directed by Philip Barantini and starring Stephen Graham. It is a one-shot film set in a restaurant kitchen during the busy run-up to Christmas. The film was the basis of the later 2021 film and 2023 television programme of the same name.

== TV series ==
A continuation TV series, also titled Boiling Point, began airing on BBC One in October 2023, with Graham, Robinson, and Walters reprising their roles. Barantini directed the first two episodes, with James Cummings returning as writer.

== Remake ==
In 2025, a Turkish remake of this film starring Burak Deniz and Öykü Karayel was released on Disney+ under the title Umami (internationally known as Cooked).
