= Hannah Walters =

English actress (born 1974)

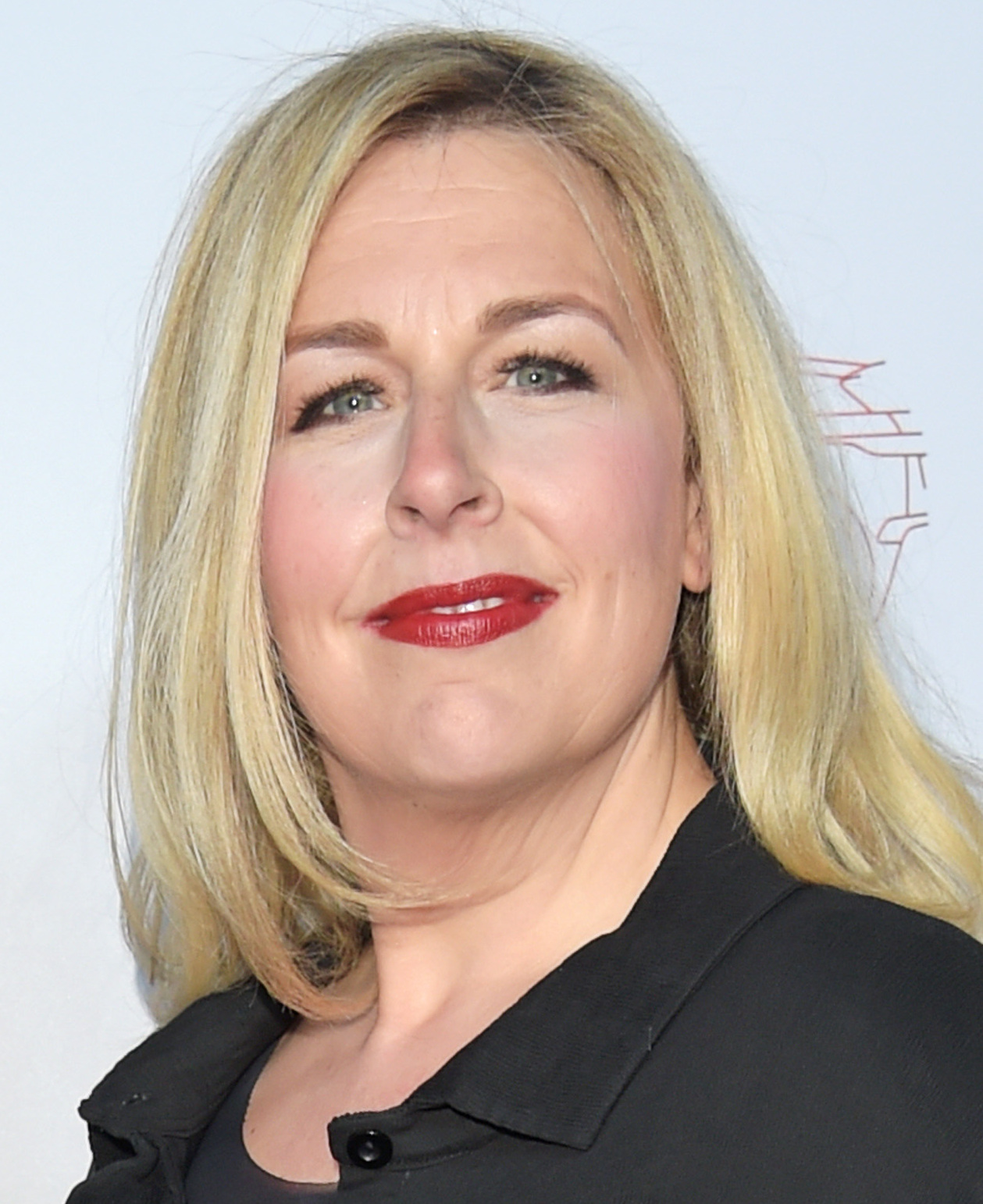
- Walters in 2018
- Born: 19 January 1974 (age 52); Ashby-de-la-Zouch, Leicestershire, England
- Occupation: Actor
- Years active: 2006–present
- Spouse: Stephen Graham (m. 2008)
- Children: 2

Hannah Walters (born 19 January 1974) is an English actress. She is best known for her work on This Is England '86, Whitechapel, No Offence, Boiling Point, and Adolescence.

== Early life ==
Hannah Walters was born on 19 January 1974 in Ashby-de-la-Zouch, Leicestershire, England. After her father died when she was five (and her mother was only 28), she and her older brother were brought up by her mother on her own. She had a strong relationship with her mother, describing her as having a caring nature. She died when Walters was 33.

Walters trained as an actor at Rose Bruford College of Theatre and Performance, graduating in 1996. There she met her future husband, Stephen Graham.

Before embarking on a career as an actress, Walters was a teacher of drama, educating GCSE and A-Level students.

== Career ==
Walters began her acting career in 2006, with a small role in The Thieving Headmistress.

=== This Is England (2006–2015) and Pirates of the Caribbean (2011-2017) ===
Walters starred as an unnamed "shoe shop assistant" in the Shane Meadows filmThis Is England (2006). She later starred in its film sequels, with the character name Trudy, in This Is England '86 (2010), This Is England '88 (2011) and This Is England '90 (2015).

Alongside her husband, Stephen Graham, Walters portrayed a Captain's Daughter Tavern wench in Pirates of the Caribbea: On Stranger Tides, and had the larger role of Pierre "Pig" Kelly's sister, Beatrice, in Pirates of the Caribbean: Dead Men Tell No Tales.

=== Boiling Point (2019–2023) ===
In 2019, Walters appeared in the short film Boiling Point. In 2021, this was developed into a feature film of the same name. Walters was an executive producer for the feature, alongside Stephen Graham. In the UK, the film earned US$107,525 from fifty-three theatres in its opening weekend. Worldwide, the film amassed US$1,142,493 in total box office sales.

The story is told in a single, uninterrupted shot. There were two weeks of rehearsal for the film, one with the camera man and director (technical team); and the second with the full cast. This was followed by one week of filming. They had planned to do two takes per night, but only did four takes in total, selecting the third take as the final film. The film was set in a real restaurant.

In 2023, Walters starred as pastry chef, Emily, in the series Boiling Point, which was set six months after the premise of the original feature film. She was also a co-director on the series. The series was broadcast on BBC One in October 2023, with all four episodes becoming available on its iPlayer streaming service the same day. The series was produced by Matriarch Productions. It was directed by Philip Barantini, who was also co-writer with James Cummings. Walters said that the series aimed to explore both the kitchen ("the microcosm"), but also further explore the lives of the characters ("the macrocosm"). In the series, we learn that Walter's character, Emily, is a member of Alcoholics Anonymous (AA).

Walters has said that, after receiving heartfelt reactions by viewers to the theme of self-harm in the feature film, "It felt almost like a duty of care to explore it again."

=== 2021–2025 ===
In 2021, Walters appeared in Jimmy McGovern's drama Time, as Sonia McNally, the wife of Stephen Graham's character, Eric McNally. Walters described the show as "gritty Northern". Although Walters learnt about the role by reading the script that came through for Stephen, she insisted she wanted to go to audition and get her role off her own merit and not just because she is Graham's wife.

In April 2023, Walters starred as Matron Beth Relp in the ITVX drama series Malpractice. Walters said about the production, "Malpractice has that element of being a medical thriller. But it's also about humanity and the chaos inside a human and how human beings react."

In 2023, Walters appeared as the sister-in-law to the title character in Sweet Sue, a film starring Maggie O'Neill, Tony Pitts and Harry Trevaldwyn.

In 2025, Walters featured in and executive produced A Thousand Blows. Walters played Eliza, a member of the Forty Elephants gang.

=== Adolescence (2025) ===
In 2025, Walters was the Executive Producer for Adolescence, a four-part TV drama exploring the case of a thirteen-year-old boy who is accused of murdering a teenage girl, created by Stephen Graham and Jack Thorne. She also starred in the second episode of the series, as Mrs Bailey. Walters said that the main aim of the series to start conversations, and hopefully enact social change.

According to The Big Issue, within three months, 142.6 million people worldwide had spent more than half a billion hours watching the series. The series also started conversations in the media and government about violence against women and girls by men and boys. Co-writer of the show, Jack Thorne, attended Downing Street to talk with prime minister Keir Starmer and culture secretary Lisa Nandy. Graham and Thorne also accepted an invite to a parliamentary meeting on the subject of online safety by Labour MP Josh MacAlister. The series has been made available free of charge for schools to use as a learning tool.

The series earned Walters a Primetime Emmy Award for Outstanding Limited or Anthology Series, and the ENVY Producer Award at that year's Women in Film and TV Awards in December 2025. The series was given a total of eight awards at the 2025 Emmys. Owen Cooper, the show's protagonist, was the youngest ever male Emmy winner, and Graham won Best Actor in a Drama. Graham also won Best Actor at the Golden Globes.

In an interview about the success and reaction to the series, Walters shared:

"I did not, hand on heart, realise the profound effects it was going to have on people. Parents are sending me lots of messages of thanks, lots of messages of gratitude, because they're opening those bedroom doors and talking to their children in ways that they hadn't talked to them before. I think that's all we needed to do - give everybody a little shake and say, come on, it's our duty now to make sure that this generation don't get lost, because it's so easy to lose them."

== Matriarch Productions ==
In 2020, Walters co-founded the production company Matriarch Productions with her husband, Stephen Graham. The company aims to create opportunities for those underrepresented in the screen industries, as well as first time writers and directors. The company is based in Leicestershire, where the couple live.

The company has produced the feature film and series of Boiling Point, Adolescence and A Thousand Blows. On A Thousand Blows, the company created a trainee role in every department, offering these to "people that wouldn't get it usually".

In 2026, it was announced that Disney+ has given Matriarch Productions a two-year first-look deal spanning both scripted and unscripted television.

== Personal life ==
Walters married actor Stephen Graham on 6 June 2008. They met while they were both training at the Rose Bruford College of Theatre & Performance. After being best friends for five years, Graham confessed his love to Walters, and they moved in together the following day.

Walters and Graham currently live in Ibstock, Leicestershire, having previously lived in the Beckenham area of London. They have a son, Alfie, and a daughter, Grace. In 2023, the family appeared on Channel 4's Standup to Cancer Celebrity Gogglebox special. Grace and Alfie have both tried out acting, playing Walters' children in Pirates of the Caribbean, and Alfie playing a young Graham in Walk Like a Panther. Grace has also worked at Matriarch Productions. Alfie has done some modelling.

In 2025, Walters and Graham had been in a total of thirteen TV shows and films together. Their first film together was This Is England in 2006. Subsequent projects they have both been on include: Pirates of the Caribbean: On Stranger Tides (2011), Pirates of the Caribbean: Dead Men Tell No Tales (2017), Walk Like A Panther, Boiling Point, Time and A Thousand Blows.

Walters has said that she took the back seat in the couple in their early careers, as "when we were both starting out, one of us needed to get a normal job. Acting doesn't help pay the mortgage when you're young." However, now that Graham is very successful, and their children are older, she has been able to come into her own.

Graham has been open about how his dyslexia means that Walters will help him to learn his lines as well as help to choose his next projects based on the scripts he receives. She reads through the scripts he receives, and if she gets through ten pages, she suggests Graham should take it on.

Walters has said that she and Graham have very different approaches in their work:

"He is very much a creative and incredibly on point when it comes to scripts and casting. He's got this innate ability to be able to see how it's going to end up. It marries well with my ability to pull things together, and we bounce off each other creatively. Then, as he calls it, I do the grown-up stuff! 'Hannah, you do the grown-up stuff and I'll do the fun stuff,' is what he says. But I get to do the fun stuff too."

Graham and Walters have backed a new three-year arts programme that aims to support the mental health and well-being of disadvantaged young people in Leicester.

== Filmography ==
Key
†	Denotes works that have not yet been released

=== Film ===
Year	Title	Role	Notes	Ref.
2006	This Is England	Shoe shop assistant		
2008	Filth and Wisdom	Business man's wife		
2011	Pirates of the Caribbean: On Stranger Tides	Captain's Daughter Tavern Wench		
2016	Gaslighting	Tracey	Short film	
2017	Funny Cow	Jean		
2017	Pirates of the Caribbean: Salazar's Revenge	Beatrice (Pierre "Pig" Kelly's sister)		
2018	Walk like a Panther	Gloria Giles		
2019	Boiling Point	Amanda	Short film	
2020	Pop			
2023	Sweet Sue	Sister-in-law		
TBA	Amazing Grace †	Grace		

=== Television ===
Year	Title	Channel	Role	Other Role	Notes	Ref.
2006	The Thieving Headmistress		Ms Wallis		Television film	
2009	The Antiques Rogue Show		2nd Detective		Television film	
2010	This Is England '86	Channel 4	Trudy		4 episodes; 2 episodes uncredited	
2011	Walk Like a Panther		Gloria Giles		Series 1, episode 1	
2011	Without You		Alison		Series 1, episodes 1 & 2	
2011	This Is England '88	Channel 4	Trudy		2 episodes; 1 episode uncredited	
2012–2013	Whitechapel	ITV 1	DC Megan Riley		12 episodes	
2015	Code of a Killer		Kath Eastwood		2 episodes	
2015	No Offence		Connie Ball		8 episodes	
2015	Playhouse Presents				Episode: "King for a Term"	
2015	This Is England '90	Channel 4	Trudy		Episode: "Winter"	
2021	Time		Sonia McNally		3 episodes	
2021	Boiling Point		Emily	Executive Producer		
2022	PRU	BBC	Jean		4 episodes	
2023	Malpractice	ITV	Matron Beth Relph		5 episodes	
2023	Boiling Point		Emily			
2025	A Thousand Blows		Eliza Moody	Executive Producer	4 episodes	
2025	Adolescence		Mrs Bailey	Executive Producer	Actor – 2 episodes; EP – 4 episodes	
2025	What It Feels Like for a Girl		Mommar Joe			
