= Boiling Point (2023 TV series) =

2023 British television series

- Genre: Drama
- Created by: Philip Barantini; James Cummings; Stephen Graham
- Based on: Boiling Point by: Philip Barantini; James Cummings
- Written by: Dan Cadan; James Cummings; Alex Tenenbaum; Nathaniel Stevens
- Directed by: Philip Barantini; Mounia Akl
- Starring: Vinette Robinson; Hannah Walters; Stephen Graham
- Theme music composer: Aaron May; David Ridley
- Country of origin: United Kingdom
- Original language: English
- No. of series: 1
- No. of episodes: 4

Production
- Executive producers: Philip Barantini; Stephen Graham; Rebecca Ferguson; Hannah Walters; Bart Ruspoli; Hester Ruoff; James Cummings
- Producer: Graham Drover
- Cinematography: Matthew Lewis
- Editors: Alex Fountain; Tommy Boulding
- Running time: 57–58 minutes
- Production companies: Ascendant Fox; Matriarch Productions; It's All Made Up Productions

Original release
- Network: BBC One
- Release: 1 October – 22 October 2023

Boiling Point is a four-part British television drama miniseries created by Philip Barantini, James Cummings, and Stephen Graham. Directed by Barantini and Mounia Akl, it is a continuation and standalone sequel of the 2021 film Boiling Point, also directed by Barantini and featuring many of the same cast. Starring Stephen Graham, Vinette Robinson, and Hannah Walters, the series premiered on BBC One on 1 October 2023, with all episodes released on BBC iPlayer on the same day. It was made for the BBC by Ascendant Fox, Matriarch Productions, and It's All Made Up Productions.

== Synopsis ==
The series picks up six months after the film ends with Carly (Robinson) now running her own restaurant, Point North, with most of former boss Andy's (Graham) staff.

== Cast ==
- Vinette Robinson as Carly, head chef at Point North
- Hannah Walters as Emily, head pastry chef
- Izuka Hoyle as Camille, French chef
- Áine Rose Daly as Robyn, waitress
- Daniel Larkai as Jake, kitchen porter
- Gary Lamont as Dean, Point North restaurant manager
- Hannah Traylen as Holly, kitchen porter
- Stephen McMillan as Jamie, pastry chef
- Taz Skylar as Billy, bartender
- Ahmed Malek as Musa, new front-of-house staff who works at the bar
- Joel MacCormack as Liam Astrid, businessman behind Point North
- Missy Haysom as Kit, new front-of-house staff
- Shaun Fagan as Bolton
- Stephen Odubola as Johnny, a new chef
- Cathy Tyson as Vivian, Carly's mother
- Stephen Graham as Andy, former head chef at Jones & Sons
- Steven Ogg as Nick, sous-chef
- Ray Panthaki as Freeman, sous-chef
- Sok-Ho Trinh as Sol
- Henry Meredith as Nathan

== Episodes ==
No. overall	No. in series	Title	Directed by	Written by	Original release date
1	1	"Episode 1"	Philip Barantini	James Cummings	1 October 2023
It's been six months since Andy's heart attack and the closing of his restaurant, Jones & Sons. His former sous-chef, Carly, just opened a northern influenced fine dining restaurant, taking most of the former kitchen and front of house staff with her. With Carly now head chef, Freeman has stepped into the role of sous-chef, but like Andy before her, the pressure of juggling her professional and personal life is taking a toll. Carly leaves to go home for a family medical emergency whilst her co-owner is entertaining a group of prospective investors. A new chef Johnny has bluffed his way into the position of chef de partie but is clearly out of his element. After Freeman loses this temper, he is called into a meeting with Liam and Carly. Pastry chef Emily visits Andy at home and tries to mediate between him and Carly but is rebuffed.
2	2	"Episode 2"	Philip Barantini	James Cummings; Dan Cadan	8 October 2023
Emily becomes Andy's Alcoholics Anonymous sponsor. Meanwhile, Liam began using a new produce supplier in an effort to cut costs, one that has substituted frozen for fresh meat. Jamie has his first dessert feature on the menu. But lack of confidence and intense pressure leads Jamie to commit an act of self-harm. Thankfully, Johnny administers first-aid until an ambulance arrives. Johnny still struggles with his duties. Carly discovers that a group of her friends are dining on one of the tables and realizes how life as a restaurateur has become all-encompassing when she has a chat with them. The emotional turmoil of the evening has Emily reaching for the bottle.
3	3	"Episode 3"	Mounia Akl	Alex Tenenbaum & Nathaniel Stevens; James Cummings	15 October 2023
When Carly decides to reduce the kitchen porters to one per shift in another attempt to reduce overhead costs, Holly offers to leave so that Jake can be kept on full time. Carly, unwilling to put all her eggs in one basket for a seven-days-a-week position, declines Holly's offer. Liam asks Carly if they can do a completely different menu for his brother's friend's wedding reception. Despite Carly's reservations, new sous-chef Nick is enthusiastic and offers to develop a menu. Emily confesses to Carly that she has started drinking again. Later, Andy meets with former Jones & Sons maître d'hôtel at his old restaurant, now trading under a new name, where he is asked to sign a legal document transferring his shares in the business over to Beth, as her father has paid off Andy's loan from Alastair Skye. He discovers Freeman working in the kitchen and the two reconcile. Andy tries to visit Point North and is spotted by Carly.
4	4	"Episode 4"	Mounia Akl	James Cummings	22 October 2023
Waitress Robyn struggles to concentrate in the kitchen after her audition fiasco and ruins some of the desserts. Andy visits Carly's flat, only to find that she is at work. Invited in by Carly's mother for a cup of tea, he learns that Carly has remortgaged the flat. Carly's mother suggests her daughter could use some help. Whilst most of the staff go out partying, Carly has a rather awkward date with a male lawyer which she cuts short to join her staff at the club. Andy arrives at Point North to find only Nick still there and leaves a message with him. When Liam shows up at the club, and accidentally reveals the restaurant's finances are in dire straits and drops the bombshell that he has filed for bankruptcy, Carly finds solace in the arms of Holly, and they share a passionate kiss. Carly finally pays Andy a visit and the two have a heart to heart. When she reveals her restaurant has failed, Andy offers his support when she needs it most.

== Production ==
The series is a sequel to the 2021 film Boiling Point, a one-shot film set in a restaurant kitchen. It itself was an expansion of a 2019 short film of the same name, also directed by Philip Barantini and starring Stephen Graham. In October 2022 it was announced that a series following on from the film with the same creative team had been commissioned by BBC One.

The series consists of four one-hour episodes, with Barantini directing the first two and Mounia Akl directing the last two. Graham Drover is the series producer and Rebecca Ferguson is executive producer for the BBC. The series is written by James Cummings with writers Dan Cadan, Alex Tenenbaum, and Nathaniel Stevens joining the team.

Walters said that the series aimed to explore both the kitchen ("the microcosm"), but also further explore the lives of the characters ("the macrocosm").

The final script of the film is a result of a collaborative approach both using the original script and improvisation.

=== Casting ===
In February 2023 Steven Ogg was revealed to have joined the cast. Graham, Robinson, and Walters all reprise their original roles from the film, as do Panthaki, Lamont, Daly, Skylar, Larkai, McMillan, Traylen, and Hoyle. An open casting was run, which is how the team found Missy Haysom, who had not acted before.

=== Filming ===
Filming began in January 2023 in Manchester.

Whilst the series does not consist of one-shot episodes, the production team endeavoured to retain some long shots which allude to this aspect of the original film, including an opening scene lasting eleven minutes in episode one. Unlike the original feature film, which was filmed in a real kitchen, the series was filmed on a set, which allowed for a broader variety of shots.

== Broadcast ==
Episode one aired on BBC One in the United Kingdom on 1 October 2023 in the 9pm time slot, with all four episodes becoming available on its iPlayer streaming service the same day.

BBC Studios handled international distribution.

== Reception ==
=== Critical reception ===
On the review aggregator website Rotten Tomatoes, 100% of 19 critics' reviews are positive, with an average rating of 8.3/10. The website's consensus reads: "A culinary drama with palpable tension simmering beneath the surface, Boiling Point generates an absorbing amount of heat."

Nick Clark of the Evening Standard gave it a five out of five stars, commenting that it "gives us just a taste of the anxiety and the adrenaline of this world. It's an extraordinary peek behind the kitchen door, and an uncomfortable one. But as a drama, the ingredients are spot on and the execution superb." Another five star review came from Morgan Cormack of The Radio Times, describing it as "a perfect example of what stellar character-driven drama is." Of the casting, Morgan opined that "the magic of having such an ensemble isn't to be taken lightly - it truly is a work of magnificence."

Dan Einav of the Financial Times awarded the show four stars, stating that "The main cast broadly rise to the challenge but there's a ready-made quality to some of the plotting and scene-setting. The point that chefs both depend on and deplore their customers is overstretched... It can also strain credulity to make each night revolve around a disaster." Another four star review came from Nick Hilton of The Independent, again praising both the “quality of the acting” and the writing. Four stars also from Emily Baker of the i, who said that the “TV version never quite matched the heights” of the feature film and bemoaned the lack of screen time afforded to Stephen Graham.

The Times critic, Carol Midgley also awarded the show four stars, as did Rebecca Nicholson at The Guardian, who also singled out the “excellent cast.” The Observer's Joel Golby lauded "a brilliant script, a phenomenal cast and some absolutely beautiful filming" and went on to state that "this hugely stressful series is one of the best things on television this year... British TV at its very finest."

The Guardian said the series "piles stress upon stress, with a garnish of extra stress...This is not a leisurely watch", and say some of the personal issues the characters face "start to veer towards the melodramatic". However, the review praises the "excellent cast".

=== Accolades ===
The series was nominated for Best Limited Series at the Royal Television Society Programme Awards in March 2024. The series was nominated for Best Drama Series, and Robinson for Best Actress, at the 2024 Broadcasting Press Guild Awards.
