= Spit of You =

Single by Sam Fender

from the album Seventeen Going Under
- Released: 27 September 2021
- Recorded: Grouse Lodge, Ireland
- Length: 4:33
- Label: Polydor
- Songwriter: Sam Fender
- Producer: Bramwell Bronte

Sam Fender singles chronology
| "Get You Down" (2021) | "Spit of You" (2021) | "Long Way Off" (2021) |

Music video
- "Spit of You" on YouTube

"Spit of You" is a song by English singer-songwriter Sam Fender, released by Polydor Records on 27 September 2021 as the third single from his second studio album Seventeen Going Under (2021).

Its accompanying music video, directed by Philip Barantini, was released on 6 October 2021 and stars Fender alongside British actor Stephen Graham as his father. Barantini and Fender received Best Rock Video − UK award at the 2022 UK Music Video Awards for the video.

"Spit of You" peaked at number 41 on the UK Singles Chart.

== Background ==
Fender described the song in a press release as being "about boys and their dads". He went on to explain how his experiences with his own father inspired the song, particularly their shared struggle of being unable to communicate their emotions with each other. Fender also noted how their relationship has changed as he has gotten older, saying, "I see so much of myself in him", and "if anything, it's a declaration of love for him".

== Commercial performance ==
"Spit of You" peaked at number 41 on the UK Singles Chart.

== Music video ==
An accompanying music video, directed by Philip Barantini, was released a week following the song on 6 October 2021. It stars British actor Stephen Graham as Fender's father. The music video follows their fluctuating relationship as they "watch TV, play pool and go on a camping trip together" before having a fierce argument and an eventual reconcilement.

On 27 October 2022, it was the recipient of the "Best Rock Video − UK" award at the 2022 UK Music Video Awards, beating another of Fender's songs, "Getting Started", and songs by other nominees Foals, Florence + the Machine, Idles, and Muse.

== Awards and nominations ==
UK Music Video Awards:

Awards and nominations received for "Spit of You"
| Year | Nominee / work | Award | Result | Ref. |
|---|---|---|---|---|
| 2022 | Philip Barantini and Sam Fender for "Spit of You" | Best Rock Video − UK | Won | |

== Charts ==
Weekly chart performance for "Spit of You"
| Chart (2021) | Peak position |
|---|---|
| UK Singles (Official Charts) | 41 |

== Certifications ==
List of certifications received for "Spit of You"
| Region | Certification | Certified units/sales |
|---|---|---|
| United Kingdom (BPI) | Platinum | 600,000^{‡} |
^{‡} Sales+streaming figures based on certification alone.

== Release history ==
Release history and formats for "Spit of You"
| Region(s) | Date | Format(s) | Label(s) | Ref. |
|---|---|---|---|---|
| Various | 27 September 2021 | Digital download; streaming | Polydor | |
