= Best of the Best (2026 film) =

2026 film by Lena Khan

- Release poster
- Directed by: Lena Khan
- Written by: Hasan Minhaj; Prashanth Venkataramanujam
- Produced by: Jonathan Erlich; Hasan Minhaj; Prashanth Venkataramanujam; Ryan Halprin; Ellen H. Schwartz
- Starring: Maitreyi Ramakrishnan; Priyanka Kedia
- Cinematography: Adam Carboni
- Edited by: Phillip J. Bartell
- Music by: Daniel Rojas
- Production companies: 186K Films; Rideback
- Distributed by: Netflix
- Release date: September 18, 2026
- Running time: 112 min
- Country: United States
- Language: English

Best of the Best is an American comedy dance film directed by Lena Khan from a screenplay by Hasan Minhaj and Prashanth Venkataramanujam about the competitive collegiate Bollywood-fusion dance circuit. The film stars Maitreyi Ramakrishnan and Priyanka Kedia alongside Chaneil Kular, Ankur Rathee, Lilly Singh, Janina Gavankar, and Minhaj.

Lifelong friends Maya and Anjali join UCLA's Bollywood-fusion dance team, and compete in a national dance competition.

Produced by 186K Films and Rideback, it was released on Netflix on September 18, 2026. It received generally positive reviews from critics.

== Plot ==
College freshmen Maya and Anjali adjust to life at UCLA by attending a mixer hosted by the South Asian Student Association (SASA). There, Maya encounters childhood friend Arjun, now a UCLA sophomore. Anjali expresses interest in joining UCLA Agni, the school's Bollywood-fusion dance team, but is daunted by the time commitment. She is attracted to Ronak, the leader of the team.

Maya signs both herself and Anjali up for Agni's tryouts, envisioning herself as a potential lead dancer for the upcoming season and having noticed Anjali's interest in Ronak. They both make the team, which involves intense practice with the primary motivation of defeating Agni's rivals at the national Best of the Best dance competition. When the team is brainstorming a theme and selecting lead dancers for their competition performance, Maya is outspoken about her skepticism of Ronak's idea. She nominates herself to be female lead, encouraging Anjali to try out as well. The final decision is to be made with a vote.

After Maya again goes against Ronak's directions when performing at a fraternity, Ronak expresses his frustration that she is undermining him, without knowing Maya is overhearing the conversation. Despite Maya winning the popular vote, he and other senior members of the team decide to ignore the results and give the lead role to Anjali, citing her likability and 'lead energy'. Although hurt by this, Maya refrains from revealing this information to Anjali, who is very excited to be performing with Ronak, the male lead.

With Arjun's help, Maya builds a prop for use in their dance routine, but adds a fog machine without consulting the team first. Despite Anjali's request to stick to the routine, Maya uses the fog machine during the Best of the Best regional qualifier event, ruining the performance. As a result, the team fails to qualify for the national competition. Ronak cuts Maya from the team for her insubordination, but Anjali convinces him to give her another chance.

To attempt to qualify for the national competition, the team has to raise funds to travel to another regional qualifier. The team participates in a fundraiser held by SASA, auctioning off dates with their members. Maya, who is insecure about her appearance, asks Anjali to bid on her if no one else does, but Anjali forgets about it in the aftermath of the team successfully reaching their goal. Maya feels humiliated when no one bids on her, until Arjun appears and does. He reveals his feelings for her and they begin a relationship.

Due to prioritizing the dance team over her studies, Anjali gets placed on academic probation. Her mother gives her an ultimatum: either improve her grades by the end of term or transfer to community college. She quits the dance team, and Maya is given the female lead role, to Ronak's annoyance.

At the second regional qualifier, tension from the competition causes Maya and Ronak to argue, and she confronts him about his rigging of the lead vote. The two, however, reconcile and express admiration for each other's vision for the team after learning they successfully qualified for nationals. While celebrating, Maya inadvertently reveals Anjali's academic probation and is seen dancing with Ronak on the competition livestream, which both Arjun and Anjali misinterpret.

Anjali confronts Maya about the livestream, and reveals her sense of betrayal over Maya taking the lead role from her. This prompts Maya to reveal the rigged vote and her feelings of insecurity about Anjali always being more popular, culminating in Maya quitting the team as well. Arjun also feels betrayed by how Maya seeks approval from Ronak and ignores the validation he provides.

Without Maya or Anjali, UCLA Agni struggles to prepare for nationals. Maya eventually rejoins the team after apologizing, and Anjali returns as well once her probation is lifted. Ronak allows Maya to pick the theme for their national performance, and suggests Maya and Anjali be the lead performers.

Before the final performance, Maya and Anjali reconcile and reaffirm their friendship. During the performance, a technical difficulty leaves the stage without power, but the two continue the performance and win the competition. Maya and Arjun reconcile afterwards.

== Cast ==
- Maitreyi Ramakrishnan as Maya Krishnaraj
- Priyanka Kedia as Anjali
- Ankur Rathee as Ronak, the leader of UCLA Agni
- Chaneil Kular as Arjun, Maya's boyfriend
- Hasan Minhaj as UCLA Professor Hamza Latif
- Janina Gavankar as Rekha, Anjali's mother

== Production ==
=== Development ===
Originally titled For the Culture and involving Amazon Studios, the project was announced in December 2021 alongside the announcement of Hasan Minhaj's production company, 186K Films. Hasan Minhaj and Prashanth Venkataramanujam co-wrote the story, having previously collaborated on Patriot Act with Hasan Minhaj.

The film's title refers to Best of the Best (BOB), a collegiate South Asian dance competition founded in New York City in 2005 that ran until 2012, featuring dance teams performing Indian dance styles including Bhangra, Raas-Garba and Bollywood fusion. The film also drew on the current collegiate South Asian dance circuit, titled Legends.

While UCLA Agni is not a real team, inspiration was taken from the real-life UCLA Nashaa, the premier competitive team at UCLA and previous winners of Best of the Best. Tying in with the film, the New York Times followed UCLA Nashaa during their 2025–2026 season, to reflect on some of the real-life experiences behind the team.

To ensure an accurate representation of the competitive scene, the writers interviewed several South Asian women who had participated in competitions. By April 2023, Lena Khan had agreed to direct the project.

Singer and composer A. R. Rahman created a track for the movie in homage to Maitreyi Ramakrishnan's Tamil heritage.

=== Casting ===
Maitreyi Ramakrishnan and Priyanka Kedia had been cast by July 2025. In order to prepare for the dance sequences in the film, both actors underwent dance training, up to six times a week, for a period of four months.

=== Filming ===
The project was filmed in Jersey City and Montclair in the state of New Jersey in July 2025.

== Release ==
The film was premiered on September 9, 2026. The film was released by Netflix on September 18, 2026.

== Reception ==
On review aggregator website Rotten Tomatoes, the film holds an approval rating of 83% based on 23 reviews, with an average rating of 6.70/10. Metacritic, which uses a weighted average, assigned the film a score of 71 out of 100, based on six critics, indicating "generally favorable" reviews.

Nandini Balial of RogerEbert.com rated the film 2.5 stars out of 4. While they praised Ramakrishnan's performance and the cultural specificity, they described the story as akin to a Disney Channel Original Movie and lacking "artistic risk." They also critiqued the writing team being male affecting the characterization, writing "stories about brown women should be written by them too." Writing for the New York Times, Chris Azzopardi praised the relationship portrayed by Kedia and Ramakrishnan, but mentioned the plot moving through "familiar steps." Cath Clarke of The Guardian rated the film 3 stars out of 5, similarly citing that there is "absolutely nothing unexpected" about the plot, but praised both the comedy as "whip-fast" and the writers for their portrayal of both Gen-Z and second-generation immigrant behavior.

=== Review bombing ===
During an interview for the film, Ramakrishnan described her ethnic background as Eelam Tamil rather than Sri Lankan Tamil, citing the impact the Sri Lankan civil war had on her upbringing. In the film, her character Maya also states "I'm Tamil, my family is from Sri Lanka," a deliberate change from the script's original wording in which Maya states she is "Tamil Sri Lankan." Ramakrishnan's comments triggered a review bomb campaign against the film instigated by Sri Lankan nationalist pages online, resulting in thousands of negative reviews for the film on IMDb.
