= Accused (2023 film) =

2023 British Thriller film directed by Philip Barantini

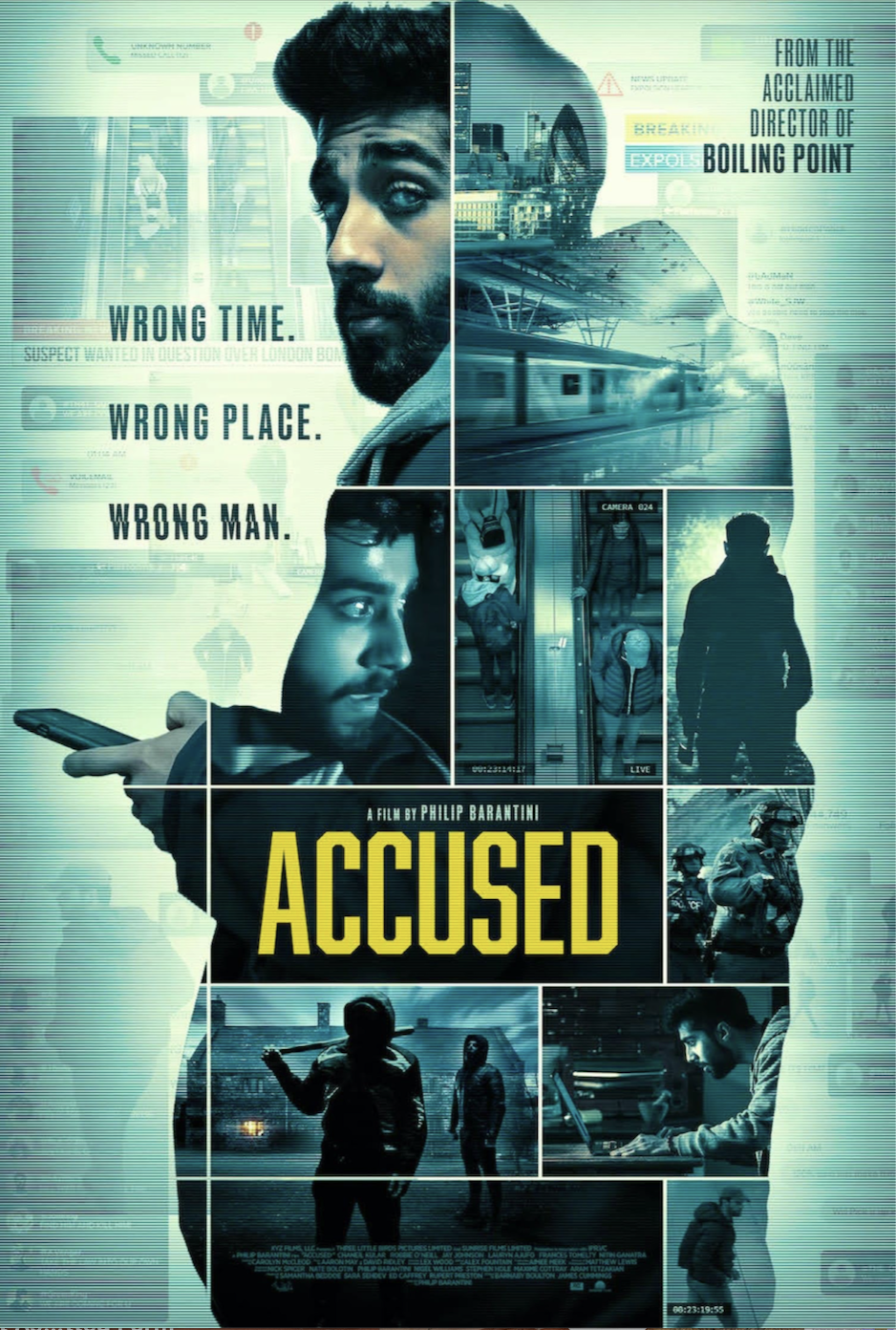
- Promotional poster
- Directed by: Philip Barantini
- Written by: Barnaby Boulton; James Cummings
- Produced by: Samantha Beddoe; Edward Caffrey; Rupert Preston; Sara Sehdev
- Starring: Chaneil Kular
- Cinematography: Matthew Lewis
- Edited by: Alex Fountain
- Music by: Aaron May; David Ridley
- Production companies: Three Little Birds Pictures; It's All Made Up; Sunrise Films; XYZ Films
- Distributed by: Netflix; Tubi
- Release date: 22 September 2023
- Running time: 88 mins
- Language: English

Accused is a 2023 British thriller film directed by Philip Barantini and written by Barnaby Boulton and James Cummings. The film stars Chaneil Kular in his feature film debut. It follows Harri Bhavsar, a young man who is mistakenly identified on social media as the suspect in a London train bombing, triggering an internet witch-hunt that turns into a real-world home invasion.

Accused received generally positive reviews from critics and audiences and topped Netflix charts in several territories, including the United Kingdom.

== Plot ==
Harri Bhavsar, a young British-Asian man living in London, travels to his parents' remote country home to look after the property and their dog, Flynn, while they are on holiday.

During his journey, a bombing occurs at a London train station, killing several people. As news coverage develops, a blurred CCTV image of a suspect is circulated online. An old school classmate of Harri's sees the image and posts on social media that the suspect resembles him. The remark quickly spreads online, leading internet users to falsely identify Harri as the bombing suspect.

Harri becomes aware of the accusation when his personal information is circulated online. Two local vigilantes use this information to track him down and break into his family home, assaulting him during a home invasion. Harri escapes into nearby woodland and seeks help from a neighbour, Mrs Daly. After initially agreeing to call for assistance, Mrs Daly hears speculation about Harri on the radio and instead contacts one of the attackers, turning on him.

Harri kills one of the attackers and returns to his family home to retrieve his parents' car keys so he can leave the area. After starting the car, he is confronted by the remaining attacker and severely beaten. Harri retreats to his childhood treehouse while the attacker pursues him with an axe. As the attacker approaches, the unstable floor collapses, causing him to fall through and become impaled on debris. Harri climbs down and leaves the attacker to die, driving away in his parents' car.

News reports later reveal that the real bomber, Paul Lock, has been apprehended. This is accompanied by a montage showing people deleting their accusatory social media posts, privatising their accounts, and watching footage of the assault on Harri.

One week later, Harri gives an interview about the events. The interview is intercut with images of the aftermath of the attack, including forensic investigators at the house, the damage caused by the home invasion, and the bodies of the attackers and Flynn. Harri appears visibly shaken and is disturbed by notifications repeatedly appearing on his girlfriend Chloe's phone. When the interviewer asks how he feels about what happened, the film cuts to the end credits before he responds.

== Cast ==
- Chaneil Kular as Harri Bhavsar
- Lauryn Ajufo as Chloe
- Nitin Ganatra as Ramesh Bhavsar
- Nila Aalia as Isha Bhavsar
- Frances Tomelty as Mrs Daly
- Robbie O'Neill as Craig, the White Mask intruder
- Jay Johnson as Jack, the Black Mask intruder
- Ben Mars as Jim Jefferson, a news reporter
- Ollie Teague as Paul Lock
- Kimberley Marren as Interview Reporter

== Production ==
Accused was directed by Philip Barantini and written by Barnaby Boulton and James Cummings. Chaneil Kular was attached to the project in September 2020. XYZ Films launched world sales, financed and executive-produced the film. Principal photography began on 28 of February 2022 and concluded by the end of March 2022.

As with some of Barantini's previous work, the film incorporated a mixture of improvisation and workshopping alongside the original script.

== Release ==
The film premiered at the Overlook Film Festival on 31 March 2023 and was then released on Netflix in select territories including the United Kingdom, Canada, New Zealand, Australia, Brazil, South America and the Caribbean on 22 September 2023. In the United States, it was released on Tubi as a Tubi Original on 22 September 2023. The film was also released on Amazon Prime Video in India and Spain.

Accused received theatrical releases in Greece, Spain, Russia and the United Arab Emirates.

== Reception ==
=== Audience viewership ===
Despite limited distribution and marketing, Accused topped Netflix charts in several countries, including the United Kingdom, and peaked at number 7 on Netflix's global movie chart. During its first week on the platform, the film gained over 3.3 million views and was in the top 10 in 23 countries worldwide.

=== Critical reception ===
The film received positive reviews and acclaim from critics and audiences following its release and premiere at the Overlook Film Festival. On the review aggregator website Rotten Tomatoes, the film sits at 100% on the Tomatoemeter based on 15 critic reviews.

Many reviews praised Kular's performance in particular, with Tom Nicholson from Empire Magazine giving it a 4/5 and describing it as "a movie built on a potentially star-making performance from Kular." Matthew Monagle from The Playlist gave the film an 'A-' writing "Kular crosses over with aplomb, carrying the entirety of Barantini's film with very little onscreen support. The actor sells every second of his slow descent into hell and handles a sudden turn to violence with aplomb. It may not be a star-making turn for the actor, but it is undoubtedly the film that will put Kular on the radar of every Hollywood casting director."

Benjamin Lee gave the film 3 out of 5 in The Guardian, stating "It's a tough sit for the first half but our anxiety is strangely alleviated when hateful tweets transform into hateful violence, the film faltering when it turns into a more conventional home invasion thriller. It's not ineffective exactly (the violence is potently nasty) but there's just something a little flattening as scenes of a more familiar panic seep in, the film becoming more like so many others before it, tension de-escalating by the minute. It's relatively short, just shy of 90 minutes, but it perhaps would have benefited from being turned into a tighter, hour-long TV drama, playing almost like a grounded episode of Black Mirror. Before it reaches and surpasses the boiling point though, Accused packs one hell of a punch."

The film holds a score of 3.2 on Letterboxd indicating favourable reviews amongst audiences.

=== Box office ===
The film grossed a total of $133,284 from its release in Spain and Russia.
