= Get You Down =

Single by Sam Fender

from the album Seventeen Going Under
- Released: 8 September 2021
- Recorded: Grouse Lodge, Ireland
- Length: 4:23
- Label: Polydor
- Songwriter: Sam Fender
- Producer: Bramwell Bronte

Sam Fender singles chronology
"Aye" (2021)	"Get You Down" (2021)	"Spit of You" (2021)

Music video
- "Get You Down" on YouTube

"Get You Down" is a song by English singer-songwriter Sam Fender. It was released on 8 September 2021 by Polydor Records as the second single from his second studio album Seventeen Going Under. The song peaked at number 48 on the UK Singles Chart. The song is featured on the soundtrack of FIFA 22.

== Background ==
The song was originally recorded in 2019. When speaking to NME just prior to the track's release, Fender explained that its lyrics look "at how [my] insecurity tore apart my relationships, and my last relationship in particular." He continued: “I think it’s one of those records that’s kinda like a slow burner, but it’s a monster.”

== Music video ==
The song's music video was released on 22 October 2021. Directed by Hector Dockrill, Fender plays the main role, with actress Monica Armario playing Fender's love interest. The video is set at a racetrack, and as Rolling Stone explains, it opens to "scenes set in a caravan, the visuals show Fender riding around the racetrack and arguing with [Armario] in the car, before getting injured in an accident."

The following year it was nominated for 'Best Colour Grading in a Video' at the 2022 UK Music Video Awards, although it ultimately lost to "Point and Kill" by Little Simz featuring Obongjayar.

== Track Listing ==
Digital download and streaming
No.	Title	Length
1.	"Get You Down"	4:23
2.	"Get You Down" (Edit)	3:40
3.	"The Kitchen" (Live)	3:40

== Charts ==
Chart (2021)	Peak position
UK Singles (OCC)	48
Switzerland Airplay (Schweizer Hitparade)	82

== Certifications ==
Region	Certification	Certified units/sales
United Kingdom (BPI)	Silver	200,000^{‡}
^{‡} Sales+streaming figures based on certification alone.

== Release history ==
Region	Date	Format	Label
United Kingdom	8 September 2021	Digital download; streaming	Polydor

== Awards and nominations ==
Award	Year	Category	Result	Ref.
UK Music Video Awards	2022	Best Colour Grading in a Video	Nominated	
