= The Death of Bunny Munro (TV series) =

British television series

- Promotional poster
- Genre: Dark comedy
- Based on: The Death of Bunny Munro by Nick Cave
- Written by: Pete Jackson
- Directed by: Isabella Eklöf
- Starring: Matt Smith; Sarah Greene; Rafael Mathé
- Composers: Nick Cave; Warren Ellis
- Country of origin: United Kingdom
- Original language: English
- No. of series: 1
- No. of episodes: 6

Production
- Executive producers: Ed Macdonald; Emily Harrison; Petra Fried; Wim De Greef; Pete Jackson; Isabella Eklöf; Matt Smith; Nick Cave
- Producer: Matthew Mulot
- Cinematography: Nadim Carlsen
- Editors: Luke Dunkley; John Dwelly; Tony Kearns
- Production companies: Clerkenwell Films; Sky Studios

Original release
- Network: Sky Atlantic
- Release: 20 November – 11 December 2025

The Death of Bunny Munro is a British dark comedy television miniseries based on the 2009 novel by Nick Cave. It stars Matt Smith, Sarah Greene, and Rafael Mathé in main roles, with Smith and Cave also serving as executive producers. The series premiered on 20 November 2025 on Sky Atlantic.

== Synopsis ==
In 2003, a middle-aged salesman (Smith) takes his son on a road trip around Sussex after his wife's suicide at the same time as a serial killer is inhabiting the area.

== Cast and characters ==
=== Main ===
- Matt Smith as Bunny Munro
- Sarah Greene as Libby
- Rafael Mathé as Bunny Junior

=== Supporting ===
- Robert Glenister as Geoffrey
- Johann Myers as Poodle
- Lindsay Duncan as Doris Pennington
- Elizabeth Berrington as Charlotte Parnovar
- Alice Feetham as Yvonne
- David Threlfall as Bunny Munro Snr
- Montserrat Lombard as Esme

== Episodes ==
No.	Title	Directed by	Written by	Original release date
1	"Family Man"	Isabella Eklöf	Pete Jackson	20 November 2025
2	"Salesman"	Isabella Eklöf	Pete Jackson	27 November 2025
3	"Cocksman"	Isabella Eklöf	Pete Jackson	4 December 2025
4	"Con Man"	Isabella Eklöf	Pete Jackson	4 December 2025
5	"Dead Man"	Isabella Eklöf	Pete Jackson	11 December 2025
6	"Showman"	Isabella Eklöf	Pete Jackson	11 December 2025

== Production ==
=== Development ===
Nick Cave has said that at least four different production companies tried to adapt his novel into a film or television series but: "No one would play the character!"

In May 2023, Cave revealed that an adaptation of the book was in the works. The six-part series was announced in November 2023 with Matt Smith cast in the titular role, created in the 2009 book written by Cave. The production by Clerkenwell Films and Sky Studios has a script adaptation by Pete Jackson. Cave is executive producer, along with Smith. It is directed by Isabella Eklöf. Sky Studios' Manpreet Dosanjh, Clerkenwell's Petra Fried, Ed Macdonald and Emily Harrison, Jackson and Eklöf are also executive producers on the series whilst Matthew Mulot is the series producer.

=== Casting ===
In January 2024, a casting call for a nine-year-old Bunny Junior was issued. In December 2024, newcomer Rafael Mathé was cast in the role while the rest of the cast included Sarah Greene, Johann Myers, Robert Glenister, Alice Feetham, Montserrat Lombard, David Threlfall, Lindsay Duncan, and Elizabeth Berrington

=== Filming ===
Principal photography began in May 2024 in the south of England. Filming locations included Worthing, Eastbourne, Shoreham-by-Sea, Brighton, and Hove, all in Sussex. Filming wrapped by 16 August 2024.

== Release ==
The Death of Bunny Munro premiered on 20 November 2025 on Sky Atlantic and Now.

== Reception ==
On the review aggregator website Rotten Tomatoes, 83% of 18 critics' reviews are positive. The critics consensus states: "Though the main character may be repellent, Matt Smith makes The Death of Bunny Munro a deviously good time with enough sex, intrigue and genuine drama to be a worthy return on investment."

Writing for The Guardian, Lucy Mangan gave the series five stars: "All the bleak tenderness from the... novel makes it into this heartbreaking screen adaptation of a father-and-son road trip where the dad relentlessly pursues sex. It will undo you".

Writing for Uncut, Peter Watts gave the series four stars, its success resting on Matt Smith's performance: "Bunny's pathetic fecklessness would be bad enough if it hadn’t contributed to his wife's suicide, but Smith provides just enough impish charm to keep the audience invested." Largely agreeing, also assigning the series four stars, David Opie placed emphasis on Buddy's relationship with Junior in his review for Empire.

== Accolades ==
Smith was nominated for Leading Actor and Mathé for Supporting Actor at the British Academy Television Awards.
