= Hounded (2022 film) =

2022 British crime horror movie

- Directed by: Tommy Boulding
- Written by: Ray Bogdanovich and Dean Lines
- Starring: Samantha Bond; Nobuse Jr; Malachi Pullar-Latchman; Hannah Traylen; Ross Coles
- Production company: Fiction Films
- Distributed by: Saban Films
- Release date: October 21, 2022
- Running time: 94 minutes
- Country: United Kingdom
- Language: English
- Box office: $89,593

Hounded, also released as Hunted, is a 2022 British crime horror film written by Ray Bogdanovich and Dean Lines, directed by Tommy Boulding, and starring Samantha Bond.

== Plot ==
Motivated by a combination of greed and economic need, a group of young urban thieves, led by Leon, target and steal artworks to demand from country estates. Convinced to undertake another heist, Leon and the gang aim to steal from Lady Redwick, but are captured in the attempt. The next day, let go after being covered in fox urine, the gang find themselves being hunted by Lady Redwick and her fellow gentry.

== Cast ==
- Samantha Bond as Katherine Redwick
- Nobuse Jr as Leon
- Malachi Pullar-Latchman as Chaz
- Hannah Traylen as Vix
- Ross Coles as Tod
- Larry Lamb as Gregory
- James Lance as Hugo Redwick
- Nick Moran as Mallory
- Louis Walwyn as Miles Redwick
- James Faulkner as Remington Redwick

== Release ==
=== Box office ===
Hounded had a limited release to theatres in October 2022, achieving a box office total of $89,593.

=== Critical reception ===
On Rotten Tomatoes it has a 63% rating based on reviews from 8 critics. The film received a 2* review in The Guardian. Critic Phil Hoad highlighted the interaction and conflict between the different socio-economic groups bringing a "certain vindictive thrill", however summed up by stating Hounded was "too caricatural to hit hard as satire". Julian Roman writing for MovieWeb, called it a "failed attempt at murderous social commentary".

Noel Murray of the Los Angeles Times drew a comparison between the film and previous movie The Hunt, but highlighted Hounded as being "less ambitious", although concluded that it is "ideal for anyone who enjoys the sound of tortured screams in a bucolic English countryside". Kat Hughes of The Hollywood News gave it a 4 out of 5 rating and called it "An excellent dramatisation of the United Kingdom’s current broken societal and economic gaps, Hounded presents a very pertinent fictional take on class war".
