= Lena Khan =

Film director and writer

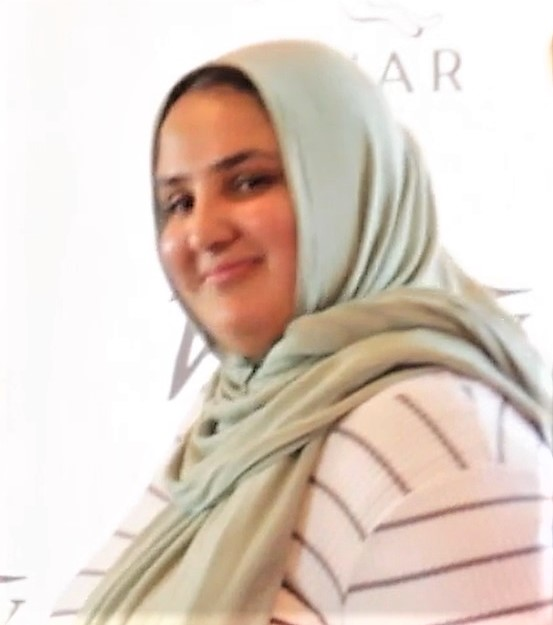
- Lena Khan at Carmel Film Festival in 2016
- Occupation: Director
- Years active: 2016–present

Lena Khan is a film director, producer, and writer.

== Early life and career ==
Khan was born in Canada to Indian parents. Khan grew up in Rancho Cucamonga, California before graduating from UCLA's film school. She is a Muslim. Khan has also written and directed short films. Her directorial debut was The Tiger Hunter, a film partially based on her grandfather who was a tiger hunter. Her second film, Flora & Ulysses, was released in February 2021. Khan was on the 2020 Alice Initiative's "List of Emerging Female Directors".

Khan directed Best of the Best, which was released on Netflix in 2026.

== Filmography ==
=== Film ===
Director

- The Tiger Hunter (2016) (Also writer and producer)
- Flora & Ulysses (2021)
- Best of the Best (2026)

Executive producer

- Stranger at the Gate (2022)

=== Television ===
Year	Title	Notes
2021-2023	Never Have I Ever	4 episodes
2022	The Mysterious Benedict Society	Episode "Commitment to All Things Cozy"
