= The Tiger Hunter =

- Directed by: Lena Khan
- Written by: Lena Khan; Sameer Gardezi
- Produced by: Nazia Khan; Lena Khan; Megha Kadakia
- Starring: Danny Pudi; Jon Heder; Rizwan Manji; Karen David; Iqbal Theba; Sam Page; Parvesh Cheena; Michael McMillian; Kevin Pollak; Kay Kay Menon
- Cinematography: Patrice Cochet
- Edited by: Dan Bush; Jon Berry
- Music by: Amy Correia; Paul Masvidal
- Production company: Sneaky Sneaky Films
- Release dates: April 21, 2016 (LAAPFF); September 22, 2017
- Running time: 94 minutes
- Country: United States
- Language: English

The Tiger Hunter is a 2016 American comedy film directed by Lena Khan, written by Khan and Sameer Gardezi, and starring Danny Pudi, Jon Heder, Rizwan Manji, Karen David, Iqbal Theba, Samuel Page, Parvesh Cheena, Michael McMillian, and Kevin Pollak. The film had its world premiere at the Los Angeles Asian Pacific Film Festival on April 21, 2016 and opened in fall of 2018 in theaters across the United States.

== Plot summary ==
A young Indian man, the son of a beloved tiger hunter, comes to Chicago in 1979 on a quest for success. Trained as an engineer, Sami Malik's dream is initially thwarted and he must take a temporary job as a lowly draftsman in an electronics company. He moves in with several other under-employed engineers and a Pakistani chef (Babu Rahman) who have emigrated to the U.S. His misfit roommates concoct an elaborate farce in order for him to romance his childhood crush, Ruby Iqbal.

Sami meets Alex Womack, the son of the company's head (Frank Womak), who has eschewed corporate life and prefers to take Polaroid photographs of depressed persons. Alex helps Sami in his efforts to succeed, encouraging him to work on the company's biggest current project—creating a microwave oven that can properly heat frozen food without blowing up. After several failures, Sami enlists the help of his roommate engineers. They succeed in building a non-exploding microwave that also heats frozen food properly and present it to the company head, just in time for him to make a deal to manufacture it. Frank is so grateful for the help that he gives them all jobs.

Sami fails to impress Ruby when she and her strict father visit Chicago on a tour of the U.S., but at the film's conclusion he, Alex, and Babu are seen driving to California to catch up with her and plead his case again, now that he is a gainfully employed engineer.

== Cast ==
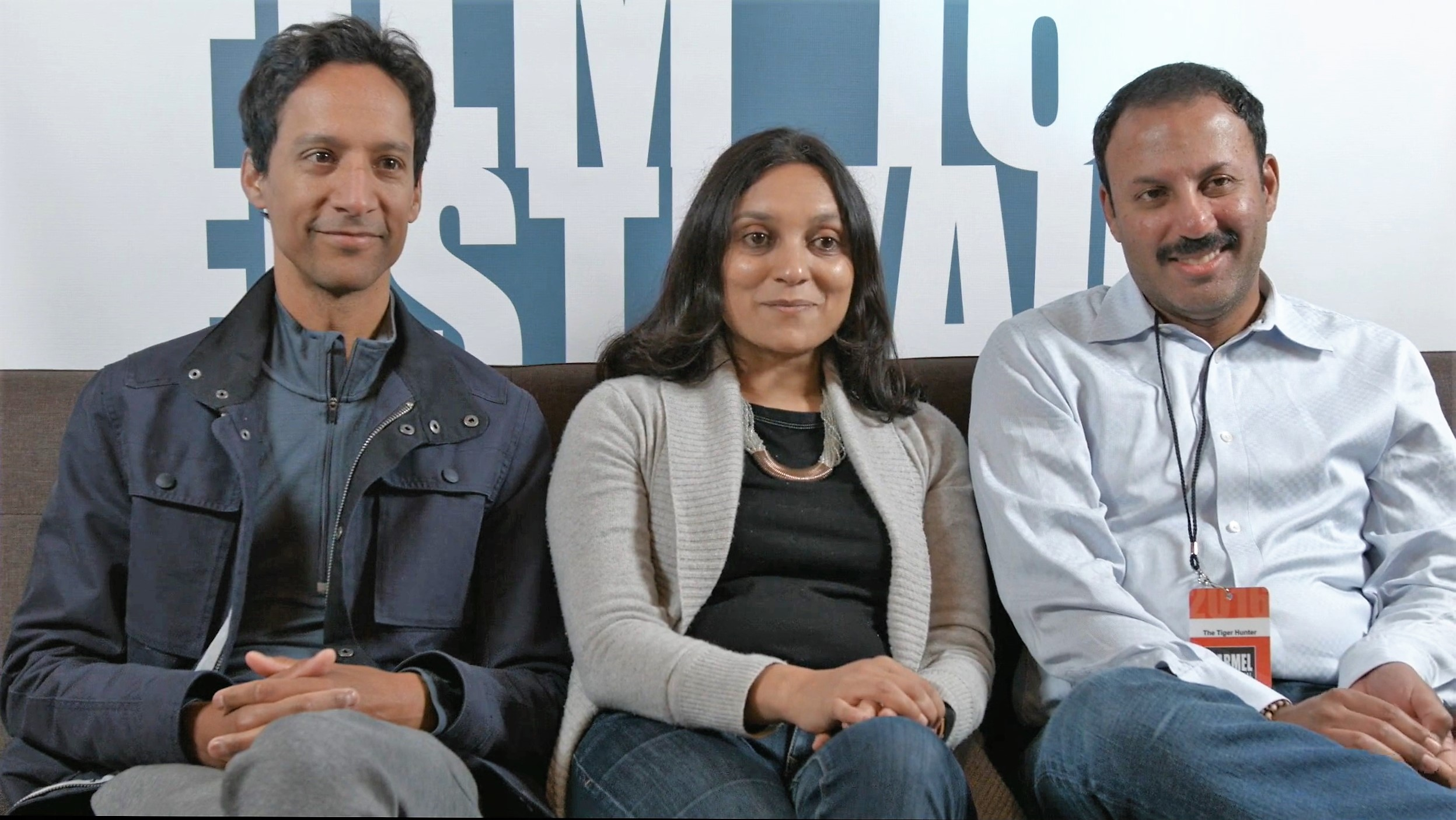
Left to right: actor Danny Pudi, producer Megha Kadakia, actor Rizwan Manji discuss The Tiger Hunter at Carmel Film Festival in 2016

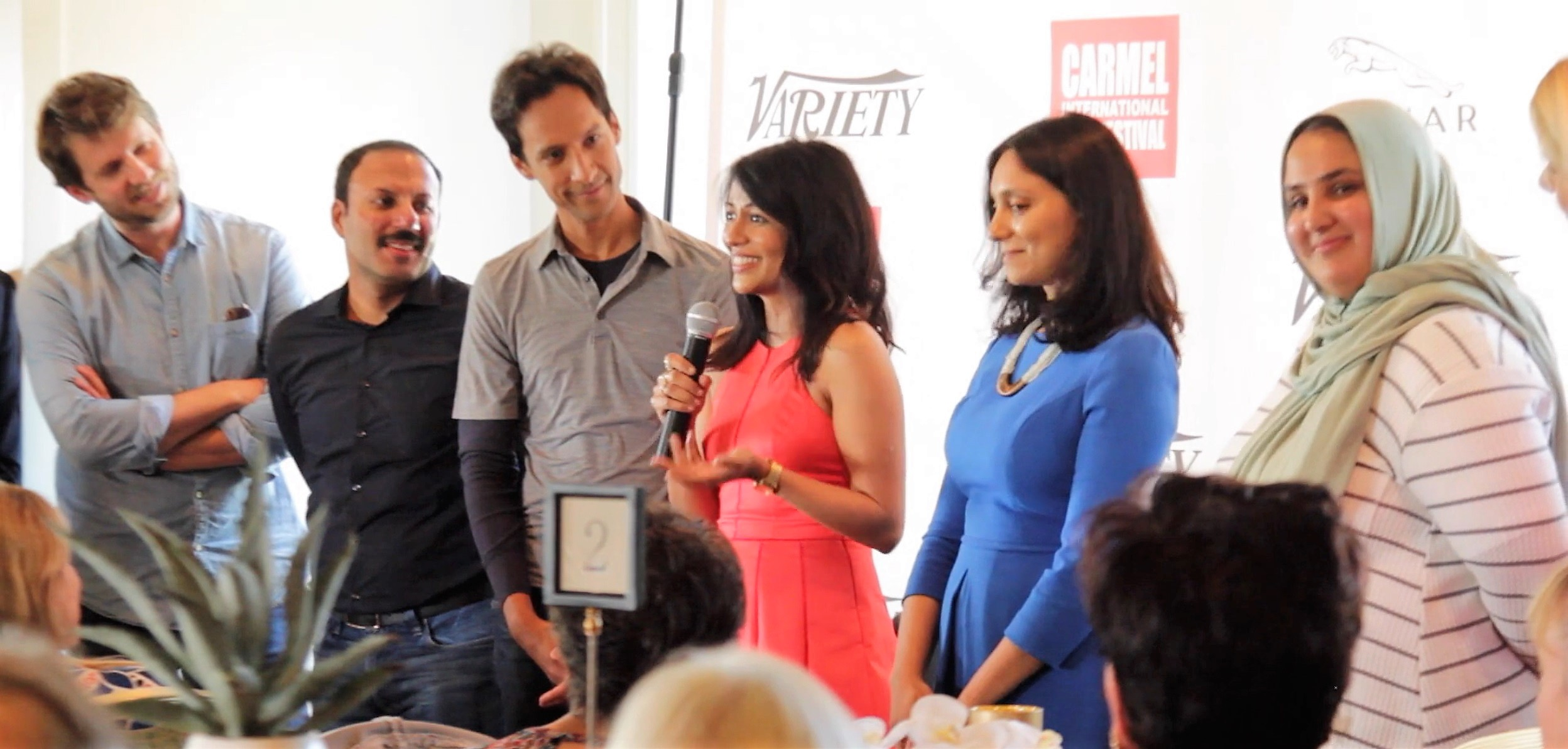
Left to right: actors Jon Heder, Rizwan Manji, Danny Pudi, Karen David, producer Megha Kadakia, director and writer Lena Khan discuss The Tiger Hunter at Carmel Film Festival in 2016

- Danny Pudi as Sami Malik
- Kay Kay Menon as Azeem Malik, Sami's father
- Jon Heder as Alex Womack
- Rizwan Manji as Babu Rahman
- Karen David as Ruby Iqbal
- Iqbal Theba as General Iqbal
- Kevin Pollak as Mr. Frank Womack
- Samuel Page as Kenneth Porter
- Michael McMillian as Winston
- Anand Desai-Barochia as Vikram
- Samba Schutte as Kareem
- Patricia Belcher as Sandy

== Production ==
In January 2013, it was announced that Lena Khan would be directing a comedy film titled The Tiger Hunter from her own script. The film was funded through a Kickstarter campaign. In August 2014, it was confirmed that the cast included Danny Pudi, Jon Heder, Iqbal Theba, Kevin Pollak, Karen David, and Samuel Page.

== Release ==
The film released in fall of 2018 across the United States, in over 50 cities. It was distributed by Regal and Shout! Factory, and soon became available On Demand and on Netflix in North America and South Asia. It is available in various countries across the world in different formats.

The film had its world premiere at the Los Angeles Asian Pacific Film Festival on April 21, 2016.

The film was received positively, with strong reviews in outlets such as The New York Times and Los Angeles Times. It received positive reviews from 78% critics on the review aggregator Rotten Tomatoes.
