= The Revenge Club =

British television series

- Created by: Gabbie Asher
- Based on: The Othello Club by J.D. Pennington
- Screenplay by: Matt Jones; Adam Usden
- Directed by: Tim Kirkby; Daniel O’Hara
- Starring: Martin Compston; Aimee-Ffion Edwards; Meera Syal; Sharon Rooney; Douglas Henshall; Chaneil Kular; Amit Shah; Niamh Walsh
- Music by: Paul Hartnoll
- Country of origin: United Kingdom
- Original language: English
- No. of series: 1
- No. of episodes: 6

Production
- Executive producers: Gabbie Asher; J.D. Pennington; Alison Jackson; Jess Connell
- Producer: Margot Gavan Duffy
- Running time: 51 minutes
- Production companies: Gaumont; Fremantle

Original release
- Network: Paramount+
- Release: 12 December 2025

The Revenge Club is a 2025 six-part thriller television series that is an adaptation of the novel The Othello Club by J.D. Pennington. It was released on Paramount+ on 12 December 2025.

== Premise ==
Strangers who have bonded at a divorcees support group begin to wonder if they can deal out retribution for each other.

== Cast ==
- Martin Compston as Calum Baird
- Aimee-Ffion Edwards as Emily Hunter
- Meera Syal as Rita Eggleston
- Sharon Rooney as Rachel Koffman
- Douglas Henshall as Steve Williams
- Chaneil Kular as Tej Jogia
- Amit Shah as Malcolm Ray
- Niamh Walsh as Bex
- Owen Teale as Jim Eggleston
- Taru Devani as Nani
- Aoife Kennan as DS Rosa Hawkes
- Rob Malone as DS Leon Thompson
- Wil Coban as Dan Marshall
- Christina Bennington as Charlotte Grimes
- Eoin Duffy as Jack Jackson

== Production ==
The series was commissioned by Paramount+ and produced by Gaumont and Fremantle as an adaptation of The Othello Club by J.D. Pennington. The series was created by Gabbie Asher with episodes written by Matt Jones and Adam Usden. Both Pennington and Asher are executive producers alongside Alison Jackson and Jess Connell. Series producer is Margot Gavan Duffy. The series is directed by Tim Kirkby and Daniel O’Hara.

The cast is led by Martin Compston, Aimee-Ffion Edwards, Meera Syal with Sharon Rooney, Douglas Henshall, Chaneil Kular and Amit Shah.

Principal photography was underway in June 2025.

== Release ==
The six-part series was released on Paramount+ on 12 December 2025.

== Reception ==
Lucy Mangan in The Guardian gave the show three stars and said it had "enough to keep you hooked even after you realise too many of the characters are ciphers, the main action is preposterous but that the brutal misery of divorce is somehow perfectly evoked and underlies every moment. It makes you want to cry even as you laugh in disbelief at the shenanigans unfolding”. James Jackson in The Times praised the cast and said the series "grabs you from the off as an almost infuriatingly watchable bit of black-hearted fun" with "engagingly contrasting characters, bouncing off each other as if in a pinball machine of retribution".
