= Devil's Playground (2010 film) =

2010 film by Mark McQueen

- Directed by: Mark McQueen
- Written by: Bart Ruspoli
- Produced by: Freddie Hutton-Mills; Bart Ruspoli; Jonathan Sothcott
- Starring: Danny Dyer; Craig Fairbrass; MyAnna Buring; Jaime Murray
- Cinematography: Jason Shepherd
- Edited by: Rob Hall
- Music by: James Edward Barker
- Production companies: Black & Blue Films; HMR Films; Widescreen; Intandem
- Distributed by: E1 Entertainment
- Release date: 3 October 2010 (Gorezone)
- Running time: 92 minutes
- Country: United Kingdom
- Language: English

Devil's Playground is a British horror film directed by Mark McQueen and starring Craig Fairbrass. Intandem Films has the worldwide rights to the film, which was produced by Freddie Hutton-Mills, Bart Ruspoli and Jonathan Sothcott.

== Plot ==
After the final stage of human testing goes horribly awry, the test subjects of the fictional pharmaceutical company N-Gen become violently ill. As the side effects worsen, the test subjects become increasingly violent until they are little but marauding beasts. Worse yet, their bites are infectious and in short order London is overrun with hordes of bloodthirsty monsters. Cole, a mercenary for N-Gen and a hardened killer, is searching for Angela Mills, the only hope of a cure for this plague which threatens the globe. As the only test subject who did not suffer side effects, her immunity holds the key to preventing a worldwide apocalypse. Cole's mission is complicated by chaos, continual attacks by the infected, and the virus slowly overtaking his own body.

== Cast ==
- Danny Dyer as Joe
- Craig Fairbrass as Cole
- MyAnna Buring as Angela Mills
- Jaime Murray as Lavinia
- Shane Taylor as Geoffrey
- Bart Ruspoli as Matt Mills
- Craig Conway as Steve
- Lisa McAllister as Kate
- Alistair Petrie as Andy Billing
- Colin Salmon as Peter White
- Sean Pertwee as Rob
- Del Henney as Dr. Michael Brooke

== Production ==
Shooting began on 30 November 2009 at Elstree Studios.

== Release ==
Devil's Playground premiered at the Gorezone Film Festival on 3 October 2010. Vivendi released it on DVD and video on demand on 11 October 2011.

== Reception ==
Leslie Felperin of Variety called it "unoriginal but watchable". Mark L. Miller of AICN wrote that it is "heavy on action and surprisingly textured when it comes to story." William Bibbiani of CraveOnline called it a forgettable and "completely nondescript" knock-off of 28 Days Later. Kayley Viteo criticised the rapid shifts in tone and called it a caricature of 28 Days Later. Peter Dendle wrote that the film is "largely familiar, but the execution is competent and convincing".
