= The Cursed (2021 film) =

2021 film by Sean Ellis

- Theatrical release poster
- Directed by: Sean Ellis
- Written by: Sean Ellis
- Produced by: Pete Shilaimon; Mickey Liddell; Sean Ellis
- Starring: Boyd Holbrook; Kelly Reilly; Alistair Petrie; Roxane Duran; Áine Rose Daly
- Cinematography: Sean Ellis
- Edited by: Yorgos Mavropsaridis; Richard Mettler
- Music by: Robin Foster
- Production company: LD Entertainment
- Distributed by: LD Entertainment (United States and Canada); Universal Pictures; Focus Features (International)
- Release dates: January 30, 2021 (Sundance); February 18, 2022 (United States)
- Running time: 113 minutes
- Countries: United States; France
- Language: English
- Box office: $4.6 million

The Cursed is a 2021 gothic horror film written, directed and co-produced by Sean Ellis. The film stars Boyd Holbrook, Kelly Reilly, Alistair Petrie, and Roxane Duran. Its plot follows a 19th-century village in rural France that is menaced by a werewolf.

An international co-production of the United States and France, The Cursed premiered at the 2021 Sundance Film Festival under the title Eight for Silver. It was released in the U.S. on February 18, 2022, by LD Entertainment. It received generally positive reviews from critics.

== Plot ==
During the Battle of the Somme (1916), a wounded French captain is brought into a medical tent with three bullet wounds to his abdomen. During surgery, an army surgeon discovers and removes an additional fourth bullet made of silver and not of German design.

In c. 1881 (35 years before the battle), in rural France, brutal land baron Seamus Laurent leads a slaughter of a Romani clan who have settled upon his land and made a disputed claim to it. Having foreseen their impending danger, the elderly Romani leader cast a set of silver dentures in the form of a wolf's fangs for their protection. After the slaughter, the clan leader and a male Romani are captured, the latter being dismembered and erected as a scarecrow to serve as a warning to other Romani, whilst the Romani leader is buried alive with the silver fangs clutched in her grasp.

Soon after, the townspeople, including Seamus' children Edward and Charlotte, are plagued by nightmares of the scarecrow and the silver fangs. While playing one day, farm boy Timmy reveals to the other children he knows the location of the scarecrow. Upon arriving at the scarecrow and having sworn the others to secrecy, Timmy is overcome with the urge to dig up the silver fangs. Edward attempts to stop him, but Timmy becomes possessed and places the fangs in his mouth, subsequently biting Edward's throat as the other children flee in terror. Seamus quickly recovers the wounded Edward whilst Timmy is nowhere to be found. A doctor concludes that Edward was attacked by a wild animal, as Edward grows ill. After Charlotte awakes to Edward's screams during the night and finds him ensnared by wood-like vines emerging from his body, Edward disappears into the night.

Charlotte goes to the local church to pray and encounters Timmy, who claims he has no memory of what happened after donning the fangs. When Charlotte asks Timmy what he did with the silver fangs, he reveals he hid them in the church. When Charlotte's maid Anais discovers them, Timmy flees. As Timmy runs into the forest, he is pursued by an unseen beast into an abandoned shack where he is soon slaughtered. Widowed pathologist John McBride visits the town, seeking information on the traveling Roma. He accompanies police lieutenant Alfred Molière, who has been called by Seamus to find Edward. Meeting with Seamus, the pair find Timmy's mauled body. Molière, believing Edward's disappearance means he has likely been killed, departs, but John offers to stay to assist Seamus. The next night, Seamus' manor is visited by a strange wolf-like beast that unsuccessfully tries to gain entry.

Soon, three townspeople are attacked by the beast. Two are killed but the third, Anne-Marie, is critically maimed and manages to return to the town. Upon hearing Anne-Marie survived her attack but was bitten, John rapidly heads to the town, but is too late to prevent an already transforming Anne-Marie from escaping. Luring the Anne-Marie beast, John manages to trap and kill the creature, bringing the corpse to Seamus and performing an autopsy. Cutting open the creature reveals Anne-Marie, screaming in a murderous rage. John insists that she cannot be saved and orders a villager to shoot and kill her. John explains that the infection causes a victim to become one of the creatures, with Seamus realising that Edward has suffered the same fate. John reveals to Seamus' wife Isabelle that his wife and daughter were killed by a similar beast - he was investigating the Romani as they pronounced the "curse" on the land had been fulfilled. Isabelle also reveals that Seamus was the orchestrator of the Romani massacre and so is the target of the curse, along with his kin.

Charlotte informs John of the silver fangs' location, which he melts down into four silver bullets. The first beast attacks and bites Seamus' maid Anais, but withdraws as Seamus returns from a failed hunting party. Anais bandages and hides her wounds. John notices evidence of Anais' attack but falls into an argument with Seamus about his actions before he can pursue the maid. Seamus investigates a noise coming from Anais' room and is ambushed by a transformed Anais, knocking his candlestick over and setting the manor ablaze. Seamus successfully kills the Anais creature but not before he is bitten. Knowing that he is doomed to transform and attack his family, Seamus immolates himself in front of John. Retrieving Charlotte and Isabelle, John leads them to the church where the other townspeople have taken shelter from the attacks.

During the night after everyone has fallen asleep, Isabelle goes to pray and hears Edward's voice calling to her from outside the barricaded church doors. A grief-stricken Isabelle lifts the barricade, letting the rampaging beast into the church where it proceeds to massacre the townspeople. John attempts to shoot the beast with a silver bullet, but Isabelle intentionally stands between his aim and the beast, calling out to the transformed Edward. As the raging beast mauls her, John has no other choice but to shoot through Isabelle into the beast. Both fall to the floor, and as Isabelle dies, Edward reverts to his human form. Isabelle dies embracing her weeping, reanimated human son.

With both their parents dead and their manor destroyed, John takes care of Edward and Charlotte, who returns to John the three remaining silver bullets from the attack in the church. It is revealed that the mortally wounded French captain is the adult Edward, having had the silver bullet lodged inside him ever since he was shot as a creature/child in the church. With the silver bullet removed, Edward dies on the operating table. Some time later, an adult Charlotte visits an elderly bed-ridden John, returning the fourth silver bullet.

== Cast ==
- Boyd Holbrook as John McBride
- Kelly Reilly as Isabelle Laurent
- Alistair Petrie as Seamus Laurent
- Roxane Duran as Anais
- Nigel Betts as Alfred Molière
- Stuart Bowman as Saul
- Simon Kunz as Mr. Griffin
- Amelia Crouch as Charlotte
- Max Mackintosh as Edward
- Tommy Rodger as Timmy
- Áine Rose Daly as Anne-Marie

== Production ==
The film was shot in the Charente region of western France. It was filmed on 35 mm film with anamorphic lenses. In an interview with Variety, director Sean Ellis stated, "We tried to do as much of it in camera as possible, because I always think it looks better."

Ellis has said that the film is a spin on the classic werewolf mythos, standing as a metaphor for addiction in modern-day society, and that it "infused a new approach for the mythology of it all because you're not changing into something, you're actually becoming a prisoner of it".

== Release ==
The film had its world premiere at the 2021 Sundance Film Festival on January 30, 2021 and was released in the United States on February 18, 2022. The film was digitally released on March 15, 2022, followed by a Blu-ray and DVD release on May 10, 2022.

== Reception ==
=== Box office ===
In the United States and Canada, the film was released alongside Uncharted and Dog during the Presidents' Day four-day holiday. The Cursed earned $1.8 million in its first three days and $2 million in its first four days, finishing ninth at the box office. The film dropped out of the box office top ten in its second weekend with $1.1 million.

=== Critical response ===
On the review aggregator website Rotten Tomatoes, 71% of 128 critics' reviews are positive, with an average rating of 6.4/10. The website's consensus reads: "For a werewolf movie, The Cursed is frustratingly lacking in killer instinct—but its intriguing additions to well-worn mythology add some necessary bite." Metacritic, which uses a weighted average, assigned the film a score of 62 out of 100, based on 24 critics, indicating "generally favorable" reviews. Audiences polled by PostTrak gave the film a 58% positive score, with 36% saying they would definitely recommend it.

== Accolades ==
Award ceremony	Category	Recipient	Result	Ref.
Gérardmer	Best Film	The Cursed	Nominated	
Sitges Film Festival	Best Motion Picture	The Cursed	Nominated	
Sitges Film Festival	Best Director	Sean Ellis	Nominated	
Sitges Film Festival	Best Screenplay	Sean Ellis	Nominated	
Camerimage	Golden Frog for Outstanding Cinematography	Sean Ellis	Nominated	
