= Áine Rose Daly =

British actress

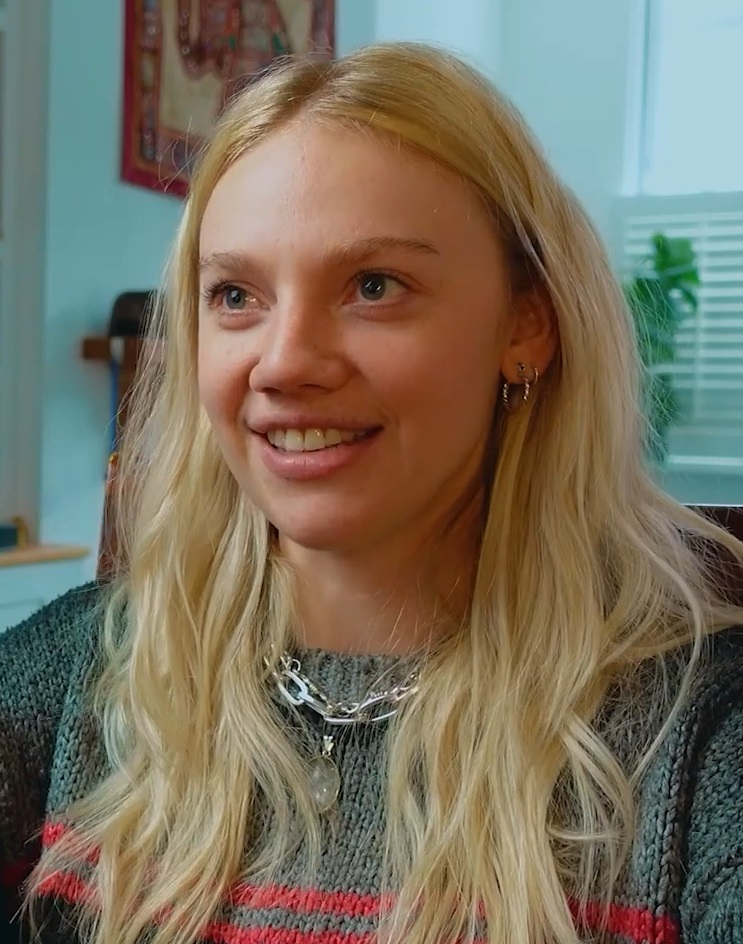
- Daly in 2024
- Born: Jersey
- Occupation: Actress

Áine Rose Daly is a British actress. On television, she is known for her roles in Tom Clancy's Jack Ryan (2018) and Hanna (2019–2021). Her films include Boiling Point and The Cursed (both 2021).

== Early life ==
Daly was born to Irish parents on the channel island Jersey. She trained in the Stanislavski and Meisner methods, at the Identity School of Acting in London.

== Career ==
She played Annabelle Schenkel in the Amazon Prime series Tom Clancy's Jack Ryan in 2018, and in 2020 she appeared as Sandy (previously known as 'Girl 242') in the second and third seasons of Hanna. She appeared as a waitress in Philip Barantini's one-shot film Boiling Point, which premiered at the 55th Karlovy Vary International Film Festival in August 2021 and released in British cinemas in 2022.

In 2021 she appeared in the American-French gothic horror The Cursed. She is also a singer/songwriter. She has released the singles "Miles" and "Places", the latter dealing with issues surrounding mental health.

In 2023, Daly reprised her role as Robyn in the spin-off series of Boiling Point.
