= Seventeen Going Under =

Studio album by Sam Fender
- Released: 8 October 2021
- Recorded: December 2020 – February 2021
- Studios: Grouse Lodge, County Westmeath, Ireland
- Genres: Americana; British trad rock; heartland rock; indie rock; pop rock
- Length: 45:17
- Label: Polydor
- Producer: Bramwell Bronte

Sam Fender chronology
Hypersonic Missiles (2019)	Seventeen Going Under (2021)	People Watching (2025)

Singles from Seventeen Going Under
- 1. "Seventeen Going Under" Released: 7 July 2021; 2. "Aye" Released: 20 August 2021; 3. "Get You Down" Released: 8 September 2021; 4. "Spit of You" Released: 27 September 2021; 5. "Long Way Off" Released: 8 October 2021; 6. "The Dying Light" Released: 14 December 2021; 7. "Getting Started" Released: 17 April 2022

Singles from Deluxe Edition
- 1. "Alright" Released: 15 July 2022; 2. "Wild Grey Ocean" Released: 25 October 2022; 3. "Little Bull of Blithe" Released: 9 December 2022

Seventeen Going Under is the second studio album by English musician Sam Fender. The album was released on 8 October 2021 through Polydor Records. The album explores Fender's upbringing and how it has impacted who he is today, exploring both his outward nihilism as well as his internal self-examination. Four singles were released ahead of the album: the title track, "Aye", "Get You Down", and "Spit of You".

The album received universal acclaim from music critics and was also a commercial success becoming Fender's second number one album in the UK Albums Chart and Scottish Albums Chart. It also peaked at number 4 in the Irish albums chart. NME named Seventeen Going Under the best album of 2021, topping their year-end list, and was named the best indie rock album of 2021 by PopMatters. The album also received a nomination at the 42nd Brit Awards in the British Album of the Year category and won the awards for Best Album by a UK Artist and Best Album in the World at the 2022 NME Awards. The album was nominated for the 2022 Mercury Prize.

== Background ==
On 7 July 2021, Fender announced his second album, Seventeen Going Under and released the title track as the lead single. The single focuses on the time Fender was seventeen and struggling to help his mother financially. Alongside this, Fender announced the tracklist of his then-forthcoming album and described it as "a coming of age story. It's about growing up. It's a celebration of life after hardship, and it's a celebration of surviving".

== Critical reception ==
Professional ratings
Aggregate scores
Source	Rating
Metacritic	83/100
Review scores
Source	Rating
AllMusic	3.5/5 stars
Clash	8/10
The Daily Telegraph	4/5 stars
The Guardian	5/5 stars
The Guitar Magazine	4/5 stars
The Independent	4/5 stars
The Line of Best Fit	8/10
NME	4/5 stars
Pitchfork	6.6/10
PopMatters	9/10

On review aggregator Metacritic, the album has a score of 83 out of 100 based on nine critics' reviews, indicating "universal acclaim". The Guardian writer Alexis Petridis gave the album five out of five stars and named it his album of the week, calling it "urgent, incisive and brave when it would have been easier for Fender to deck out his festival-ready, TikTok-able melodies with something notably blander and less pointed" and "really powerful". Roisin O'Connor of The Independent felt that Fender had refined both "his songwriting and his sound" from his debut, calling the first six songs "far stronger" lyrically than the rest of the album, and summarised Fender as celebrating surviving the "politicised, polarised and [...] permanent state of anxiety" that the world is in.

In Tribune magazine, academic and author Alex Niven wrote, “If there is a better, more painful, more condensed summary of the callousness of British neoliberalism in the times we have all recently lived through, I’m not aware of it."

=== Year-end lists ===
Critics' rankings for Seventeen Going Under
Publication	Accolade	Rank	Ref.
Gaffa	The 10 best albums of the year	4	
The Guardian	The 50 best albums of 2021	11	
The Independent	The 40 best albums of 2021	9	
NME	The 50 best albums of 2021	1	
PopMatters	The 15 Best Indie Rock Albums of 2021	1	
PopMatters	The 75 Best Albums of 2021	3	

== Track listing ==
All tracks are written by Sam Fender.

Standard edition
No.	Title	Length
1.	"Seventeen Going Under"	4:57
2.	"Getting Started"	3:09
3.	"Aye"	3:06
4.	"Get You Down"	4:23
5.	"Long Way Off"	3:49
6.	"Spit of You"	4:33
7.	"Last to Make It Home"	5:21
8.	"The Leveller"	4:01
9.	"Mantra"	4:16
10.	"Paradigms"	3:45
11.	"The Dying Light"	3:57
Total length:		45:17

Deluxe edition
No.	Title	Length
12.	"Better of Me"	3:48
13.	"Pretending That You're Dead"	2:58
14.	"Angel in Lothian"	4:11
15.	"Good Company (Live)"	4:46
16.	"Alright"	4:24
17.	"Poltergeists"	2:31

Live Deluxe edition
No.	Title	Length
16.	"Poltergeists"	2:31
17.	"Howdon Aldi Death Queue"	1:58
18.	"The Kitchen (Live)"	3:40
19.	"Alright"	4:24
20.	"Wild Grey Ocean"	3:54
21.	"Little Bull of Blithe"	2:10
Total length:		79:49

Live Deluxe edition - Live From Finsbury Park (disc 2)
No.	Title	Length
1.	"Will We Talk?"	2:43
2.	"Getting Started"	3:27
3.	"Dead Boys"	4:24
4.	"Mantra"	5:18
5.	"Better of Me"	4:09
6.	"The Borders"	5:37
7.	"Spice"	4:03
8.	"Howdon Aldi Death Queue"	2:53
9.	"Get You Down"	4:36
10.	"Spit of You"	4:43
11.	"Alright"	4:40
12.	"Play God"	4:58
13.	"The Dying Light"	5:26
14.	"Saturday"	6:06
15.	"Seventeen Going Under"	6:15
16.	"Hypersonic Missiles"	6:24
Total length:		75:49

== Charts ==
=== Weekly charts ===
Weekly chart performance for Seventeen Going Under
Chart (2021)	Peak position
Australian Albums (ARIA)	46
Austrian Albums (Ö3 Austria)	56
Belgian Albums (Ultratop Flanders)	16
Belgian Albums (Ultratop Wallonia)	87
Dutch Albums (Album Top 100)	27
German Albums (Offizielle Top 100)	6
Irish Albums (IRMA)	4
Scottish Albums (Official Charts)	1
Swiss Albums (Schweizer Hitparade)	5
UK Albums (Official Charts)	1
US Top Current Album Sales (Billboard)	81

=== Year-end charts ===
2021 year-end chart performance for Seventeen Going Under
Chart (2021)	Position
UK Albums (OCC)	45

2022 year-end chart performance for Seventeen Going Under
Chart (2022)	Position
UK Albums (OCC)	21

2023 year-end chart performance for Seventeen Going Under
Chart (2023)	Position
UK Albums (OCC)	88

== Certifications ==
Region	Certification	Certified units/sales
New Zealand (RMNZ)	Gold	7,500^{‡}
United Kingdom (BPI)	Platinum	300,000^{‡}
^{‡} Sales+streaming figures based on certification alone.

== See also ==
- List of UK Albums Chart number ones of the 2020s
