= Chaneil Kular =

English actor

- Born: 20 August 1999 (age 27)
- Occupation: Actor
- Years active: 2018–present
- Known for: Accused; Sex Education; The Revenge Club

Chaneil Kular (born 20 August 1999) is an English actor. After making his debut as Tariq Amiri on the BBC soap opera Doctors (2018), he began portraying the role of Anwar Bakshi in the Netflix comedy-drama series Sex Education (2019–2021). He has also appeared in Black Narcissus (2020), Bodies (2023) and Protection (2024) and played the lead role in Accused (2023).

== Life and career ==
Kular studied theatre and film at Bristol University.

Kular made his acting debut in 2018 when he joined the cast of the BBC soap opera Doctors as Tariq Amiri, who was introduced as a love interest for established character Alia Hanif (Lisa Ambalavanar). The character appeared in the soap on a recurring basis between June and September 2018, before leaving following the end of his relationship with Alia. Kular then went on to appear in an episode of the BBC One drama series Informer as a pizza delivery boy.

Kular starred in the Netflix comedy-drama Sex Education as Anwar Bakshi, a gay student of Indian heritage who is a member of "the Untouchables" clique. In 2020 he appeared in the BBC One drama series Black Narcissus as Dilip Rai. In 2022, Kular portrayed Cammy in an episode of the American FX comedy-drama series Atlanta.

In September 2023 Kular made his feature film debut playing the leading role of Harri Bhavsar in thriller film Accused, directed by filmmaker Philip Barantini. His performance and the film both received critical acclaim.

Kular then portrayed Arthur Hamilton in the German Amazon Prime feature film Silver and the Book of Dreams and Syed Tahir in Netflix Original series Bodies. DS Raj Kholi in the 2024 ITV crime drama series Protection and Manish in BBC One comedy series The Cleaner.

In 2025, Kular portrayed Tej in Paramount+ series The Revenge Club. In 2026, Kular played Kameron Campallo in Mutiny and Arjun in the Netflix Original movie Best of The Best.

Year	Title	Role	Notes	Ref.
2018	Doctors	Tariq Amiri	Recurring role	
2018	Informer	Pizza delivery boy	1 episode	
2019–2021	Sex Education	Anwar Bakshi	Main role	
2020	Black Narcissus	Dilip Rai	Main role	
2022	Atlanta	Cammy	1 episode	
2023	Accused	Harri Bhavsar	Film	
2023	Silver and the Book of Dreams	Arthur Hamilton	Film	
2023	Bodies	Syed Tahir	Guest role	
2024	Protection	DS Raj Kholi	Recurring role	
2024	The Cleaner	Manish	Guest role	
2025	False 9	Tres	Short Film	
2025	Rider	Indra	Short Film	
2025	Skylight	Sam	Short Film	
2025	The Revenge Club	Tej	6 episodes	
2026	Mutiny	Kameron Campallo	Film	
2026	Best of the Best	Arjun	Netflix Film	
