= Philip Barantini =

British actor and filmmaker (born 1980)

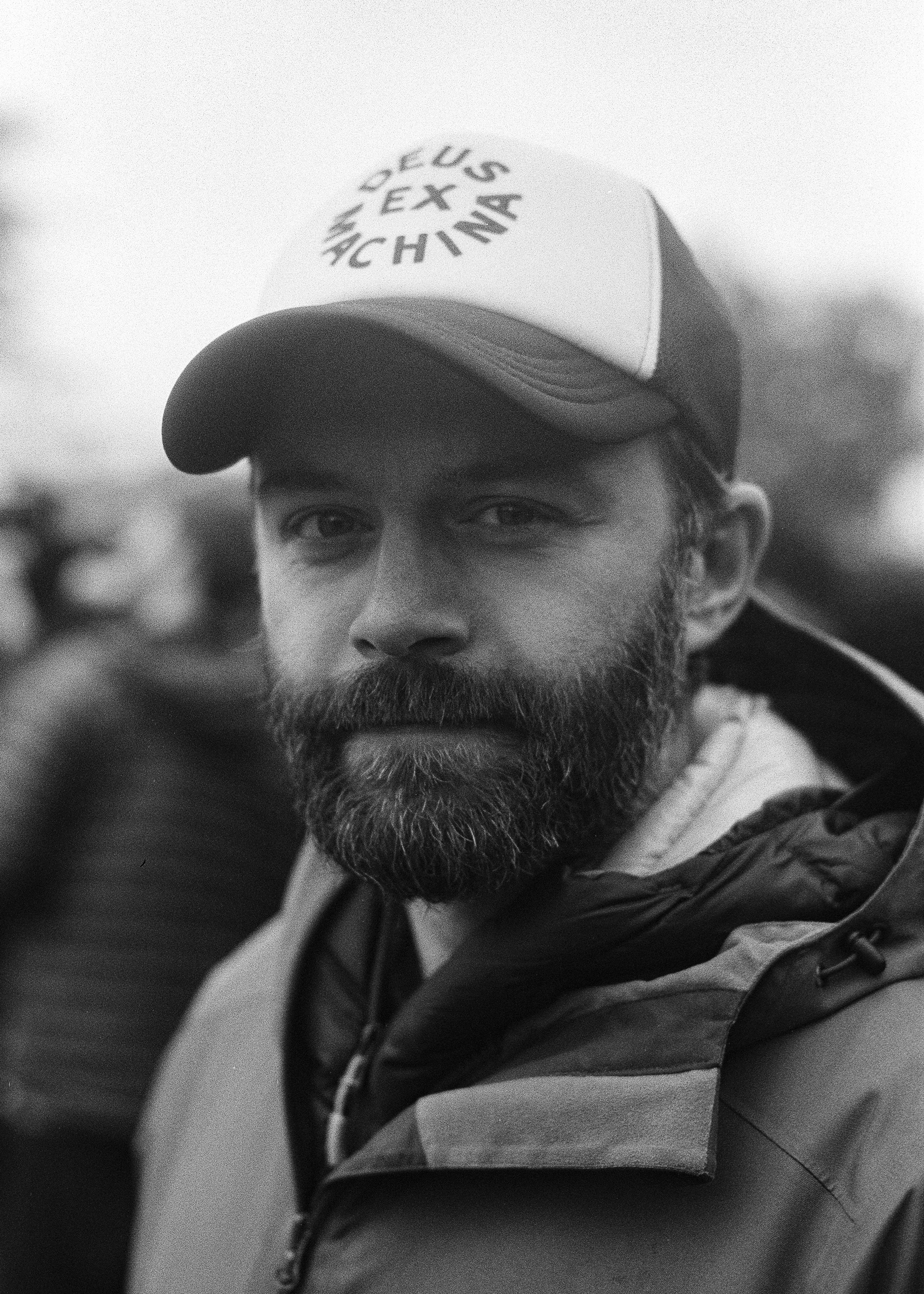
- Barantini in 2022
- Born: 13 July 1980 (age 46); Liverpool, Merseyside, England
- Occupations: Actor; director; producer; screenwriter
- Years active: 1998–present

Philip Barantini (born 13 July 1980) is a British filmmaker and actor. Known for his intense one-shot works, he directed the film Boiling Point (2021), its follow-up series (2023) and the miniseries Adolescence (2025), all starring Stephen Graham. He has received two Primetime Emmy Awards and BAFTA Award nomination.

As an actor, his notable roles include appearances in Dream Team, Band of Brothers, and The Responder.

== Early life ==
Philip Barantini was born in Liverpool and grew up in Huyton, Merseyside.

== Career ==
=== Early career ===
Barantini was at first an actor, notably starring as Sergeant Wayne A. "Skinny" Sisk in HBO's Band of Brothers (2001). His other television roles include Billy O'Neill in Dream Team (1998–2000), Bezpalov in Chernobyl (2019), and Steve in The Responder (2022).

Barantini starred as Steve Hart in the film Ned Kelly (2003) alongside Heath Ledger and Orlando Bloom. His other film roles included Joey in The Escapist (2002), David in Hard Boiled Sweets (2012), and John Morgan in A Violent Man (2022).

Whilst acting, Barantini expressed an interest in directing, taking opportunities to shadow other directors. He made his directorial debut with the short film Seconds Out (2019), shortly before filming and releasing his second short Boiling Point (2019), which reunited him with his friend and Band of Brothers co-star Stephen Graham. The short earned him the Lift-Off Season Award for Best Short at the Manchester awards.

Barantini's first feature film was the gritty crime thriller Villain, starring Craig Fairbrass.

=== 2020–present: Boiling Point and other activities ===
Following the success of the 2019 kitchen drama, Barantini co-wrote a feature film, also titled Boiling Point (2021), with his one-time writing partner James Cummings. Barantini drew inspiration for many of the story arcs from his own experiences as a head chef as well as experiences of those who he knew who worked in the industry. The feature saw Stephen Graham reprise the lead role of chef Andy Jones and was filmed in one true take.

Graham described working on the single-shot feature as "the most exhilarating array of emotions I've ever felt on a film set in my life". The film was nominated for 11 BIFA awards in 2021, including Best Director and Best British Independent Film and won Best Cinematography for Director of Photography Matt Lewis and Best Casting for Carolyn McLeod. The film went on to be nominated for four BAFTAs at the 2022 ceremony, including a nomination for Outstanding British Film of the Year and Best Leading Actor for Stephen Graham.

In September 2021, Barantini directed the music video for Sam Fender's "Spit of You", which chronicled Fender's relationship with his father, portrayed in the video by Stephen Graham. The video won the UKMVA award for Best Rock Video in 2022, beating the likes of Muse and Florence + The Machine.

In February 2022, Barantini directed British thriller Accused written by James Cummings and Barnaby Boulton. The film starred Chaneil Kular and was released on 22 September 2023 in select territories on Netflix and on Tubi in the United States.

Barantini will direct the third film in Netflix's Enola Holmes film series. He will succeed Harry Bradbeer, who directed the first two films.

=== Television series ===
Barantini was given a role in the Liverpool-based TV drama The Responder, with Martin Freeman and was subsequently asked to direct the final episode. He directed the finale.

In 2022, Barantini directed the five-part ITV drama series Malpractice (2022) starring Niamh Algar.

A series sequel of Boiling Point was announced in 2022, and began filming in early 2023. The four-part series was released on BBC One in December 2023 and was co-produced by Matriarch Productions (headed by Stephen Graham and Hannah Walters) and Ascendant Fox, along with Barantini's own production company It's All Made Up Productions. Barantini was a producer, co-creator and director on the series, directing the first two episodes of the series with the final two directed by Mounia Akl. The series saw the return of many of the familiar characters from the feature and picked up a few months on from where the film ended.

Barantini commenced filming the four-part series Adolescence in summer 2024, directing all four episodes, which saw him reunite with long-term collaborator Stephen Graham. The series saw each episode filmed in one continuous shot and was produced by Warp Films, Plan B Entertainment, and Matriarch Productions for Netflix. The series was released on 13 March 2025.

== Awards and nominations ==
| Award | Year | Category | Work | Result | Ref. |
|---|---|---|---|---|---|
| British Academy Film Awards | 2022 | Outstanding British Film of the Year | Boiling Point | Nominated | |
| British Academy Television Awards | 2026 | Best Limited Drama | Adolescence | Won | |
| British Academy Television Craft Awards | 2026 | Best Director: Fiction | Adolescence | Won | |
| British Independent Film Awards | 2019 | Best British Short Film | Boiling Point (Short 2019) | Nominated | |
| British Independent Film Awards | 2021 | Best Director | Boiling Point | Nominated | |
| British Independent Film Awards | 2021 | Best British Independent Film | Boiling Point | Nominated | |
| Broadcasting Press Guild Awards | 2024 | Best Drama Series | Boiling Point | Nominated | |
| Encounters Short Film and Animation Festival | 2019 | Brief Encounters Best of British – Special Mention | Boiling Point (Short 2019) | Won | |
| Gotham TV Awards | 2025 | Breakthrough Limited Series | Adolescence | Won | |
| Primetime Emmy Awards | 2025 | Outstanding Directing for a Limited or Anthology Series or Movie | Adolescence | Won | |
| Primetime Emmy Awards | 2025 | Outstanding Limited or Anthology Series | Adolescence | Won | |
| Romford Film Festival | 2020 | Jury Prize | Seconds Out | Won | |
| Seoul International Drama Awards | 2025 | Best Director | Adolescence | Won | |
| Taormina Film Fest | 2022 | Cariddi d'Oro | Boiling Point | Won | |
| Taormina Film Fest | 2022 | Best Director | Boiling Point | Won | |
| UK Music Video Awards | 2022 | Best Rock Video | Sam Fender's Spit of You | Won | |

== Filmography ==
=== Short film ===
| Year | Title | Director | Writer | Producer |
|---|---|---|---|---|
| 2019 | Seconds Out | Yes | No | Yes |
| 2019 | Boiling Point | Yes | Yes | No |
| 2020 | Spanish Pigeon | Yes | No | No |

Executive Producer

- Wanderlust (2016)
- A Place for Everything (2017)

Acting roles

| Year | Title | Role |
|---|---|---|
| 2011 | Wake Up England! The Day that Morning was Broken | Jonny Redeyes |
| 2012 | Sh-Boom! | Danny |
| 2013 | Camelot | Henry |
| 2014 | Little | Karl |
| 2016 | Set Adrift | John |
| 2016 | Wanderlust | Tim |
| 2017 | A Place for Everything | Daniel Morsley |
| 2019 | Hatima | Steve |
| 2019 | Stop and Search | Terry (Policeman) |

=== Feature film ===
| Year | Title | Director | Writer | Executive Producer | Notes |
|---|---|---|---|---|---|
| 2017 | An Actor's Life (Less Ordinary) | No | No | Yes | |
| 2020 | Villain | Yes | No | Yes | |
| 2021 | Boiling Point | Yes | Yes | Yes | |
| 2023 | Accused | Yes | No | Yes | |
| 2026 | Enola Holmes 3 | Yes | No | No | |

Supervising producer

- Nightshooters (2018)

Producer

- Levelling the Score (2019)
- Wasteman (2025)

Acting roles

| Year | Title | Role |
|---|---|---|
| 2002 | The Escapist | Joey |
| 2003 | Ned Kelly | Steve Hart |
| 2003 | The Boys from County Clare | Alex |
| 2012 | Hard Boiled Sweets | Dean |
| 2013 | Young, High and Dead | John |
| 2014 | The Spoiler | Sunderland |
| 2014 | Cryptic | John Jonas |
| 2015 | World War Dead: Rise of the Fallen | Liam |
| 2017 | An Actor's Life (Less Ordinary) | Philip |
| 2018 | Nightshooters | Chad |
| 2021 | A Violent Man | John Morgan |

=== Television ===
| Year | Title | Director | Executive Producer | Notes |
|---|---|---|---|---|
| 2022 | The Responder | Yes | No | Directed series 1, episode 5 |
| 2023 | Malpractice | Yes | Yes | Directed series 1 |
| 2023 | Boiling Point | Yes | Yes | Directed 2 episodes; also creator |
| 2025 | Adolescence | Yes | Yes | Miniseries |
| TBA | Rabbit, Rabbit | Yes | Yes | |

Associate producer

- This City is Ours (2025)

Acting roles

| Year | Title | Role | Notes |
|---|---|---|---|
| 1998 | Big Cat | Jason Woodman | Episode: "A Family Affair" |
| 1998–2000 | Dream Team | Billy O'Neil | 139 episodes |
| 2001 | Band of Brothers | Private Wayne A. "Skinny" Sisk | 9 episodes |
| 2002 | The American Embassy | Jason | Episode: "China Cup" |
| 2007 | Doctors | Danny Leighton | Episode: "Playing Dad" |
| 2008 | 10 Days to War | Ranger Giddins | Episode: "Our Business Is North" |
| 2008 | The Bill | Dave Patterson | Episode: "Loved and Lost" |
| 2009 | Minder | Wes Gray | Episode: "Thank Your Lucky Stars" |
| 2012 | Mrs. Brown's Boys | IT Man | Episode: "iMammy (Batteries Not Included)" |
| 2016 | The Musketeers | Robert | Episode: "Fool's Gold" |
| 2016 | Casualty | Paul Prentice | Episode: "This Life" |
| 2018 | Genesis | Richard Broadman | Episode: "iMammy (Batteries Not Included)" |
| 2018 | Humans | Paul | 2 episodes |
| 2019 | Chernobyl | Valery Bespalov | 2 episodes |
| 2021 | Time | Floyd Walker | 2 episodes |
| 2022–2024 | The Responder | Steve | Recurring |
