= Vinette Robinson =

British actress (born 1981)

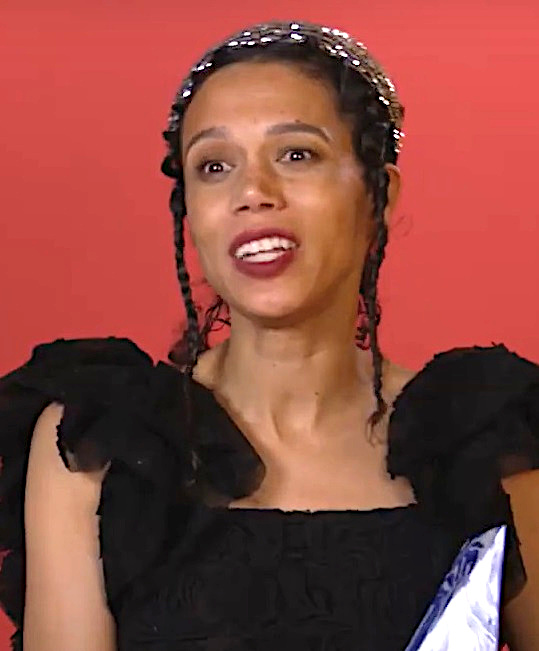
- Robinson in 2021
- Born: 1981 (age 44–45); Bradford, West Yorkshire, England
- Education: Webber Douglas Academy of Dramatic Art
- Occupation: Actress
- Years active: 1998–present

Vinette Robinson (born 1981) is an English actress. She won a British Independent Film Award for her performance in the film Boiling Point (2021), a role she reprised in its spinoff series. On television, she is known for her roles in the BBC One series Waterloo Road (2009), Sherlock (2010–2014) and The A Word (2016–2017). She also guest starred in Black Mirror (2015) and as civil rights campaigner Rosa Parks in the Doctor Who episode "Rosa" (2018).

== Early life and education ==
Vinette Robinson was born in 1981 in Bradford, West Yorkshire, to a Jamaican father and a British mother.

Robinson went to primary and secondary school in Bradford, then did drama in sixth form at Intake High School in Leeds. She also took weekly courses at the Scala School of Performing Arts theatre school in Leeds. She went on to train at the Webber Douglas Academy of Dramatic Art, where she was awarded a Laurence Olivier Bursary from the Society of London Theatre.

== Career ==
Robinson began auditioning when she was thirteen years old; her first audition was for the role of Queen Amidala in the 1999 film Star Wars: Episode I – The Phantom Menace, a part that ultimately went to Natalie Portman. She made her television debut in an episode of the BBC Two police procedural The Cops at the age of 17. After graduating from drama school, she had a small role as the Jamaican girl in the 2004 film Vera Drake but was given an entire character backstory by the director Mike Leigh.

Her first stage role was in the National Theatre / Complicité production of Measure for Measure. Following this she was part of the Gunpowder season at the Royal Shakespeare Company, where she played the tortured servant May in Rupert Goold's production of Speaking Like Magpies by Frank McGuinness. In 2006 she played Eve in a production of Paradise Lost. Commenting on her nude scene, Sheila Tracy of The Stage wrote "one can not imagine the action working in any other way". Her performance in Sugar Mummies that same year led New York magazine to list her as one of "London's hottest young stage actors" in 2007. Following the conclusion of Sugar Mummies, she appeared in a short feature for Time Out, in which she and five other actors were described as "innovative young theatrical talent".

In 2009 she played Josie Porritt in the BBC series Hope Springs and appeared as newly qualified English teacher Helen Hopewell in eight episodes of the BBC school drama Waterloo Road's fifth series. From December 2009 to January 2010, she starred as the maid Florence in Hampstead Theatre's Darker Shores. In a Daily Telegraph review that rated the play only two stars, Charles Spencer commended Robinson's performance as having "a warmth and emotional openness". Kate Bassett for The Independent on Sunday also praised her, writing that she "copes admirably". In 2010 she starred as police sergeant Sally Donovan in the BBC series Sherlock, continuing her role in the second and third series that aired in January 2012 and December 2013/January 2014.

In 2011 Robinson appeared in Philip Ridley's Tender Napalm, receiving The Offie for Best Female. She then went on to play Ophelia in The Young Vic's production of Hamlet, for which she received the Clarence Derwent Award. Her role as Ophelia led to her inclusion in the New York Times Magazine article "Titans of the Stage". In 2016 she appeared in Hated in the Nation, an episode of the anthology series Black Mirror.

In October 2018, Robinson appeared in the Doctor Who episode "Rosa", portraying civil rights campaigner Rosa Parks. It was her second appearance in Doctor Who, following her portrayal of the character Abi Lerner in the 2007 episode "42". In 2019 Robinson appeared briefly in Star Wars: The Rise of Skywalker as a pilot who receives a same-sex kiss, a first for the film franchise.

She appeared in the 2021 one-take film Boiling Point for which she received critical acclaim, as well as the BIFA for Best Supporting Actress. She portrays a sous chef to an insolent, alcoholic head chef over the course of one hectic night at a busy restaurant.

== Acting credits ==
=== Film ===
Year	Film	Role	Notes	Ref.
2004	Vera Drake	Jamaican Girl		
2005	Imagine Me & You	Zina		
2011	Powder	Hannah		
2016	Morgan	Dr. Brenda Finch		
2019	Frankie	Sylvia		
2019	Star Wars: The Rise of Skywalker	Pilot Tyce		
2020	Say Your Prayers	Imelda		
2021	Boiling Point	Carly		
2023	The Pod Generation	Alice		
2025	The Thing with Feathers	Amanda		

=== Television ===
Year	Title	Role	Notes	Ref.
1998	City Central	Girl	Episode: "Justice to Be Done"	
1998	The Cops	Sarah Midgely	Episode: "Top of the Game"	
1999	Children's Ward	Joy	Guest role; 2 episodes	
1999	Cold Feet	Female Shop Assistant	Episode #2.2	
2000	Doctors	Cath Bickerstaff	Guest role; 2 episodes	
2000	This Is Personal: The Hunt for the Yorkshire Ripper	Rita Rytka	Episode: "Episode 1"	
2000	Fat Friends	Young Shop Assistant	Episode: "Face the Fat"	
2001	Always and Everyone	Teresa	Episode: "Safe from Harm"	
2003	Between the Sheets	Tracy Ellis	Miniseries; 6 episodes	
2004	Murphy's Law	Aimie	Episode: "Jack's Back"	
2004	Blue Murder	Andrea	Episode: "Hit and Run"	
2004	Doctors	Melanie	Episode: "Daddy's Girl"	
2005	Casualty	Kirsty Evans	Episode: "Truth Will Out"	
2007-2018	Doctor Who	Abi Lerner/Rosa Parks	Episodes: "42" and "Rosa"	
2007	Party Animals	Kerry	Recurring role; 2 episodes	
2007	Hustle	Tina	Episode: "A Designer's Paradise"	
2007	Doctors	Katie Waters	Episode: "Hero"	
2008	The Passion	Mina	Episode: "Episode 2"	
2009	Hope Springs	Josie Porritt	Series regular; 8 episodes	
2009	Waterloo Road	Helen Hopewell	Series regular; 8 episodes	
2010–2014	Sherlock	Sally Donovan	Recurring role; 4 episodes	
2014	Vera	Corinne Franks	Episode: "Castles in the Air"	
2014	Assistance	Jenny	Television film	
2014	Death in Paradise	Lauren Campese	Episode: "An Artistic Murder"	
2014	The Red Tent	Bilhah	Miniseries; 2 episodes	
2015	Black Work	Zoe Nash	Miniseries; 2 episodes	
2016	Black Mirror	Liza Bahar	Episode: "Hated in the Nation"	
2016	Close to the Enemy	Rita	Miniseries; 5 episodes	
2016–2017	Delicious	Rosa	Recurring role; 3 episodes	
2016–2017	The A Word	Nicola Daniels	Series regular; 12 episodes	
2017	Year Million	Eva	Miniseries; 5 episodes	
2019	I Am...	Toni	Episode: "I Am Kirsty"	
2019	A Christmas Carol	Mary Cratchit	Miniseries; 3 episodes	
2019	Soon Gone: A Windrush Chronicle	Yvonne	Episode: "Yvonne 1981"	
2021	The Amazing Mr. Blunden	Mrs. Allen	Television film	
2022	Code 404	Professor Sarah McAllister	Recurring role; 5 episodes	
2022–2023	The Lazarus Project	Janet	Series regular; 10 episodes	
2023	Six Four	Michelle O'Neill	Miniseries; 4 episodes	
2023	Boiling Point	Carly	Miniseries; 4 episodes	
2024	The Gathering	Natalie	Recurring role; 2 episodes	
2024	Inside No. 9	Val	Episode: "Mulberry Close"	
2024	Suspect	Louisa	Episode: "Louisa"	
2026	Silent Witness	DI Fiona Mahler	Episode: "Grace of God"	

=== Theatre ===
Year	Title	Role	Director	Performance history	Ref.
2004	Measure for Measure	Juliet		National Theatre	
2005	A New Way to Please You	Footman		Royal Shakespeare Company	
2005	Sejanus: His Fall	High Priestess		Royal Shakespeare Company	
2005	Thomas More	Lady Roper		Royal Shakespeare Company	
2005	Speaking Like Magpies	May		Royal Shakespeare Company	
2006	Paradise Lost	Eve		Headlong	
2006	Sugar Mummies	Naomi		Royal Court Theatre	
2008	War & Peace	Hélène/Mlle Bourienne	Nancy Meckler and Polly Teale	National tour, 7 February–11 May 2008	
2009	Darker Shores	Florence Kennedy	Anthony Clarke	Hampstead Theatre, 7 December 2009–16 January 2010	
2011	Tender Napalm	Unnamed female lead	David Mercatali	Southwark Playhouse	
2011	Hamlet	Ophelia	Ian Rickson	Young Vic, 28 October 2011–21 January 2012	
2018	Emilia	Emilia 2	Nicole Charles	Shakespeare's Globe	

=== Video games ===
Year	Title	Role	Ref.
2014	Dragon Age: Inquisition	Sister Tanner (voice)	

== Awards and nominations ==
Year	Association	Category	Role	Work	Result	Ref.
2012	Clarence Derwent Awards	Best Female in a Supporting Role	Ophelia	Hamlet	Won	
2021	BIFA	Best Supporting Actress	Carly	Boiling Point	Won	
2023	BAFTA Scotland	Best Actress - Television	Michelle O'Neill	Six Four	Nominated	
