= Bart Ruspoli =

English actor

Bartolomeo Sebastian Ruspoli (born 8 November 1976 in London) is an English actor.

== Career ==
Bart Ruspoli trained at the Webber Douglas Academy of Dramatic Art, where he graduated in 1998. He is also the writer and Producer of two of the films he was in.

In 2022, he was nominated for a BAFTA for Outstanding British Film for “Boiling Point” which he produced.

== Filmography ==
- 2point4 Children (1 episode, "The Italian Job", 1998) .... Fabrizio
- Heartbeat (1 episode, "Wise Guys", 2000) .... Marco Mazzetti
- Fish (1 episode, "Another Shade of White", 2000) .... Antonio - pizza delivery boy
- Jack Brown and the Curse of the Crown (2001) .... Malook
- Dead Creatures (2001) (V) .... Christian
- Band of Brothers (3 episodes, "Carentan", "Currahee" and "Day of Days", 2001) TV mini-series .... Pvt. Edward Tipper
- The Long Night (2002) (V) .... Joe (also Writer and Producer)
- Four (2002) (TV) .... Nick (also Writer and Producer)
- Ghost Master (2003) (VG) .... Ghostmaster (Italian version)
- Venus Drowning (2005) .... John
- Empire (2005) TV mini-series .... Principe
- Rome (2 episodes, "The Stolen Eagle" and "How Titus Pullo Brought Down the Republic", 2005) .... Antony's Tribune
- Elizabeth David: A Life in Recipes (2006) (TV) .... Doctor
- I Said So Little (2006) (V) .... Postman
- EastEnders (5 episodes, 2007) .... Marco
- Mixed Up (2009) .... Mike
- The Devil's Playground (2010) .... Matt
- Genesis (2018) .... producer

== See also ==
- Ruspoli
