= Isobel Jesper Jones =

English actress

- Education: Royal Academy of Dramatic Art (BA)
- Occupation: Actress
- Years active: 2022-present
- Television: The Bastard Son & The Devil Himself

Isobel Jesper Jones is an English television and film actress. Her television roles include The Bastard Son & The Devil Himself (2022), The Serpent Queen (2024), and Outrageous (2025).

== Early life ==
From Birmingham, she became drawn to acting from a younger age while watching local theatre with her mother. She later trained at the Royal Academy of Dramatic Art in London, graduating in 2020.

== Career ==
She appeared in Joe Barton Netflix young adult dark comedy series The Bastard Son & The Devil Himself alongside Nadia Parkes and Jay Lycurgo in 2022, adapted from the Half Bad book series by Sally Green. She portrayed shapeshifting bully Jessica, listed by the NME as one of the “20 best worst characters” in television history in 2022.

She appeared in the 2023 prequel film The Hunger Games: The Ballad of Songbirds & Snakes, adapted from the 2020 novel The Ballad of Songbirds and Snakes by Suzanne Collins, playing Mayfair Lipp, daughter of the mayor of District 12.

She appeared in 2024 in the second series of television historical drama The Serpent Queen as Edith, a Protestant preacher.

She can be seen as Pamela Mitford in 2025 British historical drama series Outrageous on UKTV.

== Filmography ==
| Year | Title | Role | Notes |
|---|---|---|---|
| 2022 | The Bastard Son & The Devil Himself | Jessica | Main cast; 8 episodes |
| 2023 | The Hunger Games: The Ballad of Songbirds & Snakes | Mayfair Lipp | Feature film |
| 2024 | The Serpent Queen | Edith | 8 episodes |
| 2025 | Outrageous | Pamela Mitford | Main cast: 6 episodes |
