= Emilien Vekemans =

Belgian actor

- Born: 1992 (age 33–34)
- Education: Institut des Arts de Diffusion
- Years active: 2013–present

Emilien Vekemans (born 1992) is a Belgian actor. He is best known to international audiences for his role in the Netflix series The Bastard Son & The Devil Himself (2022).

== Early life ==
Vekemans is from Brussels. He studied Drama at the Institut des Arts de Diffusion (IAD) in Ottignies-Louvain-la-Neuve, graduating in 2013 and then completing a Master's in 2014. In 2016, he took a drama course at the Stella Adler Studio of Acting and a workshop with James Temp in Berlin.

== Career ==
From 2013 to 2015, Vekemans starred as Max in the YouTube and La Deux comedy web series Typique. He made his feature film debut in the 2014 children's fantasy film The Secret of Arkandias (French: Le Grimoire d'Arkandias). In 2017, he appeared in the RTBF series La Théorie du Y as well as the Netflix series Transferts.

Vekemans had recurring roles as Tom Rivière in the first two seasons of ASKIP, le collège se la raconte on France 4 and Roger Lagarrigue in the 1960s high school-set Amazon Prime series Voltaire High (French: Mixte). He also appeared in the France 2 miniseries Voltaire in Love. He made his English-language debut starring as Gabriel in the 2022 British Netflix series The Bastard Son & The Devil Himself, an adaptation of Sally Green's young adult fantasy novel Half Bad.

== Filmography ==
=== Film ===
Year	Title	Role	Notes
2014	The Secret of Arkandias (French: Le Grimoire d'Arkandias)	Fabrice	
2015	We Will All Be Famous	Jake	Short film
2016	Fighting Story	Lionel	Short film
2017	Blue Boy	Emile	Short film
2018	Lendemain de mariage	Thibaud	Short film
2018	Horizontale	Gabriel	Short film
2019	Saudade	Arnaud	Short film
2019	Panda	Leo	Short film

=== Television ===
Year	Title	Role	Notes
2013–2015	Typique	Max	Web; main role
2017	La Théorie du Y	Sam	3 episodes
2017	Promo 2017	Victor	
2017	Lucas etc.	Kevin	2 episodes
2017	Transferts	Fabrice	3 episodes
2017	Unit 42	Benjamin Corti	Episode: "Standby Mode"
2020	Candice Renoir	Ludovic Desanti	Episode: "Souvent le Feu Éteint Dort Sous la Cendre"
2020	Spiral	Young OPJ	1 episode
2020–2021	Askip	Tom Rivière	recurring role (seasons 1–2 - 28 episodes)
2021	Voltaire in Love (French: Les Aventures du jeune Voltaire)	Comédien Oedipe	Miniseries
2021	Mixte	Roger Lagarrigue	5 episodes
2022	The Bastard Son & The Devil Himself	Gabriel Boutin	Main role
2024	La Maison	Minister's Assistant	Episode: "17 Seconds"
2025	Hotel Costiera	Bastien	2 episodes
