= Half Lost =

Fantasy novel

- Front cover of the hardcover edition
- Author: Sally Green
- Cover artist: Justin Metz; Tim Green*
- Language: English
- Series: The Half Bad Trilogy
- Subjects: Fantasy & magic; Paranormal/occult & supernatural; Social themes/violence
- Genres: Young adult; Fantasy; LGBT
- Published: March 29, 2016
- Publisher: Penguin Random House (UK); Viking Press (US)
- Publication place: United Kingdom
- Media type: Print (hardback & paperback)
- Pages: 340 (hardcover)
- ISBN: 9780670017140
- Preceded by: Half Wild
- * Dustjacket art is credited to Justin Metz, "based on original design by Tim Green" (who illustrated Volumes 1 and 2 of the UK editions of the series)

Half Lost is a 2016 young adult fantasy novel written by English author Sally Green. It is the third and final installment in the Half Bad Trilogy and the sequel to the previous book in the trilogy Half Wild. The novel was published on March 29, 2016 by Penguin Random House.

== Plot ==
Marcus, The Alliance's greatest weapon, is dead. Nathan is once again on the run. And he is out for revenge.

Forced to consume his father's heart, he must now learn to master his many new gifts that might be the now-decimated Alliance's only hope for survival. Nathan's last chance to defeat Wallend, Soul and their army of Hunters is to find the reclusive black witch Ledger and convince them to give him the second half of Gabriel's amulet so that he might become invincible.

== Characters ==
Nathan Byrn: The seventeen year old protagonist. He has straight black hair, olive skin and black eyes. It is commonly remarked that he possesses a strong resemblance to his father Marcus. He was raised in a family of White Witches. He was adored by his older brother and sister, however he was hated by his eldest sister who blamed him for the death of her father and their mother's suicide. His father being a black witch and his mother being a white witch, the Council of White Witches referred to him as a "Half-Code". His body is cicatriced by scars from long healed wounds, including severe burns on one of his wrists and a "BW" carved into his back by Kieran O'Brien. He also has six tattoos that were magically branded onto him by Mr. Wallend in order to make a witch's bottle.

Jessica Byrn: Nathan's oldest half-sister who hates him. As a child she constantly harasses and is cruel towards Nathan. After gaining her Gift (Shape-Shifting), she joins the Hunters and ascends their ranks, eventually becoming their leader.

Arran Byrn: Nathan's half-brother, with whom Nathan has a loving relationship. He joins the Alliance as a healer.

Deborah Byrn: Nathan's half-sister. She, like Arran, loves Nathan.

Marcus Edge: Nathan's father, the most feared Black Witch of all time. He killed Nathan's siblings' father, among many others. His Gift is transforming into animals but he has also stolen Gifts from many other witches by killing them and eating their hearts. Once, he had a vision of Nathan killing him with the Fairborn, and consequently he had avoided him for most of his life. However, he eventually meets Nathan on his 17th birthday and performs his Giving Ceremony.

Gabriel Boutin: A Black Witch stuck in the body of a fain. In the second book, he is returned to his original Witch body. Gabriel is tall and slim, has brown eyes and long, brown hair that falls to his shoulders. He falls in love with Nathan and believes him to be the perfect witch—a blend of both Black and White. Gabriel's feelings towards Nathan were initially not reciprocated because of his affection for Annalise; however these feelings disappear once she shoots Marcus and Nathan and Gabriel's romantic relationship begins to grow.

Victoria Van Dal: A powerful Black Witch who is gifted in potion making. In the second book she helped Gabriel to regain his original Witch body. She becomes one of Nathan's most important allies in the rebellion against the Council of White Witches.

Annalise O'Brien: A White Witch, some months older than Nathan. She is Nathan's initial primary love interest, however they begin to grow apart when Annalise begins to see some of the violence that Nathan is capable of in battle, and Nathan eventually grows to hate her after she shoots Marcus, thus forcing Nathan to consume his heart. She faces some time in prison for her killing of Marcus, where she gives birth to Nathan's son, Edge.

Celia: A White Witch, Nathan's mentor who he was sent to live with as a child. She abused and locked him in a cage. Nathan hates her and is initially hesitant to be a part of any Alliance with her; however their relationship eventually grows closer and less strained.

Edge: Edge is the son of Annalise O'Brien and Nathan Byrn. Nathan never meets him and not much is known about him. He is named after Nathan's family name in honor of him.

== Reception ==
Half Lost has received predominantly positive reviews—though the audience has been strongly divided over the ending to the series.

A review in The Guardian read: "And the ending. Ah, the ending. This one is definitely going to divide people... I don’t even exactly know how I feel about it myself; I’m still reeling and bewildered, to be honest...Overall, I did think this was a strong finish to the series. I think it will please fans of the grittiness of the earlier books in the series, like me. I did say some negative things here, but it was an excellent and gripping read."

A Publishers Weekly starred review read: "Green’s portrait of Nathan as a damaged mixture of good and evil, a sort of well-meaning monster, is masterly, and the series’ intensity and the author’s willingness to put her characters through enormous pain and transformative loss haven’t changed a bit. Powerful scenes of suffering, defeat, and—occasionally—triumph can be found throughout. Readers will finish this grueling, cathartic tale both relieved and satisfied."

Kirkus Reviews also gave the book a starred review, calling it "an immensely satisfying finale."

== Adaptations ==
In 2020, it was announced that Netflix was producing a TV adaptation of the Half Bad trilogy, helmed by Joe Barton. It will be executive produced by Andy Serkis and Jonathan Cavendish for The Imaginarium. The Bastard Son & The Devil Himself was released on 28 October 2022.
