= Fehinti Balogun =

British Nigerian actor

- Education: Royal Academy of Dramatic Art
- Occupation: Actor
- Years active: 2016-present
- Television: Down Cemetery Road

Fehinti Balogun is a British Nigerian stage, television and film actor, and climate activist.

== Career ==
Balogun is British Nigerian. He graduated from The Royal Academy of Dramatic Art (RADA) in 2016. In 2017, his first theatre role was in a Royal Shakespeare Company production. After graduating he appeared in an Old Vic production of King Lear.

Balogun's stage roles also included playing Bryan alongside Gemma Arterton in the play Walden at the Harold Pinter Theatre in 2021. Later that year, he performed a climate change themed show Can I Live? of which he was the writer and central performer, produced by Complicité in association with the Barbican and supported by Oxford Playhouse, and which combined a mix of hip-hop and spoken word as well as dance and was directed by Daniel Bailey and co-directed by Simon McBurney with musical director Khalil Madovi.

Balogun portrayed the character Damon in Michaela Coel television drama series I May Destroy You. He also had roles in ITVX series Viewpoint and Denis Villeneuve film Dune (2021). He portrayed Bjorn in Joe Barton series The Bastard Son & The Devil Himself on Netflix.

In 2024, he could be seen in Paramount+ adaptation of A Gentleman in Moscow as Mishka, alongside Ewan McGregor. In 2025, Balogun could be seen portraying Amos in Apple TV+ adaptation of the Mick Herron novel Down Cemetery Road alongside Emma Thompson and Ruth Wilson. He received critical praise for his role, with Morgan Cormack in the Radio Times asking could "Amos be the perfect TV villain? He's unintentionally very funny, no-nonsense, slick and just damn good at being a bad guy. Sure, he kills people with absolutely no remorse and fits all the markers of a psychopath, but he's the kind of antagonist that you can't help but enjoy watching". For the role he was nominated in the supporting actor category at the British Academy Television Awards.

He has an upcoming role in Raine Allen-Miller London-set film The Roots Manoeuvre.

== Personal life ==
A climate activist, Balogun has presented at the United Nations COP26 climate summit, the Scottish Parliament, Cambridge University, and the YouTube Creator Summit.

== Partial filmography ==
=== Film and television ===
Key
†	Denotes works that have not yet been released

Year	Title	Role	Notes
2018	Informer	Officer Cooper	
2020	I May Destroy You	Damon	
2021	The Electrical Life of Louis Wain		
2021	Dune		
2021	Viewpoint	Greg Sullivan	
2022	The Bastard Son & The Devil Himself	Bjorn	
2024	A Gentleman in Moscow	Mishka	
2025	Down Cemetery Road	Amos	
TBA	The Husbands†	TBA	Upcoming series

=== Video games ===
Year	Title	Role	Notes
2022	The Dark Pictures Anthology: The Devil in Me	Mark Nestor (voice)	
