= Transferts =

French television series

- Genre: Thriller; science fiction
- Created by: Claude Scasso; Patrick Benedek
- Screenplay by: Claude Scasso; Patrick Benedek
- Directed by: Olivier Guignard; Antoine Charreyron
- Starring: Arieh Worthalter; Brune Renault
- Composer: David Imbault
- Country of origin: France
- Original language: French
- No. of seasons: 1
- No. of episodes: 6

Production
- Executive producer: Alain Bonnet
- Producers: Patrick Benedek; Joël Santoni; Sébastien Leray; Christophe Louis
- Cinematography: Pascal Lagriffoul
- Editor: Mathieu Doll
- Running time: 58 minutes
- Production companies: Arte; Filmagine; Panama Productions; Be Films

Original release
- Network: Netflix
- Release: 16 November – 23 November 2017

Transferts ([tʁɑ̃s.fɛʁ], "transfers") is a French science fiction thriller television series created by Claude Scasso and Patrick Benedek in 2017. The show aired for one season on Netflix.

== Synopsis ==
In the near future, Florian, a cabinetmaker and father of two, is taking a trip on a sailboat with his family, when he falls into the water and sinks. He wakes up after five years of being in a coma, in the body of Sylvain, a police captain at the BATI, a special division that tracks down "transferred" people. These are individuals whose spirit, or self, has been transferred from one body to another using a new medical procedure. Originally legalized for therapeutic purposes, "transfers" have since become prohibited following rejections called "counter-transfers", in which transferred patients experience a form of psychosis and turn violent.

== Cast and characters ==
- Arieh Worthalter as Captain Sylvain Bernard/Florian Bassot
- Brune Renault as Lieutenant Béatrice Lourmel
- Toinette Laquière as Sophie Bassot
- Steve Tientcheu as Captain Gabriel Finan
- Pili Groyne as Liza/Woyzeck
- Patrick Descamps as Vincent Mareuil
- Patrick Raynal as Dr. Michel Vautier
- Xavier Lafitte as Father Luc
- Juliette Plumecocq-Mech as Fausto
- Emilien Vekemans as Fabrice Bernard
- Aïssatou Diop as Viviane Metzger
- Balthazar Monfé as Thomas Bassot
- Zélie Rixhon as Julie Bassot
- Sébastien Chassagne as Damien Volber
- Thierry Frémont as Paul Dangeac
- Alexis Loret as Florian Bassot
- Marie Kremer as Oriane Mareuil
- Édith Scob as Alexandra Staniowska
- Jean-Marie Winling as Alexandre Syrmay
- Bastien Bouillon as Gaëtan Syrmay/Alexandre Syrmay
- Camille Voglaire as Clara
- David Quertigniez as Jacques Lantier

== Filming ==
Although set in France, the series was filmed in Brussels, Belgium from April to June 2016. Prominent landmarks which can be seen in the show include the church of Saint John the Baptist at the Béguinage, the Centre for Fine Arts, the Temple of Human Passions, and the dam at Eau d'Heure lakes.

The 2016 Brussels bombings on the eve of filming complicated the street scenes and the staging of an armed militia.

== Reception ==
The series received an excellent critical response in France. Le Parisien wrote that it is "a gem of science fiction with a fascinating scenario, a neat universe, and excellent actors. Finally some real (and good) French science fiction!", addedTélé-Loisirs. Télé 7 Jours wrote that it was a "...genre that is rarely seen on French television", and added that the show "stimulates some philosophical questioning". La Croix opined that Transferts "raises many questions that resonate with current events and takes a critical look at the abuses that lie in wait for us: commodification of the body, security escalation…". According to Le Monde, "The six episodes imagined by Claude Scasso and Patrick Benedek are appropriate for the time. They are a compilation of all contemporary social fears." Télérama added, "Transferts creates a universe, explores a theme, deploys a philosophical question, and does not forget the notion of entertainment."

== Recognition ==
- Festival Séries Mania 2017
  - Best series
  - Best actor for Arieh Worthalter
