= Sophia Brown (actress) =

English actress (born 1991)

- Born: Sophia Monique Brown; October 1991 (age 35); Northampton, England
- Education: ArtsEd
- Occupation: Actress
- Years active: 2015–present
- Known for: The Witcher: Blood Origin

Sophia Monique Brown (born October 1991) is an English actress whose credits include Marcella and Clique (2018), Giri/Haji (2019), The Capture (2020), The Witcher: Blood Origin (2022), You & Me (2023), Down Cemetery Road (2025), and Waiting for the Out (2026).

== Early life ==
Brown was born in Northampton. She graduated from Arts Educational Schools, London, and the Identity School of Acting in Brixton, where she trained in ballet, jazz, and contemporary dance. She also studied at the Ivana Chubbuck Studio. She has been performing with the Theo Adams Company since 2015.

== Career ==
In 2015, Brown made her debut television appearance as Leyla Farnworth in an episode of Casualty.

Her other TV credits include The Capture, Marcella, Clique, and Guerrilla.

She has appeared in the films Disobedience and Beauty and the Beast.

In 2019, she appeared as the assassin Donna Clarke in the BBC 2 crime drama television series Giri/Haji, working alongside Charlie Creed-Miles, who played her boss.

In 2021, Brown was cast as Éile, a warrior blessed with the voice of a goddess in The Witcher: Blood Origin, a four-episode limited series that is a prequel-spin-off to the Netflix show The Witcher.

In 2023, she starred in the ITVX comedy drama You & Me. In 2025, she appeared in the Apple TV series Down Cemetery Road. In 2026, she acted in Waiting for the Out.

== Selected filmography ==
List of film and television appearances, with year, title, and role shown
Year	Title	Role	Notes
2015	Casualty	Leyla Farnworth	Episode: "Heart Over Head"
2016	EastEnders	Amelle Ellington	Episode #1.5257
2017	Disobedience	Photographic studio assistant	Film
2017	Guerrilla	Christine	2 episodes
2017	Beauty and the Beast	Debutante	Film
2017–2018	Clique	Louise Taggart	Main role
2018	Marcella	DC Leanne Hunter	Main role (series 2)
2019	Giri/Haji	Donna Clark	Main role
2019–2020	The Capture	Karen Merville	Main role (series 1)
2021	I Am...	Tara	Episode: "I Am Danielle"
2022	The Witcher: Blood Origin	Éile	Main role
2023	You & Me	Jess	3 episodes
2023	Dead Shot	Ruth	Film
2024	Hard Truths	Aleisha	Film
2025	Down Cemetery Road	Ella Downey	2 episodes
2026	Waiting for the Out	Natasha Morgan	2 episodes
