= Encounter (2021 film) =

- Promotional release poster
- Directed by: Michael Pearce
- Written by: Michael Pearce; Joe Barton
- Produced by: Dimitri Doganis; Piers Vellacott; Derrin Schlesinger
- Starring: Riz Ahmed; Octavia Spencer; Janina Gavankar; Rory Cochrane; Lucian-River Chauhan; Aditya Geddada
- Cinematography: Benjamin Kračun
- Edited by: Maya Maffioli
- Music by: Jed Kurzel
- Production companies: Amazon Studios; Film4; Raw; Automatik Entertainment; Big Indie Pictures
- Distributed by: Amazon Studios
- Release dates: September 3, 2021 (Telluride); December 3, 2021 (United States)
- Running time: 108 minutes
- Countries: United Kingdom; United States
- Language: English

Encounter (stylized as ENCOUИTƎЯ) is a 2021 crime drama thriller film, directed by Michael Pearce from a screenplay by Pearce and Joe Barton. The film stars Riz Ahmed, Octavia Spencer, Janina Gavankar, Rory Cochrane, Lucian-River Chauhan, and Aditya Geddada.

Encounter had its world premiere at the 48th Telluride Film Festival on September 3, 2021, and was released in a limited release on December 3, 2021, by Amazon Studios prior to streaming on Prime Video on December 10, 2021.

== Plot ==
U.S. Marine Malik Khan has two young boys, Jay and Bobby. At home, Jay and Bobby are living with their mother Piya and their mother's new partner, Dylan. Piya has been feeling sick recently, and Dylan ominously tells them it is 'a bug'.

One night, Malik appears at their house, wakes up his two sons, and urgently tells them that they are going on a road trip. While on the road with his boys, Malik passes a police car and tells his boys to get down. Hours later, Malik is pulled over by a different cop. Though Malik is polite, the cop is hostile and aggressive, and Malik sees something shifting behind his eyes. Malik determines the cop has been infected by a parasitic organism from another planet. Malik wrestles the gun away from the cop, knocks him out, and leaves him in the street.

Back on the road, Malik confesses to his boys that this is not a road trip, but a rescue mission. He says that an alien parasite has taken over the planet and that their mother has been infected. As much as half the population may be infected by this alien parasite, which is using human bodies to reproduce. Malik needs to get his boys to safety and says they can protect themselves from the parasites with bug spray.

In a grocery store, Jay starts to question Malik's story. Later, Malik learns his boys' mother is pregnant after his sons say Piya has been getting sick in the morning and having weird food cravings. When Malik calls his parole officer Hattie, it's revealed that he missed his psychiatric evaluation. Malik refuses to tell Hattie where he is but asks Hattie to check on his ex-wife. Piya and Dylan are found tied up in the garage, but alive.

Hattie works with federal law enforcement in an attempt to retrieve Jay and Bobby. The feds believe Malik will kill his children and then himself. Hattie speaks to a former Marine friend of Malik's, who describes the assault incident that caused Malik to get dishonorably discharged from the Marine Corps. While describing how terrible the conditions were, he mentions that they were "getting eaten alive by bugs" and then found bodies of children in the wreckage. This incident caused Malik to snap. Hattie deduces that Malik is suffering from a mental disorder.

Jay begins to suspect the aliens are not real when his father sees hundreds of meteors in the sky that Jay does not see. After they get a flat tire, Malik tries to steal a car but gets in an altercation with an old man who is the owner of the car. Malik gets away, gravely wounding the man, but is injured. Malik teaches Jay how to drive in order to get them to safety. While Malik sleeps off his injury in an abandoned house, Jay drives to get his father medicine and food. Jay overhears on the radio that his father is a wanted man for kidnapping his two children. Back at the abandoned house, Jay confronts his father. Malik admits that he lied, that he was in prison for two years, and that his brain has been playing tricks on him.

The sons of the man Malik attacked track him down. The men kidnap Bobby and attempt to perform a citizen's arrest. Almost immediately, they open fire on Malik and Jay. Malik manages to apprehend both men without killing them and escapes with his boys.

Malik calls his ex-wife and gives her an address of a diner where he will leave the boys, telling her he will not go back to prison. However, while the police and helicopters start chasing his car, Malik realizes Jay has hidden in the back seat. Jay refuses to leave his dad behind, even after an hours-long standoff with the police. Hattie insists to Malik that the authorities will take his mental health into consideration when deciding his fate, but Malik does not believe her.

Not wanting to lose his father, Jay runs out of the car and points a gun at the police. Malik tries to distract the police to save his son, and then convinces him to put the gun down and run to him. They embrace, with the police lowering their weapons.

== Cast ==
- Riz Ahmed as Malik Khan
- Octavia Spencer as Hattie Hayes
- Rory Cochrane as Shepard West
- Janina Gavankar as Piya Khan
- Lucian-River Chauhan as Jay Khan
- Aditya Geddada as Bobby Khan
- Misha Collins as Dylan
- Shane McRae as Lance Dunn
- Antonio Jaramillo as Raúl
- Keith Szarabajka as Grant
- Brennan Keel Cook as Dwight McKinley
- Bill Dawes as Kurt McKinley
- Stefan S. Sims as Ernie

== Production ==
In October 2018, it was announced Michael Pearce would direct the film from a screenplay by himself and Joe Barton, with Film4 Productions and Raw set to produce. In July 2020, Riz Ahmed and Octavia Spencer joined the cast of the film, with Amazon Studios set to distribute. In September 2020, Janina Gavankar joined the cast of the film. In October 2020, Rory Cochrane joined the cast of the film. In November 2020, Lucian-River Chauhan and Aditya Geddada joined the cast of the film. Principal photography began in October 2020.

== Release ==
Encounter had its world premiere at the Telluride Film Festival with an international premiere at the Toronto International Film Festival. By the end of its run, the film will have screened at film festivals in Chicago, London, and Philadelphia. It was released in a limited release on December 3, 2021, prior to being released on Prime Video on December 10, 2021.

=== Critical response ===
The review aggregator website Rotten Tomatoes sampled 125 critics and judged 54% of the reviews to be positive, with an average rating of 6.00/10.
