= Voltaire High =

French television series

- Mixte
- Genre: Drama
- Directed by: Alexandre Castagnetti; Edouard Salier
- Starring: Léonie Souchaud; Lula Cotton Frapier; Anouk Villemin; Nathan Parent; Baptiste Masseline; Gaspard Meier-Chaurand; Nina Meurisse; Maud Wyler
- Country of origin: France
- Original language: French
- No. of seasons: 1
- No. of episodes: 8

Original release
- Network: Amazon Prime Video
- Release: June 14, 2021

Voltaire High (French: Mixte, lit. 'Mixed') is a French television series created by Marie Roussin and released by Amazon Prime Video on June 14, 2021. Voltaire High follows the adventures of Michèle, Annick and Simone as they join an all-boys' high school alongside 8 other girls in the early 1960s, at the beginning of co-education.

== Cast and characters ==
=== Main characters ===
- Léonie Souchaud as Michèle Magnan
- Lula Cotton-Frapier as Annick Sabiani
- Anouk Villemin as Simone Palladino
- Nathan Parent as Henri Pichon
- Baptiste Masseline as Jean-Pierre Magnan, Michèle's big brother
- Gaspard Meier-Chaurand as Alain Laubrac, ward of the State
- Pierre Deladonchamps as Paul Bellanger, Voltaire's chief supervisor
- Nina Meurisse as Camille Couret, English teacher
- Maud Wyler as Jeanne Bellanger, Voltaire's nurse

=== Supporting characters ===
- Arthur Legrand as Jean Dupin
- François Rollin as Mr Jacquet, the headteacher
- Gérald Laroche as Louis Douillard, Latin teacher
- Anne Le Ny as Hélène Giraud, history teacher
- Vassili Schneider as Joseph Descamps
- Antoine Werner as Didier Felbec
- Dimitri Fouque as Charles Vergoux
- Enzo Monchauzou as Yves Lamazière
- Adil Mekki as Ahmed Belkacem
- Gaspard Gevin-Hié as Daniel Applebaum
- Maxime d'Aboville as Émile Marcelin, French and philosophy teacher
- Martial Courcier as Raymond Meyer, chemistry teacher
- Rémi Pedevilla as Lucien Moreau, PE teacher
- Camille Charbeau as Maurice Vannel, Voltaire's supervisor
- Edouard Michelon as Léon De Goff, maths teacher
- Antoine Pelletier as Serge Casiro
- Francis Leplay as René Herman, biology teacher
- Margot Bancilhon as Denise, Jeanne Bellanger's girlfriend
- Emilien Vekemans as Roger Lagarrigue
- Karen Alyx as Germaine Magnan
- Christophe Kourotchkine as Gérard Magnan
- Meylie Vignaud as Martine Gomez
- Louis Ould-Yaou as Yves, blouson noir gang member
- Amira Casar as Irène
- Anne Le Guernec as Alice (Ep 5)
- Valentine Poorteman as Genevieve Lautret

== Filming locations ==
- Voltaire High: Abbaye royale, Saint-Jean-d'Angély, France
- Magnan Butcher: 9 rue de Verdun, Saint-Jean-d'Angély, France

== Episodes ==
No.	Title	Original release date
1	"Episode 1"	June 14, 2021
It is September 1963, and for the first time, Voltaire High is welcoming girls among its male student body. If the Principal is convinced with this progress, Vice-Principal Bellanger does not share the same opinion. Boys misbehave with girls and in one such incident, they prank Bellanger's niece Michele by dropping a bucket of water on her. Michele's brother, who is a senior, confronts the boy and in the fight hits him so hard that he loses an eye. There are discussions to remove the girls from school but finally Bellanger convinces the staff otherwise with his confidence. Bellanger and his wife Jeanne who is school nurse try to manage conflicts between boys and girls. Jeanne is shown to go out for a movie with another woman whom she also kisses.
2	"Episode 2"	June 14, 2021
Today is the first day of Physical Ed. It is also the day of the disciplinary board hearing for Bellanger's nephew Jean-Pierre. Bellanger has to keep a close eye on the hearing and on Miss Couret, who debuts as an English teacher.
3	"Episode 3"	June 14, 2021
This week, the students will work on an exposé in pairs. Simone has a crush on Jean-Pierre and Michèle targets a good grade. Annick bumped into her mum's new boyfriend but does not feel comfortable with him. The student-teacher soccer game is pending and for the first time, a woman will join the teachers' team.
4	"Episode 4"	June 14, 2021
Somewhat workaholic Bellanger hastens to school after the Christmas break. But today, boys have a curious behavior. Michèle wants to know what "makes you blind" and can't stand the feeling of being put aside because of her gender. When the meaning is revealed during class, Couret and Bellanger have to team up to sort themselves out of this disciplinary issue.
5	"Episode 5"	June 21, 2021
Tonight, Jeanne and Denise went to the theater. There, Jeanne falls under the charm of Irène, lead actress in the play. On her way back home, Denise bumped into Bellanger who confides in her his struggle to get close to a woman. Meanwhile, Camille's family incites her to get back to her husband Francis and therefore, cancel her request for divorce.
6	"Episode 6"	June 21, 2021
Annick can't bear the idea of dissecting frogs in class. So she challenges the boys with a bet: whoever sets free the frogs will have 1h of one-to-one tutoring with her. Simone suggests Michèle steals the frogs to prove to the boys she is not a goody-two-shoes. But Simone has severe cramps and a worried Jeanne takes her to the hospital.
7	"Episode 7"	June 21, 2021
Michèle is upset that Simone lied to her about the identity of her boyfriend. In an attempt to be accepted by the cool kids, Michele reveals her aunt Jeanne's sexual orientation and the rumors take off. Jean-Pierre is under pressure to win the regional Latin contest, a big step towards higher education for a butcher's son.
8	"Episode 8"	June 21, 2021
Michèle disappeared and her parents are panic-stricken. The Principal is embarrassed by the rumors Michèle spread about Jeanne, it could ruin the reputation of the school. Bellanger starts looking for his niece and her paramour, he is worried because they are young but he also admires their courage. Pichon organizes a surprise-party at his parents' house to celebrate the end of the school year.

== Awards ==
Voltaire High
Review scores
Source	Rating
IMDb	8/10 stars

Voltaire High received rave reviews in France and around the globe. It has been called "delicious", novel, cross-generational, and groundbreaking. After its success on Prime Video, the series went on to win the Prix du public de la série française (Prize of the public for a French television series) at the Canneseries Festival, ahead of other French hits like Lupin. Executive producers Eleonore Dailly and Édouard de Lachomette, who focus on promoting outstanding female voices, championed the modern take of the series on parity and the 1960s sexual revolution: "These educated girls were the trailblazers that helped empower their peers. It shocked me when I found out that French women were forbidden to have their own bank accounts until 1965. It's crucial for us as producers to enable stories of hope and change in our rather tormented times."
