= The Lazarus Project (TV series) =

2022 British science fiction TV series

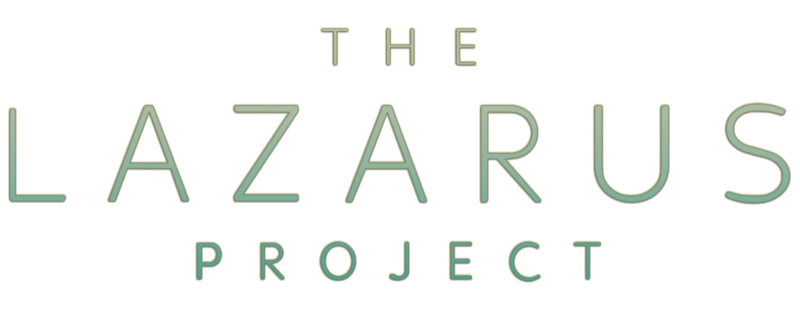
- Genre: Science fiction; Action; Thriller; Drama
- Created by: Joe Barton
- Written by: Joe Barton
- Starring: Paapa Essiedu; Anjli Mohindra; Rudi Dharmalingam; Charly Clive; Caroline Quentin; Tom Burke; Brian Gleeson; Vinette Robinson; Alec Utgoff
- Theme music composer: Ben Lukas Boysen
- Country of origin: United Kingdom
- Original language: English
- No. of series: 2
- No. of episodes: 16

Production
- Executive producers: Joe Barton; Johnny Capps; Marco Kreuzpaintner; Julian Murphy
- Producer: Adam Knopf
- Cinematography: Phillip Haberlandt
- Editors: Johannes Hubrich; Anil Griffin
- Running time: 52 minutes
- Production company: Urban Myth Films

Original release
- Network: Sky Max
- Release: 16 June 2022 – 15 November 2023

The Lazarus Project is a British science fiction television series created by Joe Barton and starring Paapa Essiedu. The series premiered on 16 June 2022 on Sky Max. In August 2022, it was renewed for a second series, which premiered on 15 November 2023. In March 2024, the show was cancelled after two series.

== Synopsis ==
=== Series 1 ===
George awakes on the morning of 1 July 2022. Six months later, he awakens and discovers that it is 1 July again, but neither his girlfriend Sarah nor anyone else seems to notice. Another six months later, it reverts to 1 July, and he is approached by Archie, a mysterious woman who invites him to the secret office of the Lazarus Project. George learns that he is one of only 0.000001% of the population with a mutant gene that grants the possibility of organically remembering that reverts are occurring.

He joins the project team, which works to prevent apocalyptic threats by observing their causes, then using a black hole to instigate a time reset (always back to the most recent 1 July, thus the calendar can move forward if no reset is needed) to address their causes. The team works on a scale starting with the minimum amount of adjustments, escalating through diplomacy, physical intervention, or even implementing a large scale (small, when compared to an apocalypse) amount of death and destruction.

In mid-2023, Sarah is killed after being struck by a garbage truck, an incident that George had prevented prior to the reset but was unable to stop due to being distracted by a phone call from Archie. With the following 1 July "too late to reset this year" point approaching, and no pending apocalyptic threat requiring a reset by the Lazarus team, George breaks every rule of the Lazarus Project by instigating a full nuclear war between Russia and America to save one person, rather than millions or billions. The project lead, Wes, triggers a reset and the team succeeds (mostly because George simply does not repeat his previous actions) in preventing the war. However, the team then has to deal with the unintended cascading consequences of George's original selfish action.

At the end of the first series, as 1 July 2024 approaches and with other repercussions still unfolding, the team is stunned to learn that the Chinese have apparently attempted to build their own time reset mechanism, creating a second nearby black hole which conflicts with the original Lazarus black hole and plunges the universe into a self-triggering, endless, three week time loop – reverting back from every 21 July 2024.

=== Series 2 ===
At the start of the second series, George gives Sarah the memory serum, and Wes recruits her to the Lazarus Project. The Lazarus team learns of the Time Break Initiative, the multinational organization responsible for creating the second singularity. The Initiative, led by Wes' husband Lerner, has been building and perfecting a Time Machine since (at least) the early 2010s, and their test on 21 July 2024 is responsible for creating the second black hole and the self-triggering three week time loop. Realizing that the loop will eventually unravel the universe irreversibly, the Initiative kidnaps genius former Lazarus agent Janet and her daughter Becky, sending them back to 1 July 2012 so that Janet can help the scientific genius behind the Initiative perfect her equations, hoping to prevent the universe-ending events of 2024.

In 2024, the Lazarus team uses the next 35+ loops (an accumulation of 2 years of experience for those able to remember the loops) to learn of, then track down, the sole surviving Time Break Initiative scientist, Samson. Wes sends George, Sarah, Samson and four other Lazarus agents back to 2023, but she secretly reprograms the mission with a secret directive, resulting in an accidental arrival in 2018. The team discovers that Wes intended for the team to travel to 1 July 2012 and for Dane to kill the eight scientists (including 2024 Janet and 2012 Samson) who have expertise regarding the time machine technology, before it is fully developed. After several tries, the team manages to escape 2018 and resumes travel to 2012 with the intention of rescuing 2024 Janet and—if possible—the remaining time travel scientists to prevent their assistance to the Time Breakers Initiative. However, Sarah betrays the team and kills the scientists and 2024 Janet herself, after 2012 Wes and the team's actions convince her that the technology is too dangerous to exist. George abandons 2024 Sarah and flees with the only survivors, including two versions of Becky, and the Dane to 22 July 2024 – the universe-threatening loop is broken. In 2024, George finds 2024 Sarah is alive and lived through the intervening 12 years; Sarah has since taken over from Wes as leader of the Lazarus Project.

== Cast and characters ==
=== Main ===
- Paapa Essiedu as George, with the time-loop awareness gene
- Anjli Mohindra as Archie, who was recruited to the Lazarus team with a time-loop awareness serum
- Rudi Dharmalingam as Shiv, with the time-loop awareness gene
- Charly Clive as Sarah, George's wife (later reset) / fiancée (later reset) / Lazarus confidant (after he gives her the serum)
- Caroline Quentin as Elisabeth 'Wes' Wesley, Lazarus Project team lead
- Tom Burke as Dennis Rebrov, former Lazarus agent who comes to feel that humanity clearly wants apocalypse
- Brian Gleeson as Ross, Archie's teammate and lover, who dies forever while preventing an apocalypse
- Vinette Robinson as Janet, Rebrov's wife and a former Lazarus agent who shares his opinion of the project

=== Recurring ===
- Alec Utgoff as Rudy (series 1), an arms dealer who supplies George with a nuclear bomb
- Lorn Macdonald as Blake (series 1)
- Royce Pierreson as Bryson (series 2)
- Lukas Loughran as Erik "the Dane" Eriksen
- Salóme Gunnarsdóttir as Greta
- Enyi Okoronkwo as Laurence (series 1)
- Tommy Letts as Ryan (series 1)
- Elaine Tan as Zhang Rhui
- Bradley John as Reggie
- Priya-Rose Brookwell as 6-year-old Becky (series 2)
- Sam Troughton as Dr. Samson (series 2)
- Zoe Telford as Dr. Kitty Gray (series 2)
- Colin Salmon as Robin Lerner (series 2)
- Safia Oakley-Green as 18-year-old Becky (series 2)
- Dan Li as Dr. Li (series 2)

== Episodes ==
Series	Episodes	Originally released
1	8	16 June 2022
2	8	15 November 2023

=== Series 1 (2022) ===
No. overall	No. in series	Title	Directed by	Written by	Original release date
1	1	"Episode 1"	Marco Kreuzpaintner	Joe Barton	16 June 2022
An app developer convinces the bank manager to sanction a loan for his app named Hazard Lights. The app developer marries his girlfriend after she gets pregnant. Six months later, a virus named MERS-22 continues to spread. The app developer's wife gets sick and the app developer wakes up six months back in the past. The app developer, George, explains to his wife, Sarah about the repeating events but Sarah doesn't believe it and leaves. A woman who knows what's happening gives an address to George. In the next loop, George visits the address and the woman explains about the Lazarus Project and the time jumps / time travel. George agrees to join the Lazarus Project and meets Elizabeth Wesley, Greta, Blake, Eriksen / Dane and Shiv. George trains and works under the Lazarus Project. George manipulates Karl, Sarah's colleague, to invest in a company which is about to go bankrupt and Karl loses all his savings. George helps in finding a stolen nuclear missile which leads to an ex-Lazarus agent, Dennis Rebrov. The Lazarus agents try to stop Dennis but Dennis kills all the Lazarus agents except George and detonates the nuclear missile. Elizabeth orders to rest the loop and the Lazarus agents try to track down Dennis. Karl argues and pushes Sarah resulting in a truck hitting Sarah.
2	2	"Episode 2"	Marco Kreuzpaintner	Joe Barton	16 June 2022
In 2018, Lazarus agent Archie and another Lazarus Agent were on a mission which went wrong. At present, Sarah is admitted to a hospital and George sees visions from 2018 when George met Sarah at a party. Dennis Rebrov is captured and Archie consoles George. In 2018, Archie and another Lazarus agent tries to prevent World War III but fails again. Archie and another Lazarus agent loved each other. At present, Sarah informs George about another Lazarus agent, Janet and the problems with turning the time back. Shiv and George have a brief conversation and talk to Dennis. In 2018, Archie and another Lazarus agent, Ross, fail to prevent World War III during many loops. Archie breaks up with Jim to be with Ross. Ross lets the loop reset to save Archie which upsets Archie. In another loop, World War III is prevented but Ross dies. Elizabeth Wesley doesn't turn back time to save Ross despite Archie's pleadings. At present, Sarah dies at the hospital and George asks Dennis's help to turn back time to save Sarah.
3	3	"Episode 3"	Marco Kreuzpaintner	Joe Barton	16 June 2022
At present, the Lazarus agents find out that Virgil Isaacs, the leader of the Lost Glory might have the nuclear missile. George gets the location of the detonator from Dennis Rebrov. In 2017, Janet was pregnant with Dennis's child and the scan shows a baby boy. At present, George tips off the Lost Glory about their location being compromised and meets Janet with a girl child at the address Dennis gave. In 2017, Shiv kills a chemical weapons dealer who was revealed to be a decoy and Janet gives birth to a baby boy before the checkpoint. As the Lazarus agents are unable to track down the chemical weapons, Elizabeth Wesley orders to turn back the time despite Janet's and Dennis's pleadings. At present, Janet explains everything to George about what happened in 2017 and agrees to help George. In Prague, the Lazarus agents find the Lost Glory hideout empty and also find weird drawings. In 2017, as the time was turned back, Janet lost her baby boy. Eventually, Janet gets pregnant again and gives birth to a baby girl after the checkpoint. Janet stops working for Lazarus. In 2018, While trying to prevent World War III, the Lazarus turned back time many times which resulted in Janet going through pregnancy and child birth in every loop. Dennis demands Elizabeth to tell about how the loop works. When Elizabeth refuses, Dennis kills a Lazarus Agent, Faye and vows to destroy everything. At present, Janet explains everything to George about what happened in 2018 and gives the detonator to George before leaving.
4	4	"Episode 4"	Marco Kreuzpaintner	Joe Barton	16 June 2022
In 1981, 1987 and 1994, Shiv goes through the loops and tries to understand it. In 1994, Shiv uses the loop to bet and earn money but Shiv's uncle and Shiv's cousin dies. In the next loop, Shiv prevents the death of Shiv's uncle and Shiv's cousin. Elizabeth Wesley visits and recruits Shiv for Lazarus. In 2018, After Dennis kills Faye, Shiv shoots Dennis's leg and puts Dennis in a hospital. Shiv gives an hour for Janet to leave. Dennis kills a guard and escapes from the hospital. Janet escapes with her child. At present, George argues with Shiv and Archie. George locates the nuclear missile at Romania from the weird drawings of The Lost Glory. Shiv figures out George's plan. Shiv tracks down and chases George with the help of another Lazarus agent, Ryan. George kills Shiv and has Dennis kill Ryan.
5	5	"Episode 5"	Laura Scrivano	Joe Barton	16 June 2022
In 2011, Matthew Rogers tried to recruit Archie for a government organization, MI5. In 2014, Shiv recruits Archie for the Lazarus Project. At present, George is chased by Romania police department. George and Dennis tell Archie that Shiv is a mole in the Lazarus Project. Archie doesn't believe Shiv is a mole. In 2014, Shiv explains Archie about the time jumps. At present, George kills a policeman and a bystander. George represents himself as a member of the Lost Glory and meets Rudy, the caretaker of the nuclear missile. Archie breaks into Shiv's apartment and finds a picture of Shiv with Janet and Janet's child. Rudy and George transport the nuclear missile to Ruthenia.
6	6	"Episode 6"	Laura Scrivano	Joe Barton	16 June 2022
It is revealed that Rudy's team killed the actual caretaker of the nuclear missile and Rudy replaced the caretaker. Rudy's team follows the truck containing the nuclear missile. The truck breaks down and Rudy shoots George demanding the detonator but George manages to kill Rudy and Rudy's team. George detonates the nuclear missile. Archie helps George to get back to London. George shows Elizabeth Wesley the money transfers from Shiv's account to Janet's account. Elizabeth takes George to meet the Russian Ambassador, Belov. George visits Belov again and kills Belov which leads to a nuclear war. Elizabeth orders to reset the loop. George wakes up with Sarah.
7	7	"Episode 7"	Akaash Meeda	Joe Barton	16 June 2022
Shiv arrives at George's house but leaves after understanding that George framed everything on Shiv. Shiv goes into hiding. George talks to Karl about the investment and reassures that Karl's savings is still safe. The Lazarus still believe Shiv is the mole. The Lazarus tries to capture Dennis but Dennis kills the Lazarus Agents. George spends more time with Sarah. George asks Sarah for marriage but Sarah breaks up with George. Archie consoles George. The Lazarus locates Shiv at Hamburg, Germany after the death of several mercenaries and sends Archie and George to investigate. The Lazarus finds out that Zhnag Rui was also involved in the shootout. Shiv arrives at George's home and George kills Shiv. George destroys Shiv's dead body by blasting a car. Sarah informs George about her marriage to another man. A policeman arrests George on suspicion of a murder and the loop is reset.
8	8	"Episode 8"	Akaash Meeda	Joe Barton	16 June 2022
In 2012, Dennis and Janet confessed their love for eachother. At present, Janet was held captive by Zhang Rui. Shiv arrives to help Janet but Janet leaves with Zhang Rui leaving a cryptic message. Shiv brings Janet's cryptic message to warn but George kills Shiv. It is revealed that the world ended due to two black holes merging and the time was turned back. The Lazarus Project has only three weeks time to figure out a way to survive. George disposes of Shiv's dead body. In a loop, Archie is shot dead in Shanghai, China while trying to find Zhang Rui. Sarah sees George with Shiv's dead body. George explains about the Lazarus Project to Sarah. George and Sarah get intimate. George spends time with Sarah. In a loop, with the help of Zhang Rui's sister, Archie finds Zhang Rui but Zhang Rui kills herself. In a loop, it is revealed that Zhang Rui can remember time loops just like the Lazarus Agents. Zhang Rui reveals that Janet built another time machine. Zhang Zui doesn't know where Janet is and informs that George met Janet before. In a loop, George accidentally kills Sarah with a car. Archie finds out what George did and what happened to Shiv. In a loop, Zhang Rui finds the location of Janet. George gives Sarah a serum which will help to remember the time loops. Dennis arrives at George's house and seems to understand Janet's cryptic message. In a loop, George saves Shiv with the help of a neighbour, Reggie. Shiv says that Dennis is the key. Archie and Zhang Rui are unable to find Janet. Dennis arrives at the Lazarus headquarters and explains that someone managed to send Janet back to 2012. Sarah arrives at George's home after injecting herself with the serum.

=== Series 2 (2023) ===
No. overall	No. in series	Title	Directed by	Written by	Original release date
9	1	"Episode 1"	Carl Tibbetts	Joe Barton	15 November 2023
In a loop, Shiv kills Reggie and George explains everything to Elizabeth Wesley. Elizabeth fires George and recruits Sarah after explaining about the three week loop to Sarah. In a loop, George kills Reggie after saving Shiv. Sarah trains to become a Lazarus Agent. Archie explains to everyone about a group named the Time Break Initiative which includes six scientists, Dr. Samson, Dr. Wong, Dr. Morgenstein, Dr. Li, Dr. Gardner and Dr. Wheeler. The Lazarus agents try to find the scientists to create a new time machine for the Lazarus Project. Sarah gives the details of the scientists to George and George finds a lead on Dr. Wheeler. After several loops, George finds out that Dr. Wheeler is dead. In a loop, After informing about Dr. Wheeler's death, Elizabeth lets George work again for Lazarus. Zhang Rui and Archie find Dr. Li's deadbody and finds a lead on Dr. Samson. The Lazarus agents find Dr. Samson's dead body and George understands from Dr. Samson's ring that all the scientists where under Dr. Kitty Gary and Elizabeth is connected to Dr. Kitty Gray. George explains everything to Sarah, Shiv and Dennis Rebrov. In a loop, Dennis saves Dr. Samson and informs Elizabeth but dies. Janet was sent back in time to 2012 to work with Dr. Kitty Gary's team.
10	2	"Episode 2"	Carl Tibbetts	Joe Barton	15 November 2023
At present, Dr. Samson explains everything about the Time Break Initiative to Elizabeth Wesley. In 2012, the scientists started to work under Robin Lerner after Dr. Kitty Gray's death. In 2023, the scientists accidentally created a black hole while conducting a Time Travel Experiment. In 2024, the Time Break Initiative captures and sends Janet back in time to 2012 to work with Gray. At present, George and Sarah get intimate. Samson is given the serum to remember the time jumps. George thinks that a Lazarus Agent, Ross Keane, might have killed Gray on Elizabeth's orders. The Lazarus agents arrive at the location where the time machine was built to steal a neurotoxin / new serum which helps in time travel. Samson reveals to Zhang Rui that Janet's daughter, Becky was also sent back to 2012. George accidentally activates the time machine and a mysterious man can be seen. Zhang Rui and Archie kiss each other. In a loop, George meets Becky and the mysterious man, Bryson tries to kill George.
11	3	"Episode 3"	Carl Tibbetts	Joe Barton	15 November 2023
In 2024, Bryson was also sent back to 2012. At present, Becky explains everything to George but doesn't want to get involved with the Lazarus Project. Zhang Rui and Archie get intimate. Bryson kills Sarah and George. In a loop, Zhang Rui and Archie get intimate. Zhang Rui and Archie acquire the new serum needed for time travel. The Lazarus agents are injected with the new serum. George informs Dennis Rebrov about Becky to prevent Dennis from killing Zhang Rui. Becky informs Dennis and George that Janet was killed by Ross Keane, a Lazaus Agent. George, Dennis and Becky find instructions left by Janet to build a new time machine. Samson modifies a plane to travel back in time.
12	4	"Episode 4"	Carl Tibbetts	Joe Barton	15 November 2023
The Lazarus agents travel through time but end up in 2018 instead of 2023 due to a malfunction. Dane dies as the plane crashes. At the Lazarus Headquarters, Samson tries to fix the malfunction and Archie finds a confidential file about Ross Keane's mission titled Operation Midnight in 2012 to kill Dr. Kitty Gray. Ross kisses Archie. The Lazarus agents stay at a safehouse. George and Sarah talk about their relationship. At a store, George flirts with 2018 Sarah / Sarah 2. Archie kisses Zhang Rui and leaves to find Ross. 2018 Archie / Archie 2 gets intimate with Ross. Archie questions Ross about Operation Midnight and understands that Wes ordered Ross to kill Gray and Gray's team to prevent the creation of time travel. At a party, Sarah flirts with 2018 George / George 2. George disguises as George 2 to talk with Sarah. Zhang Rui finds out that Dane was sent to kill Gray's team and destroy the time machine. Bryson travelled back to 2018 as Bryson is somehow connected to George. Bryson kills George 2, Sarah 2, George and Sarah. Samson finds out that the computer was reprogrammed to 2012 instead of 2023. In a loop, Samson fixes the computer and the plane lands in 2012. Becky kills Dane after Dane accepts the mission to kill everyone and everything with the knowledge to build a time machine.
13	5	"Episode 5"	Pier Wilkie	Joe Barton	15 November 2023
It is revealed that Robin Lerner is an ex-Lazarus agent and Janet was also involved in Operation Midnight. In 2012, Janet finds out about Dr. Kitty Gray's time travel research and kills Gray. Gray's lab was destroyed with explosives but Ross and Janet couldn't find Gray's team. In 2024, Robin sends Janet back in time to 2012 to work with Gray and build a perfect time machine without any flaws. Janet arrived in 2012 and started working with Gray before Operation Midnight. It is revealed that Robin was funding Gray's research. Gray explains to Janet that Gray started to research time travel to meet a friend, Charlotte Weir who died due to cancer. Elizabeth Wesley attends a lecture of Gray and warns Gray to stop the research. Gray manages to fix the time machine without any side effects. Gray and Janet perform a successful time travel experiment with a rat. Gray informs Robin about the success and Elizabeth prepones Operation Midnight after knowing about Gray's success. 2012 Janet / Janet 2 and Ross attack Gray's lab. Bryson helps Becky to escape and Janet hides the instructions to build the time machine. Ross kills Gray and destroys Gray's lab with explosives. Bryson and Janet are killed. Robin keeps Gray's team safe. The Lazarus agents' plane landed in 2012 before Operation Midnight.
14	6	"Episode 6"	Pier Wilkie	Joe Barton	15 November 2023
15	7	"Episode 7"	Sean Spencer	Joe Barton	15 November 2023
The Bryson from Gray's lab is revealed to be alive and taken to the Lazarus Headquarters by Ross. Elizabeth Wesley orders Ross to bring 2012 Bryson / Bryson 2 to Lazarus HQ and orders Robin's death. Samson, George and Sarah infiltrate the Lazarus Headquarters. Elizabeth informs Bryson 2 about Robin's death. George and Sarah present Bryson from Gray's lab to Elizabeth. George kills Bryson 2 and Sarah convinces Elizabeth to turn the time back.
16	8	"Episode 8"	Sean Spencer	Joe Barton	15 November 2023

== Production ==
Produced by Urban Myth Films, the series features Marco Kreuzpaintner, Akaash Meeda, and Laura Scrivano as directors. Under its working title of Extinction, filming took place in second quarter of 2021 in Cardiff, Bristol,Prague and Postoloprty.

In February 2023, Empire printed first look images from the filming of the second series, with Colin Salmon, Royce Pierreson, Safia Oakley-Green, Lorne MacFayden, Zoe Telford, Sam Troughton and James Atherton having been added to the cast. Filming locations on the second series in Bristol included Old Market, Easton, Bedminster, Fishponds, Henbury, Clifton and St Paul's.

== Release ==
The first trailer was revealed in February 2022. The series premiered on 16 June 2022 on Sky Max and Now in the United Kingdom. The second series premiered on 15 November 2023.

In the United States, it premiered on 4 June 2023 on TNT. It was subsequently released on Netflix.

== Reception ==
=== Critical response ===
On the review aggregator website Rotten Tomatoes, The Lazarus Project holds an approval rating of 100% based on 13 reviews.

The series has received positive reviews for its storyline and performances. Lucy Mangan of The Guardian awarded it four stars out of five, praising the writing, tension created by the premise and cast. Nicole Vassell, writing for The Independent, gave it three stars, writing "Though a little under-explained and occasionally simplistic, The Lazarus Project has a bright concept behind it with satisfying bursts of action." The Daily Telegraph gave it three stars.

=== Accolades ===
The series won in the Best Special Effects category at the 2022 Royal Television Society Craft & Design Awards. In March 2024, Essiedu was nominated in the Best Leading Actor category at the 2024 British Academy Television Awards.

== See also ==
- List of films featuring time loops
