= You & Me (2023 British TV series) =

- Created by: Jamie Davis
- Directed by: Tom Vaughan
- Theme music composer: Vince Pope
- Country of origin: United Kingdom
- Original language: English

Production
- Executive producers: Dominic Treadwell-Collins; Alexander Lamb; Russell T Davies
- Producer: Michael Ray
- Production company: Happy Prince

Original release
- Network: ITVX
- Release: 23 February 2023

You & Me is a British three-part romantic comedy-drama television series written by Jamie Davis. It premiered on 23 February 2023.

== Cast ==
- Harry Lawtey as Ben
- Jessica Barden as Emma
- Sophia Brown as Jess
- Andi Osho as Pam
- Julie Hesmondhalgh as Linda
- Janie Dee as Hannah
- Dominic Mafham as Jeremy
- Lily Newmark as Joey
- Genesis Lynea as Dee
- Ben Starr as Harry
- Isabella Tyson as Poppy
- Lucas Tyson as Jack

== Episodes ==
No.	Title	Directed by	Written by	Original release date	U.K. viewers (millions)
1	"How We Used To Be"	Tom Vaughan	Jamie Davis	February 23, 2023	N/A
2	"Who's Emma?"	Tom Vaughan	Jamie Davis	February 23, 2023	N/A
3	"How Does The Story End?"	Tom Vaughan	Jamie Davis	February 23, 2023	N/A

== Production ==
In March 2021, ITV commissioned You & Me from actor Jamie Davis, marking Davis' screenwriting debut. The series would be executive produced by Dominic Treadwell-Collins of Happy Prince, Alexander Lamb, and Russell T Davies. Director Tom Vaughan would oversee the production.

It was announced in June 2022 that Harry Lawtey, Jessica Barden, and Sophia Brown would lead the series.

Principal photography took place on location in South East London in the summer of 2022.

== Release ==
You & Me was presented at the 2022 MIPCOM in Cannes. The series was released for streaming via ITVX on 23 February 2023, and had a traditional terrestrial broadcast on ITV2 between 4 and 6 September 2023.
