= Half Wild =

2015 young adult fantasy novel by Tautis

- First edition (US)
- Author: Sally Green
- Language: English
- Series: The Half Bad trilogy
- Genre: Young adult (fantasy)
- Publisher: Viking Press (US); Puffin Books (UK)
- Publication date: March 23, 2015 (US); March 24, 2015 (UK)
- Publication place: United Kingdom
- Media type: Print (hardback & paperback)
- Pages: 400pp (hardback, first edition)
- ISBN: 978-0-14-135088-2
- Preceded by: Half Bad
- Followed by: Half Lost

Half Wild is young adult fantasy novel, and the second book in the Half-Life trilogy by Sally Green. It was published on 24 March 2015 and is the sequel to Half Bad, which was released the previous year.

== Plot ==
Nathan is currently in Switzerland, living as a nomad. He has been unsuccessfully searching for the Fairborn, a knife that can only be used by Nathan's bloodline. His friend, Gabriel, is missing. Nathan meets Nesbitt, who is half fain and half Black witch. When they are ambushed by Hunters, Nesbitt catches one, while the other, Kieran, Annalise's brother, turns invisible. It is then that Nathan feels the animal in him, and he kills Kieran. The next day, Nesbitt brings Nathan to Van, his employer. Van informs Nathan that Soul, Annalise's uncle, has taken charge of the Council of White Witches and is letting a witch named Wallend experiment on Black witches.

== Sequel ==
The third and final book in the series, Half Lost, was released in March 2016.

== Reception ==
Half Wild has generally received favourable reviews. Kirkus Reviews said "Green delivers vibrant characters, and Nathan’s relationships arc in thrilling highs and lows." and "The start of his journey feels slow and too safe, but the climax ushers in a bloody, unforgettable cliffhanger." concluding "A character-driven page-turner offering both emotional depth and gory thrills." Publishers Weekly called it "riveting" and went on to say "Although this tale has some of the weaknesses inherent in bridge novels ..., it features the same powerful language, well-developed characters, fascinating magic, and harrowing action sequences as its predecessor and will leave its readers anxiously awaiting the final volume."

The Financial Times likened it to "a supercar endlessly revving at the kerb." and "Her witch-world seems to consist of board meetings interspersed with bouts of torture, spells and assassination." but then described it as "Harry Potter with a hard-on, in other words, and great fun." In a review for Booklist, Frances Bradburn wrote, "Once again, Green pushes the boundaries of definition; this time: What is wild? What is human or even civilized? The blood and gore, the willingness to endure and survive at any price, and the dichotomies between good and bad, love and hate, wild and civilized all haunt the reader, climaxing in a tragic ending that portends the horror, violence, and possible relationships in the trilogy’s final installment."

== Characters ==
Nathan Byrn. The 17-year-old protagonist. He has straight black hair, olive skin and black eyes. Raised in a family of White witches, he is half White and half Black. He can self-heal extraordinarily fast and transform into animals, much like his father, Marcus. He is the love interest of Annalise O'Brien, and later of Gabriel.

Gabriel Boutin. A Black witch stuck in the body of a fain until he is returned to his original witch body. Gabriel is tall and slim, has brown eyes and long, brown hair that falls to his shoulders. He also falls in love with Nathan in Half Bad, and his feelings remain, even though Nathan is with Annalise. There are also two short stories - "Half Lies" and "Half Truth" - from Gabriel's and his sister Michele's points of view about his past and how Gabriel ended up with Nathan.

Marcus. Nathan's father is the most feared Black witch of all time. He killed Nathan's siblings' father, among many others. His Gift is transforming into animals but he has also stolen Gifts from many other witches by killing them and eating their hearts.

Victoria Van Dal. A Black witch, her gift is making powerful potions. She becomes one of Nathan's most important allies in the rebellion against Soul O'Brien.

Nesbitt. Half Black, half Fain, Van's assistant. He is witty, charming, drinks and talks too much. Nathan originally dislikes him but grows fond of him as they live and journey together.

Mercury. A powerful Black witch who can control the weather and who holds Annalise prisoner, and will only release her in exchange for Nathan killing his father, Marcus.

Celia. A White witch, Nathan's former mentor with whom he was sent to live. She abused and locked him in a cage in the first book and Nathan has despised her ever since.

Soul O'Brien. The leader of the Council of White Witches and Annalise's uncle.

Mr. Wallend. An evil White witch who works for Soul and carries out gruesome experiments on Black witches.

Annalise O'Brien. A White witch, some months older than Nathan. She is Nathan's initial primary love interest. She also ran from her cruel family upon learning of their tolerance for the White witches' cruelty.

Jessica Byrn. Nathan's eldest half-sister who hates him, and a Hunter.
