= The Bastard Son & The Devil Himself =

Fantasy drama television series

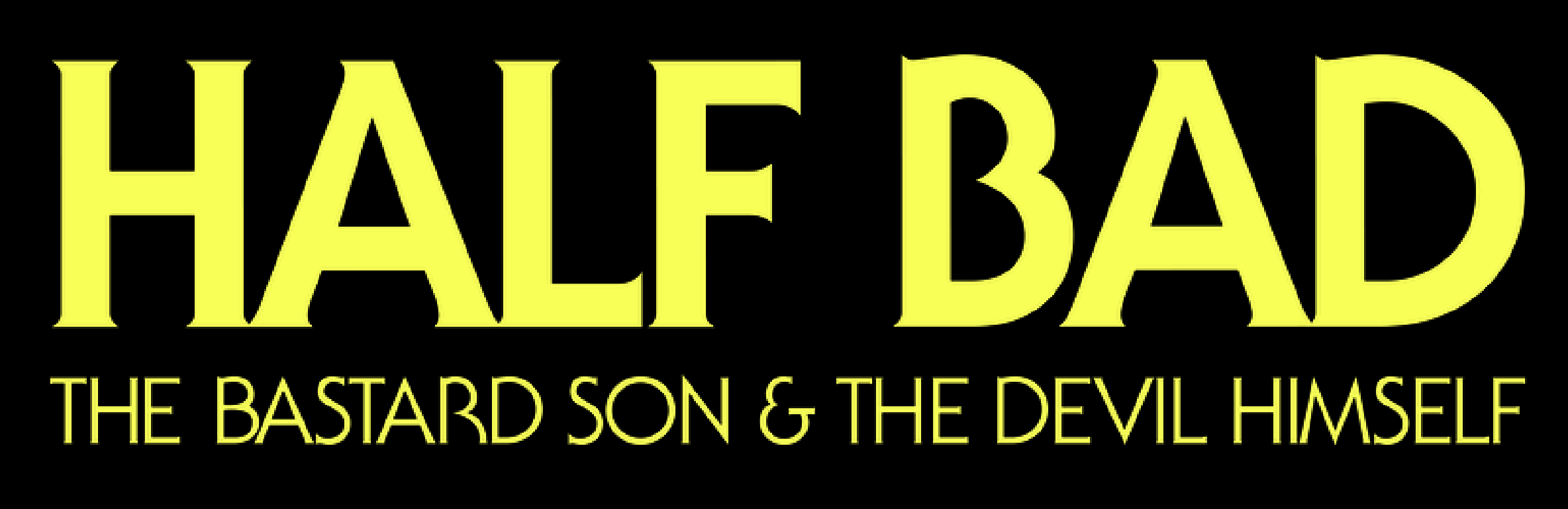
- Also known as: Half Bad: The Bastard Son & The Devil Himself
- Genre: Action-adventure; Fantasy drama
- Created by: Joe Barton
- Based on: Half Bad trilogy by Sally Green
- Directed by: Colm McCarthy; Debs Paterson; Rachna Suri
- Starring: Jay Lycurgo; Nadia Parkes; Emilien Vekemans; Isobel Jesper Jones; Karen Connell; Paul Ready; David Gyasi; Kerry Fox; Fehinti Balogun; Misia Butler; Liz White; Róisín Murphy; Tim Plester; Priya Kansara
- Music by: Rosa Walton; Jenny Hollingworth
- Country of origin: United Kingdom
- Original language: English
- No. of seasons: 1
- No. of episodes: 8

Production
- Executive producers: Andy Serkis; Jonathan Cavendish; Joe Barton; Colm McCarthy; Will Tennant; Phil Robertson
- Producers: Adrian Sturges; Steve Clarke-Hall
- Production locations: London, United Kingdom
- Cinematography: Nick Remy Matthews; David Higgs
- Production company: The Imaginarium

Original release
- Network: Netflix
- Release: 28 October 2022

The Bastard Son & The Devil Himself is a British fantasy drama television series created by Joe Barton, based on the novel Half Bad by Sally Green. The series tells the story of Nathan Byrne, a young man discovering his true identity as the illegitimate son of the dangerous witch Marcus Edge. Netflix released the series on 28 October 2022. It was met with positive reviews, although Netflix cancelled future episodes.

== Cast ==
- Jay Lycurgo as Nathan Byrne
- Nadia Parkes as Annalise O'Brien
- Emilien Vekemans as Gabriel
- Isobel Jesper Jones as Jessica Byrne
- Karen Connell as Ceelia
- Paul Ready as Soul O'Brien
- David Gyasi as Marcus Edge
- Kerry Fox as Esmie
- Fehinti Balogun as Bjorn
- Misia Butler as Niall
- Liz White as Penelope
- Róisín Murphy as Mercury
- Tim Plester as Rowan
- Priya Kansara as Flo
- Orla McDonagh as Young Ceelia

== Episodes ==
No.	Title	Directed by	Written by	Original release date
1	Episode 1	Colm McCarthy	Joe Barton	28 October 2022
Sixteen-year-old Nathan Bryne tries his best to fit in at school and at home, but his father's deadly legacy casts a long shadow.
2	Episode 2	Colm McCarthy	Joe Barton	28 October 2022
To prepare him for an eventual showdown with his father, Ceelia coaches Nathan on his fighting skills. Jessica makes an enemy during cadet training.
3	Episode 3	Colm McCarthy	Joe Barton	28 October 2022
Soul and a team of Hunter cadets look to escort Nathan to London, but they run into trouble along the way. Annalise grapples with her newfound power.
4	Episode 4	Colm McCarthy	Ryan J. Brown and Joe Barton	28 October 2022
Gabriel guides Nathan and Annalise through Paris in the hopes of finding Mercury, but a poorly kept secret threatens to end their camaraderie.
5	Episode 5	Rachna Suri	Dionne Edwards and Joe Barton	28 October 2022
Nathan and Annalise follow Gabriel through the French countryside, where they learn startling new information about Blood Witches from the Ozanne clan.
6	Episode 6	Rachna Suri	Helen Kingston	28 October 2022
Nathan tries to get Ceelia to see the truth about Soul and later experiences a chilling vision. Jessica gets promoted and embraces her ruthless streak.
7	Episode 7	Debs Paterson	Emer Kenny	28 October 2022
Soul and Jessica head to Wolfhagen with Annalise and Ceelia in pursuit. Gabriel tries to convince Nathan to see Mercury instead.
8	Episode 8	Debs Paterson	Joe Barton	28 October 2022
Soul goes on a rampage at Wolfhagen, eager to finally hunt down Marcus. Nathan, Annalise and Gabriel race to stop him before it's too late.

== Development ==
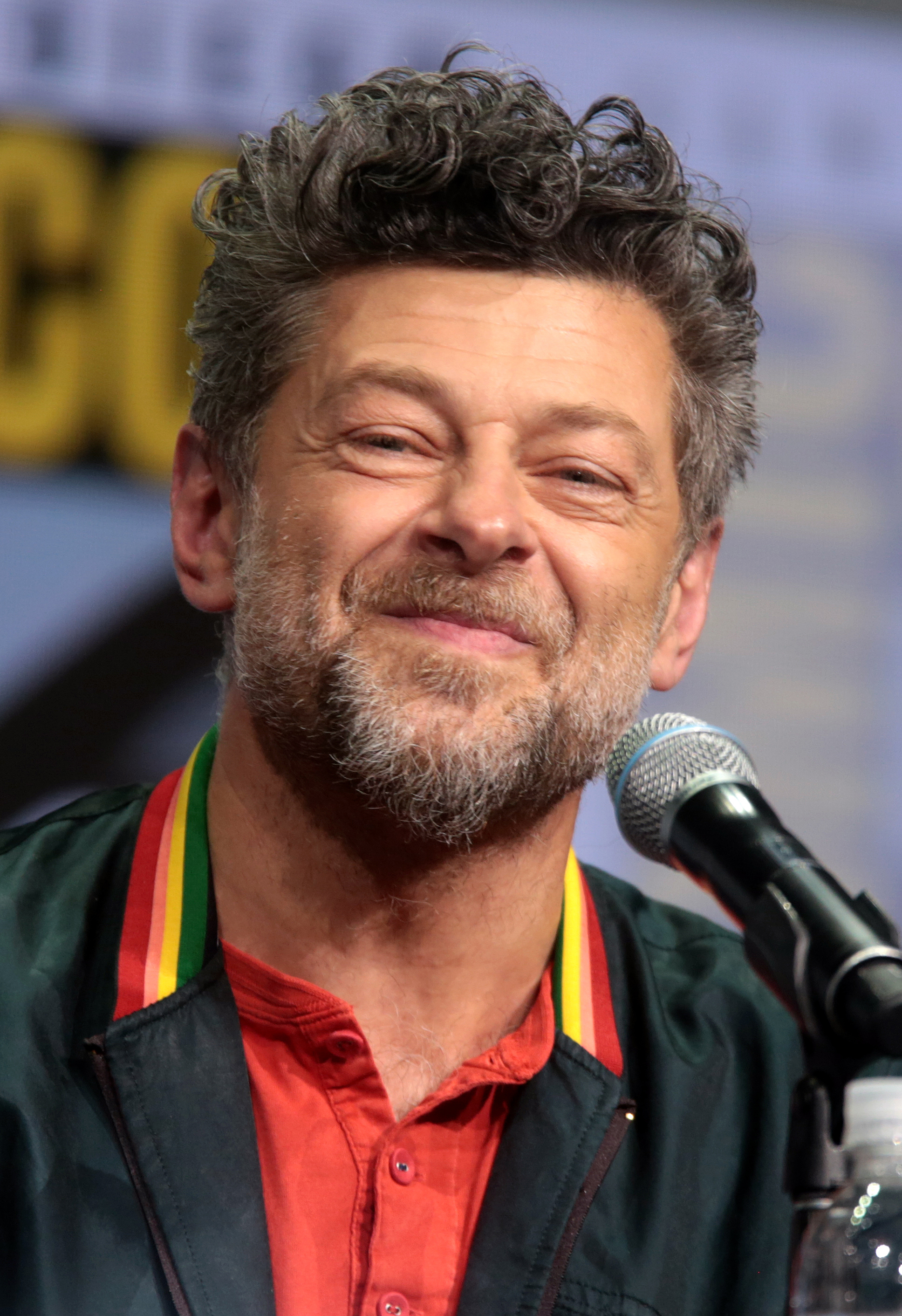
Andy Serkis, executive producer of The Bastard Son & The Devil Himself

A feature-film adaptation based on the first book in the popular British fantasy series was under development at Fox 2000 on 5 April 2013. It was reported that Karen Rosenfelt, who had produced The Twilight Saga, Percy Jackson: Sea of Monsters, and The Book Thief, would be in charge of production, but there were no further updates published by the studio . On 13 December 2020, Netflix announced the production of a young adult television series based on the trilogy. The adaptation would be written and executive produced by Joe Barton, who would also act as showrunner. Joining Barton as executive producers would be Andy Serkis, Jonathan Cavendish and Will Tennant, with Serkis' own production company, Imaginarium Productions co-producing the series. The first season was reported to be eight one-hour episodes.

Netflix tweeted the series title, The Bastard Son & The Devil Himself, on 25 August 2022. On 21 September 2022, Colm McCarthy, Debs Paterson, and Rachna Suri were announced as directors of the series, with McCarthy also executive producing, Phil Robertson of Imaginarium as executive producer, and Adrian Sturges and Steve Clark-Hall as producers.

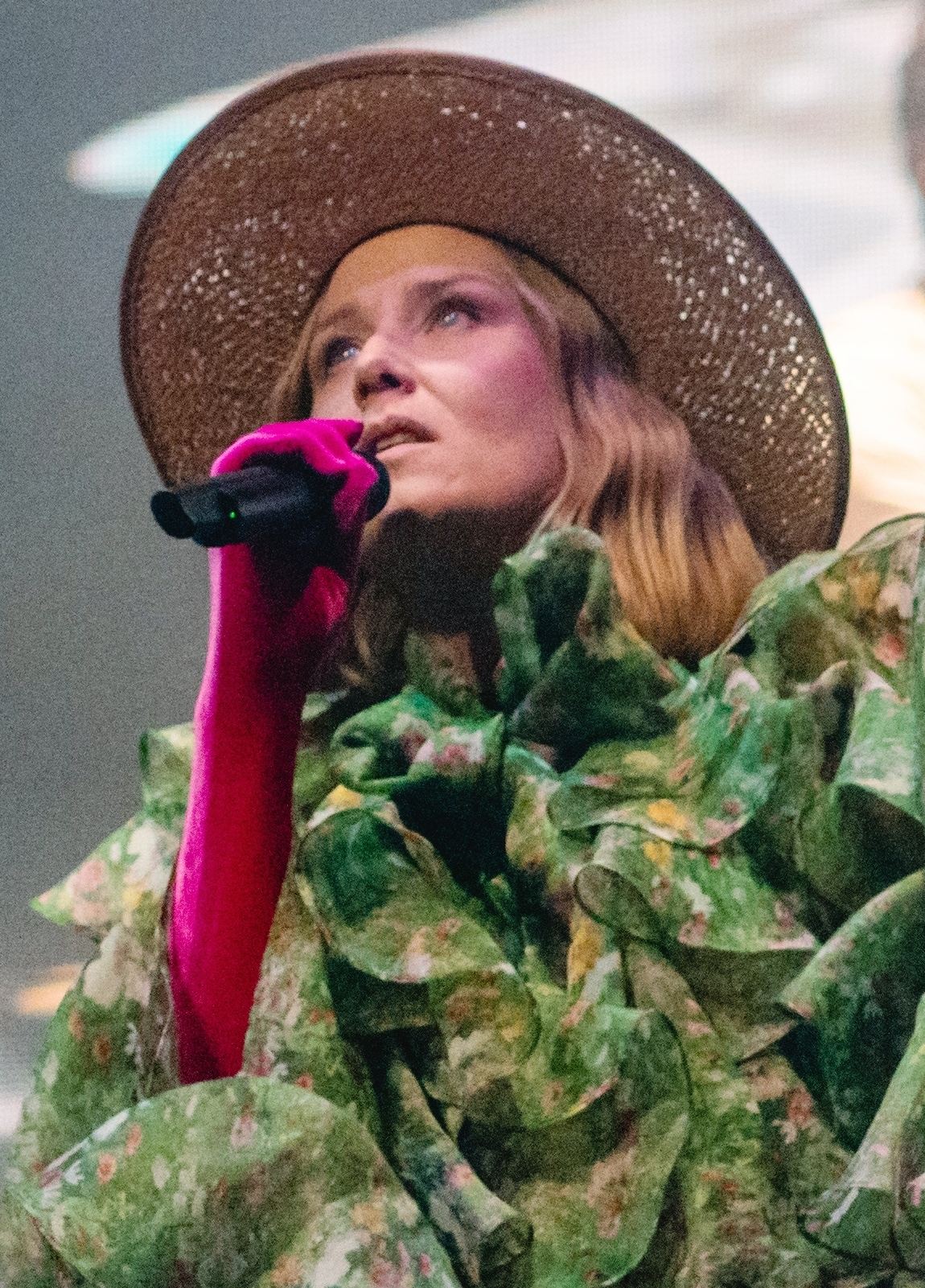
Róisín Murphy joins the main cast as Mercury, making this series her acting debut

Jay Lycurgo, Nadia Parkes, Emilien Vekemans, Isobel Jesper Jones and Karen Connell were announced as leads on 18 March 2022. Paul Ready, David Gyasi, Kerry Fox, Fehinti Balogun, Misia Butler, Liz White and Róisín Murphy also joined the main cast. Principal photography of the series began on 5 July 2021, with the majority of shooting taking place in London, UK. David Higgs was announced as the series' cinematographer, and Elen Lewis and Tom Chapman as editors.

Rosa Walton and Jenny Hollingworth of Let's Eat Grandma composed an original soundtrack for the first season. The duo shared in an interview that after reading the initial script they felt it would be compatible with their musical style. They cited various folklore and fairy tales as inspirations, in addition to the soundtracks from Under the Skin and Utopia.

Netflix released a series trailer on 13 October 2022, and the series premiered on 28 October 2022.

== Reception ==
The Bastard Son & The Devil Himself received positive reviews from critics and audiences alike. On the review aggregator website Rotten Tomatoes, 94% of 16 critics' reviews are positive, with an average rating of 8.2/10. The website's consensus reads: "A fantasy series full of flair along with thoughtful insight, The Bastard Son & the Devil Himself is an exemplary YA adaptation." Metacritic, which uses a weighted average, assigned the film a score of 72 out of 100, based on four critics, indicating "generally favorable" reviews.

David Opie of Digital Spy rated the series 5/5 stars, praised the writing, visuals, and cast performances, especially from Jay Lycurgo and Emilien Vekemans. Jack Seale of The Guardian, gave the series 4/5 stars, praising its writing and visual effects, calling the latter "impressive" and "confusingly beautiful". Jack Taylor of The Telegraph, also rated the series 4/5 stars, similarly praised its writing, visuals and sounds, highlighting the "economic storytelling that made Giri/Haji such a captivating success," though criticizing the action scenes, calling them "dismally loud and boring". Sam Moore of Radio Times gave the series 3/5 stars, criticizing its tone, calling it "uneven" although praising the "snappy dialogue" and "stellar performances" of the casts. Joel Keller of Decider similarly criticized the tone, noting elements of "a typical teen-drama" while praising performances of the cast, particularly those of Nadia Parkes.
