= Down Cemetery Road =

British television series

- Promotional poster
- Genre: Thriller
- Based on: Down Cemetery Road by Mick Herron
- Developed by: Morwenna Banks
- Starring: Emma Thompson; Ruth Wilson; Adeel Akhtar; Darren Boyd; Nathan Stewart-Jarrett; Fehinti Balogun
- Country of origin: United Kingdom
- Original language: English
- No. of series: 1
- No. of episodes: 8

Production
- Executive producers: Mick Herron; Morwenna Banks; Emma Thompson; Jamie Laurenson; Hakan Kousetta; Tom Nash
- Producer: Emma Burge
- Running time: 48–54 minutes
- Production company: 60Forty Films

Original release
- Network: Apple TV
- Release: 29 October 2025 – present

Down Cemetery Road is a British television series based on the 2003 novel by Mick Herron, adapted by Morwenna Banks. The series premiered on 29 October 2025 on Apple TV. The second season was announced by Apple TV on 12 December 2025. The show involves a woman who hires a private investigator after an explosion occurs and a girl goes missing on the same night in a quiet suburb of Oxford.

== Cast and characters ==
=== Main ===
- Emma Thompson as Zoë Boehm, a misanthropic private investigator
- Ruth Wilson as Sarah Trafford (née Tucker), an art conservationist caught up in a criminal conspiracy in the aftermath of an explosion in her neighbourhood
- Adeel Akhtar as Hamza Malik, an officious military intelligence operator working under C on a black operation
- Darren Boyd as C, a senior official in the intelligence services overseeing a black operation
- Nathan Stewart-Jarrett as Michael Downey, a former soldier also investigating the events in Oxford
- Adam Godley as Joe Silvermann, an idealistic private investigator, husband of Zoë Boehm
- Tom Goodman-Hill as Gerard Inchon, an abrasive loud-mouth banker
- Fehinti Balogun as Amos Crane, a robotic and resourceful assassin
- Lydia Leonard as Talia Ross, a new government minister about to take office in the Ministry of Defence

=== Featured ===
- Sinead Matthews as Denise/"Wigwam", Sarah's naive new-age friend and neighbour
- Ken Nwosu as Rufus, Denise's boyfriend
- Aaron Neil as Detective Investigator Ash Varma, a police detective trusted by Zoë Boehm
- Pip Torrens as Dr Isaac Wright, a doctor working with C on a black operation
- Tom Riley as Mark, Sarah's husband, a banker
- Aiysha Hart as Paula, Gerard Inchon's wife
- Sara Kestelman as Janice Silverman, Joe Silverman's mother
- Steven Cree as Bob Poland, Zoë Boehm's younger lover
- Ella Bruccoleri as Steph Ricci, a nurse who is part of Malik's black operation
- Joshua James as Wayne, a morgue worker and hacker who assists Zoë Boehm
- Sophia Brown as Ella Downey, Michael Downey's sister
- Gary Lewis as Captain Donny, a Scottish fisherman

=== Supporting ===
- Ivy Quoi as Dinah Singleton, a young girl whose apparent disappearance is investigated by Sarah
- Mark Benton as Tony McGrath, a university professor and friend of Joe
- Ioanna Kimbook as Cheski Galanis, Talia Ross's political aid
- Jonny Lavelle as Ty, a member of Malik's team
- Hugo Chegwin as Nev, a member of Malik's team
- David Moorst as Sam, a hotel receptionist
- Harry Anton as Eli, C's chauffeur
- Aisha Toussaint as DCI Shona, a Scottish detective

== Episodes ==
No.	Title	Directed by	Written by	Original release date
1	"Almost True"	Natalie Bailey	Morwenna Banks	29 October 2025
In Oxford, Ashmolean Museum conservator Sarah Trafford and her banker husband Mark invite his obnoxious client Gerard Inchon, his wife Paula, and Sarah's bohemian friend Wigwam and her partner Rufus to dinner. The neighbourhood is rocked by an explosion, killing Wigwam's friend Maddie Singleton; Sarah notices a mysterious man watching as Maddie's five-year-old daughter Dinah is put in an ambulance. Authorities blame a gas explosion, but Sarah is suspicious after being prevented from visiting Dinah in hospital. She realises Dinah has been erased from press photos of the incident, while the police file has been flagged as confidential. Unbeknown to Sarah, the explosion was part of a covert Ministry of Defence operation; high-ranking MoD official 'C' berates his underling Hamza Malik for the unauthorised bombing, carried out by a troublesome operative. Realising she is being tailed by the watcher, Sarah visits married private detectives Zoë Boehm and Joe Silvermann. Joe agrees to investigate, and discovers Dinah is being transferred. Sarah races to the hospital, pulling the fire alarm before the watcher can reach Dinah. She returns to Joe's office to find him dead by apparent suicide.
2	"A Kind of Grief"	Natalie Bailey	Rose Heiney & Morwenna Banks	29 October 2025
Though she and her husband had grown apart, Zoë refuses to believe Joe killed himself. At Joe's office Sarah is confronted by Amos Crane, another of Hamza's operatives, who warns her to abandon her search for Dinah. Conducting her own investigation, Zoë meets with Sarah's former professor, Tony, who remembers her surviving a hallucinogenic-induced leap from the college roof. C orders Hamza to Oxford, where Amos is keeping Dinah as bait for their unknown target, and Hamza tasks him to eliminate Sarah. Finding her on the college rooftop, Zoë enlists Sarah's help, believing the explosion was deliberate and tied to Joe's death. Sarah spots the watcher in Mark's video from the night of the blast, and notices a flirtatious message from Mark's assistant. Discovering blood on a scarf, Sarah realises it came from Joe's doorknob when she found his body, suggesting murder. She informs the police, while Joe's mother Janice urges Zoë to allow herself to mourn. Comforting Sarah at home, Rufus reveals himself as Hamza's wayward operative Axel—Amos's brother, the bomber, and Joe's killer. As Axel strangles Sarah, the watcher bursts in and opens fire.
3	"Filthy Work"	Sam Donovan	Emily Marcuson	5 November 2025
Downey, the watcher, kills Axel and drives away with Sarah at gunpoint, revealing he is trying to protect Dinah. Amos scrubs Sarah's house of evidence and disposes of his brother's body, before Hamza attempts to dismiss him on C's orders, but Amos is determined to hunt Downey down. Zoë meets Wigwam and realises Sarah is in danger from "Rufus", identifying him as Joe's killer from a neighbour's security footage. Zoë questions Mark after recording evidence of his affair with his assistant, while Sarah steals a stranger's phone at a petrol station to call Mark for help, only to silently discover his affair herself. C uses the explosion to conceal the death of Maddie's husband Tommy, whose deteriorating health was connected to a mysterious regimen of pills shared by Downey. Mortuary attendant Wayne helps confirm Zoë's suspicions, which she lays out for her lover, Metropolitan Police officer Bob Poland: Tommy was the bombing's target, after fellow soldiers from his battalion in Afghanistan were believed dead after being court-martialed. Amos hides a tracking device in a teddy bear for Dinah, while Zoë leaves an envelope with Janice for safekeeping. Laying low at a hotel with Downey, Sarah calls Zoë.
4	"My Friends Don't Like Me"	Sam Donovan	Kevin Cecil & Andy Riley	12 November 2025
Sarah identifies Downey in a photo of Tommy's regiment sent by Zoë, but a paranoid Downey smashes her phone. He collapses, and Sarah forces him to explain that his pills are an experimental treatment for a neurological condition. Researching the medication online, Sarah unwittingly alerts Amos to her location. He arrives in the guise of a delivery driver, but she and Downey escape the hotel and go to Gerard and Paula for help. Downey admits to Sarah that he is the government's target, and the two of them set off to find Dinah, taking Gerard's guns and Paula's car. Relocating Dinah, Hamza hires a trio of hitmen to eliminate Amos. They ambush him at home, but Amos kills them instead. Zoë informs DI Ash Varma of her findings, and inadvertently convinces Wayne, who is on probation for computer hacking, to quit the mortuary. Tracing Tommy's autopsy to Dr Isaac Wright, a neurologist involved with C's covert operation, Zoë steals Wright's laptop. Wright notifies C and sends him a photo of Zoë, who returns home to find a threatening spray-painted message: "STOP".
5	"Slow Dying"	Sam Donovan	Emily Marcuson	19 November 2025
Determined to find Dinah, Sarah and Downey use Axel's phone to call Amos. While new Defence Secretary Talia Ross demands transparency from the intelligence services, C is ambushed by Amos, who offers to lure Downey to Scotland, where Dinah is being kept at the abandoned facility that housed Downey, Tommy, and their fellow soldiers. Zoë enlists Wayne to hack Wright's laptop and confronts Wright, who admits that the soldiers were unwitting test subjects for the pills, an unsuccessful antidote to a mysterious chemical weapon. Wayne decrypts a video of the chemical attack in Afghanistan on the regiment by their own government. Downey brings Sarah to his sister Ella, who believed he and his unit were dead after they were blamed for killing civilians. He reveals to Sarah that he and Tommy were the sole survivors to escape the facility, and the bombing was meant to kill them both; having been in love with Maddie, he believes Dinah may be his daughter. Hamza fails to ensure Zoë's silence as she tails Wright, who is killed by Amos on C's orders, and she follows Amos aboard a train to Scotland.
6	"Neglected Waters"	Börkur Sigþórsson	Rose Heiney	26 November 2025
On the train, Amos recognises Zoë from Axel's notes and prepares to kill her. She befriends American tourists Bob and Shelley to keep Amos at bay, evading him throughout the compartments, but he sets a fire and the train is evacuated. Commandeering Bob and Shelley's taxi, Amos shoots them and calls the police, framing Zoë as their killer. He continues to follow Dinah's tracker, while Wayne directs Zoë to a nearby army base visited by Wright. Abandoned by Downey, an overwhelmed Sarah reaches the derelict base and discovers Zoë, who shows her the video of the chemical attack and persuades her to press on. Visiting a pub, Sarah overhears that police are searching for Zoë, and they realise Dinah is being held on a neighbouring island. Hoping either Amos or Downey will eliminate the other, C sends Hamza to Scotland with a gun to ensure neither survives. Sarah and Zoë hijack a sightseeing boat, locking the captain in the cabin, as they, Downey, and Amos each make their way to the island.
7	"Lights Go Out"	Börkur Sigþórsson	Morwenna Banks	3 December 2025
Storming the MoD facility, Downey shoots Hamza's men and rescues Dinah. They flee from Amos with Dinah's nurse Steph, leaving the tracker behind. Janice informs DI Varma that Zoë is missing, and his inquiries into Wright's MoD ties and suspicious death reach Ross, who warns C not to abuse her trust. Sarah and Zoë enlist the Scottish captain's help by assuring him their mission will embarrass the English government. The two of them reach the island, now empty after being taken over by MoD operations, and find the others as Sarah finally meets Dinah. Amos opens fire, killing Steph, but Downey draws him away and is shot in the leg. Finishing Downey off, Amos adds one of his dreadlocks to Axel's notebook. Sarah and Dinah are forced to jump off a cliff to reach Amos's dinghy, while Zoë distracts Amos to shoot at her instead. The gunfire detonates old landmines planted on the beach, and an explosion sends Zoë flying, as Sarah and Dinah sail toward the waiting captain.
8	"What Will Survive"	Börkur Sigþórsson	Morwenna Banks	10 December 2025
Sarah and Dinah leave the island using Amos's boat, Amos finds Downey's boat and leaves and Zoe travels back to harbour on the Scottish captain's boat. Zoe, Sarah and Dinah leave the village on a bus to avoid the police hunt for Zoe but realise that Hamza has hijacked the bus. He crashes it into a church and takes Zoe, Dinah and Sarah hostages while he calls C for instructions. C says backup is on the way and calls Amos to eliminate everyone in the church. Amos throws in a grenade which destroys a lot of the church but Sarah and Dinah escape leaving Zoe and Amos to fight until Amos is killed. Hamza confronts Sarah and fires her shotgun which explodes in his hand leaving Zoe, Sarah and Dinah to leave Scotland on a sleeper train. On the train Wayne is told to publish on social media and the defence secretary is grilled on a TV interview about the testing on soldiers. Dinah is reunited with her cousins and C resigns and moves into the private sector.

== Production ==
The project, from the London-based 60Forty Films, was announced in April 2024 with Natalie Bailey as lead director and Morwenna Banks adapting the Mick Herron novel, and executive producer. Other executive producers include Jamie Laurenson, Hakan Kousetta and Tom Nash of 60Forty Films, as well as Herron, and Emma Thompson. On 12 December 2025, Apple TV renewed the series for a second season.

Emma Thompson stars as investigator Zoë Boehm alongside Ruth Wilson as Sarah Trafford (née Tucker). In August 2024, Adeel Akhtar, Nathan Stewart-Jarrett, Tom Goodman-Hill, Darren Boyd, Tom Riley, Adam Godley, Sinead Matthews, Ken Nwosu, Fehinti Balogun, and Aiysha Hart joined the cast. The cast also includes Ella Bruccoleri.

Although the series is primarily set in and around Oxford, and many of the outside scenes were filmed in that city, principal photography began in Bristol in June 2024 with locations including the University of Bristol campus. Filming also took place in Bishops Lydeard railway station and Street, Somerset.

Renewed for a second series in December 2025, filming took place in Oxford in August 2026. Cast members added for the second series included Martin Clunes, Paul Chahidi, Paterson Joseph, Fionn Whitehead and Amanda Abbington.

== Release ==
The series debuted on Apple TV on 29 October 2025, with the first two episodes and the rest debuting on a weekly basis until the finale on 10 December.

== Reception ==
On the review aggregator website Rotten Tomatoes, the series holds an approval rating of 81% based on 58 critic reviews. The website's critics consensus reads, "A twisty mystery that grows more addictive as it unfolds, Down Cemetery Road is tonally imbalanced but has a steadfast center of gravity in Emma Thompson's flinty star turn." Metacritic gave the series a weighted average score of 71 out of 100 based on 23 critics, indicating "generally favorable" reviews.
