= Sally Green =

English author (born 1961)

- Born: 1961 (age 64–65); Lytham St Annes, Lancashire, England.
- Education: Imperial College London
- Occupation: Author
- Children: One son
- Writing career
- Language: English
- Genre: Young adult fantasy
- Notable works: Half Bad trilogy The Smoke Thieves trilogy
- Notable awards: 2015 Waterstones Children's Book Prize
- Website: sallygreenwriter.com

Sally Green (born 1961) is a British fantasy author. Her work includes the Half Bad trilogy, related short stories, and The Smoke Thieves trilogy. The Half Bad trilogy was adapted into the Netflix series The Bastard Son & The Devil Himself.

== Early life and career ==
Green was born in 1961 and grew up in Lytham St Annes, Lancashire, England. She studied mining geology and graduated from Imperial College London in 1983. After she completed her degree, she worked for an industry publishing firm, and then trained to become an accountant. She worked as an accountant until 2001.

After becoming a mother, she stopped working as an accountant for four years. She told The Daily Telegraph, "I loved being at home with the baby. We had a huge garden so I kept chickens, grew vegetables and became a complete earth mother."

== Writing career ==
She began developing the Half Bad story after going to a storytelling weekend at the Festival at the Edge in Shropshire. After her son began school, she took online English literature and creative writing courses at the Open University.

Green began writing a novel in 2010, and completed a manuscript that was rejected by every agent she contacted. She rewrote the novel, and told Publishers Weekly, "That first attempt was quite different from Half Bad, but it got me thinking about writing another story in that world."

She sent the revised manuscript to the one agent who had previously sent her encouragement, Claire Wilson, and they were soon handling offers that ultimately resulted in a 1 million pound advance for Half Bad. In 2013, bidding wars for the rights of her work included the rights for a film won by Fox 2000 and Karen Rosenfelt, the producer of The Twilight Saga.

In 2014, Half Bad was published, the first book in a trilogy where according to the Sunday Mail, "there are white witches and black witches. And in this modern-day Britain, humans and witches co-exist." Green won the 2015 'Best Book for Teens' in the Waterstones Children's Book Prize for Half Bad, and her second book continued the Half Bad story with Half Wild in 2015.

In 2014, Green also published the short story "Half Lies", and in 2015, the short story "Half Truths", both related to the Half Bad trilogy as prequels. The final book of the trilogy, Half Lost, was published in 2016. Green has cited Wuthering Heights by Emily Brontë as the main inspiration for her Half Bad trilogy.

In 2018, Green published The Smoke Thieves, the first book in The Smoke Thieves trilogy, followed by the sequel The Demon World in 2019, and the conclusion The Burning Kingdoms in 2020. In 2022, Netflix released one season of The Bastard Son & The Devil Himself series, a show based on the Half Bad books.

== Personal life ==
Green is married and has a son. She lives in Warrington, Cheshire, England.

== Works ==
=== Half Bad trilogy ===
- Half Bad (2014)
- Half Wild (2015)
- Half Lost (2016)

Green also wrote two short stories that are prequels to the Half Bad trilogy.

- Half Lies (2014)
- Half Truths (2015)

=== The Smoke Thieves trilogy ===
- The Smoke Thieves (2018)
- The Demon World (2019)
- The Burning Kingdoms (2020)

== Honours and awards ==
- 2015 'Best Book for Teens' in the Waterstones Children's Book Prize
- Green is in the Guinness world book of Records for
  - "Most translated children’s book by a debut author, pre-publication"
  - "Most translated book by a debut author, pre-publication"
