= Giri/Haji =

2019 British television series

Japanese name
- Kanji: 義理/恥
- Literal meaning: Duty/Shame
Transcriptions
- Revised Hepburn: Giri/Haji
- Genre: Crime thriller; Drama
- Created by: Joe Barton
- Written by: Joe Barton
- Directed by: Julian Farino; Ben Chessell
- Starring: Takehiro Hira; Kelly Macdonald; Yōsuke Kubozuka; Will Sharpe; Aoi Okuyama; Katsuya; Masahiro Motoki; Justin Long; Sophia Brown; Anna Sawai; Charlie Creed-Miles; Yoshiki Minato
- Composer: Adrian Johnston
- Country of origin: United Kingdom
- Original languages: English; Japanese
- No. of series: 1
- No. of episodes: 8

Production
- Executive producers: Jane Featherstone; Chris Fry; Joe Barton; Julian Farino
- Producer: Susie Liggat
- Production locations: United Kingdom; Japan
- Cinematography: David Odd; Piers McGrail
- Editors: Elen Pierce Lewis; Matthew Tabern; Dominic Strevens
- Camera setup: Single-camera
- Running time: 56–60 minutes
- Production company: Sister Pictures

Original release
- Network: BBC Two
- Release: 17 October – 5 December 2019

Giri/Haji (Japanese: 義理/恥, 'Duty/Shame') is a British eight-part crime drama television series that premiered on BBC Two in the United Kingdom on 17 October 2019, and was released internationally on Netflix on 10 January 2020. A co-production between the BBC and Netflix, the series was created and written by Joe Barton, and features an international ensemble cast including Takehiro Hira, Kelly Macdonald, Yōsuke Kubozuka, Will Sharpe, Masahiro Motoki, Justin Long, Anna Sawai, and Charlie Creed-Miles.The series is set in London and Tokyo, with dialogue in English and Japanese.

It was broadcast from 17 October–5 December 2019 and received positive reviews from critics. In September 2020, it was cancelled by BBC Two and Netflix.

== Synopsis ==
Kenzo Mori (Takehiro Hira), a Tokyo detective, travels to London in search of his brother, Yuto (Yōsuke Kubozuka), who was previously assumed to be dead. Yuto has been accused of murdering the nephew of a Yakuza member, which threatens to start a gang war in Tokyo. As Kenzo attempts to navigate the unfamiliar territory of London to learn whether his brother is alive and guilty, he becomes acquainted with DC Sarah Weitzmann (Kelly Macdonald) of the Metropolitan Police and Rodney Yamaguchi (Will Sharpe), a young half-Japanese, half-British sex worker.

While searching for Yuto in London, Kenzo must also support his family back home in Tokyo. Kenzo's investigation brings him into contact with dangerous elements of London's criminal underworld.

== Cast and characters ==
- Takehiro Hira as Kenzo Mori (Japanese: 森健三, Mori Kenzō), a Tokyo police detective who travels to London to search for his missing brother
- Kelly Macdonald as Sarah Weitzmann, a detective constable alienated within the Metropolitan Police for having exposed internal corruption
- Yōsuke Kubozuka as Yuto Mori (Japanese: 森勇人, Mori Yūto), Kenzo's younger brother and a member of the Yakuza
- Will Sharpe as Rodney Yamaguchi, a charismatic half-Japanese, half-British rent boy and drug addict living in London
- Aoi Okuyama as Taki Mori (Japanese: 森多喜, Mori Taki), Kenzo's rebellious 16-year-old daughter
- Masahiro Motoki as Fukuhara (Japanese: 福原, Fukuhara), a Yakuza boss
- Charlie Creed-Miles as Connor Abbot, a gangster based in London who is fascinated by Japanese culture.
- Justin Long as Ellis Vickers, an American who has a business partnership with Abbot
- Sophia Brown as Donna Clark, an assassin working for Abbot
- Yūko Nakamura as Rei (Japanese: レイ, Rei), Kenzō's wife
- Mitsuko Oka as Natsuko (Japanese: なつこ, Natsuko), mother of Kenzō and Yūto
- Katsuya as Toshio (Japanese: としお, Toshio), Kenzō's partner in the Tokyo Police Department
- Kazuyuki Tsumura as Chief Inspector Hayashi (Japanese: 林, Hayashi), Kenzo and Toshio's boss
- Katsuya Kobayashi as Shin Endo (Japanese: 遠藤慎, Endō Shin), a Yakuza boss and Fukuhara's rival
- Tony Pitts as Steve Angling, a detective inspector and Sarah's boss
- Anna Sawai as Eiko (Japanese: 栄子, Eiko), Fukuhara's daughter, who has a romantic relationship with Yuto
- Tony Way as Roy, a detective from the Metropolitan Police who is in Tokyo on an exchange programme
- Togo Igawa as Hotaka Mori (Japanese: 森穂高, Mori Hotaka), father of Kenzō and Yūto
- Yoshiki Minato as Jiro (Japanese: 次郎, Jirō), one of Fukuhara's top enforcers
- Jamie Draven as Ian Summers, Sarah's ex-boyfriend and a former Detective Constable in the Metropolitan Police
- John McCrea as Tiff, Rodney's ex-boyfriend
- Ellie James as Annie, Rodney's friend and Taki's love interest

== Production ==
=== Development ===
Giri/Haji was announced in May 2017 as one of several new commissions by the BBC's Controller of Drama, Piers Wenger, alongside Informer, The War of the Worlds, Black Narcissus, A Suitable Boy, Little Women, A Very English Scandal, Come Home and Mrs Wilson for BBC One. In August 2018, it was confirmed that Giri/Haji would air on BBC Two. Wenger described the series as "unlike anything we've ever seen before on British TV".

=== Filming ===
Principal photography began in London around August 2018, and continued in Hastings in March 2019. Filming also took place in Tokyo.

Series lead Takehiro Hira commented on the challenging nature of shooting the bilingual script: "We did have some hard times with the translation... Little nuances on the text didn’t match, or didn’t translate well. So we went back and forth with Joe and the director. It was a challenge, but one we enjoyed."

== Episodes ==
No.	Title	Directed by	Written by	Original release date
1	Episode 1	Julian Farino	Joe Barton	17 October 2019
Tokyo police detective Kenzo Mori and his partner Toshio investigate a gang war between Yakuza bosses Fukuhara and Shin Endo. That night, Kenzo is visited at his home by Fukuhara, who says that Endo's nephew Saburo was killed in London with Fukuhara's ancestral sword. Fukuhara believes the killer to be Kenzo's brother Yuto, who was working for Fukuhara before he disappeared. He sends Kenzo to London to find his brother and thereby clear Fukuhara's name to avoid a gang war. The Tokyo police set up a cover for Kenzo as an exchange student at a police academy course taught by DC Sarah Weitzmann. Looking for leads, Kenzo enlists sex worker Rodney Yamaguchi to grant him entry to the Momo Lounge, a mafia-owned bar. The patrons mention the story of a disgraced Yakuza assassin (Yuto) who saved a London gangster from being killed at the Lounge. Kenzo's investigation is being stalled on behalf of a "Mr. Abbot". In flashbacks, Yuto begs Kenzo's help after shooting one of Endo's men during an altercation over sports betting. Kenzo finds the man injured but alive; he kills him and stages the crime scene to clear Yuto of suspicion.
2	Episode 2	Julian Farino	Joe Barton	24 October 2019
A flashback shows how Yuto began working for Connor Abbot, a small-time London gangster, after saving his life at the Momo Lounge. Abbot, hoping to gain status within the Yakuza, had Yuto kill Saburo. In the present, Abbot's assassin Donna Clark warns Kenzo to drop his investigation. Sarah shows an unidentified mugshot of Yuto to Kenzo, who feigns ignorance. Kenzo breaks into Saburo's safe and finds photos of Fukuhara in an affair with the wife of Tokyo Chief Inspector Hayashi. When he shows the photos to Hayashi, the chief arrests all of Fukuhara's lieutenants, leaving Fukuhara without protection and threatening the fragile peace between the Yakuza gangs. Kenzo finds Rodney badly beaten by his pimp and lets him stay at his apartment; Sarah later meets Rodney and warns his pimp not to hurt him again. Kenzo meets Abbot's former business partner Ellis Vickers and asks his help in finding Yuto. Later he admits to Sarah that he is in London to find his brother. Abbot pressures Donna to kill Kenzo, but she warns against killing a policeman. Instead she takes Yuto to meet Kenzo face-to-face.
3	Episode 3	Julian Farino	Joe Barton	31 October 2019
Yuto warns Kenzo to stay away for his own safety, before having Donna drop him back home. Kenzo's troubled daughter Taki runs away from home in Tokyo and flies to London to stay with him. She soon befriends Rodney and accompanies him to meet the parents of his ex-boyfriend, who killed himself after Rodney broke up with him. Sarah invites Kenzo, Rodney and Taki to her home for a Yom Kippur ritual over dinner, where they share their regrets and receive forgiveness. Kenzo and Vickers go to meet Abbot, but the meeting turns sour when Vickers demands the money he had invested in Abbot's operations. He threatens to send the Albanian mafia after the gangster. Growing impatient, Abbot threatens to kill Donna unless she gets rid of Kenzo; Donna, seeking freedom from Abbot, tips off Vickers that Abbot will be attending a meeting at a Soho restaurant that night with little protection, giving Vickers and the Albanians the opportunity to assassinate him. Vickers invites Kenzo to come along, but Kenzo calls Yuto to warn him, leading Yuto in turn to warn Donna, unaware of her betrayal. All parties converge at the restaurant, and a shootout ensues.
4	Episode 4	Julian Farino	Joe Barton	7 November 2019
Separate flashbacks reveal Yuto and Sarah's backgrounds. Sarah discovers her boyfriend Ian, a fellow policeman, is cheating on her, and retaliates by reporting him for planting evidence to obtain an arrest. Ian is convicted and imprisoned, and Sarah becomes a pariah at the police department. Yuto is shown to have been recruited by Fukuhara as a reward for supposedly killing Endo's men in the sports-betting incident. As he climbs the ranks of the Yakuza, Yuto falls in love with Fukuhara's daughter Eiko and she with him. After she becomes pregnant, Yuto asks Fukuhara's permission to marry Eiko. Fukuhara never wanted his daughter to marry a gangster and orders Yuto killed. Yuto escapes his execution, taking Fukuhara's sword with him, and fakes his death by sending his getaway car into the sea. In the present, Toshio defends an unprotected Fukuhara from assassins sent after him. In London, both Abbot's men and the Albanians suffer heavy casualties during the restaurant shootout. One of the Albanians is about to kill an injured Yuto, but Kenzo kills the man first.
5	Episode 5	Ben Chessell	Joe Barton	14 November 2019
Taki and Rodney find the injured Yuto and take him to Sarah's apartment, where Kenzo arrives and removes the shrapnel from his chest. Vickers takes an injured Donna back to his apartment, where Donna kills him, only to be shot dead by Vickers' wife who arrives home to find her husband dead. Kenzo and Sarah grow closer, while Kenzo's wife Rei calls him from Tokyo to tell him his father Hotaka has died. When Yuto wakes, Kenzo berates him for the situation he has caused and says he plans to arrest him, but Yuto says that the Tokyo police will turn him over to the Yakuza as a peace offering, who will execute him. Yuto reveals that Shin Endo allowed him to kill Saburo and pin the murder on Fukuhara. Yuto intended this as revenge for Fukuhara keeping him from marrying Eiko and raising their son. Sarah's superior, DCI Steve Angling, sends Hayashi a photo of Kenzo chasing down Yuto during the Soho shootout. Yuto calls Rei and asks her help in rescuing his son.
6	Episode 6	Ben Chessell	Joe Barton	21 November 2019
Kenzo, Yuto, Taki, Rodney and Sarah drive to a beach and perform a memorial for Hotaka. Kenzo decides not to arrest Yuto, feeling it is not his place to decide his brother's fate. Kenzo and Sarah admit their feelings for one another, while Taki begins a relationship with Rodney's friend Annie. Rodney, struggling with guilt over his ex-boyfriend's suicide, goes on a nightlong cocaine bender. Later he asks Sarah to help him break his addiction, and starts by joining a support group. Posing as cleaners, Rei and her mother-in-law Natsuko break Eiko and baby Sora out of the safehouse where they are being kept. Natsuko takes them to her family's house in the countryside. Endo cuts ties with Abbot. Despite having lost control of the streets, a recovering Fukuhara resolves to capture Yuto out of honor, and sends his men into London to find him. Ian shows Sarah photos of Yuto in her apartment and tells her he plans to report her for harboring a wanted criminal.
7	Episode 7	Ben Chessell	Joe Barton	28 November 2019
Kenzo and Yuto go searching for Ian. Toshio calls Kenzo to inform him that he is in London with Fukuhara's men. Sarah meets with Ian; Rodney sends Taki to spy on their meeting. She becomes upset and leaves when she hears them discuss whether Sarah loves Kenzo. She is not present when Ian reconciles with Sarah and decides not to report her. Rodney plants drugs on Ian and calls the police on him; Ian is struck by a passing car while resisting arrest and dies from his injuries. Yuto calls Eiko, who tells him to come home. Yuto is recognized on the street by Angling, whom he kidnaps. He contacts Kenzo, who meets with him. The two brothers argue about their lives until Yuto decides he will return to Japan, while Kenzo lets Angling live. On the road, Natsuko tells Rei that she always believed she and Kenzo to be mismatched. Rei calls Kenzo that she no longer wants to be married to him. Kenzo visits Sarah, and the two have sex. Fukuhara's men kill one of Annie's friends at her workplace and force her to lure Taki there.
8	Episode 8	Julian Farino	Joe Barton	5 December 2019
Eiko's guards track her group down to Natsuko's family farmhouse. Roy, a British exchange officer in Tokyo as Abbot's informant, has followed them and kills the guards. Roy promises to drive the group to safety, but a suspicious Eiko calls the police. A struggle with Roy causes the car to crash. No one is harmed, and the police rescue Eiko's group. In London, Fukuhara's men kidnap Taki to force Yuto into a meeting. Yuto gives the meeting's location to Kenzo, whom Abbot forces to take him along. Sarah follows them, and the three confront Fukuhara's men on a rooftop. Yuto arrives and an armed standoff ensues, but Taki threatens to jump off the parapet to her death, saying she was abandoned by her father and wants to end the violence. She nearly slips and falls, but Kenzo and Yuto save her. Meanwhile, Endo calls a Yakuza meeting to formally settle his conflict with Fukuhara, only to kill Fukuhara himself. The Yakuza's adjudicators kill Endo's men and take the leader away (for likely execution), declaring the gang war over. Hayashi relays the news to Fukuhara's men in London; when they refuse to stand down, Yuto and Abbot kill them. Yuto goes on the run once again, while Kenzo asks Sarah to turn him in to the British police, expressing his wish for Yuto to find peace. Yuto reunites with Eiko and Sora in Paris.

== Reception ==
On the review aggregator Rotten Tomatoes, the first series holds an approval rating of 100% based on 24 reviews, with an average rating of 9.20/10. The consensus on the website reads, "Smart, suspenseful, and superbly shot, Giri/Haji is a near-perfect crime thriller with a surprisingly sharp sense of humor." Metacritic, which uses a weighted average, assigned the film a score of 76 out of 100, based on four critics, indicating "generally favorable" reviews.

Writing for the Radio Times, Patrick Cremona described Giri/Haji as a "breath of fresh air" and a "masterful and sprawling thriller", awarding the series five stars out of five. The Times critic Carol Migley awarded the opening episode four stars out of five. The Daily Telegraph reviewer Michael Hogan gave it five stars out of five, describing it as "impressionistic, playful and unashamedly arty", as well as "bold, bewitching and slightly bonkers". The New Yorker included the series in an article about the best programmes available on streaming services, with reviewer Doreen St. Félix writing: "violently stylish, and also plain violent, Giri/Haji is a filial drama crossed with a sprawling, sexy police thriller".

The Guardian's Lucy Mangan was more critical, awarding the series three out of five stars based on a partial viewing. Mangan complimented the "unfetishised" portrayal of Japan, but described the series as "a bore" and criticised the more familiar genre tropes. David Cirone of J-Generation criticized the series as going "heavy on theme, light on story", and NPR's Fresh Air critic John Powers noted that the show's "excesses can get a bit silly".
