= Half Bad =

2014 young adult novel by Sally Green

- Front cover of the first edition of Half Bad
- Author: Sally Green
- Language: English
- Series: The Half Bad trilogy
- Genre: Young adult (fantasy)
- Publisher: Puffin Books (UK); Viking Press (US)
- Publication date: 4 March 2014 (US); 3 March 2014 (UK)
- Publication place: United Kingdom
- Media type: Print (hardback & paperback)
- Pages: 400pp (hardback, first edition)
- ISBN: 9780670016785
- Followed by: Half Wild

Half Bad is a 2014 young adult fantasy novel written by English author Sally Green. It won the 2015 Waterstones Teen Book Prize and was shortlisted for the 2015 Branford Boase Award.

On 3 March 2014, the book set the Guinness World Record as the 'Most Translated Book by a Debut Author, Pre-publication', having sold in 45 languages prior to its UK publication by Penguin books.

== Plot ==
Half Bad is set in a version of modern-day Europe, mainly Britain, in which witches and humans (Fains) live together. Witches are divided into Black (oppressed and written off as evil), and White, the latter making up the majority of the witch population.

The 17-year-old protagonist, Nathan, is half White and half Black, or Half Code. His mother is dead, and his father, Marcus, is the most powerful and violent Black witch in history. Because of his parentage, Nathan's every move is monitored by the Council of White Witches. He is forced to follow a strict set of rules, but when he breaks one too many, he is taken away from his grandmother and entrusted into the care of a White witch, Celia. Trapped in a cage and abused by Celia, Nathan must escape before his seventeenth birthday, to find his father, and receive three gifts from him and his Gift. Otherwise, he will die.

=== Story terms ===
- Hunters: An army of White witches who capture and kill Black witches
- Whet: A young witch who has not yet received their Gift.

=== Characters ===
- Nathan Byrn: The 17-year-old protagonist. He has straight black hair, olive skin and black eyes. He looks like his father. Raised in a family of White witches, but with a Black witch father, he is a Half Code. He can self-heal extraordinarily fast.
- Jessica Byrn: Nathan's oldest half-sister who hates him. She later becomes a Hunter.
- Arran Byrn: Nathan's half-brother, with whom Nathan has a loving relationship.
- Deborah Byrn: Nathan's half-sister. She (like Arran) loves Nathan.
- Marcus Edge: Nathan's father, the most feared Black witch of all time. He killed Nathan's siblings' father, among numerous others. His Gift is transforming into animals but he has also stolen Gifts from many other witches by killing them and eating their hearts.
- Cora Byrn: Nathan's mother, a White witch who died by suicide. Her gift was healing.
- Gabriel Boutin: A Black witch stuck in the body of a Fain. He helps Mercury to get Nathan to her in order to get his witch body back and later falls in love with Nathan.
- Annalise O'Brien: A White witch, some months older than Nathan. She runs away from her cruel family. She and Nathan were in love as young teens.
- Soul O'Brien: The uncle of Annalise and a White witch.
- Mercury: A powerful Black witch who has stolen the blood of every witch family.
- Rose: A White witch and Mercury's assistant, who always blushes and giggles.
- Celia: A White witch, Nathan's mentor with whom he was sent to live. She appears to treat Nathan cruelly and even would lock him in a cage. However, near the end of her time with Nathan, it is shown that she does care about him and her cruel actions were to prepare him mentally and physically for the hard world ahead.

== Development ==
Sally Green submitted Half Bad to an agent in January 2013; in March, editorial director Ben Horslen acquired the manuscript for Penguin Books children's imprint Puffin Books, billing it "the book of the Bologna Children's Book Fair" after a six-figure bidding war. In the run up to its publication in the UK on March 3, 2014, international rights to Half Bad sold rapidly; within 13 weeks of acquisition, it had sold in 25 territories; by November 2013, 36. On publication day, it broke the Guinness World Record for 'Most Translated Book by a Debut Author, Pre-publication' with 45 different translations.

== Reception ==
Even prior to its publication people drew comparisons to The Hunger Games, Harry Potter or the Twilight series. Half Bad has also been compared to Nineteen Eighty-Four by George Orwell. It had already broken two Guinness World Records as the most translated book – and the most translated children's book – by a debut author before publication.

A Publishers Weekly starred review states, "This grim and thrilling tale, first in a planned trilogy, features understated prose that lets readers' imaginations fill in the blanks, as well as a well-developed sense of Witch culture. Nathan, the damaged survivor of horrific abuse, is an unforgettable protagonist, and Green expertly captures his torment at being caught between the mutually hostile sides of his heritage." Kirkus Reviews states, "Green propels Nathan forward with the help of often underdeveloped secondary characters, who are overshadowed by the imaginary relationship Nathan builds with his father; it is this that keeps both Nathan and readers going." In a review for Tor.com, Kat Kennedy writes, "Sally Green's Half Bad is the perfect novel for inspiring one to despise all of humanity or fall onto the ground and weep pathetically. Needless to say, it is an excellent book."

In a review for The Guardian, Philip Womack writes, "While there is nothing new here, Half Bad's combination of themes will no doubt be entirely attractive to a large section of readers. Whether it will retain a hold on their imaginations is another matter." In a review for The Telegraph, Martin Chilton writes, "Half Bad doesn't always feel particularly original (scenes are set in mysterious alleys) but it is full of suspense."

Half Bad won the 2015 Waterstones Teen Book Prize. It was also shortlisted for the 2015 Branford Boase Award, which seeks to acknowledge outstanding debut novels for children and teenagers; it is an award presented both to the author and editor.

== Sequel ==
Half Wild was released on 24 March 2015. The third and final book in the series, Half Lost, was released in March 2016.

In November 2014 a companion story, "Half Lies", was released.

== Adaptations ==
A feature film adaptation was announced by Fox 2000 in 2013 with Karen Rosenfelt attached, but went unproduced.

Netflix announced a TV adaptation in 2020, to be helmed by Joe Barton, which was released on 28 October 2022 as The Bastard Son & The Devil Himself.
