= Joe Barton (screenwriter) =

British screenwriter

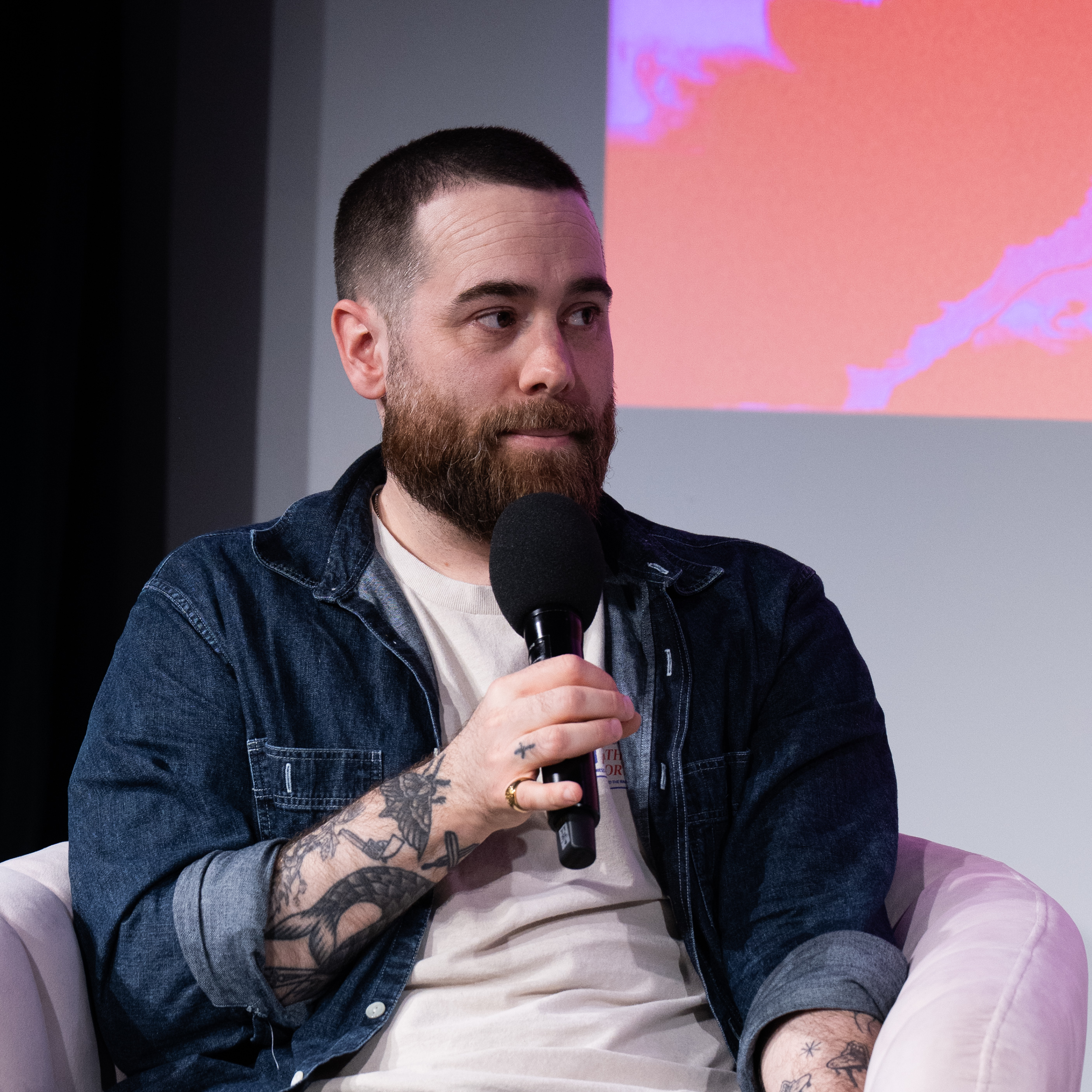
- Barton at SXSW London, June 2025
- Born: 1985 (age 40–41)
- Occupation: Screenwriter
- Known for: Giri/Haji; The Lazarus Project; The Bastard Son & The Devil Himself; Black Doves

Joe Barton (born 1985) is a British screenwriter of film and television, best known for the crime series Giri/Haji, the science-fiction thriller The Lazarus Project, and the spy thriller Black Doves.

== Early life ==
Barton was born in London. He studied Film and Television Production at the University of Westminster. One of his first jobs was as a driver during production of the film Cass (2008).

== Career ==
His writing career began in film. He has written the screenplay for such films as The Ritual, My Days of Mercy and IBoy. In 2020, it was announced he had written Encounter, a sci-fi thriller starring Riz Ahmed and Octavia Spencer. Amazon Studios distributed it. He is tapped to write a sequel to Cloverfield, as well as a new Jason Bourne film.

Barton has also written extensively in television, beginning with Beaver Falls. He later wrote for Humans, Our World War, and the epic miniseries Troy: Fall of a City.

In 2019, BBC Two broadcast Barton's crime thriller Giri/Haji (Japanese: 義理/恥, "Duty/Shame"). The series is set in London and Tokyo, with dialogue in English and Japanese. On 13 December 2020, it was announced Barton would be showrunner on Netflix's Half Bad, based on the trilogy of books by author Sally Green, with Andy Serkis and Jonathan Cavendish as executive producers. The series was later renamed to The Bastard Son & The Devil Himself.

In January 2021, it was announced that Barton would be replacing Terence Winter as showrunner on an untitled Gotham City Police Department spinoff series based on The Batman. This was canceled in March 2022, due to "creative differences". On 20 February 2024, Barton revealed that he had pitched a potential fourth season of True Detective to HBO. However, they turned it down in favour of Night Country.

In November 2022, it was announced that Barton would be adapting the Peter Shaffer play Amadeus as a television series.

In February 2023, it was announced Barton would write and executive produce an untitled bounty hunter drama series, to be directed by Michael Bay. On 26 April 2023, it was announced that Barton would write the Netflix thriller series Black Doves, starring Keira Knightley as a British spy.

== Personal life ==
Barton lives in Brighton with his partner Alice and their two sons.

== Filmography ==
Short film

Year	Title	Director
2010	Nowhere Left to Run	Julian Gibbs

=== Feature film ===
Year	Title	Director
2017	iBoy	Adam Randall
2017	The Ritual	David Bruckner
2017	My Days of Mercy	Tali Shalom Ezer
2021	Encounter	Michael Pearce
2024	The Union	Julian Farino
TBA	Untitled Cloverfield sequel	Babak Anvari
TBA	Untitled Bourne film	Edward Berger
TBA	Hold The Devil	Álex de la Iglesia

=== Television ===
Year	Title	Writer	Executive Producer	Creator	Notes
2009	Freak	Yes	No	No	4 episodes, web series
2012	Beaver Falls	Yes	No	No	Episode #2.5
2014	Our World War	Yes	No	Yes	
2015–2016	Humans	Yes	No	No	3 episodes
2015	Cuffs	Yes	No	No	Episode: "Shakedowns and Stakeouts"
2018	Troy: Fall of a City	Yes	No	No	Episode: "Battle on the Beach"
2019	Giri/Haji	Yes	Yes	Yes	
2022	The Bastard Son & The Devil Himself	Yes	Yes	Yes	
2022–2023	The Lazarus Project	Yes	Yes	Yes	
2024–present	Black Doves	Yes	Yes	Yes	
2025	Amadeus	Yes	Yes	Yes	

TV movies

- Blackout (2013)
- Glasgow Girls (2014)
