= Oscar Kennedy =

English actor (born 1999)

- Born: 6 May 1999 (age 27); Nottingham, England
- Occupation: Actor
- Years active: 2010–present
- Television: Hunted; Home from Home; Ladhood; Wreck

Oscar Kennedy (born 6 May 1999) is an English actor known for his television roles in Hunted (2012), Outlander (2016), Home from Home (2016–2018), Decline and Fall (2017), Bliss (2018), Ladhood (2019–2022), Wreck (2022–present) and Breeders (2023) and in film The Man with the Iron Heart (2017) and School's Out Forever in 2021.

== Early life ==
Kennedy was born on 6 May 1999 in Nottingham. His love of acting grew from attending his school's drama club in primary school and resulted in him auditioning to study at the Television Workshop, which lead to him being cast in his first on-screen role as a young Nigel Slater in Toast. Kennedy is represented by Curtis Brown.

== Career ==
Kennedy starred alongside David Tennant and Emily Watson in the 2013 BBC Two miniseries The Politician's Husband. In the show, he plays Noah, a young man with Asperger syndrome and the son of Tennant and Watson's characters, who is caught in the middle of a family conflict. That same year, he portrayed a young Henry VII in The White Queen.

In 2016, Kennedy portrayed William Grey in an episode of the second season of Starz drama Outlander but was replaced by David Berry in later seasons following a time jump necessitating an older actor. Discussing his time on the show in a 2022 interview with the Daily Express, Kennedy spoke favourably about his appearance and stated that he would be open to returning as the character.

From 2019 to 2022, Kennedy appeared in the BBC iPlayer coming-of-age comedy series Ladhood which was written by and starred Liam Williams and was based on his adolescent experiences. Kennedy played the younger version of Williams' character in all three seasons of the show and received critical accalim for his performance. Kennedy starred alongside Anthony Head, Alex Macqueen and Samantha Bond in the 2021 science fiction film School's Out Forever, which was adapted from the series of novels by Scott K. Andrews and received largely positive critical reception.

In 2022, Kennedy was cast in the lead role of BBC Three's comedy horror series Wreck, which was created by British writer Ryan J. Brown and focuses on Kennedy's character Jamie, who sneaks onto a cruise ship in order to find out more about the disappearance of his sister. When discussing the character, Kennedy contrasted him with his character Liam from Ladhood and stated that "Jamie is a young lad from Sheffield. He's not quite so sure of himself. He's a bit of a social outcast. He's had a troubled home life, and now he's lost the only person that he cares about and cared about him, his sister Pippa. So his new sole motivation in life is to find out what happened to her." The second series of Wreck premiered on 26 March 2024.

== Filmography ==
Film

Year	Title	Role	Notes
2017	The Man with the Iron Heart	Milic Zelenka	
2021	School's Out Forever	Lee Keegan	

Television

Year	Title	Role	Notes
2010	Toast	Young Nigel Slater	TV movie
2011	Sirens	Mini Stuart	1 episode
2011	The Body Farm	Robbie Fay	1 episode
2011	Great Expectations	Young Pip	1 episode
2012	Hunted	Edward Turner	Main role, 8 episodes
2013	The Politician's Husband	Noah Hoynes	Main role, 3 episodes
2013	The White Queen	Henry Tudor	Recurring role, 3 episodes
2014	Silk	Fraser Stephens	1 episode
2016	Outlander	William Grey	1 episode
2016–2018	Home from Home	Garth Hackett	Main role, 7 episodes
2017	Decline and Fall	Peter Beste-Chetwynde	3 episodes
2018	Bliss	Kirstaps	Main role, 7 episodes
2019–2022	Ladhood	Liam Williams	Main role, 18 episodes
2022–present	Wreck	Jamie Walsh	Main role, 12 episodes
2023	Breeders	Luke	Main role, 10 episodes
2025	Missing You	Brendan	
