= Scott Andrews =

Scott Andrews may refer to:

- Scott K. Andrews (born 1971), English author
- Scott Andrews (rugby union, born 1989), Wales international rugby union player, prop forward
- Scott Andrews (rugby union, born 1994), Welsh rugby union player, lock forward
- Scott Andrews (politician) (born 1974), Canadian politician
- Scott Andrews (curler) (born 1989), Scottish curler
- Scott Andrews (racing driver), Australian racing driver
