= Orwell Park School =

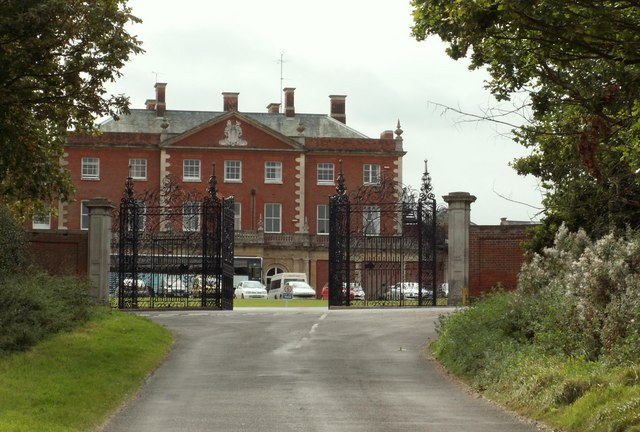
- Front of School

Location
- Nacton, Suffolk, IP10 0ER; England
- Coordinates: 52.0100°N 1.2277°E

Information
- Type: Preparatory day and boarding
- Motto: Nil Desperandum Christo Duce
- Religious affiliation: Christian Inter-denominational
- Established: 1868
- Founders: Reverend Walter Wilkinson
- Department for Education URN: 124866 Tables
- Chairman of Governors: Callum Licence
- Headmaster: Simon O'Malley
- Gender: Coeducational
- Age: 2 to 13
- Houses: Blue Boars, Green Dragons, Red Lions and Yellow Tigers
- Colour: Navy Blue
- Website: https://orwellpark.co.uk/

Orwell Park School is a day and boarding preparatory school for boys and girls in the village of Nacton on the edge of Ipswich in the English county of Suffolk. Founded in 1868 in Lowestoft, the school currently accommodates around 300 boys and girls between the ages of 2½ and 13 years. It is a member of the IAPS.

== Present school ==
The School is split into two sections:

- Pre-Prep School (Nursery – Year 2, ages 2½-7)
- Prep School (Year 3 – Year 8, ages 7–13)

The school is located in a grade II listed building in about 110 acres (450,000 m^{2}) of parkland in the Suffolk village of Nacton, overlooking the River Orwell.

The school's curriculum includes English, maths, sciences, humanities, art, music, TPR, modern foreign languages, classics (including Latin and Greek) as well as computing and life skills.

== History ==
The school was founded by the Reverend Walter Wilkinson in Lowestoft in 1868, then known as Crespigny House. It moved to Aldeburgh in 1870, changing its name to Eaton House and then Aldeburgh Lodge. The school finally moved to its present location of Nacton in 1937, being renamed again as Orwell Park.

During World War II, the school was evacuated, first to Devon, and then Shropshire. As part of preparations for the D-Day landings, Orwell School was used by the 7th Armoured Division (The Desert Rats) as a training location due to its sloped terrain leading down to estuary of the River Orwell.

Whilst originally admitting only boys, girls were first accepted in 1992. Former pupils of the school are known as 'Old Orwellians'.

== History of the buildings ==
According to Pevsner, the main school building dates to c. 1770, built by the family of Admiral Edward Vernon. It was acquired by Colonel George Tomline in 1848, who proceeded to extend and modify the building and grounds. Most notably, this included the addition of an observatory containing a 26 cm refracting telescope, known as the Tomline Refractor, that is still in use today.

Other than the main school building itself, there are other grade II listed buildings nearby, such as the Water Tower, Orangery and Clock Tower. The Pre-Prep classrooms are in a separate, purpose-built building, completed in 2013.

== Sports and other activities ==
The usual range of sports are offered at the school, for both boys and girls, including: rugby, hockey and cricket, with football, golf, sailing, skiing, swimming and tennis also available.

Orwell Park School has links with Mayo College in Ajmer, Rajasthan, India, with staff and pupils from both schools undertaking several exchange visits over the past few years.

The upcoming film School's Out Forever, based on Scott K. Andrews's book School's Out was shot in part at the school.
