= The Bright Side (film) =

2020 Irish film

- Directed by: Ruth Meehan
- Written by: Ruth Meehan; Jean Pasley
- Story by: Anne Gildea
- Produced by: Tony Deegan
- Starring: Gemma-Leah Devereux; Tom Vaughan-Lawlor; Siobhán Cullen; Kevin McGahern; Ali Hardiman; Tadhg Murphy
- Cinematography: J.J. Rolfe
- Edited by: Colin Campbell
- Music by: Stephen Rennicks
- Release dates: November 9, 2020 (Cork); August 20, 2021 (Ireland)
- Running time: 100 mins.
- Country: Ireland
- Language: English

The Bright Side is a 2020 Irish comedy film, directed by Ruth Meehan, who co-wrote with Jean Pasley, inspired by the Anne Gildea memoir I've Got Cancer, What's Your Excuse?. It stars Gemma-Leah Devereux, Siobhán Cullen, Tom Vaughan-Lawlor, Kevin McGahern, Ali Hardiman, and Tadhg Murphy. It premiered at the Cork International Film Festival in 2020, before being released throughout Ireland the following year.

== Synopsis ==
A stand-up comedian's life changes when she is diagnosed with breast cancer.

== Cast ==
- Gemma-Leah Devereux as Kate McLaughlin
- Siobhán Cullen as Tracy Dunne
- Tom Vaughan-Lawlor as Andy Bourke
- Kevin McGahern as James McLaughlin
- Ali Hardiman as Liz McLaughlin
- Tadhg Murphy as Ray Miller
- Gearóid Farrelly as Tom Turner
- Derbhle Crotty as Helen Richards
- Frank Blake as Dr. Murray
- Philippa Dunne as Receptionist (A&E)

== Reception ==
On the review aggregator website Rotten Tomatoes, 100% of 7 critics' reviews are positive, with an average rating of 8.00/10.

Hilary A. White of the Irish Independent says, "Only those with hearts of stone will be able to resist getting pulled along by The Bright Side's current." Sarah McIntyre of RTÉ rated it 4/5 stars, while praising the directing/writing team of Ruth Meehan & Jean Pasley for "striking the balance between humour and pathos deftly". Daryl MacDonald of InSession Film graded it an A and stated that "the characterizations make it all worthwhile".

Allan Hunter of Screen Daily lauded the "understanding, jagged wit and warmth". Emily Maskell of We Love Cinema rated it 3/5 stars and cited that "it's in the dialogue…where the script excels". Rob Aldam of Backseat Mafia praised Gemma-Leah Devereux for her "brilliant central performance".

Amber Wilkinson of Eye for Film concurred that Devereux "brought complexity" to the character Kate. And Declan Burke of the Irish Examiner also commended the "achingly vulnerable" Tom Vaughan-Lawlor and "superb" Siobhán Cullen for their performances.

But Ben O'Gorman of the Galway Advertiser felt that "the dialogue was a little too unreal". And Rafa Sales-Ross of One Room with a View called it "earnest but unoriginal".
