= Hunted (2012 TV series) =

2012 British television drama series

- Genre: Action; Drama; Spy fiction
- Created by: Frank Spotnitz
- Starring: Melissa George; Adam Rayner; Stephen Dillane; Stephen Campbell Moore; Adewale Akinnuoye-Agbaje; Morven Christie; Lex Shrapnel; Dhafer L'Abidine; Dermot Crowley; Oscar Kennedy; Indira Varma; Patrick Malahide
- Composer: Ruth Barrett
- Country of origin: United Kingdom
- Original language: English
- No. of series: 1
- No. of episodes: 8 (list of episodes)

Production
- Executive producers: Frank Spotnitz; Jane Featherstone; Stephen Garrett; Alison Jackson; Christopher Aird
- Producer: Eliza Mellor
- Cinematography: Balazs Bolygo; Stephan Pehrsson
- Running time: 60 minutes
- Production companies: Kudos and Big Light Productions

Original release
- Network: BBC One (UK); Cinemax (US)
- Release: 4 October – 22 November 2012

Hunted is a 2012 British television drama series created and written by Frank Spotnitz and produced by Kudos and Big Light Productions for British broadcaster BBC, for its main channel BBC One and American premium cable broadcaster Cinemax. The series premiered on Thursday 4 October 2012 on BBC One and on Friday 19 October 2012 on Cinemax.

== Overview ==
Samantha (Melissa George) is an espionage operative for "Byzantium", a private intelligence agency. She survives an attempt on her life, which she strongly suspects was orchestrated by members of the company she works for. After recovering and returning to active duty, she goes back to work undercover as a nanny, not knowing who tried to kill her or whom to trust. It becomes evident that the attempt on her life is tied into a horrific event from her childhood.

== Main cast ==
- Melissa George as Samantha "Sam" Hunter/Alex Kent
- Adam Rayner as Aidan Marsh
- Stephen Dillane as Rupert Keel
- Stephen Campbell Moore as Stephen Turner
- Adewale Akinnuoye-Agbaje as Deacon Crane
- Morven Christie as Zoe Morgan
- Lex Shrapnel as Ian Fowkes
- Dhaffer L'Abidine as Bernard Faroux
- Dermot Crowley as George Ballard
- Oscar Kennedy as Edward Turner
- Indira Varma as Natalie Thorpe
- Patrick Malahide as Jack Turner
- Doc Brown as Tyrone
- Richard Lintern as Hector Stokes
- Scott Handy as Blank-Faced Man
- Uriel Emil Pollack as Hasan Moussa
- Maddy Griffiths as Young Sam
- Jane Riley as Katherine Morton, Sam's Mother

== Production ==
The series was created by Frank Spotnitz (best known as executive producer and head writer for The X-Files), who will write the majority of the episodes of series 1. Spotnitz is executive producing with Kudos' Stephen Garrett (executive producer of Law & Order: UK, Spooks/MI5), Jane Featherstone (producer behind Spooks/MI5, The Hour, Life on Mars), Alison Jackson (Ashes to Ashes, Eternal Law), and BBC's Christopher Aird (Spooks, The Inspector Lynley Mysteries).

After Spotnitz had wrapped up The X-Files he met Stephen Garrett and Jane Featherstone of Kudos Film and Television. They asked him to come to the UK and work with British television. Spotnitz had lived in Europe before and was interested in returning. He claims the idea was appealing but it simply never happened. The years passed and Spotnitz was talking to The X-Files star Gillian Anderson, who was visiting Los Angeles from London where she lives, and she asked, "Would you ever consider doing a show (in Britain)?". Spotnitz started talking to her about doing a spy series and then the first call he made was to Stephen Garrett since the two lost touch. "You know the idea of doing a show in England? I think I may finally have it".

On 13 January 2011, the BBC announced the show – then called Morton. Gillian Anderson was no longer attached to the show; it took Spotnitz and Kudos longer than estimated to get the green light from the BBC and by then, Anderson was too busy with other projects.

Spotnitz relocated to London with his family. While trying to get Hunted off the ground, he served as co-producer and head writer for Strike Back: Project Dawn (or just Strike Back in the United States), which was also produced by HBO for Cinemax, but co-produced with another British broadcaster, BSkyB (for Sky1), not the BBC.

On 22 September 2011, reports confirmed that HBO/Cinemax would come on board as co-producers and that the name Morton had been scrapped and the new name was Nemesis. On 6 March 2012, Spotnitz announced on his homepage that the show's title had been changed again to Hunted.

Spotnitz spent a lot of time researching private spy agencies. He told Screen International: "It's not an area I was very aware of until I went looking for it. Most private contractors don't want to be noticed. Their websites are dry and boring and they don't want the wrong kind of attention. I talked to people who run these companies in the US, United Kingdom and Switzerland and then I researched the type of personality working at them".

Filming started on location in Wales, Scotland, London and Morocco. In early March, scenes were filmed in East Linton, Scotland at a local Deli Shop. "There are no sound stages. It's all location filming. It’s really expensive and difficult to do, but it looks so much better and has a real feel of authenticity", Spotnitz told The Hollywood Reporter. "It's international and it looks international".

During the series, Sam has childhood memories of an oast house and in episode 5 she finds the Oast House. This is the oast house at Little Scotney Farm, Lamberhurst, Kent. It is still a working oast house owned by the National Trust, producing hops to make "Scotney Ale".

The first series takes place mainly in London. Had the show been commissioned for a second series, each series would have taken place in a different European city. George, who is based in New York, would have lived in London for six months to film each series.

=== Sam Hunter spinoff ===
On 25 September 2012, it was reported that British screenwriter Ben Harris had joined the writing team in preparation for a second series pickup from BBC One and Cinemax.

Melissa George has reported that the second series of Hunted would be set in Berlin. The Australian star previously said that her Hunted role "could potentially be long-term", adding that she may be playing Sam "for the next five years".

On 3 November 2012, it was reported that British screenwriter Claire Wilson had joined the writing team in preparation for a second series pickup from BBC One and Cinemax.

However, on 14 November 2012, The Guardian reported that BBC One had decided not to commission a second series of Hunted, citing ratings declines as the primary reason. It was reported the following day that Cinemax was looking into making a second series without the partnership with the BBC. Cinemax has since announced that it is working with Frank Spotnitz to reboot the show, describing the current incarnation as "too expensive" to continue without BBC support.

Spotnitz has revealed that the original plans for Hunted series two – which would have followed Sam Hunter to Germany – have been abandoned in the wake of the series shake-up. "It's going to change – that [Berlin plot] was when we still had the BBC as a partner", he explained. "Now it's one of those funny things where it's the same character, but it's a different series." Spotnitz added that he "would very much expect" future episodes to air in the UK, adding that he has considered other British networks as potential partners.

In June 2013 it was announced that the second series would become a four-hour miniseries called Sam Hunter, airing in 2014.

In early 2015, Frank Spotnitz stated that the series–and spinoff–had been officially cancelled by Cinemax, though he and George were open to continuing the project if it were to be picked up by another network.

== Episode list ==
Hunted 2012 series 1
No.	Title	Directed by	Written by	U.K. air date	U.S. air date	U.K. viewers (millions)	U.S. viewers (millions)
1	"Mort"	S J Clarkson	Frank Spotnitz	4 October 2012	19 October 2012	5.69	0.245
In Tangiers, Sam Hunter sleeps with Bernard Faroux, but then fakes her own death to release Dr. Arthur Hill who Faroux was holding prisoner. She asks her boyfriend, fellow spy Aidan Marsh, to meet her in a cafe, so she can tell him she is pregnant, but while she is waiting, gun men come in, and shoot her in the stomach. A year later, she returns to Byzantium, the spy agency she worked for. Aidan denies hiring the gun men, but he is the only one who knew she was there. Sam and her team fake the kidnapping of young Edward Turner, so that Sam can pretend to save him, and gain the trust of the Turners. She becomes Edward's live-in tutor, allowing her to spy on Jack Turner, a former criminal who is bidding for the Upper Khyber dam in Pakistan. Her boss Keel tells her there is a mole in the team. A mystery man kills Dr. Horst Goebel, and assumes his identity.
2	"LB"	S J Clarkson	Frank Spotnitz	11 October 2012	26 October 2012	4.50	0.166
Someone has reported that Byzantium team member, Hasan Moussa, is the would-be kidnapper. Jack Turner's men have captured him, and brought him to the mansion for questioning. Sam is ordered to kill Hasan to keep him from revealing the operation. The mystery man who is pretending to be Goebel's arrives for an appointment at the Turner's. Sam sneaks in to kill Hasan, but he claims to have information on who hired the gun men in Tangiers. A man identifying himself as an army colonel arrives at the flat of Sam's army friend, and kills her. When Sam goes to investigate, the colonel follows her. They fight, but the colonel gets away. She returns to the Turner house planning to free Hasan, but he Attacks hert, and she is forced to kill him.
3	"Hourglass"	James Strong	Simon Allen	18 October 2012	2 November 2012	4.53	0.181
Sam is ordered to find out how much Turner is planning to bid for the Upper Khyber Dam. At the hotel, Sam runs into Bernard Faroux, the man she tricked in Tangiers. She knocks out his guards, but he pulls a gun on her, and demands she find out how much Turner is planning to bid. Aidan is sleeping with MI-6 liaison officer Natalie Thorpe, feeding her intelligence. Sam kills Faroux, but before he dies he whispers "Hourglass," an operation later discovered to be run by MI-6. Turner needs £30 million more to reach the one billion pound bid to win the auction for the dam .
4	"Kismet"	James Strong	Smita Bhide	25 October 2012	9 November 2012	4.35	0.183
Sam slips out of the house to spy on Jack Turner, who murders the man who developed the software that made him rich. Lewis Conroy, a friend of Stephen's is there for the murder, and they all see a woman flee the scene. The next day Lewis visits the Turner home, and invites Sam for drinks at his place. He confronts her, but she convinces him that it wasn't her. She seduces him into thinking she is going to sleep with him, and then drugs him. It is discovered that Jack Turner has been engineering massive accidents, and profiteering from the aftermath. Aidan is sent to stop the next accident from happening. Sam is overpowered by the mystery man impersonating Dr Goebel, and sedated.
5	"Ambassadors"	Alrick Riley	Frank Spotnitz	1 November 2012	16 November 2012	4.19	0.100
Sam wakes in hospital and is visited by the bogus Doctor Goebel who tells Sam that he is trying to protect her from 'Hourglass'. Aiden is exposed as the mole but escapes from Byzantium and meets Sam. A meeting is arranged for Sam to meet Ballard at the National Portrait Gallery at a cryptic painting called 'The Ambassadors'. Ballard reveals Hourglass is a conspiracy orchestrated by five multinational corporations. Three of the seven members of the Byzantium board are CEOs of Hourglass corporations. Ballard is killed on leaving the gallery. Sam's investigation of the conspirators takes her and Aidan to a country estate. Sam recognises that this is the place where she was taken as a child after her mother Katherine was murdered and she was kidnapped. Byzantium, to protect Sam's cover, set up two innocent people. Jack Turner orders three more murders.
6	"Polyhedrus"	Alrick Riley	Christian Spurrier	8 November 2012	23 November 2012	3.87	0.110
Sam sleeps with Stephen Turner. She finds a pamphlet on Polyhedrus the company that built the Khyber dam with Hill and Goebel's names in it. Byzantium surmises that Jack Turner intends to assassinate Fatima Zahir, a Pakistani presidential candidate opposed to the sale of the dam. She has a secret meeting with the doctor. Fowkes, one of Byzantium's team has infiltrated Turner's gang and unkowingly is part of the assassination plot, not realizing he will be set up to appear to be the perpetrator.. Stephen Turner realizes how ruthless his father is, and seeking information from a corrupt policeman, receives a file revealing Sam's true identity. Keel is suffering from a terminal brain tumour.
7	"Khyber"	Daniel Percival	Frank Spotnitz & Amira El Nemr	15 November 2012	30 November 2012	3.71	0.229
Jack Turner is furious that his bid has been turned down in favour of the Chinese. Byzantium discover their client, which Keel knew, is Polyhedrus fronted by the Chinese. Polyhedrus built the dam but killed nearly 600 villagers that stood in their way, using poison gas. Evidence is in soil samples that Jack Turner has and which Byzantium have been unable to locate for Polyhedrus. Sam discovers it is Polyhedrus that want her dead and the CEO is a director of Byzantium. Keel knows all this and tells Sam he knows what happened when she received treatment in an Istanbul hospital after being shot. Stephen Turner is being turned from Sam by his father.
8	"Snow Maiden"	Daniel Percival	Frank Spotnitz	22 November 2012	7 December 2012	3.89	0.143
Byzantium plants a bomb under Jack Turner's car, but Jack asks his grandson Edward to ride with him, so Sam intervenes to save Edward, making it obvious that she knew about the bomb. Jack surrenders his evidence for testing, but it has been replaced by the mystery man. Jack loses the dam to Polyhedrus. Jack tries to kill the unconscious Sam by drowning her, but she survives, and kills him instead. Polyhedrus, having won the dam intend to kill Sam, so Byzantium fake her death. Sam returns to her mother's home in Scotland, where it is revealed she did not lose her baby which has been looked after by her mother.

== DVD release ==
On 30 July 2013 HBO Home Entertainment released the complete series on DVD in Region 1 via the Warner Archive Collection. This is a manufacture-on-demand (MOD) release, available via WBShop.com and Amazon.com. The series is also available on DVD and Blu-ray in the UK.

== Web campaign ==
Hunted was accompanied by an Internet campaign carrying content developed during the filming of the series. Known for a psychologically stimulating internet campaign where one would guess what dongle went to various computers. It all turned out to be a honeypot.

== Reception ==
On review aggregation website Rotten Tomatoes Hunted holds an approval rating of 76% based on 17 reviews. The critics' consensus reads, "A brisk, exciting spy thriller, Hunted sometimes feels familiar, but it's redeemed by smart, twisty plotting and an assured lead performance from Melissa George." On Metacritic the series has a weighted average score of 70 out of 100, based on 14 critics, indicating "generally favorable" reviews.

UK media reviews of the first episode were mixed. While he liked the plot, Michael Hogan of The Daily Telegraph was critical of the dialogue and acting: "The protagonist pouts constantly and came across more sulky teenager than troubled soul. When you're performing this hokum, you need a heavyweight cast to give it credibility. Spooks had Matthew MacFadyen and Peter Firth, 24 had Kiefer Sutherland, Homeland has Damian Lewis and Claire Danes. Hunted's assorted pretty young things are nowhere near that league. They gazed moodily out of windows but rather than looking haunted by the terrible things they’d seen, they looked like they were waiting for a minicab". The Observer's Andrew Anthony compared the series unfavourably with the U.S. television series Homeland: "Both have high production values, both are capable of creating fiendishly clever plots, but whereas Homeland seeks to foreground character, Hunted relies on shorthand caricature. Thus the three villains on display last week were a macho Arab, an inscrutable psychopath and a cockney gangster-turned-businessman, holding their faces in such ways as to convey, respectively, machismo, psychopathy, and tasty geezerness". Jim Shelley of the Daily Mirror was also critical, writing that Hunted "relied more on old-fashioned Spooks cliches. Locations like Istanbul were viewed as dangerous – ie, full of foreigners, particularly handsome Arabs in suits driving around as if they were in a BMW ad".

On a more positive note, Ken Tucker of Entertainment Weekly, said the U.S. première had "lots of slick suspense, well-turned violence, and a delightful air of menace hanging over everything Sam does". Maureen Ryan of The Huffington Post also had a favorable review of the U.S. premiere saying "To its credit, 'Hunted' doesn't take its profoundly disconnected characters and slap them into a slick, glitzy story about heroism in the face of greed. It marries the doubt, regret and longing they feel into a chugging, twisty spy story about the cost of selling your soul one piece at a time".

== See also ==
- The East—a film about an undercover operative for a private intelligence company
