= Jonathan Oliver =

British author and editor

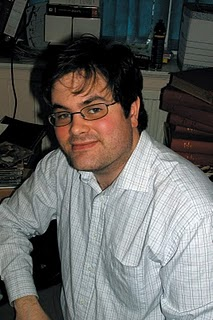
Jonathan Oliver

Jonathan Oliver is a British science fiction, fantasy and horror author and editor.

== Biography ==
After five years working for Taylor & Francis academic publishers, Oliver started working for Rebellion Developments as Graphic Novels Editor on the 2000 AD line in 2006, and launched the Abaddon Books genre fiction imprint. When Rebellion bought the Solaris Books imprint from BL Publishing, Oliver became Editor-in-Chief of both the Abaddon and Solaris imprints.

Oliver's first book as author, Twilight of Kerberos: The Call of Kerberos, the sixth book in Abaddon's Twilight of Kerberos series, was published in October 2009. In September 2010, Abaddon announced the sequel, Twilight of Kerberos: The Wrath of Kerberos, also by Oliver, for a November 2011 publication date. The book has been described as the "beginning of the end" of the shared world series' overarching storyline.

Oliver's first anthology as editor, The End of the Line: An Anthology of Underground Horror, was launched by Solaris at Fantasycon in Nottingham in September 2010. In October 2010, Solaris announced Oliver's second anthology, House of Fear: An Anthology of Haunted House Stories, due for publication in October 2011.

== Bibliography ==
=== As author ===
- Twilight of Kerberos: The Call of Kerberos (October 2009, ISBN 978-1-906735-16-6, Abaddon Books)
- Twilight of Kerberos: The Wrath of Kerberos (Date TBC, ISBN 978-1-907992-35-3, Abaddon Books)

=== As editor ===
- The End of the Line: An Anthology of Underground Horror (September 2010, ISBN 978-1907519338, Solaris Books)
- House of Fear: An Anthology of Haunted House Stories (September 2011, ISBN 978-1-907992-06-3, Solaris Books)
- Magic: An Anthology of the Esoteric and Arcane (October 2012, ISBN 978-1-78108-053-5, Solaris Books)
- End of the Road (November 2013, ISBN 978-1-78108-154-9, Solaris Books)
- World War Cthulhu (December 2013, ISBN 978-0-85744-212-3, Cubicle 7 Entertainment)
- Dangerous Games (December 2014, ISBN 978-1-78108-268-3, Solaris Books)
- Five Stories High (December 2016, ISBN 978-1-78108-391-8, Solaris Books)
