= James Wood (screenwriter) =

British screenwriter

- Occupations: Screenwriter, film director, television producer,
- Writing career
- Notable work: Quacks

James Wood is a British screenwriter.

Wood is perhaps best known for his writing on the BBC adaptation of Evelyn Waugh's Decline and Fall and as a writer and creator of Quacks. When asked how it felt to be the first to take on Waugh's classic novel, Wood replied: "It's a scary thing to do because it’s such a loved book. Lots of people think it's the greatest comic novel in English fiction. So that's the challenge - living up to expectations." Both Decline and Fall and Quacks were well received.

Wood won the 2012 BAFTA for Rev. under the category of Best Situation Comedy.

== Filmography ==
=== Writing ===
Year	Title of work	Director
2002	Casualty	Jeremy Webb
2003	Down to Earth	Michael Cocker
2006	Ancient Rome	Arif Nurmohamed
2007	Hell Bent for Leather	James Wood
2008-09	Heroes and Villains	Nick Green
2008-09	Freezing	Simon Curtis
2012	Vexed	Kieron J. Walsh
2013	Ambassadors	Jeremy Webb
2015	Rev.	Peter Cattaneo
2017	Gap Year	Natalie Bailey
2017	Decline and Fall	Guillem Morales
2017	Quacks	Andy De Emmony
2017	Cold Feet	Louise Hooper
2020	The Great	Ben Chessell
2024	Trying	Ellie Heydon
2025	Malice	Mike Barker; Leonora Lonsdale
