= Decline and Fall (TV series) =

2017 BBC television series

- Genre: Comedy drama
- Based on: Decline and Fall by Evelyn Waugh
- Written by: James Wood
- Directed by: Guillem Morales
- Starring: Jack Whitehall; David Suchet; Eva Longoria; Douglas Hodge; Vincent Franklin; Stephen Graham; Matthew Beard; Oscar Kennedy
- Composer: Paul Englishby
- Country of origin: United Kingdom
- Original language: English
- No. of series: 1
- No. of episodes: 3

Production
- Executive producers: Shane Allen; Ben Cavey; Will Gould; Chris Sussman; Frith Tiplady; James Wood
- Producer: Matthew Bird
- Running time: 55 minutes
- Production companies: Cave Bear Productions; Tiger Aspect Productions

Original release
- Network: BBC One
- Release: 31 March – 14 April 2017

Decline and Fall is a three-part British comedy drama series based on the 1928 novel of the same name by Evelyn Waugh that first aired from 31 March to 14 April 2017 on BBC One. It was adapted by James Wood and directed by Guillem Morales.

== Cast ==
- Jack Whitehall as Paul Pennyfeather
- David Suchet as Dr. Fagan
- Eva Longoria as Margot Beste-Chetwynde
- Douglas Hodge as Grimes
- Vincent Franklin as Prendergast
- Stephen Graham as Philbrick
- Matthew Beard as Arthur Potts
- Oscar Kennedy as Peter Beste-Chetwynde
- Tim Pigott-Smith as Sniggs
- Tom Stourton as Alistair Digby-Vaine-Trumpington
- Katy Wix as Florence Fagan
- Gemma Whelan as Diane Fagan
- Felix Griffin Pain as Tangent
- Hugo Beazley as Clutterbuck
- Tony Guilfoyle as Vicar
- Robert Hughes as Marseille Main Worker
- Eleri Morgan as Jane Jenkins

== Episodes ==
No.	Title	Directed by	Written by	Original release date	UK viewers (millions)
1	"Episode 1"	Guillem Morales	James Wood	31 March 2017	4.49
When Paul Pennyfeather is unfairly expelled from Oxford University, he finds his only option is to go and teach at a substandard boarding school in rural Wales. There he meets a colourful cast of characters, including the alluring Margot Beste-Chetwynde, a wealthy widow with designs on the naive Paul.
2	"Episode 2"	Guillem Morales	James Wood	7 April 2017	Under 3.12
Paul Pennyfeather finds himself tutoring the son of Margot Beste-Chetwynde over the school summer holidays. As he tries to act natural among the higher echelons of 1920s society crowding Margot's elegant home, Paul wonders whether the feelings he fosters for the wealthy and alluring widow are returned.
3	"Episode 3"	Guillem Morales	James Wood	14 April 2017	Under 2.95
Valiantly taking the fall for the murky deeds of Margot, Paul Pennyfeather finds himself in deep trouble with the law. Will Paul be able to escape imprisonment, and will Margot wait for him if he doesn't?
