= Quacks (TV series) =

- The title card, which shows the main four characters moving whilst a photograph is being taken, leading to it being blurred
- Genre: Sitcom
- Created by: James Wood
- Written by: James Wood; Mathew Baynton
- Directed by: Andy De Emmony
- Starring: Rory Kinnear; Mathew Baynton; Tom Basden; Lydia Leonard; Rupert Everett
- Composer: Ian Arber
- Country of origin: United Kingdom
- Original language: English
- No. of series: 1
- No. of episodes: 6

Production
- Executive producers: Justin Davies; James Wood
- Running time: 30 minutes
- Production company: Lucky Giant

Original release
- Network: BBC Two
- Release: 15 August – 19 September 2017

Quacks, created by James Wood, is a BBC sitcom about four Victorian era doctors. The series combines satire, absurdist comedy and traditional slapstick, with stories often being based on real history. Despite generally favourable reviews it was cancelled after one series.

== Cast ==
=== Main characters ===
- Rory Kinnear as Robert Lessing, a showman surgeon who smokes cigarettes and wears a filthy bloodstained apron when performing operations before a public audience.
- Lydia Leonard as Caroline, Robert's professionally- and sexually frustrated wife.
- Mathew Baynton as William, an alienist (an early psychiatrist) and Robert's best friend.
- Tom Basden as John, a dentist and early anaesthetist who experiments freely with drugs and owes money to a loan shark.
- Rupert Everett as Dr Hendricks, the paranoid and anti-Semitic principal of the medical school.

=== Recurring characters ===
- Andy Linden as Fitz, the old warder at the lunatic asylum.
- Adam Ewan as Tom, Robert's working class assistant.
- Osi Okerafor as Butterworth, a debt collector who routinely threatens and assaults John.
- Lisa Jackson as Mina, William's fiancée.
- Miranda Hennesey as Nicola, John's lover.
- Selina Griffiths as a Matron
- Geoffrey McGivern as Landlord
- Ed Gaughan as Peters

=== One-off characters ===
- Millie Thomas as Florence Nightingale.
- Andrew Scott as Charles Dickens.
- Roger Ashton-Griffiths as the Bishop of Lambeth.
- Nicholas Blane as the Duke of Bedford.
- Fenella Woolgar as Lady Campbell.
- Kayvan Novak as Mr Kapoor, an Indian restaurant owner who moonlights as a hypnotist.
- Simon Farnaby as Dr Flowers, purveyor of liniments and lotions.
- Ben Willbond as Patrice Dupont, a renowned surgeon.

== Episodes ==
No.	Title	Directed by	Written by	Original release date	UK viewers (millions)
1	"The Duke's Tracheotomy"	Andy De Emmony	James Wood	15 August 2017	N/A
Robert performs a tracheotomy and removes a malignant tumor on the Duke of Bedford's nose.
2	"The Lady's Abscess"	Andy De Emmony	James Wood	22 August 2017	N/A
Caroline meets Charles Dickens. Meanwhile, Florence Nightingale attempts to take over Robert's surgery.
3	"The Madman's Trial"	Andy De Emmony	Mathew Baynton	29 August 2017	N/A
William attempts to cure a mentally ill patient who fears being guillotined by French Revolutionaries as a nobleman. John resorts to selling toothbrushes and snake oil to clear his debt, Caroline disguises herself as a man to sneak into male-only lectures, and Robert attempts to gain the patronage of a wealthy Duchess.
4	"The Indian Mesmerist"	Andy De Emmony	James Wood	5 September 2017	N/A
Robert invents a device to remove William's bladder stones. Caroline hires a charlatan Indian hypnotist to treat Robert's nightmares and insomnia.
5	"The Bishop's Appendix"	Andy De Emmony	James Wood	12 September 2017	N/A
The Bishop needs his appendix removed, but refuses to take anaesthetic. John falls in love with the apothecary's daughter Nicola, and William attempts to impress the visiting hospital inspector by pretending to cure an actor whom he had paid to feign insanity.
6	"The Physician's Hernia"	Andy De Emmony	James Wood	19 September 2017	N/A
Dr Hendricks is suffering from a hernia and a rival team of doctors are called in.

== Production ==
Chatham Dockyard in Kent doubled as streets of Victorian London. It was also used as the location of the apothecary and bareknuckle boxing fight featured in the series.

== Critical response ==
The series has received positive reviews, with many critics comparing it with Blackadder.

The first episode, which aired on BBC 2 at 10pm on 15 August 2017, received positive reviews from The Independent and The Guardian. Critics like Gerard Gilbert praised the series' originality, and particularly the performance of Lydia Leonard and Rupert Everett. Radio Times noted the similarities to Monty Python and Blackadder, and praised the scriptwriters' ability to weave the series' surreal humour with anecdotes of bizarre real historical events. Reviews generally remained favourable by the time the final series episode aired, with Sean O'Grady of The Independent calling for a second series.
