= Abaddon Books =

British publishing imprint

- Parent company: Rebellion
- Founded: August 2006
- Country of origin: United Kingdom
- Headquarters location: Oxford
- Distribution: Simon & Schuster (US)
- Fiction genres: Science fiction Fantasy; Horror
- Official website: www.abaddonbooks.com

Abaddon Books is a British publishing imprint, founded in 2006. It is part of the Rebellion group of companies, along with publishing companies Solaris Books, 2000 AD, 2000 AD Graphic Novels, and Cubicle 7.

Abaddon publishes "shared world" novels in the horror, science fiction and fantasy genres. Describing itself as a return to "the good old days of pulp fiction", the imprint focuses on shorter, action-driven novels with dark or horrific themes.

The line was founded by Jonathan Oliver, who has been Editor-in-Chief of Abaddon and Solaris Books since Rebellion bought the latter from BL Publishing in 2009.

== Shared-world series ==
Abaddon publishes "shared-world" novels set in a number of narrative settings, with two or more authors writing in each series. Abaddon's editorial team creates the worlds in collaboration with the authors, placing an emphasis on original and engaging ideas:

It's franchise fiction without a franchise. We’re giving writers the spark of an idea and asking, "can you do this?” But we’re not giving them an idea that is based on a game or a film, or anything... we’re just saying: "Wouldn’t it be cool if this kind of fiction existed? Could you write this kind of fiction for us?”

— Jonathan Oliver

The imprint is currently publishing books in six series:

- The Afterblight Chronicles, a post-apocalyptic setting in which cults and warlords run rampant over the survivors of a global plague.
- The Infernal Game, an espionage series incorporating elements of urban fantasy and gothic horror.
- No Man's World, an exploration story about a company of World War I soldiers inexplicably transported to an alien world.
- Pax Britannia, a steampunk alternate history in which a 160-year-old Queen Victoria still governs the British Empire towards the end of the twentieth century.
- Tomes of the Dead, not a single shared world, but a series of stand-alone zombie stories marked by subversion or reinterpretation of the genre.
- Twilight of Kerberos, a "sword and sorcery" setting on a small world orbiting the gas giant Kerberos, inhabited by the remnants of lost civilizations.
- Malory's Knights of Albion, a series of Arthurian stories supposedly drawn from Thomas Malory's unpublished sequel to Le Morte D'Arthur, with 3 titles.

A further two series were launched in the imprint's first year, but have since ceased:

- Dreams of Inan, a science fantasy series set on a futuristic world in which magic acts as a nuclear-style deterrent. The series concluded with The Worm That Wasn't in 2007.
- Sniper Elite, an alternate history based in the world of the Sniper Elite games. The series included only a single book, The Spear of Destiny, in 2006.

== Publications ==
The following titles have been previously published or are announced as upcoming.

All releases prior to 2009, and most releases since, have featured cover art by Greg Staples or Mark Harrison; covers for the new The Infernal Game and No Man's World titles, and for the upcoming omnibus editions, have been created by 2000 AD staff designers Simon Parr and Luke Preece.

=== The Afterblight Chronicles ===
==== Novels ====
1. Spurrier, Simon (August 2006). The Culled. Abaddon. ISBN 978-1-905437-01-6.
2. Levene, Rebecca (April 2007). Kill or Cure. Simon and Schuster. ISBN 978-1-905437-32-0.
3. Andrews, Scott K. (August 2007). School's Out. Abaddon. ISBN 9781905437405.
4. Bark, Jaspre (April 2008). Dawn Over Doomsday. Abaddon. ISBN 978-1-905437-62-7.
5. Kane, Paul (September 2008). Arrowhead. Abaddon. ISBN 978-1-905437-76-4.
6. Andrews, Scott K. (May 2009). Operation Motherland. Abaddon. ISBN 978-1-906735-04-3.
7. Ewing, Al (October 2009). Death Got No Mercy. Abaddon. ISBN 978-1-906735-15-9.
8. Kane, Paul (November 2009). Broken Arrow. Abaddon. ISBN 978-1-906735-27-2.
9. Andrews, Scott K. (August 2010). Children's Crusade. UK-ISBN 978-1-906735-53-1, US-ISBN 978-1-906735-81-4.
10. Kane, Paul (September 2010). Arrowland. UK-ISBN 978-1-907519-13-0, US-ISBN 978-1-907519-12-3.
11. Ochse, Weston (2012). Blood Ocean. Abaddon. ISBN 9781907992872.
12. Andrews, Scott K. (September 2012). School's Out Forever. Abaddon. ISBN 9781781080269.
13. Cross, Malcolm (January 2014). Orbital Decay. ISBN 9781849976787.
14. Harvey, C.B. (February 2014). Dead Kelly. ISBN 9781849976800.
15. Tchaikovsky, Adrian (July 2014). The Bloody Deluge. Abaddon Books. ISBN 9781849977647.

==== Omnibus collections ====
- Cross, Malcolm; Harvey, C.B. & Tchaikovsky, Adrian (August 2014). Journal of the Plague Year: an Omnibus of Post-Apocalyptic Tales. Abaddon. ISBN 9781781082461. Includes: Orbital Decay, Dead Kelly, and The Bloody Deluge.
- Spurrier, Simon; Levene, Rebecca & Ewing, Al (June 2011). The Afterblight Chronicles Omnibus, Volume 1: America. Abaddon. ISBN 9781907992148. Includes: The Culled, Kill or Cure, and Death Got No Mercy.

=== The Infernal Game ===
- Cold Warriors (Rebecca Levene, February 2010, UK-ISBN 978-1-906735-36-4, US-ISBN 978-1-906735-83-8)
- Ghost Dance (Rebecca Levene, August 2010, UK-ISBN 978-1-906735-38-8, US-ISBN 978-1-907519-03-1)

=== No Man's World ===
- Black Hand Gang (Pat Kelleher, February 2010, UK-ISBN 978-1-906735-35-7, US-ISBN 978-1-906735-84-5)

=== Pax Britannia ===
- Unnatural History (Jonathan Green, February 2007, ISBN 978-1-905437-10-8)
- El Sombra (Al Ewing, June 2007, ISBN 978-1-905437-34-4)
- Leviathan Rising (Jonathan Green, March 2008, ISBN 978-1-905437-60-3)
- Human Nature (Jonathan Green, December 2008, ISBN 978-1-905437-86-3)
- Evolution Expects (Jonathan Green, May 2009, ISBN 978-1-906735-05-0)
- Blood Royal (Jonathan Green, August 2010 UK-ISBN 978-1-906735-30-2, US-ISBN 978-1-907519-37-6)
- Gods of Manhattan (Al Ewing September 2010, UK-ISBN 978-1-906735-39-5, US-ISBN 978-1-906735-86-9)
- Dark Side (Jonathan Green, September 2011, UK-ISBN 978-1-906735-40-1, US-ISBN 978-1-906735-85-2)
- The Quicksilver Omnibus, Volume 1 (Jonathan Green, May 2011, UK-ISBN 978-1-907519-36-9, US-ISBN 978-1-907519-56-7)
- Pax Omega (Al Ewing, April 2012, ISBN 1-907992-91-X)

=== Tomes of the Dead ===
- Death Hulk (Matthew Sprange, August 2006, ISBN 978-1-905437-03-0)
- The Words of Their Roaring (Matthew Smith, May 2007, ISBN 978-1-905437-13-9)
- The Devil's Plague (Mark Beynon, October 2007, ISBN 978-1-905437-41-2)
- I, Zombie (Al Ewing, June 2008, ISBN 978-1-905437-72-6)
- Anno Mortis (Rebecca Levene, November 2008, ISBN 978-1-905437-85-6)
- Way of the Barefoot Zombie (Jasper Bark, June 2009, ISBN 978-1-906735-06-7)
- Tide of Souls (Simon Bestwick, July 2009, ISBN 978-1-906735-14-2)
- Hungry Hearts (Gary McMahon, November 2009, ISBN 978-1-906735-26-5)
- Empire of Salt (Weston Ochse, April 2010, ISBN 978-1-906735-32-6)
- Stronghold (Paul Finch, August 2010, ISBN 978-1-907519-10-9)
- The Best of Tomes of the Dead, Volume 1 (Matthew Smith, Al Ewing and Rebecca Levene, Date TBC, UK-ISBN 978-1-907519-34-5, US-ISBN 978-1-907519-35-2)
- The Viking Dead (Toby Venables, Date TBC, UK-ISBN 978-1-907519-68-0, US-ISBN 978-1-907519-69-7)

=== Twilight of Kerberos ===
1. Shadowmage (Matthew Sprange, February 2008, ISBN 978-1-905437-54-2)
2. The Clockwork King of Orl (Mike Wild, August 2008, ISBN 978-1-905437-75-7)
3. The Light of Heaven (David A. McIntee, February 2009, ISBN 978-1-905437-87-0)
4. The Crucible of the Dragon God (Mike Wild, June 2009, ISBN 978-1-906735-13-5)
5. The Call of Kerberos (Jonathan Oliver, October 2009, ISBN 978-1-906735-16-6)
6. Night's Haunting (Matthew Sprange, October 2009, ISBN 978-1-906735-25-8)
7. Engines of the Apocalypse (Mike Wild, August 2010, UK-ISBN 978-1-906735-37-1, US-ISBN 978-1-906735-79-1)
8. The Trials of Trass Kathra (Mike Wild, Date TBC, UK-ISBN 978-1-907519-64-2, US-ISBN 978-1-907519-65-9)
9. The Wrath of Kerberos (Jonathan Oliver, Date TBC, ISBN TBC)

=== Malory's Knights of Albion ===
- The Black Chalice (Steven Savile, Date TBC, UK-ISBN 978-1-907519-66-6, US-ISBN 978-1-907519-67-3)
- The Savage Knight (Paul Lewis, Date TBC, UK-ISBN 978-1-907992-33-9, US-ISBN 978-1-907992-34-6)
- Dark North (Paul Finch March 2012 ISBN 978-1907992889)

=== Dreams of Inan ===
- A Kind of Peace (Andy Boot, August 2006, ISBN 978-1-905437-02-3)
- Stealing Life (Antony Johnston, January 2007, ISBN 978-1-905437-12-2)
- The Worm That Wasn't (Mike Maddox, December 2007, ISBN 978-1-905437-53-5)

=== Sniper Elite ===
- Sniper Elite: The Spear of Destiny (Jasper Bark, August 2006, ISBN 978-1-905437-04-7)

=== Judges ===
- The Avalanche (Michael Carroll, May 2018, ISBN 978-1-78108-565-3)
- When the Light Lay Still (Charles J. Eskew, August 2018)
- Lone Wolf (George Mann, September 2018)

== Other media ==
=== Films ===
- In October 2010, Amber Entertainment announced that it had optioned the movie rights for Tomes of the Dead: Stronghold (2010), to be produced by Amber's Ileen Maisel and directed by Rebellion's Jason Kingsley.
