= Toast (film) =

2010 film directed by S. J. Clarkson

- DVD Cover
- Written by: Lee Hall
- Directed by: S. J. Clarkson
- Starring: Helena Bonham Carter; Freddie Highmore; Ken Stott; Oscar Kennedy; Frasier Huckle; Sarah Middleton; Victoria Hamilton; Corrinne Wicks; Amy Marston
- Music by: Matt Biffa
- Country of origin: United Kingdom
- Original language: English

Production
- Producers: Nicole Finnan; Alison Owen; Eugenio Pérez; Paul Trijbits; Faye Ward
- Cinematography: Balazs Bolygo
- Editor: Liana Del Giudice
- Running time: 96 minutes
- Production companies: K5 International; Ruby Film and Television; BBC Films; Screen WM

Original release
- Network: BBC One
- Release: 30 December 2010

Toast is a 2010 British biographical comedy-drama film based on the autobiographical novel of the same name by the cookery writer Nigel Slater. The film was directed by S. J. Clarkson and written by Lee Hall. The cast includes Freddie Highmore, Helena Bonham Carter, Ken Stott and Oscar Kennedy. It received a gala at the 2011 Berlin International Film Festival. As a television film it was first broadcast on BBC One on 30 December 2010 and was given a theatrical release in cinemas on 11 August 2011.

In 2018, it was adapted for stage by Henry Filloux-Bennett. It first premiered at Week 53 Festival in March with a subsequent run at the Edinburgh Festival Fringe. In April 2019, it opened in London at The Other Palace.

== Plot ==
Mr and Mrs Slater, along with their young son Nigel, live in their Wolverhampton home. Their daily life revolves mostly around Mr Slater's job at the factory and Mrs Slater's homemaking, which is constantly hindered by her chronic debilitating asthma, while her cooking is limited to heating canned goods. Although Nigel finds comfort and encouragement to nourish his interest in culinary matters from his gentle mother, he struggles to connect with his cantankerous father, who often criticises him. He also has a crush on the handsome gardener. Whenever dinner is burnt, the standard substitute of toast is always served, which leaves a deep impression on the boy. Eventually, his mother succumbs to the illness, leaving her husband stumbling through widowerhood with the same heated canned foods, frequent dinners of toast sprinkled with occasional attempts by Nigel per his friend's advice to connect with his father.

The new housekeeper, married and "common" Mrs Joan Potter, enters their life and draws Mr. Slater's attention with her sublime meals. The two start to embrace a romantic relationship despite Nigel's disdain for Mrs Potter and her marriage. Without announcement, the Slaters move to the Herefordshire countryside along with Mrs Potter and Nigel finds himself begrudgingly forced to co-exist with Mrs Potter. Once he reaches teenage years, Nigel shows passion and culinary talent during home economics class cookery lessons. This prompts a silent competition for Mr Slater's approval between the teen and Mrs Potter that erupts when Nigel manages to bake a lemon meringue pie that rivals her supposedly unbeatable dessert.

Mr Slater eventually marries Joan and becomes more unbearable from the excessive consumption of Mrs Potter's cooking. Nigel reaches a boiling point with his stepmother when he starts working at the local pub's restaurant to hone his skills in more sophisticated cooking, which she perceives as a threat. One day, while on a walk in the woods with the pub owner's son, who is training at ballet school, Nigel and the young man share a kiss, stirring Nigel's sexual awareness. He encourages Nigel to take a chance at the world beyond his home.

Nigel, upon being informed by Joan of his father's death, declares to the newly widowed woman that she has won and resolves to move to London and establish his own life. At The Savoy Hotel, he is interviewed for a kitchen job by a toast-snacking chef and hired, much to his disbelief. Nigel is reassured of his future by the chef, who gives him a chef's jacket embroidered with "Savoy London" and Nigel cracks a smile.

== Cast ==
- Helena Bonham Carter as Joan Potter
- Freddie Highmore as teenage Nigel Slater
  - Oscar Kennedy as child Nigel Slater (acting debut)
- Ken Stott as Dad
- Frasier Huckle as Warrel
- Victoria Hamilton as Mum
- Matthew McNulty as Josh
- Clare Higgins as Mavis
- Ben Aldridge as Stuart
- Selina Cadell as Ruby
- Sarah Middleton as Beany
- Kia Pegg as Primary School Girl
- Corrinne Wicks as Secondary school teacher
- Amy Marston as Primary school teacher
- Nigel Slater as Chef

== Production ==
The chief filming location was in Birmingham and Worcestershire with the Black Country Living Museum transformed into 1960's Wolverhampton, and in Walton Pool House in Clent. Principal sets were constructed in a disused bank on Broad St. The only inclement weather encountered during filming was at Penarth which resulted in script changes to reflect the cold wet conditions. Filming lasted 1 month, from 21 June to 24 July 2010.

== Critical reception ==
On the review aggregator website Rotten Tomatoes, 63% of 35 critics' reviews are positive, with an average rating of 6.1/10.

Writing for The Seattle Times, Tom Keogh gave the film 3 out of 4 stars, stating that "the movie has three things deserving of adoration: spectacular lemon-meringue pies, the songs of Dusty Springfield, and Helena Bonham Carter". Gary Goldstein of the Los Angeles Times wrote that "Toast is by turns sweet and tart, airy and rich and, above all, a thoroughly irresistible confection", giving the movie 4 out of 5 stars. In a more mild review, Stephanie Merry of The Washington Post wrote: "For the most part, the movie feels like an emotional vacuum, mirroring the drab vanilla and mint green interiors of the Slaters' home".
