= Solaris Books =

Speculative fiction publishing company

- Parent company: Profile Books
- Founded: February 2007
- Country of origin: United Kingdom
- Headquarters location: Oxford
- Distribution: Simon & Schuster
- Key people: Jonathan Oliver (Editor-in-Chief)
- Publication types: Books
- Fiction genres: Science fiction Fantasy; Dark fantasy
- Official website: www.solarisbooks.com

Solaris Books is an imprint which focuses on publishing science fiction, fantasy and dark fantasy novels and anthologies. The range includes titles by both established and new authors. The range is owned by Profile Books and until September 2026 distributed to the UK and US booktrade via local divisions of Simon & Schuster.

== History ==
Solaris Books was founded in February 2007 by BL Publishing, to trade alongside their existing licence-based imprint the Black Library, and the then-existing Black Flame imprint. When asked why BLP had started the new imprint, Consulting Editor George Mann stated that "...between... the major corporate publishers... and... the small and independent press... there seems to be little or no room left for the midlist," and that Solaris would provide a mass-market platform for up-and-coming writers, or established writers with smaller readerships.

In September 2009, it was announced that Solaris Books had been bought by Rebellion Developments, who also publish comics and graphic novels under 2000 AD imprint and genre fiction under the Abaddon Books imprint, for an undisclosed sum. The imprint came under the leadership of Abaddon editor Jonathan Oliver, who ran both imprints side by side as Editor-in-Chief, along with editors David Moore and Jenni Hill.

As of August 2023, Solaris had published over 300 titles, including anthologies and new editions of out-of-print titles.

In June 2026 it was announced that the imprint had been sold to Profile Books for an undisclosed sum. An initial transfer of ebook sales would occur on the 1st of July, which physical sales to transfer in September.

== Publications ==
- Arch Wizard (by Ed Greenwood, December 2008, ISBN 978-1-84416-651-0)
- Bitterwood (by James Maxey, July 2007, ISBN 978-1-84416-487-5)
- Dante's Girl (by Natasha Rhodes, March 2007, ISBN 1-84416-666-X)
- Dark Lord (by Ed Greenwood, September 2007, ISBN 978-1-84416-519-3)
- Deadstock (by Jeffrey Thomas, March 2007, ISBN 1-84416-447-0)
- Helix: (by Eric Brown, June 2007, ISBN 1-84416-469-1)
- House of Fear Anthology edited by Jonathan Oliver ISBN 978-1-907992-06-3
- Infinity Plus (edited by Keith Brooke and Nick Gevers, August 2007, ISBN 978-1-84416-489-9)
- Phoenicia's Worlds (by Ben Jeapes, 2013)
- Set the Seas on Fire (by Chris Roberson, August 2007, ISBN 978-1-84416-488-2)
- Splinter (by Adam Roberts, September 2007, ISBN 978-1-84416-490-5)
- The Solaris Book of New Fantasy (edited by George Mann, December 2007, ISBN 978-1-84416-523-0)
- The Solaris Book of New Science Fiction (edited by George Mann, February 2007, ISBN 1-84416-374-1)
- The Solaris Book of New Science Fiction, Volume Two (edited by George Mann, 2008, ISBN 978-1-84416-542-1)
- The Solaris Book of New Science Fiction, Volume Three (edited by George Mann, 2009, ISBN 978-1-84416-709-8)
- The Summoner (by Gail Z. Martin, February 2007, ISBN 1-84416-468-3)
- The Touch (by Brian Lumley, March 2007, ISBN 978-1-84416-485-1)
- Thief With No Shadow (by Emily Gee, May 2007, ISBN 1-84416-469-1)

== Awards ==
- Alastair Reynolds' story "The Fixation", from The Solaris Book of New Science Fiction: Volume Three, won the 2009 Sidewise Award for Alternate History (Short Form).
- Chris Roberson's The Dragon's Nine Sons won the 2008 Sidewise Award for Alternate History (Long Form).
- Ellen Datlow's Poe Anthology won the 2010 Black Quill Award for Best Dark Genre Anthology (Readers' Choice), and the 2010 Shirley Jackson Award for an Edited Anthology, and was nominated for the 2010 Bram Stoker Award for Superior Achievement in an Anthology.
- Mary Robinette Kowal's story "Evil Robot Monkey", from The Solaris Book of New Science Fiction: Volume Two, was nominated for the 2009 Hugo Award for Best Short Story.
- Mary Rosenblum's story "Sacrifice", from Sideways in Crime, won the 2008 Sidewise Award for Alternate History (Short Form). Tobias Buckell's story "The People's Machine", and Kristine Kathryn Rusch's story "G-Men", both from Sideways in Crime, were nominated in the same category.
- Paul Cornell's story "One of Our Bastards is Missing", from The Solaris Book of New Science Fiction: Volume Three, was nominated for the 2010 Hugo Award for Best Novelette.
- Stephen Baxter's story "Last Contact", from The Solaris Book of New Science Fiction, was a finalist in the 2008 Locus Award for Short Story and a nominee for the 2008 Hugo Award for Short Story.
- Pat Cadigan's story "The Girl-Thing Who Went Out for Sushi", published in the anthology Edge of Infinity, won the 2013 Hugo Award for Best Novelette.

== See also ==
- 2000 AD, a comics anthology, publishing fiction featuring characters such as Judge Dredd and, through their sister comics magazine Judge Dredd Megazine, Tank Girl
- Abaddon Books, another Rebellion imprint releasing speculative fiction novels in a number of themed lines
- Black Flame, another BL Publishing imprint largely focused on licensed franchises
