= Wreck (TV series) =

- Promotional poster for the series
- Genre: Comedy horror; Slasher
- Created by: Ryan J. Brown
- Written by: Ryan J. Brown
- Directed by: Chris Baugh; Louis Paxton
- Starring: Oscar Kennedy; Thaddea Graham; Anthony Rickman; Louis Boyer; Alice Nokes; Peter Claffey; Miya Ocego; Jodie Tyack; Amber Grappy
- Composer: Steve Lynch
- Country of origin: United Kingdom
- Original language: English
- No. of series: 2
- No. of episodes: 12

Production
- Executive producers: Noemi Spanos; Chris Baugh
- Producer: Brendan Mullin
- Cinematography: Ryan Kernaghan
- Editor: Brian Philip Davis
- Running time: approx. 45 mins
- Production company: Euston Films

Original release
- Network: BBC Three
- Release: 9 October 2022 – 10 April 2024

Wreck (originally titled Wrecked) is a British comedy horror television series, created and written by Ryan J. Brown. It stars Oscar Kennedy as Jamie, a young man who takes a job on board a cruise ship in order to investigate the disappearance of his sister. It premiered on BBC Three on 9 October 2022, with all episodes airing on BBC iPlayer on the same day. The show was renewed for a second series in October 2022, and set for broadcast in 2024. The second series premiered on 26 March 2024.

The series received mixed reviews from critics but proved a hit with audiences. In particular, the show was received favourably by the LGBTQ+ press with Attitude, Gay Times and The Queer Review featuring the series on their lists of Top LGBT TV Shows of 2022.

== Cast and characters ==
=== Main ===
- Oscar Kennedy as Jamie Walsh, a nineteen-year-old who takes a job on the Sacramentum to find out what happened to his sister.
- Thaddea Graham as Vivian Lim, one of Jamie's colleagues who works on the Sacramentum after fleeing her homophobic family.
- Anthony Rickman as Olly Reyes (season 1; recurring season 2), a member of the Sacramentum's crew who befriends Jamie and Vivian.
- Louis Boyer as Sam Rhodes (season 1), an officer on the Sacramentum.
- Alice Nokes as Sophia Leigh, queen bee of the Sacramentum's entertainment team.
- Peter Claffey as Cormac Kelly, Jamie's friend with whom he switches identities in order to get onto the Sacramentum.
- Miya Ocego as Rosie Preston, Cormac's ex-girlfriend and a transgender woman who works as a Cher impersonator.
- Jodie Tyack as Pippa Walsh (season 2; guest season 1), Jamie's sister who disappeared while working on the Sacramentum.
- Amber Grappy as Lauren Thompson (season 2; recurring season 1), one of Jamie and Vivian's colleagues.

=== Recurring ===
- Harriet Webb as Karen MacIntyre, the crew manager of the Sacramentum
- Warren James Dunning as Officer Beaker, an officer on the Sacramentum and Karen's second-in-command
- James Phoon as Hamish Campbell, a member of the Sacramentum's entertainment team
- Ali Hardiman as Bethany-May, a member of the Sacramentum's entertainment team
- Melissa Dilber and Merih Dilber as Amy #1 and Amy #2, twin sisters who are members of the Sacramentum's entertainment team
- Francis Flores as The Baby, the Sacramentum's tattooist
- Panti Bliss as Brian/Gloria P. Hole, a drag queen employed on the Sacramentum

Series One

- Jack Rowan as Danny Jones, Pippa's ex-boyfriend and a member of the entertainment team.
- Diego Andres as Jerome Dupont, one of Jamie and Vivian's colleagues
- Louise Parker as Jenny, one of Jamie and Vivian's colleagues
- Georgia Goodman as Dolce, a cleaner on the Sacramentum
- Ramanique Ahluwalia as Lily Tee, a wealthy guest on board the Sacramentum
- Ned Costello as Nile, a wealthy guest on board the Sacramentum and Lily's stepbrother
- Donald Sage Mackay as Henry Allan, the director of the Sacramentum
- Marcia Lecky as Detective Martinez, a detective who boards the Sacramentum to investigate a suspicious death

Series Two

- Orlando Norman as Ben Matthews, a Velorum employee who investigates Exodum festival
- Niamh Walsh as Devon Deveraux, a member of the wealthy family who own Velorum
- Sam Buttery as Jean, Devon's personal assistant
- Buck Braithwaite as Tristan, a member of the events team at Exodum
- Greg Austin as Joseph Murphy, a psychiatrist at Exodum
- Carolyn Bracken as Maggie Gravell, founder of O, a group dedicated to bringing down Velorum
- Shaheen Jafargholi as Billy Ahmadi, a member of O
- Bradley Riches as Freddie, a prisoner at Exodum
- Alan Dale as Owen Deveraux, patriarch of the family who own Velorum
- Joseph Arkley as Thomas Deveraux, COO of Velorum, Owen's son, and Devon's brother
- Phil Martin as The Creep, Beaker's accomplice

== Production ==
BBC Three commissioned Wrecked from Euston Films in March 2021. Written by Ryan J. Brown and directed by Chris Baugh, the six 45-minute episode series is executive produced by Noemi Spanos for Euston Films and Tommy Bulfin for the BBC.

While writing the show, Brown purposefully included explicit LGBT themes (both Jamie and Vivian are gay), explaining that "as a gay man and horror fan, I think horror has always been queer but it's always coded, and subtext. I thought, 'let's do away with the subtext. Let's have explicit representation" and adding that he was used to LGBT characters always being the sidekicks in horror content. Simultaneously, Brown was careful to ensure that Jamie and Vivian's sexuality did not define them as characters but that he did not dismiss this either, noting that "growing up gay has equipped them to be the perfect heroes but the story doesn't need to be about their trauma".

The cast was confirmed in March 2022, with Oscar Kennedy set to star as the lead Jamie. Also part of the cast were Thaddea Graham, Jack Rowan, and Jodie Tyack as well as Louis Boyer, Anthony Rickman, Amber Grappy, Diego Andres, Peter Claffey, Miya Ocego, Warren James Dunning, Ramanique Ahluwalia, and Alice Nokes. In a video posted to Instagram, Brown explained that Jamie is named after Jamie Lee Curtis, best known for playing Laurie Strode in the Halloween film franchise, and Jesse Walsh, the character played by Mark Patton in A Nightmare on Elm Street 2: Freddy's Revenge, whom he dubbed the "first male scream queen".

Principal photography took place in Northern Ireland.

In October 2022, prior to the first series' broadcast, it was announced that a second series of the show has been in development, and that the show was designed to run for at least three.

Principal photography for the second series returned to Northern Ireland and lasted for four months between May 11 and September 1, 2023. Director Chris Baugh explained that the challenges of creating a realistic cruise ship in a warehouse was particularly challenging during production of series one, in contrast of the filming of the second series which was largely outdoors and more dependent on the weather. He cited The Wicker Man, Friday the 13th, The Final Girls, and The Evil Dead as particular influences on the second series.

The release date for the second series was announced on 8 March 2024, alongside the news that Bradley Riches, Alan Dale, Shaheen Jafargholi, Phil Martin, Orlando Norman, Sam Buttery, Greg Austin, Carolyn Bracken, Niamh Walsh, and Buck Braithwaite were joining the cast.

== Episodes ==
All episodes were made available on BBC iPlayer prior to their linear broadcast.

Series	Episodes	Originally released	
Series	Episodes	First released	Last released
1	6	9 October 2022	24 October 2022
2	6	26 March 2024	10 April 2024

=== Series 1 (2022) ===
No.	Title	Directed by	Written by	BBC Three air date
1	"Ship of Dreams"	Chris Baugh	Ryan J. Brown	9 October 2022
Pippa, a worker on the Sacramentum cruise ship, is ambushed and pursued by someone in a duck costume wielding a knife. In order to escape, she jumps from the back of the boat. Three months later, Pippa's brother Jamie signs up to work on the Sacramentum's next tour, having switched places with his friend Cormac, in order to find out what happened to her. He is shocked to find the real Cormac is also on the boat, having snuck aboard to try and get back together with his girlfriend Rosie. Jamie reveals to his colleague Vivian that his father doesn't know he is on the boat and his mother died when he was young. They witness Danny dealing drugs to one of the ship's crew. Sophia and Bethany-May, members of the ship's entertainment team and Pippa's friends, discuss what happened to her and Bethany-May expresses regret but is talked out of leaving by Danny and Sophia. Searching Danny's room, Jamie finds Pippa's phone hidden under the bed. Vivian discovers Cormac in Jamie's room and he reveals his plan to her, stating that the cruise company, Velorum, covered up Pippa's disappearance by saying that she had committed suicide. Jamie and Vivian are initiated into the crew by people in duck masks and Jamie tries to ask Danny about Pippa, who states that he dumped her when she became too clingy. That night, the duck murders Danny and hides his body in a secret room.
2	"Catch of the Day"	Chris Baugh	Ryan J. Brown	10 October 2022
In a flashback, Pippa reluctantly submits her job application to work on the Sacramentum but is wary of leaving Jamie at home with their alcoholic father. Jamie and Vivian overhear the entertainers being informed that Danny has taken his own life after his body is found by Lauren in the pool. Sophia tells Sam that she and the other entertainers want to stop selling drugs, rattled after what happened to Pippa and Danny. Following this, she finds her photograph in the bathroom with the eyes crossed out. On Pippa's phone, Jamie finds out that she was extorting an unknown man with a fish tattoo in order to get passage off of the ship. In the ship's morgue, Jamie and Vivian discover that Danny was murdered and call the Police. At Cormac's suggestion, Jamie asks Olly to get him a meeting with the ship's tattooist, who tells them that the man with the fish tattoo is an officer. Olly and Jamie then share a kiss. Seeing Rosie, Cormac leaves Jamie's room and runs into Beaker, who invites him to play basketball with the other officers after Cormac lies that his name is Paul. Jamie tells Vivian that he feels guilty about convincing Pippa to work on the Sacramentum. At Danny's vigil, Beaker intimidates Sophia into continuing to sell drugs and she is then pursued by a masked person with a knife. Jamie saves Sophia from the attacker, who escapes and is revealed to be Olly.
3	"Showtime!"	Chris Baugh	Ryan J. Brown	16 October 2022
In the flashback, Pippa and the other entertainers deal drugs on the Sacramentum. In the present, Jamie tries to convince Sophia to come forward about the attack to Detective Martinez, who arrives on the ship to investigate Danny's death. Sophia refuses out of fear that Beaker will blame her for the drug operation, so Jamie agrees to steal the drug supply from the officers in exchange for Sophia telling Martinez the truth. Sophia tells Jamie that Pippa made a lot of enemies on the ship and was paranoid that she was being watched, which caused her to have a nervous breakdown and jump off the boat. When a staff member collapses after taking drugs, Cormac is discovered by Sam during a contraband search but escapes and runs into Rosie, who rebuffs him for lying about not coming on the ship with her. Cormac tries to win Rosie back by revealing Jamie's true identity. The Sacramentum's director Henry Allan pays off Martinez to keep Danny's murder a secret. Olly and Jamie grow closer, but Jamie discovers the disguise used by Sophia's attacker when Beaker searches his room for drugs. Jamie destroys the officer's drug supply but Sophia reneges on her part of the deal. Olly tells Jamie that the mafia forced him to scare Sophia but that he didn't do anything to Danny. Dolce, the head of the mafia, confirms Olly's story and explains that Martinez is leaving the Sacramentum, despite Jamie's protestations. Vivian starts a relationship with Lily, a guest on the ship. After accidentally seeing him have sex with Sophia, Cormac reveals to Jamie that Sam is the man with the fish tattoo that Pippa was extorting. Jerome, one of the crew members, is murdered by an unknown attacker.
4	"The Sacramentum Slasher"	Chris Baugh	Ryan J. Brown	17 October 2022
In the flashback, Pippa comforts Jamie after he is attacked for being gay. Lauren becomes concerned when she doesn't hear from Jerome but Karen brushes it off. Olly tries to build bridges with Jamie and they arrange a date. Sam confronts Jamie and admits he blames himself for Pippa's suicide, stating that she found out he was married after he agreed to run away with her. When Jamie tells Sam that Danny was murdered, he ends things with Sophia and gives Jamie the incident reports about Pippa. Lily's stepbrother Nile warns Vivian that she is dating her for a bet but the two later reconcile. Jamie and Vivian sneak into Pippa's old room, which is now Bethany-May's, and find a map of the ship and a list of names. Rosie and Cormac cause a distraction to allow Jamie and Vivian access to the personnel records, where they find that Karen has logged that all of the people on Pippa's list have absconded, including Jerome. Jamie reports this to Sam, who attacks him and confesses that he chased Pippa and watched her jump from the boat. When Jamie tries to escape, he is cornered by the other officers and knocked out by Karen.
5	"Needle in a Gaystack"	Chris Baugh	Ryan J. Brown	23 October 2022
In the flashback, Pippa and Sam have dinner in a guest's room where he admits he loves her. In the present, Jamie wakes up next to Jerome's body in the secret room and overhears Karen ordering Beaker and the other officers to find Vivian. Karen tells Sam to kill Jamie, but he escapes and finds Olly, where he reveals his true identity and tells him about Pippa. Vivian, Rosie, Vivian and Lily meet up with Jamie and Olly and tells them that Sam killed Jerome, Pippa and the others on her list. Vivian states that Jerome's body is the only proof they have of what's happened. Karen threatens the other crew to hunt down Jamie and Vivian. While Vivian hides in Lily's apartment, Jamie and the others use Pippa's map of the ship to locate the secret room and find out the officers have been spying on them. Jamie and Olly reach Jerome's body but are found by Karen, who takes them to Henry's offices where they are forced to watch a housekeeper be murdered by a couple of Whales, wealthy guests who have paid to kill crew members. In the apartment, Nile states that he tried to warn Vivian to stay away from Lily, who then arrives and reveals that Vivian has been selected as the next victim of the Whales' game.
6	"Water off a Duck's Back"	Chris Baugh	Ryan J. Brown	24 October 2022
In the flashback, Pippa texts a mystery person telling them they have enough proof about what is happening on the ship. In the present, Henry reveals that Sam murdered Pippa because she got too close to exposing the operation and then killed Danny out of fear that Pippa had told him what was going on. Henry then murders Sam in front of them for failing. Beaker almost kills Olly to force Jamie to tell him who else they've been working with, but they are saved by Cormac and Rosie. Lily tells Henry that she wants to kill Vivian that night. Jamie reveals the truth to the rest of the crew who, when backed up by Sophia, convinces them to fight back. Olly recruits the mafia, who team up with the crew to take down Beaker and the officers while Jamie goes to rescue Vivian. Karen tries to get Henry to evacuate her from the ship, but he refuses. Lily begins hunting Vivian as Jamie, helped by Karen, races to save her. Lily is killed by her own chainsaw when she is distracted by Jamie bursting through the door. Henry reveals that the Sacramentum is not the only Velorum ship with this kind of operation. The Whales, angered by what has happened, pick up weapons to kill Jamie and Vivian, but are stopped by the arrival of the crew and are subsequently arrested by the Police. Karen flees the ship in the duck costume. Cormac and Rosie resume their relationship and Olly tells Jamie that he owes him a date. Jamie and Vivian resolve to take down Velorum, the company that owns the Sacramentum. Watching the boat from afar, Pippa is revealed to still be alive.

=== Series 2 (2024) ===
No. overall	No. in series	Title	Directed by	Written by	BBC Three air date
7	1	"Gay Miles Per Hour"	Chris Baugh	Ryan J. Brown	26 March 2024
Arriving at Exodum, a wellness festival in Slovenia, Velorum employee Ben finds a tent full of dead bodies. Hiding amongst them, he sees the staff murder another boy using a corrosive balm. Elsewhere, Jamie, Vivian, and Lauren work to expose Velorum to little effect, disillusioning Vivian, who notes that the company have used their influence to silence the other workers on the Sacramentum. When Brian, a drag queen from the ship, is found dead, Jamie is spurred into action, and he and Lauren attend a party hosted by the Sacramentum entertainment team to warn them that they aren't safe. They also run into Olly, who left Jamie because he wouldn't give up his crusade against Velorum. Two figures wearing duck masks murder the entertainment team, leaving Sophia as the only survivor, and she flees with Jamie, Lauren, and Olly. Having narrowly survived an attack, Cormac and Rosie meet up with Vivian and tell her they are all being hunted. They meet up with the others at the hospital, where Beaker unsuccessfully attempts to kill Sophia again. Receiving word from Ben, the group agree to go to Exodum to get undeniable evidence against Velorum, using fake identities gained from The Baby. Olly refuses to go with them and says a tearful goodbye to Jamie. When they arrive, Jamie sees Pippa among the staff.
8	2	"Did You Miss Me?"	Chris Baugh	Ryan J. Brown	27 March 2024
In the flashback, Jamie hosts a memorial for Pippa at a local football grounds. In the present, he and Pippa reunite, and she reveals that she faked her own death and has gone undercover as "Claire" to bring Velorum down from the inside. She states that Devon Deveraux, leader of Exodum, aims to use its success to take over ownership Velorum from her father, Owen. Ben shows the group an island and theorizes that this is where Exodum's victims are being held. Jamie is ambushed by Maggie and Billy, Pippa's co-conspirators, who warn him to stay out of their way, and drug him to prevent him from interfering in their plans, though he is helped back to Vivian by an unseen figure. Beaker and his accomplice torture The Baby to find out the group's location. When some of Exodum's contractors express uncertainty about the morals of the project, Devon and her assistant Jean murder them. After being confronted, Pippa reveals that she is part of O, a network of people who have lost people to Velorum founded by Maggie, who lost her daughter on one of their cruise ships. Pippa reveals that she sent O after Jamie to scare him off, and because she was afraid of his reaction to her working with Karen.
9	3	"Hold the Line"	Chris Baugh	Ryan J. Brown	2 April 2024
In the flashback, Karen visits Zoe, Sam's girlfriend and tells her the truth about his murder, feeling guilty for her complicity. She is demoted to Velorum customer care and later finds out that Zoe has been killed in a "hit-and-run". Maggie stops her from attempting suicide and recruits her to O. In the present, she tries to convince the group that she is on their side, explaining that O plan to kidnap Owen Deveraux and force him to publicly confess Velorum's crimes. Exodum opens to guests, and Devon visits the captives she has on the island. Ben and Lauren steal a map of Exodum, allowing Jamie, Cormac, Rosie, and Sophia to find a small chapel in the woods. Jamie infiltrates the chapel and discovers Joseph, one of the psychiatrists, experimenting on a person without a face. The group is rescued by Karen, who reveals she also saved Jamie in the woods a day prior, and warns him not to trust Maggie. Pippa defects from O after finding out that Maggie drugged Jamie, something she had denied in an earlier conversation. Maggie tells Karen she's discovered her secret, and Karen murders her. With Jamie and Vivian choosing to stay, the others leave Exodum, and are followed by Beaker.
10	4	"Disposable"	Louis Paxton	Ryan J. Brown	3 April 2024
In the flashback, Beaker meets with Tom Deveraux who tasks him with hunting down the Sacramentum survivors. In the present, Beaker stabs Ben, but the group are rescued by Drago, a local farmer. Karen takes control of O and instructs Jamie, Pippa, Billy, and Vivian with infiltrating the Deveraux house to get access to the CCTV so it can be manipulated during their kidnapping attempt. Karen distracts the security guard enabling them to successfully complete their mission. Pippa and Vivian overhear Devon and Jean discussing Owen's impending arrival. Jamie befriends Joseph, theorizing knows where the prisoners are, and meets him at the chapel. Joseph explains that he prepares prisoners for the "Changemaker package", before they are sent to the island and offers to help Jamie, explaining that he is Devon's therapist and he wants out after she disclosed some of the things Velorum have been doing during their sessions. Devon then arrives at the chapel and forces Joseph sleep with her while Jamie hides nearby. Vivian finds Maggie's necklace, revealing to Pippa that Karen did something to her. Ben later dies from his injuries, and Sophia finds out that Drago is working with Velorum. Beaker and his accomplice arrive and kill Drago. Sophia sacrifices herself to allow the others time to escape, and Beaker later reveals that he has Olly captive in the boot of his car as he continues his pursuit.
11	5	"Gaylords of the Galaxy"	Louis Paxton	Ryan J. Brown	9 April 2024
In the flashback, Vivian struggles to move on from the events on the Sacramentum. In the present, Karen shows Maggie's body to Pippa and Vivian, and tells them she wants to blow up the Deveraux house, revealing that she has installed a bomb in the boiler but that Maggie hid the detonator before she died. Cormac, Rosie, and Lauren flee the farm through underground tunnels, but Beaker's accomplice finds them and stabs Cormac with a pair of scissors. Devon expresses her frustrations about her father to Joseph. He reveals to Jamie that he has been recording her sessions and has years worth of evidence against them, begging Jamie to help his escape in exchange, and leading him to an underground tunnel network where he reunites with Lauren and Rosie. Owen and Tom arrive at Exodum. Vivian and Pippa discuss their experiences on the Sacramentum and find the detonator. Against Jamie's wishes, the rest of the group agree to Karen's plan to blow up the house. Beaker takes Olly to Exodum and captures Pippa, catching the attention of the Deveraux's. Owen chastises his children for making a mess of the Sacramentum situation, and has Olly and Pippa, as well as Cormac, who is revealed to still be alive, imprisoned in the basement. Joseph betrays Jamie and locks him up with the others. Outside the house, Karen, Billy, Vivian, Rosie, and Lauren activate the 15-minute timer on the bomb.
12	6	"You Can Let Go Now"	Louis Paxton	Ryan J. Brown	10 April 2024
In a flashback, Joseph and Devon survey their work on the island and anticipate the opening of Exodum. In the present, Jamie reconnects with Olly in the basement, and reveals that there is a bomb in the house. Joseph then has Jamie, Pippa, and Olly taken to the island. Upstairs, Owen chastises this children for their failures and tells Devon he wants Exodum to be shut down immediately before abandoning them. Billy reveals to Karen's group that the others are inside the house, so they storm the house and force Jean to release Cormac and the other prisoners while Karen confronts Beaker. She is unable to convince him to betray the Deveraux family and kills him before fleeing the house before it is destroyed. On the island, Joseph explains that the "Changemaker" package allows wealthy guest to work out their trauma on the prisoners, who are physically similar to them and wear masks to obscure their identities. He forces Jamie to choose between saving Olly or Pippa, but is distracted long enough for Vivian to arrive with Devon held hostage. Despite this, Joseph shoots Olly before the rest of the group apprehend him. Devon escapes and Olly dies from his injuries. Tom rescues Devon, and the siblings resolve to destroy the group to get back in Owen's good graces. A grief-stricken Jamie kills Joseph and abandons the others to go with Karen in pursuit of the Deveraux family.

== Critical reception ==
On the review aggregator website Rotten Tomatoes, the first season of Wreck holds a 69% approval rating, based on 13 critic reviews, with an average rating of 6.4/10. Metacritic gave a score of 57 out of 100 based on 6 critics, indicating "mixed or average reviews".

Both Attitude and Gay Times featured Wreck on their list of Top LGBT TV Shows of 2022.

In a four-star review, Benji Wilson of The Telegraph praised the premise and Chris Baugh's directing and described the series as being like a punk band at their first gig stating, "Wreck’s energy is infectious. Everyone on the ship is a suspect and no-one can get off. If that’s just Death on the Nile with ADHD, fine: I still want to know whodunit. And why they’re wearing a duck mask." Similarly, Neil Baker from Cinerama lauded BBC Three for commissioning the show, and referred to Wreck's killer duck as a "slasher icon". He called Brown's screenplay "as sharp as the knife our devilish duck wields", noting his ability to reference classic horror properties such as Scream, I Know What You Did Last Summer and Friday the 13th while still allowing Wreck to feel "fresh and different to anything else we have seen", and praised the series' humour, pacing, cinematography and queer representation. The show also received four-star reviews from Heat, which declared it a "stylish" and "fresh, vibrant, chilling horror treat", and TVTimes, who noted that the show "delivers jump-scares and witty one-liners with equal aplomb". In their round-up of new shows, NME referred to Wreck as a "comic-horror delight" and a "mischievous slasher in the vein of Scream".

In a wider article praising the series' queer and Asian representation, Alistair James of Attitude stated "the inclusion of LGBTQ characters doesn’t feel tokenistic or as if it’s been done to check a box. Therefore it’s more rewarding to watch as an audience. It feels sincere and heartfelt."

In a review for Autostraddle, Editor Kayla Kumari Upadhyaya praised the central relationship in the show stating, “It’s a series that surprised me and not in the expected avenues of plot twists but rather in its humor and its characters and relationship dynamics. Vivian and Jamie make for one of the best queer friendships I’ve seen on television in a while”.

In a mixed three-star review, Rachel Sigee of iNews praised the "refreshing" queer representation but criticised the show's merging of comedy and horror, stating that "with its original premise, game approach to genre-bending and admirable sense of silliness, Wreck certainly stands out, if not always for the right reasons."

Among more negative reviews from critics, the series received two stars from The Times, The Evening Standard and the Daily Mail, who said "there’s not a great deal to recommend this barking mad drama, which is a cross between a high-school comedy movie and a slasher flick with the killer being Orville the Duck," and described it as “more convoluted with each episode, taking viewers from one daft plot to another like a marble in a pinball machine” and “This camp horror thriller is a bit confused about its identity." Brown hit back at the negative reviews, stating on his Twitter, "Nearly all of the “critics” only watched the first episode and have no idea what the show is about."

The second season received positive reviews, with Alastair James of Attitude declaring it "bigger, badder, bloodier, and funnier than before", praising the increased stakes and scope of the series and the greater emphasis on the slasher and thriller elements alongside the comedy. He lauded Brown's writing and the continued depiction of queer characters whose identity is not the sole focus of their storyline, and highlighted the performances of the main cast, particularly Kennedy, Graham, and Ocego, as well as new cast members Walsh and Buttery. James summarised that "overall Wreck series two is a step up from series one, which was pretty good to begin with. Brown has stated in the past he had a three-series plan for Wreck from the out-set. After a gripping second series that seems to perfectly cue up a third, we certainly feel like we need another to bring this story to a truly satisfying conclusion".
