= Home from Home (2016 TV series) =

British television series

- Genre: Sitcom
- Written by: Simon Crowther; Chris Fewtrell
- Directed by: Paul Murphy
- Starring: Johnny Vegas; Emilia Fox; Adam James; Niky Wardley
- Country of origin: United Kingdom
- Original language: English
- No. of series: 1
- No. of episodes: 7

Production
- Producer: Rebecca Papworth

Original release
- Network: BBC One; BBC Two
- Release: 16 August 2016 – 25 May 2018

Home from Home is a BBC sitcom set in the Lake District, England. The Hackett family buy a wooden lodge on a park site and immediately father Neil is trying to outdo the better off neighbours. The sitcom began as a pilot episode, part of the BBC Two's New on Two series featuring potential sitcom ideas. A full series was commissioned in December 2016, and debuted on BBC One in April 2018.

== Synopsis ==
Home from Home revolves around the class divide between the Hackett family and the Dillons. The Hacketts, after saving for years to be able to afford a lodge holiday home in the Lake District, find that other second home owners are not quite on the same level as them. Their most immediate neighbours, the Dillons, have the most upmarket lodge on the site, having downgraded from their villa in Ibiza. A class-war emerges between the Dillons and the Hacketts, particularly between Penny and Neil: she describes the family as "The Stoke Massive". Robert and Fiona, on the other hand, get on well and the Hackett's eldest son is clearly in love with the Dillons' adopted daughter, Petra.

== Cast ==
- Johnny Vegas as Neil Hackett
- Emilia Fox as Penny Dillon
- Adam James as Robert Dillon
- Niky Wardley as Fiona Hackett (after pilot)
- Oscar Kennedy as Garth Hackett
- Harvey Chaisty as Little Neil Hackett
- Olive Gray as Petra Dillon
- Pearce Quigley as Thistlewaite
- Susan Calman as Lorraine Sykes
- Paul Barber as Fieldhouse
- Elaine Paige as Mercy Hackett
- Joanna Page as Fiona Hackett (pilot only)

== Production ==
The pilot and six-part series were filmed at the Skiddaw View Holiday Park, Ullswater and Pooley Bridge.

The pilot, which was broadcast in 2016, originally featured Joanna Page as Fiona Hackett. Page did not return for the full series and was replaced by Niky Wardley.

== Episodes ==
=== Pilot (2016) ===
Title	Directed by	Written by	Original release date
"Pilot"	Nick Wood	Simon Crowther & Chris Fewtrell	16 August 2016
Neil Hackett and his wife, Fiona (Vegas and Page) have finally achieved their dream of owning a lodge on a site in the Lake District. When they arrive, Neil feels usurped by their neighbours who make everything seem so effortless. Neil also makes a fool of himself over a "getting to know each other barbecue".

=== Series 1 (2018) ===
No.	Title	Directed by	Written by	Original release date
1	"The BLT"	Paul Murphy	Simon Crowther & Chris Fewtrell	20 April 2018
Neil Hackett believes he has been fired and so goes off the deep end. When the park manager, Thistlewaite, attempts to erect a wi-fi mast outside their home, Neil really does not like it and takes decisive action.
2	"Into Thin Air"	Paul Murphy	Simon Crowther & Chris Fewtrell	27 April 2018
Neil decides the family should go up Helvellyn; all 3,000 feet (910 m) of it. The Dillons go along too, though ostensibly only so dad Robert can keep a watchful eye on everyone as he is the only one with any mountaineering experience. Penny and Neil go off together and have to be rescued by Robert in a helicopter. Neil's mum, Mercy Hackett, arrives on site and gets cosy with Fieldhouse.
3	"The Party"	Paul Murphy	Simon Crowther & Chris Fewtrell	4 May 2018
Upset by Robert's popularity, Neil decides to hold a party which sees him as the cocktail waiter only for the results to be catastrophic. Robert, who used to be the head barman at the Raffles Hotel in Singapore, proves to be adept at it though and an embarrassed Neil slouches off. In a quiet conversation with Penny, she reveals to Neil that her husband is magnificent at everything, apart from dancing, which gives Neil an idea...
4	"Pitter Patter"	Paul Murphy	Simon Crowther & Chris Fewtrell	11 May 2018
Neil books a table at a snazzy restaurant to celebrate his and Fiona's wedding anniversary; unfortunately Fiona is ill and when they finally manage to get to the restaurant, their table has been given away to Robert and Penny. Elsewhere, Garth overhears Petra splitting up with her boyfriend, Sebastian, and so he thinks that now is his time to shine. Neil's mum, Mercy, tries to hide her blossoming relationship with Fieldhouse.
5	"The Chrysler Building"	Paul Murphy	Simon Crowther & Chris Fewtrell	18 May 2018
Little Neil announces that he has homework to hand in on Monday; a research project into a world-famous building and to produce a scale model too. When Robert comes over, he helps out as he has his architectural building materials (for model-making) in his car. Neil is jealous and tries building the Empire State Building out of cereal packets, whilst Robert and Little Neil create a perfect scaled replica of the Chrysler Building. Elsewhere, Petra is without her study notes and Garth witnesses them getting mis-delivered to a neighbour's lodge, so he uses an open window to get into the neighbour's lodge. Unfortunately, whilst in the process of recovering the mis-delivered item, the occupants return home and Garth has to hide in the wardrobe.
6	"Mandy Rowlands"	Paul Murphy	Simon Crowther & Chris Fewtrell	25 May 2018
Garth observes the Dillon's arriving at the park without Petra, she has stayed home because her ex, Sebastian, has come back on the scene. Robert realises that there is a widening gulf between him and Penny, so they make the decision to sell up. A family come to view the lodge and Neil introduces himself, but the inverted snob in him comes out when the prospective buyer reveals he runs a garage on the A6, which he likens to a service station. Neil's revelation that his one true love when he was 12-years old was Mandy Rowlands, upsets Fiona. Neil organises a hot air balloon trip for Penny and Robert, but a mix-up means Fiona and Neil have to go too. Whilst airborne on the balloon trip, they all witness Fieldhouse on bended knee proposing to Mercy, but in reality he was just trying to tie a shoelace. Petra returns and makes-up with Garth and asks him to help her tear down the for sale signs as they [the Dillons] are going nowhere.

== Critical reception ==
Gabriel Tate, writing in The Telegraph, gave the sitcom three stars out of five and whilst acknowledging that the sitcom had many traits in common with other "over the garden-fence sitcoms" it was "fundamentally good-natured, resolutely unambitious and a lively addition to a crowded field”.
