= Alice Nokes =

English actress

- Born: Alice Holly Nokes; Sutton, South London, England
- Occupation: Actress
- Years active: 2007–present

Alice Holly Nokes is an English actress and model. She is known for her roles in the BBC One soap opera EastEnders (2016), the Starz series The Spanish Princess (2020), and the BBC Three series Wreck (2022–2024).

== Early life ==
Nokes grew up in Wallington, Greater London. She attended Sylvia Young Theatre School and the BRIT School.

== Career ==
As a child, Nokes appeared in the second series of the game show Are You Smarter than a 10 Year Old? on Sky 1. In 2016, Nokes made her acting television debut at the age of 18. when she joined the cast of the BBC One soap opera EastEnders as Courtney Mitchell, daughter of Grant and Tiffany Mitchell. The character had previously been played by Megan Jossa as a child. She subsequently appeared in the BBC One television film Grandpa's Great Escape, series 4 of the CBBC sitcom Millie Inbetween, and the eighth and final season of the HBO fantasy series Game of Thrones.

Nokes portrayed Anne Boleyn in the second half of the Starz historical drama The Spanish Princess, which aired in 2020. She made guest appearances in the Apple TV+ series Ted Lasso, and the detective series Dalgiesh on Channel 5 and Father Brown on BBC One. Nokes had a main role as Sophia in the 2022 BBC Three comedy horror series Wreck She is signed with Select Model Management.

== Filmography ==
| Year | Title | Role | Notes |
|---|---|---|---|
| 2007 | The German Lullaby | Katrina | Short film |
| 2008 | Are You Smarter than a 10 Year Old? | Contestant | Series 2 |
| 2016 | EastEnders | Courtney Mitchell | 13 episodes |
| 2016 | Suspicion | Kim Nees | Episode: "A Sister's Suspicion" |
| 2017 | Casualty | Toni Dunn | Episode: "Man Up" |
| 2018 | Grandpa's Great Escape | Shelley | Television film |
| 2018 | Millie Inbetween | Siobhan | 2 episodes |
| 2019 | Game of Thrones | Willa | Episode: "The Last of the Starks" |
| 2019 | The Killer Beside Me | Theresa | Episode: "Roadside Murder" |
| 2020 | Ted Lasso | Rosie | Episode: "Tan Lines" |
| 2020 | The Spanish Princess | Anne Boleyn | 6 episodes |
| 2021 | Dalgliesh | Julia Pardoe | 2 episodes |
| 2022 | Father Brown | Kate Goodall | Episode: "The Wayward Girls" |
| 2022–2024 | Wreck | Sophia Leigh | Main role |
