= Scott Andrews (rugby union, born 1994) =

- Born: Scott Andrews; 30 June 1994 (age 32) Cardiff
- Height: 196 cm (6 ft 5 in)
- Weight: 123 kg (19 st 5 lb)

Rugby union career
Senior career
Years	Team	Apps	(Points)
2014-2018	Dragons	13	(0)
- Correct as of 25 January 2018
International career
Years	Team	Apps	(Points)
	Wales U20	9	(0)

Scott Andrews (born 30 June 1994) is a Welsh rugby union player who plays for as a lock forward having previously played for Bedwas RFC, Cross Keys RFC and Newport RFC. He made his debut for the Dragons on 26 January 2016 versus Leinster. Scott also had a stint with English Championship side Ealing Trailfinders on a loan from the Dragons.

== International ==
Andrews is a Wales under-20 international and featured in the 2014 IRB Junior World Championship.
