= Ali Hardiman =

Irish actress

- Born: Ireland
- Education: Gaiety School of Acting
- Alma mater: Gaiety School of Acting
- Occupation: Actress
- Years active: 2016–present
- Parents: Ronan Hardiman (father); Helen Brickley (mother)

Alice Brickley Hardiman is an Irish actress. She is known for her roles in the BBC series Wreck and the Hallmark movie Christmas at Castle Hart.

== Early life and education ==
Hardiman was born in Dublin. She studied Modern Languages at University College Dublin and then switched to the Gaiety Theatre.

== Career ==
Hardiman was listed as one of The Sunday Times "30 under 30 artists set for greater glory" in 2020. She won the 2022 "Luicille Ball Award for Best Female Actor" at the Dublin International Comedy Film Festival. She was one of the participants in the Creative Team of The 24 Hour Plays in aid of Dublin Youth Theatre.

She has written several plays including Disconnected, Electric and Death of Pablo. She performed Electric at the Edinburgh Fringe in 2019 as part of a UK and Ireland tour. She was Chairperson of the Judging Panel of the 2022 Dublin Fringe Festival. She was part of the small cast of "Inside the GPO" play by Colin Murphy as part of the 1916 commemorations.

Hardiman's play Electric is based on the Electric Picnic festival and contrasts the friendship and fate of two girls from different sides of Dublin City who meet at the festival.

Hardman's recent television and film credits include Wrecked, Christmas at Castle Hart, Season 2 of Finding Joy, The South Westerlies, Blasts from the Past and The Bright Side.

== Filmography ==
Year	Title	Role	Notes
2022	Wreck	Bethany May Denbrough	TV series
2021	Magic	Lauren	Short Film
2021	Christmas at Castle Hart	Margot Bennett	Hallmark Channel Film
2020	First Words	Sarah	Short Film
2020	The Bright Side	Liz McLaughlin	
2020	Blasts from the Past	Grace O'Malley	TV series
2020	Finding Joy	Therapist Doula	TV series
2020	The South Westerlies	Maeve	TV series
2019	Something Doesn't Feel Right	Stacey	Short Film
2019	Dub Daze	Sinead	
2018	Bernard Dunne's Mythical Heroes	Professor X	TV series
2018	Breastfriends	Becca	Short Film
2018	Metal Heart	Miranda	
2017	A different Kind of Day	Ali	Short Film
2017	Leave to Remain	Colleague	Short Film

== Stage ==
Year	Title	Role	Notes
2022	Death of Pablo	Playwright/Actor	Civic Theatre
2019	Electric	Playwright/Actor	Smock Alley Theatre and UK/Ireland Tour
2018/2019	Disconnected	Playwright/Actor	Smock Alley Theatre and New Theatre
2016	Inside the GPO	Actor	GPO, Dublin
