= School's Out Forever (film) =

2021 British horror-comedy film

School's Out Forever is a 2021 British horror-comedy film based on the novel School's Out by Scott K. Andrews. It was written and directed by Oliver Milburn and starred Oscar Kennedy, Anthony Head, Alex Macqueen and Samantha Bond. It was released on 15 February 2021.

== Synopsis ==
The film revolves around a group of teachers and students of a private boys' school sheltering from a global pandemic.

== Reception ==
On the review aggregator website Rotten Tomatoes, the film has an approval rating of 73%, based on 15 reviews, with an average rating of 5/10.
