= Nigel Slater =

English food writer and broadcaster (born 1956)

Nigel Slater OBE
- Born: 9 April 1956 (age 70); Wolverhampton, England
- Occupations: Food writer; journalist; author; TV broadcaster

Nigel Slater OBE (born 9 April 1956) is an English food writer, journalist and broadcaster. He has written a column for The Observer Magazine for more than a decade and is the principal writer for the Observer Food Monthly supplement. Prior to this, Slater was a food writer for Marie Claire magazine for five years.

== Early life ==
Food is, for me, for everybody, a very sexual thing and I think I realised that quite early on. I still cannot exaggerate how just putting a meal in front of somebody is really more of a buzz for me than anything. And I mean anything. Maybe that goes back to trying to please my dad, I don't know. It's like parenting in a way I suppose.

— Nigel Slater, The Guardian

Nigel Slater was born on 9 April 1956, in Wolverhampton, then in Staffordshire. He was the younger of two sons born to factory owner Cyril "Tony" Slater and housewife Kathleen Slater (née Galleymore). This was his father's second marriage. His mother died of asthma in 1965. In 1971, his father remarried to Dorothy Perrens, dying in 1973.

Slater attended Woodfield Avenue School in Penn, Staffordshire. He moved to Worcestershire as a teenager and attended The Chantry School in Martley, where he enjoyed writing essays and was one of only two boys to take cookery as an O-Level subject.

Slater stated in his autobiography that he used food to compete with his stepmother for his father's attention. Their biggest battle was over lemon meringue pie – his father's favourite. She refused to divulge her recipe, so Slater resorted to subterfuge to turn out his own version. "I'd count the egg-shells in the bin, to see how many eggs she'd used and write them down. I'd come in at different times, when I knew she was making it. I'd just catch her when she was doing some meringue, building up that recipe slowly over a matter of months, if not years."

Slater gained an OND in catering at Worcester Technical College in 1976, and worked in restaurants and hotels across the UK before becoming a food writer for Marie Claire magazine in 1988. He became known for uncomplicated, comfort food recipes which he presented in early books such as The 30-Minute Cook (1994) and Real Cooking, as well as his memoir-like columns for The Observer which he began in 1993.

== Television and radio ==
In 1998, Slater hosted the Channel 4 series Nigel Slater's Real Food Show. He returned to TV in 2006 to host the chat/food show A Taste of My Life for BBC One and BBC Two. In 2009, he presented the six-part series Simple Suppers on BBC One, and a second series the following year.

He appeared as a guest castaway on BBC Radio 4's Desert Island Discs in June 2005.

In November 2013, he appeared alongside farmer Adam Henson on BBC's 'Nigel and Adam's Farm Kitchen', which was set on a working farm in the Cotswolds and covered various aspects of food production and preparation.

== Writing ==
Slater's book, Eating for England: The Delights & Eccentricities of the British at Table (Fourth Estate), is devoted to British food and cookery. It was published in October 2007 and was described in The Sunday Times as "the sort of ragbag of choice culinary morsels that would pass the time nicely on a train journey". His book Tender is the story of his vegetable garden, how it came to be, and what grows in it. The book was published in two volumes; the first is on vegetables, which was released late in 2009 and the second is on fruit, which was released in 2010. Tender is described as a memoir, a study of fifty of our favourite vegetables, fruits and nuts and a collection of over five hundred recipes.

Slater became known to a wider audience with the publication of Toast: The Story of a Boy's Hunger (2003), a moving and award-winning autobiography focused on his love of food, his childhood, his family relationships (his mother died of asthma when he was nine) and his burgeoning homosexuality. Slater has called it "the most intimate memoir that any food person has ever written". Toast was published in Britain in October 2004 and became a best-seller after it was featured on the Richard & Judy Book Club.

As he told The Observer, "The last bit of the book is very foody. But that is how it was. Towards the end I finally get rid of these two people in my life I did not like [his father and stepmother, who had been the family's cleaning lady]—and to be honest I was really very jubilant—and thereafter all I wanted to do was cook."

== Adaptations ==
Slater's autobiographical work was adapted into the 2010 film Toast, starring Freddie Highmore as the 15-year-old Slater and Helena Bonham Carter as his stepmother. It has been broadcast on BBC One.

In 2018, The Lowry commissioned a stage adaptation of Toast written by Henry Filloux-Bennett and directed by Jonnie Riordan with Sam Newton as Nigel Slater. After a sell-out run at the Week 53 Festival, it was announced that it would transfer to the Traverse Theatre at Edinburgh Festival Fringe.

Both productions of the show received rave reviews with critics praising it for its charm and glowing nostalgia.

In 2018, it was announced that Toast would transfer to The Other Palace in London, premiering on 9 April 2019. In March 2019, it was announced that Giles Cooper would play the role of Nigel.

In April 2019, it was announced that the show would embark on a UK National Tour in the autumn.

== Personal life ==
Slater is gay. He has two older brothers, Adrian (born 1944) and John. Slater's parents adopted John, a neighbour's child, before Slater was born. He also has two stepsisters, from whom he is estranged.

In 2003, Slater published his autobiography Toast which is based upon his early life; the book spawned both a film and a play to which he has contributed and collaborated.

== Publications and broadcasting ==
=== Cookbooks ===
- The Marie Claire Cookbook, Hamlyn, (ISBN 0-7064-2573-1, 1992)
- Real Fast Food, Michael Joseph, (ISBN 0-7181-3577-6, 1992) or Penguin Books, (ISBN 0-14-046949-4, 1993)
- Real Fast Puddings, Michael Joseph, (ISBN 0-7181-3577-6, 1992) or Penguin Books, (ISBN 0-14-023283-4, 1994)
- The 30-Minute Cook, Michael Joseph, (ISBN 0-7181-3752-3, 1994)
- Real Good Food, Fourth Estate (ISBN, 1995)
- Real Cooking, Michael Joseph, (ISBN 0-7181-4090-7, 1997) or Penguin Books (ISBN 0-14-025277-0, 1999)
- Real Food, Fourth Estate, (ISBN 1-85702-971-2, 1998) or (ISBN 1-84115-144-0, 2000)
- Appetite, Random House of Canada, (ISBN 0-679-31212-9, 2000) or Fourth Estate (ISBN 1-84115-470-9, 2000)
- Thirst, Fourth Estate, (ISBN 1-84115-768-6, 2002)
- The Kitchen Diaries, Fourth Estate, (ISBN 0-00-719948-1, 2005) or Gotham Books, published by Penguin (USA), (ISBN 1-592-40234-8), October 2006
- Tender, Volume One, Fourth Estate, HarperCollins, (ISBN 978-0-00-724849-0) (2009)
- Tender, Volume Two, Fourth Estate, HarperCollins (2010)
- The Kitchen Diaries II, Fourth Estate (2012)
- eat: The Little Book of Fast Food, Fourth Estate (2013)
- A Year of Good Eating: The Kitchen Diaries III, Fourth Estate (ISBN 978-0-00-753680-1) (2015)
- The Christmas Chronicles, Fourth Estate (2017)
- Greenfeast: Spring, Summer, Fourth Estate, (ISBN 978-0008333355) (2019)
- Greenfeast: Autumn, Winter, Fourth Estate, (ISBN 978-0008213770) (2019)
- A Cook's Book, Fourth Estate, (ISBN 978-0008213763) (2021)

=== Autobiography ===
- Toast: The Story of a Boy's Hunger, Fourth Estate, (ISBN 1-84115-289-7, 2003) or HarperPerennial, (ISBN 0-7011-7287-8, 2004)
- Eating For England, Fourth Estate, (ISBN 0-00-719946-5, October 2007)
- A Thousand Feasts: Small Moments of Joy … A Memoir of Sorts, Fourth Estate, (ISBN 9780008670740, October 2024)

=== Broadcasting ===
- Nigel Slater's Real Food Show (1998) – host and presenter
- A Taste of My Life (2006-2008, 31 episodes) – host and presenter
- Nigel Slater's Simple Suppers (2009) – writer and presenter
- Nigel Slater's Simple Cooking (2011, 8 episodes) – writer and presenter
- Nigel Slater: Life is Sweets (2012, one-off documentary) – writer and presenter
- Nigel Slater's Dish of the Day (2012) – writer and presenter
- Nigel Slater's Great British Biscuit (2013, one-off documentary) – writer and presenter
- Nigel and Adam's Farm Kitchen (2013) – co-presenter
- Nigel Slater: Eating Together (2015, 4 episodes) – writer and presenter
- Nigel Slater's Middle East (2018, 3 episodes) - writer and presenter

== Honours and awards ==
- 1995: Glenfiddich Cookery Writer of the Year Award
- 1995: Glenfiddich Trophy
- 1995: Glendfiddich Award for Best Visual Work for The Observer
- 1996: Media Personality of the Year Award (Good Food Awards)
- 1999: Glenfiddich Award for Best Visual Work for Real Food
- 1999: Best Newspaper Cookery Journalist Award
- 2000: André Simon Award for Cookbook of the Year for Appetite
- 2004: André Simon Award for Toast
- 2004: Glenfiddich Food Book of the Year forToast
- 2004: British Biography of the Year Award for Toast
- 2004: Observer Food Monthly Book of the Year Award for Toast
- 2004: WH Smith People's Choice Award for Toast
- 2006: British Book Award for The Kitchen Diaries
- 2007: Specialist Writer of the Year, PPA Awards
- 2009: Honorary DLitt from the University of Wolverhampton
- 2009: BBC Food Personality of the Year
- 2018: Fortnum and Mason's Food Book award for The Christmas Chronicles: Notes, stories & 100 essential recipes for midwinter
- 2020: Appointed OBE in the New Year Honours for services to cookery and literature
