= Ryan J. Brown =

English screenwriter

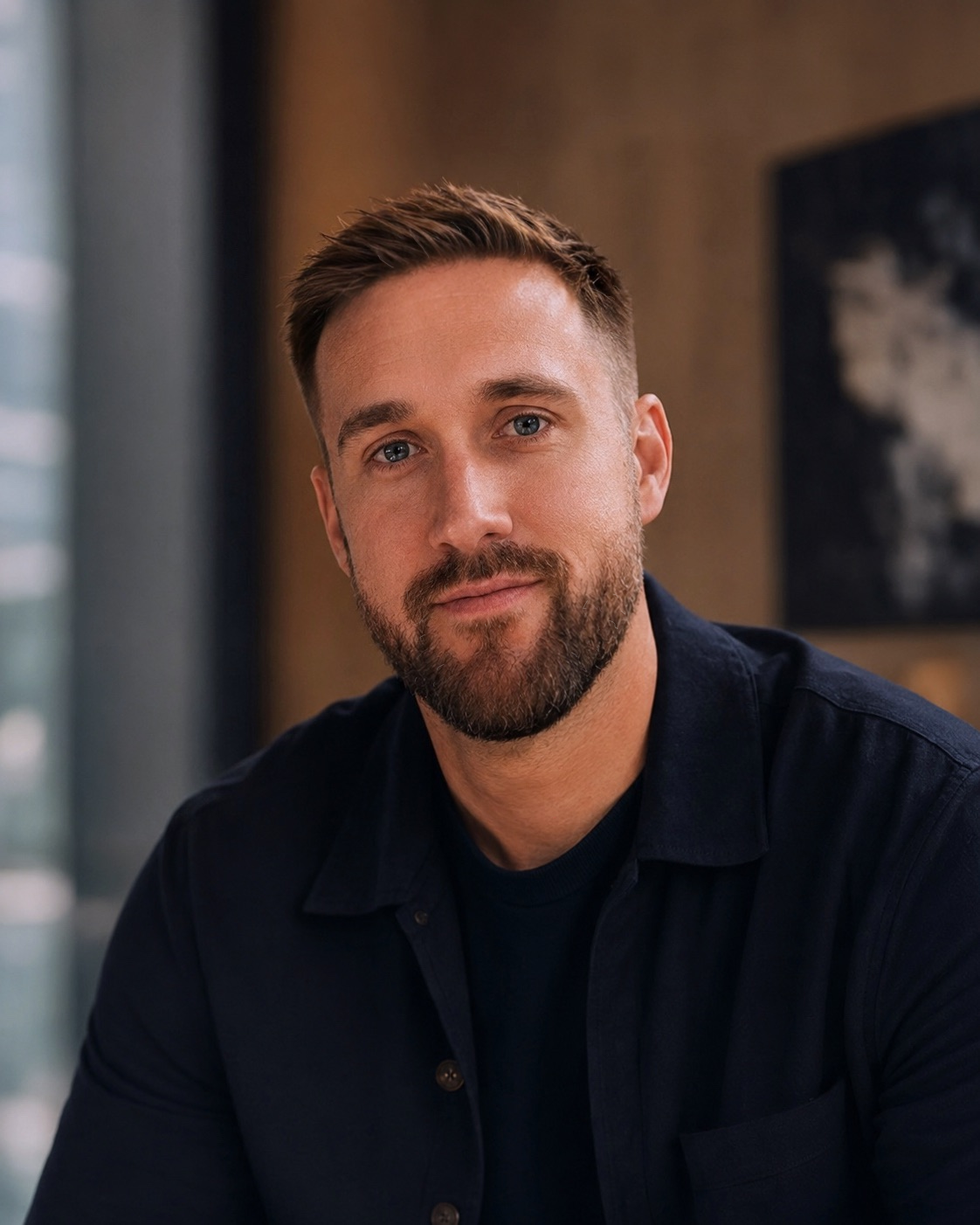
- Brown (c.2026)
- Born: Ryan James Brown; 29 August 1991 (age 35); Scunthorpe, Lincolnshire, U.K.
- Occupations: Screenwriter, Executive Producer
- Awards: BAFTA New Writing Prize TV Drama - 2016; ScreenDaily Brit List - 2017/2019; Attitude Magazine LGBT Trailblazer - 2023

Ryan J. Brown (born 29 August 1991) is an English screenwriter, born in Scunthorpe, Lincolnshire, United Kingdom. Brown is the writer and creator of BBC comedy-horror series Wreck.

== Education and career ==
Brown studied at Goldsmiths and Mountview Academy of Theatre Arts, both in London.

In 2016, he won the BAFTA New Writing Prize for TV Drama for his LGBT crime drama We Are Your Children, which was selected for The Brit List TV 2018, an annual selection of the best unproduced screenplays as voted for by the industry. In 2019, Brown was again featured highly on The Brit List for the second time with his Big Talk Productions project Only Child.

In 2017, Brown was featured in Gay Times as an "LGBT Emerging Artist to watch".

In March 2021, the BBC announced they were to make Brown's six-part comedy-horror series Wreck, from Fremantle Media’s Euston Films. The series is set aboard a cruise ship and follows 19-year-old new recruit Jamie as he joins the crew in search of his missing sister. The series was broadcast on BBC Three and BBC iPlayer in 2022. The show was received favourably with Attitude, Gay Times and The Queer Review featuring the series on their lists of Top LGBT TV Shows of 2022.

Wreck was renewed for a second series in October 2022, set for a 2023 broadcast.

In 2023, Brown was recognized as one of Attitude magazine's LGBTQ+ trailblazers in their annual "Attitude 101" list, which honors influential LGBTQ+ individuals across various fields.

== Filmography ==
=== Television ===
Year	Title	Credit	Channel
2022	The Bastard Son & The Devil Himself	Writer	Netflix
2022-2024	Wreck	Written and created by	BBC Three
