= Scott K. Andrews =

English author of science fiction

Scott Keegan Andrews
- Born: 5 November 1971 (age 54); Wolverhampton, England
- Writing career
- Genre: Science fiction

Scott Keegan Andrews (born 5 November 1971) is an English author of science fiction. His School's Out trilogy was published by Abaddon, and his Timebomb trilogy was published by Hodder and Stoughton. His first novel was filmed as School's Out Forever.

He is the son of the singer and songwriter Harvey Andrews.

== Bibliography ==
=== The School's Out Trilogy ===
- School's Out (2007)
- Operation Motherland (2009)
- Children's Crusade (2010)
- School's Out Forever - Omnibus of trilogy (2012)

=== The Timebomb trilogy ===
- Timebomb (October 2014)
- Timebomb: Second Lives (May 2016)
- Timebomb: The New World (July 2017)

=== Short fiction ===
- The Anchorite's Echo in Doctor Who Short Trips: The History of Christmas, (2005; edited by Simon Guerrier)
- The Man Who Would Not Be King (2009) (Afterblight Chronicles)
- A Private Viewing in Pandemonium: Tales of the Apocalypse, (2011; edited by Anne C. Perry & Jared Shurin)
- Sniper Elite V2 - Target Hitler (2012; novella, Rebellion)
- Grit in A Town Called Pandemonium, (2012; edited by Anne C. Perry & Jared Shurin)
- Sniper Elite - Water Line (2022; novella, Rebellion)

=== Non-fiction ===
- Troubled Waters: An Unauthorised and Unofficial Guide to "Dawson's Creek" (2001)
- Uncharted Territory: The Unofficial And Unauthorised Guide to Farscape (2002)

=== Computer Games ===
- Sniper Elite V2 (2012)
- Sniper Elite 5 (2022)

== Discography ==
=== Stargate audio drama ===
- Stargate Atlantis: Impressions (2009)

=== Highlander audio drama ===
- Highlander: The Four Horsemen 1: Brothers (2011)
- Highlander: The Four Horsemen 2: All The King's Horses (2011)
- Highlander: The Four Horsemen 3: The Pain Eater (2011)
