= Behind Her Eyes =

Behind Her Eyes may refer to:

- Behind Her Eyes (novel), a 2017 novel by Sarah Pinborough
- Behind Her Eyes (TV series), a 2021 British web television drama based on the novel
