= Flora and Son (soundtrack) =

Flora and Son (Soundtrack from the Apple Original Film)

Soundtrack album by John Carney and Gary Clark
- Released: September 15, 2023
- Genres: Electro-pop; rap; electronic dance music; acoustic
- Length: 39:50
- Label: Lakeshore
- Producers: John Carney; Gary Clark

Singles from Flora and Son (Soundtrack from the Apple Original Film)
- 1. "High Life" Released: August 23, 2023; 2. "Meet in the Middle" Released: September 11, 2023

Flora and Son (Soundtrack from the Apple Original Film) is the soundtrack to the 2023 film written and directed by John Carney, that stars Eve Hewson, Jack Reynor, Orén Kinlan, and Joseph Gordon-Levitt. Besides writing and directing, Carney also co-composed and co-wrote lyrics to the original songs with Gary Clark, the latter composed the score and featured vocal performances of the lead actors themselves. The album further featured Tom Waits' "I Hope That I Don't Fall in Love with You" and Hoagy Carmichael's "I Get Along Without You Very Well (Except Sometimes)".

The soundtrack was released by Lakeshore Records on September 15, 2023, a week before the film's limited theatrical release. It featured 18 tracks—which also included cues from Clark's score, and the singles: "High Life" and "Meet in the Middle" preceded the soundtrack. It received mixed critical reviews, with praise for incorporating various genres but compared inferiorly to the soundtracks of Carney's previous films.

== Development ==
Clark and Carney had jointly collaborated in several productions in film, stage and television. The cast further rehearsed on performing music and vocals, with Gordon-Levitt at the 2023 Sundance Film Festival stating it as a "dream come true" moment for him to play a musician. Hewson played guitar even before the film was under production and performed all the songs live on screen. In an interview to The Hollywood Reporter, she said that although she wanted to overcome the fear of "singing on stage" she never turned to her father Bono who is a musician, but "rather sing in front of the entire world".

== Release ==
"High Life", the first song from the album performed by Hewson and Kinlan, released on August 23, the same date as the soundtrack's announcement. It would be submitted at the Academy Award for Best Original Song consideration for the 96th Academy Awards in 2024. The second song "Meet in the Middle", with performances from Hewson and Gordon-Levitt released on September 11, followed by the full soundtrack, four days later.

== Track listing ==
No.	Title	Lyrics	Music	Artist(s)	Length
1.	"Guitar Repair"		Gary Clark		0:45
2.	"I Hope That I Don't Fall in Love with You"	Tom Waits	Clark	Joseph Gordon-Levitt	2:29
3.	"Abra Da Cabra"		Clark		2:40
4.	"I Get Along Without You Very Well (Except Sometimes)"	Hoagy Carmichael	Clark	Gordon-Levitt	0:57
5.	"Dublin07"	Carney	Clark; John Carney	Eve Hewson; Oren Kinlan	1:46
6.	"Juanita"	Carney	Clark; Carney	Hewson	1:12
7.	"Shopping Mall"		Clark		0:53
8.	"Welcome to L.A."	Hewson; Clark; Carney; Gordon-Levitt; Robert John Ardiff	Clark; Carney	Gordon-Levitt	1:33
9.	"I'll Be the One"	Clark; Carney	Clark; Carney	Adam Hunter	2:35
10.	"Crumlin to L.A."	Clark; Carney	Clark; Carney	Jack Reynor; Clark	4:38
11.	"Meet in the Middle"	Hewson; Clark; Carney; Gordon-Levitt; Ardiff	Clark; Carney	Gordon-Levitt; Hewson	3:07
12.	"Rooftop"		Clark		2:06
13.	"Court"		Clark		1:32
14.	"Montage"		Clark; Carney		2:52
15.	"Flora Watches Max"		Clark		1:02
16.	"High Life"	Hewson; Clark; Carney	Clark; Carney	Hewson; Kinlan	4:32
17.	"Talking to You"	Clark	Clark	Gordon-Levitt	2:23
18.	"The Best Day"	Clark; Carney	Clark; Carney	Hunter	2:48
Total length:					39:50

== Reception ==
Kyle Smith of The Wall Street Journal said that the songs are "exceptionally strong, ranging from rap to bouncy pop, and several of them are co-written by the actors, which may be why they feel so engagingly homemade and personal". Benjamin Lee of The Guardian said as often with Carney's previous films, the music "acts as a transformative force". Owen Gleiberman of Variety wrote that the songs "stake out a place somewhere on the spectrum between indie emo earnestness and Loggins and Messina nostalgia" and the performances are "just enchanting enough to carry the day".

Ross Bonaime of Collider wrote "The songs in Flora and Son have a delicate balance to walk: they have to sound good enough to stick with the audience, but it also has to sound like it is coming from amateurs. Yet Carney and Clark's music manages to pull off that specific mixture." Caryn James of The Hollywood Reporter wrote "The new songs are mostly ballads, some deliberately amateurish and others lovely" while praising the vocal performances as "pleasant, light and modest".

In a negative review, Steven Scaife of Slant Magazine said "the film can't even lean on its soundtrack to carry these segments. Its corny attempts at rap are unfortunate, while the usual singer-songwriter material is generic and forgettable." Wendy Ide of Screen International felt it as "rather uneven". Damon Wise of Deadline Hollywood wrote "the film doesn't really advance the formula much and could almost be Sing Street 2, hitting the same notes but with more disappointing songs, tapping into Carney's by now familiar belief in the redemptive properties of music".

Nicholas Barber of TheWrap wrote "even if the songs themselves, written by Carney and Gary Clark, don't reach James Blunt's level, let alone Hoagy Carmichael's. But "Flora and Son" feels more like a scrappy demo tape than a polished album." Ben Pearson of /Film wrote "Although the songs are pleasant in "Flora and Son," there's no song on its soundtrack that approaches the aching yearning of "Falling Slowly" from "Once" or the catchy "Drive It Like You Stole It" from "Sing Street." Monica Castillo of RogerEbert.com wrote "the soundtrack is more discordant this time. The majority of the compositions are either acoustic (traditional grounds for Carney) or a cross electro-pop rap dance music that don't quite work as well as, say, the soundtracks to "Once" or the '80s tribute "Sing Street.""
