= Behind Her Eyes (novel) =

2017 thriller novel by Sarah Pinborough

- Author: Sarah Pinborough
- Language: English
- Genre: Thriller
- Published: 23 January 2017
- Publisher: HarperCollins Publishers and Flatiron Books
- Publication place: United States
- Media type: Print (hardback and paperback); Audiobook; E-book
- Pages: 320 (hardcover)
- ISBN: 978-1250111173

Behind Her Eyes is a thriller novel by English author Sarah Pinborough, published on 23 January 2017 by HarperCollins Publishers and Flatiron Books. The novel was adapted into a Netflix television series of the same name.

== Summary ==
Louise Barnsley is a single mother who works in an unfulfilling role as a secretary. On a particular night, she engages in a conversation with David Martin, a man she met at a bar. When it is time for the two to depart, David gives Louise an unexpected kiss. Later, she realizes David is the new boss at her workplace. When Louise realizes the truth that David is married, he confesses to her that it was a mistake, though in spite of feeling guilty, he maintains his feelings for Louise. She is conflicted about the situation, which is only further complicated by her encounter with David's wife Adele, who, as a new resident in town, is interested in forming a friendly connection with Louise. Soon after, Louise is caught in the middle of a twisted circumstance that makes her question the sinister conspiracy behind their marital relationship.

== Reception ==
Alison Flood from The Guardian gave praise to the novel, stating that "Behind Her Eyes is a canny move from Pinborough" and that when the twists are "revealed, it is fantastically creepy, if not entirely unexpected." Nilan Singh of The Free Press Journal labeled Behind Her Eyes as a "compelling read as much for its well-woven plot and story; as for the complete control in its unravelling."

== TV adaptation ==
On 25 January 2019, it was announced that Netflix had given the production a series order for a first season. Steve Lightfoot is credited as the creator, executive producer and show runner of the limited series. In August 2019, it was confirmed that Simona Brown, Eve Hewson, Tom Bateman and Robert Aramayo would star in the limited series.
