= Disclosure Day (soundtrack) =

Disclosure Day (Original Motion Picture Soundtrack)

Film score by John Williams
- Released: June 12, 2026
- Recorded: September 11, 2025–February 20, 2026
- Studios: Sony Scoring Stage, Sony Pictures Studios, Culver City, California
- Genres: Film score; orchestral
- Length: 64:40
- Label: Back Lot Music
- Producer: John Williams

John Williams chronology
Indiana Jones and the Dial of Destiny (2023)	Disclosure Day (2026)

Disclosure Day (Original Motion Picture Soundtrack) is the film score composed by John Williams to the 2026 film Disclosure Day directed by Steven Spielberg starring Emily Blunt, Josh O'Connor, Colin Firth, Eve Hewson, and Colman Domingo. The film is Spielberg's thirtieth overall collaboration with Williams.

The score for Disclosure Day was recorded at the Sony Scoring Stage in Sony Pictures Studios, Culver City, California. Sessions were split into seven sessions during September 2025 and February 2026, which provided more time for Williams to compose it and record simultaneously, owing to his health conditions. Performed by the Hollywood Studio Symphony, Williams further orchestrated and conducted the score with his collaborators William Ross and Randy Kerber.

The score was released digitally through Back Lot Music on June 12, 2026, and in physical formats through Waxwork Records. It received positive reviews from critics.

== Background and production ==
Disclosure Day is Williams' thirtieth collaboration with Spielberg. Williams, owing to his health conditions, suggested other composers to Spielberg but the director persuaded him to compose the film to which he agreed. At the press notes, Spielberg noted the film's score to be the most restrained until the moments, where Williams holds back in a way that was subtle and beautiful and enriches the experience thereby accompanying the film slightly behind it, pushing the film forward.

Spielberg pointed to Close Encounters of the Third Kind and Indiana Jones as a benchmark and influence for Williams' symphonic and thematic style, where most of the score sets the mood in an undeniably sophisticated manner, and the main theme had influences of Americana owing to the film's setting. While some eerie string passages and dissonant music highlight the darker moments, regarding the events happening on screen.

== Writing and recording ==
Williams began writing the score at last summer. Unlike most recording sessions, which would take place for a week or two, the recording sessions for the score had been split into seven sessions owing to Williams' health conditions that led Spielberg to give him the necessary time to conceive and record all of the music.

The first recording session held on September 11, 2025, at the newly renamed John Williams Music Building in Sony Pictures Studios. Recording sessions continued through the fall and winter, with two sessions in October, two in December, one session in January 2026 and the final session which was conducted on February 20. The split sessions allowed Williams to have ample time to compose the music, as the score developed during the process.

Most of the recording sessions were held at closed doors with only a few members being present in the sessions. Spielberg and music editor Ramiro Belgardt supervised the recording through a small screen online in the editing room which was a few feet away from the sound stage, to refrain musicians and studio technicians from watching the shot and edited footage. Over the course of seven sessions, Williams recorded around 140 minutes of music, while the final edit only consisted of 82 minutes of the score.

== Orchestra and choir ==
An orchestra of 96 players were assembled during the September session. It consisted of a traditional symphonic ensemble, although a darker cue demanded four bassoons, the keyboards section involved piano, celeste and synthesizers, and two harps were present. Although the credits of orchestration and conducting were shared by Williams, along with William Ross and Randy Kerber, sources close to the composer revealed that Williams orchestrated and conducted most of the score, owing to his attention to orchestral detail. Ross and Kerber occasionally adapted most of Williams' material to accommodate revisions in the film.

On December 19, a 30-member female choir was brought forward to record the score with the orchestra. The choir was divided into sopranos and altos, along with a solo voice for few cues. Holly Sedillos was chosen to record the solo vocals after several vocal auditions by other female singers including children. Sedillos' vocals were predominantly featured in the end credits. The choir further recorded worldless vocal sounds with the orchestra together, unlike most sessions where choir and orchestra were recorded separately which could be mixed together, Williams wanted the players to be present in the same room at the same time.

== Release ==
The 16-track album consisting of Williams' score was released digitally through Back Lot Music day-and-date with the film on June 12, 2026. Waxwork Records published the album in CDs and LPs.

== Reception ==
Zanobard Reviews rated 8/10 to the score and wrote "John Williams' quieter, more restrained and subtle score for Disclosure Day may not appeal to all, but the absolutely gorgeous melancholy that its meticulously-crafted main themes and sublimely strings-led orchestral style evoke is well worth the price of admission." Jonathan Broxton of Movie Music UK wrote "Disclosure Day is not one of John Williams's very best scores, and it is certainly not one of Steven Spielberg's best films, but the fact that Williams can still write music with this much beauty, this much craft, this much intensity, and this much emotion at 94 years old is something no one should take for granted."

Brian Tallerico of RogerEbert.com said that the "fantastic score from John Williams amplif[ies] the tension and humanity even higher". Justin Chang of The New Yorker said that "the reliable stirrings of a John Williams score, left me dispiritingly dry-eyed." David Rooney of The Hollywood Reporter wrote "John Williams' full-bodied score (which stands among the veteran composer's finest) makes for an exciting watch". Dan Jolin of Empire called it "a stirring John Williams score". Ian Stokes of Space.com wrote "Regular collaborator John Williams tackles the score, and it's so evocative of the early Spielberg magic this flick is trying to recapture".

Chris Bumbray of JoBlo.com wrote "John Williams' score is terrific," while for the same website, Michael Conway stated: "A lot of that emotional lift comes from John Williams, who reminds you pretty quickly why his music and Spielberg's images are such an insane pairing. There were moments in this score that felt like classic Amblin adventure music, with that old school feeling of movement, wonder, and danger all at once. It feels like Williams is tapping back into that same feeling without just recycling his past work." Kevin Maher of The Times called it a "rousing" score. Dana Stevens of Slate wrote "[the] score by even-longer-time collaborator John Williams, with a mournful symphonic hook that serves, after a few reprises, as an old-school Hollywood movie theme."

Nikki Baughan of Screen International wrote "Also sympatico with Spielberg's approach is composer John Williams, who, at 94, has now scored 30 features for the director. One may well expect his trademark leitmotifs and sweeping orchestration but while the score is recognisably Williams, it is a restrained and pensive work that, surprisingly, works to play down the intensity. Daniel and Margaret are not traditional heroes; rather ordinary people attempting to feel their way through an extraordinary situation, and the music responds in kind. There is none of the swashbuckle of Indiana Jones or the pomp of Jurassic Park; often questioning, sometimes hesitant, the score builds in confidence and authority alongside the characters."

Chris Evangelista of /Film stated: "Disclosure Day is yet another partnership between the filmmaker and composer John Williams, and while it almost seems trite to talk about yet another Spielberg/Williams score (this is their 30th film together!), the work Williams is doing here is absolutely wonderful. That the legendary composer is 94 and still able to create something this memorable is worth celebrating. Williams' Disclosure Day score isn't loaded with hum-worthy melodies like his work on Spielberg's Jaws, the Indiana Jones films, or Jurassic Park, but rather more subtle, more haunting; it only enhances the aforementioned dream-like atmosphere. It's a unique blend of the ominous and the beautiful."

== Track listing ==
All tracks are written by John Williams.

No.	Title	Length
1.	"Listen"	4:08
2.	"Memory"	4:07
3.	"Dive"	4:37
4.	"Chase"	2:14
5.	"Believe"	3:35
6.	"In Vivo"	2:49
7.	"Negotiation"	3:25
8.	"Empathy"	2:24
9.	"Celestial"	6:50
10.	"Unseen"	3:09
11.	"KCXE"	5:56
12.	"Signs"	2:37
13.	"Home"	3:37
14.	"Caught"	5:56
15.	"Disclosure"	4:22
16.	"Reprise"	4:54
Total length:		64:40

Note

- All track titles are stylized in lower case and with an ellipsis (...) at the end; for example, "Listen" is stylized as "listen...".

== Personnel ==
Credits adapted from liner notes:

- Music composer and producer: John Williams
- Orchestrator and conductor: John Williams, Randy Kerber, William Ross
- Concertmaster: Roger Wilkie
- Orchestra contractor: Timothy Loo
- Choir contractor: Elyse Willis
- Synth programming: Randy Kerber, Zachariah Rose
- Recording studio: Sony Pictures Studios Scoring Stage
- Mixing studio: Barbara Mclean Stage
- Recording and mixing engineer: Shawn Murphy
- Score recordist: Erik Swanson
- Music editor: Ramiro Belgardt
- Score editor: Robert Wolff
- Stage crew: Greg Dennen, Chandler Harrod, Julianne Mccormack, Assen Stoyanov, Keith Ukrisna
- Music preparation: Joann Kane Music Service
- Copyist: Mark Graham
- Librarians: Victor Pesavento, Trevor Motycka, Daniel Swanberg

Vocalists

- Altos: Lindsay Abdou, Garineh Avakian, Nike St. Clair, Janelle Destefano, Tracy Van Fleet, Callista Hoffman-campbell, Shabnam Kalbasi, Sharon Chohi Kim, Sharmila G. Lash, Sarah Lynch, Adriana Manfredi, Julia Metzler Laura Smith Roethe, Jessie Shulman, Ilana Summers, Kimberly Switzer, Elyse Willis
- Sopranos: April Amante, Harriet Fraser, Graycen Gardner, Kelci Hahn, Elissa Joohnston, Primrose May, Caroline McKenzie, Alina Roitstein, Anna Schubert, Kathryn Shuman, Courtney Taylor, Suzanne Waters, Andrea Zomorodian
- Vocal soloist: Holly Sedillos

Instrumentalists

- Bass: Nico Abondolo, Mike Valerio, Drew Dembowski, Steve Dress, Tim Eckert, Thomas Harte, Chris Kollgaard, Ed Meares, Geoff Osika, Stephen Pfeiffer, Eric Shetzen
- Bassoon: Rose Corrigan, Alex Garcia, William May, Anthony Parnther, Jon Stehney
- Celeste: Tom Ranier, Robert Thies
- Cello: Jake Braun, Niall Ferguson, Vanessa Freebairn-smith, Ross Gasworth, Ismael Guerrero Bombut, Trevor Handy, Dennis Karmazyn, Mike Kaufman, Ben Lash, Dane Little, David Low, Hillary Smith, Cecilia Tsan, Charlie Tyler
- Clarinet: Don Foster, Stuart Clark, Juan Gallegos, Eric Jacobs, Josh Ranz, Jonathan Sacdalan, Laura Stoutenborough
- Flute: Heather Clark, Johanna Borenstein, Jenni Olson, Geri Rotella, Ben Smolen
- Harp: Joann Turovsky, Marcia Dickstein
- Horn: Dylan Hart, Laura Brenes, Allen Fogle, Lisa Mccormick, Mike Mccoy, Adedeji Ogunfolu, Jaclyn Rainey, Teag Reaves, Stephanie Thomas
- Oboe: Lara Wickes, Jessica Pearlman, Lelie Resnick, Ted Sugata
- Percussion: Greg Goodall, Ted Atkatz, Wade Culbreath, Brian Kilgore, Ken Mcgrath
- Piano: Joanne Pearce Martin, Robert Thies
- Synthesizer: Alan Steinberger, Randy Kerber
- Timpani: Greg Goodall, Don Williams
- Trumpet: Jon Lewis, Rob Schaer, Adam Bhatia, Miles McAllister, Barry Perkins, Dan Rosenboom, Mike Stever
- Trombone: Bill Booth, Nick Daley, Todd Eames, Alex Iles, Phil Keen, Bill Reichenbach
- Tuba: Doug Tornquist
- Violin: Ben Jacobson, Alyssa Park, Eun Mee Ahn, Aroussiak Baltaian, Charlie Bisharat, Jackie Brand, Sandy Cameron, Yaeri Choi, Eugenia Choi, Bruce Dukov, Nina Evtuhov, Jen Choi Fischer, Lorenz Gamma, Kyle Gilner, Jessica Guideri, Tamara Hatwan, Amy Hershberger, Luanne Homzy, Maia Jasper White, Gallia Kastner, Carrie Kennedy, Kevin Kumar, Marisa Kuney, Ana Landauer, Haesol Lee, Songa Lee, Natalie Leggett, Phillip Levy, Lorand Lokuszta, Maya Magub, Helen Nightengale, Grace Oh, Sara Parkins, Radu Pieptea, Adrianne Pope, Heather Powell, Rafael Rishik, Mark Robertson, Julie Rogers, Luke Santonastaso, Michelle Sheehy, Tereza Stanislav, Ashoka Thiagarajan, Sarah Thornblade, Misha Vayman, Ina Veli, Josefina Vergara, Shalini Vijayan, Irina Voloshina, Stephanie Yu
- Viola: Rob Brophy, Meredith Crawford, Andrew Duckles, Alma Fernandez, Kevin Hsu, Leah Katz, Shawn Mann, Luke Maurer, Jonathan Moerschel, Aaron Oltman, Linnea Powell, Carson Rick, Erik Rynearson, Jonah Sirota, Stefan Smith, Jarrett Threadgill, Diana Wade, David Walther, Emily Williams

== Charts ==
Chart performance for Disclosure Day (Original Motion Picture Soundtrack)
Chart (2026)	Peak position
UK Album Downloads (Official Charts)	15
UK Classical Albums (OCC)	2
UK Soundtrack Albums (Official Charts)	12
US Top Classical Albums (Billboard)	7
US Top Classical Crossover Albums (Billboard)	6
