= The Death House =

2015 horror novel by Sarah Pinborough

- First edition (UK)
- Author: Sarah Pinborough
- Genre: Horror/Dystopian Romance
- Published: 2015
- Publisher: Gollancz (UK), Titan Books (US)
- Media type: Print, e-book
- Pages: 288
- ISBN: 1473202329
- Preceded by: Murder

The Death House is a horror novel by English author Sarah Pinborough. It was first published in the United Kingdom on 26 February 2015 through Gollancz and was published in the United States through Titan Books later that same year.

The book was shortlisted for the British Fantasy Award for Best Horror Novel (August Derleth Award) for 2016.

== Synopsis ==
The book centers on Toby, a young boy living in England at some point in the future. Until recently he had led a normal, peaceful existence, something that ended after a blood test marked him as a "Defective". He's quickly sent away to the Death House, a boarding school for children whose blood has marked them as different from those around him. Toby is terrified, as he's given little information about what is going on or what exactly is going on with his body. All he knows is that the nurses and staff monitor him and his fellow students closely for any changes in their health, bodies, and behaviors. Anyone who begins to show changes are sent away in the night to places unknown, never to return. Toby tries hard to avoid notice, even going so far as to sleep during the daytime so he can wander around at night undisturbed, as the others take sleeping pills in order to slumber the night away. It's only when Clara arrives that his makeshift routine is disrupted, causing him to seek more out of life.

== Reception ==
Critical reception has been mostly positive and the work has received comparisons to Kazuo Ishiguro's Never Let Me Go and William Golding's Lord of the Flies. Praise for the book typically centered upon the characters, their relationships with one another, and the work's themes of life and death, with SFF World writing that it "makes the reader think about the joys of discovery and the simple wonders that are around us, that we sometimes take for granted." SciFiNow praised the work, stating that "The Death House is shocking and gripping, albeit ultimately hopeful and utterly moving, and it’s Pinborough’s finest novel to date." Tor.com was more mixed, stating that "Though it’s never less than completely competent, and occasionally, yes, exceptional, in the final summation The Death House proved too formulaic to truly move me."

=== Awards ===
- August Derleth Award for Best Horror Novel (2016, nominated)
