= The Fabelmans (soundtrack) =

Soundtrack album by John Williams
- Released: November 11, 2022
- Recorded: 2022
- Studio: Sony Pictures Scoring Stage, Culver City, California
- Genre: Film score
- Length: 31:14
- Label: Sony Classical
- Producer: John Williams; Ramio Belgardt

John Williams chronology
| Star Wars: The Rise of Skywalker (2019) | The Fabelmans (2022) | Indiana Jones and the Dial of Destiny (2023) |

The Fabelmans (Original Motion Picture Soundtrack) is the score album to the 2022 film of the same name, directed by Steven Spielberg. The musical score is composed and conducted by John Williams, in his 31st collaboration with Spielberg and the 50th anniversary of their first film, and also, Williams' last film he would score (along with Indiana Jones and the Dial of Destiny) before retirement, a decision he would later retract. The film's soundtrack was released digitally by Sony Classical on November 11, 2022, and was released on physical CD on December 9, 2022.

== Production ==
Recording of the score began in March 2022, following Williams's concert performance with the Vienna Philharmonic at Vienna's Musikverein. In July, stills from the recording sessions were revealed by one of the film's crew members, revealing that scoring of the film is underway. Along with his usual orchestral style, Williams opted for a score mostly relying on piano, with Joanne Pearce Martin, principal pianist of the Los Angeles Philharmonic, providing the piano solos. The film also features source classical music selected by Spielberg himself, some of which are performed on piano in the film by Mitzi Fabelman (Michelle Williams), from composers such as Friedrich Kuhlau, Muzio Clementi, Johann Sebastian Bach and Joseph Haydn.

== Reception ==
=== Critical response ===
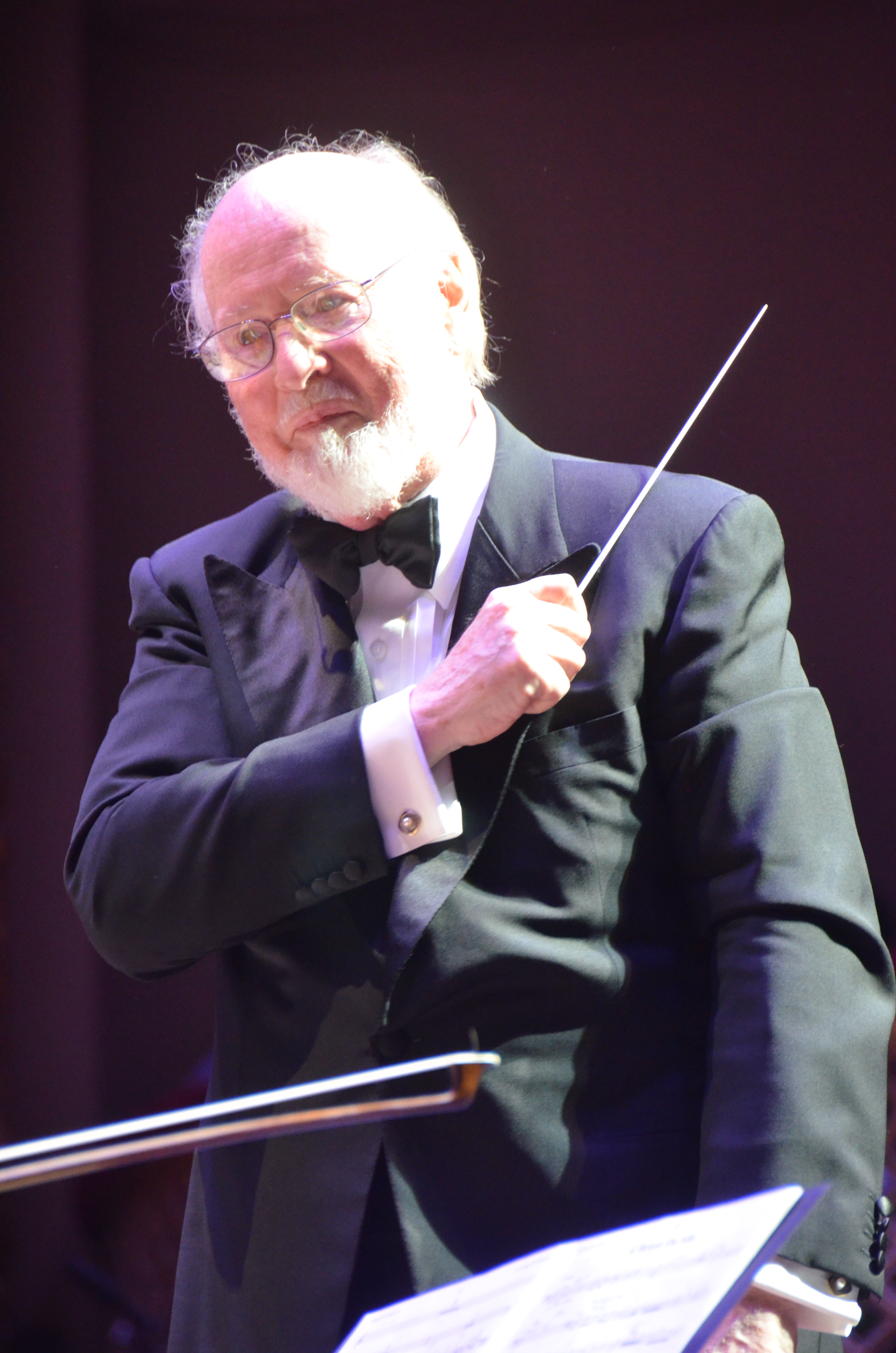
John Williams received acclaim for his score.

The score by John Williams received acclaim from critics, with some calling it "one of his best scores". Leah Greenblatt of Entertainment Weekly called it a "lofty, glimmering score". Jericho Tadeo of MovieWeb wrote: "John Williams' score, yet another with an established working relationship with Spielberg, is the musical heartbeat of The Fabelmans, at once grand and whispering when the moment calls for it." Apart from complimenting Williams' score, Deadline Hollywood writer Pete Hammond praised the use of pop songs of the time like "Walk On By" and "Goodbye Cruel World" that "really takes us right back there with Spielberg himself". Ross Bonaime called it "naturally moving". J. Don Birnam of Below The Line wrote that John Williams "offers up another fresh score that merges seamlessly into the proceedings". JoBlo.com said: "John Williams contributes a sparse score, with much of the film scored by Mitzi's piano playing." Reuben Baron of Looper called Williams' score "great".

Music critic Jonathan Broxton of Movie Music UK wrote, "The Fabelmans is, at its core, an intimate portrait of a 50-year friendship, filled with the quiet dignity that befits what is, basically, two old men looking back on the personal and professional life they have shared. There's a sense of finality here, a coda to a life that has included heroic marches and moments of soaring triumph, epic battles, passionate romantic love, and deep, powerful emotions, but which is now about winding down, looking back at all the things that led them to this moment in time, and smiling in quiet satisfaction."

=== Industry response ===
With The Fablemans' strong critical response at the Toronto International Film Festival premiere, possibilities of nominations in major ceremonies were highlighted by media and industry, with Williams getting the final nomination for Best Original Score at the 95th Academy Awards being possible. GoldDerby predicted that Williams' score is considered as the leading contender for that category, while also predicting the possibilities of a win. IndieWire reported that Williams' score will be shortlisted as the eligibility requirement for a score that consisted of pre-existing recorded material was lowered down to 35 percent. The film's score album included classical pieces from several composers in the 1950s and 1960s. This rule would benefit the possible nomination of the film's score. Variety also considered Williams' score as one of the strong contenders for Best Original Score at the 80th Golden Globe Awards. It would ultimately be nominated for both of these awards, but lost to Babylon and the 2022 adaptation of All Quiet on the Western Front respectively. In 2023, the score was nominated for Best Score Soundtrack for Visual Media at the 66th Annual Grammy Awards, but lost to Oppenheimer.

== Track listing ==
The Fabelmans (Original Motion Picture Soundtrack)
| No. | Title | Writer(s) | Artist(s) | Length |
|---|---|---|---|---|
| 1. | "The Fabelmans" | John Williams | Williams | 2:13 |
| 2. | "Mitzi's Dance" | Williams | Williams | 2:05 |
| 3. | "Sonatina in A Minor, Op. 88 No. 3: III. Allegro burlesco" | Friedrich Kuhlau | Joanne Pearce Martin | 1:51 |
| 4. | "Midnight Call" | Williams | Williams | 2:23 |
| 5. | "Reverie" | Williams | Williams | 1:44 |
| 6. | "Mother and Son" | Williams | Williams | 2:28 |
| 7. | "Sonatina in C Major, Op. 36 No. 3: Spiritoso" | Muzio Clementi | Martin | 1:58 |
| 8. | "Reflections" | Williams | Williams | 2:02 |
| 9. | "Concerto in D Minor, BWV 974: II. Adagio" | Johann Sebastian Bach | Martin; Williams | 3:46 |
| 10. | "New House" | Williams | Williams | 2:28 |
| 11. | "The Letter" | Williams | Williams | 2:08 |
| 12. | "The Journey Begins (includes excerpt from Sonata No. 48 in C Major, HOB. XVI: 35: I. Allegro con brio)" | Williams; Joseph Haydn | Williams | 6:08 |
| Total length: | | | | 31:14 |

== Additional music ==
Songs of the film's time period that are included in the film, but are not included on the soundtrack include "Walk On By" by Dionne Warwick and "Goodbye Cruel World" by James Darren, the latter being used to accompany the montage sequence where Sammy Fabelman (Gabriel LaBelle) documents his high school's Ditch Day on film. Scott Joplin's "Elite Syncopations" (1902) also appears twice in the film. Music sampled from Elmer Bernstein's score to The Magnificent Seven (1960) and Alfred Newman's score to How the West Was Won (1962) respectively underscore Sammy's 8mm short films Gunsmog and Escape to Nowhere when they are played for his family and friends at the Boy Scout assemblies.

== Personnel ==
Credits adapted from CD liner notes.

- John Williams – composer, producer, conductor
- Ramiro Belgardt – producer, music editor
- Shawn Murphy – recording, mixing
- Joanne Pearce Martin – piano solos

== Release history ==
Release dates and formats for The Fabelmans (Original Motion Picture Soundtrack)
| Region | Date | Format(s) | Label | Ref. |
|---|---|---|---|---|
| Various | November 11, 2022 | Digital download; streaming | Sony Classical | |
| Various | December 9, 2022 | CD | Sony Classical | |
