= Disclosure Day =

2026 film by Steven Spielberg

- Theatrical release poster
- Directed by: Steven Spielberg
- Screenplay by: David Koepp
- Story by: Steven Spielberg
- Produced by: Kristie Macosko Krieger; Steven Spielberg
- Starring: Emily Blunt; Josh O'Connor; Colin Firth; Eve Hewson; Colman Domingo
- Cinematography: Janusz Kamiński
- Edited by: Sarah Broshar
- Music by: John Williams
- Production companies: Universal Pictures; Amblin Entertainment
- Distributed by: Universal Pictures
- Release dates: June 2, 2026 (Le Grand Rex); June 12, 2026 (United States)
- Running time: 145 minutes
- Country: United States
- Language: English
- Budget: $115 million
- Box office: $246.8 million

Disclosure Day is a 2026 American science fiction thriller film directed and produced by Steven Spielberg from a screenplay by David Koepp, based on a story by Spielberg. The film stars an ensemble cast, including Emily Blunt, Josh O'Connor, Colin Firth, Eve Hewson, and Colman Domingo. In the film, a television meteorologist (Blunt) and a cybersecurity analyst (O'Connor) go on a mission to disclose the existence of extraterrestrial life to the world, while trying to evade the trail of a government contractor (Firth), who tries to prevent them from getting the secret out.

In April 2024, it was reported that Spielberg's next project would be a UFO film, with Koepp writing the screenplay. Within the next few months, Universal Pictures was announced as distributor and Blunt was cast in the lead role. Filming took place from February to May 2025 in New York and New Jersey. John Williams composed the film's score, marking his thirtieth collaboration with Spielberg.

Disclosure Day premiered at Le Grand Rex in Paris on June 2, 2026, and was released theatrically in the United States on June 12. It received positive reviews and has grossed $246.8 million worldwide on a $115 million budget.

== Plot ==
As the planet is on the brink of a nuclear war, cybersecurity specialist Dr. Daniel Kellner has stolen material from his employer, a secretive U.S. government contractor known as the Wardex Corporation (Waived Reporting, Development, and Extraction). Daniel's theft includes an artifact of extraterrestrial technology and "The Archive": decades of documents and hard drives containing footage of extraterrestrial encounters dating to the Roswell incident. When cornered by Wardex CEO Noah Scanlon, Daniel threatens him with the extraterrestrial device and escapes with his girlfriend, Jane Blankenship; they hide at her former convent.

Meanwhile, in Kansas City, local NBC affiliate meteorologist Margaret Fairchild is preparing for work when a cardinal flies into her home. The incident stimulates a psychic ability in Margaret to intuit people's thoughts and speak in languages she has never learned. During a live weather broadcast, Margaret unexpectedly begins speaking in an unknown language then passes out. Footage of the broadcast goes viral and draws the attention of Wardex, which identifies the language as extraterrestrial. After being examined at a hospital, Margaret flees Wardex agents who are posing as the FBI.

Daniel explains to Jane that Wardex has been experimenting on extraterrestrial captives and reverse engineering their technology; he is part of a plot to reveal the truth using the Archive. Seeing the clip of Margaret speaking the extraterrestrial language, he understands what she said as if she was speaking English. Scanlon uses one of the extraterrestrial devices to telepathically force Jane to attack Daniel and later track them to a motel. Before Daniel is captured, he helps Jane escape with the extraterrestrial device.

Margaret's psychic ability allows her to locate Daniel at a black site. The two escape with the Archive when Margaret empathically convinces their captors to let them go. One of Scanlon's unaffected men, Casper Boyd, rams their car into the side of a passing freight train; Daniel pulls Margaret out in time for them to climb onto the train and escape.

Margaret and Daniel finally connect with Hugo Wakefield, who leads a team of former Wardex employees intent on disclosing evidence of extraterrestrials to the world. They have reconstructed Margaret's childhood home in order to recover suppressed memories. When they were ten, she and Daniel were simultaneously abducted by extraterrestrials and given complementary powers; the extraterrestrials disguise themselves as harmless animals in order to anonymously observe humanity and eventually awaken their powers.

Hugo's team, along with Margaret and Daniel, enter Margaret's television station to broadcast the truth. Scanlon's team turns off the power, but Jane arrives and gives her device to Margaret, who uses it to restore the power. Defeated, Scanlon and his team stand down, to Boyd's dismay, and watch as Margaret announces "Disclosure Day" to the world.

Daniel uploads the Archive to a satellite feed as the station crew broadcast the footage around the world, with a blindsided national anchorwoman attempting to narrate it. The stunned world stops to watch evidence of extraterrestrial life and the impending war seems to halt. Hugo brings an elderly extraterrestrial (Note: Known as "In Vivo 17") he secretly freed from Wardex into the studio. The extraterrestrial whispers to Daniel, who relays the message to Margaret. She returns to the camera and prepares to repeat the message, beginning by saying "Listen."

== Cast ==
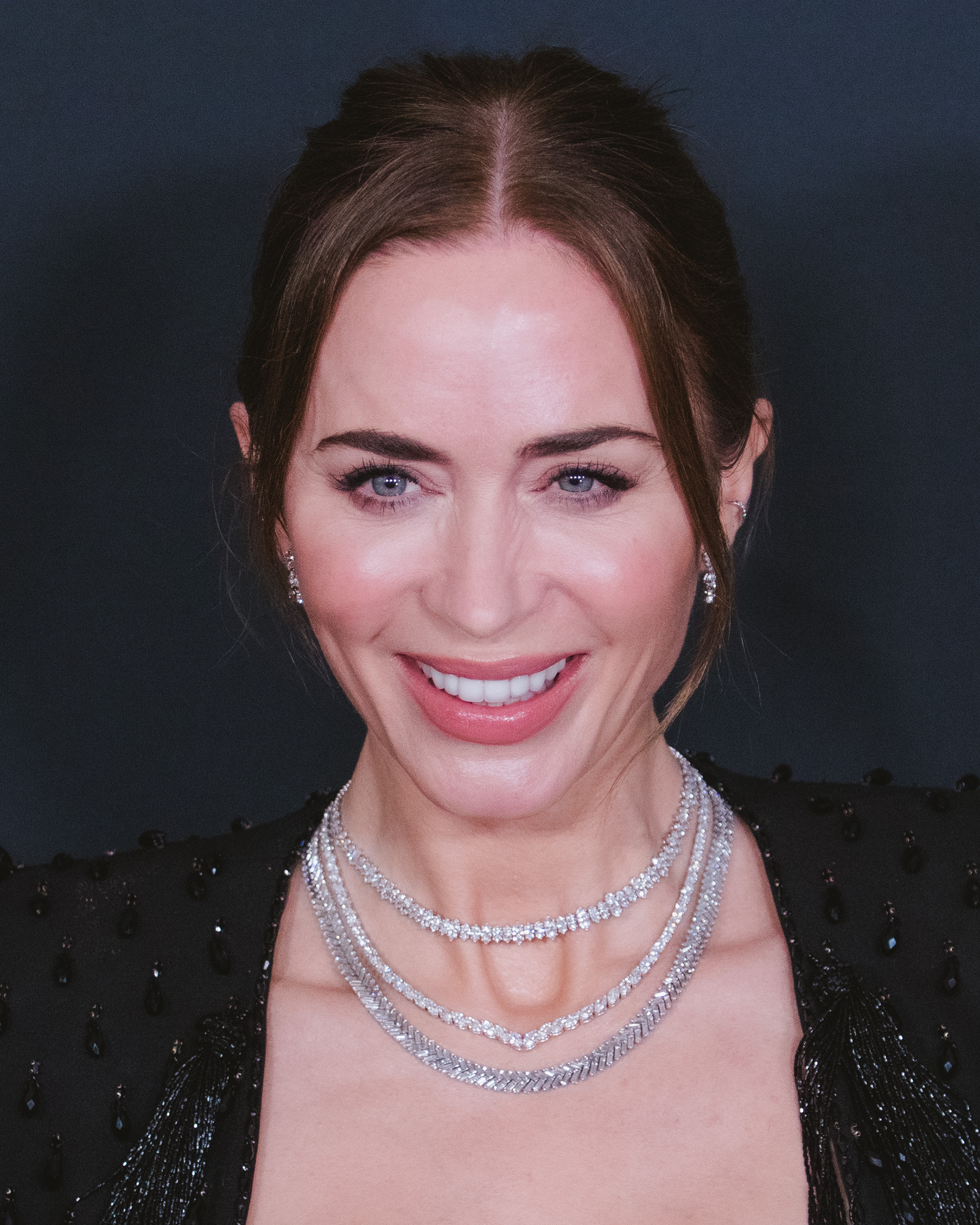
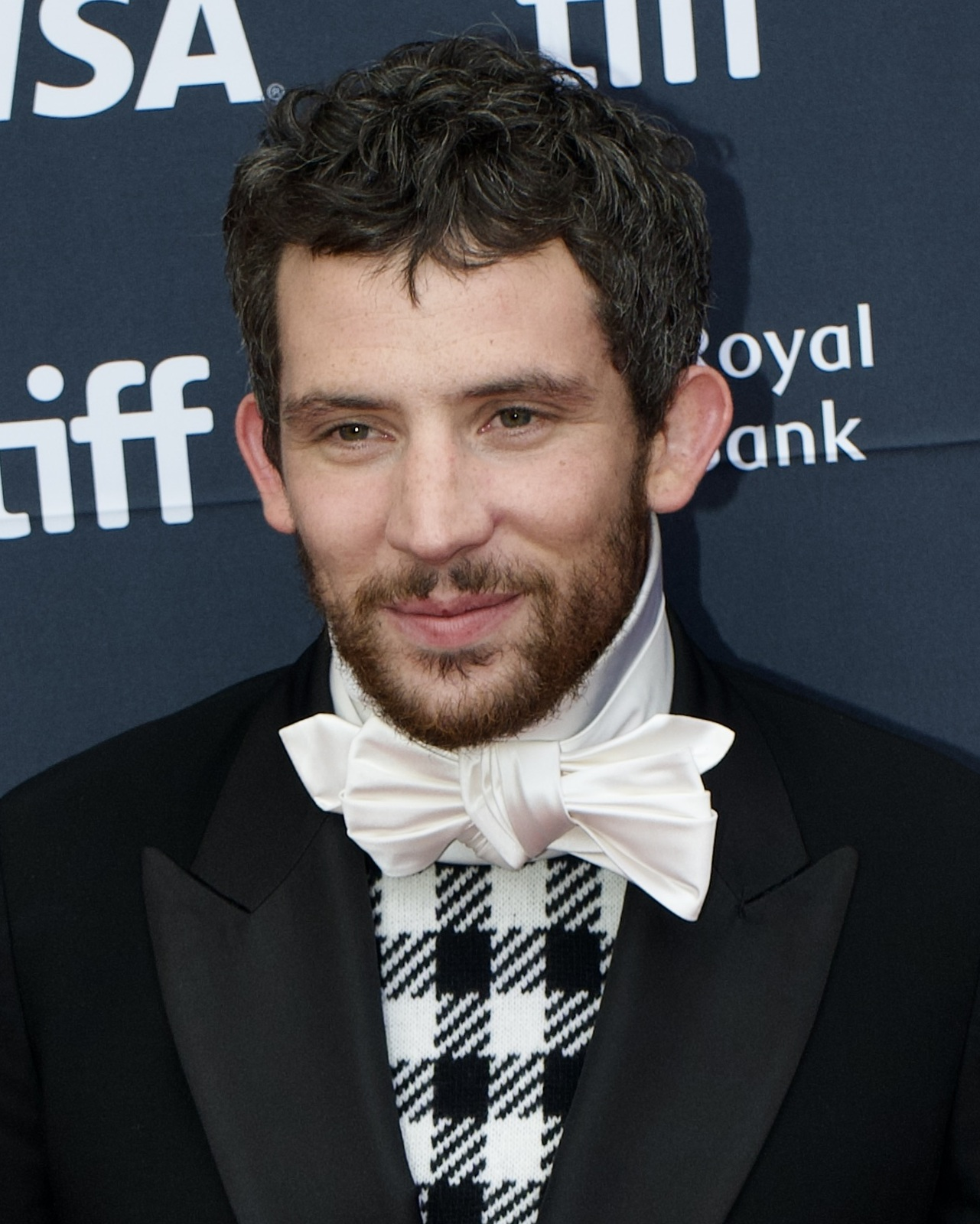
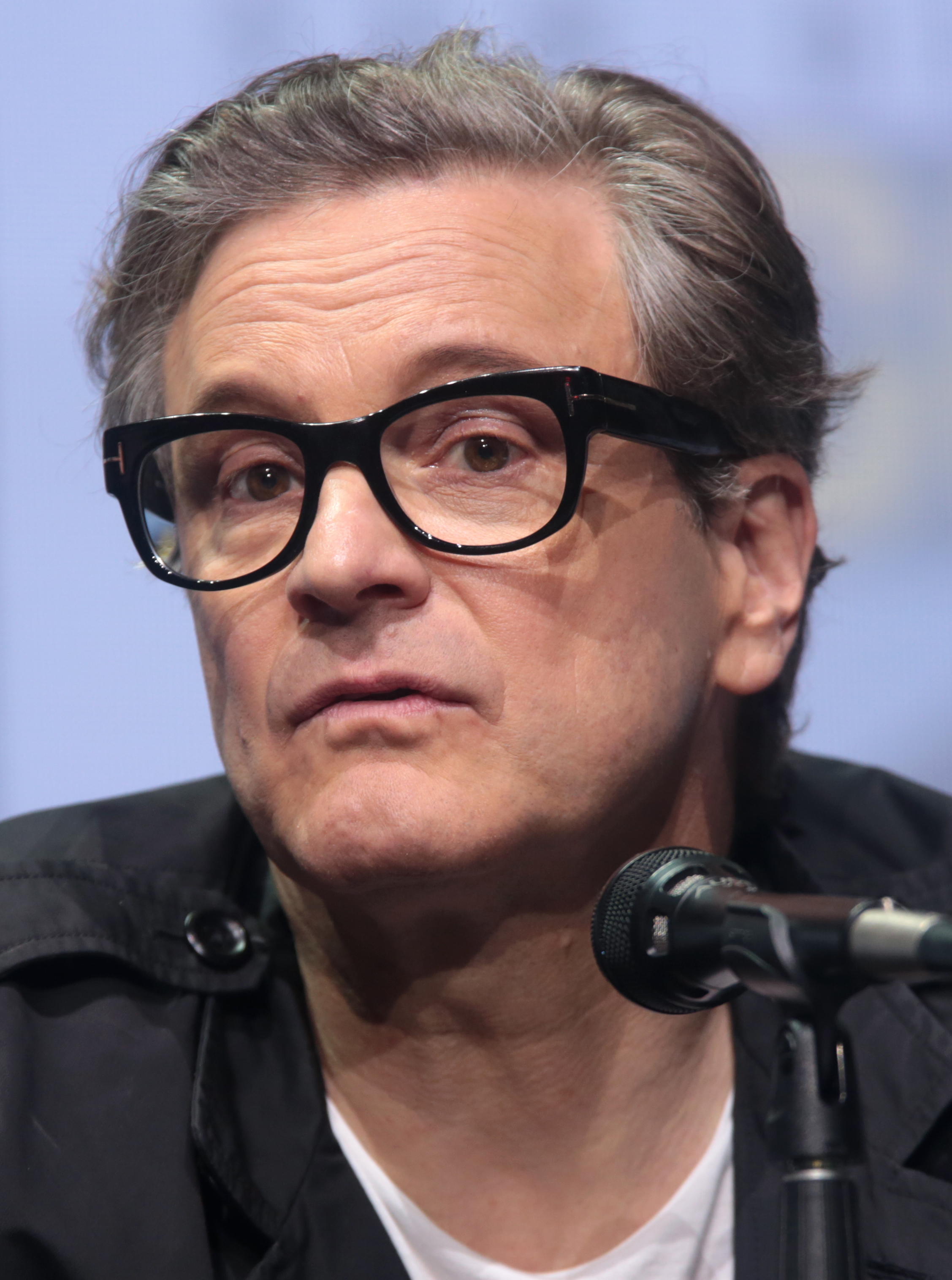
From left to right: Emily Blunt, Josh O'Connor, and Colin Firth
- Emily Blunt as Margaret Fairchild, a Kansas City TV meteorologist and former journalist
  - Delaney Cuthbert as young Margaret
- Josh O'Connor as Dr. Daniel Kellner, a cybersecurity specialist and whistleblower
  - Tyler Renaud as young Daniel
- Colin Firth as Noah Scanlon, the head of the Wardex Corporation
- Eve Hewson as Jane Blankenship, a former religious novice and Daniel's girlfriend
- Colman Domingo as Hugo Wakefield, the Wardex Director of Biological Assets turned defector and advocate for disclosure
- Wyatt Russell as Jackson, Margaret's boyfriend
- Henry Lloyd-Hughes as Casper Boyd, Scanlon's head-of-security at Wardex
- Elizabeth Marvel as Sister Maura, the Abbess of the Monastery of St. Clare of the Dawn
- Hettienne Park as Serena, a senior Wardex agent
- Tommy Martinez as Dave Santiago, a Wardex defector and associate of Wakefield
- Gabby Beans as Angela Childs, a Wardex analyst
- Jeremy Shamos as Claypool, a Kansas City TV employee and Margaret's boss
- Brandon Wilson as Nathan Twinning, a Wardex defector and associate of Wakefield. The name is an homage to Nathan Twining of the 1947 memo on flying discs.
- Priyanka Kedia as Grace Zhao, a Wardex defector and Wakefield's associate
- Elliot Villar as Diaz, a Wardex agent
- Noah Robbins as Munsey, a Wardex agent
- Michael Gaston as General Dobbs, the Wardex military liaison

Additionally, Brian Cage, Lance Hoyt, and Chavo Guerrero Jr. cameo as the blue wrestler, the red wrestler, and the wrestling referee, respectively. Today veteran stage manager David Auerbach plays a Rock Center news producer in the final act of the film. Elizabeth Stanley plays a KCXE anchor in the film. Courtney Grace plays the NBC anchorwoman who delivers the breaking news report at the end of the film. Patricia Conolly appears uncredited in the role of Ruth.

== Production ==
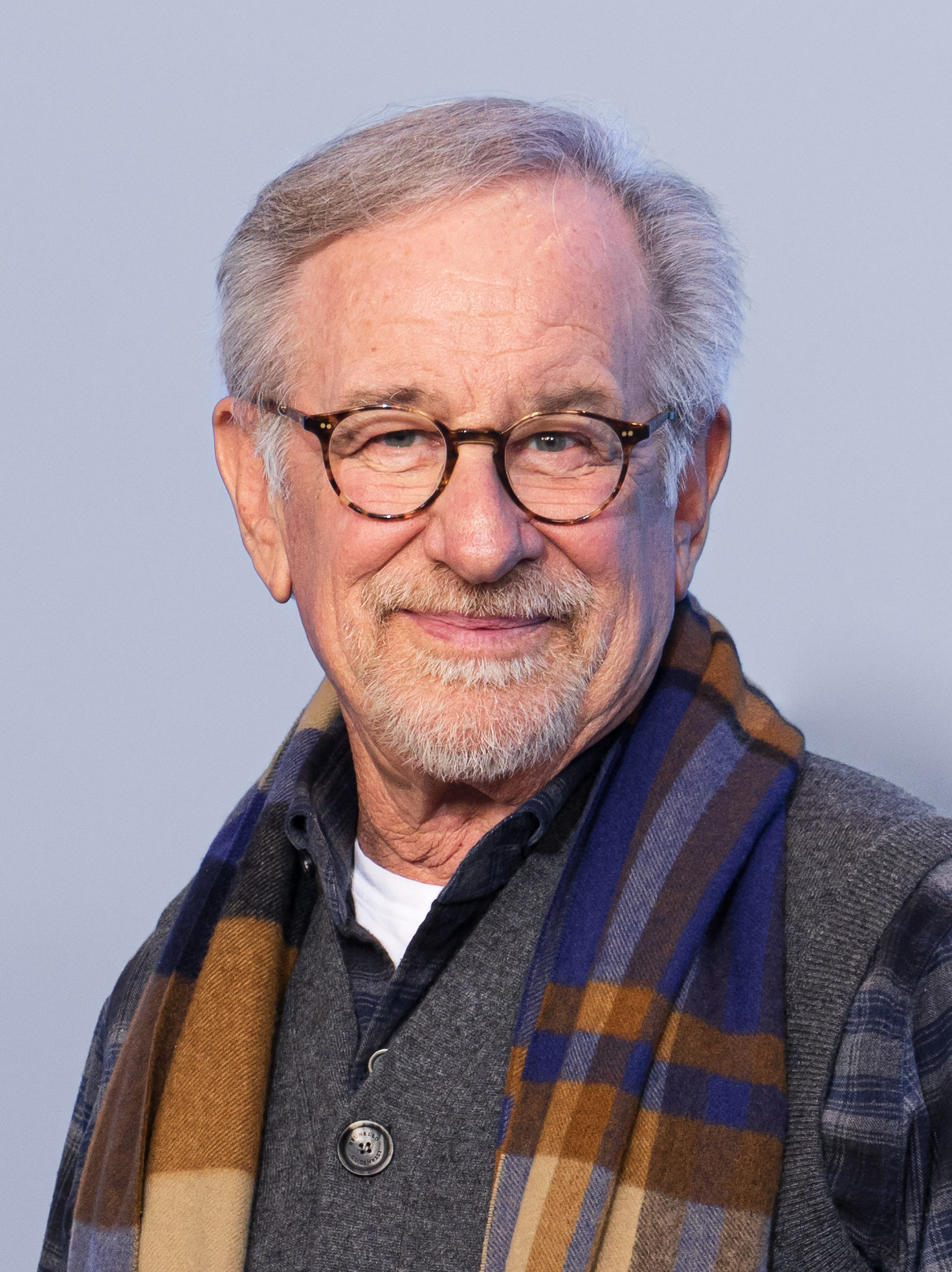
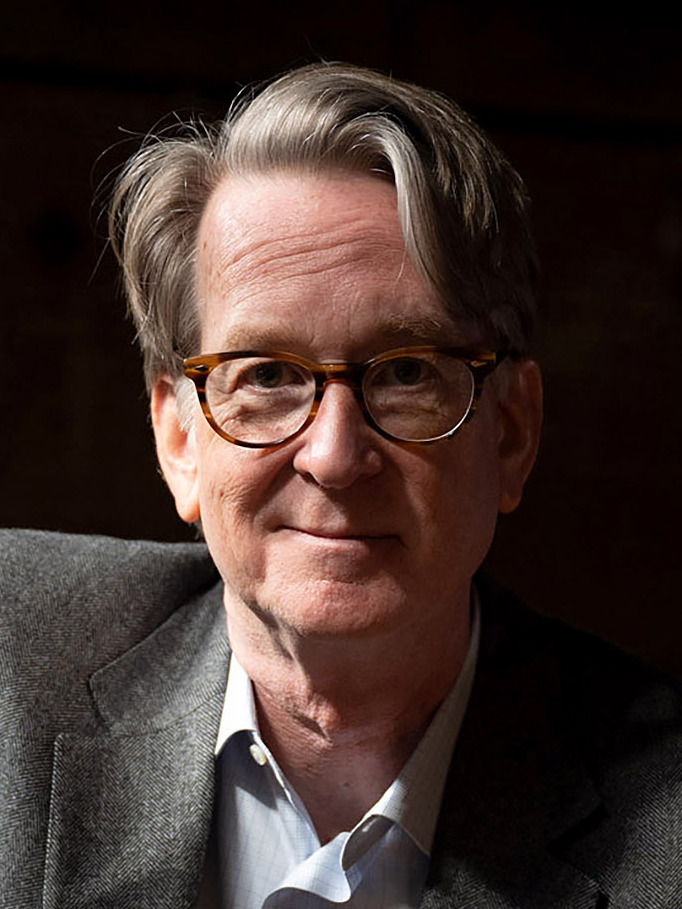
Disclosure Day marked the fifth collaboration between director Steven Spielberg (left) and screenwriter David Koepp

=== Development ===
In the summer of 2023, Steven Spielberg spent two months writing a 50–60 page story outline that would serve as the basis of Disclosure Day. Spielberg was inspired by the 2017 article "Glowing Auras and 'Black Money': The Pentagon's Mysterious U.F.O. Program", published in The New York Times, which he described as having rekindled his interest in the subject. In April 2024, it was publicly announced that Spielberg's next directing project would be a UFO film based on his own original idea, with David Koepp, who had previously collaborated with Spielberg on multiple films, writing the screenplay from Spielberg's original story.

After receiving the initial treatment from Spielberg, via email, Koepp would develop forty-two drafts for the film's screenplay, the most of his career. On collaborating with Spielberg, Koepp went on to say: "It's something he had carried around in his head for decades [...] I felt a particular obligation to not fuck it up [...] you're always trying to be deferential to where the idea comes from. With Jurassic Park, I'm trying to respect the book as much as possible; War of the Worlds, same thing; Indiana Jones? Talk about deferential [...] But in this, I'm helping this guy tell his story, even as it grew into my story too." Koepp avoided the word "alien" in the script to prevent political distractions, saying, "'Aliens' also has a second meaning in terms of immigration. And we didn't want anyone to be able to dismiss anything or be distracted. So we use 'extraterrestrial', we use 'biological life forms', 'non-human biologics'. There's a number of other terms that we use instead."

In May 2024, Universal Pictures was announced as the film's distributor. The following month, Emily Blunt was cast in the lead role. From August to December, Colin Firth, Eve Hewson, Colman Domingo, Josh O'Connor, and Wyatt Russell joined the cast. (Note: Attributed to multiple references:) This project marks the third film Spielberg had cast Domingo in (including an unrealized George Gershwin film) and the second film he had cast Hewson and Elizabeth Marvel in. In addition to Domingo, Hewson and Marvel, many of the core cast (including Blunt, Firth, O'Connor, and Henry Lloyd-Hughes) were offered their roles without having to audition. Hewson revealed that for her audition process, Spielberg met with her, via Zoom, telling her that he has "a script I want you to read; your character's Jane." After being hand-delivered the script by someone from Spielberg's team, the pair took one more Zoom meeting, during which Hewson pitched Spielberg some ideas for the character, and was offered the role by the end of the week.

In May 2025, Paul Tazewell revealed that he would serve as costume designer, marking his second collaboration with Spielberg following West Side Story (2021).

=== Filming ===
Principal photography (under the title Non-View) began on February 26, 2025, in Montville, New Jersey and New York City. A casting call for Long Island–based background actors to play "wrestling fans" for a scene to be shot on March 4, 2025, was issued on January 16, 2025. The wrestling match scene was shot in the Paramount Theater in Huntington in Long Island, New York. Subsequent casting calls in March 2025 sought background talent in the Hudson Valley area of New York state and the Middlesex County area of New Jersey. The Middlesex County casting call exclusively requested participants who could drive their own vehicles in the film, while the Hudson Valley casting call additionally requested actors to play diner patrons and hotel guests. Additional casting calls sought actors to portray North Korean soldiers.

Exteriors of the freight train sequence were filmed on the Cape May Seashore Lines railroad in Tuckahoe, New Jersey and Woodbine, New Jersey in March 2025. Lloyd-Hughes revealed that a real train was used for the sequence with a real car crashing into it, and that he drove the car into the train tracks himself. Spielberg spent three weeks, alongside his cast and crew, to shoot the set piece with a few days dedicated to filming Lloyd-Hughes crashing into the car carrying Blunt and O'Connor. In early April, filming took place in the McGinley Square neighborhood of Jersey City.

The New Jersey Innovation Institute at the New Jersey Institute of Technology in Newark, New Jersey was used as the KCXE television studio. Scenes set in the NBC control room at 30 Rockefeller Plaza were filmed on location there, with real newsroom employees acting in the film in supporting roles. The West Virginia safe house where Daniel and Jane hide was a set built at Fosterfields in Morris Township, New Jersey. The convent exterior was the Community of St John Baptist in Mendham Township, New Jersey. The quarry car chase was filmed at Dibbles Quarry in Elka Park, New York. Republic Airport in East Farmingdale, New York was used for two scenes. Margaret's rescue of Daniel from the Wardex black site was filmed at the American Airpower Museum at the airport, and the classified footage of Richard Nixon showing Jackie Gleason the extraterrestrial bodies was also filmed at the airport. The classified footage of extraterrestrial encounters was filmed at an industrial site with abandoned LNG tanks in Rossville, Staten Island.

The exterior scenes of the Wardex headquarters were filmed at the Canon Americas Headquarters in Melville, New York. Studio filming took place at Steiner Studios at the Brooklyn Navy Yard, where the large Wardex Headquarters interior set was built. In June, Koepp confirmed production on the film had wrapped in late May.

For the scene where Margaret speaks an alien language while on-camera, Blunt was told her dialogue would be enhanced using AI post-processing techniques. Instead, she used her vocal training to create a distinct set of vocalizations and performed them in a single four-minute long take. However, Spielberg later denied Blunt's claims and said he "would never have used AI" for the film.

=== Cinematography ===
Longtime Spielberg collaborator Janusz Kamiński served as cinematographer, filming the project predominately on 35 mm film using Panavision Panaflex Millennium XL2 cameras equipped with C and T series anamorphic format lenses for a 2.39:1 aspect ratio. Certain low light scenes were filmed using the digital Sony CineAlta Venice 2 camera. For the freight train sequence, Kamiński crafted a massive crane shot from 50 feet away as the camera arrived on the actor's reactions. "It was very difficult. 90% of that is live photography. Everything you see we created on camera," Kamiński explained, adding, "Sometimes the train would not move, such as when Emily and Josh were climbing onto the train. We had that car attached, along with effects like smoke, wind, and dust. Brian Machleit, the stunt coordinator, spent several days with the second team on the active railroad track we had under control, where the train was moving at maybe 15 miles an hour, and he made all the wide shots. We sped it up a tiny bit, added some extra trees, and there was one little moment where we did face replacement on the stunt people, but that was it."

=== Production design ===
Adam Stockhausen, the film's production designer, previously collaborated with Spielberg on Bridge of Spies (2015), Ready Player One (2018), and West Side Story (2021). Stockhausen collaborated with VFX studios Framestore and Territory for the production. For the Wardex command center, Stockhausen drew architectural and interior design inspiration from such real-world structures as the old AT&T headquarters in New York, NASA's mission control center, images of military "war rooms", train station hubs, and Japanese brutalism. "The initial discussions were just about the nature of the work that was going on there and trying to make this exciting space for it," Stockhausen explained.

=== Visual effects ===
The visual effects were developed by Digital Domain, Storm Studios and Wētā FX, overseen by production visual effects supervisors Matthew E. Butler and Joel Behrens, and production visual effects producer Lauren Ritchie.

== Soundtrack ==
In October 2025, it was announced that John Williams was composing the score for the film, his 30th collaboration with Spielberg. Williams began writing the score in the summer and would record it in seven sessions over a six-month period, with the final recording session taking place on February 20, 2026.

Back Lot Music released the official soundtrack album, which was released digitally, while Waxwork Records released the physical editions on June 12, 2026.

In June 2026, discussing Williams' method for Disclosure Day and how his score would be experienced in the film, Spielberg revealed that Williams said, "This time I'm going to write music not to lead the film, I'm going to write music under the film to give it the slight nudge forward." The director pointed to Close Encounters of the Third Kind and Indiana Jones as a benchmark for Williams' more "symphonic", theme-driven style. "This is more subtle, but it's still pure John Williams genius," he concluded.

== Marketing ==
The marketing for Disclosure Day cost about $80 million. According to Spielberg, the entire third act of the film was kept out of the marketing.

On December 10, 2025, billboards appeared in multiple cities, including Los Angeles and New York City, that featured an image of an upside down eye framed within the silhouette of a bird, teasing the then-untitled film with the tagline "ALL WILL BE DISCLOSED. SPIELBERG. 06.12.26". Six days later, the title of the film was officially revealed with the release of the teaser trailer before select screenings of Avatar: Fire and Ash.

On February 8, 2026, during Super Bowl LX, a TV spot for the film aired with new footage. The theatrical release poster and official trailer were released the following month on March 12. In April, extended footage was shown during the Universal Pictures presentation at CinemaCon. The final trailer and IMAX poster were released on May 27. Filmed at Citi Field, professional baseball shortstop Francisco Lindor appeared as himself in a 30-second TV spot for the film that premiered on June 4.

== Release ==
=== Theatrical ===
Originally set to be released on May 15, 2026, Disclosure Day had its world premiere at Le Grand Rex in Paris on June 2, 2026, followed by the British premiere at Cineworld in Leicester Square, London on June 4, and the American premiere at the David H. Koch Theater at Lincoln Center in New York City on June 8.

The film opened theatrically in IMAX in the United Kingdom on June 10, 2026, and released in the United States on June 12. It also received a limited release on 70 mm film prints blown up from the native 35 mm print, in addition to other premium large formats.

=== Home media ===
Disclosure Day was released on digital streaming and VOD platforms on July 21, 2026. It was released on 4K Ultra HD Blu-ray, Blu-ray, and DVD by Universal Pictures Home Entertainment on August 25.

It was released to the streaming service Peacock on October 9, 2026.

== Reception ==
=== Box office ===
Disclosure Day grossed $116.6 million in the United States and Canada, and $130.2 million in other territories, for a worldwide total of $246.8 million.

By May 29, 2026, prior to the film's release in the United States and Canada, Boxoffice Pro projected an opening weekend of $40–50 million. On June 10, Deadline Hollywood projected an opening weekend of around $65 million worldwide. The film made $6.5 million from Thursday previews in the United States. After making $19.1 million on Friday (including previews), it ended up debuting in first with $44 million from 3,824 screens at the domestic box office and an additional $49 million from 73 overseas markets, for a worldwide total opening of $93 million. 60% of moviegoers were 35 or older, with 48% of the gross coming from premium large formats. It is also the highest-opening for a Spielberg and Amblin Entertainment original title not based on any previous IP. When analyzing the film's first weekend box office performance, David A. Gross from the box office newsletter FranchiseRe noted that international territories could help the lifetime gross of the film in the long run, saying, "Sci-fi thrillers do well abroad. These are visual stories that everyone understands."

In its second weekend, it came in second place and dropped 60%, earning $17 million domestically and $50 million internationally for a worldwide gross of $161 million. In its third weekend, it grossed $8.2 million, dropping 53%. The global gross of the film over the first two weeks is higher than the combined total of 2021's West Side Story's $76 million and 2022's The Fabelmans' $45.6 million, cementing Disclosure Day as Spielberg's highest-grossing film since 2018's Ready Player One, which grossed $607.9 million worldwide.

=== Critical response ===
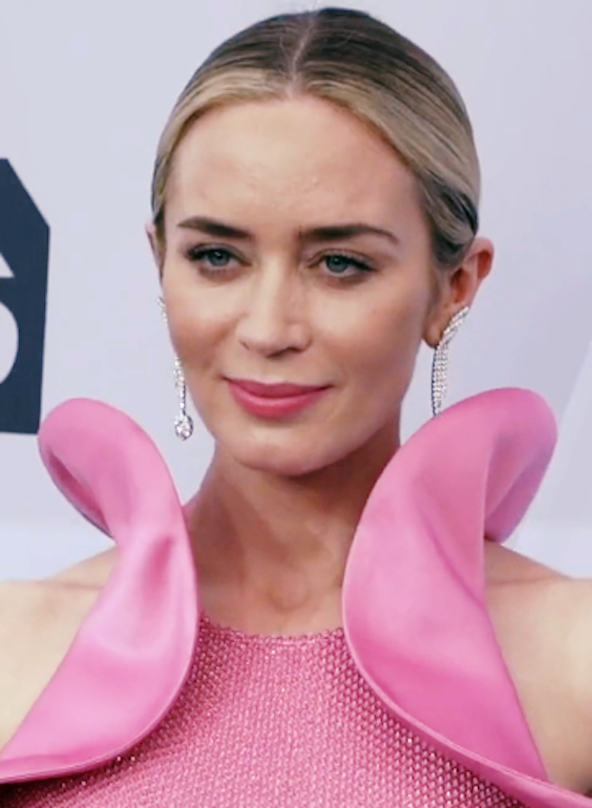
Emily Blunt's performance received acclaim, with many critics calling it the best of her career.

On the review aggregator website Rotten Tomatoes, 79% of 443 critics' reviews are positive with an average rating of 7.2/10. The website's critics consensus reads: "A humanistic variation on one of Steven Spielberg's most revisited themes, Disclosure Day's breathless pursuit of optimism in an age of conspiracy gets its biggest boost from career-highlight work by Emily Blunt." Metacritic, which uses a weighted average, assigned the film a score of 74 out of 100, based on 63 critics, indicating "generally favorable" reviews. Audiences polled by CinemaScore gave the film an average grade of "B" on an A+ to F scale, with PostTrak reporting that 61% of audiences say they would "definitely recommend" it.

The film received praise for Spielberg's direction, Blunt's performance, Williams' musical score, as well as the storytelling and visuals. Deadline Hollywood's Pete Hammond praised the film, writing that it "has so much more on its mind than just to entertain" and Spielberg "hasn't lost his own sense of wonder". Writing for Gizmodo, Germain Lussier called it a "sci-fi spectacle" in which Spielberg "puts the audience in the palm of his hand and takes us on an emotionally charged ride filled with mystery, excitement, spectacle, and meaning". David Ehrlich of IndieWire gave the film a B+ grade, writing that it "might be pitched as a spiritual sequel to Close Encounters, but the movie itself—typically earnest and fantastic entertainment, as fluid in its direction as it can be clumsy with its ideas—is in far more immediate conversation with Spielberg's recent films". The Hollywood Reporter's David Rooney called it "spellbinding" and "an essential addition to Spielberg's rich body of work", while also highly praising Blunt's performance as "simply breathtaking and never more magnetic".

The Guardian's Peter Bradshaw gave the film four out of five stars, writing that it is "never anything other than entertaining and grade-A fun; rare enough in the movies or anywhere else, rocketing along with barnstorming set-pieces, exhilarating chases, funny lines and a career-topper of a performance from Blunt". Owen Gleiberman of Variety called it a "vigorous and diverting ride", but felt that Spielberg "seems to be not so much leading as following the decades of lore and mythology—and gobbledygook" as the film does not reach "the contact high of awe that Close Encounters did". Francesca Steele of The i Paper lauded Blunt's performance and described Disclosure Day as a "giant, glorious blockbuster with a huge heart: despite its bleak outlook on global self-interest poisoning contemporary politics, it's deeply embedded with a very Spielbergian hopefulness for human empathy".

In a negative review, The Telegraph's Robbie Collin deemed the film "unquestionably a big swing" that "only glancingly connects", finding the plot "woolly and the tone a bungled mix of solemn and silly". For the BBC, Nicholas Barber also gave it a negative review, calling it "a flimsy, outdated car-chase thriller with no ideas about aliens that we haven't heard before". Amy Nicholson of the Los Angeles Times criticized the visual effects, writing that the "CG animals and aliens look stiff, other than a nifty close-up of an eyeball".

The performance of Courtney Grace, a former news anchor who plays the unnamed NBC anchorwoman in the final act of the film, received particular praise from critics and generated some of the most buzz online. (Note: Attributed to multiple references:) Grace admitted that she did not know how critical her role would be before watching the film for the first time at the U.S. premiere in New York City.

== Accolades ==
Award	Date of ceremony	Category	Recipient(s)	Result	Ref.
Astra Midseason Movie Awards	June 30, 2026	Best Picture	Disclosure Day	Nominated	
Astra Midseason Movie Awards	June 30, 2026	Best Actress	Emily Blunt	Runner-up	
Astra Midseason Movie Awards	June 30, 2026	Best Supporting Actress	Courtney Grace	Nominated	
Astra Midseason Movie Awards	June 30, 2026	Best Stunts	Disclosure Day	Nominated	
Camerimage	November 14, 2026	Golden Frog	Janusz Kamiński	Nominated	
Critics' Choice Super Awards	August 6, 2026	Best Science Fiction/Fantasy Movie	Disclosure Day	Nominated	
Critics' Choice Super Awards	August 6, 2026	Best Actress in a Science Fiction/Fantasy Movie	Emily Blunt	Won	
Golden Trailer Awards	May 28, 2026	Best Teaser	"Know" (Universal Pictures / Buddha Jones)	Nominated	
Golden Trailer Awards	May 28, 2026	Best Fantasy/Adventure	"World" (Universal Pictures / Buddha Jones)	Nominated	
Golden Trailer Awards	May 28, 2026	Best Summer 2026 Blockbuster Trailer	"Know" (Universal Pictures / Buddha Jones)	Won	
Grammy Awards	February 7, 2027	Best Instrumental Composition	"Listen..." by John Williams	Pending	
Hollywood Music in Media Awards	November 18, 2026	Best Original Score in a Sci-Fi/Fantasy Film	John Williams	Nominated	

== See also ==
- E.T. the Extra-Terrestrial, a 1982 Spielberg film featuring extraterrestrials and a UFO
- Project Blue Book, a former code name for the systematic study of UFOs by the U.S. Air Force
- Steven Spielberg Presents Taken, a 2002 Spielberg miniseries featuring government UFO cover-ups
- List of films featuring extraterrestrials
