= Him (TV series) =

Amazon miniseries

- Genre: Drama; Horror
- Written by: Paula Milne
- Directed by: Andy De Emmony
- Starring: Fionn Whitehead; Katherine Kelly; James Murray
- Country of origin: United Kingdom
- Original language: English
- No. of series: 1
- No. of episodes: 3

Production
- Producer: Chrissy Skinns
- Running time: 60 minutes
- Production company: Mainstreet Pictures

Original release
- Network: ITV
- Release: 19 October – 2 November 2016

HIM is an ITV drama miniseries, consisting of three 60-minute episodes. The series follows a boy referred to only as HIM (Fionn Whitehead) who discovers that he has telekinetic powers.

== Cast ==
- Fionn Whitehead as HIM
- James Murray as Edward, HIM's father.
- Katherine Kelly as Hannah, HIM's mother.
- Patrick Robinson as Victor, Hannah's new husband and HIM's step-father.
- Lucy Liemann as Beth, Edward's new wife and HIM's step-mother.
- Simona Brown as Faith, Victor's daughter and HIM's step-sister.
- Bobby Smalldridge as Jack, Hannah's son and HIM's step-brother.
- Susan Jameson as Rose, Edward's mother and HIM's grandmother.
- Alec Newman as Ross Brodie, HIM's psychiatrist.
- Angela Bruce as Fran, a nurse that looks after Rose.
- Mckell David as Jamie, HIM's friend.
- Aaron Phagura as Azfal, HIM's friend.
- Anastasia Hille as Magda Elliot, Professor of Psychic Research.

== Episodes ==
HIM aired in three sixty minute episodes. Filming began in suburban London in January 2016.

No.	Title	Directed by	Written by	Original release date
1	"Episode One"	Andy De Emmony	Paula Milne	19 October 2016
HIM moves in with his mother Hannah (Katherine Kelly), stepfather Victor (Patrick Robinson), and stepsister Faith (Simona Brown), and he and Faith soon become attracted to each other. He learns from his grandmother that his grandfather was also telekinetic, and she urges him to use his power as a force for good.
2	"Episode Two"	Andy De Emmony	Paula Milne	26 October 2016
Faith decides she shouldn't become romantically involved with HIM, and goes out on a date with one of HIM's friends. Enraged, HIM causes a serious accident, leaving his friend hospitalized in intensive care. HIM confesses to his psychiatrist, Ross Brodie, that he has telekinetic powers.
3	"Episode Three"	Andy De Emmony	Paula Milne	2 November 2016
Dr. Brodie refers HIM to Magda Elliott, a Professor of Psychic Research who verifies HIM's telekinetic powers. Elliott ultimately does not have HIM's best interests at heart and Ross decides she is not the person to help HIM find the answers he seeks. HIM leaves home, and a year later is using his powers to perform magic shows and seems contented and happier.
