= Educational Wealth Fund =

British educational charity

The Educational Wealth Fund (EWF) is a registered charity in England and Wales. The EWF is building a permanent endowment fund to provide grants to non-selective comprehensive schools in the United Kingdom.

== Overview ==
The EWF seeks to fund capital projects which provide schoolchildren, and their communities with a sense of awe, inspiration and wonder. It has five priority themes:

- Creative Arts
- Sustainability
- Local Culture
- Peace
- Mental Health

One of the stated aims of the EWF is to enhance the position of education within national culture, citing calls by UNESCO and the OECD on the vital need to improve globally the image and status of the teaching profession. The EWF notes that the highest performing education systems around the world are also supported by a national culture which prizes education and holds the teaching profession in high regard. To this end, the EWF seeks to raise the profile of education by funding projects which will create positive and inspiring stories about learning and teaching, such as; life-size dinosaur skeletons, wonderous libraries, art galleries, full-scale kitchen gardens, planetariums, world-class sculpture, landscaped gardens, music centres, and events involving renowned artists.

== History ==
The charity was founded in 2020 by British science teacher Jason West FRSA. Since publication of its vision the EWF has attracted wide support from economists, academics, authors, artists, TV and cultural personalities, including two former Presidents of the Royal Society. Jason cites that he was inspired by Carl Sagan's 1994 Pale Blue Dot speech given at Cornell University which questioned the futility of conflict, and humanities vision for its place on Earth.

== Notable patrons ==
Patron	Notable for
Professor Jim Al-Khalili FRS OBE	Theoretical physicist and TV Presenter
Beanie Bhebhe	Percussionist for Rudimental
Sir Ranulph Fiennes OBE	Explorer
Professor Ian Goldin	Director of the Oxford Martin Programme on Technological and Economic Change. Former Vice-President of the World Bank
Peter Horrocks CBE	Chair of SEMLEP and former director of the BBC World Service
Professor Saiful Islam FRSC	Chemist and Royal Institution Christmas Lecturer
Ian Kelly	Actor and Historical Biographer
Dame Ann Limb CBE, DL, FRSA	Chair of the Scout Association
Sir Paul Nurse FRS	Nobel Laureate, former president of the Royal Society, CEO Crick Institute.
Chris Packham CBE	Naturalist, TV presenter and author
Professor Martyn Percy	Dean of Christ Church, Oxford University
Sarah Pinborough	Novelist
Lord Martin Rees OM, FRS, FRAS	Astronomer Royal and former President of the Royal Society
Jacqueline de Rojas CBE	President of techUK and Chair of the Board of Digital Leaders. Non-Executive Director on the boards of Rightmove, Costain Group and FDM.
Professor Andrea Sella	Science communicator
Nicki Shields	Presenter Formula-E
Sir Tim Smit KBE	Founder of the Eden Project
Iain Standen FRSA	Chief Executive of Bletchley Park
KT Tunstall	Singer and Songwriter
John Wallace CBE	Former principal of the Royal Conservatoire of Scotland

== Administration ==
The EWFs founder, Jason West, was appointed by the board of trustees to become its first Chief Executive in July 2020. The Board of Trustees include: Sir Peter Birkett (Chair from 2020), Junita Fernandez, Lucian J Hudson, Zoe Raven, Andrew Harris, Victoria Mayes, Richard Bywater, Robert Gifford, Stuart Young and Chris Bridgman MBE. Youth Advisors include Amy and Ella Meek founders of Kids Against Plastic.
