= Indiana Jones and the Dial of Destiny (soundtrack) =

Indiana Jones and the Dial of Destiny (Original Motion Picture Soundtrack)

Film score by John Williams
- Released: June 29, 2023
- Recorded: June 28, 2022–February 10, 2023
- Studios: Sony Scoring Stage, Sony Pictures Studios, Culver City, California
- Genre: Film score
- Length: 1:07:06
- Label: Walt Disney
- Producers: John Williams; Bernhard Güttler

John Williams chronology
The Fabelmans (2022)	Indiana Jones and the Dial of Destiny (2023)	Disclosure Day (2026)

Singles from Indiana Jones and the Dial of Destiny (Original Motion Picture Soundtrack)
- 1. "Helena's Theme (For Violin and Orchestra)" Released: June 22, 2023

Indiana Jones and the Dial of Destiny (Original Motion Picture Soundtrack) is the film score to the 2023 film of the same name, composed by John Williams and orchestrated and conducted by Williams and William Ross. Recorded during June 2022 and February 2023 at the Sony Scoring Stage, and performed by the Hollywood Studio Symphony, the score was digitally released by Walt Disney Records on June 29, 2023, followed by a physical CD and vinyl LP release on August 9, 2023. A version of "Helena's Theme" for violin and orchestra, featuring Anne-Sophie Mutter as soloist, was released as a single on June 22, 2023.

== Background ==
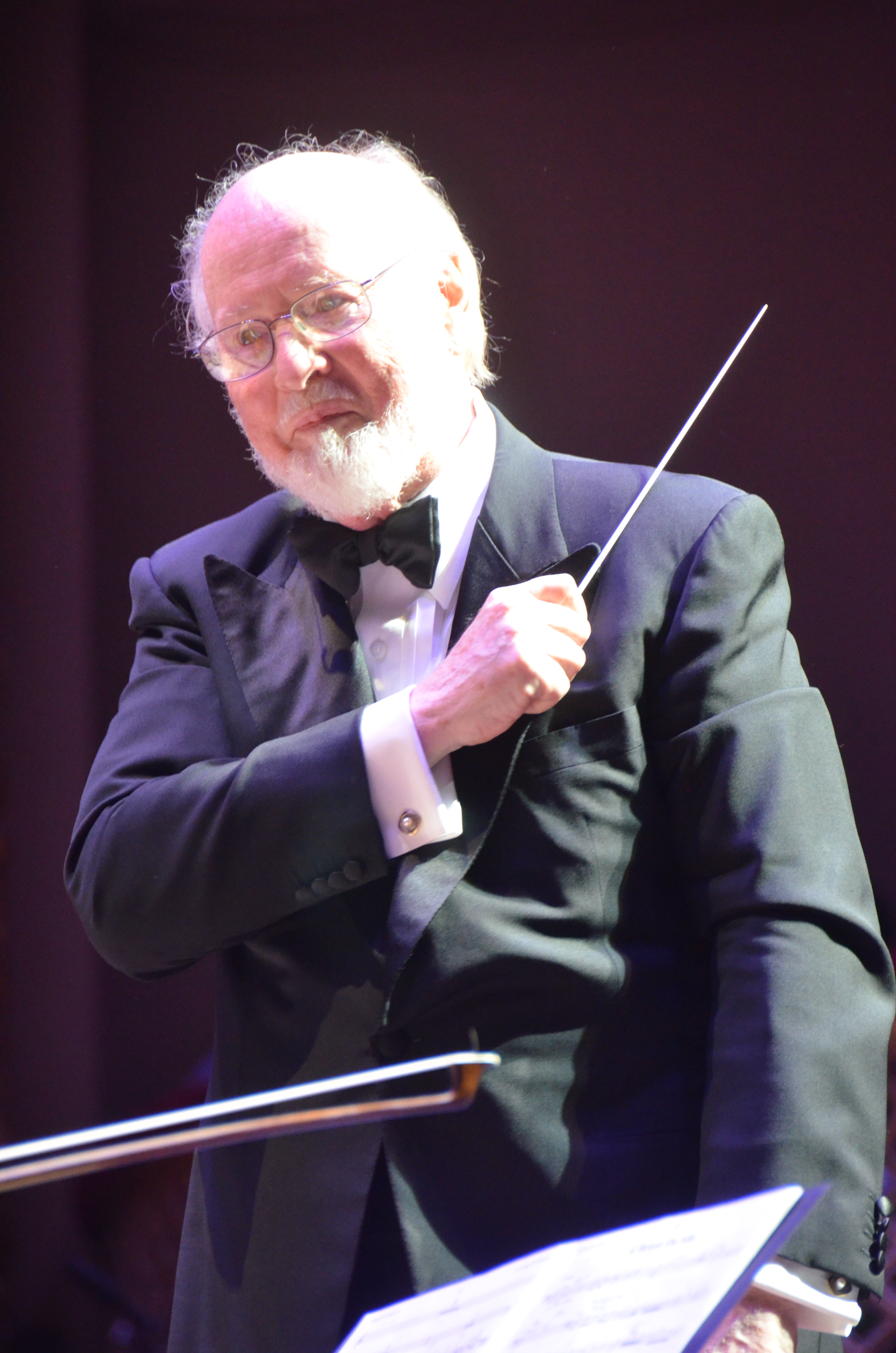
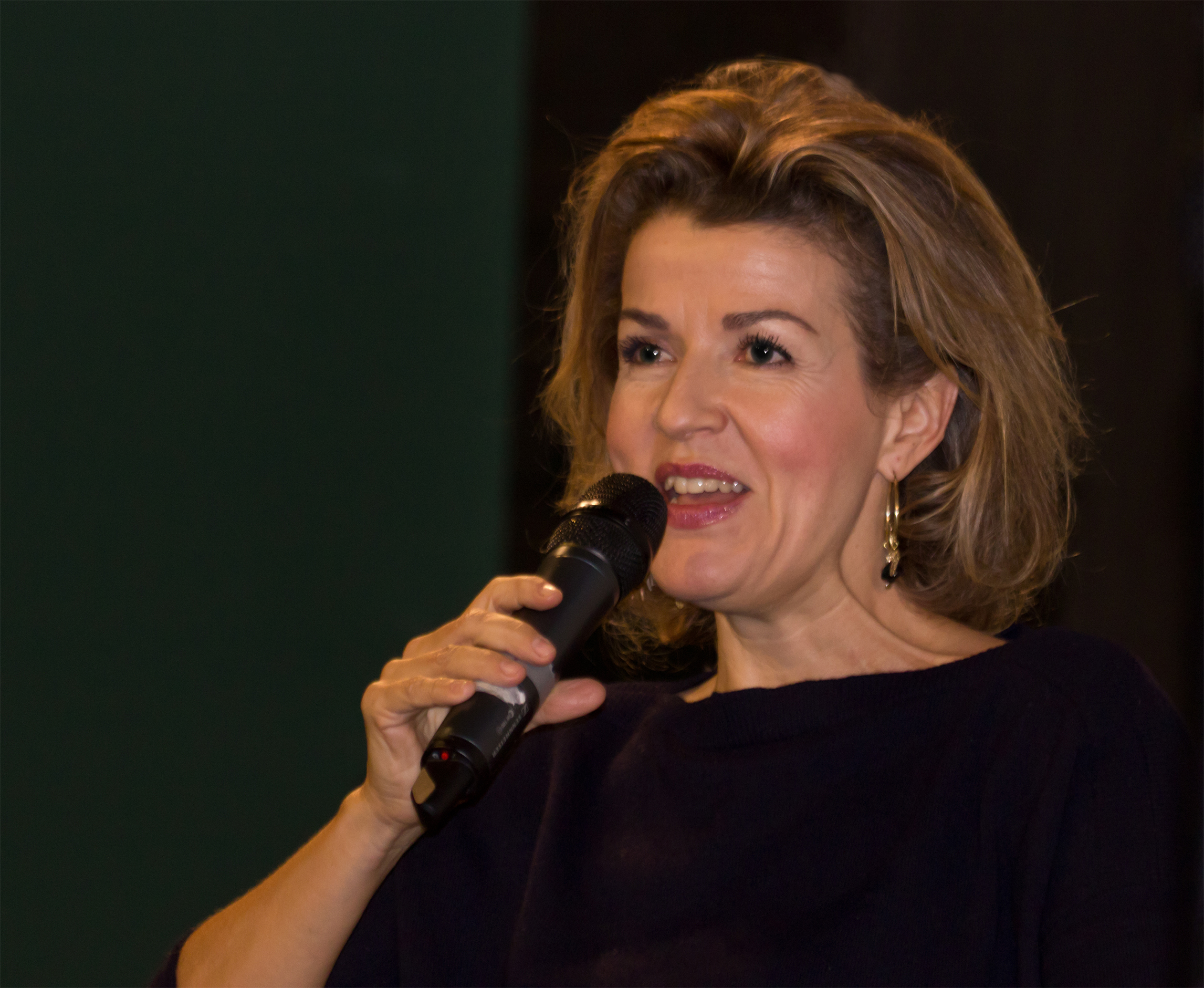
John Williams (left; 2011) returned to the franchise to compose the score for the film. The soundtrack album includes a second version of Williams's theme for the character Helena Shaw for violin and orchestra, featuring Anne-Sophie Mutter (right; 2019) as soloist.

In June 2016, Steven Spielberg confirmed that John Williams, who scored the previous films in the Indiana Jones franchise, would return to compose the music for the fifth film. The scoring began on June 28, 2022. The same month, Williams stated that it would be his final film score, following plans for a retirement, though he later backtracked on this decision. In an interview to The New York Times, director James Mangold, who collaborated with Williams for the first time in his career, recalled that he did not see Williams as "simply a genius of themes and tunes" - it was also Williams's "moment-to-moment scene work" which astounded him.

Mangold had written the basic sketches for the film in conjunction with the themes Williams had initially created. He insisted that Williams score the first reel in the edit as for a 1970s film, which he obliged as "the flow of the movie was falling off this cliff into Indy's current reality. And then he begins to gather himself, steel himself, and heads onto the road. By the time he and Phoebe [Waller-Bridge] are in full mode racing around Morocco with Mads Mikkelsen, the music found itself back and by the time they get out at sea, in Greece, it's full-on an Indiana Jones movie with an old Indy."

Williams wrote over 90 minutes of music for the film. The score includes reworked older themes from previous installments along with several new themes and motives representing individual characters, including a theme for the character Helena (Phoebe Waller-Bridge), and the titular Dial of Destiny. Williams also created a second version of "Helena's Theme" for violin and orchestra, featuring German violinist Anne-Sophie Mutter on the soundtrack album. On February 10, 2023, Williams confirmed that the score for Dial of Destiny has been completed.

== Live performances ==
At Mangold's request, Williams premiered "Helena's Theme" at the Hollywood Bowl on September 2, 2022.

"When John first played that theme for me, with the orchestra, I was wowed, of course [...] completely knocked over by the music. But I was also a bit nervous that it was just too much — too damned lush. Too romantic. John just smiled, gently, and let me babble, because I think he knew it was going to work beautifully."

— Mangold, on Williams' composition of "Helena's Theme"

On June 14, 2023, coinciding with the film's premiere in Dolby Theatre, Williams conducted an orchestral performance of several themes from the Indy franchise, including "Helena's Theme".

== Marketing and release ==
A two-minute featurette titled "The Final Score" debuted through social media platforms on June 20, 2023 to promote the film. On June 22, 2023, "Helena's Theme" for violin and orchestra was released as a single. The soundtrack was released digitally by Walt Disney Records on June 29, 2023, which was followed by a CD and vinyl LP release exclusively through Disney Music Emporium on August 9, 2023. On July 19, 2023, Disney Music Emporium announced that the CD, whose listing had been taken down from their online store some time before, was in fact a limited edition and had sold out while still in pre-orders before its release date. The CD was made available again in limited quantities beginning August 21, 2023.

Dial of Destiny's physical home media release on December 5, 2023 included an exclusive "music-only" version featuring the complete score from every single scene of the film without any dialogue or sound effects. This version features previously unreleased music not included on the official soundtrack album, including a cue titled "Pulse of the City" by William Ross, but the film's presentation of the score is heavily edited and does not always reflect the original form of Williams' compositions.

== Reception ==
Williams' score was well received, with critics calling it "fabulous", "memorable" and "joyful". Patrick Gibbs of Slug Magazine wrote, "While John Williams' score is even more of a cut and paste of previous works than his recent Star Wars soundtracks, it still elicits excitement merely by evoking the old themes." Rachel Labonte of Screen Rant complimented Williams' score as "sweeping and epic as one would expect, eliciting chills from the first moment his iconic theme is heard". Adam Nayman of The Ringer wrote "no matter how loud the soundtrack gets, there's less at stake. Even the brief burst of John Williams's triumphal theme at a key moment feels ersatz: an echo of glory days that Mangold and his army of skilled, detail-oriented craftspeople can only chase." Tim Grierson of Screen International called it "a score that reprises memorable themes". Christian Clemmensen of Filmtracks praised the score's "smart interpolations" of its themes and how it overall extended "the quality of the prior two works [of the franchise] and continues to espouse the uniquely superior aspects of Williams's writing from decades past." Jonathan Broxton of Movie Music UK similarly praised the score as "an outstanding work", writing that "even when you take nostalgia out of the equation and try to assess it objectively, it still succeeds on multiple levels."

In December 2023, the score was shortlisted for Best Original Score at the 96th Academy Awards.

At the 2024 Grammy Awards, Helena's Theme won the Grammy for Best Instrumental Composition.

== Track listing ==
All tracks are written by John Williams.

No.	Title	Length
1.	"Prologue to Indiana Jones and the Dial of Destiny"	6:00
2.	"Helena's Theme"	3:30
3.	"Germany, 1944 (Contains Raiders March)"	4:42
4.	"To Morocco (Contains Raiders March)"	3:21
5.	"Voller Returns"	3:06
6.	"Auction At Hotel L'Atlantique"	2:58
7.	"Tuk Tuk In Tangiers"	3:35
8.	"To Athens (Contains Raiders March)"	2:17
9.	"Perils of the Deep"	2:31
10.	"Water Ballet"	4:53
11.	"Polybius Cipher (Contains Raiders March)"	2:39
12.	"The Grafikos (Contains Raiders March)"	4:39
13.	"Archimedes' Tomb"	3:01
14.	"The Airport"	4:46
15.	"Battle of Syracuse"	2:50
16.	"Centuries Join Hands (Contains Raiders March)"	3:02
17.	"New York, 1969 (Contains Raiders March)"	4:17
18.	"Helena's Theme (for Violin and Orchestra)" (feat. Anne-Sophie Mutter)	4:59
Total length:		1:07:06

== Charts ==
Chart performance for Indiana Jones and the Dial of Destiny (Original Motion Picture Soundtrack)
Chart (2023–2026)	Peak position
French Physical Albums (SNEP)	186
UK Album Downloads (Official Charts)	36
UK Soundtrack Albums (Official Charts)	9
US Top Classical Albums (Billboard)	5
US Top Classical Crossover Albums (Billboard)	1
