= Sarah Pinborough =

British writer (born 1972)

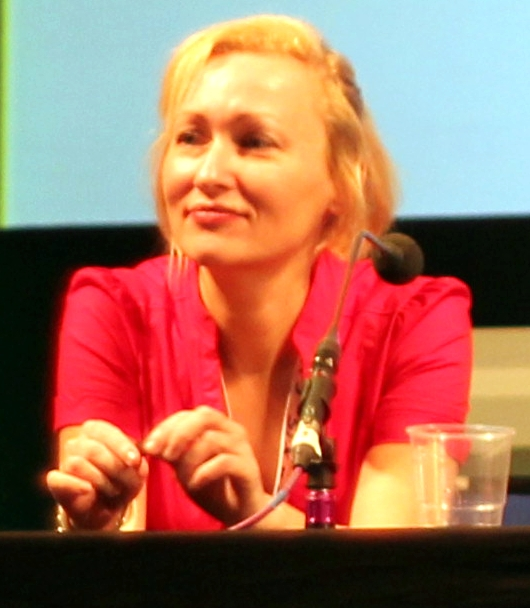
- Born: 1972 (age 53–54); Milton Keynes, England
- Occupations: Writer, teacher
- Writing career
- Pen name: Sarah Silverwood
- Genres: fantasy, young adult Influences Stephen King; James Herbert
- Website: www.sarahpinborough.com Publisher Leisure Books; Gollancz Books; HarperFiction; Random House; Ace Books

Sarah Pinborough is an English author and screenwriter of over 20 YA and adult works. She is known for her thriller, fantasy and cross-genre novels.

== Biography ==
Pinborough was born in Buckinghamshire, England, in 1972. Her father was a diplomat, and as a child she moved between various countries, including Syria, India, the Sudan, and Russia. After ten years at boarding school in England, she tried several different jobs before becoming a secondary school teacher. She taught for six years before becoming a full-time writer.

Her first publication was a horror story entitled Express Delivery’ in 2001. She began writing novels, and six of these were published by Leisure Books. Moving away from horror, Pinborough then published the trilogy The Dog-Faced Gods (2010-12).

As Sarah Silverwood she penned the Nowhere Chronicles young adult series.

Pinbrough rose to prominence in 2017 with the cross-genre thriller Behind Her Eyes, which was adapted as a limited series for Netflix in 2021.

== Bibliography ==
=== Novels ===
==== Leisure Books ====
Her work has been published within the horror books section of Leisure Books.

- The Hidden (2004, Leisure Books) ISBN 978-0843954807 — amnesia is the start of a new life with hidden horrors
- The Reckoning (2005, Leisure Books) ISBN 978-0843955507 — horrors from teenage years come back to a group of adult friends
- Breeding Ground (2006, Leisure Books) ISBN 978-0843957419 — end-of-the world novel where most of the population is wiped out by giant spiders born of human women
- The Taken (2007, Leisure Books) ISBN 978-0843958966 — ghostly revenge novel
- Tower Hill (2008, Leisure Books) ISBN 978-0-8439-6052-5 — about a small town in America in supernatural peril of Biblical proportions
- Feeding Ground (2009, Leisure Books) ISBN 0843962933 — sequel to Breeding Ground; Pinborough's original proposal for this sequel would have been called The Brethren but this was rejected by the publisher as being too much like science fiction for their list. The book as written is intended to be like a "creature feature" movie.

==== Torchwood ====
Torchwood is a spin-off series from the BBC series Doctor Who. These are TV tie-in novels and short stories in that shared world.

- Into the Silence (Torchwood) (2009, Random House) ISBN 978-1846077531
- The story Kaleidoscope in Consequences (Torchwood) (2009, Random House) ISBN 978-1846077845
- Torchwood: Long Time Dead (2011, Random House) ISBN 978-1849902847

Pinborough has also written short stories for the Torchwood Magazine. These are:

- Happy New Year Issue 20
- Mend Me Issue 23

==== The Dog-Faced Gods series ====
Published as the Forgotten Gods Trilogy in the US by Ace Books.

"The 'Dog Faced Gods' series is set in an alternative world. The Britain of this world isn't a dystopia but it is merely a little crappier and harsher than ours." Jim Steel

1. A Matter of Blood (2010, Gollancz Books) (2013 Ace Books) ISBN 978-0425258460
2. The Shadow of the Soul (2011, Gollancz Books) (2013 Ace Books) ISBN 978-0425258484
3. The Chosen Seed (2012, Gollancz Books) (2013 Ace Books) ISBN 978-0425258507

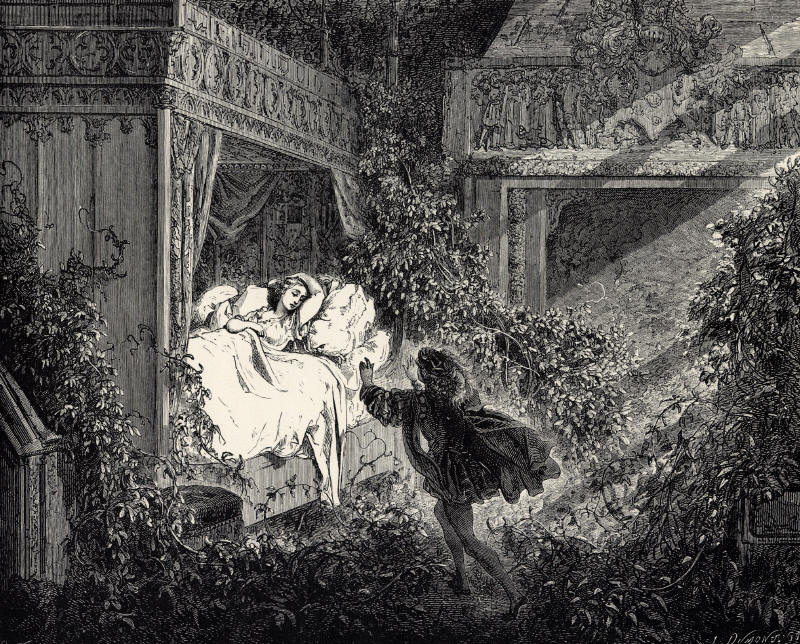
Sleeping Beauty by Gustave Dore

==== The Fairy Tale Series ====
Subversive retellings of fairy stories published by Gollancz Books.

- Poison (April 2013 Gollancz Books) ISBN 978-0575092976 — a Snow White story
- Charm (July 2013 Gollancz Books) ISBN 978-0575093010 — a Cinderella story
- Beauty (October 2013 Gollancz Books) ISBN 978-0575093058 — a Sleeping Beauty story

==== Other novels ====
- The Language of Dying (2009, PS Publishing) (2013, Jo Fletcher Books) ISBN 978-1782067542 — a dysfunctional family is revealed around the father's death-bed
- Mayhem (2013, Jo Fletcher Books) ISBN 978-1780871288 — a supernatural murder mystery set in Victorian London and based around the events of the Thames Torso Murders.
- Murder (2013, Jo Fletcher Books) ISBN 978-1780872346 — a sequel to Mayhem
- The Death House (2015, Gollancz) ISBN 978-0575096875 — bleak lives of children with a 'Defective gene'

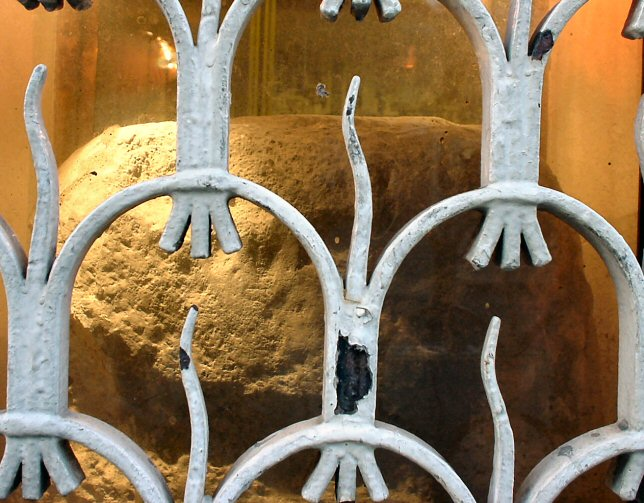
The London Stone

- 13 Minutes (2016, Flatiron Books) ISBN 1250123879 — 'young adult' thriller following a girl being rescued from an icy river
- Behind Her Eyes (2017, HarperCollins) ISBN 978-0008131968 — an idyllic life suddenly changes and who can be trusted?
- Cross Her Heart (2018, William Morrow & Co) ISBN 9780062856791 — psychological thriller about a liar and truth
- Dead To Her (2020, HarperCollins) ISBN 978-0062856821 — crime thriller involving an outsider marrying into elite society
- Insomnia (2022, William Morrow & Co) ISBN 978-0062856845 — psychological thriller about a successful lawyer approaching her 40th birthday

=== As Sarah Silverwood ===
Sarah Pinborough first published The Nowhere Chronicles, a YA urban fantasy trilogy set across multiple parallel world versions of London, under the pseudonym Sarah Silverwood. The series has since been reissued under the name Sarah Pinborough.

==== The Nowhere Chronicles ====
1. The Double-edged Sword (2010, Gollancz) ISBN 978-1780620596
2. The Traitor's Gate (2011, Gollancz) ISBN 978-1780620657
3. The London Stone (2012, Gollancz) ISBN 978-1780620671

=== Short stories ===
- Waiting For October (2007, Dark Arts Books) – a book of the combined short stories of Sarah Pinborough, Adam Pepper, Jeff Strand and Jeffrey Thomas (writer) ISBN 978-0977968619
- Hellbound Hearts (2009, Pocket Books) edited by Paul Kane (writer) and Marie O'Regan – Pinborough contributed "The Confessor's Tale" ISBN 978-1439140901
- Zombie Apocalypse! edited by Stephen Jones (author) (2010, Running Press) – Pinborough contributed "Diary Entry #1", "Diary Entry #2" and "Diary Entry #3" ISBN 978-0762440016
- The Compartments of Hell written with Paul Meloy in Black Static. A post apocalypse story where the only survivors are those who are high on opiates.
- The Room Upstairs in House of Fear, an anthology of Haunted House stories edited by Jonathan Oliver (publishing), (2011 Solaris Books) ISBN 978-1-907992-06-3

=== Adaptations ===
Several of her novels have been optioned or adapted for TV or film. This includes:

- In 2012, it was announced that director Peter Medak had been attached to direct Cracked, a screenplay based on Pinborough's first novel The Hidden but it has not been aired.
- The Forgotten Gods/Dog-Faced Gods Trilogy was optioned for a television series in 2014 but has not been aired.
- Her teenage thriller, 13 Minutes was bought by Netflix in 2016, with Josh Schwartz and Stephanie Savage writing the adaptation.
- Netflix developed a limited series based on Pinborough's psychological thriller novel Behind Her Eyes. The series premiered on 17 February 2021.

== Screenwriting ==
Pinborough has written for the BBC and several other television companies. In 2012, Pinborough wrote Old School Ties, the second episode of the ninth series of the BBC TV crime drama New Tricks. On Dec 4, 2023, it was announced that Pinborough will adapt her Dog Faced Gods novels to television for Red Planet Pictures. In 2024, Paramount+ will release Insomnia, starring Vicky McClure.

Other projects in various stages of development include:

- M (2013) World Productions/ITV Global Returnable Drama Series.
- Fallow Ground (2012) World Productions Original 3-part drama.
- Red Summer (2012) Blind Monkey Pictures Feature screenplay. Under option.

== Personal life ==
Pinborough was born in 1972 in Buckinghamshire, UK.

She is a patron of the Educational Wealth Fund.
