= Kevin Ryan (actor) =

Irish actor (born 1984)

- Born: Kevin John Ryan; 20 June 1984 (age 42); Dublin, Ireland
- Other names: Kevin J. Ryan, Kev Ryan
- Occupation: Actor
- Years active: 2006–present
- Height: 5 ft 10 in (1.78 m)
- Spouse: Dedee Pfeiffer (m. 2009; div. 2012)

Kevin John Ryan (born 20 June 1984) is an Irish actor, known for his television roles in the TV series Copper and Crossbones.

== Early life ==
Ryan was born in Dublin, Ireland, He comes from a family of stonecutters, as a young man, Ryan completed a stonecutting apprenticeship, but his own interests were in the dramatic arts. He attended Terenure College.

== Career ==
Initially, Ryan was a professional dancer, but decided to pursue acting. He moved to Hollywood, where he trained in the Stanislavski system of method acting. His most notable roles are Francis Maguire in Copper, Finnegan in Crossbones and Patrick Ryan in Guilt. He also played John Pitcairn in History Channel's show “Sons of Liberty”

== Personal life ==
Ryan was married to Dedee Pfeiffer from 2009 to 2012.

== Filmography ==
Year	Title	Role	Notes
2006	The Fast and the Furious: Tokyo Drift	Bully	Uncredited
2006	Entourage	Ed Thomas	TV series – Episode: "Aquamom" (scenes deleted, as Kevin J. Ryan)
2007	Young Folks	Steve	Short film (as Kevin J. Ryan)
2008	Days of Our Lives	Sean	TV series – Two episodes (as Kevin J. Ryan)
2008	Greg and Emilia	Carter	Short film (as Kevin J. Ryan)
2009	The Tub	n/a	Short film (as Kevin J. Ryan)
2009	Laredo	Charlie	Short film (as Kevin J. Ryan)
2010	Life-ers		TV movie (as Kevin J. Ryan)
2010	ForePlay: The Movie	Evan	Short film (as Kevin J. Ryan)
2011	Tumbling	Steven	Short film (as Kevin J. Ryan)
2011	1 Nighter	Gerry	Short film (as Kevin J. Ryan)
2012	Raw	Chris	TV series (as Kevin J. Ryan)
2012	Songs For Amy	J.J. Fitzgerald	Independent film (as Kevin J. Ryan)
2012	Paddy's in the Boot	Connor Quinn	Short film (as Kevin J. Ryan)
2012–2013	Copper	Detective Francis Maguire	TV series
2014	Crossbones	John Finnegan	TV series
2014	The Guru & the Gypsy	Ben	Film (as Kevin J. Ryan) (post-production)
2015	Sons of Liberty	John Pitcairn	miniseries
2016	Guilt	Patrick Ryan	TV series
2017	Once Upon a Time	Robert	TV series

== Awards ==
Ryan was voted one of Ireland's sexiest Irish men (he was voted #70 in Social & Personal's sexiest Irish men in 2008 and voted #59 in 2009).
