= Guilt (American TV series) =

2016 television series

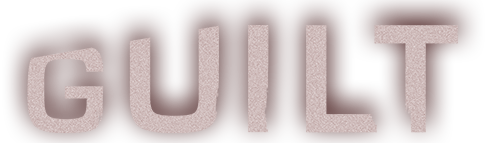
- Genre: Mystery; Thriller; Drama
- Created by: Kathryn Price; Nichole Millard
- Starring: Daisy Head; Emily Tremaine; Cristian Solimeno; Naomi Ryan; Simona Brown; Zachary Fall; Kevin Ryan; Sam Cassidy; Billy Zane
- Country of origin: United States
- Original language: English
- No. of seasons: 1
- No. of episodes: 10

Production
- Executive producers: Kathryn Price; Nichole Millard; Todd Slavkin; Darren Swimmer; Stephen McPherson
- Production companies: Wonder Monkey; Lionsgate Television

Original release
- Network: Freeform
- Release: June 13 – August 22, 2016

Guilt is an American mystery drama television series that premiered on Freeform on June 13, 2016. The series was created by Kathryn Price and Nichole Millard, and produced by Lionsgate Television. Freeform gave a pilot order in June 2015, and picked the show up to series in November 2015. On October 20, 2016, Freeform announced they had canceled the series after one season.

Daisy Head stars as Grace Atwood, an American student in London whose roommate, Molly Ryan, is murdered. As people begin suspecting her, they start to accuse her of the crime. The show features an ensemble cast with Head as Grace Atwood, Emily Tremaine as Grace's sister, Billy Zane as the defense lawyer hired to protect Grace, Cristian Solimeno and Naomi Ryan as two members of the police, Sam Cassidy as a member of the British royal family, Simona Brown and Zachary Fall as acquaintances of Grace, and Kevin Ryan as Molly Ryan's brother.

== Plot ==
Young student Grace Atwood finds herself in a mess when her best friend, Molly Ryan, is murdered, and she becomes the prime suspect of the crime. Grace's sister, Natalie, is beside her at all costs, but does not know whether to believe what Grace says. While the London police investigate the murder, members of the high-end sex club Courtenay continue to practice their explicit and secret nights of sex with prostitutes. There are many suspected of having murdered Molly, but, in all that time, was Grace guilty of the murder, or she was just a young lady caught in the journalistic spotlight and the hard investigation regime?

== Cast and characters ==
=== Main ===
- Daisy Head as Grace Atwood: An American college student living in London who is accused of murder after her roommate Molly is found dead in their flat.
- Emily Tremaine as Natalie Atwood: An Assistant District Attorney from Boston who flies to London to support Grace after learning her younger sister is implicated in Molly's murder.
- Cristian Solimeno as D.S. Alex Bruno: The one who leads the Molly Ryan murder case. He also begins to develop feelings for Natalie Atwood.
- Naomi Ryan as Gwendolyn "Gwen" Hall: A Crown Prosecutor assigned to the Molly Ryan case who had a previous sexual relationship with D.S. Bruno.
- Simona Brown as Roz Walters: An up-and-coming British DJ living with Grace and Molly who lives a double life as a worker at a high-end sex club.
- Zachary Fall as Luc Pascal: A drug-addicted artist and Grace's boyfriend who becomes a prime suspect in Molly's murder.
- Kevin Ryan as Patrick Ryan: Molly's older brother who wants retribution for his sister's death.
- Sam Cassidy as Prince Theo: A member of the British royal family and a client of high-end sex clubs who shares a personal connection with Molly.
- Billy Zane as Stan Gutterie: A lawyer who is hired by James (Grace's and Natalie's step father) to help Grace.

=== Recurring and guest ===
- Robbie Gee as Pike: A Detective Chief Inspector who is involved in Molly Ryan's case, and a best friend to Alex.
- Amber Jean Rowan as Kaley: A young Irish girl, who became a prostitute at the Courtenay sex-club and was Roz's lover before she quit the sex club and fell in love with Patrick.
- Osi Okerafor as Phillip Baker: The right-hand man to Prince Theo and the one responsible for covering up the Prince's tracks in Molly's murder scene.
- Sujaya Dasgupta as Veena Patel: An aspiring, smart and elegant journalist who does everything to get attention for her career.
- Rebekah Wainwright as Molly Ryan: A college student who was murdered in the flat where she lived with her two best friends, Roz and Grace. Molly was involved with Professor Geoffrey Linley, and was an enemy of Geoffrey's wife, Beatrice. Molly also worked as a prostitute at the Courtenay sex-club before her death. She was pregnant of Prince Theo when she was murdered. It is revealed that Luc Pascal is her killer.
- Katie Clarkson-Hill as Charlotte Crockleby: Prince Theo's soon-to-be wife who discovers that the Prince is involved with prostitutes.
- Anthony Head as James: Grace's and Natalie's step father who was involved with the Russian mafia.
- Ryan Gerald as Neville Harris: A young man who lived in the building next door to Molly and Grace and was stalking Molly. Neville has a mental illness and is hospitalized in a nursing home when he tries to hurt Grace. However, Neville later becomes a witness to what happened to Molly.
- Michael Lindall as Finch: One of those responsible for maintaining the Courtenay sex-club hidden and private.
- Jonathan Howard as Josh: A police officer who was responsible for carrying over Grace when she was accused of killing Molly. He briefly helped Grace to flee, but was stopped when she gave up and the two had a car accident.
- Mark Letheren as Professor Geoffrey Linley: A teacher at Grace's and Molly's university who was sexually involved with both of them.
- Sam O'Mahony as Declan Ryan: A member of Molly's and Patrick's family who helped Patrick to undermine the prince.
- Emma Davies as Beatrice Linley: Geoffrey's wife who discovered his involvement with students, and who later killed him.

== Episodes ==
No.	Title	Directed by	Written by	Original release date	US viewers (millions)
1	"Pilot"	Gary Fleder	Kathryn Price & Nichole Millard	June 13, 2016	0.49
After a crazy night full of drugs and alcohol organized by Grace Atwood and Molly Ryan in their apartment. The next day, Grace and her boyfriend Luc and Roz have the lifeless body of Molly on the floor with multiple stabs and blood splashed everywhere. After investigating the murder scene, traces of Molly's blood were found on Grace's feet, making her a prime suspect in the case. So D.S. Bruno, the lead detective in Molly's case and associate D.I. Pike bring Grace in for questioning. Gwendolyn Hall, the crown prosecutor on the case, watches over the cops as they question Grace on the whereabouts of Molly's cell phone. She says that Molly lost him in Diablo, the nightclub they had visited the night of Molly's murder. Grace tells them that Molly thought she was being watched. Afterwards, Bruno is confronted by Gwendolyn who thinks he was too soft with Grace and that he should have questioned her further about the traces of blood on her feet. Bruno explains that there is insufficient evidence to warrant an arrest, so Gwendolyn reluctantly agrees that Grace should be released. Natalie, Grace's older sister, who is an assistant prosecutor, decides to fly to London after being called by Grace and told about Molly's death. The cops discovers that Molly was pregnant and quickly concludes that this could have been a motive for the murder. But with the father unknown, the cops must work on getting a DNA sample. Luc decides to take Grace to Paris with him for a few days. But not long after their attempted departure, the cops ambush Grace and Luc's train in search of the couple, their attempt to move them straight to the top of the suspects list. Suspicions are roused even further when a video of Molly giving Luc to lap-dance surfaces. Grace and Natalie's stepfather, James Lahue, hires the best but controversial defense attorney, Stan Gutterie to defend her. Natalie does not agree and suspects that James and Molly had a relationship. Back to the crime scene, Bruno and Pike discover that a stuffed monkey belonging to Molly had been taken from the crime scene and they begin to question whether Grace was in fact telling the truth about Molly's stalker. But it's not long before Grace is back in the limelight when a video of her slashing the tires of Linley's wife's car resurfaces. She claims that she did not know Linley was married when she got her, but the jealous and violent streak in her personality leaves Natalie questioning whether her sister is innocent after all.
2	"American Psycho"	Gary Fleder	Kathryn Price & Nichole Millard	June 20, 2016	0.33
Stan does everything in his power to find the blackmailer when a video of Grace attacking Molly goes viral; Natalie becomes suspicious of her stepfather James when he arrives in London only to start acting suspicious; and Molly's brother Patrick sets out to avenge her death.
3	"Exit Wounds"	Larry Shaw	Nelson Soler	June 27, 2016	0.33
Grace spirals into a depression after reading hateful remarks about herself online; Det.Bruno investigates the shootings at Prof. Linley's cottage; and Prince Theo worries his connection to Molly will become public. Meanwhile, Stan tries to help Grace's stepfather after he's blackmailed with incriminating photos.
4	"Blood Ties"	Larry Shaw	Shaina Fewell	July 11, 2016	0.25
Gwendolyn's possible bias is uncovered by Natalie. Meanwhile, a past indiscretion haunts Det. Bruno; Grace asks Luc to proceed with his art show; and Natalie and Det. Bruno can't help but recognize their intensifying chemistry.
5	"The Eye of the Needle"	Elizabeth Allen Rosenbaum	Todd Slavkin & Darren Swimmer	July 18, 2016	0.29
Grace is rescued from the paparazzi by a Good Samaritan who may have ulterior motives. Meanwhile, Natalie and Det. Bruno search for Grace; and Patrick goes undercover to learn more about his sister and her murderer.
6	"A Simple Plan"	Elizabeth Allen Rosenbaum	Elle Triedman	July 25, 2016	0.30
Gwen desperately searches for evidence to link Grace to Molly's murder; Luc is on lockdown at the police station; Stan works to get Luc released; Det. Bruno discovers shocking information; and Grace teams up with Roz to put attention on another suspect. Meanwhile, Natalie's sent to distract Finch; Kaley finds it difficult to deny her attraction to Patrick; and Charlotte becomes suspicious of Prince Theo after he's caught in a lie.
7	"A Fall from Grace"	Mairzee Almas	Fredrick Kotto	August 1, 2016	0.34
After Grace is arrested, Natalie begins to suspect her sister to be Molly's killer; Charlotte buys a dog for Prince Theo in the hopes that he will tell her the truth about who Molly is while Kaley discovers the identity of Gentlemen 33; Neville claims to have seen Theo standing over Molly's corpse with a bloody knife the night she was killed.
8	"Eyes Wide Open"	Mairzee Almas	Bryan Q. Miller	August 8, 2016	0.31
When Grace undergoes hypnosis under Stan's suggestion, she recalls the night Molly was killed and realizes she didn't kill her; Charlotte threatens to expose Theo; Neville's mother wants Natalie to stay away from her son; Neville's information leads Bruno to decide to testify against Theo despite the prince's threats; Kaley gives up her life of prostitution and Roz moves in with Luc.
9	"The Crown v Atwood"	Larry Shaw	Todd Slavkin & Darren Swimmer	August 15, 2016	0.30
Stan and Gwen face off in the courtroom as the Grace case finally begins. Natalie and Bruno try to find new evidence to prove Grace's innocence before it's too late, and Grace pursues another way of gaining her freedom.
10	"What Did You Do?"	Larry Shaw	Kathryn Price & Nichole Millard	August 22, 2016	0.40
The crown prosecutor is convinced Grace Atwood killed her flatmate Molly Ryan and now it's in the hands of the jury. As the jury deliberates Grace's fate, Detectives Bruno and Pike rush to uncover who is behind the Hertfordshire murder and if the two cases are related. To buy time, Stan and Natalie try and postpone the court proceedings, not knowing that Grace has an escape plan of her own in motion. Some revelations are made, and, in the end, someone is victim of a sudden killer.

== Reception ==
On Rotten Tomatoes, the series holds a 60% approval rating based on 10 critics. The site's critical consensus reads: "Guilt stumbles through over-packed twists, weak dialogue, and unrealistic behavior, yet ultimately emerges as a fun, sensationalized soap". On Metacritic, the first season of the show holds a 52 out of 100 score based on 8 reviews, indicating "mixed or average reviews".
