= Crossbones (TV series) =

- Title card
- Genre: Drama; Adventure
- Created by: Neil Cross; James V. Hart; Amanda Welles
- Based on: The Republic of Pirates by Colin Woodard
- Starring: John Malkovich; Richard Coyle; Claire Foy; Yasmine Al Masri; David Hoflin; Chris Perfetti; Tracy Ifeachor
- Composer: Mateo Messina
- Country of origin: United States
- Original language: English
- No. of seasons: 1
- No. of episodes: 9

Production
- Executive producers: Neil Cross; Ciaran Donnelly; Ted Gold; Laurie MacDonald; Walter F. Parkes
- Producers: Rudd Simmons; Jane Bartelme; Tim Dragga
- Production locations: Puerto Rico; New York City; Louisiana
- Cinematography: Christopher J. Baffa
- Editors: Art Jones; Tim Streeto; Margaret Reticker
- Production companies: P+M Image Nation; Mr. Cross; Universal Television

Original release
- Network: NBC
- Release: May 30 – August 2, 2014

Crossbones is an American action-adventure drama television series that aired on the NBC network from May 30 to August 2, 2014. The series is a fictionalization of the life of the pirate Edward "Blackbeard" Teach, who is secretly alive in 1729 (historically, he died in 1718). The show was created by Neil Cross, James V. Hart, and Amanda Welles. Crossbones is based on Colin Woodard's book The Republic of Pirates.

The show was originally supposed to be a part of NBC's midseason schedule, but it was later pushed to summer. The series premiered on May 30, 2014, at 10:00 pm EDT. On July 24, 2014, NBC announced that Crossbones had been canceled, and the final two episodes were removed from the schedule. However, both episodes were later aired on August 2, 2014.

== Plot ==
In 1729, the island of Santa Compaña is home to pirates, thieves, and cutthroats all ruled by the feared pirate captain Edward "Blackbeard" Teach, who the British Empire believes is dead, but who in actuality is merely in hiding. Calling himself "Commodore", he now uses this island as his base of operations.

According to the first episode:

At its height, the British Empire was the most powerful force humanity had ever known. Fully 1/5 of the world's population lived and died under the British flag. Yet its true power was not on land but on the sea where they ruled with the most brutal and efficient military force that has ever been: the British Navy. But the oceans that this navy sought to control were vast, unknowable and full of terrible danger. And for all the Crown's might, its ships were often lost to starvation, to storm and tempest, and to pirates. So it was in 1712, the Crown offered a prince's fortune to whoever could create a device that would allow its navy to navigate this great emptiness with a precision never before known. With this device, the Empire would increase its dominion over the world. But without it, the ships of the Crown would continue to be easy prey, not only from the gods and monsters of legend, but from a monster far more brutal and far more real.

== Cast ==
=== Main ===
- John Malkovich as Edward "Blackbeard" Teach
- Richard Coyle as Tom Lowe
- Claire Foy as Kate Balfour
- Yasmine Al Massri as Selima El Sharad
- David Hoflin as Charles Rider
- Chris Perfetti as Tim Fletch
- Tracy Ifeachor as Nenna Ajanlekoko

=== Recurring ===
- Peter Stebbings as James Balfour
- Julian Sands as William Jagger
- Ezra Buzzington as Oswald Eisengrim
- Henry Hereford as Frederick Nightingale
- Lauren Shaw as The Woman in White/Antoinette
- Emilien De Falco as Alain Mersault
- Kevin Ryan as John Finnegan
- Natalie Blair as Rose Dryden
- Aimee Mullins as The Women in White/Antoinette
- Henry Hereford as The Wild Man
- Marisé Alvarez as Nelly
- Ricardo Hinoa as Anignatius Locke
- Francis Rosas as Governor Fernando de Portocarrero

== Episodes ==
No.	Title	Directed by	Written by	Original release date	US viewers (millions)
1	"The Devil's Dominion"	David Slade	Neil Cross and James V. Hart & Amanda Welles	May 30, 2014	4.91
Tom Lowe, a British spy, receives a new mission from his commander William Jagger—kill the "Commodore", who is supposedly the notorious pirate Edward Teach, better known as "Blackbeard" in his secret headquarters on the island of Santa Campana. According to Jagger, the man he killed eleven years earlier at Ocracoke was not the real Blackbeard but a double. Lowe poses as a surgeon aboard HMS Petrel, a ship bound for England that is attacked by pirates looking to steal a prototype of an important navigation device called the longitude chronometer and its inventor Frederick Nightingale (Henry Hereford).
2	"The Covenant"	Ciaran Donnelly	Blake Masters	June 6, 2014	3.64
Blackbeard invites his ally, Captain Sam Valentine (Stuart Wilson) to Santa Campana and proposes a deal with the rebuilt longitude chronometer to be sold to the English for "hellburners" (ships of destruction), but he soon faces setbacks with his old friend's resistance. Meanwhile, Lowe ends up becoming a pawn in Blackbeard's master plan to turn his secret island into his kingdom and is sentenced to death and almost executed.
3	"The Man Who Killed Blackbeard"	Stephen Shill	Neil Cross	June 20, 2014	2.95
When Kate is captured during a routine trade with Father Daniel (Hamilton Clancy), James Balfour asks Lowe to rescue his wife, believing Blackbeard would rather silence her than free her. The unlikely pair must work together in order to rescue her before she reveals the island's location to Jagger. Back on Santa Campana, the locals prepare for a temporary evacuation before the English invade while Charlie is tasked with protecting Selima, who is deathly afraid of stepping outside her home (as the locals name her "The Lady of the House"), causing the pair to become intimate in the stressing situation.
4	"Antoinette"	Dan Attias	Story by : Elizabeth Sarnoff and Michael Oates Palmer; Teleplay by : Michael Oates Palmer	June 27, 2014	2.19
Trying to hide her guilt, Selima's attempt at intimacy with a suspicious Blackbeard gets rejected. Lowe helps Balfour with his opium addiction and ends his affair with Kate, however, Blackbeard threatens Balfour's life if the rehabilitation jeopardizes his work on another chronometer. When Blackbeard asks Lowe's opinion of his headaches, Lowe tricks him into thinking its symptoms of a brain injury and induces hypnosis, allowing him to find a map of Blackbeard's plan to attack the English in Jamaica. Later, Blackbeard travels to Archangel Island to make a deal with Begum Samsarto (Nilanjana Bose) to build an army. Lowe helps Charlie and Nenna on a stealth mission to copy a map from Spanish Governor Fernando de Portocarrero's (Francis Rosas) Mansion in Cuba. In disguise, Blackbeard sells the chronometer to the governor to afford his army. Meanwhile, Finnegan tries to sell the fake chronometer to Jagger, who spots it as such, since he etched his initials on the original, leading to Finnegan's torture. Jagger then plans to bait Blackbeard using the woman in white.
5	"The Return"	Terry McDonough	Michael Oates Palmer	July 11, 2014	2.60
Jagger tortures the woman in white, Antoinette, by holding her underwater, demanding Blackbeard's location, but she remains silent. On Santa Campana, Fletch and Lowe discover a stockpile of gunpowder barrels, believing Blackbeard intends to attack the English in Jamaica. Still loyal to his country, Lowe vows to return to Jamaica and alert his spymaster, Jagger. He convinces Blackbeard of a cure for his malady using a brain surgery tool called the trephine, telling him he can acquire it there. Blackbeard allows him to go, but if he betrays him, Kate will suffer the consequences. Kate questions Lowe's loyalty about his sudden trip, but assures her she is why he remains faithful to the island's inhabitants. Selima and Rider speculate that Blackbeard knows about their affair, but the Commodore reveals to Selima he is dying and wants her to lead the people by overcoming her agoraphobia, so she forces herself outside. In Jamaica, Nenna has her own agenda, and Lowe reports to Jagger that Blackbeard is his captor and bargains for Kate and Fletch lives by revealing the island's location. Fletch follows Blackbeard to his secret meeting with the Wild Man (Henry Hereford). Lowe points to a deserted island Jagger once visited and an altercation ensues with Lowe getting stabbed. Hiding his wound, Lowe purchases the trephine, and with Jagger's men chasing him, he escapes by jumping off a cliff, swimming to his ship. Later, Blackbeard has a ghastly vision of a water-logged Antoinette carrying a baby.
6	"A Hole in the Head"	Deran Sarafian	Josh Friedman	July 18, 2014	2.52
Lowe changes his plans after learning The Wildman is making bombs for Blackbeard to annihilate Jamaica and Jagger to destroy Santa Campana. Balfour overhears Lowe confess to Kate of being a "king's man" with orders to exterminate Blackbeard, and tells Selima, who sends pirates to find him. Lowe has Blackbeard at gunpoint and intends to exchange him with the Governor of Carolina for Jagger to be sent far away. Betrayed, Blackbeard fights Lowe, but instead of killing him, he asks Rider and Selima's obvious opinion. Blackbeard mentions their affair and how Lowe wants to safeguard the island, allowing him to live. Lowe continues with the procedure of drilling a hole in Blackbeard's head. Jagger tortures Antoinette using Lowe's sketchbook as evidence that her husband, Edward "Blackbeard" Teach is alive. She sings Jagger an encrypted cradlesong enabling him to crack the code of the chronometer Blackbeard sold to Governor Portocarrero. Blackbeard will surprise attack and sink the Spanish fleet, making him the only one who knows where the Spaniards' treasure will be sunk. Despite his "cure", Blackbeard has a vivid vision of Antoinette cradling a baby beside his bed, hinting that she has been accessing his dreams the entire time.
7	"Beggarman"	Dan Attias	Neil Cross	July 25, 2014	2.41
When Nelly discovers a letter Rose wrote in case something happened to her, she enlists Lowe and Fletch to help find her friend. They soon track down Nenna, who threatens to kill them if word about the murder gets out. Knowing that Lowe is hated by the citizens, Nenna turns the blame on him and plans an escape, which puts Lowe’s life in jeopardy. Meanwhile, Balfour tells Kate and Fletch the full story of Lowe's identity—when Balfour was a Jacobite, England placed a spy only known by the nom de guerre, "Beggarman" in Scotland to eliminate the Jacobite Shadow Council. After burning Rose's letter and feeling hatred towards Lowe for his past, Balfour forms an unexpected alliance with Nenna to abiding her leaving the island. His punishment for accusing an innocent man without cause and letting a murderer walk free is forty lashes. However, wanting to wipe the slate clean between them, Lowe elects himself by law to be a scapegoat for the crime. But the Commodore recovers from his brain surgery and apparently puts a stop to the lashing, saying he is forgiven. Afterwards, the Commodore says to himself, "I didn't", implying that the lashing was actually stopped by one or more of the citizens.
8	"Crossbones"	Deran Sarafian	Neil Cross	August 2, 2014	1.54
The Commodore sets sail and puts his plan to sink the Spanish fleet in motion, but he puts his crew to the test when Jagger's ship is spotted. Meanwhile, on Santa Compana, Lowe finds out from Kate that their affair caused her to be with child and she requests him to perform a medical procedure to get rid of their reminder. When Lowe denies her, she then turns to Nelly for help with a concoction to help in her predicament. After learning from James of Kate’s poisoning, Lowe performs a blood transfusion using himself to save her. The Commodore appoints Charlie captain of his ship and gives him a red captain’s jacket before battle. However, Charlie’s command is short lived when he disagrees with the Commodore’s endgame is really bent on revenge against his enemies, including Jagger. Thinking he has a mutiny on his hands, the Commodore reminds everyone that he is the notorious "Blackbeard" once again and wounds Charlie in the process, throwing him overboard.
9	"Blackbeard"	Ciaran Donnelly	Neil Cross	August 2, 2014	1.57
Cannon fire rains down on Santa Campana as Blackbeard risks everything his island kingdom as he gathers his crew and the citizens to fight against Jagger's bombardment. Meanwhile, Lowe is torn by making crucial choices between saving Kate, the woman he has grown to love, James, the man he admires and protecting the legacy the Commodore has built. As the battle ensues, Charlie who was plucked out of the sea by Jagger's ship has led them to the island in revenge. But he soon joins in on the fight after Jagger goes back on his promise not to endanger the lives of the inhabitants. Jagger lets Antoinette loose on the island and settles the score with Selima, now the Commodore’s second wife. The final showdown between Jagger and Blackbeard ends with Blackbeard gunning him down. After seeing Selima's dead body in his throne room, Blackbeard kills his first wife and then has a confrontation with Lowe, and is defeated. Lowe wants to take the island for himself and make it a safe haven. Six weeks later, Lowe travels to Jamaica and gives proof of Blackbeard's death—his severed head to General Cornish (Timothy Britten Parker), however Blackbeard is still alive, walking on a beach alone to another chapter in his life.

== Production ==
The network announced the series in May 2012 with a straight-to-series commitment. Ten episodes were ordered, and production began in Puerto Rico on October 15, 2013. Hugh Laurie was in negotiations to be cast in the role of Blackbeard. However, the role later went to Malkovich.

Georgeville Television, which had been participating as a production company, dropped out of the project in 2013.

== Reception ==
Crossbones has received mixed reviews among critics. On Rotten Tomatoes, the show holds a rating of 61%, based on 28 reviews, with the site's critical consensus reading, "John Malkovich's show-stealing performance keeps Crossbones partially afloat, but an overly serious tone and choppy editing make this a leaky vessel for his talents." On Metacritic, the show earned a score of 57 out of 100, based on 23 critics, indicating "mixed or average reviews".

According to The Wrap, "The show leans more closely to blood-and-guts intrigue of Starz's Black Sails than to Pirates of Caribbean merriment"; "NBC's Crossbones series drew [the critic] in with the prospect of John Malkovich as Blackbeard, and while he does indeed dig into the pirate role with relish, it's not enough to save the show. The period yarn begins with great verve Friday night, but stumbles over narrative gymnastics to keep key players plotting against each other." According to Mary McNamara of Los Angeles Times, "Slipstreaming the more hyper-paced and R-rated Black Sails on Starz, Crossbones may have a similar conceit—pirates are people too!—but its narrative ambitions are a bit loftier, driven more by character than plot." McNamara notes "There's so much plot, in fact, that it more than occasionally overwhelms what is clearly the heart of creator Neil Cross' tale: the surprisingly hypnotic game of psychological cat and mouse played by Blackbeard and the man who has been sent to kill him. That would be Tom Lowe (Richard Coyle), super-agent of the Royal Navy who enters our story posing as a ship's doctor."

== Home media ==
On September 2, 2014, Crossbones was released on DVD. It would also be released on Blu-ray.
