= Behind Her Eyes (TV series) =

British psychological thriller web series

- Official Netflix poster
- Genre: Psychological thriller; Supernatural fiction
- Based on: Behind Her Eyes by Sarah Pinborough
- Developed by: Steve Lightfoot
- Directed by: Erik Richter Strand
- Starring: Tom Bateman; Simona Brown; Eve Hewson; Robert Aramayo
- Composer: Rupert Gregson-Williams
- Country of origin: United Kingdom
- Original language: English
- No. of episodes: 6

Production
- Executive producers: Steve Lightfoot; Suzanne Mackie; Andy Harries; Jessica Burdett
- Producer: Eliza Mellor
- Cinematography: Felix Wiedemann
- Editors: Amy Hounsell; Brenna Rangott
- Camera setup: Single-camera
- Running time: 47–53 minutes
- Production companies: Sony Pictures Television; Left Bank Pictures

Original release
- Network: Netflix
- Release: 17 February 2021

Behind Her Eyes is a British psychological thriller television series developed by Steve Lightfoot, based on Sarah Pinborough's 2017 novel of the same name, that premiered on Netflix on 17 February 2021. The limited series stars Tom Bateman, Simona Brown, Eve Hewson and Robert Aramayo.

== Synopsis ==
Louise (Simona Brown) is a single mother who begins an affair with her new boss, David (Tom Bateman). Matters take a strange turn when she is drawn into an unlikely friendship with his wife, Adele (Eve Hewson). What starts as an unconventional love triangle soon becomes a dark tale of suspense and twisted revelations, as Louise finds herself caught in a dangerous web of secrets where nothing and no one is what it seems.

== Cast and characters ==
=== Main ===
- Tom Bateman as Dr. David Ferguson
- Simona Brown as Louise Barnsley
- Eve Hewson as Adele Ferguson (née Campbell)
- Robert Aramayo as Rob Hoyle

=== Recurring ===
- Tyler Howitt as Adam
- Georgie Glen as Sue
- Nichola Burley as Sophie
- Roshan Seth as Dr. Sharma
- Nila Aalia as Geeta Sharma
- Eva Birthistle as Marianne

== Episodes ==
| No. | Title | Directed by | Written by | Original release date |
|---|---|---|---|---|
| 1 | "Chance Encounters" | Erik Richter Strand | Steve Lightfoot | 17 February 2021 |
A spilled drink at a bar leads to an awkward day at work for Louise, who is shaken again by night terrors. David introduces Adele to his new colleagues.
| 2 | "Lucid Dreams" | Erik Richter Strand | Steve Lightfoot | 17 February 2021 |
A peek inside David and Adele's private life—and a look at Rob's dream journal—leaves Louise with more questions than answers.
| 3 | "The First Door" | Erik Richter Strand | Angela LaManna | 17 February 2021 |
Against her better judgment, Louise grows attached to both David and Adele, becoming increasingly enmeshed in their tense, complicated marriage.
| 4 | "Rob" | Erik Richter Strand | Angela LaManna | 17 February 2021 |
An accusation of violence threatens to unravel David's life, and more shocking news awaits him and Louise when Adele drops a bombshell.
| 5 | "The Second Door" | Erik Richter Strand | Steve Lightfoot | 17 February 2021 |
Despite David's warnings, Louise cannot shake her concern for Adele, who sows seeds of doubt over what happened with Rob.
| 6 | "Behind Her Eyes" | Erik Richter Strand | Steve Lightfoot | 17 February 2021 |
Louise visits David's former mistress, Marianne, in Brighton, where the latter reveals how Adele vandalised her home and threatened her. She then confronts David about Rob's death when he explains that Adele threw his body in the well after he overdosed on heroin. After he discovers that Louise has informed the police about Rob's death, David decides to tell them Adele's truth and sets for Scotland. Meanwhile Louise faces Adele for her surreal use of astral projection. When Adele finds out that Louise has told the police and David has decided to tell her truth, she decides to end her life while texting Louise. Worried, Louise arrives at Adele's house, to which she has set fire. Unable to break in, Louise projects out of her body to save Adele. When her soul reaches Adele's body, Adele's soul reaches for Louise's body. The two having swapped bodies, Adele kills Louise in Adele's body with a heroin overdose, takes over her life, and reconciles with David. In a flashback, it is revealed that Rob was in Adele's body when Louise died. After Adele showed Rob how to project, he refused to give Adele's body back and killed her in his own body. He then killed Louise after hijacking her body, wanting to be with David after falling in love with him, and resumed her life.

== Production ==
=== Development ===
On 25 January 2019, it was announced that Netflix had given the production a series order for a six-episode first season. Steve Lightfoot is credited as the creator and executive producer of the series. In August 2019, it was announced that Erik Richter Strand would direct the limited series.

=== Casting ===
In August 2019, it was confirmed that Tom Bateman, Simona Brown, Eve Hewson, and Robert Aramayo would star in the limited series.

=== Filming ===
Principal photography for the limited series took place in London and Scotland from June to October 2019.

== Release ==
On 4 February 2021, Netflix released the official trailer for the limited series. The limited series was released on 17 February 2021.

== Reception ==
The review aggregator website Rotten Tomatoes reported a 62% approval rating for the first season with an average rating of 5.7/10, based on 37 reviews. The website's critical consensus reads, "Behind Her Eyes' many twists may be unexpected, but limited character development also leaves them feeling unearned—still, it may be just bonkers enough to keep forgiving viewers entertained." On Metacritic, it has a weighted average score of 54 out of 100, based on 15 critics, indicating "mixed or average reviews".

The Guardian wrote, "Who knew threesomes could be so boring?" and gave the series a 2-star rating. Rolling Stone wrote, "Netflix's new erotic thriller self-destructs with a series of needlessly crazy twists". The Independent gave the series a 2-star rating, writing, "One bizarre twist can't make up for the yawning lulls". The Irish Times gave a mostly negative review, writing: "You may be charmed. Or it's possible you will wonder why you wasted six hours of your life." Patrick Cremona of Radio Times wrote that the series "flits from the bland to the bizarre without being particularly convincing or compelling".
