= Simona Brown =

English actress (born 1994)

- Born: 6 April 1994 (age 32); London, England
- Occupation: Actress
- Years active: 2013–present

Simona Brown (born 6 April 1994) is an English actress. She starred in the Netflix miniseries Behind Her Eyes (2021). She also appeared in the Freeform series Guilt, the ITV series Him (both 2016), the BBC One series The Little Drummer Girl and the Channel 4 series Kiss Me First (both 2018).

== Early life ==
Simona Brown grew up in Peckham, London, and is of Jamaican heritage. She studied musical theatre at the BRIT School in Croydon and studied acting at the Identity School of Acting in London.

== Career ==
Brown has appeared in TV miniseries including as Gaia in The Casual Vacancy and as Grace in The Night Manager. She had a recurring role as Faith in HIM and as Roz in the 2016 British-American series Guilt. Her other TV roles include the 2016 remake of Roots and Murdered by My Boyfriend. She plays the main character Tess in the 2018 Channel 4/Netflix series Kiss Me First.

In August 2019, it was announced Brown had been cast in the role of Louise on the Netflix psychological thriller miniseries, Behind Her Eyes.

== Filmography ==
=== Film ===
Year	Title	Role	Notes
2015	Man Up	Sophie	Debut Film
2020	Riding with Sugar	Olivia	

=== Television ===
Year	Title	Role	Notes
2013	Run	Teenage Girl	1 episode
2014	Murdered by My Boyfriend	Kim	Television film
2014	Wizards vs. Aliens	Jasmine 'Jazz' James	2 episodes
2015	The Casual Vacancy	Gaia Bawden	
2015	Casualty	Mairo Kaleel	1 episode
2016	Roots	Jinna	1 episode
2016	Guilt	Roz Walters	Main role
2016	The Night Manager	Grace	Recurring role; 3 episodes
2016	Him	Faith	Main role
2018	Outlander	Gayle	Guest role (2 episodes)
2018	Kiss Me First	Tess	Main role
2018	The Little Drummer Girl	Rachel	Main role
2019	Grantchester	Violet Todd	Series 4: Episodes 1-2
2021	Behind Her Eyes	Louise	Main role (6 episodes)
