= Flora and Son =

2023 film by John Carney

- US release poster
- Directed by: John Carney
- Written by: John Carney
- Produced by: Anthony Bregman; John Carney; Peter Cron; Rebecca O'Flanagan; Robert Walpole
- Starring: Eve Hewson; Jack Reynor; Orén Kinlan; Joseph Gordon-Levitt
- Cinematography: John Conroy
- Edited by: Stephen O'Connell
- Music by: Gary Clark; John Carney
- Production companies: FilmNation Entertainment; Fifth Season; Screen Ireland; Likely Story; Distressed Films; Treasure Entertainment
- Distributed by: Apple Original Films (worldwide); Altitude Film Distribution (United Kingdom and Ireland, theatrical)
- Release dates: January 22, 2023 (Sundance); September 22, 2023 (United States); February 23, 2024 (Ireland)
- Running time: 97 minutes
- Countries: Ireland; United States
- Language: English
- Box office: $129,959

Flora and Son is a 2023 musical comedy drama film written and directed by John Carney, featuring original songs by Carney and Gary Clark. The film stars Eve Hewson, Jack Reynor, Orén Kinlan, and Joseph Gordon-Levitt.

Flora and Son had its world premiere at the Sundance Film Festival on January 22, 2023, and was given a limited theatrical release in the United States on September 22, 2023, to be followed by a wide release in Ireland on February 23, 2024. It also began streaming on Apple TV+ worldwide on September 29, 2023. It received positive reviews from critics and was named one of the top 10 independent films of 2023 by the National Board of Review.

== Premise ==
Flora, a single mother living in Dublin, is having trouble with her estranged son Max, a rebellious teenage petty thief. Encouraged by the Gardaí to find Max a hobby, Flora rescues an old guitar from a skip and, with the help of a Los Angeles-based online guitar teacher, discovers that one person's rubbish can be another person's salvation.

== Cast ==
- Eve Hewson as Flora
- Jack Reynor as Ian
- Orén Kinlan as Max
- Joseph Gordon-Levitt as Jeff
- Don Wycherley as Guard
- Sophie Vavasseur as Juanita
- Kelly Thornton as Heart

== Production ==
=== Filming ===
Principal photography took place on location in Dublin. Hewson and Gordon-Levitt were photographed with guitars while filming in Griffith Park in July 2022.

=== Music ===
Original songs for the film come from Carney and Gary Clark, with Clark also writing the score. Clark and Carney had previously collaborated on music for film, stage and television. Speaking at the 2023 Sundance Film Festival, Gordon-Levitt was quoted as saying "I finally got to play music in a movie! It's really true, I've always wanted to do it and I’ve always been a musician at heart and love doing it. I’ve learned to do many things for movies. I've learned to walk on a tightrope or play hockey or, certainly, lots of fighting and shooting and things like that. But this time I was practicing a skill that I've practiced most of my life, but having to do it at a bit more of a skill level than what I was used to." Hewson could play the guitar before they made the film and said all singing she does on screen is her and told The Hollywood Reporter although she had to overcome a "massive, massive fear" of singing in the film, she never turned to her father (musician Bono) for musical tips: "I'd rather sing in front of the entire world."

== Release ==
Flora and Son premiered at the Sundance Film Festival on January 22, 2023. The songs reportedly produced a "spontaneous clap-a-long and rapturous standing ovation" during its first screening. A bidding war for distribution rights came down to Amazon Studios and Apple Studios, with the latter winning the rights for "just under" $20 million. It was screened at the Toronto International Film Festival on September 7, 2023. It was released in select theaters in the United States on September 22, 2023, before streaming worldwide on Apple TV+ starting September 29, 2023.

=== Critical reception ===
On the review aggregator website Rotten Tomatoes, 93% of 156 critics' reviews are positive, with an average rating of 7.4/10. The website's consensus reads: "Another music-fueled crowd pleaser from writer-director John Carney, Flora and Son proves almost impossible to resist." Metacritic, which uses a weighted average, assigned the film a score of 76 out of 100, based on 32 critics, indicating "generally favorable" reviews. In The Wall Street Journal, Kyle Smith called the film his favorite of the year.

In March 2024, the film was nominated for Best Film, Best Director, Best Script, Best Hair and Make Up, Best Original Music and Best Lead Actress for Eve Hewson at the IFTA Film & Drama Awards.

=== Accolades ===
Award	Date of ceremony	Category	Recipient(s)	Result	Ref.
Hollywood Music in Media Awards	November 15, 2023	Original Song – Feature Film	"High Life" – Gary Clark, John Carney, and Eve Hewson	Nominated	
Hollywood Music in Media Awards	November 15, 2023	Song – Onscreen Performance (Film)	Eve Hewson, Joseph Gordon Levitt, Orén Kinlan, and Jack Reynor – "High Life"	Won	
