= Eve Hewson =

Irish actress (born 1991)

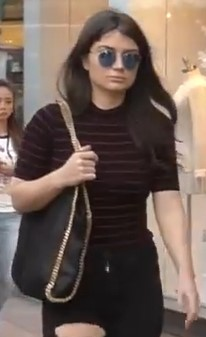
- Hewson in 2016
- Born: Memphis Eve Sunnyday Iris Hewson; 7 July 1991 (age 35); Dublin, Ireland
- Education: New York University (BFA)
- Occupation: Actress
- Years active: 2011–present
- Parents: Bono (father); Ali Hewson (mother)
- Relatives: Elijah Hewson

Memphis Eve Sunnyday Iris Hewson (born 7 July 1991) is an Irish actress. A daughter of activist Ali Hewson and singer Bono, she had her first major role in the 2011 drama film This Must Be the Place, and subsequently starred in the 2014 series The Knick. She appeared in films such as Blood Ties (2013), Bridge of Spies (2015) and Robin Hood (2018).

Hewson had starring roles in the fantasy miniseries The Luminaries (2020) and Behind Her Eyes (2021); the comedy series Bad Sisters (2022); and the mystery series The Perfect Couple (2024). She also played the title role in the musical film Flora and Son (2023), and starred in Steven Spielberg's Disclosure Day (2026).

== Early life ==
Hewson was born in Dublin, Ireland, the second daughter of activist Ali Hewson (née Alison Stewart) and U2 lead singer Bono (Paul David Hewson). Her name is derived from her time and date of birth (7 a.m. on 7 July), as "eve" is the middle of the word "seven". Her godfather is musician Gavin Friday.

She has an older sister, Jordan, and two younger brothers, Elijah and John. She attended nearby Dalkey School Project primary school, and St. Andrew's College in Booterstown, also in Dublin, for secondary education. The U2 song "Kite" was inspired by a moment when Bono took a kite up on Killiney Hill with Hewson and her sister, but the kite blew away and smashed.

She did a short course at the New York Film Academy in 2008. In 2009, she commenced studies in acting, with subsidiary focus on psychology, at New York University's Tisch School of the Arts, graduating in 2013.

== Career ==
Although Hewson's parents were against her performing, she took part in the acting programme at the New York Film Academy. In 2010, she appeared in the music video and accompanying short film for Irish band The Script's song "For the First Time".

She portrayed Yvonne in the 2013 thriller film Blood Ties. In July 2013, Jack Quaid and Hewson asked fans to help them fund a new film called Roadies using crowdsourcing. In September of that year, she appeared in the romantic comedy film Enough Said as the daughter of James Gandolfini's character Albert. In November 2013, she was nominated for the Tatler Irish Woman of the Year Award for her work in films.

From 2014 to 2015, she co-starred in Steven Soderbergh's Cinemax TV series The Knick. In October 2015, she appeared as Carol Donovan in Steven Spielberg's Cold War movie Bridge of Spies. She portrays the daughter of the film's main character, played by Tom Hanks.

She played Maid Marian in the Otto Bathurst version of Robin Hood, which was released in November 2018, starring Taron Egerton, Jamie Foxx and Jamie Dornan. In August 2019, it was announced Hewson had been cast in the role of Adele on the Netflix psychological thriller miniseries Behind Her Eyes, which premiered in 2021.

In 2020, she starred as Anna Wetherell in the drama The Luminaries. Broadcast on BBC One in June, it was based on Eleanor Catton's 2013 novel, set in New Zealand during the gold rush of 1866, and also starred French actress Eva Green. She plays Anna Wetherell, a young woman who migrates to the country's South Island and is soon trafficked into the sex trade. She subsequently starred in the Apple TV+ limited series Bad Sisters.

In 2024, she joined the Netflix mini-series The Perfect Couple alongside Nicole Kidman, Liev Schreiber and Dakota Fanning.

== Personal life ==
Hewson grew up in Killiney, an affluent suburb of Dublin; she later lived in Williamsburg, Brooklyn. She has a sister, Jordan Hewson, and two younger brothers, Elijah Hewson and John Hewson. She graduated from New York University on 22 May 2013; her father, Bono, declined an offer of an honorary Doctorate of Humane Letters from NYU on the same day, stating he wishes to focus on "being a proud father".

Hewson dated One Tree Hill actor James Lafferty from 2010 to 2015. Hewson moved back to Ireland and was based at the family home during and after the COVID-19 pandemic; she remained based in Killiney as of early 2023. As of June 2026, Hewson lives in Los Angeles.

== Filmography ==
Key
| † | Denotes projects that have not yet been released |

=== Film ===
| Year | Title | Role | Notes |
|---|---|---|---|
| 2008 | The 27 Club | Stella | |
| 2011 | This Must Be the Place | Mary | |
| 2013 | Blood Ties | Yvonne | |
| 2013 | Enough Said | Tess | |
| 2015 | Bridge of Spies | Carol Donovan | |
| 2017 | Papillon | Nenette | |
| 2018 | Paper Year | Franny Winters | |
| 2018 | Robin Hood | Maid Marian | |
| 2019 | The True Adventures of Wolfboy | Rose | |
| 2020 | Tesla | Anne Morgan | |
| 2023 | Flora and Son | Flora | |
| 2025 | Jay Kelly | Daphne Spender | |
| 2026 | Disclosure Day | Jane Blankenship | |
| 2027 | Isle of Man † | TBA | Filming |
| 2027 | Hillside Drive † | TBA | In Production |

=== Television ===
| Year | Title | Role | Notes |
|---|---|---|---|
| 2014–2015 | The Knick | Lucy Elkins | 20 episodes |
| 2020 | The Luminaries | Anna Wetherell | Miniseries |
| 2021 | Behind Her Eyes | Adele Ferguson / Adele Campbell | Miniseries |
| 2022–2024 | Bad Sisters | Becka Garvey | 18 episodes |
| 2024 | The Perfect Couple | Amelia Sacks | Miniseries |

=== Music videos ===
| Year | Artist | Title | Role |
|---|---|---|---|
| 2010 | The Script | "For the First Time" | Della Dillingham Young |

== Awards ==
| Year | Award | Category | Work | Result | Ref |
|---|---|---|---|---|---|
| 2021 | Irish Film & Television Awards | Lead Actress – Television | Behind Her Eyes | Nominated | |
| 2021 | Irish Film & Television Awards | Rising Star | | Nominated | |
| 2023 | Irish Film & Television Awards | Supporting Actress – Television | Bad Sisters | Nominated | |
