= Little Eve (disambiguation) =

Little Eve may refer to:

- Little Eve, a 2007 album by Kate Miller-Heidke
- Little Eve (book), a 2018 novel by Catriona Ward
- Little Eve Edgarton, a 1916 silent film
- Little Eve and Big Mouth, the successor act to Dutch pop band Mouth and MacNeal

== See also ==
- Little Eva (disambiguation)
