= Santiago Menghini =

Canadian director

- Occupations: Filmmaker; visual effects artist
- Years active: 2009–present
- Notable work: No One Gets Out Alive
- Website: santiagomenghini.com

Santiago Menghini is a Canadian filmmaker and visual effects artist. He is best known for directing the 2021 horror film No One Gets Out Alive.

== Career ==
Menghini started his career directing short films, such as Intruders (2014), Voyagers (2015), Milk (2018), and Regret (2020). He also co-founded Nemesis Films with Dominique Dussault and Jonah Malak in 2012.

In 2018, his horror short film Milk won the Midnight Shorts Jury Award at the 2018 edition of South by Southwest and the award for Best Director in the short film competition at the 2018 Fantasia International Film Festival, and was a Prix Iris nominee for Best Live Action Short Film at the 21st Quebec Cinema Awards in 2019. His short film Regret won the Midnight Shorts Jury Award at SXSW in 2020.

On September 19, 2018, it was announced that Menghini was set to direct the horror film Milk, which is based on his short film. Ben Collins and Luke Piotrowski were set to write the screenplay with James Wan and Roy Lee producing the film through their Atomic Monster and Vertigo Entertainment banners, respectively, alongside Good Fear. New Line Cinema and Warner Bros. Pictures are set to distribute the film.

In 2021, Menghini made his directorial debut with the horror film No One Gets Out Alive, which is loosely based on the 2014 novel of the same name by Adam Nevill. It stars Cristina Rodlo and Marc Menchaca and was released on September 29, 2021 by Netflix.

On October 9, 2025, it was announced that Menghini would direct The Revenge of La Llorona, a sequel to the 2019 film The Curse of La Llorona. It stars Monica Raymund, Jay Hernandez, Raymond Cruz and Edy Ganem. James Wan serves as a producer through his Blumhouse Atomic banner. The film will be released theatrically in the United States on February 26, 2027 by New Line Cinema and Warner Bros. Pictures.

== Filmography ==
=== Short film ===
Year	Title	Director	Writer	Producer
2009	Ohm	Yes	Yes	Yes
2012	Glimpscapes	Yes	Yes	Yes
2014	The Akira Project	No	No	Yes
2014	Intruders	Yes	Yes	No
2015	Voyagers	Yes	No	Yes
2015	Temple	No	Yes	Yes
2018	Milk	Yes	Yes	Executive
2019	Red Wine	Yes	Yes	Yes
2020	Regret	Yes	Yes	Yes
2024	Rally	Yes	Yes	Yes

=== Television ===
Year	Title	Notes
2013	Les Jaunes	Executive producer

=== Feature film ===
Year	Title	Distributor	Notes
2021	No One Gets Out Alive	Netflix	Directorial debut
2027	The Revenge of La Llorona	Warner Bros. Pictures	Post-production

Executive producer only

- Les Jaunes (2014)
