= Mowgli: Legend of the Jungle (soundtrack) =

Mowgli: Legend of the Jungle (Original Motion Picture Soundtrack)

Film score by Nitin Sawhney
- Released: December 7, 2018
- Genre: Film score
- Length: 72:12
- Label: WaterTower Music
- Producer: Nitin Sawhney

Nitin Sawhney chronology
Breathe (2017)	Mowgli: Legend of the Jungle (2018)	Traitors (2019)

Mowgli: Legend of the Jungle (Original Motion Picture Soundtrack) is the soundtrack to the 2018 film of the same name directed by Andy Serkis. The original score is composed by Nitin Sawhney, who previously worked with Serkis in Breathe (2017). The album consists of 29 tracks from Sawhney's score and an original song "Changes" performed by Kara Marni, which has three alternative versions. WaterTower Music released the soundtrack on December 7, 2018, coinciding with the Netflix premiere.

== Development ==
Serkis intended to search for "Mowgli's tone, heart, pulse and rhythm" and thought that he wanted Nitin Sawhney to create the score, which was intended to "hopefully become a visceral and immersive adaption of Kipling's novel. Sawhney previously collaborated with Serkis on the latter's directorial debut film Breathe (2017).

In an interview to GoldDerby, he rebuked the rumours of the film being Disney's 2016 adaptation of the novel, while claiming it as "Andy [Serkis] going back to the original source material and finding a world that is about Andy's vision of this and interpretation of it". He wanted to capture the essence of Mowgli as the character "comes to terms with his identity at puberty between the world of animals and men".

While the score needed to "appeal the mass audience", he also wanted to retain that authenticity with the Indian classical tradition. Hence, he used several region-specific instruments and combined with the 87-piece orchestra to extend the musical palette of the musical sounds.

In addition to composing the original music, he also wrote the song "Changes" performed by Kara Marni, to capture the narrative and feeling of the titular character in the music and lyrics. He reprised the main orchestral theme from the film "to create that kind of melody and the flavor of the song".

== Track listing ==
No.	Title	Artist	Length
1.	"The Wolf Boy"		1:19
2.	"Changes"	Kara Marni	3:53
3.	"Invocation"		1:03
4.	"Khan's Attack"		0:29
5.	"Bagheera Finds Mowgli"		2:30
6.	"Of Course You're Different / Straight Back To the Caves"		2:58
7.	"This Is the Jungle / Practice Running"		2:16
8.	"The Monkey"		0:42
9.	"Give Him To the Tiger"		1:19
10.	"You Are a Man Cub"		2:28
11.	"The Calm Before Khan / Stalking the Man Cub / The True Kings\"		4:00
12.	"You Belong"		2:00
13.	"The Running of the Pack"		2:55
14.	"Mowgli's Failure"		1:48
15.	"The Monkeys Kidnap Mowgli"		1:46
16.	"Khan's Arrival In the Lair / Baloo and Bagheera Save Mowgli"		2:58
17.	"We're Not Special"		1:22
18.	"Kaa's Lair"		3:53
19.	"Khan's Takeover"		2:07
20.	"Mowgli's Banishment"		1:38
21.	"Bagheera's Visit"		4:18
22.	"Village Life"		2:40
23.	"Come Home"		1:48
24.	"Holi Festival"		1:37
25.	"Campfire"		1:36
26.	"Hathi's Tusk"		1:52
27.	"The Next Day"		0:39
28.	"Challenging Khan / The Fight / There's the Hunter"		4:48
29.	"Khan's End"		1:46
30.	"Lori" (Lullaby)	Nicki Wells	1:04
31.	"Changes" (Slow Burner Mix)	Kara Marni	3:34
32.	"Changes" (Reprise)	Kara Marni	3:06
Total length:			72:12

== Reception ==
Sampada Sharma of The Indian Express wrote that "the music by Nitin Sawhney uses a lot of instruments that are usually associated with India, like the flute. But in places, Nitin goes a little overboard and we consciously feel like this is the work of an outsider who is trying too hard to remind us that the film has Indian roots". The Upcoming-based Guy Lambert wrote: "When paired with a formidable Nitin Sawhney soundtrack, the picture bounces off the screen in an immersive wave, transporting the audience effortlessly into the dense Indian undergrowth". Critic based at Irish Cinephile wrote that the score by Nitin Sawhney felt "great throughout the film".

== Credits ==
Credits adapted from CD liner notes:

- Music composed and produced by – Nitin Sawhney
- Programming – Alistair Kerley, Enrica Sciandrone, Nitin Sawhney
- Recording and mixing – Nick Wollage
- Additional mixing – James Turner
- Mastering – Gavin Lurssen, Reuben Cohen
- Score editor – Peter Clark
- Music supervisor – Becky Bentham
- Pro-tools operator – Chris Barrett
- Studio engineer – Harry Timson
- Assistant engineer – Jay Witsey
- Copyist – Dave Hage
- Liner notes – Andy Serkis, Nitin Sawhney
- Art direction – Sandeep Sriram

Instruments

- Bansuri flute – Ashwin Srinivasan
- Bassoon, contrabassoon – Gavin McNaughton (P1), Rachel Simms (P2)
- Cello – Jonathan Williams (P1), Bozidar Vukotic, Caroline Dale, Chris Worsey, Dave Daniels, Frank Schaefer, Ian Burdge, Joely Koos, Martin Loveday, Nick Cooper, Paul Kegg, Tony Lewis, Vicky Matthews
- Clarinet, bass, contrabass – Jon Carnac (P1), Anthony Pike (P2)
- Double bass – Chris Laurence (P1), Lucy Shaw, Markus van Horn, Melissa Favell-Wright, Paul Kimber, Richard Pryce, Roger Linley, Stacey Watton, Steve Mair, Steve Williams
- Flute – Karen Jones (P1), Anna Noakes (P2)
- French horn – Alexei Watkins, Corinne Bailey, Jonathan Williams, Laurence Davies, Martin Owen, Nicholas Korth, Nigel Black, Paul Gardham, Richard Bissill, Richard Watkins, Simon Rayner
- Harp – Skaila Kanga
- Oboe – David Thomas (P1), Jane Marshall (P2)
- Percussion – Pete Lockett
- Trombone – Andy Wood, Ed Tarrant, Mark Nightingale, Peter North, Richard Edwards, Roger Argente, Tracey Holloway
- Trumpet – Alistair Mackie, Andrew Crowley, Christian Barraclough, Jason Evans
- Tuba – Laurence Davies, Mike Thompson, Owen Slade, Phil Eastop, Richard Berry, Roger Montgomery, Simon Rayner
- Viola – Peter Lale (P1), Andy Parker, Bruce White, Fiona Bonds, Gillianne Haddow, Helen Kamminga, Jenny Lewisohn, Julia Knight, Kate Musker, Martin Humbey, Rachel Bolt, Rachel Roberts, Reiad Chibah, Sue Dench, Vicci Wardman
- Violin – Tom Pigott-Smith (Concertmaster), Roger Garland (P2), Bea Lovejoy, Chris Tombling, Dai Emanuel, Debbie Widdup, Everton Nelson, Gaby Lester, Harriet Davies, Helen Paterson, Jackie Shave, Jackie Hartley, Jeremy Isaac, Jonathan Evans-Jones, Kate Robinson, Kathy Gowers, Magnus Johnston, Marianne Haynes, Mark Berrow, Martyn Jackson, Miranda Dale, Natalia Bonner, Patrick Kiernan, Perry Montague-Mason, Philippa Ibbotson, Richard George, Rita Manning, Steve Morris, Tom Kemp, Warren Zielinski, Anna Phoebe McElligott (soloist)

Orchestra

- Orchestration – Nitin Sawhney, Nicholas Dodd
- Leader – Tom Pigott-Smith
- Conductor – Nicholas Dodd
- Contractor – Isobel Griffiths
- Assistant contractor – Amy Stewart

Management

- Executive assistant – Tina Arena
- Executive in charge of music (Warner Bros. Pictures) – Karen Elliott, Paul Broucek
- Executive in charge (WaterTower Music) – Jason Linn
- Music business affairs – Ari Taitz, Dirk Hebert
