= No One Gets Out Alive (film) =

2021 film by Santiago Menghini

- Release poster
- Directed by: Santiago Menghini
- Screenplay by: Jon Croker; Fernanda Coppel
- Story by: Jon Croker
- Based on: No One Gets Out Alive by Adam Nevill
- Produced by: Jonathan Cavendish; Will Tennant
- Starring: Cristina Rodlo; Marc Menchaca
- Cinematography: Stephen Murphy
- Edited by: Mark Towns
- Music by: Mark Korven
- Production company: The Imaginarium
- Distributed by: Netflix
- Release date: 29 September 2021
- Running time: 87 minutes
- Country: United Kingdom
- Languages: English; Spanish; Romanian; Portuguese

No One Gets Out Alive is a 2021 British supernatural horror film directed by Santiago Menghini (in his directorial debut) from a screenplay by Jon Croker and Fernanda Coppel, loosely based on the 2014 novel of the same name by Adam Nevill. It stars Cristina Rodlo and Marc Menchaca and was released on 29 September 2021 by Netflix.

== Plot ==
Ambar, an undocumented immigrant, moves from Mexico to Cleveland, Ohio, after her mother dies. She supports herself with an under the table job and her savings. In search of a place to stay, she finds a dilapidated boarding house run by Red, who requires the first month's rent up front. After she moves in, strange things start happening to her there and elsewhere. One night she sees a man banging his head against the door, who she later learns is Red's mentally ill brother, Becker. Some rooms in the house are filled with strange artifacts, including depictions of ritual sacrifice. Ambar begins to see ghostly figures around the house.

In search of a better job, she gives a co-worker the remainder of her savings to obtain a fake ID that proclaims her a U.S. citizen, but the co-worker steals the money and disappears. When Ambar insists her boss give her the co-worker's address, he fires her.

Frightened by supernatural visions, Ambar flees the boarding house. Desperate for money and unable to receive help from her distant uncle, Beto, Ambar is forced to call Red. They meet at a nearby diner and Red promises to refund her deposit, but only if she returns to the house as he claims to not have the cash on him. When they arrive at the boarding house, the cash is not in her room as promised. Instead, Becker shows up and forces Ambar to drink some wine. As soon as he leaves, she locks her door. A while later, two Romanian women who have also moved into the boarding house knock on her door. They discuss their dreams about a stone box. Petra starts singing which puts Ambar to sleep.

Ambar wakes up to Red and Becker restraining the women and preparing them to be taken down to the basement. She attacks Red to try to stop him, but Becker throws her against the wall. Beto comes looking for Ambar but is assaulted by Becker. After Becker takes one of the women downstairs, Red tells Ambar that his dad was an archaeologist (as seen in the home movies at the start of the film) who brought back a stone box from his trip to Mexico in 1963. Red's father, along with his mother Mary, trapped and murdered women (the ghosts that Ambar has seen and heard throughout the house). After they killed their father for sacrificing their mother, Red wanted to leave but Becker insisted on staying, as each woman sacrificed to the stone box improved Becker's health.

Becker returns and carries the screaming Ambar to the basement, where she sees the other woman has been decapitated. He ties Ambar to a stone slab in front of an altar where the box sits, opens the box and leaves the room, shutting the door behind him. Ambar continues screaming and Beto bursts into the room and unties her.

As they attempt to escape the basement, Ambar is caught up in a dream of her mother on her deathbed. At the same time, a large moth-like creature slowly emerges from the box and takes Ambar's head between its hands. In the dream, Ambar's mother is begging her to stay, and she begins to strangle Ambar. However, Ambar fights back and suffocates her mother instead. This causes the monster, the Aztec goddess Ītzpāpālōtl (God of Paradise made possible through sacrifice), associated with the moth seen throughout the film (Rothschildia erycina), to retreat back into the box. Ambar comes out of the dream state to find herself standing by the altar alone.

Ambar hears Becker and Red preparing Petra for sacrifice. Becker notices his wounds are not healing and says something is wrong. Ambar grabs a macuahuitl from the study and goes upstairs, where she injures Red and is then attacked by Becker. Petra tries to help but is thrown over the balcony and killed. Becker chokes Ambar, but she slices his carotid artery with an obsidian blade from the macuahuitl, then smashes his head with it. She hears Red, wounded but alive, shuffling around in the next room. She brings him downstairs, ties him onto the stone table, and watches the monster bite off his head. Walking through the house, she passes Red, who has become a ghost like the other sacrificed women. As she starts to leave the house, her ankle, broken by Becker earlier, suddenly heals as a result of sacrificing Red to the monster. She stops and puts out her hand to let a moth land on it then turns back towards the basement door, showing the same darkened throbbing veins that Becker had.

== Cast ==
- Cristina Rodlo as Ambar
- Marc Menchaca as "Red"
- David Figlioli as Becker
- David Barrera as Beto
- Moronkẹ Akinola as Kinsi
- Phil Robertson as Arthur Welles
- Joana Borja as Simona
- Victoria Alcock as Mary
- Mitchell Mullen as Rilles
- Vala Noren as Freja
- Alejandro Akara as Carlos
- Jeff Mirza as Motel Manager

== Reception ==
On the review aggregator website Rotten Tomatoes, the film holds an approval rating of 65% based on 23 reviews, with an average rating of 5.5/10. Metacritic gave the film a weighted average score of 43 out of 100 based on 5 critics, indicating "mixed or average reviews".

Benjamin Lee of The Guardian gave three stars out of five saying "There's enough of a jolt here for horror fans to feel briefly sated and enough for Netflix horror fans to feel briefly transformed." Randy Myers of San Jose Mercury News awarded three stars out of four, stating the film is "a stand-up-and-take-notice feature debut from filmmaker Santiago Menghini." Monica Castillo, writing for RogerEbert.com, commended the premise and the cast performances "even if everything doesn't quite work out." In a three out of five star review published by The Age, Jake Wilson writes: "If you've ever felt adrift in a new city, or woken up at night wondering how you're going to pay the rent, you may find this particular nightmare more haunting than most."

In a negative review from Showbiz Cheat Sheet, Jeff Nelson criticised the lack of variety in its "creepy moments", calling them "less effective" as they are essentially repeated. Lyra Hale of Fangirlish gave the film a grade of F, stating the reason as: "No One Gets Out Alive falls flat on its face from the very start as it tries to present itself as this arthouse-style movie that exemplifies the hardships of immigrants with a twist of horror."
