= Heavy metal subculture =

Culture of heavy metal fans

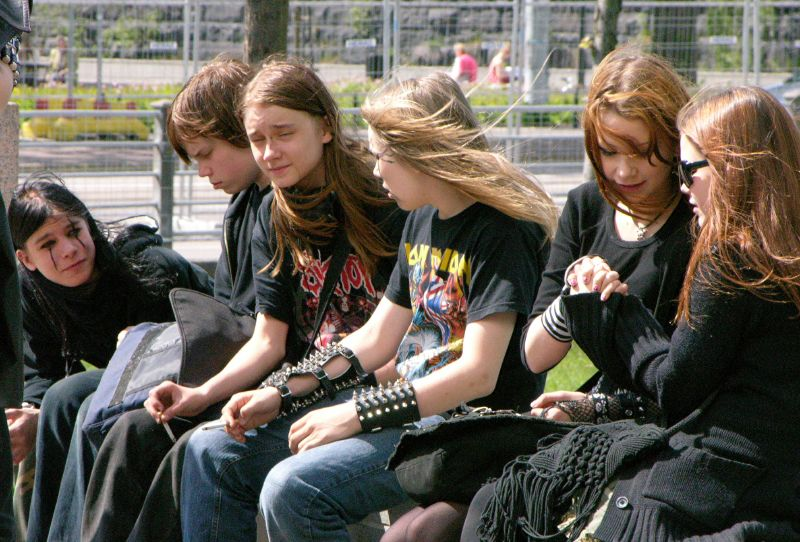
Young metalheads

Fans of heavy metal music, commonly referred to as metalheads, have created their own subculture that encompasses more than just appreciation of the style of music. Fans affirm their membership in the subculture or scene by attending metal concerts (an activity seen as central to the subculture), buying albums, growing their hair long (although some metalheads do wear their hair short; one very famous example is late 70s to 80s-era Rob Halford), wearing jackets or vests often made of denim and leather decorated with band patches and metal studs, and by contributing to metal publications since the early 1980s.

The metal scene, like the rock scene in general, is associated with alcohol (especially beer), tobacco and drug use, as well as riding motorcycles and having many tattoos. While there are songs that celebrate drinking, smoking, drug use, having tattoos and partying, there are also many songs that warn about the dangers of those activities. The metal fan base was traditionally working class, white and male in the 1970s, and since the 1980s, more female fans have developed an interest in the style. Metal culture has also grown more popular among African Americans and other groups since the 1990s and 2000s.

== Nomenclature ==
Heavy metal fans go by a number of different names, including metalhead, headbanger, hesher, mosher, and thrasher, being used only for fans of thrash metal, which began to differentiate itself from other varieties of metal in the late 80s. While the aforementioned labels vary in time and regional divisions, headbanger and metalhead are universally accepted to mean fans or the subculture itself.

== Subculture ==
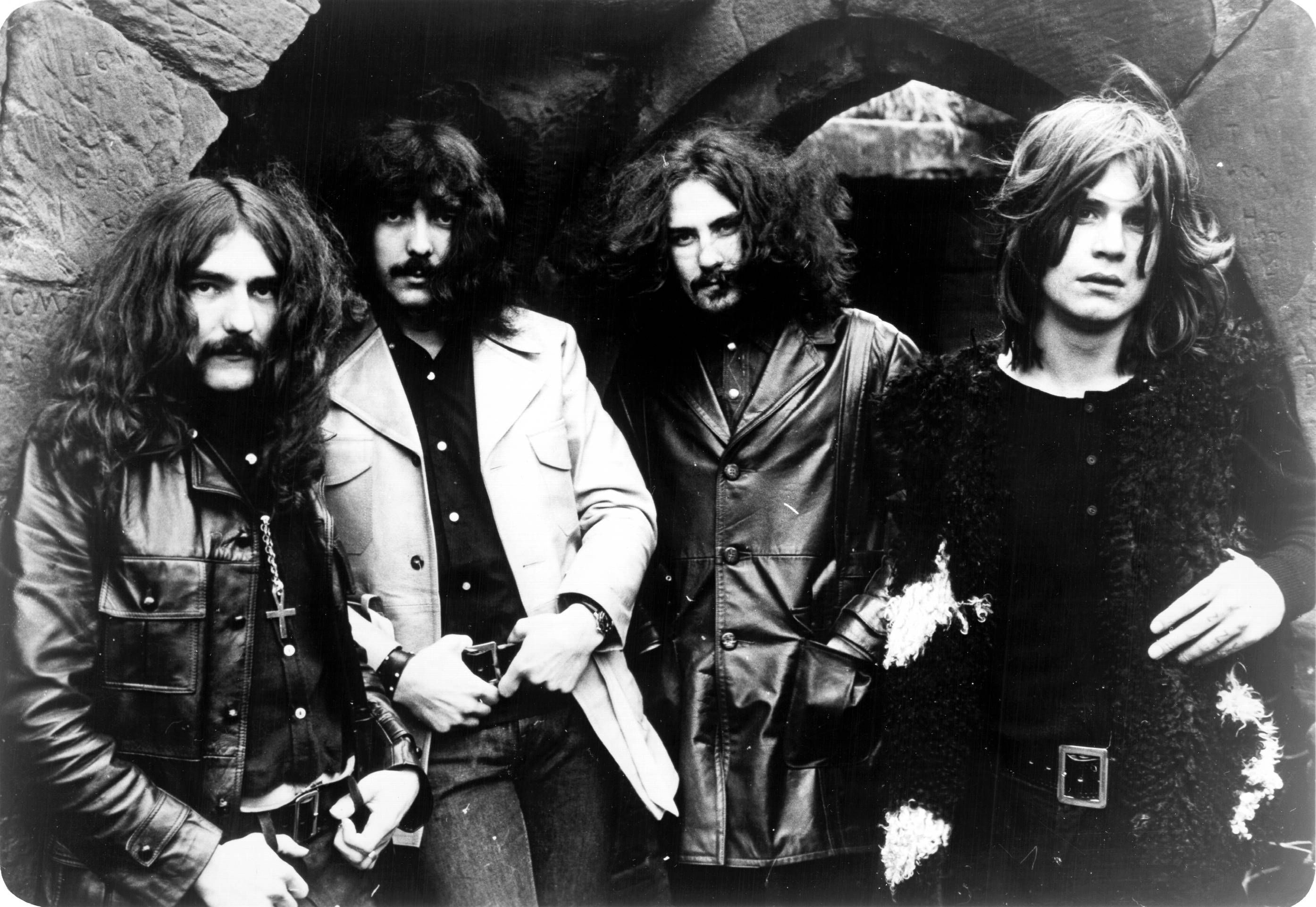
Black Sabbath are one of the biggest pioneers of heavy metal and are often referred to as the first true metal band.

Heavy metal fans have created a "subculture of alienation" with its own standards for achieving authenticity within the group. Deena Weinstein's book Heavy Metal: The Music And Its Culture argues that heavy metal "has persisted far longer than most genres of rock music" due to the growth of an intense "subculture which identified with the music." Metal fans formed an "exclusionary youth community" that was "distinctive and marginalized from the mainstream" society. The heavy metal scene developed a strongly masculine "community with shared values, norms, and behaviors." A "code of authenticity" is central to the heavy metal subculture; this code requires bands to have a "disinterest in commercial appeal" and radio hits as well as a refusal to "sell out." The metal code also includes "opposition to established authority, and separateness from the rest of society." Fans expect that the metal "vocation [for performers] includes total devotion to the music and deep loyalty to the youth subculture that grew up around it;" a metal performer must be an "idealized representative of the subculture."

While the audience for metal is mainly "white, male, lower/middle class youth," this group is "tolerant of those outside its core demographic base who follow its codes of dress, appearance, and behavior." The activities in the metal subculture include the ritual of attending concerts, buying albums, and most recently, contributing to metal websites. Attending concerts affirms the solidarity of the subculture, as it is one of the ritual activities by which fans celebrate their music. Metal magazines help the members of the subculture to connect, find information and evaluations of bands and albums, and "express their solidarity." The long hair, leather jackets, and band patches of heavy metal fashion help encourage a sense of identification within the subculture. However, Weinstein notes that not all metal fans are "visible members" of the heavy metal subculture. Some metal fans may have short hair and dress in regular clothes.

=== Authenticity ===
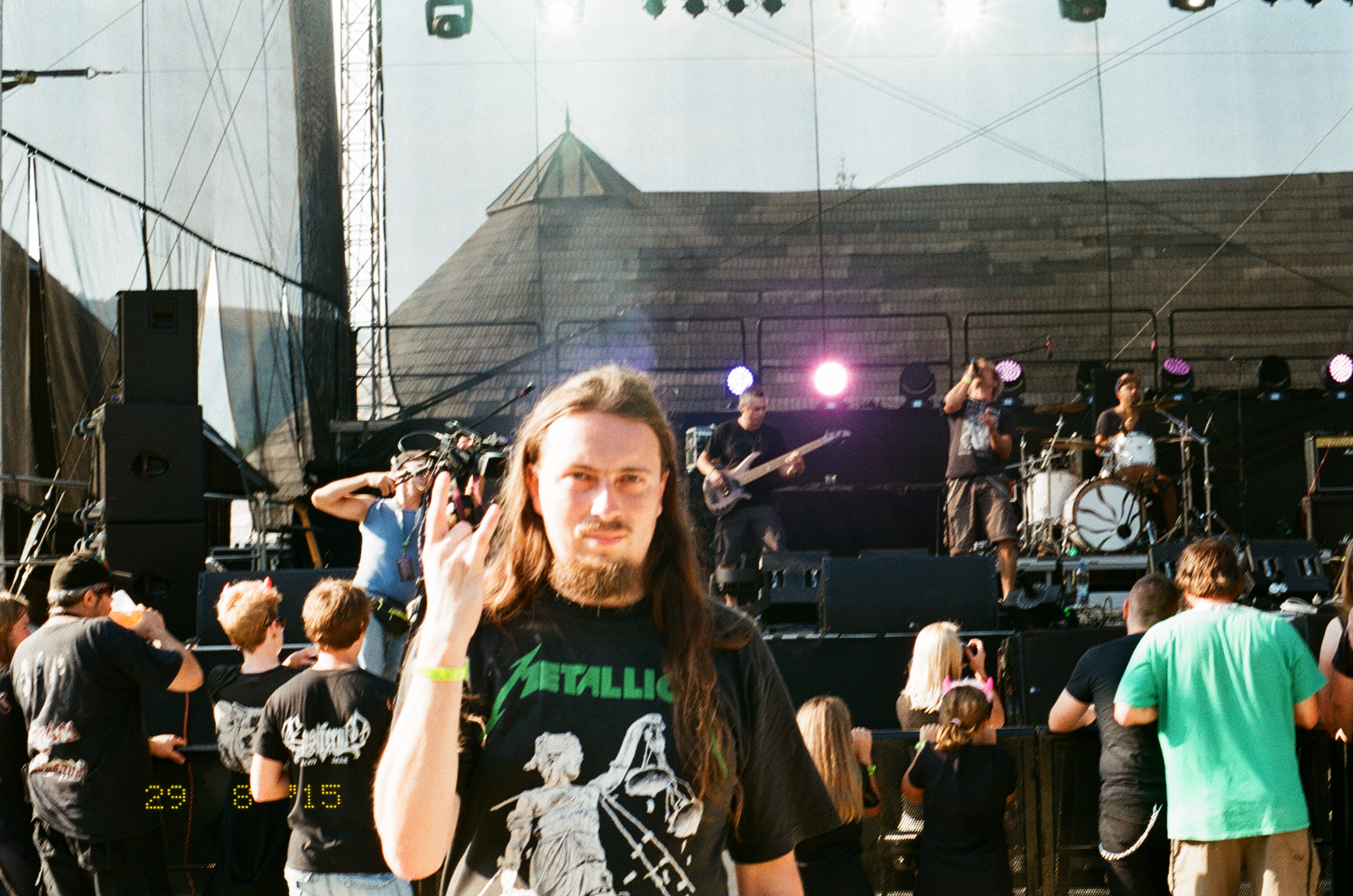
A metalhead wearing a Metallica shirt at a concert.

In the musical subcultures of heavy metal and punk, authenticity is a core value. The term poseur (or poser) is used to describe "a person who habitually pretends to be something he/she is not," as in adopting the appearance and clothing style of the metal scene without truly understanding the culture and its music. In a 1993 profile of heavy metal fans' "subculture of alienation," the author noted that the scene classified some members as "poseurs," that is, heavy metal performers or fans who pretended to be part of the subculture, but who were deemed to lack authenticity and sincerity. Jeffrey Arnett's 1996 book Metalheads: Heavy Metal Music and Adolescent Alienation argues that the heavy metal subculture classifies members into two categories by giving "acceptance as an authentic metalhead or rejection as a fake, a poseur."

Heavy metal fans began using the term sell out in the 1980s to refer to bands who turned their heavy metal sound into radio-friendly rock music (e.g., glam metal). In metal, a sell out is "someone dishonest who adopted the most rigorous pose, or identity-affirming lifestyle and opinions." The metal bands that earned this epithet are those "who adopt the visible aspects of the orthodoxy (sound, images) without contributing to the underlying belief system."

Ron Quintana's article on "Metallica['s] Early History" argues that when Metallica was trying to find a place in the L.A. metal scene in the early 1980s, "American hard-rock scene was dominated by highly coiffed, smoothly-polished bands such as Styx, Journey, and REO Speedwagon." He claims that this made it hard for Metallica to "play their [heavy] music and win over a crowd in a land where poseurs ruled and anything fast and heavy was ignored." In David Rocher's 1999 interview with Damian Montgomery, the frontman of Ritual Carnage, he praised Montgomery as "an authentic, no-frills, poseur-bashing, nun-devouring kind of gentleman, an enthusiastic metalhead truly in love with the lifestyle he preaches ... and unquestionably practises."

In 2002, "[m]etal guru Josh Wood" claimed that the "credibility of heavy metal" in North America is being destroyed by the genre's demotion to "horror movie soundtracks, wrestling events and, worst of all, the so-called 'Mall Core' groups like Limp Bizkit." Wood claims that the "true [metal] devotee's path to metaldom is perilous and fraught with poseurs." Christian metal bands are sometimes criticized within metal circles in a similar light. Some extreme metal adherents argue that Christian bands' adherence to the Christian church is an indicator of membership in an established authority, which renders Christian bands as "posers" and a contradiction to heavy metal's purpose. Some proponents argue personal faith in right-hand path beliefs should not be tolerated within metal. A small number of Norwegian black metal bands have threatened violence (and, in extremely rare instances, exhibited it) towards Christian artists or believers, as demonstrated in the early 1990s through occasional church arsons throughout Scandinavia.

== Social aspects and stereotypes ==
=== Attire ===
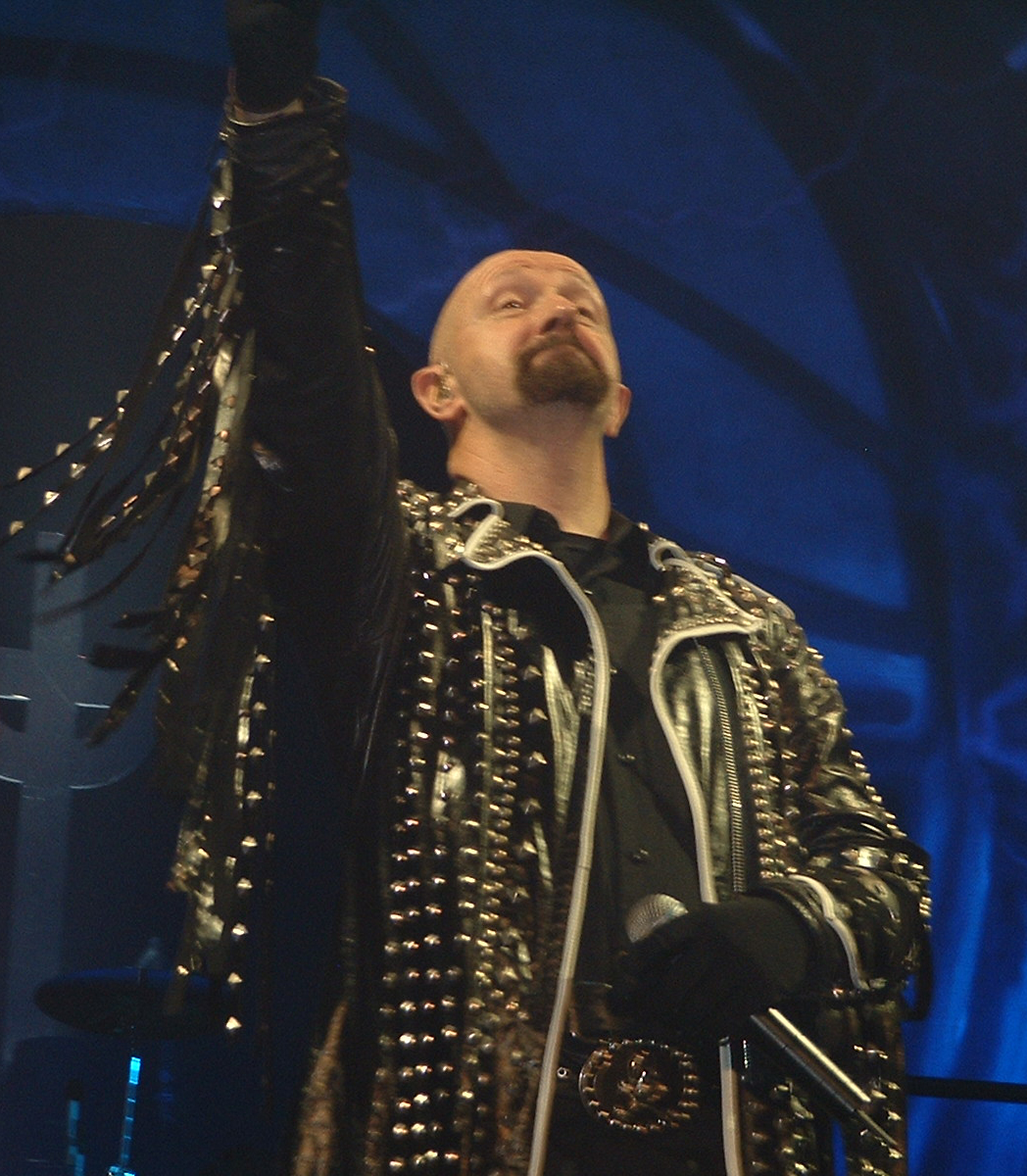
Rob Halford of Judas Priest wearing studded leather jacket

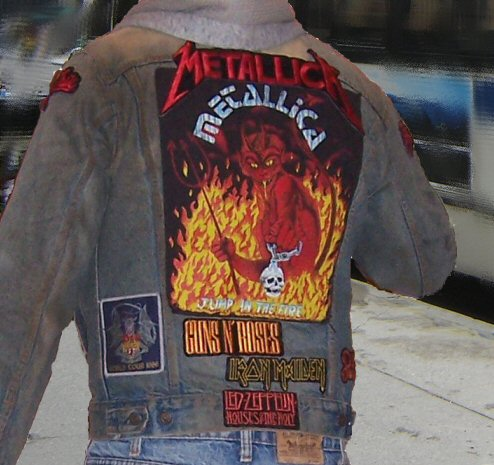
A man wearing a denim jacket with band patches and artwork of metal bands including Metallica, Guns N' Roses, Iron Maiden, Slipknot and Led Zeppelin

Another aspect of heavy metal culture is its fashion. Like the metal music, these fashions have changed over the decades, while keeping some core elements. Typically, the heavy metal fashions of the late 1970s – 1980s comprised tight blue jeans or drill pants, motorcycle boots or hi-top sneakers and black T-shirts, worn with a sleeveless kutte of denim or leather emblazoned with woven patches and button pins from heavy metal bands. Sometimes, a denim vest, emblazoned with album art "knits" (cloth patches) would be worn over a long-sleeved leather jacket. As with other musical subcultures of the era, such as punks, this jacket and its emblems and logos helped the wearer to announce their interests. Metal fans often wear T-shirts with the emblem of bands.

Around the mid-2000s, a renaissance of younger audiences became interested in 1980s metal, and the rise of newer bands embracing older fashion ideals led to a more 1980s-esque style of dress. Some of the new audience are young, urban hipsters who had "previously fetishized metal from a distance".

=== Gestures and movements ===
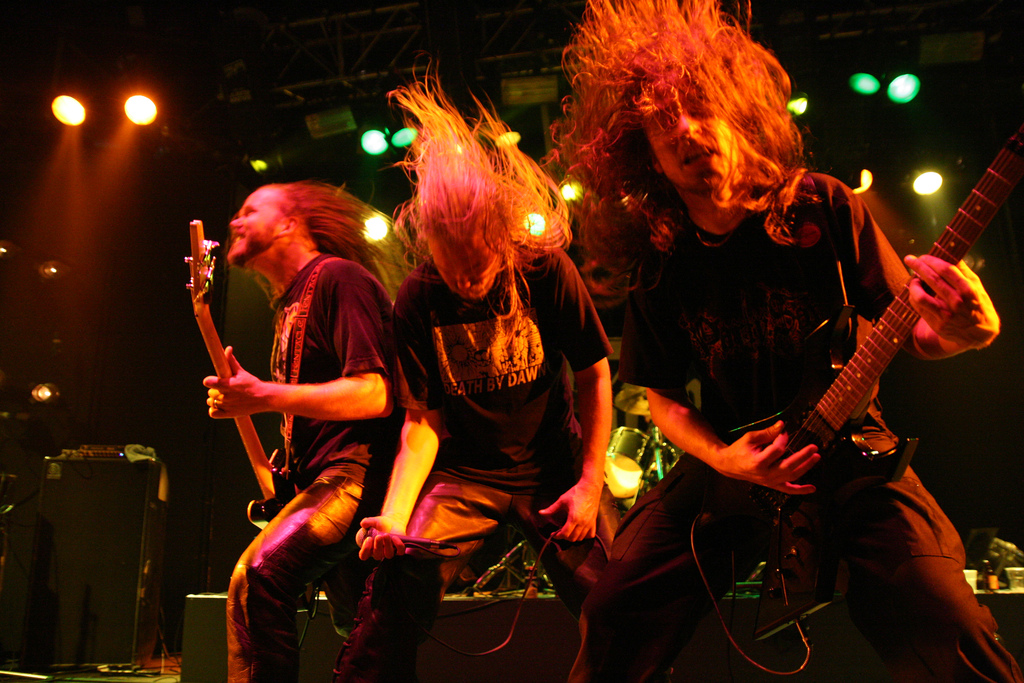
Asphyx headbanging during a performance.

At concerts, in place of typical dancing, metal fans are more likely to mosh and headbang (a movement in which the head is shaken up and down in time with the music).

Fans in the heavy metal subculture often make the corna hand gesture formed by a fist with the index and little fingers extended. Also known as the "devil's horns," the "metal fist," and other similar descriptors, the gesture was invented by heavy metal vocalist Ronnie James Dio.

=== Alcohol and drug use ===
The heavy metal scene is associated with alcohol and drug use. While there are heavy metal songs which celebrate alcohol or drug use (e.g., "Sweet Leaf" by Black Sabbath, which is about cannabis), there are many songs which warn about the dangers of alcohol and drug abuse and addiction. "Master of Puppets" by Metallica (which is about how drug abusers can end up being controlled by the drugs they use) and "Beyond the Realms of Death" by Judas Priest are two examples of songs that warn about such dangers.

=== Perceived intolerance to non-metal musical styles ===
Music critic Molly Meldrum noted sections of the heavy metal subculture who almost exclusively listen to heavy metal music. Queen frontman Freddie Mercury concurred with Meldrum's view, expressing pity for them.

Sepultura frontman Derrick Green said:

"I find that a lot of people can be very closed minded – they want to listen to metal and nothing else, but I'm not like that. I like doing metal music and having a heavy style, but I don't like to put myself in such a box and be trapped in it."

Anthrax drummer Charlie Benante admitted that hardened members of the heavy metal subculture "are not the most open-minded people when it comes to music."

Hardened thrash metal fans reacted negatively to Megadeth venturing into rock-oriented musical territory on their album Super Collider. Vocalist and guitarist Dave Mustaine stated that their hostility was informed by an unwillingness to accept other genres and had "nothing to do with Megadeth or the greatness of the band and its music"; he also argued that the labelling of music fans contributed to their inability to appreciate other types of music.

Opeth frontman Mikael Åkerfeldt also alleged that most members of the subculture are resistant to the musical evolution of artists within the genre, stating that it "doesn't seem to be that important" to those listeners. He added:

"I think most metal fans just want their Happy Meals served to them. They don't really want to know about what they're getting. For a while, I thought metal was a more open-minded thing but I was wrong."

Journalists have noted the dismissive attitude of many metal fans. Critic Ryan Howe penned an open letter to British metal fans who had reacted negatively to Avenged Sevenfold (whose music they deemed too light to qualify as metal) being booked to headline the 2014 Download Festival. Howe described the detractors as "narrow minded" and challenged them to attend the Avenged Sevenfold set.

Despite widespread lack of appreciation of other music genres, some fans and musicians have been known to profess a deep appreciation for non-metal genres. For example, many metal fans are also fond of punk rock, most notably the hardcore punk scene. Hardcore punk heavily influenced the development of extreme metal and its related subgenres as well as fusion genres such as crossover thrash, grindcore and the New York hardcore scene.

Fenriz of Darkthrone is also a techno DJ, and Metallica's Kirk Hammett is seen wearing a T-shirt of post-punk band The Sisters of Mercy in the music video for "Wherever I May Roam". Tourniquet band leader Ted Kirkpatrick is a "great admirer of the classical masters".

Deicide drummer Steve Asheim has stated that he appreciates and listens to classical music and plays piano. Cannibal Corpse vocalist George Fisher has stated he is a fan of country music artists such as Dolly Parton, George Jones, and Waylon Jennings. All That Remains vocalist Phil Labonte has stated he is a fan of the artists Prince, Fall Out Boy, Snoop Dogg, Dr. Dre, Eminem, Jay-Z and Nickelback.

The term metal elitist is sometimes used by heavy metal fans and musicians to differentiate members of the subculture who display insulated, exclusionary or rigid attitudes from more open-minded ones. Elitist attitudes are particularly associated with fans and musicians of the black metal subgenre.

Characteristics described as distinguishing metal elitists or "nerds" from other fans of metal music include "constant one-upping," "endless pedantry" and hesitancy to "go against the metal orthodoxy." While the term "metal elitism" is usually used pejoratively, elitism is occasionally defended by members of the subculture as a means of keeping the metal genre insulated, in order to prevent it from selling out.

Heavy metal is also known for its large quantity of fusion subgenres including nu metal, folk metal and symphonic metal - contradicting the notion of metal as an isolated musical genre. Many popular groups within the genre are also fusion-music acts not represented by any larger subgenre, such as Skindred and Matanza.

== International variations ==
Heavy metal fans can be found in virtually every country in the world. Even in orthodox Muslim countries of the Arab World, a small metal culture exists, though judicial and religious authorities do not always tolerate it. In 2003, more than a dozen members and fans of Moroccan heavy metal bands were imprisoned for "undermining the Muslim faith." Heavy metal fans in American and European Islamic communities have formed their own specific metal cultures, with movements such as Taqwacore.

Africa now has their own metal scene, inspired by bigger bands from the western hemisphere such as Metallica and Motörhead, putting their own twist on it by writing about their heritage and traditions. A band called Overthrust from Botswana played at one of the world's biggest heavy metal festivals in Germany called Wacken Open Air.

== Examples in fiction ==
Heavy metal subculture appears in works of fiction, mostly adult cartoons, and 1980s and 1990s live action movies.

- The 1986 film Trick or Treat stars Marc Price as Eddie Weinbauer, a metalhead that obtains an unreleased demo record of his deceased heavy metal idol with startling consequences. Guest appearances by Gene Simmons and Ozzy Osbourne.
- The titular characters of Mike Judge's animated show Beavis and Butt-Head are among the most notorious examples of heavy metal subculture in fiction, being fond of bands representative of, or marginally associated with, the style (such as Metallica and AC/DC, whose logos emblazon the T-shirts of the protagonists respectively). They also exhibit stereotypical metalhead behavior such as headbanging to songs they like, singing guitar riffs in response to good things happening to them, and deeming glam metal bands as "wussy". However, in a subversion of the stereotype that members of the heavy metal subculture are intolerant towards other styles of music, the duo are very responsive to hip hop music due to them finding it to be just as authentic.
- The film and Saturday Night Live program Wayne's World.
- Bill & Ted's Excellent Adventure is also a well-known example of heavy metal subculture in fiction, in which the titular characters are time travelers driven by the desire of keeping their band together.
- In the Happy Tree Friends episode entitled "In a Jam", the characters Cuddles, Lumpy, Russell, Handy, and Sniffles are in a rock and roll/heavy metal band. In that episode, they also have a stereotypical metalhead/rocker attitude such as being rude to people auditioning to be in the band, being careless, and even having some hand gestures that belong to the subculture.
- The 1999 film Detroit Rock City tells the story of four teenage friends, set in the 1970s, who are trying to go see their idols Kiss in concert.
- In an episode of Family Guy entitled "Saving Private Brian", Chris Griffin gets inspired by Marilyn Manson to become part of the heavy metal subculture and is mouthy to Lois and Peter.
- In one episode of SpongeBob SquarePants entitled "Krabby Road", Plankton makes a rock and roll/heavy metal band called "Plankton and the Patty Stealers" and gets SpongeBob, Patrick, and Squidward to be a part of it.
- The Disney XD sitcom I'm in the Band featured a teenaged boy named Trip who was the lead guitarist of a heavy metal/rock and roll band called "Iron Weasel"; the show also focused on heavy metal subculture in high school.
- The French-Canadian cartoon My Dad the Rock Star, created by Gene Simmons, featured the father, Rock Zilla, having a family belonging to the rocker/metalhead subculture. His son, William (aka Willy), is the main protagonist as well, but has trouble fitting in with his peers and family since he wants to live a more normal lifestyle.
- The Death Metal Epic is a series of comic novels by the writer Dean Swinford. The books tell the story of a death metal guitarist from Florida and is set in the early 1990s, a timeframe in which the genre thrived in the location.
- The 2001 film Rock Star, starring Mark Wahlberg and Jennifer Aniston, features a fictional heavy metal band "Steel Dragon", of whom the leading character eventually becomes the vocalist. This film is thought to be based on the story of Rob Halford's departure from Judas Priest in 1992.
- Metalocalypse, a TV show that aired from 6 August 2006 to 27 October 2013, features fictional death metal band Dethklok.
- Rodrick Heffley, the brother of main character Greg Heffley in the book series Diary of a Wimpy Kid (2007–present), is the drummer for a heavy metal band called "Löded Diper" that practices in the Heffley garage, much to the chagrin of his father.
- The 2009 video game Brütal Legend is set in a world inspired by heavy metal music, and features characters voiced, and visually inspired, by Jack Black, Rob Halford, Lemmy Kilmister, Lita Ford, and Ozzy Osbourne.
- The characters Johnny Klebitz, Jim Fitzgerald, Clay Simons, Terry Thorpe, Patrick McReary and Brucie Kibbutz, from Grand Theft Auto IV and its episodes, are all metalheads.
- The 2011 horror novel The Ritual by Adam Nevill features three metalhead antagonists named Loki, Fenris and Surtr who attempt to sacrifice the protagonist, Luke, to Odin.
- The 2018 adventure video game Detroit: Become Human features a detective, Hank Anderson, who is shown to be a fan of a fictional heavy metal band called "Knights of the Black Death."
- The 2018 film Lords of Chaos, starting Rory Culkin and Emory Cohen, is a historical fiction account of the early 1990s Norwegian black metal scene told from the perspective of Mayhem co-founder Euronymous.
- The 2022 film Metal Lords, its story follows two high school best friends and metal music lovers, Hunter and Kevin, who set out to start a metal band, against societal norms. It features special cameos by Scott Ian from Anthrax, Kirk Hammett from Metallica, Tom Morello from Rage Against the Machine and Rob Halford from Judas Priest.
- Season 4 of Stranger Things introduces senior Eddie Munson as president of the school's Dungeons and Dragons club. Eddie performs Metallica's "Master of Puppets" on electric guitar to create a diversion in the season finale.
