= No One Gets Out Alive =

2014 horror novel by Adam Nevill

- First edition UK cover
- Author: Adam Nevill
- Language: English
- Genre: Horror
- Published: 2014 (UK) Pan, 2015 (US) St. Martin's Griffin
- Publication place: United Kingdom
- Media type: Print, e-book
- Pages: 320 pages
- ISBN: 1447240901

No One Gets Out Alive is a 2014 horror novel by British author Adam Nevill. It was published in the United Kingdom in 2014 by Pan MacMillan and United States in 2015 by St. Martin's Press and focuses on a young woman who moves into a cheap apartment, only to find that she has put herself in danger by doing so.

== Synopsis ==
Stephanie Booth is a young woman who works various temp jobs and is always strapped for cash. Because of this, she has always had fairly poor living environments and she is overjoyed when she finds a decently priced apartment in the Perry Barr neighborhood. While she does have some initial misgivings about the decision, the positives seem to outweigh the negatives and Stephanie eagerly signs on as a tenant. Soon after Stephanie begins to experience several strange and inexplicable phenomena that make her start to regret moving in, as she hears odd noises and feels a presence that begins to grow more hostile with each passing night.

== Reception ==
Critical reception has been positive. The Lancashire Post gave No One Gets Out Alive a favorable review, writing that it was "a gripping, gruesome bone-chiller with resonant themes, a supernatural edge and an overwhelming sense of malevolence." Starburst and SFX both gave positive reviews and commented on the book's bleak commentary on poverty, and Starburst wrote that the book was "one that’s frighteningly relevant and all the more compelling for it."

=== Awards ===
- British Fantasy Award for Best Horror Novel (August Derleth Award) (2015, won)

== Film adaptation ==
On 8 September 2020, Netflix and The Imaginarium announced that they would be adapting No One Gets Out Alive as a film. Cristina Rodlo and Marc Menchaca were announced as part of the film's cast while Andy Serkis would serve as executive producer alongside Adam Nevill, Jonathan Cavendish, and Will Tennant. The film was released 29 September 2021.
