= Catriona Ward =

American and British horror novelist

- Born: Washington, D.C., U.S.
- Education: St. Edmund Hall, Oxford (BA); University of East Anglia (MA)
- Known for: Horror novels

Catriona Ward is an American-born British horror novelist. Her work has earned a number of accolades, including three British Fantasy Awards and a Shirley Jackson Award.

== Biography ==
Catriona Ward was born to English parents in Washington, D.C. Due to her father's work as an international economist, the family moved around and she grew up all over the world, including in the United States, Kenya, Madagascar, Yemen, and Morocco. Dartmoor was the one place the family returned to on a regular basis.

Ward attended Bedales School and went on to study English at St Edmund Hall, Oxford. Ward initially worked as an actor based in New York.

When she returned to London she worked on her first novel while writing for a human rights foundation until she left to take an MA in creative writing from the University of East Anglia. That novel, Rawblood (distributed in the United States as The Girl from Rawblood), was published in 2015.

Now she writes novels and short stories, and reviews for various publications. Ward won the British Fantasy Award for Best Horror Novel in 2016 at the British Fantasy Awards for Rawblood and again in 2018 for Little Eve, making her the first woman to win the prize twice. Little Eve also went on to win the prestigious Shirley Jackson Award for best novel. Her next gothic thriller, The Last House on Needless Street, was published through Viper Books (an imprint of Serpent's Tail) in March 2021, and Tor Nightfire (Tor Books) in the US, in September 2021. Andy Serkis and Jonathan Cavendish’s The Imaginarium Productions has optioned film rights to the book.

Ward lives in London and Devon, England.

== Awards ==
Among her literary awards, Catriona Ward is a 3-time winner of the August Derleth Award (Best Horror Novel) at the British Fantasy Awards.

Work	Year & Award	Category	Result	Ref.
Rawblood	2016 British Fantasy Award	Horror Novel (August Derleth Award)	Won	
Rawblood	2016 Authors' Club Best First Novel Award		Shortlisted	
Little Eve	2018 Shirley Jackson Award^{[a]}	Novel	Won	
Little Eve	2019 British Fantasy Award	Horror Novel (August Derleth Award)	Won	
The Last House on Needless Street	2021 Goodreads Choice Awards^{[b]}	Horror	Nominated	
The Last House on Needless Street	2021 Ladies of Horror Fiction Award	Novel	Nominated	
The Last House on Needless Street	2022 Kitschies	Red Tentacle (Best Novel)	Shortlisted	
The Last House on Needless Street	2022 British Fantasy Award	Horror Novel (August Derleth Award)	Won	
The Last House on Needless Street	2022 British Book Awards	Page-turner of the Year	Shortlisted	
The Last House on Needless Street	2022 World Fantasy Award	Novel	Shortlisted	
Sundial	2022 Bram Stoker Award^{[c]}	Novel	Shortlisted	
Sundial	2022 Goodreads Choice Awards^{[c]}	Horror	Nominated	
Sundial	2023 International Thriller Writers Awards	Hardcover Novel	Won	
Sundial	2023 Locus Award	Horror Novel	Nominated	
Sundial	2023 British Fantasy Award	Horror Novel (August Derleth Award)	Shortlisted	
Looking Glass Sound	2024 World Fantasy Award	Novel	Shortlisted	
Looking Glass Sound	2024 British Fantasy Award	Horror Novel (August Derleth Award)	Shortlisted	

Ward has also won the 2022 Sky Arts Awards "The Times Breakthrough Award" for Literature

=== Notes ===
^{a} "2018" is the listed award year for titles eligible; the ceremony was 2019
^{b} "2021" is the listed award year for titles eligible; the ceremony was 2022
^{c} "2022" is the listed award year for titles eligible; the ceremony was 2023

== Bibliography ==
=== Novels ===
- —— (2015). Rawblood (hardcover 1st ed.). Weidenfeld & Nicolson. ISBN 9780297609643. UK
- —— (2018). Little Eve (hardcover 1st ed.). Weidenfeld & Nicolson. ISBN 9780297609674.
- —— (2021). The Last House on Needless Street (hardcover ed.). Viper. ISBN 9781788166164.
- —— (2022). Sundial (hardcover ed.). Tor Nightfire. ISBN 9781250812681.
- —— (2023). Looking Glass Sound (hardcover ed.). Tor Nightfire. ISBN 9781250860026.
- —— (2026). Nowhere Burning (hardcover ed.). Tor Nightfire. ISBN 978-1250860057.

==== American editions ====
- —— (2017). The Girl from Rawblood (paperback ed.). Sourcebooks Landmark. ISBN 9781492637424. USA

=== Short fiction ===
Year	Title	First published	Reprinted	Notes
2018	"The Pier at Ardentinny"	"The Pier at Ardentinny". This Dreaming Isle. Unsung Stories: 11–24. 2018. ISBN 978-1907389597.		
2018	"Sentinel"	"Sentinel". New Fears 2. Titan Books. 2018. ISBN 978-1785655531.		
2018	"Lula-Belle"	"Lula-Belle". Phantoms. Titan Books: 129–138. 2018. ISBN 978-1785657948.		
2019	"Black Kitty"	"Black Kitty". Wonderland. Titan Books. 2019. ISBN 978-1789091489.		
2020	"At That Age"	"At That Age". Cursed. Titan Books. 2020. ISBN 978-1789091502.		
2020	"Slipper"	"Slipper". Dark and Stormy Nights. Black Shuck Books: 161–176. 2020. ISBN 978-1913038441.		
