= Banquet for the Damned =

2004 horror novel by Adam Nevill

- First edition
- Author: Adam Nevill
- Language: English
- Genre: Horror
- Published: 2004, PS Publishing; 2008, Virgin Books; 2014, Pan
- Publication place: United Kingdom
- Media type: Print, ebook
- Pages: 416
- ISBN: 0753513587

Banquet for the Damned is a 2004 horror novel by British author Adam Nevill. His debut novel, it was first published in 2004 by PS Publishing (where Nevill was credited as Adam L. G. Nevill), was re-published in 2008 through Virgin Books, and again in 2014 through Pan.

== Synopsis ==
Dante and Tom are a pair of musicians that have hit rock bottom in their personal lives and in their career. Their friendship is also strained due to Tom, a confirmed lothario, romancing a woman that Dante loved – and then leaving her in favor of accompanying Dante on a trip to St Andrews to meet Eliot Coldwell, a professor at the prestigious University of St Andrews. He is also the author of the book Banquet for the Damned, which has had a particularly strong influence on Dante. However, the two are unaware that there have been a series of strange deaths and disappearances plaguing the area, the only clue to their deaths being that they were students plagued by night terrors prior to their demise. Once at St Andrews Dante is both drawn to and disappointed by Coldwell but is especially taken by his assistant Beth, a mysterious young woman with a strange aura to her. Soon after Dante finds himself obsessed with her, to the point where he ends up nearly shattering his friendship with Tom when he grows jealous over the idea that Tom has pursued her. This jealousy is further spurred by the knowledge that Tom left Dante's old crush because he had gotten her pregnant and she wanted more of a commitment.

Meanwhile an American anthropology researcher and writer named Hart Miller has begun investigating the missing and dead students, as the case has piqued his interest. He manages to interview several of the students, eventually discovering that they all had one thing in common – they had all belonged to a group led by Coldwell. It is eventually uncovered that the group had taken part in an occult ritual, one that had terrified every member, caused Beth to be possibly possessed by an evil spirit, and unleashed an ancient, hungry being that has since pursued the students one by one, a being that Hart refers to as the Brown Man. As more and more strange events begin to unfold around him, Dante begins to research Coldwell's past himself and comes across Miller, who tells him that it is up to them to stop this ancient being, as it has marked them both for death.

== Reception ==
Critical reception for Banquet For the Damned has been positive. The work has received praise from Den of Geek and SciFiNow, the latter stating that while the book's dialogue was stiff, the setting was excellently done and that it was overall well worth reading. The Western Star also praised the novel, citing that it had strong characters and writing that "At essence it is a story of supernatural revenge, with a very authentic and convincing edge."
