= The Ritual (novel) =

2011 horror novel by Adam Nevill

- First edition cover for the UK and US
- Author: Adam Nevill
- Language: English
- Genre: Horror
- Published: 2011 (UK), Pan Macmillan; 2012 (USA) St. Martin's Griffin
- Publication place: United Kingdom
- Media type: Print, e-book
- Pages: 712 pages
- Awards: British Fantasy Award for Best Horror Novel (August Derleth Award)
- ISBN: 0330514970

The Ritual is a 2011 British horror novel by Adam Nevill. The book was first released in the United Kingdom on 7 October 2011 through Pan Macmillan and was released in the United States on 14 February 2012 through Macmillan imprint St. Martin's Griffin. It is Nevill's third published novel and was followed by his 2012 work Last Days. The Ritual is the winner of the 2012 British Fantasy Award for Best Horror Novel (August Derleth Award).

Film rights to The Ritual were optioned by Stillking Films, before being passed to Imaginarium. A film adaptation directed by David Bruckner and starring Rafe Spall and Robert James-Collier was released in cinemas on 13 October 2017.

== Plot ==
Old university friends Dom, Phil, Luke, and Hutch have decided to reunite on a hiking trip through the Swedish mountains. The trip was chosen for its frugality due to the fact that Luke is unable to afford much else. The group is forced to take a shortcut through the woods when Phil develops blisters on his feet and Dom injures his knee. However, the shortcut ends up causing the group to become lost and scared, especially after they discover a disembowelled animal corpse hanging from the trees. They come across an ancient shack filled with bones and artifacts. They also find an abandoned church, desecrated and repurposed for pagan practices. Hutch falls through the floor of the church as he and Luke explore it, and find a massive amount of human remains, belonging to adults and children, and animals. The four are disturbed each night with dreams - mostly nightmares - and visions.

There is much conflict between the four. Luke is the "odd one out", the only one who didn't get a career and settle down. Further rows reveal that Dom and Phil are about to get divorced from their respective wives. Hutch convinces Luke to leave them and press ahead for help, but before Luke can leave, Hutch is taken by an unseen entity, and the others find him naked and gutted in a tree. Phil vanishes next, and Luke and Dom later pass his body, treated in the same fashion. Despite sleeping in shifts, and Luke managing to hurt the creature with a rock, Dom disappears as well. Luke passes out and wakes up in bed in an old room.

He is attended by three masked and painted teenagers who call themselves Loki, Fenris, and Surtr. They are moonshiners and in a black metal band named Blood Frenzy. There is also an old woman who supervises the children, and Luke hears faint scuttling from the attic overhead. Luke hopes his hosts will call help but realises that they are complicit with the entity that killed his friends. When they take him outside to see Dom's body gutted in the trees, he attempts and fails to escape. Loki claims that they are Vikings and tells Luke that he will be sacrificed to Odin. Luke mocks Blood Frenzy as disturbed delinquents until they take him to the attic to see the "ancient ones": centuries-old humanoids with goats' legs, tended to by the old woman.

Luke is bathed and prepared for sacrifice by the old woman and tied to an upside-down cross before a pyre. As he screams defiant taunts, Blood Frenzy demands that the old woman summon the god, but she silently refuses. Luke wakes up back in his room, untied, and is given back his Swiss army knife by the old woman. Acquiring the teenagers' rifle, Luke kills Loki and Fenris, and Surtr flees into the woods. While searching for the keys to their truck, Luke hears the old woman singing in Swedish, summoning the creature which she calls "Moder", the word for "Mother". Luke realises she was using him to get rid of the teenagers for her and that he is still a sacrifice. He shoots her and sees that she, too, has goat legs.

Luke goes to the attic and kills the ancient ones, putting an end to Moder's cult. Outside, he hears the enraged Moder killing Surtr and coming for him. Luke drives the truck through the woods and finally confronts Moder, a giant goat-like beast with human arms. Moder tears apart the truck to get to Luke, but Luke stabs her in the throat, driving her off. Luke staggers, naked, through and out of the forest, stalked by Moder's "white children". Upon a rocky plain, Luke descends into a delirium and decides that, despite the many downsides of his life in London, the only thing that matters is being alive.

== Reception ==
Critical reception for The Ritual has been mostly positive. The South African paper Independent Online praised the work as "intense and creepy" and commented that it would work well as a horror film. HorrorNews.net also praised The Ritual, commenting "Nevill's writing style is top-notch and he is one of those guys who can just naturally tell a good story with little to no effort." Tor.com commented that "Nevill does a good job exploiting the isolation, dreariness, and enormous age of the Swedish forest setting", but also expressed a desire that the "most intriguing ideas [were] more thoroughly explored".

== Awards ==
- British Fantasy Award for Best Horror Novel (August Derleth Award) (2012, won)

== Film adaptation ==
Netflix adapted The Ritual as a film that was released in 2017.
