= Robin Cavendish =

British disability advocate

- Born: Robin Francis Cavendish; March 12, 1930; Middleton, Derbyshire, England
- Died: August 8, 1994 (aged 64); Drayton St Leonard, Oxfordshire, England
- Occupations: Advocate for disabled people Developer of medical aids for paralyzed people
- Spouse: Diana Blacker (m. 1957)
- Children: Jonathan Cavendish

Robin Francis Cavendish, MBE (12 March 1930 – 8 August 1994), was a British advocate for disabled people, medical aid developer, and one of the longest-lived responauts (Note: A person permanently dependent upon a mechanical ventilator to maintain breathing.) in Britain. Born in Middleton, Derbyshire, Cavendish was affected by polio at the age of 28. Despite being initially given only three months to live, Cavendish, paralysed from the neck down and able to breathe only with the use of a mechanical ventilator, became a tireless advocate for disabled people, instrumental in organising the first records of the number of responauts in Britain and helping to develop numerous devices to provide independence to paralyzed people. He was a member of the Cavendish family.

== Early life and career ==
Robin Francis Cavendish was born 12 March 1930 in Middleton, Derbyshire, England. He attended Winchester College. He attended Royal Military Academy Sandhurst and was commissioned into the 60th Rifles, of the King's Royal Rifle Corps, spending seven years in the Army, eventually attaining the rank of captain. He left the Army to join Thompson Smithett in starting up a tea-broking business in Kenya. In 1957, he married Diana Blacker and returned to Kenya. They had a son, Jonathan.

== Polio diagnosis and subsequent career ==
In December 1958, while in Kenya, Cavendish became ill with polio. Because he was paralysed from the neck down, a Nairobi doctor put him on a mechanical respirator that Cavendish needed to breathe, making him a "responaut". Cavendish flew back to England. He was initially given only three months, and then one year, to live. Against the advice of his doctors, he left the hospital after a year.

For the remainder of his life, Cavendish and his wife worked not only to improve the quality of his life, but the lives of other paralysed people, travelling the world to inspire others as campaigners for disabled people. Cavendish would often serve as the expert who explained his condition to consultants and nurses. In the 1960s, he tracked down and listed the circumstances of all the responauts in Britain, compiling the first record of how many people were confined to iron lungs. His findings were bleak, so he launched a campaign petitioning the health department to provide wheelchairs like his to free people with polio from iron lungs. Over the years, he volunteered himself as a test subject for the development of voice- and breath-activated equipment.

In 1962, Cavendish and his friend Teddy Hall, the Oxford University professor, developed a wheelchair with a built-in respirator that freed Cavendish from confinement to his bed, which became the model for future devices of its type, with Cavendish eventually using a total of 10 different chairs. Determined that mobility should be available to other polio survivors, Cavendish raised money from the Ernest Kleinwort Charitable Trust for the first dozen chairs, and eventually persuaded the then British Department of Health to fund a series of chairs, which were manufactured by Teddy Hall's company, Littlemore Scientific Engineering. After testing them on himself, Cavendish helped to market pieces of equipment that improve the quality of life of disabled people. Most notable among these was the Possum, which Cavendish developed with scientists at Stoke Mandeville Hospital; it allowed users to use the telephone, turn on a television or adjust a home's central heating with only a left-or-right movement of their head. Others included a lightweight ventilator that ran on batteries, and a modified aircraft seat fitted with electronic aids. Littlemore received government funding to make another forty chair-and-ventilator sets.

Moved by the plight of families who could never go on holiday together, Cavendish and others, in particular polio specialist Dr. G.T. Spencer, the consultant in charge of the Lane-Fox Unit at St Thomas's Hospital in London, co-founded the charity Refresh in 1970 to raise the money toward the construction of Netley Waterside House, a holiday complex overlooking Southampton Water on the South Coast whose facilities provided for the care of severely disabled responauts as they and their families enjoyed the attractive surroundings. The facility opened in 1977.

Cavendish was appointed MBE in 1974.

== Personal life ==
Among Cavendish's pastimes was reading newspapers. Cavendish and Diana refused to accept his condition as a major restriction, travelling widely until a short time before his death. They often drove from Oxford to London in their specially adapted van, returning home late at night. They also travelled abroad to visit places such as the battlefields of northern France, and they enjoyed receiving visiting friends in their home. According to Alice and Tim Renton of The Independent, "Young people found him an irresistible ear to pour confidences into and his stimulating and down-to-earth attitude to problems helped many. His contemporaries would drive across country to ask his advice and enjoy his company. It was as if his sedentary life gave him a broader viewpoint and a sharper vision than the rest of us, and his capacity for laughing at, as well as with, his friends was healthily deflating."

Cavendish was described by the Rentons as "naturally unsentimental", with his love for Diana, Jonathan and daughter-in-law Leslie Ann Rogers both "well-concealed and totally evident". According to the Rentons, Cavendish "questioned mercilessly and passed on gossip as happily as he received it, but somehow the malice disappeared as it went through him. He had a natural graciousness: his lack of evident resentment at his own condition made helping him a positive pleasure."

== Death and legacy ==
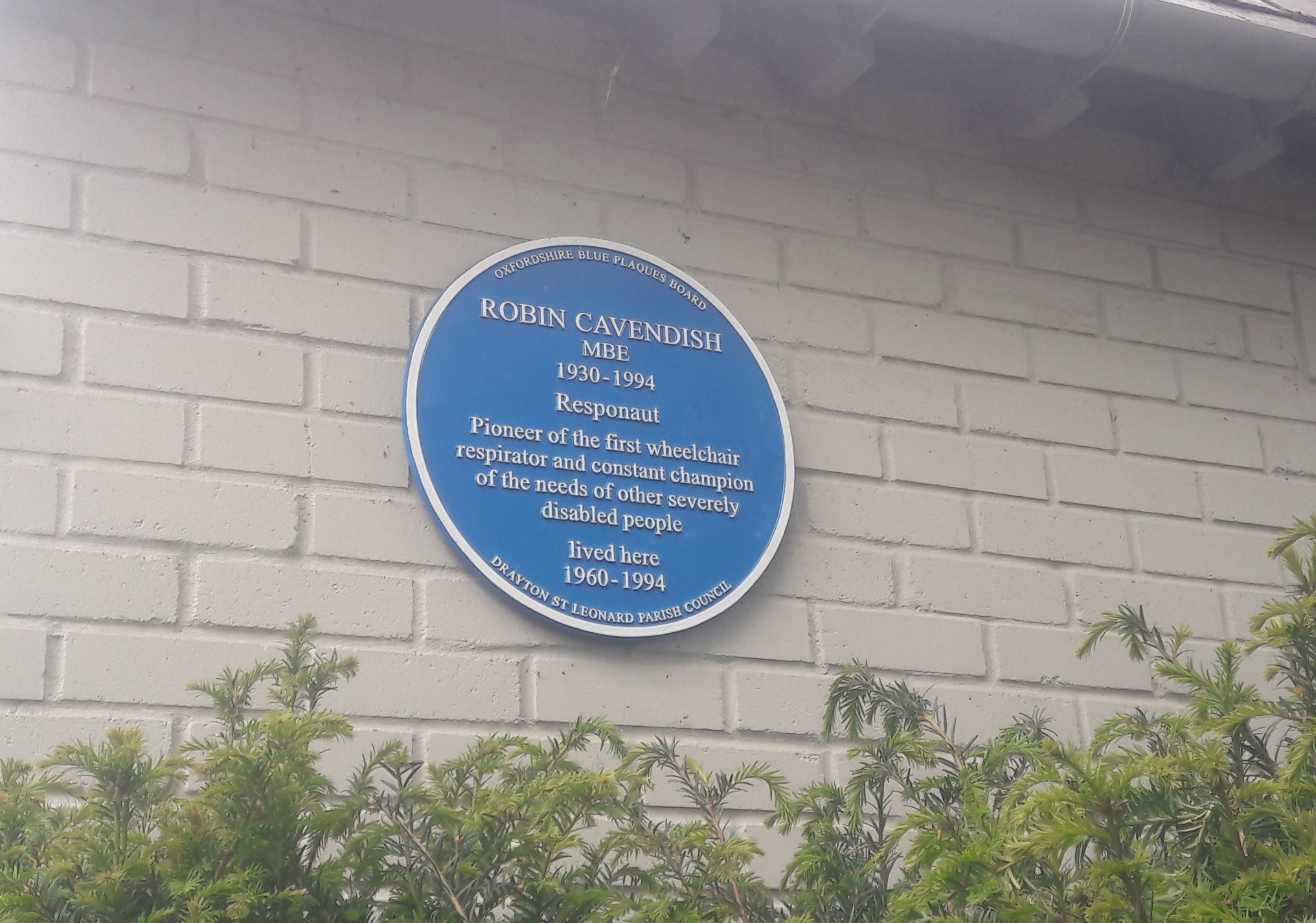
Blue plaque dedicated to Robin Cavendish, MBE (1930–1994), British advocate for disabled people, medical aid developer, and one of the longest-lived responauts

Cavendish died on 8 August 1994 at Drayton St Leonard, Oxfordshire, England at the age of 64, notable as one of the longest-surviving responauts in Great Britain. In their obituary of him, the Rentons stated, "To know Robin Cavendish was to know the personification of courage. Many people achieve moments of great courage, few are called on to show it continuously for 36 years."

On 27 November 1995, the Robin Cavendish Memorial Fund was created, with Diana, Jonathan and Leslie Cavendish among its trustees. Its purpose was to provide grants to individuals and organisations for the purpose of advancing the health and saving the lives of people with disabilities. In 2014, it was merged with the charity that Robin and Diana Cavendish had previously founded, Refresh, into the Cavendish Spencer Trust, which provides holiday and respite breaks for people with severe disability due to neurological or neuromuscular disorders. The Trust is named for Cavendish and his close friend Geoffrey Spencer, who aided Cavendish in his advocacy for disabled people.

In November 2017 Cavendish and Diana were awarded the Patient Innovation Lifetime Achievement Award for their work in developing innovations and advocating for people with disabilities. The award was announced by Nobel Laureate Sir Richard J. Roberts, a member of the advisory board of Patient Innovation and of the Jury of the Awards, addressed the audience in the Awards Ceremony at the Calouste Gulbenkian Foundation in Lisbon.

An Oxfordshire Blue Plaque was unveiled on his former home in Drayton St Leonard on 16 June 2019.

== In media ==
Cavendish's son, Jonathan Cavendish, a film producer who runs the production company The Imaginarium Studios with actor/director Andy Serkis, commissioned writer William Nicholson to write a screenplay on his father's life and work. The film, Breathe, which is directed by Serkis, premiered in October 2017. In the film, Cavendish is portrayed by Andrew Garfield.
