= The Ritual (2017 film) =

British horror film by David Bruckner

- Theatrical release poster
- Directed by: David Bruckner
- Screenplay by: Joe Barton
- Based on: The Ritual by Adam Nevill
- Produced by: Jonathan Cavendish; Richard Holmes
- Starring: Rafe Spall; Arsher Ali; Robert James-Collier; Sam Troughton
- Cinematography: Andrew Shulkind
- Edited by: Mark Towns
- Music by: Ben Lovett
- Production company: The Imaginarium
- Distributed by: eOne (United Kingdom); Netflix (International)
- Release dates: 8 September 2017 (TIFF); 13 October 2017 (United Kingdom)
- Running time: 94 minutes
- Country: United Kingdom
- Language: English
- Box office: $1.3–1.6 million

The Ritual is a 2017 British supernatural psychological folk horror film directed by David Bruckner and written by Joe Barton. Based on the 2011 novel of the same name by Adam Nevill, the film stars Rafe Spall, Arsher Ali, Robert James-Collier, and Sam Troughton as four friends on a hiking trip through a Swedish old-growth forest, where they encounter an ancient evil presence.

Following its world premiere at the 2017 Toronto International Film Festival on 8 September, The Ritual was released by eOne in the United Kingdom on 13 October.

== Plot ==
In a pub, five friends—Phil, Dom, Hutch, Luke, and Rob—discuss plans for a holiday. Rob suggests hiking in Sweden but gets rebuffed. Afterward, Luke and Rob leave to purchase alcohol but get involved in a robbery which soon turns violent. While Luke hides, the robbers harass and eventually kill Rob.

Six months later, the remaining four start a hiking trip along Kungsleden in northern Sweden in memory of Rob. After Dom injures his knee, Hutch suggests cutting through the forest rather than following the marked trail. Luke is against it but Dom insists that if there's a shortcut, they should use it. Upon entering the forest, the group comes across a gutted and hanged moose, and Runic symbols carved in the trees.

At night, a torrential rainstorm forces them to take shelter in an abandoned cabin. They find necklaces bearing similar symbols and an effigy of a decapitated human torso made of twigs, with antlers for hands. During the night, Luke has a nightmare about the robbery. The next morning, they awake to find Luke's chest bleeding from puncture wounds, Hutch screaming in terror and having wet himself, a catatonic Dom screaming for his wife Gayle, and a naked Phil praying to the effigy. Disturbed, the group tries to leave the woods through a side trail not shown on the map, despite Luke's protests. While discerning their location, Luke spots a large figure amongst the trees, but Dom doubts him. In their ensuing argument, Luke claims they wouldn't be in the forest if it weren't for Dom and Dom calls Luke a coward for letting Rob die.

As they continue hiking, they find an abandoned tent overgrown in foliage, with a backpack and wallet that has a credit card that expired in 1984. Everyone but Hutch sees it as a bad sign, but Hutch says they must be close to the lodge and on a path that others use. Later that night, the group is awakened by Phil's screams. Hutch is missing and his tent has partially collapsed. The remaining three search for him, but by dawn, they realize they are lost. Eventually, they find a gutted Hutch impaled on tree branches and give him an impromptu burial. Around sunset, Phil is dragged away and killed by an unseen creature. Luke and Dom flee. They find a torch-lined path leading to a small settlement. Upon rushing into a cottage, they are knocked unconscious.

Luke and Dom awake to find themselves restrained in a basement. An elderly woman inspects Luke's chest wounds, revealing she bears a similar marking. Two men drag Dom upstairs and later return him, beaten and bruised, to the basement. Dom says he will be sacrificed to the creature and urges Luke to flee. Later, while Dom is tied up outside by the townsfolk, Luke begins freeing himself from the restraints. Amidst the ritual, Dom hallucinates his wife emerging from the forest, only to realize it is the creature as it picks him up and impales him on a nearby tree.

A young woman explains to Luke that the creature is the giant moose-like jötunn "Moder", an ancient god-like entity and offspring of Loki^{[1]} that grants the cult immortality in exchange for sacrifices. Luke is to either worship Moder or be sacrificed. After she leaves, Luke frees himself and ventures upstairs. Armed with a torch, Luke finds a congregation of mummified worshipers that begin to move and sets them alight, burning the cabin, and attracting Moder. Luke heads downstairs and finds a hunting rifle, killing a cult member and taking an axe. The enraged jötunn kills the young woman while Luke shoots at it and escapes.

Moder pursues Luke, crippling his mind with hallucinations of Rob's death before catching and forcing him to his knees. Luke refuses to submit, strikes it with the axe, then flees. He runs towards the hill, seeing rays of sunlight, and emerges in an open field. Unable to leave the forest, Moder roars at Luke, who defiantly screams back. Knowing he is out of harm's way, he walks away and finds a road as Moder retreats into the dark forest.

== Cast ==
- Rafe Spall as Luke
- Arsher Ali as Phil
- Robert James-Collier as Hutch
- Sam Troughton as Dom
- Paul Reid as Robert
- Maria Erwolter as the Host
- Hilary Reeves as the Curate
- Francesca Mula as the Witch
- Matthew Needham as Junkie

== Production ==
The film was shot on location in the Carpathian Mountains of Romania.

The film's score was composed by David Bruckner's long-time friend and frequent collaborator, Ben Lovett. Lovett also scored Bruckner's 2007 film The Signal and 2020's The Night House.

== Release ==
The Ritual premiered in September 2017 at the Toronto International Film Festival, where its international distribution rights were sold to Netflix for $4.75 million. The film was theatrically released in the United Kingdom by eOne Films on 13 October 2017 and grossed over $1 million during its run. It was later released to Netflix on 9 February 2018.

== Reception ==
=== Critical response ===
On review aggregator website Rotten Tomatoes, the film holds an approval rating of 74% based on 96 reviews, and an average rating of 6.1/10. The website's critical consensus states: "Director David Bruckner makes evocative use of the Scandinavian setting and a dedicated cast to deliver a handsome — if familiar — horror story." On Metacritic, the film has a weighted average score of 57 out of 100, based on 18 critics, indicating "mixed or average reviews".

Katie Walsh of the Los Angeles Times praised the film and said that it was "Efficient and highly effective in its style, relying on sound, creepy production design, and the men's own fear and misjudgments to create the sense of pervasive doom." RogerEbert.com writer Simon Abrams scored the film a 2/4, saying "The most disappointing kind of bad horror movie: the kind that's too smart to be this dumb." Kyle Kohner of The Playlist gave the film a negative review, saying "David Bruckner had all the ingredients for a horror masterpiece—deceptively scenic wilderness shots, great character camaraderie, dreadful atmosphere/setting—but The Ritual winds up a missed opportunity."

== Notes ==
^{1} Moder isn't an attested Germanic/Norse deity. It's a fictional jötunn created for Adam Nevill's novel and brought to the screen in the film.
