= Apartment 16 =

2010 horror novel by Adam Nevill

- 2010 cover
- Author: Adam Nevill
- Language: English
- Genre: Horror
- Published: 2010 (UK), 2014 (US) Pan, 2011 (France) Bragelonne
- Publication place: United Kingdom
- Media type: Print, ebook
- Pages: 464
- ISBN: 0330514962

Apartment 16 is a 2010 horror novel by British author Adam Nevill. The book was first published in the United Kingdom on 7 May 2010. Apartment 16 took four and a half years for Nevill to complete, during which time he wrote seventeen drafts. Film rights to Apartment 16 were under option by Blind Monkey Pictures, the horror movie portion of Festival Film & TV, but have since lapsed.

== Synopsis ==
The novel is primarily told via the viewpoints of Apryl, a young American woman, and Seth, an English porter and artist. Apryl and her mother have recently inherited the estate of Lillian, Apryl's great-aunt, which includes an apartment at an exclusive London building. She's horrified to discover that her great-aunt spent her final years in squalor and mental instability, as the apartment shows that Lillian had become a hoarder after her husband's death. While going through the apartment Apryl discovers that Lillian had spent her days unsuccessfully trying to escape London and blaming a presumed dead artist named Felix Hessen for her inability to stray too far from the apartment. Bewildered, Apryl tries to investigate the mystery behind Hessen in an attempt to learn more about her great-aunt and in so doing ends up attracting the attention of supernatural powers inhabiting the apartment building. She manages to find out more about Hessen through a book written by a handsome older man named Miles, who is reluctant to believe Apryl when she claims that Hessen is still alive in some form and is inhabiting the building.

During all of this Seth, who works in apartment building, has been repeatedly drawn to Hessen and his now-abandoned apartment, apartment 16. He starts to interact with one of Hessen's emissaries, a young hoodie. Already depressed about his poor living situation and work prospects, Seth's interactions with the hoodie further push him into a self-destructive spiral of madness that is reflected in artwork that he creates due to Hessen's inspirations. However his revulsion over Hessen's supernatural influence eventually takes its toll and he tries to escape, only to find that any attempt to leave the city ends with confusion and further madness, identical to what happened with Lillian.

== Reception ==
Suspense gave a predominantly favorable review for the work, writing "This book will grab a hold of you and like the evil it portrays, won’t let go. It’s a thriller and a horror and the imagery within its pages will have you, up long into the night." HorrorNews.net gave Apartment 16 a recommendation, but commented that the shifting perspectives between Apryl and Seth was a little overly distracting. Publishers Weekly was more critical of the work and stated that it was overly predictable.

Sales for Apartment 16 have been high and the book was a bestseller in France, prompting its publisher Bragelonne to purchase the rights to two more of Nevill's work.
