= British Fantasy Award for Best Horror Novel =

British literary award

- Awarded for: Works over 40,000 words
- Country: United Kingdom
- Presented by: British Fantasy Society
- First award: 2012; 14 years ago
- Most recent winner: The Buffalo Hunter Hunter by Stephen Graham Jones
- Website: britishfantasysociety.org
- Related: British Fantasy Award for Best Novel; British Fantasy Award for Best Fantasy Novel

The British Fantasy Award for Best Horror Novel, also known as the August Derleth Award, is a literary award given annually as part of the British Fantasy Awards. The award is named after the American writer and editor August Derleth. The August Derleth Award was previously given to the best novel of the year, before the awards were reorganized in 2012.

== Winners and shortlists ==
* Winners

Year	Author	Work	Publisher	Ref.
2012	Adam Nevill*	The Ritual	Pan Books	
2012	Joe Abercrombie	The Heroes	Gollancz	
2012	Stephen King	11/22/63	Hodder & Stoughton	
2012	Kim Lakin-Smith	Cyber Circus	NewCon	
2012	George R. R. Martin	A Dance with Dragons	Harper Voyager	
2013	Adam Nevill*	Last Days	Macmillan Publishers	
2013	Ramsey Campbell	The Kind Folk	PS Publishing	
2013	Graham Joyce	Some Kind of Fairy Tale	Gollancz	
2013	Caitlín R. Kiernan	The Drowning Girl	Roc Books	
2013	Gary McMahon	Silent Voices	Solaris Books	
2014	Lauren Beukes*	The Shining Girls	HarperCollins	
2014	Joe Hill	NOS4A2	Gollancz	
2014	Graham Joyce	The Year of the Ladybird	Gollancz	
2014	Alison Littlewood	Path of Needles	Jo Fletcher	
2014	Adam Nevill	House of Small Shadows	Pan Books	
2014	Sarah Pinborough	Mayhem	Jo Fletcher	
2015	Adam Nevill*	No One Gets Out Alive	Macmillan Publishers	
2015	Rich Hawkins	The Last Plague	Crowded Quarantine	
2015	Alison Littlewood	The Unquiet House	Jo Fletcher	
2015	Emily St. John Mandel	Station Eleven	Knopf	
2015	Gary McMahon	The End	NewCon	
2015	M. R. Carey	The Girl with All the Gifts	Orbit Books	
2016	Catriona Ward*	Rawblood	Weidenfeld & Nicolson	
2016	Joseph Fink	Welcome to Night Vale	Orbit UK	
2016	Jeffrey Cranor	Welcome to Night Vale	Orbit UK	
2016	Tim Lebbon	The Silence	Titan Books	
2016	Alison Littlewood	A Cold Silence	Jo Fletcher	
2016	Adam Nevill	Lost Girl	Pan Books	
2016	Sarah Pinborough	The Death House	Gollancz	
2017	Paul G. Tremblay*	Disappearance at Devil's Rock	Titan Books	
2017	Sarah Pinborough	13 Minutes	Gollancz	
2017	Alison Littlewood	The Hidden People	Jo Fletcher	
2017	Ramsey Campbell	The Searching Dead	PS Publishing	
2018	Victor LaValle	The Changeling	Spiegel & Grau	
2018	Sarah Pinborough	Behind Her Eyes	HarperCollins	
2018	M. R. Carey	The Boy on the Bridge	Orbit Books	
2018	Alison Littlewood	The Crow Garden	Jo Fletcher	
2018	Tim Lebbon	Relics	Titan Books	
2019	Catriona Ward*	Little Eve	Weidenfeld & Nicolson	
2019	Paul G. Tremblay	The Cabin at the End of the World	Titan Books	
2019	Ramsey Campbell	The Way of the Worm	PS Publishing	
2019	Simon Bestwick	Wolf's Hill	Snowbooks	
2020	Adam Nevill*	The Reddening	Ritual Limited	
2020	Stephen King	The Institute	Hodder & Stoughton	
2020	Helen Marshall	The Migration	Titan Books	
2020	Alison Littlewood	Mistletoe	Jo Fletcher	
2020	James Brogden	The Plague Stones	Titan Books	
2020	T. Kingfisher	The Twisted Ones	Titan Books	
2021	Silvia Moreno-Garcia*	Mexican Gothic	Jo Fletcher	
2021	Premee Mohamed	Beneath the Rising	Solaris Books	
2021	T. Kingfisher	The Hollow Places	Saga Press	
2021	Stephen Graham Jones	The Only Good Indians	Saga Press	
2021	Emily Danforth	Plain Bad Heroines	Borough	
2021	Paul G. Tremblay	Survivor Song	Titan Books	
2022	Catriona Ward*	The Last House on Needless Street	Viper	
2022	Chuck Wendig	The Book of Accidents	Penguin Books	
2022	Premee Mohamed	A Broken Darkness	Solaris Books	
2022	S. T. Gibson	A Dowry of Blood	Nyx Publishing / Orbit Books	
2022	Stephen Graham Jones	My Heart Is a Chainsaw	Titan Books	
2022	Cassandra Khaw	Nothing but Blackened Teeth	Titan Books	
2023	Sarah Gailey*	Just Like Home	Hodder & Stoughton	
2023	Gemma Amor	Full Immersion	Angry Robot	
2023	Daniel Church	The Hollows	Angry Robot	
2023	Tim Mendees	Miracle Growth	Eerie River Publishing	
2023	Catriona Ward	Sundial	Viper	
2024	Stephen Graham Jones	Don't Fear the Reaper	Titan Books	
2024	T. Kingfisher	A House with Good Bones	Titan Books	
2024	Philip Fracassi	Boys in the Valley	Orbit Books	
2024	Grady Hendrix	How to Sell a Haunted House	Titan Books	
2024	Catriona Ward	Looking Glass Sound	Viper	
2024	David Green	One Life Left	Eerie River Publishing	
2025	Johanna van Veen*	My Darling Dreadful Thing	Poisoned Pen Press	
2025	David Barnett	Withered Hill	Canelo Horror	
2025	Daniel Church	The Ravening	Angry Robot	
2025	Tim Lebbon	Among The Living	Titan Books	
2025	Chuck Tingle	Bury Your Gays	Titan Books	
2025	Mikaella Clements	Feast While You Can	Grand Central Publishing	
2025	Onjuli Datta	Feast While You Can	Grand Central Publishing	
2026	Stephen Graham Jones*	The Buffalo Hunter Hunter	Titan Books	
2026	Grady Hendrix	Witchcraft for Wayward Girls	Tor Nightfire	
2026	Kat Dunn	Hungerstone	Manilla Press	
2026	MK Hardy	The Needfire	Solaris Books	
2026	Dan Howarth	Lionhearts	Northern Republic Press	
2026	Gretchen Felker-Martin	Black Flame	Titan Books	

== See also ==
- British Fantasy Award for Best Novel, formerly known as the August Derleth Award
