= Little Eve (book) =

2018 book by Catriona Ward

- Author: Catriona Ward
- Language: English
- Genre: Gothic horror, literary
- Publisher: Weidenfeld & Nicolson (UK), Tor Nightfire (US)
- Publication date: July 26, 2018
- Publication place: United Kingdom, USA
- Media type: Print (hardback, paperback), ebook, audiobook
- Pages: 252 (UK 1st ed hardcover)
- Awards: Shirley Jackson Award (2018); British Fantasy Award (2019)
- ISBN: 9780297609674 (UK 1st ed hardcover)
- OCLC: 1057609305
- Dewey Decimal: 813/.6
- LC Class: PS3623.A7315 L58 2022

Little Eve is a 2018 gothic horror novel by Catriona Ward, published by Weidenfeld & Nicolson.

== Publication history ==
The book was published in the United Kingdom on July 26, 2018. In 2022, following the success of Ward's novels The Last House on Needless Street and Sundial, it was republished by Tor Nightfire in the United States.

== Plot ==
The book is set on the remote Scottish island of Altnaharra, and the narrative, which begins in 1921 and develops over several time periods, deals with a close, quasi-religious community of six referred to as The Children, led by a character called Uncle. This cult worships a snake deity called the Adder, who they believe will pass on its powers to the most worthy follower. Uncle is abusive and exploitative, and the Children are deliberately kept apart from the outside world. The two protagonists, Dinah and Eve, are as close as sisters, but very different in outlook; Eve loves the island life, and Dinah longs for something more. When a young man delivering food to the community finds four of the Children ritualistically murdered, and Dinah the sole survivor, claiming that Eve is the culprit, an investigation ensues to discover the truth.

Narrated by both Dinah and Eve, the story spans decades, and reveals the horrors within the religious group, the relationships between the Children, their ambitions and dreams, and the abuses committed by the controlling but charismatic Uncle.

== Reception ==
The book was well received by critics, and was given a starred review in Publishers Weekly. Lacy Baugher Milas, in a review for Paste, wrote that it was emblematic of Ward's work in the horror genre. Gabino Iglesias, writing for Locus, similarly felt that it was "one of Ward's best books", praising the atmospheric setting and storytelling. John Mauro of GrimDark Magazine described it as "dense but absorbing, with a hypnotic quality akin to staring in the unblinking eyes of a giant snake." The book won the 2018 Shirley Jackson Award and the 2019 British Fantasy Award.

== Awards ==
Year	Award	Category	Result	Ref
2018	Shirley Jackson Award	Novel	Won	
2019	British Fantasy Award	Horror Novel (August Derleth Award)	Won	
