= Kat Dunn =

English author

- Education: SOAS University of London; University of Warwick
- Occupation: Author
- Website: katalicedunn.com

Kat Alice Dunn or Kat Dunn is an English author known for sapphic fantasy fiction.

Dunn's debut novel Dangerous Remedy (2020) is the first title in the young adult historical fantasy Battalion of the Dead trilogy.

Her fourth novel Bitterthorn was published in 2023 by Andersen Press. It was shortlisted for the 2023 Nero Book Awards Children's Fiction prize and the 2024 Children's and YA Polari Prize.

Her 2025 novel Hungerstone (Bonnier Books), a feminist reworking of Carmilla, won the 2026 Lambda Literary Award for Lesbian Fiction, and was nominated for the British Fantasy Award for Best Horror Novel in 2026.

Dunn graduated with a Bachelor of Arts (BA) in Japanese from SOAS University of London and a Master of Arts (MA) in English from the University of Warwick. Dunn speaks English, French and Japanese. She is queer and believes in the importance of telling lesbian stories, explaining that, "I'm not a lesbian – I'm bisexual, but most of my books have been sapphic".

== Bibliography ==
=== Battalion of the Dead trilogy ===
- Dangerous Remedy (2020)
- Monstrous Design (2021)
- Glorious Poison (2022)

=== Standalone novels ===
- Bitterthorn (2023)
- Hungerstone (2025)
- Rottenheart (2026)

=== Short stories ===
- "Something Wicked" in A Taste of Darkness: 13 Spooky Stories to Savour (2023), edited by Amy McCaw and Maria Kuzniar

== Accolades ==
Year	Award	Category	Title	Result	Ref.
2023	Nero Book Awards	Children's Fiction	Bitterthorn	Shortlisted	
2024	Polari Prize	Children's and YA	Bitterthorn	Shortlisted	
2026	Lord Ruthven Award	Fiction	Hungerstone	Won	
2026	Lambda Literary Awards	Lesbian Fiction	Hungerstone	Won	
2026	British Fantasy Awards	Best Horror Novel	Hungerstone	Shortlisted	
