= Lost Girl (novel) =

2015 novel by Adam Nevill

- Author: Adam Nevill
- Audio read by: Kris Dyer
- Language: English
- Published: 2015
- Publisher: Pan Macmillan
- Publication place: United Kingdom
- Media type: Print, e-book, audiobook
- Pages: 320 pages
- ISBN: 978-1447240914
- OCLC: 926095505
- Dewey Decimal: 823.9/2
- LC Class: PR6114.E92 L67

Lost Girl is a 2015 pre-apocalyptic novel by British author Adam Nevill. The book was published in the United Kingdom on 22 October 2015 through Pan Macmillan.

Of the novel's inspiration, Nevill stated that it came from "two great personal terrors: my anxiety about my daughter’s safety in almost every way a parent can imagine; and my ever growing anxiety about the consequences of runaway climate change twinned with overpopulation, but for our near future and not the future of distant generations."

== Synopsis ==
The book is set in 2053 in a world that has been decimated by severe climate change, pandemics, and rising crime and violence. It follows a man whose four-year-old daughter was kidnapped two years ago. The authorities are of no help because they must deal with all of the extreme chaos, so he must go out on his own to find out what happened to his daughter and rescue her from whatever her kidnappers subjected her to.

== Reception ==
Literature Works gave a favorable review for Lost Girl, opining "Adam Nevill’s powerful new novel seems at once a departure from his normal Horror trajectory, but in many ways it’s also a tour de force of staying to his course." Starburst wrote a mostly positive review for Lost Girl, stating "Lost Girl is sublime in its jaggedness. There may be times when it becomes too self-indulgent for its own good, but Nevill concocts a unique, paranoid vision of dystopian drama that’s nigh impossible not to get sucked into." Dirge Magazine also reviewed the novel, writing "I highly recommend Lost Girl. Even if you are tempted to bail out of the extremely bleak first half – and don’t misunderstand me there are still plenty of horrors left in the novel’s latter scenes – don’t do it, just keep going.

=== Awards ===
- British Fantasy Award for Best Horror Novel (August Derleth Award) (2016, shortlisted)
