= The Imaginarium =

UK film production company

- Type: Production company
- Industry: Film & TV Production
- Founded: 2011; 15 years ago
- Headquarters: London, United Kingdom
- Area served: Worldwide
- Key people: Andy Serkis, Jonathan Cavendish
- Services: Film production
- Website: Official website

The Imaginarium, also known as Imaginarium Productions, is a British production company linked to a digital performance-capture studio The Imaginarium Studios, founded by actor-director Andy Serkis and film producer Jonathan Cavendish in 2011. Since its creation the company has produced a number of feature films and high-end television dramas, including psychological thriller series The Girlfriend for Amazon, Scandi-vampire thriller Blood Cruise starring Tuppence Middleton, football comedy film Next Goal Wins, directed by Taika Waititi, starring Michael Fassbender and Elisabeth Moss, and for television Half Bad: The Bastard Son & The Devil Himself, written by Joe Barton, for Netflix. The Imaginarium's most recent work is an animated adaptation of George Orwell's Animal Farm, directed by Serkis and starring Seth Rogen and Woody Harrelson.

Serkis partnered with Jonathan Cavendish in 2009, opening The Imaginarium, a Production Company and Performance Capture Studio, after securing a permanent place at Ealing Studios in London. In January 2012 the studio signed an agreement with Vicon, the world's largest supplier of precision motion tracking systems.

In May 2017, Imaginarium Productions and The Imaginarium Studios was split into two separate companies.

The first feature film produced by The Imaginarium, Breathe, directed by Serkis (also the story of Robin Cavendish, the father of Serkis' business partner, Jonathan) and starring Andrew Garfield, Claire Foy, Tom Hollander, and Hugh Bonneville, was the opening night gala presentation of the 2017 BFI London Film Festival.

== Filmography ==
- Breathe (2017; production studio)
- The Ritual (2017; production studio)
- Mowgli: Legend of the Jungle (2018; production studio)
- No One Gets Out Alive (2021; production studio)
- Venom: Let There Be Carnage (2021)
- Next Goal Wins (2023; production studio)
- Animal Farm (2025)

=== Upcoming ===
- The Last House on Needless Street (TBA)
- Blood Cruise

=== TV shows ===
- Fungus The Bogeyman (2015)
- Death and Nightingales (2018)
- Half Bad: The Bastard Son & The Devil Himself (2022)
- Brilliant Minds (2024–26)
- The Girlfriend (2025)
