= Breathe (2017 film) =

2017 UK film

- British theatrical release poster
- Directed by: Andy Serkis
- Written by: William Nicholson
- Produced by: Jonathan Cavendish
- Starring: Andrew Garfield; Claire Foy; Tom Hollander; Hugh Bonneville; Dean-Charles Chapman; Ed Speleers
- Cinematography: Robert Richardson
- Edited by: Masahiro Hirakubo
- Music by: Nitin Sawhney
- Production companies: Silver Reel; BBC Films; BFI; Embankment Films; The Imaginarium
- Distributed by: Bleecker Street Participant Media (United States); STXinternational (United Kingdom)
- Release dates: 11 September 2017 (TIFF); 13 October 2017 (United States); 27 October 2017 (United Kingdom)
- Running time: 117 minutes
- Countries: United Kingdom; United States
- Language: English
- Budget: $15 million
- Box office: $4.9 million

Breathe is a 2017 biographical drama film directed by Andy Serkis in his directorial debut, from a screenplay by William Nicholson. It is based on the true story of Robin Cavendish, who became paralysed from the neck down by polio at the age of 28. The film stars Andrew Garfield, Claire Foy, Hugh Bonneville, Tom Hollander, Ed Speleers and Dean-Charles Chapman.

Breathe had its world premiere at the 42nd Toronto International Film Festival on 11 September 2017, and was released in the United States by Bleecker Street on 13 October 2017 and in the United Kingdom by STXinternational on 27 October 2017. The film received mixed reviews from critics, who praised Serkis's direction and Garfield and Foy's performances, but felt that the film was glossed over with romance, rather than focusing on Cavendish's disability and the lives of him and his family.

== Plot ==
In 1958 in Kenya, Robin Cavendish falls ill from polio at age 28, not long after meeting and marrying his wife Diana. Paralysed from the neck down and unable to breathe without the assistance of a respirator, he is given only three months to live.

Robin is repatriated to Britain. Initially, he is depressed, refusing to see his wife or newborn son, Jonathan, and wishing to be removed from life support. However, Diana is persistent, and slowly his spirits improve.

When Diana realises she can provide for his daily care and suggests they move Robin and the respirator home, Robin brightens considerably. Over the strenuous objections of the hospital consultant Dr Entwistle (who tells Diana that he will die if without the ventilator for two minutes) and with the help of some of the other doctors and nurses, Robin is brought home and meets his son.

While Jonathan is playing with his dog, the dog knocks out the plug of the ventilator. Robin realises, but unable to move or speak, he cannot get Diana's attention, so instead makes clicking noises with his tongue. Eventually, she finds him unresponsive and plugs the ventilator back in.

Seeing his son push a pram gives Robin the idea for a mobile chair with a built-in respirator. So, he enlists the help of his friend Teddy Hall to build one. Using the chair, and with the help of Diana and her two brothers, Robin is able to travel away from home for the first time. And, with a specially constructed van, the family begins to venture out further, even flying the van on a cargo plane to Spain.

Teddy makes various improvements to his design over time and eventually Robin teams up with Dr Clement Aitken to produce more of the chairs. Robin returns to his original hospital with more of Teddy's chairs, and the rest of the patients in the ward leave with him.

After observing a German hospital's prison-like confinement of their severely disabled patients, Robin then appears at a conference and appeals to doctors to treat their patients more humanely, drawing a standing ovation.

Years later, Robin begins to experience severe bleeding due to his extended time on the respirator, so decides it is time to stop prolonging his life indefinitely. He discusses his decision with Dr Aitken, who advises him that Diana and Jonathan cannot be involved. Robin holds a farewell party with his many friends. Some time later, he instructs his family to leave and return to the house at precise times.

Jonathan, now in his thirties, and Diana, watch Aitken driving away, and return to the house. Fading, Robin expresses his love for both of them and dies, having transformed the lives of many others like him.

== Cast ==
- Andrew Garfield as Robin Cavendish
- Claire Foy as Diana Cavendish
- Dean-Charles Chapman as Jonathan Cavendish
- Tom Hollander as Bloggs and David Blacker
- Hugh Bonneville as Teddy Hall
- Ben Lloyd-Hughes as Dr Don McQueen
- Ed Speleers as Colin Campbell
- Steven O'Donnell as Harry Tennyson
- Miranda Raison as Mary Dawnay
- Stephen Mangan as Dr Clement Aitken
- Jonathan Hyde as Dr Entwistle
- Amit Shah as Dr Khan
- Penny Downie as Tid
- Diana Rigg as Lady Neville

== Production ==
The Cavendishes' son, Jonathan Cavendish, who runs The Imaginarium production company with director Andy Serkis, commissioned writer William Nicholson to write the film's screenplay and is one of the producers of the film. He stated in an interview with London Evening Standard that in producing the film, he wanted to capture the "swashbuckling band of eccentrics" he knew in his childhood.

== Release ==
In September 2016, Bleecker Street and Participant Media acquired U.S. distribution rights to the film. In February 2017, STXinternational acquired British distribution rights to the film.

The film had its world premiere at the Toronto International Film Festival on September 11, 2017. It was also screened at the Opening Night Gala at the BFI London Film Festival. It was released in the United States on October 13, 2017, and the United Kingdom on October 27, 2017.

== Reception ==
=== Critical response ===
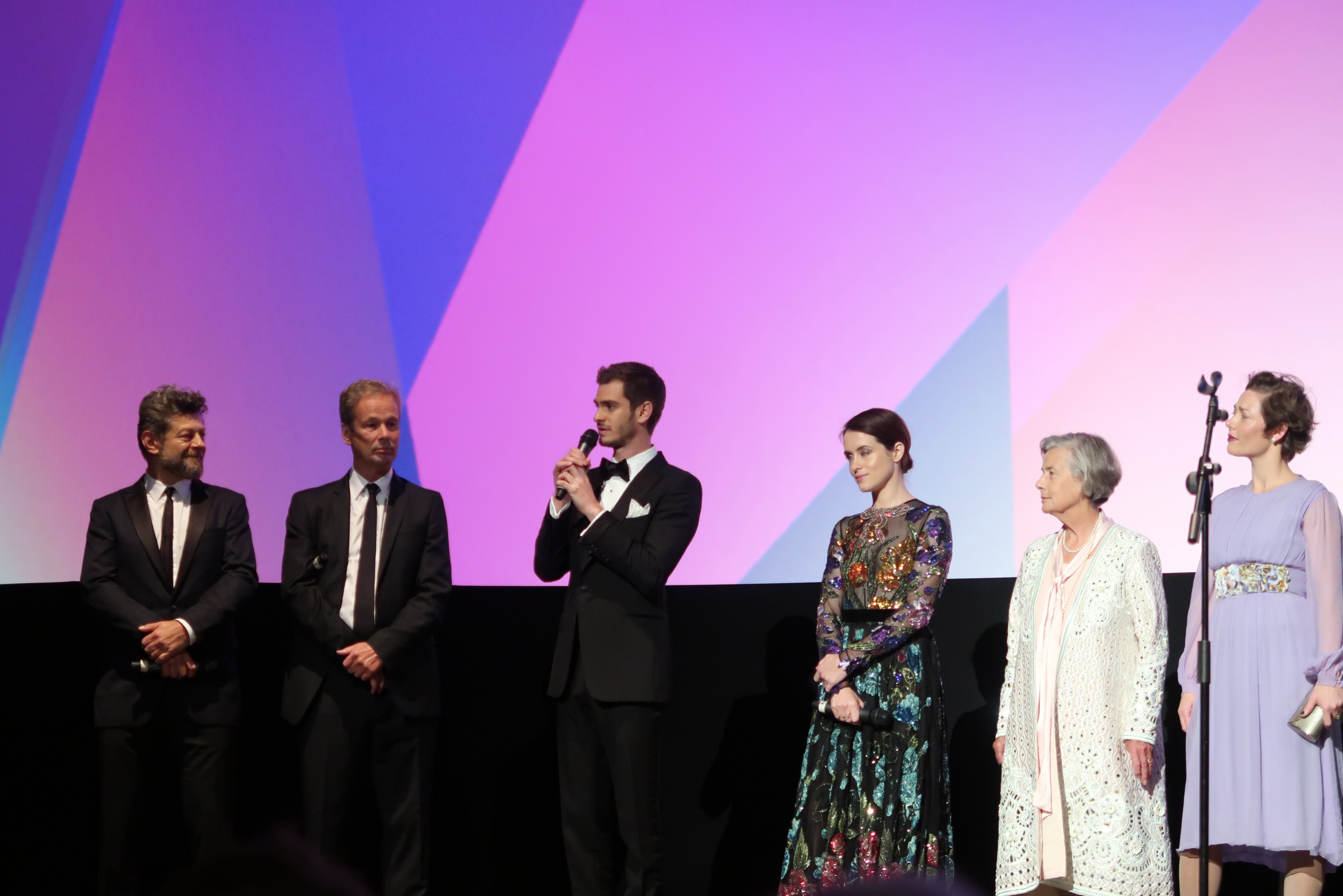
The cast of Breathe at the premiere for the film; in order from left to right Andy Serkis, Jonathan Cavendish, Andrew Garfield, Claire Foy and Diana Cavendish

Upon release, the film received generally mixed reviews. On review aggregator website Rotten Tomatoes, the film has an approval rating of 67%, based on 166 reviews and a weighted average of 6.4/10. The site's critical consensus reads, "Strong performances from Breathe's well-matched leads help add an edge to a biopic that takes a decidedly heartwarming approach to its real-life story." On Metacritic, the film holds a weighted average score of 51 out of 100, based on 29 critics, indicating "mixed or average" reviews.

Mark Kermode, writing in The Guardian, gave the film four out of five stars, praising Andrew Garfield's portrayal of Robin Cavendish: "There's real terror in Garfield's eyes as Robin stares into the abyss, spitting in the face of a hospital chaplain who announces that his suffering is somehow part of God's great plan". Kermode also gave praise to the film's score, and the role of Diana Cavendish's twin brothers, portrayed in a dual role by Tom Hollander.

Peter Bradshaw, also writing for The Guardian, stated that the film "highlights a vital chapter of history" for disabled people, while adding, "The problem is that there is not much light and shade in the Cavendishes themselves".

The New York Times writer Jeannette Catsoulis gave a mixed review, stating that the film's true purpose "is smothered by a cloying fairy tale romance that turns every challenge the couple faces into a lark". She went on to praise the actors, but stated that they were held back by the script: "Mr. Garfield smiles broadly through episodes of near-suffocation and bloody sputum, while Ms. Foy embodies the buck-up-and-carry-on mentality that William Nicholson's screenplay demands". The Hollywood Reporter writer Stephen Dalton wrote that the film "feels more like Downton Abbey with a medical subplot than a serious biopic about an astoundingly able disabled man and his devoted wife". Of the main cast, he stated that

"Breathe paints them as borderline saints, flattening their humanity and carefully glossing over potentially tricky subjects, notably sexual matters. Foy's performance, perky with a hint of steel, mostly rises above these limitations. But Garfield is inevitably hampered by a role that restricts him to little more than nodding and grinning. Tom Hollander also does double duty as Diana's twin brothers, his dual role seemingly an excuse for some creaky comic banter and slick visual effects".

Toby Woollaston in The New Zealand Herald praised Serkis's directing, suggesting that "his attention to the film's technical minutia elevates it beyond a mere actorly drama". He also praised the cast, specifically Garfield, who "climbs wholeheartedly into the role of Robin and delivers a convincing performance despite only having his face to act with".

IndieWire writer Eric Kohn praised Garfield and Foy's performances, noting that "Foy [...] gives a fragile, sincere performance as Robin's endlessly supportive partner, but Garfield ultimately emerges as the real draw. With subtle facial tics, he's able to convey a range of attitudes that serve as the movie's soulful core". The Sydney Morning Herald writer Sandra Hall agreed that the movie is one of the "cheeriest", and "there are times when the film's unassailable optimism gets in the way of its credibility".

Los Angeles Times writer Robert Abele called the film a "clichéd execution", noting that "Garfield and Foy, tasked with packing a whole marriage into one film, easily convey the attractiveness of being an indomitable team, but rarely get to plumb the depths of anything else".

=== Accolades ===
Group	Year (Note: Indicates the year of ceremony. Each year is linked to the article about the awards held that year, wherever possible.)	Category	Recipient	Result	Ref
British Independent Film Awards	2017	Best Make-up and Hair Design	Jan Sewell	Nominated	
British Independent Film Awards	2017	Best Sound	Breathe	Nominated	
El Gouna Film Festival	2017	Feature Narrative Competition	Breathe	Nominated	
Heartland Film Festival	2017	Truly Moving Picture Award	Breathe	Won	
Philadelphia Film Festival	2017	Archie Award – Best First Feature	Andy Serkis	Nominated	
