= The Revenge of La Llorona =

- Directed by: Santiago Menghini
- Written by: Sean Tretta
- Produced by: James Wan; Jason Blum; Gary Dauberman; Emile Gladstone
- Starring: Monica Raymund; Jay Hernandez; Raymond Cruz; Edy Ganem
- Production companies: New Line Cinema; Blumhouse Atomic; Coin Operated; Latchkey Productions
- Distributed by: Warner Bros. Pictures
- Release date: February 26, 2027
- Country: United States
- Language: English

The Revenge of La Llorona is an upcoming American supernatural horror film directed by Santiago Menghini and written by Sean Tretta. It is a sequel to the 2019 film The Curse of La Llorona and is based on the Latin American folklore of La Llorona. The film stars Monica Raymund, Jay Hernandez, Raymond Cruz, Edy Ganem, Martín Fajardo, Acston Luca Porto and Avie Porto, with Cruz reprising his role from the first film. While it is not considered an installment in the franchise, the film takes place within The Conjuring Universe.

The Revenge of La Llorona is set to be released in the United States by Warner Bros. Pictures on February 26, 2027.

== Cast ==
- Monica Raymund
- Jay Hernandez
- Raymond Cruz as Rafael Olvera
- Edy Ganem
- Martín Fajardo
- Acston Luca Porto
- Avie Porto

== Production ==
=== Development ===
On October 9, 2025, it was announced that Santiago Menghini would direct the film from a script by Sean Tretta, with Monica Raymund, Jay Hernandez, Raymond Cruz, Edy Ganem, Martín Fajardo, Acston Luca Porto and Avie Porto as the lead roles. James Wan, Emile Gladstone, and Gary Dauberman were named as producers.

=== Filming ===
Principal photography began in October 2025 in Buffalo, New York.

== Release ==
The Revenge of La Llorona is scheduled to be released by Warner Bros. Pictures in the United States on February 26, 2027. It was previously scheduled to release on April 9, 2027, but swapped release dates with Panic Carefully.
