= Rawblood =

2015 novel by Catriona Ward

- First edition
- Author: Catriona Ward
- Audio read by: Victoria Fox; Peter Kenny
- Language: English
- Genre: Gothic horror, literary
- Publisher: Weidenfeld & Nicolson (UK); Sourcebooks (US)
- Publication date: September 24, 2015
- Publication place: United Kingdom, USA
- Media type: Print (hardback, paperback), ebook, audiobook
- Pages: 320 (UK 1st ed hardcover)
- Awards: British Fantasy Award (2016)
- ISBN: 9780297609643 (UK 1st ed hardcover)
- OCLC: 921182942
- Dewey Decimal: 813/.6
- LC Class: PS3623.A7315 R39 2017

Rawblood is the 2015 debut horror novel by Catriona Ward. The book was first published in the United Kingdom on September 24, 2015 through Weidenfeld & Nicolson. The novel was later published in the USA on March 1, 2017 by Sourcebooks as The Girl from Rawblood.

== Synopsis ==
At the book's start Iris Villarca is an eleven-year-old girl growing up in Dartmoor during 1910. She and her father live in a mansion named Rawblood, where he keeps her isolated from the general population. Iris's father justifies this isolation by stating that he fears that she will die from Horror autotoxicus. However, Horror autotoxicus, a term labelled by Paul Ehrlich, was in fact not a disease, but instead a theory about a mechanism of the human body to protect itself.

The father of Iris lies about this and says that Horror autotoxicus had caused her mother's death and had been a reoccurring ailment for the Villarca family. Despite this restriction Iris ends up befriending Tom Gilmore, only to find that their fathers are enemies. Iris's father discovers the relationship and tries to bribe her to stay away from Tom by paying for her tuition to medical school. She accepts the offer, but as time passes Iris begins reading in medicine books and finds out that her father has made up his statements about horror autotoxicus. After this she learns from him that there is in fact a disease that runs in the family that is much worse than the made-up one.

== Reception ==
Strange Horizons reviewed Rawblood favorably, praising it for "deliver[ing] all the mystery and menace that one might hope for in a classic ghost story." The Historical Novel Society also reviewed the work, calling the writing "powerful and atmospheric". WHSmith selected Rawblood as a Fresh Talent title for Autumn 2016.

=== Awards ===
Year	Award	Category	Result	Ref
2016	Author's Club Best First Novel Award	—	Shortlisted	
2016	British Fantasy Award	Horror Novel	Won	
