= House of Small Shadows =

2013 novel by Adam Nevill

- Cover for the 2013 UK release
- Author: Adam Nevill
- Language: English
- Genre: Horror
- Published: 2013, Pan Books (UK); 2014, St. Martin's Press (US)
- Publication place: United Kingdom
- Media type: Print, e-book
- Pages: 384 pages (UK)
- ISBN: 0330544241 (UK)

House of Small Shadows (also stylized as The House of Small Shadows for its United States release) is a 2013 supernatural horror novel by English writer Adam Nevill. The book was first published in the United Kingdom on 10 October 2013 through Pan Books and was released in the United States on 15 July 2014 through St. Martin's Press. The book follows an antique appraiser that returns home, only to be confronted with the horror of Red House and with her own personal tragedies.

== Synopsis ==
The book follows Catherine, a young woman with a troubled past, and is set in the present day. Through flashbacks interspersed throughout the book the reader learns about her past, which is extremely complicated.

Catherine was abandoned by her birth parents in Ellyll Fields, a fictional small village near Hereford. While she did find an adoptive family, it is not a happy arrangement and they frequently questioned her mental health. Ostracized at school, Catherine only had one friend – a young mentally challenged girl named Alice that was also an outcast. They get along well until the summer of 1981, when Alice is one of several children that were kidnapped by the mysterious Pied Piper of Ellyll. Soon after her disappearance Catherine claims to have made contact with Alice's ghost, which prompts her adoptive parents to send her to therapy. As time passes a now adult Catherine forms a relationship with a man named Mike, but the relationship ends badly. Hoping to cause some change in her life, Catherine travels to London and takes a job with a prestigious TV network. However, her hoped-for change does not come to pass and she is fired from her position by a bullying co-worker named Tara.

Shattered by the experience, Catherine returns home and tries to once again rebuild her life. She takes on a job as an antique appraiser for a local handicapped man named Leonard and also manages to romantically re-connect with Mike. Things seem to be going well until Catherine suffers a miscarriage, which signals the end of her relationship with Mike, although she suspects that he really left her because he was seeing another woman. After an unspecified amount of time Catherine is persuaded to take on a job cataloging the contents of Red House, the home of the late M. H. Mason, a local eccentric known for his antique dolls, puppets, and morbid taxidermy displays. Once at the house Catherine is greatly unsettled by Mason's elderly niece Edith, her maid Maude, the house, and its contents. She is pressured to stay by both Edith and Maude, and reluctantly chooses to stay, despite her own reservations about everything. That night Catherine hears several odd noises that sounds like people walking around during the night, an occurrence that Edith later tries to explain away as Maude walking about. However these noises are only the first of a series of increasingly bizarre and strange occurrences.

== Reception ==
Critical reception for House of Small Shadows has been mostly positive, and the book received praise from Rue Morgue and The Independent. Tor.com and The Guardian expressed some criticism over the character of Catherine, as Tor.com found her past to be overly convoluted and The Guardian noted that her passive nature and "barely believable reasons why she can't or won't leave the house" did cause a "kind of stasis [that] freezes the novel". The Guardian gave the book a favorable review overall, while the reviewer for Tor.com commented that the character of Catherine kept them from enjoying the book as much as they would have otherwise. The reviewer for the Lancashire Evening Post gave a favorable review for the work, writing "Original, unsettling and genuinely scary, this is a book to be read only in daylight hours…".
