= The Imaginarium Studios =

Performance-led capture and virtual production studio

Imaginarium Studios
- Industry: Motion capture On-set virtual production
- Founded: 2012; 14 years ago
- Founder: Andy Serkis
- Headquarters: Pinewood Studios, United Kingdom
- Key people: Matt Brown (CEO)
- Parent: Cinesite (2023–present)
- Website: www.imaginariumstudios.co.uk

Imaginarium Studios is a virtual production studio formed in 2012 by actor and director Andy Serkis and film producer Jonathan Cavendish. It applies and develops performance capture and virtual production tools to create digital characters for film, television, games, AR, VR and mixed reality. The company operates from Pinewood Studios and Trilith Studios. A new performance capture volume was opened in partnership with SIDE at their studio 1 booth at Tileyard, kings Cross.

The studio is led by CEO Matt Brown, who has been with the company since 2016.

== History ==
Projects utilising the studio's services include films such as Guardians of the Galaxy Vol. 3, Men in Black: International, Spider-Man: Far From Home, Marvel's She-Hulk: Attorney at Law, and Netflix's Dance Monsters. Alongside its work in film and TV, the studio provides services to the theatrical and music industries. In 2014 the team collaborated with War Horse director Tom Morris to have the play performers re-enact the production while wearing motion-capture suits, allowing their body and facial movements to be digitally applied to 3D avatars.

In 2015, Imaginarium Studios worked with Coldplay to create the music video for their track "Adventure of a Lifetime", directed by Mat Whitecross. In 2023, Imaginarium Studios worked with Spotify to capture Stormzy performing tracks from his album, This Is What I Mean, the data was used to create a digital in-app concert experience with Rockstar Energy Drink.

In May 2023, The Imaginarium Studios became a Cinesite partner company. Cinesite provides services to the media and entertainment industries, including VFX and animation. In January 2024 the studio revealed its new brand identity.

== Productions ==
=== Film ===
- The Lord of the Rings: The Hunt for Gollum
- The Fantastic Four: First Steps
- Snow White
- Captain America: Brave New World
- Deadpool & Wolverine
- Damsel
- Argylle
- Napoleon
- Haunted Mansion
- Guardians of the Galaxy Vol. 3
- Eternals
- Venom: Let There Be Carnage
- Spider-Man: Far From Home
- Men in Black: International
- Mowgli: Legend of the Jungle
- Godzilla
- The Ritual
- Robot & Scarecrow
- King Arthur: Legend of the Sword
- Star Wars: Episode VII – The Force Awakens
- Avengers: Age of Ultron

=== Television ===
- She-Hulk: Attorney at Law
- Dance Monsters
- Neanderthals: Meet Your Ancestors

=== Music ===
- Stormzy - This Is What I Mean
- Coldplay - "Adventure of a Lifetime"
- Chemical Bros Live
- Bjork: Notget

=== Video games ===
- Unknown 9 Awakening
- Until Dawn
- Alan Wake 2
- Cyberpunk 2077
- Warhammer 40,000: Battle Sister VR
- Apex Legends
- Planet of the Apes: Last Frontier
- Hellblade: Senua's Sacrifice
- Battlefield 1
- Kingsglaive: Final Fantasy XV
- Everywhere
- Mindseye
- Ryse: Son of Rome
- Resident Evil Requiem
