= Little Eva (disambiguation) =

Little Eva was an American singer.

Little Eva may also refer to:

- Bill Lange, an American Major League Baseball player known as "Little Eva"
- Eva Coo, an American businesswoman and murderer known as "Little Eva"
- Little Eva, a character in Uncle Tom's Cabin
- Little Eva, a character in Little Eva: The Flower of the South
- "Little Eva", a song by the Tom Tom Club from Boom Boom Chi Boom Boom
- Little Eva (aircraft), a U.S. Army Air Forces B-24 bomber that crashed during World War II
- Little Eva, a cartoon series by St. John Publications
