= Last Days (Nevill novel) =

2012 horror novel by Adam Nevill

- First edition UK cover
- Author: Adam Nevill
- Language: English
- Genre: Horror
- Published: 2012 (UK) Pan Macmillan, 2013 (USA), St. Martin's Griffin
- Publication place: United Kingdom
- Media type: Print, e-book
- Pages: 544 pages
- Awards: British Fantasy Award for Best Horror Novel (August Derleth Award)
- ISBN: 0230757766

Last Days is a 2012 horror novel by the British author Adam Nevill. The book was first published in the United Kingdom on 24 May 2012 by Pan Macmillan and was published in the United States on 26 February 2013 through St. Martin's Griffin. It won the 2013 British Fantasy Award for Best Horror Novel (August Derleth Award) and film rights for Last Days were first optioned by Adam Storke in early 2014. The option has subsequently passed to another film production company.

== Synopsis ==
The book follows Kyle Freeman, a guerrilla documentary maker who has been hired to make a film about the Temple of the Last Days. The cult is notorious for a horrific massacre in 1975 and was rumored to have indulged in occult rituals. Its leader, Sister Katherine, was said to have been highly paranoid and lived in luxury while her followers lived in squalor. Kyle decides that he will focus on the various myths surrounding the group, film the various locations that they have lived, and that he will also try to seek interviews with various people that were involved with the cult to varying extents. However the further Kyle explores the Temple of the Last Days, the more and more bizarre and strange things seem to become.

== Reception ==
Critical reception for Last Days has been positive, and the work has received praise from HorrorNews.net and The Guardian. Tor.com and Bloody Disgusting both gave favorable reviews, and Tor.com wrote that "At its most powerful, Last Days is unputdownable: a non-stop docu-horror novel — ditto, a novel docu-horror — with a portentous premise, a pair of deftly-drawn characters to take us through its ill-lit outbuildings and at last into the eerie light, and staged along the way a series of solid scares, stitched together with good humour and a smart sense of self-awareness."

== Adaptation ==
In August 2026, Apple TV gave the series order of Ascension, which is inspired by Nevill's novel "Last Days", with Caitríona Balfe playing a documentary filmmaker Rose. Natalie Erika James, who is also lead director and Christian White serve as co-showrunners. The writers of the series include James, White, Alfonso Cuarón and Carlos Cuarón.
