= Mowgli: Legend of the Jungle =

2018 film directed by Andy Serkis

- Promotional poster
- Directed by: Andy Serkis
- Screenplay by: Callie Kloves
- Based on: All the Mowgli Stories by Rudyard Kipling
- Produced by: Steve Kloves; Jonathan Cavendish; David Barron
- Starring: Christian Bale; Cate Blanchett; Benedict Cumberbatch; Naomie Harris; Andy Serkis; Matthew Rhys; Freida Pinto; Rohan Chand
- Cinematography: Michael Seresin
- Edited by: Mark Sanger; Alex Marquez; Jeremiah O'Driscoll
- Music by: Nitin Sawhney
- Production companies: Warner Bros. Pictures; The Imaginarium
- Distributed by: Netflix
- Release dates: 25 November 2018 (Mumbai); 29 November 2018 (United Kingdom and United States)
- Running time: 104 minutes
- Countries: United Kingdom; United States
- Language: English

Mowgli: Legend of the Jungle (also known and stylized on screen simply as Mowgli) is a 2018 adventure drama film directed by Andy Serkis with a screenplay by Callie Kloves, based on stories collected in All the Mowgli Stories by Rudyard Kipling. The film stars Rohan Chand, Matthew Rhys, and Freida Pinto, along with voice and motion-capture performances from Christian Bale, Cate Blanchett, Benedict Cumberbatch, Naomie Harris, and Serkis. In this film, an orphaned human boy who was raised by wolves, sets out on a journey to find a human village while evading Shere Khan.

Talks of a new Jungle Book film from Warner Bros. Pictures began in 2012 and various directors, including Steve Kloves, Ron Howard, and Alejandro González Iñárritu, were approached before Serkis was confirmed in March 2014. Much of the cast signed on that August and principal photography began in March 2015. Filming took place in South Africa and at Warner Bros. Studios in Leavesden, England.

Originally scheduled to be released in October 2016 by Warner Bros. Pictures, the film was delayed numerous times to work on the visual effects and to create space between itself and the April 2016 release of Walt Disney Pictures's live-action remake of The Jungle Book. In July 2018, Warner Bros. Pictures sold the rights for the film to Netflix.

The film was released in select theaters on 29 November, followed by its subsequent digital Netflix release on 7 December of the same year. It received mixed reviews from critics, who praised the cast, visual effects, and Serkis's direction, but many compared it unfavorably to the Disney film and criticized the uneven tone, calling it a "messy—if ambitious—misfire".

== Plot ==
In the jungles of India, the gigantic Indian python seer Kaa watches as Shere Khan, a sadistic Bengal tiger, breaks "jungle law" by killing a family of humans. The black panther Bagheera finds a surviving infant boy and takes him to Nisha and Vihaan's family of Indian wolves, but the child is spotted by Shere Khan's striped hyena assistant Tabaqui.

The "man-cub" is brought before the wolf council, where Bagheera strong-arms Baloo, a Himalayan brown bear, into serving as his fellow guardian. Shere Khan arrives to kill the child, but Akela, leader of the wolves, declares that the boy is under the pack's protection. Shere Khan warns that when Akela misses his prey, he will return to kill the boy.

The child, now known as Mowgli, is adopted by Nisha and raised by the wolves, Baloo and Bagheera. Years pass, and Mowgli encounters Shere Khan, who has antagonized the nearby "man-village" by killing and slaughtering their cattle. Mowgli falls into a tiger trap set by the villagers, but is saved by Hathi, an Indian elephant missing half a tusk.

That night, Bagheera reveals to Mowgli that he is human, but Mowgli is determined to complete "the Running" – the trial to earn full membership in the pack. Bagheera urges Mowgli to leave the jungle for the village, where he will be safe from Shere Khan; watching the village from afar, Mowgli learns of the existence of fire.

The next day, during the Running as Bagheera chases the young wolves to prove their skill, Mowgli uses his ability to climb and run upright to gain the lead. Desperate to keep him safe, Bagheera unfairly foils Mowgli. After stating to Mowgli that he let his guard down, an enraged Baloo angrily confronts and berates Bagheera for his actions. After running off, Mowgli is kidnapped by the Bandar-log tribe of monkeys and brought to Shere Khan. Baloo and Bagheera arrive to save him. They are overwhelmed by the monkeys and Mowgli is rescued by Kaa. After Baloo heals him, Bhoot, Mowgli's albino wolf friend, attempts to cheer Mowgli up, but Mowgli, furious that he hadn't completed the Running, angrily lashed out at him, causing Bhoot to run away in tears before Mowgli, who felt remorseful for hurting his friend's feelings, can apologize to him. Later, he goes to visit Kaa, who believes he can restore harmony to the jungle.

While hunting, the elderly Akela fails to bring down a water buffalo, leading Shere Khan to remind the pack they must now challenge him for the role of leader. As the wolves fight, Mowgli steals a burning branch from the village and repels Shere Khan and the challengers, but shames Akela who regrettably advises him to leave. Mowgli is soon captured by the villagers and John Lockwood, a British hunter. One night, Bagheera visits Mowgli and tells him that he must stay with the villagers and gain their trust as he once did to escape captivity himself. Mowgli eventually starts to enjoy life in the village, cared for by the kindly Messua and learning hunting skills from Lockwood, who is tracking Shere Khan. One day, Mowgli's wolf-sibling Gray Brother visits Mowgli and informs him that Shere Khan has driven away the wolves loyal to Akela and continues to kill cattle, endangering all the jungle's animals, but Mowgli refuses to help.

While the villagers celebrate Holi, Mowgli soon learns that it was Lockwood who shot off Hathi's tusk and discovers his room full of hunting trophies, including the head of Bhoot, causing him to realize that Lockwood is not a nice person. Returning the tusk to Hathi, Mowgli offers him the hunter in exchange for ridding the jungle of Shere Khan. Mowgli meets with Baloo, Bagheera and the wolf pack, who refuse to go against jungle law to help him defeat Shere Khan. Undeterred, he lures Shere Khan to the edge of the village the next day where the tiger is surrounded by the elephant herd led by Hathi before fighting Mowgli. As Mowgli and Shere Khan fight, Lockwood shoots at the tiger, but wounds Mowgli instead. Akela sacrifices himself to save Mowgli from Shere Khan and is shot by Lockwood, who is overpowered and killed by Hathi while Tabaqui flees. The other animals, realizing the error of their ways, come to Mowgli's aid, forcing the mortally wounded Shere Khan to retreat into the jungle. The injured Akela names Mowgli as his successor before dying peacefully.

With Messua, the other animals, Kaa and the villagers watching, Mowgli returns to the jungle and slays the dying Shere Khan. Kaa narrates that with both Shere Khan and Lockwood gone, Mowgli has given the animals a voice and finally brought peace to the jungle.

== Cast ==
- Rohan Chand as Mowgli, a plucky and kind boy who is raised by wolves.
- Matthew Rhys as John Lockwood, a colonial hunter who hunts for trophies and comes to hunt Shere Khan.
- Freida Pinto as Messua, an altruistic woman who takes in Mowgli.

=== Voice and motion-capture ===
- Christian Bale as Bagheera, a wise black panther who is Mowgli's protector and one of his teachers who was born in human captivity.
- Cate Blanchett as Kaa, an enormous Indian Python who is the jungle's seer, one of Mowgli's mentors, and the narrator of the film.
- Benedict Cumberbatch as Shere Khan, a barbaric and sadistic Bengal tiger with a crippled front leg who is Mowgli's archenemy and the one who slew his biological parents.
- Naomie Harris as Nisha, an Indian wolf who is Mowgli's adopted mother.
- Andy Serkis as Baloo, a firm but fair Himalayan brown bear who is one of Mowgli's teachers and the teacher of the younger wolves.
- Peter Mullan as Akela, an elderly Indian wolf who is the chief of his pack.
- Jack Reynor as Gray Brother, an Indian wolf who is the oldest and most loyal of Mowgli's adopted brothers.
- Eddie Marsan as Vihaan, an Indian wolf who is Mowgli's adopted father.
- Tom Hollander as Tabaqui, a deranged striped hyena who is Shere Khan's follower.
- Louis Ashbourne Serkis as Bhoot, an albino Indian wolf cub in Akela's pack and Mowgli's friend.

== Production ==
A number of writers, directors, and producers were connected with the film during its development. By April 2012, Warner Bros. Pictures was developing the film with Steve Kloves in talks to write, direct, and produce it. By December 2013 Kloves was attached to produce and Alejandro González Iñárritu was in talks to direct, from a screenplay by Kloves's daughter Callie. Iñárritu left the project in the following month due to scheduling conflicts with Birdman and The Revenant. By February 2014, Ron Howard was in talks to direct, with Brian Grazer as producer through their Imagine Entertainment company. The next month Andy Serkis was hired to direct and produce the film with collaborator Jonathan Cavendish of The Imaginarium, and Serkis was also cast in the role of Baloo. Production designer Gary Freeman, editor Mark Sanger, and costume designer Alexandra Byrne were hired.

In August 2014, Benedict Cumberbatch joined the film to voice the villain role of Shere Khan. Christian Bale, Cate Blanchett, Naomie Harris, Tom Hollander, Eddie Marsan, Peter Mullan, and Rohan Chand were announced during that month. Jack Reynor was added to the cast in March 2015 as Mowgli's Brother Wolf, followed by Matthew Rhys in the role of John Lockwood in April. Freida Pinto was cast as Mowgli's adoptive mother.

Principal photography began on 9 March 2015. It was filmed in Durban, South Africa and at Warner Bros. Studios, Leavesden in England.

== Release ==
The film, originally titled Jungle Book: Origins, was initially set for an October 2016 release by Warner Bros. Pictures. Warner Bros. later shifted the date to October 2017, allowing more time for further work on the visual effects. In April 2016, just before the wide release of Disney's The Jungle Book, the film's release date was moved to 19 October 2018. The working title of the film was Mowgli: Tales from the Jungle Book, which was later changed to Mowgli. Serkis stated that the film is "darker" and more "serious" in tone than previous Jungle Book adaptations, thus closer to that of Kipling's original works. The first trailer and a behind-the-scenes featurette premiered on 21 May 2018.

By July 2018, Netflix purchased the worldwide distribution rights of the film from Warner Bros., who originally set the film for a 2019 release date, including a theatrical 3D release. At the time of the announcement, Deadline Hollywood described the film as "over-baked and over-budget" and said it allowed Warner Bros. to avoid "Pan-like box office bomb headlines" and saved them millions of dollars for not needing to promote the film. Speaking of the move, Serkis commented:

"I'm really excited about Netflix for Mowgli. Now, we avoid comparisons to the other movie and it's a relief not to have the pressure. I've seen the 3D version, and it's exceptional, a different view from the 2D version, really lush and with great depth, and there will be some kind of theatrical component for that. What excites me most is the forward thinking at Netflix in how to present this, and the message of the movie. They understand this is a darker telling that doesn't fit it into a four quadrant slot. It's really not meant for young kids, though I think it's possible that 10 or above can watch it. It was always meant to be PG-13, and this allows us to go deeper, with darker themes, to be scary and frightening in moments. The violence between animals is not gratuitous, but it's definitely there. This way of going allows us to get the film out without compromise".

The title was changed to Mowgli: Legend of the Jungle, and the film had limited theatrical release on 29 November 2018, followed by its subsequent streaming release on 7 December. The film had its world premiere in Mumbai on 25 November of the same year, the first time a Hollywood film premiered in India.

== Reception ==
On review aggregator Rotten Tomatoes, the film holds an approval rating of 52% based on 107 reviews, with an average rating of 5.5/10. The website's critical consensus reads: "Mowgli: Legend of the Jungle brings impressive special effects to bear on the darker side of its classic source material, but loses track of the story's heart along the way". On Metacritic, the film has a weighted average score of 51 out of 100, based on 22 critics, indicating "mixed or average reviews".

Kate Erbland of IndieWire gave the film a "C+" and wrote: "Too dark for kids, too tame for adults. Stunning effects, occasionally wretched motion-capture. The technology may be there, but that doesn't mean it's been used to its full, feeling powers. It's a coming-of-age story unable to push forward in all the ways that really matter". Similarly, The Atlantic's reviewer David Sims claimed the film suffers from weak visual effects and bland story.

Matt Zoller Seitz of RogerEbert.com awarded Mowgli two stars, criticizing the film's motion capture effects and comparing the film unfavorably to Favreau's The Jungle Book. Olly Richards of Empire gave the film 2/5 stars, writing that "for all his ambition, Serkis can't find the right tone for Mowgli and it becomes a very confused beast, neither fun enough for all ages to enjoy nor complex enough to be the visceral, grown-up thriller he nudges at". The Observer's reviewer Wendy Ide awarded the film 3/5 stars, praising the film's visual and technical effects but opining that there was too much trauma and animal violence to attract family audiences.

David Fear of Rolling Stone gave the film 3/5 stars, describing Mowgli as "a harsher, darker, more CGI-heavy look at 'The Jungle Book'". While criticizing the film's CGI effects, Fear praised Christian Bale, Andy Serkis, Benedict Cumberbatch, and Cate Blanchett for their voicework as Bagheera, Baloo, Shere Khan, and Kaa. Michael Sullivan of The Washington Post awarded the film 4/5 stars, praising Andy Serkis for combining motion capture animation with live action footage while cautioning parents not to watch it with their kids due to its adult themes and violence. Additionally, Robert Abele of the Los Angeles Times praised Mowgli for incorporating the darker and more mature elements of Kipling's The Jungle Book, also favorably comparing the film to Disney's two family friendly Jungle Book iterations and describing Mowgli as "the movie equivalent of a whiskey chaser after a sugary shake".

Rohan Naahar of the Hindustan Times awarded Mowgli 4/5 stars, praising Serkis for delivering "a nuanced, visually dazzling update of the Jungle Book for Netflix". While praising the film for its technical effects and mature themes, Naahar expressed disappointment with the under-representation of Indians in the main cast apart from Freida Pinto. Collider's Matt Goldberg described the film as a "blood-soak" version of the Jungle Book, and criticized the film's level of violence and unsatisfactory CGI effects, giving the film a D rating.
