= Jonathan Cavendish =

British independent film producer (born 1959)

- Born: 4 February 1959 (age 67)
- Occupation: Film producer
- Years active: 1987–present
- Spouse: Lesley Ann Rogers
- Children: 3
- Family: Cavendish
- Website: http://www.imaginariumuk.com

Jonathan Stewart Cavendish (born 4 February 1959) is a British independent film producer. He is notable for his work on Elizabeth: The Golden Age (2007), Breathe (2017) and the Bridget Jones films. He is a member of the Cavendish family.

== Early life ==
Jonathan Stewart Cavendish was born 4 February 1959, the son of Robin Cavendish and Diana Blacker Cavendish, who became disability rights advocates following Robin's paralysis by polio in December 1958.

Cavendish studied history at Oxford University.

== Career ==
Cavendish began his career in advertising. He was part of the marketing team behind Channel 4's launch in 1982. After joining Little Bird Productions in 1983, Cavendish has been responsible for acclaimed titles such as In My Father's Den (2004), Croupier (1998) and Trauma (2004), as well as numerous TV projects.

In 2011, he founded Imaginarium Productions and The Imaginarium Studios with actor Andy Serkis. The Imaginarium is a creative digital studio based in Ealing, dedicated to the invention of believable, emotionally engaging digital characters using Performance Capture technology. Cavendish had his motion capture "epiphany" while watching King Kong. "To the embarrassment of my children, I cried … and it was only afterwards when I looked up the movie and found out about it that I discovered that inside all of that was little Andy."

On 20 October 2012, the studio acquired rights to a new motion capture adaptation of Animal Farm. Cavendish will produce along with Serkis.

Cavendish commissioned writer William Nicholson to write a screenplay on his father's life and work. The film, Breathe, is directed by Serkis, and opened in October 2017. In it, Cavendish's father, Robin, is portrayed by Andrew Garfield, and his wife, Diana, is portrayed by Claire Foy. Bleecker Street and Participant Media acquired the domestic distribution rights to the film at the 2016 Toronto International Film Festival.

== Personal life ==
Cavendish is married to Lesley Ann Rogers. They have triplets, born in 1996.

== Filmography ==
=== Film ===
Producer

- December Bride (1987)
- Into the West (1992)
- A Man of No Importance (1994)
- Moondance (1995)
- Nothing Personal (1995)
- Croupier (1998)
- St. Ives (1998)
- Ordinary Decent Criminal (2000)
- Gangster No. 1 (2000)
- Bridget Jones's Diary (2001)
- Trauma (2004)
- In My Father's Den (2004)
- Bridget Jones: The Edge of Reason (2004)
- Churchill: The Hollywood Years (2004)
- Elizabeth: The Golden Age (2007)
- All Good Children (2010)
- Breathe (2017)
- The Ritual (2017)
- Mowgli: Legend of the Jungle (2018)
- No One Gets Out Alive (2021)
- Next Goal Wins (2023)
- Animal Farm (2025)

Executive producer

- Marie and Bruce (2004)
- Bernard and Doris (2006)
- Venom: Let There Be Carnage (2021)
- The Last House on Needless Street (TBA)

=== Television ===
Producer

- The Lilac Bus (1990)
- 4 Play (1991) (1 episode)
- The Hanging Gale (1995)
- The Writing on the Wall (1996)
- Death and Nightingales (2018)

Executive producer

- Dirty Tricks (2000)
- The Key (2003)
- Whiskey Echo (2005) (TV Movie)
- Fungus The Bogeyman (2015)
- The Bastard Son & The Devil Himself (2022)
- Brilliant Minds (2024)
