= Adam Nevill =

British horror writer

- Born: 1969 (age 56–57); Birmingham, England
- Occupation: Writer
- Writing career
- Language: English
- Notable work: The Ritual
- Website: www.adamlgnevill.com

Adam Nevill (also known as Adam LG Nevill) is an English writer of supernatural horror, known for his book The Ritual. Prior to becoming a full-time author, Nevill worked as an editor.

After publishing several novels through Pan Macmillan and St. Martin's Press, Nevill chose to self-publish his 2019 novel, The Reddening. Nevill stated that his reasons were both financial and creative, as he wanted more freedom in how he could market and package his works. The novel was published under his imprint, Ritual Limited, which he created in 2016.

== Awards ==
Year	Book	Award	Category	Result	Ref.
2010	Apartment 16	The Dracula Society	Children of the Night Award	Nominated	
2011	Apartment 16	British Fantasy Award	Novel	Shortlisted	
2012	The Ritual	British Fantasy Award	Horror Novel	Won	
2012	Florrie	British Fantasy Award	Short Story	Shortlisted	
2013	Last Days	British Fantasy Award	Horror Novel	Won	
2013	The Ritual	RUSA Reading List	Horror	Won	
2014	House of Small Shadows	British Fantasy Award	Horror Novel	Shortlisted	
2014	Last Days	RUSA Reading List	Horror	Won	
2015	No One Gets Out Alive	British Fantasy Award	Horror Novel	Won	
2016	Lost Girl	British Fantasy Award	Horror Novel	Shortlisted	
2016	Hippocampus	British Fantasy Award	Short Fiction	Shortlisted	
2017	Under a Watchful Eye	British Fantasy Award	Horror Novel	Shortlisted	
2017	Some Will Not Sleep	British Fantasy Award	Collection	Won	
2017	Under a Watchful Eye	Locus Recommended Reading List	Horror	Selected	
2020	The Reddening	British Fantasy Award	Horror Novel	Won	

== Bibliography ==
=== Novels ===
- Banquet for the Damned (2004 - PS Publishing)
- Apartment 16 (2010, UK - Pan)
- The Ritual (2011, UK - Pan, 2012, US - St. Martin's)
- Last Days (2012, UK - Pan, 2013, US - St. Martin's)
- House of Small Shadows (2013, UK - Pan, 2014, US - St. Martin's)
- No One Gets Out Alive (2014, UK - Pan, 2015, US - St. Martin's)
- Lost Girl (2015, UK - Pan)
- Under a Watchful Eye (2017, UK - Pan Macmillan)
- The Reddening (2019)
- Cunning Folk (2021)
- The Vessel (2022)
- All the Fiends of Hell (2024)
- Monumental (2026)

=== Collections ===
- Some Will Not Sleep: Selected Horrors (2016, UK and US - Ritual Limited)
- Cries from the Crypt: Selected Writings (2016, newsletter exclusive release - Ritual Limited)
- Before You Sleep: Three Terrors (2016, free eBook - Ritual Limited)
- Hasty for the Dark: Selected Horrors (2017, Ritual Limited)
- Wyrd and Other Derelictions (2020, Ritual Limited)

=== Short stories ===
- "Mothers Milk" (2004, published in Gathering the Bones)
- "Where Angels Come In" (2005, published in Poe's Progeny)
- "The Original Occupant" (2005, published in Bernie Herrmann's Manic Sextet)
- "Yellow Teeth" (2009, published in The British Invasion)
- "The Ancestors" (2009, published in The British Fantasy Society Yearbook 2009)
- "To Forget or Be Forgotten" (2009, published in Exotic Gothic 3)
- "Estrus" (2010, published in Raw Terror)
- "On All London Underground Lines" (2010, published in The End of the Line)
- "Florrie" (2011, published in House of Fear)
- "Little Mag's Barrow" (2011, published in Terror Tales of the Lake District)
- "What God Hath Wrought?" (2011, published in Gutshot)
- "The Age of Entitlement" (2012, published in Dark Currents)
- "Pig Thing" (2012, published in Exotic Gothic 4)
- "The Angels of London" (2013, published in Terror Tales of London)
- "Always in our Hearts" (2013, published in End of the Road)
- "Doll Hands" (2014, published in The Burning Circus)
- "Hippocampus" (2016, published in Terror Tales of the Sea)
- "Call the Name" (2016, published in The Gods of H. P. Lovecraft)
- "The Days of Our Lives" (2016, published in Dead Letters)
- "White Light, White Heat" (2016, published in Marked to Die)
