= Cottingley =

Cottingley may refer to:

- Cottingley, Bradford, near Bingley, West Yorkshire, England
  - Cottingley Fairies, 1917 photographic hoax
- Cottingley, Leeds, West Yorkshire, England
  - Cottingley railway station serves Cottingley, Leeds
- Cottingley (novella), a 2017 novella by Alison Littlewood
- The Cottingley Cuckoo, a 2021 novel by Alison Littlewood
