= Photographing Fairies (novel) =

1992 novel by Steve Szilagyi

- Author: Steve Szilagyi
- Publisher: Ballantine Books
- Publication date: 1992
- Publication place: United States
- Media type: Print (hardcover)
- Pages: 321 pp
- ISBN: 978-0345377517
- OCLC: 318090909
- Dewey Decimal: 813/.54
- LC Class: PS3569.Z48 P48 1992

Photographing Fairies is a novel by Steve Szilagyi. Taking place in the 1920s, the novel is loosely based on the story of the Cottingley Fairies and includes Arthur Conan Doyle as a minor character. The story dwells on themes such as magic, human sexuality, photography, and human perception.

== Plot ==
The novel is told in the first person, from the perspective of an American photographer named Charles Castle. Castle is currently held in a prison cell in England. He is to be executed the next day for the crime of murder. He recounts the events, which began four months earlier, that led to his imprisonment and death sentence.

Working as a photographer in London, Castle was visited by a constable named Michael Walsmear. Walsmear showed Castle two photographs, each of a different young girl, and asked Castle's professional opinion as to whether the photographs are genuine. Walsmear went on to point out several tiny spots in the photographs, and he insisted these spots are not dust or imperfections of the film, but instead fairies. Castle enlarged the negatives and looked at the splotches of light, which indeed resembled fairies. Walsmear only wished to confirm that the fairies were real, but Castle was strongly intrigued by the possibility of the existence of fairies. Castle then took copies of the photographs to Arthur Conan Doyle, who possessed a different set of "fairy" photographs. Doyle was not convinced by Walsmear's photographs with the splotches of light, but he wanted all copies of Walsmear's photographs destroyed so that Doyle's own "fairy" photographs would have less competition.

Given some money by Doyle, Castle traveled by train to Burkinwell, a fictitious town in England. On the train he met a woman named Linda Drain, and the two of them were robbed by a pair of thieves named Paolo and Shorty. In Burkinwell, Castle met the two girls from the photographs, Clara and Anna Templeton, as well their father, Brian Templeton, who is allegedly syphilitic. Linda Drain turned out to be the wife of Thomas Drain, the local minister, who allowed Castle to set up a darkroom in the cellar of the church. Castle then traveled into the woods, seeking out a Gypsy camp where he would find Walsmear and ask his assistance in procuring more photographs of the fairies in the Templeton garden. Castle located Walsmear, but the constable was hesitant to help because Walsmear was partially responsible for the death of Mrs. Templeton, the mother of Anna and Clara. Castle then got drunk at the Gypsy camp and was attacked violently by Paolo and Shorty, the same thieves from the train.

Castle woke up in a bed in the Templeton house. As he recovered from his injuries, the girls Anna and Clara showed him the fairies in their garden, though Castle could not see anything. Later, one night, Castle saw Thomas Drain enter the Templeton garden, alone and completely naked. Drain made orgiastic movements as if being fondled by someone, though no one was there. A few nights later, Castle saw Anna and Clara sneak out of their house, eat special flowers from the garden, and socialize with the fairies. Castle tried eating the same type of flower and saw a mysterious mist appear, followed by visions of fairies and tiny men (called "elves" in Castle's narration). The following day Castle tried to locate more of the special flowers – described as having "short, purplish red, spiky" petals, a "single yellow tuft that protruded above them," and "sharply serrated leaf edges" - but Mr. Templeton took the only remaining flower of its kind and refused to give Castle access to it. Years ago Walsmear had mistakenly run over Mrs. Templeton with his car (Walsmear also once had an affair with her), and Walsmear believed Mrs. Templeton had run blindly into the road because she had been chasing fairies, under the influence of the mysterious flower. Walsmear's only reason for proving to himself that the fairies were real, was to assuage his conscience – to convince himself that she died as a result of seeing fairies, as opposed to her committing suicide from guilt as a result of her having an affair with Walsmear.

Castle's interest in the fairies, by this time, was purely self-serving; he fancied he had made an amazing discovery in the garden and prepared to take some photographs of the garden at night, using special lighting techniques. On his way to the garden the next night, however, Castle once again ran into Paolo and Shorty, whom Walsmear hired to steal the photographs from the Templeton house. They were then joined by Thomas Drain, naked and about to have another orgy with the fairies. Paolo and Shorty mistakenly killed Drain and left Castle for dead. Castle was later found and arrested.

Thus Castle is blamed for the murder of Thomas Drain, for several reasons: Paolo and Shorty vanished from the garden and were never seen again; it was discovered that Castle was having an affair with Linda Drain; and Castle cannot give any reasonable explanation as to why he came to the Templeton garden that night. Just the night before he is executed, Castle is visited one more time by the fairies in his prison cell.

== "Cottingley Fairies" basis ==
When Charles Castle visits Arthur Conan Doyle with Walsmear's photographs, Doyle dismisses the photographs as completely devoid of any proof of fairies. Doyle then tells Castle that he has his own set of fairy photographs. Doyle shows him one of the photographs:

I picked up the first print. It was an outdoor scene. A lot like Walsmear's photos. There was a young girl, not nearly so pretty or angelic as the girls in Walsmear's photos. (Actually, I thought she looked a little cheap.) She was holding out her index finger. And standing on the index finger was – I couldn't believe my eyes.

This description presumably refers to the second photograph of the actual Cottingley Fairies, which shows Elsie Wright holding out her hand to what appears to be a winged gnome. Arthur Conan Doyle did in real life express strong interest in the Cottingley Fairies. The village of Cottingley, Bradford is never mentioned in the novel Photographing Fairies, nor are the girls Elsie and Frances ever named.

Lucie Armitt calls Burkinwell, the village of the Templeton garden, "Szilagyi's fictional version of Cottingley." However, Castle does not believe Doyle's pictures at all. Castle responds, "Yes, I see a fairy. But it's just painted on there. Someone's painted a fairy onto the print and rephotographed it...What I do know is that if there are fairies, they don't look like popular illustrations. They'll look how they look. Not how we want them to look."

Castle's journey to Burkinwell is motivated purely by Walsmear's splotchy photographs. Doyle's photographs of the Cottingley Fairies are never mentioned again in the rest of the novel, except at the end. While in prison, Castle hears that Doyle's photographs have found international fame and intrigue, in sharp contrast to the ridicule with which the public responded to Castle's explanations of the fairies when he was in court.

== Development ==
Steve Szilagyi has stated that he wrote the novel "holed up in my apartment," and that it "reflected my love of English writing of the period; not only Doyle, but P.G. Wodehouse, Agatha Christie, and E. M. Forster." He has further stated, "I never produced another novel after Photographing Fairies. I have a thousand excuses, and no excuse."

== Reception and criticism ==
Photographing Fairies received favorable reviews when published in 1992.

Chris Patsilelis of the Rocky Mountain News wrote that it "vibrates with the tension of a top-notch detective story. It is also a sobering lesson about how corruption can co-exist with the sublime. Mesmerizing and offbeat, Photographing Fairies is an irresistible treat." Marc Munroe Dion of The Kansas City Star called it "a spritely first novel full of gentle humor, weird sex and unlikely happenings. Szilagyi writes with a sort of careless half-smile that keeps the reader reading." Gail Pool wrote a review published in the U-T San Diego, in which she called the novel "an enjoyable mystery-fantasy" that manages to be both a murder mystery and a fairy tale. Roberta J. Wahlers of The Milwaukee Journal called it a whimsical story that "turns darker by degrees as little acts of viciousness multiply and the whimsy becomes almost terrifying. It's a delicately constructed maze at turns funny and frightening." Charles A. Brady of The Buffalo News called it "brilliant entertainment," and he noted the irony of Arthur Conan Doyle's appearance in this story: "Sir Arthur's particular Jekyll and Hyde were Holmes, the apotheosis of reason, and Watson, the ultra-respectable man in the street who could be taken in by just such a hoax as that of the fairy photographs."

Frederic Koeppel of The Commercial Appeal was less impressed. Koeppel called it amateurish, "a bad novel with a great theme," and lamented, "What readers do not encounter is the thematic spaciousness this story could allow or the breadth of prose it demands."

Lucie Armitt called Photographing Fairies "a novel about the relationship between the licit and the illicit in all its forms (sexual, criminal, liturgical, and medical), which uses the relationship between the supernatural and the natural to frame questions of desire as they accrue around the world of child's play and as they affect children and adults alike." She proposed that the novel's sexual aspects were Szilagyi's way of hinting that people must rely on their baser instincts to perceive a world of magic rather than reason: "Throughout this novel, one of its most Gothic aspects derives from the very adult sexuality surrounding the childhood sensuality that enables the communion with fairies to occur." The various extramarital liaisons in the novel, Brian Templeton's syphilis, Drain's naked sessions with the fairies, the loose woman named Esmirelda who works at the Starry Night inn – these exquisite sexual aspects are a part of the same world that contains, and in fact an extension of the same part of the human mind which believes in, fairies. A person cannot believe in fairies without a certain reckless curiosity, a willingness to disobey conventions in pursuit of sheer pleasures that do not fit in with society or any of its customs.

== Awards and adaptations ==
Photographing Fairies was short-listed for the 1993 World Fantasy Award.

Janice Harayda of The Plain Dealer noted in 1992, "Richard Gere has expressed interest in the movie rights. So have Paramount, Touchstone and Hanna-Barbera. The Italian rights have gone to the venerable firm of Mondadori, and Ballantine is negotiating with other publishers in Korea and Germany."

The novel was made into the 1997 movie Photographing Fairies starring Ben Kingsley and directed by Nick Willing.
