= Lady Eaton =

Lady Eaton may refer to:

- Flora Eaton
- Margaret Eaton, Baroness Eaton
