= A Cold Silence =

2015 novel by Alison Littlewood

- First edition cover
- Author: Alison Littlewood
- Language: English
- Genres: Fantasy, horror
- Publisher: Jo Fletcher Books
- Publication date: September 2015
- Publication place: United Kingdom
- Media type: Trade paperback
- Pages: 400
- ISBN: 978-1-84866-992-5
- Preceded by: A Cold Season

A Cold Silence is a fantasy and horror novel by English writer Alison Littlewood. It is the sequel to her debut novel, A Cold Season (2012), and was first published in the United Kingdom in September 2015 by Jo Fletcher Books. It is about a group of friends from the sinister village of Darnshaw who investigate the deaths of several people who had played a computer game called Archeron.

A Cold Silence was shortlisted for the 2016 British Fantasy Award for Best Horror Novel (August Derleth Award).

== Plot summary ==
After managing to flee the sinister village of Darnshaw with her son Ben in A Cold Season, Cass is alarmed twenty years later when Ben announces that he wants to return to the village. Jessica, a childhood friend of his has died and Ben wants to attend her funeral. Cass forbids him from going back because of the trauma she and a younger Ben endured there. But he goes anyway.

In Darnshaw, Ben meets up with some of his old friends, and learns that Jessica had committed suicide after playing a computer game called Archeron. They discover that the game draws on the occult and will grant you your wishes, provided you give it what it asks for. After they learn that the game had resulted in the deaths of several other young people, Ben and his friends visit the London offices of the game's developers to get answers as to what is happening.

== Critical reception ==
Reviewing A Cold Silence in Sci-Fi Bulletin, Marie O'Regan called the book "an involving sequel" to its predecessor. She said it shows the impact the events in A Cold Season had on Cass and her son, and described Ben as "a worthwhile protagonist". O'Regan liked the way the novel builds up to its "final reveal" and conclusion. She gave A Cold Silence a score of seven out of ten.

In a more critical review at Tor.com, Niall Alexander described A Cold Silence as "an exhausting" and "tedious sequel" to A Cold Season. He complained that some of the scenarios in the book drag on for pages and pages and rely on "careless characterisation and casual narrative contrivance". He called the book's antagonist "cartoonish", and said Ben has "all the personality of a pencil". Alexander stated that A Cold Silence's premise is "promising" but "little of it is convincing".

Stephen Theaker wrote in a review in Black Static that of Littlewood's first six books, A Cold Silence is a "definite misfire". (Of the six books, he named The Hidden People her "best novel yet".) Theaker felt that while the effect the computer game, Archeron has on people in A Cold Silence "is fascinating [and] an excellent idea rich with the potential", it all takes place in the novel's backstory. He said the bulk of the book is dominated by a couple of "very, very long conversations" and not much else. Theaker concluded that A Cold Silence is an "admirable" sequel to A Cold Season, but one that has not worked.
