= Photographing Fairies =

- Directed by: Nick Willing
- Written by: Nick Willing; Chris Harrald
- Based on: Photographing Fairies by Steve Szilagyi
- Produced by: Michele Carmarda
- Starring: Toby Stephens; Emily Woof; Ben Kingsley; Frances Barber; Philip Davis
- Cinematography: John de Borman
- Edited by: Sean Barton
- Music by: Simon Boswell
- Production companies: PolyGram Filmed Entertainment; BBC Films; The Arts Council of England
- Distributed by: Entertainment Film Distributors (United Kingdom); PolyGram Filmed Entertainment (International)
- Release date: 19 September 1997
- Running time: 104 minutes
- Country: United Kingdom
- Budget: $1 million
- Box office: $4.6 million

Photographing Fairies is a 1997 British fantasy film based on Steve Szilagyi's 1992 novel Photographing Fairies. The film explores some of the themes of folklore, such as possession, paganism, animism, hallucinogens, parapsychology and fairies. It was inspired by the Cottingley Fairies hoax, and was released in the United Kingdom on 19 September 1997.

== Plot ==
In Switzerland in 1912, photographer Charles Castle (Toby Stephens) and Anna-Marie (Rachel Shelley), his fiancée, are married in an Alpine church. The following day, they are walking in the mountains when a snowstorm closes in. They are returning to the village when a crevasse opens and Anna-Marie falls into it. Charles tries to pull her out but he loses his grip and she dies. During the Great War, Castle serves as an army photographer in the trenches of France. While he is photographing corpses with his assistant Roy (Phil Davis), a mortar shell lands close by. Roy returns to the trenches but Castle seems unconcerned and continues photographing. He returns to the trenches just before the shell explodes.

After the war, Castle and Roy run a photographic studio in London. Castle specialises in photographic trick work, including photomontage. He attends a lecture at the Theosophical Society, where Arthur Conan Doyle is examining a projected image of the Cottingley Fairies. Conan Doyle seems convinced they are genuine, but Castle stands, publicly debunks the image, and hands out business cards to the audience.

At his studio, Castle is visited by Beatrice Templeton (Frances Barber), who shows him a photograph of her daughter. She is convinced that a mysterious shape is a fairy, but Castle dismissed the idea. However, he investigates the photograph, sees the shape laterally reflected in the girl's eye, and makes multiple large prints to discover how the picture was made. Unable to explain or debunk the photograph, Castle hastily travels to see Beatrice in a village called Birkenwell, where upon arrival he sees and recognises Templeton's daughters, Ana (Miriam Grant) and Clara (Hannah Bould), and follows them to their home. Beatrice tells Castle that the photograph no longer matters – she has seen the fairies. She asks him to meet her at the great tree in Birkenwell Woods the following day.

At the appointed time, Castle walks to the great tree, where Beatrice is waiting. Before he arrives, she removes her hat and shoes then climbs the tree. When he arrives, Castle discovers Beatrice's removed clothing, then finds her lifeless body on the ground. After making a statement at the local police station, Castle encounters the Templeton girls, who are greeted by their father Nicholas, a Christian minister.

Nicholas reluctantly allows Castle to remain since the girls seem to like him and he is concerned about their behavior. Castle discovers that Beatrice had been documenting her daughters' odd behavior, and in her notes finds that she had been experimenting with a distinctive rare flower. Having already noticed Ana and Clara consuming the flower themselves, Castle takes some himself and discovered that it allows him to see the fairies that Beatrice and her daughters saw.

Castle calls in his business partner and assistant to set up a photo shoot using his most advanced equipment. After consuming the flower again and having them photograph the experience, Castle concludes that fairies do exist, and that the flower allows the brain to slow down enough so that they can be seen and interacted with, as they normally move so fast that only the most advanced of cameras can photograph them. Castle's obsession comes to a head when one day, a fed-up Nicholas starts burning his equipment; although Castle is too deep under the flower's influence to initially care, he flies into a rage when some of the fairies drift too close and catch fire. Castle assaults and kills Nicholas and is subsequently arrested.

Refusing to defend himself, Castle is found guilty and sentenced to hang, while Ana and Clara are put into foster care, though they seem to care little about the situation. Castle bids farewell to his associates and faces his death without fear. The final scene returns to the Alps, where Castle is trying to save Anna-Marie. This time he is successful in pulling her back up to the path, and they embrace and continue walking.

== Cast ==
- Toby Stephens as Charles Castle, a photographer
- Rachel Shelley as Anna-Marie Castle, fiancée/wife of Charles
- Edward Hardwicke as Sir Arthur Conan Doyle
- Ben Kingsley as Nicholas Templeton, a Christian minister
- Frances Barber as Beatrice Templeton, wife of Nicholas
- Miriam Grant as Ana Templeton, daughter of Nicholas and Beatrice
- Hannah Bould as Clara Templeton, daughter of Nicholas and Beatrice
- Emily Woof as Linda, nanny of the Templeton household

== Critical reception ==
Time Out London said of Photographing Fairies "Aided by a fine cast (notably Kingsley as the girls' vicar father) and, appropriately, stunning photography by John de Borman, it's a fresh, rewarding film, intelligent and very beautiful."

== See also ==
- Cottingley Fairies
- FairyTale: A True Story, another 1997 film also inspired by the Cottingley Fairies
- The Cottingley Secret, a 2017 novel by Hazel Gaynor
- The Cottingley Cuckoo, a 2021 novel by Alison Littlewood
