= The Cottingley Cuckoo =

2021 novel by A. J. Elwood

- First edition cover
- Author: A. J. Elwood
- Language: English
- Genres: Urban fantasy, horror
- Publisher: Titan Books
- Publication date: April 2021
- Publication place: United Kingdom
- Media type: Trade paperback
- Pages: 368
- ISBN: 978-1-78909-685-9

The Cottingley Cuckoo is an urban fantasy and horror novel by A. J. Elwood, pen name of English writer Alison Littlewood. It was first published in the United Kingdom in April 2021 by Titan Books. The book was inspired by the 1920 Cottingley fairy photographs, and is about Rose, a caregiver at the Sunnyside Care Home in the 2020s who is shown letters by a resident that were written in the 1920s soon after the fairy photographs were published. In the letters, the author claims to have also seen fairies, and maintains that he has proof of their existence.

The Cottingley Cuckoo evolved from Cottingley, a novella Littlewood wrote in 2017, and is a collection of the 1920s letters.

== Plot summary ==
In the 2020s, Rose starts working as a caregiver at the Sunnyside Care Home. She is tasked with looking after an elderly lady, Charlotte Favell, but soon discovers that Mrs. Favell is unlike any of the other residents at the home. She is formidable and mysterious, and Rose is intimidated by her. One day, Mrs. Favell shows Rose an old letter written in 1921 by Lawrence Fenton to Arthur Conan Doyle. At the time, Conan Doyle had recently published photographs that cousins Frances Griffiths and Elsie Wright had allegedly taken of fairies in Cottingley. In the letter Fenton says that he, his daughter-in-law, Charlotte, and his seven-year-old granddaughter, Harriet have also seen and photographed fairies. He further states that they found a dead fairy and took it home as proof of their existence. Even though, many years later, Griffiths and Wright's photographs were revealed to be fakes, Rose is captivated by the letter and its implications.

Over a period of weeks, Mrs. Favell teases Rose with more letters. Having not received a response from Conan Doyle, Fenton wrote a series of letters to Edward Gardner, an associate of Conan Doyle. In these letters, Fenton reveals the true nature of fairies, that they are not pretty little winged people, but are the dangerous and vindictive creatures from folklore. He tells Gardner that he believes Charlotte is being held captive by fairies, and that the woman in his house is not his daughter-in-law, but a changeling. In another letter, Fenton tells Gardner that Harriet has gone to the fairies.

Mrs. Favell becomes more enigmatic and Rose is convinced she can read Rose's mind. One day she tells Rose that Rose is pregnant even before she knows it herself, and that the baby's name should be Robyn. Later Mrs. Favell's daughter, Harriet, comes to visit, and Rose sees that she is also pregnant. Harriet sympathetically puts her hand on Rose's swollen belly, but Rose is shocked by her gesture. Rose begins to wonder if Charlotte Favell and her daughter, Harriet are the same Charlotte and Harriet in Fenton's letters. She also wonders if they are mischievous fairies.

When Rose gives birth, she is surprised it is a boy and not "Robyn", as Mrs. Favell predicted. Rose's boyfriend Paul suggests they call him Alexander, but she does not bond with the baby, who screams constantly and fights her. When Rose takes Alexander to visit the care home, Harriet is also there, and she discovers that Harriet's baby is a girl named Robyn. Robyn is beautiful and content and Rose is convinced she is her baby that Harriet took from her, and that Alexander is a changeling.

Rose confronts Harriet about Robyn and Harriet asks Charlotte, "Mother, what have you done?" Harriet then proceeds to explain to Rose that her mother has been playing games with her. Years ago, Charlotte's father-in-law murdered her young daughter, believing she was not a normal child. Charlotte adopted Harriet in an attempt to replace her lost daughter, but was convinced Harriet was a changeling. Her mother was later found to have Capgras Syndrome, and Rose wonders whether Charlotte wrote those letters herself in an attempt to explain what had happened to her. But Rose dismisses the thought, and is sure that Harriet's story about her mother is all lies to further confuse her. She is certain now that Charlotte and Harriet are fairies, and is determined to take back Robyn, her real daughter.

== Background ==
Cottingley
- First edition cover of the novella, Cottingley
- Author: Alison Littlewood
- Cover artist: Vincent Sammy
- Language: English
- Genres: Urban fantasy, horror
- Publisher: NewCon Press
- Publication date: July 2017
- Publication place: United Kingdom
- Media type: Trade paperback
- Pages: 80
- ISBN: 978-1-910935-49-1

The Cottingley Cuckoo grew out of Cottingley, a novella Littlewood wrote in 2017. The novella is a collection of letters written by Lawrence Fenton in the early 1920s to Arthur Conan Doyle and Edward Gardner. They were written in the wake of the 1920 Cottingley fairy photographs, and in them, Fenton states that he and his daughter-in-law and granddaughter had also seen and photographed fairies. He also maintains that he had found a tiny fairy skeleton.

Littlewood said that after the novella was published, she began to wonder how a troubled person today, vulnerable and open to suggestion, would react to those letters from the past. This led to her revising the letters and including them in a longer contemporary story featuring Rose. Littlewood added that The Cottingley Cuckoo "is [all] about belief – why people choose to believe the things they do, and if, once they've begun, they can turn back." She said the novel also questions the reader's beliefs and how they react to those letters.

== Critical reception ==
Reviewing The Cottingley Cuckoo in SFBook Reviews, Sam Tyler described it as a mix of urban fantasy and psychological horror. He said the story becomes "uncomfortable and horrific" as it draws on fairy folklore and its "child snatching and changelings". Tyler called Charlotte "a manipulative and cruel person" who takes advantage of Rose's vulnerability. He stated that The Cottingley Cuckoo is "an intense character led story" with Rose "front and centre". In a review in the Telegraph & Argus, Emma Clayton said The Cottingley Cuckoo has an "eerie reimagining" of the Cottingley fairy photographs. She described the book as "a gothic take on 'the darker side of motherhood'" and the effect the fairies in those photographs had on people for many years.

Ally Wilkes opined that Elwood's prose is "confident, crystal-clear, and deeply evocative". Writing in Horrified Magazine on The British Horror Website, she said that the book's characters are "intensely memorable". The central character, Rose, is "sympathetic[ly] and carefully drawn", while Mrs Favell is depicted as "a mysterious ... intruding time traveller" and "breathtakingly cruel". Wilkes stated that Rose's escalating nightmare towards the end of the book is "the sort of dénouement which is tricky to pull off", but here Elwood has executed it "successfully". Wilkes found The Cottingley Cuckoo "deeply chilling" and recommended it to readers interested in "literary supernatural horror".

In a more critical review for The British Fantasy Society, Sarah Deeming wrote that while she appreciated The Cottingley Cuckoo, in particular the way it addresses "a difficult part of motherhood that isn't often talked about", she said the book "just doesn't bowl me over". Deeming stated that Rose is underdeveloped, making the character difficult to empathise with, and said she did not enjoy Elwood's literary style, in particular the book's ambiguous ending, which she felt "just didn't work for me".

== See also ==
- Photographing Fairies
- FairyTale: A True Story
- The Cottingley Secret

== Works cited ==
- Littlewood, Alison (2021). The Cottingley Cuckoo. Titan Books. ISBN 978-1-78909-685-9.
