= Margaret Eaton, Baroness Eaton =

British Conservative politician

The Right Honourable The Baroness Eaton DBE DL
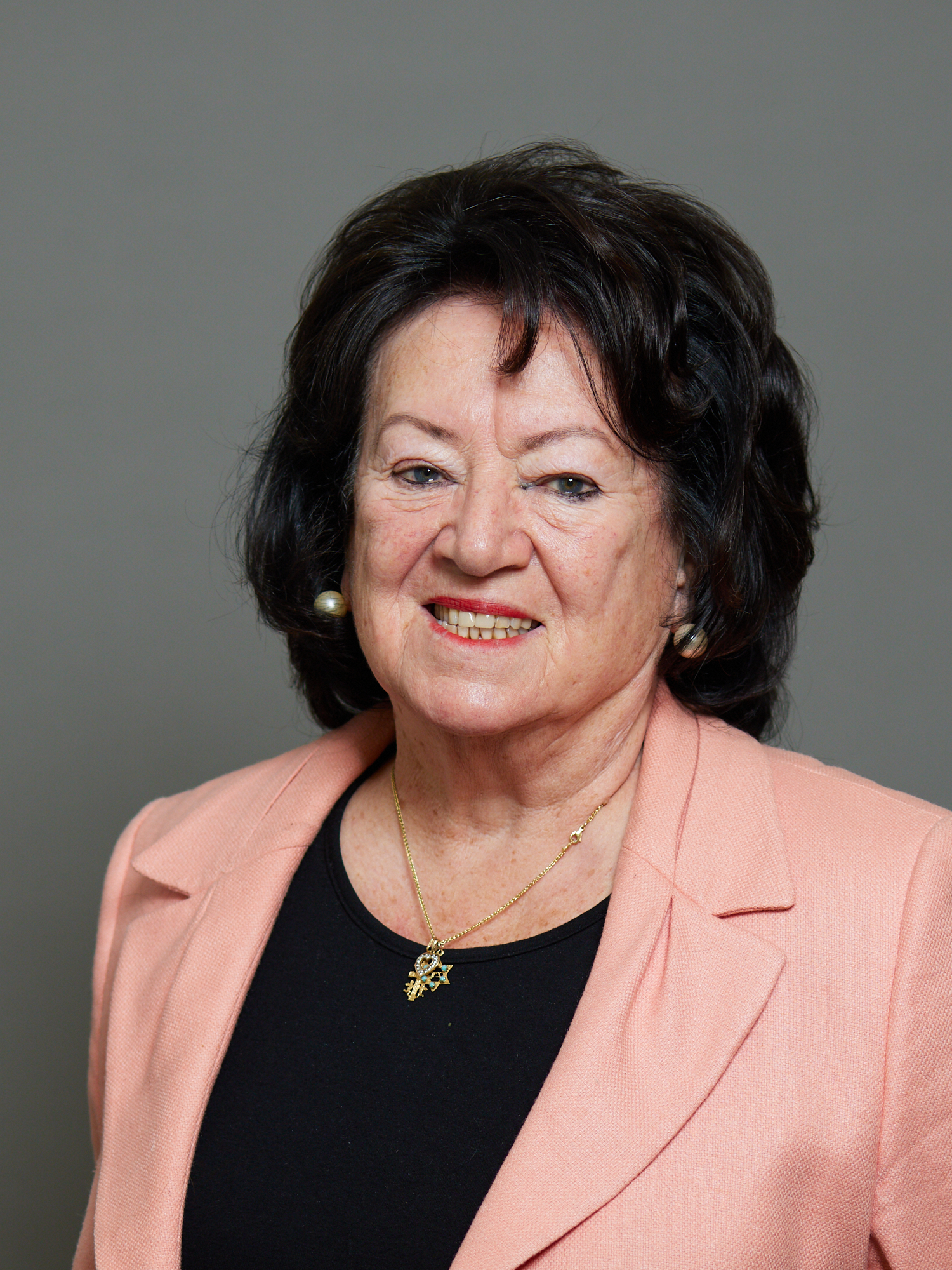

Member of the House of Lords
- Lord Temporal
- Life peerage 21 July 2010

Personal details
- Born: 1 June 1942 (age 84)

Ellen Margaret Eaton, Baroness Eaton, DBE, DL (born 1 June 1942, Bradford, England) has been a Conservative Party life peer in the British House of Lords since 2010.

She was a Councillor with Bradford Metropolitan Borough Council from 1986 and was the Chairman of the Local Government Association until June 2011.

== Biography ==
Born as Ellen Margaret Midgley in 1942 to John and Evelyn (née Smith) Midgley, she attended Hanson Grammar School and the Balls Park Teacher Training College, where she achieved a Certificate in Education. She worked as a schoolteacher. In 1969, she married John Eaton, with whom she has a son and a daughter.

== Political career ==
- Member, Bradford Metropolitan Borough Council, since 1986
- Leader of Conservative Group 1995–
- Council Leader 2000–06
- Director: Bradford Centre Regeneration Company, Leeds Bradford International Airport
- Member, Yorkshire and Humber Assembly
- Local Government Association: Vice-chairman, Conservative Group, chairman, Conservative Group, 2008–11
- Member, Committee of the Regions, 2003–06
- Deputy Lieutenant for West Yorkshire since 2008
- Chairman, Local Government Association, 2008–11

== Affiliations ==
- Chairman and Trustee, Near Neighbours (national registered charity)
- Trustee, Angelus Foundation (national registered charity for drugs education)
- Trustee, Cottingley Town Hall, Cottingley, Bradford, West Yorkshire
- Member, Common Sense Group as anti-"woke" group within the Conservative Party
- Member of Advisory Group, Marston Holdings (bailiffs)

== Honours ==
- Officer of the Order of the British Empire (OBE) in the 2003 Birthday Honours.
- Dame Commander of the Order of the British Empire (DBE) in the 2010 New Year Honours
- Baroness Eaton, of Cottingley, in the County of West Yorkshire on 21 July 2010
- Honorary Doctor of Laws of the University of Bradford - December 2012

Coat of arms of Margaret Eaton, Baroness Eaton
Escutcheon Argent three escallops in pale a sinister canton in chief and a dexter canton in base Vert. Supporters On either side a hierocosphinx with a bull's tail Argent armed beaked and the tail tufted Or winged Vert the wing charged with two roses Argent barbed and seeded Or murally gorged and holding in the interior foreclaws a length of vine stalk leaved Vert. Motto Deo Dante Dedi

Political offices
Preceded by Sir Simon Milton	Chair of the Local Government Association; 2008–2011	Succeeded by Sir Merrick Cockell
