= Murder of Bridget Cleary =

Irish woman killed by her husband (1869–1895)

Bridget Cleary
- Born: Bridget Boland; 19 February 1869; Ballyvadlea, County Tipperary, Ireland
- Died: 15 March 1895 (aged 26); Ballyvadlea, County Tipperary, Ireland
- Occupation: Dressmaker
- Spouse: Michael Cleary (m. 1887–1895, her death)

Bridget Cleary (née Boland; Irish: Bríd Uí Chléirigh; 19 February 1869 – 15 March 1895) was an Irish woman who was murdered by her husband in 1895. She was either immolated or her body was set on fire immediately after her death. The husband's stated motive was his belief that she had been abducted by fairies and replaced with a changeling, which he then killed. The gruesome nature of the case prompted extensive press coverage, and the trial was closely followed by newspapers across Ireland.

== Early life and marriage ==
Bridget Cleary (née Boland) was born on 19 February 1869 in Ballyvadlea, County Tipperary, Ireland. She married Michael Cleary on 6 August 1887 in the Roman Catholic church in Drangan. The couple had met earlier that month in Clonmel, where he worked as a cooper and she served as a dressmaker's apprentice. The couple never had children.

After the wedding, Bridget returned to her townland of Ballyvadlea to live with her parents, while Michael continued to work as a cooper in Clonmel. During this period of living apart, Bridget's independence grew, with her keeping her own flock of chickens and selling the eggs to neighbours. Somewhat unusually for the era and location, she was also a professional woman. She obtained a Singer sewing machine, state of the art at the time, and was variously described as a dressmaker and a milliner. Following the death of Bridget's mother, the Clearys found themselves responsible for her elderly father, Patrick Boland. His residence with the couple enabled them to secure a house reserved for labourers. Neither Bridget nor Michael was entitled to this cottage, but as Patrick had been a labourer in his youth, they were able to acquire the best house in the village. However, there was no widespread interest in the house, as it was built on the site of a supposed fairy ringfort.

== Disappearance ==
Bridget was reported missing in March 1895. She had evidently been ill for several days; her diagnosis was said to be bronchitis. More than a week into her illness, on 13 March 1895, a physician visited her at her home; her condition was considered sufficiently grave that a priest soon followed, to administer last rites. Several of Bridget's friends and family members attended her over the next two days, and a number of home remedies were administered, including one ritual that anticipated her later demise: her father and her husband accused her of being a fairy sent to take Bridget's place. Urine was thrown on her, and she was carried before the fireplace to cast the fairy out.

By 16 March, rumours were beginning to circulate that Bridget was missing, and local police began searching for her. Michael was quoted as claiming that his wife had been taken by fairies, and he appeared to be holding a vigil. Witness statements were gathered over the ensuing week, and by the time Bridget's burnt corpse was found in a shallow grave on 22 March, nine people had been charged in her disappearance, including her husband. A coroner's inquest the next day returned a verdict of death by burning.

== Trial ==
Legal hearings ran from 1 to 6 April 1895. A tenth person had been charged, and one of the original nine was discharged at this stage, leaving nine defendants bound over for trial. The court session began on 3 July, and the grand jury indicted five of the defendants for murder: Michael Cleary, Patrick Boland, Mary Kennedy, James Kennedy, and Patrick Kennedy. All nine were indicted on charges of "wounding". The case proceeded on to trial.

The evidence showed that on 15 March, Michael summoned a Father Ryan back to the Cleary household. Ryan found Bridget alive but agitated. Michael told the priest that he had not been giving his wife the medicine prescribed by the doctor because he had no faith in it. According to Ryan, "Cleary then said, 'People may have some remedy of their own that might do more good than doctor's medicine,' or something to that effect." Bridget was given communion, and Ryan departed. Later that night, neighbours and relatives returned to the Cleary house. An argument ensued, again tinged with fairy mythology.

At some point, Bridget told Michael that the only person who'd gone off with the fairies had been his mother. Michael attempted to force-feed his wife, throwing her down on the ground before the kitchen fireplace and menacing her with a burning piece of wood. Bridget's chemise caught fire, and Michael then threw lamp oil (kerosene) on Bridget. The witnesses were unclear as to whether she was already dead by this point. Michael kept the others back from her body as it burned, insisting that she was a changeling and had been for a week previously, and that he would get his wife back from the fairies.

As part of the trial, the jury was physically led out to the storage building where Bridget's body was being held for burial, and where it was available for viewing. The jury were given the opportunity to see the condition of the body and the extent of her injuries, as well as to personally verify that the body was indeed Bridget's by looking upon her face. What the jury witnessed in the outbuilding convinced them of the horrible suffering Bridget had endured prior to death.

Charges against one co-defendant, William Ahearn, were dropped, and Mary Kennedy was released owing to her age and frailty. Patrick Kennedy was sentenced to five years of penal servitude and John Dunne was sentenced to three years of penal servitude. The others were sentenced to hard labour, with James Kennedy and William Kennedy serving eighteen months, and Michael Kennedy and John Dunne serving six months.

Michael Cleary was found guilty of manslaughter and sentenced to twenty years of penal servitude; he spent fifteen years in prison. He was released from Maryborough Gaol on 28 April 1910 and moved to the English city of Liverpool, from which he emigrated to Canada in July of the same year. On 14 October 1910, a black bordered letter was sent from the office of the Secretary of State, Home Department, London, to the undersecretary, Dublin Castle, stating that Michael had emigrated to Montreal on 30 June.

== Public reaction and aftermath ==
Bridget's death and the publicity surrounding the trial were regarded as being politically significant at the time. Irish home rule was an active political issue in England; William Ewart Gladstone's Liberal Party came to power on a Home Rule platform, but two years prior had lost its latest Irish Government Bill in the House of Lords. Press coverage of the Cleary case occurred in an atmosphere of debate over the Irish people's ability to govern themselves, and worries were expressed about the credulity and superstition of rural Catholics. The coroner who examined Bridget's corpse claimed that "amongst Hottentots one would not expect to hear of such an occurrence."

The writer E. F. Benson took a considerable interest in the case, publishing a scholarly commentary on it, "The Recent 'Witch-Burning at Clonmel'", in the influential periodical The Nineteenth Century in June 1895, before the trial itself began. It accepts the defence argument that those involved with Bridget's death acted out of a genuine belief that she had been possessed by a spirit, had no intention of murder, and were attempting to restore her to her rightful self. Benson cites a pattern of similar beliefs in "savage tribes", with examples from various societies, and talks of "the enormous force which such beliefs exercise on untutored minds". He points out that the door of the Cleary house was left open and no attempts were made to keep the assaults on Bridget secret. "It is inconceivable that, if they had wished to kill her, they would have left the door open, that they should have allowed their shouts to attract the neighbours, or that ten persons should have been admitted to witness the deed. Terrible and ghastly as the case is, we cannot call it wilful murder." The article ends with the statement: "... if ... they killed, but not with intent to kill, still less should the extreme penalty be inflicted".

In retrospect, Bridget's death has been popularly described as "the last witch burned in Ireland" or as the subject of the last of the witchcraft trials, although it has been noted that Bridget was never actually described as having consorted with the Devil, which is customary with accused witches; instead, she was thought to have been replaced by a fairy changeling.

== Psychiatric aspects of the case ==
H. O'Connell and P. G. Doyle (2006) speculated that the murder may have been the result of Michael developing a brief psychotic disorder, which manifested as Capgras delusion, owing to the stress of managing Bridget's illness. This became a case of folie à plusieurs after he persuaded others that she had been replaced by a fairy. The possibility that others complicit in the murder had learning disabilities that allowed them to become convinced of the delusion's veracity was also raised.

== In popular culture ==
An Irish nursery rhyme reads, "Are you a witch, or are you a fairy/Or are you the wife of Michael Cleary?"

The Last Burning, by Cork playwright Patrick Galvin (first performed in 1974 in the Lyric Theatre Belfast; last performed by ThereisBear Theatre in 2012 Dublin's Smock Alley Theatre), is about the relationship between Michael and Bridget, and the unwavering conviction Michael has that his wife is a witch. The play contains fictional, ethereal characters, including those who goad Michael's beliefs.

The Burning of Bridget Cleary by Angela Bourke and The Cooper's Wife is Missing by Joan Hoff & Marian Yeates, both released independently of each other in 2000, are historical accounts of the case that attempt to contextualize the murder with the belief in fairies in Ireland during the period.

The podcast Lore devoted one of its episodes ("Black Stockings", broadcast 25 July 2015) to the story of Bridget Cleary's murder. The story was one of six podcast episodes chosen to be adapted to a TV series. Bridget Cleary was portrayed by Holland Roden, while her husband Michael was portrayed by Cathal Pendred.

The Hidden People (2016) is a historical fantasy and horror novel by English writer Alison Littlewood that is based on the story of Cleary.

The events surrounding Bridget Cleary's death are the subject of the song "Changeling" by Irish rock band The Riptide Movement on their 2016 album Ghosts.

Irish playwright Margaret Perry wrote the play Porcelain (first performed at the Abbey Theatre, 18 February 2018) about Bridget Cleary and is heavily influenced by Bourke's book, as well as the theory that Michael Cleary and the other perpetrators had Capgras delusion and Fregoli delusion.

The 2019 book Dead Blondes and Bad Mothers discusses how Bridget Cleary was killed by her husband.

In 2019, Irish singer-songwriter Maija Sofia released a song, "The Wife of Michael Cleary", as part of an album about wronged women. A cover version, sung by Radie Peat, was recorded by ØXN on their debut album, CYRM.

Morbid: A True Crime Podcast released an episode "The Murder of Bridget Cleary" on 4 September 2023.

== See also ==
- Capgras delusion
- Michael Leahy – a boy who was drowned in County Kerry in 1826 because members of his community believed that he was a changeling.
