= Hazel Gaynor =

English author

- Born: 16 May 1971 (age 55); Driffield, East Riding of Yorkshire, England
- Education: Manchester Metropolitan University
- Occupation: Writer
- Children: 2
- Writing career
- Genres: Historical fiction, fantasy, romance
- Notable awards: Romantic Novelists' Association Award; STAR Award
- Website: www.hazelgaynor.com

Hazel Gaynor (born 16 May 1971) is an English author of historical fiction and fantasy based in Ireland.

== Early and personal life ==
Gaynor is from Driffield, East Riding of Yorkshire. She graduated in 1993 with a Bachelor of Arts in Business Studies from Manchester Metropolitan University. She and her sister lost their mother in 1995. Gaynor lived in Manchester, Australia, and London in the 1990s. She moved to Ireland in 2001 after meeting her now husband through a mutual friend in Dublin. They settled in Kilcullen, County Kildare in 2004 where they have raised their two sons.

== Career ==
Gaynor began her career in professional services. After she was laid off from her job as a learning and development executive at the Irish law firm A&L Goodbody during the Great Recession, she pursued her passion of writing. She ran a personal blog titled Hot Cross Mum, which became an e-book in 2011. She contributed to and interviewed authors such as Philippa Gregory for the likes of Writing.ie.

Gaynor self-published her debut fiction novel The Girl Who Came Home, based on the true story of 14 Irish emigrants on the Titanic, on Kindle in 2012. She received the Cecil Day Lewis Literary Bursary Award at Kildare Readers' Festival that year. In 2013, she landed her first publishing deal with HarperCollins under the William Morrow imprint, who re-published the novel in print in 2014. It became a New York Times and USA Today bestseller and was named the Romantic Novelists' Association Historical Novel of the Year. She signed with a New York agent.

Her second novel A Memory of Violets, originally titled Daughters of the Flowers, was published in February 2015. The character of Albert Shaw is based on John Groom. It appeared in WHSmith's spring selection.

This was followed by The Girl from the Savoy on London's interwar period in June 2016, a Globe and Mail and Irish Times best seller shortlisted for the Irish Book Awards.

In August 2017, Gaynor published her first fantasy novel The Cottingley Secret, a fictionalisation of the Cottingley fairies story from 1917 Yorkshire. Gaynor's October 2018 novel The Lighthouse Keeper's Daughter was a USA Today and Irish Times bestseller. Shortlisted for a Historical Writers' Association Gold Crown Award, the story of Grace Darling had fascinated Gaynor from a young age.

Her 2020 book, set at a boarding school in 1941 China, was published under the name The Bird in the Bamboo Cage in August in some countries and When We Were Young & Brave elsewhere in October.

=== Collaborations ===
In 2016, Gaynor wrote a short story for the collection Fall of Poppies.

Gaynor has collaborated with American author Heather Webb on Last Christmas in Paris (2017), Meet Me in Monaco (2019) featuring Grace Kelly, and Three Words for Goodbye (2021) (co-written over the COVID-19 lockdown). The first won the 2018 Women's Fiction Writers Association STAR Award in the General Category. The latter was one of BuzzFeed's July picks. They also co-wrote Christmas with the Queen, published in 2024.

Gaynor runs the Inspiration Project, which conducts workshops for aspiring writers, with Catherine Ryan Howard and Carmel Harrington.

== Bibliography ==
=== Fiction ===
- The Girl Who Came Home: A Novel of the Titanic (2012)
- A Memory of Violets: A Novel of London's Flower Sellers (2015)
- The Girl from the Savoy (2016)
- The Cottingley Secret (2017)
- Last Christmas in Paris: A Novel of World War I (2017), co-written with Heather Webb
- The Lighthouse Keeper's Daughter (2018)
- Meet Me in Monaco (2019), co-written with Heather Webb
- The Bird in the Bamboo Cave / When We Were Young & Brave (2020)
- Three Words for Goodbye (2021), co-written with Heather Webb
- The Last Lifeboat (2023)
- Christmas with the Queen (2024), co-written with Heather Webb
- Before Dorothy (2025)

=== Short stories ===
- "Hush" in Fall of Poppies: Stories of Love and the Great War (2016)

=== Nonfiction ===
- Hot Cross Mum: Bitesize Slices of Motherhood (2011)
