= Maija Sofia =

Irish singer-songwriter from County Galway

- Born: Maija Sofia Makela; Ireland
- Origin: County Galway
- Genres: folk; Psychedelic folk
- Occupation: Singer-songwriter
- Years active: 2015–present
- Labels: Trapped Animal Records, Cargo Records
- Website: maijasofia.bandcamp.com

Maija Sofia Makela is an Irish folk singer-songwriter from County Galway. She is known for combining contemporary folk music with themes drawn from mythology, folklore, feminism and overlooked historical narratives. Her debut album, ''Bath Time'' (2019), was nominated for the Choice Music Prize, while her second album, ''True Love'' (2023), received critical acclaim for its broader musical palette and exploration of mysticism, identity and memory.

== Early life ==
Maija Sofia Makela was born in County Galway and went to school in Headford. After finishing school Sofia moved to Dublin for a time before moving to England. She lived in London for two years before returning to Dublin to study English Literature in Trinity College Dublin.

Maija Sofia Makela has described growing up near Lough Corrib as an important influence on her songwriting. She has cited her mixed Irish, Finnish and Turkish Cypriot heritage, together with her studies in English literature, as shaping her interest in folklore, mythology and historical narratives.

== Career ==
After releasing the EPs ''sentient light'' (2014) and ''The Sugar Sea'' (2015), Maija Sofia Makela established herself on the Irish independent folk scene through live performances and self-released recordings. Her early work blended traditional folk influences with literary songwriting and atmospheric arrangements.

Her debut album Bath Time was described as "a collection of songs exploring the female experience throughout art, history and folklore"; it was nominated for the Choice Music Prize. Bath Time featured songs relating to marginalised women such as Elizabeth Siddal and Bridget Cleary.

== Discography ==
EPs

- sentient light (2014)
- The Sugar Sea (2015)

Studio albums

- Bath Time (2019)
- True Love (2023)
