= Steve Szilagyi =

American novelist

Steve Szilagyi is a critic, journalist, novelist and the author of Photographing Fairies (Ballantine, 1992), and co-author, with Bill Mesce Jr., of The Advocate (Bantam, 2000).

Ohio-born Szilagyi (pronounced Sil-AH-jee) graduated with honors from Columbia University, winning the Columbia Bennett Cerf Award for Fiction for his unpublished story collection The Night Sophia Loren's Dress Caught Fire in a Restaurant.

A painter and illustrator, Szilagyi has published drawings in New York Magazine and other national publications.

Photographing Fairies, his first novel, was short-listed for the 1993 World Fantasy Award. It was later adapted into the 1997 movie Photographing Fairies starring Ben Kingsley, and directed by Nick Willing.

Szilagyi is a Pushcart Prize Outstanding Writer, the winner of a Cleveland Emmy Award (1996), and the First Place winner for Best Arts Writing, Ohio Society of Professional Journalists awards (2000).
