= The Lighthouse Keeper's Daughter (novel) =

2018 novel by Hazel Gaynor

- Author: Hazel Gaynor
- Audio read by: Imogen Church
- Language: English
- Genre: Fiction; historical fiction
- Set in: Northumberland, UK and Newport, Rhode Island, US
- Published: 2018
- Publisher: HarperCollins, William Morrow and Company
- Pages: 396
- ISBN: 9780008255220

The Lighthouse Keeper's Daughter is a novel by Hazel Gaynor. It is set in two main locations: Longstone Lighthouse on the Northumberland Coast in England in the late 1830s and early 1840s, for which Gaynor uses historical fiction to describe the experiences of Grace Darling; and Newport, Rhode Island, particularly the Rose Island Light, in which the main protagonist is a fictional character in the late 1930s, Matilda Emmerson.

== Historical background ==
In the early hours of 7 September 1838 the SS Forfarshire ran aground in a heavy storm about 500 metres from the Longstone Lighthouse on which Grace Darling worked with her father. At dawn, she was the first person to see a small group of survivors on the rocks and insisted on accompanying her father in an open rowing boat, of the type known as a coble, to try to rescue them. They were successful in doing this, with Grace keeping the boat steady while her father guided a first group of survivors to the boat. Some were well enough to assist with the rowing and Grace stayed with the second group of survivors until her father could return. The heroism of the Darlings attracted widespread attention in the newspapers, and this particularly centred on Grace, who was 22 at the time. She received numerous letters, money (including £50 from Queen Victoria), and awards.

== The novel ==
The novel blends the above historical facts and Darling's subsequent death from tuberculosis in April 1842 with a fictional account of her love for George Emmerson, who is portrayed as the brother of Sarah Dawson, one of the actual passengers rescued but whose two young children died. The fictional Matilda Emmerson, who is sent, a century later, from Ireland to Newport, Rhode Island during her unmarried pregnancy to stay with Harriet, a reclusive relative and assistant lighthouse keeper at the Rose Island Light, is a distant relative of George. Further family relations emerge during the novel, which also draws on the historical event of the 1938 New England hurricane.

The author has said that the novel was inspired by the remarkable history of many female lighthouse keepers and not just Grace Darling. In particular, she drew inspiration from Ida Lewis who was the lighthouse keeper at Lime Rock Lighthouse in the Newport harbour in Rhode Island, which was later named after her. She was credited with saving many lives.

== Reviews ==
One reviewer considered that Gaynor did an excellent job of balancing lighthouse service history with the story of the participants. Noting that despite hints of romance on the part of both Grace and Matilda, this wasn't the focus of the novel, which emphasized the women and their lives formed by their choices. The Historical Novel Society noted that Gaynor's narrative seamlessly flowed between the eras and the women. It complimented the author for the accuracy of the historical details of northern England and Rhode Island. The weather itself was a narrative catalyst. Another reviewer also commented on the amount of research involved, adding that the storylines were complex and well woven.
