= The Cottingley Secret =

2017 novel by Hazel Gaynor

- First edition
- Author: Hazel Gaynor
- Language: English
- Genre: historical fiction, fantasy, magical realism
- Published: 2017
- Publisher: William Morrow and Company
- Publication place: United States
- ISBN: 978-0-06-269048-7

The Cottingley Secret is a 2017 fantasy novel written by British novelist Hazel Gaynor, in which she retells the story behind the Cottingley fairies from 1917. This novel intermingles the real events that occurred in 1917 with a fictional story set in 2017. The Cottingley Fairies were made famous through a series of photographs taken from 1917 to 1921 by two young girls of nine and sixteen years old—Frances Griffiths and Elsie Wright—in Cottingley, England. The story became renowned worldwide mainly because of the intervention of Sir Arthur Conan Doyle who took particular interest on the fairy photographs and tale. The photographs, which depict the two girls in the company of fairies, were originally published in Doyle's article written in 1920 for Strand Magazine, but can be found in other articles as well since the matter of their copyright has been largely disputed.

== Plot ==
The Cottingley Secret takes place in England, during World War I, in 1917. One of the main characters, Frances Griffiths, moves out of Cape Town, South Africa, with her mother because her father has to fight in the war. The book starts with Frances and her mother on a train taking them to their new lives in Cottingley, England, where her cousin, Elsie Wright, lives. The Cottingley Secret is a retelling of the story behind the Cottingley fairies and a series of purportedly real photographs created in Cottingley, a village in West Yorkshire, England. The plots follows the lives of the two cousins—Frances Griffiths and Elsie Wright—who photographed real fairies in the garden near a stream. The story follows the facts behind the real events—how the news attracted the attention of Sir Arthur Conan Doyle, how nationally renowned the girls became, and the hope of people who believed in the fantasy during war times.

Gaynor’s fictional reimagining continues into the present (2017) with Olivia Kavanagh, who after discovering her grandfather’s manuscript and the picture of the fairies, realizes that her story becomes intertwined with the cousins’ lives, causing past and present to blur together. Gaynor approaches the story intertwining past and present—in the form of a memoir written by Frances Griffiths that retells the past events, and through the present life of a fictional character (Olivia Kavanagh) whose family dates back to that time and place as well. The Cottingley Secret follows the life of Olivia. After her grandfather passes away, Olivia inherits his bookshop in Ireland called Something Old, so she decides to leave behind her life in London temporarily, which is tied to a fiancée and a steady job as a bookbinder. After finding a manuscript with Frances’s story and photographs of fairies, Olivia begins to struggle with choosing between a settled life in London or a new adventure where she feels a connection and meaning behind her newfound work. As Olivia gets deeper into the story, she also makes the connection that someone from Frances’s past is related to her family—a great grandmother. Having lost her own mother as a child and trying to take care of her grandmother, who suffers with Alzheimer’s, Olivia believes that holding on to this story is the only way to reconnect with her family.

Once Olivia finds out that the bookshop is under a threat of being shut down— due to debts, she embarks on a mission to get all the necessary funds and restore the bookshop. After a lost little girl, Iris, wanders into the bookshop, Olivia meets Ross, a local writer who becomes the bookshop's writer-in-residence. Together, they manage to bring the bookshop back to life by organizing events for the public and promoting the antique books on a website to reach more customers. Olivia steadily begins to balance out the debts and becomes so enthralled by Frances' manuscript that she decides to visit Cottingley, the place where her grandmother also grew up. Before she travels, Jack—Olivia's fiancée—shows up at the bookshop's door because Olivia won't return his calls and is ignoring her wedding planning. Olivia had found out before her grandfather's death that she was infertile, something she'd kept from Jack. When Jack finds out, he flies to Ireland to find her and bring her back to London, despite how angry he was at the results. However, Olivia decides to stay in Ireland, break off her engagement, and continue her research into her family history and their connection to the Cottingley fairies.

When Olivia finally travels to Cottingley, she discovers that the girl in her dreams that Frances also talked about in her memoir was her grandmother's sister, who died when she was a kid from a fall in the garden. Olivia's grandmother had been contacted when the body was found a decade later after Olivia's great grandmother died, and Olivia was able to visit the grave and put an end to her recurring dreams, finally satisfied with finding the connection between Frances' history and her own.

== Critical reception ==
Since its publication in August 2017, the novel has gathered largely positive reviews. The Irish Times calls the novel “an enchanting, charming story” while Kirkus Reviews admires the retelling more than the fictional story set in the present because Gaynor "creates a lovely meditation on the power of belief and hope." According to Kirkus Reviews, "The insight into the true story of the Cottingley fairies is interesting, and it's easy to understand why two girls might play along with an innocent trick that became a worldwide sensation." However, regarding the present events unfolding throughout the story, they write, "Olivia's struggles are never quite as compelling, and readers may find themselves eager to slip back into the world of the fairies." The New York Journal of Books called it a "delightful read".

== Photographs ==
Despite the original photographs published in 1917 and 1920 having been debunked as a hoax in 1983, The Cottingley Secret also includes the images on the last pages of the novel. The two girls later confessed in 1983 that even though the photographs were not tampered with, the fairies were in fact paper cutouts of fairies drawn by them.
