= Mistletoe (novel) =

2019 novel by Alison Littlewood

- First edition cover
- Author: Alison Littlewood
- Language: English
- Genres: Fantasy, horror
- Publisher: Jo Fletcher Books
- Publication date: October 2019
- Publication place: United Kingdom
- Media type: Hardcover
- Pages: 293
- ISBN: 978-1-78747-587-8

Mistletoe is a fantasy and horror novel by English writer Alison Littlewood. It was first published in the United Kingdom in October 2019 by Jo Fletcher Books, and is about a widow who buys a farmhouse in Yorkshire to start a new life, but is haunted by ghosts of the farm's former occupants.

Mistletoe generally received positive reviews from critics, and was shortlisted for the 2020 British Fantasy Award for Best Horror Novel (August Derleth Award).

== Plot summary ==
Leah Hamilton buys Maitland Farm, a derelict farm in rural Yorkshire. She recently lost her husband and young son, and wants to occupy herself with renovating the farmhouse. She also wants to escape the coming Christmas and start a new life. Leah's only contact with the outside world are her neighbours on the next farm, Cath, her brother Andrew, and Cath's young son, Charlie. They are concerned for Leah's safety, living there on her own, and warn her of Maitland's past.

Unbeknown to her neighbours, Leah's maiden name is Maitland and the farm had belonged to her ancestors over a hundred years ago. Leah is determined not to let the past bother her, but soon starts to see visions of people from long ago. Then she finds herself appearing to slip into the past and witness first hand events from that era. Leah soon learns that a child had been murdered and the man, who locals at the time believed was responsible, was hanged on the farm.

== Background ==
Littlewood said that Mistletoe grew out of her interest in Victorian times and their tradition of telling ghost stories at Christmas time. She explained that while Mistletoe is set in the present-day, the ghosts Leah sees are from the Victorian era. Ideas for Maitland Farm came from several old farmhouses Littlewood had seen around Yorkshire. She said she chose Yorkshire as the novel's setting "because that’s where I live and I’m familiar with it and its folk and the way people talk".

Mistletoe features prominently in the novel, and Littlewood said she incorporated folklore surrounding the plant into the story, including the belief that it made it possible to talk to the dead. She researched folklore for the book extensively, adding that "if I’m going to use folklore or history in a story, I have to use it faithfully, even though I’m writing fiction."

== Critical reception ==
In a review in The Guardian, Eric Brown called Mistletoe Littlewood's "best [novel] yet", adding that it is "a creepy, page-turning triumph enlivened with excellent folkloric details, beautiful descriptions of winter landscapes and sensitive characterisation." A review in The Crack called Mistletoe "[a] superior haunted house story ... with plenty of heart". The reviewer said that while the novel's premise features often in literature, for example Hurley's Starve Acre, and du Maurier's The House on the Strand, Littlewood adds "plenty of new twists" to the theme with "a creeping sense of menace". The reviewer added that the novel's "suspicious neighbours and mistletoe ... takes on Triffid-like qualities."

Writing in the Sci-Fi Bulletin, Marie O’Regan described Mistletoe as "[a] haunting tale of love, loss and betrayal." She said its landscapes are "vivid" and the characters "speak to the heart". O’Regan gave Mistletoe a score of 9/10. Alyson Faye wrote in Horror Tree that Mistletoe is a "beautifully crafted seasonal novel", complete with "Victorian time-slip" and "gorgeous descriptions of the landscape, the farmhouse, and the scenes of Christmas." She complimented Littlewood on the atmosphere she created, which Faye said evokes "aloneness, claustrophobia, snowy silence, isolation, and cold." While Faye described the novel as "slow moving", she felt the reader is rewarded for their patience. She rated Mistletoe 4/5 stars.

== Works cited ==
- Littlewood, Alison (2019). Mistletoe. Jo Fletcher Books. ISBN 978-1-78747-587-8.
