= Cottingley Town Hall =

Municipal building in Cottingley, West Yorkshire, England

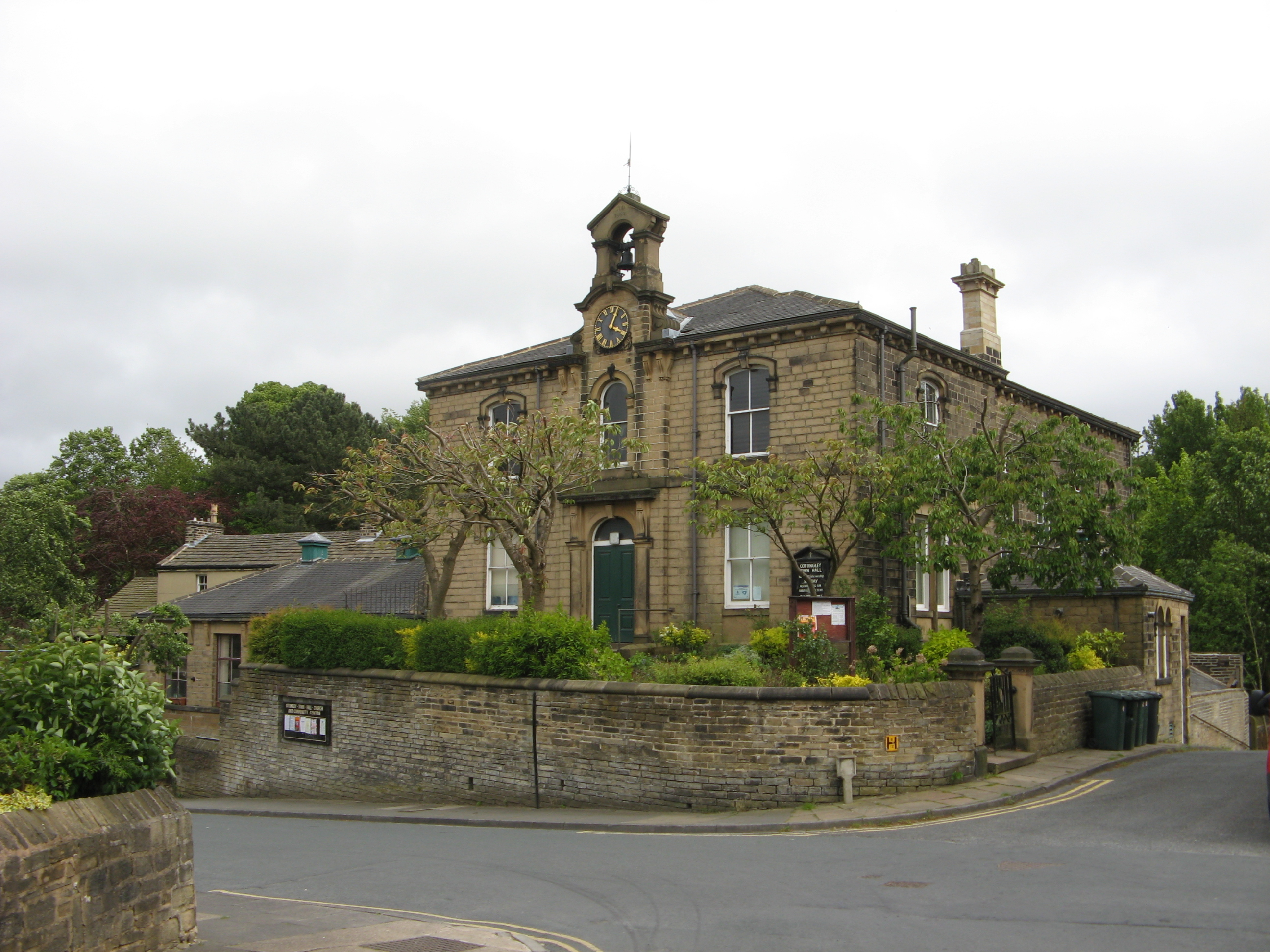
- Cottingley Town Hall

- Shown in West Yorkshire
- 53.8285°N 1.8220°W
- Location: Main Street, Cottingley

History
- Built: 1865

Site notes
- Architect: Samuel Jackson
- Architectural style: Italianate style

Listed Building – Grade II
- Official name: Town Hall
- Designated: 30 April 1982
- Reference no.: 1314305

Cottingley Town Hall is a municipal building in Main Street in Cottingley, West Yorkshire, England. The building, which was used as a church and a community centre, is a Grade II listed building.

== History ==
The building was commissioned by members of the local school committee after the existing school became too small to be functional: the site of the existing school was donated to the committee by a local landowner and philanthropist, Joseph Hollings of Wheatley. An adjacent property, which formed the larger part of the site and was known as Town Hill, was donated to the committee by a locally-born member of parliament, William Ferrand.

The foundation stone for the new building was laid by William Evans Glyde, who was a partner in Messrs Salts, on 26 December 1863. It was designed by Samuel Jackson of Bradford in the Italianate style, built by Messrs Denbigh & Johnson in ashlar stone at a cost of £3,000 and was officially opened by Lord Frederick Cavendish on 21 March 1865. The carpet manufacturer, John Crossley of Halifax, presided at the ceremony.

The design involved a symmetrical main frontage with three bays facing onto Main Street. The central bay, which slightly projected forward, featured a doorway with a fanlight flanked by pilasters and brackets supporting a cornice, with a round headed window on the first floor. The outer bays were fenestrated by sash windows with cornices on the ground floor and by sash windows with archivolts and keystones on the first floor. At roof level, there was a modillioned cornice which was broken by a central section containing a clock supported by volutes and surmounted by a bellcote; the clock was made by Jonathon Cryer of Bingley, a millwright and engineer who built up to a dozen public clocks in the 1860s (of which six, including this one, are known to have survived). Internally, the principal room was the assembly hall, which was capable of accommodating 700 people and intended for use as a school room, as a mechanics' institute and as a place of worship. There was also a library and a reading room as well as a vestry.

The building was placed under the management of a board of trustees which had been formed in 1863. Non-denominational church services were held for while in the building and an organ was installed in 1869. However, following a dispute between the majority of the congregation and the local priest, the Reverend Ebenezer Sloane Heron, part of the congregation relocated to the Oddfellows' Hall in 1870. After Heron had been ejected from the church, services continued to be held in the town hall under the auspices of the "Cottingley Christian Church". Meetings of the Women's Guild were first held there in 1904.

After the First World War, a plaque was installed in the town hall to commemorate the contribution by 147 local service personnel who had served during the conflict. Schooling in the town hall continued until a purpose-built school was completed in School Street in 1933. The building was used as a filming location for the fantasy film, FairyTale: A True Story, which was loosely based on the story of the Cottingley Fairies and was filmed in the local area in 1997. Meanwhile, church services continued throughout the 20th century with the church celebrating its 150th anniversary in 2015.

== See also ==
- Listed buildings in Bingley
