= The Crow Garden =

2017 novel by Alison Littlewood

- First edition cover
- Author: Alison Littlewood
- Cover artist: Leo Nickolls
- Language: English
- Genres: Historical fantasy, horror
- Publisher: Jo Fletcher Books
- Publication date: October 2017
- Publication place: United Kingdom
- Media type: Hardback
- Pages: 372
- ISBN: 978-1-78648-525-0

The Crow Garden is a historical fantasy and horror novel by English writer Alison Littlewood. It was first published in the United Kingdom in October 2017 by Jo Fletcher Books. Set in Victorian England, the book is about an alienist who becomes infatuated with an enigmatic patient of his at a lunatic asylum in Yorkshire.

The Crow Garden generally received mixed to positive reviews from critics. The book was shortlisted for the 2018 British Fantasy Award for Best Horror Novel (August Derleth Award).

== Plot introduction ==
The Crow Garden is narrated by Nathaniel Kerner, a young alienist in Victorian England. In 1856 he travels from London to Yorkshire to take up a position as a "mad doctor" at a lunatic asylum at Crakethorne Manor. The facility is run by Doctor Algernon Chettle, a phrenologist who believes that the shape of a person's skull determines their mental stability. Kerner, on the other hand, subscribes to a new approach of talking and listening to the mentally disturbed.

Kerner is assigned Mrs Harleston, a patient from London committed to the asylum by her husband. He demands that she be cured of her hysteria and delusions so she can be returned to him as his faithful wife. Mrs Harleston is beautiful and demure, and Kerner is immediately drawn to her. He tries talking to her but cannot get her to open up. He calls on the help of a mesmerist in the hope of breaking through her defences, but all it does is to awaken dormant abilities in her. She discovers that she herself can mesmerise people, and changes from being quiet and reserved to dominant and manipulative. By now Kerner in infatuated with her and quickly falls under her spell. Using her new-found abilities, Mrs Harleston escapes Crakethorne.

== Background ==
The Crow Garden is set in Victorian England, and Littlewood said she "read ... widely" about many aspects of Victorian life to create the novel's setting and emulate the gothic tradition of the literature of the time. Littlewood found researching the treatment of mental illness in Victorian times "disturbing", in particular the processes used to certify a person insane. This raised the question, "Is there an empirical line that you cross where you become mad, or is it a question of how many people you have on your side and how many people are buying into this?"

Littlewood stated that Nathaniel is an unreliable narrator because the story is told from his narrow perspective, which includes his perception of Mrs Harleston. She said, "it's interesting when the reader can start to make their own judgements about who's in control of the situation, and are things really as they seem." Littlewood added, "I like to read books where the reader has to do some of the work and draw their own conclusions".

== Critical reception ==
Reviewing the book in the British science fiction magazine, Starburst, Alister Davison described The Crow Garden as "a sublime blend of the psychological and the supernatural" that is "eerie and unsettling". He said Littlewood has produced a Victorian gothic with an atmosphere and descriptions reminiscent of Dickens and the Brontë sisters. In a review for the Historical Novel Society, Douglas Kemp wrote that The Crow Garden "is a well-written and entertaining story" that explores "the murk of mental illness" and its treatments in 19th-century England. He described Kerner as "the epitome of the unreliable narrator", making it difficult for the reader to know what to believe, and said his obsessions with Mrs Harleston leads to a madness of his own.

In a review for the British Fantasy Society, Charlotte Bond called The Crow Garden Littlewood's "best [novel]... by far". She said the author's knowledge of the Victorian era and its medical practices "is outstanding". Bond praised Littlewood's "mixing [of] atmosphere and language", and her portrayal of Crakethorne Manor, which "is so vivid" it becomes one of the book's characters. She said the ending is open-ended and Littlewood leaves it up to the reader to decide what to make of Kerner's "very unreliable ... account", but Bond described the denouement as "brilliantly and subtly done".

Jen Walklate found The Crow Garden "a delightfully indulgent read". Writing in Strange Horizons she said the story centres on mesmerism and Victorian spirituality, and has "a real spook-factor". But Walklate was critical of some aspects of the book. It is full of "nineteenth-century stereotypes" with little character development, in particular the narrator, Kerner. While Walklate acknowledged that Kerner is an unreliable narrator, his actions are so "illogical" it makes it difficult to feel anything for him. Walklate also felt that Littlewood's use of "archaic language" is "florid and forced", and a weak attempt at emulating Victorian literature. Finally, Walklate criticised the book's failure to explore the social issues it raises, for example a women's place in Victorian society, and the impact on those labelled "mad". Instead, the narrative slips into "full-on penny-dreadful hysteria".

== Works cited ==
- Littlewood, Alison (2017). The Crow Garden. Jo Fletcher Books. ISBN 978-1-78648-525-0.
