= A Cold Season =

2012 novel by Alison Littlewood

- First edition cover
- Author: Alison Littlewood
- Language: English
- Genres: Fantasy, horror
- Publisher: Jo Fletcher Books
- Publication date: January 2012
- Publication place: United Kingdom
- Media type: Hardcover
- Pages: 384
- ISBN: 978-1-78087-135-6
- Followed by: A Cold Silence

A Cold Season is a fantasy and horror novel by English writer Alison Littlewood. It is her debut novel and was first published in the United Kingdom in January 2012 by Jo Fletcher Books. It is about a young widow who takes her son to Darnshaw, the village of her birth after her husband went missing in action in Afghanistan; but the village has become sinister and foreboding, and snow storms prevent them from leaving.

A Cold Season was selected for the Richard and Judy Book Club in 2012. Littlewood wrote a sequel, A Cold Silence, which was published in 2015.

== Plot summary ==
Cass is a young widow whose husband went missing in action in Afghanistan. She takes her son, Ben to Darnshaw, a village she grew up in. But Darnshaw is not as she remembers it, and Ben makes it clear he does not want to be there. Then Ben starts to make friends with some of the locals, and his behaviour changes, becoming more and more menacing and violent. Cass makes sinister discoveries about the village and its inhabitants, and wants to leave, but Ben refuses. She tries to leave on her own but cannot because the village has been cut off from the outside world by snow storms.

== Critical reception ==
Reviewing A Cold Season in Booklist, Alison Downs described it as a "classic supernatural story with gothic undertones". She said that while the story "isn't perfect, and some themes are overdone", it "hits some very high and scary notes." A review in Publishers Weekly said A Cold Season is a "well-established trope in horror" and "is entirely familiar and predictable". The reviewer felt that Littlewood has not done enough to make the story stand out and impress.

In a review in Library Journal, Peter Petruski called A Cold Season a "creepy, claustrophobic debut". He said it brings to mind classic horror novels and films, but also tends to be "a tad predictable and formulaic". He complained that the book's protagonist, Cass is "incredibly unlikable ... makes unrealistically poor decisions and takes a ridiculously long time to figure out what is going on." Notwithstanding these criticisms, Petruski stated that "the novel builds a real sense of foreboding and dread, which creates a chilling reading experience for fans of demonic and religious horror."

Ross Warren wrote in This Is Horror that A Cold Season is a "gripping and superbly paced book". He said Littlewood's prose lifts it above the well-worn tropes that often features in horror stories like this. The characters are "believable, flawed individuals", and the supernatural elements are "well handled". Warren was a little critical of the twist at the end, which he felt belonged to a "low budget, horror-movie-of-the-week", but still praised the work for being "a remarkable debut novel that deserves to stand amongst some of the other great debut horror novels of recent years".
