= The Hidden People =

2016 novel by Alison Littlewood

- First edition cover
- Author: Alison Littlewood
- Cover artist: Leo Nickolls
- Language: English
- Genres: Historical fantasy, horror
- Publisher: Jo Fletcher Books
- Publication date: October 2016
- Publication place: United Kingdom
- Media type: Hardback
- Pages: 376
- ISBN: 978-1-84866-990-1

The Hidden People is a historical fantasy and horror novel by English writer Alison Littlewood, first published in October 2016 in the United Kingdom by Jo Fletcher Books. It is based on the 1895 incident in County Tipperary, Ireland, where Bridget Cleary was burnt alive by her husband, who believed she was a fairy changeling.

The Hidden People generally received positive reviews from critics. The book was nominated for the 2017 British Fantasy Award for Best Horror Novel (August Derleth Award). It was also nominated for the 2017 Dragon Awards, but the nomination was withdrawn at Littlewood's request.

== Plot introduction ==
While visiting the Great Exhibition in London in 1851, Albie meets Lizzie, his rural cousin from northern England, for the first time. They only spend a few hours together at the event, but during that time he falls in love with her. He does not see or hear from her again, and in 1862 Albie's father tells him that Lizzie had been burnt to death by her husband. Albie, who is now married to Helena and living in London, is horrified that anyone could do such a terrible thing to his cousin. Albie learns that Jeremy, Lizzie's husband, believed that his wife had been abducted by fairies and replaced with a changeling.

Albie is determined to get to the bottom of what happened to Lizzie and travels to the village of Halfoak in Yorkshire where she had lived. He finds a community steeped in superstition and believing in fairies and changelings. He discovers that Lizzie has not even been buried yet, and that her charred remains are stored in a washhouse. Helena arrives unexpectedly to support her husband and attends a funeral Albie has organised for his cousin. None of the locals attend.

Albie and Helena move into Lizzie's now vacant cottage. Albie struggles to find the answers he wants, and refuses to believe in the creatures that the villagers say inhabit a fairy mound near the cottage. But Albie keeps experiencing strange events that make him wonder whether there is some truth to all this "fairy nonsense". When Albie sees Helena start to behave strangely and not being herself, he questions whether she really is his wife.

== Background ==
The Hidden People is based on the 1895 (Note: Bridget Cleary was murdered in 1895, not 1894 or 1896 as some sources suggest.) incident in Clonmel, County Tipperary in Ireland where Bridget Cleary, an Irish dressmaker, was burnt alive by her husband because he maintained that fairies had abducted her and replaced her with a changeling. In 19th-century rural Ireland, superstitious beliefs in fairies and other mythological creatures were strong amongst the working classes. Folklore at the time deemed that setting someone on fire would banish the changeling and bring back the stolen person.

Even though Cleary's murder took place in Ireland, most of The Hidden People was set in Yorkshire in northern England. Littlewood explained in an interview that she chose Yorkshire because it was "close to home" and she "knew the voices". She researched Albie's "Victorian-esque" way of speaking and Yorkshire's historical language, plus many aspects of Victorian life, including folklore of the era. Littlewood noted that Albie is an unreliable narrator, in that the story is told from his narrow perspective, which includes his perception of women. She said, "it's interesting when the reader can start to make their own judgements about who's in control of the situation, and are things really as they seem." Littlewood added, "I like to read books where the reader has to do some of the work and draw their own conclusions".

Littlewood said that she was inspired to write The Hidden People by British horror novelist Simon Clark. Clark had asked her to contribute a short story to The Mammoth Book of Sherlock Holmes Abroad, an anthology he was preparing. Littlewood explained that she did not know Sherlock Holmes very well, nor the era he featured in. She realised that undertaking such a task would be "a research-heavy nightmare", but she was "intrigued" by the idea and agreed to write a story. After immersing herself in the world of Sherlock Holmes, Littlewood found that she "loved it all: not just the characters, but [Conan Doyle's] wonderful use of language." The short story she wrote was "The Mystery of the Red City", (Note: "The Mystery of the Red City" was published in July 2015 in Simon Clark's anthology, The Mammoth Book of Sherlock Holmes Abroad.) and it prompted Littlewood to try her hand at a historical novel set in Victorian times.

== Critical reception ==
In a review of The Hidden People for the British Fantasy Society, Richard Webb wrote that the central theme of the book is whether fairies and their mischievous magic exist or not. He noted that Littlewood is careful not to commit herself either way and teases the reader between belief and disbelief. Webb said the novel is well researched, accurately recreating the period, the Victorian language, and "the idiosyncrasies of Yorkshire dialect". Albie is the "archetypal Victorian Gentleman", and is "priggish, uptight and insecure" with "little inkling of his privilege or his patronising attitude towards both the rural community and his wife". Webb felt that while the tone of the book does slow down the pace a little, the characters have "a more rounded sense of class and context". Webb concluded, "All told, it is well worth staying with the slow-burn first half for the more engrossing second act."

British speculative fiction writer Nina Allan said that The Hidden People's narrative and plot are meticulously constructed, and the ending leaves it "satisfyingly open-ended". Writing in Strange Horizons she described the book as a horror story and a fairy tale "underpinned by a strong feminist subtext". Allan characterised Lizzie and Helena's relationships with their husbands as mirrors of the status of all women in Victorian society, namely that they must be "pliable, pleasant, unobtrusive" and seek "guidance and support" from men. Any deviation by women from these expectations is seen by their guardians to be "so inexplicable it can only be explained as supernatural".

In a review at Tor.com, Niall Alexander called The Hidden People Littlewood's "most accomplished effort yet", although "not necessarily her most accessible". He said the book "isn't the easiest of reads", and the Yorkshire dialect "makes it doubly difficult", but added that the author's use of period English and the inclusion of the quaint language of Halfoak "does wonders for [the novel's] sense of place and time". He found The Hidden People "deeply uneasy reading". Suspicion and uncertainty drive the story, and Alexander complimented Littlewood on how she maintains this tension throughout. He concluded, "It might be a little overlong, and its sentences somewhat stiff, but work at it and it will, I'm sure, work on you."

A reviewer in Kirkus Reviews stated that while Littlewood "expertly creates an atmosphere of unease", Albie's misogyny, although common in Victorian times, could be "off-putting for a modern audience". The reviewer felt that Albie's 'lack of empathy' for others, particularly his wife, makes him an unpleasant character, and added that "it seems to be more a novel of men versus women rather than old ways versus new ways, and female readers should feel uncomfortable about this dichotomy.' "

== Dragon Awards nomination ==
The Hidden People was nominated for the 2017 Dragon Awards, but Littlewood requested that it be withdrawn. She said she had discovered that her book was chosen "by a voting bloc who are attempting, for reasons of their own, to influence the awards outcome." The Verge reported that fandom factions were behind the vote rigging and were "looking to score victories for their 'side' in the culture wars".

John Scalzi also received a Dragon nomination for his novel The Collapsing Empire, and he too requested that it be withdrawn, stating that voters were "trying to use the book and me as a prop ... to advance a manufactured 'us vs. them' vote-pumping narrative based on ideology or whatever". Initially, the award organisers Dragon Con stated that they would not allow Littlewood and Scalzi to withdraw their nominations, but after receiving feedback and criticism from the convention community, they informed the authors that they would be permitted to remove their nominations.

After reading about Littlewood's request to have her nomination withdrawn denied, and then granted, N. K. Jemisin, who also had reservations about the Dragon Awards voting process, decided to withdraw her nomination for The Obelisk Gate. She stated that "when it became clear that the opacity of the voting process was intentional ... [that] there was no way to know if my book's presence on the list was legitimately earned through individual, freely-chosen votes by a representative sampling of DragonCon members ... a gentle ping of flak warning went off in my mind."^{[italics in the source]}

== See also ==
- The Good People

== Works cited ==
- Littlewood, Alison (2016). The Hidden People. Jo Fletcher Books. ISBN 978-1-84866-990-1.
