= Alison Littlewood =

British author

- Born: Alison J. Littlewood; Penistone, South Yorkshire, England
- Occupations: Novelist, short story writer
- Writing career
- Pen name: A. J. Elwood
- Period: 2006–present
- Genres: Horror, fantasy
- Notable awards: Shirley Jackson Award
- Website: alisonlittlewood.co.uk

Alison Littlewood is a British author of horror novels and short stories. She also writes under the name Alison J. Littlewood and the pen name A. J. Elwood.

Littlewood grew up in Penistone, South Yorkshire. She attended Northumbria University where she studied English and history. She began a career in marketing, but later switched to writing fiction. Littlewood currently lives in Doncaster, South Yorkshire with her partner.

== Bibliography ==
- A Cold Season (2012)
- Path of Needles (2013)
- The Unquiet House (2014)
- Zombie Apocalypse! Acapulcalypse Now (2015)
- A Cold Silence (2015)
- The Hidden People (2016)
- The Crow Garden (2017)
- Mistletoe (2019)
- The Cottingley Cuckoo (April 2021) – using the pen name A. J. Elwood
- The Other Lives of Miss Emily White (April 2023) – using the pen name A. J. Elwood

== Awards ==
- British Fantasy Award for Best Horror Novel (August Derleth Award) for Path of Needles (2014, shortlisted)
- Shirley Jackson Award for Novel: The Unquiet House (2014, nominated)|
- Shirley Jackson Award for Short Fiction: "The Dogs Home" (The Spectral Book of Horror Stories, Spectral Press). (2014, winner)
- British Fantasy Award for Best Horror Novel (August Derleth Award) for The Unquiet House (2015, shortlisted)
- British Fantasy Award for Best Horror Novel (August Derleth Award) for A Cold Silence (2016, shortlisted)
