= Cottingley Fairies =

Hoax photograph series

The first of the five photographs, taken by Elsie Wright in 1917, shows Frances Griffiths with the alleged fairies.

The Cottingley Fairies are the subject of a hoax which purported to provide evidence of the existence of fairies. They appear in a series of five photographs taken by Elsie Wright and Frances Griffiths, two young cousins who lived in Cottingley, near Bradford in England. In 1917, when the first two photographs were taken, Elsie was 16 years old and Frances was 9. The pictures came to the attention of writer Sir Arthur Conan Doyle, who used them to illustrate an article on fairies he had been commissioned to write for the Christmas 1920 edition of The Strand Magazine. Doyle was enthusiastic about the photographs, and interpreted them as clear and visible evidence of supernatural phenomena. Public reaction was mixed; some accepted the images as genuine, others believed that they had been faked.

Interest in the Cottingley Fairies gradually declined after 1921. Both girls married and lived abroad for a time after they grew up, and yet the photographs continued to hold the public imagination. In 1966 a reporter from the Daily Express newspaper traced Elsie, who had by then returned to the United Kingdom. Elsie left open the possibility that she believed she had photographed her thoughts, and the media once again became interested in the story.

Comparison of Cottingley Fairies and illustrations from Princess Mary's Gift Book

In the early 1980s Elsie and Frances admitted that the photographs were faked, using cardboard cutouts of fairies copied from a popular children's book of the time, but Frances maintained that the fifth and final photograph was genuine. As of 2019 the photographs and the cameras used are in the collections of the National Science and Media Museum in Bradford, England.

== 1917 photographs ==
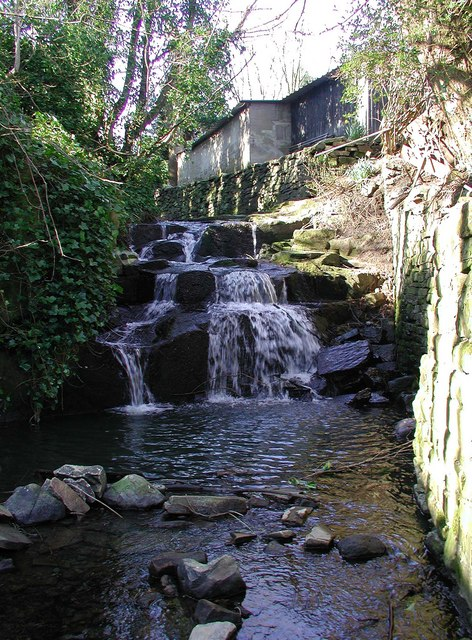
Cottingley Beck, where Frances and Elsie claimed to have seen the fairies

In mid-1917 nine-year-old Frances Griffiths and her mother – both newly arrived in England from South Africa – were staying with Frances's aunt, Elsie Wright's mother, Polly, in the village of Cottingley in West Yorkshire; Elsie was then 16 years old. The two girls often played together beside the beck at the bottom of the garden, much to their mothers' annoyance, because they frequently came back with wet feet and clothes. Frances and Elsie said they only went to the beck to see the fairies, and to prove it, Elsie borrowed her father's camera, a Midg quarter-plate. The girls returned about 30 minutes later, "triumphant".

Elsie's father, Arthur, was a keen amateur photographer, and had set up his own darkroom. The picture on the photographic plate he developed showed Frances behind a bush in the foreground, on which four fairies appeared to be dancing. Knowing his daughter's artistic ability, and that she had spent some time working in a photographer's studio, he dismissed the figures as cardboard cutouts. Two months later the girls borrowed his camera again, and this time returned with a photograph of Elsie sitting on the lawn holding out her hand to a 1-foot-tall (30 cm) gnome. Exasperated by what he believed to be "nothing but a prank", and convinced that the girls must have tampered with his camera in some way, Arthur Wright refused to lend it to them again. His wife Polly, however, believed the photographs to be authentic.

I am learning French, Geometry, Cookery and Algebra at school now. Dad came home from France the other week after being there ten months, and we all think the war will be over in a few days ... I am sending two photos, both of me, one of me in a bathing costume in our back yard, while the other is me with some fairies. Elsie took that one.

— Letter from Frances Griffiths to a friend in South Africa

Towards the end of 1918, Frances sent a letter to Johanna Parvin, a friend in Cape Town, South Africa, where Frances had lived for most of her life, enclosing the photograph of herself with the fairies. On the back she wrote "It is funny, I never used to see them in Africa. It must be too hot for them there."

The photographs became public in mid-1919, after Elsie's mother attended a meeting of the Theosophical Society in Bradford. The lecture that evening was on "fairy life", and at the end of the meeting Polly Wright showed the two fairy photographs taken by her daughter and niece to the speaker. As a result, the photographs were displayed at the society's annual conference in Harrogate, held a few months later. There they came to the attention of a leading member of the society, Edward Gardner. One of the central beliefs of theosophy is that humanity is undergoing a cycle of evolution, towards increasing "perfection", and Gardner recognised the potential significance of the photographs for the movement:

the fact that two young girls had not only been able to see fairies, which others had done, but had actually for the first time ever been able to materialise them at a density sufficient for their images to be recorded on a photographic plate, meant that it was possible that the next cycle of evolution was underway.

== Initial examinations ==
Gardner sent the prints along with the original glass-plate negatives to Harold Snelling, a photography expert. Snelling's opinion was that "the two negatives are entirely genuine, unfaked photographs ... [with] no trace whatsoever of studio work involving card or paper models". He did not go so far as to say that the photographs showed fairies, stating only that "these are straight forward photographs of whatever was in front of the camera at the time". Gardner had the prints "clarified" by Snelling, and new negatives produced, "more conducive to printing", for use in the illustrated lectures he gave around Britain. Snelling supplied the photographic prints which were available for sale at Gardner's lectures.

The second of the five photographs, showing Elsie with a winged gnome

Author and prominent spiritualist Sir Arthur Conan Doyle learned of the photographs from the editor of the spiritualist publication Light. Doyle had been commissioned by The Strand Magazine to write an article on fairies for their Christmas issue, and the fairy photographs "must have seemed like a godsend" according to broadcaster and historian Magnus Magnusson. Doyle contacted Gardner in June 1920 to determine the background to the photographs, and wrote to Elsie and her father to request permission from the latter to use the prints in his article. Arthur Wright was "obviously impressed" that Doyle was involved, and gave his permission for publication, but he refused payment on the grounds that, if genuine, the images should not be "soiled" by money.

Gardner and Doyle sought a second expert opinion from the photographic company Kodak. Several of the company's technicians examined the enhanced prints, and although they agreed with Snelling that the pictures "showed no signs of being faked", they concluded that "this could not be taken as conclusive evidence ... that they were authentic photographs of fairies". Kodak declined to issue a certificate of authenticity. Gardner believed that the Kodak technicians might not have examined the photographs entirely objectively, observing that one had commented "after all, as fairies couldn't be true, the photographs must have been faked somehow". The prints were also examined by another photographic company, Ilford, who reported unequivocally that there was "some evidence of faking". Gardner and Doyle, perhaps rather optimistically, interpreted the results of the three expert evaluations as two in favour of the photographs' authenticity and one against.

Doyle also showed the photographs to the physicist and pioneering psychical researcher Sir Oliver Lodge, who believed the photographs to be fake. He suggested that a troupe of dancers had masqueraded as fairies, and expressed doubt as to their "distinctly 'Parisienne'" hairstyles.

== 1920 photographs ==
Doyle was preoccupied with organising an imminent lecture tour of Australia, and in July 1920, sent Gardner to meet the Wright family. By this point, Frances was living with her parents in Scarborough, but Elsie's father told Gardner that he had been so certain the photographs were fakes that while the girls were away he searched their bedroom and the area around the beck (stream), looking for scraps of pictures or cutouts, but found nothing "incriminating".

Frances and the Leaping Fairy, the third photograph

Gardner believed the Wright family to be honest and respectable. To place the matter of the photographs' authenticity beyond doubt, he returned to Cottingley at the end of July with two W. Butcher & Sons Cameo folding plate cameras and 24 secretly marked photographic plates. Frances was invited to stay with the Wright family during the school summer holiday so that she and Elsie could take more pictures of the fairies. Gardner described his briefing in his 1945 Fairies: A Book of Real Fairies:

I went off, to Cottingley again, taking the two cameras and plates from London, and met the family and explained to the two girls the simple working of the cameras, giving one each to keep. The cameras were loaded, and my final advice was that they need go up to the glen only on fine days as they had been accustomed to do before and tice the fairies, as they called their way of attracting them, and see what they could get. I suggested only the most obvious and easy precautions about lighting and distance, for I knew it was essential they should feel free and unhampered and have no burden of responsibility. If nothing came of it all, I told them, they were not to mind a bit.

Until 19 August the weather was unsuitable for photography. Because Frances and Elsie insisted that the fairies would not show themselves if others were watching, Elsie's mother was persuaded to visit her sister's for tea, leaving the girls alone. In her absence the girls took several photographs, two of which appeared to show fairies. In the first, Frances and the Leaping Fairy, Frances is shown in profile with a winged fairy close by her nose. The second, Fairy offering Posy of Harebells to Elsie, shows a fairy either hovering or tiptoeing on a branch, and offering Elsie a flower. Two days later the girls took the last picture, Fairies and Their Sun-Bath.

The plates were packed in cotton wool and returned to Gardner in London, who sent an "ecstatic" telegram to Doyle, by then in Melbourne. Doyle wrote back:

My heart was gladdened when out here in far Australia I had your note and the three wonderful pictures which are confirmatory of our published results. When our fairies are admitted other psychic phenomena will find a more ready acceptance ... We have had continued messages at seances for some time that a visible sign was coming through.

== Publication and reaction ==
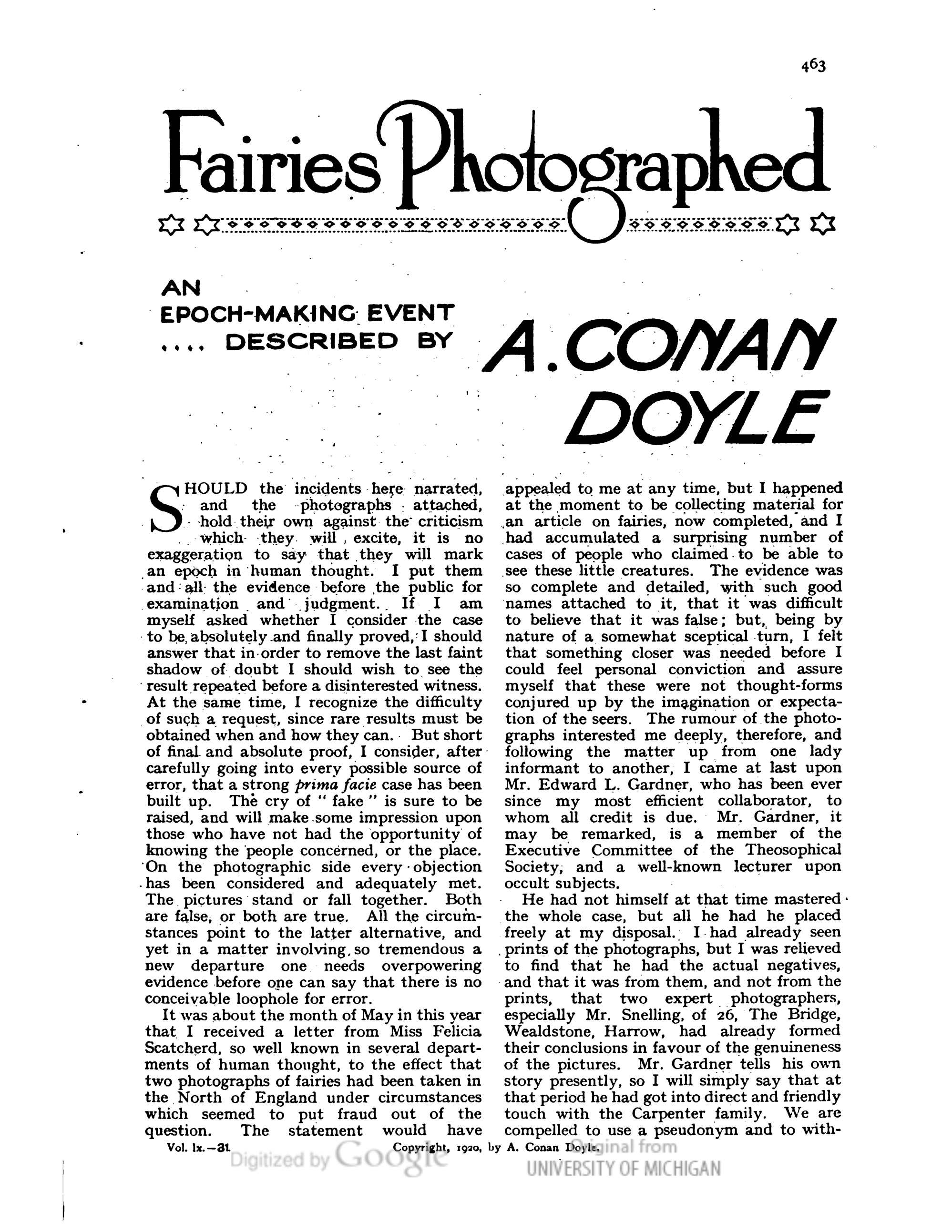
The first page of Doyle's article in Strand Magazine

The fourth photograph, Fairy Offering Posy of Harebells to Elsie

Doyle's article in the December 1920 issue of The Strand contained two higher-resolution prints of the 1917 photographs, and sold out within days of publication. To protect the girls' anonymity, Frances and Elsie were called Alice and Iris respectively, and the Wright family was referred to as the "Carpenters". An enthusiastic and committed spiritualist, Doyle hoped that if the photographs convinced the public of the existence of fairies then they might more readily accept other psychic phenomena. He ended his article with the words:

The recognition of their existence will jolt the material twentieth-century mind out of its heavy ruts in the mud, and will make it admit that there is a glamour and mystery to life. Having discovered this, the world will not find it so difficult to accept that spiritual message supported by physical facts which have already been put before it.

Early press coverage was "mixed", generally a combination of "embarrassment and puzzlement"; though Japanese scholar Kaori Inuma has noted that there were also open and positive assessments. The historical novelist and poet Maurice Hewlett published a series of articles in the literary journal John O' London's Weekly, in which he concluded: "And knowing children, and knowing that Sir Arthur Conan Doyle has legs, I decide that the Miss Carpenters have pulled one of them." The London newspaper Truth on 5 January 1921 expressed a similar view; "For the true explanation of these fairy photographs what is wanted is not a knowledge of occult phenomena but a knowledge of children." Some public figures were more sympathetic. Margaret McMillan, the educational and social reformer, wrote: "How wonderful that to these dear children such a wonderful gift has been vouchsafed." The novelist Henry De Vere Stacpoole decided to take the fairy photographs and the girls at face value. In a letter to Gardner he wrote: "Look at Alice's [Frances'] face. Look at Iris's [Elsie's] face. There is an extraordinary thing called Truth which has 10 million faces and forms – it is God's currency and the cleverest coiner or forger can't imitate it."

Major John Hall-Edwards, a keen photographer and pioneer of medical X-ray treatments in Britain, was a particularly vigorous critic:

On the evidence I have no hesitation in saying that these photographs could have been "faked". I criticize the attitude of those who declared there is something supernatural in the circumstances attending to the taking of these pictures because, as a medical man, I believe that the inculcation of such absurd ideas into the minds of children will result in later life in manifestations and nervous disorder and mental disturbances.

Doyle used the later photographs in 1921 to illustrate a second article in The Strand, in which he described other accounts of fairy sightings. The article formed the foundation for his 1922 book The Coming of the Fairies. As before, the photographs were received with mixed credulity. Sceptics noted that the fairies "looked suspiciously like the traditional fairies of nursery tales" and that they had "very fashionable hairstyles".

== Gardner's final visit ==
Gardner made a final visit to Cottingley in August 1921. He again brought cameras and photographic plates for Frances and Elsie, but was accompanied by the occultist Geoffrey Hodson. Although neither of the girls claimed to see any fairies, and there were no more photographs, "on the contrary, he [Hodson] saw them [fairies] everywhere" and wrote voluminous notes on his observations.

By now Elsie and Frances were tired of the whole fairy business. Years later Elsie looked at a photograph of herself and Frances taken with Hodson and said: "Look at that, fed up with fairies." Both Elsie and Frances later admitted that they "played along" with Hodson "out of mischief", and that they considered him "a fake".

== Later investigations ==
Public interest in the Cottingley Fairies gradually subsided after 1921. Elsie and Frances both eventually married, moved away from the area and each lived overseas for varying periods of time. In 1966 a reporter from the Daily Express newspaper traced Elsie, who was by then back in England. She admitted in an interview given that year that the fairies might have been "figments of my imagination", but left open the possibility she believed that she had somehow managed to photograph her thoughts. The media subsequently became interested in Frances and Elsie's photographs once again. BBC television's Nationwide programme investigated the case in 1971, but Elsie stuck to her story: "I've told you that they're photographs of figments of our imagination, and that's what I'm sticking to".

Elsie and Frances were interviewed by journalist Austin Mitchell in September 1976 for a programme broadcast on Yorkshire Television. When pressed, both women agreed that "a rational person doesn't see fairies", but they denied having fabricated the photographs. In 1978 the magician and scientific sceptic James Randi and a team from the Committee for the Scientific Investigation of Claims of the Paranormal examined the photographs, using a "computer enhancement process". They concluded that the photographs were fakes, and that strings could be seen supporting the fairies. Geoffrey Crawley, editor of the British Journal of Photography, undertook a "major scientific investigation of the photographs and the events surrounding them", published between 1982 and 1983, "the first major postwar analysis of the affair". He also concluded that the pictures were fakes.

== Confession ==
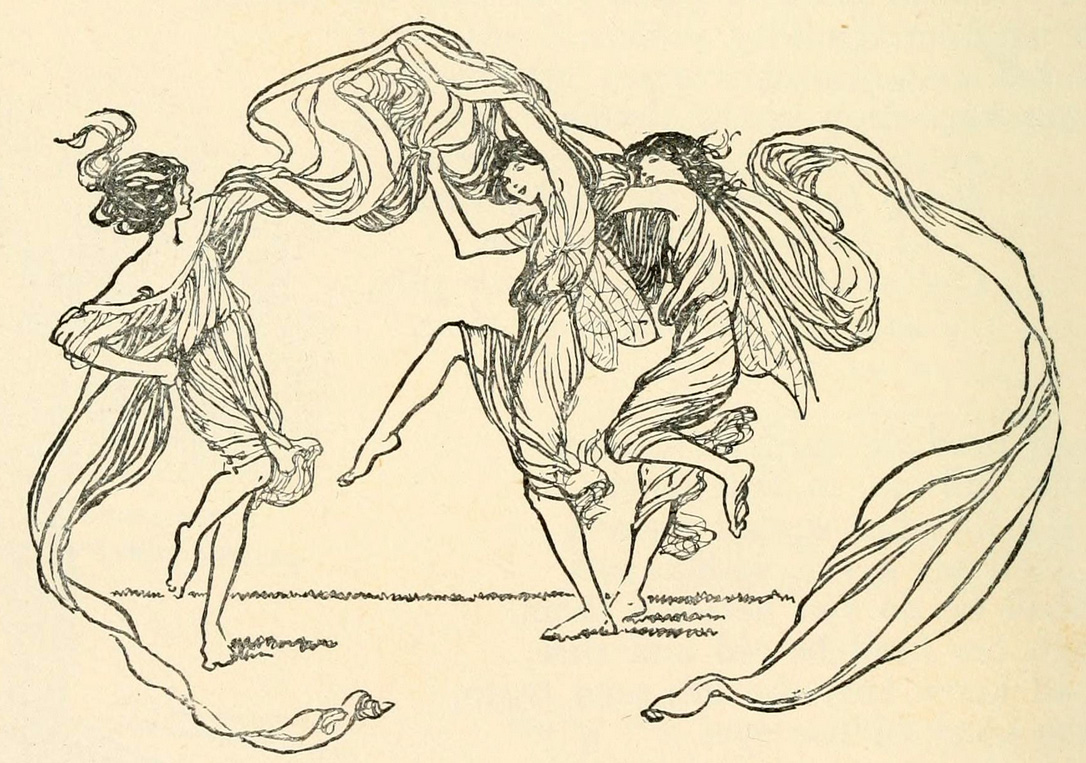
One of Claude A. Shepperson's illustrations of dancing fairies, from Princess Mary's Gift Book

In 1983, the cousins admitted in an article published in the magazine The Unexplained that the photographs had been faked, although both maintained that they really had seen fairies. Elsie had copied illustrations of three dancing fairies by Claude Shepperson from a book that Frances had brought back with her from South Africa. This was the Princess Mary's Gift Book, published towards the beginning of the war. Elsie changed few details but added wings. It is possible that a poem attached to the images by Alfred Noyes also inspired Elsie and Frances. They said they had then cut out the cardboard figures and supported them with hatpins, disposing of their props in the beck once the photograph had been taken. But the cousins disagreed about the fifth and final photograph, which Doyle in his The Coming of the Fairies described in this way:

Seated on the upper left hand edge with wing well displayed is an undraped fairy apparently considering whether it is time to get up. An earlier riser of more mature age is seen on the right possessing abundant hair and wonderful wings. Her slightly denser body can be glimpsed within her fairy dress.

Fairies and Their Sun-Bath, the fifth and last photograph of the Cottingley Fairies

Comparison of Cottingley Fairies and illustrations from Princess Mary's Gift Book

Elsie maintained it was a fake, just like all the others, but Frances insisted that it was genuine. In an interview given in the early 1980s Frances said:

It was a wet Saturday afternoon and we were just mooching about with our cameras and Elsie had nothing prepared. I saw these fairies building up in the grasses and just aimed the camera and took a photograph.

Both Frances and Elsie claimed to have taken the fifth photograph. In a letter published in The Times newspaper on 9 April 1983, Geoffrey Crawley explained the discrepancy by suggesting that the photograph was "an unintended double exposure of fairy cutouts in the grass", and thus "both ladies can be quite sincere in believing that they each took it".

In a 1985 interview on Yorkshire Television's Arthur C. Clarke's World of Strange Powers, Elsie said that she and Frances were too embarrassed to admit the truth after fooling Doyle, the author of Sherlock Holmes: "Two village kids and a brilliant man like Conan Doyle – well, we could only keep quiet." In the same interview Frances said: "I never even thought of it as being a fraud – it was just Elsie and I having a bit of fun and I can't understand to this day why they were taken in – they wanted to be taken in."

== Subsequent history ==
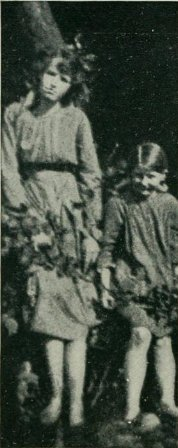
Elsie Wright and Frances Griffiths, June 1917

Frances died in 1986 and Elsie in 1988. Prints of their photographs of the fairies, along with a few other items including a first edition of Doyle's book The Coming of the Fairies, were sold at auction in London for £21,620 in 1998. That same year, Geoffrey Crawley sold his Cottingley Fairy material to the National Museum of Film, Photography and Television in Bradford (now the National Science and Media Museum), where it is on display. The collection included prints of the photographs, two of the cameras used by the girls, watercolours of fairies painted by Elsie, and a nine-page letter from Elsie admitting to the hoax. The glass photographic plates were bought for £6,000 by an unnamed buyer at a London auction held in 2001.

Frances's daughter, Christine Lynch, appeared in an episode of the television programme Antiques Roadshow in Belfast, broadcast on BBC One in January 2009, with the photographs and one of the cameras given to the girls by Doyle. Christine told the expert, Paul Atterbury, that she believed, as her mother had done, that the fairies in the fifth photograph were genuine. Atterbury estimated the value of the items at between £25,000 and £30,000. The first edition of Frances's memoirs was published a few months later, under the title Reflections on the Cottingley Fairies. The book contains correspondence, sometimes "bitter", between Elsie and Frances. In one letter, dated 1983, Frances wrote:

I hated those photographs from the age of 16 when Mr Gardner presented me with a bunch of flowers and wanted me to sit on the platform [at a Theosophical Society meeting] with him. I realised what I was in for if I did not keep myself hidden.

The 1997 films FairyTale: A True Story and Photographing Fairies were inspired by the events surrounding the Cottingley Fairies. The photographs were parodied in a 1994 book written by Terry Jones and Brian Froud, Lady Cottington's Pressed Fairy Book. In A. J. Elwood's 2021 novel, The Cottingley Cuckoo, a series of letters were written soon after the Cottingley fairy photographs were published claiming further sightings of fairies and proof of their existence.

In 2017 a further two fairy photographs were presented as evidence that the girls' parents were part of the conspiracy. Dating from 1917 and 1918, both photographs are poorly executed copies of two of the original fairy photographs. One was published in 1918 in The Sphere newspaper, which was before the originals had been seen by anyone outside the girls' immediate family.

On 4 October 2018 the first two of the photographs, Alice and the Fairies and Iris and the Gnome, were to be sold by Dominic Winter Auctioneers, in Gloucestershire. The prints, suspected to have been made in 1920 to sell at theosophical lectures, were expected to bring £700–£1000 each. As it turned out, Iris with the Gnome sold for a hammer price of £5,400 (plus 24% buyer's premium incl. VAT), while Alice and the Fairies sold for a hammer price of £15,000 (plus 24% buyer's premium incl. VAT).

In 2019 a print of the first of the five photographs sold for £1,050. A print of the second was also put up for sale but failed to sell as it did not meet its £500 reserve price. The pictures previously belonged to the Reverend George Vale Owen. In December 2019, the third camera used to take the images was acquired by the National Science and Media Museum.
