= Cottingley, Bradford =

Village in West Yorkshire, England

Coordinates: 53.829504°N 1.830787°W

Cottingley
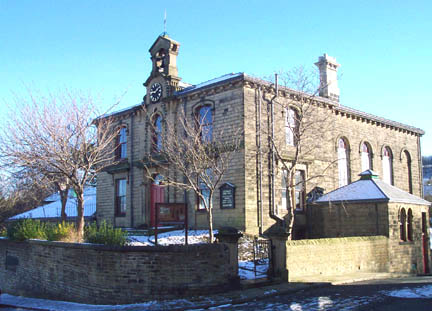
- Cottingley Town Hall

- Location within West Yorkshire
- OS grid reference: SE112370
- Metropolitan borough: City of Bradford
- Metropolitan county: West Yorkshire
- Region: Yorkshire and the Humber
- Country: England
- Sovereign state: United Kingdom
- Post town: BINGLEY
- Postcode district: BD16
- Dialling code: 01274
- Police: West Yorkshire
- Fire: West Yorkshire
- Ambulance: Yorkshire
- UK Parliament: Shipley

Cottingley is a suburban village within the City of Bradford district in West Yorkshire, England between Shipley and Bingley. It is known for the Cottingley Fairies, which appeared in a series of photographs taken there during the early 20th century.

== Etymology ==
The village is first mentioned in the Domesday Book of 1086 as Cotingelai in the wapentake of Skyrack and the lands of Erneis of Buron. The first element is the personal name Cotta (the origin of which is unknown), and the second the suffix -ingas denoting a group of associated people. Thus the Cottingas were a group descended from or otherwise associated with someone called Cotta. This group name was then compounded with the Old English word lēah ('open land in a wood'). Thus the name once meant 'the clearing of the descendants of Cotta'.

== History ==
The village was clustered around the original St Michael's Church, Cottingley Town Hall and the Sun Inn. This village was 2.5 miles (4 km) from Bingley, with Cottingley Bridge a mile closer.

In 1917, two girls, 15-year old Elsie Wright and nine-year old Frances Griffiths, claimed to have photographed fairies in the dell (Cottingley Beck) at the bottom of their garden. This led to the Cottingley Fairies hoax, which still resonates in the village into the modern day. The village has a festival to celebrate the story (Cottingley Fairy Fest), and in 1997, parts of a film inspired by the story, FairyTale: A True Story, were filmed in the village.

== Governance ==
Cottingley is part of Bingley Rural Ward on Bradford City Council and part of the Parliamentary constituency of Shipley, represented since 2024 by the Labour MP Anna Dixon. At the 2011 Census, Bingley Rural Ward, which includes Cullingworth, Denholme, Harden and Wilsden, had a population of 17,895.

== Geography ==
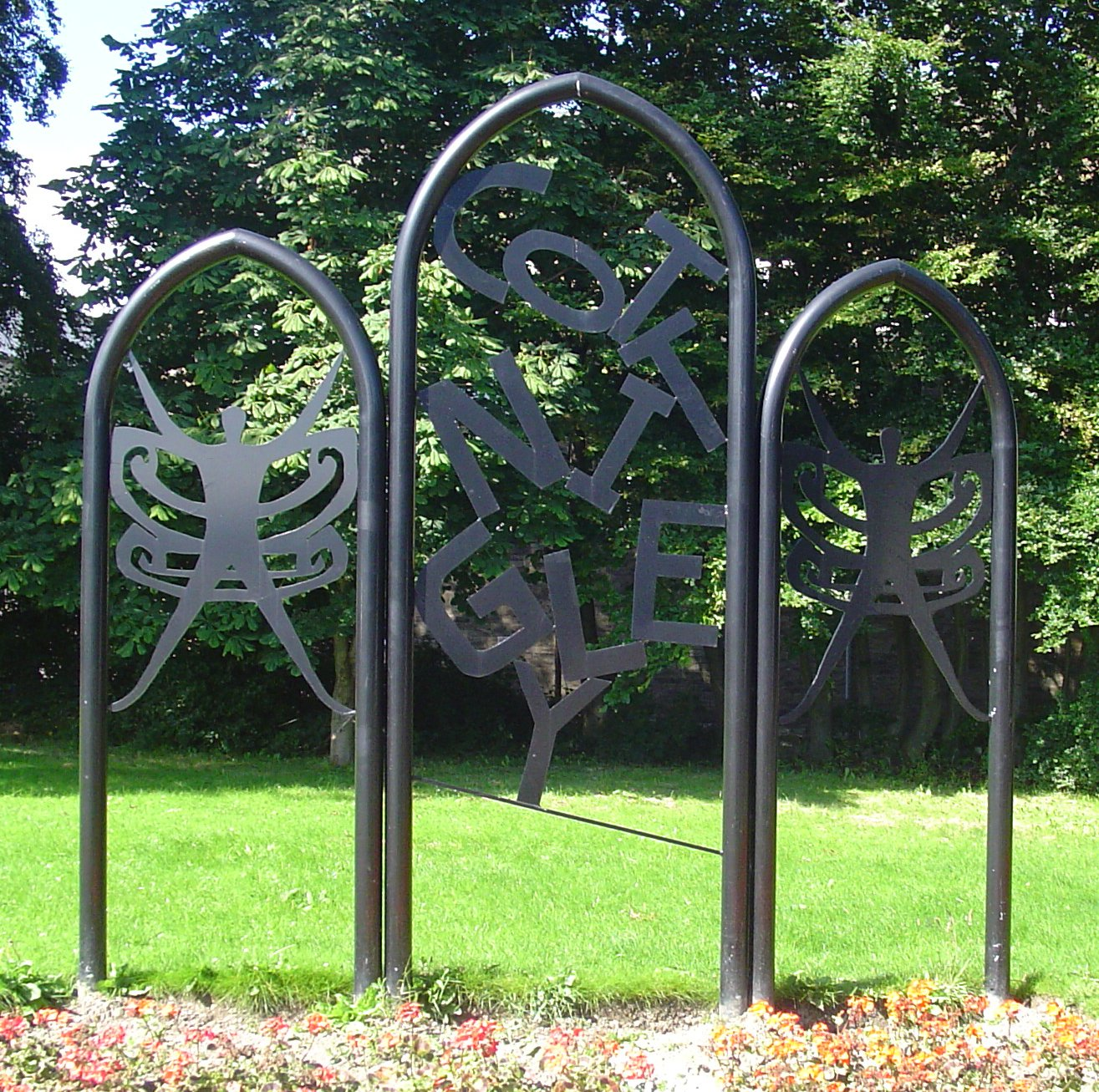
Fairies signpost in Cottingley

The village is in the Aire Valley between Shipley and Bingley approximately 330 feet (100 m) above sea level with the River Aire to the north. The road through the village has been changed at least twice. Originally, to exit south from Bingley, travellers had to cross Ireland Bridge then Beckfoot Bridge and approach Cottingley on the south side of the river. The bridge across the River Aire leading towards Bingley was built by 1649, when it appears in the Book of Bridges in the Session Rolls of Wakefield. It was recorded in 1664 that "a great floode hath taken away the foundations so that the whole bridge is shrunke." Cottingley Bridge was rebuilt and in the early 19th century, it was a hamlet independent of Cottingley.

The A650 road is now to the north of Cottingley after a bypass was built and opened in 2003. The land to the east of the B6269 is mainly flat and to the west rises to a height of 560 feet (170 m) at March Cote Farm. Cottingley beck cuts a deep, narrow, rocky channel flowing north to the River Aire.

Although the road, railway and the Leeds and Liverpool Canal are on the opposite side of the Aire Valley to Cottingley, Parliament was asked to consider making the Aire Navigable from Cottingley to Shipley.

The village lies on Millstone Grit and there are coal deposits, some bands and seams up to 75 feet (23 m) thick. Old mine shafts litter the fields either side of Cottingley Cliffe Road shown as either Old Coal Pits or Coal pits on the 1852 map, and one is listed as Cottingley Moor Bottom as having closed in 1860.

== Amenities ==
There are two churches in the village; St Mary and St Monica is the Catholic church and the Church of St Michael and All Angels is the Anglican Church. St Michaels and All Angels was part of a regeneration project that spent £4.5 million, which included meeting rooms, a doctor's surgery, nursery and youth facilities and 50 new homes. The project started because a 1960s war memorial had been vandalised, and reports in the press caught the eye of Prince Charles, who came to speak at the grand unveiling.

The village has a primary school on Cottingley Moor Road, rated Good by OFSTED, and a secondary school, Dixons Cottingley Academy. Cottingley Town Hall, which is now grade II listed, celebrated its 150th anniversary in 2015.

== Notable residents ==
- Dominic Brunt – lived in the house of the Cottingley Fairy hoax in the early 2000s
- Elsie Wright and Frances Griffiths (Cottingley Fairies girls)
- Professor Deborah Dunn-Walters, an immunologist and Professor of Immunology who provided the government with advice during the COVID-19 pandemic.

== Other notes ==
- Cottingley Hall is shown on the 1908 map near the site of Cottingley Manor Park. On the 1852 map it is Cottingley House. (As Cottingley Hall bore the date 1659 RAF (Robert & Anne Ferrand) together with the Knights double cross, Cottingley House and Cottingley Hall are different names for the same property.)
- Cottingley also had a reservoir managed by Cottingley Water Works Co. This is shown above Manor Farm (now March Cote Lane) on the local map of 1908.

== See also ==
- Listed buildings in Bingley
