= List of highest-grossing actors =

The following are non-definitive lists of the actors with the highest career-film grosses. There are box-office gross revenue lists, which are not adjusted for inflation, as well as lists for the number of tickets sold.

== Box-office gross revenue ==
Because of the effects of inflation on cinema ticket prices, a list unadjusted for inflation gives much more weight to later actors.

=== Lead roles ===
This list only includes leading roles and lead ensemble roles, including voice acting. The list is updated as of 20 September 2026.

Rank	Actor	Worldwide total	Films	Average	Top-grossing film	Ref.
1	Tom Holland	$15,625,464,322	24	$651,061,013	Avengers: Endgame ($2,925,000,000)	
2	Zoe Saldaña	$15,470,006,200	33	$468,788,067	Avengers: Endgame ($2,925,000,000)	
3	Scarlett Johansson	$15,401,507,141	36	$427,819,643	Avengers: Endgame ($2,925,000,000)	
4	Chris Pratt	$15,158,303,567	29	$522,700,123	Avengers: Endgame ($2,925,000,000)	
5	Samuel L. Jackson	$14,613,700,731	70	$208,767,153	Avengers: Endgame ($2,925,000,000)	
6	Robert Downey Jr.	$14,315,110,840	45	$318,113,574	Avengers: Endgame ($2,925,000,000)	
7	Tom Cruise	$13,369,366,862	45	$297,097,041	Top Gun: Maverick ($1,503,247,657)	
8	Chris Hemsworth	$12,189,865,785	31	$393,221,477	Avengers: Endgame ($2,925,000,000)	
9	Vin Diesel	$12,043,063,424	28	$430,109,408	Avengers: Endgame ($2,925,000,000)	
10	Chris Evans	$11,489,026,787	29	$396,173,337	Avengers: Endgame ($2,925,000,000)	

=== All roles ===
This list includes cameos and voice acting. The number of films is from the source The Numbers and may not correspond exactly to a linked filmography. The list is updated as on 8 August 2026.

Rank	Actor	Worldwide total	Films	Average	Top-grossing film	Ref.
1	Stan Lee	$30,527,135,363	50	$610,542,707	Avengers: Endgame ($2,925,000,000)	
2	Samuel L. Jackson	$28,361,777,544	146	$194,258,750	Avengers: Endgame ($2,925,000,000)	
3	Alan Tudyk	$18,651,665,463	47	$396,843,946	Zootopia 2 ($1,870,309,291)	
4	John Ratzenberger	$18,482,324,141	54	$342,265,262	Inside Out 2 ($1,698,863,816)	
5	Frank Welker	$17,489,352,325	114	$153,415,371	Transformers: Dark of the Moon ($1,123,794,079)	
6	Chris Pratt	$16,873,556,220	42	$401,751,339	Avengers: Endgame ($2,925,000,000)	
7	Zoe Saldaña	$16,860,833,112	49	$344,098,635	Avengers: Endgame ($2,925,000,000)	
8	Dwayne Johnson	$16,724,080,150	57	$293,404,915	Zootopia 2 ($1,870,309,291)	
9	Scarlett Johansson	$16,435,483,784	57	$288,341,821	Avengers: Endgame ($2,925,000,000)	
10	Robert Downey Jr.	$16,244,881,835	68	$238,895,321	Avengers: Endgame ($2,925,000,000)	
11	Tom Holland	$16,183,000,867	28	$577,964,317	Avengers: Endgame ($2,925,000,000)	
12	Bob Bergen	$15,750,289,819	60	$262,504,830	Minions ($1,159,444,662)	
13	Idris Elba	$15,499,789,017	57	$271,926,123	Avengers: Infinity War ($2,048,359,754)	
14	Jon Favreau	$15,251,473,924	42	$363,130,332	Avengers: Endgame ($2,925,000,000)	
15	Andy Serkis	$15,201,463,826	40	$380,036,596	Star Wars: The Force Awakens ($2,068,223,624)	
16	Benedict Cumberbatch	$15,124,724,574	50	$302,494,491	Avengers: Endgame ($2,925,000,000)	
17	Warwick Davis	$14,955,100,548	24	$623,129,190	Star Wars: The Force Awakens ($2,068,223,624)	
18	Vin Diesel	$14,089,688,135	37	$380,802,382	Avengers: Endgame ($2,925,000,000)	
19	Chris Hemsworth	$14,019,660,935	34	$412,342,969	Avengers: Endgame ($2,925,000,000)	
20	Chris Evans	$13,973,624,854	45	$310,524,997	Avengers: Endgame ($2,925,000,000)	
21	Bradley Cooper	$13,758,873,775	44	$312,701,677	Avengers: Endgame ($2,925,000,000)	

== Earlier eras ==
=== Up until 2000 ===
A survey by TLA Video in 2000 estimated that the following actors had sold the most movie tickets at the box office.

Rank	Actor	Ticket sales (est.)
1	Clark Gable	1,168,300,000
2	John Wayne	1,114,000,000
3	Bing Crosby	1,077,900,000
4	James Stewart	981,900,000
5	Cary Grant	942,500,000
6	Spencer Tracy	937,200,000
7	Gary Cooper	878,600,000
8	Mickey Rooney	867,900,000
9	Harrison Ford	852,700,000
10	Gregory Peck	728,000,000

=== Up until 1966 ===
In 1966, Variety calculated a list of the highest-grossing stars using their All-Time Top Grossing Films lists based on the number of films that had earned theatrical rentals of $4 million or more in the United States and Canada by the end of 1965. As the list was based on number of films on the chart, there may have been some stars who appeared in fewer films listed but with a higher total rental. The list favors films and stars of the later eras as later films generally gross more. John Wayne topped the list. Variety noted that Crosby's last hit prior to 1965 was High Society in 1956, and at that date he would have led the list. They also noted that Gable was the undisputed king until he went into the Army in 1942 and that he was not ranked higher as many of his earlier hits did not reach their $4 million cut-off and were therefore not included in his total.

Rank	Actor	Total (US/Canada rentals)	Top-grossing film (US/Canada rentals)	Films on chart	Average
1	John Wayne	$113,422,000	How the West Was Won ($23,000,000)	17	$6,671,882
2	Charlton Heston	$110,500,000	Ben-Hur ($38,000,000)	7	$15,785,714
3	Gregory Peck	$105,075,000	How the West Was Won ($23,000,000)	14	$7,505,357
4	Frank Sinatra	$95,450,000	From Here To Eternity ($12,200,000)	17	$5,614,706
5	Elizabeth Taylor	$85,825,000	Cleopatra ($23,500,000)	10	$8,582,500
6	Richard Burton	$79,950,000	Cleopatra ($23,500,000)	7	$11,421,429
7	James Stewart	$77,700,000	How the West Was Won ($23,000,000)	9	$8,633,333
8	Bing Crosby	$68,500,000	White Christmas ($12,000,000)	11	$6,227,273
9	Clark Gable	$65,100,000	Gone with the Wind ($41,200,000)	6	$10,850,000
10	William Holden	$62,610,000	The Bridge on the River Kwai ($17,195,000)	10	$6,261,000
11	Cary Grant	$62,550,000	Operation Petticoat ($9,500,000)	11	$5,686,364
12	Shirley MacLaine	$62,150,000	Around the World in 80 Days ($22,000,000)	7	$8,878,571
13	Henry Fonda	$61,250,000	How the West Was Won ($23,000,000)	6	$10,208,333
14	Fred MacMurray	$58,300,000	The Shaggy Dog ($9,600,000)	8	$7,287,500
15	Spencer Tracy	$57,950,000	How the West Was Won ($23,000,000)	6	$9,658,333
16	Jean Simmons	$57,450,000	The Robe ($17,500,000)	7	$8,207,143
17	Jack Lemmon	$56,405,000	Irma La Douce ($11,250,000)	8	$7,050,625
18	Marlon Brando	$56,150,000	Sayonara ($10,500,000)	9	$6,238,889
19	David Niven	$54,400,000	Around the World in 80 Days ($22,000,000)	6	$9,066,667
20	Doris Day	$53,900,000	Lover Come Back ($8,500,000)	9	$5,988,889

== See also ==
- Top Ten Money Making Stars Poll
- Lists of highest-grossing films
- List of highest-grossing film directors
- List of highest-grossing film producers
- List of highest-paid film actors
- Bankable star
