= Andy Serkis filmography =

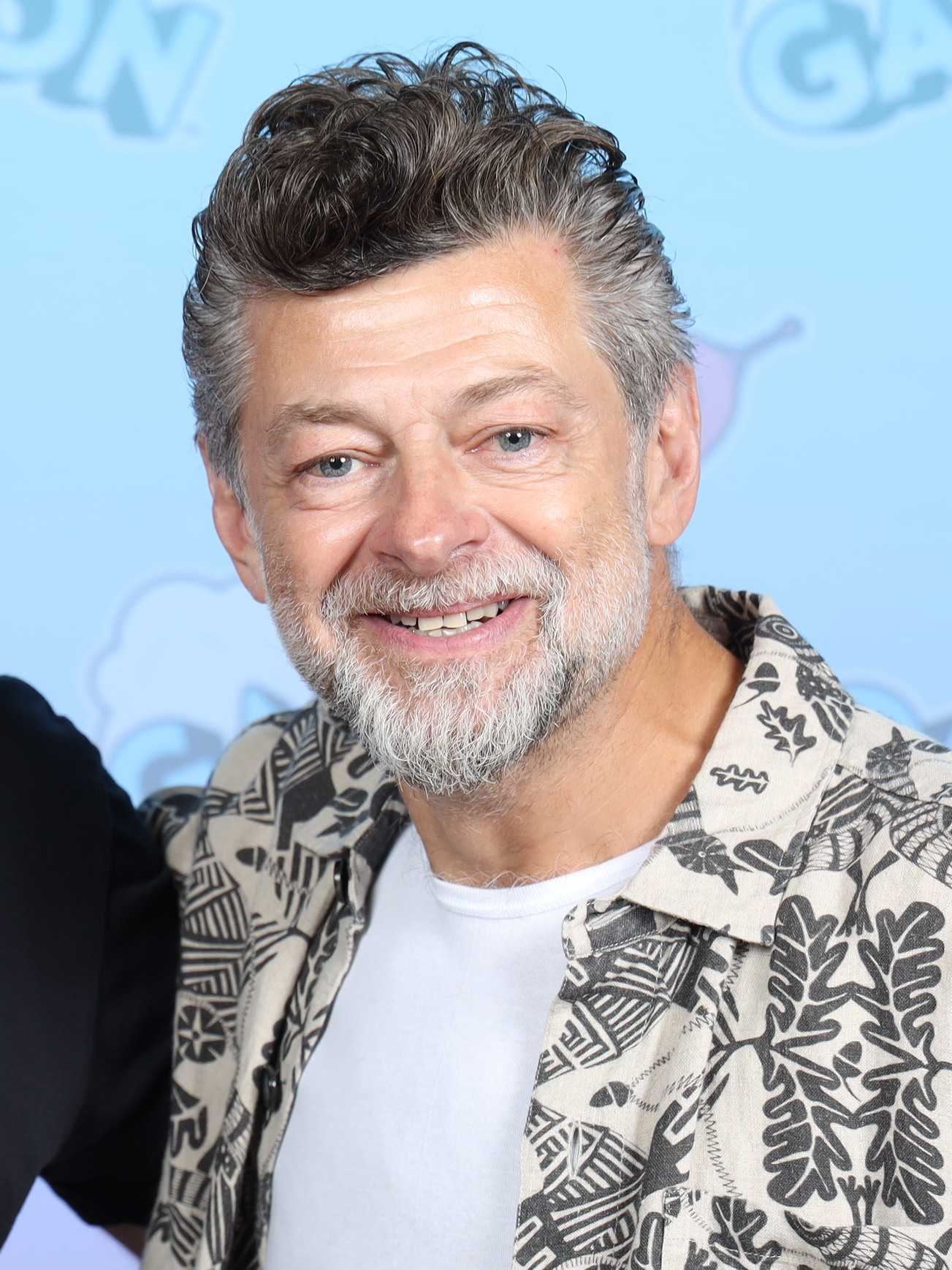
Serkis at GalaxyCon Austin in 2023

English actor Andy Serkis has been featured in various films, television series, and video games. Serkis started acting in the late 1980s with small roles on the television series Morris Minor and His Marvellous Motors (1989), and The New Statesman (1989) before being cast as Owen in Streetwise from 1989–1992. He then appeared in films such as Prince of Jutland (1994), Career Girls (1997), Pandaemonium (2000). In 2001, he was cast as the voice of Gollum in Peter Jackson's epic fantasy adventure film The Lord of the Rings: The Fellowship of the Ring. Serkis reprised this role in the sequels The Lord of the Rings: The Two Towers (2002) and The Lord of the Rings: The Return of the King (2003) as well as the 2012 prequel The Hobbit: An Unexpected Journey. During that time, he also co-starred in the films The Escapist (2002), 13 Going on 30 (2004) and lent his voice to the 2006 animated film Flushed Away.

In 2011, he provided the voice and motion capture for Caesar in the science fiction film Rise of the Planet of the Apes. He provided voice and motion capture for the role again in the 2014 sequel and the 2017 final film of the trilogy. His other voice and motion capture work includes Monkey in the 2010 video game Enslaved: Odyssey to the West, King Bohan in the 2007 video game Heavenly Sword, Kong in Peter Jackson's 2005 film King Kong, and Supreme Leader Snoke in Star Wars: The Force Awakens (2015), Star Wars: The Last Jedi (2017), and Star Wars: The Rise of Skywalker (2019).

== Film ==
Year	Title	Role	Notes	Refs.
1994	Prince of Jutland	Torsten		
1995	The Near Room	Bunny		
1996	Stella Does Tricks	Fitz		
1997	Mojo	Potts		
1997	Career Girls	Nick Evans		
1997	Loop	Bill		
1998	Sweety Barrett	Leo King		
1998	Among Giants	Bob		
1998	Clueless	David	Short film	
1998	Insomnia	Harry	Short film	
1999	Topsy-Turvy	John D'Auban		
2000	Jump	Shaun	Short film	
2000	Shiner	Mel		
2000	Pandaemonium	John Thelwall		
2000	The Jolly Boys' Last Stand	Spider		
2001	The Lord of the Rings: The Fellowship of the Ring	Gollum / Nazgûl	Voice; voice (uncredited)	
2002	The Lord of the Rings: The Two Towers	Gollum	Voice and motion capture	
2002	The Escapist	Ricky Barnes		
2002	Deathwatch	Pvt. Thomas Quinn		
2002	24 Hour Party People	Martin Hannett		
2003	Standing Room Only	Granny / Rastafarian / Hunter Jackson		
2003	The Lord of the Rings: The Return of the King	Gollum / Sméagol / Witch-king of Angmar	Voice and motion capture of Gollum; voice of Witch-king of Angmar	
2004	Blessed	Father Carlo		
2004	13 Going on 30	Richard Kneeland		
2005	King Kong	Kong / Lumpy	Motion capture of Kong	
2006	Stormbreaker	Mr. Grin		
2006	The Prestige	Mr. Alley		
2006	Flushed Away	Spike	Voice	
2007	Extraordinary Rendition	Lead Interrogator		
2007	Sugarhouse	Hoodwink		
2008	The Cottage	David		
2008	Inkheart	Capricorn		
2010	Sex & Drugs & Rock & Roll	Ian Dury		
2010	Brighton Rock	Mr. Colleoni		
2010	Animals United	Charles	Voice; English dub	
2010	Burke and Hare	William Hare		
2011	Rise of the Planet of the Apes	Caesar	Voice and motion capture	
2011	Death of a Superhero	Dr. Adrian King		
2011	Wild Bill	Glen		
2011	The Adventures of Tintin	Captain Haddock / Sir Francis Haddock	Voices and motion capture	
2011	Arthur Christmas	General Elf	Voice; cameo	
2012	The Hobbit: An Unexpected Journey	Gollum	Voice and motion capture	
2014	Dawn of the Planet of the Apes	Caesar	Voice and motion capture	
2015	Avengers: Age of Ultron	Ulysses Klaue		
2015	Star Wars: The Force Awakens	Supreme Leader Snoke	Voice and motion capture	
2017	War for the Planet of the Apes	Caesar	Voice and motion capture	
2017	Star Wars: The Last Jedi	Supreme Leader Snoke	Voice and motion capture	
2018	Black Panther	Ulysses Klaue		
2018	Mowgli: Legend of the Jungle	Baloo	Voice and motion capture	
2019	Long Shot	Parker Wembley		
2019	Star Wars: The Rise of Skywalker	Supreme Leader Snoke	Voice; cameo	
2020	A Christmas Carol	Jacob Marley's Ghost	Voice	
2021	SAS: Red Notice	George Clements		
2022	The Batman	Alfred Pennyworth		
2023	Luther: The Fallen Sun	David Robey		
2024	Hitpig!	Newscaster	Voice; cameo	
2024	Venom: The Last Dance	Knull	Voice	
2025	Animal Farm	Mr. Jones / Old Major	Voice	
2025	LouiMax Dreams of Being an Adult	Narrator	Voice	
2026	Young Washington	Edward Braddock		
2026	Pigeons	Narrator		
2027	The Lord of the Rings: The Hunt for Gollum †	Gollum	Post Production; Voice and motion capture	
2028	The Batman: Part II †	Alfred Pennyworth	Filming	

=== Director ===
- Breathe (2017)
- Mowgli: Legend of the Jungle (2018)
- Venom: Let There Be Carnage (2021)
- Animal Farm (2025) (Also producer)
- The Lord of the Rings: The Hunt for Gollum (2027)

=== Executive producer ===
- Sex & Drugs & Rock & Roll (2010)
- The Ritual (2017)
- No One Gets Out Alive (2021)
- Next Goal Wins (2023)

=== Second unit director ===
- The Hobbit: An Unexpected Journey (2012)
- The Hobbit: The Desolation of Smaug (2013)
- The Hobbit: The Battle of the Five Armies (2014)

=== Motion capture consultant ===
- Godzilla (2014)
- Avengers: Age of Ultron (2015)

== Television ==
Year	Title	Role	Notes	Refs.
1989	Morris Minor and His Marvellous Motors	Sparky Plugg	3 episodes	
1989	The New Statesman	Peter Moran	2 episodes	
1989	Saracen	Dudin	Episode: "Into Africa"	
1989	Made in Spain	Hooligan	Television film	
1989–1992	Streetwise	Owen	25 episodes	
1990, 1993	The Bill	Dean Platt / Alex Rackin	2 episodes	
1992	The Darling Buds of May	Greville	Episode: "Le Grand Weekend"	
1994	Grushko	Pyotr	3 episodes	
1994	Pie in the Sky	Maxwell	Episode: "Passion Fruit Fool"	
1994	Finney	Tom	6 episodes	
1994	The Chief	Jacko Dolan	Episode: "Hammer and Tongs"	
1996	Kavanagh QC	MEM O'Brien	Episode: "The Burning Deck"	
1997	The Pale Horse	Sergeant Corrigan	Television film	
1998	The Jump	Steven Brunos	3 episodes	
1999	Oliver Twist	Bill Sikes	3 episodes	
1999	Shooting the Past	Styeman	3 episodes	
1999	Touching Evil	Michael Lawler	2 episodes	
2000	Arabian Nights	Kasim	2 episodes	
2003, 2024	The Simpsons	Cleanie / Illustrated Man	Voices; episodes: "Dude, Where's My Ranch?" and "Treehouse of Horror Presents: Simpsons Wicked This Way Comes"	
2004	Spooks	Riff	Episode: "Celebrity"	
2006	Simon Schama's Power of Art	Vincent van Gogh	Episode: "Van Gogh: Wheat Field with Crows"	
2006	Longford	Ian Brady	Television film	
2007	Monkey Life	Narrator	Documentary; 14 episodes	
2008	Little Dorrit	Rigaud	11 episodes	
2008	Einstein and Eddington	Albert Einstein	Television film	
2010	Accused	Liam Black	Episode: "Liam's Story"	
2012	The Dark: Nature's Nighttime World	Narrator	Documentary; 3 episodes	
2015	Fungus the Bogeyman	Narrator	Miniseries; 3 episodes	
2018	Neanderthals: Meet Your Ancestors	Ned	Documentary; 2 episodes	
2019	A Christmas Carol	Ghost of Christmas Past	Miniseries; 3 episodes	
2020	The Letter for the King	Mayor of Mistrinaut	6 episodes	
2020	Home Movie: The Princess Bride	Count Rugen	Episode: "Chapter Seven: The Pit of Despair"	
2020	Hilda	Kertasníkir	Voice; episode: "The Yule Lads"	
2020	Once Upon a Time in Iraq	Narrator	Documentary; 5 episodes	
2021	What If...?	Ulysses Klaue	Voice; episode: "What If... Killmonger Rescued Tony Stark?"	
2022	Animal	Narrator	Documentary; 1 episode	
2022	Andor	Kino Loy	3 episodes	
2022	The Bastard Son & The Devil Himself	—N/a	Executive producer only; 8 episodes	
2024–2026	Brilliant Minds	—N/a	Executive producer only	
2026–present	The Legend of Vox Machina	Gideon / The Whispered One	Voice, 4 episodes	
2026–present	Rick and Morty	Cat and Mouse Killer	Voice, "Rickuiem Mort a Dream"	

== Video games ==
Year	Title	Voice role	Notes	Refs.
2002	The Lord of the Rings: The Two Towers	Gollum	Archive voice	
2003	The Lord of the Rings: The Return of the King	Gollum / Witch-king of Angmar		
2004	The Lord of the Rings: The Battle for Middle-earth	Smeagol / Gollum / Witch-king of Angmar		
2005	King Kong: The Official Game of the Movie	Lumpy		
2006	The Lord of the Rings: The Battle for Middle-earth II - The Rise of the Witch-king	Witch-king of Angmar / Gollum		
2007	Heavenly Sword	King Bohan	Also motion capture and dramatic director	
2009	Risen	The Inquisitor Mendoza		
2010	Enslaved: Odyssey to the West	Monkey / Pyramid	Also motion capture	
2012	Lego The Lord of the Rings	Gollum	Archive voice	
2014	Lego The Hobbit	Gollum	Archive voice	
2015	Volume	Guy Gisborne		
2016	Lego Star Wars: The Force Awakens	Supreme Leader Snoke	Archive voice; uncredited	
2022	Warhammer 40,000: Chaos Gate - Daemonhunters	Grand Master Vardan Kai		
2025	Clair Obscur: Expedition 33	Renoir		
2027	Squadron 42	Thul	Also motion capture	

== Stage ==
Year	Title	Role	Notes	Refs.
1995	Mojo	Potts	Royal Court	
1997	The Rover	Willmore	BBC Open University Productions	
2023–2024	Ulster American	Leigh	Riverside Studios	

== Audiobooks ==
Year	Title	Role	Notes	Refs.
2008	The Brightonomicon	Count Otto Black		
2009	The Screwtape Letters	Screwtape		
2014	The Child	Engler		
2019	The Beast of Buckingham Palace	Lord Protector		
2020	The Sandman	Matthew the Raven		
2020	The Hobbit	Narrator / Performer		
2021	The Lord of the Rings	Narrator / Performer		
2021	The Sandman: Act II	Matthew the Raven		
2022	Small Gods	Narrator		
2023	The Silmarillion	Narrator / Performer		

== See also ==
- List of awards and nominations received by Andy Serkis
