= List of highest-grossing film directors =

The following is a non-definitive list of the film directors with the highest career film grosses as of November 2026. The list is not adjusted for inflation.

== Worldwide ==
Background shading indicates directors whose films are currently playing in theaters.

Highest-grossing directors worldwide
Rank	Name	Worldwide box office	Highest-grossing film
1	Steven Spielberg	$11,006,093,106	$1,037,535,230 (Jurassic Park)
2	James Cameron	$10,591,396,628	$2,923,710,708 (Avatar)
3	Christopher Nolan	$8,047,745,858	$1,801,737,440 (The Odyssey)
4	Anthony Russo, Joe Russo	$6,905,897,779	$2,942,318,540 (Avengers: Endgame)
5	Peter Jackson	$6,553,022,508	$1,147,997,407 (The Lord of the Rings: The Return of the King)
6	Michael Bay	$6,495,849,210	$1,123,794,079 (Transformers: Dark of the Moon)
7	David Yates	$6,354,627,148	$1,342,139,727 (Harry Potter and the Deathly Hallows – Part 2)
8	Ridley Scott	$5,044,794,385	$630,161,890 (The Martian)
9	Tim Burton	$4,940,106,509	$1,025,491,110 (Alice in Wonderland)
10	Andrew Stanton	$4,772,691,895	$1,146,101,548 (Toy Story 5)
11	J. J. Abrams	$4,637,580,337	$2,068,223,624 (Star Wars: The Force Awakens)
12	Robert Zemeckis	$4,396,123,401	$678,226,465 (Forrest Gump)
13	Ron Howard	$4,352,178,743	$801,349,858 (The Da Vinci Code)
14	Jon Favreau	$4,336,018,074	$1,656,943,394 (The Lion King)
15	Sam Raimi	$4,266,568,715	$955,755,804 (Doctor Strange in the Multiverse of Madness)
16	Chris Renaud	$4,176,449,267	$972,964,428 (Despicable Me 4)
17	James Wan	$4,174,708,796	$1,515,342,457 (Furious 7)
18	Chris Columbus	$4,092,285,485	$1,029,374,615 (Harry Potter and the Philosopher's Stone)
19	Shawn Levy	$4,050,867,277	$1,338,071,348 (Deadpool & Wolverine)
20	Roland Emmerich	$4,015,708,066	$817,400,891 (Independence Day)
21	Jon Watts	$3,934,883,628	$1,921,847,111 (Spider-Man: No Way Home)
22	Byron Howard	$3,874,928,691	$1,870,309,291 (Zootopia 2)
23	Francis Lawrence	$3,758,130,588	$865,011,746 (The Hunger Games: Catching Fire)
24	Pierre Coffin	$3,710,005,544	$1,159,457,503 (Minions)
25	Bryan Singer	$3,708,723,733	$910,813,521 (Bohemian Rhapsody)
26	Gore Verbinski	$3,679,473,328	$1,066,179,747 (Pirates of the Caribbean: Dead Man's Chest)
27	George Lucas	$3,522,061,896	$1,046,515,409 (Star Wars: Episode I – The Phantom Menace)
28	Brad Bird	$3,433,846,498	$1,242,805,359 (Incredibles 2)
29	Todd Phillips	$3,393,161,492	$1,078,958,629 (Joker)
30	Clint Eastwood	$3,370,612,544	$547,659,020 (American Sniper)
31	James Gunn	$3,323,256,386	$869,087,963 (Guardians of the Galaxy Vol. 2)
32	M. Night Shyamalan	$3,246,538,712	$672,806,292 (The Sixth Sense)
33	Zack Snyder	$3,177,750,173	$874,360,194 (Batman v Superman: Dawn of Justice)
34	Kyle Balda	$3,127,787,910	$1,159,457,503 (Minions)
35	Carlos Saldanha	$3,113,638,013	$886,686,817 (Ice Age: Dawn of the Dinosaurs)
36	Sam Mendes	$3,112,775,307	$1,108,561,013 (Skyfall)
37	Chris Buck	$3,104,257,376	$1,450,026,933 (Frozen 2)
38	Bill Condon	$3,038,602,782	$1,263,521,126 (Beauty and the Beast)
39	Destin Daniel Cretton	$3,028,796,533	$2,521,214,671 (Spider-Man: Brand New Day)
40	Justin Lin	$3,012,761,684	$788,679,850 (Fast & Furious 6)
41	Joss Whedon	$2,955,065,480	$1,518,812,988 (The Avengers)
42	Tom McGrath	$2,899,949,644	$746,921,274 (Madagascar 3: Europe's Most Wanted)
43	Christopher McQuarrie	$2,863,278,525	$791,115,104 (Mission: Impossible – Fallout)
44	Joseph Kosinski	$2,805,407,970	$1,503,260,455 (Top Gun: Maverick)
45	Guy Ritchie	$2,776,314,651	$1,050,693,953 (Aladdin)
46	Ryan Coogler	$2,754,272,776	$1,347,597,973 (Black Panther)
47	Jennifer Lee	$2,740,026,933	$1,450,026,933 (Frozen 2)
48	Jon M. Chu	$2,722,128,393	$758,729,195 (Wicked)
49	Rob Marshall	$2,698,628,525	$1,045,713,802 (Pirates of the Caribbean: On Stranger Tides)
50	Colin Trevorrow	$2,684,288,396	$1,671,537,444 (Jurassic World)

== See also ==
- List of highest-grossing actors
- List of highest-grossing film producers
  - List of highest-grossing films
  - List of highest-grossing films in the United States and Canada
