= List of highest-grossing film producers =

The following is a non-definitive list of the all-time highest-grossing film producers. The list is not adjusted for inflation.

== Worldwide ==
Background shading indicates producers whose films are currently playing in theaters.

Highest-grossing producers worldwide
Rank	Name	Highest-grossing film	Total worldwide box office
1	Kevin Feige	Avengers: Endgame ($2.798 billion)	$50.125 billion
2	Avi Arad	Spider-Man: Brand New Day ($2.451 billion)	$26.055 billion
3	David Heyman	Barbie ($1.446 billion)	$14.626 billion
4	Kathleen Kennedy	Star Wars: The Force Awakens ($2.068 billion)	$13.667 billion
5	Neal H. Moritz	Furious 7 ($1.518 billion)	$13.405 billion
6	Jerry Bruckheimer	Top Gun: Maverick ($1.489 billion)	$13.375 billion
7	Frank Marshall	Jurassic World ($1.672 billion)	$11.057 billion
8	Chris Meledandri	The Super Mario Bros. Movie ($1.362 billion)	$10.438 billion
9	Charles Roven	The Dark Knight Rises ($1.084 billion)	$9.791 billion
10	James Cameron	Avatar ($2.923 billion)	$9.054 billion

== See also ==
- Lists of highest-grossing films
- List of highest-grossing film directors
- List of highest-grossing actors
