= List of highest-paid film actors =

While the highest-paid film actors can command multi-million-dollar salaries, actors can potentially earn substantially more by deferring all or part of their salary against a percentage of the film's gross, known within the industry as a "profit participation" deal.

== Highest earnings for a single production ==
Since not all salaries are made public, this is a non-definitive list of actors who have received $30 million or more as compensation for their services in a single production. Occasionally an actor's fee may cover multiple films, and they are included on the list if the films were filmed as a back-to-back production (for example, Keanu Reeves and the Matrix sequels). The figures are given at their nominal value, since earnings from profit-based deals are accumulated over many years, making it unfeasible to adjust for inflation.

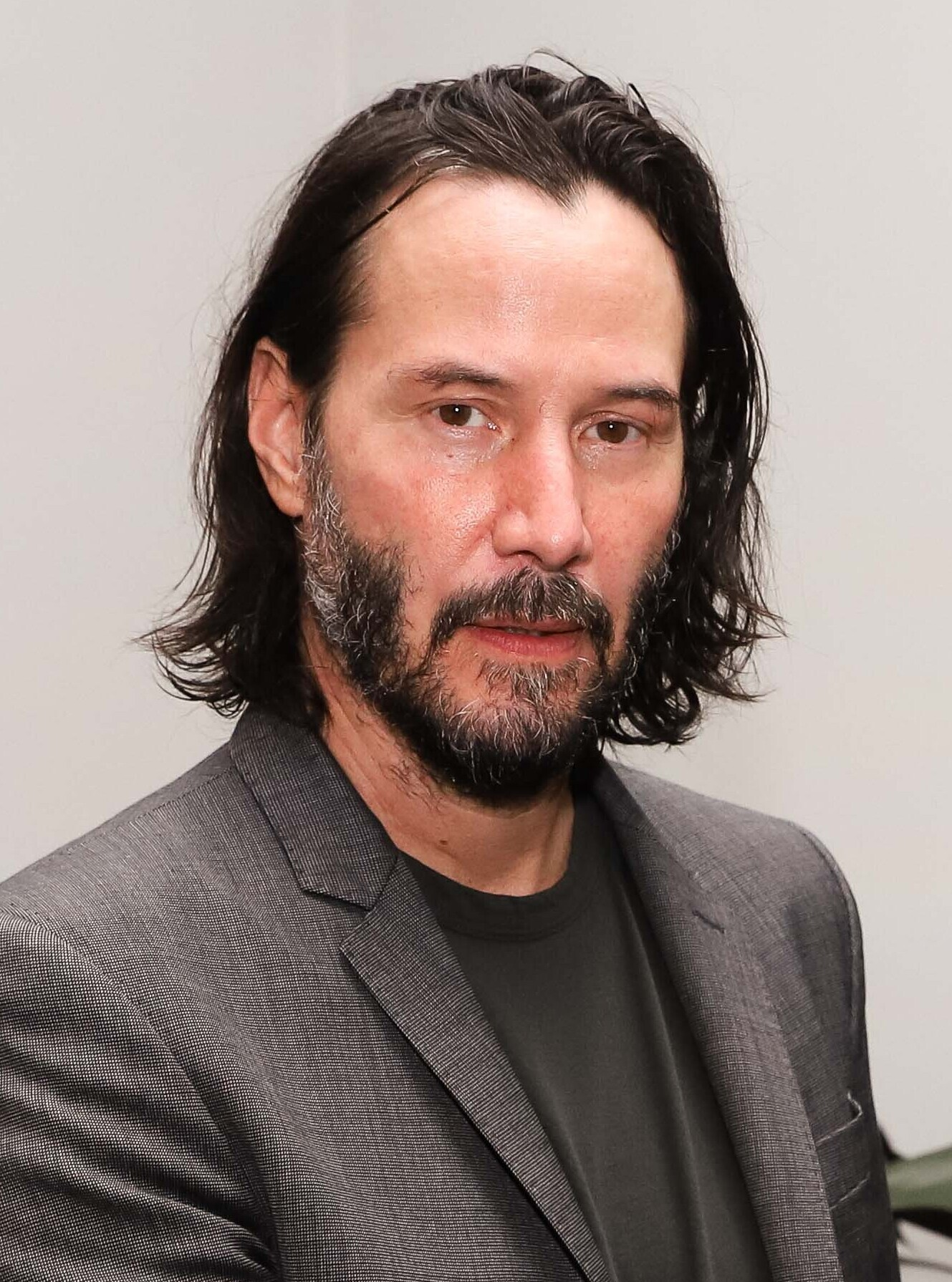
Keanu Reeves earned a record $156 million for the first two Matrix sequels, filmed back-to-back.

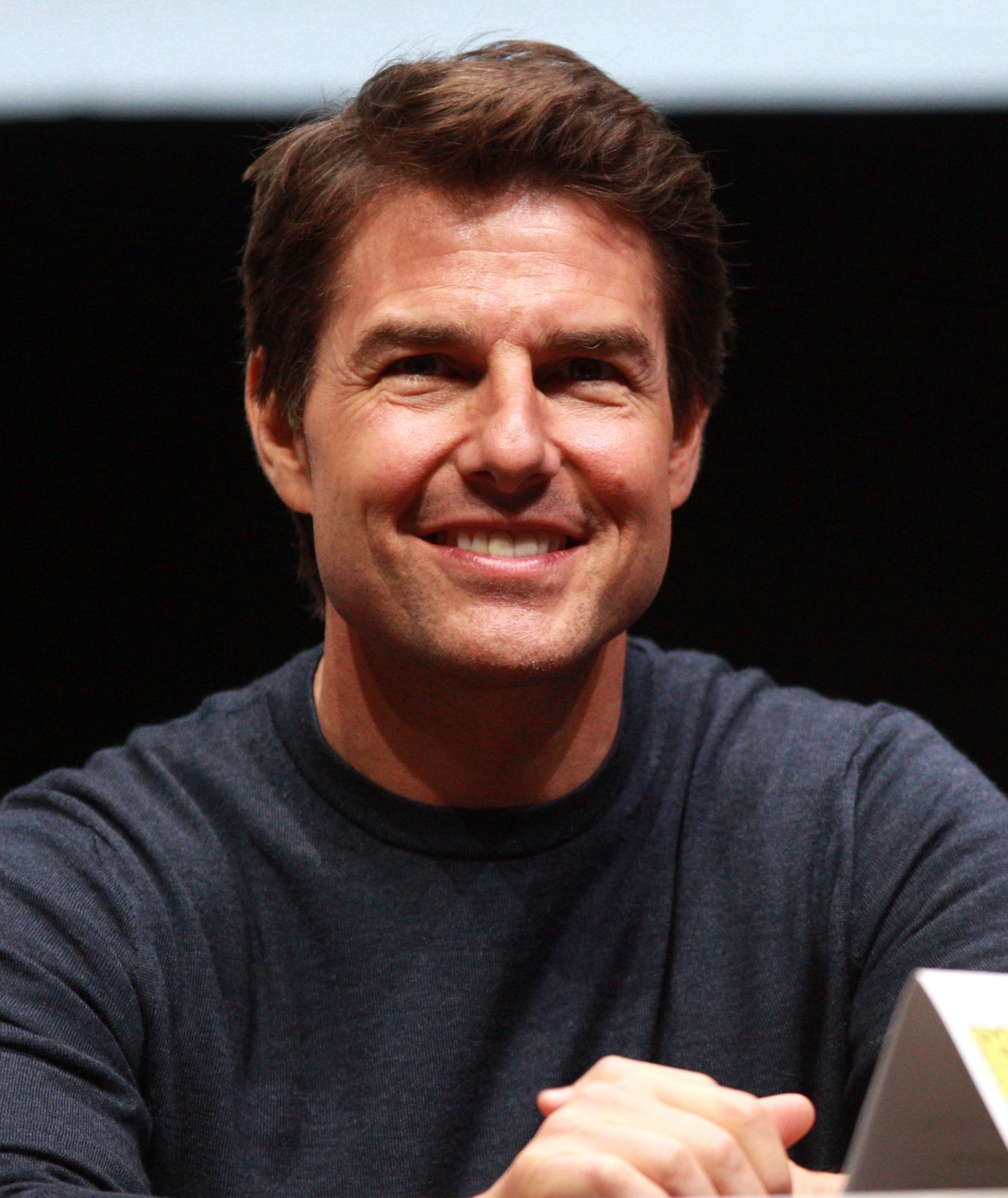
Tom Cruise has earned in excess of $100 million per film on three occasions.

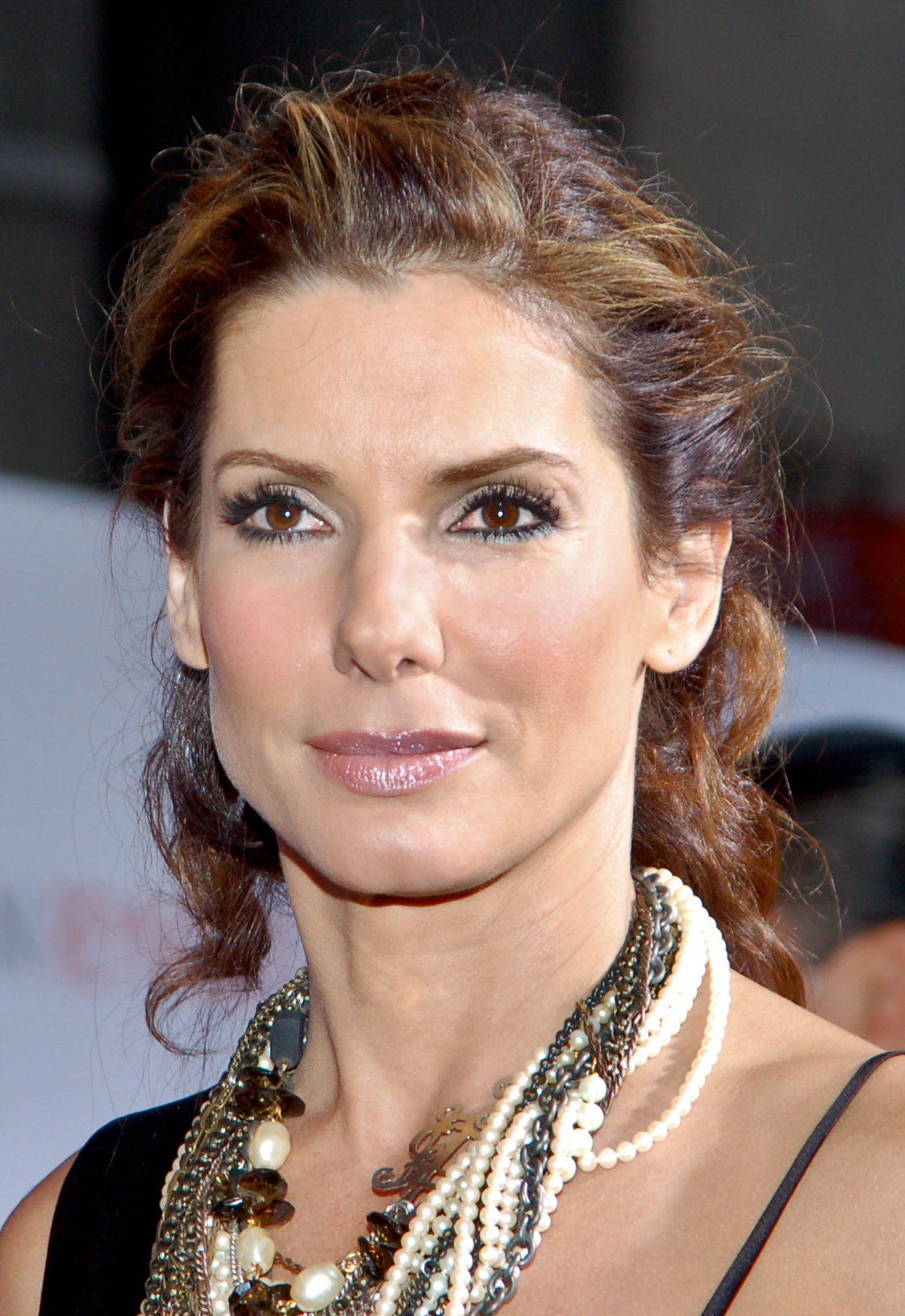
Sandra Bullock is the highest-paid actress, earning over $70 million for Gravity.

Highest-earning actors for a single production
Actor	Film	Year	Salary	Total income	Ref.
Keanu Reeves	The Matrix Reloaded; The Matrix Revolutions	2003	$30,000,000	$156,000,000	
Bruce Willis	The Sixth Sense	1999	$14,000,000	$100,000,000	
Tom Cruise	Mission: Impossible 2	2000		$100,000,000	
Tom Cruise	War of the Worlds	2005		$100,000,000	
Will Smith	Men in Black 3	2012	$20,000,000	$100,000,000	
Tom Cruise	Top Gun: Maverick	2022	$12,500,000	$100,000,000	
Tom Holland	Spider-Man: Brand New Day	2026	$20,000,000	$100,000,000	
Alec Guinness	Star Wars	1977	$150,000	$95,000,000	
Robert Downey Jr.	Avengers: Infinity War	2018		$75,000,000+	
Robert Downey Jr.	Iron Man 3	2013		$75,000,000	
Robert Downey Jr.	Avengers: Endgame	2019	$20,000,000	$75,000,000	
Sandra Bullock	Gravity	2013	$20,000,000	$70,000,000+	
Tom Hanks	Forrest Gump	1994	$7,000,000	$70,000,000	
Tom Cruise	Mission: Impossible	1996	$25,000,000	$70,000,000	
Harrison Ford	Indiana Jones and the Kingdom of the Crystal Skull	2008		$65,000,000	
Johnny Depp	Pirates of the Caribbean: Dead Man's Chest	2006		$60,000,000	
Jack Nicholson	Batman	1989	$6,000,000	$60,000,000	
Leonardo DiCaprio	Inception	2010		$59,000,000	
Johnny Depp	Alice in Wonderland	2010		$55,000,000	
Johnny Depp	Pirates of the Caribbean: On Stranger Tides	2011	$35,000,000	$55,000,000	
Jackie Chan	Rush Hour 3	2007	$15,000,000	$53,700,000	
Johnny Depp	Pirates of the Caribbean: At World's End	2007		$50,000,000	
Robert Downey Jr.	The Avengers	2012		$50,000,000	
Margot Robbie	Barbie	2023	$12,500,000	$50,000,000	
Cameron Diaz	Bad Teacher	2011	$1,000,000	$42,000,000	
Robert Downey Jr.	Captain America: Civil War	2016	$40,000,000	$40,000,000+	
Arnold Schwarzenegger	Twins	1988	$0	$40,000,000+	
Leonardo DiCaprio	Titanic	1997		$40,000,000	
Tom Hanks	Saving Private Ryan	1998		$40,000,000	
Robert Downey Jr.	Avengers: Age of Ultron	2015		$40,000,000	
Will Smith	King Richard	2021	$40,000,000	$40,000,000	
Denzel Washington	The Little Things	2021		$40,000,000	
Aamir Khan	Dangal	2016		$39,000,000	(Note: ₹2.57 billion ($39.4 million at 2017 exchange rates).)
Allu Arjun	Pushpa 2: The Rule	2024		$36,000,000	(Note: ₹3 billion ($35.9 million at 2024 exchange rates).)
Jim Carrey	Yes Man	2008		$35,000,000	
Will Smith	Emancipation	2022	$35,000,000	$35,000,000	
Arnold Schwarzenegger	Terminator 3: Rise of the Machines	2003	$29,250,000	$30,000,000+	(Note: Arnold Schwarzenegger received a $29,250,000 salary for Terminator 3 plus a 20% royalty on the worldwide box office gross over $380 million. The film ultimately had a global gross of $433 million.)
Mel Gibson	Lethal Weapon 4	1998	$30,000,000	$30,000,000	
Brad Pitt	Ocean's Eleven	2001	$10,000,000	$30,000,000	
Johnny Depp	Pirates of the Caribbean: Dead Men Tell No Tales	2017	$30,000,000	$30,000,000	
Leonardo DiCaprio	Don't Look Up	2021	$30,000,000	$30,000,000	
Leonardo DiCaprio	Killers of the Flower Moon	2023	$30,000,000	$30,000,000	
Brad Pitt	F1	2025	$30,000,000	$30,000,000	

== Highest annual earnings ==
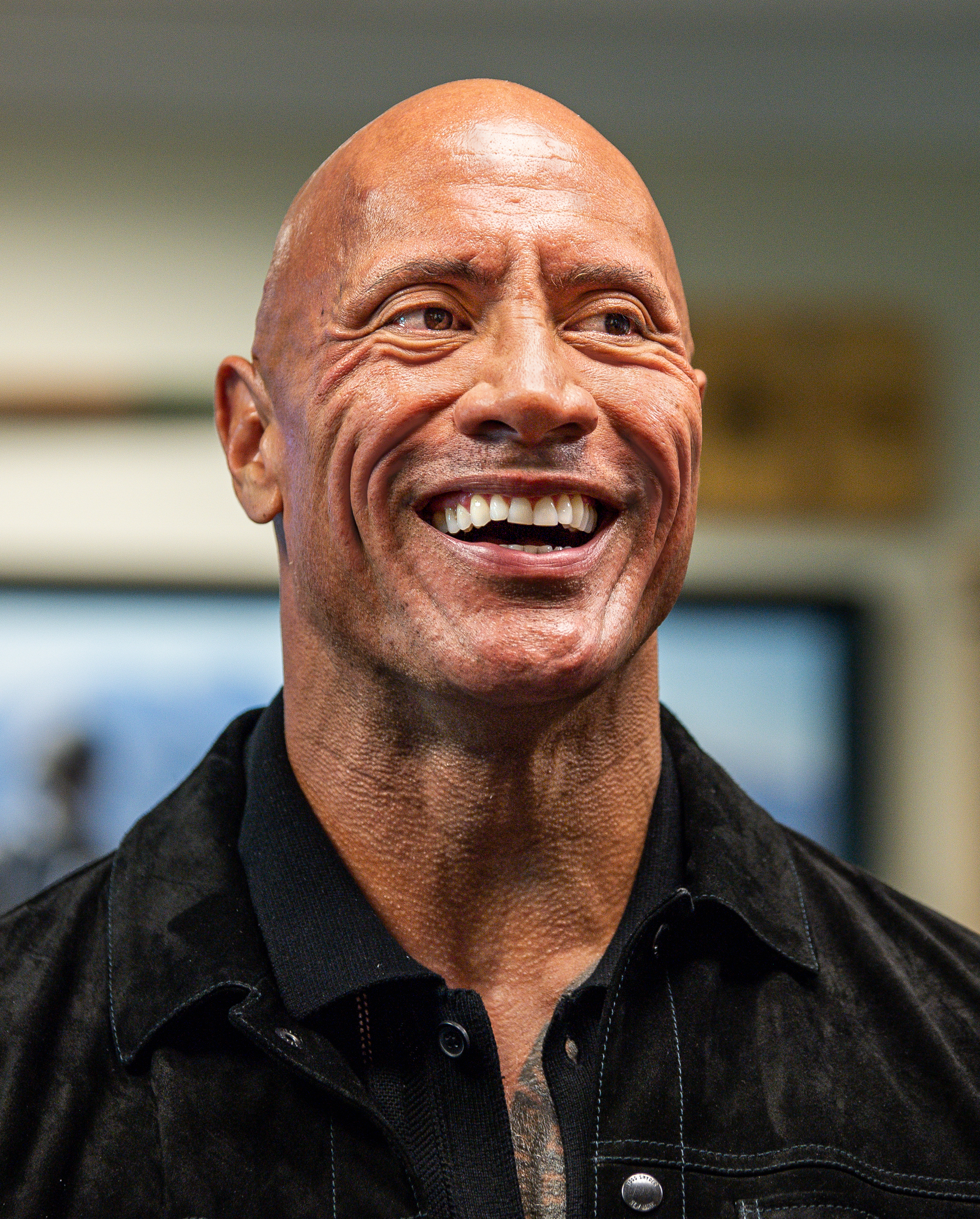
Dwayne Johnson was the highest-paid actor in 2016, 2019, 2020, 2021, and 2024.

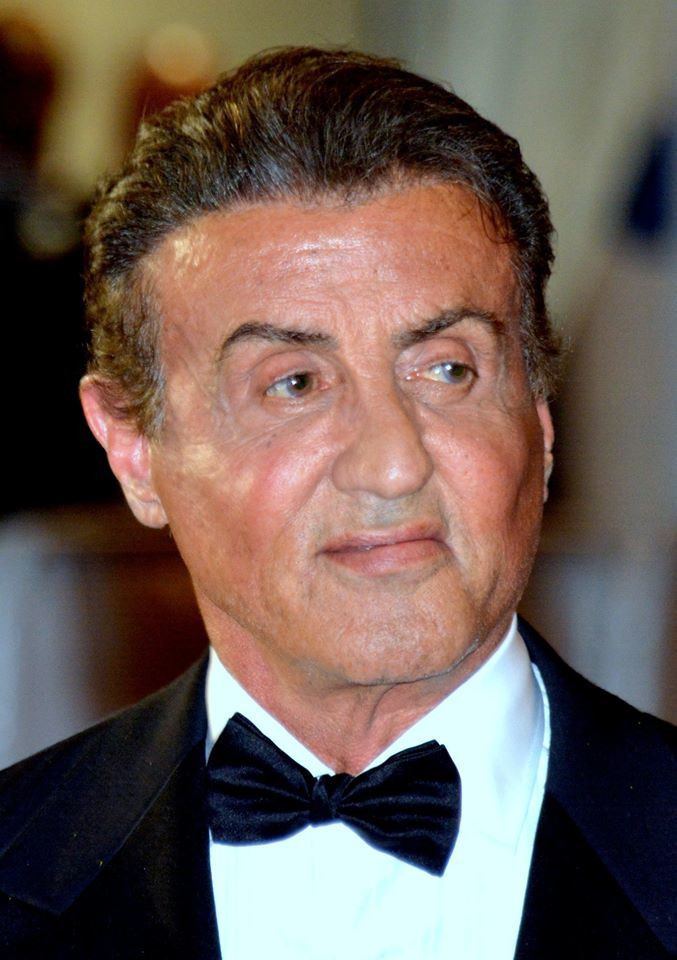
Sylvester Stallone was the highest-paid actor in 1987, 1988, 1990, and 1995.

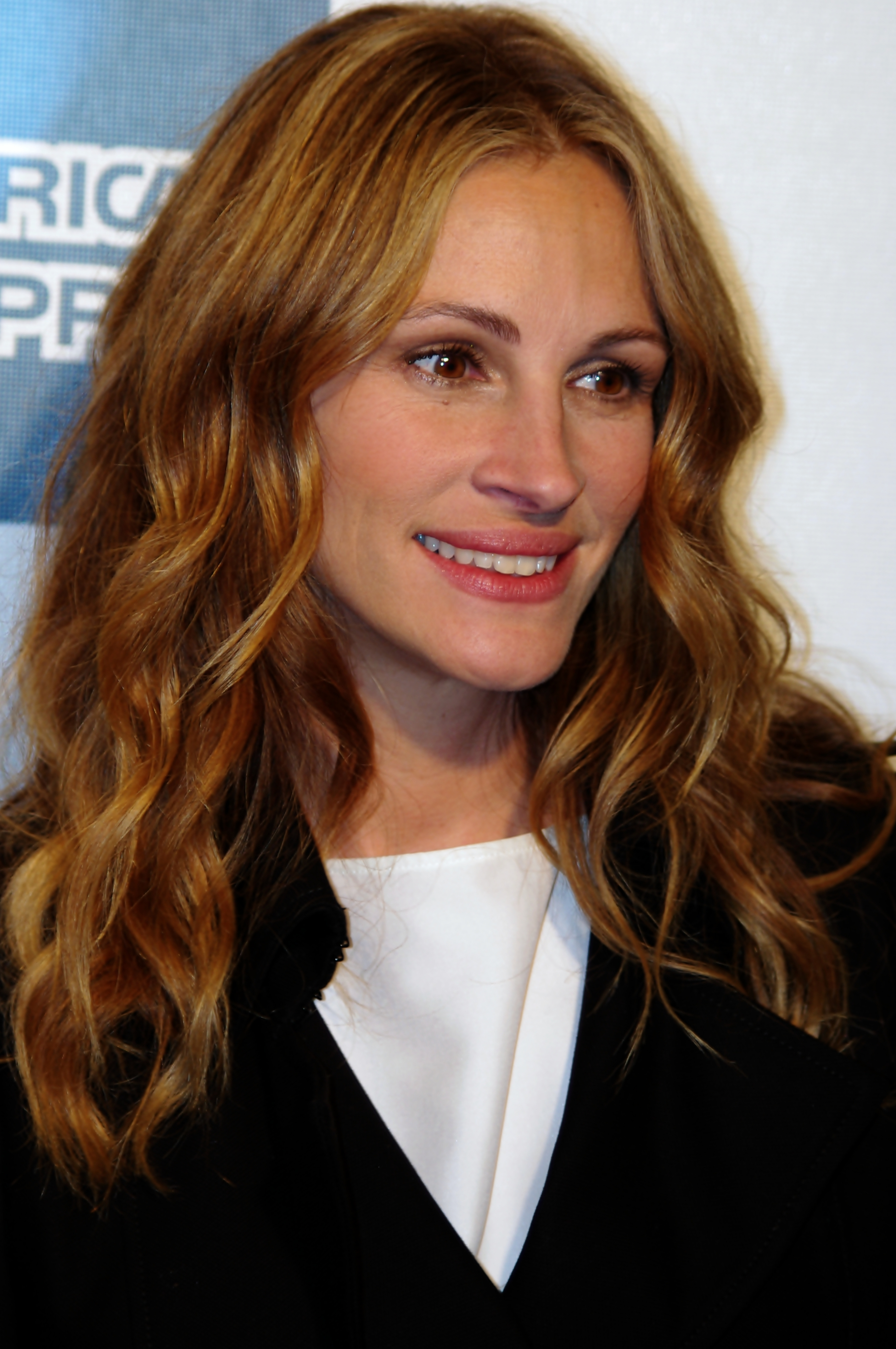
Julia Roberts was the highest-paid actress in 1998, 1999, and 2000.

Forbes publishes yearly lists of the highest-paid actors and actresses based on total earnings from 1 June the previous year to 1 June the current year, and the highest-earning actor and actress for each year as determined by Forbes are tabulated here. The earnings only cover a one-year period, and in some instances are derived from other revenue streams besides acting work.

Annual highest-paid actor and actress
Year	Actor	Earnings (gross)	Actress	Earnings (gross)	Ref.
1987	Sylvester Stallone	$74 million	Jane Fonda	$13 million	
1988	Sylvester Stallone	$63 million	—N/a	—N/a	
1989	Eddie Murphy	$60 million	—N/a	—N/a	
1990	Sylvester Stallone	$63 million	—N/a	—N/a	
1991	Kevin Costner	$59 million	—N/a	—N/a	
1992	Kevin Costner	$71 million	—N/a	—N/a	
1993	Kevin Costner	$48 million	—N/a	—N/a	
1994	Harrison Ford	$44 million	—N/a	—N/a	
1995	Sylvester Stallone	$58 million	Roseanne Barr	$32 million	
1996	Arnold Schwarzenegger	$74 million	Roseanne Barr	$40 million	
1997	Tom Cruise	$82 million	Roseanne Barr	$55 million	
1998	Harrison Ford	$58 million	Julia Roberts	$28 million	
1999	Tom Hanks	$71.5 million	Julia Roberts	$50 million	
2000	Bruce Willis	$70 million	Julia Roberts	$18.9 million	
2001	Unpublished				
2002	Adam Sandler	$47 million	Cameron Diaz	$40 million	
2003	Will Smith	$60 million	Jennifer Aniston	$35 million	
2004	Jim Carrey	$66 million	Cameron Diaz	$32 million	
2005	Will Ferrell	$40 million	Drew Barrymore	$22 million	
2006	Tom Cruise	$67 million	Jodie Foster	$27 million	
2007	Johnny Depp	$92 million	Nicole Kidman	$28 million	
2008	Johnny Depp	$72 million	Cameron Diaz	$50 million	
2009	Harrison Ford	$65 million	Angelina Jolie	$27 million	
2010	Johnny Depp	$75 million	Sandra Bullock	$56 million	
2011	Leonardo DiCaprio	$77 million	Angelina Jolie	$30 million	
2012	Tom Cruise	$75 million	Kristen Stewart	$34.5 million	
2013	Robert Downey Jr.	$75 million	Angelina Jolie	$33 million	
2014	Robert Downey Jr.	$75 million	Sandra Bullock	$51 million	
2015	Robert Downey Jr.	$80 million	Jennifer Lawrence	$52 million	
2016	Dwayne Johnson	$64.5 million	Jennifer Lawrence	$46 million	
2017	Mark Wahlberg	$68 million	Emma Stone	$26 million	
2018	George Clooney	$239 million (Note: George Clooney's 2018 earnings are mainly from the June 2017 sale of Casamigos tequila.)	Scarlett Johansson	$40.5 million	
2019	Dwayne Johnson	$89.4 million	Scarlett Johansson	$56 million	
2020	Dwayne Johnson	$87.5 million	Sofía Vergara	$43 million	
2021	Dwayne Johnson	$270 million	Reese Witherspoon	$115 million	
2022	Tyler Perry	$175 million	—N/a	—N/a	
2023	Adam Sandler	$97 million	Margot Robbie	$78 million	
2024	Dwayne Johnson	$103 million	Nicole Kidman	$41 million	
2025	Adam Sandler	$60 million	Scarlett Johansson	$50 million	

== See also ==
- List of highest-grossing actors
