= List of awards and nominations received by Andy Serkis =

Andy Serkis awards and nominations
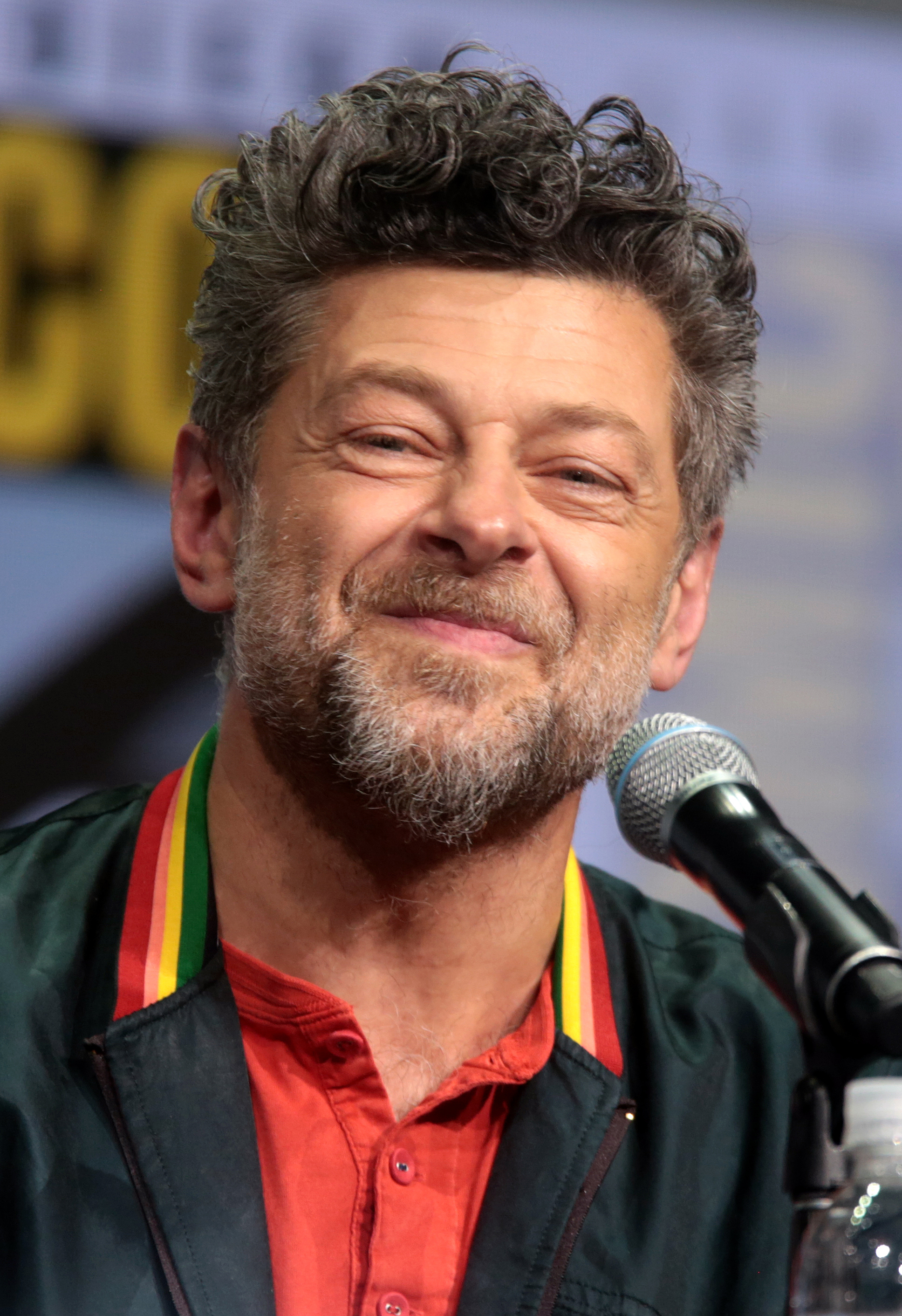
- Serkis at the 2017 San Diego Comic-Con
Award	Wins	Nominations
BAFTA Awards	1	2
Empire Awards	2	5
Screen Actors Guild Awards	2	4
Emmy Awards	1	2

The following is the list of awards and nominations received by English actor Andy Serkis. For his role as Gollum in The Lord of the Rings film series, he won the Empire Award for Best British Actor, Saturn Award for Best Supporting Actor, and Screen Actors Guild Award for Outstanding Performance by a Cast in a Motion Picture, sharing the latter with the cast.

== AACTA Awards ==
Year	Nominated work	Category	Result
2014	Dawn of the Planet of the Apes	Best Supporting Actor	Nominated

== British Academy Film Awards ==
Year	Nominated work	Category	Result
2009	Sex & Drugs & Rock & Roll	Best Actor in a Leading Role	Nominated
2020	—N/a	Outstanding British Contribution to Cinema	Won

== British Academy Television Awards ==
Year	Nominated work	Category	Result
2006	Longford	Best Actor	Nominated

== British Independent Film Awards ==
Year	Nominated work	Category	Result
2009	Sex & Drugs & Rock & Roll	Best Performance by an Actor in a British Independent Film	Nominated

== Empire Awards ==
Year	Nominated work	Category	Result
2003	The Lord of the Rings: The Two Towers	Best British Actor	Nominated
2004	The Lord of the Rings: The Return of the King	Best British Actor	Won
2010	Sex & Drugs & Rock & Roll	Inspiration Award	Won
2012	Rise of the Planet of the Apes	Best Actor	Nominated
2015	Dawn of the Planet of the Apes	Best Actor	Won
2017	War for the Planet of the Apes	Best Actor	Nominated

== Golden Globe Awards ==
Year	Nominated work	Category	Result
2006	Longford	Best Supporting Actor – Series, Miniseries or Television Film	Nominated

== MTV Movie & TV Awards ==
Year	Nominated work	Category	Result
2003	The Lord of the Rings: The Two Towers	Best On-Screen Duo (shared with Sean Astin and Elijah Wood)	Won
Best Virtual Performance	The Lord of the Rings: The Two Towers	Won	
2006	King Kong	Best Fight	Nominated
2016	Star Wars: The Force Awakens	Best Virtual Performance	Nominated

== Primetime Emmy Awards ==
Year	Nominated work	Category	Result
2009	Little Dorrit	Outstanding Supporting Actor in a Miniseries or Movie	Nominated

== Daytime Emmy Awards ==
Year	Nominated work	Category	Result
2021	The Letter for the King	Outstanding Guest Performer in a Daytime Fiction Program	Won

== Satellite Awards ==
Year	Nominated work	Category	Result
2006	Longford	Best Supporting Actor – Series, Miniseries or Television Film	Nominated
2011	Rise of the Planet of the Apes	Best Supporting Actor – Motion Picture	Nominated
2014	Dawn of the Planet of the Apes	Best Supporting Actor – Motion Picture	Nominated

== Screen Actors Guild Awards ==
Year	Nominated work	Category	Result	Ref.
2004	The Lord of the Rings: The Return of the King	Outstanding Performance by a Cast in a Motion Picture	Won	
2019	Black Panther	Outstanding Performance by a Cast in a Motion Picture	Won	

== Saturn Awards ==
Year	Nominated work	Category	Result
2002	The Lord of the Rings: The Two Towers	Best Supporting Actor	Won
2003	The Lord of the Rings: The Return of the King	Best Supporting Actor	Nominated
2011	Rise of the Planet of the Apes	Best Supporting Actor	Won
2014	Dawn of the Planet of the Apes	Best Supporting Actor	Nominated
2017	War for the Planet of the Apes	Best Actor	Nominated

== Film critic awards ==
Year	Nominated work	Category	Result
2002	The Lord of the Rings: The Two Towers	Critics' Choice Movie Award for Best Digital Acting Performance	Won
2002	The Lord of the Rings: The Two Towers	Online Film Critics Society Award for Best Cast	Won
2002	The Lord of the Rings: The Two Towers	Online Film Critics Society Award for Best Supporting Actor	Nominated
2003	The Lord of the Rings: The Return of the King	Chicago Film Critics Association Award for Best Supporting Actor	Nominated
2003	The Lord of the Rings: The Return of the King	Online Film Critics Society Award for Best Supporting Actor	Nominated
2005	King Kong	Toronto Film Critics Association Award for Special Citation; For his unprecedented work helping to realize the main character in King Kong	Won
2011	Rise of the Planet of the Apes	Critics' Choice Movie Award for Best Supporting Actor	Nominated
2011	Rise of the Planet of the Apes	Houston Film Critics Society Award for Best Supporting Actor	Nominated
2011	Rise of the Planet of the Apes	San Diego Film Critics Society Award for Best Supporting Actor	Nominated
2011	Rise of the Planet of the Apes	Washington D.C. Area Film Critics Association Award for Best Supporting Actor	Nominated
2014	Dawn of the Planet of the Apes	Washington D.C. Area Film Critics Association Award for Best Supporting Actor	Nominated
2017	War for the Planet of the Apes	Washington D.C. Area Film Critics Association Award for Best Motion Capture Performance	Won
2017	War for the Planet of the Apes	San Francisco Film Critics Circle Award for Best Actor	Won

== Miscellaneous awards ==
Year	Nominated work	Category	Result
2003	The Lord of the Rings: The Return of the King	National Board of Review Award for Best Cast	Won
2005	Peter Jackson's King Kong: The Official Game of the Movie	Spike Video Game Award for Best Cast	Won
2009	Sex & Drugs & Rock & Roll	Evening Standard British Film Award for Best Actor	Won
2011	Enslaved: Odyssey to the West	Interactive Achievement Award for Outstanding Character Performance	Nominated

In July 2019, Serkis was awarded the honorary degree of Doctor of Letters (honoris causa) by the University of Lancaster for his role as a leading innovator in CGI and performance capture.
