= Andy Serkis =

English actor (born 1964)

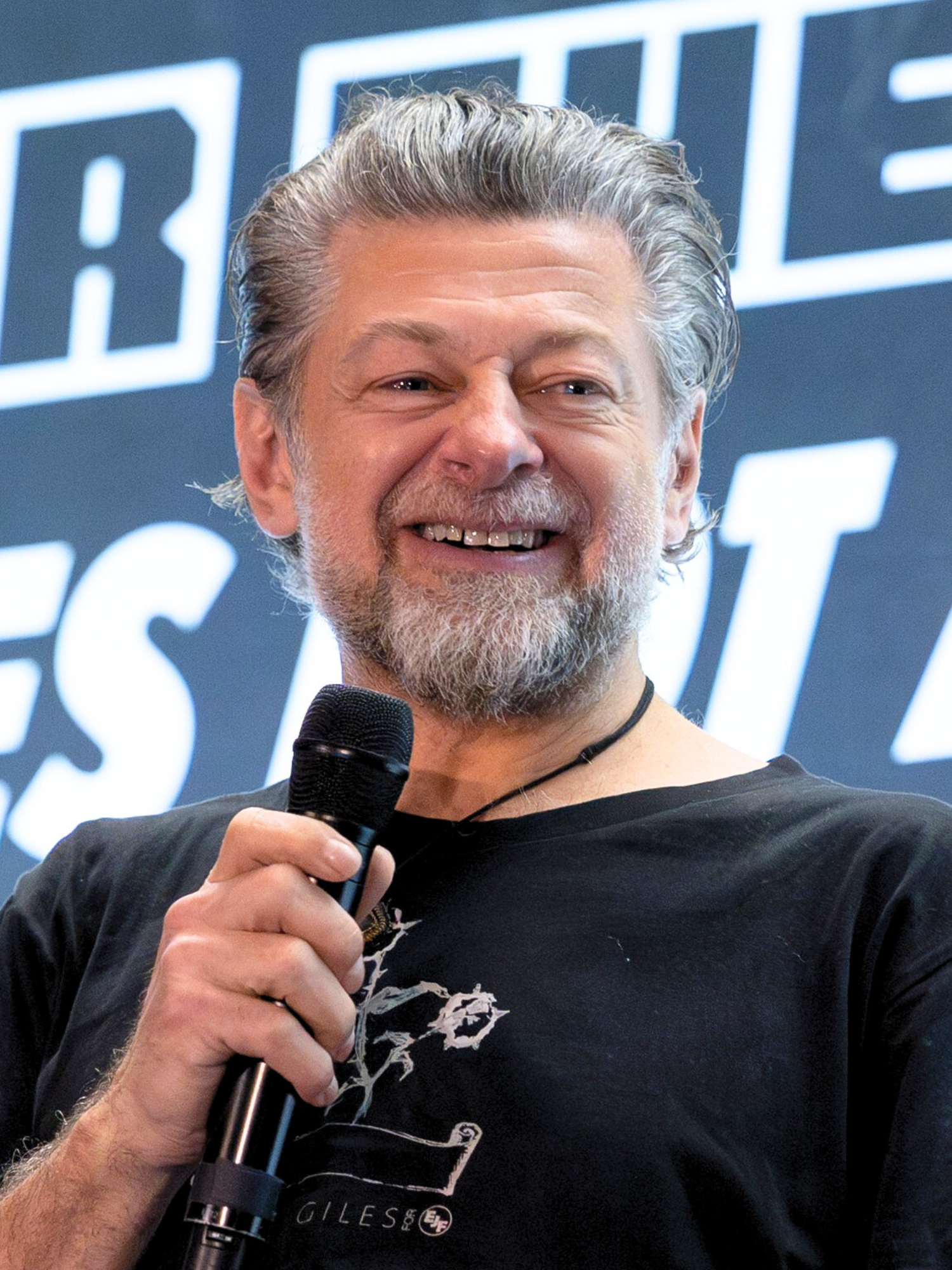
- Serkis in 2025
- Born: Andrew Clement Serkis; 20 April 1964 (age 62); Ruislip, Middlesex, England
- Education: Lancaster University
- Occupations: Actor; film director
- Years active: 1985–present
- Spouse: Lorraine Ashbourne (m. 2002)
- Children: 3, including Ruby and Louis
- Awards: Full list

Andrew Clement Serkis (born 20 April 1964) is an English actor and director. He is best known for his critically acclaimed roles comprising motion capture acting, animation, and voice acting for computer-generated characters such as Gollum in The Lord of the Rings film trilogy (2001–2003) and The Hobbit: An Unexpected Journey (2012), King Kong in the eponymous 2005 film, Caesar in the Planet of the Apes reboot series (2011–2017), Captain Haddock / Sir Francis Haddock in Steven Spielberg's The Adventures of Tintin (2011), Baloo in his self-directed film Mowgli: Legend of the Jungle (2018) and Supreme Leader Snoke in the Star Wars sequel trilogy films The Force Awakens (2015) and The Last Jedi (2017).

Serkis' film work in motion capture has been critically acclaimed. He has received various accolades including a BAFTA Award, an Emmy Award, an Empire Award, two Actor Awards and two Saturn Awards. He earned a BAFTA and a Golden Globe nomination for his portrayal of serial killer Ian Brady in the television film Longford (2006) and was nominated for another BAFTA for his portrayal of new wave and punk rock musician Ian Dury in the biopic Sex & Drugs & Rock & Roll (2010). In 2020, Serkis received the BAFTA Award for Outstanding British Contribution To Cinema. In 2021, he won a Daytime Emmy Award for the series The Letter for the King (2020).

Serkis portrayed Ulysses Klaue in the Marvel Cinematic Universe (MCU) films Avengers: Age of Ultron (2015) and Black Panther (2018), as well as the Disney+ series What If...? (2021). He also played Alfred Pennyworth in The Batman (2022) and Kino Loy in the Star Wars Disney+ series Andor (2022). Serkis has his own production company and motion capture workshop, The Imaginarium in London, which he used for Mowgli: Legend of the Jungle. He made his directorial debut with Imaginarium's 2017 film Breathe and also directed Venom: Let There Be Carnage (2021).

== Early life and education ==
Andrew Clement Serkis was born on 20 April 1964 in Ruislip, Middlesex (now Greater London). He grew up in both Ruislip and Baghdad, Iraq. His mother, Lylie Weech, was half English and half Iraqi, and taught disabled children; his father, Clement Serkis, was an Armenian from Iraq and a gynaecologist. His ancestors' original Armenian surname was Serkisian. His father often worked abroad in the Middle East, while Serkis and his siblings were raised in Britain, with regular holidays in the Levantine cities of Tyre, Sidon, Damascus, and also Baghdad. His parents were both devoutly Catholic.

Serkis was educated at St Benedict's School, Ealing. He studied visual arts and theatre as part of his degree at Lancaster University and graduated in 1985. Serkis was a member of The County College and part of the student radio station Bailrigg FM. He joined the Nuffield Studio, getting involved in designing and producing plays.

Having agreed to perform in a couple of productions towards the end of his first year, Serkis played the lead role in Barrie Keeffe's play Gotcha as a rebellious teenager holding a teacher hostage. As a result, he changed his major subject to acting, constructing his Independent Studies Degree around acting and set design, studying Konstantin Stanislavski and Bertolt Brecht, and including minor modules in art and visual graphics. In his final year at Lancaster he adapted Raymond Briggs's graphic novel The Tin-Pot Foreign General and the Old Iron Woman, a satire about the Falklands War, as a one-man show, which he performed to acclaim.

== Career ==
In his third year at university, Serkis joined the backstage team at the local Duke's Playhouse to earn his Equity card. On graduating, although advised to take a one-year post-graduate acting course, he joined Dukes as an actor. Under director Jonathan Petherbridge, who used workshops based on the methods of Augusto Boal, he spent 18 months acting in a broad range of productions from Brecht, Shakespeare and modern British playwrights.

After 16 months, and having gained his Equity card, Serkis joined a series of touring companies, including productions of: Bouncers opposite Hull Truck; Florizel in The Winter's Tale; and The Fool in King Lear with director Max Stafford-Clark. In the early 1990s he settled in London, and took a role in April De Angelis's Hush (Royal Court) as Dogboy. Also the Royal Court Theatre's production of Mojo, and Wilson Milam's production of Hurlyburly (1997) at the Queen's Theatre, Shaftesbury Avenue, with Rupert Graves and David Tennant. Serkis also developed a career in television, appearing in small roles such as Greville in an episode of The Darling Buds of May (1992) and a criminal called Maxwell in an episode of Pie in the Sky (1994). Serkis joined director Mike Leigh's ensemble for two film productions, and appeared in the romantic comedy Loop (1997) alongside Susannah York. He played Dennis in a 1997 Radio 3 broadcast of Loot by Orton, repeated in 2017. Serkis portrayed Victorian choreographer John D'Auban in Topsy-Turvy, a 1999 film about Gilbert and Sullivan's creation of The Mikado. In 1999, Serkis played Bill Sikes in ITV's adaptation of Oliver Twist. He appeared alongside Sacha Baron Cohen in The Jolly Boys' Last Stand in 2000.

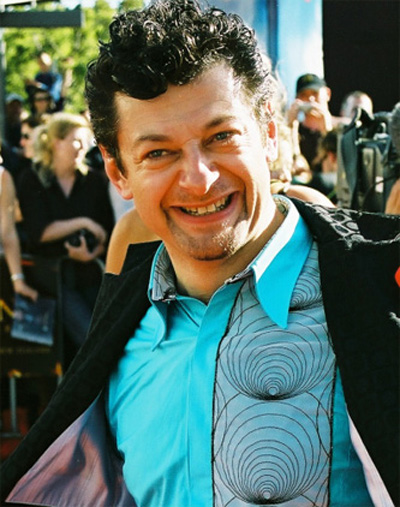
Serkis at the world premiere of The Lord of the Rings: The Return of the King in Wellington in 2003

Serkis first came to wide public notice for his performance as Sméagol / Gollum, in The Lord of the Rings film trilogy (2001–2003), for which he provided motion-capture movements and voice for the CGI character. His work on The Lord of the Rings started a debate on the legitimacy of CGI-assisted acting. Producer Barrie M. Osborne campaigned for Serkis to have been nominated for the Academy Award for Best Supporting Actor, as his voice, body language and facial expressions were used. The marketing director of New Line Cinema, Russell Schwartz, had likewise compared Serkis's motion capture presence to John Hurt winning Best Actor while wearing a latex mask in The Elephant Man.

Serkis has performed motion-capture work in several other films, including the title character in the 2005 version of King Kong (in which he also played the ship's cook in live-action) and as Caesar in Rise of the Planet of the Apes (2011), Dawn of the Planet of the Apes (2014), and War for the Planet of the Apes (2017). He also worked with game developers Ninja Theory on the 2007 release Heavenly Sword, providing the motion capture and voice for King Bohan (the game's main villain).

In 2006, Serkis starred as serial killer Ian Brady in the BAFTA-nominated Longford, co-starring Samantha Morton as Myra Hindley and Jim Broadbent as Lord Longford. That same year, Serkis appeared in the role of Mr. Grin in Stormbreaker, the film rendition of Anthony Horowitz's Alex Rider novel. He also acted in the film The Prestige as Mr. Alley (assistant to Nikola Tesla), as the voice of one of the henchrats in the Aardman Animations film Flushed Away named Spike, and appeared in Jim Threapleton's improvised feature film Extraordinary Rendition, which premiered in 2007. In 2007, he appeared in Sugarhouse, a low-budget independently made film, playing local crime lord Hoodwink, who terrorises an east London housing estate. For the role, Serkis shaved his head and had sessions lasting 20 hours each to have temporary tattoos stencilled onto his body. The film premiered at the 2007 Edinburgh Festival and released in the UK on 24 August. Also that year, Serkis provided the voiceover for Monkey Life, on Five broadcast for three weeks from 13 to 31 August 2007. This series was about Monkey World, the popular ape and monkey sanctuary and zoo near Wool, Dorset. In the joint BBC/HBO production Einstein and Eddington, (2008) Serkis played Albert Einstein, following the development of his theory of relativity, while David Tennant played scientist Sir Arthur Eddington. In 2008, Serkis appeared as Rigaud in the BBC Television adaptation of Charles Dickens' Little Dorrit and as Capricorn in Inkheart, the film adaptation of Cornelia Funke's novel. In 2010, Serkis played 1970s new wave singer Ian Dury in Sex & Drugs & Rock & Roll.

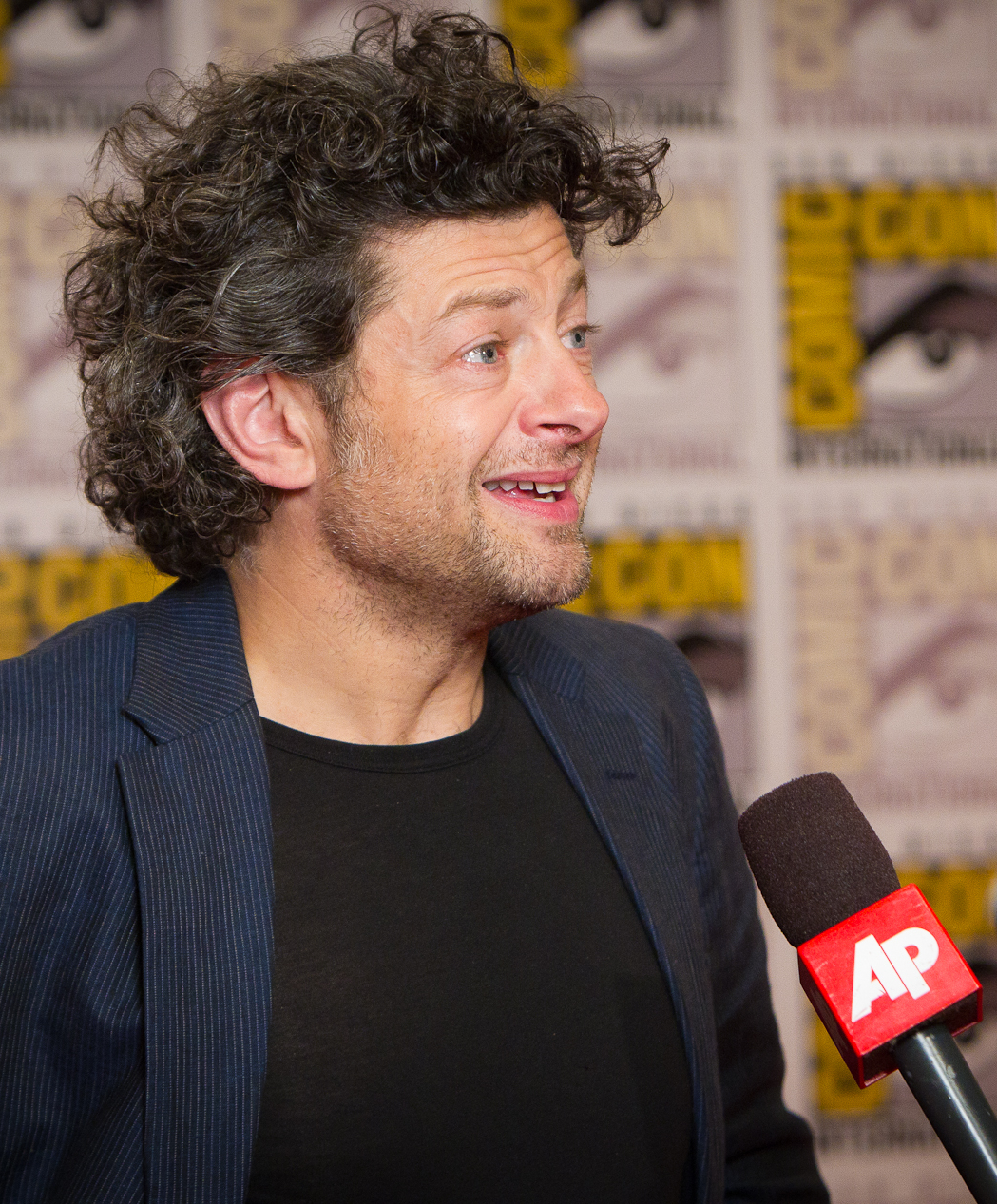
Serkis at the 2011 San Diego Comic-Con

Serkis reunited with Peter Jackson, as a cast member in Jackson's and Steven Spielberg's Tintin trilogy, based on The Adventures of Tintin. Serkis supplied the voice and motion capture performance of Captain Haddock as well as his ancestor, Sir Francis Haddock. Filming began in January 2009 and the film was released in 2011. Filming was due to begin in September 2008, but was delayed due to Universal pulling out of backing the project.

In 2009, Serkis voiced the role of the demon Screwtape in Focus on the Family's Radio Theatre audio adaptation of C. S. Lewis's The Screwtape Letters. In 2010, Serkis was cast as William Hare, with Simon Pegg as Burke, in the John Landis black comedy film Burke and Hare based on the Burke and Hare murders in Scotland in 1828. He also featured in the TV series The Accused, in "Liam's Story", written by Danny Brocklehurst and Jimmy McGovern. He played Caesar in the 20th Century Fox science-fiction film Rise of the Planet of the Apes. Serkis was acclaimed for his performance as Caesar in 2011, and in a high-profile campaign by 20th Century Fox for him to be honoured with a Best Supporting Actor Oscar nomination, his co-star James Franco stated: "Andy Serkis is the undisputed master of the newest kind of acting called 'motion capture,' and it is time that Serkis gets credit for the innovative artist that he is." In 2010, Serkis played Monkey, the lead character along with Lindsey Shaw in the videogame Enslaved: Odyssey to the West.

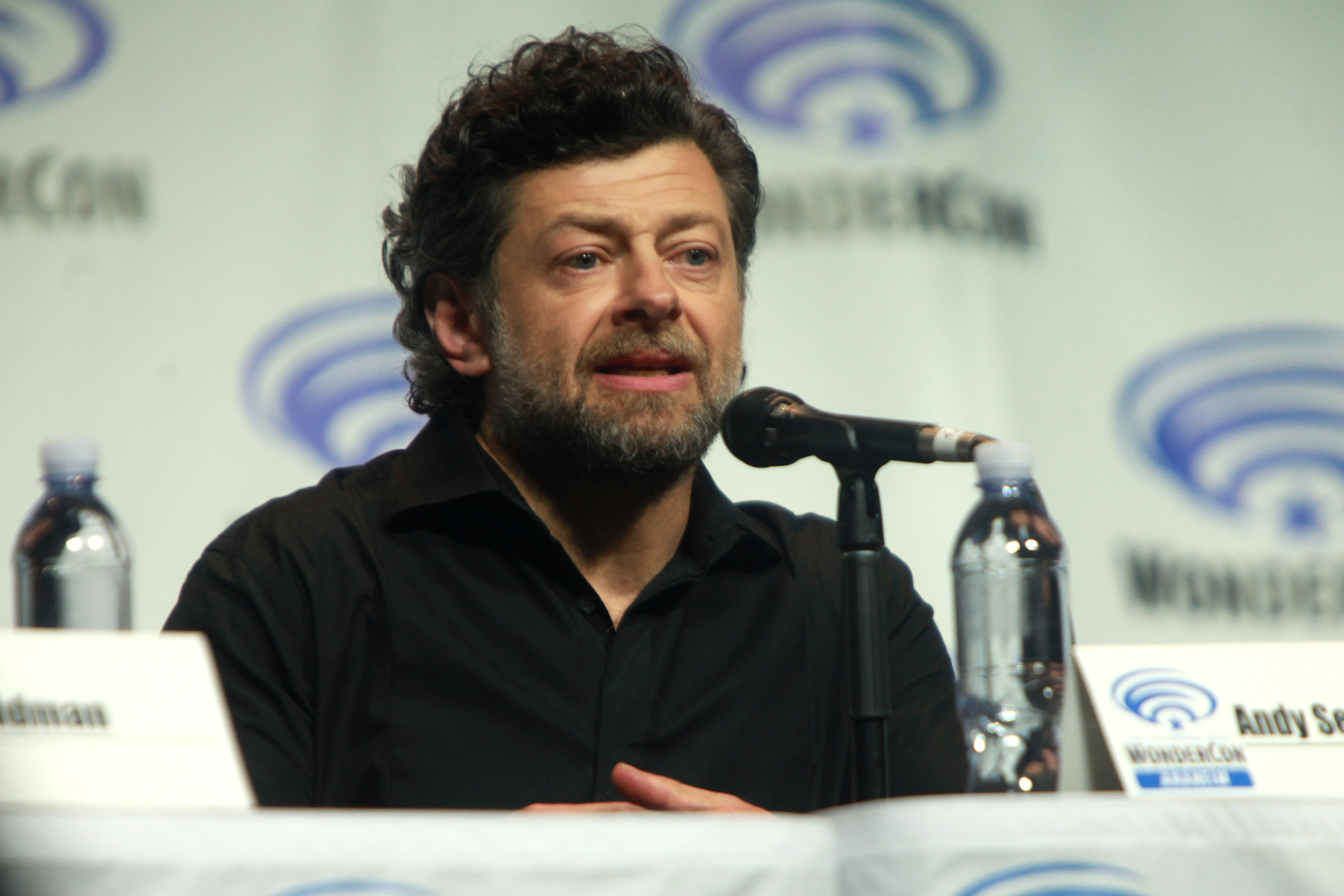
Serkis promoting Dawn of the Planet of the Apes at the 2014 San Diego Comic-Con

Serkis would reprise the role of Gollum in The Hobbit: An Unexpected Journey, the first film in the three-part The Hobbit films. It was released in 2012, and the follow-ups were released in 2013 and 2014. He was also the trilogy's second unit director, which included directing aerial shots and battle scenes. He was invited to join the Academy of Motion Picture Arts and Sciences in June 2012. In 2014, Serkis reprised his role as Caesar in Dawn of the Planet of the Apes, and again in 2017 for War for the Planet of the Apes, the last of the trilogy.

In Gareth Edwards' 2014 science-fiction monster film Godzilla, Serkis was the consultant on the film's motion capture sequences to "control the souls" of the creatures. Serkis played Ulysses Klaue in Marvel Studios' Avengers: Age of Ultron (2015), and was also a motion capture consultant on the film. He reprised the role in Marvel Studios' Black Panther (2018), and provided the voice in the sixth episode of Marvel's What If...?. He played Supreme Leader Snoke in Star Wars: The Force Awakens (2015) and reprised the role in Star Wars: The Last Jedi (2017), and Star Wars: The Rise of Skywalker (2019). Serkis appeared as the Ghost of Christmas Past in the 2019 BBC/FX three-part miniseries A Christmas Carol. In 2019, it was announced that Serkis would play Alfred Pennyworth in The Batman (2022).

In late 2015, it was announced that Serkis was working on a modern film adaptation of Rumpelstiltskin, titled Steelskin. In addition to starring in the film, Serkis will serve as producer and director.

Serkis received a Daytime Emmy Award for Outstanding Guest Performer in a Daytime Fiction Program in 2021 for his role as Mayor of Mistrinaut, the father of his real life daughter Ruby's character, in the Netflix fantasy series The Letter for the King. Also for Netflix, Serkis is scheduled to star alongside Idris Elba and Cynthia Erivo in Luther: The Fallen Sun, a television film continuation of Elba's series, Luther. In 2022, Serkis returned to the Star Wars franchise in a different, non-CGI role in the Disney+ television series Andor, as Kino Loy.

Serkis was nominated for the 2023 Offie for Best Lead Performer - Ulster American.

In October 2024 it was revealed that Serkis would star as Renoir in the video game Clair Obscur: Expedition 33, which released on 24 April 2025.

In August 2025, Serkis narrated the English version of LouiMax Dreams of Being an Adult, a Danish stop motion animated short film directed by Eric Hogan and Tara Hungerford, and based on Dorthe Mailil's Maileg toys.

Serkis played Major-General Edward Braddock in the 2026 film Young Washington.

=== The Imaginarium ===
In 2011, Serkis founded The Imaginarium with film producer Jonathan Cavendish. The Imaginarium is a production company connected to a performance capture studio based in London and is dedicated to producing film & television, alongside the sister company The Imaginarium Studios using performance capture technology, which Serkis has often worked with.

=== Directing ===
Serkis served as the second unit director for The Hobbit films and made his directorial debut with Breathe (2017). He also directed and starred in the film, Mowgli: Legend of the Jungle. In August 2019, Serkis closed a deal to direct the superhero film Venom: Let There Be Carnage, the sequel to Venom (2018). It was released in theatres in October 2021. In April 2022, he was set to direct Animal Farm, an animated adaptation of George Orwell's novella of the same name. In May 2024, it was announced that Serkis would direct, executive produce, and star in The Lord of the Rings: The Hunt for Gollum for Warner Bros. Pictures, a working title for a new instalment in the Lord of the Rings film series, with Fran Walsh and Philippa Boyens co-writing the screenplay and Jackson co-producing alongside Walsh and Boyens; the film was expected to be released in 2026. It was later set for release on December 17, 2027.

== Other activities ==
Serkis made an appearance in the music video for Neneh Cherry's "Woman", portraying an abusive boyfriend, in 1996. After portraying Gollum in The Lord of the Rings series, he published a memoir about his experiences, titled Gollum: How We Made Movie Magic, published in late 2004. In 2015, Serkis collaborated with rock band Coldplay in the making of the music video for "Adventure of a Lifetime". The group performed as chimpanzees with Serkis acting as a motion-capture consultant.

In December 2018, he appeared in a video for People's Vote as UK Prime Minister Theresa May using the voice of Gollum, spoofing May's Brexit deal. He also appears in the BBC Earth programme, Neanderthals: Meet Your Ancestors.

Serkis, together with fellow Lord of the Rings castmates Sean Astin, Sean Bean, Orlando Bloom, Billy Boyd, Ian McKellen, Dominic Monaghan, Viggo Mortensen, Miranda Otto, John Rhys-Davies, Liv Tyler, Karl Urban and Elijah Wood, plus writer Philippa Boyens and director Peter Jackson, on 1 May 2020 joined Josh Gad's YouTube series Reunited Apart, which reunites the cast of popular films through video-conferencing due to the COVID-19 pandemic, and promotes donations to charities.

Serkis and producer Andrew Levitas are creating a comic book series titled Eternus, about Heracles, the son of Zeus, trying to identify Zeus's killer. The first issue of the series was released on 3 August 2022.

=== Audiobooks and charity ===
During the COVID-19 lockdown, on VE Day, Serkis read the entire book of The Hobbit to raise money for NHS Charities Together and Best Beginnings, a pregnancy charity of which he has been an ambassador. More than 650,000 people tuned in worldwide, and Serkis raised more than £283,000 ($351,000). On 2 July 2020, HarperCollinsUK announced that Serkis would professionally narrate The Hobbit again to be published for Audible. The audiobook was released on 3 September 2020 in the UK, published by HarperCollins, and 21 September in the US, published by Recorded Books. The cover art, by Alan Lee, was drawn specially for the release.

On 7 July 2021, HarperCollinsUK and Recorded Books announced Serkis would follow up his narration of The Hobbit with a professional recording of all three The Lord of the Rings novels that were released on 16 September. The CDs were released on 14 October 2021.

In 2022, Serkis recorded a new audiobook version of the Terry Pratchett Discworld book Small Gods with Bill Nighy and Peter Serafinowicz.

== Personal life ==
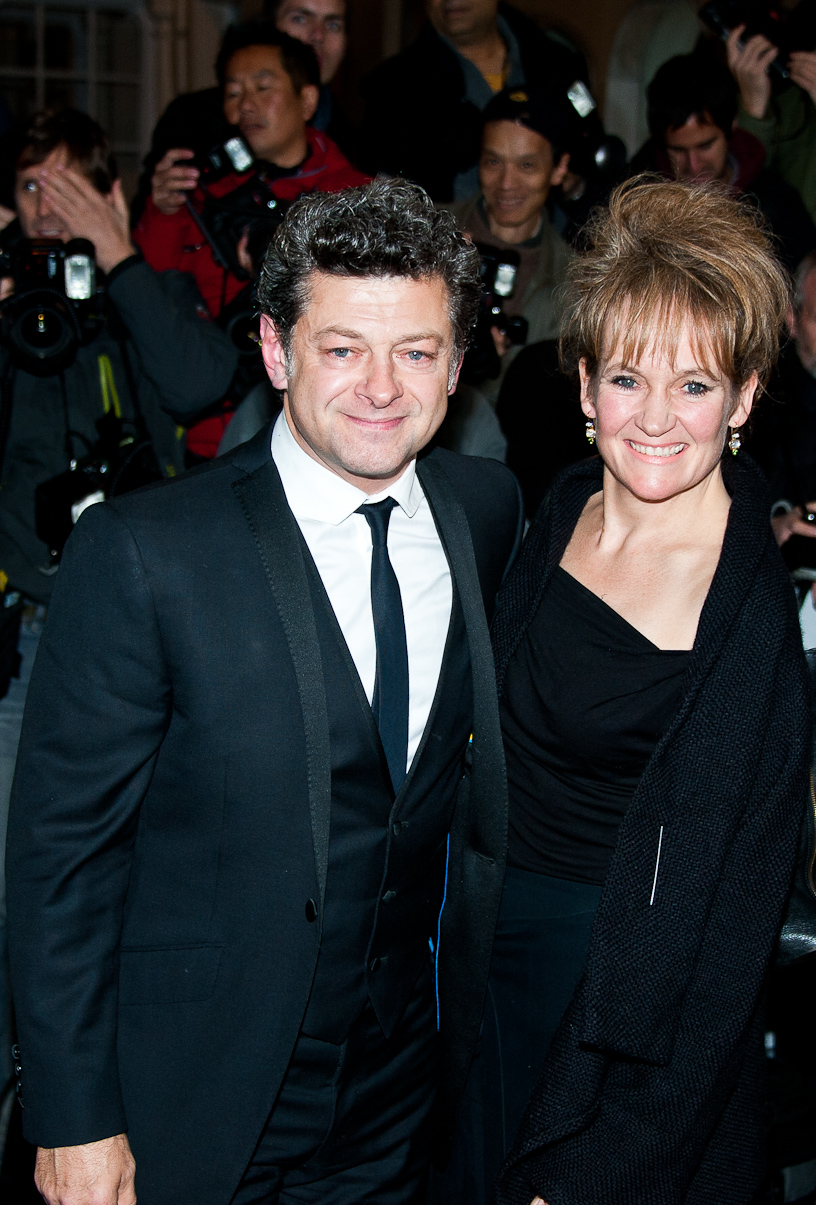
Serkis and his wife Lorraine Ashbourne in 2013

Serkis married actress Lorraine Ashbourne in July 2002. They live in Crouch End, North London, and have three children, Ruby (b. 1998), Sonny (b. 2000) and Louis (b. 2004), all of whom are actors. They starred in the 2019 film The Kid Who Would Be King and the 2020 Netflix series The Letter for the King respectively. Serkis also starred alongside Ruby, and they played father and daughter. Louis also voiced Bhoot in Mowgli: Legend of the Jungle, which was directed by and co-starred his father as Baloo.

Although Serkis was raised in the Catholic faith of his parents, he has been an atheist since his teenage years. However, he has stated the culture of Catholicism is still important to him and his family.

Serkis was a member of the Socialist Workers Party in the early 1990s.

== Filmography and accolades ==
Directed features
Year	Title	Distribution
2017	Breathe	Bleecker Street
2018	Mowgli: Legend of the Jungle	Netflix
2021	Venom: Let There Be Carnage	Sony Pictures Releasing
2025	Animal Farm	Angel Studios
2027	The Lord of the Rings: The Hunt for Gollum	Warner Bros. Pictures

== Selected theatre ==
- The Porter in Macbeth. Directed by Braham Murray at the Royal Exchange, Manchester. (1988)
- Tony Lumpkin in She Stoops to Conquer by Oliver Goldsmith. Directed by James Maxwell at the Royal Exchange, Manchester. (1990)
- Sean Grogan in Your Home in the West by Rod Wooden. World premiere directed by Braham Murray at the Royal Exchange, Manchester. (1991)
- Doctor Jan Heart in Doctor Heart by Peter Muller. English premiere directed by Braham Murray at the Royal Exchange, Manchester. (1991)
- David in Unidentified Human Remains and the True Nature of Love by Brad Fraser. Directed by Braham Murray at the Royal Exchange, Manchester. (1995)
- Iago in Othello. Directed by Braham Murray at the Royal Exchange, Manchester. (2002)

== See also ==
- Motion-capture acting
