= The Honourable Woman =

2014 British spy thriller television series

- Genre: Political thriller Spy thriller
- Written by: Hugo Blick
- Directed by: Hugo Blick
- Starring: Maggie Gyllenhaal; Philip Arditti; Lubna Azabal; Andrew Buchan; Eve Best; Lindsay Duncan; Janet McTeer; Tobias Menzies; Igal Naor; Genevieve O'Reilly; Katherine Parkinson; Stephen Rea
- Composer: Martin Phipps
- Country of origin: United Kingdom
- Original language: English
- No. of episodes: 8

Production
- Executive producers: Greg Brenman; Polly Hill
- Producers: Hugo Blick; Abi Bach
- Cinematography: Zac Nicholson; George Steel
- Editor: Jason Krasucki
- Running time: 58 minutes
- Production companies: BBC Worldwide; Drama Republic; Eight Rooks; SundanceTV

Original release
- Network: BBC Two
- Release: 3 July – 21 August 2014

The Honourable Woman is a 2014 British political spy thriller television miniseries in eight parts, written and directed by Hugo Blick for the BBC and SundanceTV. Featuring Maggie Gyllenhaal in the title role, it aired on BBC Two in the United Kingdom on 3 July 2014.

The Honourable Woman received positive reviews, with Gyllenhaal winning a Golden Globe Award for her performance, Stephen Rea winning the 2015 British Academy Television Award for Best Supporting Actor, and the series being awarded a Peabody Award in 2015.

== Synopsis ==
Eight years after taking over the family company from her brother Ephra Stein, Anglo-Jewish businesswoman Nessa Stein is made a life peer for her continued commitment to the Middle East peace process. She becomes The Rt Hon. Baroness Stein of Tilbury.

When her new business partner dies in a mysterious suicide, Lady Stein is forced to delay the third phase of an ambitious and long-planned project: connecting the West Bank with optical fibre cables. Various stakeholders manoeuvre for influence in connection with this venture.

The stakes become the highest possible for the family when Kasim, the son of Atika Halabi, a Palestinian translator/housekeeper and Nessa Stein's very close friend, is kidnapped. Soon, a mystery around his parentage comes to light, and further secrets are revealed.

== Cast and characters ==
=== Main cast ===
- Maggie Gyllenhaal as Nessa Stein, Baroness Stein of Tilbury, an Anglo-Jewish businesswoman who eight years earlier became the new head of the Stein Group after her brother abruptly stepped down, and who has just been appointed a life peer because of her philanthropic work with her company.
- Andrew Buchan as Ephra Stein, Nessa's brother, who successfully ran the family business for a number of years until he suddenly handed over the reins to his sister eight years earlier and took a back seat.
- Stephen Rea as Sir Hugh Hayden-Hoyle, Bt, the outgoing head of MI6's Middle East desk.
- Lubna Azabal as Atika Halabi, a Palestinian translator who is a close friend and Nessa's and Ephra's housekeeper.
- Janet McTeer as Dame Julia Walsh, the head of MI6.
- Katherine Parkinson as Rachel Stein, Ephra's very pregnant wife.
- Tobias Menzies as Nathaniel Bloom, Nessa's chief of security.
- Eve Best as Monica Chatwin, an ambitious British Foreign Office tactician stationed in Washington, D.C.
- Igal Naor as Shlomo Zahary, an Israeli businessman and surrogate uncle to Nessa and Ephra.
- Genevieve O'Reilly as Frances Pirsig, Nessa's private secretary and confidante.
- Lindsay Duncan as Anjelica, Lady Hayden-Hoyle, Hayden-Hoyle's ex-wife.
- Philip Arditti as Saleh Al-Zahid, a Palestinian who commits malevolent acts towards the Stein family for reasons eventually revealed.

Hugo Blick re-uses several actors from his previous series The Shadow Line (e.g. Stephen Rea, Tobias Menzies and Eve Best).

=== Recurring cast ===
- Nasser Memarzia as Zahid Al-Zahid
- Oliver Bodur as Kasim Halabi
- Adnan Rashed as Samir Meshal
- Raad Rawi as Jalal El-Amin
- Julia Montgomery Brown as Rebecca Lantham aka Tracy
- Nicholas Woodeson as Israeli diplomat Judah Ben-Shahar
- Richard Katz as Aron Yavin
- John MacKay as Caleb Schwako
- Lachele Carl as US Secretary of State
- Laurel Lefkow as Kate Larsson, special advisor to the Secretary of State
- Paul Herzberg as Daniel Borgoraz
- Martin Hutson as MI6 agent Max Boorman
- Martin McDougall as Brigadier General Berkoff
- George Georgiou as Palestinian diplomat Magdi Muraji
- Uriel Emil as Shimon Ben Reuven
- Claire-Louise Cordwell as Gail Gatz
- Jacob Krichefski as Yaniv Levi
- Justin Shevlin as Tom Crace
- Aidan Stephenson as Eli Stein', Nessa's father
- Lois Ellington as young Nessa

== Episodes ==
No.	Title	Directed by	Written by	Original release date	UK viewers (millions)
1	"The Empty Chair"	Hugo Blick	Hugo Blick	3 July 2014	3.21
Twenty-nine years ago, a young Ephra and Nessa Stein witness their father's murder. In present day London, Nessa is appointed a life peer thanks to her philanthropic efforts in the Middle East. She announces that her company, the Stein Group, has awarded a much vied-for West Bank engineering contract to Samir Meshal, a Palestinian. He is promptly discovered dead, an apparent suicide that raises many questions. Monica Chatwin of MI6 makes her presence known to Nessa and reminds Ephra of a secret she keeps. Sir Hugh Hayden-Hoyle, of the Middle East desk at MI6, ponders his dwindling career and failed marriage. Ephra takes his children and Kasim, his housekeeper's child, to a classical musical concert. Kasim is kidnapped and Nessa gives chase on foot. Nessa's bodyguard follows and is shot by the kidnappers.
2	"The Unfaithful Husband"	Hugo Blick	Hugo Blick	10 July 2014	2.52
Hayden-Hoyle investigates the 'suicide' of Samir Meshal while the police investigate Kasim's kidnapping. The kidnappers reveal that they know a secret that Nessa and Atika share, to the great distress of Nessa. The secret is linked with Nessa and Atika being kidnapped in Gaza eight years earlier. Hayden-Hoyle uncovers a woman claiming to have been Meshal's mistress, who is actually an undercover FBI agent. She is lured to a deserted place at night and killed by an unidentified agent. The Americans admit to involvement in Meshal's death, while it is revealed that Ephra and Atika are having an affair.
3	"The Killing Call"	Hugo Blick	Hugo Blick	17 July 2014	2.29
In the course of the police investigation, they conduct a paternity test on Kasim's DNA to see if he is Ephra's son. The test results are negative - after Atika tampers with the DNA. Shlomo and Nessa discover that someone has been feeding Nessa false information to convince her that Shlomo is dealing with Hezbollah. Nathaniel, Nessa's bodyguard, investigates the kidnapping and is killed as a result, along with the family of one of the kidnappers.
4	"The Ribbon Cutter"	Hugo Blick	Hugo Blick	24 July 2014	2.28
This flashback episode focuses on Nessa's activities eight years earlier. A naïve young Nessa visits the West Bank for a ribbon-cutting ceremony at a Palestinian educational institution the Steins are funding, but she uncovers possible corruption. She asks her Palestinian translator, Atika, if she can help sneak her into Gaza to investigate. The two women go and are swiftly kidnapped. While imprisoned, Nessa is raped by one of her captors, Saleh Al-Zahid, and becomes pregnant by him. We learn the rapist is the son of the man who had Nessa's father murdered 21 years earlier. Following the rape, Atika sets fire to the rapist and, later, Nessa pleads with their kidnappers not to punish Atika and they agree. Saleh Al-Zahid is also the man who will kidnap Kasim in the present day.
5	"Two Hearts"	Hugo Blick	Hugo Blick	31 July 2014	2.06
Ephra works frantically to free his kidnapped sister, while her kidnapping is kept a secret from all but a few confidantes. It is revealed the possible corruption Nessa was investigating was actually a cover for funds Ephra contributed to free an Israeli soldier being held hostage. Ultimately, after a year in captivity, Nessa is freed after Ephra makes a deal with Monica Chatwin of MI6. In exchange for Ephra stepping down from leadership of the Stein Group and confiding a number of secrets pertaining to the telecommunications cable in the West Bank to Chatwin, she works to get Dame Julia to approve a raid with the Israelis to rescue Nessa. Nessa asks Atika to raise Kasim as her own, because Nessa feels if the world knows she is raising the child fathered by a Palestinian terrorist who raped her, her effectiveness at working towards peace will be compromised. In the present day, Nessa learns that Monica Chatwin was the one who falsified Shlomo's file to make it appear he had dealt with Hezbollah. Meanwhile, there is a scandal at a Stein-funded Israeli school, where a teacher accuses the school of discriminating against Arabs. The teacher's investigations uncover a secret surveillance room in the school, and the teacher is murdered.
6	"The Mother Line"	Hugo Blick	Hugo Blick	7 August 2014	2.26
Nessa goes out drinking and ends up being beaten and raped by a man who picks her up. Nessa is later contacted by Jalal El-Amin, a Palestinian businessman who is affiliated with Kasim's kidnappers, who demands that she set up a business partnership with him in exchange for Kasim's release. Meanwhile, Shlomo begins investigations of his own to find out who has set him up and tapped into the telecommunications cable. He shows his evidence to Nessa, who tearfully confronts Ephra about how he has now compromised their company and good name. Shlomo also tells Hayden-Hoyle about it, leading to him figuring out that the Americans were part of the wiretap and that was why they killed Samir Meshal.
7	"The Hollow Wall"	Hugo Blick	Hugo Blick	14 August 2014	2.33
It turns out that Saleh Al-Zahid (Nessa's rapist/Kasim's kidnapper) is working with Monica Chatwin. Nessa reveals her secrets to Hayden-Hoyle, and he begins to investigate Monica Chatwin's actions, which are completely unauthorised. Nessa travels to the West Bank to inaugurate her new project with El-Amin. Ephra and Atika reconcile and sneak away to a cottage, but Atika has betrayed Ephra and has led him there to be murdered by Saleh Al-Zahid. Ephra's wife Rachel walks in on the assassination and kills her husband's killer. Simultaneously, a bomb explodes at Nessa's event, killing everyone in its path, and the TV news declares Nessa dead. Rachel goes into labour, and Atika helps her deliver the baby while MI6 agents arrive to arrest her. At Monica Chatwin's order, credit for the twin assassination of the Steins is publicly (and falsely) claimed by an Israeli terrorist group.
8	"The Paring Knife"	Hugo Blick	Hugo Blick	21 August 2014	2.23
Hayden-Hoyle and Dame Julia piece together the events of the last few weeks, involving the Americans, the Palestinians, and the Israelis listening in on the information transmitted through the cable and each carrying out their own assassinations. The upshot is a lot of people are dead, and the Americans have shifted their policy and will no longer oppose Palestinian statehood in the UN. Much has been engineered by Monica Chatwin, who is gunning for the top spot in MI6 and who was using the peace process to accomplish this goal. It is revealed that Nessa survived the bomb blast but has been kidnapped by the same group that kidnapped her 8 years earlier. The man who engineered it all, Zahid Al-Zahid, confronts her and tells her of his plans, then lets her go but refuses to give her her son back. Hayden-Hoyle convinces Atika that Palestinian statehood can be achieved within the next few days, but not if the Palestinian involvement in the attacks becomes publicly known. Atika is freed by MI6 in order to convince the Palestinians to release Nessa Stein. An unexpected betrayal makes Atika decide to free Kasim and return him to Nessa. Atika drives frantically to catch up with Nessa before she can be killed by the American agent sent to intercept her. Atika and the American agent both perish but Nessa and Kasim make it safely to the Israeli border.

== Production ==
The eight-part series was announced in June 2013. It was commissioned by Ben Stephenson (Controller, BBC Drama Commissioning) and Janice Hadlow (Controller, BBC Two), and co-funded by the Sundance Channel. Written and directed by Hugo Blick, it was made by production companies Drama Republic and Eight Rooks, with Hugo Blick and Abi Bach as producers.

Stephenson describes the drama as "really grown up, complicated" and said he was keen to work with Blick again following the 2011 series The Shadow Line. The President of the Sundance Channel Sarah Barnett said that it is "a superbly wrought character piece about hope, compromise, guilt and families". Speaking about her casting, Gyllenhaal said: "I couldn't put the scripts down. Nessa is such an exciting and intricate character. I can't wait to begin filming."

=== Filming ===
The three-month filming schedule began in July 2013 in London and Romney Marsh in Kent, with further filming in the Middle East and the United States. Gyllenhaal's performance was informed by private decisions she made about her character's life; for example, she decided that Nessa was 104 years old, and that she was high on mushrooms in one scene. Gyllenhaal did not share these choices with Blick because she did not think he would understand.

== Reception ==
=== Critical response ===
The series was warmly received upon its initial debut in the UK, with The Guardian's Gabriel Tate summarising the series as "the most satisfying, densely plotted TV series for years."

The Honorable Woman (retitled to follow American spelling) premiered in the United States, with strong reviews coming from The New York Times, The Washington Post, New York, Entertainment Weekly, Time and the Los Angeles Times, and received a Metacritic score of 82 out of 100 based on 24 reviews, indicating "universal acclaim". Particular raves came from Matt Roush of TV Guide, who described Blick's work as "written and directed with ruthless intelligence," and Tim Goodman of The Hollywood Reporter, calling the miniseries "a spectacularly well-constructed story—intricate, dense, demanding and rewarding.

Specific notices focused on Gyllenhaal—Hank Stuever of The Washington Post described her performance as "remarkably measured and moving," while Alessandra Stanley of The New York Times said "Ms. Gyllenhaal is remarkable playing a principled but conflicted woman whose quicksilver personality alters from hour to hour and flashback to flash-forward" and on the series' mature treatment of gender roles. Sara Stewart of Indiewire credited The Honourable Woman with "upending the sexy spy drama," celebrating it for favouring the protagonist's intellect and interior complexity over romantic and sexual conflict. Sarah Chalmers of The Telegraph, meanwhile, said: "For here, at last, is a new kind of female protagonist: one not only driving the drama and outwitting the male characters, but looking amazing as she does so."

Responses in the UK to the series' conclusion were extremely positive. Julia Raeside of The Guardian wrote that it concluded as a "taut and perfectly controlled thriller ... something truly special." Nicholas Blincoe of The Telegraph, claimed that the series achieved the "must-watch" label of the summer.

The ending of The Honourable Woman was met with raves in the US; Willa Paskin of Slate praised the conclusion, explaining that "The Honorable Woman, unlike so many series that claim to do so, genuinely complicates notions of villainhood and herodom. It does not shortchange historical atrocity, pooh-pooh grievances, or whitewash systematic injustices." Tim Goodman of The Hollywood Reporter said, in terms of the series' conclusion, "Few things this dense and ambitious are able to stick the landing when the last act comes, but The Honorable Woman does it with aplomb." A more critical look at the series as a whole came from Sonia Saraiya at The A.V. Club, who explained that "The story lobs so many ideas into the air that it can't possibly give them all a safe landing. But along the way to the ending, The Honorable Woman is enthralling—a beautiful, dark portrait of a woman against the backdrop of the continued conflict between Israel and Palestine."

The series ranked on several publications' year-end top 10 lists, including The Hollywood Reporter, the Los Angeles Times, The Wall Street Journal, The Guardian and Grantland.

=== Accolades ===
At the 72nd Golden Globe Awards, Maggie Gyllenhaal won for Best Actress – Miniseries or Television Film. At the 21st Screen Actors Guild Awards, Gyllenhaal was nominated for Outstanding Performance by a Female Actor in a Miniseries or Television Movie. At the 5th Critics' Choice Television Awards, it received three nominations, for Best Movie/Miniseries, Gyllenhaal for Best Actress in a Movie/Miniseries, and Janet McTeer for Best Supporting Actress in a Movie/Miniseries. The series was nominated for the 2015 TCA Award for Outstanding Achievement in Movies, Miniseries and Specials.

The Honourable Woman was awarded with a 2014 Peabody Award, with the organisation writing: "A visually rich, densely-plotted thriller set against the backdrop of the Israeli-Palestine conflict, it suggests complexities and age-old vendettas that often escape even the best documentaries, to say nothing of the evening news."

At the 67th Primetime Emmy Awards, the series received nominations for Outstanding Limited or Anthology Series, Maggie Gyllenhaal for Outstanding Lead Actress in a Limited or Anthology Series or Movie, and Hugo Blick for both Outstanding Directing and Outstanding Writing for a Limited or Anthology Series or Movie.

== Home media release ==
The Honourable Woman was released on DVD in the UK on 1 September 2014, in the US on 14 October 2014, and in Canada on 25 November 2014.

The series was released on Blu-ray Disc in the UK on 20 July 2015.
