= California Avenue (TV series) =

British television series

- Genre: Drama
- Created by: Hugo Blick
- Written by: Hugo Blick
- Starring: Bill Nighy; Erin Doherty; Helena Bonham Carter; Tom Burke
- Country of origin: United Kingdom
- Original language: English
- No. of series: 1

Production
- Executive producers: Hugo Blick; Greg Brenman; Bill Nighy; Helena Bonham Carter; Lucy Richer
- Producer: Colin Wratten
- Production companies: Eight Rooks; Drama Republic

Original release
- Network: BBC One

California Avenue is an upcoming BBC One television drama series from Hugo Blick, starring Bill Nighy, Erin Doherty, Helena Bonham Carter, and Tom Burke.

== Premise ==
A young woman on the run with her child seeks shelter in a secluded caravan park in the British countryside.

== Cast ==
- Bill Nighy as Jerry
- Erin Doherty as Lela
- Helena Bonham Carter as Eddie
- Tom Burke as Cooper
- Kate Robbins
- Paul Kaye
- Cammie Liebreich

== Production ==
The series is from Hugo Blick and produced by Drama Republic and was first announced to be in development in February 2025.

The series is produced by Colin Wratten with executive producers including Blick for Eight Rooks, Greg Brenman for Drama Republic, Bill Nighy, Helena Bonham Carter, and Lucy Richer. Nighy and Bonham Carter also lead the cast alongside Erin Doherty and Tom Burke with Kate Robbins, Paul Kaye and Cammie Liebreich.

Filming took place in Hertfordshire, England in August 2025.

== Release ==
California Avenue had its world premiere as the closing series of the 2026 Canneseries.
