= 2026 Canneseries =

2026 television festival

2026 Cannes International Series Festival
- Location: Cannes, France
- Founded: 2018
- Awards: Best Series: Alice and Steve by Sophie Goodhart
- Festival date: 23–28 April 2026
- Website: canneseries.com/en

Canneseries
- 2025

The 9th edition of the Cannes International Series Festival (Canneseries) is a television festival that took place from 23 to 28 April 2026 in Cannes, France. It opened with HBO drama series Half Man and closed with BBC One drama series California Avenue.

Scottish actor and creator Richard Gadd was presented with the Konbini Prix de l'Engagement and the festival honored American actor Adam Scott with the Canal+ Icon Award. South Korean actress Jisoo received the Madame Figaro Rising Star Award.

== Juries ==
The following juries were named for the festival.

=== Competition ===
- Isabel Coixet, Spanish director, Jury President
- Simon Astier, French actor
- Ruth Barrett, British composer
- Vincent Elbaz, French actor
- Lesli Linka Glatter, American director
- Mamadou Sidibé, French actor

=== Short Form Competition ===
- Olivia Côte, French actress, Jury President
- Hiba Bennani, French-Moroccan actress
- Roman Doduik, French comedian

=== Docuseries Competition ===
- Amy J. Berg, American filmmaker, Jury President
- Léa Camilleri, French content creator and author
- Oxmo Puccino, Malian-French rapper

== Official selection ==
=== Opening and closing series ===
Title	Original title	Creator(s)	Production countrie(s)	Network
Half Man (opening series)		Richard Gadd	United Kingdom	HBO
California Avenue (closing series)		Hugo Blick	United Kingdom	BBC One

=== In competition ===
The following series were selected to compete:

Title	Original title	Creator(s)	Production countrie(s)	Network
Alice and Steve		Sophie Goodhart	United Kingdom	Disney+
Guts	Kylmä Kausi	Jemina Jokisalo	Finland, Slovenia	Yle
Harvest	HØST	Martin Zandvliet	Denmark	DR
I Always Sometimes	Yo siempre a veces	Marta Bassols, Marta Loza	Spain	Movistar Plus+
Many People Need to Die	Se tiene que morir mucha gente	Victoria Martín	Spain	Movistar Plus+
The Red and the Black	سرخ و سیاه	Ida Panahandeh	Iran	Filimo
Snake Killer	Slangedræber	Anders Ølholm	Denmark	Prime Video
Summer of 1985	Svärtan	Björn Stein	Sweden	SVT

=== Out of competition ===
Title	Original title	Creator(s)	Production countrie(s)	Network
Paris Police 1910		Fabien Nury	France	Canal+
Prisoner		Matt Charman	United Kingdom	Sky, Canal+
Star City		Ben Nedivi, Matt Wolpert, Ronald D. Moore	United States	Apple TV
The Terror: Devil in Silver		Chris Cantwell, Victor LaValle	United States	AMC+, Shudder

=== Short Form Competition ===
Title	Original title	Creator(s)	Production countrie(s)	Network
Avant qu'on m'oublie		Olivier Aubé	Canada	TV5 Unis
Boho		Abbie Boutkabout	Belgium	Streamz
Ina		Rachel Maxine Anderson	Australia	YouTube
Paradoxes		Maxime Donzel, Émilie Valentin, Pierre Zandrowicz	France, Greece	Arte, Cosmote TV
Sheep		Alex Reinberg, Leni Gruber	Austria, Germany	ZDF, ORF
Sneakermania		Vilja Keskimäki, Jani Airiainen, Aleksi Aro-Heinilä	Finland	Yle

=== Docuseries Competition ===
Title	Original title	Creator(s)	Production countrie(s)	Network
Colonna, A Corsican Tragedy	Colonna, une tragédie corse	Ariane Chemin, Agnès Pizzini	France	France Télévisions
Cruyff	Cruijff	Sam Blair	United Kingdom, Netherlands	NTR
The Deal with Iran		Lennart Stuyck, Maarten Stuyck	Belgium	VRT Canvas
The Oligarch and the Art Dealer		Andreas Dalsgaard	Denmark, France, United States, Switzerland, Netherlands	Arte
A Woman Was Killed.	En nu is ze dood.	Nahid Shaikh, Phara de Aguirre	Belgium	VRT

=== Rendez-Vous ===
Title	Original title	Creator(s)	Production countrie(s)	Network
Blue Gold	L'or bleu	Marie-Anne Le Pezennec, Ludovic Lacroix	France	France Télévisions
The Broos	Les groos	David Mirailles	France	Arte
Chamouxland: The Reconstruction	Chamouxland: La reconstruction	Camille Chamoux	France	Canal+
Deep		Aurélien Molas	France	Ciné+ OCS
F*cking Night!	P*tain de soirée	Roman Doduik, Quentin Pissot	France	France Télévisions
Minimum Security	Surveillant!	John Wax, Gauthier Planquaert	France	Disney+
The Persuaders! (1971–72)		Brian Clemens	United Kingdom	ITV
Platini		François Benichou, Laurent Armillei, Guillaume Priou	France	Canal+
The Red and the Black	Le Rouge et le Noir	Georges-Marc Benamou	France	France Télévisions
Solo at Sea: The Vendée Globe Sailing Race	Vendée Globe, seuls autour du monde	Myriam Weil, Ève Pajot-Brémond, Alexandre Soullier	France	France Télévisions
This Is Not a Murder Mystery		Christophe Dirickx, Paul Baeten	Belgium	VRT
Totally Spies! (season 8)		Vincent Chalvon-Demersay, David Michel	France	Gulli
Vigilantes (season 2)	Brigade anonyme	Cécile Berger, Blanche Bigot, Florian Spitzer	France	M6
Zodiaque		Franck Ollivier, Malina Detcheva	France	TF1

=== Korean Fiction ===
Title	Original title	Creator(s)	Production countrie(s)	Network
All the Things You Are	당신의 모든 것	Lee Seung-moo, Choi Yong-bae, Kim Soon-mo	South Korea	
Genfluencer	젠플루언서	Harry Hyun	South Korea	MooAm
Sacred Jewel	신의 구슬	Jung Hyun-min, Jung Dae-yoon	South Korea	JTBC, Prime Video, Coupang Play

== Awards ==
The following awards were presented at the festival:

- Best Series: Alice and Steve by Sophie Goodhart (Disney+)
- Best Performance: Roosa Söderholm for Guts (Yle)
- Best Screenplay: Marta Bassols, Marta Loza, and Almudena Monzú for I Always Sometimes (Movistar Plus+)
- Special Interpretation Award: Ensemble cast of Alice and Steve (Disney+)
- Best Music: Jonas Wikstrand for Summer of 1985 (SVT)
- Student Award – Best Series: Alice and Steve by Sophie Goodhart (Disney+)
- Best Short Form Series: Boho by Abbie Boutkabout (Streamz)
- High School Award – Short Form Series: Sheep by Alex Reinberg and Leni Gruber (ZDF / ORF)
- Best Docuseries: The Deal with Iran by Lennart Stuyck and Maarten Stuyck (VRT Canvas)
- Europa 1 Audience Award: Empathy by Florence Longpré (Crave)
- AirFrance Travelers' Choice Award: The Corsican Line by Pierre Leccia (Canal+)
