= Philip Arditti =

British actor

- Born: Philip Ishak Arditti; 1979 (age 46–47)
- Occupation: Actor

Philip Ishak Arditti (born 1979) is a Swiss-born British-Turkish theatre and television actor famous for his role as Uday Hussein in the four episode House of Saddam television docudrama. He also appeared in the film Red 2, a sequel to 2010's Red. He was part of the team that founded the Arcola Theatre in London.

== Early years ==
Arditti was born in 1979 of Turkish Jewish Sephardic descent, and grew up in Istanbul and moved to London in 1999. He graduated from the Royal Academy of Dramatic Art in 2004.

== Career ==
He began his TV and film career in some of British television's most popular series including Casualty, Spooks and Silent Witness. He also appeared in the British comedy drama film Happy-Go-Lucky.

His radio plays include Snow (adapted from the novel by Orhan Pamuk) and

In 2013, he appeared in Turkish television series Son and in the film Singing Women directed by Turkish film director Reha Erdem. In 2014 he appeared in the BBC/Sundance TV drama The Honourable Woman directed by Hugo Blick opposite Maggie Gyllenhaal where he played Saleh Al-Zahid.

In 2014, he played a goatherd in the Game of Thrones episode, The Laws of Gods and Men.

On the stage Arditti played Yossarian, the New York bomb aimer, in Joseph Heller's stage adaptation of his novel Catch-22 on a UK national tour directed by Rachel Chavkin.He is a regular performer at London's National Theatre, including roles in England People Very Nice (2009), Blood and Gifts (2010), Holy Rosenbergs (2011). In September 2017 he played Uri Savir in J.T. Rogers's stage play Oslo at the venue's Lyttelton auditorium, accompanying the production when it transferred to the West End in the following month.

== Filmography ==
Key
†	Denotes productions that have not yet been released

=== Film ===
Year	Title	Role	Notes
2005	Chopratown	Ozdemir Ergun	TV film
2006	Chicken Soup	Khal	Short film
2006	Really	Izzy	
2008	Happy-Go-Lucky	Flamenco Student	
2009	Vidiotic	Various	TV film
2010	Brotherhood	Rafiq	Short film
2011	Women and Children	Chris	
2012	John Carter	Spotter #2	
2012	Interview with a Hitman	Kovacs	
2013	Red 2	Arman	
2013	Şarkı Söyleyen Kadınlar	Adem	
2013	Leave to Remain	Iranian Psychiatrist	
2013	The Vatican	Stefano Quadraggio	TV film
2014	Born of War	Khalid	
2014	Monsters: Dark Continent	Khalil	
2014	Exodus: Gods and Kings	Viceroy Hegep's Aide	
2015	The Danish Girl	Dr. McBride	
2015	National Theatre Live: As You Like It	Oliver	
2016	Inferno	Professor (Istanbul)	
2016	Arrivals	Mehdi	
2017	National Theatre Live: Salome	Caiaphus	
2017	Anchor and Hope	Farid	
2018	Arabian Nights		Direct-to-video
2018	The Jump	Young Michael	Short film
2019	Strange Cities Are Familiar	Moataz	Short film
TBC	The Way of the Wind†	Hosea	Post-production

=== Television ===
Year	Title	Role	Notes
2004	Casualty	Nikos Siranidis	Episode: "Who Knows Best"
2005	Spooks	Louis Khurvin	Episode: "The Sting"
2006	Caerdydd	Arun	
2007	The Whistleblowers	Mehmet Kunac	Episode: "Fit for Purpose"
2008	10 Days to War	Haidar	Episode: "Blowback"
2008	House of Saddam	Uday Hussein	Miniseries, 4 episodes
2008	Spooks: Code 9	Abid Malik	2 episodes
2008	Silent Witness	Melik Burak	Episode: "Terror"
2009	Father & Son	Suliman	Miniseries, 3 episodes
2010	Five Days	Dr. Adel Haydar	Recurring role, 3 episodes
2010	Accused	Hamid	Episode: "Frankie's Story"
2010	Any Human Heart	Senor Fernandez	Episode: "Series 1, Episode 2"
2012	Above Suspicion	George Peroz	Episode: "Silent Scream"
2012	Twenty Twelve	Saleem Ahmed	Episode: "Boycott"
2012	New Tricks	Mehtin Topal	Episode: "Dead Poets"
2012	Son	Majid Maleki	Series regular, 25 episodes
2013	Borgia	Kasim Bey	Episode: "The Time of Sweet Desires"
2013	Da Vinci's Demons	King Ferdinand	Episode: "The Tower"
2013	Strike Back	Qassein	Recurring role, 3 episodes
2014	Game of Thrones	Goatherd	Episode: "The Laws of Gods and Men"
2014	The Honourable Woman	Saleh Al-Zahid	Series regular, 7 episodes
2014	Ripper Street	Ezra Marvell	Episode: "Ashes and Diamonds"
2015	Spotless	Veysel	Episodes: "The Power of No" & "Fallowfield"
2015	Humans	Salim Sadik	Episode: "Series 1, Episode 1"
2015	Tyrant		Episodes: "Desert Storm" & "Pax Abuddin"
2016	The Missing	Khamis	Episode: "The Turtle and the Stick"
2017	Vera	John Greenhill	Episode: "Broken Promise"
2017	The White Princess	Rodrigo de Puebla	Miniseries, 2 episodes
2018	Kiss Me First	Azul	Miniseries, 5 episodes
2018	Patrick Melrose	Pierre	Episode: "Bad News"
2018	Black Earth Rising	Colonel Colbert	Episodes: "In Other News" & "The Forgiving Earth"
2019	Chimerica	Young Frank	Episode: "Kodak Ergo Sum"
2019	Sanctuary	Dr. Silva	Series regular, 7 episodes
2021	Domina	Primus	Episodes: "Treason" & "Happiness"
2022	No Return	Rico Karvalci	Series regular, 3 episodes
2024	Breathtaking	Dr Metin Ozkul	Miniseries, 3 episodes
2024	The Day of the Jackal	Cenk	Episode: "Episode #1.8"
2024	Protection	Yaran Nouri	Episode: "Conspiracy"

=== Theatre ===
Year	Title	Role	Venue	Notes
2009	England People Very Nice	Elmar	Royal National Theatre, London	
2009	Rope	Sabot	Almeida Theatre, London	
2010	Light Shining in Buckinghamshire	Star	Arcola Theatre, London	
2010	Blood and Gifts	Saeed	Royal National Theatre, London	
2011	The Holy Rosenbergs	Simon	Royal National Theatre, London	
2011	Sixty-Six Books: The Strange Wife	Hannah	Bush Theatre, London	
2013	Facts	Khalid	Finborough Theatre, London	
2014	Catch-22	Yossarian	Northern Stage, Newcastle upon Tyne	
2015	Who Cares	Jonathon	Royal Court Theatre, London	
2015	As You Like It	Oliver de Boys	Royal National Theatre, London	
2016	Henry V	Ancient Pistol	Regent's Park Open Air Theatre, London	
2017	The Hunting Lodge	Prince	Unicorn Theatre, London	
2017	Salomé	Caiaphas	Royal National Theatre, London	
2017	Oslo	Uri Savir	Royal National Theatre, London	
2019	Richard III	Ensemble	Shakespeare's Globe, London	
2019	Henry VI	Ensemble	Shakespeare's Globe, London	
2019	Henry V	Ensemble	Shakespeare's Globe, London	
2019	Henry IV	Ensemble	Shakespeare's Globe, London	
2021	Copenhagen	Werner Heisenberg	Theatre Royal, Bath	
2022	English Kings Killing Foreigners	Various characters	Soho Theatre, London	Inspired by Henry V

=== Video game ===
Year	Title	Role	Notes
2026	Directive 8020	Josef Cernan	Voice

=== Audiobook ===
Year	Title	Role	Notes
2025	Harry Potter and the Philosopher's Stone	Book about Nicolas Flamel	Voice
2025	Harry Potter and the Chamber of Secrets	Aragog	Voice
2026	Harry Potter and the Prisoner of Azkaban	Diner 2	Voice
2026	Harry Potter and the Goblet of Fire	Ministry Wizard 1	Voice
2026	Harry Potter and the Order of the Phoenix	Stone Gargoyle 1 Grey Centaur	Voice
2026	Harry Potter and the Half-Blood Prince	Caractacus Burke	Voice
