= Anansi Boys (TV series) =

Television series

- Promotional poster
- Created by: Neil Gaiman
- Based on: Anansi Boys by Neil Gaiman
- Written by: Neil Gaiman; Lenny Henry; Arvind Ethan David; Kara Smith; Racheal Ofori
- Starring: Malachi Kirby; Delroy Lindo; Amarah-Jae St. Aubyn; Grace Saif
- Country of origin: United Kingdom
- Original language: English

Production
- Executive producers: Neil Gaiman; Douglas Mackinnon; Lenny Henry; Hanelle Culpepper; Hilary Bevan Jones; Richard Fee
- Cinematography: John Lee
- Production companies: The Blank Corporation; Endor Productions; Red Production Company; Amazon MGM Studios

Original release
- Network: Prime Video

Anansi Boys is an unreleased British fantasy miniseries created by Neil Gaiman, based on his 2005 novel of the same name. The series follows the two sons of the spider-god Anansi. The series was set to be released on Amazon Prime Video.

== Cast ==
- Malachi Kirby as Charlie Nancy / Spider
- Delroy Lindo as Mr Nancy
- Amarah-Jae St. Aubyn as Rosie Noah
- Grace Saif as Daisy Day
- CCH Pounder as Mrs Higgler
- Fiona Shaw as Maeve Livingstone
- Jason Watkins as Grahame Coats
- L. Scott Caldwell as Mrs Dunwiddy
- Joy Richardson as Mrs Bustamonte
- Lachele Carl as Miss Noles
- Whoopi Goldberg as Bird Woman
- Hakeem Kae-Kazim as Tiger
- Emmanuel Ighodaro as Lion
- Cecilia Noble as Elephant
- Ayanna Witter-Johnson as Snake
- Don Gilet as Monkey
- Yvonne Mai as Kayla

== Episodes ==
The first and sixth episodes are written by Gaiman.

== Production ==
=== Development ===
In 2014, it was reported a BBC television miniseries of Anansi Boys was in the works. It would be made by Red Production Company with Gaiman as executive producer. The project did not come into fruition, and elements of it were instead incorporated into the Starz adaptation of American Gods.

In May 2020, it was reported that a miniseries adaptation was in development by Endor Productions for Amazon Prime Video. It is a standalone story and not a spin off of American Gods. In July 2021, it was announced Amazon had given the production a series order of 6 episodes. Amazon Studios, The Black Corporation, and Endor Productions are attached to the project; Red Production Company has on stayed to co-produce as well.

Gaiman is the series' showrunner and executive producer. Douglas Mackinnon previously served as co-showrunner, but left the project in November 2022. Gaiman is writing the series with Lenny Henry, who is also executive producing. (Henry previously read the audiobook of the novel Anansi Boys.) Arvind Ethan David, Kara Smith, and Racheal Ofori complete the writers' room. Other executive producers include Hanelle Culpepper, Hilary Bevan Jones of Endor, and Richard Fee of Red.

=== Casting ===
The same month as the greenlight, it was revealed Delroy Lindo would star as Mr Nancy. In September, it was announced Malachi Kirby would star as both of Mr Nancy's sons, Fat Charlie and Spider. Amarah-Jae St. Aubyn and Grace Saif were cast as the female leads Rosie Noah and Daisy Day respectively, as revealed in December.

Casting additions in March 2022 saw Fiona Shaw, CCH Pounder, Jason Watkins, L. Scott Caldwell, Joy Richardson, and Lachele Carl. In April 2022, it was announced Whoopi Goldberg, Hakeem Kae-Kazim, Emmanuel Ighodaro, Cecilia Noble, Ayanna Witter-Johnson and Don Gilet had also joined the cast.

=== Filming ===
Principal photography began on 18 November 2021 at First Stage Studios in Edinburgh, Scotland. The production received support from Screen Scotland. In June 2022, Gaiman shared an update on Twitter, confirming principal photography had wrapped at the end of May and informing fans that post-production would take time.

Following sexual misconduct allegations against Gaiman, Lindo said in April 2025 that he did not believe the show "[would] ever see the light of day".
