= Amarah-Jae St. Aubyn =

English actress (born 1994)

- Born: 1994 (age 31–32); London, England
- Education: Italia Conti Academy of Theatre Arts, BRIT School, Identity School of Acting
- Occupation: Actress
- Years active: 2018–present
- Known for: Lovers Rock

Amarah-Jae St. Aubyn is an English actress known for playing the lead role in the 2020 movie Lovers Rock. She was named one of the 2020 Screen International Stars of Tomorrow.

== Early life ==
St. Aubyn was born in London, England to Jamaican-Cuban and Guyanese parents and grew-up in south east London. Her father was a reggae musician.

== Acting ==
St. Aubyn attended the Italia Conti Academy of Theatre Arts in East London. She graduated from the BRIT School in Croydon, where she took an acting foundation course, in 2012. After a break spent in the hospitality industry, she attended the Identity School of Acting. She would go on to take a 9-month intense training course at the National Youth Theatre Rep.

During the National Youth Theatre course in 2017 St. Aubyn participated in the productions of Othello and Jekyll and Hyde. In 2018, St. Aubyn joined the London cast of the play Harry Potter and the Cursed Child as an understudy. St. Aubyn's first onscreen role came in 2020 with the film Lovers Rock where she starred as Martha Trenton, playing alongside Micheal Ward as Franklyn Cooper.

In 2022, St. Aubyn starred in the ITVX drama The Confessions of Frannie Langton, an adaption of the Sara Collins novel. The series follows a Jamaican woman called Frannie who arrives in London to work in the house of a wealthy couple and has an interracial lesbian romance with the lady of the house. St. Aubyn played Sal, the close friend of Frannie. St. Aubyn was then cast as Rosie Noah in Amazon MGM Studio’s upcoming series Anansi Boys, an adaption of the Neil Gaiman novel. She has also performed in short films, such as The Call.

St. Aubyn narrated stories in the audiobook edition of What We're Told Not to Talk About (But We're Going to Anyway) by Nimko Ali, which tells the stories of 14 women from 42 countries.

== Reception ==
Awards Daily described her as a "breakout star" for her role in Lovers Rock, writing "breakout star Amarah-Jae St. Aubyn celebrates the film's themes of love and determination. With her strong presence on screen, it’s astonishing to learn that this is St. Aubyn's screen debut. The Lovers Rock director, Steve McQueen said "There is a brightness and freshness about Amarah, an optimism which just reflects on the screen. Astonishingly, Small Axe was her first time on camera. She is what you call a star."

== Filmography ==
Year	Title	Role	Notes
2020	Small Axe	Martha Trenton	Anthology: Lovers Rock
2022	The Silent Twins	Greta Gibbons	Film
2022	The Confessions of Frannie Langton	Sal	
2023	The Call	Athena	Short
2024	The Tobacconist	Shauna	Short
TBC	Anansi Boys	Rosie Noah	Upcoming

== Awards and nominations ==
Year	Award	Category	Work	Result
2021	Black Reel Award for Television	Outstanding Supporting Actress, TV Movie or Limited Series	Small Axe	Nominated
2021	Broadcasting Press Guild Awards	Breakthrough Award	Small Axe	Nominated
