= The English (TV series) =

Western drama television series

- Genre: Drama; Revisionist Western
- Written by: Hugo Blick
- Directed by: Hugo Blick
- Starring: Emily Blunt; Chaske Spencer; Ciarán Hinds; Toby Jones
- Music by: Federico Jusid
- Countries of origin: United Kingdom; United States
- Original language: English
- No. of episodes: 6

Production
- Executive producers: Greg Brenman; Hugo Blick; Emily Blunt; Mona Qureshi
- Producer: Colin Wratten
- Cinematography: Arnau Valls Colomer
- Production companies: Drama Republic; Eight Rooks; Amazon Studios; BBC Studios

Original release
- Network: BBC Two (United Kingdom); Amazon Prime Video (United States)
- Release: 10 November – 15 December 2022

The English is a revisionist Western television miniseries written and directed by Hugo Blick, and produced by Drama Republic and Eight Rooks for the BBC and Amazon Prime. Starring Emily Blunt and Chaske Spencer, it follows an Englishwoman who travels to the American West in 1890 to seek revenge on the man she blames for the death of her son. It premiered in the United Kingdom on BBC Two and BBC iPlayer on 10 November 2022, and in the United States on Amazon Prime Video on 11 November 2022. The series received positive reviews from critics, particularly for Blunt's and Spencer's performances.

== Plot ==
Englishwoman Lady Cornelia Locke comes to the West in 1890 looking for revenge on the man she sees as responsible for the death of her son. She meets Eli Whipp, ex-cavalry scout and member of the Pawnee Nation by birth. Eli is on his way to Nebraska to claim the land he is owed for his service in the US army, despite having been told that the white men will not honour their debt. Cornelia and Eli discover a possible shared history.

== Cast and characters ==
=== Main ===
- Emily Blunt as Lady Cornelia Locke
- Chaske Spencer as Sgt. Eli Whipp / Wounded Wolf
- Ciarán Hinds as Richard M Watts
- Toby Jones as Sebold Cusk

=== Recurring ===
- Rafe Spall as David Melmont
- Tom Hughes as Thomas Trafford
- Stephen Rea as Sheriff Robert Marshall
- Valerie Pachner as Martha Myers
- Malcolm Storry as Red Morgan
- Nichola McAuliffe as Black Eyed Mog
- Cristian Solimeno as Clay Jackson
- Miguel Alvarez as Timothy Flynn
- Steve Wall as Thin 'Kell' Kelly
- Gary Farmer as John Clarke
- Kimberly Norris Guerrero as Katie Clarke
- Tonantzin Carmelo as Touching Ground
- Jon Bermudez as Drew

== Episodes ==
No.	Title	Directed by	Written by	Original release date	UK viewers (millions)
1	"What You Want and What You Need"	Hugo Blick	Hugo Blick	11 November 2022; 10 November 2022 (BBC 2)	3.14
In 1890, a US army patrol in the newly formed Oklahoma Territory kills Running Hawk, a wanted Cheyenne chief. Sergeant Eli Whipp, a Pawnee scout, stops them from killing Running Hawk's family, and retires to claim land in Nebraska he is owed for his military service, despite warnings that he will now be viewed as "one of them". An Englishwoman, Lady Cornelia Locke, arrives at a remote Kansas hotel owned by Mr Watts, who has captured and beaten Whipp. Holding Locke captive, Watts discovers she is travelling with a large amount of money, and intends to kill her on the orders of the powerful man she is pursuing. Whipp is sent away with the coachman, Sebold Cusk, to be framed for Locke's murder, but instead kills a gang of robbers while Cusk is mortally shot. Returning to the hotel, Whipp kills Watts, while Locke helps kill his henchman and explains that she is travelling to Caine County, Wyoming to seek revenge on the man who had killed her son. Convinced that 'magic' has brought them together, Locke persuades Whipp to accompany her part of the way north.
2	"Path of the Dead"	Hugo Blick	Hugo Blick	11 November 2022; 17 November 2022 (BBC 2)	N/A
At the town of Hoxem in Caine County, English rancher Thomas Trafford discovers that his pregnant cattle have been slaughtered. Sheriff Robert Marshall dismisses Trafford's aristocratic background and his suspicions that rival farmers or influential general store owner David Melmont may be responsible. Elsewhere, a trio of outlaws massacre a family of Mennonite settlers before encountering Whipp and Locke. Whipp and one of the outlaws recognise each other as fellow Pawnee soldiers, but the situation escalates when the bandits demand Locke's money; a shootout leaves the outlaws dead, with Locke killing the Pawnee and Whipp the other two. In the Mennonites' wagon, Locke finds a surviving child while Whipp cuts a newborn infant out of the dead mother. They meet a kindly Native couple, John and Katie Clarke, who suggest that the family was part of a caravan of "boomers" headed south. Locke insists on taking the children to the caravan, while Whipp is reluctant and would prefer to keep moving. Whipp waits at the Clarke farm for her return.
3	"Vultures on the Line"	Hugo Blick	Hugo Blick	11 November 2022; 24 November 2022 (BBC 2)	N/A
In Hoxem, farmer Timothy Flynn shoots his wife and then himself. His fellow farmer and former army mate Billy Myers asks Sheriff Marshall if marks were found on the bodies, and Billy's wife Martha confronts Trafford for seizing her unbranded cattle. Learning that Melmont paid for the Flynns' coffins, Marshall discovers their bodies have been dug up, while the Myers' son Jed finds Billy disembowelled and hanged. Locke meets a traveller who is killed by a Native man for trespassing on a burial site, and is nearly targeted by outlaw Black-Eyed Mog and her sons. She reunites the children with the caravan of Mennonites, but realises the Clarkes are not what they seem: they betray passing travellers to outlaws who kill and rob them, disposing of the bodies and taking a share of the loot. Whipp reaches the same conclusion, but is taken prisoner. Locke returns and is forced to stab Katie, before holding John at gunpoint and demanding to know what happened to Whipp; he has been sold to Kills On Water, a Cheyenne chief, who asks him for the truth about the Chalk River massacre.
4	"The Wounded Wolf"	Hugo Blick	Hugo Blick	11 November 2022; 1 December 2022 (BBC 2)	N/A
Fifteen years earlier, Trafford arrives in Wyoming with his brutal and ambitious bookkeeper, David Melmont. They meet Corporal Jerome McClintock and soldiers Flynn and Myers, seeking revenge for the death of Myers's brother at the hands of Running Hawk. Melmont joins them in massacring a Cheyenne settlement at Chalk River with a stolen Gatling gun, while Trafford and Whipp, a member of the soldiers' company, are unable to intervene. Melmont returns to England and lies to Locke, Trafford's fiancée, that it was Trafford who took part in the massacre. He claims that Trafford and the soldiers were found at a brothel, for which the soldiers were dishonorably discharged while Trafford has been imprisoned, awaiting payment of a £2,000 fine. When Melmont comes to collect the money, Locke has received a farewell letter from Trafford revealing the truth, but Melmont rapes her and takes the money, using it to make his fortune in Colorado, while Locke becomes pregnant. In 1890, Kills On Water reveals that his family was killed at Chalk River, and asks Whipp what became of the men responsible.
5	"The Buffalo Gun"	Hugo Blick	Hugo Blick	11 November 2022; 8 December 2022 (BBC 2)	N/A
Kills On Water demands that Whipp kill rival outlaw Black-Eyed Mog. Under the pretense of warning Mog, Locke kills her, earning Whipp's freedom and liberating a Native boy held captive by Mog. In Hoxem, Marshall discovers that Timothy Flynn and Billy Myers had identical markings, and Martha shoots one of her stolen steers in defiance. Whipp and Locke grow closer, and he offers to take her the rest of the way north. Reaching the Wyoming border, they almost consummate their relationship, but Locke abruptly withdraws. The boy is taken by Major MacKay, director of a telegraph company, who "educates" Native children to become servants. Whipp recognises one of MacKay's captives as Touching Ground, Running Hawk's widow, who identifies the boy as her son, White Moon. Whipp and Locke flee with White Moon, but are pinned down by MacKay's long-range buffalo rifle. Touching Ground kills MacKay, sacrificing herself as Whipp fends off their pursuers, but a feverish Locke collapses.
6	"Cherished"	Hugo Blick	Hugo Blick	11 November 2022; 15 December 2022 (BBC 2)	N/A
After an attack by a mysterious hooded rider, Trafford tells Marshall that he branded Flynn and Myers for their crimes, and that Hoxem is built on the graves of the massacre's victims. Returning Martha's cattle, Trafford leaves for Alberta with his herd. Whipp finds a travelling surgeon, Flathead Jackson, and it is revealed that Locke is suffering from syphilis; her son inherited the disease, dying at the age of fourteen. Entrusting White Moon to Jackson's care, Locke and Whipp reach Martha's farm and piece together the truth: Melmont and the soldiers contracted syphilis at the brothel after the massacre; Melmont infected Locke, later forcing himself on Martha and fathering Jed, though both have escaped infection, while emerging symptoms led Flynn to kill his wife and himself. Jed goes after Melmont, while the others are attacked by the hooded rider, a disfigured McClintock, before Whipp kills him. Trafford and his herd are killed in a flash flood, and Locke confronts Melmont, who is shot by Martha and finished off by Whipp with a broken sword. Marshall agrees to conceal what happened, but Whipp and Locke go their separate ways. Thirteen years later, Jackson's Wild West Show arrives in England. Locke, disfigured by syphilis, visits White Moon, who declares he is proud of his heritage. Closing footage shows the 1903 visit of Buffalo Bill's Wild West to England and Wales, and the first known Western, shot in England in 1899, as well as "Melmont's", purporting to be a store trading since 1890.

== Production ==
In February 2020, Emily Blunt joined the cast of the series, with Hugo Blick writing and directing, and Amazon Studios and BBC Studios set to co-produce. In May 2021, Chaske Spencer, Rafe Spall, Toby Jones, Tom Hughes, Stephen Rea, Valerie Pachner, Ciarán Hinds, Malcolm Storry, Steve Wall, Nichola McAuliffe, Sule Rimi and Cristian Solimeno joined the cast.

Principal photography began in Spain in May 2021 and ended in September 2021. It has been filmed in some places of central Spain not far from Madrid, such as El Espinar, Soto del Real and Tembleque.

== Reception ==
The review aggregator website Rotten Tomatoes reports an 82% approval rating and an average rating of 7.7/10, based on 56 reviews. The website's consensus reads: "A visual knockout elevated by Emily Blunt and Chaske Spencer's performances, The English is a heady and somewhat meandering Western made with admirable craft." On Metacritic, it has a weighted average score of 74 out of 100 based on 26 critics, indicating "generally favorable reviews". The Guardian gave it five out of five, stating: "although you might lose track of the details, the plot never becomes impenetrable or the performances less than compelling" citing Spencer and Blunt's performances as "a revelation".

=== Accolades ===
Year	Award	Category	Nominee(s)	Result	Ref.
2023	Screen Actors Guild Awards	Outstanding Performance by a Female Actor in a Television Movie or Limited Series	Emily Blunt	Nominated	
2023	British Academy Television Awards	Best Actor	Chaske Spencer	Nominated	
2023	British Academy Television Craft Awards	Best Director: Fiction	Hugo Blick	Nominated	
2023	British Academy Television Craft Awards	Best Costume Design	Phoebe de Gaye	Won	
2023	British Academy Television Craft Awards	Best Original Music: Fiction	Federico Jusid	Nominated	
2023	British Academy Television Craft Awards	Best Production Design	Chris Roope	Nominated	
2023	Irish Film & Television Awards	Actor – Television Drama	Stephen Rea	Won	
2023	Royal Television Society Programme Awards	Leading Actor: Male	Chaske Spencer	Nominated	

== See also ==
- Jericho, another British Western-style TV series that re-imagines the construction of a railway viaduct in Yorkshire with genre tropes.
