= Ann Hart =

Ann or Anne Hart may refer to:

- Ann Weaver Hart (born 1948), university president of Temple University
- Ann Hart Coulter (born 1961), American lawyer, conservative social and political commentator, author, and syndicated columnist
- Anne Hart (actress) (1933–2023), English actress, dancer, singer and comedian
- Anne Hart (Canadian author) (1935–2019), Canadian author

== See also ==
- Annie Hart (disambiguation)
