= Karla-Simone Spence =

English actor (born 1996)

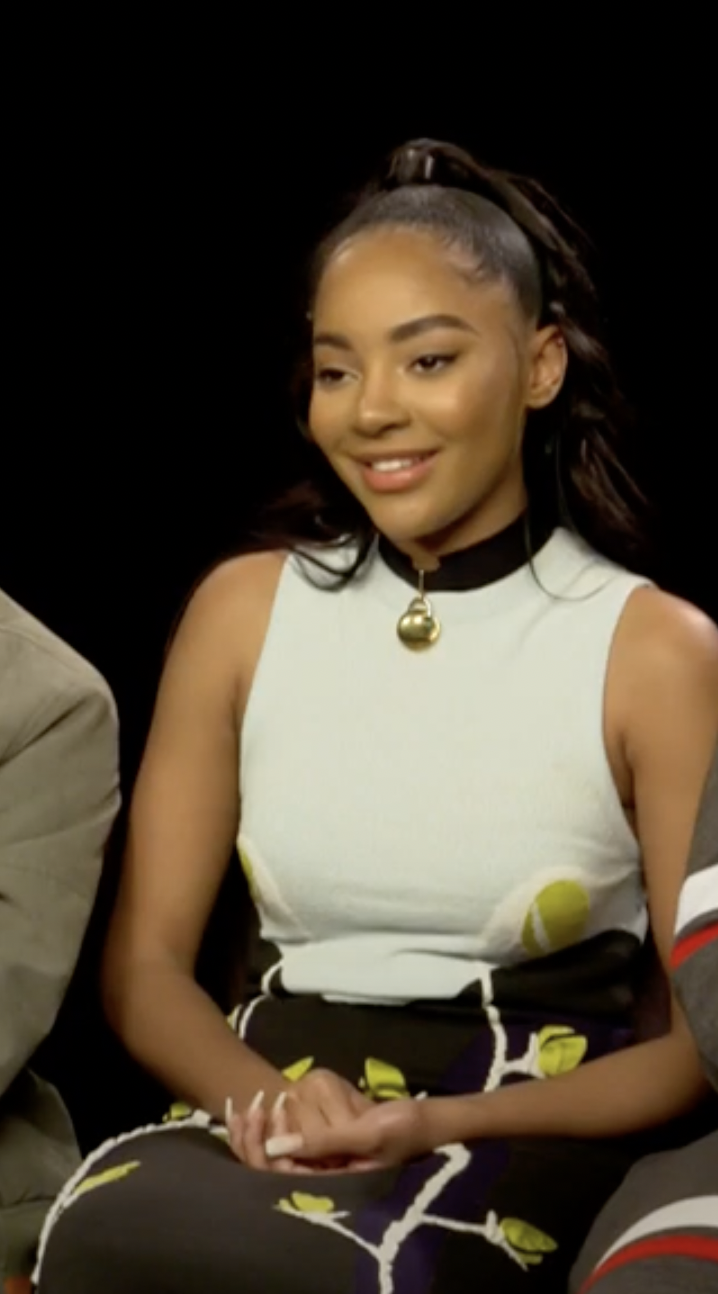
- Spence in 2019
- Born: 19 July 1996 (age 30); Lambeth, London, England
- Occupation: Actor
- Years active: 2016–present
- Family: Djed Spence (brother)

Karla-Simone Spence (born 19 July 1996) is a British actress and voiceover artist. She is best known for her roles in the film Blue Story (2019) and the ITVX period drama The Confessions of Frannie Langton (2022). She also appeared in the BBC series Gold Digger (2019) and Wannabe (2018).

== Early life ==
Spence found her love for acting when she was 11 years old after she starred as Joseph in Joseph And The Amazing Technicolor Dreamcoat in her primary school's production. Spence attended Haberdashers' Hatcham College in New Cross. She is the older sister of England international footballer Djed Spence.

== Career ==
Spence made her television debut in 2018 when she played Amber in the BBC Three short-form sitcom Wannabe. The following year, she starred as Cali Okello in the BBC One miniseries Gold Digger and in that same year she portrayed the leading lady, Leah in the film Blue Story. The film received critical acclaim and earned her nominations at the National Film Awards.

In August 2021, it was announced that Spence would star as the title role of Frannie Langton in the period drama The Confessions of Frannie Langton, an ITV adaptation of the novel of the same name by Sara Collins. The limited series premiered on ITVX in December 2022 and in March 2023 on BritBox and she has received critical acclaim for her performance.

In April 2022, Spence made her professional stage debut in House of Ife at Bush Theatre.

In October 2023 it was announced she was cast in The Count of Monte Cristo alongside Sam Claflin as Haydée.

== Filmography ==
Key
†	Denotes projects that have not yet been released

=== Film ===
Year	Title	Role	Notes	Ref.
2018	Nine Nights	Anna		
2019	Blue Story	Leah		

=== Television ===
Year	Title	Role	Notes	Ref.
2018	Wannabe	Amber	4 episodes	
2019	Gold Digger	Cali Okello	Miniseries; 6 episodes	
2022	The Confessions of Frannie Langton	Frannie Langton	Title role, 4 episodes	
2024	The Count of Monte Cristo	Haydée	3 episodes	

== Stage ==
Year	Title	Role	Notes
2022	House of Ife	Aida	Bush Theatre, London

== Short film ==
Year	Title	Role	Notes
2016	Ghosts in Time	Eve	Short film
2018	Sex Ed	Student	Short film

== Awards and nominations ==
Year	Award	Category	Work	Result	Ref
2020	National Film Awards UK	Best Actress	Blue Story	Nominated	
2020	National Film Awards UK	Best Newcomer	Blue Story	Nominated	
2020	National Film Awards UK	Best Supporting Actress	Blue Story	Nominated	
2024	GLAAD Media Award	Outstanding limited or Anthropology series	The Confessions Of Frannie Langton	Nominated	
