= The Confessions of Frannie Langton (TV series) =

British television series

- Based on: The Confessions of Frannie Langton by Sara Collins
- Written by: Sara Collins
- Directed by: Andrea Harkin
- Country of origin: United Kingdom
- Original language: English
- No. of series: 1
- No. of episodes: 4

Production
- Executive producers: Greg Brenman; Rebecca de Souza; Sara Collins
- Producer: Carol Harding
- Production company: Drama Republic

Original release
- Network: ITV
- Release: 8 December 2022

The Confessions of Frannie Langton is a four-part British period drama television series based on the novel by Sara Collins, adapted by Collins herself and produced by Drama Republic for ITV. It premiered on 8 December 2022 as part of the inaugural slate of dramas on the new ITVX streaming service. In the US, the series premiered on BritBox US on 8 March 2023.

== Cast ==
=== Main ===
- Karla-Simone Spence as Frannie Langton
  - Keira Chansa as Teen Frannie
  - Caelan Best as Young Frannie
- Sophie Cookson as Madame Marguerite Benham
- Stephen Campbell Moore as George Benham
- Patrick Martins as Olaudah "Laddie" Cambridge
- Pooky Quesnel as Linux
- Amarah-Jae St. Aubyn as Sal
- Henry Pettigrew as William Pettigrew
- Jodhi May as Hephzibah "Hep" Elliot
- Steven Mackintosh as John Langton

=== Supporting ===
- Lydia Page as Pru
- Mina Andala as Phibba
- James Alexandrou as Constable Meek
- Lou Broadbent as Miss Bella Langton
- Lauren Conroy as Martha
- T'Shan Williams as Calliope
- Martin Fisher as Sir Percy Benham

== Production ==
=== Development ===
It was announced in August 2020 that ITV had commissioned an adaptation of Collins' novel, marking ITV's first commission from Drama Republic. Collins herself would adapt and executive produce the work alongside Greg Brenman and Rebecca de Souza also executive producing and Carol Harding producing. Andrea Harkin would direct the drama.

=== Casting ===
In August 2021, it was announced Karla-Simone Spence, Sophie Cookson, and Patrick Martins would star in the series with Spence taking the titular role. Stephen Campbell Moore, Steven Mackintosh, and Henry Pettigrew had also joined the cast.

=== Filming ===
Receiving support from Screen Yorkshire and Production Intelligence, filming began in August 2021 and wrapped in November. Markéta Korinkova designed the sets for the series.

Principal photography took place across Yorkshire at locations such as the former post office on Lendal in York, Duncombe Park, Dewsbury Town Hall, South Parade, Wakefield, Dalton Mills, Hull Old Town, Kingston upon Hull, Temple Newsam, Versa Studios in Leeds, York Mansion House, Bramham Park and Sledmere House.

== Reception ==
The series received positive reviews. Karina Adelgaard of Womentainment opined that despite having LGBTQ characters dying – known as the "bury your gays" trope – the "unapologetic" love story, paired with staying true to the time period, makes it work.
