= Patrick Martins =

Irish actor

- Born: 19 May 1997 (age 29); Lagos, Nigeria
- Education: The Lir Academy
- Occupation: Actor
- Years active: 2019–present

Patrick Martins (born 19 May 1997) is an Irish actor. He is known for his stage work and his roles in the Virgin Media One crime drama Redemption (2022) and the ITVX period drama The Confessions of Frannie Langton (2022). His films include Baltimore (2023).

Martins was named a 2023 Screen International Rising Star of Ireland.

== Early life ==
Of Nigerian origin, Martins moved from Lagos to Ireland in 2002 after his parents separated, where he grew up in Swords, a suburb just north of Dublin in Fingal.

Martins attended Fingal Community College. Unsure what to do during his Leaving Cert, his mother suggested he try acting. He took a two-year PLC course with the Bull Alley Theatre Company at Liberties College alongside his good friend Kieran Flynn. He went on to graduate with a Bachelor of Arts in Acting from The Lir Academy at Trinity College Dublin in 2019.

== Career ==
Martins made his television debut as Zac in the RTÉ fantasy comedy Blasts from the Past. Martins received critical acclaim for his breakout stage performance as M'Closky in the 2022 Abbey Theatre production of Branden Jacobs-Jenkins' stage adaptation of An Octoroon. He also appeared in Good Sex at the Dublin Theatre Festival.

Around this time, Martins also appeared in the Virgin Media One crime drama Redemption as DS Luke Byrne. In August 2021, it was announced Martins would star as Olaudah "Laddie" Cambridge in the period drama The Confessions of Frannie Langton, an adaptation of the novel of the same name by Sara Collins. The series premiered on ITVX in December 2022.

== Filmography ==
Year	Title	Role	Notes
2019	Power Out	Rory	Short film
2020	Blasts from the Past	Zac	6 episodes
2022	Redemption	DS Luke Byrne	Supporting role
2022	The Confessions of Frannie Langton	Olaudah "Laddie" Cambridge	Main role
2023	Baltimore	Walter	Feature film
2023	Northern Lights	Gavin	3 episodes
2024	Harry Wild	Emmanuel Okafor	1 episode
2024	The Problem with People	Padraig	Feature film
2024	Conveyance	Brian	Short film
2025	Small Town, Big Story	Jules O'Brien	Supporting role
2025	Cooper and Fry	Lee Bateman	1 episode
2026	Ancestors	Henry	Feature film

== Stage ==
Year	Title	Role	Notes
2019	Much Ado About Nothing	Barachio	Rough Magic; The Quad, Kilkenny / Theatre Royal Waterford
2020	The Great Hunger		Abbey Theatre, Dublin
2022	An Octoroon	M'Closky	Abbey Theatre, Dublin
2022	Good Sex		Dublin Theatre Festival
2024	Emma	Mr. Knightly	Abbey Theatre, Dublin
