= The Keith Barret Show =

- Genre: Comedy
- Starring: Rob Brydon
- Country of origin: United Kingdom
- Original language: English
- No. of series: 2
- No. of episodes: 13

Production
- Running time: 30 minutes

Original release
- Network: BBC Two
- Release: 5 July 2004 – 11 February 2005

Related
- Marion and Geoff

The Keith Barret Show is a spoof BBC chat show hosted by Keith Barret (Rob Brydon) who interviews celebrity couples in the hope of finding the secret to a successful marriage. It was devised by Paul Duddridge and co-written with Rob Brydon. In each programme, there are a selection of clips from venues such as speed dating or interviews with relationship experts.

Rob Brydon's character Keith first appeared on TV in the comedy series Marion and Geoff where, for most of the first series, he was oblivious to the affair between the title characters.

== Episode list ==
=== Series 1 ===
1. Richard Madeley and Judy Finnigan (5 July 2004)
2. Bryan McFadden and Kerry McFadden (12 July 2004)**
3. Ronnie Corbett and Anne Corbett (19 July 2004)
4. Darren Day and Suzanne Shaw (26 July 2004)*, **
5. Lembit Opik and Siân Lloyd (3 August 2004)*, **
6. Tony Wilson and Yvette Livesey (10 August 2004)*

Christmas Special

1. Ulrika Jonsson and Lance Gerrard-Wright (20 December 2004)**

=== Series 2 ===
1. Leslie Ash and Lee Chapman (7 January 2005)
2. Richard Whiteley and Kathryn Apanowicz (14 January 2005)*
3. Justin Ryan and Colin McAllister (21 January 2005)*,***
4. Vinnie Jones and Tanya Jones (28 January 2005)
5. Eamonn Holmes and Ruth Langsford (4 February 2005)*,***,**
6. David Dickinson and Lorne Lesley (11 February 2005)

* unmarried couples ** have since split *** have married since
