= Marion and Geoff =

- Created by: Hugo Blick; Rob Brydon
- Starring: Rob Brydon
- Country of origin: United Kingdom
- Original language: English
- No. of series: 2
- No. of episodes: 17

Production
- Editor: Graham Hodson
- Production company: Baby Cow Productions

Original release
- Network: BBC Two
- Release: 26 September 2000 – 5 March 2003

Related
- The Keith Barret Show

Marion and Geoff is a BBC television mockumentary in video-diary format, produced by Baby Cow Productions and screened on BBC Two in 2000, with a second series following in 2003. The series starred Rob Brydon as Keith Barret, a naïve taxi driver going through a messy divorce from his wife, Marion, who has had a long-standing affair with her colleague, Geoff. Each episode is presented as a monologue, filmed by a fixed camera in the confines of his car.

The series were written by Brydon and Hugo Blick, and produced and directed by Blick. The associate producer was Steve Coogan.

The script is written in such a way that the viewer can pick up on clues that Keith has not himself realised, such as implications that Keith's youngest son is not biologically his.

Keith's character is affectionately portrayed as a gentle dunce and draws a great deal of sympathy as the series progresses. He is in denial about his divorce, and somehow always manages to look on the positive side of even the most awful situation. Although he doesn't understand it, his life revolves around Marion and her new partner Geoff, and his love for his "little smashers" (his sons, Rhys and Alyn). Despite his faults, Keith is a hard-working and good man.

== Series one ==
Series one consists of ten episodes all around nine minutes long. It was first broadcast from 26 September to 28 November 2000 on Tuesday nights at 9:50pm. The series was later repeated, with the original segments combined into 30-minute episodes, though episode 7, "The Monkeys", was not included in this format.

1. "The Presents"
2. "The Gun"
3. "The Homecoming"
4. "The Tunnel"
5. "The Phone"
6. "The Second Hottest Day"
7. "The Monkeys"
8. "The Birthday"
9. "The Divorce"
10. "The Girlfriend"

== Series two ==
Series two consists of six episodes all 30 minutes long. It was first broadcast from 29 January to 5 March 2003 on Wednesday nights at 10pm. In this series, Keith returns to the lives of his sons after a period of estrangement. He now works as a chauffeur for a wealthy American family.

1. "The Services"
2. "The Boys"
3. "The Wife"
4. "The Husband"
5. "Geoff"
6. "Keith"

== Other Keith Barret appearances ==
- Comic Relief Special—a 2001 special eight-minute episode for Comic Relief's Red Nose Day, available on the Marion and Geoff Series 1 DVD.
- A Small Summer Party—a 2001 50-minute special based around Keith's initial discovery of Marion and Geoff's affair, and thus a prequel to the series proper, although produced between the first and second runs. This was the first time on-screen appearance of Geoff and Marion, played by Steve Coogan and Tracy-Ann Oberman respectively. It is available on the Marion and Geoff Series 2 DVD.
- The Keith Barret Show—a 2004 spoof chat/debate show tackling the subject of relationships, hosted by "Keith Barret", who interviewed a different celebrity couple on each show.
