= Annie Hart =

Annie Hart may refer to:

- Annie Hart (Family Affairs), a fictional character in the British soap opera Family Affairs
- Annie Hart (musician), member of the American pop band Au Revoir Simone

== See also ==
- Ann Hart (disambiguation)
