= Malcolm Storry =

English actor

- Born: 13 January 1948 (age 78); Hull, England
- Occupation: Actor
- Years active: 1978–present

Malcolm Storry (born 13 January 1948) is an English actor with extensive experience on stage, television, and film. Amongst many roles, he is perhaps best known for "Yellin" in The Princess Bride, HM Customs Chief Bill Adams on The Knock, and Clive Tishell in Doc Martin.

Storry was born in Hull, East Riding of Yorkshire. He has had an extensive career in theatre, TV, and film, including such roles as Sir Francis Drake in Elizabeth: The Golden Age, Bottom in A Midsummer Night's Dream for the National Theatre, and many roles for the Royal Shakespeare Company including Prospero and Caliban in The Tempest and Macduff and Banquo in Macbeth.

== Selected filmography ==
Year	Title	Role	Notes
1978	The Sailor's Return	Sailor	
1982	Firefox	KGB Agent #2	
1987	The Princess Bride	Yellin	
1987	The Beiderbecke Tapes	Mr Peterson	
1988	Dogfood Dan and the Carmarthen Cowboy	"Dogfood" Dan Milton	
1991	Under Suspicion	Waterston	
1992	The Last of the Mohicans	Phelps	
1994	A Pinch of Snuff	Ray Crabtree	
1995	The Scarlet Letter	Maj. Dunsmuir	
1995	Inspector Morse	DCI Martin Johnson	“The Way Through the Woods” S8:E1
1996	Wycliffe	Bill Hewton	"Faith" S3:E6
1997	The Man Who Knew Too Little	Chief Ins. Cockburn	
2004	The Rocket Post	Captain Kultz	
2001, 2010	Midsomer Murders	Silas Burbage, Joe Megson	“Who Killed Cock Robin?” (2001), “Blood on the Saddle” (2010)
2007	Elizabeth: The Golden Age	Sir Francis Drake	Uncredited
2007	Jekyll	Colonel Hart	TV Mini-Series, Episode: #1.3, #1.5, “Hyde”
2009	Above Suspicion New Tricks	John McDowell Brother Raymond	TV Series, Part 1 & 2 TV Series, Episode: “The War Against Drugs”
2011	Will The Shadow Line	Finch Maurice Crace	TV Mini-Series, 7 episodes
2012	Playhouse Presents	Gardener	TV Series
2014	New Worlds	Adam	TV Mini-Series, 3 episodes
2013–2015	Father Brown	Bishop Talbot	“The Blue Cross”, “The Mystery of the Rosary”, The Deadly Seal”
2016	The Living and the Dead	Gideon Langtree	TV Series, 6 episodes
2017	Darkest Hour	General Ironside	
2015–2017	Doc Martin	Clive Tishell	TV Series, 8 episodes
2019	Temple	Barry	TV Series, Episode #1.1
2022	The English	Red Morgan	
2024	Beyond Paradise	Old Harry	TV Series, Episode #2.4
