= Lovers Rock (2020 film) =

2020 film of Small Axe anthology film series

- Poster for Amazon Prime Video release
- Directed by: Steve McQueen
- Screenplay by: Steve McQueen; Courttia Newland
- Produced by: Anita Overland; Michael Elliott
- Starring: Amarah-Jae St. Aubyn; Micheal Ward
- Cinematography: Shabier Kirchner
- Edited by: Chris Dickens; Steve McQueen
- Music by: Mica Levi
- Production companies: BBC Studios; BBC Films; Turbine Studios; Lamas Park; Amazon Studios; EMU Films; Six Temple Productions
- Distributed by: BBC One; Amazon Prime Video
- Release dates: 24 September 2020 (NYFF); 22 November 2020 (United Kingdom); 27 November 2020 (United States)
- Running time: 68 minutes
- Countries: United Kingdom; United States
- Language: English

Lovers Rock is a 2020 romance film directed by Steve McQueen and co-written by McQueen and Courttia Newland. It stars Micheal Ward and Amarah-Jae St. Aubyn. The film was released as part of the anthology series Small Axe on BBC One on 22 November 2020 and Amazon Prime Video on 27 November 2020. It premiered as an opening film at the 58th New York Film Festival on 24 September 2020.

== Plot ==
Lovers Rock opens by capturing the preparations necessary to turn a typical West London two-story home into the setting for a house party. There is significant commotion: couches and furniture are wrapped and taken outside, rugs are rolled, and individuals complain of heavy lifting. Soon it becomes clear that a party will unfold: reggae is blasted on large speakers rolled in from vans and the kitchen is filled with women singing and prepping food.

8 minutes into the film we are introduced to Martha (played by Amarah-Jae St. Aubyn) as she sneaks out of her second floor window to attend the traditional basement blues party in London. Night falls, and Martha meets up with her friend Patty (played by Shaniqua Okwok) to catch a local bus that will run by the party. The two cheer to "freedom!" and agree that "you just can't wear church shoes to blues dance." The bus is full of people, guests and locals alike, blasting reggae. The excitement is contrasted by a lone man who holds a large, wooden cross outside of the bus window. Martha's smile fades upon seeing him, before she turns her head back to the thrill of the night.

The two girls arrive at the house party and are ushered in by the bouncer while the men behind them are asked to pay a cover charge to enter. The party is in full swing when they enter: guests chatting, reggae blasting and people dancing. Martha and Patty join the buzzing dance floor, filled with men and women alike moving in unison to well known songs and dances.

As the night continues, people ebb and flow through the party. Men and women meet and mingle and Martha is approached by a quiet, young, and intentional man named Franklyn (played by Michael Ward). He moves calmly through the party in contrast to some boisterous friends of his. Martha and Franklyn continue to find each other throughout the night, bumping into each other on the way to the bathroom and flirting in hallways. As the songs chug on and people move outside, the air of the night becomes increasingly intimate; men and women pair up and share private moments to the beat of the music, pressed against the walls of the booming house. The house is a moment tucked away in time, a private reggae filled world of its own.

At some point when the two girls are separated, Patty decides to leave unannounced. This is a pivotal moment as Martha is faced with the autonomy of navigating the rest of her night and foraging connections alone. Upon realizing her departure, Martha runs out the front door calling Patty's name. Now in the street, a group of young white men holler monkey noises at her. It is only a brief moment before the bouncer shoos them off, but it stands in contrast to the fun energy Martha and Patty experienced just moments before together at the party.

An important party scene is captured as the music slows and the DJ leads a group sing-along of Janet Kay's "Silly Games." The energy of the room is brought to life as strangers and friends alike join in to the a cappella. McQueen explains his choice of song, "The song tells the narrative of our two love interests in the picture. It's a beautiful yearning, but also, it’s everyone’s journey. Everybody wants that moment, to be free to be you.”

Tucked into the thrill of the night, a dark vulnerable moment emerges. Bammy, a man who forcefully approached Martha at the beginning of the film, has followed another young woman throughout the night and invites her outside. The moment begins as playful, but soon turns aggressive. Martha runs after the woman, recognizing her screams for help, and with Franklyn's aid, intervenes, pulling the girl away. The moment of tension sharply contrasts the warmth of the music still flowing out of the glowing full house's open windows.

Later in the night, Martha's cousin unexpectedly arrives at the party, trying to insist that it is too late and they must return home. Their disagreement escalates as Martha refuses and tries to reclaims her independence from him. Other guests get involved and ultimately dismiss him from the party, allowing Martha to resume her night.

As dawn breaks, Martha and Franklyn tandem bike through the quiet morning streets. They stop briefly at Franklyn's repair shop, sharing a passionate kiss before an interruption from his boss. He reprimands Franklyn, "Frank, this isn't a knocking shop. You do not bring your Doris in here," British slang for a woman, and drawing attention to Martha's out-of-place presence. The two part ways and on "scouts honor" they promise to call that night. On her journey home, Martha again sees the man with the large, wooden cross.

Martha returns home the same way she left, sneaking through her bedroom window alone 12 hours later. As she crawls through, dropping her dancing shoes on the wooden floor, the morning sunlight illuminates the nailed cross on her wall, bringing the night to a close. Moments after she is safely returned to bed, her mother pounds on her door to awaken her for church. The party has come to an end and its guests must return to reality.

== Cast ==
- Micheal Ward as Franklyn Cooper
- Amarah-Jae St. Aubyn as Martha Trenton
- Kedar Williams-Stirling as Clifton
- Shaniqua Okwok as Patty
- Ellis George as Cynthia
- Francis Lovehall as Reggie
- Daniel Francis-Swaby as Bammy
- Alexander James-Blake as Parker B
- Kadeem Ramsay as Samson
- Romario Simpson as Lizard
- Jermaine Freeman as Skinner
- Marcus Fraser as Jabba
- Saffron Coomber as Grace
- Frankie Fox as Eddie Marks
- Dennis Bovell as Milton

== Release ==
The film was selected for the 2020 Cannes Film Festival alongside Mangrove, but the Festival was canceled due to the COVID-19 pandemic. The film later premiered at the 2020 New York Film Festival, which was held virtually, alongside Mangrove and Red, White and Blue. It screened at the 64th BFI London Film Festival on 18 October 2020. It premiered on BBC One and became available for streaming on BBC iPlayer in the United Kingdom on 15 November 2020, and became available for streaming on Amazon Prime Video in the United States on 20 November.

== Themes ==
"Lovers rock" was the name of a musical genre popular around the mid-1970s in London, but its influences were transatlantic, as were its reaches. The film is named after the genre and plays some of the most popular songs throughout the movie, such as "Silly Games" by Janet Kay. The genre, which coupled the heavy reggae basslines popular in Jamaican music and the soft-soul vocal harmonies originating in Chicago and Philadelphia's R&B scenes, forged unique spaces of freedom common in young Black people of the time whose families were immigrants. This musical influence across space and between diaspora communities represented what Paul Gilroy theorized as the "Black Atlantic", a culture that exists outside of nation-state boundaries.

== Critical response ==
Review aggregator Metacritic assigned the film a weighted average score of 95 out of 100, based on 27 critics, indicating "universal acclaim". On Rotten Tomatoes the film holds an approval rating of 98% based on 133 reviews, with an average rating of 8.9/10. The site's critics consensus reads, "A singular viewing experience that perfectly captures a moment in time, Lovers Rock is a lovingly-crafted ode to Black joy." The entire Small Axe anthology was nominated for Best Miniseries or Television Film at the 78th Golden Globe Awards.

Angelica Bastién of Vulture.com called Lovers Rock "undoubtedly one of the best movies of the year...a transfixing romance not just between the two characters at its center but one about the beauty of the human body, the succor of an energetic party, and the possibility in the hush of a night."

The film appeared on several critics' top ten lists of best films from 2020. In June 2025, IndieWire ranked the film at number 6 on its list of "The 100 Best Movies of the 2020s (So Far)."
