= The Shadow Line (TV series) =

British television series

- Chiwetel Ejiofor and Christopher Eccleston
- Genre: Drama
- Created by: Hugo Blick
- Written by: Hugo Blick
- Directed by: Hugo Blick
- Starring: Chiwetel Ejiofor; Christopher Eccleston; Rafe Spall; Lesley Sharp; Antony Sher; Stephen Rea; Richard Lintern; Kierston Wareing
- Theme music composer: Emily Barker
- Opening theme: Pause
- Ending theme: Pause
- Country of origin: United Kingdom
- Original language: English
- No. of series: 1
- No. of episodes: 7

Production
- Executive producers: Polly Hill (for BBC); George Faber; Charles Pattinson; Henry Normal; Lindsay Hughes; Marc Samuelson; Steve Christian
- Producers: Johann Knobel; Hugo Blick
- Production locations: Isle of Man; London
- Running time: 60 minutes
- Production companies: Company Pictures; Eight Rooks Ltd; Baby Cow Productions; CinemaNX; Isle of Man Film

Original release
- Network: BBC
- Release: 5 May – 16 June 2011

The Shadow Line is a seven-part British television crime drama produced by Company Pictures/Eight Rooks Ltd/Baby Cow/CinemaNX production for BBC Two. It stars Chiwetel Ejiofor, Christopher Eccleston, Rafe Spall, Lesley Sharp, Kierston Wareing, Antony Sher and Stephen Rea. The series was written, directed and produced by Hugo Blick.

The first episode was screened on 12 April 2011 at BAFTA's Princess Anne Theatre in Piccadilly, and was followed by a special question and answer session with Hugo Blick and Christopher Eccleston.

Broadcasting of the series started on 5 May 2011 and finished on 16 June 2011. It is currently available on Blu-ray and DVD and for purchase on Amazon Prime.

== Synopsis ==
The Shadow Line is about a murder investigation that is investigated by two teams, which are the police and criminals, and the different methods they use to attempt to solve the case. The real plot comes with the morality within each character and how they would go before crossing it. It's also about a secret that should not be revealed.

== Production ==
The series is produced by Company Pictures/Eight Rooks Ltd/Baby Cow/CinemaNX/Isle of Man Film for BBC Two. It was mainly shot in the Isle of Man, with some sequences filmed in London.

== Music ==
The theme music is an adapted version of the song "Pause" written by Emily Barker and performed by Emily Barker & The Red Clay Halo, and made to fit the title sequence scored by Martin Phipps, designed by Peter Anderson Studio

== Cast ==
- Chiwetel Ejiofor as Detective Inspector (DI) Jonah Gabriel: Amnesiac detective with a bullet in his head who leads the investigation into Harvey Wratten's death.
- Christopher Eccleston as Joseph Bede: Organised consultant for Harvey Wratten's empire. He has set up a florist business as a front for the drug dealing organisation.
- Antony Sher as Peter Glickman: Wratten's former partner; now on the run.
- Stephen Rea as Gatehouse: Elusive primary antagonist notable for his mannerly persuasiveness. Despite handling large sums of cash he is not driven by financial gain but by "control" alone.
- Rafe Spall as Jay Wratten: Psychotic nephew of Harvey Wratten; eager to find his killer.
- Kierston Wareing as Detective Sergeant (DS) Lia Honey: Gabriel's detective partner.
- Richard Lintern as Detective Chief Superintendent (DCS) Richard Patterson: Gabriel's chain-smoking superior; wanted Gabriel take charge of the Wratten case personally.
- Eve Best as Petra Mayler: Peter Glickman's former mistress.
- Lesley Sharp as Julie Bede: Joseph Bede's wife; suffering from early onset Alzheimer's.
- Tobias Menzies as Ross McGovern: Persistent journalist who is getting too close to the truth.
- Robert Pugh as Bob Harris: Harvey Wratten's business rival; now working with Joseph Bede.
- Malcolm Storry as Maurice Crace: Joseph Bede's right-hand-man and veteran associate of the Wratten empire.
- Clare Calbraith as Laura Gabriel: Jonah Gabriel's wife.
- Sean Gilder as Robert Beatty: Customs officer who has information about Harvey and Jay Wratten's Royal Pardon.
- David Schofield as Sergeant Foley: Gum-chewing corrupt police officer whose loyalties aren't clear.
- Stanley Townsend as Bulkat Babur: Turkish heroin supplier who sets up Joseph's last deal.
- Ace Bhatti as Commander David Khokar: Patterson and Gabriel's commanding officer.
- Sasha Behar as Laing: Senior customs officer
- Freddie Fox as Ratallack: Bob Harris' ambitious, wily, young associate.
- Nicholas Jones as Commander Penney: Retired Police Commissioner.
- Sharon D. Clarke as Mrs Dixon: Tortured mother of Andy Dixon.
- Tobi Bakare as Andy Dixon: Driver of Harvey's car the night he was murdered; on the run after witnessing the crime.
- Charles Kay: Former MI5 agent Sir Richard Halton.

== Plot ==
Drugs baron Harvey Wratten and his unstable nephew, Jay (Rafe Spall), are released from prison on a Royal Pardon (which is a rarity). On the drive from prison Harvey is shot execution-style while seated in the back seat of his car. Corrupt copper Sergeant Foley (David Schofield) and his partner find Wratten's body and alert Joseph Bede (Christopher Eccleston), Wratten’s placid and gentle henchman. Jay has already shown his true colours by attacking an associate of Bob Harris’s (Robert Pugh) in a lift for suggesting that they earned their freedom by naming names.

Before his arrest Harvey had Joseph set up a legitimate floral business for a clean "line" to smuggle drugs through. After Harvey is murdered, Joseph discovers that Harvey owed £1,000,000 to a Turkish drugs importer, Bulkat Babur (Stanley Townsend), for the shipment that was seized during his arrest. So Joseph proposes a new deal to the Turk; use his new business to earn enough to cover what is owed plus what he personally invested to start the business and provide care for his rapidly deteriorating wife and then he's out. So Joseph and Babur strike a deal.

The Wratten murder case is given to DI Jonah Gabriel (Chiwetel Ejiofor), who has just returned to work with a bullet lodged in his brain after a bungled undercover job left his partner dead. He has lost all memory of the event. No sooner has the investigation begun than Gabriel finds a case containing hundreds of thousands of pounds hidden in his own home.

Gabriel believes Harvey knew his killer because Wratten had opened the car window. So Gabriel and colleague DS Lia Honey (Kierston Wareing) look for the car driver, petty crook Andy Dixon (Tobi Bakare), to find out what he knows but he is on the run. Jay threatens Andy's mother to find him and then a mysterious man called Gatehouse (Stephen Rea) shows up. His calm, soothing demeanour fools Andy's mother into thinking he can be trusted. After sleeping on the street for a couple of days Andy phones his mother (Sharon D. Clarke) to ask what he should do. She tells him to avoid Jay and the police and she calls Gatehouse. Just as Jay and Gabriel are running toward Andy in the park, Gatehouse calls and instructs him where to go.

Sitting together in his car, Gatehouse persuades Andy Dixon to meet Jay and tell him he "messed up" and that he heard his uncle's killer say "Bob Harris says ‘hello’”. Gatehouse suspects Andy may have seen more and shoots him and his family, making it look as if the young chauffeur has done the deed. Patterson (Richard Lintern), Gabriel's superior, is ready to wrap the case up and call it quits but Gabriel is not convinced the story is legit so Patterson allows him two weeks to solve the case.

During an earlier conversation with another officer, Honey learns that Gabriel didn't register the undercover operation that got him shot and his partner killed. She now has her doubts about Gabriel's reliability and follows him to a house where he is welcomed by a woman who is not his wife (Agni Scott) and a little boy who calls him "Daddy". During that visit the woman repeats her demand that Gabriel tell his pregnant wife, Laura, about her and their son or she will.

Gabriel and Honey stake out Harvey's funeral as a villain named Beatty (Sean Gilder) shows up and expresses his hatred of Harvey to Jay, the only person who came to pay respects. Honey uses this time to confront Gabriel about not registering the operation, which makes it appear as if Gabriel is hiding something; Gabriel can't remember. Just then, the annoying reporter Ross McGovern (Tobias Menzies) shows up and questions why they are there if the case has been closed. Ross, sniffing a story, attempts to chase Beatty on his motorcycle but Gabriel intervenes and breaks the light assembly so he can't pursue. Ironically, Ross soon gets promoted to editor-in-chief and to his dismay, is bluntly told to drop the corruption story and move on. As he rides home to share the good news with his wife, Gatehouse deliberately hits and kills him with his car.

Gabriel gets a surprise visit from Beatty, who turns out to be a customs officer. He tells Gabriel that Harvey earned his pardon for saving his life by alerting police to a car bomb and giving a tip-off about the drug deal. Harvey still has the drugs (hence the rift with Babur, who should have been paid). Beatty also arrests one of Harris's pushers, who names Jay as the informant, which Jay denies.

By studying tube CCTV, Gabriel links the dead Dixon to Gatehouse, who is now in pursuit of Peter Glickman (Antony Sher), a key player in the former drug operation who went into hiding after Harvey's murder. Glickman's son manages to protect his father from Jay and Maurice but after threatening his wife and newborn baby, Gatehouse frightens the son into calling his father. Gatehouse has bugged the son's office and is able to decipher Glickman's phone number and location during the call. Joseph, who is emotionally vulnerable due to his wife's volatile behaviour, has started a brief affair with Petra (Eve Best), Peter Glickman's girlfriend.

Glickman is now living as watch-maker Paul Donnelly in Dublin. Gatehouse arrives at the shop but Glickman is ready for him. During their conversation Glickman detonates a bomb he had installed as a security measure but it fails to kill Gatehouse and both men back off due to the imminent arrival of emergency services. Now back in town, Glickman rings Gabriel and says his dead partner, Delaney, was corrupt; Patterson defends Gabriel's integrity. Glickman meets Joseph and it transpires that Gatehouse had the money for the drugs in the transaction with Babur but Glickman failed to pay up. Harris's boyfriend, Ratallack (Freddie Fox), proposes that he take over the deal with Joseph. Harris is seen as a complication and is assassinated (presumably by Gatehouse).

Glickman meets Gabriel, telling him that Gatehouse will give him the answers he needs but to beware, because Gatehouse will use his "secrets" to hurt him. Gabriel assumes this means his ex-mistress and their son. Glickman also suggests that he visit retired Commander Penney (Nicholas Jones) and ask about "Counterpoint".

Gabriel is soon visited by Gatehouse at Alison's flat. With Gatehouse at the door, in flashbacks, Gabriel remembers that it was Gatehouse who shot Delaney and the bullet that passed through his partner's head lodged into his own. Gatehouse explains that he killed Delaney because he was corrupt and he deliberately spared Gabriel. Gatehouse offers a journal of Delaney's notes as proof (the notebook was blank) but Gabriel astutely observes that Gatehouse is wearing gloves (a sign that an execution was imminent). At that moment Glickman, who has been hiding in the bedroom, jumps out and shoots Gatehouse twice. Unfortunately, Gabriel's son wanders into the crossfire and is struck and killed instantly. In the uproar that follows Glickman leaves without finishing Gatehouse off. Glickman then calls Petra and wants to meet. Inexplicably, she kills him and then attempts to murder Gatehouse in his hospital room but he kills her.

As Gabriel's memory returns he makes inquiries and discovers the money in the briefcase is marked and was actually part of a sting, not a dirty deal. Although Delaney was originally corrupt, Patterson partnered him with Gabriel in hopes that he would stop being dirty (which he did). The operation that night was not logged because corrupt officers (like Foley) might blow the cover. He tells Patterson, who warns him that their superior, Commander Khokar (Ace Bhatti), is not to be trusted. Joseph Bede's henchman, Maurice, tips off Sergeant Foley about Joseph's forthcoming deal with Babur.

Gabriel visits Penney on his boat, who tells him that Counterpoint had originally been set up as a sting to crack down on the laundering of drug money. The operation had been placed under his control, as Commander of the Force and a Secret Service agent named Gatehouse. Money apprehended from the stings was funnelled into the police pension fund. Gatehouse conducted the operation through two underworld bosses named Wratten and Glickman. After Counterpoint's objective had been served Harvey was urged to retire the drug operation but he refused. After relaying all this to Gabriel, Penney, overcome with remorse, kills himself in front of Gabriel. Khokar, who succeeded Penney and Sir Richard Halton (former MI5)want to remove Wratten, Glickman, and Gatehouse. Gatehouse turns the tables and murders Halton at home. When Gabriel and Patterson realise that Khokar sent Petra to kill Glickman and Gatehouse and that he is implicated in the corruption, Khokar is forced to resign.

While in prison Harvey found out about Counterpoint and the true nature of his customer (Gatehouse). He used the information to blackmail the police into enabling him to receive a Royal Pardon. Since such a pardon requires that significant help be given to an official investigation, a scam was devised whereby he appeared to give details leading to a major bust (of his own previously confiscated drugs) and provide information that would save the life of a Customs Officer (from a bomb deliberately placed for that purpose). The pension scheme had since become reliant on this income and the operation was deemed too profitable to close down. Gatehouse killed Wratten to re-start the business with him in charge.

Joseph's wife Julie tries to kill herself by deliberately falling down the stairs. Doctors tell Joseph she will have to go into a home but he refuses. Joseph returns home later to find her gone. She has been hospitalised after slitting her wrists. Joseph visits and tries to comfort her but she pulls away and says, "Let me go". Not meaning, "Let go of my hand". but "Please let me die". Early on, Joseph begins to suspect that Jay would kill him to take over the drug business, so he buys a gun to kill him first. Seeing his wife's blood on the kitchen floor from her suicide attempt makes him realise that he has little to live for now. When Jay comes calling to pick up the money Joseph deliberately leaves the gun and his house keys behind on the table and Jay kills him.

Beatty alerts Gabriel to Joseph's deal with Babur and Ratallack but Gabriel decides to sting the operation with the marked money from the earlier failed sting with Delaney. When Beatty discovers the foil he is furious and beats Sergeant Foley up, as if he is responsible. Soon the phone rings in Gabriel's office and we see him drawing the description of where he is to meet the caller. Gabriel arrives at the remote location to find Khokar hanging by the neck and Gatehouse calmly talking as if nothing has happened. It appears as though he is willing to give Gabriel a chance to walk on the shadow line and ignore what has happened. Gabriel, who has made compromises in his personal life, is unwilling to do so professionally. He has positioned Honey with a rifle above the meeting place so she can kill Gatehouse when he gives the signal. Gatehouse sends a signal and she kills Gabriel instead.

With all the old loose ends tied, Gatehouse is in control of Counterpoint. He tells Jay (now procurement boss) and Ratallack (now sales boss) not to screw up "because you know who you're messing with". They are the (new) threads but he is the rope. Patterson, promoted to Commander, visits Gabriel's widow in the maternity hospital and informs her that Gabriel's newborn son will be well looked after, thanks to a well-funded police pension scheme. The police apparatus, with Honey taking Gabriel's place as Detective Inspector, swallows Gabriel's death and the entire corrupt operation whole, while concocting a Khokar-shot-Gabriel-then-hung-himself narrative for the press and anyone else who asks....

== Reception ==
The first episode received mixed reviews. The plot was praised by James Walton of The Daily Telegraph, who felt the acting to be too restrained. Reviews for the final episode were much more positive. The themes received particular praise. Other reviews noted it to be flamboyant in an almost theatrical sense but ultimately praised the series. The Telegraph continued to negatively review the series, claiming the final episode was too unbelievable to be viewed with sincerity. The series was ranked the second best series of 2011 by television magazine Radio Times. The A.V. Club praised the show, claiming it "really nails the big beats in an effective manner" and expressed admiration for the "thrilling action sequence" that occurred in each episode.

=== Ratings ===
Episode	Air date	Viewers (millions)	Rank
One	5 May	3.4	2
Two	12 May	2.4	4
Three	19 May	2.1	8
Four	26 May	2.1	9
Five	2 June	1.9	17
Six	9 June	1.8	15
Seven	16 June	2.1	14

== Factual basis ==
The method of drug smuggling described in the series reflected that used by the "Flowers Gang".

== International broadcast ==
- In the United States the series was acquired by Audience Network and started airing on 19 February 2012.
- Germany. Broadcasting started at Wednesday, 16 November 2011, 8:15 pm on RTL Crime. The series finale aired on 4 January 2012.
- Denmark. Series was broadcast late Sunday evenings already at autumn of 2011 on the prime national channel (commercial free) DR1. It was also re-aired a year later at the same channel.
- Sweden. Broadcasting started at Friday, 16 March 2012, 10:15 pm at secondary national channel (commercial free) SVT2.
- Australia. Broadcasting started on Friday, 23 March 2012 at 9:30 pm on ABC1, and was re-run starting from September 2014.
- New Zealand. Broadcasting concluded mid March 2012 on SOHO.
- Saudi Arabia and the Middle East. Broadcasting started on Friday, 2 August 2013 on Orbit Showtime Network.
