= Leni Gruber =

Austrian film director and screenwriter

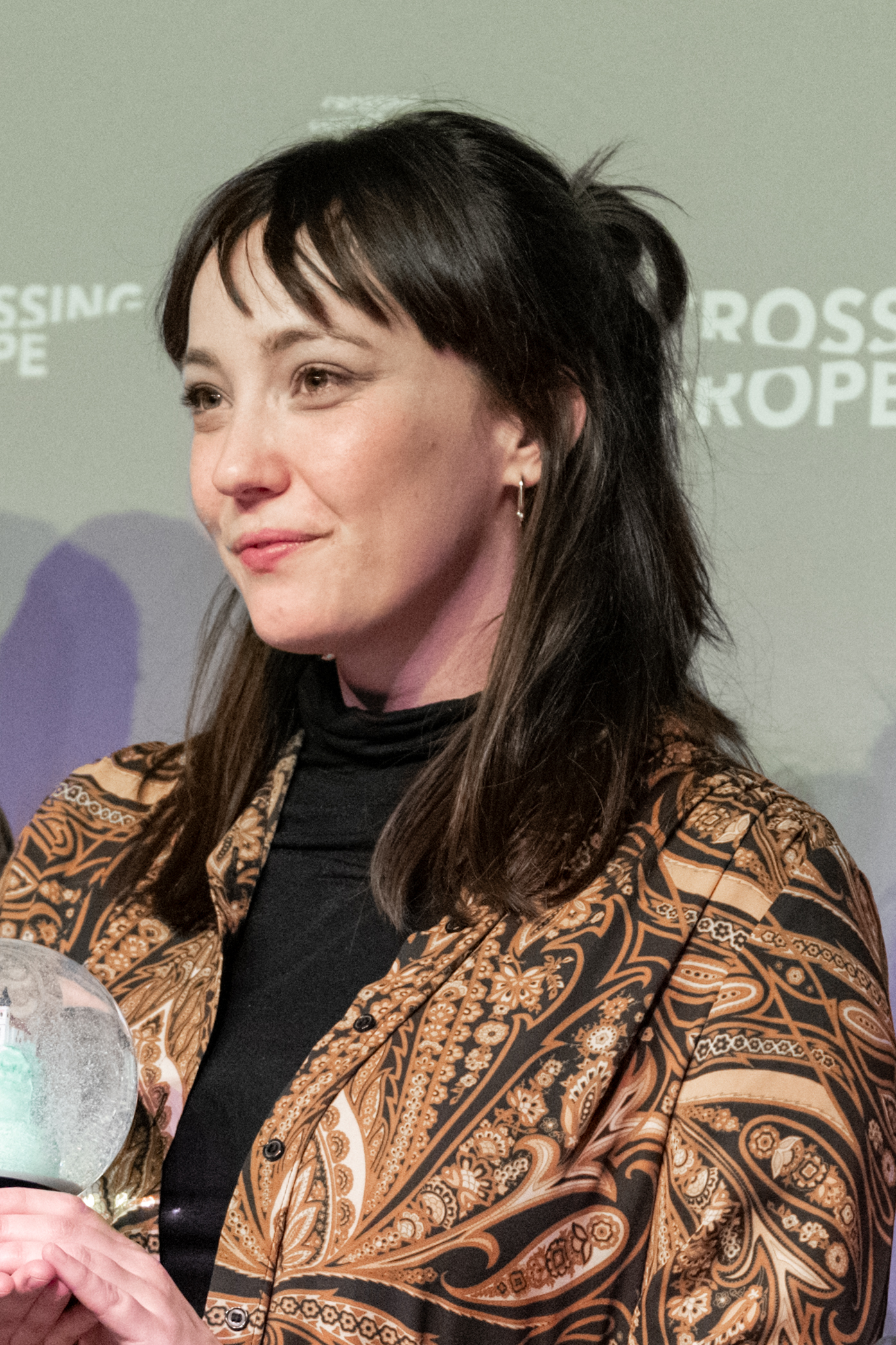
- Leni Gruber (2022)
- Born: 1991 (age 34–35); Wels, Austria
- Education: Film Academy Vienna
- Occupations: Film director, screenwriter
- Notable work: Schneemann, Hollywood
- Awards: Local Artist Award (2018), Best Short Film (2022), Thomas Pluch Screenplay Award (2025)

Leni Gruber (born 1991) is an Austrian film director and screenwriter.

== Life and career ==
Gruber grew up in Wels and became active early in the local cultural scene around the Alter Schlachthof Wels and the Media Culture House. In 2012 she began studying screenwriting & dramaturgy and production at the Film Academy Vienna.

She has made several short films that have screened at national and international festivals, including the Sarajevo Film Festival, Crossing Europe Film Festival Linz, YOUKI and the Max Ophüls Prize Film Festival. Her films often explore everyday realities and are noted for their subtle humour. In interviews, Gruber has described her work as a search for authenticity in both performance and direction.

She has also served as a jury member, including for the short film competition at the Diagonale – Festival of Austrian Film and at the Kürzestfilm Festival.

== Filmography ==
- 2015: ID is no Dream – short film (15 min)
- 2018: Schneemann – short film (20 min)
- 2022: Hollywood – short film, co-directed with Alex Reinberg
- 2026: Sheep – short series (5 episodes, 20min each), co-directed with Alex Reinberg

== Awards ==
- 2018: Local Artist Award, Crossing Europe Film Festival Linz for Schneemann
- 2022: Best Short Film, Kitzbühel Film Festival for Hollywood (with Alex Reinberg)
- 2025: Thomas Pluch Screenplay Award (for a short or medium-length feature film) for Affordable Solutions for a Better Life (with Alex Reinberg)
