= Anne Hart (actress) =

English actress, dancer, singer and comedian (1933–2023)

- Born: Anne Maud Hart; 26 April 1933; Lambeth, London, England
- Died: 5 November 2023 (aged 90); Gullane, East Lothian, Scotland
- Education: Italia Conti Academy of Theatre Arts (BA)
- Occupation: Actress • dancer • singer • comedian
- Years active: 1955–2017
- Spouses: John Padley (m. 1957; div. 1965) Ronnie Corbett (m. 1966; died 2016)
- Children: 3

Anne Maud Corbett (née Hart; 26 April 1933 – 5 November 2023) was an English actress, dancer, singer and comedian. She was the wife of comedian and actor Ronnie Corbett.

Hart, as an actress, was often referred to as Britain's answer to both Hollywood's Jane Russell and Broadway's Ethel Merman.

== Early life ==
Anne Maud Hart was born at St Thomas' Hospital in Lambeth, London, on 26 April 1933, as the third of six children to Doris Emily (née Davis), a housewife, and Marvin Hart, a former light heavyweight boxer. She grew up in South London.

Hart was trained at the Italia Conti Academy of Theatre Arts in London. She later graduated with her Bachelor of Arts (BA) degree.

== Career ==
Hart made her West End debut as a child in the Christmas show Where The Rainbow Ends. She also performed in child roles in operas at Covent Garden.

Hart made her television debut in 1955, at the age of 22, as a regular on Saturday Night at the London Palladium with Tommy Trinder. She made her final television appearance during an episode of The Many Faces of... on 1 January 2016.

Hart made her theatre debut as the leading lady in Clown Jewels in 1959. She also appeared with the comedy troupe The Crazy Gang in Young at Hart in 1962.

Hart made her debut as an actress with the role of a music hall singer during an episode of the 1965 series Sherlock Holmes. She made her final appearance as an actress portraying Stooge during the 1975 production of Max Wall: Funny Man.

Hart retired to look after her family.

== Personal life ==
Hart married the Four Jones Boys singer John H. Padley at the Holy Trinity Church in Wallington, Surrey, on 15 October 1957. The couple divorced in 1965. Hart later said, "John was a nice guy and he was never unkind to me. He was just never there. He would come back from touring, I would iron his shirts and he would leave again. In the end, he moved out of my house and we separated."

Hart married the comedian and actor Ronnie Corbett at Brixton registry office on 30 May 1966. The couple had two daughters, Emma and Sophie. Their first child, Andrew, had a heart defect and died when he was six weeks old, at St Thomas' Hospital, in London. Hart said in 2013, "I don't think either of us ever quite got over it. We still think of him all the time." She had four grandchildren. Hart and Corbett first met in the late 1950s, while she was working as a dancer at Winston's, Hanover Square, a club owned by Danny La Rue, and he was an up-and-coming comedian. The couple were married for 49 years until her husband's death on 31 March 2016. Hart later told the Daily Mail, "There has been an empty feeling since Ron has gone... An emptiness, yes, that's what it is. But I think and hope that I am slowly emerging from the mist."

Hart and Corbett lived in a seven bedroom property named Fairways located in Addington, London, from 1970 to 2003. The couple also owned a Scottish home named Muirfield Wood located in Gullane, East Lothian.

Hart was dyslexic. She suffered with double pneumonia between January and February 2012. She was taken into hospital after suffering a health scare on 18 April 2016, the day of her husband's funeral. She was treated for a hip fracture in the Royal Infirmary of Edinburgh following a fall at Muirfield Wood in the months leading up to her death.

== Death ==
Hart died at Muirfield Wood in the early hours of 5 November 2023, aged 90. Her death was announced to the public the following day in a statement by her youngest daughter Sophie:

"We lost my darling Mum at one o'clock in the morning. She was an amazing woman, and my sister Emma and I, and all four of her grandchildren, Tom, Tilly, Dylan and Billy, will love and miss her for ever. We will be bringing her home to Addington, near Croydon, which is where the family lived when my Dad was alive."

== Filmography ==
=== As herself ===
Year	Title	Notes
1955	Saturday Night at the London Palladium	Regular
1958	Seaside Stars	1 episode
1964	Showstoppers	1 episode
1965, 1971	The Good Old Days	2 episodes
1977	Seaside Special	1 episode
1978	Ronnie Corbett's Sunday Special	1 episode
1983	The Crazy Gang: A Celebration	
1984	This Is Your Life	1 episode
2002	Heroes of Comedy	1 episode
2004	The Keith Barret Show	1 episode
2008	Great British Menu	1 episode
2013	ME1 TV... Danny La Rue tribute	
2013	Ronnie's Animal Crackers	6 episodes
2016	The Many Faces of...	1 episode

=== Theatre ===
Year	Title	Venue
1959	Clown Jewels	Victoria Palace, London
1961	Young In Hart	Victoria Palace, London

=== As an actress ===
Year	Title	Role	Notes
1965	Sherlock Holmes	Music Hall Singer	1 episode
1965	Z Cars	Doreen	1 episode
1965	ITV Play of the Week	Miss. Popolka	1 episode
1965	Hope and Keen		1 episode
1967	Stranger in the House	Barmaid	Uncredited
1969	The Corbett Follies		1 episode
1972	The Two Ronnies	Singing Finale Dancer	1 episode
1975	Max Wall: Funny Man	Stooge	

== Discography ==
- "Music Maestro Please"
