= Ayanna Witter-Johnson =

English composer, singer-songwriter, pianist and cellist (born 1985)

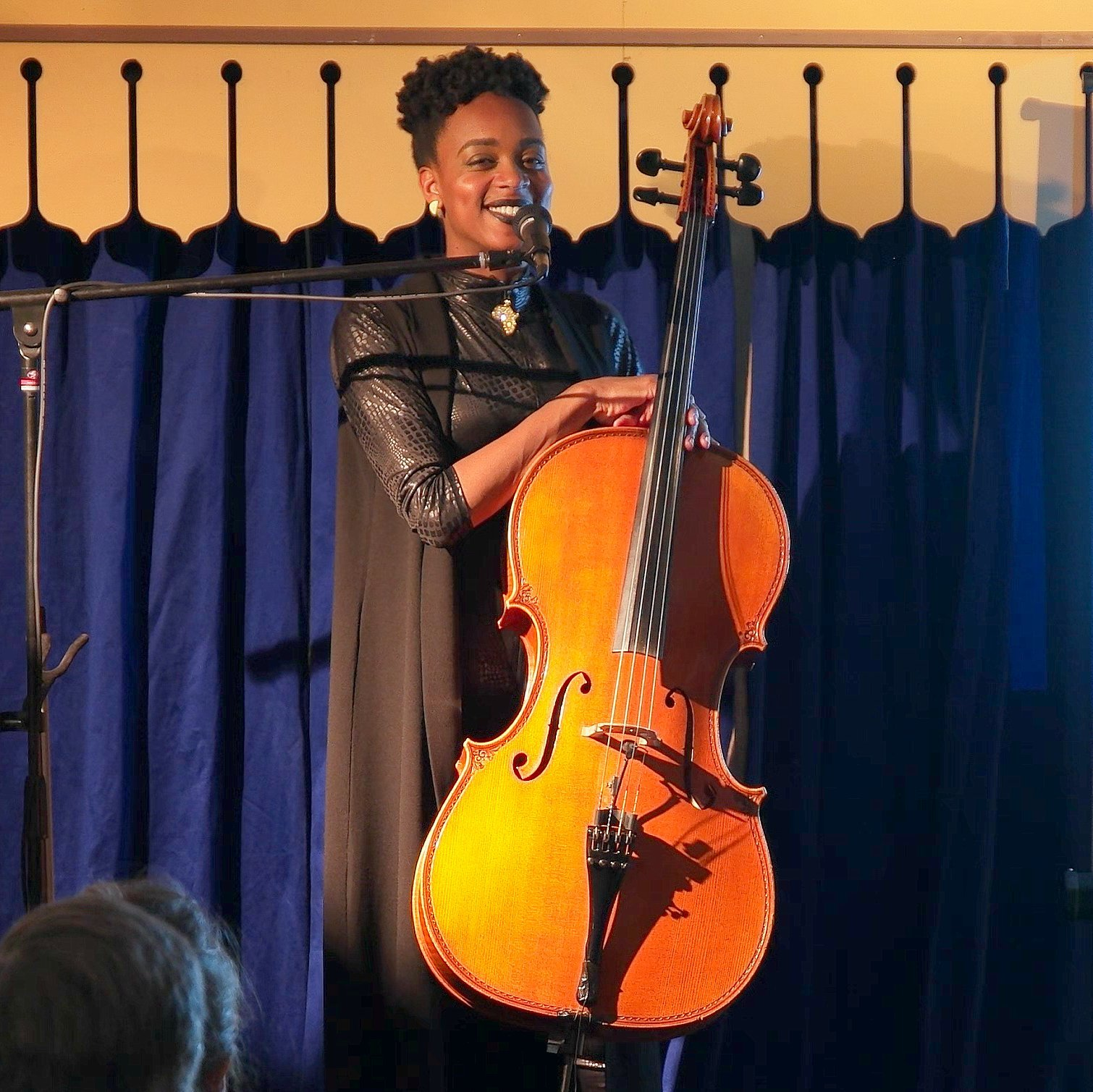
- Witter-Johnson with cello

Background information
- Born: 1980s London, England
- Genres: Soul, Jazz, Blues
- Occupations: Composer, singer, songwriter, cellist, arranger, pianist and producer
- Instruments: Cello, voice, piano
- Labels: Hill & Gully
- Website: www.ayannamusic.com

Ayanna Mose Witter-Johnson (born April–June 1985, London Borough of Islington) is an English composer, singer, songwriter and cellist. Her notable performances include opening for the MOBO Awards "Pre-Show" in 2016, and playing the Royal Albert Hall, London, on 6 March 2018.

== Background and career ==
Ayanna Witter-Johnson was born in London, England, of Jamaican heritage; her mother is a teacher and her father is a television, film and theatre actor Wil Johnson. She began playing the piano when she was four years old and the cello at 13.

Witter-Johnson completed a first-class degree in Classical Composition at the Trinity Laban Conservatoire of Music and Dance in the UK and won the Trinity Laban Silver Award in 2008, subsequently earning a master's of Music (MMus) degree in Composition at the Manhattan School of Music in the USA. While in America in 2010, she became the first non-American to win first place at the Apollo Theater's famous Amateur Night, whose previous winners included Ella Fitzgerald and Jimi Hendrix. Witter-Johnson (who shared first place) was the only non-American to have won the competition. She was a MOBO award shortlist nominee ("Best Jazz Act") in 2012.

Performing both classical and contemporary music – she sings while playing the cello and has described her song-writing style as "a bit of soul, hip-hop and reggae" – Witter-Johnson has toured with artists including Anoushka Shankar, Courtney Pine, Andrea Bocelli and Peter Gabriel. She recorded with Akala and composed for the London Symphony Orchestra.

She has said: "Some of my inspirations both musical and non-musical are Maya Angelou, Nina Simone, Eckhart Tolle, Bach, Stevie Wonder, Steely Dan, Sojourner Truth, Berio, Stravinsky, Oprah Winfrey, Michael Jackson, Ligeti, Jill Scott, Marcus Garvey and Sting....They have encouraged me to celebrate my authenticity, to explore my unique mode of expression and to write from a place of personal truth."

== Awards ==
- 2008: Trinity Silver Award
- 2008: Vivian Prindl Outreach Prize
- 2010: Winner of Amateur Night Live at the Apollo Theater in Harlem
- 2011: Edward & Sally Van Lier Fund
- 2012: Shortlist nominee for "Best Jazz Act" at the MOBO Awards

== Selected discography ==
- 2011: Truthfully (EP)
- 2014: Black Panther (EP)
- 2018: Truthfully Still (EP)
- 2019: Road Runner (Album)
- 2020: Crossroads (Single)
- 2023: Ocean Floor (Album)
