= Anansi Boys =

2005 novel by Neil Gaiman

- First edition cover
- Author: Neil Gaiman
- Cover artist: Richard Aquan (1st printing hardcover edition); general design, Shubhani Sarkar; image collage credited to Getty Images
- Language: English
- Genre: Fantasy
- Publisher: Morrow
- Publication date: 20 September 2005
- Publication place: United States
- Media type: Print (hardback & paperback)
- Pages: 400
- Award: Locus Award for Best Fantasy Novel (2006)
- ISBN: 0-06-051518-X
- OCLC: 60402072
- Dewey Decimal: 813/.54 22
- LC Class: PR6057.A319 A85 2005
- Preceded by: American Gods

Anansi Boys is a fantasy novel by English writer Neil Gaiman. In the novel, "Mr. Nancy"—an incarnation of the West African trickster god Anansi—dies, leaving twin sons, who in turn discover one another's existence after being separated as young children. The novel follows their adventures as they explore their common heritage. Although it is not a sequel to Gaiman's previous novel American Gods, the character of Mr. Nancy appears in both books.

Gaiman mentioned author Thorne Smith as a strong influence when writing the book; "In the back of my head, when I was writing it, I had a writer named Thorne Smith", and "...the Thorne Smith approach to books with eruptions of magic into normal lives seemed like a territory that would be worthwhile to explore." In the dedication to the novel, he also "tips his hat" to P. G. Wodehouse, Tex Avery and Zora Neale Hurston.

Anansi Boys was published on 20 September 2005 and was released in paperback on 1 October 2006. The book debuted at number one on The New York Times Best Seller list, and won both the Locus Award and the British Fantasy Society Award in 2006. The audiobook was released in 2005, narrated by Lenny Henry.

== Plot ==
Anansi Boys is the story of Charles "Fat Charlie" Nancy, a timid Londoner devoid of ambition, whose unenthusiastic wedding preparations are disrupted when he learns that his father (Mr. Nancy) has died in Florida. The flamboyant Mr. Nancy, in whose shadow Fat Charlie has always lived, died in an embarrassing manner by suffering a heart attack while singing to a young woman on stage in a karaoke bar before falling from the stage and accidentally pulling down the woman's top.

Fat Charlie is forced to take time off from his job at the talent agency and travel to Florida for the funeral. Afterwards, while discussing the disposal of Mr. Nancy's estate, Mrs. Callyanne Higgler, a very old family friend, reveals to Fat Charlie that the late Mr. Nancy was actually an incarnation of the West African spider god, Anansi, hence his name. The reason Charlie apparently had not inherited any divine powers was that they had been passed down to his hitherto unknown brother, who, Mrs. Higgler explains, could be contacted simply by sending an invitation via spider. Charlie is skeptical, and on his return to England, largely forgets what Mrs. Higgler had told him, until one night when he drunkenly whispers to a spider that it would be nice if his brother stopped by for a visit.

The next morning, the suave and well-dressed brother, going under the name of "Spider", visits Charlie and is shocked to learn that their father has died. Spider then magically steps into a picture of their childhood home, and Charlie goes off to work, rather puzzled by Spider and his sudden miraculous disappearance.

Spider returns that night, stricken with grief that Anansi had died and that he had been thoughtless enough not to notice. At Spider's recommendation, the two brothers attempt to drown their sorrows and become uproariously drunk on the proverbial trio of wine, women, and song. Although Charlie is not involved in most of the womanising or singing, he is drunk enough to sleep through much of the next day. Spider covers for Charlie's absence from his office at the Grahame Coats Agency by magically disguising himself as Charlie. It is explained that although the two brothers are not identical, Spider uses his divine powers to appear to others as Charlie's twin. While at work, Spider discovers his boss Grahame Coats's long-standing practice of embezzling from his clients and also steals the affection and virginity of Charlie's fiancée, Rosie Noah.

Spider, in the guise of Charlie, reveals his knowledge of the financial improprieties to Grahame Coats during a meeting at which Grahame had planned to fire Charlie, and, as a result, Grahame delays the firing. When Grahame next meets him, he gives the real Charlie a large cheque and a holiday from work. With Charlie out of the office, Grahame Coats proceeds to alter the financial records to frame Charlie for the embezzlement. Embittered by the loss of his fiancée, Charlie uses his holiday to return to Florida and asks Mrs. Higgler and three of her equally old and eccentric friends for help expelling Spider. Unable to banish Spider themselves, they instead send Fat Charlie to "the beginning of the world," an abode of ancient gods, similar to his father, each of whom represents a species of animal. There he encounters the fearsome Tiger, the outrageous Hyena, and the ridiculous Monkey, among others. None is willing to help the son of the trickster Anansi, who has at times embarrassed them all. Finally, Charlie meets Bird Woman, who agrees to trade him her help, symbolised by one of her feathers, in exchange for "Anansi's bloodline".

Meanwhile, in London, a swindled client, Maeve Livingstone, confronts Grahame Coats after learning that her late husband's royalties have been stolen. Grahame Coats murders her with a hammer and conceals her body in a hidden closet.

When Charlie returns to England, events begin to escalate. Charlie quarrels and scuffles with Spider, Charlie is taken in for questioning by the police for financial fraud at the Grahame Coats Agency, Spider reveals the truth of his identity to Rosie, who is angered by his treatment of her, birds repeatedly attack Spider, Grahame Coats escapes England for his estate and bank accounts in the fictional Caribbean country of Saint Andrews, and Maeve Livingstone's ghost begins haunting the Grahame Coats Agency building.

Maeve is contacted by her late husband, who advises her to move on to the afterlife, but she refuses in favour of taking vengeance on Grahame Coats. Later, she meets the ghost of Anansi himself, who recounts a story to her. Once, Anansi reveals, the animal god Tiger owned all stories, and as a result, all stories were dark, violent, and unhappy. Anansi tricked Tiger into surrendering the ownership of stories to him, forever allowing stories to involve cleverness, skill, and often humour rather than strength alone.

After he is attacked by flamingoes, Spider realises that something Charlie did is causing these attacks and that he is in mortal peril. Consequently, Spider magically breaks Charlie out of prison. The two discuss matters as they flee from birds from around the world, realising that giving away Anansi's bloodline implicates Charlie as well as Spider. Charlie is then returned to prison and is eventually freed. He mentions a hidden room in Coats's office to the police, who find Maeve Livingstone's body there.

Spider is swept away in a storm of birds, after which Bird Woman removes his tongue to prevent his use of magic. The Bird Woman delivers Spider to Tiger, Anansi's longtime enemy, who imprisons him. In spite of his helplessness, Spider manages to form a little spider out of clay, instructing it to go find help in the spider kingdom that Anansi and his descendants command. Despite not being as strong as Tiger, Spider still manages to fend him off for some time while Tiger prolongs killing him, preferring to savour his long hoped-for revenge on Anansi and his brood.

Meanwhile, Rosie and her mother have taken a consolation cruise to the Caribbean, where they unexpectedly meet Grahame Coats, who offers them a tour of his home. The two have not heard of the events in England and thus unsuspectingly walk into a trap at his home, where they are locked in his basement.

Charlie goes searching for Callyanne Higgler to help him solve his problems. He looks for her in Florida, but Anansi's old friends tell him that Mrs. Higgler has returned to the Caribbean country of Saint Andrews. These friends reveal to him that it was another old lady, Mrs. Dunwiddy, who was annoyed with the young Fat Charlie and made a spell to separate his good side from his bad side, which then became Spider, separating the one person into two. Fat Charlie finally finds Mrs. Higgler after a long search in Saint Andrews and is sent again, via seance, to the beginning of the world, where he forces the Bird Woman to give back Anansi's bloodline in return for her feather. Meanwhile, Spider has managed to survive as an overconfident Tiger continues to torment him. When Tiger attempts a killing strike, a massive army of spider reinforcements summoned by Spider overwhelms him and forces his retreat. At this point, Charlie rescues Spider and gives him back his tongue.

Tiger now takes possession of Grahame Coats's body and uses his bloodlust to manipulate him, intending to get revenge on Spider by killing Rosie and her mother. The possession by Tiger, however, makes Grahame Coats vulnerable to attacks from other spirits, and Maeve Livingstone, having found Grahame Coats with the aid of Anansi's ghost, eliminates Coats in the real world and, satisfied, moves on to her afterlife.

Meanwhile, still at the beginning of the world, Charlie, having discovered his power to alter reality by singing a story, recounts the long tale of all that has gone before and humiliates Tiger to the point that Tiger retreats to his cave. Spider then collapses the cave entrance, sealing Tiger inside. Charlie weaves this event into his song, reinforcing it with his powers, such that Tiger is securely trapped. Coats, turned into a stoat, remains with Tiger as an unwelcome guest that can be perpetually eaten for eternity.

In the end, Spider marries Rosie and becomes the owner of a restaurant. He is constantly pressured by Rosie's mother to have children, but (possibly to annoy her), he never does. Charlie begins a successful career as a singer, marries police officer Daisy Day, and has a son (Marcus). Old Anansi, resting comfortably in his grave, watches his two sons approvingly as he contemplates resurrecting himself in 20 or 25 years.

== Charlie's relationships ==
=== Charlie's relationship with his father ===
Charlie and his father have a complex relationship due to his father's (Mr. Nancy's) trickster nature and lack of traditional parental authority. Being a manifestation of the African spider god Anansi, warps his perspective on life and causes him to disregard some responsibilities to his family. "His attitude to life can therefore be sometimes distorted because of his almost eternal life span and this resulted into slight neglection of his duties towards his family" As a result, Charlie often feels like he has to shoulder responsibilities that his father neglects, creating tension in their relationship. Mr. Nancy's actions keep Charlie from viewing him as an actual authority figure, even though he is shown to be charming and capable of entertaining others around him. "He loved to provide fun to other people around him so he was certainly a pleasant and loveable person to be around. Yet this was not enough to make Charlie like him and respect him as an authority or a role model" However, his charm failed to foster admiration or connection between him and Charlie. Mr. Nancy is an unreliable but significant influence in Charlie's life because of his 'cunning', which works contradictory with traditional parenthood. "Mr. Nancy is the poster boy of tricksters, a character who, despite the fact that he is recently deceased, does a lot of laughing and grinning. His mirth carries the book, which Gaiman has said to be at its core about surviving families, but Mr. Nancy's trickster nature stands in direct contradiction with a traditional model of fatherhood that prescribes parental authority" Showing he truly cares about his family, just in his own way. This demonstrates that love and care, while not always traditional, can manifest in unconventional ways. The talk they had at the end of the book could even hint at a better relationship yet to form in the future.

=== Charlie's relationship with his mother ===
Charlie struggled with his mother's acceptance of Mr. Nancy's absence. "Charlie loved his mother with all his heart but he did not approve of her putting up with his father's attitude. He was really getting frustrated by how his father behaved and that he barely was at home but his mother did not really mind Mr. Nancy's absences." His frustration stemmed from a deep sense of loyalty to his mother, who he believed deserved better. Charlie found it hard to comprehend that she put up with his father's frequent absences. Charlie and his mother both thought their family dynamic was normal, but Charlie continued to complain to his father's actions. "Anansi did not care about how his children are doing because of his attitude towards life. This seemed completely normal to him." Despite their differences, Charlie's connection with his mother remained robust. She served as a constant source of stability in his life.

=== Charlie's relationship with Spider ===
Spider is first introduced as a brother Charlie never knew he had. When they first met, Spider and Charlie got along great with Spider getting Charlie to break free from his 'normal' behavior. Then he messes up and falls for Charlie's fiancé Rosie. At first, Charlie is pissed at him, Spider has no boundaries and isn't used to being told no. Charlie initially feels betrayed and angry as Spider disrupts the equilibrium of his life and they fight like brothers do, if those brothers were supernatural. Though in the end like every fairy tale, they end up saving each other. With Spider getting Rosie and Charlie finding something new with a cop named Daisy. Spider isn't just his brother, it's stated that he's a part of Charlie that was separated because he made Dunwiddy upset by breaking her ornament. Spider isn't just a piece of him, "Spider represented what Charlie was to learn from his father and how his father wanted him to be." Spider represents Charlie's potential and wants. Spider showing up in his life made him realize what he really wanted, that deep down he “wanted to be like his father." His easy going demeanor, charisma, and self-assurance emphasize both what Charlie has rejected from his father and what he secretly longed for. This realization forced Charlie to reconcile with aspects of himself he had been avoiding. The part that was separated from him in the beginning. Through their conversations, Charlie finds himself forced to acknowledge that some of his father's traits—such as humor, bravery, and adaptability—are not necessarily bad, and to overcome his reluctance to embrace them. Spider challenges Charlie to strike a balance between his own guarded tendencies and the unbridled energy he has long rejected by acting as both a rival and a mirror to himself. Charlie eventually learns to incorporate these elements into his own character, creating a more complete and confident version of himself, as opposed to flatly rejecting his father. One example of this is the green hat Charlie is given and starts to wear at the end of the book.

== Awards and nominations ==
Anansi Boys won the Locus, Mythopoeic, YALSA ALEX, and August Derleth Awards in 2006. Despite garnering enough votes for a Hugo nomination, Gaiman declined it.

== Adaptations ==
=== Radio ===
In 2005, Mike Walker adapted Anansi Boys into a radio play for the BBC World Service. It stars Lenny Henry as Spider and Fat Charlie, Matt Lucas as Grahame Coats and Tiger, Rudolph Walker as Anansi, Doña Croll as Mrs Noah and the Bird Woman, Tameka Empson as Mrs Higgler, Petra Letang as Rosie, Jocelyn Jee Esien as Daisy, and Ben Crowe as Cabbies and other voices. It was broadcast on 17 November 2007. The original soundtrack was composed by Danish composer in residence Nicolai Abrahamsen. It was directed by Anne Edyvean, who also worked on the Radio 3 adaptation of Gaiman's Signal to Noise in 1996.

Gaiman stated that he was displeased with the BBC radio adaptation, because "budget cutbacks and less broadcasting time for drama [have caused BBC to decide] it would have to be an hour-long adaptation. And bad things happen when novels get cut down to an hour. So despite a really terrific cast and production and as solid a script as could be in the circumstances, I was not happy. It felt like one of those Reader's Digest condensed books".

A new, six-part full-cast radio series was produced in 2017, adapted by Dirk Maggs; it is the fifth of Gaiman's novels Maggs has adapted for radio. It is narrated by Joseph Marcell, and stars Jacob Anderson as Fat Charlie, Nathan Stewart-Jarrett as Spider and Lenny Henry as Anansi, with the rest of the cast including Julian Rhind-Tutt as Grahame Coats and Adjoa Andoh as Bird Woman. It was broadcast on BBC Radio 4 and the BBC iPlayer over six days, beginning on Christmas Day 2017; the first five episodes were 30 minutes each, with a 60-minute finale broadcast on 30 December. Gaiman is reportedly very happy with this version, describing it as his favourite of Maggs' adaptations.

=== Film ===
Gaiman's displeasure with the first BBC radio adaptation led to a willingness to write the script of an Anansi Boys film. He said that "I normally say no to adapting my own stuff into film. But I wanted an Anansi Boys adaptation I could be proud of, and the radio adaption had left me wanting to go: No, this is what I meant".

=== Television ===
In 2014, it was reported a television miniseries of Anansi Boys was being produced by the BBC. It was to be made by Red Production Company with Gaiman as executive producer. Although the miniseries was never made, elements of the abandoned series were instead incorporated into the Starz adaptation of American Gods.

In May 2020, it was reported that a miniseries adaptation was in development by Endor Productions, for Amazon Prime Video. In July 2021, it was announced that Amazon had given the production a series order consisting of 6 episodes. It would be produced by Amazon Studios, The Black Corporation, Endor Productions, and Red Production Company, with Lenny Henry and Neil Gaiman as writers and executive producers. Delroy Lindo is set to star as Mr. Nancy. Malachi Kirby is also set to star as Fat Charlie and Spider. Filming of the series commenced in January 2022 in Edinburgh.

=== Comics ===
In 2024, Gaiman partnered with Marc Bernardin to adapt Anansi Boys into a multi-volume comic series, with the artwork done by Shawn Martinbrough. Published by Dark Horse Comics, the first volume of Anansi Boys was supposed to run for eight issues. However, following allegations of sexual misconduct against Gaiman, Dark Horse cancelled the project after seven issues.

== Translations ==
- Момчетата на Ананси (Bulgarian), ISBN 978-954-655-242-6
- Anansiho chlapci (Czech), ISBN 80-7332-079-7
- I ragazzi di Anansi (Italian), ISBN 88-04-55701-X
- בני אנאנסי (Hebrew)
- Os Filhos de Anansi (Portuguese), ISBN 972-23-3592-8
- Сыновья Ананси (Russian), ISBN 978-5-17-098225-7
- Chłopaki Anansiego (Polish), ISBN 83-7480-020-8
- Băieții lui Anansi (Romanian), ISBN 973-733-103-6
- De bende van Anansi (Dutch), ISBN 90-245-5385-7
- Los hijos de Anansi (Spanish), ISBN 978-84-96544-66-6
- Anansi dēli (Latvian), ISBN 978-9984-777-69-6
- Hämähäkkijumala (Finnish)
- アナンシの血脈 (Japanese), ISBN 4-04-791534-3
- Anansi Boys (German), ISBN 978-3-453-26530-1
- Anansijevi momci (Serbian), ISBN 86-7436-611-2
- 蜘蛛男孩 (Chinese), ISBN 978-986-6665-19-6
- 阿南西之子 (Chinese – Taiwan) ISBN 978-986-6665-19-6
- Anansi fiúk (Hungarian), ISBN 9786155468865
- Дітлахи Анансі (Ukrainian), ISBN 978-966-948-206-8

== Cultural references ==
- The character Daisy is so named because her parents own and ride a tandem bicycle. This references the 1892 song "Daisy Bell (Bicycle Built for Two)".
- It is also stated that Daisy's father teaches computer science. This may be a reference either to the song's use in early speech synthesis or to the scene from the 1968 novel and film 2001: A Space Odyssey in which the HAL 9000 computer sings it during its gradual deactivation.
