= Black Earth Rising =

2018 British television programme by Hugo Blick

- Also known as: The Forgiving Earth
- Genre: Drama; Psychological thriller; Political thriller
- Written by: Hugo Blick
- Directed by: Hugo Blick
- Starring: Michaela Coel; John Goodman; Tamara Tunie; Abena Ayivor; Noma Dumezweni; Harriet Walter; Danny Sapani; Tyrone Huggins; Ronald Guttman; Lucian Msamati; Nyasha Hatendi
- Theme music composer: Leonard Cohen
- Opening theme: "You Want It Darker"
- Country of origin: United Kingdom
- Original language: English
- No. of series: 1
- No. of episodes: 8

Production
- Executive producers: Greg Brenman; Hugo Blick
- Producer: Abi Bach
- Cinematography: Hubert Taczanowski
- Editor: Jason Krasucki
- Running time: 60 minutes
- Production companies: Drama Republic; Eight Rooks Production

Original release
- Network: BBC Two
- Release: 10 September – 29 October 2018

Black Earth Rising is a 2018 British psychological thriller television miniseries written and directed by Hugo Blick, about the prosecution of international war criminals. The series is a co-production between BBC Two and Netflix. The show aired on BBC Two in the United Kingdom starting on 10 September 2018; Netflix began streaming the show internationally outside the UK on 25 January 2019.

== Plot ==
The story centres on Kate Ashby, who works as a legal investigator in the London law chambers of Michael Ennis. When Kate's adoptive mother Eve takes on a case prosecuting a Rwandan militia leader, the story pulls Michael and Kate into a journey that will upend their lives forever.

== Cast ==
- Michaela Coel as Kate Ashby, a 28-year-old, Rwandan-born British legal investigator
- John Goodman as Michael Ennis, an American divorced barrister living and working in the UK; employer of Kate Ashby
- Tamara Tunie as Eunice Clayton, US Assistant Secretary of State for African Affairs
- Noma Dumezweni as Alice Munezero, a Rwandan government official and former general in the Rwandan Patriotic Army
- Harriet Walter as Eve Ashby, Kate's adoptive mother, and an international prosecution barrister
- Danny Sapani as General Simon Nyamoya, a former Tutsi corporal who helped bring the Rwandan genocide to an end
- Tyrone Huggins as Patrice Ganimana, a Rwandan Hutu who helped implement the Rwandan genocide
- Ronald Guttman as Jacques Antoine Barré, a former advisor to the Élysée Palace between 1987 and 1994
- Aure Atika as Sophie Barré, daughter of Jacques Antoine Barré; CEO of Barré Resources
- Abena Ayivor as Bibi Mundanzi; the overwhelmingly well-liked, third-term president of Rwanda, and adoptive sister of Alice Munezero
- Lucian Msamati as David Runihura, special advisor to the Rwandan president
- Mimi Ndiweni as Mary Mundanzi, daughter of Bibi Mundanzi and David Runihura
- Hugo Blick as Blake Gaines, a successful, unscrupulous defence barrister and rival of Ennis; hired to defend Patrice Ganimana
- Kathryn Hunter as Capi Petridis, prosecutor of the International Criminal Court
- Serge Hazanavicius as Marc Previeau, a senior French juge d'instruction based in Paris
- Emmanuel Imani as Florence Karamera, a mysterious man aiding and protecting Kate
- Julian Glover as Mark Viner, a retired barrister and Eve Ashby's former boss
- Malou Coindreau as Hana Ennis, Michael's daughter and a former financial analyst, who has been in a coma for three years
- Michael Gould as Harper Hopkinson, a book illustrator and Hana Ennis's stepfather

== Episodes ==
No.	Title	Directed by	Written by	Original release date	UK viewers (millions)
1	"In Other News"	Hugo Blick	Hugo Blick	10 September 2018	2.27
International criminal lawyer Eve Ashby agrees to prosecute Simon Nyamoya (Danny Sapani), a Rwandan general-turned-mercenary who has been extradited to the International Criminal Court in The Hague. Her adopted daughter, Kate, is a refugee of the Rwandan genocide, and recognises Nyamoya as an important figure in ending the massacre. She struggles to come to terms with the decision and feels betrayed by her mother, and pleads with her to prosecute people responsible for the genocide instead. In the Democratic Republic of Congo, UN forces try to arrest war criminal Patrice Ganimana (Tyrone Huggins) but mistake another man for him, which results in one of their own men being killed instead.
2	"Looking at the Past"	Hugo Blick	Hugo Blick	17 September 2018	N/A
Nyamoya's trial is brought to an early and bloody conclusion when he and Eve are assassinated. As Kate and Michael grapple with unfolding events, they are asked for help by Rwandan general Alice Munezero (Noma Dumezweni), an old friend who is arrested upon her return to Europe on suspicion of murdering a French priest in Rwanda in 1994. Acting as Alice's legal investigator, Kate heads to France in search of the truth and learns that the man she is accused of murdering may not even be dead.
3	"A Ghost in Name"	Hugo Blick	Hugo Blick	24 September 2018	N/A
Kate continues her search for the truth and tries to flush out Father Patenaude (Pascal Laurent) by informing him of his mother's ill health. Back in London, Michael is about to go under the knife and Kate is unable to reach him for advice when she meets with a shady figure in the Paris catacombs. As Alice's case finally comes before the court, Brigadier General Lesage (Olivier Rabourdin) offers testimony which looks to stop the defence in their tracks – until Kate realises where she's seen him before.
4	"A Bowl of Cornflakes"	Hugo Blick	Hugo Blick	1 October 2018	N/A
Patenaude's return results in the prosecution against Alice being dropped. Michael receives word that Patrice Ganimana is being treated for cancer in London, but soon clashes with an old rival, Blake Gaines (Hugo Blick) who has been assigned to represent him. But before Ganimana can be extradited to the ICC, Capi (Kathryn Hunter) informs Michael that the case is being withdrawn due to twelve key witnesses retracting their statements.
5	"The Eyes of the Devil"	Hugo Blick	Hugo Blick	8 October 2018	N/A
Gaines falls foul of the secret parties funding his legal fees. Angered at Michael's instance of the inability to prosecute Ganimana, Kate offers to help out David Runihura (Lucian Msamati) as the Rwandan court of justice try to extradite him to stand trial in his own country. Kate also tries to locate a file written by her mother in 1997 to work out why Ganimana was not prosecuted at the time.
6	"The Game's True Nature"	Hugo Blick	Hugo Blick	15 October 2018	N/A
7	"Double Bogey on the Ninth"	Hugo Blick	Hugo Blick	22 October 2018	N/A
8	"The Forgiving Earth"	Hugo Blick	Hugo Blick	29 October 2018	N/A

== Production ==
The series was commissioned as Black Earth Rising in 2017. For some time during production it was known as The Forgiving Earth, but it went back to its original title by April 2018. The series is a co-production between BBC Two and Netflix.

During a night shoot of a car stunt scene in Ghana, camera operator Mark Milsome was killed.

The production used a private residence in Sevenoaks, Kent, for some of the filming; the swimming pool of the residence doubled for a spa hotel in Paris.

== Release ==
The show aired on BBC Two in the UK starting on 10 September 2018;

Netflix began streaming the show internationally outside the UK on 25 January 2019.

== Reception ==
Critics were overwhelmingly positive. The miniseries has a score of 79% positive reviews on review aggregator Rotten Tomatoes, with the consensus: "Black Earth Rising is an exceptional political thriller, confronting relevant challenges and deep-seated geopolitical problems with storytelling verve and a wise refusal to provide any easy answers."
