= Sara Collins =

Jamaican-born novelist

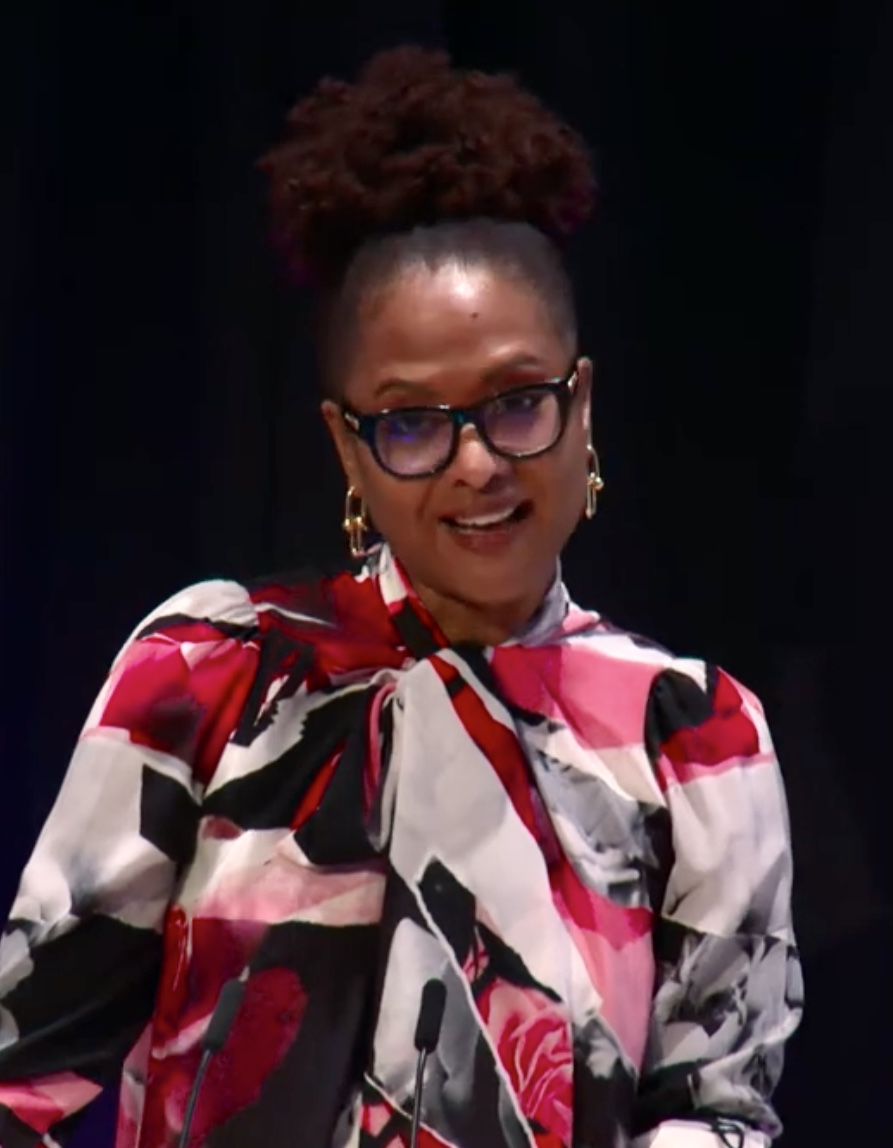
- Collins at the British Library in 2021
- Born: Kingston, Jamaica
- Education: London School of Economics; University of Cambridge
- Occupation: Writer
- Notable work: The Confessions of Frannie Langton (2019)
- Spouse: Iain McMurdo (m. 2008)
- Awards: Costa Book Award
- Website: saracollinsauthor.com

Sara Collins is a Jamaican-born Caymanian-British novelist and former lawyer. She earned a Costa Book Award for her 2019 historical fiction novel The Confessions of Frannie Langton.

== Early life and law ==
Collins was born in Kingston, Jamaica. When she was four years old, her family migrated to Grand Cayman in the Cayman Islands, the home of her paternal grandmother, in light of political violence following the 1976 Jamaican election. She attended boarding school in England at the age of 11.

Collins went on to graduate in law from the London School of Economics. She worked for 17 years as a lawyer, during which time she jointly edited International Trust Disputes. She was a partner and Head of Trust & Private Client in the Cayman Islands office of Conyers Dill & Pearman.

== Writing ==
Collins took a Master of Studies degree in creative writing at the University of Cambridge Professional and Continuing Education from 2014–2016. While studying at Cambridge, she was awarded the 2016 Michael Holroyd prize for non-fiction (or, as he termed it, "recreative writing") for her work Knocking on Walcott's Door, described as "a form of literary autobiography".

The Confessions of Frannie Langton takes the form of the deposition of a woman charged with murder, written for her trial at the Old Bailey in London in 1826. Frannie Langton had grown up enslaved on a Jamaican sugar plantation, where her slave-owner had employed her in his research "desperate to prove that Africans aren't human". She was "given" to George Benham and his French wife in London, although free under English law, and "Then, in unclear circumstances, the Benhams are murdered". The book was published in 2019 by Viking, who acquired it shortly before nine companies were due to bid for its rights. Reviewing the book in The Guardian, Natasha Pulley praised it and said "Between her historical research, Frannie's voice and a plot that never slows to a walk, the novel pulls the gothic into new territory and links it back to its origins." The reviewer in The Irish Times called the novel "a beguiling story with strong feminist overtones". Collins won the First Novel award in the 2019 Costa Book Awards.

Collins was shortlisted for the 2020 McKitterick Prize, awarded by the Society of Authors to a debut novelist over the age of 40.

In 2020, ITV announced that they had commissioned Collins to adapt The Confessions of Frannie Langton for the 2023 four-part television series with Drama Republic, beginning in August 2021 and wrapping in November. Filming took place across Yorkshire at locations such as Duncombe Park, Dewsbury Town Hall, South Parade, Wakefield, Dalton Mills, Hull Old Town, Temple Newsam, Versa Leeds Studios, York Mansion House, Bramham Park and Sledmere House.

== Personal life ==
Collins splits her time between London and Cayman. She married Scottish lawyer Iain McMurdo in 2008. They were both single parents when they met at their law firm, McMurdo a widower with three daughters and Collins a divorcee with two.

== Selected publications ==
- Collins, Sara (4 April 2019). The Confessions of Frannie Langton. London: Viking. ISBN 978-0241349199.
- Collins, Sara; Steven Kempster; Morven McMillan; Alison Meek, eds. (2012). International Trust Disputes. Oxford: Oxford University Press. ISBN 9780199594702.
