= Hugo Blick =

British actor and filmmaker

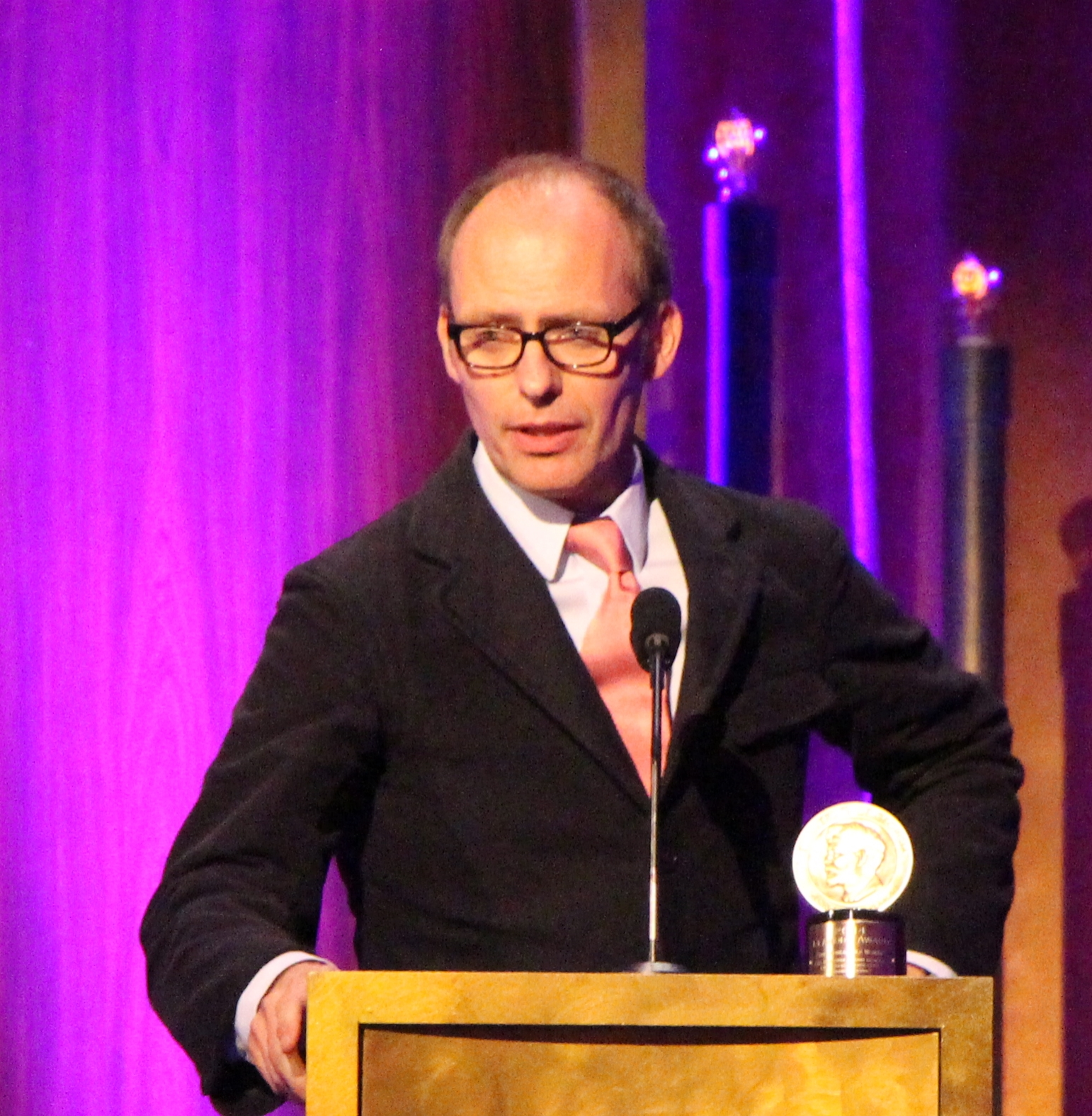
- Born: Henley-on-Thames, Oxfordshire, England
- Occupations: Film director; film producer; screenwriter; actor
- Years active: 1988–present
- Known for: The Shadow Line; The Honourable Woman; Black Earth Rising

Hugo Blick is a British filmmaker and actor. He has his own production company, called Eight Rooks. He is known for the TV series The Shadow Line, The Honourable Woman, and Black Earth Rising.

== Early life and education ==
Hugo Blick was born in Henley-on-Thames, Oxfordshire, England.

He studied in Cardiff at the Royal Welsh College of Music and Drama.

== Career ==
Blick has acted in several films, making his debut as a young Jack Napier, the character who would ultimately become The Joker, in Tim Burton's Batman. He delivers the famous line "Have you ever danced with the devil by the pale moon light?" after having killed the young Bruce Wayne's parents.

He co-wrote, along with Simon Petter, the TV series The Last Word Monologues, a series of three shorts featuring Sheila Hancock, Rhys Ifans, and Bob Hoskins. He had producer credits on several works including Roger & Val Have Just Got In starring Dawn French and Alfred Molina.

Again working with Simon Petter, Blick co-created, produced, and co-directed the TV comedies Marion and Geoff with Rob Brydon and Operation Good Guys, in which he also appeared as "Smiler" McCarthy. Blick also wrote and created the noir thriller The Shadow Line (2011) for the BBC, which starred Chiwetel Ejiofor and Christopher Eccleston.

In 2014, Hugo Blick wrote and directed the BBC drama series The Honourable Woman, which won a Peabody Award and Golden Globe Award.

In 2017, it was announced that Blick would write and direct Black Earth Rising for BBC Two and Netflix. He directed and wrote The English, a western drama TV series starring Emily Blunt, for BBC Two and Amazon Prime Video,which debuted on 10 November 2022 on BBC Two.

Filming took place in August 2025 on his project California Avenue, a television series starring Bill Nighy, Erin Doherty, and Helena Bonham Carter.

Blick has his own film production company, called Eight Rooks.

== Filmography ==
=== Producer/director/writer/actor ===
- 1997: Operation Good Guys
- 2000: Marion and Geoff
- 2001: A Small Summer Party
- 2002: Up in Town
- 2005: Sensitive Skin
- 2008: The Last Word Monologues
- 2010: Roger & Val Have Just Got In (Executive Producer)
- 2011: The Shadow Line
- 2014: The Honourable Woman
- 2014: Sensitive Skin
- 2018: Black Earth Rising
- 2022: The English
- TBA: California Avenue

=== Actor ===
- 1989: Batman – Young Jack Napier
- 1989: Blackadder Goes Forth – Lieutenant von Gerhardt
- 1989: A Connecticut Yankee in King Arthur's Court – Mordred
- 1990: Jeeves and Wooster – Claude Wooster
- 1992: Christopher Columbus: The Discovery – De Torres
- 1994: Flush – Executive
- 1996: The Wind in the Willows – Justin
- 1997: Operation Good Guys – Narrator / 'Smiler' McCarthy’ / Hugo Crippin
- 2005: Sensitive Skin – G.I. Johnson
- 2018: Black Earth Rising – Blake Gaines

=== Self ===
- 2015: 67th Primetime Emmy Awards – Self–Nominee
