= Drama Republic =

British drama production company

- Founded: January 9, 2013; 13 years ago
- Founder: Greg Brenman; Roanna Benn
- Headquarters: London, England
- Parent: Mediawan (2021–present)
- Website: www.dramarepublic.com

Drama Republic is a British independent television production company specialising in high-quality drama. The company was founded in 2013 by Greg Brenman and Roanna Benn; since 2021, they have been part of the French audiovisual production and distribution company Mediawan.

== History ==
Drama Republic was founded on 9 January 2013 when British drama producers Greg Brenman and Roanna Benn have left Endemol-owned British production company Tiger Aspect Productions to set up their own independent drama production company based in London and had signed a first-look distribution deal with BBC Worldwide to distribute the new production company's programmes internationally.

On July 5 2021, it was announced that French audiovisual production and distribution company Mediawan and German audiovisual production and distribution company Leonine Holding through their joint venture production division Mediawan & Leonine Studios had acquired a majority stake in Drama Republic, marking Mediawan and Leonine Holding's expansion into the British television market with Drama Republic founders and CEOs Greg Brenman and Roanna Benn continuing to lead Drama Republic.

== Filmography ==
Title	Years	Network	Notes
Doctor Foster	2015–2017	BBC One	
Wanderlust	2018	BBC One; Netflix (international)	
Us	2020	BBC One	
Life	2020	BBC One	
The Lovers	2023	Sky Atlantic	co-production with Sky Studios
One Day	2024	Netflix	co-production with Universal International Studios and Focus Features
Steal	2026	Amazon Prime Video	co-production with Amazon MGM Studios
