= Greg Brenman =

English film & TV producer

Greg Brenman is an English film and television producer.

== Career ==
Brenman spent 20 years at UK's Tiger Aspect Productions, where he became Head of Drama and produced or executive produced over 400 hours of British TV drama including Peaky Blinders (2013–2022), Ripper Street (2012–2016), My Mad Fat Diary (2013–2015), Prisoners' Wives (2012–2013), Robin Hood (2006–2009) and Secret Diary of a Call Girl (2007–2011). He also produced films including White Girl (2008) and Billy Elliot (2000), and executive produced Omagh (2004).

In 2013, Brenman left Tiger Aspect and founded a new production company called Drama Republic with his former Tiger Aspect colleague Roanna Benn. At Drama Republic, Brenman has executive produced TV series including Doctor Foster (2015–present), Black Earth Rising (2018), The English (2022), Us (2020), The Irregulars (2021) and The Confessions of Frannie Langton (2022).

== Awards and honors ==
Brenman has been nominated for 11 BAFTA Awards, winning three:

- 2000: Alexander Korda Award to Greg Brenman, Jonathan Finn, Stephen Daldry for Most Outstanding Film of the Year – Billy Elliot
- 2005: Best Single Drama for Omagh, Greg Brenman, Ed Guiney, Paul Greengrass, Pete Travis & Guy Hibbert
- 2009: Best Single Drama for White Girl
