= John Farrelly =

John Farrelly may refer to:

- John W. Farrelly (1809–1860), Whig member of the U.S. House of Representatives from Pennsylvania
- John V. Farrelly (born 1954), Irish Fine Gael party politician, former TD and senator
- John Farrelly (Australian architect), architect in Queensland, Australia (see Penrhyn, Ipswich)
- John Farrelly (director), Irish writer, director and producer
- Johnny Farrelly, Jockey, see 2010 Grand National
