= Mark Buckley =

Mark Buckley may refer to:

- Mark Buckley (Australian footballer) (born 1962), Australian footballer
- Mark Buckley (tennis) (born 1960), American tennis player
- Mark Buckley (Gaelic footballer) (born 1998), Irish footballer
- Mark Buckley (motorcyclist), motorcyclist at the 2003 British Superbike Championship
- Mark Buckley, participant at the Fresh Film Festival (Ireland)

== See also ==
- Marcus Buckley (born 1971), American football player
