= Small Town, Big Story =

British television series

- Genre: Dark comedy drama
- Created by: Chris O'Dowd
- Written by: Chris O'Dowd
- Directed by: Chris O'Dowd; Catherine Morshead; Mike Ahern; Enda Loughman
- Starring: Christina Hendricks; Paddy Considine
- Countries of origin: United Kingdom; Ireland
- Original language: English
- No. of series: 1
- No. of episodes: 6

Production
- Executive producers: Chris O'Dowd; Christina Hendricks; Colin Callender; Scott Huff; Stefanie Berk; Milan Popelka; Alex Moody
- Producer: Liz Gill
- Running time: 44–47 minutes
- Production companies: Playground Entertainment; FilmNation Entertainment; Sky Studios; Hot Cod Productions

Original release
- Network: Sky Atlantic; Sky Max
- Release: 27 February – 3 April 2025

Small Town, Big Story is a dark comedy drama television series created by Chris O'Dowd and stars Christina Hendricks and Paddy Considine in main roles, while O'Dowd and Hendricks also serve as executive producers. The series premiered on 27 February 2025 on Sky Atlantic and Sky Max.

== Premise ==
The series is set in the fictional rural Northern Irish town of Drumbán, where Hollywood producer Wendy Patterson returns with a major film production, only to shine a spotlight on a hidden secret: the town has a long history of attracting interstellar visitors, a phenomenon she has witnessed and kept quiet about for a quarter of a century.

== Cast and characters ==
- Christina Hendricks as Wendy Patterson
  - Niamh McCormack as Teen Wendy
- Paddy Considine as Séamus Proctor
- David Rawle as Sonny Proctor
- Eileen Walsh as Catherine Proctor
- Clarke Peters as Chet Donald
- Tim Heidecker as Brad
- Leia Murphy as Joanne Proctor
- Patrick Martins as Jules O’Brien
- Evanne Kilgallon as Shelly McGoldrick
- Andrew Bennett as Barry Battles
- Ruth McCabe as Betty Battles
- David Wilmot as Keith McCurdle
- Susan Lynch as Jemima Rowland
- Sam C Wilson as Big Jim
- Michėle Forbes as Barbara
- Peter McGann as Matt Magee
- Chris O'Dowd as Jack E McCarthy
- Jamie Michie as Pubba McGoldrick
- Ian McElhinney as Reverend Patterson
- Deirdre O'Kane as Carol from Casting
- Ruth Codd as Production Peggy

== Episodes ==
No. in series	Title	Directed by	Written by	Original release date
1	"The White Ridge"	Chris O'Dowd	Chris O'Dowd	27 February 2025
2	"How Many People Does He Need?"	Chris O'Dowd	Chris O'Dowd	6 March 2025
3	"On Children"	Catherine Morshead	Chris O'Dowd	13 March 2025
4	"An Dobhar Who?"	Catherine Morshead	Chris O'Dowd; Nick V. Murphy	20 March 2025
5	"The Pen Is Mighty"	Mike Ahern; Enda Loughman	Chris O'Dowd; Maeve Higgins	27 March 2025
6	"The Turd Man"	Mike Ahern; Enda Loughman	Rachel Kilfeather	3 April 2025

== Production ==
=== Development ===
The series is created and written by Chris O'Dowd. He wrote the show during the COVID-19 pandemic whilst in lockdown on a production in Canada. He has described it as a "cultural cousin" to his 2010s series Moone Boy, with both productions sharing a lot of the same crew.

O'Dowd is also a director on the series alongside Catherine Morshead, Mike Ahern and Enda Loughman. Playground Entertainment and FilmNation Entertainment also produce in association with Sky Studios. Colin Callender and Scott Huff are executive producers for Playground, Stefanie Berk and Milan Popelka are executive producers for FilmNation Entertainment and Alex Moody is executive producer for Sky Studios. Christina Hendricks and O’Dowd are also executive producers with Liz Gill the series producer.

=== Casting ===
The cast is led by Hendricks alongside Paddy Considine, and also includes Clarke Peters, Tim Heidecker, David Rawle, Eileen Walsh, Leia Murphy, Patrick Martins, Evanne Kilgallon, Andrew Bennett, Ruth McCabe, and David Wilmot as well as Michėle Forbes, Peter McGann, Susan Lynch, Sam C. Wilson, Deirdre O'Kane, and a cameo appearance from O'Dowd.

=== Filming ===
The six-part series was filmed on location around County Wicklow and Boyle, County Roscommon, with production starting by September 2023 and wrapping in February 2024.

== Broadcast ==
The series premiered on 27 February 2025 on both Sky Atlantic and Sky Max simutaneously.

== Critical reception ==
Small Town, Big Story holds an 71% approval rating on review aggregator website Rotten Tomatoes based on seven reviews.
