= Tom Kerrisk =

Irish actor

- Occupations: Actor, musician
- Known for: An Taibhse, The Sleep Experiment

Tom Kerrisk is an Irish actor and musician. He played Éamon in the Irish-language horror film An Taibhse (The Ghost) and appeared in The Sleep Experiment.

== Early life and music ==
Kerrisk grew up in Newmarket-on-Fergus, County Clare, and performed in school productions. He studied information technology at the University of Galway. After graduating, he worked in Germany's technology sector and performed with bands. He subsequently worked as a model in Los Angeles before returning to Ireland.

He founded the band The Spikes in 2004 and later performed with Mystic Tears. Kerrisk and Ally Donald composed the soundtracks for The Sleep Experiment and An Taibhse.

== Acting career ==
Kerrisk appeared in John Farrelly's The Sleep Experiment (2022). He received the Best Actor award at the ninth Los Angeles Crime and Horror Film Festival for the performance. He also appeared in the short film Difriúil (2022).

In An Taibhse, directed by Farrelly, Kerrisk played Éamon, a father who becomes a caretaker of a country house with his daughter played by Livvy Hill. The film premiered at the Galway Film Fleadh in July 2024 and was released in Irish cinemas in March 2025. Kim Newman described Kerrisk and Hill's performances as "excellent" and "nuanced". Kerrisk received a Best Actor award at the South African Horrorfest for the role.

Kerrisk starred as Adam in Farrelly's romantic fantasy film Naxos (2026). He was also a producer of the film, which premiered at the Galway Film Fleadh on 10 July 2026.

== Filmography ==
- The Sleep Experiment (2022), as Christopher Sampson
- Difriúil (2022; short)
- The Lost Jedi (2022; short)
- A Hollow Tree (2023)
- An Taibhse (2024; Irish cinema release in 2025), as Éamon
- Naxos (2026), as Adam

== Awards ==
- Best Actor, Los Angeles Crime and Horror Film Festival (2022), for The Sleep Experiment
- Best Actor, South African Horrorfest, for An Taibhse
