= Cal O'Driscoll =

Irish actor

Cal Arnold O'Driscoll (born 2003 or 2004) is an Irish actor and filmmaker. He was named Ireland’s youngest film-maker of the year in 2020 at the Fresh Film Festival. In 2025, he won the Breakthrough Talent Award at the Royal Television Society Republic of Ireland Awards. His television roles have included Prince Edward in Netflix historical drama Vikings: Valhalla (2024) and Con in the comedy-horror series Video Nasty (2025).

O'Driscoll was named a 2026 Screen International Star of Tomorrow.

== Career ==
He is from Dublin, Ireland, and started-out in production as a young man, initially making YouTube videos at the age of eight years-old. In 2020, won the title of Ireland's Young Filmmaker of the Year 2020 at the Fresh Film Festival. This Came about following the production of his film Pirates, which is centred around a pirate radio station and set in the 1980s. As an actor he appeared in The Windermere Children, a BBC film, in 2020.

He played Prince Edward (a young Edward the Confessor) in Netflix historical drama series Vikings: Valhalla. In 2024, he had roles in Sanctuary: A Witch's Tale and Channel 5 thriller series The Teacher. He also played John in the Ariane Labed independent film September Says, which premiered at the Cannes Film Festival.

In 2025, he could be seen in a lead role in 1980s-set comedy-horror series Video Nasty from Christopher Smith in which he led the cast alongside Justin Daniels Anene and Leia Murphy. He was awarded the Breakthrough Talent Award at the Royal Television Society Republic of Ireland Awards, held in Dublin on 27 March 2025. In January 2026, he nominated at the Irish Film & Television Awards for best supporting actor. That year, he was confirmed as joining the cast of historical drama series Peaky Blinders.

== Filmography ==
Year	Title	Role	Notes
2020	The Windermere Children	Malcolm	TV film
2022	The Sleep Experiment	Steven	
2023	Obituary	Denis Riley	2 episodes
2024	September Says	John	Film
2024	Sanctuary: A Witch's Tale	Ollie	5 episodes
2024	Vikings: Valhalla	Prince Edward	4 episodes
2024	The Teacher	Zac Webster	3 episodes
2025	Video Nasty	Con	Lead role; 6 episodes
2025	Save Me From Heavan	Chris	Short Film
