= Penryn =

Penryn is a Cornish word meaning 'headland' that may refer to:

- Penryn, Cornwall, United Kingdom, a town of about 7,000 on the Penryn River
  - Penryn railway station, a station on the Maritime Line between Truro and Falmouth Docks, and serves the town of Penryn, Cornwall
  - Penryn Campus is a university campus in Penryn, Cornwall
- Penryn (UK Parliament constituency) a former constituency based on Penryn, Cornwall
- Penryn RFC, an English and Cornish rugby union club based in the town of the same name
- Penryn, California, in the United States, a town of 831, and home to a granite quarry
- Penryn (microarchitecture), code name for a CPU core from Intel, used in Core 2 Duo
- Penryn (microprocessor), code name for a microprocessor die from Intel, used in mobile Core 2 Duo

Penrhyn is a Welsh word meaning 'headland' that may refer to:

- Baron Penrhyn, a title of peerage
- Penrhyn Bay, a small town on the North Wales coast
- Penrhyn Castle, a country house in North Wales
  - Penrhyn Castle Railway Museum
- Penrhyn atoll, in the Cook Islands in the South Pacific
- Penrhyn, Ipswich, a heritage-listed house in Queensland, Australia
- Penrhyn Quarry, a slate quarry near Bethesda in North Wales
- Penrhyn Quarry Railway, a railway serving the Penrhyn Quarry
- Penrhyn railway station, a station serving the village of Penrhyndeudraeth on the Ffestiniog Railway
- Port Penrhyn, a port serving the Penrhyn Quarry
- Penrhyn-coch, a village in Ceredigion, West Wales
- Penrhyndeudraeth, a village near Porthmadog, Gwynedd, sometimes simply called Penrhyn

== See also ==
- Penrhyn language, a language spoken in the Cook Islands
