= Tommie Earl Jenkins =

American actor (born 1965)

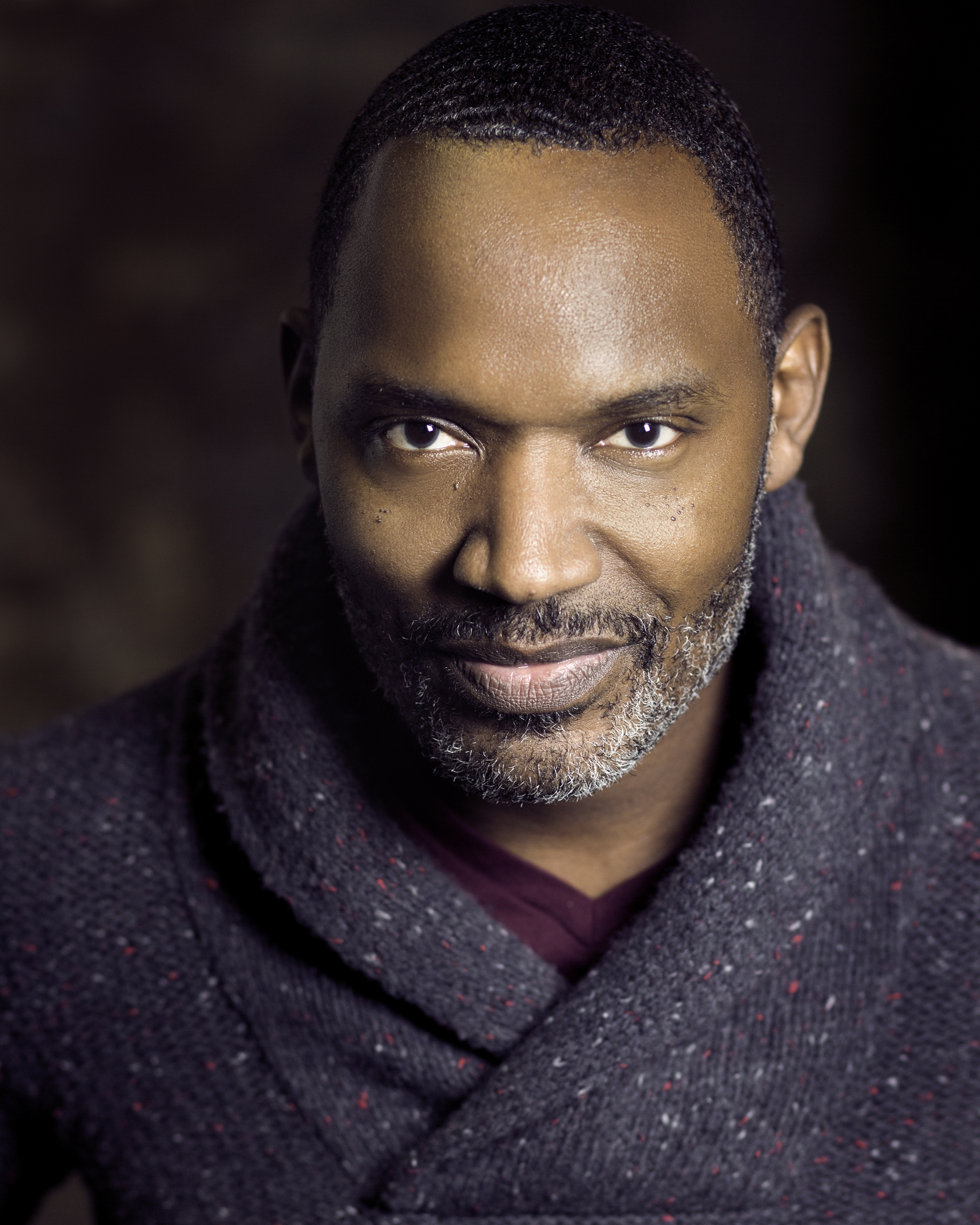
- Born: November 13, 1965 (age 60); Canton, Ohio, U.S.
- Other name: Tee Jaye
- Occupations: Actor; musician; stage performer
- Years active: 1979–present
- Spouse: Jye Frasca (m. 2000)

Tommie Earl Jenkins (born November 13, 1965), also known as Tee Jaye, is an American actor, musician and stage performer most noted for the voice of Ubercorn in the TV series Go Jetters, acting as Die-Hardman in Death Stranding and its sequel, and the origination of the role Barry Belson in the musical Jersey Boys.

== Personal life ==
A native of Canton, Ohio, Jenkins has spent more than twenty years in the United Kingdom. He returned to the United States in 2014.

In 2000, Jenkins married Jye Frasca.

== Career ==
Jenkins originally trained as a classical ballet dancer. He studied ballet at Canton Ballet under the Artistic Direction of Cassandra Crowley in Canton, Ohio where he was a scholarship student. He danced professionally with the Duluth Ballet of Minnesota and the Alvin Ailey American Dance Theater in New York City. He has worked in numerous theatrical performances as both a dancer and actor as well as a film and voice actor.

== Filmography ==
Key
†	Denotes works that have not yet been released

=== Film ===
Year	Title	Role	Notes
2004	Fascination	Voice	German release film
2005	Tideland	Performer	Song: "Wash Me in the Blood of Jesus"
2012	Gambit	Couple husband	
2013	The Callback Queen	Chuck Rydell	
2014	The Trip	Jeremy	Short film, London Sci-Fi Festival
2015	Tulips		Short film to launch feature film The White King
2018	Papi Chulo	Tom	
2019	Dolemite Is My Name		Uncredited
2022	Paradise Highway	Bob	
2025	Mission: Impossible – The Final Reckoning	Colonel Burdick	
2026	Greenland 2: Migration	General Sharpe	

=== Television ===
Year	Title	Role	Notes
1996	Goodnight Sweetheart	Niles	Episode: "The Yanks Are Coming" (as Tee Jaye)
2008	Loose Women	Himself	Guest; S12E 137
2011	Moby Dick	Sailor	Uncredited, two episodes
2015	Galavant	Pirate	Episode: "Comedy Gold"; uncredited
2015	Autopsy: The Last Hours Of...	O. J. Simpson	Episode: "Nicole Brown Simpson and Ron Goldman"
2015	American Odyssey	Osela Soldier #1	Episode: "Gone Elvis"
2015–2020	Go Jetters	Ubercorn	Voice, 148 episodes
2016	Roots	Narrator	Television special documentary, 2 episodes
2017	Shooter	Navy Commander	Episode: "The Hunting Party"
2017	Law & Order True Crime	Reporter #2	3 episodes
2017	How to Get Away with Murder	Donald	Episode: "Wes"
2017	General Hospital	Dean Paulson	2 episodes
2018	Unsolved: The Murders of Tupac and the Notorious B.I.G.	Wayne Higgins	Episode: "Half the Job" (as Tommie Jenkins)
2018	For the People	FBI Agent Steven Tate	Episode: "First Inning"
2019	The Politician	Teacher	S1E5
2019	Pandora	Ellison Pevney	Main role, 9 episodes
2020	The Last Word	René	English version, episode 6
2020	The Minions of Midas	Alfonso, Diego Rocal	English version, two episodes
2021	Dead Pixels	Dr. Larry	S2E4
2021	Lupin	Babakar	English version, three episodes
2022	King of Stonks	Rick	E4, voice
2022	Wednesday	Mayor Walker	Recurring Role, three episodes
2022	Teenage Euthanasia	Darius	Voice, episode #2.7
2022–2024	Star Trek: Prodigy	Commander Adreek-Hu	2 episodes
2023	Death in Paradise	Kenton Sealy	S12E8
2025	The Rainmaker	Prince Thomas	6 episodes

=== Theater ===
Year	Title	Role	Notes
1979	Purlie the Musical		
1990–1998	Cats	Various (Alonzo, Macavity, Munkustrap, Plato, Rum Tug Tugger)	Hamburg (1990–1991); London (1996–1998)
1993–1996	A Chorus Line	Richie	Carr Performing Arts Centre; A non-commercial BBC Radio broadcast was made with the 1996 cast.
1994–1995	Five Guys Named Moe	Swing, Big Moe, Nomax, Four-eyed Moe	Albery Theater, Also appeared as Four-eyed Moe in the 1995 live video recording
1999–2000	Oh What a Night!	Brutus T. Firefly	Apollo Hammersmith Theatre
2000–2002	Fame	Tyrone Jackson	Victoria Palace Theatre and Cambridge Theatre
2004	Purlie	Purlie Victorious	Bridewell Theatre
2004–2005	Aladdin	Genie	Old Vic Theatre
2005	Tick, Tick...Boom!	Michael	Menier Chocolate Factory
2006	Whistle Down the Wind	Ed	Palace Theatre
2006–2008	Dirty Dancing	Tito Suarez (stand by)	Aldwych Theatre
2008–2012	Jersey Boys	Barry Belson and others	Prince Edward Theatre and August Wilson Theatre
2011	Cinderella	Dandini	Hackney Empire pantomime

=== Video games ===
Year	Title	Role	Notes
2017	Guild Wars 2: Path of Fire	Blish, Human, Noble Human, Utumishi	
2018	Pillars of Eternity II: Deadfire	Director Castol, Player Voice (Male Stoic)	
2018	Earthfall	Roy	
2018	World of Warcraft: Battle for Azeroth		
2018	Fallout 76	Scott Shepherd, Squire Schultz, Lottery Phone Representative, Additional Voices	
2019	Death Stranding	Die-Hardman	Also performance capture
2020	Fallout 76: Wastelanders	Aldridge, Sargento	
2021	The Last Worker	S.P.E.A.R. Leader	
2022	Guild Wars 2: End of Dragons	Additional voices	
2022	Diablo Immortal	Torr	
2022	Saints Row	Santo Ileso Pedestrians	
2022	Gotham Knights	Jacob Kane	
2022	Bayonetta 3	Phantasmaraneae, Baseball commentator	English version
2023	Star Wars Jedi: Survivor	Gulu, additional voices	
2023	The Elder Scrolls Online: Necrom	Azandar Al-Cybiades	Character Companion
2023	Guild Wars 2: Secrets of the Obscure	Lyhr	
2023	Starfield	Aaron Scott	
2024	The Elder Scrolls Online: Gold Road		
2024	Guild Wars 2: Janthir Wilds		
2025	Avowed		
2025	The Elder Scrolls IV: Oblivion Remastered	Orc Male	
2025	Death Stranding 2: On the Beach	Charlie / Die-Hardman	Also performance capture
2025	Dying Light: The Beast	Minister Obasi	

=== Audio books ===
Year	Title	Role	Notes
2013	Twelve Years a Slave	Narrator	W.F. Howes Ltd
2014	The Autobiography of Malcolm X	Narrator	RNIB
2014	The Racketeer	Narrator	RNIB
2014	Brother Ray–Ray Charles' Own Story	Narrator	RNIB
Unknown	Sweet Soul Music: Rhythm and Blues and the Southern Dream of Freedom	Narrator	RNIB

=== Music videos ===
Year	Title	Artist	Role	Notes
1988	"D.E.F. = Doug E. Fresh"	Doug E. Fresh	Staging and choreographing	Music video
1988	"Cut That Zero"	Doug E. Fresh	Staging and choreographing	Music video

=== Music ===
Year	Title	Label	Notes
1992	"Never Too Late"	Polydor Records	Pop
1992	"Baby, Come Back"	Polydor Records	Funk/soul
1994	"Who's That Girl?"	BMG	Electronic/Euro house
1994	"Don't Call It Destiny"	RCA/BMG	Electronic/Euro house
1995	"Let Me Be Your Love"	One Way Records	Electronic/house/Euro House
1997	"Oh Oh My Girl"	One Way Records	Electronic/Euro house
2012	Magic of Disney Concert	n/a	As part of Queen's Diamond Jubillee

=== YouTube ===
Year	Title	Role	Channel
2025	Superintelligence, Black Seas of Infinity, and Mass Effect	Narrator	SUPERJUMP

== Awards and nominations ==
Year	Award	Category	Film/TV show	Results
2016	69th British Academy Film Awards	Best Pre-School Animation	Go Jetters	Nominated
2016	68th Primetime Emmy Awards	Outstanding Short Form Nonfiction or Reality Series	Roots: A New Vision	Nominated
2019	Shacknews	Best Voice Actor	Death Stranding	Won
