= An Taibhse =

Irish language folk horror film

- Directed by: John Farrelly
- Written by: John Farrelly
- Produced by: Jim Sheridan
- Starring: Tom Kerrisk, Livvy Hill
- Cinematography: Ross Power
- Production company: Jackpot Films
- Distributed by: Raven Banner; Firebook Entertainment
- Release dates: July 2024 (Galway Film Fleadh); March 2025 (Ireland)
- Running time: 92 minutes
- Country: Ireland
- Language: Irish

An Taibhse (English: The Ghost) is an Irish language horror feature film. (Note: Multiple sources described An Taibhse as the first ever Irish language horror feature film. See however the feature-length release of Na Cloigne (2010).) Written and directed by John Farrelly, it is set in Ireland in the years after the Great Famine and follows a father and daughter who become winter caretakers at a remote Georgian mansion where a malevolent presence begins to torment them.

== Plot ==
In 1852, Éamon and his teenage daughter Máire accept work as caretakers at a decaying country house for the winter months. As isolation takes hold, strange phenomena escalate. Whispered voices and a lurking entity fixate on Máire, while Éamon begins to unravel under the weight of guilt and desperation.

== Cast ==
- Tom Kerrisk as Éamon
- Livvy Hill as Máire

== Production ==
Jim Sheridan was reported as an executive producer, while Raven Banner and Firebook Entertainment handled worldwide sales. The film, which was filmed under pandemic restrictions, was entirely self-funded.

== Release ==
The world premiere took place at the Galway Film Fleadh in July 2024. The 92-minute film then had its international premiere at Pigeon Shrine FrightFest in London on 23 August 2024, tickets for which sold out. It later screened at the Newport Beach Film Festival in October 2024, and in 2025 was programmed by the Vancouver International Film Festival Centre for its Samhain series.

== Reception ==
An Taibhse (The Ghost) received some strong reviews from Irish and international critics for its atmosphere, direction, and performances. Other reviews questioned the verbal delivery, of Ulster Irish, by actors who were not native speakers of the dialect.

Donald Clarke of The Irish Times praised the film as "taut" and noted that, at "a busy 92 minutes", it "works itself into a symphony of niggling submelodies", highlighting its sense of pace and atmosphere.

Kat Hughes of The Hollywood News described it as "a brilliant debut ... filled with well executed frights that are terrifying enough to haunt your dreams", commending John Farrelly's direction and the film's atmosphere.

A reviewer for Tuairisc.ie likened it to The Shining, adding that some of the shots were a great achievement on a small budget, concluding however that poor delivery of the Ulster Irish dialogue, or possibly the dialogue-writing, seriously detracted from the film.

Aoife Fealy of Film Ireland described it as "a tense and creepy tale", writing that "Farrelly has crafted a strong film that explores personal trauma and the origin of fear ... with successful suspense, creepy tension, and effective jump scares."

Kim Newman called the film "striking" and praised its "excellent, nuanced lead performances" in his FrightFest review, noting how it "blends psychological horror with an evocative sense of place".

Starburst described the film as "a particularly harrowing take on the haunted house story" that is "gorgeously shot and tightly performed", calling it one of the standout discoveries of FrightFest 2024.

Film In Dublin commended its "feverish fearlessness" and described it as "an impressively unsettling piece of work, made with complete creative conviction".

Irish Film Critic called it "a genuinely atmospheric and frightening Irish tale", praising its "ominous tone and unsettling imagery".

At the 2024 Pigeon International Film Festival in Iceland, the film received a special honorary award for language preservation.
