= Milo Callaghan =

British actor

- Born: Milo Moses Callaghan c. 1998/1999
- Education: Queens' College, Cambridge
- Years active: 2015–present

Milo Moses Callaghan (born c. 1998/1999) is an English actor. On television, he starred in the USA Network series The Rainmaker (2025–). He also had recurring roles in the Starz series The Spanish Princess (2020), the Disney+ series Rivals (2024) and the BBC Three series Video Nasty (2025).

== Early life ==
Callaghan grew up in Hoylake in the Wirral peninsula. His mother trained as an actress at the Royal Conservatoire of Scotland. He has three brothers.

Callaghan attended St Anselm's College. He graduated with a Bachelor of Arts (BA) in Education from Queens' College, Cambridge in 2020. During university, Callaghan was a member of the Cambridge Footlights. He starred in a production titled Cicada 3301 alongside Bilal Hasna at the 2019 Edinburgh Fringe Festival, where Callaghan met his agent.

He later attended classes at Manchester School of Acting.

== Career ==
Callaghan made his television debut as Henry Stafford in the Starz historical drama The Spanish Princess in 2020. Callaghan also had early roles in the long-running British television series Casualty and Doctor Who, in which he appeared as Allan K. Sullivan in the episode Dot and Bubble in series 14.

He had the role of Wayne in the 2024 horror film The Strangers – Chapter 2. Callaghan was featured in the 2024 British television series Rivals for Disney+, which was adapted from the 1988 novel of the same name by Jilly Cooper. That year, he could be seen portraying Orry Atreides in the fantasy drama television series Dune: Prophecy.

Callaghan appeared in the British comedy horror television series Video Nasty on BBC 3 in 2025. He was cast in the lead role as Rudy Baylor in the 2025 television drama series The Rainmaker based on John Grisham's 1995 novel of the same name. The role previously was played by Matt Damon in the 1997 film adaptation.

== Filmography ==
Key
†	Denotes works that have not yet been released

=== Film ===
Year	Title	Role	Notes
2024	The Strangers: Chapter 1	Wayne	
2025	The Strangers – Chapter 2	Wayne	

=== Television ===
Year	Title	Role	Notes
2020	The Spanish Princess	Henry Stafford	5 episodes
2023	Casualty	Kai	1 episode
2024	Doctor Who	Allan K Sullivan	1 episode
2024	Rivals	Seb Burrows	8 episodes
2024	Dune: Prophecy	Orry Atreides	1 episode
2025	Video Nasty	Joe	5 episodes
2025–present	The Rainmaker	Rudy Baylor	Main role
