= Go Jetters =

British animated children's television series

- Created by: Barry Quinn; Katie Simmons
- Directed by: Adam Shaw
- Voices of: John Hasler; Tommie Earl Jenkins; Akie Kotabe; Syrus Lowe; Naomi McDonald; Pilar Orti; Marc Silk
- Opening theme: "Go Jetters Theme Song" performed by Sharleen Linton
- Composer: Banks & Wag
- Country of origin: United Kingdom
- Original language: English
- No. of series: 3
- No. of episodes: 154

Production
- Executive producers: Tony Reed; Henrietta Hurford-Jones
- Producer: Adam Redfern
- Running time: 11 minutes
- Production companies: BBC Children's Productions; Boulder Media (Series 1); Giant Animation (Series 1); Blue-Zoo (Series 2-3)

Original release
- Network: CBeebies
- Release: 26 October 2015 – 27 November 2020

Go Jetters is a British animated television series airing on CBeebies and is also available on BBC iPlayer. A geography-based programme, it was commissioned by CBeebies controller Kay Benbow and is a co-production of CBeebies In-house Production and BBC Worldwide.

Aimed at the upper end of kids ages 4 to 6, Go Jetters follows the adventures of four heroes, Xuli, Kyan, Lars, and Foz, as they travel the world with their mentor and friend, Ubercorn. The programme uses songs and music to expose facts about various countries and environments.

== Characters ==
=== Go Jetters ===
Each Go Jetter has a star logo on their basic suit, and a particular specialty and a catchphrase they'll often repeat over the course of the series' episodes.

- Xuli (voiced by Pilar Orti), is the pilot of the Vroomster and occasionally Jet Pad. Until the addition of Tala (Season 3), she was the only female of the group. Xuli wears a purple and yellow suit, with stylised wings around its logo, and dark purple gloves and boots. She has a white fringe. She is from Spain, her catchphrase is 'not cool' and she takes a 'selfie' of the team at the end of each episode, with notable exceptions.
- Kyan (voiced by Akie Kotabe), is portrayed to be sporty and athletic, and talented at gymnastics and parkour. He wears an orange and deep blue suit along with dark blue gloves and dark orange boots with no particular sign of his speciality. He is Chinese-American, has a Californian accent and is known to say "aced it!" in every episode. He is shown to be very energetic.
- Lars (voiced by Syrus Lowe), who is the tallest of the Go Jetters, is really good at fixing things. In red and white, his logo has a cog-shaped surrounding, wearing dark red gloves and boots. He is British and is known to say "Geographic!" in most episodes. Lars is also shown being an Eiffel Tower lover in the first episode of the series.
- Foz (voiced by John Hasler), who is the clever one, and also the smallest. In light blue and yellow wearing light blue gloves and boots, his logo is shaped like a broken circle similar to an on/off symbol. He is also from Britain and is known to build his sentences like mathematical formulae (X plus Y equals Z) and say "ergo".
- Ubercorn (voiced by Tommie Earl Jenkins), an anthropomorphic unicorn who is the leader and mentor of the Go Jet Academy, he is a funky disco-grooving unicorn. Ubercorn is dressed in a white sparkly suit with light blue stars and purple goggles, and has red sparkly hooves and a purple mane and tail. He guides the Go Jetters during their missions by giving them advice and selecting click-ons for them – suit upgrades enabling them to tackle different situations. He also presents them with three 'funky facts' about each place they visit, introduced by a theme song.
- Jet Pad (voiced by Naomi McDonald), is the high-tech computerized jet that helps the Go Jetters to go around the world and serves as their HQ. Jet Pad is electronically powered and in one episode is seen recharging at Niagara Falls using hydropower.
- Tala (voiced by Tala Gouveia), who is a new cadet of the Go Jetters that appears in the third series, and is the niece of Grandmaster Glitch.

=== Villains ===
- Grandmaster Glitch (voiced by Marc Silk), a troublemaker who is a disgruntled former cadet of the Go Jet Academy. Glitch likes mud and having fun, which usually involves destroying or using a landmark to achieve his plans. He has a large moustache, used as his trademark, and funnel-like pieces on his helmet. He calls the Go Jetters insults like "no Jetters" and accuses them of screwing up his fun, and his catchphrase is "Grimbles!" which he says in frustration. He travels around in the Grim HQ, a rusty rocket ship that leaves a trail of smoke, and has a teddy bear called Cuddles.
- Grimbots (voiced by Marc Silk), Grandmaster Glitch's minions. They are spherical little robots who take care of everything at Grim HQ, Glitch's main jet and help Glitch in his mischievous activities. Sometimes in some missions, the Grimbots can help out with the Go Jetters too, if they need an extra hand.

== Episodes ==
=== Series overview ===
Series	Episodes	Originally released	
Series	Episodes	First released	Last released
1	51	26 October 2015	24 February 2017
2	52	18 September 2017	6 December 2018
3	51	26 August 2019	27 November 2020

=== Series 1 (2015–2017) ===
No. overall	No. in season	Title	First aired
1	1	"The Eiffel Tower, France"	26 October 2015
In Paris, when the Grim HQ's broken TV aerial prevents Grandmaster Glitch from watching his favourite soap opera (Hospital for Broken Hearts), he gets his Grimbots to remove and affix the top section of the Eiffel Tower as a replacement, however, the whole structure tips over causing the Eiffel Tower to vertically spear into the earth. After Ubercorn debriefs the Go Jetters about the Eiffel Tower's "Funky Facts", they discover that Eiffel Tower is broken, which causes Lars to cry inaudibly, and them to warn Grandmaster Glitch, via the Grim HQ's "Eiffel Tower" antenna, that they intend to fix it. Lars unscrews Grim HQ, whilst Foster uses his powerful magnet to remove the Grim Bots (also made of iron), in order to prevent them reconnecting it. The Grim HQ is shot into the air when the Eiffel Tower is disconnected, due to it being on full power to take-off with the landmark. Kyan and Foz, using their magnets' 'pull' and 'push' settings, to both prevent the upside-down tower from falling and up-right it into its correct position, bolting it back into place. Whilst the Go Jetters celebrate with an "Eiffel Tower" souvenir selfie, Grandmaster Glitch is reduced to getting his Grim Bots to act out scenes from "Hospital for Broken Hearts", as a substitute for Grim HQ's now broken TV.
2	2	"The Pyramids of Giza, Egypt"	27 October 2015
In Cairo, after Ubercorn briefs them on the Giza pyramid complex's "Funky Facts", the Go Jetters arrive to discover Grandmaster Glitch using his Shrink Ray to shrink the Great Pyramid of Giza, in his attempt to pass level 6 (a pyramid shape) of the Grim HQ's fit-the-shape computer game, thereby winning the game's "Ultimate Champion" accolade. The Go Jetters (in the Vroomster) attempt to evade Glitch's Shrink Ray blasts, after they try to stop him, but this causes collateral damage when a tourist stand full of metallic-replica pyramid souvenirs is knocked over and the Sphinx is miniaturised, and in the end Xuli and the Vroomster are miniaturised. Xuli drives with her Vroomster and Lars (using the G.O. Mag) Xuli take the Shrink Ray off Grandmaster Glitch. The Grim-bots, with the miniaturized Pyramid, turn into rolling balls, with a high speed achieved by rolling down a pyramid's incline, in their attempt to escape Kyan and Foz who pursue them on their G.O. Boards, but they all end up colliding with Grandmaster Glitch, who gets shrunk (by the Shrink Ray's misfire), and the previously shrunken Pyramid to fall in amongst the scattered similarly-sized pyramid souvenirs. Lars works out which are the metal-replicas, by attracting them off with the G.O. Mag, and they then use the Shrink Ray to return Xuli and the Vroomster, the Sphinx, the Pyramid of Giza (ensuring it is aligned with the compass points), and Grandmaster Glitch (atop the pyramid), to their original sizes. The Go Jetters celebrate their victory with a souvenir selfie in front of the Giza pyramid complex. While Grandmaster Glitch is left stranded on the now normal-sized Pyramid of Giza, the Grim-bots separately celebrate their winning of the Grim HQ computer game's "Ultimate Champion" accolade for themselves, using one of the Pyramid souvenirs to complete the last fit-the-shape level.
3	3	"Stonehenge, England"	28 October 2015
After being debriefed by Ubercorn on some "Funky Facts" about Stonehenge (England), the Go Jetters arrive there 6 minutes before sunrise, on the summer solstice, the longest day of the year. Grandmaster Glitch follows them, when the passing of the Go Jetter's ship topples Grandmaster Glitch's night-long set-up of his Grim HQ domino fall game (5 dominos). Upon seeing Stonehenge, Grandmaster Glitch uses the kicking functionality of the Grimbler's Grim-Boot to make several attempts to topple the huge stones like dominos, with only some partial success, even with a run-up. In the Vroomster, Xuli distracts Grandmaster Glitch, while avoiding the Grim-Bots (in ball mode) that he kicks at her vehicles with the Grimbler's Grim-Boot, whilst Kyan jumps out to save a tourist and her tourist cart stall from being crushed by one of the falling stones. On foot, Lars (using a G.O. Ball click-on) and Foz (using a G.O. Giant) raise the stones into their original position, and eventually propel the Grimbler, with Grandmaster Glitch, out of the monument site and across the sky, using a G.O. Ball propelled stone pillar kick-back manoeuvre. The Go Jetters celebrate putting Stonehenge back into position, just in time for sunrise, with a Stonehenge sunrise selfie.
4	4	"The Sahara Desert, Africa"	29 October 2015
In the Sahara Desert of northern Africa, after his failure at making castles out of his plate of food aboard the Grim HQ, Grandmaster Glitch gets his Grim-Bots (using the Grimbler affixed with a set of bucket and spade arms) to start building a giant sand castle. Grandemaster Glitch (on an air mattress) uses an oasis as the sand castle's royal paddling pool, with the four surrounding sand castle walls preventing the thirsty local Touareg tribesmen and their camels from accessing it. After debriefing the Go Jetters about the Sahara Desert's "Funky Facts", Ubercorn assigns the Go Jetters a mission to destroy the sandcastle, but the Vroomster is buried in sand after crashing into a sand turret obstacle. After establishing that the castle's sand walls are too high to jump and that the Grimbots too quickly repair any castle wall breaches made by using the G.O. Force (Wind Power) click-on. Lars digs a tunnel under one of the sand castle's walls using a G.O. Fix (Drill-Mode) click-on, carefully avoiding the underground water that leads to the oasis. The drill tip pierces Grandmaster Glitch's air mattress, shooting him and his mattress over the sandcastle wall to collide with the Grimbler, sending it out of control. Kyan uses his gymnastic abilities to get acrobatically up to the vehicle's cockpit and hit the control panel's master switch, to turn the Grimbler off. Foz then uses the G.O. Force (Wind Power) click-on to blow the castle walls back into sand dunes, leaving Grandmaster Glitch without a castle, but allowing the thirsty local people to drink. The Go Jetters celebrate the completion of their mission with a Sahara selfie.
5	5	"Niagara Falls, Canada"	30 October 2015
Jetpad is almost out of battery, and they're going to a hydroelectric power station to refill when Grandmaster Glitch blocks the Niagara Falls to get muddy.
6	6	"Sydney Opera House, Australia"	3 November 2015
Grandmaster Glitch steals the Sydney Opera House to compete in a yacht race.
7	7	"The Statue of Liberty, United States"	10 November 2015
Grandmaster Glitch decides to customise the Statue of Liberty to make it look like him.
8	8	"The Brandenburg Gate, Germany"	17 November 2015
Grandmaster Glitch steals the Quadriga of the Brandenburg Gate to make himself a carousel.
9	9	"Lambert-Fisher Glacier, Antarctica"	24 November 2015
When making an ice statue of himself, Glitch threatens the Lambert Glacier.
10	10	"Chichen Itza, Mexico"	1 December 2015
Grandmaster Glitch's giant ball game threatens the Mexican pyramid El Castillo, Chichen Itza.
11	11	"The Great Wall of China"	21 March 2016
Glitch and his Grimbots threaten the Great Wall of China while racing on it.
12	12	"Leaning Tower of Pisa, Italy"	22 March 2016
The Go Jetters race to fix the Leaning Tower of Pisa thinking it has been glitched rather than always leaning. In this episode shows Grandmaster Glitch appears in the selfie with the Go-Jetters
13	13	"Lake Titicaca, South America"	23 March 2016
Grandmaster Glitch lands with a splash in Lake Titicaca in Bolivia, and there is an island with people on top!
14	14	"The Colosseum, Italy"	24 March 2016
Grandmaster Glitch goes to the Colosseum in Rome to race his grimbots.
15	15	"The Taj Mahal, India"	29 March 2016
The grimbots attach a bit of the Taj Mahal to GrimHQ, ruining its beautiful symmetry.
16	16	"Mount Etna, Italy"	30 March 2016
Grandmaster Glitch makes popcorn in Mount Etna, but blocks the volcano, endangering farms nearby.
17	17	"Table Mountain, South Africa"	31 March 2016
The grimbots give Table Mountain in South Africa a snowy peak, threatening its rare plants.
18	18	"The Northern Lights, Finland"	1 April 2016
Ubercorn is excited to see the Northern Lights in Lapland, but Glitch's Grunge Grimbler covers them with smoke.
19	19	"The Amazon rainforest, South America"	6 June 2016
Grandmaster Glitch stops the rain in the Amazon rainforest to have a picnic, while the Go Jetters try get the croak of a tree frog for Ubercorn's animal sound collection.
20	20	"The Dead Sea, Middle East"	7 June 2016
The Go Jetters are relaxing by the Dead Sea in Israel on their day off when Grandmaster Glitch causes a catastrophe by dumping barrels of custard onto the sea, trapping some tourists (and himself) in the hot sun.
21	21	"The Forbidden City, China"	8 June 2016
The Go Jetters have to stop some runaway Chinese drums rolled out by His Grimness Emperor Glitch from rolling into the Forbidden City in Beijing.
22	22	"The Wieliczka Salt Mine, Poland"	9 June 2016
The Go Jetters have to save the famous Salt Statues from floods due to Glitch's digging for salt for his chips.
23	23	"Giant's Causeway, Northern Ireland"	10 June 2016
A giant Grandmaster Glitch is causing trouble at the Giant's Causeway, and Xuli is trying to find new ways to use her G.O. Dive.
24	24	"The Golden Gate Bridge, United States"	13 June 2016
The Go Jetters have to act fast when one of the foghorns of San Francisco's Golden Gate Bridge go missing.
25	25	"Komodo Island, Indonesia"	14 June 2016
Grandmaster Glitch supersizes a Komodo dragon, thinking that he can tame a dragon like a knight of fairy tales.
26	26	"Big Ben, England"	15 June 2016
On New Year's Eve, Grandmaster Glitch removes the Big Ben bell from the Palace of Westminster in London so he can have his beauty sleep—the Go Jetters have to get it back in place to chime at midnight.
27	27	"The Strokkur Geyser, Iceland"	16 June 2016
A risk of earthquake needs sorting when a geyser gets stuck by Glitch, thinking geysers are a fun ride.
28	28	"The Aqueduct of Segovia, Spain"	17 June 2016
The Go Jetters have to stop Glitch when he changes the aqueduct into a giant water slide.
29	29	"Rio de Janeiro, Brazil"	5 August 2016
Grandmaster Glitch stopped the samba at the Rio Carnival.
30	30	"Mount Everest, Asia"	19 September 2016
The Go Jetters are enjoying a calm day, except for Kyan, who wants to go on an adventure. He settles on climbing Mount Everest. Grandmaster Glitch is busy working on his moustache and crashes into the mountain. The Grimbots play in the snow and are joined by Glitch, who makes a giant snowball that starts rolling down the mountain with him on it. the Go Jetters stop the snowball from hitting some mountaineers by using GO Shield and GO Force. The Grimbots have escaped in GrimHQ, leaving Glitch cold in the snow. The Go Jetters rescue him and he presses a button in the JetPad leading to a funny selfie.
31	31	"Loch Ness, Scotland"	20 September 2016
A Grimbot is spying on the Go Jetters as they read stories about Nessie, the Loch Ness monster; they all go to Loch Ness. The Go Jetters view a tranquil loch with a fisherman in a boat. All of a sudden the fisherman is dragged along by an unknown creature. He finally lets go of his rod and Xuli, using GO Dive, goes to investigate. She takes a photo and it is Grandmaster Glitch in the Grimbler. Glitch continues to dive towards the bottom hunting for Nessie, but the Grimbler begins to break apart and it shoots back to the surface, spilling oil. The Go Jetters use GO Grab and GO Fix to get some of the nearby peat to soak up the oil and put it back in the Grimbler. In the selfie there is a splash which indicate Nessie might be real.
32	32	"The Grand Canyon, United States"	21 September 2016
Kyan is wire-walking across the Grand Canyon as part of the GO Jetters training. Grandmaster Glitch fires his own wire across the canyon onto the Grand Canyon Skywalk to try to beat Kyan; he cheats by using magnetic boots to walk across the wire. The Grimbots watch in admiration and play very loud music which causes the wires to vibrate leaving Kyan and Glitch hanging in danger, along with tourists on the Skywalk. Lars and Foz use GO Boots to support the Skywalk and to stop the loud music in the Grimbler. GO Fix is used by Lars to fix the Skywalk. Kyan then completes his wire walk with Grandmaster Glitch on his shoulders. Kyan gets a double GO Jetters award for completing the wire-walk and for breaking bread with Grandmaster Glitch.
33	33	"Easter Island, Chile"	22 September 2016
Grandmaster Glitch is on holiday on Easter Island. He complains that there are too many tourists taking photos of the Moai statues and disturbing his rest. Glitch gets the Grimbots to build a new statue to distract the tourists but they are not impressed—the Grimbots have built a large pink poodle! Glitch breaks it up, and the broken pieces roll down a hill towards some tourists. The GO Jetters save them, and also save the statues using GO Giant and GO Roll. One final piece of the poodle statue hits Glitch and knocks him off his chair.
34	34	"The Parthenon, Greece"	23 September 2016
After watching one, Grandmaster Glitch starts making his own James Bond film based on him defeating the Go Jetters, set at the Parthenon in Athens, with the Grimbots dressed-up as the Go Jetters team. To improve the realism of their cardboard Vroomster prop, Glitch pretends his Grimbler is broken to enable the Grimbots to steal the real Vroomster from the Go Jetters when they come to his rescue. The Go Jetters prevent the Grimbot's manoeuvres in the stolen vehicle from flattening the Parthenon. Xuli regains the Grimbler by tricking the Grimbots into thinking that the ejector button is an accelerator. The Go-Jetters watch the resultant film, which has made Glitch a laughing stock.
35	35	"St Basil's Cathedral, Russia"	26 September 2016
It is Grandmaster Glitch's birthday. The Grimbots make him a rubbish cake as he wanted one with green icing which looks a little like a castle. The Grimbots cover St Basil's Cathedral in green icing and Glitch loves it. Due to the cold weather the icing sets hard and traps some Cossack dancers inside. The Go Jetters come to help but the Grimbots trap Lars and Foz in icing. Kyan distracts Glitch by joining some Cossack dancers to perform a birthday dance. Xuli uses GO Force set to heat to rescue Lars and Foz, who join her in melting the icing on the cathedral. Shortly after that, the distraction falls apart as Kyan slips and accidentally shows his star! It all melts and sends a tidal wave of icing into Red Square. They then have to use GO Force set to cold to freeze the icing, and it traps Glitch. The Grimbots have to cut him out and carry him away.
36	36	"Tarbela Dam, Pakistan"	27 September 2016
When Grandmaster Glitch steals one of the Go-Jetters' Click-ons, the forecast isn't good for the Tarbela Dam.
37	37	"Mount Rushmore, United States"	28 September 2016
The Grimbots add Glitch's face to those of the presidents on Mount Rushmore.
38	38	"Caernarfon Castle, Wales"	29 September 2016
The Go Jetters retrieve Xuli's flying trophy from Caernarfon Castle (also known as Carnarvon Castle).
39	39	"The Great Barrier Reef, Australia"	30 September 2016
The team dives into action as Grandmaster Glitch's treasure hunt endangers the Great Barrier Reef.
40	40	"The North Pole, Arctic Ocean (Christmas Special)"	14 December 2016
The Go Jetters visit the North Pole on Christmas Eve, but disaster strikes as they discover Grandmaster Glitch has borrowed Santa's sleigh!
41	41	"Hong Kong, China"	28 January 2017
The team spring into action when Glitch's mini-master toys invade Hong Kong Harbour.
42	42	"Waitomo Glowworm Caves, New Zealand"	13 February 2017
It's Go Jetters glow when Glitch uses some glowworms for his disco pizzazz in New Zealand.
43	43	"Lake Retba, Senegal"	14 February 2017
The team gets all shook up when Glitch sucks up the pink water of Senegal's Milkshake Lake.
44	44	"The Paddy Fields of China"	15 February 2017
The Go Jetters swing into action when Glitch uses real landmarks for his crazy golf course.
45	45	"Cappadocia, Turkey"	16 February 2017
A game of hide-and-seek threatens to topple a hoodoo of Cappadocia in Turkey.
46	46	"Maasai Mara National Park, Kenya"	17 February 2017
The team roars into action as Glitch tries to take a selfie with a lion in the Maasai Mara.
47	47	"Gobi Desert, Mongolia"	20 February 2017
Glitch's giant drill causes a dino-disaster for the team's fossil hunt in the Gobi Desert.
48	48	"Bioluminescent Bay, Puerto Rico"	21 February 2017
Glitch threatens the luminous creatures at Puerto Mosquito, Mosquito Bay when he is given a bath by his Grimbots.
49	49	"Blue Mountains, Jamaica"	22 February 2017
Trouble brews in Jamaica when Glitch's campfire threatens a coffee plantation. It'll take a mega jet of water to put it out.
50	50	"Jigokudani Monkey Park, Japan"	23 February 2017
The Go Jetters fly to the rescue in Japan, as Glitch gets up to his usual monkey business.
51	51	"The Nazca Lines, Peru"	24 February 2017
The Go Jetters race to protect ancient artwork in Peru when Glitch erases the Nazca Lines.

=== Series 2 (2017–2018) ===
No. overall	No. in season	Title	First aired
52	1	"Petra, Jordan"	18 September 2017
The Go Jetters have to save the ancient city of Petra when Glitch's Grimber gets jammed, causing an earthquake that shakes Petra, which could damage the fragile rock.
53	2	"The Matterhorn, Italy and Switzerland"	19 September 2017
Glitch puts the Go Jetters and other mountaineers in danger when he decides to descend Mount Matterhorn. While Kyan and Foz are trying to test the new GO climb.
54	3	"Bonneville Salt Flats, United States"	20 September 2017
Xuli and Glitch go head to head as they try to beat the Go Jet Academy land speed record.
55	4	"Rainforests of Sumatra, Indonesia"	21 September 2017
The Go Jetters must save the world's stinkiest plant from becoming Glitch's new perfume. Hold on to your noses, Go Jetters!
56	5	"Go Jet Academy: Artificial reef"	22 September 2017
Kyan, Lars and Foz pick up litter on the Academy beach after a storm, while Xuli dives down to check the coral reef. She spots something in the murky depths: a huge rusty submarine lies across the reef, and the moustache on the bow means it must belong to Grandmaster Glitch. What's worse, it's leaking oil!
57	6	"Machu Picchu, Peru"	25 September 2017
The Go Jetters head to the ancient Peruvian city of Machu Picchu to watch Kyan compete in the Inca Trail Marathon, but a Grimbot is bouncing down the trail, and it's grasped Kyan!
58	7	"Avenue of the Baobabs, Madagascar"	26 September 2017
A baby lemur needs rescuing when Glitch's HQ crashes into the baobabs.
59	8	"Venice, Italy"	27 September 2017
Grandmaster Glitch demands the Grimbots find somewhere with no cars so he can practice riding his bike without stabilisers.
60	9	"Seattle Space Needle, United States"	28 September 2017
The team goes where no Go Jetter has gone before, when Glitch tries to launch the Seattle Space Needle into space by attaching huge rocket boosters.
61	10	"Go Jet Academy: Hailstorm"	29 September 2017
The Go Jetters join Ubercorn in the Go Jet Academy to try out a brand new click-on: the G.O. Vac, a super vacuum that can suck up bad weather.
62	11	"Harbin Ice City, China"	2 October 2017
When Grim HQ's heating gets stuck on, Glitch looks for a cold place to land and cool down.
63	12	"Dover, England"	3 October 2017
The Go Jetters arrive at the White Cliffs of Dover in England, to cheer Kyan as he finishes a cross-channel swim, but a large cloud of dust blocks his way to the shore.
64	13	"Central Park, New York City"	4 October 2017
Glitch is in New York to see a Broadway show, but can't find anywhere to leave the Grimbler. Then he stumbles on Central Park and decides to build his own car park there. Meanwhile, the Go Jetters drop Kyan off nearby, so he can practice his fantastic gymnastics in the park. Kyan discovers a queue of cars making their way across the grass, with a Grimbot traffic warden directing them towards a huge Grim car park. He tries to stop them, but the Grimbots attempt to shrink him with their size ray. As Xuli, Lars and Foz enjoy the view from the Statue of Liberty, they spot a blanket of smog covering the New York skyline. Xuli calls Kyan to find out what's going on and Kyan explains that Glitch's car park is causing the smog to build. Ubercorn sends Lars and Foz to suck up the smog, and Foz uses the size ray to shrink the car park.
65	14	"Bullet train, Japan"	5 October 2017
In Japan, Grandmaster Glitch is at a railway station, wondering where his Grimbots have gone. Some excited bleeps further down the platform reveal that they've jumped into the driver's cabin of a high-speed bullet train and are happily pressing all the buttons!
66	15	"Go Jet Academy: Wind Power"	6 October 2017
It's a very windy day at the Go Jet Academy as Jetpad comes in to land, zooming past the academy's windfarm turbines.
67	16	"Gua Rusa, Borneo"	28 October 2017
When Grandmaster Glitch discovers his Halloween pumpkin isn't as big as the Grimbots' one, he goes in search of some fertilizer to help it grow.
68	17	"Christmas Island, Indian Ocean"	13 December 2017
Grandmaster Glitch thinks all his Christmases have come at once when his Grimbots take him to visit Christmas Island in the Indian Ocean.
69	18	"Terracotta Army, China"	15 January 2018
Ubercorn shuts down Glitch's raucous rock performance leaving the Grandmaster determined to find a brand new crowd who'll love his loud music. He decides to travel to Xi'an in China so that the 1,000-strong Terracotta Army can be his adoring audience.
70	19	"Panama Canal, Panama"	16 January 2018
Grandmaster Glitch is late for the European Moustache of the Year award ceremony, and even worse, he's broken down!
71	20	"Tower Bridge, London"	17 January 2018
Grandmaster Glitch is visiting London and spots the perfect souvenir at a riverside stall—a majestic hat that was clearly made for a Grandmaster! But when he finds he has no money, he decides to raise some by working as a tour guide on the River Thames. Xuli, Kyan, Lars and Foz are also visiting London while Lars helps to fix his favourite his bridge—Tower Bridge. Ubercorn explains that this amazing bridge can be raised to allow tall river traffic to pass safely beneath. While Lars goes to fix Tower Bridge, Xuli, Kyan and Foz jump onto a riverboat tour, unaware that they are in fact boarding Grim HQ! Before they can jump ship, Glitch sets sail, giving out his very own glitchy 'facts' and spending his customers' money on his Union Jack hat. But when the hat blows away in the breeze and Glitch gives chase, he puts tourists, boats and Tower Bridge itself in danger.
72	21	"Tepui Mountains, Venezuela"	18 January 2018
Kyan, Lars and Foz are climbing a Tepui in Venezuela, with Xuli exploring this amazing place in her Vroomster. Xuli and Glitch crash into a sinkhole in Venezuela.
73	22	"Go Jet Academy: Biogas Power"	19 January 2018
Glitch is excited when Lars refits the Grimbler with new, clean biogas boosters that could make it even faster than the Vroomster!
74	23	"Go Jet Academy: Hurricane Rescue"	22 January 2018
Grim HQ struggles through the sky above the Atlantic Ocean, fighting against the powerful winds of a hurricane. But a Grimbot gets stuck in it! But Grim HQ is broken down, so Glitch "borrows" Jet Pad, with Foz inside—it's down to the other Go Jetters to save him!
75	24	"The Valley of Balls, Kazakhstan"	23 January 2018
The Go Jetters travel to the Valley of Balls in Kazakhstan, where they find thousands of rocks which are almost perfectly round. Meanwhile, Grandmaster Glitch is seeking the ideal ball to use to practice his bowling – something big and heavy.
76	25	"Gliding, Argentina"	24 January 2018
The Go Jet cadets are taking to the skies in Argentina in an attempt to pass their academy gliding test with Xuli guiding them. But Glitch joins in with his Grim-glider (or Grimbler) and races them to the finish. The Grimbots' finish line is activated too early, putting Xuli, Glitch, and the xuli cadets to great danger.
77	26	"Nomads, Mongolia"	25 January 2018
Grandmaster Glitch is out on a camping expedition in Mongolia. There's not much around except a group of Mongolian nomads – people who travel around the country with their animals, camping in amazing tents called gers. But he does things that the nomads don't like. Then he accidentally takes their horses! The Go Jetters fix this Glitch.
78	27	"Go Jet Academy: Compass Navigators"	26 January 2018
Kyan and Foz are working on their compass navigation skills and need to find the North Tower within a magnificent maze in order to pass their academy test. However, Glitch uses a drill to dig north so he can pass the test before them, eventually putting them, and Xuli, Lars and Ubercorn, in the North Tower in danger.
79	28	"Wolong Panda Reserve, China"	16 February 2018
Lars and Foz are in the Wolong Nature Reserve in China, taking care of the 2,000 pandas that live in the wild there. Grandmaster Glitch was taking all the pandas' bamboo.
80	29	"Go Jet Academy: Map Readers"	28 May 2018
At the Go Jet Academy, Ubercorn has found an old map that leads to the GO Dome of the Ancients. So the race is on. Grandmaster Glitch takes a photo of the Go Jetters' map and tries to find the ancient dome before Xuli, Kyan, Lars and Foz
81	30	"The Boreal Forest, Canada"	29 May 2018
Grandmaster Glitch's Grimbots really need some cuddles, so it's down to Glitch to find them a new teddy bear!
82	31	"Timgad Ruins, Algeria"	30 May 2018
The Go Jetters travel to Algeria in north Africa to check out the ancient Timgad Ruins, but Glitch makes a game out of them and the ruins. So it's down to Ubercorn to save the day.
83	32	"Everglades National Park, Florida, US"	31 May 2018
The Go Jetters are visiting the Everglades National Park in Florida.
84	33	"The Sphinx, Egypt"	1 June 2018
Grandmaster Glitch is in need of a holiday, so he takes his Grimbots to Egypt for some rest and relaxation. But after they bury Glitch in the sand for fun, they bury the Great Sphinx. But as the Go Jetters try to help, their G.O. Forces mix up a sandstorm!
85	34	"Go Jet Academy: Mudslide"	4 June 2018
It's a very rainy day at the Go Jet Academy and the Go Jetters are in the training domes teaching the cadets some crucial Go Jetter skills.
86	35	"The Leshan Giant Buddha, China"	5 June 2018
Inspired by the statue of the Giant Buddha of Leshan, Ubercorn teaches the Go Jetters all about mindfulness to help them to concentrate as he gives them a meditation, even Kyan managed to stay still for so long!
87	36	"Kinderdijk, Netherlands"	6 June 2018
It's a whirlwind of windmill excitement as the Go Jetters travel to Kinderdijk in the Netherlands to celebrate National Mill Day.
88	37	"The Great Pacific Garbage Patch"	7 June 2018
A storm washes much plastic litter onto the Go Jet Academy beach. And it all started from the Great Pacific Garbage Patch. But when the Go Jetters borrow Jet Pad without Ubercorn for a mission to try and fix the Great Pacific Garbage Patch, they soon need Ubercorn and Grandmaster Glitch to help save the day. Note: This is the only episode with a photo of the Great Pacific Garbage Patch instead of a souvenir selfie.
89	38	"The Great Mosque of Djenné, Africa"	8 June 2018
Grandmaster Glitch has been invited to Djenne in Mali to visit the people and to see one of his favourite things at work – mud! But although he was trying to help, Glitch's giant Grim-brella endangers the mosque. Luckily the Go Jetters are there to save the day.
90	39	"Wimbledon, England"	2 July 2018
The Go Jetters are at Centre Court in Wimbledon, London, to watch the world's most famous tennis tournament! But just as they settle in to watch the doubles final, Grandmaster Glitch and his Grimbots gatecrash the court. Glitch is determined to win Wimbledon, but he is not adhering to any of the rules, and the umpire wants him to leave. But Glitch is staying put until he can play some tennis and win the tournament, so Xuli and Kyan head on to Centre Court to take him on! Even though he is cheating, Glitch is still losing. He's had enough and finally decides to leave, but there's just one problem—the Grimbots take to Grim HQ to pull Centre Court right up and out of Wimbledon! Xuli, Kyan, Glitch and the umpire are still on the court as it flies over London, nearly crashing into the Houses of Parliament and Tower Bridge! It's down to the Go Jetters to rescue Glitch and the umpire and get Centre Court back to Wimbledon.
91	40	"Cave of the Crystals, Mexico"	20 August 2018
While in Mexico, Glitch takes a shortcut through the difficult-to-get-to Cave of the Crystals, with some of the biggest crystals in the world!
92	41	"Bishop Rock Isles of Scilly"	21 August 2018
It's a dark night and Glitch is flying his Grim HQ over the sea around the Isles of Scilly. He's in the middle of reading a bedtime story to his Grimbots when his lamp breaks! He needs a new light, and when he sees the Bishop Rock Lighthouse in the distance he demands that the Grimbots get him the bulb. Meanwhile, Xuli, Lars and Foz are flying the Vroomster nearby. They almost crash into the lighthouse, and Lars realises that the bulb is missing. Glitch and the Grimbots have taken it and turned it on inside Grim HQ. But the new light is so bright that Glitch can't see anything, and Grim HQ goes out of control!
93	42	"Go Jet Academy: Irrigation"	22 August 2018
It's farming time at the Go Jet Academy and the Go Jetters are growing corn in a big field. Their crops need watering and so the team are putting up an irrigation system which will water all the crops.
94	43	"Bird Migration: Spain and Africa"	23 August 2018
The Go Jetters are on the Strait of Gibraltar between Spain and Africa, working with a team of conservationists to track and follow a group of baby storks on their journey from Spain to Africa.
95	44	"Whistler Mountain, Canada"	24 August 2018
The Go Jetters are on Whistler Mountain in Canada, doing some skiing and checking out the amazing cable car. Kyan and Foz are about to have a go at the Go Jet Ski Challenge when Grandmaster Glitch comes along and wants to show them how it's done—but the sneaky Grandmaster cheats by using his jet pack to power him forward! But Glitch's jet pack is too powerful and propels him right into the cable car that Xuli and Lars are riding in. The Grimbots try to help by messing with the controls of the cable car in the control room, but they end up breaking everything and the cars stop moving. Xuli, Lars and Glitch are left hanging on to the cable car high above the ground and need urgent help!
96	45	"Solar E-Glitch"	27 August 2018
At the Go Jet Academy, the Go Jetters are about to watch one of nature's most spectacular events – a solar eclipse.
97	46	"Korowai Treehouses, Indonesia"	28 August 2018
The Go Jetters have been invited by the Korowai tribe to visit their village in the rainforest of Papua in Indonesia.
98	47	"Go Jet Academy: Volcanic Island"	29 August 2018
Grandmaster Glitch is drilling into the ground below the ocean near Academy Island, looking for bubbly mud that is heated up by an underground volcano.
99	48	"Chocolate Hills, Philippines"	30 August 2018
The Grimbots discover a place called the Chocolate Hills on Bohol Island in the Philippines and take Grandmaster Glitch there.
100	49	"Go Jet Academy: Global Gameshow"	31 August 2018
It's the Go Jetters as you've never seen them before as they take part in a disco-dazzling around the world gameshow! Xuli and Foz are on Team Go Jetter and Kyan and Grandmaster Glitch are on Team Glitch as they go head to head to see who will win. Lars and Ubercorn are the quizmasters asking the questions in this ultimate geographic quiz.
101	50	"Horsetail Fall, California"	4 December 2018
The Go Jetters want to watch the Firefall but Glitch freezes the lake to save his snowman.
102	51	"Ilulissat, Greenland"	5 December 2018
Glitch loses his teddy, Cuddles, which ends up with him creating an iceberg that heads towards the town.
103	52	"Sámi Reindeer Herding, Norway"	6 December 2018
Glitch accidentally loses control of his Grimbler, scaring and splitting up a herd of reindeer.

=== Series 3 (2019–2020) ===
No. overall	No. in season	Title	First aired
104	1	"Honey Bee Hijack"	26 August 2019
The Go Jet Academy holds a honey contest, and while Xuli and Kyan collect honey from around the globe, and a new cadet named Tala. She hopes to win despite only having a single jar. But when Glitch hatches a plan to kidnap all of the world's bees, the Go Jetters must travel across the world to stop him. Note: This episode was aired as a 22-minute special.
105	2	"Hollywood, United States"	27 August 2019
When Kyan and Glitch star in a Hollywood movie, the Go Jetters swap autograph books for Click-Ons to save the Hollywood sign. Get ready for lights, camera and much action!
106	3	"London Sewers Fatberg, England"	28 August 2019
While Xuli, Lars and Kelly go into the sewers to help keep London clean, Glitch and the Grimbots create some enormous blockages after flushing thousands of wet wipes down the toilet. It's up to the Go Jetters to clear away the fatberg Glitch has created, clean the sewers and save the city's streets.
107	4	"Monteverde Cloud Forest, Costa Rica"	29 August 2019
The Go Jetters are in the Monteverde Cloud Forest, exploring the trees and hoping for a glimpse of the beautiful quetzal. But upset over the disintegration of his trophy duster, Glitch causes havoc when he orders his Grimbots to search for the quetzal's feathers. The Go Jetters save a rare bird's nest and find a lost trophy.
108	5	"The Continent of Africa"	30 August 2019
Glitch's plans to help Tala discover facts about Africa go wrong when they are stranded in different parts of the continent. It's up to the Go Jetters to save them from the jungles of Congo and a hippo-infested river.
109	6	"The Continent of Europe"	2 September 2019
Tala decides to focus a class project on her uncle Glitch's souvenir selfies from Europe – but little does she know that all of his pictures are atrocious. A panicking Glitch gets help from the Go Jetters, and using a series of cardboard cut-outs they start to take photos all across the continent.
110	7	"Go Jetters Heroes: Polar Explorers"	3 September 2019
When Kyan and Glitch race to the South Pole, Glitch's loyal Grimbots steal the pole's marker to help Glitch win. But when Glitch orders them to return it, they find themselves lost and trapped in the ice – and the Go Jetters must spring into action to rescue them.
111	8	"Middle of the World City, Ecuador"	4 September 2019
After hearing about how the Monument to the Equator in Ciudad Mitad del Mundo is in the wrong location, Glitch and his Grimbots pretend to be the Go Jetters and move the monument onto the equator. But when things start to go wrong, Glitch must learn that some glitches are fine the way they are.
112	9	"Solar Race, Australia"	5 September 2019
Glitch's hopes of winning a solar-powered race across the Australian outback are foiled when he crashes the Glitchster in the middle of the night. With the solar battery dead, Kyan and Glitch are stranded with no water and no way out. It's up to the Go Jetters to find them and save the day.
113	10	"Go Jetters Heroes: Amelia Earhart"	6 September 2019
Inspired by her hero Amelia Earhart, Xuli attempts a solo flight across the Atlantic Ocean in a vintage plane. But when accidental stowaway Tala's plans to make the engine more eco-friendly put the plane in danger, they must rely on the Go Jetters to get them out of trouble.
114	11	"Tulip Fields, Netherlands"	9 September 2019
Xuli and Foz are in the Vroomster – but this time Foz is at the controls on a flying lesson. The pair have a rough landing in a tulip field in the Netherlands. Luckily the Vroomster doesn't have a scratch on it. Xuli and Foz are impressed with the tulip fields. Kyan, Lars and Ubercorn join over comms - it reminds Kyan of a rainbow! They all plan to meet up at the Flower Parade later. Meanwhile Glitch is in a nearby barn, instructing the Grimbots to fetch more tulips for a giant float which looks just like Glitch! Xuli and Foz spot a Grimbot driving a harvester, which is tearing up tons of tulips and rush to the Vroomster to stop it. Xuli flies the Vroomster to the harvester and Foz jumps aboard. The Grimbot insists he has permission to cut all the flowers but Foz doesn't believe it and tries to wrestle the steering wheel from the Grimbot. Xuli heads to the barn and discovers Glitch, Tala and Johan the flower farmer happily assembling Glitch's statue. It turns out Johan has given permission for Glitch and Tala to use the flowers to build their float – whoops! There isn't a Glitch after all and the Go Jetters have made a mistake. Foz spots a big button in the harvester. He leans in to push it, the Grimbot notices at the last second and tries to stop him but it's too late. Foz presses the button, and both Foz and the Grimbot are ejected from the harvester and fall into a mud pile - they're stuck fast! Xuli, Glitch and Tala have run out of the barn to see the driverless harvester coming straight towards them. Xuli calls up Click Ons for her and Tala – they use G.O shield to redirect the harvester to stop it crashing into the barn. It works – but now the harvester is on course to hit the greenhouses! Xuli and Tala turn to see Glitch appear from out of the Grimbler - he has his Grim Mag on, ready to save the day. But Glitch is pulled towards the metal harvester and Xuli is dragged with them too - Grimbles! Foz manages to free himself from the mud and flies the Vroomster to catch up with the harvester, Xuli and Glitch. After a few failed attempts Foz manages to nudge the harvester off course and away from the greenhouse; the workers are safe. But now the out of control machine is heading towards some Grimbots which are still stuck in the mud. Tala drives the float between the Grimbots and the harvester, ready to sacrifice her hard work to save her Uncle's precious Grimbots. Foz summons all his new found flying skills and manages to lift the harvester; freeing Xuli and again breaking bread with Glitch! With everyone saved they head to the flower parade where Foz puts his new-found driving skills to good use by driving Glitch and Tala's beautiful float.
115	12	"Himalayan Heroes, Nepal"	10 September 2019
Foz and Glitch follow footprints on a snowy mountain in Nepal in the hope of finding a yeti.
116	13	"Monkey Bay, Thailand"	11 September 2019
Glitch's plans to open a hotel on an unspoilt beach in Thailand go horribly wrong when a group of macaque monkeys steal his Grim-o-freeze gun. It doesn't take long for the trouble to spread across Monkey Bay, so the Go Jetters leap into action to help save the beach, its tourists and Glitch himself.
117	14	"Cheddar Gorge, England"	12 September 2019
The Go Jetters are exploring Cheddar Gorge and enjoying its rocky slopes. But Glitch, learning about the town's love of cheese, pays a visit to the gorge in order to share his fondue with the locals. This backfires horribly when he accidentally floods the gorge with the cheesy mixture. It's up to the Go Jetters to rescue the tourists, the sheep and the Grimbots. Foz overcomes his fear of heights and save a lost lamb.
118	15	"Mountain Gorillas, The Democratic Republic of the Congo"	13 September 2019
When a cold-ridden Glitch's sneezing breaks his TV, the Grimbots take him to the Virunga National Park in the Democratic Republic of the Congo to see a real mountain gorilla. But Glitch doesn't realise how dangerous his cold germs can be, so the Go Jetters will have to stop him from making a baby gorilla sick – all while trying to keep it safe from dangerous traps left by hunters.
119	16	"Go Jetter or No Jetter?"	2 December 2019
After the others finish constructing the Academy bridge without him, Foz is upset; he doesn't know where he fits into the group and starts to think that he isn't needed any more. He doesn't have Xuli's ability as a pilot, Kyan's gymnastic and Lars' mechanical knowledge. But when the new bridge starts developing problems, Foz must rise to the challenge to help prevent a catastrophe.
120	17	"Mariana Trench, the Pacific Ocean"	3 December 2019
With the help of his hero Ron Allum, Lars plans to dive to the bottom of the Mariana Trench in a submersible called the Deep Sea Challenger. Glitch plans to beat him there by sending a Grimbot in his Grimsub, but it can't withstand the heavy pressure of the water. Xuli and Lars must work together to mount a rescue operation at the bottom of the sea.
121	18	"Svalbard Global Seed Vault, Norway"	4 December 2019
Ubercorn and Glitch head to the Svalbard Global Seed Vault, hoping to keep some seeds from Glitch's rare fruit tree safe for the future. But, just like when they were cadets together, the two of them get into trouble. Glitch accidentally crashes the Grimbler into the vault, and its hot engines start melting the ice that keeps the seeds cool. With the Go Jetters delayed by a malfunctioning Jet Pad, the Ubercorn and Glitch save the scientists, the vault and Glitch's rare seeds.
122	19	"Shopping Shenanigans, Istanbul, Turkey"	5 December 2019
While shopping in Istanbul's Grand Bazaar, Glitch wishes he could have some of everything. Hearing about the wishes granted by the Hen's Eye Column in an underground water store, the Basilica Cistern, Glitch heads beneath the earth. But when he gets his thumb stuck inside the column, he ends up bringing the entire cistern close to collapse. Foz saves the ancient structure without the help of click-ons.
123	20	"Go Jet Academy: Sea Arch Escape"	6 December 2019
When Xuli tries to beat Ubercorn's flying record, she accidentally damages a sea arch that holds up a rock formation. Inspired by Xuli's piloting skills, Tala convinces her to show her some tricks in the Grimbler, but disaster strikes when Tala traps herself under the fragile arch. The Go Jetters must race to save the day before the arch collapses.
124	21	"Go Jet Academy: Ghost Crabs"	9 December 2019
Glitch damages the Academy crabs' habitat when he takes all the sand from their beach.
125	22	"The Salmon Run, Alaska"	10 December 2019
After Ubercorn teaches the Go Jetters about the funky facts of the Alaskan Salmon Run, they travel to the Kenai River (Alaska) to see it for themselves. In an attempt to impress his niece (Tala), who admires those who build fish ladders to assist the Salmon on their journey, Grandmaster Glitch travels there as well and attempts to create a "fish taxi service", using the Grim HQ to scoop salmon up and carry them upstream. However, the Grim HQ crashes into the river and blocks it, due to being weighed down by the water and fish it carried, and bears start gathering at the sight of the conjugating fish, who are now unable to progress up the river. Upon the Go Jetters discovering this, Xuli unsuccessfully attempts to use the Vroomster to pull the Grim HQ out of the river, but breaks the Grim HQ and jams the Vroomster in a tree instead. Kyan unsuccessfully attempts to encourage the salmon to swim downstream out of danger by dressing up as a salmon (using a sleeping bag and flippers), however, this ploy does successfully lure away the bears (with Kyan using the G.O. Jump click-on to avoid being captured). Xuli, Lars and Foz create a fish ladder (using G.O. Force and G.O. Shield Click-Ons), so the salmon can leap up and over Grim HQ, then Kyan uses his gymnastics skills to show the Salmon how to ascend the newly created temporary fish ladder. The Grim HQ becomes light enough to move, after the water and salmon are released, allowing Xuli (who has unjammed the Vroomster) to lift the Grim HQ out of the stream. With the river now unblocked, the Go Jetters (including Kyan still dressed as a salmon) celebrate with a selfie as the next group of salmon leap up the river's waterfall unhindered.
126	23	"Tomatina Festival, Bunol, Spain"	11 December 2019
The Go Jetters fix their own 'Glitch' at the biggest food fight in the world.
127	24	"Go Jet Academy: Whale Rescue"	12 December 2019
The Go Jetters race to the rescue when a pod of whales becomes stranded at the Academy.
128	25	"Chinese New Year Dragon Dance Drama"	25 January 2020
Even if Kyan is afraid of Chinese Dragons, he is invited to perform a dragon dance for Chinese New Year in Beijing Glitch decides to build a fire-breathing dragon robot for the parade and the Go Jetters need to stop it.
129	26	"Holi Festival of Colour India"	9 March 2020
The Go Jetters Ubercorn and Glitch all head to the Dwarkadhish Temple in Dwarka, India, for the Holi Festival of Colour. This Hindu celebration involves people throwing a colourful powder called gulal all over one another. Glitch plans to bring a huge flag he and Ubercorn made as cadets for the top of the temple. But after he accidentally washes all the colour out of it, he orders his Grimbots to bring him gulal powder to dye it again. The Grimbots do this rather too well, however, and soon there is no more powder left for the festival! It's up to the Go Jetters to fix Glitch's mistake and save the celebration.
130	27	"Global warming, The Arctic Ocean"	22 April 2020
The Go Jetters are at the top of the world, helping Professor Wave research polar bears in the Arctic Ocean. Climate change is causing the polar bears's ice home to melt away. Although they get to see a wild polar bear called Kalik, trouble strikes when Kyan and Foz waste too much energy on heat and run down the ship's power. With a chunk of melting ice heading towards them, the Go Jetters see the perils caused by climate change first hand, and they spring into action to find a way to save the ship.
131	28	"Go Jet Academy: Rainbow"	18 May 2020
Glitch tries to make his own rainbow but creates a huge rain storm instead. After a rainbow appears over the Go Jet Academy, Glitch becomes fascinated with the legend of a pot of gold appearing at the end of it. He tries to create his own, bigger rainbow, ignoring Ubercorn's warnings that a rainbow's end can never be reached. When he instead causes a huge storm to appear, the Go Jetters must work fast to stop the Academy from flooding.
132	29	"Ronda Reunion, Spain"	19 May 2020
Xuli and Foz are on a holiday adventure, cracking clues to find Xuli's long-lost friend.
133	30	"Mud Volcano, Azerbaijan"	20 May 2020
Lars and Glitch's plan to power their new machine with methane gas has explosive results. Lars and Glitch team up and build a fruit-picking machine that runs on methane in order to help with the Academy harvest. When they run low on fuel, they head to the natural methane deposits of Azerbaijan to stock up. But when the Grimbots take too much methane from a huge volcano, the Go Jetters must work to protect the area's tourists and save the Grimbots from a fiery explosion.
134	31	"The Pan-American Highway, Panama"	21 May 2020
The Go Jetters are enjoying a relaxing trip along the world's longest road, the Pan-American Highway, when the road suddenly comes to a stop. They have reached the Darien Gap in Panama, a protected area of great wild beauty. They head off on foot - but little do they know that Glitch is also travelling on the same road and has no intention of leaving his vehicle at all! Can Xuli, Kyan, Lars and Foz save this important habitat and protect the local sloths?
135	32	"Go Jet Academy: Lightning Bolt Blackout"	22 May 2020
Xuli, Foz and the cadets have travelled to a small island near the Academy for some birdwatching. But when an electrical storm strikes the Academy, they end up stranded. Back in the library, Kyan and Glitch have to use their ingenuity to break out and help the others.
136	33	"Go Jet Academy: New Species"	25 May 2020
Lars sees a mysterious creature near the Academy jungle and rushes to tell the others. Ubercorn explains that new species are discovered all the time, so this could be something that no one has seen before. He also tells them that new species are often named after the person who finds them. Excited by the prospect of lending their name to this mysterious creature, Xuli, Kyan, Lars, Foz, Glitch and Tala head out on a jungle expedition - but something seems to be watching them from the treetops.
137	34	"Go Jet Academy: Geo Challenge"	26 May 2020
It's the yearly G.O. Challenge, a labyrinth full of trials designed to test the Go Jet cadets's geographical knowledge. The Go Jetters are amazed to discover that the reigning champion is Glitch - but only because he sacrificed his teammates in order to win! Entering the maze, Xuli, Kyan, Lars and Foz must face challenges related to the continents, the weather and recycling, all while trying to beat Glitch's record.
138	35	"Go Jet Academy: Stop Those Superweeds"	27 May 2020
When Glitch crash lands at the Go Jet Academy, he's furious to see that his accident was caused by a flowery plant blocking Grim HQ's chimneys. But Tala loves this plant and plans to grow some of the rare flowers in her research garden. Glitch decides to do the same, setting the Grimbots to create the perfect conditions for the plants to grow. But Foz and Tala soon find out that the plant is actually a superweed which grows so fast that it threatens to overwhelm the island. The Go Jetters stop the weed from damaging the Academy and Grim HQ.
139	36	"The Blarney Stone, Ireland"	28 May 2020
Glitch finally pushes the Grimbots too far with his rudeness, prompting them to go on strike. Glitch seeks help from Kyan - but Kyan has his own problems, as he's worried about speaking in front of a crowd for his upcoming show and tell. Glitch thinks of a solution to both their problems: they'll travel to Barney Castle in Ireland, near where his Great Aunt Cliodhna lived, and find the Barney Stone. It is said to give the gift of the gab to all who kiss it, making them brilliant at talking to people. But when they find a huge queue of tourists all waiting to kiss the stone, Glitch takes matters into his own hands to speed things up.
140	37	"Go Jet Academy: Around the World in 80 Days"	29 May 2020
It's a rainy day and the team are stuck inside, so Foz reads them his favourite book: Around the World in 80 Days by Jules Verne. The Go Jetters imagine they are characters from the story as they listen to a tale of travel by train, boat and even elephant. Will 'Phileas Foz' and his friends make the trip in time?
141	38	"Mars Mission: Chile"	7 September 2020
Xuli, Foz and Ubercorn help NASA test their Mars Rover in the Atacama Desert. As the oldest and driest desert in the world, scientists think it's somewhat like Mars itself! The rover is looking for tiny microbes hidden in the dry soil - if it can find them here, it may be able to find them on Mars too. Meanwhile, Glitch and Tala have dressed Grim HQ up as a flying saucer to take tourists to Mars. But after losing control, they end up crash-landing in the Atacama. When a science experiment of Tala's starts to go wrong, the Go Jetters must work to stop an unexpected flood in this driest of places.
142	39	"Go Jet Academy: Weather Prediction Predicament"	8 September 2020
Cadets all over the island tune in to watch Foz present the first Go Jet Academy weather report, which uses high-tech balloons and sea-buoys to predict the weather. But panic ensues when Glitch decides to broadcast his own, fake weather report - leaving the Grimbots and Cadets stranded. Can the Go Jetters un-glitch their weather equipment and save the cadets?
143	40	"Funky Fireflies, Selangor River, Malaysia"	9 September 2020
The Go Jetters are paddling down Malaysia's Selangor River in canoes to look at the region's fireflies. But after a bend in the river, they encounter Glitch attempting to chop down one of the protected mangrove trees, hoping to impress Tala with the rare plant. Although they manage to stop him, the approaching dark and some thick mud leave them in a tricky situation. Can the team work out how to light their way and find their friends?
144	41	"Pirate Peril, Jamaica"	10 September 2020
While Xuli and Lars help some local divers explore the underwater ruins of Port Royal, Jamaica, Glitch sets off in search of treasure buried by his great-great-great-uncle, Captain Grimbeard. But his efforts cause silt to churn up from the seabed, trapping Lars under the water. Will Xuli manage to get him free before his air runs out?
145	42	"Go Jet Academy: Waterspout Wipeout"	11 September 2020
Xuli, Lars and Glitch argue over whose vehicle is the best – the Vroomster, the Truckster or the Grimbler. Kyan suggests the only way to settle the argument is a race. A sudden waterspout helps Glitch take an early lead, but Ubercorn warns them about the much larger tornadic waterspouts that can sometimes appear. When the weather turns, The Go Jetters and Glitch find themselves in trouble. Can they get to safety before a huge tornado hits the island?
146	43	"Floating Farms, Bangladesh"	14 September 2020
While clearing up the Academy farm after a heavy storm, the Go Jetters wish they could keep the plants above water. Glitch remembers a place where the farmers do just that - Bangladesh, where many farmers grow their crops on wooden platforms to avoid floods in the monsoon season. Lars, Foz, Glitch and Tala head to Bangladesh to see these floating farms, but after the Grimbots accidentally knock the Grimmer into a raft, Tala and a local farmer are swept into a nearby river! The Go Jetters and Glitch have to turn their field trip into a rescue mission to get them safely back on dry land.
147	44	"Cave Train Trouble, Slovenia"	15 September 2020
Glitch has taken Tala on holiday to Slovenia's Postojna Caves, and she is looking forward to finding a rare creature called an olm for her class project. Lars and Ubercorn join them, with Lars interested in the caves's underground train system and rare animals. But when Glitch takes Tala and a group of unsuspecting tourists deep into the cave on the Grimbots's enlarged toy train, Lars has to race through the caves to protect them from falling stalactites.
148	45	"Endangered Species, São Paulo, Brazil"	16 September 2020
The Go Jetters are upset after hearing how many struggling and endangered species there are that need help to survive. Ubercorn tries to cheer them up by suggesting they head to the pristine forests of São Paulo, where they can see how conservationists are helping the black lion tamarin. But Glitch overhears them, and misunderstanding the meaning of the word 'pristine', decides to help the tamarins by cleaning up the forest! This could damage the habitat of these little monkeys, so the Go Jetters leap into action to stop him.
149	46	"Go Jet Academy: Dream Team Trouble"	17 September 2020
After a big argument Ubercorn and Glitch get stuck in the most remote place on Earth. Can the bickering pair make up and save themselves before they sink to the bottom of the sea.
150	47	"Mission Manatee, United States"	23 November 2020
Kyan and Lars swim through the shallows of Crystal River in Florida. Kyan tests his new swimming fin, while Lars watches a manatee and her baby cruise by. Xuli is water-skiing further downstream in the open waters of Crystal Bay, while Foz and Ubercorn watch on from Jet Pad. Grandmaster Glitch is taking the tourist family on a mermaid spotting tour of Crystal River aboard his Grimmer-boat. As Glitch heads off in search of real mermaids, he accidentally startles the mother manatee. Ubercorn realises the manatee will be in danger from the speeding boats and from the cold deep water. The Go Jetters need to mount a manatee rescue quickly. While Xuli attempts to stop the speedboats, Foz launches the Vroomster. The baby manatee has become attached to Kyan, so Lars suggests he remains with her, while Lars and Foz go to save the mother. Kyan is not happy at having to play baby-sitter.
151	48	"Go Jet Academy: Symbiosis Shrink Down"	24 November 2020
Lars, Foz and Tala shrink down to insect-size to learn about the friendship of plants and animals, but find themselves in big trouble when Glitch upsets a colony of ants.
152	49	"Puffin Patrol, Iceland"	25 November 2020
The team gets a surprise when they join Iceland's Puffin Patrol: For once, they are not the experts. Can Lars take advice from a Grandmaster, or will he be the one to glitch things?
153	50	"Meteorite Mayhem, Wolfe Creek Crater, Australia"	26 November 2020
Foz searches for a meteorite, so Glitch tries to go better and pulls a huge space rock towards Earth endangering the whole planet. Can the team stop it before it's too late?
154	51	"Go Jet Academy: Birthday Surprise"	27 November 2020
The Go Jetters face their toughest mission yet: organising a birthday party for Ubercorn without him finding out! Luckily, when Ubercorn and Glitch were cadets together, they made a map of all the secret passages around the Academy. The Go Jetters can use it to avoid detection while they prepare the party. Xuli and Lars take a secret tunnel to the arts and craft room to make the decorations, while Kyan, Foz and Glitch head out into the Academy garden to gather Ubercorn's favourite flowers, cherry blossoms. But things don't go according to plan, and the Go Jetters have to hide themselves to avoid a wandering Ubercorn.

=== Summer ===
No. overall	No. in season	Title	First aired
TBA	TBA	"The Great Barrier Reef, Australia"	TBA
TBA	TBA	"Easter Island, Chile"	TBA

== Broadcast ==
The series premiered via beIN, on the CBeebies international channel, across the Middle East and North Africa territories. By 2017, the series was also shown in Australia (ABC Kids), Ireland (Raidió Teilifís Éireann), France (France Télévisions and Boomerang - Since 8 February 2020) and Canada (Treehouse TV - discontinued 2017, and Family Jr. - resumed in 2021). The series began airing in the United States on (Universal Kids) on 5 November 2018.

== Spin off ==
On 12 February 2026, BBC Studios Kids & Family announced that they had commissioned a Singapore-based spin-off of the series, entitled Go Jetters Go!, under the support of the Infocomm Media Development Authority of Singapore. The series focuses on a new character named Kym, voiced by Singaporean actress Lim Shi-An, as she undertakes missions to find the Go Jetters Cup and become an official Go Jetter, while also thwarting the dastardly deeds of Grandmaster Glitch and the Grimbots. She is assisted on the way by the original four Go Jetters. The series is planned to air at the end of 2026 in the UK and Singapore, while being pre-sold internationally by BBC Studios in 2027.

== Video Services ==
Seasons of Go Jetters are available on variety of streaming or direct purchase video services.

=== Streaming ===
Streaming Service	Country Availability	Content
ABC iView	Australia	Season 1, Episode 1-6; Season 2, Episode 29-52
Foxtel Now	Australia	Seasons 1
Stan	Australia	Seasons 1 & 2

=== Direct Purchase ===
Direct Purchase Service	Country Availability	Content
Apple TV+	Worldwide	Seasons 1 & 2
Google Play	Worldwide	Season 1 & 2
Worldwide	Season 1, 2 and 3 (1-25)	

Both Google Play and Microsoft Store organise the available episodes into package titles, similar to the DVD title episode groupings

Season	Package Title	Episodes
Season 1	"The Eiffel Tower and Other Adventures"	1-10
Season 1	"The Leaning Tower of Pisa and Other Adventures"	11-18
Season 1	"Amazon Rainforest and Other Adventures"	19-26
Season 1	"The North Pole and Other Adventures"	27-34 & 40
Season 1	"Hong Kong and Other Adventures"	35-39 & 41-43
Season 1	"The Nazca Lines and Other Adventures"	44-51
Season 2	"Machu Picchu and Other Adventures"	1-7 & 17
Season 2	"Central Park, New York and Other Adventures"	8-16
Season 2	"Hurricane Rescue and Other Adventures"	18-26
Season 2	"The Great Pacific Garbage Patch and Other Adventures"	27-34 & 37
Season 2	"Wimbledon, England and Other Adventures"	35-36 & 38-44
Season 2	"Chocolate Hills, Philippines and Other Adventures"	45-52
Season 3	"Honey Bee Hijack and Other Adventures"	1-25

== Home media ==
=== DVD Releases ===
The British Broadcasting Corporation (BBC) produced a number of DVDs based on the show, with 2 Entertain for Region 2 and with Roadshow Entertainment for Region 4.

DVD name	Episodes	Release dates
“The Eiffel Tower and Other Adventures”	Season 1, episodes 1-10	Region 2: 25 July 2016; Region 4: 7 September 2016
“The Leaning Tower of Pisa and Other Adventures"	Season 1, episodes 11-18	Region 2: 3/24 October 2016; Region 4: 8 February 2017
“Amazon Rainforest and Other Adventures”	Season 1, episodes 19-26	Region 2: 13 February 2017; Region 4: 7 June 2017
“The North Pole and Other Adventures”	Season 1, episodes 27-34 & 40 (Special)	Region 2: 23 October 2017; Region 4: 15 November 2017
"Hong Kong and Other Adventures"	Season 1, episodes 35-39 & 41-43	Region 2: 12 February 2018
"The Nazca Lines and Other Adventures"	Season 1, episodes 44-51	Region 2: 11 June 2018
"Machu Picchu and Other Adventures”	Season 2, episodes 1-7 & 17	Region 2: 11 February 2019
