= The Rainmaker (TV series) =

American legal drama television series

- Promotional poster
- Genre: Legal drama
- Based on: The Rainmaker by John Grisham
- Developed by: Michael Seitzman & Jason Richman
- Starring: Milo Callaghan; Lana Parrilla; Madison Iseman; P. J. Byrne; Dan Fogler; Wade Briggs; Robyn Cara; John Slattery; Karen Bryson; Merle Dandridge
- Music by: Clinton Shorter
- Country of origin: United States
- Original language: English
- No. of seasons: 2
- No. of episodes: 16

Production
- Executive producers: Julia Cohen; Wendy Mericle; David Gernert; Russell Lee Fine; Jason Richman; Patrick Moran; John Grisham; Michael Seitzman; Kristen Bell; Jason Blum
- Producers: Adrian Kelly; Dara McClatchie
- Production locations: Dublin, Ireland
- Cinematography: Russell Lee Fine; Tim Fleming
- Editors: Bryan Lamoureux; Derek Holland; Darragh Moran; Shonnard Hedges; Paul Harb
- Production companies: Maniac; PKM Productions; Blumhouse Television; Lionsgate Television

Original release
- Network: USA Network
- Release: August 15, 2025 – present

The Rainmaker is an American legal drama television series based on John Grisham's 1995 novel, starring Milo Callaghan, Lana Parrilla and John Slattery. It premiered on USA Network on August 15, 2025. In October 2025, the series was renewed for a second season which premiered on October 16, 2026.

== Premise ==
A hotshot young lawyer is fired from his prestigious white-shoe firm and signs on with a small-time ambulance chaser and her less-than-honest paralegal who work out of a converted former restaurant. He soon finds himself facing off against his former employer in court when he takes on a wrongful death suit involving a man who died while undergoing hospital care.

== Cast ==
=== Main ===
- Milo Callaghan as Rudy Baylor, a recently hired associate at J. Lyman Stone and Associates who got fired on his first day at Tinley Britt
- Lana Parrilla as Jocelyn "Bruiser" Stone, a senior partner at the personal injury firm J. Lyman Stone and Associates
- Madison Iseman as Sarah Plankmore, a first-year associate at Tinley Britt and Rudy's girlfriend and later, ex-girlfriend
- P. J. Byrne as Deck Shifflet, a former insurance agent and paralegal at J. Lyman Stone and Associates who holds a Juris Doctor degree but failed the bar exam seven times
- Dan Fogler as Melvin Pritcher, a nurse with dark intentions
- Wade Briggs as Brad Noonan, a senior associate at Tinley Britt
- Robyn Cara as Kelly Riker, Rudy's neighbor dealing with an abusive husband
- John Slattery as Leo F. Drummond, a managing partner at Tinley Britt
- Karen Bryson as Dot Black (season 2; recurring season 1), a grieving mother who is suing Great Benefit Hospital Systems for her son's wrongful death
- Merle Dandridge as Amanda Vonn (season 2), a senior partner at Becker Sinclair & Vonn

=== Recurring ===
- Tommie Earl Jenkins as Prince Thomas, the owner of Yogi's Bar where Rudy works as a bartender
- Ali White as Mary Baylor, Rudy's mother
- Hugh Quarshie as Wilfred R. Keeley, the CEO of Great Benefit Hospital Systems who hires Tinley Britt to represent him
- Jonathan Forbes as Rod Nunley, a lawyer who offers to represent Melvin
- Gemma-Leah Devereux as Jackie Lemancyzk, a nurse who used to work alongside Melvin
- Jonathan Harden as Agent Nick Cistulli
- Asher De Land as Victor Suffredes (season 2), Rudy's client who is a kid
- Austin Nichols as Tom Cassady (season 2), Bruiser's ex-husband who is a minor league coach
- Libby Kay as Megan Grenier (season 2), Amanda's paralegal
- Liam O'Halloran as Boone McCready (season 2)
- Owen Roe as Gator Jack Guidry (season 2), a mob boss

== Production ==
=== Development ===
In 2018, it was reported that a television series adaptation of The Rainmaker was being developed by Michael Seitzman and Jason Richman for Hulu with ABC Studios. The series was slated to be one of the first in a larger shared universe based on the works of John Grisham, alongside an adaptation of his 2015 novel Rogue Lawyer; both series would have been produced concurrently and contain an intertwining storyline with shared characters, and would have been able to be watched on a parallel or standalone basis. Neither series went forward with Hulu.

After signing a first-look deal with Blumhouse Television in 2021, Seitzman began developing The Rainmaker as a standalone project with the studio. Blumhouse would offer it to Lionsgate Television, and USA Network would order it to series in June 2024. It was reported that the series was considered part of a pivot by the channel back towards producing original dramas in the vein of its previous "blue sky" era. On October 23, 2025, USA Network renewed the series for a second season.

=== Casting ===
On August 12, 2024, it was announced that John Slattery would star as Leo F. Drummond. Two days later, it was announced that Madison Iseman would star as Sarah Plankmore. On August 20, 2024, it was announced that Milo Callaghan would star as the leading role of Rudy Baylor. The next day, it was reported that Lana Parrilla would star as Jocelyn "Bruiser" Stone, and the following day, it was reported that P. J. Byrne would star as Deck Shifflet. On September 4, 2024, it was reported that Robyn Cara would star as Kelly Riker. On September 12, 2024, it was announced that Dan Fogler would star as Melvin Pritcher. On September 27, 2024, it was announced that Wade Briggs would star as Brad Noonan. On October 23, 2024, it was reported that Tommie Earl Jenkins would play Prince Thomas in a recurring role. On January 8, 2026, it was reported that Austin Nichols was cast in a recurring capacity for the second season. On March 9, 2026, it was announced Merle Dandridge joined the cast as a series regular for the second season. On May 21, 2026, it was reported that Libby Kay and Liam O'Halloran were cast in recurring capacities for the second season.

=== Filming ===
Filming for the first season took place in Dublin, Ireland, from October 2024 to February 2025. Lionsgate considered filming in Charleston, South Carolina, where the story is set, but moved the production to Ireland to take advantage of lower filming costs and tax incentives. B-roll footage of certain Charleston locations was filmed in January 2025.

== Episodes ==
=== Series overview ===
Season	Episodes	Originally released	
Season	Episodes	First released	Last released
1	10	August 15, 2025	October 17, 2025
2	TBA	October 16, 2026	TBA

=== Season 1 (2025) ===
No. overall	No. in season	Title	Directed by	Written by	Original release date	U.S. viewers (millions)
1	1	"Another Rainy Day"	Russell Lee Fine	Michael Seitzman & Jason Richman	August 15, 2025	0.527
In Charleston, South Carolina, Rudy Baylor and his girlfriend Sarah Plankmore are new first-year associates at prestigious law firm Tinley Britt. Volunteering at a legal clinic, they meet Dot Black, who blames North City General Hospital for the death of her son, Donny Ray. On his first day at Tinley Britt, Rudy argues with managing partner Leo Drummond and is fired. His former boss Prince Thomas arranges for him to join personal injury firm J. Lyman Stone and Associates, run by Jocelyn "Bruiser" Stone. Rudy struggles with paralegal Deck Shifflet's ambulance-chasing tactics, while Sarah impresses Wilfred Keeley, CEO of North City General and Tinley Britt's biggest client. Rudy and Deck encounter Melvin Pritcher, a former nurse falsely accused of setting a house fire that killed his own mother. Rudy convinces Jocelyn to pursue Dot's wrongful death claim against the hospital, unaware they are under surveillance by Jane Allen and Ethan Rook. Searching for fellow nurse Jackie Lemancyzk, Melvin murders a neighbor who interferes.
2	2	Episode 2	Russell Lee Fine	Michael Seitzman	August 22, 2025	0.598
Melvin vows to find those responsible for his mother's death. Seeking Jackie and Melvin as witnesses who treated Donny Ray at the hospital, Deck and Rudy break into Melvin's motel room, where he ambushes them by driving a truck through the wall. Tailed by Jane and Ethan, Melvin abducts and interrogates Ethan before killing him. Donny Ray's autopsy confirms he died from drug-related illness, but urine left in his toilet reveals he was drug-free before being taken to the hospital. At the case's first hearing, Rudy defends Donny Ray's sobriety and convinces the judge to deny Leo's request for summary judgement, while Leo and Keeley are displeased to learn of Sarah's relationship with Rudy. Noticing his neighbor Kelly Riker is being abused by her husband Cliff, Rudy confides in Dot about his own brother's death, and supports her in refusing a $250,000 settlement. The case proceeds to trial, and Sarah is introduced to Jane, Tinley Britt's lead investigator.
3	3	Episode 3	Russell Lee Fine	Barbara Curry and Michael Seitzman	August 29, 2025	0.590
Approaching Donny Ray's doctor at an Alcoholics Anonymous meeting before deposing him, Rudy realizes that Donny Ray shared his hospital room with another patient. Deck traces a florist's order to find the patient, who witnessed Melvin give Donny Ray a mysterious injection. Rudy and Deck continue to search for Jackie, who is in hiding with the help of her ex-boyfriend Charlie. Sarah and Rudy take the bar exam, and Rudy is threatened by Cliff after giving Kelly a ride home. The FBI questions Jocelyn about her father, her firm's namesake who has ties to Leo and Prince and is in prison for helping a witness, Rosalie Sutton, escape the country; Rosalie is now believed to have been killed. Offering to settle Dot's claim in exchange for an $80 million payout from Leo, Jocelyn remembers Prince coming to her with Rosalie and her baby for help. Rudy's mother Mary discovers he was fired from Tinley Britt, while Jackie is captured by Melvin.
4	4	Episode 4	Randy Zisk	Michael Seitzman	September 5, 2025	0.564
The case comes between Rudy and Sarah, who inadvertently reveals that Jackie served on the hospital's "tissue committee" monitoring patient cases for quality control. Keeley refuses to settle with Jocelyn, and Melvin holds Jackie captive at his childhood summer camp. Running into Rudy at the courthouse, Melvin reveals he was told Rudy was responsible for his mother's death, but believes Rudy when he denies it. Deck links Melvin to the murder of Jackie's neighbor, while Jane plants a tracker on Melvin's car, unaware Jackie is imprisoned in his trunk. Melvin forces Jackie to admit that she informed the committee about Melvin's role in Donny Ray's death, leading to her dismissal and the fire that killed Melvin's mother. Jackie reveals she kept an incriminating file, and Melvin surprises and stabs Jane, who escapes. Rudy offers to help Kelly escape her abusive marriage, but Cliff has found the money she has been saving and attacks her.
5	5	Episode 5	Randy Zisk	Julia Cohen	September 12, 2025	0.509
Deck bribes a doctor for information about Melvin and his mother Evalene, and stops Rudy from confronting Cliff, whose abuse has put Kelly in the hospital. Evalene's criminal record leads Rudy and Deck to a former corrections officer who remembers that Melvin was born to his heroin-addicted mother in prison. Rudy visits Kelly, bonding over his brother's lucky token from Myrtle Beach. Locked in Melvin's trunk while he meets his parole officer at a diner, Jackie convinces Melvin to let her use the bathroom and steals a cell phone. Unable to reach 911, she calls to warn Charlie's wife Amber before bringing Melvin to their house, where she tries to escape. Subduing Amber with a shovel, Melvin recaptures Jackie. Sarah humiliates Rudy in court, earning Leo's approval and bringing her closer to his senior associate Brad Noonan. Determined to bring Melvin to justice, Rudy goes to the police behind Jocelyn's back, and she fires him.
6	6	Episode 6	Randy Zisk	Wendy Mericle	September 19, 2025	0.569
Sarah enjoys a lavish company trip to London, where she sleeps with Brad. Rudy is working in Prince's bar again, and Mary worries he tries too hard to live up to his late brother. With advice from Prince, Rudy helps Kelly escape Cliff and brings her to stay with Dot. Jocelyn is prepared to settle but Leo's offer is shrinking, while Sarah suspects Tinley Britt is hiding the tissue committee's files. Having earned the highest bar exam score in a decade, Rudy and his mother visit his brother's grave. He convinces Jocelyn to let him depose Bernie Manfred, the hospital executive who fired Jackie. Using information from a law school friend about Manfred's suspicious stock trades, Rudy baits Manfred into defending the committee's findings, forcing Tinley Britt to produce the incriminating files. Rudy rejoins J. Lyman Stone, and the files reveal that Donny Ray's death was one in a pattern of fifteen suspicious cases discovered by Jackie.
7	7	Episode 7	Russell Lee Fine	Michael Seitzman	September 26, 2025	0.601
Prince gives Rudy a gun to protect Kelly, and listening devices are discovered in the J. Lyman Stone office. Sarah is surprised by a visit from her father, Leo's friend and fellow lawyer. Breaking in to Dot's home and attacking Kelly, Cliff is shot dead and Rudy is arrested for his murder. Jocelyn prepares to defend Rudy against prosecutor Robert Quinn, who sent her father to prison. Brad fires a recovering Jane, and Sarah gains access to the tissue committee files, agreeing to get her hands dirty. She poses as a police detective to question Charlie, who is hiding the flash drive with Jackie's file. Reenacting Cliff and Rudy's altercation, Jocelyn realizes that Kelly shot Cliff, but Rudy offered to take the blame. Presented with the truth, Quinn declines to pursue charges against either of them, and reveals to Jocelyn that her father was caught on tape in an incriminating conversation with Prince. Kelly leaves to start a new life, while Leo hires Prince to hunt down Melvin and Jackie.
8	8	Episode 8	Russell Lee Fine	Johnny Richardson	October 3, 2025	0.523
The FBI warn Rudy that Rosalie's body has been found, but deny planting the listening devices. Released from prison, J. Lyman suggests the office was bugged by Leo and arranges a $1 million settlement for the case, which Jocelyn refuses. On trial for his mother's murder, Melvin appears in court, and Rudy and Deck follow him to the storage facility where he is keeping Jackie, unaware Jane has freed her. Rudy tries to intervene as Prince leads Melvin away at gunpoint, and warns Jocelyn that Leo is eliminating their key witnesses. Disturbed when Brad selfishly chokes her during sex, Sarah realizes he has never respected her. Speaking honestly, Keeley urges Sarah to free herself of Leo and his own guilt, but she remains committed to representing him. Rudy finds Jackie, but she is too scared to stay. When Lyman pressures Jocelyn to drop the case, Rudy resigns and reveals Dot has signed him as her lawyer instead, joined by Deck. Years since Rosalie's daughter was left behind by her mother, Jocelyn checks on her from afar.
9	9	Episode 9	Michael Seitzman	Michael Seitzman & Julia Cohen	October 10, 2025	0.581
The trial for Dot's case against the hospital begins. In his opening statement, Rudy abruptly changes course, accusing Keeley of covering up Melvin's fifteen murdered patients. Granted one more day to produce evidence, Rudy convinces Jackie to testify. The judge allows Rudy to proceed with both claims but excludes the hospital data stolen by Jackie as evidence. Raiding Jocelyn's office, the FBI offers her immunity to turn against her father, playing her Lyman's conversation with Prince appearing to arrange Rosalie's murder. Tinley Britt has settled with the other victims' families to prevent their testimony, and Sarah secures Amber's silence. On the stand, Jackie reveals Keeley lied about the hospital's narcotics-dispenser records, and is permitted to introduce the stolen file, which implicates Melvin in the fifteen suspicious overdoses. Sarah attempts to discredit Jackie, and Leo demotes Brad, who threatens to expose Leo's illegal dealings, but Jane has been enlisted to incriminate Brad instead. Lyman admits to Jocelyn that Rosalie was accidentally killed while fleeing the country, and Rudy discovers Prince has kept Melvin captive but alive.
10	10	Episode 10	Michael Seitzman	Michael Seitzman	October 17, 2025	0.624
Turning Melvin over to the police, Rudy convinces him to testify. Believing Tinley Britt is responsible for his mother's death, Melvin confesses to fatally injecting Donny Ray and the fourteen other patients, before Leo provokes Melvin into attacking him. Forced to put Keeley on the stand, Leo realizes Brad is cooperating with the FBI. Rudy tries to expose Keeley for concealing Melvin's crimes, but Sarah guides Keeley to implicate Brad instead. Taking the stand himself, Leo appears to outwit Rudy but, by appearing as a witness, is disqualified from serving as Keeley's counsel. Rudy delivers a heartfelt closing argument, urging the jury to bring Dot justice for her son. Left to deliver the closing argument herself, Sarah weaponizes Rudy's grief for his brother to discredit him and Dot's claim. The jury rules against the hospital, awarding Dot over $80 million in damages. With Prince and Lyman in hiding, Dot and her legal team celebrate at Prince's bar, now owned by Rudy, who gives Deck his lucky token for the bar exam. Sarah's ruthlessness has secured her position at Tinley Britt, while Brad is arrested for Leo's crimes and sent to prison, alongside a vengeful Melvin.

=== Season 2 (2026) ===
No. overall	No. in season	Title	Directed by	Written by	Original release date	U.S. viewers (millions)
11	1	"Dear Uncle Rudy"	Michael Seitzman	Michael Seitzman	October 16, 2026	N/A
12	2	"Cards Up"	Michael Seitzman	Jason Richman	October 23, 2026	N/A
13	3	"Chokepoint"	Michael Offer	Johnny Richardson	October 30, 2026	TBD
14	4	"Numerosity"	Michael Offer	Julia Cohen	November 6, 2026	TBD
15	5	"The Coral Sea"	Hannah Quinn	Ellen Rapoport	November 13, 2026	TBD
16	6	"Morvatrivlet"	Hannah Quinn	Caroline Quien	November 20, 2026	TBD
17	7	"The High Court"	TBA	Michael Seitzman & Johnny Richardson	November 27, 2026	TBD
18	8	"What You Know"	TBA	Julia Cohen	December 4, 2026	TBD
19	9	"What You Have"	TBA	Jason Richman	December 11, 2026	TBD
20	10	"Who You Are"	TBA	Michael Seitzman	December 18, 2026	TBD

== Release ==
The series premiered on USA Network on August 15, 2025. In Canada, Bell Media confirmed that the series would air on its local version of USA Network. The second season premiered on October 16, 2026.

== Reception ==
On Rotten Tomatoes, the first season holds an approval rating of 50% based on 29 critic reviews, with an average rating of 5.4/10. The website's critics consensus reads, "Stripping John Grisham's novel of its flavor in favor of a more clichéd courtroom format, this Rainmaker adaptation only produces intermittent showers." Metacritic gave the series a weighted average score of 52 out of 100 based on 18 critics, indicating "mixed or average" reviews.
