= Video Nasty (TV series) =

Irish television series

- Genre: Comedy horror
- Screenplay by: Hugh Travers
- Directed by: Christopher Smith; Megan K Fox
- Starring: Justin Daniels Anene; Cal O'Driscoll; Leia Murphy
- Country of origin: Ireland
- Original language: English
- No. of series: 1
- No. of episodes: 6

Production
- Executive producers: Hugh Travers; Ailish McElmeel; David Fortier; Ivan Schneeberg; Nick Nantell; Erik Pack; Eddie Doyle; Raphaëlle Oloan; Frank Tönsmann; Nada Cirjanic; Paul Donovan; Marc Lorber
- Producers: Ailish McElmeel; Julie Baines
- Production companies: Deadpan Pictures; Boat Rocker Studios

Original release
- Network: BBC Three; Virgin Media One
- Release: 8 January – 22 January 2025

Video Nasty is a 2025 Irish comedy horror television series set in the 1980s. It premiered on 8 January 2025 on BBC Three.

== Plot ==
Dublin 1985: Two teenagers, the determined Billy and his insecure friend Con, are horror fans and collect a series of legally banned horror films, colloquially known as ‘Video Nasty’, with the aim of selling their complete collection for a high price. They are only missing a single cassette, which has turned up with a collector in central England who calls herself ‘Fangoria Fangirl’ and is in correspondence with Billy. The boys are under pressure because they have financed their previous collection from the fund for an upcoming school ball, which Con is managing. With nothing left over, Con's slightly older sister Zoe finances the trip to central England on the condition that she comes along and shares in the profits.

While the three of them are travelling, a girl is attacked by a masked stranger in central England and later found dead. The police find a letter from Billy to ‘Fangoria’ on her body, which makes the three of them suspects, especially as a dodgy driver called Joe has given the three of them a lift and later denounces them to the police. Con and Zoe are reported missing by their parents, while Billy's father Abe keeps a cool head and trusts his son to get through this alone. But eventually the three of them go after their children.

The teenagers meet Topher, a shy boy who claims to be ‘Fangoria’ and shows Billy's letters as proof. Whilst showing the boys the video for exchange in an annex, he sets them up; at the same time, Zoe, who has stayed behind in the house, is attacked and almost raped by Joe until a devout woman appears and stops him. As it turns out, she is planning to stage a murder between the three teenagers and also frame them for the murder of the girl in order to demonstrate the corrupting influence of such videos on adolescents.

While the parents are stranded with a lack of petrol and are asking for petrol at the very house in which the children are trapped, the youngsters manage to free themselves and escape from the former cowshed through the slurry pit after overpowering Joe, who has followed them. At night, they break into the unoccupied police station in the village and dial the emergency number. They get into an argument about what to do next, and Zoe realises that Con is in love with Billy. When Joe appears, who is a policeman himself, they narrowly escape. They lose each other on the run. Con is caught by Joe while praying in the church; Billy is caught by the older woman while trying to get the tape; Zoe is chased by Joe through a forest and runs right in front of her parents' car. She shows the police evidence of the radical family's murders. Afterwards, at least one policewoman is convinced of the youngsters' innocence. The boys manage to escape the family again, but end up being chased by an agitated mob while they believe they have to save Zoe from being burned to death.

In a final chase through a ritual burning scene, the teenagers' pursuers are overpowered by their parents, while the older woman burns herself to death after Topher, who tried to stop the killing, has been stabbed.

In an epilogue, Billy and Zoe become a couple. Con and Billy have decided to keep the now complete video collection (the missing cassette was saved from being burnt). Their parents take over the deficit in the school ball fund.

== Cast and characters ==
- Justin Daniels Anene as Billy
- Cal O'Driscoll as Con
- Leia Murphy as Zoe
- Declan Rodgers as Frank
- Simone Kirby as Ethel
- Emmanuel Ighodaro as Abe
- Valerie O'Connor as Maureen
- Barry John Kinsella as Reverend Downing
- Milo Callaghan as Joe
- Oliver Finnegan as Topher
- David O'Reilly as Robert

== Production ==
The six-part series is written by Hugh Travers and directed by Christopher Smith and Megan K Fox. It is produced for Deadpan Pictures and Boat Rocker by Ailish McElmeel and Julie Baines. The executive producers are Travers, McElmeel, David Fortier, Ivan Schneeberg, Nick Nantell, Erik Pack, Eddie Doyle, Raphaëlle Oloan, Frank Tönsmann, Nada Cirjanic, Paul Donovan and Marc Lorber. It is made with support from Coimisiún na Meán, Screen Ireland and Northern Ireland Screen.

The cast includes Justin Daniels Anene, Cal O’Driscoll, Leia Murphy, Oliver Finnegan, Valerie O’Connor, Declan Rodgers, Simone Kirby and Emmanuel Ighodaro.

Filming took place in Northern Ireland and the Republic of Ireland in April 2024. Filming locations included County Tyrone, County Monaghan, and County Cavan.

== Broadcast ==
It premiered on BBC Northern Ireland, BBC Three, and BBC iPlayer in the United Kingdom on 8 January 2025. It premiered on Virgin Media Television in the Republic of Ireland on 20 January 2025.

== Reception ==
Keith Watson in The Daily Telegraph said there was "no faulting the period detail" and that it was a "bumpily chaotic but endearing joyride that plays like a period drama for anyone under 40". He noted that it "nods to every horror movie under the howling moon" and that even though it was "clearly filmed on a shoestring" the creators "obviously know their Hammer from their Halloween and, making a virtue of a tight budget, give the action a believably vintage home movie feel".

Maria Latilla for Film Stories said that "the central trio, Justin Daniels Anene, Cal O’Driscoll and Leia Murphy, are all charming and have plenty of chemistry and screen presence" and that "Video Nasty is crafted with so much love for everything it references."

Ed Power in The Irish Times praised the "whizzing chemistry" of the three main leads and described the series as having been "made by people who know how to put a working drama together. It won’t blow your mind – but it is great fun".

== Accolades ==
In January 2026, the series was nominated at the IFTA Film & Drama Awards for best director for Megan K Fox, best script for Hugh Travers, best supporting actor for Cal O'Driscoll, as well as nominations in production design and sound. In March 2026, the series was nominated at the Royal Television Society Republic of Ireland Awards in the scripted category.
