= Peter McGann =

Irish comedian, actor, and writer

- Born: Rathdrum, County Wicklow, Ireland
- Education: University of Galway (BA in Film, MA in Screenwriting)
- Occupations: Comedian, actor, writer, director
- Known for: Viral comedy sketches, Great Lad tour (2024), The Roaring Banshees

Peter McGann is an Irish comedian, actor, writer and director. He is a two-time Goss.ie-award nominee.

McGann was raised near Rathdrum, County Wicklow, and lives in Sandymount, Dublin with his wife and daughter. He studied film as an undergraduate, and holds a master's degree in screenwriting from the University of Galway.

McGann rose to prominence posting comedy sketches during the 2020 Covid-19 lockdown that frequently went viral. McGann has represented France at the Bureau De Change Song Contest. He had his first national stand-up tour, Great Lad, in 2024.

The Roaring Banshees, a play McGann co-wrote with John Morton about a mob of Irish women in prohibition-era Chicago, was announced to be adapted as a television series in 2025 after a successful theatrical run.
