= Leia Murphy =

Irish actress

- Education: Gaiety School of Acting
- Occupation: Actress
- Years active: 2019–present

Leia Murphy is an Irish television actress. She had a lead role in comedy-horror series Video Nasty (2025). Her television roles also include Small Town, Big Story (2025).

== Early life ==
Murphy is from Lucan, County Dublin, and attended the Gaiety School of Acting.

== Career ==
Murphy appeared in the 2020 short film The Yellow Dress for which she won the Outstanding Achievement Award (Child/Young Actress) at the Los Angeles short film festival. She played troubled teen Vinny Doherty in Irish soap opera Fair City.

In 2023, she was cast in Chris O'Dowd comedy series Small Town, Big Story. In 2025, she could be seen in a lead role in 1980s-set comedy-horror series Video Nasty.

== Filmography ==
Key
†	Denotes works that have not yet been released

Year	Title	Role	Notes
2019–2021	Fair City	Vinny Doherty	Series 30 & 32; 8 episodes
2020	The Yellow Dress	Aisling	Short film
2025	Video Nasty	Zoe	Episodes 1–6
2025	Small Town, Big Story	Joanne Proctor	Episodes 1–6
2025	Call the Midwife	Marie Byrne	2 episodes
TBA	Angels in the Asylum†	Emma	Filming
