= Fresh Film Festival (Ireland) =

Film festival

Coordinates: 52°39′54″N 8°37′26″W

Fresh International Film Festival
- Location: Limerick, Ireland
- Founded: 1997 (as the Irish Schools Video Competition)
- Festival date: March/April
- Language: English, others
- Website: freshfilm.ie

The Fresh International Film Festival (Irish: Féile Úr Scannán) is a festival for young people which takes place in Limerick, Ireland each Spring.

Founded in 1997, the event was originally known as the "Irish Schools Video Competition". The annual festival includes its competitive event, Ireland's Young Filmmaker of the Year, which screens films made by young people aged between 7 and 18 years.

== Events ==
The festival's main stated aim is to encourage young people to make films. The festival also hosts workshops and meetings for young filmmakers. Workshops, undertaken at past events, have included a videogame design workshop and a filmmaking workshop by Eugene O'Connor.

Screenings of feature films also occur at the festival. Past screenings have included the animated feature film Persepolis at the 2011 event. The films selected for screening at the 2004 event were all based on the theme of "war".

== Award winners ==
Awards at the event, including "Ireland's Young Filmmaker of the Year", are judged by a number of film and education professionals and the 1st and 2nd prize winners at the previous years competition. The award ceremony for the senior category is held in March/April. Past winners have included:

=== Best short film (senior award) ===
- 2025: "Abhaile" - by Emma Whelan
- 2024: "Ivy" - by Fiachra Cotter O'Culachain
- 2023: "The Tell-Tale Heart" - by Max Hendrickson
- 2022: "The Least I Can Do" - by Seán Tracey
- 2021: "Learning to Dance Like a Bird" - by Ella Nethercott, Dublin
- 2020: "Pirates"- Directed by Cal O'Driscoll
- 2019: "Rue"- Directed by Sean Treacy
- 2018: "Choice" - Directed by John Farrelly
- 2017: "Hidden Potential" - Directed by Eamonn McMahon
- 2016: "Poppies" - Directed by Rachel McGill, Limerick
- 2014: "The Perfect Place" - by Dara O'Cairbre
- 2012: "Together in Dreams" - by David Brazil, Conor Igoe, Shane O'Brien, Dublin
- 2011: "4:27 AM" -Directed by Seán Murphy
- 2010: "Dystopia" by Seán Conroy from Dublin
- 2009: "The Grim Trials of Vida Novac" by Nicholas Sheridan from Wexford
- 2008: "Alien Verbatim" by Laurence Snashall from Schull
- 2007: "Hang Up Noise Man" by Re Productions from Dublin
- 2006: "The Cycle" dir. Eoghan McQuinn from Dublin
- 2005: "The Vent" dir. Glenn Lambert DublinMade Films, Dublin
- 2004: " The Boy's Revenge" dir. Jonathan Lambert, DublinMade Films, Dublin
- 2003: "The Unmentionable" dir. Dónal Foreman & Danny McMahon, DogDay Films, Dublin
- 2002: "Weird Evolution" dir. Emlyn Lewis, Cavan
- 2001: "Oxygen" by Jeremy O'Hanlon, Dublin
- 2000: "After The War" by Vincent Lambe, Dublin
- 1999: "The Jock Club and the Mellon Collie Death of Eugene Nerdlinger" dir. Anthony Kinsella - C13 Pictures

=== Radharc Trust: Documentary Award ===
This category is sponsored by the Radharc Trust. Past winners have included:

- 2012: "Joy Ride" by Southhill Youth Space, Limerick
- 2011: "The First Rose" by 5th Class Scoil Eoin
- 2008: "Sneakers" by Patrickswell National School, Limerick

=== Brown Bag Animation Award ===
The animation award is supported by Brown Bag Films. Previous winners have included:

- 2011: "Ages Ago" by Ryan and Mark Buckley
- 2010: "Reflection" by Alfie Hollingsworth and Dylan Bickerton
- 2009: "The Show-Offs" by Colaiste Chiarain, Croom, Limerick
- 2008: "The Last Penguin" by Sacred Heart School, Portlaoise
- 2007: "UpsideDown Goldfish" directed by Bryan O'Sullivan, Cork
