= John Farrelly (director) =

Irish filmmaker

- Born: 2000 or 2001 (age 25–26)
- Occupations: Writer, director, producer

John Farrelly (born 2000 or 2001) is an Irish writer, director, and producer known for An Taibhse, The Sleep Experiment, and the short film Choice.

== Early life ==
Farrelly is originally from Drogheda in County Louth. He attended a Gaelscoil primary school and later studied at the Ulster University Magee campus in Derry. As of 2022, he was living in Warrenpoint in County Down.

== Career ==
At the 2018 Fresh Film Festival, then aged 17, Farrelly was awarded Ireland's "Young Filmmaker of the Year" for his short film Choice. He had previously entered several other works to the Fresh Film Festival (formerly known as the Irish Schools Video Competition) and came second in 2014.

As of 2019, Farrelly was set to release his debut feature film, The Sleep Experiment. He wrote, directed, produced and edited The Sleep Experiment during his final year of secondary school. It was released in October 2022.

His film An Taibhse ("The Ghost"), which premiered in Ireland at the 2024 Galway Film Fleadh, had its international premiere at FrightFest in London in August 2024. The film's US premiere occurred during the 2024 Newport Beach Film Festival in California.

A further feature film, Naxos, is planned for release at the Galway Film Fleadh in July 2026.

== Filmography ==
=== Feature films ===
Year	Title	Director	Writer	Producer	Editor	Notes
2022	The Sleep Experiment	Yes	Yes	Yes	Yes	Debut feature film
2024	An Taibhse (The Ghost)	Yes	Yes	Yes	Yes	Premiered at 2024 Galway Film Fleadh

=== Selected short films ===
Year	Title	Director	Writer	Producer	Editor	Notes
2022	Different	Yes	Yes	Yes	Yes	Irish with English subtitles
2018	Choice	Yes	Yes	Yes	Yes	Winner of Irelands "Young Filmmaker of the Year"
