= Penrhyn, Ipswich =

Penrhyn
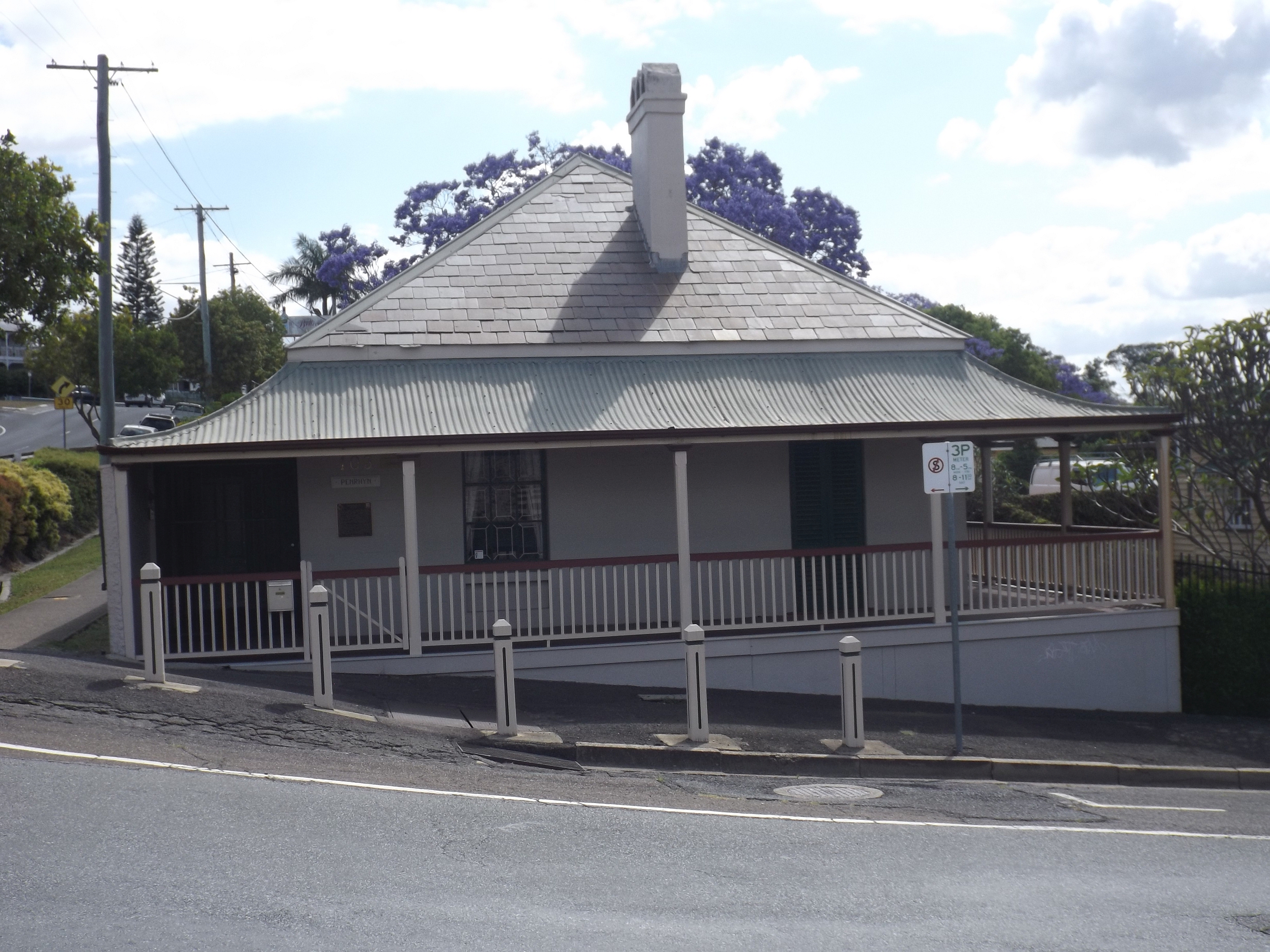
- Building in 2015

- Location within Queensland Location within Australia
- 27.6156°S 152.754°E
- Location: 103 Limestone Street, Ipswich, City of Ipswich, Queensland, Australia

History
- Design period: 1870s–1890s (late 19th century)
- Built: c. 1879
- Built for: John Farrelly

Site notes
- Architect: John Farrelly

Queensland Heritage Register
- Official name: Residence, 103 Limestone St (1879), Penrhyn
- Type: state heritage (built)
- Designated: 21 October 1992
- Reference no.: 600585
- Significant period: 1870s–1880s (fabric); 1870s–1900s (historical)
- Significant components: furniture/fittings, residential accommodation – main house, bathroom/bathhouse
- Builders: John Farrelly

Penrhyn is a heritage-listed detached house at 103 Limestone Street, Ipswich, City of Ipswich, Queensland, Australia. It was designed and built by John Farrelly c. 1879. It was added to the Queensland Heritage Register on 21 October 1992.

== History ==
Penrhyn is a rendered brick house on two levels, built in 1879 by builder/architect John Farrelly.

Born in Ireland in 1831, Farrelly came to Australia in 1861 and settled in Ipswich where he worked first as a builder and later as an architect. He was a prominent member of St Mary's congregation and a supporter of Irish institutions such as Saint Patrick's Day celebrations.

In 1875, John Farrelly bought four blocks of land in Limestone Street and progressively built four brick houses on them, now Nos 109, 107, 105 and 103. No 103, now named "Penrhyn", was built in 1879 and was initially rented. Farrelly occupied it himself with his wife Susan from about 1884.

The house design makes it appear earlier than its actual date of construction and it is probably built partly from demolition materials. Farrelly is recorded as having used recycled materials on several other occasions including the music block at St Mary's and Knockmoyra in Darling Street. The bricks in No 103 appear very old and the concave curve of the verandah roof is more typical of an earlier style.

The house is built into the hillside on Denmark Hill and from an early date, there were problems with the level of Limestone Street. In January 1881, Farrelly complained to Council about "the filling-up of the roadway near his property." This process has continued and the front verandah, now enclosed, is below footpath level.

Farrelly died in this house in 1904 and the Limestone Street property passed to his widow Susan until her death in 1908. The four houses plus a cottage in Waghorn St (since demolished) were auctioned in late 1908 to settle the estate and No 103 was bought by the Watson family several months later. Later owners include the O'Keefes, Parcells and Macadams. It has been used as a rental property for many years and during this time, the verandahs were progressively enclosed.

Conservation work was carried out in the early 1990s. At this time, it was converted into a professional office and a small extension was built on the western side to allow kitchen and bathroom facilities to be relocated from the northern verandah.

== Description ==
The residence Penrhyn is a small two-storey load-bearing brick house with the external brickwork now covered in ruled render. Because of the steep slope of the land, the house appears single storey along its street frontages but there is access to a lower floor from the northern side. The house has a hipped and slated main roof and a concave curved corrugated galvanised iron verandah roof on four sides.

There are open verandahs on the north and east and an enclosed rear verandah extended to the west. The verandah to the south is enclosed with a rendered wall pierced with a row of louvred windows. Timber lattice covers these windows on the exterior. The southern and eastern verandahs abut the footpath.

The verandah balustrade on the upper level is of a simple square baluster design and the timber verandah posts terminate with a decorative capital immediately beneath the head beam. The lower level verandah is paved in sandstone blocks.

The four main rooms at the upper level have pressed metal ceilings, three of which are vaulted to obtain additional height. The walls are plastered and floors are timber. Most of the original multi-paned colonial sash windows have survived. Below the windows on the exterior is a rectangular recess, a typical Farrelly detail.

There are two cast-iron grate fireplaces on the upper level and an open fireplace at lower ground level.

The lower level has two rooms, each with a pair of tall, narrow multipaned casement windows. The larger room has a pair of panelled doors opening to the north. Behind these rooms is an undercroft area containing a large cement bath.

The small western extension has a pitched and gabled roof and is clad in grooved plywood. It contains a bathroom and an office room. It has colonial sash multi-paned windows and a small rear staircase and entry.

The cottage sits on a combination of brick and stone foundation walls. One of the main internal brick walls of the cottage is supported clear of the ground on a timber log bearer.

== Heritage listing ==
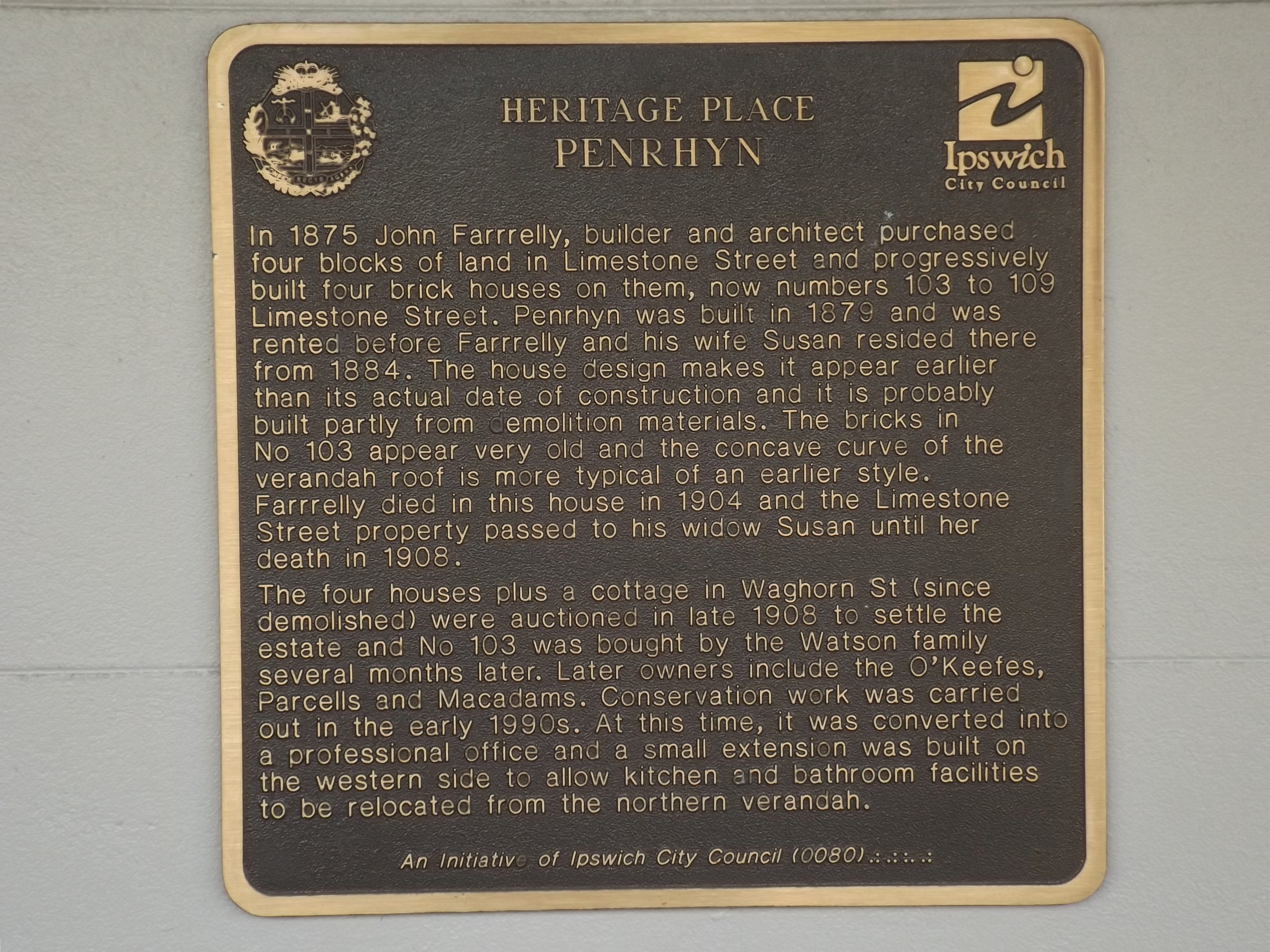
Ipswich City Council plaque on the outside wall

Penrhyn was listed on the Queensland Heritage Register on 21 October 1992 having satisfied the following criteria.

The place demonstrates rare, uncommon or endangered aspects of Queensland's cultural heritage.

Built in 1879, the residence Penrhyn is a rare example of a slate-roofed brick cottage with a concave corrugated galvanised iron verandah roof and it is one of a rare group of four adjacent houses of the c. 1880 period by the same builder/architect.

The place is important because of its aesthetic significance.

It is part of a larger precinct of historic houses grouped around Baines Park and, with its prominent corner position, contributes significantly to the streetscape and exhibits aesthetic characteristics valued by the community.

The place has a special association with the life or work of a particular person, group or organisation of importance in Queensland's history.

It has a special association with builder/architect John Farrelly as his own home and in some of its detailing, is a typical example of his work.
