= Mitchell Robertson (actor) =

Scottish actor

- Born: Cumbernauld, Scotland
- Education: Glasgow Clyde College
- Occupation: Actor
- Years active: 2021-present

Mitchell Robertson is a Scottish actor. On television, he is known for his roles in the BBC One series Mayflies (2022) and Half Man (2026), and the Paramount+ series Curfew (2024). He was named a 2026 Screen International Star of Tomorrow.

== Early life ==
From Cumbernauld, Scotland, Robertson studied acting and performance at Glasgow Clyde College.

== Career ==
Prior prior to beginning to study drama in his final year of school, Robertson had started acting in home-made YouTube videos as a teenager, which led to the creation of independent production co-operative JintyHouse in 2022, through which Robertson both acted in and directed short films. Robertson appeared in a professional capacity on-screen in early roles as young Tibbs in the BBC Two adaptation of Andrew O'Hagan's 2020 novel Mayflies.He also appeared in ITV crime drama series Curfew as well as A Very British Scandal. He also appeared in Athina Rachel Tsangari folk drama film Harvest (2024), opposite Caleb Landry Jones and Harry Melling, and mystery series adaptation Moonflower Murders.

Robertson portrayed the young Niall in Half Man appearing alongside Stuart Campbell as the younger versions played by Jamie Bell and series creator Richard Gadd. Robertson was named a Screen Daily Star of Tomorrow in September 2026. He has an upcoming role in Scotland-set BBC legal drama Counsels and as the male lead in crime drama All The Colours.

== Partial filmography ==
Key
†	Denotes works that have not yet been released

Year	Title	Role	Notes
2021	A Very British Scandal	Lennox	2 episodes
2022	Mayflies	Young Tibbs	2 episodes
2024	Harvest	Christopher Derby	
2024	Curfew	Eddie	6 episodes
2024	Moonflower Murders	Jack Williams	2 episodes
2026	Half Man	Young Niall	3 episodes
TBA	Counsels †	Robbie	
