= Stuart Campbell =

Stuart or Stewart Campbell may refer to:

== Sports ==
- Stewart Campbell (rugby union) (born 1972), Scottish rugby union player
- Stuart Campbell (footballer) (born 1977), English-born Scottish football coach and former player

== Writers, musicians and actors ==
- Steuart Campbell (born 1937), British writer
- Stewart Campbell, musician in The Zephyrs
- Stuart Campbell (blogger), British video game designer and journalist
- Stuart Campbell (journalist) (1908–1966), British newspaper editor
- Stuart Campbell (actor) (born 1998), Scottish actor

== Others ==
- Stewart Campbell (politician) (1812–1885), Canadian lawyer and politician
- Stuart Campbell (explorer) (1903–1988), Australian Antarctic explorer and air force officer
- Stuart Campbell (obstetrician), pioneer in the use of ultrasound in obstetrics
- Stuart James Campbell, British man convicted of murder
- W. Stewart Campbell (?–2009), American production designer and art director
