= Stuart Campbell (actor) =

Scottish actor

- Born: Scotland
- Occupation: Actor
- Years active: 2010s–present
- Notable work: Half Man; The Winter King; SAS: Rogue Heroes; Hetty Feather

Stuart Campbell (born 17 October 1998) is a Scottish actor. He is known for his roles as young Ruben Pallister in the BBC and HBO drama series Half Man, Derfel Cadarn in The Winter King, Bill Fraser in SAS: Rogue Heroes, Jack in Hetty Feather, and Rabbie MacNab in Outlander. In 2019, he was nominated for Best Actor in a Play at The Stage Debut Awards for his performance as Marcus in the Almeida Theatre production of The Hunt.

== Career ==
=== Early work ===
Campbell began acting professionally as a child. In a 2026 interview with The Hollywood Reporter, he said that his first acting job was when he was 13. Campbell appeared as Rabbie MacNab in Outlander and as Jack in the BBC children's drama series Hetty Feather. He also appeared in the BBC Three thriller series Clique, where he worked briefly with writer and actor Richard Gadd.

=== The Hunt ===
In 2019, Campbell made his professional stage debut as Marcus in Rupert Goold's Almeida Theatre production of The Hunt, adapted by David Farr from the 2012 Danish film Jagten. The production starred Tobias Menzies as Lucas, Marcus's father. Reviewing the production for WhatsOnStage, Daisy Bowie-Sell wrote that the scene between Lucas and Marcus "aches with love unexpressed, feelings unspoken". Campbell was nominated for Best Actor in a Play at The Stage Debut Awards for the performance.

=== SAS: Rogue Heroes and The Winter King ===
Campbell appeared in the BBC historical drama series SAS: Rogue Heroes, created by Steven Knight and based on Ben Macintyre's book about the formation of the Special Air Service during the Second World War. He played Bill Fraser, a real-life member of the wartime SAS. Radio Times listed Campbell among the returning cast members for the drama's third series, again as Bill Fraser.

In 2023, Campbell played Derfel Cadarn in the historical fiction series The Winter King, based on Bernard Cornwell's The Warlord Chronicles. Deadline Hollywood reported his casting in the series' ensemble alongside Iain De Caestecker, Eddie Marsan, Nathaniel Martello-White, Valene Kane and Daniel Ings.

=== Half Man ===
In 2026, Campbell played young Ruben Pallister in Half Man, a six-part drama created by Richard Gadd and co-produced by the BBC and HBO. The series follows the relationship between Ruben and Niall Kennedy, played as adults by Gadd and Jamie Bell and as younger men by Campbell and Mitchell Robertson. Campbell originally intended to audition for the role of young Niall, but was asked to read for Ruben instead.

Campbell's performance in Half Man received international press attention. The Hollywood Reporter described him as a breakout star of the series. British GQ described Campbell and Robertson as giving "two of the best performances of the year".

== Filmography ==
Year	Title	Role	Notes	Ref.
2017	Clique	Fraser	Television series	
2017	Outlander	Rabbie MacNab	Television series	
2015–2020	Hetty Feather	Jack	Television series	
2022–present	SAS: Rogue Heroes	Bill Fraser	Television series	
2023	The Winter King	Derfel Cadarn	Television series	
2026	Half Man	Young Ruben Pallister	Television miniseries	

== Theatre ==
Year	Title	Role	Venue	Notes	Ref.
2019	The Hunt	Marcus	Almeida Theatre	Professional stage debut; nominated for Best Actor in a Play at The Stage Debut Awards	

== Awards and nominations ==
Year	Award	Category	Work	Result	Ref.
2019	The Stage Debut Awards	Best Actor in a Play	The Hunt	Nominated	
