= Half Man (TV series) =

2026 British television miniseries

- Release poster
- Genre: Psychological drama
- Created by: Richard Gadd
- Written by: Richard Gadd
- Directed by: Alexandra Brodski; Eshref Reybrouck
- Starring: Jamie Bell; Richard Gadd; Mitchell Robertson; Stuart Campbell
- Composers: Evgueni Galperine; Sacha Galperine
- Country of origin: United Kingdom
- Original language: English
- No. of episodes: 6

Production
- Executive producers: Richard Gadd; Gaynor Holmes; Gavin Smith; Tally Garner; Morven Reid; Sophie Gardiner; Anna O'Malley
- Producer: Wendy Griffin
- Running time: 54–65 minutes
- Production companies: Mam Tor Productions; Thistledown Pictures

Original release
- Network: HBO (United States)
- Release: 23 April – 28 May 2026
- Network: BBC iPlayer (United Kingdom)
- Release: 24 April – 29 May 2026
- Network: BBC One (United Kingdom)
- Release: 28 April – 2 June 2026

Half Man is a six-part psychological drama television miniseries created by Richard Gadd. It is a co-production by Thistledown Pictures and Mam Tor Productions for the BBC and HBO. The series stars Gadd, Jamie Bell, Stuart Campbell, and Mitchell Robertson. It premiered on 23 April 2026 on HBO and 28 April on BBC One (24 April on BBC iPlayer). The drama follows the tumultuous relationship of two men over the course of thirty years.

Half Man received generally positive reviews, with praise for its exploration of toxic masculinity and repression.

== Premise ==
Ruben (Stuart Campbell) and Niall (Mitchell Robertson) grew up as brothers despite not being related by blood—one strong and fiercely loyal, the other quiet and gentle. Thirty years later, they reunite at Niall's (Jamie Bell) wedding, but Ruben (Richard Gadd) seems uneasy and on edge; when a sudden act of violence erupts, it sends the story back through their shared past, revealing how their bond was shaped and how even the closest relationships can ultimately fall apart.

== Cast and characters ==
=== Main ===
- Jamie Bell as Niall Kennedy
  - Mitchell Robertson as young Niall
- Richard Gadd as Ruben Pallister
  - Stuart Campbell as young Ruben

=== Recurring ===
- Neve McIntosh as Lori Kennedy, Niall's mother
- Marianne McIvor as Maura Pallister, Ruben's mother
- Charlie De Melo as Alby Safadi
  - Bilal Hasna as young Alby
- Anjli Mohindra as Ava
- Tim Downie as Daniel
- Tom Andrews as Butch
- Amy Manson as Mona Shiels
  - Charlotte Blackwood as young Mona
- Sandy Batchelor as Gus
  - Piers Ewart as young Gus
- Kate Robson-Stuart as Joanna
  - Julie Cullen as young Joanna
- Stuart McQuarrie as Mr. Jenkins

== Production ==
=== Development ===
The series was announced by BBC One in February 2024. It has Richard Gadd as writer and executive producer. Alexandra Brodski and Eshref Reybrouck directed three episodes each. The series came from the London-based Mam Tor Productions and Thistledown Pictures with Tally Garner and Morven Reid executive producers for Mam Tor alongside Gaynor Holmes for the BBC and Gavin Smith for BBC Scotland. Wendy Griffin served as a producer. In June 2024, HBO joined the project. In November 2024, the project was revealed to have the title Half Man with filming scheduled to commence in Scotland in 2025. Gadd has described the series, previously titled Lions, as being about a pair of brothers. Gadd wrote the role of Niall with Jamie Bell in mind, but had not intended to play Ruben himself until Bell convinced him to.

=== Casting ===
Richard Gadd and Jamie Bell were confirmed in the lead roles in November 2024. In February 2025, Mitchell Robertson, Stuart Campbell, Neve McIntosh, Marianne McIvor, Charlie De Melo, Bilal Hasna, Julie Cullen, Amy Manson, Philippine Velge, Stuart McQuarrie, Piers Ewart, Scot Greenan, Charlotte Blackwood, and Calum Manchip joined the cast.

=== Filming ===
Principal photography began in February 2025. Filming locations include Glasgow, Scotland. In July 2025, it was revealed that filming had been wrapped.

== Episodes ==
No.	Title	Directed by	Written by	Original release date	U.S. airdate
1	"Episode 1"	Alexandra Brodski	Richard Gadd	24 April 2026 (BBC iPlayer); 28 April 2026 (BBC One)	23 April 2026
In 1986, Niall, a shy, bullied, 15-year-old lad, is told by his mother that his violent, 17-year-old "brother", Ruben, will be returning to their home and sharing Niall's room with him. Ruben has recently been released from juvenile prison for biting off a man's nose. On their first night in the shared room, Ruben's father shows up and yells from the street for Ruben to come back with him, and when Niall attempts to go to their mothers for help he grapples him on to the bed and holds them both there overnight. Although Niall is terrified of Ruben, the two eventually bond and begin to look out for one another, with Niall helping Ruben cheat on an exam and Ruben defending Niall from school bullies. Things take an uncomfortable turn when Ruben "assists" Niall with losing his virginity to Ruben's girlfriend, Mona. When Ruben reveals he pre-planned the whole thing, Niall is visibly uncomfortable. In a flash to the present, it is revealed that Niall is getting married and Ruben has gatecrashed the wedding. After the ceremony, Ruben corners and verbally and physically confronts Niall in a barn on the idyllic country property where the wedding is held.
2	"Episode 2"	Alexandra Brodski	Richard Gadd	1 May 2026 (BBC iPlayer); 5 May 2026 (BBC One)	30 April 2026
In 1989, Niall, now 18, goes to university and tries to build a life which excludes Ruben at his mother's behest. Niall struggles socially but eventually befriends his two female flatmates; Joanna and French foreign exchange student Celeste, who takes a romantic interest in Niall, unaware that he is gay and closeted. After a humiliating incident on a night out, Niall calls Ruben to say he needs him. Ruben openly flirts with both girls, much to their shared glee, until Ruben verbally humiliates Joanna and spits in her face. One day, while on an acid trip, Ruben pulls Niall into a dance and tells him that they have to stop his father from receiving custody of his younger brother, but when Niall tries to bring it up another day, he reacts aggressively shuts down any mention of it. Niall develops a secret attraction to Alby, an openly gay student, and the two begin to bond. A game of spin the bottle goads them into kissing, and later Alby and Niall kiss more passionately in private, stopping when Niall panics about Ruben finding out. Alby encourages Niall to come out in order to diminish Ruben's power over him, but Ruben interprets Alby's words as a personal attack and brutally assaults him. Later, it is revealed that the person Niall is marrying is actually Alby, whose face has been permanently disfigured from the assault.
3	"Episode 3"	Alexandra Brodski	Richard Gadd	8 May 2026 (BBC iPlayer); 12 May 2026 (BBC One)	7 May 2026
In 1993, Niall has graduated from University. He and Ruben have had no contact since Alby's assault. Joanna has been making romantic advances towards Niall, which he pretends to reciprocate. Niall is waiting for a letter of confirmation from Oxford University to study for a master's degree, believing this will finally give him the freedom and space from Ruben that he needs. Niall's plans are thwarted when Ruben's and Niall's mothers beg Niall to lie and testify in court that Alby sexually assaulted Ruben, thereby prejudicing the jury against Alby and justifying Ruben's attack as self-defence to help him avoid jail time. Lori is particularly concerned because Maura has cancer and will soon need help at home that Niall won't be there to provide. They persuade him to spend more time with Ruben, who is now working with children and seems to be good at it and happy with them. Niall is conflicted, which upsets Ruben, who angrily screams at him that he should always be on his side, pulling off a road in a rage, damaging the tyres and forcing them to carry supplies to the centre on foot. He instructs Niall to practise saying "He groped you," which Niall cannot do convincingly. When Niall questions why a sexual assault should justify such a violent reaction, Ruben reacts very emotionally, saying that it is an attack on your soul. Later, Ruben makes a rare mention of his father, saying that the only time he ever cried was after he had a heart attack, in response to him coming back home. That night, Niall is able to say "he groped you" with conviction. However, Joanna implores Niall to do what is right, having learnt the truth about the attack and of Niall's homosexuality after speaking with Alby. On the stand, Niall becomes unnerved by the prosecutor's implicitly homophobic line of questioning, arguing that Alby (who spent six months in a coma resulting from Ruben's attack) is a sexual deviant. Ultimately, Niall relents and tells the truth. Ruben viciously screams and lunges at Niall and swears he will exact revenge as he is removed from the courtroom by police officers.
4	"Episode 4"	Eshref Reybrouck	Richard Gadd	15 May 2026 (BBC iPlayer); 19 May 2026 (BBC One)	14 May 2026
In 2008, Niall and Ruben are now 37 and 39, respectively. Ruben was sent to prison for assaulting Alby. Niall struggles with financial problems and completing the latest draft of his new novel, which he pleads with a young local librarian to print out for free. Still insecure and in denial about his sexuality, Niall regularly engages in watching men have sex with each other while he and other men masturbate. One night, he catches his former school bully, Gus, in the act, and the two have a drink and bond over shared troubles. Gus inadvertently reveals that Ruben has received an early release from prison and is living in relative affluence with his wife, Mona, the girl who forced Niall to lose his virginity. Terrified and paranoid, Niall confronts his mother with his fears. She reveals that she knew about Ruben's release from prison and did not tell him. When she also reveals that Ruben has been paying off Niall's debts and has paid for his apartment and car, Niall goes on a rampage, destroying household objects paid for by Ruben and telling his mother he hates him. He also reveals he is being blackmailed for £2,000 by a resentful older librarian who secretly videotaped Niall having sex with men in the library's public toilets. Joanna tells Niall that she cannot help him financially again, and bitterly ends their years-long friendship. Enraged, Niall tracks down Ruben's expensive house and sees him enter it with Mona. In a fit of rage, Niall rips the hood ornament off Ruben's Mercedes-Benz, triggering the alarm. An intense chase between the two ends with Niall hospitalised after the car in which he is trying to escape is hit head-on by another car. When Niall awakens in hospital, Ruben is sitting next to his bed. Ruben physically, sexually, and verbally abuses him. Niall fights back, admitting that while he admires Ruben's power over those around him, he does not think that Ruben is a good person or that he will ever change, blaming both Ruben and Ruben's mother for the way he turned out. When Niall expresses despondency over his life, revealing that he was forced to drop out of university after being hospitalised over obsessions of Ruben coming to get him and admits that he is being blackmailed, Ruben relents and offers to help. The two tearfully embrace. In the present day, police are summoned to Niall's wedding after the ceremony and break down the locked door to a barn where previous episodes have shown Ruben violently attacking Niall. The police carry a man away on a stretcher. Niall's mother breaks through the police line to remove the white sheet covering the face of the victim, revealing him to be Ruben.
5	"Episode 5"	Eshref Reybrouck	Richard Gadd	22 May 2026 (BBC iPlayer); 26 May 2026 (BBC One)	21 May 2026
In 2010, and both Ruben and Niall seem to have adjusted well to their new lives. Ruben is in a seemingly loving marriage with Mona and Niall has been dating Ava, who has just found out she is pregnant. However, after the four of them meet for dinner, Ruben privately demands that Niall immediately repay all of the money he loaned to him. Niall nervously states that he actually spent all of the money and could not afford to give it back, especially because of Ava's pregnancy. Ruben concedes that Niall can do Ruben's housework and gardening for free in exchange for a reduction in the money he owes. Ruben constantly worries that Mona is cheating on him. After a day of gardening and house cleaning, Niall comforts Mona, who is increasingly distraught over Ruben's controlling and abusive influence, encouraging her by reminding her of how "free" she looked dancing back in high school. When she starts teaching dance classes as a self-empowerment project, Ruben is enraged by her self-confidence and independence, claiming that Mona is his "property". Ruben demands that Niall "keep an eye on her" at class, which he reluctantly does. Niall sees Mona hug a male colleague, Benji, but says nothing. Later, he bonds with Mona over drinks, and she reveals that Ruben has low fertility, hates it because he wanted a child to "break the cycle", and is convinced that she will leave him for another man over it. Niall claims he is no longer attracted to men after undergoing conversion therapy. His mother is unconvinced that Niall has successfully "turned straight", but he insists that Ava knows about his "past" and is unbothered by it. Ruben confronts Niall about the debts at his house and Niall tells him Ava is pregnant. Ruben reacts hysterically, tackling Niall to the pavement, and attempts to strip off his clothing before Ava interrupts. Niall later admits to Ava that he spent the money on conversion therapy with a charlatan practitioner and cannot repay the loan. Ava comforts him but leaves Niall when he admits he cheated on her with a male prostitute. Niall reluctantly tells Ruben that he saw Mona and Benji embrace, after which Ruben drives to her house and begins to berate her and throw her property out of the house, until Niall tells him that he will be arrested again if he doesn't leave. While cleaning up the mess in his wake, Niall and Mona spontaneously have sex, but when Niall confronts Mona about it the next day, she indicates she has cheated on Ruben before, including with Benji. Attempting to contact him about Mona's infidelity, Niall discovers that Ruben was fired from his job a year ago and has concocted a complex front to prevent anyone from knowing; he needs the money to maintain his position as provider for his family. Ruben listens to a voicemail that Niall had left earlier mentioning Benji, and when Niall tries to retract it and says there is no proof he mentions the scent of someone else in his bathrobe, which Niall indirectly confirms to avoid confessing that it was him. Ruben drives to Benji's house with Niall desperately following, arriving to find Ruben brutally kicking and stomping Benji's face and body, as he did to Alby. Niall collapses to the floor. In the present day, Ruben locks himself and Niall in the barn.
6	"Episode 6"	Eshref Reybrouck	Richard Gadd	29 May 2026 (BBC iPlayer); 2 June 2026 (BBC One)	28 May 2026
In 2014, Ruben is in jail for attacking Benji (who survived the attack), but he wants to turn his life around for Mona and their son, Baird, born while he was in jail. Niall's semi-autobiographical novel about his experiences with Ruben becomes a hit, but the public is more interested in Ruben than in him. Ruben's mother, Maura, dies, and Niall informs Ruben in prison, causing Ruben to lash out at Niall. Niall's lifestyle of drugs and sex spirals until he reunites with Alby, who is now a nurse at a public clinic which treats sexually transmitted diseases. Years after Ruben's assault on Alby, they rekindle their romance. With Alby's encouragement, and as an alternative to adding to his suspicions about an affair with Mona, Niall visits Ruben in prison and finally comes out to him. To his surprise, Ruben is accepting, having always suspected, and criticises him for wasting his life trying to conform to heteronormative expectations. Niall blames Ruben's constant barrage of hate speech for his self-loathing, but Ruben deflects blame back at Niall for rejecting his own truth. Ruben also reveals he was a victim of sexual assault from his father when he was young, resulting in him feeling like a "half man". The two become open and vulnerable to one another, but the mood abruptly changes when Niall reveals that he had sex with Mona and fathered Baird, saddening and enraging Ruben. In the present, after Niall and Alby's wedding ceremony, Ruben attacks Niall in the barn. In the course of a gruelling fight, Niall stabs Ruben's torso with a sgian dubh (a Scottish ceremonial dagger worn in the stocking) inherited from his father, mortally wounding him, but Ruben smothers Niall to death as he shouts that he loves him. The dying Ruben sits down on a crate, staring at Niall's corpse.

In the scenes from the wedding day intercut with episodes from the past, one can see people from Niall's life among the guests, including his mother, Joanna, Ava, and Gus.

== Release ==
Half Man had its world premiere as the opening series of the 2026 Canneseries. The series premiered on 23 April 2026 on HBO in the US and on BBC iPlayer on 24 April 2026 in the UK, with the BBC One and BBC Scotland broadcast the following week.

== Reception ==
=== Critical response ===
On the review aggregator website Rotten Tomatoes, the series holds an approval rating of 80%, based on 74 critic reviews, with an average rating of 7.3/10. The website's critics consensus reads: "Richard Gadd delivers a broodingly bleak sophomore effort that dares to plumb the depths of toxic masculinity and repression in a complex and unsettling tale that makes for unsettlingly good TV." On Metacritic, which uses a weighted average, the series holds a score of 68 out of 100, based on 30 critics, indicating "generally favorable" reviews.

Reviewing for The Guardian, Lucy Mangan gave the series five stars out of five, writing: "Half Man is a bleak and brilliant thing. It has its weak spots – the women are underwritten ... and I'm not sure I buy the final detonation, which sets up the scene in the barn – but these are quibbles. Gadd's drama is brave and blazing ... If Jack Thorne's Adolescence is to be shown in schools, Half Man needs to be shown in any place men gather."

The Independent critic Nick Hilton was more critical, awarding the series two out of five stars, writing: "It feels like a show in search of meaning, a plot looking for a story – and, frankly, it's a huge misfire ... it's hard to escape the nagging suspicion that Gadd's sophomore programme is a calculated attempt to make something brave and startling and important and all the other adjectives that were applied, more authentically, to Baby Reindeer."

In her review for the BBC, Caryn James gave the series four out of five stars, writing: "Even when the characters are unrelatable, though, Gadd's power as a writer comes through. He doesn't ask for pity for these damaged men. He successfully asks for understanding and sympathy, and does that in his distinct, jolting, culturally resonant voice."

Mike Hale of The New York Times argued that Half Man expands the scale of Baby Reindeer but not its substance. Despite strong acting and occasionally entertaining moments, Hale found the series emotionally shallow and repetitive. By the end, he opined the most sympathetic characters are the people harmed by the protagonist, making it difficult to stay invested in the story.

Carlos Aguilar of the Los Angeles Times described the series as a dark, psychologically rich drama that continues Gadd's interest in trauma and complicated human behavior. Aguilar wrote that while the show is violent and bleak, it aims to provide empathy and context for damaged characters by showing how Niall and Ruben's "cancerous brotherhood threatens to obliterate them both." Writing about the finale, Aaron Balick of GQ praised the show as "far more nuanced than another commentary on 'toxic masculinity'", adding that the reason "Gadd's work is so difficult to watch is that he forces us to bear, rather than split off, the bewildering and paradoxical consequences of trauma".

Inkoo Kang of The New Yorker described Half Man as pushing a male relationship dynamic far beyond familiar TV depictions, calling it "thornier than any other male bond on TV" and "as complicated, codependent, and, at times, troublesomely erotic as it can get." She commented that Half Man is a "richer and more mature" treatment of themes previously explored in Baby Reindeer, such as sexual shame, victimhood, and complicity. Though Kang wrote Ruben can at times feel more "like a cautionary tale than a fully realized character", she praised the writing and portrayal of Niall. She wrote that Jamie Bell, "whose screen roles have long radiated decency and sensitivity, channels that guilelessness once more, only to expose it as yet another façade that helps Niall to conceal his darker impulses".

=== Accolades ===
Year	Award	Category	Nominee(s)	Result	Ref.
2026	Astra TV Awards	Best Limited Series	Half Man	Nominated	
2026	Astra TV Awards	Best Actor in a Limited Series or TV Movie	Richard Gadd	Nominated	
2026	Astra TV Awards	Best Supporting Actor in a Limited Series or TV Movie	Jamie Bell	Nominated	
2026	Dorian TV Awards	Best LGBTQ TV Show	Half Man	Nominated	
2026	Dorian TV Awards	Best TV Movie or Limited Series	Half Man	Won	
2026	Dorian TV Awards	Best Leading TV Performance – Drama	Jamie Bell	Nominated	
2026	Dorian TV Awards	Best Supporting TV Performance – Drama	Richard Gadd	Nominated	
2026	Gotham TV Awards	Outstanding Limited or Anthology Series	Richard Gadd	Nominated	
2026	Gotham TV Awards	Outstanding Lead Performance in a Limited or Anthology Series	Jamie Bell	Nominated	
2026	National Film Awards	Best TV Drama Series	Half Man	Nominated	
2026	National Film Awards	Best Producer – Film & TV	Tally Garner, Morven Reid, and Richard Gadd	Nominated	
2026	National Film Awards	Best Actor in a TV Series	Richard Gadd	Nominated	
2026	National Film Awards	Best Supporting Actor in a TV Series	Jamie Bell	Nominated	
2026	National Film Awards	Best Supporting Actress in a TV Series	Anjli Mohindra	Nominated	
2026	Primetime Creative Arts Emmy Awards	Outstanding Supporting Actor in a Limited or Anthology Series or Movie	Richard Gadd	Nominated	
2026	TCA Awards	Outstanding Achievement in Movies, Miniseries or Specials	Half Man	Nominated	
