= Tobias Menzies =

English actor (born 1974)

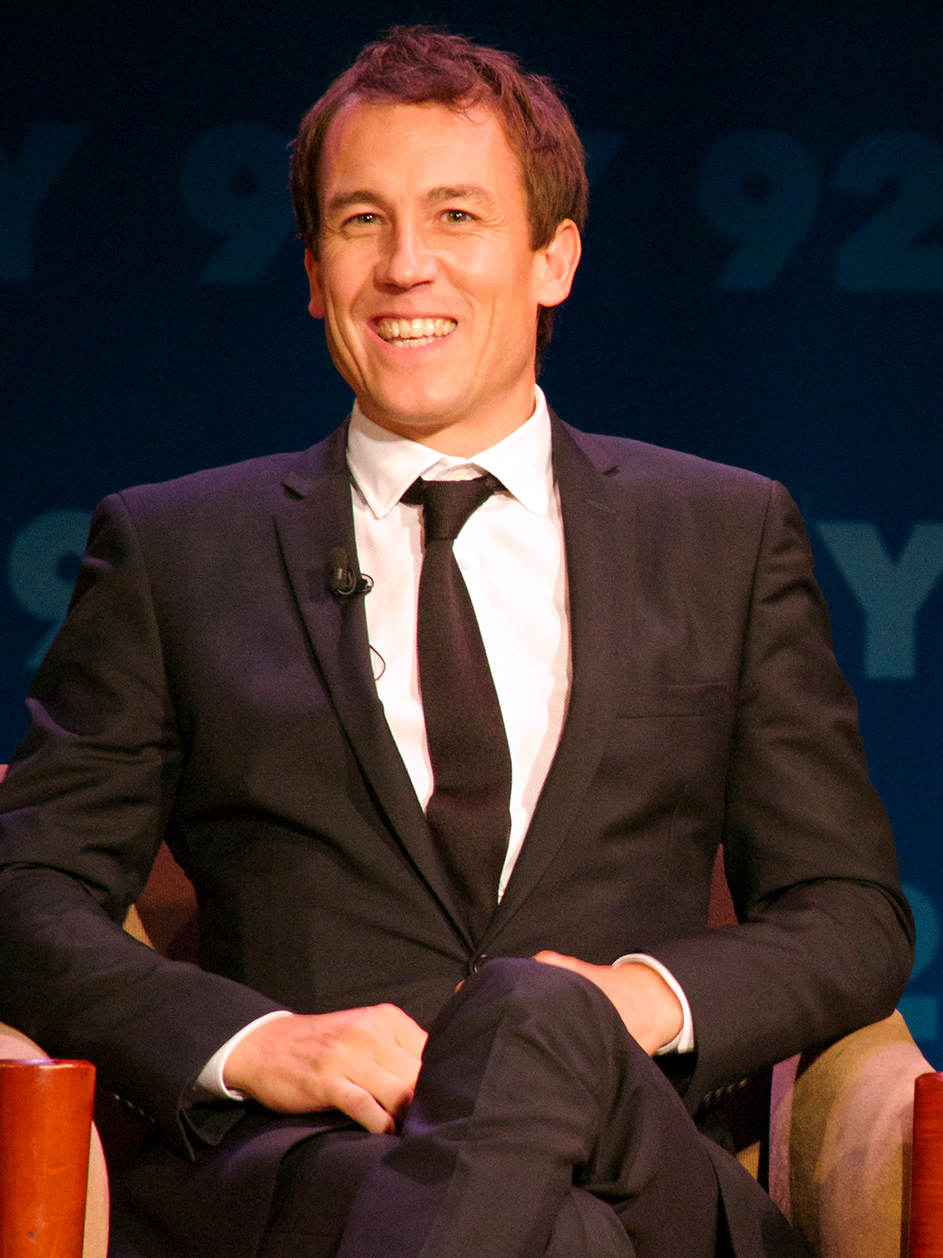
- Menzies at the Outlander premiere in New York, 2014
- Born: 7 March 1974 (age 52); Hammersmith, London, England
- Education: Frensham Heights School; Stratford-upon-Avon College; Royal Academy of Dramatic Art (BA, 1998)
- Occupation: Actor
- Years active: 1998–present

Tobias Simpson Menzies (born 7 March 1974) is an English actor. He is known for playing Prince Philip, Duke of Edinburgh, in the third and fourth seasons of the series The Crown, for which he won the Primetime Emmy Award for Outstanding Supporting Actor in a Drama Series and received Golden Globe and British Academy Television Award nominations. Menzies also played Frank and Jonathan "Black Jack" Randall in Starz's Outlander, for which he received a Golden Globe Award nomination, in addition to his roles as Brutus in Rome and Edmure Tully in Game of Thrones.

== Early years ==
Menzies was born in Hammersmith, London, England, the son of Peter Menzies and Gillian (née Simpson). His mother was a teacher and his father a BBC radio producer. He has one younger brother, Luke, who is a banker (previously solicitor). Menzies attended the Perry Court Rudolf Steiner School in Canterbury, Kent, where he was trained in the Steiner System, which includes movement, singing and instrumental music. Then, he attended the Frensham Heights School, near Farnham in Surrey, at the same time as Hattie Morahan and Jim Sturgess.

Menzies attended Deborah Moody's Year Out Drama Company in Stratford-upon-Avon from 1993 to 1994 before enrolling in the Royal Academy of Dramatic Art, eventually graduating with a BA Degree in Acting (1998). Upon completion of his BA, Menzies participated in improvisation workshops through The Spontaneity Shop, a British improvisation comedy company, as part of a graduate scheme through RADA.

== Career ==
=== Television ===
Menzies' first professional television role, beginning in 1998, was an eleven-episode stint on BBC's long-running medical drama Casualty. Then he featured in director David Attwood's made-for-TV film Summer in the Suburbs and a series-three episode of ITV's crime drama Midsomer Murders. In 2002, Menzies portrayed Vince in ITV's romantic comedy series I Saw You, appeared in three episodes of SAS drama Ultimate Force and featured in a series-one episode of WWII drama Foyle's War. He also appeared in made-for-television film A Very Social Secretary, directed by Jon Jones, which launched UK Channel 4's spin-off station, More4.

From 2005 to 2007, Menzies portrayed Marcus Junius Brutus, Julius Caesar's friend and later co-assassin, in the HBO/BBC historical drama series Rome (2005–07). He next appeared as William Elliot in ITV's production of Jane Austen's classic Persuasion, and Derrick Sington in Channel 4's feature-length drama The Relief of Belsen, which chronicled the British liberation of Bergen-Belsen concentration camp at the end of WWII. In 2008, Menzies starred in two stylistically different miniseries; the first was BBC's anthology mini-series Fairy Tales, in an episode entitled The Empress's New Clothes, where he portrayed Aidee. The second was the series finale of BBC's Bonekickers, which followed a team of British archaeologists as they investigated mysteries and conspiracy theories surrounding historical artifacts. The next year saw Menzies return to episodic television, with roles in ITV's legal drama Kingdom, alongside Stephen Fry, a special episode of BBC's comedy Pulling and several episodes of BBC One's spy drama Spooks.

The Deep, BBC's 2010 science fiction-thriller mini-series set on submarines in the deep waters below Arctic ice, saw Menzies star alongside Minnie Driver and James Nesbitt. That same year he portrayed real-life Naval Intelligence officer Ian Fleming in PBS's mini-series Any Human Heart, an adaptation of William Boyd's 2002 novel, which chronicled historical events through fictional protagonist Logan Mountstuart. He would go on to feature in a series four episode of ITV's Law & Order: UK, a British adaptation of Dick Wolf's long-running American procedural franchise. In 2011, Menzies featured as tabloid journalist Ross McGovern in BBC Two's seven part mini-series The Shadow Line, opposite Stephen Rea and Chiwetel Ejiofor. The next year, in ITV's supernatural courtroom drama Eternal Law, Menzies portrayed a fallen angel who had become a prosecuting attorney in York, England. He would go on to feature in an episode of BBC Two's political satire The Thick of It, an episode of Channel 4's political thriller mini-series Secret State, three episodes of BBC's medical satire Getting On, and two episodes of BBC's Shakespearean documentary Simon Schama's Shakespeare.

In 2013, Menzies first appeared as Edmure Tully, the heir to House Tully of Riverrun, in HBO's Game of Thrones, which was based upon George R. R. Martin's fantasy book series A Song of Ice and Fire. The role was recurring, with Menzies' final appearance occurring in the 2019 series finale. That same year, Menzies starred in the series two finale of Channel 4's anthology series Black Mirror, and a two episode stint on BBC's long-running crime drama Silent Witness. 2014 saw Menzies portray Maggie Gyllenhaal's bodyguard, Nathaniel Bloom, in the BBC's Emmy nominated mini-series The Honourable Woman, and Alexander in the series premier of BBC's dog training comedy Puppy Love. The same year, Menzies first appeared in time travel drama series, Outlander, which is based upon author Diana Gabaldon's best-selling series of novels. He portrayed the recurring dual roles of Frank Randall, a 20th-century historian, and Jonathan "Black Jack" Randall, his brutal 18th-century ancestor. From 2015 to 2019, Menzies appeared in the recurring role of Dr. Harries, OB/GYN to lead character Sharon, in Amazon's original series Catastrophe.

BBC One's adaptation of John le Carré's espionage novel The Night Manager saw Menzies, opposite Tom Hiddleston and Hugh Laurie, in the role of British intelligence director Geoffrey Dromgoole, in the spring of 2016. That same year, he starred in Channel 4's series pilot The Circuit, a comedy set at a neighborhood dinner party. In 2017, in his first voice over work on television, Menzies portrayed Mandalorian warrior Tiber Saxon on Disney XD's animated series Star Wars Rebels. It was announced in 2016 that Menzies had been cast as James Fitzjames, Captain of the Royal Navy vessel HMS Erebus, in AMC's anthology series The Terror. The series, based upon Dan Simmons' 2007 novel of the same name, chronicled a fictionalized account of real-life expeditionary ships HMS Erebus and HMS Terror during the third Franklin Expedition of the Arctic in 1848. That same year, he appeared as the Duke of Cornwall in BBC Two's adaptation of Shakespeare's tragedy King Lear, opposite Anthony Hopkins and Emily Watson.

In March 2018, it was announced that Menzies had been cast to portray Prince Philip, the Duke of Edinburgh, in seasons 3 and 4 of Netflix's historical drama series The Crown, opposite Olivia Colman as Queen Elizabeth II. His performance in the series earned him the Primetime Emmy Award for Outstanding Supporting Actor in a Drama Series, in addition to nominations for the Golden Globe Award for Best Actor – Television Series Drama, the British Academy Television Award for Best Supporting Actor, the Critics' Choice Television Award for Best Actor in a Drama Series and the Critics' Choice Television Award for Best Supporting Actor in a Drama Series. He was also a part of the ensemble cast that won the Screen Actors Guild Award for Outstanding Performance by an Ensemble in a Drama Series in 2019 and 2020.

Menzies was announced, in June 2019, as a cast member for the Channel 4/Hulu original series This Way Up, a comedy set around the life of an English as a Second/Foreign Language (ESL/EFL) teacher, from actress and writer Aisling Bea. In January 2022, he was set to lead limited drama series Manhunt created by Monica Beletsky, based on the book Manhunt: The 12-Day Chase for Lincoln's Killer by James Swanson.

In September 2025, it was announced he joined Channel 4's Maya, starring Bella Ramsey.

=== Film ===
Menzies' first professional film role was 2000's dramatic comedy The Low Down, opposite Aidan Gillen, which premiered at the Locarno Film Festival. His next role, in Miramax's 2004 biographical drama Finding Neverland, saw Menzies feature opposite Johnny Depp's J.M. Barrie, the creator of beloved children's character Peter Pan. The next year, Menzies appeared in the romantic comedy Piccadilly Jim, opposite Sam Rockwell, and director Adrian Shergold's drama Pierrepoint: The Last Hangman, opposite Timothy Spall. He also featured in Casino Royale, Columbia Pictures' 2006 reboot of the James Bond film franchise, as personal aide to M, chief of British secret intelligence agency Mi6.

In 2007, Menzies portrayed a Naval officer on the beaches of Normandy, opposite James McAvoy, in the Academy Award-nominated adaptation of Ian McEwan's WWII drama Atonement. The Rose Theatre, an Elizabethan theatre outside London, produced a short video which was shown in 2009, and featured Menzies in the role of Mephistophilis, in Christopher Marlowe's play Doctor Faustus. He would go on to appear in three films in 2010. The first was Independent Pictures' adaptation of Russian author Anton Chekhov's The Duel, where he portrayed Von Koren. Second was Swipe Films' production of Jackboots on Whitehall, an animated film featuring puppets. Menzies, alongside Alan Cumming and Timothy Spall, provided voice work for the comedy spoof, which explored the idea of Nazis invading the United Kingdom at the end of WWII. In his third film of 2010, Menzies starred opposite Genevieve O'Reilly in the drama Forget Me Not, an independent film which premiered at the Culver Plaza Theater in Culver City, CA.

The dramatic comedy Hysteria (2011) featured Menzies, opposite Maggie Gyllenhaal and Hugh Dancy, in the story of the creation of the first Victorian era vibrator. That same year, he would feature in writer Andrew Steggall's short film The Door, an official selection at the 28th annual Warsaw International Film Festival, which was based upon the tale The Door in the Wall by H.G. Wells. In 2012, Menzies starred in director Carrie Cracknell's Nora, a short film inspired by the Young Vic's theatrical production of Henrik Ibsen's play A Doll's House. His next film was 2014's thriller The Birthday Gift, a short film which was screened at the Aesthetica Short Film Festival that year. Menzies would go on to star in the short film/micro-play Groove is in the Heart, a collaboration between the Royal Court Theatre and The Guardian, which was screened at the BFI London Film Festival, and submarine action film Black Sea, a modern-day pirate thriller, opposite Jude Law.

2016 saw Menzies feature in three films. First was director Benedict Andrews' forbidden relationship drama Una, which was based upon the play Blackbird from Scottish playwright David Harrower, followed by filmmaker James Hughes' experimental film The Velvet Abstract, which saw Menzies provide narration, and was screened at the New Renaissance Film Festival. Last was Underworld: Blood Wars, the fifth installment in the Underworld franchise, with Menzies starring as the main antagonist, Marius, opposite Kate Beckinsale's Selene.

In August 2017, it was announced that Menzies had been cast in director Emily Harris' adaptation of Carmilla, a fantasy film based upon the Gothic novella of the same name by Joseph Thomas Sheridan Le Fanu.

=== Theatre ===
Menzies' theatrical debut was in Hristo Boytchev's comedy The Colonel Bird, which ran at The Gate London in 1999. The next year, he featured in The Royal Exchange's presentation of The Way of the World, a production of playwright William Cosgreve's 1700s grandiloquent play of manners and Complicité theatre company's Light, an adaptation of author Torgny Lindgren's novel Ljuset (1987). In late 2001, Menzies appeared in Almeida Theatre's production of Anton Checkhov's play Platonov, an adaptation of the early, unnamed play that was Checkhov's first large scale drama. The next year, he portrayed Valentine in the Royal Theatre's production of Tom Stoppard's tragic comedy Arcadia.

Between 2003 and 2005, Menzies would co-star in the anti-war drama Serjeant Musgrave's Dance at the Everyman Theatre, and would portray the young teacher Irwin in Alan Bennett's The History Boys, which Nicholas Hytner directed at the Royal National Theatre. Of his role in The History Boys, one reviewer wrote:

There is a remarkable performance, too, from Tobias Menzies as the slick supply-teacher historian, who believes academic success is merely a matter of tricks and spin. But Menzies also discovers a surprisingly attractive vulnerability in the character I missed the first time around.

— Charles Spencer, The Telegraph

He would go on to star in Michael Blakemore's West End production of Three Sisters, for which he was nominated for the Ian Charleson Award, and the title role in Rupert Goold's production of Hamlet, at the Royal Theatre, Northampton. Of his role in Hamlet, one reviewer wrote:

One of Shakespeare's greatest innovations was to dramatise people's thought processes: the articulation of the mind's search for meaning and identity. This is where Menzies' performance is most thrilling. He shows how language strives to express the self and to pin down the truth. Who am I? What do I think and feel? Menzies' delivery of the "To be or not to be..." speech burns with intelligence. This is one of the finest and most exciting Hamlets I've seen. Observe his face: it seems to mature, grow softer, more observant and expressive, and his death becomes a fulfilment as well as a failure

— John Peter, The Sunday Times

Menzies took on a supporting role in Playhouse Theatre's 2006 presentation of Pirandello's play As You Desire Me. The next year, he would feature in two productions. First was the role of Peter Trifimov in Chekhov's The Cherry Orchard at Sheffield's Crucible Theatre, followed by a turn as Harry Bagley in Almeida Theatre's production of Caryl Churchill's politically sexual comedy Cloud Nine. Late 2008 saw Menzies portray Edgar opposite Pete Postlethwaite in Liverpool Playhouse's production of King Lear, which continued with a run at London's Young Vic Theatre in early 2009.

In 2011, Menzies featured as Dr. Joseph Cardin, opposite Keira Knightley's Karen Wright, in Lillian Hellman's 1934 drama The Children's Hour, which focuses on the harmful effects of wrongful accusations and rumors. He would go on that same year to star in director Rupert Goold's Decade, a play presented through a series of short vignettes penned to mark the tenth anniversary of the September 11th attacks on the World Trade Center in New York City. George Farquhar's 1706 play The Recruiting Officer, which was based upon the methods used by the British Army to recruit troops during the War of the Spanish Succession, saw Menzies star as Captain Plume during the first quarter of 2012. The next year, he would feature in director Carey Cracknell's Rough Cuts: Searched, at the Royal Court Theatre, and star in National Theatre's experimental play The Hush, which explored the connection between sound and memory.

Wallace Shawn's monologue play The Fever, which explored the main character's internal struggle with the morality of a privileged existence, saw Menzies perform to a micro audience at London's decadent May Fair Hotel in early 2015. Director Robert Icke purposely staged the play, produced by Almeida Theatre, at the May Fair Hotel in order to assist the small audience to better internalize its meaning. That same year, he would join an extensive cast for a sixteen-hour production of Homer's The Iliad, performed throughout the day at the British Museum and concluding at the Almeida Theatre, as well as being broadcast live. Working again with director Robert Icke, 2016 would see Menzies star in a modernised interpretation of Chekhov's Uncle Vanya prior to performing dramatic readings of selected sonnets by Shakespeare in Middle Temple Hall's choral programme The Dark Lady and the Tender Churl. Two years later, Menzies would return to the Almeida in their digital theatre production Figures of Speech, which highlighted performances of well known historical speeches. He appeared in series three of the project, which has featured artists such as Ian McKellen, Fiona Shaw, and Andrew Scott.

Early 2019 saw Menzies appear in the Gate Theatre's production of Sarah Ruhl's Dear, Elizabeth. The play, which dramatized letters between American poets Elizabeth Bishop and Robert Lowell, featured two different actors each night of the show's run. Later that year, Menzies starred in Almeida Theatre's production of The Hunt, which was set in Denmark and adapted from 2012's thriller film Jagten (The Hunt). The production ran from mid June to early August 2019. His performance garnered positive reviews, with Henry Hitchings of Evening Standard writing, "Tobias Menzies's performance as Lucas is finely controlled — a quietly devastating portrait of a man whose lonely fight to preserve his dignity takes him to the brink of madness."

In 2024, Menzies was cast as Chris in the National Theatre's adaptation of Alexander Zeldin's The Other Place. The production ran from September to November 2024, and saw Menzies acting alongside actors Emma D'Arcy and Alison Oliver. His performance as Chris, a modernized version of Creon (king of Thebes) in the tale of Antigone, was highly praised by critics. Sarah Crompton for WhatsOnStage.com wrote how he was "towering as Chris, his constantly twitching hands displaying his anxiousness even when he is at his most urbane, his rocking on his feet conveying a man on the edge, desperately fighting for control and his sanity. (Menzies) is an actor of incredible stillness too; he doesn't react, he simply seems to feel", whilst Nick Curtis for the Evening Standard wrote that his performance portrayed "a finely detailed picture of a man who wants to be the 'fun uncle' and the matey stepdad but is implacable when his authority is challenged".

Most recently, The Other Place was transferred to New York City for a run at The Shed, which ran from 31 January to 1 March 2026. The New York Times writer Helen Shaw praised Menzies' performance, writing how he "thrum[med] with destabilizing tension", though largely criticising Zeldin's writing. Frank Scheck, writing for the website New York Stage Review, also commended Menzies, who "compellingly convey[ed] a volcanic emotionality hiding underneath a seemingly controlled, placid surface".

=== Radio ===
Menzies' first professional radio performance was 2010's drama A Nice Little Holiday, the story of British playwright John Osborne's 1961 besieged holiday in the South of France, which aired on BBC Radio 4 in September of that year. The next year, he would read an abridgement of Matthew Hollis' biography of poet and literary critic Edward Thomas, best known for his poem Adelstrop, on BBC Radio 4's series Book of the Week. In his third collaboration with BBC Radio 4, Menzies was the voice of John Charrington's Wedding (2012), the second episode of a five-part series titled Ghost Stories of E Nesbit. 2013's three-part radio drama, commissioned by BBC Radio 4, saw Menzies portray British writer and National Trust supporter James Lees-Milne, opposite Victoria Hamilton as novelist Nancy Mitford. The series consisted of three interconnected plays, based upon his WWII era journals, cataloging the decline of the English country house and titled Sometimes into the Arms of God, The Unending Battle, and What England Owes. That same year, he would star in BBC Radio 3's drama Serious Money, adapted for radio by Emma Harding from Caryl Churchill's play of the same name, and BBC Radio 4's political drama Every Duchess In England, based upon Parliament's response to England's financial crisis of 1931.

In 2014, Menzies featured in a five-part series for BBC Radio 4's Book of the Week where he read Laurie Lee's As I Walked Out One Midsummer Morning, an account of his travels in 1930s Spain, in sections released over a five-day period. He would go on the next year to star as Andy Warhol in Sarah Wooley's BBC Radio 4 drama Fifteen Minutes, opposite Adrian Rawlins, and a second five-part Book of the Week series where he, along with the author, would read British travel writer Robert Macfarlane's celebration of language, Landmarks. 2016 would see Menzies in another series which combined literary readings and music in an episode of BBC Radio 3's Words and Music series entitled Trapped. The episode explored both physical and mental entrapment with readings, including authors such as George Orwell and Charlotte Brontë, by both Menzies and Kate Phillips. He would also feature in BBC Radio 4's Comment Is Free, a political and social commentary focusing on a wife, portrayed by Rachael Stirling, who is forced to watch both the public and media eviscerate her husband's story.

Once again reading for BBC radio 4's series Book of the Week, Menzies narrated author Philip Hoare's exploration of our fascination with water and the sea in 2017's five-part RISINGTIDEFALLINGSTAR.

== Acting credits ==
=== Television ===
Year	Title	Role	Notes
1998–2000	Casualty	Frank Gallagher	11 episodes
2000	Longitude	Halley's Secretary	Television film
2000	Summer in the Suburbs	School Psychologist	Television film
2000	Midsomer Murders	Jack Dorset	Episode: "Judgement Day"
2002	The Escapist	Policeman	
2002	I Saw You	Vince	Miniseries, 3 episodes
2002	Ultimate Force	Box 500	3 episodes
2002	Foyle's War	Stanley Ellis	Episode: "The White Feather"
2005	A Very Social Secretary	Keith	Television film
2005–2007	Rome	Marcus Junius Brutus	Main cast, 17 episodes
2007	Persuasion	William Elliot	Television film
2007	The Relief of Belsen	Derrick Sington	Television film
2008	Fairy Tales	Aidee	Episode: "The Empress's New Clothes"
2008	Bonekickers	Scott Wilson	Episode: "Follow the Gleam'
2009	Kingdom	David Morston	1 episode
2009	Pulling	Stephan	1 episode
2009	Spooks	Andrew Lawrence	2 episodes
2010	The Deep	Raymond	5 episodes
2010	Any Human Heart	Ian Fleming	2 episodes
2011	The Shadow Line	Ross McGovern	Miniseries, 5 episodes
2012	Eternal Law	Richard Pembroke	Main cast, 6 episodes
2012	Simon Schama's Shakespeare	Henry V	Miniseries, Documentary
2012	Secret State	Charles Flyte	1 episode
2012	The Thick of It	Simon Weir	1 episode
2012	Getting On	Dr. Tom Kersley	3 episodes
2013	Black Mirror	Liam Monroe	Episode: "The Waldo Moment"
2013	Doctor Who	Lieutenant Stepashin	Episode "Cold War"
2013	Up All Night	Narrator (voice)	TV series documentary, episode: "The Nightclub Toilet"
2013	Imagine	Narrator (voice)	TV series documentary, episode: "Edmund De Waal: Make Pots or Die"
2013–2019	Game of Thrones	Edmure Tully	9 episodes
2014	Silent Witness	Greg Walker	Episode: "Coup de Grace" (2 parts)
2014	Puppy Love	Alexander	1 episode
2014	The Honourable Woman	Nathaniel Bloom	Miniseries, 3 episodes
2014–2018	Outlander	Professor Frank Randall / Jonathan "Black Jack" Randall	Main cast, 24 episodes
2015–2019	Catastrophe	Dr Kenneth Harries	5 episodes
2016	The Night Manager	Geoffrey Dromgoole	Miniseries, 5 episodes
2016	The Circuit	Sasha	Television film
2017	Star Wars Rebels	Tiber Saxon (voice)	2 episodes
2018	The Terror	James Fitzjames	Miniseries, main cast
2018	King Lear	Duke of Cornwall	Television film
2019–2020	The Crown	Prince Philip, Duke of Edinburgh	Main role (Seasons 3–4)
2019–2021	This Way Up	Richard	10 episodes
2021	Modern Love	Van	Episode: "A Second Embrace, with Hearts and Eyes Open"
2024	Manhunt	Edwin Stanton	Miniseries
2025	A Ghost Story for Christmas: The Room in the Tower	Roger Winstanley	Lead role
2025	The American Revolution (TV series)	Edmund Burke (Voice)	TV documentary
2026	Maya	Bobby	
TBA	Nobody Listens Anymore	Martin	Post-production

=== Film ===
Year	Title	Role	Notes
1998	The Audition		Short film
2000	The Low Down	John	
2002	The Knowledge	David	Short film
2004	Piccadilly Jim	Reg	
2004	Finding Neverland	Theatre Patron	
2005	Pierrepoint	Lt. Llewelyn	Titled Pierrepoint: The Last Hangman in the US
2006	Casino Royale	Villiers	M's assistant
2007	Atonement	Naval Officer	
2009	The Genius of Christopher Marlowe	Mephistophilis	Rose Theatre Bankside film
2010	Jackboots on Whitehall	Captain English (voice)	Spoof war film using puppets
2010	The Duel	Von Koren	Adaptation of an 1891 novella by Anton Chekhov, The Duel
2010	Forget Me Not	Will	
2011	The Door	Man with the Wings of a Swan	Short film
2011	Hysteria	Mr. Squyers	
2012	Nora	Richard	Short film
2014	The Birthday Gift	David	Short film
2014	Black Sea	Lewis	
2014	Off the Page: Groove Is in the Heart	Mark	Short film London Film Festival 2015 official selection
2016	Una	Mark	
2016	The Velvet Abstract	Narrator	Short film
2016	Underworld: Blood Wars	Marius	
2019	Carmilla	Family doctor	
2023	You Hurt My Feelings	Don	
2025	F1	Peter Banning	
TBA	The Entertainment System Is Down †		Post-production

=== Theatre ===
Year	Title	Role	Venue	Ref(s)
1999	The Colonel Bird	Deaf Actor	Gate Theatre	
2000	The Way of the World	Witwoud	Royal Exchange Theatre	
2000	Light	Olavus/Priest	Complicité theatre company/Almeida Theatre	
2001	Over the Rainbow		Donmar Warehouse	
2001	Platonov	Sergei Voynitzev	Almeida Theatre	
2002	Arcadia	Valentine Coverly	Royal Theatre	
2003	Three Sisters	Tusenbach	Playhouse Theatre	
2003	Serjeant Musgrave's Dance	Hurst	Oxford Stage Company	
2005	Hamlet	Hamlet	Royal Theatre	
2005	The History Boys	Irwin	Royal National Theatre	
2005	The History Boys	Irwin	Touring cast	
2006	As You Desire Me		Playhouse Theatre	
2007	The Cherry Orchard	Peter Trofimov	Crucible Theatre	
2007	Cloud Nine	Harry Bagley/Martin	Almeida Theatre	
2007	Get Tested	Daniel	Old Vic	
2008–2009	King Lear	Edgar	Liverpool Playhouse	
2008–2009	King Lear	Edgar	Young Vic Theatre	
2011	The Children's Hour	Dr Joseph Cardin	Comedy Theatre	
2011	Decade	Scott Forbes	Headlong	
2012	The Recruiting Officer	Captain Plume	Donmar Warehouse	
2013	Rough Cuts: Searched		Royal Court Theatre	
2013	The Hush	Man	Shed for the Royal National Theatre	
2015	The Fever	Man	Almeida Theatre (performances at the May Fair Hotel)	
2015	The Iliad	Narrator	Almeida Theatre	
2016	Uncle Vanya	Dr. Michael Astrov	Almeida Theatre	
2016	The Dark Lady and the Tender Churl	Narrator	Middle Temple Hall	
2018	Figures of Speech (Series 3)	Chaim Mordechai Rumkowski	Almeida Theatre (digital performance)	
2019	Dear, Elizabeth	Robert Lowell	Gate Theatre	
2019	The Hunt	Lucas	Almeida Theatre	
2024	The Hunt	Lucas	St. Ann's Warehouse	
2024	The Other Place	Chris	Lyttelton Theatre	
2026	The Other Place	Chris	The Shed	

=== Radio ===
Year	Title	Role	Notes
2010	A Nice Little Holiday	Tony Richardson	BBC Radio 4
2011	Now All Roads Lead to France	Narrator	BBC Radio 4
2012	John Charrington's Wedding	Narrator	BBC Radio 4 Extra
2013	Plays inspired by James Lees-Milne diaries: Sometimes into the Arms of God; The Unending Battle; What England Owes	James Lees-Milne	BBC Radio 4
2013	Serious Money	Zak Zackerman	BBC Radio 3
2013	Every Duchess In England	Oswald Mosley	BBC Radio 4
2014	As I Walked Out One Midsummer Morning	Narrator	BBC Radio 4
2015	Landmarks	Narrator	BBC Radio 4
2015	Fifteen Minutes	Andy Warhol	BBC Radio 4
2016	Trapped	Narrator	BBC Radio 3
2016	Comment Is Free	Ben	BBC Radio 4
2017	RISINGTIDEFALLINGSTAR	Narrator	BBC Radio 4

== Awards and nominations ==
Year	Award	Category	Nominated work	Result	Ref(s)
2003	Ian Charleson Awards	Commendation for the best classical stage performance in Britain by actor under age 30	Three Sisters	Nominated	
2015	Saturn Awards	Best Actor on Television	Outlander	Nominated	
2015	EWwy Awards	Best Supporting Actor in a Drama Series	Outlander	Won	
2016	Golden Globe Awards	Best Supporting Actor – Series, Miniseries or Television Film	Outlander	Nominated	
2016	Satellite Awards	Best Television Ensemble	Outlander	Won	
2020	Golden Globes Awards	Best Actor – Television Series Drama	The Crown	Nominated	
2020	Critics' Choice Television Awards	Best Actor in a Drama Series	The Crown	Nominated	
2020	Screen Actors Guild Awards	Outstanding Performance by an Ensemble in a Drama Series	The Crown	Won	
2020	Satellite Awards	Best Actor in a Television Series – Drama	The Crown	Won	
2021	Critics' Choice Television Awards	Best Supporting Actor in a Drama Series	The Crown	Nominated	
2021	Satellite Awards	Best Actor – Television Series Drama	The Crown	Nominated	
2021	Screen Actors Guild Awards	Outstanding Performance by an Ensemble in a Drama Series	The Crown	Won	
2021	British Academy Television Awards	Best Supporting Actor	The Crown	Nominated	
2021	Primetime Emmy Awards	Outstanding Supporting Actor in a Drama Series	The Crown	Won	
2024	Drama Desk Awards	Outstanding Lead Performance in a Play	The Hunt	Nominated	
2024	Drama League Awards	Distinguished Performance	The Hunt	Nominated	
