= The Hunt (play) =

2019 play by David Farr

- Original language: English
- Written by: David Farr
- Subject: A male school teacher is falsely accused of sexual abuse.
- Genre: Drama

Premiere
- Date: 17 June 2019
- Place: Almeida Theatre; London

The Hunt is a play by the British playwright David Farr. The modern day parable revolves around a school teacher who is wrongly accused of sexual abuse. The play is based on the 2012 film of the same name directed by Thomas Vinterberg.

Directed by Rupert Goold, it also features a leading performance from Tobias Menzies as well as scenic design by Es Devlin. It received its premiere at the West End's Almeida Theatre in June 2019 and had its New York transfer at St. Ann's Warehouse in Brooklyn, New York City, in 2024.

== Synopsis ==
In a small town in northern Denmark, the children celebrate Harvest Festival. A man, Lucas is going through a tough divorce fighting for child custody of his son. He works as a school teacher for an elementary school where he is popular amongst kids, staff and parents until he is wrongly accused of sexual abuse. The small town community closes in on Lucas.

== Cast and characters ==
Character	Almeida Theatre, London 2019	St. Ann's Warehouse, NYC 2024
Lucas	Tobias Menzies	Tobias Menzies
Hilde	Michele Austin	Lolita Chakrabarti
Mikala	Poppy Miller	MyAnna Buring
Theo	Alex Hassell	Justin Salinger
Marcus	Stuart Campbell	Raphael Casey
Rune	Adrian Der Gregorian	Adrian Der Gregorian
Palme / Dance Captain	Jethro Skinner	Ali Goldsmith
Thomas	Itoya Osagiede	Shaquille Jack
Gunner	Danny Kirrane	Danny Kirrane
Ragnar	Keith Higham	Jonathan Savage
Per / Pastor	Howard Ward	Howard Ward
Peter	Harrison Houghton / George Nearn Stuart	Rumi C. Jean-Louis / Christopher Riley
Clara	Abbiegail Mills / Taya Tower / Florence White	Aerina DeBoer / Kay Winard

== Production history ==
=== 2019 Almeida Theatre ===
The production was first helmed at the Almeida Theatre which ran from June 17 through August 3, 2019. It starred Tobias Menzies, Poppy Miller, and Michele Austin and was directed by Rupert Goold. It was written by David Farr who adapted the play off the 2012 Danish film of the same name directed by Thomas Vinterberg and written by Vinterberg and Tobias Lindholm. The scenic designer was Es Devlin with the light design by Neil Austin and sound and composition work being done by Adam Cork.

=== 2024 Off-Broadway ===
In 2024 it was announced the New York transfer of The Hunt would be at St. Ann's Warehouse in Brooklyn, New York. Performances ran from February 16 through March 24. Returning to the production was its director Rupert Goold and star Tobias Menzies. Replacements included Lolita Chakrabarti taking over for Michele Austin who took a role in Lucy Prebble's The Effect at The Shed. Poppy Miller was replaced by MyAnna Buring with Adrian Der Gregorian and Danny Kirrane both returning.

== Response ==
=== Critical reviews ===
The debut production at the Almeida Theatre received mixed to positive reviews. Ann Trenneman of The Daily Telegraph wrote a rave review declaring that the production was "a world-class adaptation of a dark Danish parable for our times". Michael Billington of The Guardian gave the production a mixed review, while praising its "skillful staging" by Goold and the overall production which he called "undeniably chilling" but citing the production less favorably to the 2012 film writing, "[while] this production make rigorous viewing, I miss the sense of quotidian reality that gave the movie much of its power." Time Out criticized its direction by Goold writing, "It feels like Goold's theatricality and the naturalistic, thriller-ish source material often work against each other." However they praised Devlin's set and Menzies' performance as standouts. Stephen Dalton of The Hollywood Reporter gave the production a mixed view writing, "It lacks some of the nuanced shadings of Vinterberg's screenplay, veering into shouty melodrama in places. Even so, Goold's superbly mounted production has punch, polish and contemporary resonance. It feels like a hit."

The New York transfer received generally positive reviews with Robert Hofler of TheWrap citing Menzies "impressive American stage debut" and comparing the play favorably to The Children's Hour and Oleanna. Allison Considine of New York Theater Guide praised Es Devlin's set writing, "The Hunt has a best-in-class production design... All the production elements work together seamlessly to offer an immersive, almost cinematic experience". Elisabeth Vincentelli of The New York Times gave a mixed review praising its technical aspects such as Devlin's scenic design as well as its sound and lighting design but criticized Rupert Goold's heavy handed direction. She wrote, "He is a rare director in the English-speaking world who can dream up and pull off highly conceptual, wildly theatrical spectacles...Here, the staging can feel redundant especially since it is burdened with foreshadowing and obvious symbolism".

== Accolades ==
=== 2024 Off-Broadway ===
Year	Award	Category	Nominated work	Result	Ref.
2024	Drama League Awards	Outstanding Production of a Play		Nominated	
2024	Drama League Awards	Distinguished Performance	Tobias Menzies	Nominated	
2024	Drama League Awards	Outstanding Direction of a Play	Rupert Goold	Nominated	
2024	Drama Desk Awards	Outstanding Lead Performance in a Play	Tobias Menzies	Nominated	
2024	Drama Desk Awards	Outstanding Adaptation	David Farr	Nominated	
2024	Drama Desk Awards	Outstanding Direction of a Play	Rupert Gold	Nominated	
2024	Drama Desk Awards	Outstanding Scenic Design of a Play	Es Devlin	Nominated	
2024	Drama Desk Awards	Outstanding Sound Design of a Play	Adam Clark	Nominated	
