= Forget Me Not (2010 British film) =

2010 British romantic drama film

- British quad format film poster
- Directed by: Alexander Holt; Lance Roehrig
- Written by: Howard Long; Mark Underwood
- Produced by: Rebecca Long
- Starring: Tobias Menzies; Genevieve O'Reilly
- Cinematography: Shane Daly
- Edited by: Kant Pan
- Music by: Michael J. McEvoy
- Production company: Quicksilver Films
- Distributed by: Kaleidoscope Home Entertainment (UK)
- Release dates: August 2010 (Rhode Island); 6 May 2011 (United Kingdom)
- Running time: 94 minutes
- Country: United Kingdom
- Language: English

Forget Me Not is a 2010 British romantic drama film, directed by Alexander Holt and Lance Roehrig and starring Tobias Menzies and Genevieve O'Reilly. It was first shown at the Rhode Island International Film Festival in August 2010, and was released in the US on 4 March 2011 and in the UK on 6 May 2011.

== Plot ==
Will Fletcher is a musician, and Eve Fisher works in a pub where he is performing, during one night in London. After Will saves Eve from a drunken customer at closing time, they stay up all night together, meandering through the streets of London and forging a relationship. Next morning, Eve takes him to see her Alzheimer's-suffering grandmother.

== Cast ==
- Tobias Menzies as Will Fletcher
- Genevieve O'Reilly as Eve Fisher
- Luke de Woolfson as Luke
- Charlie Covell as Carly
- Susie Harriet as Suze
- Gemma Jones as Lizzie Fisher
- Nigel Cooke as Jim

== Reception ==
On Rotten Tomatoes the film has an approval rating of 69% based on reviews from 13 critics. Dennis Harvey in Variety found the film "a pleasant if slender affair reminiscent of Before Sunrise, with a little Once tossed in", that "moves gracefully toward a conclusion that will trigger tears from some viewers, though others may find it a bit too heavy a tragic load for the film to bear." Tom Huddleston in Time Out, wrote that "A frequent criticism of ultra-low-budget independent movies is that they try to do too much. 'Forget Me Not' may even be guilty of doing too little – but what it does attempt, it largely pulls off" and concluded that "ambitious it ain't, but Forget Me Not is a modest, memorable and rather moving slice of DIY cinema." Patrick Smith in The Daily Telegraph compared the film to Richard Linklater's Before Sunrise and Before Sunset, but found that although it "isn't quite as accomplished", Menzies and O'Reilly "have enough chemistry for the climax to be surprisingly poignant." Roger Ebert concluded that the film resembles Linklater's films, but "moves along too deliberately", and although the ending "conceals an emotional impact, sad and carefully orchestrated...the film isn't very compelling."

== Awards ==
The film won Best UK Film and Best Editing at the 2015 London Independent Film Festival and the Golden Ace at the Las Vegas Film Festival.
