= Mayflies (TV series) =

British television series

- Based on: Mayflies by Andrew O'Hagan
- Screenplay by: Andrea Gibb
- Directed by: Peter Mackie Burns
- Starring: Martin Compston; Tony Curran; Ashley Jensen
- Original language: English
- No. of series: 1
- No. of episodes: 2

Production
- Executive producers: Andrea Gibb; Andrew O'Hagan; Claire Mundell; Adrian Burns; Mark Young; Gavin Smith; Gaynor Holmes
- Cinematography: Alasdair Boyce
- Production company: Synchronicity Films

Original release
- Network: BBC One
- Release: 27 December – 28 December 2022

Mayflies is a two-part British television drama series starring Martin Compston and Tony Curran, adapted by Andrea Gibb from Andrew O'Hagan's 2020 novel of the same name, and directed by Peter Mackie Burns.

== Synopsis ==
Tully and Jimmy have been friends since 1986 after meeting in Scotland. Thirty years later, Jimmy receives a phone call from Tully, asking him to come home so they can talk. When he gets there, Tully tells him that he has terminal cancer.

== Cast ==
- Martin Compston as Jimmy
  - Rian Gordon as Young Jimmy
- Tony Curran as Tully
  - Tom Glynn-Carney as Young Tully
- Ashley Jensen as Anna, Tully's wife
- Tracy Ifeachor as Iona, Jimmy's wife
- Paul Gorman as Young Hogg
- Matt Littleson as Limbo
- Cal MacAninch - Tibbs
  - Mitchell Robertson as Young Tibbs
- Elaine C Smith - Barbara
  - Charlene Boyd as young Barbara
- Shauna Macdonald - Fiona
- Colin McCredie - Scott

== Production ==
The BBC announced the project in August 2022. Set and filmed in Scotland, Synchronicity Films were announced to be producing for the BBC. Compston described the process of adapting an acclaimed novel "terrifying", while Curran said they had tried to "honour" the book.

== Broadcast ==
The first episode of Mayflies aired in the UK on BBC One on Wednesday 28 December 2022 at 9:00 pm, the second episode airing on the following day at the same time.

== Reception ==
The Financial Times called Mayflies a “thoughtful exploration of how death liberates the soon-to-be deceased, and devastates those left behind” with an “array of stirring performances”. The Guardian described it as “beautifully told” whilst “Curran is deeply moving as a man who refuses to let death have the last laugh, with Ashley Jensen as his firecracker wife Anna.”
