= Counsels (TV series) =

Upcoming British legal drama TV series

- Genre: Legal drama
- Written by: Bryan Elsley; Gillian McCormack; Maryam Hamidi; Jingan Young
- Starring: Brandon Grace; Ro Kumar; Eilidh Park; George Prentice; Alyth Ross; Rebecca Bell
- Country of origin: United Kingdom
- Original language: English

Production
- Executive producers: Bryan Elsley; Gillian McCormack; Gaynor Holmes; Gavin Smith; Daniel Donnelly
- Production company: Balloon Scotland

Original release
- Network: BBC One; BBC Scotland

Counsels is an upcoming British legal drama television series written by Bryan Elsley and Gillian McCormack. Set in Glasgow, it follows five young lawyers who trained together and now practise across the city. The eight-part series is due to be broadcast on BBC One and BBC Scotland in early 2027.

== Premise ==
The series follows five young lawyers in Glasgow who previously trained together and are now practising law across the city.

== Cast ==
=== Main ===
- Brandon Grace as Jamie
- Ro Kumar as Bav
- Eilidh Park as Nadine
- George Prentice as Alasdair
- Alyth Ross as Katie
- Rebecca Bell as Karina

=== Supporting ===
- Mitchell Robertson
- Michelle Gomez
- Derek Riddell
- Laura Haddock
- Daniela Nardini
- Michael Nardone
- Sally Howitt
- Stuart Bowman
- Neshla Caplan
- Stephen Purdon
- Mhairi Black

== Production ==
The eight-part series is written by Bryan Elsley and Gillian McCormack and was commissioned in March 2025. It is produced by Balloon Scotland. Co-writers are Maryam Hamidi and Jingan Young. Elsley and McCormack are also executive producers alongside Gaynor Holmes, Gavin Smith and Daniel Donnelly.

The cast is led by Brandon Grace, Ro Kumar, Eilidh Park, George Prentice, Alyth Ross and Rebecca Bell as the young lawyers, as well as established Scottish performers such as Daniela Nardini, Michelle Gomez, Derek Riddell and Stuart Bowman. In October 2025, Mhairi Black joined the cast in her first acting role, playing a detective.

Filming began in Glasgow in August 2025.

== Broadcast ==
The series will broadcast on BBC One and BBC Scotland in early 2027.
