= The Life and Opinions of Maf the Dog, and of His Friend Marilyn Monroe =

2010 book by Andrew O'Hagan

- Author: Andrew O'Hagan
- Language: English
- Publisher: Faber & Faber
- Publication date: 2010
- Publication place: UK

The Life and Opinions of Maf the Dog, and of His Friend Marilyn Monroe published by Faber & Faber, is a novel by Scottish novelist Andrew O'Hagan, about the life and philosophical observations of "Maf" (short for "Mafia Honey"), a Maltese dog given to Marilyn Monroe by Frank Sinatra.

== Reception ==
The novel won O'Hagan a Glenfiddich Spirit of Scotland Award.

John Banville compared it to The Great Gatsby and the oeuvre of Vladimir Nabokov. Peter Bogdanovich, who knew Monroe personally, lauded O'Hagan's portrayal of her, stating that the dialogue was "absolutely authentic".

National Public Radio found it "dazzling but occasionally wearying", with Maf's observations — explained as the result of dogs "absorb(ing) everything known to their owners", as well as "the thoughts of (everyone they) meet" — leading to "sometimes pretentious and convoluted but generally hilarious disquisitions" about a wide variety of subjects, but noted that "(n)ot all the philosophical ruminations work."

The Scotsman called it "good fooling, with a fair quota of intellectual crackle", and observed that "(r)eaders who can [follow] the references and allusions will share [O'Hagan's] enjoyment", but faulted his portrayal of Monroe, saying that it was "entirely conventional and doesn't offer a single surprise."

== Adaptation ==
In 2010, The Guardian mentioned that Angelina Jolie and George Clooney were being considered for parts in a film adaptation of the novel.
