= Curfew (2024 TV series) =

2024 British dystopian crime drama

- Genre: Crime drama
- Based on: After Dark/Curfew by Jayne Cowie
- Screenplay by: Lydia Yeoman; Jess Green; Sumerah Srivastav
- Directed by: Joasia Goldyn
- Starring: Sarah Parish; Mandip Gill; Mitchell Robertson; Lucy Benjamin; Larry Lamb; Alexandra Burke; Bobby Brazier; Anita Dobson
- Country of origin: United Kingdom
- Original language: English
- No. of series: 1
- No. of episodes: 6

Production
- Executive producers: Allan Niblo; Jane Moore; Nathalie Peter-Contesse
- Producer: John Adams
- Production companies: Evolutionary Films; Vertigo Films

Original release
- Network: Paramount+ UK & Ireland
- Release: 10 October 2024

Curfew is a British crime drama television series for Paramount+ UK & Ireland based on the novel After Dark (Note: Also published as Curfew, hence the series' title)by Jayne Cowie.

== Premise ==
Set in a society where men are restricted by a curfew from 7 p.m. to 7 a.m. to prioritise women's safety, the murder of a woman outside the Women's Safety Centre shocks the community. Veteran police officer Pamela Green (Sarah Parish) suspects that a man is responsible for the crime, despite the curfew - which requires all men to be tagged and monitored during restricted hours. Partnering with her new colleague Eddie (Mitchell Robertson), Pamela faces scepticism from both the public and her superiors, who believe the curfew system makes it impossible for a man to be involved. As the investigation unfolds, Pamela must confront her own biases and navigate political pressure while seeking the truth behind the murder.

== Cast ==
- Sarah Parish as DI Pamela Green
- Mandip Gill as Sarah
- Mitchell Robertson as Eddie
- Alexandra Burke as Helen Jones
- Tommy McDonnell as Greg
- Lucy Benjamin as DCI Sue Ferguson
- Anita Dobson as Janet
- Adam Korson as Ben Williams
- Amy Louise Pemberton as Sian Williams
- Imogen Sandhu as Cass
- Bobby Brazier as James
- James Craven as Max Williams
- Selorm Adonu as Billy
- Pearl D'souza as Sita
- Alisha Bailey as Aisha
- Mark Killeen as Steve
- Emily Ross as Pru
- Oliver Anvin-Wilson as Patrick
- Larry Lamb as Rhys Holden
- Raphael D’Alterio as Noah Williams
- Ciarán Owens as Tom Banley
- Phoebe Sparrow as Becki Sutton

== Production ==
The series was produced by Vertigo Films in association with Evolutionary Films, with Federation Studios distributing. John Adams is the producer, Joasia Goldyn is the director, whilst Lydia Yeoman is lead writer alongside Jess Green and Sumerah Srivastav. Allan Niblo, Jane Moore and Nathalie Peter-Contesse are executive producers on the series for Vertigo Films. It is an adaptation of the 2022 novel After Dark by Jayne Cowie. Filming was underway in early 2024 in London.

The cast is led by Sarah Parish and Mandip Gill and also includes Mitchell Robertson and Alexandra Burke. In April 2024, Anita Dobson, Lucy Benjamin, Bobby Brazier and Larry Lamb joined the cast.

== Release ==
The series premiered on 10 October 2024. It was subsequently broadcast on 5 (British TV channel) in February 2026.

=== Reception ===
Writing in the Guardian, Lucy Mangan gave the series three stars out of five, saying that it was "decent thriller fare" but its worldbuilding was "disappointingly sketchy" and left "far too many unanswered questions", including that of male violence committed during daytime hours or in a domestic setting.

The Daily Telegraph's Anita Singh gave the series two stars out of five, with much of the review being dedicated to what she saw as the series' issues with worldbuilding and thus with believability.

Ed Power of the Irish Times described the series as "a passable shoestring thriller hobbled by a lot of weird gender politics." Power queried the lack of any reference to daytime or domestic violence, and also noted the "superhuman levels of suspension of disbelief" needed to accept that all men were "such a danger to society that they have to be put under house arrest each sundown" while simultaneously "the patriarchy has apparently been subjugated to the point where legislators can force men to remain indoors". Ultimately, he found that it was "still refreshing to see a series use speculative fiction to explore issues around everyday misogyny" and the question of women's nighttime safety.

Reviewing the series for the i, Tilly Pearce gave the series three stars out of five, saying that it "seems somewhat aware of its faults and the barmy premise ends up working better than it should", but that while it had "huge potential to say something important about violence against women and girls [...], its determination to wedge in the male point of view whataboutery" meant that "any feminist notions are killed off".

Digital Spy's Jess Bacon said that while the series offered "some contrived reflections and generalisations on femicide, murder and women's safety", it also offered "some of the boldest statements about the epidemic of violence against women."
