= Sally Howitt =

Scottish actress

- Born: Oban, Argyll and Bute, Scotland
- Occupation: actress
- Years active: 1994–present

Sally Howitt is a Scottish actress. Howitt is best known for her portrayal of Scarlett O'Hara in the BBC Scotland soap opera River City, a role she played from 2003 until the final episode in 2026, becoming one of the show's longest serving cast members.

== Early life ==
Sally Howitt was born in Oban. She spent her childhood holidays in Islay.

== Career ==
Howitt has played Scarlett O'Hara in River City since 2003. She left in 2009 but returned in 2012.

She has also starred in Outlander, The Decoy Bride, a 2014 Children in Need crossover episode featuring the cast of River City and Still Game and The Tales of Para Handy.

In 2017, Howitt acted in the Kilmarnock Palace Panto. In 2024, Howitt starred in the comedy drama television series Dinosaur. She played the role of Diane.

In 2025, she starred in the legal drama Counsels.
