= Michele Austin =

British actress

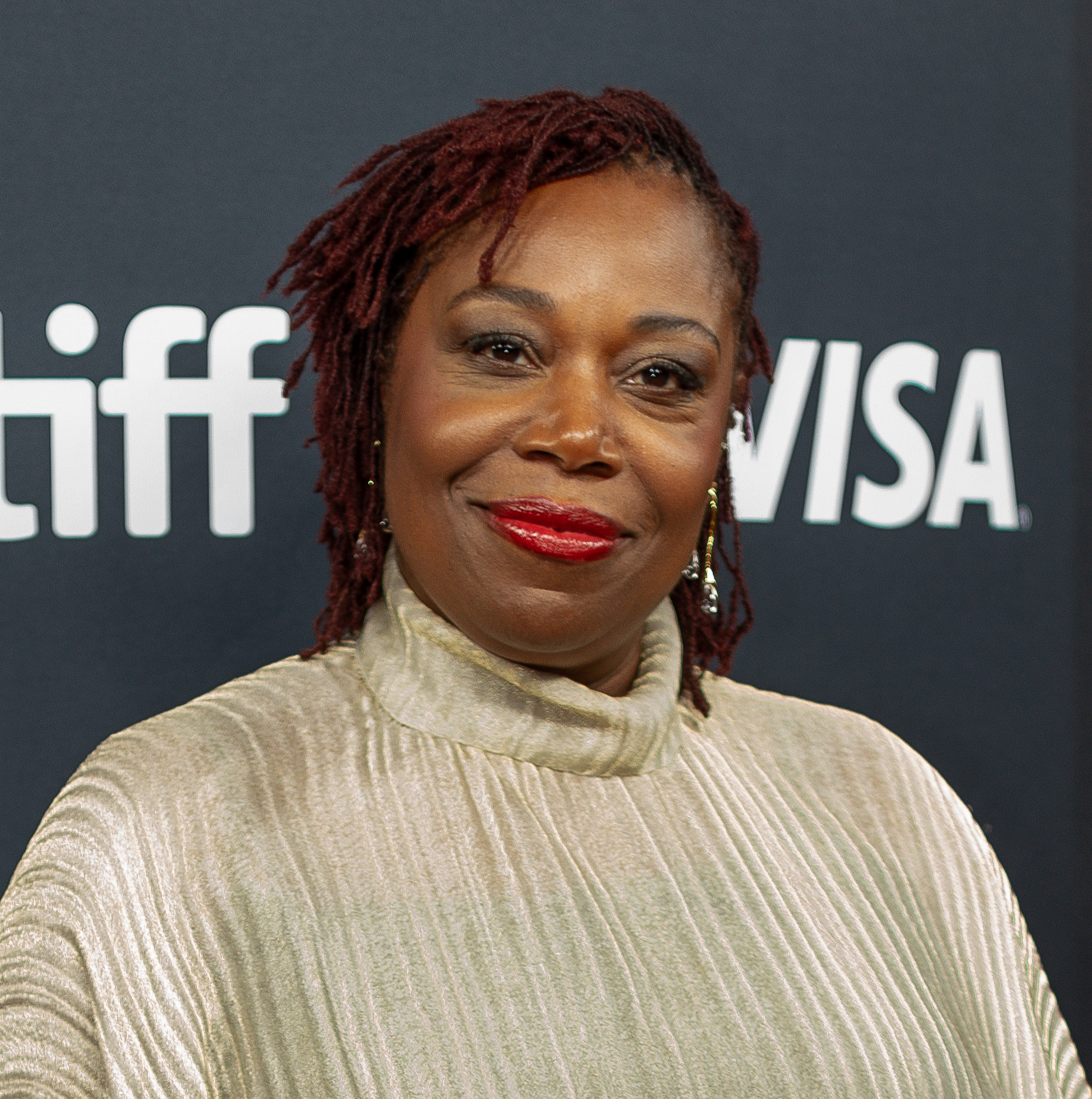
- Austin at the 2024 Toronto International Film Festival
- Education: Rose Bruford College
- Occupation: Actress
- Years active: 1996—present
- Known for: The Bill; Hard Truths

Michele Austin is a British actress. She best known for her role as Yvonne Hemmingway on ITV's The Bill, for which she won the Screen Nation Award for Best Television Actress, and for her portrayal of Chantelle in Hard Truths, for which she won the National Society of Film Critics award for Best Supporting Actress.

== Career ==
Austin studied acting at Rose Bruford College in Sidcup.

As well as her role as PC Hemmingway in the ITV series The Bill, she played the character Marsha Harris twice in 2001. Austin had roles in Mike Leigh's films Secrets & Lies (1996) and Another Year (2010). She also has a small role in ITV's 2008 teen drama Britannia High as Mrs Doris Troy, the landlady of the main characters, in the comedy Never Better and as a nurse in BBC's Outnumbered that aired on 30 August 2009.

In December 2010, Austin appeared in the British BBC soap opera EastEnders as Gloria MacDonald, a role which she reprised in February 2016. Prior to this she played Miss Meg Tyler in 1993. On 12 February 2013, she played the part of Estelle in an episode of Death in Paradise on BBC1.

In 2016, Austin appeared in the BBC series The Coroner. In 2020, she appeared in the British comedy TV series Meet the Richardsons. In 2022, she played senior midwife Tracy in the BBC screen adaptation of Adam Kay's book based on his experiences as a junior doctor, This Is Going to Hurt.

== Filmography ==
=== Film ===
Year	Title	Role	Notes
1996	Secrets & Lies	Dionne	
1999	Park Stories		Short film
2002	All or Nothing	Care Worker	
2010	The Infidel	Zadie	
2010	Another Year	Tanya	
2014	What We Did on Our Holiday	Lucy	
2015	Nipplejesus	Denise	Short film
2017	Birds Like Us	Jula	Voice role
2017	The Children Act	Donna	
2019	National Theatre Live: Cyrano de Bergerac	Ragueneau	
2024	Hard Truths	Chantelle	

=== Television ===
Year	Title	Role	Notes
1994	The Bill	Doctor	Episode: "All Along the Watchtower"
1997	The Perfect Blue	Frances	TV film
1998	Kiss Me Kate	Applicant	Episode: "Secretaries"
1998	Babes in the Wood	Doctor	Episode: "Series 1, Episode 5"
1998	Comedy Lab	Mai Judith/Joyce Ntindi	Episode: "Homie & Away"
2001	Gimme Gimme Gimme	Priest	Episode: "Secrets and Flies"
2001	The Bill	Marsha Harris	Episodes: "Family Honour" & "Words of Wisdom"
2001	EastEnders	Registrar	1 episode
2002	Casualty	Rhea Yates	Episode: "Life Incognito"
2002	Night and Day	Receptionist	Episode: "Haunted"
2002	Always and Everyone	Poppy Jonston	Series 4 regular, 8 episodes
2002	Doctors	Laura Brown	Episode: "Testing Testing"
2003	Canterbury Tales	Trish	Episode: "The Wife of Bath"
2003	Second Nature	Nurse	TV film
2003–05	The Last Detective	WPC Cheryl	Recurring role, 9 episodes
2003–06	The Bill	PC Yvonne Hemmingway	Series regular, 157 episodes
2007	Secret Life	Probation Officer	TV film
2008	Never Better	Linda	Series regular, 5 episodes
2008	Britannia High	Mrs. Troy	Recurring role, 5 episodes
2008–10	Outnumbered	Nurse	Episodes: "The Long Night" & "The Hospital"
2010	Peep Show	Midwife	Episode: "St Hospitals"
2010–16	EastEnders	Gloria MacDonald	Recurring role, 3 episodes
2011	Silent Witness	Cherie Maskell	Episode: "A Guilty Mind"
2011	Holby City	Suzanna Stables	Episode: "Shame"
2013	Death in Paradise	Estelle Du Bois	Episode: "A Dash of Sunshine"
2015	The Casual Vacancy	Kaye Bawden	Mini-series, 3 episodes
2016	The Coroner	Maggie Fordham-Bryce	Episode: "Life"
2018	Doctors	Monica Perry	Episode: "Unchained"
2018	Dark Heart	Annie Webb	Recurring role, 4 episodes
2020–22	Meet the Richardsons	Dani Julian	Series regular, 20 episodes
2021	The Dumping Ground	Alice	Episode: "Nobody's Perfect"
2022	This Is Going to Hurt	Tracy	Series regular, 7 episodes
2022	The Other One	Angela	Series 2 regular
2023	Boat Story	Camilla Wells	6 episodes
2025	Black Mirror	Jen Minter	Episode: "Plaything"

=== Stage ===
Year	Title	Roles	Notes
2019	The Hunt	Hilde	Almeida Theatre
2023	The Effect	Dr. Lorna James	Lyttelton Theatre
2024	The Effect	Dr. Lorna James	The Shed
