= David Farr =

David Farr may refer to:

- David Farr (businessman), American businessman
- David Farr (theatre director), British writer and director
