= Genevieve O'Reilly =

Irish actress (born 1977)

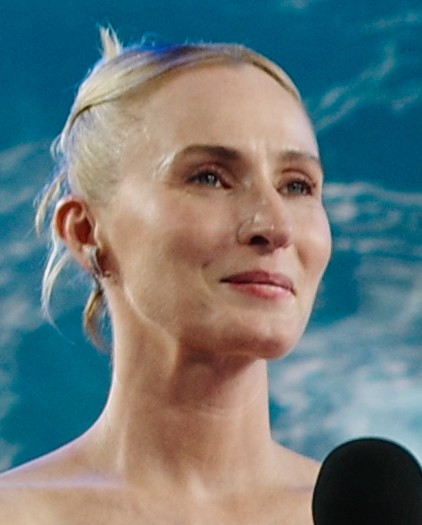
- O'Reilly at Star Wars Celebration Japan 2025
- Born: 6 January 1977 (age 49); Dublin, Ireland
- Education: National Institute of Dramatic Art (BFA)
- Occupation: Actress
- Years active: 2000–present
- Spouse: Luke Mulvihill
- Children: 2

Genevieve O'Reilly (born 6 January 1977) is an Irish actress. She is known for portraying Mon Mothma in the Star Wars franchise beginning with Revenge of the Sith (2005), a role which earned her two Saturn Award nominations for Best Supporting Actress for her performance in Andor. She has also amassed significant other acting credits on stage and in film and television.

== Early life and education ==
Genevieve O'Reilly was born on 6 January 1977 in Dublin, Ireland, and at age ten emigrated to Adelaide, in South Australia. She had two younger siblings when the family emigrated, eventually gaining Australian citizenship.

O'Reilly moved to Sydney to attend the National Institute of Dramatic Art, eventually being accepted after three attempts. She graduated in 2000.

== Career ==
=== Theatre ===
O'Reilly was cast as the understudy in director Gale Edwards' production of The White Devil a week after graduating from drama school. She went on to appear in Edwards' Sydney Theatre Company production of The Way of the World. Other theatre credits include The Weir by Conor McPherson, at the Gate Theatre, Dublin, and Richard II at the Old Vic. Her recent parts at the Royal National Theatre have been in new play, Mike Bartlett's 13, and as Helena, wife to Andrew Scott's emperor Julian in the 2011 production of Ibsen's epic Emperor and Galilean.

In July 2012, O'Reilly performed in George Bernard Shaw's The Doctor's Dilemma. In 2015 O'Reilly played Kathryn in Splendour by Abi Morgan at the Donmar Warehouse. In 2017, she played Mary Carney in The Ferryman, first at the Royal Court Theatre and later at the Gielgud Theatre in the West End of London.

=== Film ===
O'Reilly has appeared in several productions filmed in Australia, including Matrix franchise sequels, The Matrix Reloaded (2003), and The Matrix Revolutions (2003). She also starred in the 2004 Singaporean science fiction film Avatar, which also was marketed under the title Cyber Wars (2006), where she played the lead role of Dash MacKenzie.

==== Star Wars ====
In 2005, O'Reilly played the young Mon Mothma in Star Wars: Episode III – Revenge of the Sith; although most of her scenes were cut, they were included as bonus material for the 2005 DVD release. In 2016, she reprised her role as Mon Mothma in Rogue One: A Star Wars Story and voiced the same character in the animated TV show Star Wars Rebels in early 2017. O'Reilly continued her role as Mon Mothma in the first season of the series Andor, that premiered in September 2022. She returned to the role in the Disney+ series Ahsoka in 2023 and then in the second season of Andor in 2025.

=== Television ===
In television, O'Reilly's first appearance was in 2001 in the Canadian television series BeastMaster as a guest star in "Slayer's Return". The following year O'Reilly appeared in Young Lions as Kimberly Oswald in the episode "Asylum Seekers". O'Reilly then appeared as a prominent character in All Saints from 2002 to 2005 as Leanne Curtis.{ Since moving to the UK, O'Reilly starred in the political mini-series The State Within, (first episode 2 November 2006) played Princess Diana in the 2007 television docudrama Diana: Last Days of a Princess, and had the lead role in The Time of Your Life (summer 2007). In 2009, she played CIA liaison officer Sarah Caulfield in the eighth series of BBC drama Spooks. She played Julie Rees in Harbinger, the two-part, season 9-opening episodes of Waking the Dead. O'Reilly also played the character of Michelle Beadley in the remake of The Day of the Triffids that aired on BBC One in December 2009.

From 2011 to 2014, O'Reilly appeared in the series Episodes as a recurring character alongside Matt LeBlanc. In June 2013, O'Reilly appeared in the pilot episode of the international crime drama Crossing Lines cast as detective and interrogation specialist Sienna Pride, attached to the ICC team from Britain's Scotland Yard. Later in 2014, O'Reilly appeared in the television mini series The Honourable Woman as Frances Pirsig. In 2015, O'Reilly appeared in the BBC television series Banished as Mary Johnson.

In early 2015, O'Reilly starred as Mary Johnson in Jimmy McGovern's Banished, a television drama focusing on British convicts in an Australian penal colony. In 2015, O'Reilly also starred as Dr Elishia McKellar, in an Australian paranormal drama Glitch. In 2016, O'Reilly appeared in the British drama The Secret, for which she gained acclaim and was reported to play her character "beautifully".

In 2017, she was cast alongside Tim Roth as Angela Worth, in the British TV Series Tin Star

== Personal life ==
In 2005, O'Reilly moved to London with her husband, Luke Mulvihill, intending to stay for a couple of years, but were still living there in 2020. They have two children, a son and a daughter.

== Filmography ==
=== Film ===
Year	Title	Role	Notes	Ref.
2003	The Matrix Reloaded	Officer Wirtz		
2003	The Matrix Revolutions	Officer Wirtz		
2004	Avatar (also released as Cyber Wars in 2006)	Dash MacKenzie		
2004	Right Here Right Now	Pizza Girl		
2005	Star Wars: Episode III – Revenge of the Sith	Mon Mothma	Deleted scenes	
2009	The Young Victoria	Lady Flora Hastings		
2010	Forget Me Not	Eve Fisher		
2015	Survivor	Lisa Carr		
2016	The Legend of Tarzan	Alice Clayton, Countess Greystoke		
2016	Rogue One: A Star Wars Story	Mon Mothma		
2017	The Snowman	Birte Becker		
2019	The Kid Who Would Be King	Sophie		
2019	Tolkien	Mrs. Smith		
2021	The Dry	Gretchen		

=== Television ===
Year	Title	Role	Notes	Ref.
2001	BeastMaster	Nagha	Episode: "Slayer's Return"	
2002	Young Lions	Kimberly Oswald	Episode: "Asylum Seekers"	
2002–2005	All Saints	Leanne Curtis	Recurring role	
2005	The Incredible Journey of Mary Bryant	Alicia	TV miniseries	
2005	Second Chance	Susie Fulham	Television film	
2005	Life	Shelly Deane	Television film	
2006	The State Within	Caroline Hanley	Main role	
2007	The Time of Your Life	Kate	Main role	
2007	Diana: Last Days of a Princess	Diana, Princess of Wales	TV docudrama	
2009	Spooks	Sarah Caulfield	Recurring role	
2009	The Day of the Triffids	Michelle Beadley	Episode: "Part 1"	
2010	New Tricks	Miranda Armstrong	Episode: "The Fourth Man"	
2010	Law & Order: UK	Claudia Martin	Episode: "Skeletons"	
2011	Waking the Dead	Julie Rees	Episode: "Harbinger: Parts 1 & 2"	
2011–2014	Episodes	Jamie Lapidus	Recurring role	
2012	Midsomer Murders	Nina Morgan	Episode: "A Rare Bird"	
2012	The Last Weekend	Daisy	TV miniseries	
2013	Crossing Lines	Sienna Pride	Episode: "Pilot: Parts 1 & 2"	
2014	The Honourable Woman	Frances Pirsig	TV miniseries	
2015	Banished	Mary Johnson	TV miniseries	
2015–2019	Glitch	Dr. Elishia McKellar	Main role	
2016	Endeavour	Annette Richardson	Episode: "Arcadia"	
2016	The Secret	Hazel Buchanan / Hazel Stewart	TV miniseries	
2016	The Fall	Joan Kinkead	Episode: "His Troubled Thoughts"	
2017	Star Wars Rebels	Mon Mothma	Voice; 5 episodes	
2017–2020	Tin Star	Angela Worth	25 episodes	
2021	Three Families	Rosie Fortress	Two-part BBC drama	
2022–2025	Andor	Mon Mothma	17 episodes Nominated—Astra TV Award for Best Supporting Actress in a Streaming Drama Series; Nominated—Saturn Award for Best Supporting Actress on Television	
2023	Ahsoka	Mon Mothma	3 episodes	
2026	My Brilliant Career	Helen		

=== Video games ===
Year	Title	Role	Notes	Refs.
2017	Overwatch	Moira		
2022	Overwatch 2	Moira		
