= David Farr (theatre director) =

British playwright and theatre director

David Farr FRSL
- Born: 29 October 1969 (age 56); Guildford, Surrey, England
- Occupations: Theatre director and writer

David Farr (born 29 October 1969) is a British writer, theatrical director and Associate Director of the Royal Shakespeare Company.

== Background ==
Farr was brought up in Surrey and educated at St Hilary's School, Godalming, and Royal Grammar School, Guildford and the University of Cambridge (English Literature double first).

== Career ==
Farr began directing theatre at University and won the Guardian Student Drama Award at the Edinburgh Fringe Festival in 1991 with Slight Possession starring Rachel Weisz. His professional directorial debut came at The Gate Theatre, Notting Hill in 1995 (aged 25) under Stephen Daldry. He was also Artistic Director of Bristol Old Vic from 2002 to 2005 and Lyric Hammersmith from 2005 to 2009. In 2009, he joined the Royal Shakespeare Company as Associate Director.

He wrote regularly for Spooks for the BBC and is a film writer having co-written the Joe Wright film Hanna, released in 2011. Farr's adaptation of John le Carré's novel The Night Manager was aired in 2016 on BBC One. His first novel, The Book of Stolen Dreams, was published by Usborne in 2021.

Farr was elected a Fellow of the Royal Society of Literature (FRSL) in 2025.

In September 2025, Farr signed an open pledge with Film Workers for Palestine pledging not to work with Israeli film institutions "that are implicated in genocide and apartheid against the Palestinian people."

== Works ==
=== Professional productions ===
- The Great Highway, by August Strindberg (The Gate Theatre 1993)
- The Boat Plays (The Gate Theatre 1994)
- Powder Her Face, by Thomas Ades (Almeida Opera 1995)
- The Nativity, by David Farr (Young Vic 2000)
- Coriolanus, by William Shakespeare (RSC and London Old Vic winner critics circle, best lead actor Greg Hicks 2003)
- A Midsummer Night's Dream (Bristol Old Vic, winner best director TMS Awards 2002)
- The Odyssey (Bristol Old Vic 2004)
- The UN Inspector, by Gogol, adapted by David Farr starring Michael Sheen (National Theatre 2005)
- Tamburlaine, by Christopher Marlowe (The Barbican Centre, London)
- Julius Caesar, by William Shakespeare (RSC and Lyric Hammersmith 2005)
- Twelfth Night, by William Shakespeare (Royal Shakespeare Company 2012)
- Metamorphosis, by Franz Kafka, music by Nick Cave and Warren Ellis (Lyric Hammersmith 2006)
- The Birthday Party, by Harold Pinter (50th anniversary production, Lyric Hammersmith 2008)
- Water, a collaboration with Filter Theatre (Lyric Hammersmith 2007)
- Spyski, a collaboration with Peepolyskus (Lyric Hammersmith 2008)
- The Winter's Tale, by William Shakespeare (RSC 2010)
- King Lear, by William Shakespeare (RSC 2010)

=== Playwriting ===
- Elton John's Glasses (Watford Palace Theatre and West End, 1996).
- The Danny Crowe Show (Bush Theatre, 2002).
- Crime and Punishment in Dalston (Arcola Theatre, 2002 and 2003).
- The Queen Must Die (National Theatre, 2003).
- Ruckus in the Garden (National Theatre, 2007).
- Night of the Soul (Royal Shakespeare Company, 2002).
- The UN Inspector (adaptation from Gogol 2006) Faber 2005 and bilingual edition (French/English). Presses Universitaires du Mirail (2008).
- Metamorphosis (adaptation from Kafka 2006).
- The Heart of Robin Hood (Royal Shakespeare Company 2011/12 season).
- The Hunt (Almeida Theatre, 2019).
- A Dead Body in Taos (Fuel, Theatre Royal Plymouth, Warwick Arts Centre, Bristol Old Vic, 2022)

=== Screenwriting ===
- Spooks (series 4–9)
- Hanna (2011)
- Outcasts (2011)
- The Ones Below (2016)
- The Night Manager (2016, 2025–present)
- The Man with the Iron Heart (2016)
- Philip K. Dick’s Electric Dreams (2017)
- McMafia (2018)
- Troy: Fall of a City (2018)
- Hanna (2019–2021)
- The Midwich Cuckoos (2022)

=== Publications ===
- Plays 1, Faber and Faber (2005). (with cover artwork painting by Andrew Litten).
- The UN Inspector, Faber and Faber (2005).
- Reamayana, Faber and Faber (2007).
- The Heart of Robin Hood, Faber and Faber (2011).
