= Andrew O'Hagan =

Scottish author (born 1968)

Andrew O'Hagan FRSL, FRSE
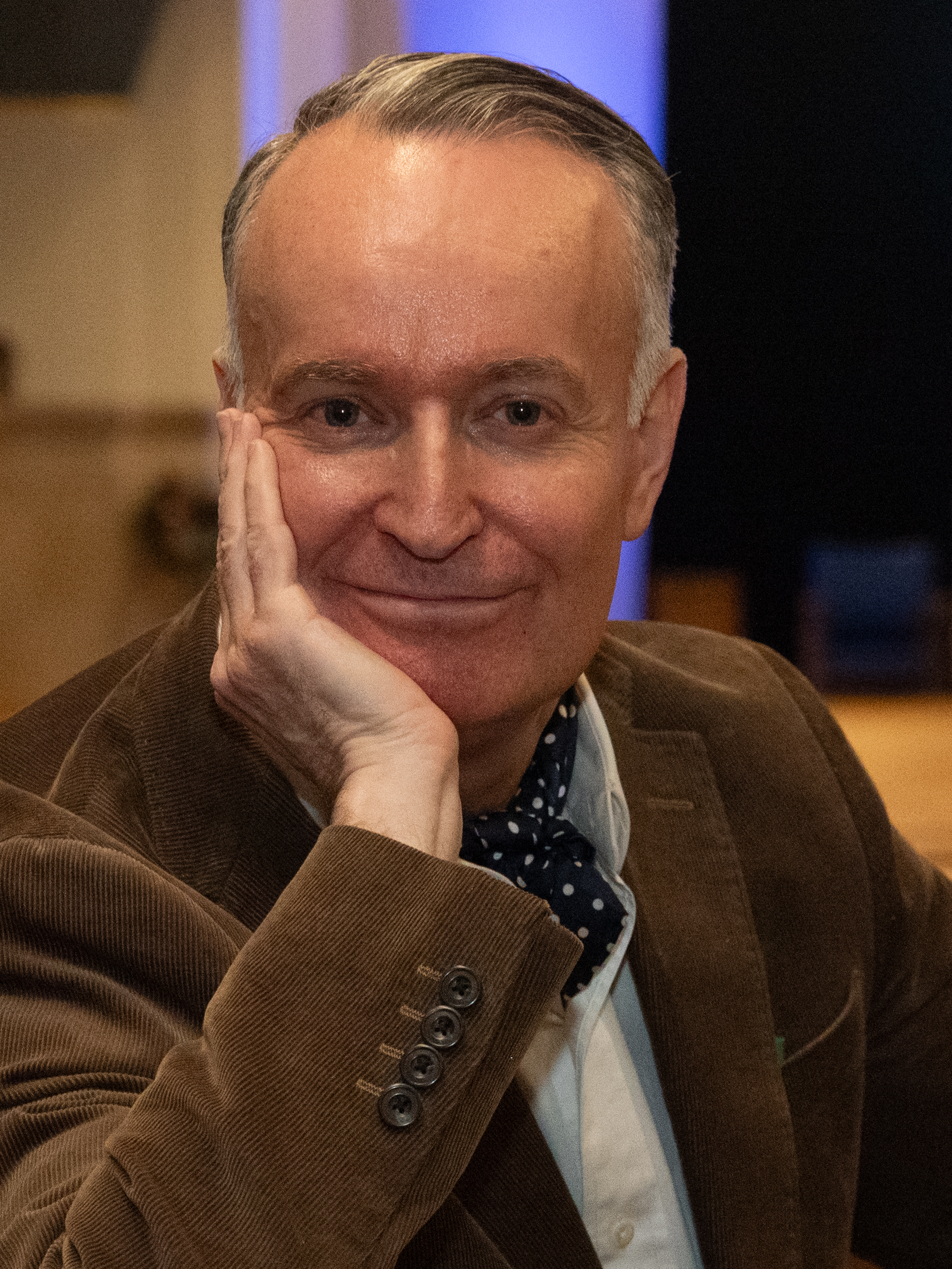
- O'Hagan in 2024
- Born: 1968 (age 57–58); Glasgow, Scotland
- Education: University of Strathclyde
- Occupations: Novelist, essayist
- Writing career
- Genres: Fiction, non-fiction, essay, play
- Website: andrewohagan.com

Andrew O'Hagan (born 1968) is a Scottish novelist and non-fiction author. Three of his novels have been nominated for the Booker Prize and he has won several awards, including the Los Angeles Times Book Prize.

His most recent novel as of 2024 is Caledonian Road (2024) published by Faber & Faber. His previous novel Mayflies (2020) won the Christopher Isherwood Prize, and was adapted into a two-part BBC television drama of the same name. O'Hagan was executive producer of the TV adaptation.

== Early life and education ==
Andrew O'Hagan was born in Glasgow in 1968, of Irish Catholic descent, and grew up in Kilwinning, North Ayrshire. His mother was a school cleaner, his father worked as a joiner in Paisley, and he had four elder brothers. His father was a violent alcoholic, and as a boy, he would hide books from his father under his bed.

He attended St Winning's Primary, then St Michael's Academy, before studying at the University of Strathclyde, the first in his family to reach tertiary education. He earned his BA (Honours) in English in 1990.

== Writing career ==
In 1991, O'Hagan joined the staff of the London Review of Books, where he worked for four years.

In 1995, he published his first book, The Missing, which drew from his own childhood and explored the lives of people who have gone missing in Britain and the families left behind. The Missing was shortlisted for three literary awards: the Esquire Award, the Saltire Society Scottish First Book of the Year Award, and the McVities Prize for Scottish Writer of the Year award.

In 1999, O'Hagan's debut novel, Our Fathers was nominated for several awards, including the Booker Prize, the Whitbread First Novel Award and the International Dublin Literary Award. It won the Winifred Holtby Memorial Prize.

In 2003, his next novel Personality, which features a character similar to Lena Zavaroni, won the James Tait Black Memorial Prize for fiction. That same year, O'Hagan won the E. M. Forster Award from the American Academy of Arts and Letters.

In 2006, his third novel, Be Near Me, was published by Faber & Faber and longlisted for that year's Man Booker Prize. It went on to win the 2007 Los Angeles Times Book Prize for Fiction. In 2008, he edited a new selection of Robert Burns's poems for Canongate Books, published as A Night Out with Robert Burns. A copy was lodged in every secondary school in Scotland. Following on from this, he wrote and presented a three-part film on Burns for the BBC, The World According to Robert Burns, first on 5 January 2009. In January 2011, Scotland on Sunday gave away 80,000 copies of the book. Also in 2008, Faber & Faber published O'Hagan's first non-fiction collection, The Atlantic Ocean: Essays on Britain and America, which was shortlisted for the 2008 Saltire Book of the Year Award.

O'Hagan's 2010 novel, The Life and Opinions of Maf the Dog, and of His Friend Marilyn Monroe, is told in the voice of a Scottish Maltese poodle ("Maf"), the name of the real dog given by Frank Sinatra to Marilyn Monroe in 1960. It was published by Faber & Faber in May 2010 and won O'Hagan a Glenfiddich Spirit of Scotland Award.

In 2012, O'Hagan worked on a theatrical production about the crisis in British newspapers, entitled Enquirer, with the National Theatre of Scotland.

In March 2014, O'Hagan wrote about his experience as a ghost-writer for Julian Assange's autobiography (published by Canongate and Alfred A. Knopf). His essay, entitled "Ghosting", published in the London Review of Books, gained significant media attention because of his description of Assange's character and strained relationships with past and present colleagues.

In 2015, O'Hagan published his fifth novel The Illuminations: A Novel, which was longlisted for the 2015 Man Booker Prize.

In June 2016, the London Review of Books published a 35,612-word essay by O'Hagan, titled "The Satoshi Affair: Andrew O'Hagan on the many lives of Satoshi Nakamoto", which followed the events surrounding programmer Craig Wright's claim to be bitcoin founder, Satoshi Nakomoto. In the article, O'Hagan describes how he was approached by Wright and nTrust, a group that he was associated with, in order to cover the exposure of Craig Wright's identity as Satoshi. Though the article is inconclusive as to the true identity of Satoshi, some have taken it as evidence that Wright is a fraud.

In October 2017, O'Hagan published The Secret Life: Three True Stories of the Digital Age which includes stories about his attempt to help Julian Assange write his memoirs, the author using the identity of a deceased man to make a new life on the Internet, and expanding on Craig Wright's claim to be Satoshi Nakamoto.

In September 2020, O'Hagan published his sixth novel, Mayflies.

His essays, reports and stories have appeared in the London Review of Books, The New York Review of Books, Granta, The Guardian and The New Yorker.

== Adaptations ==
Four of O'Hagan's books have been adapted into different media. In 1996, Channel 4 Television presented Calling Bible John: Portrait of a Serial Killer, nominated for a BAFTA award. In 2009, his novel Be Near Me was adapted by Ian McDiarmid for the Donmar Warehouse and the National Theatre of Scotland.

In September 2011, the National Theatre of Scotland presented The Missing as a play adapted by O'Hagan and directed by John Tiffany at Tramway, Glasgow. The play received favourable reviews. The Daily Telegraph called it "a profound act of mourning and memory." The Guardian called the work "an arresting, genre-defying work – part speculative memoir, part Orwellian social reportage" that "induces the kind of shock he [the author] must have experienced..."

In December 2022 BBC One aired an adaptation of Mayflies starring Martin Compston, Tony Curran, and Ashley Jensen.

== Other activities ==
In 2001, O'Hagan was named as a Goodwill Ambassador by the UK branch of UNICEF, and he has been involved in fundraising efforts for the organisation. He has travelled to Sudan, India, Malawi and Mozambique and has joined fellow ambassadors Ewan McGregor, Ralph Fiennes, James Nesbitt, Martin Bell and Jemima Khan in campaigning for Unicef.

In 2014, O'Hagan visited the site of the Battle of Loos , where he read aloud Charles Hamilton Sorley's poem "When you see millions of the mouthless dead"/ O'Hagan stated that Sorley's poem was "the great poem of the First World War"

In August 2017, O'Hagan gave a speech at the Edinburgh International Book Festival, where he declared that he had become a supporter of Scottish independence.

As of September 2011, O'Hagan has been a visiting professor of creative writing at King's College London.

In June 2023, The Age reported that the FBI was seeking to gather new evidence in the Julian Assange case, based on a request from the FBI to interview O'Hagan. O'Hagan refused the request, and said to the newspaper that "I would not give a witness statement against a fellow journalist being pursued for telling the truth. I would happily go to jail before agreeing in any way to support the American security establishment in this cynical effort."

In June 2024, O'Hagan became an ambassador for Bookbanks, a new charity that brings books to food banks in the UK. He has been involved in fundraising efforts for the charity and gave the inaugural talk for the charity's Matthew's Talks series of events in food banks.

== Personal life ==
O'Hagan has a daughter, whose mother is fellow author India Knight.

== Recognition, awards and honours ==
O'Hagan was selected by the literary magazine Granta for inclusion in their 2003 list of the top 20 young British novelists, and his novels have been translated into 15 languages.

=== Book awards ===
| Year | Work | Award | Category | Result | Ref |
|---|---|---|---|---|---|
| 1995 | The Missing | Esquire Award | — | Shortlisted | |
| 1995 | The Missing | McVitie's Prize for Scottish Writer of the Year | — | Shortlisted | |
| 1995 | The Missing | Saltire Society Literary Awards | First Book of the Year | Shortlisted | |
| 1999 | Our Fathers | Booker Prize | — | Shortlisted | |
| 1999 | Our Fathers | Whitbread Award | First Novel | Shortlisted | |
| 2000 | Our Fathers | Winifred Holtby Memorial Prize | — | Won | |
| 2001 | Our Fathers | International Dublin Literary Award | — | Shortlisted | |
| 2003 | Personality | James Tait Black Memorial Prize | Fiction | Won | |
| 2003 | — | E. M. Forster Award | — | Won | |
| 2006 | Be Near Me | Man Booker Prize | — | Longlisted | |
| 2007 | Be Near Me | Los Angeles Times Book Prize | Fiction | Won | |
| 2010 | — | Glenfiddich Spirit of Scotland Award | Writing | Won | |
| 2015 | The Illuminations | Man Booker Prize | — | Longlisted | |
| 2020 | Mayflies | Los Angeles Times Book Prize | Christopher Isherwood Prize | Won | |
| 2024 | Caledonian Road | Orwell Prize for Political Fiction | — | Shortlisted | |
| 2025 | Caledonian Road | International Dublin Literary Award | | Longlisted | |

=== Media awards ===
- 1996 – BAFTA, Calling Bible John (TV series, winner)

=== Other honours and appointments ===
- Trustee of George Orwell Trust
- Patron of Scottish Book Trust
- 2008: Honorary Doctor of Letters, University of Strathclyde
- 2008: Joined Robert Burns Humanitarian Award judging panel
- 2009: Honorary lifetime member of Irvine Burns Club
- 2010: Fellow of the Royal Society of Literature
- 2019: Named chief judge of Scottish Arts Trust Story Awards, succeeding Alexander McCall Smith in that role, on 6 December 2019

== Selected works ==
=== Fiction books ===
- Our Fathers (1999)
- Personality (2003)
- Be Near Me (2006)
- The Life and Opinions of Maf the Dog, and of His Friend Marilyn Monroe (2010)
- The Illuminations (2015)
- Mayflies (2020)
- Caledonian Road (2024)

=== Non-fiction books ===
- The Missing (1995)
- The Atlantic Ocean: Essays on Britain and America (2008)
- The Secret Life: Three True Stories of the Digital Age (2017)

=== Other writings ===
- As a ghostwriter:
  - Julian Assange: The Unauthorised Autobiography (2011; credited to Assange). Edinburgh: Canongate Books. ISBN 978-0-85786-384-3.
- Editing:
  - New Writing 11, 2002
  - The Weekenders: Adventures in Calcutta, 2004
  - A Night Out with Robert Burns, 2008
- Book Reviews:
  - "Racing against reality" The New York Review of Books 54/11 (28 June 2007): 4–8 [review of Don DeLillo, Falling Man]
  - "Run" Publishers Weekly Fiction Reviews: Week of 16 July 2007. Review of Run by Ann Patchett.
- The Satoshi Affair: Andrew O’Hagan on the many lives of Satoshi Nakamoto (2016, non-fiction)
- "Ghosting" London Review of Books, 6 March 2014
- The Tower, a 60,000-word essay about the Grenfell Tower fire in The London Review of Books
