= Divian Ladwa =

English actor

- Occupation: Actor
- Years active: 2007–present

Divian Ladwa is an English actor best known for appearing in the Oscar-nominated Lion, the BAFTA-winning comedy series Detectorists, and the Marvel Studios film Ant-Man and the Wasp.

== Career ==
=== TV and film ===
Divian Ladwa's film debut came in a micro-budget feature Saxon, in which he played a hot-headed Rahim Begum alongside Sean Harris. The film won Best European Drama at the ECU European Independent Film Festival and was nominated for the Michael Powell Award for Best Film at the Edinburgh International Film Festival.

His next role was shy and awkward Dev King in the British feature film 8 Minutes Idle. The twisted rom-com was nominated for Best Film at the Royal Television Society Awards and features Tom Hughes, Ophelia Lovibond, Antonia Thomas, Montserrat Lombard and Jack Ashton.

Ladwa is known for playing the sweet and innocent Hugh in the BAFTA-winning comedy series Detectorists written and directed by Mackenzie Crook. Originally aired on BBC Four, the show won critical praise and won two BAFTAs.

In 2017, Ladwa received attention for playing a psychologically traumatised character in the Oscar-nominated Lion. The film starred Nicole Kidman and David Wenham as his adoptive parents and Dev Patel as his adoptive brother. The double BAFTA-winning film, which also starred Rooney Mara, was nominated for four Golden Globes and six Academy Awards including Best Picture. Critics praised Ladwa's performance, with Cinapse writing "Lion is aided greatly by the likes of Divian Ladwa who is positively heartbreaking". Stuff wrote "Ladwa is excellent as the wayward brother" and Entertainment.ie said "Ladwa gives a fascinating portrayal of the adopted brother." Along with Dev Patel and David Wenham, Ladwa was included in the film's submission to the Screen Actors Guild Awards for their Best Supporting Actor category.

In 2018, he appeared in Ant-Man and the Wasp as Uzman, the right-hand man of antagonist Sonny Burch.

Later that year ITV announced Ladwa's involvement as a series regular in their upcoming police drama Wild Bill, playing opposite Rob Lowe, Rachael Stirling, Angela Griffin and Bronwyn James.

In 2019, Ladwa appeared in the British dark comedy series The End of the F***ing World as Sid, a talkative cop. He made a special guest appearance in episode 7 of the second series. The series premiered on Channel 4 in the UK and internationally the following day on Netflix. Netflix submitted Ladwa for consideration for the Primetime Emmy Awards as Outstanding Guest Actor in a Comedy Series category for his portrayal of Sid.

2019 saw the online release of period drama Mr Malcolm's List on the Refinery29 website, with Ladwa playing Gemma Chan and Frieda Pinto's footman John in a highly comical role. The film is part of Refinery29's Shatterbox series aiding and encouraging more female filmmakers. Following the success of the short, Mr Malcolm's List was made into a feature with Ladwa reprising his role as John. The film was released in 2022 to positive reviews and received a nomination for Best Independent Motion Picture by the NAACP Image Awards. The Hollywood Reporter and the Associated Press highlighted Ladwa's "amusing" performance with one review stating "Divian Ladwa from Lion steals any scene he's in".

In 2020, Ladwa played Dr Chillip in Armando Iannucci's adaptation of Charles Dickens The Personal History of David Copperfield, which also stars Hugh Laurie and Tilda Swinton and reunites Ladwa onscreen with Dev Patel.

2026 saw the release of Spider Island, a British comedy horror, where Ladwa plays Mongoose. Directed by Christopher Smith and produced by Vertigo Films it has an ensemble cast featuring Rose Williams, Tim McInnerny and Andy Nyman Spider Island premiered at FrightFest in London’s Leicester Square.

The Hollywood Reporter announced the involvement of Divian Ladwa in series 2 of Murderbot, an American science fiction action comedy television series created by Paul Weitz and Chris Weitz for Apple TV.

=== Stage ===
Away from TV and film, Ladwa has an extensive theatre background, working with a wide range of companies including Theatre Royal Stratford East, Tamasha Theatre Company and Fluxx Improvised Theatre, early in his career.

=== Radio ===
Ladwa has worked in numerous radio plays, mostly for BBC Radio 4, many of which have been recognised by various accolades. Six-part BBC drama The System, in which Ladwa plays Coyote, won the PRIX EUROPA for Best Fiction Series. Audible's Radioman, a ten-part audio drama series in which Ladwa appears as Manny, received a Rose D'or Award nomination for best drama. Ladwa has also played secondary-school student Charlie in School Drama and Romeo in Romeo and Juliet opposite Tom Hollander. He also played Vince the Mushroom Man in a continuation of Neil Gaiman's Neverwhere series, How The Marquis Got His Coat Back.

== Filmography ==
Television roles
Year	Title	Role	Notes
2014–2017, 2022	Detectorists	Hugh	Main cast
2015	You, Me and the Apocalypse	Jamie's Solicitor	Miniseries; Episode: "Who Are These People?"
2017	Jade Dragon	Richard	Main cast; Web series
2017–2018	In the Long Run	Hiten	
2018	Zapped	Mark	
2019	Wild Bill	PC Drakes	Main cast
2019	The End of the F***ing World	Sid	Special Guest Star
2019	The Tool	Rupesh	TV movie
2020	Avenue 5	Pete	
2020	Miracle Workers	Mr Shoemaker	
2021	Silent Witness	Leon Tovey	Series 24 Part 1 & 2
2021	Two Doors Down	Iqbal	
2022	The Baby	Fooze	
2022	Slow Horses	Simon Nair	Series 2
2024	A Gentleman in Moscow	Yaroslav	
2025	Black Ops	Mo	Series 2
2026	Father Brown		BBC
2026	Murderbot		Series 2

Film roles
Year	Title	Role	Notes
2007	Saxon	Rahim	Best Drama - ECU Festival
2012	8 Minutes Idle	Dev	BBC Films
2013	Frayed	Habbi	Short film
2013	Punchline	Tiny Tim	Short film
2014	My Dad	Voice	BAFTA nominee for animation
2016	Lion	Mantosh Brierley	Oscar nominee for Best Picture
2018	Ant-Man and the Wasp	Uzman	Marvel Studios
2019	Naptha	Faraz	Film4
2019	The Personal History of David Copperfield	Dr Chillip	BIFA nominee for Best Film
2022	Mr. Malcolm's List	John	NAACP nominee for Best Film
2024	And Mrs	Dr. Fasli	
2026	Man Baby	David	Lead
2026	Spider Island	Mongoose	Vertigo Films
