= Timmy Failure: Mistakes Were Made =

2020 film by Tom McCarthy

- Promotional poster
- Directed by: Tom McCarthy
- Screenplay by: Tom McCarthy; Benjamin Pestana; Stephan Pastis
- Based on: Timmy Failure by Stephan Pastis
- Produced by: Alexander Dostal; Tom McCarthy; Jim Whitaker
- Starring: Winslow Fegley; Ophelia Lovibond; Craig Robinson; Wallace Shawn
- Cinematography: Masanobu Takayanagi
- Edited by: Tom McArdle
- Music by: Rolfe Kent
- Production companies: Walt Disney Pictures; Etalon Film; Slow Pony Pictures; Whitaker Entertainment
- Distributed by: Disney+
- Release dates: January 25, 2020 (Sundance); February 7, 2020 (Disney+)
- Running time: 99 minutes
- Country: United States
- Language: English
- Budget: $42 million

Timmy Failure: Mistakes Were Made is a 2020 American comedy film directed by Tom McCarthy who co-wrote it with Stephan Pastis and Benjamin Pestana. It is based on Pastis' childrens book series, Timmy Failure and was produced by Walt Disney Pictures. It stars Winslow Fegley, Ophelia Lovibond, Craig Robinson and Wallace Shawn. The story follows a clueless and arrogant boy, Timmy Failure who runs a detective agency with his imaginary polar bear partner, Total.

Timmy Failure: Mistakes Were Made had its world premiere at the Sundance Film Festival on January 25, 2020 and was released on Disney+ on February 7. It received positive reviews from critics.

== Plot ==
Timmy Failure is an 11-year-old living in Portland, Oregon with his single mother Patty. Timmy runs Total Failure Inc alongside his own personal detective agency, and "solves" cases. Much of Timmy's adventures revolve around himself traveling with his imaginary polar bear partner Total across the city looking for cases and outwitting the "Russians" (actually just bearded hipsters). Among his small social group are his best friend, Charles "Rollo" Tookus, a former member of Total Failure Inc., who quit after a mission gone awry, and Molly Moskins, a perky and optimistic girl who has a crush on Timmy. Timmy considers his arch-enemy a girl named Corrina Corrina, who is actually very friendly to him and appears oblivious to his animosity towards her, though it is implied to be due to him having repressed feelings for her.

While retrieving a dead hamster from a classmate, Timmy's Failure-Mobile, a Segway that actually belongs to his mother, is stolen right out from under him. He cancels his other cases and recruits Rollo, who believes that the death of their class hamster and the stolen Segway are linked back to the Russians. At the library, Timmy learns from Molly that Corrina Corrina is part Russian and believes that she is behind the theft to dismantle his agency. Because of his unusual outbursts and behavior in class, Timmy begins seeing the school counselor, Mr. Jenkins, whom Timmy begins to slowly but surely trust with his mission. He also learns that Patty is dating a meter maid named Crispin who is friendly and aloof, but whom Timmy dislikes.

Timmy learns that Corrina Corrina's father owns a bank and believes that his Segway is there. He and Rollo try to sneak in but get kicked out by security. Mr. Jenkins manages to get Timmy to do his homework as part of a "mission", but while doing so learns from Patty that they have to move to an apartment, which upsets Timmy as he has a "heavy caseload." While on a field trip to Bonneville Dam, Timmy jumps to the false conclusion that Corrina Corrina plans to shut off the power to all of Portland. Unaware that she is still with the group, Timmy rushes through the dam to find her while being chased by his teacher, Mr. Crocus. They end up outside the dam just as the operators open the flood gates. Timmy tries protecting Crocus from the flood, as he considers him an intellectual equal, but it turns out that they are high above the flood gates. Timmy receives a three-day suspension for his behavior, and Crocus quits his job and is replaced while Patty angrily tells Timmy that she was fired because she had to stay home with Timmy, and shuts down Total Failure Inc for good as punishment. Saddened over his fate of having to be "normal" and moving to an apartment, Timmy lets Total go at the zoo.

Mr. Jenkins talks to Timmy and reminds him that he must learn from his mistakes so that he can be a better person. Invigorated after discovering a "Russian bug" in his cookie, Timmy recruits Crispin to liberate Total from the zoo. As they are driving back, they spot a purse snatcher and Crispin gives chase, catching him. Timmy considers aiding him but decides to simply call the police. After a passerby asks him and Total to move, acknowledging his presence, and Timmy subsequently accidentally backing up his truck into a pole, Patty comes to see Timmy in the hospital and he apologizes for his behavior. Patty tells Timmy that she wants him to re-open his detective agency. Soon after, Crispin shows Timmy that the Segway was impounded at the police station this whole time for being parked in a no-parking zone, convincing Timmy that the police are working with the Russians. Timmy comes out to give a speech at an animal fundraiser set up by Molly and excites the crowd with his speech on allowing polar bears into the school. As Timmy wishes that Crocus could be there, he suddenly believes that Crocus was kidnapped by Corrina Corrina and sets off with Total to "rescue" him.

== Cast ==
- Winslow Fegley as Timmy Failure
  - Troy Ames as 4-year-old Timmy
- Ophelia Lovibond as Patty Failure, Timmy's single mom
- Wallace Shawn as Frederick Crocus, Timmy's teacher and the main antagonist
- Craig Robinson as Mr. Jenkins, a school counselor who works with Timmy
- Kyle Bornheimer as Crispin Flavius, Patty's boyfriend
- Ai-Chan Carrier as Corrina Corrina, Timmy's rival, who is actually genuinely friendly to him
- Chloe Coleman as Molly Moskins, a girl who has a major crush on Timmy
- Kei as Charles "Rollo" Tookus, Timmy's best friend
- Arlo Weierhauser (Note: Credited as Caitlin Weierhauser) as Flo, the school librarian
- Ruby Matenko as Maxine Shellenberger, a classmate of Timmy's
- A. Brian Daniels as Portland police officer
- Dennis Lynch as Dan The Dam Man

== Production ==
On April 25, 2017, it was reported that director Tom McCarthy was in talks to direct an adaptation of Stephan Pastis' novel Timmy Failure for Walt Disney Pictures. McCarthy was expected to write the film's screenplay with Pastis and Jim Whitaker was set to serve as a producer. On February 8, 2018, it was announced that the film would premiere on Disney+, Disney's streaming service that launched in late 2019.

On June 9, 2017, it was initially reported that the film would go through pre-production from June 26 through September 15, 2017 with sixty days of filming following in Louisiana. The film was set with a budget of $42 million, with $32 million of that being spent in-state. That included an estimated $10 million on Louisiana payroll.

Filming took place during the week of June 27, 2018, in Surrey, British Columbia, Canada, where a set was constructed made to look like a border crossing between the United States and Canada. Production continued in Surrey on July 5, 2018, at the local Cloverdale Fairgrounds, where a scene was shot where a vehicle travels through a house. Principal photography and additional filming took place from July 27 through September 8, 2018 in Portland, Oregon.

On July 31, 2018, it was announced that Ophelia Lovibond had been cast in the role of Patty Failure. On January 24, 2019, it was reported that Craig Robinson had been cast in the film.

== Release ==
Timmy Failure: Mistakes Were Made had its world premiere at the Sundance Film Festival on January 25, 2020, and was released on Disney+ on February 7. The film was removed from Disney+ on May 26, 2023, amidst a Disney+ and Hulu content removal purge as part of a broader cost-cutting initiative under Disney CEO Bob Iger. It was, however, re-released on multiple VOD platforms on September 26, 2023.

== Reception ==
=== Critical response ===
On review aggregator Rotten Tomatoes, the film has an approval rating of 84% with an average rating of 7.00/10, based on 32 reviews. The website's critical consensus says, "A fun, fast paced film for all, Timmy Failure: Mistakes Were Made celebrates the power of imagination with a delightful sense of humor and just the right amount of bears." On Metacritic, the film has a weighted rating of 60 out of 100 based on 9 reviews, indicating "mixed or average".

John DeFore of The Hollywood Reporter reviewed Timmy Failure: Mistakes Were Made positively, describing it as a "charming" and "very funny film" that manages to be "the best of [Disney+]'s original programs by a wide margin." Brandon Zachary of Comic Book Ressources reviewed the movie positively, stating "Timmy Failure: Mistakes Were Made is a ridiculously charming film, and one of the best in its genre. It isn't trying to be more than the fun and imaginative family film that it is, and that's perfectly fine when it's as well-crafted as Timmy Failure." Clint Worthington of Consequence gave the film a positive review, calling it as "fun and entertaining" movie that "works for kids and adults alike" featuring "series of adorable performances, from Fegley and the rest of the kids to the all-too-game adults."

Jennifer Green of Common Sense Media rated the movie 4 out of 5 stars, writing, "Timmy Failure: Mistakes Were Made is a misfit whose refusal -- or inability -- to be a "normal" kid will resonate deeply with some kids. Still, the film—based on the popular books—keeps the tone largely upbeat and humorous, thanks to the boy's outlandish plots, his unique imaginary friend (a bear), and fantasies (like the gloomy "Our Crusher of Souls" middle school), as well as an eccentric cast of Portland characters and settings, sweet friends, and loving adults." Brian Tallerico of RogerEbert.com rated the film 3 out of 4 stars, praised the performances of the cast, and wrote, "To that end, it does start to feel remarkably episodic. [...] It's a fun movie to spend time with, and I don't think it needs to add up to much more than that." Sandy Schaefer of Screen Rant rated the movie 3.5 out of 5, stating, "Much like Spotlight succeeded in dramatizing a real-life story about journalism without sensationalizing it, Timmy Failure: Mistakes Were Made uses humor and a kid's way of looking at things to ground a tale about what growing up really means (learning to own your mistakes, realizing "normal" is a pretty useless term)."

=== Accolades ===
Year	Award	Category	Nominee(s)	Result	Ref.
2021	Visual Effects Society Awards	Outstanding Visual Effects in a Photoreal Episode	Rich McBride, Leslie Lerman, Nicolas Chevallier, Anders Beer, Tony Lazarowich	Nominated	
2021	Visual Effects Society Awards	Outstanding Animated Character in an Episode or Real-Time Project	Maxime Masse, Hennadii Prykhodko, Luc Girard, Sophie Burie	Nominated	
2021	Annie Awards	Outstanding Achievement for Character Animation in a Live Action Production	Anders J.L. Beer, Marianne Morency, Hennadii Prykhodko, Sophie Burie, Cedric Le Poullennec	Nominated	
