= Hooten & the Lady =

British television series

- Genre: Adventure; Comedy; Action
- Created by: Tony Jordan; James Payne; Sarah Phelps; Jeff Povey; Richard Zajdlic
- Starring: Ophelia Lovibond; Michael Landes; Shaun Parkes; Jessica Hynes
- Opening theme: "Restless Year" by Ezra Furman
- Composer: Magnus Fiennes
- Country of origin: United Kingdom
- No. of series: 1
- No. of episodes: 8

Production
- Executive producers: Tony Jordan; Simon Winstone
- Producer: Caroline Levy
- Running time: 47 minutes
- Production company: Red Planet Pictures

Original release
- Network: Sky 1
- Release: 16 September – 4 November 2016

Hooten & the Lady is a British adventure drama television series that follows the story of two treasure-hunting partners, British Museum curator Lady Alexandra (Ophelia Lovibond) who teams up with charismatic, roguish American adventurer Hooten (Michael Landes) in a series of global treasure-hunting escapades. It premiered on Sky 1 on 16 September 2016, and aired through 4 November 2016. The series premiered on The CW in the United States on 13 July 2017. It was cancelled by Sky 1 after one series in August 2017.

== Synopsis ==
Travelling across the world together, Ulysses Hooten and Lady Alexandra Lindo-Parker, initially unwilling partners, search for answers for the world's greatest mysteries. From the Amazon rainforest for Percy Fawcett's long-lost camp, to hunting across Russia for the 51st Fabergé egg, they explore the world of the mythical and legendary. They travel from the snowy Himalayan Mountains in an attempt to track down the only scroll written by Buddha, to the catacombs of Rome to find the Libri Sibyllini, and to Alexandria on the hunt for Alexander the Great's lost tomb. A continuing storyline is of Alex's mother, Lady Lindo-Parker, who attempts to organise her daughter's wedding to her fiancé Edward.

== Cast ==
=== Main ===
- Michael Landes as Ulysses Hooten
- Ophelia Lovibond as Lady Alexandra Lindo-Parker
- Jessica Hynes as Ella Bond
- Shaun Parkes as Clive Stephenson

=== Recurring ===
- Jane Seymour as Lady Lindo-Parker
- Jonathan Bailey as Edward
- Vincent Regan as Kane

== Episodes ==
No.	Title	Directed by	Written by	Original release date	UK viewers (millions)
1	"The Amazon"	Colin Teague	Tony Jordan	16 September 2016	1.20
British Museum curator Lady Alex Lindo-Parker travels to the Amazon in search of the lost camp of Victorian explorer Percy Fawcett. A series of mishaps sees her joined by maverick American adventurer Hooten and they stumble upon El Dorado.
2	"Rome"	Colin Teague	James Payne	23 September 2016	0.80
Hooten asks Lady Alex to help him find the long lost Sibylline Books, a collection of mystical prophecies. In Rome, the museum curator quickly finds herself scaling the Sistine Chapel, battling a sewer alligator and facing the Mafia. Guest starring Jane Seymour.
3	"Egypt"	Justin Molotnikov	Richard Zajdlic	30 September 2016	0.62
When Alex travels to Egypt she once again teams up with Hooten, this time to try to find the long-lost tomb of Alexander the Great – but the intrepid pair soon discover that some unscrupulous locals are on their trail. Guest starring Angel Coulby.
4	"Bhutan"	Justin Molotnikov	Jeff Povey	7 October 2016	0.71
Alex gets a lead on an ancient scroll that is rumoured to have been written by the Buddha himself. She enlists Hooten to go with her to the Himalayan kingdom of Bhutan to find it but ends up racing against time to save his life.
5	"Ethiopia"	Andy Hay	Karla Crome	14 October 2016	0.50
When Ella is kidnapped in Ethiopia Lady Alex and Hooten head to Africa where they must overcome crazed bandits and surly camels in order to save the day.
6	"Moscow"	Julian Holmes	Sarah Phelps	21 October 2016	0.65
Alex jets off to Moscow to help Hooten search for a lost Fabergé egg and confronts her arch enemy from university, who now works for a shadowy black market collector.
7	"Cambodia"	Daniel O'Hara	Richard Zajdlic	28 October 2016	0.71
Alex and Hooten attempt to track down the priceless Cintamani jewel in Cambodia, which can manifest whatever one wishes for, but they soon attract the attentions of a ruthless Vietnamese drug gang. Guest starring Vincent Regan.
8	"The Caribbean"	Daniel O'Hara	Tony Jordan	4 November 2016	0.81
Alex puts her wedding in jeopardy when she follows Hooten to an idyllic island in the Caribbean to hunt for the long lost pirate treasure of Captain Henry Morgan. Alex finally marries her fiancé Edward.

== Reception ==
Hooten and the Lady was well received by critics. Sam Wollaston of The Guardian compared the show to Indiana Jones. Louisa Mellor from Den of Geek described the show as being "a great deal of fun" and "enjoyably retro". Latoya Ferguson of Variety described the series as 'predictable' but praised the leads and the lack of romantic involvement between them was 'refreshing'.

=== U.S. ratings ===
The CW aired the series in summer 2017.

Season 1

Title	Air date	Rating/Share (A18–49)	U.S. Viewers (millions)
"The Amazon"	13 July 2017	0.2/1	0.919
"Rome"	20 July 2017	0.2/1	0.881
"Egypt"	27 July 2017	0.2/1	0.91
"Bhutan"	31 July 2017	0.2/1	0.907
"Ethiopia"	7 August 2017	0.2/1	1.023
"Moscow"	14 August 2017	0.2/1	0.922
"Cambodia"	28 August 2017	0.2/1	0.999
"The Caribbean"	11 September 2017	0.2/1	0.92
