= An Inspector Calls (2015 TV film) =

British thriller-drama

- Poster
- Genre: Drama; Thriller
- Based on: An Inspector Calls by J. B. Priestley
- Written by: Helen Edmundson
- Directed by: Aisling Walsh
- Starring: David Thewlis; Sophie Rundle; Chloe Pirrie; Finn Cole; Miranda Richardson; Ken Stott; Kyle Soller
- Composer: Dominik Scherrer
- Country of origin: United Kingdom
- Original language: English

Production
- Producers: Roanna Benn; Greg Brenman; Howard Ella
- Cinematography: Martin Fuhrer
- Editor: Alex Mackie
- Running time: 90 minutes
- Production companies: Drama Republic; BBC

Original release
- Network: BBC One
- Release: 13 September 2015

An Inspector Calls is a 2015 British thriller television film written by Helen Edmundson, based on the 1945 J. B. Priestley play of the same name. It is directed by Aisling Walsh, produced by Howard Ella and stars David Thewlis as the titular character. The film was first broadcast on 13 September 2015 on BBC One.

The film is set in 1912 and follows the events of a single evening on which the wealthy Birling family is holding a dinner party to celebrate the engagement of their daughter. The festivities are interrupted by a visit from what is taken to be a policeman, Inspector Goole, who is investigating the recent suicide of a local young woman. Goole’s interrogations of each member of the dinner party make it clear that all of them have contributed to the tragedy through individually unjust, selfish or exploitative behaviour. The "Inspector" leaves the subdued group with a warning that human beings have shared responsibility for each other and that this lesson will soon be taught "in fire and blood and anguish" — an apparent reference to the outbreak of World War I two years later. Final scenes establish that Goole is not a real policeman, and suggest that he is some form of supernatural messenger.

== Plot ==
In 1912 the wealthy Birling family live in the industrial town of Brumley in the North Midlands. The Birlings are celebrating the engagement of their daughter Sheila to Gerald Croft, the son of a factory owner who is even more successful than the Birlings. Also at the dinner party is the Birlings' son Eric (whose alcoholism the family ignores). After dinner Mr Birling lectures Sheila, Eric and Gerald on the importance of men looking after themselves, which will lead them to a perfect future (which he believes will include a place on the next honours list for him). Eventually, Mrs Birling and Sheila withdraw, with the men promising to join them soon. While Mr Birling and Gerald smoke cigars together, Mrs Birling lectures Eric in private. Eric then returns to the dining room, where his father compares him to Gerald and tells Eric about how Gerald’s father sometimes leaves him in charge of the factory.

The evening is interrupted, however, when Edna, the maid, tells the men that a police inspector has arrived. He introduces himself as Inspector Goole, and says he is investigating the suicide of a young woman named Eva Smith. He shows a photograph of her to Mr Birling, but won’t let Eric or Gerald see it, saying that he likes to take one thing at a time. Mr Birling admits that he knew Eva and that she had worked in his factory. He says that he dismissed her after she led a strike in which most of the female workers came out demanding equal pay with the male workers. The strike lasted over a week, but they returned to work after running out of money. Eva was subsequently sacked. Although Birling admits he left Eva without a means of earning money, he denies responsibility for her death.

Having been sent by her mother to bring Birling, Eric and Gerald to the drawing room, Sheila enters and is shown the photograph of Eva. She says she had been out shopping one day with her mother at Milwards (a popular department store) when she noticed a very nice dress and was smitten with it. Her mother told her the dress wouldn’t suit her tall figure, but Sheila was convinced it would and suggested that her mother let her look at clothes on her own. Before she left for the tea room, Mrs Birling held up the dress against Eva Smith, who, because of an influenza epidemic, had been able to find employment at Milwards without a reference. With her mother gone, Sheila tried on the dress, with Eva's help. As soon as she looked in the mirror, Sheila realised that the dress didn't suit her and felt humiliated. Thinking that Eva was mocking her (though she was just imagining it), she angrily ordered the manager to sack her, which he reluctantly did.

Sheila is devastated by her actions and feels guilty. Mrs Birling enters the dining room shortly after. The inspector then mentions that Eva had changed her name to Daisy Renton. Gerald is noticeably startled, and admits having met a woman by that name in the Palace Bar, a pub well known for being a place for men to pick up prostitutes. Daisy had taken to prostitution to support herself. After helping her get away from an old, overweight man who wanted to hire her for the night, Gerald took Eva out with him. Seeing that she was hungry and struggling to cope financially, Gerald gave her money and arranged for her to move temporarily into a vacant flat belonging to one of Gerald's friends. Under interrogation, Gerald reveals that he began a relationship with Daisy over the summer, but parted with her after a few months. Sheila heartbrokenly returns her engagement ring to Gerald, who leaves for a walk.

The Inspector turns his attention to Mrs Birling, a patron of a charity that helps women in difficult situations, which Daisy (who was by then pregnant and destitute) had turned to for help. Daisy introduced herself as Mrs Birling, which offended the real Mrs Birling. Daisy then revealed that she had a new name, Alice Grey. Alice explained that the father of her child was an immature alcoholic who could not act as a father yet and could not support her. Mrs Birling, however, persuaded the committee to deny her a grant, believing that Daisy had been irresponsible and suggested that she find the father, despite Daisy repeating that he wouldn’t be of any use. Despite vigorous cross-examination from the inspector, she denies any wrongdoing. Goole then plays his final card, forcing Mrs Birling to lay the blame on the 'drunken young man' who got Smith pregnant. It slowly dawns on the family, except Mrs Birling, that Eric is the young man involved.

Eric then enters, and after brief questioning from Goole, breaks down and admits responsibility for the pregnancy, having raped Alice after a drinking spree at the Palace Bar. After finding out that she was pregnant, Eric stole £50 (£4938 in 2025) from his father's business in order to support her and their child, but she refused the stolen money and dismissed him. Mr and Mrs Birling are outraged by Eric's behaviour, and the evening dissolves into angry recriminations. The inspector reports that Eva/Daisy/Alice died by drinking cleaning disinfectant. He concludes by reminding the family that actions have consequences and that all people are intertwined in one society. He then leaves.

When the family talk over what has happened, they begin to question whether their visitor was a real police inspector. Mr Birling makes a phone call to the chief constable, who confirms that there is no Inspector Goole on the force. With a further call to the infirmary confirming that no recent cases of suicide have been reported, the family surmise that the inspector was a fraud and that they have been the victims of a hoax. Gerald and the elder Birlings celebrate in relief, but Eric and Sheila continue to feel guilt. The phone then rings and the police tell them that a young woman has just died in the infirmary in a suspected suicide, and that they are on their way to question the family. The inspector's identity is left unexplained (though a clue is in the name), but it is clear that the family's confessions over the course of the evening have all been true, and that public disgrace will soon befall them.

== Cast ==
- David Thewlis as Inspector Goole
- Sophie Rundle as Eva Smith/Daisy Renton/'Mrs Birling'/Alice Grey
- Chloe Pirrie as Sheila Birling
- Finlay Cole as Eric Birling
- Miranda Richardson as Sybil Birling
- Ken Stott as Arthur Birling
- Kyle Soller as Gerald Croft
- Lucy Chappell as Edna
- Flora Nicholson as Miss Francis
- Gary Davis as Alderman Meggarty
- Wanda Opalinska as Charity Lady

== Production ==
In February 2015, filming began in Saltaire, West Yorkshire. Although the exterior shots of the mill were filmed at Saltaire, the interior shots of the mill were filmed at Queen Street Mill on the outskirts of Burnley, Lancashire. A full-sized office was built in the middle of the Weaving Shed for this production and was dismantled once filming was completed. A large number of scenes were also filmed at Scampston Hall, near Malton, and in the market town of Malton. The exterior is Attingham House.

Like the 1954 version, this adaptation employs flashbacks to the events described (allowing some dialogue to be eliminated), as well as additional scenes showing more of the life and death of Eva, and the Inspector after he leaves the Birlings' home.

== Critical reception ==
The programme was watched by nearly six million viewers. For The Daily Telegraph, Anita Singh was generally positive, writing that the programme was 'as good an adaptation as it could be' and praising Helen Edmundson for her 'decent job of expanding the drama'.

The Guardian’s Sam Wollaston was positive in his review, writing that Priestley’s 'play might be set over a hundred years ago, in 1912, but the messages and sentiments – about social responsibility and a shared humanity – remain important and relevant...An Inspector Calls, sensitively adapted here by Helen Edmundson, time-travels remarkably well: it translates into gripping 21st-century television.'
