= Sardines (Inside No. 9) =

- Inside No. 9 episode
- Episode poster, designed by Graham Humphreys
- Episode no.: Series 1 Episode 1
- Directed by: David Kerr
- Written by: Steve Pemberton and Reece Shearsmith
- Original air date: 5 February 2014
- Running time: 30 minutes

Guest appearances
- Katherine Parkinson as Rebecca; Tim Key as Ian; Luke Pasqualino as Lee; Ophelia Lovibond as Rachel; Anne Reid as Geraldine; Julian Rhind-Tutt as Mark; Anna Chancellor as Elizabeth; Marc Wootton as "Stinky" John; Ben Willbond as Jeremy; Timothy West as Andrew

Episode chronology
← Previous —	Next → "A Quiet Night In"

"Sardines" is the first episode of the first series of the British black comedy anthology series Inside No. 9. Written by Steve Pemberton and Reece Shearsmith, it premiered on BBC Two and BBC Two HD on 5 February 2014. In the episode, a group of adults play sardines at an engagement party. Rebecca, the bride-to-be, finds a boring man named Ian in a wardrobe; he introduces himself as a colleague of Jeremy, Rebecca's fiancé. The pair are subsequently joined by family, friends and colleagues of Rebecca and Jeremy. As more people enter the room and step into the wardrobe, secrets shared by some of the characters are revealed, with various allusions to incestuous relationships, child abuse, and adultery. The humour is both dark and British, with references to past unhappiness and polite but awkward interactions.

The story takes place entirely in the bedroom of a country house, with much of the filming taking place inside the wardrobe. Pemberton and Shearsmith wrote the episode with the intention of evoking a feeling of claustrophobia in viewers. In addition to the writers, the episode starred Katherine Parkinson, Tim Key, Luke Pasqualino, Ophelia Lovibond, Anne Reid, Julian Rhind-Tutt, Anna Chancellor, Marc Wootton, Ben Willbond and Timothy West. The cast and writing were praised by television critics, and the episode was chosen as pick of the day in a number of publications. On its first showing, "Sardines" was watched by 1.1 million viewers, which was 5.6% of the audience.

== Development and production ==
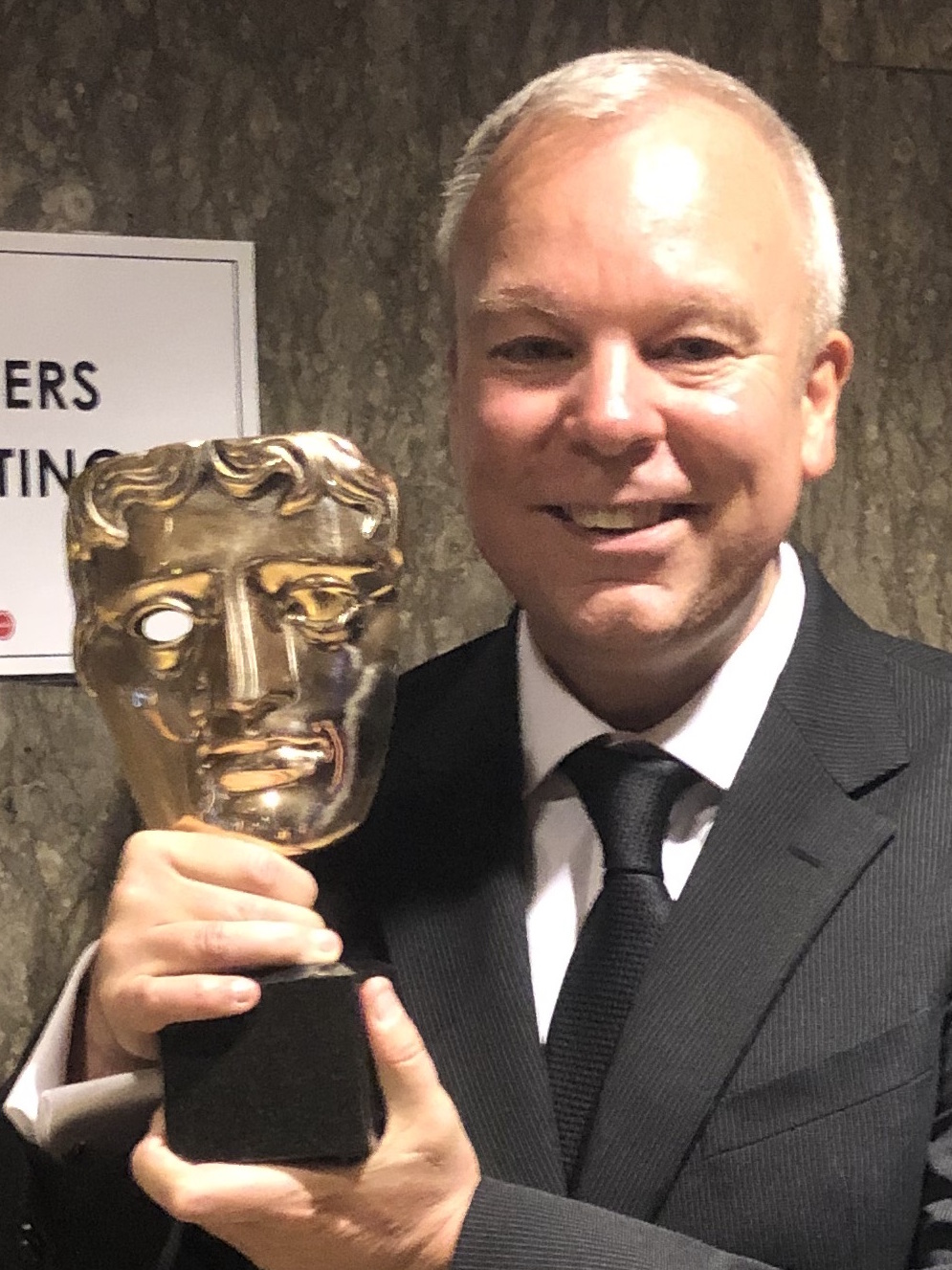
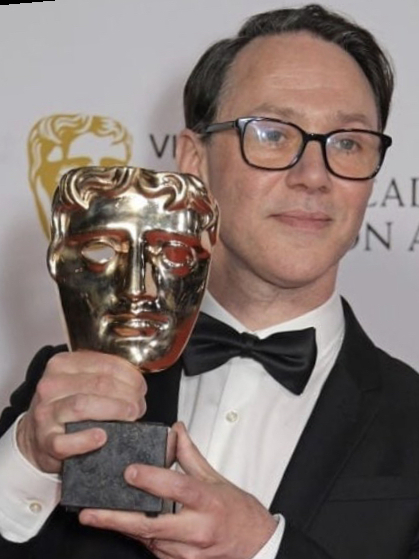
Steve Pemberton (left, 2019) and Reece Shearsmith (right, 2021) co-wrote and starred in "Sardines"

The comedy writers and actors Steve Pemberton and Reece Shearsmith, who had worked together on The League of Gentlemen and Psychoville, took inspiration for Inside No. 9 from "David and Maureen", the fourth episode of the first series of Psychoville, which was inspired by Alfred Hitchcock's Rope. "David and Maureen" took place in a room, and it was filmed in two shots. The writers were keen to explore other stories in this bottle episode or TV play format, and Inside No. 9 allowed them to do this. The concept of Inside No. 9 was a "reaction" to Psychoville, with Shearsmith saying that "We'd been so involved with labyrinthine over-arching, we thought it would be nice to do six different stories with a complete new house of people each week. That's appealing, because as a viewer you might not like this story, but you've got a different one next week."

The format of the series pays homage to Tales of the Unexpected, The Twilight Zone and Alfred Hitchcock Presents. Pemberton and Shearsmith returned to writing more macabre stories, according to the latter, as they "always feel slightly unfulfilled if [they] write something that's purely comedic, it just feels too frivolous and light". During the filming of "Sardines", Shearsmith said "being in the middle of filming a third series of Psychoville would be utterly depressing". Pemberton and Shearsmith aimed for a simpler experience than Psychoville, describing "Sardines" as "just about some good actors in a wardrobe with a good story". As each episode of Inside No. 9 features new characters, the writers were able to attract actors who might have been unwilling to commit to an entire series. In addition to Pemberton and Shearsmith, "Sardines" starred Katherine Parkinson, Tim Key, Luke Pasqualino, Ophelia Lovibond, Anne Reid, Julian Rhind-Tutt, Anna Chancellor, Marc Wootton, Ben Willbond, and Timothy West. West had appeared in Tales of the Unexpected, and Shearsmith said that "it was a great nod" to have West in the episode. "Sardines" has more characters than any other episode of the first series of Inside No. 9, and these characters were written before casting. Pemberton recalls the fun he had in selecting a cast for the episode, aiming to bring together a varied group of actors who would work well as a group.

Pemberton described the concept of "Sardines" as "a simple idea" and he was happy that they did not "have to worry about the consequences of it", due to the format of the series. The writers were inspired by a large wardrobe in their workspace. They had already written several other episodes for the series, and confinement was a recurring theme; the possibility of putting characters into a wardrobe gave them the opportunity to develop the theme to a more extreme level. The story was not initially about the game of sardines. Pemberton said that the writers "talked about various ideas of why [the characters] were in a wardrobe", but that the pair "were certainly not working out [their] Freudian psychobabble". A list of characters was written before the script, and the script included the introduction of a new character every three pages.

"Sardines" was written so that a feeling of claustrophobia would develop as the story progressed; Pemberton said that "our first consideration was, 'Can we get 12 people in a wardrobe?' So when we did the script read-through, the designer bought a wardrobe off eBay and we checked whether we could all get in it and shut the door". Writers for Broadcast described seeing the assortment of actors "crammed inside an imposing wardrobe" during filming as "an arresting spectacle". The story is filmed from within a single bedroom, with much of it taking place inside the wardrobe. Filming presented a particular challenge, as the aim was to give the impression that the viewer was in the wardrobe with the characters, and not to "cheat" by giving the impression that the viewer was outside the wardrobe looking in. The episode was filmed with two wardrobes; one complete one, and one "faked" one. The complete prop was used to film the characters entering the wardrobe, while the other was in a different room for close-up shots from "within" the wardrobe. For the director David Kerr, the difficulty was sustaining the illusion that everything was happening in one place, ideally without viewers realising that there was a technical challenge involved. The episode was filmed mostly in sequence, meaning more actors arrived as the filming continued, reflecting the fact that more characters arrive as the episode progresses. Kerr aimed for a particularly "immersive" filming style on the episode, with extensive use of wide angle shots. He aimed to avoid "leading" the audience with regard to the more important characters by "not giving [them] coverage" earlier in the episode.

== Plot ==
External videos
- "Boo"; Carl finds Rebecca and Ian in the wardrobe
- "Someone make a noise..." Mark and Liz share a moment, unaware that Rebecca, Carl, Stuart, Geraldine and Ian are watching from the wardrobe

Rebecca and Jeremy host their engagement party at her family's stately home. The guests play sardines, a variation of hide-and-seek in which one person hides and the other players join them in their hiding place once found. Rebecca finds a boring man called Ian in a bedroom wardrobe. As they wait for more people to arrive, Ian mistakenly calls her "Rachel". A young man, Lee, enters the room but does not find the pair, though they are later found and joined by Rebecca's prudish brother, Carl, and then Carl's flamboyant partner, Stuart. Jeremy's ex-girlfriend Rachel finds and joins them. Ian mentions that Jeremy frequently talks about "you", but it is unclear whether he is talking to Rebecca or Rachel. To Rebecca's annoyance, Stuart, Rachel and Ian leave the wardrobe for a break. Stuart enters the en suite where Geraldine (Rebecca and Carl's former nanny) is on the toilet. In the wardrobe, Carl and Rebecca talk; he is uncomfortable, and, when she asks why, he tells her to "look where we are".

Ian, Rachel, and Geraldine join Rebecca and Carl. Geraldine says that the room is normally locked, but Rebecca rebukes her. Stuart rejoins the group after using the toilet. As the group talk, Mark (Jeremy's boss) and his wife, Liz, enter the bedroom, unaware of the people in the wardrobe. The pair talk candidly before beginning foreplay on the bed. Geraldine shouts to alert them, and the wardrobe occupants pretend they did not hear Mark and Liz's conversation. Mark and Liz reluctantly enter the wardrobe. As the doors close, Rachel's boyfriend Lee re-enters the room, but as the wardrobe has become more cramped, Stuart and Lee hide under the bed, while Ian moves to the en suite. Stuart and Carl argue, and it is revealed that Carl has a fear of intimacy. When "Stinky" John enters the room, the others claim there is no room in their hiding places, so he hides behind a curtain. Jeremy enters and tells Rebecca he is going to pick up another guest from the train station, but as he turns to leave he mistakenly calls her "Rachel". Andrew, Rebecca and Carl's father, enters and becomes annoyed when he sees people hiding in different places. He takes charge, forcing Jeremy, Stuart, Lee, and Stinky John into the wardrobe, then follows them in.

Everyone becomes uncomfortable, not least because of John's odour. Geraldine passes around mints as Andrew tells Mark that he no longer has contact with Dicky Lawrence, a potential business contact of Mark's. Andrew sings the "sardine song", but Carl angrily stops him. Andrew and Geraldine reminisce about a scout jamboree held in the house many years ago, but Geraldine remembers that a boy named Phillip Harrison, nicknamed "Little Pip", accused Andrew of "horrible things", and that the police were involved. Carl says Andrew paid Pip's family to move away, and Andrew counters by claiming he did nothing to Pip and was only teaching him how to wash himself. Carl implies that he and John were not as lucky as Pip, and John says he can smell carbolic soap and panics. There is silence, and Stuart points out no one else is looking for them, but they realise Ian has not yet returned. Jeremy says Ian is the person he was going to pick up from the station, but when Mark claims Ian is already at the party, Jeremy reveals the person Mark is referring to is not Ian. Outside, "Ian" locks the wardrobe and sprays it with lighter fluid while singing the sardine song. Carl realises "Ian" is Phillip, and the episode ends with Phillip leaning against the wardrobe, a lighter in his hand, pouring lighter fluid around the wardrobe.

== Cast ==
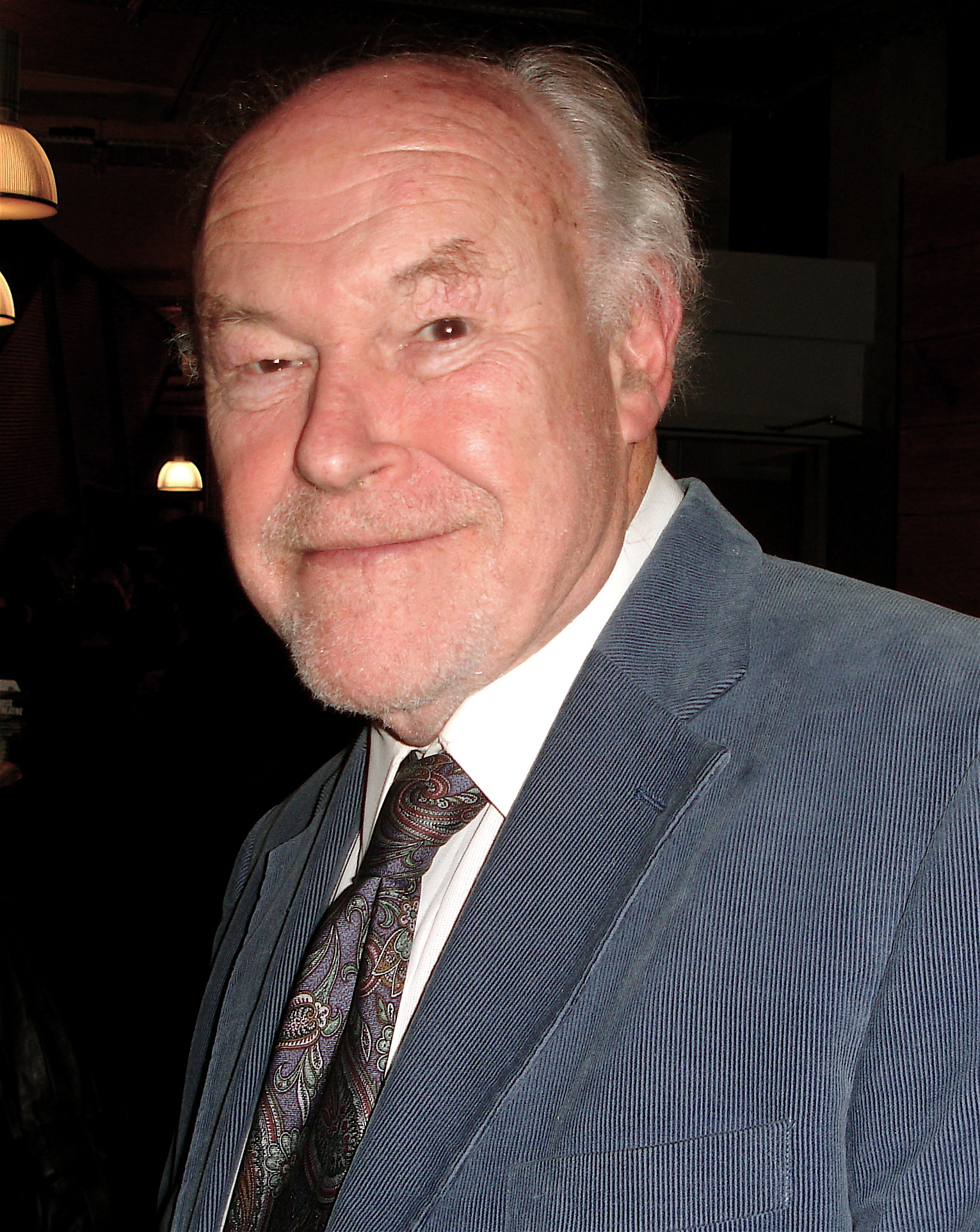
Timothy West (pictured in 2010) appeared as Andrew, father of Rebecca, having previously starred in Tales of the Unexpected. Shearsmith said that, due to this prior appearance, "it was a great nod" to have West in the episode.

The cast of "Sardines", in order of the characters' first appearances.
Actor	Role	Notes
Katherine Parkinson	Rebecca	The bride-to-be; she is keen that everyone play the game and enjoy it
Tim Key	Ian	Apparently a boring man who works with Jeremy and Mark, eventually revealed to be "Little Pip"
Luke Pasqualino	Lee	Rachel's current boyfriend; at the age of 21 years, younger than the other characters; ostensibly a roofer
Steve Pemberton	Carl	Rebecca's prudish older brother
Reece Shearsmith	Stuart	Carl's flamboyant partner
Ophelia Lovibond	Rachel	Jeremy's ex-girlfriend; the pair still communicate frequently using BlackBerry Messenger
Anne Reid	Geraldine	Andrew's housekeeper and former nanny to Rebecca and Carl; though invited to serve drinks, she understands herself a guest
Julian Rhind-Tutt	Mark	Jeremy and Ian's boss; he is keen to talk to Andrew about Dickie Lawrence, a possible business contact
Anna Chancellor	Elizabeth	Mark's partner; she has no desire to be at the party and lies about her babysitter being ill
Marc Wootton	"Stinky" John	A childhood friend of Rebecca and Carl; some event caused him to stop washing
Ben Willbond	Jeremy	The groom-to-be
Timothy West	Andrew	Rebecca and Carl's father

== Analysis ==
It's like the backroom of Cinderella's at Wakefield. Has anyone got any poppers or lube? (Note: The line is spoken approximately six minutes into the episode, but is misquoted in The Independent as "It's like the backroom of Cinderella's in Wakefield in here, but without any poppers or lube.")

— Shearsmith's Stuart, whose lines include the episode's most overt jokes

We're not going down that road, Geraldine; it's a party, remember?

— Rebecca rebukes Geraldine. Allusions to past unhappiness occur frequently in Shearsmith and Pemberton's work.

The episode is, in effect, a one-scene, one-act, play. Writing in The Times, Andrew Billen observed that Aristotle "ruled that plays should take place over a single day in a single place", while "Sardines" takes place "over half an hour in a single wardrobe". The use of the wardrobe is reminiscent of Beckettian absurd theatre, and presented particular cinematographic challenges. For Ryan Lambie, writing for the entertainment website Den of Geek, the single-camera setup and Kerr's direction gave the episode "the tense look of an early Hitchcock film, all low angles and illuminating shafts of light".

The characters bring their respective agendas, relationships, and backstories into the wardrobe. The various interconnected plotlines are seeded towards the start of the episode, and more is gradually revealed before they are resolved. "Sardines" starts as comedic, before becoming darker; as more characters arrive, their relatively cordial interactions become more unpleasant. The increasingly claustrophobic environment serves to heighten the tension.

The comedy is black, with the most overt humour coming from Stuart, a flamboyant character played by Shearsmith. The humour is also extremely British. Tropes of Britishness identified by the critic David Upton include the dated clothing and the awkward interaction between Rebecca and Ian at the start of the episode. Despite not knowing each other, they converse courteously, which "smacks of more refined days"; the conversation is a "portrayal of social awkwardness". With the introduction of the noticeably younger Lee, there is a clash of customs, illustrating the differing norms of the respective generations. This "1940s aesthetic" and the fact the story took place in a single location tied the episode to "a golden age of plays on British television". The broadcaster and writer Mark Radcliffe felt that the script "could be a really arresting stage play".

As is typical of Shearsmith and Pemberton's work, "Sardines" addresses dark topics. Writing in The Daily Telegraph, Paul Kendall identified some of Shearsmith and Pemberton's "regular tropes" utilised in the episode; namely "a bunch of misfits, uncomfortable silences and allusions to dark crimes in the distant past". Billen felt that the treatment of dark issues was reminiscent of the work of Alan Ayckbourn. Particular themes addressed in the episode include murder, incestuous relationships, child sexual abuse, vengeance and adultery. As the episode progresses, secrets related to these themes are revealed to be the explanation for apparently innocuous tendencies, such as Carl's dislike for the sardine song and John's aversion to soap.

== Reception ==
"Sardines" was well received by television critics. Kendall, Billen, Keith Watson, and Dan Owen (writing for The Daily Telegraph, the Metro, MSN and The Times, respectively) each gave the episode four out of five stars, while, writing for The Arts Desk, Veronica Lee gave it five out of five. The episode was labelled "pick of the day" in The Times, The Sunday Times, The Observer and the Daily Record.

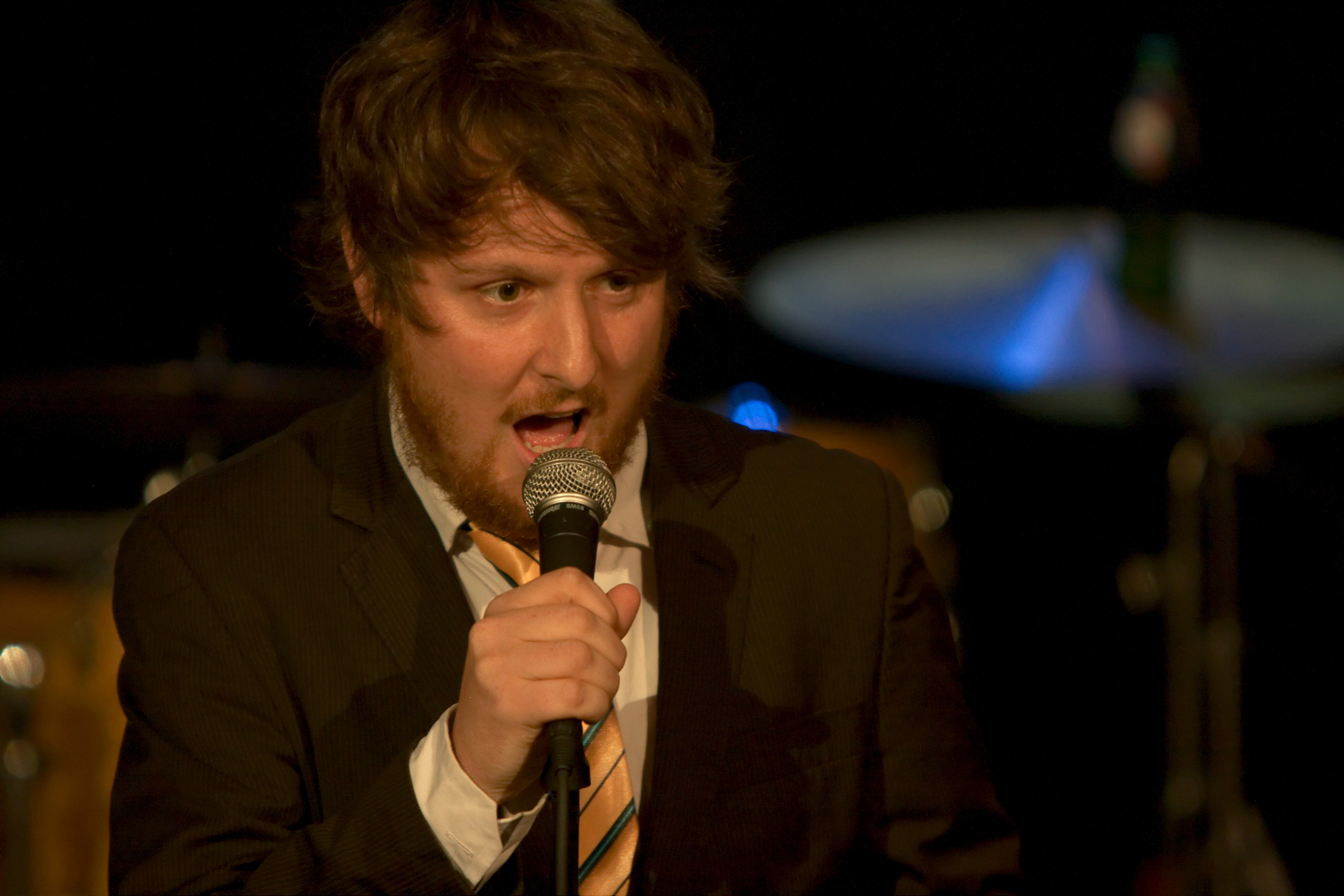
Tim Key (pictured in 2010) was praised for his portrayal of Ian

Reviewers responded positively to the cast. Kendall described the acting as "top notch" and Owen said that all cast-members "played their roles to perfection", while Jane Simon, writing for the Daily Mirror, said that "every twinge of awkwardness and discomfort is played to perfection as the mood turns darker". Harry Venning, writing for The Stage, described the cast as "impressively stellar", and also commended the writers' performances. The comedy critic Bruce Dessau said that the "cast alone is almost recommendation enough", while another reviewer said that if "a bomb dropped on the cupboard where they were hiding, a good portion of the acting talent in this country would be wiped out." Key's portrayal of Ian and Parkinson's portrayal of Rebecca were particularly praised.

Journalists also lauded the script, with Kendall labelling the dialogue "perfectly pitched", Dessau calling it "tightly written" and without wastage, and Owen praising the way each character was "delivered into the story at the exact right moment". Brad Newsome, writing for The Sydney Morning Herald (the episode having been shown in Australia on BBC First in 2015), said that the episode was "deftly written", and Venning said the "lean, mean narrative didn't just twist and turn, it folded back upon itself to provide a totally unexpected, profoundly disturbing and deeply satisfying denouement". On The Arts Desk, Lee praised the direction of Kerr, saying that he delivered "a pitch-perfect piece with no character overwritten or line overplayed".

Dean, writing for The Independent, commended the writers' "weaving together of the morbid with the laugh-out loud", and Mike Bradley, writing in The Observer, called the episode "wickedly funny"; similarly, Newsome said the episode displayed "a wicked sense of humour". Dessau concurred on the darkness and quality of humour. Watson was more ambivalent, saying the episode offered "more of a knowing chuckle than an outright belly laugh".

Watson wrote that "the chief joy [of the episode] was the stealthy way the atmospheric story was built up layer by layer". In The Times, Billen described "Sardines" as "a disciplined comedy, but a little bit of discipline, as one of the League's perverts might say, never did anyone any harm". With the exception of the ending, Billen "loved it". A separate review in The Times, however, praised the twist ending; "this isn't just an inspired set-up performed by a stellar cast – it builds to a macabre and horribly imagined climax". Owen was ambivalent about the ending of "Sardines", saying that it "worked very well in terms of narrative, but perhaps it landed with too much softness". Mark Jones, writing in The Guardian, gave a more mixed review overall, describing "Sardines" as a "slow burner, but a decent introduction to a series". Newsome called the episode a "gem of an opener".

Retrospective reviews rated the episode as one of Inside No. 9's best. In The Telegraph, it was listed as the seventh best episode of the first 38; the "first episode of all set the bar intimidatingly high", according to Michael Hogan. Writers for Chortle said that Inside No. 9's "very first episode established [it] as something special", ranking "Sardines" as the third best episode of the programme's first 37. In The Guardian, it was listed the third best episode of the first 25, while in i it was listed as the ninth best of the first 24.

=== Viewing figures ===
On its first showing, "Sardines" was seen by 1.1 million viewers, which was 5.6% of the British audience. This was lower than the premiere of Psychoville, but higher than the audience towards the end of the second series. "Sardines" immediately followed the first episode of the two-part Royal Cousins at War, a BBC documentary. This had stronger viewing figures, with 2 million viewers (8.6% of the audience). Nonetheless, "Sardines" was more highly viewed than is typical for the slot. Despite this strong start for the series, the viewing figures for Inside No. 9 later dipped; the average viewing for the series was 904,000 people, or 4.9% of the audience, lower than the slot average of 970,000 (5.1% of the audience).
