= Clair Cline =

American carpenter, World War II veteran

Cline with his violin

Clair W. Cline (September 30, 1917 – September 19, 2010) was an American carpenter and cabinetmaker, who was a prisoner of war during World War II. He had the rank of first lieutenant in the 448th Bombardment Group, and was captured by German soldiers when his plane was shot down over Holland in 1944. At Stalag Luft I, he built a violin out of scrap wood and other materials found in the prison camp, and played simple tunes to lift the mood of fellow prisoners.

== Early life ==
Cline was born September 30, 1917, and grew up on a farm in rural Minnesota. His uncle gave him a violin when he was a child. As he honed his skills as a woodworker, he repaired and made parts for country fiddles. During the Great Depression of the 1930s, he worked as a carpenter and as a short-order cook. He later cited his father's resourcefulness in repairing farm equipment as a major influence in his life.

== Military service ==
In 1941, Cline was drafted and assigned to the United States Army Air Force as an aviation cadet. Stationed at McChord Field, he trained to become a bomber pilot.

In February 1944, when he was 26 years old, his B-24 was shot down over Holland. After his capture by German soldiers, he was sent to the prisoner-of-war camp Stalag Luft I.

Under the Geneva Convention on Prisoners of War, he and other officers were not put to work. In order to battle boredom, Cline took up sewing and carving model airplanes. He first got the idea to build a violin when he overheard a fellow prisoner whistling the old fiddle tune "Red Wing".

Cline built a working violin, using wood scraps from bed slats, aid crates, and table legs. His tools included shards of glass and a table knife ground into a chisel, as well as a penknife. Other men helped scrape glue from chairs, which they boiled down for re-use. He acquired catgut for the violin strings, and obtained a bow by trading cigarettes provided by the Red Cross with one of the guards. The project took four months. Cline played the violin to provide solace to his fellow prisoners.

After Stalag Luft I was liberated in the spring of 1945, Cline took the violin home.

== Life after the war ==
Following the war, a plastic chin rest was added to the violin. Cline kept his camp violin at his home in Tacoma for over 50 years, until in 1995 he donated it to the Intrepid museum, a military history museum on board the USS Intrepid in New York City. The violinist Glenn Dicterow, who was concertmaster of the New York Philharmonic, played it at a special concert commemorating the event, and afterward complimented its maker, admitting that he had expected "a jalopy of a violin" but instead found it "looking very good and sounding quite wonderful."

Cline worked as a cabinetmaker in Tacoma and made further stringed instruments including "a dozen more violins, three basses, a cello and two violas" as a hobby. He built a bass viol for his son, Roger, who attended graduate school at University of Michigan, joined the U.S. Military Academy Band at West Point, and went on to become a bassist for the Cleveland Symphony Orchestra.

== Death and legacy ==
Cline died on September 19, 2010 in Tacoma, Washington, at the age of 92. In 2015, a Belgian film crew interviewed his family for a documentary. In 2017, BYUtv released a feature-length film, Instrument of War, based on the story of his life, with the role of Cline played by the British actor Jack Ashton.

His grandchildren included a professional cellist and violist.
