= Locked In (2023 film) =

Film by Nour Wazzi

- Release poster
- Directed by: Nour Wazzi
- Written by: Rowan Joffé
- Produced by: Nicky Bentham
- Starring: Famke Janssen; Rose Williams; Alex Hassell; Finn Cole; Anna Friel
- Cinematography: Remi Adefarasin
- Edited by: Fiona DeSouza
- Music by: Alex Baranowski
- Production companies: Gaumont; Neon Films; Panacea Productions
- Distributed by: Netflix
- Release date: 1 November 2023
- Running time: 97 minutes
- Countries: United Kingdom; France
- Language: English

Locked In is a 2023 psychological thriller film directed by Nour Wazzi and written by Rowan Joffé. It stars Famke Janssen, Rose Williams and Finn Cole. It was released on streaming service Netflix on 1 November 2023.

== Plot ==
Katherine, a former TV star, wakes up in the hospital after a severe accident that has left her with locked-in syndrome, where she is completely paralyzed and cannot communicate. A nurse named Nicky begins to work with Katherine, to try to help her regain bodily control. Nicky seeks information about Katherine from Lina, the wife of Katherine's deceased step-son, Jamie. In a series of flashbacks, we learn of the events which transpired before the accident.

Katherine's husband was very wealthy and left everything to his son Jamie after his death. Jamie longed for Katherine's love and care, but she was often preoccupied with resentment over her disinheritance.

Lina is the daughter of a childhood friend of Katherine's. Upon the death of Lina's mother, Katherine had taken her in and adopted her. Lina took responsibility for Jamie, becoming his primary caregiver and forming a close bond with him. Lina and Jamie married in adulthood, and Katherine became bitter over Lina's ownership of the family estate by way of marrying Jamie.

Dr. Robert Lawrence, the family doctor, becomes involved in their lives and starts an affair with Lina, who's struggling with the lack of fulfillment and autonomy in her isolated life. However, Robert's ulterior motive is hoping to inherit the property. He prescribes Jamie painkillers which cause his health to deteriorate. Later, Robert persuades Jamie to take a boat ride with him and Lina. On the water, Robert deliberately capsizes the boat, and pulls Jamie deep underwater until he drowns. Lina attempts to rescue him but fails.

Following Jamie's funeral, Robert tries pressuring Lina to sell the mansion so they can live elsewhere. She resists due to her promise to Katherine and realises his true intentions. Robert reveals that he has Lina's journal, in which she had written fantasies about killing Jamie. Robert insinuates that Lina could be blamed for Jamie's death. After a brief struggle, Lina runs home to find Katherine, only to discover that she and Robert have also been having an affair. She decides to leave but is chased out of the house by Robert, along with Katherine. While fleeing, Lina sees Katherine raise a rifle and aim it in her direction.

As Katherine gradually recovers, Nicky teaches her to communicate by responding to letters of the alphabet by blinking. Nicky is shocked when Katherine spells out the word "murder". When Lina learns of this, she persuades Robert to help her take Katherine home, believing that Katherine will implicate them both in Jamie’s death.

Nicky follows them and reveals to Lina by text and phone call that Katherine was actually trying to protect her from Robert. In a more detailed flashback from the night of the accident, we see Katherine shoot Robert's tire as he tries to run Lina down, having second thoughts about hurting her. Later, after Katherine begs him to let Lina go, Robert purposefully runs over Katherine with his car.

Lina tricks Robert and injects him with a lethal drug he has prepared for Katherine, but it is not strong enough to kill him. Robert attacks Lina and attempts to kill Katherine with another injection. However, Lina manages to stab Robert to death.

The police later arrive at the mansion and collect Robert's body as Lina, Katherine, and Nicky watch. Lina asks Nicky what she will tell them, but Nicky remains silent. Lina and Katherine hold hands.

== Cast ==
- Famke Janssen as Katherine
- Rose Williams as Lina
- Alex Hassell as Doctor Robert Lawrence
- Finn Cole as Jamie
- Anna Friel as Nicky

== Production ==
Nicky Bentham produced for Neon Films, with Alison Jackson executive producing for Gaumont. It is the feature length debut of director Nour Wazzi who worked from a script by Rowan Joffé. In December 2022, Finn Cole, Famke Janssen and Rose Williams were confirmed in the lead roles with Alex Hassell and Anna Friel also in the cast.

Principal photography took place in London in late 2022. In early 2023, filming also took place in St Albans, including at St Albans Cathedral.

== Release ==
Locked In was released on 1 November 2023 through the streaming service Netflix.

== Reception ==
On the review aggregator website Rotten Tomatoes, 33% of 6 critics' reviews are positive, with an average rating of 4.1/10.
