= The Power (2021 British film) =

2021 British film starring Rose Williams

- Promotional poster for the film
- Directed by: Corinna Faith
- Written by: Corinna Faith
- Produced by: Rob Watson & Matthew James Wilkinson
- Starring: Rose Williams; Emma Rigby
- Cinematography: Laura Bellingham
- Edited by: Tommy Boulding & Rebecca Lloyd
- Music by: Elizabeth Bernholz & Max de Wardener
- Production companies: Air Street Films & Stigma Films
- Distributed by: Shudder
- Release date: 8 April 2021
- Running time: 92 minutes
- Country: United Kingdom
- Language: English

The Power is a 2021 British horror film written and directed by Corinna Faith and starring Rose Williams, Emma Rigby, Shakira Rahman, Charlie Carrick and Diveen Henry.

== Plot ==
In early 1970s London, a nurse in training spends her first night at the East London Royal Infirmary during power outages caused by a miners' strike. In the near-total darkness of the old hospital, she is haunted by a supernatural presence, and by her own troubled past growing up in an orphanage.

== Cast ==
- Rose Williams as Valerie / Val
- Emma Rigby as Babara / Babs
- Diveen Henry as Matron
- Charlie Carrick as Franklyn
- Shakira Rahman as Saba
- Gbemisola Ikumelo as Comfort
- Theo Barklem-Biggs as Neville

== Release ==
The Power was released on streaming service Shudder on April 8, 2021, in North America, the UK, Ireland, Australia and New Zealand.

== Reception ==
On review aggregator Rotten Tomatoes, the film holds an approval rating of 84% based on 55 reviews. The website's critics consensus reads: "A supernatural horror story grounded in real-world trauma, The Power marks writer-director Corinna Faith as an emerging talent to watch." Metacritic, which uses a weighted average, assigned the film a score of 60 out of 100, based on 10 critics, indicating "mixed or average" reviews.

Williams' performance in the film received praise. Simon Abrams for RogerEbert.com gave a mostly negative review, writing "Val needs to be more than just a generic symbol of right-minded martyrdom, and she’s never allowed to become more than that. The circumstances of her suffering are too slight to register, making it hard to feel anything for Val beyond a general sympathy."
