= The Baby (TV series) =

British horror comedy limited series

- Promotional poster
- Genre: Horror comedy
- Created by: Lucy Gaymer; Siân Robins-Grace
- Starring: Michelle de Swarte; Amira Ghazalla; Amber Grappy; Albie Hills; Arthur Hills
- Composer: Lucrecia Dalt
- Country of origin: United Kingdom
- Original language: English
- No. of episodes: 8

Production
- Executive producers: Naomi de Pear; Jane Featherstone; Carolyn Strauss; Siân Robins-Grace; Nicole Kassell
- Producer: Lucy Gaymer
- Production location: United Kingdom
- Cinematography: Kate Reid; Ben Wheeler; Diana Olifirova
- Editors: Gary Dollner; Mike Holliday; Adam Biskupski; Jo Walker
- Running time: 23–34 minutes
- Production companies: Sister; Sky Studios; Proverbial Pictures

Original release
- Network: Sky Atlantic; HBO
- Release: 24 April – 12 June 2022

The Baby is a British horror comedy television limited series created by Lucy Gaymer and Siân Robins-Grace, which premiered on HBO on 24 April 2022 and Sky Atlantic on 7 July 2022. The series consists of eight episodes.

== Premise ==
When 38-year-old Natasha is unexpectedly landed with a baby, her life of doing what she wants, when she wants, dramatically implodes. Stinky, controlling, manipulative and with violent powers, the baby twists Natasha's life into a horror show. Where does it come from? What does it want? And to what lengths will Natasha have to go in order to get her life back? She doesn't want a baby. The baby wants her.

== Cast and characters ==
=== Main ===
- Michelle de Swarte as Natasha Willams: A 38-year-old who has never made long-term plans and is unexpectedly landed with a baby.
- Amira Ghazalla as Mrs. Eaves/Nour: The 73-year-old "Enigma" who has spent 50 years living in her car.
- Amber Grappy as Bobbi Willams: Natasha's younger sister, who wants nothing more than to be a parent.
- Albie Hills and Arthur Hills as ‘The Baby’ that turns Natasha's world upside down.

=== Recurring ===
- Patrice Naiambana as Natasha's father, Lyle
- Sinéad Cusack as Natasha's mother, Barbara
- Shvorne Marks as Mags
- Isy Suttie as Rita
- Tanya Reynolds as Helen
- Seyan Sarvan as Nour
- Karl Davies as Jack
- Divian Ladwa as Fooze
- Angela Yeoh as Yolanda

== Episodes ==
No.	Title	Directed by	Written by	Original release date	U.S. viewers (millions)
1	"The Arrival"	Nicole Kassell	Siân Robins-Grace	24 April 2022	0.116
2	"The Seduction"	Stacey Gregg	Siân Robins-Grace	1 May 2022	0.130
3	"The Bulldozer"	Stacey Gregg	Sophie Goodhart	8 May 2022	0.170
4	"The Mother"	Faraz Shariat	Susan Soon He Stanton	15 May 2022	0.132
5	"The Baby"	Faraz Shariat	Kara Smith	22 May 2022	0.115
6	"The Rage"	Faraz Shariat	Anchuli Felicia King	29 May 2022	0.091
7	"The Curse"	Ella Jones	Siân Robins-Grace and Sophie Goodhart	5 June 2022	0.087
8	"The Possession"	Ella Jones	Siân Robins-Grace and Anchuli Felicia King	12 June 2022	0.093

== Production ==
=== Development ===
In August 2020, it was announced HBO had given a series order to The Baby. Robins-Grace, Jane Featherstone, Carolyn Strauss, and Naomi de Pear were confirmed as executive producers with Lucy Gaymer producing. The Baby is produced by HBO, Sky Atlantic, Sister, and Gaymer's Proverbial Pictures. Nicole Kassell joined in December 2020 as a lead director and executive producer. Stacey Gregg, Faraz Shariat and Elle Jones also serve as directors.

Sophie Goodhart, Kara Smith, Anchuli Felicia King and Susan Stanton serve as writers on the series. Bisha K. Ali serves as a consulting producer.

=== Casting ===
In June 2021, Michelle de Swarte was cast as Natasha, while Amira Ghazalla was cast as Mrs. Eaves and Amber Grappy as Bobbi. In February 2022, Patrice Naiambana, Sinéad Cusack, Shvorne Marks, Isy Suttie, Tanya Reynolds, Seyan Sarvan, Karl Davies, and Divian Ladwa joined the series.

=== Filming ===
Filming began on 31 May 2021 in the United Kingdom. The series wrapped in November 2021.

=== Music ===
Lucrecia Dalt serves as the series' composer. Pete Saville and Zoe Bryant are the music supervisors, and Ed Hamilton is the music editor.

== Release ==
The Baby premiered on HBO on 24 April 2022 and consist of eight episodes.

== Reception ==
=== Critical response ===
The review aggregator website Rotten Tomatoes reported an 72% approval rating with an average rating of 7/10, based on 32 critic reviews. The website's critics consensus reads, "The Baby's tone can be as wobbly as a rocking crib, but its audacious nature of comedy and horror deserves to be nurtured." Metacritic, which uses a weighted average, assigned a score of 71 out of 100 based on 9 critics, indicating "generally favorable reviews".

=== Viewership ratings ===
Viewership and ratings per episode of The Baby
No.	Title	Air date	Rating (18–49)	Viewers (millions)	DVR (18–49)	DVR viewers (millions)	Total (18–49)	Total viewers (millions)
1	"The Arrival"	24 April 2022	0.02	0.116	TBD	TBD	TBD	TBD
2	"The Seduction"	1 May 2022	0.02	0.130	TBD	TBD	TBD	TBD
3	"The Bulldozer"	8 May 2022	0.04	0.170	TBD	TBD	TBD	TBD
4	"The Mother"	15 May 2022	0.02	0.132	TBD	TBD	TBD	TBD
5	"The Baby"	22 May 2022	0.01	0.115	TBD	TBD	TBD	TBD
6	"The Rage"	29 May 2022	0.01	0.091	TBD	TBD	TBD	TBD
7	"The Curse"	5 June 2022	0.01	0.087	TBD	TBD	TBD	TBD
8	"The Possession"	12 June 2022	0.01	0.093	TBD	TBD	TBD	TBD
