= 8 Minutes Idle =

British independent dramedy film

- DVD cover
- Directed by: Mark Simon Hewis
- Written by: Matt Thorne; Nicholas Blincoe
- Based on: Eight Minutes Idle by Matt Thorne
- Starring: Paul Kaye; Ophelia Lovibond; Antonia Thomas; Tom Hughes; Pippa Haywood; Jack Ashton; Montserrat Lombard; Divian Ladwa; Robert Wilfort
- Release date: 2014
- Running time: 86 minutes
- Country: England
- Language: English

8 Minutes Idle is an independent British film released in 2014 based on the book Eight Minutes Idle by Matt Thorne. It is billed as an offbeat comedy drama where a young man is thrown out of his home and sleeps in the office of his call-centre job while pining after his coworker.

== Plot ==
Dan (Tom Hughes) is working in a Bristol call centre when he is kicked out of his home by his angry mother (Pippa Haywood) after he let his father (Paul Kaye) in, who subsequently stole her winning lottery ticket. He is told by his icy boss Alice (Montserrat Lombard) that he should step into team leader shoes and part of that is picking someone to fire or be fired himself. He is then told that his father has been in a hit and run (suspected to be his mother) and visits him in hospital.

He moves into the office with his cat, John. The morning after, his coworker Ade (Antonia Thomas) deduces that he is sleeping in the office and lends him money to find somewhere to stay, which he instead uses to buy a replacement iPod. He asks around for someone to stay with including the coworker he has a crush on, Teri (Ophelia Lovibond), all of whom prove unsuitable or unable to put him up, so he remains sleeping at the office.

Alice increases the pressure on Dan to pick someone to fire and says it should be Teri. His mother confronts him to find the location of his father (and lottery ticket); coworker Ian (Jack Ashton) confronts him about the money Ade lent him and he is accosted in the office one night by Alice who comes onto him and the two have sex.

Alice calls a team meeting where she abruptly fires Teri for being late to work after Dan had failed to fire her before. At another work social, Teri reveals that she made up her boyfriend Jake. Dan then reveals his living situation to Teri who helps him retrieve John the cat from the ceiling (now unfortunately dead). While Teri is in the ceiling Alice arrives at the office for Dan resulting in a confrontation.

The call centre company then folds and at the final karaoke social Alice knocks Teri out with a bottle, Dan rushes her to hospital where he sees his father leaving with his mother, having gotten back together for the lottery money. Teri recovers and Dan invites her to live with him in the now-empty office as she has been kicked out of her houseshare in the meantime.

== Cast and crew ==
=== Cast ===
- Paul Kaye as Steve (Dan's father)
- Ophelia Lovibond as Teri
- Antonia Thomas as Adrienne (Ade)
- Tom Hughes as Dan
- Pippa Haywood as Kathy (Dan's mother)
- Jack Ashton as Ian
- Montserrat Lombard as Alice
- Divian Ladwa as Dev
- Robert Wilfort as Bryan

=== Crew ===
- Writers: Nicholas Blincoe, Matt Thorne
- Director: Mark Simon Hewis
- Producer: Sarah Cox
- Cinematography: Sarah Bartles-Smith
- Editor: Victoria Stevens

== Production ==
=== Writing ===
The author of the book of the same name co-wrote the screenplay said that the idea for the ending came from the director and differs from the novel.

=== Filming ===
The production crew created a fake call centre as previous offices the writer had worked in no longer existed. Filming took place in 2010 in The Bottle Yard Studios and around Bristol.

=== Music ===
The film features several tracks by Kid Carpet, including Special, Doing a Poo in the Forest and Last Word.

== Reception ==
The film has received mixed reviews, earning 2/5 starts from The Guardian and the Evening Standard, 38% on Rotten Tomatoes and a slightly more positive 3/5 from the Radio Times.
