= The Laureate =

- Film poster
- Directed by: William Nunez
- Written by: William Nunez
- Produced by: William Nunez; Christian Parton
- Starring: Tom Hughes; Dianna Agron; Laura Haddock; Fra Fee; Patricia Hodge; Julian Glover
- Cinematography: Adam Barnett
- Music by: Brian Byrne
- Production companies: NorthEnd Pictures; Cool Web Pictures
- Distributed by: Creative Artists Agency (US) Metro International
- Release date: November 2, 2021 (Mallorca)
- Running time: 109 minutes
- Country: United Kingdom
- Language: English

The Laureate is a 2021 biographical romantic drama film written and directed by William Nunez. It stars Tom Hughes, Laura Haddock, and Dianna Agron. The film depicts the life of British war poet and novelist Robert Graves. The film premiered at the 2021 Mallorca Film Festival. The film won Film of the Festival at the 2021 Oxford International Film Awards as well as Best Feature, Best Director (William Nunez) and Best Actor (Tom Hughes).

== Cast ==
- Tom Hughes as Robert Graves
- Laura Haddock as Nancy Nicholson
- Dianna Agron as Laura Riding
- Julian Glover as Alfred Graves
- Patricia Hodge as Amy Graves
- Indica Watson as Catherine Nicholson
- Christien Anholt as T. S. Eliot
- Fra Fee as Geoffrey Phibbs

== Production ==
In February 2018, Kathy Bates was attached to the production with Tom Hughes, Dianna Agron and Laura Haddock already cast. Hayley Atwell and Dominic Cooper were also attached the production, but dropped out due to scheduling conflicts.
