= Timmy Failure (book series) =

Kid's book series

- Cover for the first edition of the original book, Timmy Failure: Mistakes Were Made
- Author: Stephan Pastis
- Illustrator: Stephan Pastis
- Country: United States
- Language: English
- Genre: Children's literature, Comedy
- Publisher: Candlewick Press
- Published: 2013–2020
- Media type: Print (hardback and paperback)
- No. of books: 8
- Website: Official website

The book series Timmy Failure is an American authored and illustrated by cartoonist Stephan Pastis. It was originally published by Candlewick Press from 2013 to 2018, with Disney Hyperion releasing a prequel in 2020. The series chronicles the misadventures of a clueless and arrogant child detective, the eponymous Timmy Failure, who lives with his mother and is often accompanied by his pet polar bear, Total.

== Synopsis ==
The series chronicles the life of a child detective, the eponymous Timmy Failure, who lives with his mother and is often accompanied by his pet polar bear, Total. The boy and the bear make up the detective agency "Total Failure Inc." The series mainly covers the misadventures of Failure, who is constantly getting into trouble with the school and with his mother. Side characters include Failure's best friend Rollo and his "nemesis", Corrina Corrina.

== Background and release ==
Timmy Failure is authored and illustrated by cartoonist Stephan Pastis, creator of the comic strip Pearls Before Swine. Pastis has described Timmy as "clueless and arrogant, though bearable given his family situation." The origin of the character Timmy Failure was a character from a rejected comic strip called Bradbury Road. When discussing the impact of his daily comic strip on his writing style in the book series, Pastis noted that the "forced economy" of a short comic strip caused him to realize the value of words, which helped him in crafting the stories in the series. The original seven books were published by Candlewick Press from 2013 to 2018. A prequel, Zero to Hero, was published by Disney Hyperion in 2020.

=== Film ===
A film inspired by the first installment of the series, Mistakes Were Made, was produced by Walt Disney Pictures and released on Disney+ in 2020. Tom McCarthy directed the feature and co-wrote it with Pastis and Benjamin Pestana. The cast included Winslow Fegley as Timmy Failure, Ophelia Lovibond, Craig Robinson and Wallace Shawn.

== Books in the series ==
There are eight books in the Timmy Failure series:

1. Timmy Failure: Mistakes Were Made (2013)
2. Timmy Failure: Now Look What You've Done (2014)
3. Timmy Failure: We Meet Again (2014)
4. Timmy Failure: Sanitized for Your Protection (2015)
5. Timmy Failure: The Book You're Not Supposed to Have (2016)
6. Timmy Failure: That Cat Stole My Pants (2017)
7. Timmy Failure: It's the End When I Say It's the End (2018)
8. Timmy Failure: Zero to Hero (2020)
