= Spider Island (film) =

2026 British comedy horror film

- Theatrical release poster
- Directed by: Christopher Smith
- Screenplay by: David Quantick; Cristopher Jolley
- Produced by: Ben Jacques; Michael Knowles; James Richardson; Allan Niblo
- Starring: Rose Williams; Tim McInnerny; Avani Gregg; Owen Warner; Andy Nyman; Justin Daniels Anene; Abraham Lewis; Divian Ladwa
- Cinematography: Narayan Van Maele ISC
- Production company: Vertigo Films
- Release date: 28 August 2026
- Running time: 95 minutes
- Country: United Kingdom
- Language: English

Spider Island is a 2026 British comedy horror film directed by Christopher Smith and written by Christopher Jolley and David Quantick. It is produced by Vertigo Films and has an ensemble cast featuring Rose Williams, Tim McInnerny, Avani Gregg, Owen Warner, Andy Nyman and Divian Ladwa.

== Plot ==
An infestation of deadly spiders plague a group of influencers at the launch of a new tropical holiday resort.

== Cast ==
- Rose Williams
- Tim McInnerny
- Avani Gregg
- Owen Warner
- Andy Nyman
- Lena Mahfouf
- Divian Ladwa
- Abraham Lewis
- Carlotta Banat
- Justin Daniels Anene
- Anuschka Van Lent
- Jake Francois

== Production ==
The film is directed by Christopher Smith from a script by David Quantick and Christopher Jolley and produced by Vertigo Films.

The cast includes Rose Williams, Tim McInnerny, Avani Gregg, Owen Warner, and Andy Nyman as well as Lena Mahfouf, Carlotta Banat, Jake Francois and Anuschka Van Lent.

Principal photography took place in Mauritius in April 2025.

== Release ==
The film was released theatrically in the United States on 28 August 2026. The film was shown at FrightFest film festival in London on 30 August 2026.
