= Finn Cole =

English actor (born 1995)

- Cole in 2026
- Born: Finlay Lewis Cole; 9 November 1995 (age 31); London, England
- Education: Esher College
- Occupation: Actor
- Years active: 2012–present
- Partner: Florence Pugh (2026-present)
- Relatives: Joe Cole (brother)

Finlay Lewis Cole (born 9 November 1995) is an English actor. He is known for his role as Michael Gray in the BBC series Peaky Blinders (2014–2022). He also starred as Joshua "J" Cody in TNT's Animal Kingdom (2016–2022) and played young Jakob Toretto in the film F9 (2021).

== Early life ==
Cole was raised in London and is the fourth of five brothers. As a child, Cole wanted to work on boats like his father. His eldest brother, Joe Cole, helped Cole get the audition for his first acting job: Michael Gray in Peaky Blinders, a BBC drama in which Joe also starred.

== Career ==
In 2014, Cole was cast in the crime drama series Peaky Blinders, where he played a main role.

In 2015, Cole appeared as Eric Birling in Helen Edmundson's BBC One adaptation of An Inspector Calls. Also that year, Cole had a guest appearance in the detective drama series Lewis.

From 2016 to 2022, Cole played the main role of Joshua "J" Cody in the American drama television series Animal Kingdom, which aired on TNT.

His films include the comedy horror Slaughterhouse Rulez (2018), the period thriller Dreamland (2019), and the drama Here Are the Young Men (2020).

In 2021, Cole appeared as a young Jakob Toretto in F9. He appeared as Jamie in the 2023 psychological thriller Netflix film Locked In.

In 2024, Cole made his stage debut in Red Speedo by Lucas Hnath at Orange Tree Theatre.

In 2025, Cole starred in the film Last Breath.

== Filmography ==
=== Film ===
Year	Title	Role	Notes
2012	Offender	Riot Boy	Extra
2018	Slaughterhouse Rulez	Don Wallace	
2019	Dreamland	Eugene Evans	
2020	Here Are the Young Men	Joseph Kearney	
2021	F9	Jakob Toretto (young)	
2023	Locked In	Jamie	
2025	Last Breath	Chris Lemons	
2026	In The Shadows	Richard Moore	Biopic
2027	Sirius	Samuel	
TBA	Gable	Dan Gable	Biopic

=== Television ===
Year	Title	Role	Notes
2014–2022	Peaky Blinders	Michael Gray	Main cast
2015	An Inspector Calls	Eric Birling	Television film
2015	Lewis	Ollie Tedman	2 episodes
2016–2022	Animal Kingdom	Joshua "J" Cody	Main cast

== Theatre ==
Year	Title	Role	Theatre	Notes
2024	Red Speedo	Ray	Orange Tree theatre, London	Stage debut
