= Jeff Povey =

Scottish author, screenwriter and director

- Born: Bridge of Allan
- Occupations: screenwriter, author
- Years active: 1993–present
- Known for: EastEnders; By Any Means; Hooten and the Lady

Jeff Povey is a Scottish screenwriter and author, best known for his extensive work in British television.

== Career ==
After his two-man play Tidy, Povey started writing television since the early 1990s, with Stay Lucky. He has written multiple episodes of long-running drama series, such as Casualty, its spinoff Holby City, and 240 episodes of EastEnders. Povey's final written episode of EastEnders broadcast on 9 February 2024, with Povey announcing his retirement from the series.

Other television series, covering a wide array of genres, he wrote for include children's drama The Dumping Ground, reboots like The Musketeers and Minder, comedies like Kingdom, and various crime series such as Silent Witness, Midsomer Murders, The Good Ship Murder, and Cooper and Fry. Povey also co-created two series, By Any Means and Hooten and the Lady.

Outside of screenwriting, Povey directed the short film Blowing It in 2002. His first novel, The Serial Killers Club, was published in 2006. In 2014 his second novel, SHIFT, was published. The second book in the trilogy, DELETE, was published on 23 April 2015. On 23 March 2017, the final book titled ESCAPE was released, concluding the trilogy.
