= Christopher Smith (director) =

British film director and screenwriter

- Born: 1 July 1972 (age 54); Bristol, England
- Occupations: film director screenwriter

Christopher Smith (born 1 July 1972) is a British film director and screenwriter. His four most prominent pieces of work are Creep, Severance, Triangle and Black Death.

== Filmography ==
Short film

Year	Title	Director	Writer
1997	The 10000th Day	Yes	Yes
1998	The Day Grandad Went Blind	Yes	Yes

Feature film

Year	Title	Director	Writer
2004	Creep	Yes	Yes
2006	Severance	Yes	Yes
2009	Triangle	Yes	Yes
2010	Black Death	Yes	No
2014	Get Santa	Yes	Yes
2016	Detour	Yes	Yes
2020	The Banishing	Yes	No
2023	Consecration	Yes	Yes
2026	Spider Island	Yes	No

Television

Year	Title	Director	Writer	Executive producer
2012	Labyrinth	Yes	No	No
2013–14	Crossing Lines	No	Yes	No
2017	Riviera	No	Yes	No
2019	Curfew	Yes	No	No
2020	Alex Rider	Yes	No	No
2021	Temple	No	No	Yes
2023	Spy/Master	Yes	No	No
2024	The Montaners	No	No	Yes
2025	Video Nasty	Yes	No	No
