= Ophelia Lovibond =

English actress (born 1986)

- Born: Ophelia Lucy Lovibond; 19 February 1986 (age 40); Hammersmith, London, England
- Education: University of Sussex
- Occupation: Actress
- Years active: 1999–present
- Spouse: Henry Pettigrew (m. 2022)
- Children: 1

Ophelia Lucy Lovibond (born 19 February 1986) is an English actress. She is known for her roles as Carina in the films Thor: The Dark World and Guardians of the Galaxy, Izzy Gould in the BBC's W1A, Patty Failure in Disney's Timmy Failure: Mistakes Were Made, Joyce Prigger in HBO Max/Starz's Minx, and Kitty Winter in CBS's Elementary.

== Early life and education ==
Lovibond grew up in Shepherd's Bush, London in a single-parent household with two siblings, a brother and a sister, and various children fostered by her mother who worked as a chartered psychologist at Wormwood Scrubs Prison. She realized that she wanted to be an actor around the age of 10 years old. She attended Latymer Upper School on a scholarship, and graduated from the University of Sussex with a degree in English Literature in 2008. "I never wanted to go to drama school," Lovibond told The Independent in 2015, "The teaching at Latymer was so inspirational I just thought I don't want to stop, I just want to read and learn."

Lovibond was part of the Young Blood youth theatre group in Hammersmith which counts Imogen Poots, Oliver Jackson-Cohen, and Carey Mulligan among its alumni.

== Career ==
=== Television ===
In 2000, Lovibond made her television debut at the age of 12 in the Channel 4 sitcom The Wilsons. She lied about her age to be cast as Poppy Wilson opposite David Bradley in the show. "I did [the show] in front of a live studio audience and it was really being thrown in at the deep end which was probably a good thing," she said, "I didn't have any professional training at all. I didn't go to drama school or anything like that, so this was a truly invaluable experience of learning how to work in this profession."

She appeared in Elliot Hegarty’s FM and the British period drama Heartbeat. She also played Izzy Gould in the BBC satire W1A.

In 2014, Lovibond joined the cast of Elementary as Sherlock's new apprentice, Kitty Winter. The show's creator, Robert Doherty, contacted her agent in Los Angeles, California about the role, and later requested she share an audition self-tape. "I did the tape at home with my mum on Wednesday and was offered [the role] on Thursday and then after eight days I flew to New York for five months," she recalled. Lovibond described her time in New York as "straight out of Breakfast at Tiffany's with jazz floating in off Washington Square Park and eccentric Greenwich Village neighbours." In addition to being a season three regular on the show, she also had guest appearances in seasons five and seven.

Lovibond appeared in the first episode, "Sardines", of the British black comedy anthology series Inside No. 9 (2014–24). In 2016, she played the role of Lady Alexandra Lindo-Parker in Sky1 series Hooten & The Lady. She appeared in a guest role in the 2019 series Whiskey Cavalier as MI6 agent Emma Davies. Between 2020 and 2022 she played Erica in the BBC/Apple TV series Trying. On 16 September 2020, Lovibond was announced as the lead in HBO Max’s period-comedy Minx. In 2022, she played Carrie Symonds in the TV series This England.

=== Film ===
Lovibond made her film debut in Roman Polanski's Oliver Twist in 2005. She had a part in the John Lennon biopic Nowhere Boy. She played a leading role in the film 4.3.2.1, and had roles in the 2011 films London Boulevard, No Strings Attached and Mr. Popper's Penguins. Lovibond played Teri in the BFI/BBC film based on the award-winning novel, 8 Minutes Idle, and Carina, The Collector's slave, in the 2014 film Guardians of the Galaxy.

=== Radio ===
Lovibond played the character Sam Peakes in series 1 of Lobby Land on BBC Radio 4 (broadcast June 2018).

=== Theatre ===
In 2015, Lovibond made her professional stage debut in the revival of Lucy Prebble's The Effect, directed by Daniel Evans. The following year, she appeared as Elizabeth Barry in Stephen Jeffreys' The Libertine at London's Theatre Royal Haymarket.

In 2017, she played Lois, the eponymous character, in Githa Sowerby's The Stepmother. She played Lou in Barney Norris’s 2018 play Nightfall and starred in the revival of David Hare's The Bay at Nice.

In January 2024, Lovibond starred in Jez Butterworth's The Hills of California which premiered at the Harold Pinter Theatre in London's West End and was later transferred to the Broadhurst Theatre on Broadway.

=== Others ===
Lovibond appeared in Gabrielle Aplin's February 2013 music video "Please Don't Say You Love Me".

== Personal life ==
Lovibond previously lived with actor Tom Hughes in Hampstead, London.

She married actor Henry Pettigrew on 1 May 2022. The couple met while starring in The Effect. She gave birth to their first child in December 2025.

== Acting credits ==
=== Film ===
Year	Title	Role	Notes
2005	Oliver Twist	Bet	
2006	Crusade in Jeans	Isabella	
2007	Popcorn	Katerina	
2009	Bottle	Sam	Short film
2009	Shadows in the Sun	Kate	
2009	Nowhere Boy	Marie	
2010	Chatroom	Charlotte	
2010	4.3.2.1.	Shannon	
2010	London Boulevard	Penny	
2011	No Strings Attached	Vanessa	
2011	Turnout	Sophie	
2011	Mr. Popper's Penguins	Pippi Pepenopolis	
2012	8 Minutes Idle	Teri	
2012	The Poison Tree	Biba Capel	
2013	A Single Shot	Abbie	
2013	Thor: The Dark World	Carina	Cameo
2014	Guardians of the Galaxy	Carina	
2015	Man Up	Jessica	
2016	Tommy's Honour	Meg Drinnen	
2016	The Autopsy of Jane Doe	Emma	
2016	Gozo	Lucille	
2019	Rocketman	Arabella	
2020	Timmy Failure: Mistakes Were Made	Patty Failure	
2024	Here	Stella Beekman	
TBA	Real Love (Yes, It's Real Love!)	Stacey	Post-production

=== Television ===
Year	Title	Role	Notes
2000	The Wilsons	Poppy Wilson	6 episodes
2003	Single	Rachel Barton	6 episodes
2003	The Bill	Carly Flint	"Antecedent", "Fatality"
2003	Loving You	Alice	Television film
2005	Casualty	Jude Greer	Episode: "Running out of Kisses"
2005	Nathan Barley	Mandy	Episode #1.5
2006–2007	Holby City	Jade McGuire	Recurring role, 9 episodes
2007	The Bill	Serena Black	Episode: "A Model Murder: Part 1"
2007	Heartbeat	Charlie Prentice	Episode: "Heirs Apparent"
2008	Messiah: The Rapture	Lucy Waite	Miniseries, 2 episodes
2008	Delta Forever	Roxy	Episode: "Pilot"
2009	Lewis	Jessica Rattenbury	Episode: "The Point of Vanishing"
2009	FM	Daisy	Main role, 6 episodes
2012	Titanic: Blood & Steel	Kitty Carlton	Main role, 12 episodes
2012	The Poison Tree	Biba Capel	TV miniseries, 2 episodes
2014	Inside No. 9	Rachel	Episode: "Sardines"
2014	Mr. Sloane	Robin	Main role, 6 episodes
2014–2017	W1A	Izzy Gould	Main role, 14 episodes
2014–2019	Elementary	Katheryn "Kitty" Winter	Recurring role, 15 episodes
2016	Hooten & the Lady	Lady Alexandra Lindo-Parker	Lead role, 8 episodes
2019	Whiskey Cavalier	Emma Davies	4 episodes
2020	Feel Good	Binky	5 episodes
2020	Roadkill	Susan Laurence	Episode: #1.3
2020–2022	Trying	Erica	Main role (seasons 1 and 2)
2021	What If...?	Carina (voice)	Episode: "What If... T'Challa Became a Star-Lord?"
2022	This England	Carrie Symonds	Main role, 5 episodes
2022–2023	Minx	Joyce Prigger	Lead role
2023	Partygate	Annabel D'acre	Television film
2026	The Lady	Aleksandra	3 episodes
2026	MobLand	Kavanagh	Main role

=== Music videos ===
Year	Artist	Title	Notes
2013	Gabrielle Aplin	"Please Don't Say You Love Me"	

=== Theatre ===
Year	Title	Role	Details	Notes
2015	The Effect	Connie	Sheffield Crucible	
2016	The Libertine	Elizabeth Barry	Theatre Royal Haymarket	
2017	The Stepmother	Lois Relph	Chichester Festival Theatre	
2018	Nightfall	Lou	Bridge Theatre	
2019	The Bay at Nice	Sophia	Menier Chocolate Factory	
2024	The Hills of California	Ruby Webb	Harold Pinter Theatre; Broadhurst Theatre	
