= Rose Williams (actress) =

English actress (born 1994)

- Born: Rose Victoria Williams; 18 February 1994 (age 32); Ealing, London, England
- Occupation: Actor
- Years active: 2014–present
- Known for: Reign, Sanditon

Rose Victoria Williams (born 18 February 1994) is an English actress from Ealing, London. Her television roles include Princess Claude in Reign (2014–2017) and as Charlotte Heywood in Sanditon (2019–2023).

== Early life and education ==
Williams was born in Ealing, West London on 18 February 1994. Her mother worked as a costume designer and her father as a gardener.

Her first job was at a clothing store in Dover Street Market when she was 17 years old. She studied fashion and decided at the age of 18 to pursue acting.

== Career ==
On television, Williams had an early role in long-running British medical drama series Casualty. Her role as Claude of Valois in Reign (2014–2017) required her to be based in Toronto, Canada, for three years. She later appeared in the renaissance Florence historical drama series Medici as well as Curfew (both 2019). That year, Williams began to play the lead role of Charlotte Heywood in Andrew Davies adaptation of Sanditon, the unfinished novel by Jane Austen (2019–2023). She was named a Screen Daily 'Star of Tomorrow' in 2019.

In films, Williams appeared in Changeland (2019), with Seth Green and Macaulay Culkin. Williams had the lead role in British horror film The Power, also starring Emma Rigby, about a nurse in 1970’s London. Williams also has a supporting role in the film adaptation Mrs. Harris Goes to Paris starring Lesley Manville (2022). Her film credits also include the mystery thriller Locked In (2023) and comedy horror Spider Island (2026). On television, Williams has a role in HBO legal drama War (2026).

== Filmography ==
=== Film ===
Year	Title	Role	Notes
2015	Chicken	Lil	
2016	A Quiet Passion	young Vinnie Dickinson	
2016	Infinite	Lily	Short Movie
2019	Changeland	Emma	
2021	The Power	Valerie / Val	
2022	Mrs. Harris Goes to Paris	Pamela Penrose	
2023	Locked In	Lina	
2026	Spider Island	Clara	
2026	Ebenezer	Molly	

=== Television ===
Year	Title	Role	Notes
2014	Casualty	Imogen Renfrew	Episode: "Unhinged"
2014–2017	Reign	Claude de Valois	Seasons 2-4
2019	Curfew	Faith Palladino	
2019–2023	Sanditon	Charlotte Heywood	Main character
2019	Medici	Caterina Sforza Riario	Season 3
2022	That Dirty Black Bag	Symone	Season 1
2026	War	Flora	Post-production
