= Father Brown (disambiguation) =

Father Brown is a fictional character created by English novelist G. K. Chesterton.

Father Brown may also refer to:

- The Adventures of Father Brown, 1945 American radio series
- Father Brown (film), 1954 British film
- Father Brown (1966 TV series), a West German TV series that aired on ARD
- Father Brown (1974 TV series), 1974 British TV series that aired on ITV
- Father Brown (2013 TV series), 2013 British TV series that airs on the BBC
- Father Brown, Detective, 1934 American film
- Father Brown, main antagonist of the Rush song 2112

== Similar spelling ==
- Father Browne (1880–1960) Jesuit priest and photographer
