= Jack Ashton =

British actor

- Born: Jack Lewis
- Occupation: Actor
- Years active: 2005–present
- Television: Call the Midwife
- Partner: Helen George (2016–2023)
- Children: 2

Jack Ashton is a British actor, best known for playing the Reverend Tom Hereward in the BBC television series, Call the Midwife. He also appears as Lenny Sampson in Waterloo Road. On stage, he has performed in A Streetcar Named Desire at the Donmar Warehouse, and as Guy Haines in Strangers on a Train (UK tour). He starred in the 2017 film Instrument of War, based on the true story of Clair Cline, an American prisoner of war.

== Early life and education ==
He was born Jack Lewis in Clifton, Bristol. His father was a sculptor and artist, while his mother worked in education. His family, including two sisters, lived briefly in Burnham-on-Sea, but settled in Bedminster, Bristol.

He left Bedminster Down School at 16, and studied for a BTEC in performing arts at Filton College. He then attended the Academy of Live and Recorded Arts in London.

A long-time fan of Bristol City football club, he chose his stage name as a tribute to Ashton Gate stadium.

== Career ==
=== Television ===
Ashton starred in Call the Midwife from 2014 to 2018. He joined the hit BBC period drama during its third series, playing Reverend Tom Hereward, a Curate in Poplar who works alongside the nuns and nurses of Nonnatus House.

In 2023, Ashton appeared in the BBC series Waterloo Road as ex-convict Lenny Sampson who is brought in to help fight knife crime among at-risk youth.

Other popular television programmes he has appeared in include Sister Boniface Mysteries, Casualty, Endeavour, McDonald & Dodds, and Broadchurch.

=== Radio ===
Ashton joined the cast of The Archers in 2023, playing Harry Chilcott.

=== Theatre ===
In 2009, Ashton performed in a Donmar Warehouse production of A Streetcar Named Desire as the dead husband of Blanche Dubois, played by Rachel Weisz.

In 2018, he starred in a UK tour of Strangers on a Train, an adaptation of the Patricia Highsmith novel. He played the lead role of Guy Haines, described by The Times as "the classic American good guy, the passionate architect, full of ideals", opposite "spoilt rich boy" Charles Bruno played by Christopher Harper.

=== Film ===
Ashton played the lead role Instrument of War, a 2017 BYUtv film based on the true story of Clair Cline, an American soldier captured by the Nazis who plays a handmade violin he makes out of scrap material he finds in the prisoner-of-war camp. Following a screening at the Heartland Film Festival, Richard Propes of The Independent Critic wrote, "one must give the strongest kudos to Jack Ashton for a performance that captures both the harrowing nature of his surroundings and the seemingly undefeatable human spirit that Cline must've possessed."

== Personal life ==
From 2016 to 2023, Ashton was in a relationship with his on-screen co-star Helen George. In September 2017, their daughter Wren Ivy was born. The couple's second daughter Lark, was born in November 2021. They split up in 2023.

== Filmography ==
=== Film ===
Year	Title	Role	Notes	Ref.
2009	Colin Brumby	Colin Brumby	Short film	
2011	Of Mary	Bryan	Short film	
2014	8 Minutes Idle	Ian		
2016	Donkeys	T	Short film	
2017	Instrument of War	Clair Cline		
2018	Welcome to Curiosity	Sean		
2025	Bad Apples	Eddy's Dad		

=== Television ===
Year	Title	Role	Notes	Ref.
2005	Holby City	Chris Philips	Episode: "More Equal Than Others"	
2007	Silent Witness	James Fetherton	Episode: "Hippocratic Oath, Part 1"	
2008	Four Seasons	Martin	Miniseries; 2 episodes	
2009	Mistresses	Young Man	Episode: "Series 2, Episode 1"	
2010	Dappers	Ryan	Episode: "Proper Job"	
2010	Holby City	Neil Gilligan	Episode: "Man with No Name"	
2012	Endeavour	DC Ian McLeash	Episode: "Pilot"	
2013	Broadchurch	Kevin Green	Episode: "Series 1, Episode 2"	
2014–2018	Call the Midwife	Reverend Tom Hereward	Series regular; 35 episodes	
2015	Vicious	Theo	Episode: "Gym"	
2016	No Man Left Behind	Chris Ryan	Episode: "No Man Left Behind"	
2020	McDonald & Dodds	Jack Valentine	Episode: "The Fall of the House of Crockett"	
2022	U-Boat Wargamers	Karl Dönitz	Series regular; 6 episodes	
2022–2023	Casualty	Angus Knockton	Recurring role; 2 episodes	
2023	Sister Boniface Mysteries	Lewis Garner	Episode: "Stage Fright"	
2023	Waterloo Road	Lenny Sampson	Recurring role; 2 episodes	
2023	The Chelsea Detective	Toby Hansard	Episode: "The Blue Room"	
2024	Professor T.	Adam Bernard	Recurring role; 2 episodes	
2025	Lockerbie: A Search for Truth	Jonathan Dobson	Episode: "Episode 1"	

== Theatre credits ==
Year	Title	Role	Venue	Notes	Ref.
2009	The Homecoming	Joey	York Theatre Royal, York		
2009	Twelfth Night	Sebastian	York Theatre Royal, York		
2009	A Streetcar Named Desire	Young Collector	Donmar Warehouse, London		
2009	Christmas Reloaded	Jase	Old Red Lion Theatre, London	with Papatango Theatre Company	
2010	Leopoldville	Jonah Devlin	Tristan Bates Theatre, London	with Papatango Theatre Company	
2012	The Guinea Pig Club	Hugh Lockhart	York Theatre Royal, York		
2018	Strangers on a Train	Guy Haines	Theatre Royal, Brighton & UK tour	with Ambassador Theatre Group	
2024	Little Women	Professor Friedrich Bhaer / John Brooke	York Theatre Royal, York		
