= Tom Hughes (actor) =

English actor

- Born: 18 April 1985 (age 41); Upton-by-Chester, Cheshire, England, UK
- Education: Royal Academy of Dramatic Art
- Occupation: Actor
- Years active: 2008–present

Thomas Hughes is an English actor. He is notable for his roles as Prince Albert in the ITV drama Victoria (2016–2019), Joe Lambe in the BBC drama The Game (2014), and Thomas Trafford in the BBC and Amazon Prime miniseries The English (2022). His films include Cemetery Junction (2011), Red Joan (2018), The Laureate (2021), Madame (2017), and Shepherd (2021).

== Early life and education ==
Thomas Hughes was born and brought up in Upton-by-Chester, Cheshire, the younger of two boys.

He attended the Liverpool Everyman Youth Theatre group. He was a member of the Cheshire Youth Theatre and the Jigsaw Music Theatre Company. He graduated from the Royal Academy of Dramatic Art (RADA) in 2008 with a Bachelor of Arts in Acting.

Hughes is the former guitarist of indie band Quaintways.

== Career ==
Hughes began his career in 2009 as Dr Harry Ingrams in the BBC spin-off series Casualty 1909 and Jonty Millingden in the ITV drama Trinity. He made his feature film debut the following year as Chaz Jankel in the Ian Dury biopic Sex & Drugs & Rock & Roll, and Bruce Pearson in the comedy-drama Cemetery Junction, the latter of which earned him a BIFA nomination for Most Promising Newcomer. He also appeared in the Young Vic production of David Harrower's Sweet Nothings directed by Luc Bondy.

In 2011, Hughes was named one of BAFTA's 42 Brits to Watch. He played pupil barrister Nick Slade in series 1 of the BBC One legal drama Silk, and appeared in the BBC television film Page Eight alongside Ralph Fiennes and Rachel Weisz. Hughes then appeared in the Richard II instalment of the television anthology The Hollow Crown as Aumerle.

In 2013, he starred in the BFI/BBC film, based on the award-winning novel, 8 Minutes Idle as the lead role Dan Thomas. He made a guest appearance as Michael Rogers in an episode of Agatha Christie's Marple. In 2014, he had a lead role in BBC Cold War spy thriller The Game.

From 2016 to 2019, Hughes starred as Prince Albert opposite Jenna Coleman as the titular character of the ITV period drama Victoria. He starred in the 2019 film Red Joan alongside Judi Dench. In 2019, it was announced Hughes would play the recurring role of Christopher Marlowe in the second series of A Discovery of Witches.

== Filmography ==
=== Film ===
Year	Title	Role	Notes
2010	Sex & Drugs & Rock & Roll	Chaz Jankel	
2010	Cemetery Junction	Bruce Pearson	
2013	About Time	Jimmy Kincade	
2013	8 Minutes Idle	Dan Thomas	
2014	I Am Soldier	Sergeant / Trooper Mickey Tomlinson	
2015	Dare to Be Wild	Christy Collard	
2015	The Incident	Joe	
2016	London Town	Johnny	
2016	Realive	Marc Jarvis	
2017	Madame	Steven Fredericks	
2018	Red Joan	Leo Galich	
2021	Infinite	Abel	
2021	Shepherd	Eric Black	
2021	The Laureate	Robert Graves	

=== Television ===
Year	Title	Role	Notes
2009	Casualty 1909	Dr Harry Ingrams	6 episodes
2009	Trinity	Jonty Millington	8 episodes
2011	Page Eight	Ralph Wilson	Television film
2011	Silk	Nick Slade	6 episodes
2012	Richard II	Aumerle	Television film
2013	The Lady Vanishes	Max	Television film
2013	Dancing on the Edge	Julian	Main role
2013	Agatha Christie's Marple	Michael Rogers	Episode: "Endless Night"
2014	Derek	Andy 'The Fit Guy'	Episode #2.4
2014	The Game	Joe Lambe	Main role
2016	Neil Gaiman's Likely Stories	Eddie Barrow	Episode: "Feeders and Eaters"
2016–2019	Victoria	Prince Albert	Main role
2017	Paula	James Morecroft	Main role
2020	A Discovery of Witches	Kit Marlowe	5 episodes
2022	The English	Thomas Trafford	5 episodes
2024	Franklin	Paul Wentworth	Miniseries, 6 episodes
2024	Those About to Die	Titus Flavianus	10 episodes
2025	Malpractice	Dr James Ford	Series two
2025	The Gold	Logan Campbell	Series two
2026	Legends	Carter	Supporting cast; 5 episodes

== Awards and nominations ==
Year	Award	Category	Work	Result	Ref
2010	British Independent Film Awards	Most Promising Newcomer	Cemetery Junction	Nominated	
2021	Oxford International Film Festival	Best Actor	The Laureate	Won	
