= M3GAN (film series) =

Series of American science fiction horror films

- Official film series logo
- Based on: M3GAN by Akela Cooper & James Wan
- Production companies: Blumhouse Productions; Atomic Monster
- Distributed by: Universal Pictures
- Release dates: January 6, 2023 (M3GAN); June 27, 2025 (M3GAN 2.0); August 1, 2026 (Soulm8te)
- Country: United States
- Language: English
- Budget: $37 million (first 2 films)
- Box office: $220.9 million (first 2 films)

M3GAN (Note: Pronounced "Megan") is an American science fiction horror series, which consists of two theatrical films and one spin-off straight-to-digital film, with a plot that follows a toy company named Funki's development of lifelike companions through robotic androids, and the perilous discovery that the use of artificial intelligence functionality results in unpredictable malevolent results. The first two films have grossed over $220 million worldwide on a combined budget of $37 million.

With Amie Donald providing M3GAN's physical performance and Jenna Davis providing the character's voice, and also starring Allison Williams and Violet McGraw, the series' first installment, M3GAN, in 2023 was met with generally positive reviews. Its financial success resulted in the associated studios fast-tracking the development of both a sequel, M3GAN 2.0 (2025), and a spin-off, Soulm8te (2026).

== Films ==
Film	U.S. release date	Director	Screenwriter(s)	Story by	Producers
M3GAN	January 6, 2023	Gerard Johnstone	Akela Cooper	James Wan & Akela Cooper	James Wan & Jason Blum
M3GAN 2.0	June 27, 2025	Gerard Johnstone	Gerard Johnstone	Akela Cooper & Gerard Johnstone	James Wan, Jason Blum & Allison Williams
Soulm8te	August 1, 2026	Kate Dolan	Kate Dolan & Rafael Jordan	James Wan, Ingrid Bisu & Rafael Jordan	James Wan & Jason Blum

=== M3GAN (2022) ===
Gemma, a robotics engineer with a promising career, has her life turned upside down when she becomes the legal guardian of her newly-orphaned niece named Cady. Unsure of her own parenting abilities and seeking for a companion for Cady, Gemma pairs her niece with a prototype robotic doll enhanced with newly developed lifelike AI technology called M3GAN. As a profound bond between the doll and her niece develops, Gemma presents the observed advances in the project during a presentation at work. Determined to redefine what it means to be a family, Gemma and Cady both begin to discover that the doll's programming is more advanced than expected. M3GAN starts to behave in shockingly unexpected ways, which causes Gemma to question their safety and what its artificial intelligence is capable of.

=== M3GAN 2.0 (2025) ===
In January 2023, Gerard Johnstone confirmed discussions with the associated studios for a sequel movie, while James Wan explained that he has an "idea of where sequels would go". A few weeks later, Universal confirmed a release date and announced the official title as M3GAN 2.0. Akela Cooper returned to write the script and Johnstone also returned to direct. In October 2024 at New York Comic Con, the primary cast (including Allison Williams and Violet McGraw) was confirmed to be reprising their respective roles while primary photography was announced as having been completed. Marketing for the movie began in April 2025 at CinemaCon; the film's first official trailer was released online by the studio.

M3GAN 2.0 was released theatrically on June 27, 2025.

=== Soulm8te (2026) ===
In June 2024, a spin-off film titled Soulm8te was announced as being in development, which was to be directed by Kate Dolan from a script she wrote based on an earlier draft written by Rafael Jordan, from an original story co-authored by James Wan, Ingrid Bisu, and Jordan. The plot centers around a man who acquires a life-like android doll as a coping strategy to overcome the death of his beloved wife. While attempting to enhance the model with true sentience, however, he unintentionally turns the love-machine into a rampaging deadly killer. The movie is described as a technological twist on the erotic thrillers of the 1990s. In August 2024, Lily Sullivan was cast in the lead role as the artificially intelligent android. The project will be a joint-venture production between Universal Pictures, Blumhouse Productions, and Atomic Monster Productions. Later that month, David Rysdahl and Claudia Doumit joined the cast. Principal photography had been completed by November 2024. Marketing for the movie commenced in April 2025 at CinemaCon, where the first official teaser trailer debuted for those in attendance.

Soulm8te was scheduled for theatrical release on January 9, 2026, before being pulled from the release calendar in December 2025, after which Universal began searching for a new distributor. On July 8, 2026, Universal released the film's trailer, revealing that they would still distribute the film but had chosen a straight-to-digital release rather than a theatrical run.

Soulm8te was released on digital platforms on August 1, 2026, by Universal Pictures Home Entertainment.

=== Future ===
In December 2024, Johnstone stated that there were ongoing discussions with all the creatives involved in the first three films to continue with additional installments. The director stated he would like to see a future M3GAN sequel, with the android character among a dystopian future in the style of the Mad Max franchise, acknowledging that one day the concept may be explored in a future story. Allison Williams expressed interest in developing additional spin-offs following the release of SOULM8TE, stating she would like to see each of the installments culminate in a crossover movie. Comparing the idea to a Marvel Cinematic Universe–style movie, the actress asked what the primary antagonist of such a project would be, saying: "What is the Thanos equivalent?"

== Other media ==
=== Video Games ===
A Funko Pop version of a Battle Damanged M3GAN was playable in the game Funko Fusion in 2024.

In June 2025, an event in a Roblox horror-surivial game, PIGGY, was released in a tie-in promotion to the sequel M3GAN 2.0, that freatures the film's character, along with other games from Roblox such as Clip It and Evade. In addition, Roblox also released a "M3GAN’s Lair" integration which allows players to build their own M3GAN using "smart character" tech for the first time.

=== Parodies ===
A season 2 episode of Grimsburg spoofs the franchise with Kiernan Shipka voicing Mo11y in a simliar fashion to M3GAN.

== Recurring cast and characters ==
List indicators

This section includes characters who will appear or have appeared in more than two films in the series.

- An empty grey cell indicates the character was not in the film, or that the character's official presence has not yet been confirmed.
- ^{V} indicates a voice-only role.

Character	Films	
Character	M3GAN	M3GAN 2.0
M3GAN (Note: An acronym which stands for model 3 generative android)	Amie Donald Jenna Davis^{V}	Amie Donald Jenna Davis^{V}
Gemma	Allison Williams	Allison Williams
Cady	Violet McGraw	Violet McGraw
Cole	Brian Jordan Alvarez	Brian Jordan Alvarez
Tess	Jen Van Epps	Jen Van Epps

== Additional production and crew details ==
Film	Crew/detail						
Film	Composer	Cinematographer	Editor	Production companies	Distribution company	Running time	MPA rating
M3GAN	Anthony Willis	Peter McCaffrey	Jeff McEvoy	Blumhouse Productions, Atomic Monster, Divide/Conquer	Universal Pictures	1 hr 42 mins	PG-13
M3GAN 2.0	Chris Bacon	Toby Oliver	Jeff McEvoy	Blumhouse Productions, Atomic Monster, Divide/Conquer	Universal Pictures	2 hrs	PG-13
Soulm8te	Anthony Willis	Narayan Van Maele	John Cutler	Atomic Monster, Blumhouse Productions	Universal Pictures Home Entertainment	1 hr 39 mins	R

== Reception ==
=== Box office and financial performance ===
Film	Box office gross			Box office ranking		Total home video sales	Worldwide total gross income	Budget	Worldwide total net income	Ref.
Film	North America	Other territories	Worldwide	All-time North America	All-time worldwide	Total home video sales	Worldwide total gross income	Budget	Worldwide total net income	Ref.
M3GAN	$95,159,005	$86,637,512	$181,796,517	#863	#1,277	$4,157,585	$184,561,127	$12,000,000	$172,561,127	
M3GAN 2.0	$24,101,280	$14,983,919	$39,085,199	#3,746	#4,545			$25,000,000		
Soulm8te	—N/a	—N/a	—N/a	—N/a	—N/a	—N/a	—N/a	—N/a	—N/a	

=== Critical and public response ===
Film	Rotten Tomatoes	Metacritic	CinemaScore
M3GAN	93% (317 reviews)	72/100 (55 reviews)	B
M3GAN 2.0	58% (235 reviews)	54/100 (42 reviews)	B+
Soulm8te	48% (17 reviews)	40/100 (4 reviews)	—N/a
