= Amie Donald =

New Zealand child actress and dancer (born 2010)

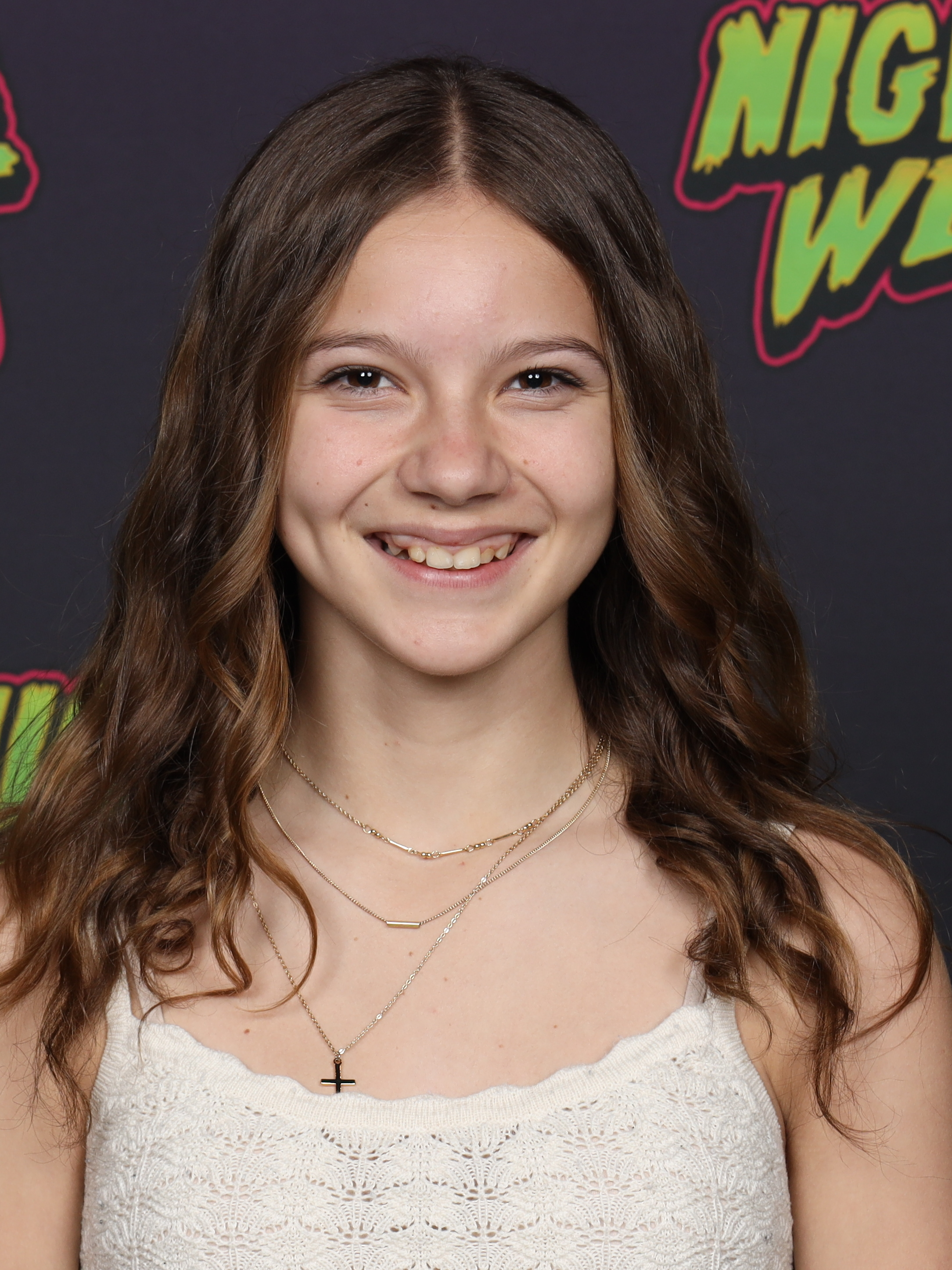
- Donald in 2024
- Born: 28 January 2010 (age 16); New Zealand
- Occupations: Actress; dancer
- Years active: 2021–present

Amie Donald (born 28 January 2010) is a New Zealand child actress and dancer known for starring as the title character in the 2022 horror film M3GAN.

== Career ==
Donald is a dancer who has performed in international competitions. She represented New Zealand at the Dance World Cup in 2019, where she was the first competitor from her country to win medals: a silver and a bronze. She dances at Norris Dance Studios in Papakura. Kylie Norris, her long-term dance teacher and choreographer, developed the M3GAN dance scene with her while filming was done in Auckland.

Donald began her acting career by appearing as Maya Monkey in the Netflix TV series Sweet Tooth in 2021. She is represented by the Bubblegum Talent Agency.

In the 2022 film, M3GAN, Donald starred as the titular character alongside a cast with Allison Williams and fellow child star Violet McGraw. The trailer for M3GAN went viral due to significant coverage regarding Donald's dance moves and physicality as the killer doll in the film. Donald received movement coaching for the film from Jed Brophy and Luke Hawker. The character's voice in the film was provided by actress Jenna Davis.

In the film, Donald "performed her own stunts and co-choreographed the killer dance sequence from the film that went viral on TikTok". Donald also surprised directors by figuring out how to do certain difficult movements on her own, such as a "cobra rise" from the ground without using her arms, and running through the woods on all fours. /Film wrote of Donald's acting that "it's that human performance that really takes the creation from mildly creepy to terrifying... much of M3GAN's physicality came directly from Donald". The Hollywood Reporter noted that Donald and co-star McGraw became close friends during the filming. Donald reprised the role for the 2025 sequel, M3GAN 2.0.

== Personal life ==
Donald lives in Auckland, New Zealand.

== Filmography ==
Television and film roles
Year	Title	Role	Notes	Refs.
2021–2024	Sweet Tooth	Maya Monkey / Wolf Boy #2	TV series	
2022	M3GAN	M3GAN	Film	
2025	M3GAN 2.0	M3GAN	Film	
