= Lily Sullivan =

Australian actress (born 1994)

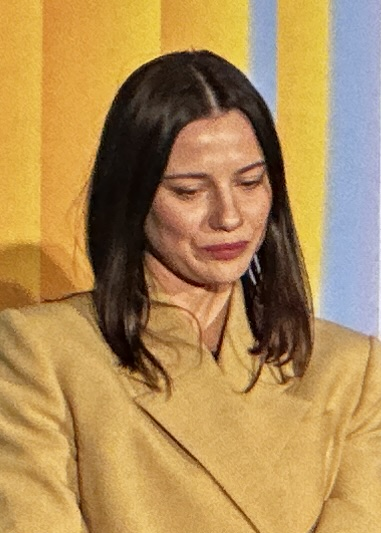
- Sullivan in 2023
- Born: Australia
- Occupation: Actress
- Years active: 2012–present

Lily Sullivan is an Australian actress. She played Coral in the 2012 film Mental and Miranda in the 2018 television series Picnic at Hanging Rock. She plays leading roles in two 2023 feature films, the Australian sci-fi thriller Monolith and the American horror film Evil Dead Rise.

== Early life and education ==
Lily Sullivan's father is an importer of medical equipment, and her mother, Jayne "Noni", is a visual artist. They emigrated to Australia from the UK together before Lily's birth. She grew up in Queensland, and the family lived in Logan City while she was attended high school.

After seeing a production of A Streetcar Named Desire on stage in Brisbane as a teenager, Sullivan became enamoured with the idea of acting, and planned to audition for one of the major drama schools. However, a callout for a film role came in her final year of high school, and she auditioned and won the role.

== Career ==
Sullivan made her feature film debut in P. J. Hogan's 2012 feature Mental, for which she auditioned while still at school, and earned an AACTA Award nomination for Best Young Actor and a Film Critics Circle of Australia Award nomination for Best Performance by a Young Actor.

In 2013, she appeared in the feature film Galore, which premiered at the Melbourne International Film Festival. For her performance, she won the Best Actress award at the 2014 Cinema des Antipodes Saint-Tropez. She moved to Melbourne after this.

Sullivan was one of two runners-up in the 2015 Heath Ledger Scholarship, along with Emilie Cocquerel. Both were given round trips to Los Angeles to increase their profiles in the US market, as well as a scholarship to attend masterclasses at Screenwise Film and Television School in Sydney.

She appeared in the second season of the television series Rake (2012) and had a recurring role in the NBC series Camp (2013), an American show filmed in Queensland. She had a role in the 2015 film Sucker, starring Timothy Spall.

In 2018, she reached further prominence in the lead role of Miranda in Picnic at Hanging Rock. Later that year, she became the face of Australian pearl company Paspaley, starring in a 60-second advertising video shot on the Kimberley coast in Western Australia.

Sullivan played Lucy in the 2021 Netflix film I Met a Girl. The same year, she was cast in the film Evil Dead Rise, written and directed by Lee Cronin, which was released on 21 April 2023.

In 2022, she was cast in the science fiction thriller film Monolith, directed by Matt Vesely. Filmed in the Adelaide Hills, the film had its Australian premiere at the Adelaide Film Festival on 27 October 2022, and its world premiere on 13 March 2023 at SXSW Film Festival. Several reviewers praised Sullivan's performance, and after the film's showing at FrightFest in London, Sullivan won Best Actress in Total Film's FrightFest Awards. In a 2023 interview she spoke about her role in Monolith being the "challenge of a lifetime", being the only actor on screen for 94 minutes, finding it "terrifying".

Sullivan stars as Sara in Soulm8te, a spin-off film from the M3GAN series. The film was shot in 2024, but its release was delayed after the sequel M3GAN 2.0 (2025) fared poorly in theaters; it was ultimately released online on 2 August 2026. It is an erotic thriller where Sullivan plays an android companion purchased by a man after his wife's death.

== Other work ==
Sullivan has also worked as a model in Australia and elsewhere.

In October 2018, Paspaley, an Australian pearling company, launched its new ad campaign entitled "Something Real", featuring Sullivan.

As of October 2023, Sullivan was trying screenwriting, working on a "confrontational" comedy-drama for a male lead, while staying with a friend in the Northern Rivers region of New South Wales.

== Filmography ==
=== Film ===
Year	Title	Role	Notes
2012	Mental	Coral Moochmore	
2013	Galore	Laura	
2015	Sucker	Sarah	
2017	Jungle	Amie	
2019	Dark Place	Sally	Segment: "Killer Native"
2021	I Met a Girl	Lucy	
2022	Monolith	The Interviewer	
2023	Evil Dead Rise	Bethany "Beth" Bixler	
2025	Forgive Us All	Rorry	Lead role
2026	Lee Cronin's The Mummy	Miss Mills	
2026	Soulm8te	Sara / Lydia	
2026	The Engagement	—N/a	Post-production

=== Television ===
Year	Title	Role	Notes
2012	Rake	Michelle	Episode: "R vs Wooldridge & Anor"
2013	Camp	Marina Barker	Main role
2018	Romper Stomper	Petra	Main role
2018	Picnic at Hanging Rock	Miranda Reid	Main role
2019	The Other Guy	Charlie	Main role
2020	Barkskins	Delphine	Main role

== Awards and nominations ==
- 2013: Nominee, AACTA Award for Best Young Actor, for Mental
- 2013: Nominee, Film Critics Circle of Australia Award for Best Performance by a Young Actor, for Mental
- 2013: Nominee, Equity Ensemble Awards, Outstanding Performance by an Ensemble in a Mini-series or Telemovie (with other cast members), for Picnic at Hanging Rock
- 2014: Co-winner, Best Actress, Cinema des Antipodes Saint-Tropez, for Galore (with Ashleigh Cummings)
- 2023: Winner, Total Film's FrightFest Awards, Best Actress, for Monolith
