= Anthony Willis =

Anthony Willis may refer to:

- Tony Willis (born 1960), British boxer
- Anthony Willis (film composer), British film composer and musician
