= Galore (film) =

- Film poster
- Directed by: Rhys Graham
- Screenplay by: Phillippa Campey
- Produced by: Phillippa Campey
- Starring: Ashleigh Cummings; Aliki Matangi; Lily Sullivan; Toby Wallace; Maya Strange
- Cinematography: Stefan Duscio
- Distributed by: Film Camp
- Release date: 1 August 2013 (Melbourne IFF)
- Running time: 103 minutes
- Country: Australia
- Language: English

Galore is a 2013 Australian drama film directed by Rhys Graham and starring Ashleigh Cummings, Toby Wallace and Lily Sullivan. The film is a coming-of-age story set during one particularly hot summer in suburban Canberra.

== Plot ==
Billie and Laura are best friends living on the outskirts of Canberra. During one scorching summer, the girls enter a love triangle with Laura's boyfriend Danny, who Billie is secretly sleeping with. Billie's mother has taken in an orphan Islander teen, Isaac, with a criminal record. Laura has aspirations to be a writer and keeps a journal. One evening, Billie, Laura, Danny and Isaac attended a house party where they consume alcohol and get drunk. Billie steals the keys to somebody's car and the four teens go for a joy ride. Billie almost hits two small children crossing the road, swerves, and flips the car. The four of them escape seemingly unharmed, though Laura complains of a headache. Over the next few days, Laura reveals to Billie that she knows about her betrayal with Danny. After this, Laura experiences a fainting spell but refuses medical attention. She sleeps with Isaac and that afternoon collapses after getting off the bus. She is rushed to hospital, but dies after an emergency operation. Billie is overcome with guilt. The heat of the summer intensifies and bushfires threaten to engulf the outer suburbs of the city as Billie, her mother and Danny find themselves escaping the region.

== Cast ==
- Ashleigh Cummings as Billie
- Toby Wallace as Danny
- Lily Sullivan as Laura
- Aliki Matangi as Isaac
- Maya Stange as Billie's mother
- Daniel Webber as Shane

== Production ==
The 2003 Canberra bushfires inspired part of the film. It is set in a hot summer in Canberra, Australian Capital Territory, specifically in Kambah, a suburban district of Tuggeranong.

Cinematography was by Stefan Duscio and the music by Christopher O’Young and Flynn Wheeler.

== Release ==
Galore premiered at the 2013 Melbourne International Film Festival, and was selected for screening at the Generation 14 Plus section of the Berlin Film Festival in February 2014.

It was released theatrically in Australia on 19 June 2014.

== Reception ==
The film received mixed reviews, with praise for the performances of the two young women.

== Awards ==
Sullivan and Cummings were joint winners of Best Actress award for their performances in the film at the 2014 Cinema des Antipodes Saint-Tropez.
