= BAFTA Award for Best Original Music =

British film industry award

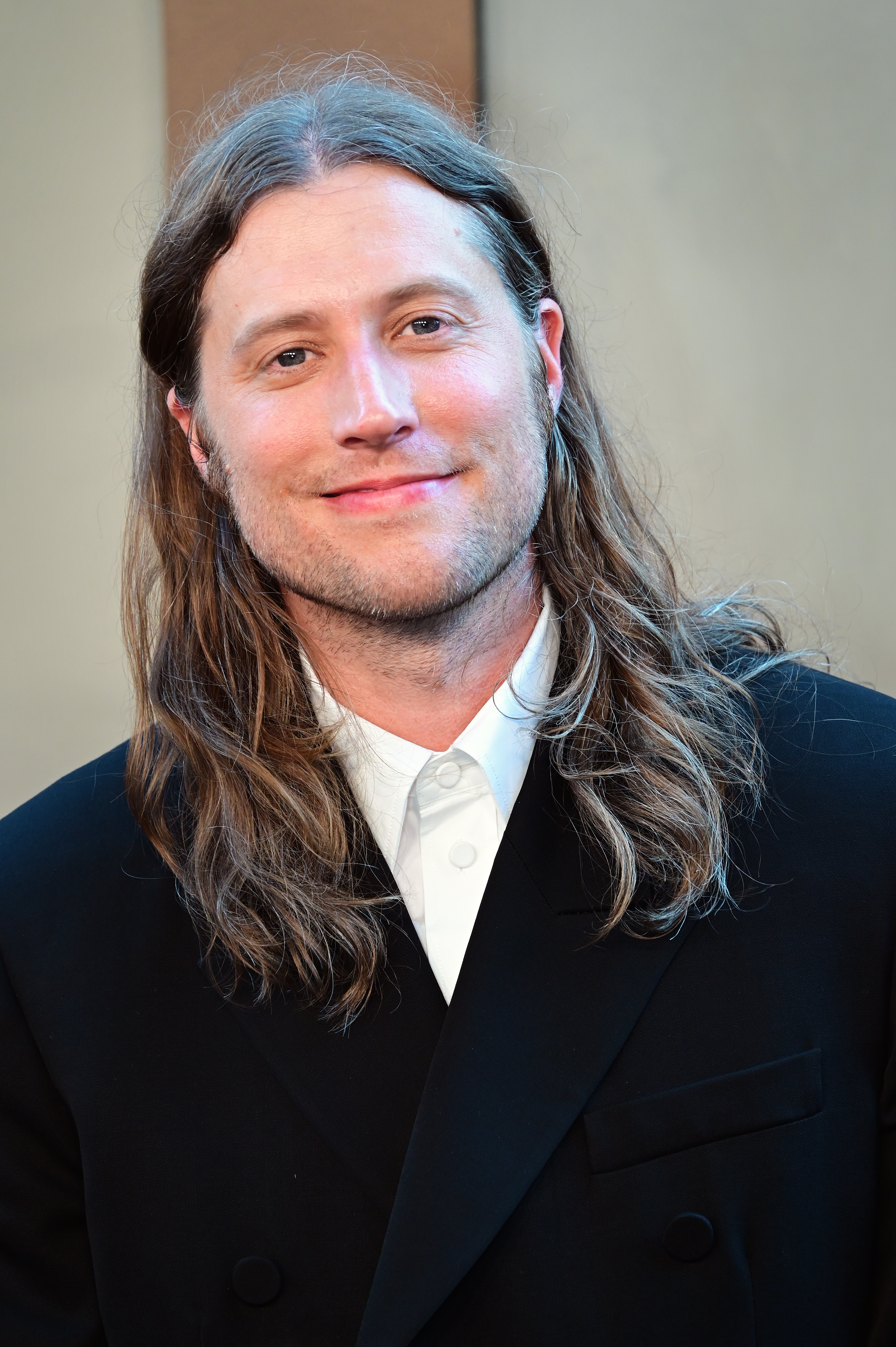
- The 2023 and 2025 recipient: Ludwig Göransson
- Awarded for: Excellence in film music
- Location: United Kingdom
- Presented by: British Academy of Film and Television Arts
- Currently held by: Ludwig Göransson for Sinners (2025)
- Website: https://www.bafta.org

The BAFTA Award for Best Original Music, formerly known as the Anthony Asquith Award for Film Music, is a film award that is presented to film composers by the British Academy of Film and Television Arts. It has been presented annually at the British Academy Film Awards since 1968.

With seven wins out of sixteen nominations, John Williams is both the most nominated and most awarded in this category. Ennio Morricone is the only composer to win in consecutive years; for The Mission in 1987 and The Untouchables in 1988. Morricone also has the highest perfect score and record, with six wins from six nominations. George Fenton and Howard Shore share the record of most nominations without a win (six each).

Only six composers have received two nominations in the same year: John Williams (1978, though his two mentions in 1975 counted as one nomination), Vangelis (1982), Maurice Jarre (1985), Hans Zimmer (2017), and the composing duo Trent Reznor and Atticus Ross (2020). In 2019, Lady Gaga became the first woman ever to win this award for A Star Is Born. In 2020, Hildur Guðnadóttir became the first woman ever credited for a solo win in this category for Joker. In 2022, Hans Zimmer won this award on his tenth nomination for Dune, setting the record for most nominations in this category before the first win.

In the following lists, the titles and names in bold with a gold background are the winners and recipients respectively; those not in bold are the nominees. The years given are those in which the films under consideration were released, not the year of the ceremony, which always takes place the following year.

== Winners and nominees ==
indicates the winner

=== 1960s ===
Year	Film	Composer(s)
Anthony Asquith Award for Original Film Music
**1968** (22nd)	**The Lion in Winter**	**John Barry**
**1968** (22nd)	The Charge of the Light Brigade	John Addison
**1968** (22nd)	Live for Life	Francis Lai
**1968** (22nd)	Romeo and Juliet	Nino Rota
**1969** (23rd)	**Z**	**Mikis Theodorakis**
**1969** (23rd)	Secret Ceremony	Richard Rodney Bennett
**1969** (23rd)	The Thomas Crown Affair	Michel Legrand
**1969** (23rd)	Women in Love	Georges Delerue

=== 1970s ===
Year	Film	Composer(s)
**1970** (24th)	**Butch Cassidy and the Sundance Kid**	**Burt Bacharach**
**1970** (24th)	Alice's Restaurant	Arlo Guthrie
**1970** (24th)	Figures in a Landscape	Richard Rodney Bennett
**1970** (24th)	The Railway Children	Johnny Douglas
**1971** (25th)	**Summer of '42**	**Michel Legrand**
**1971** (25th)	Little Big Man	John Hammond
**1971** (25th)	Shaft	Isaac Hayes
**1971** (25th)	Traffic	Charles Dumont
**1972** (26th)	**The Godfather**	**Nino Rota**
**1972** (26th)	Lady Caroline Lamb	Richard Rodney Bennett
**1972** (26th)	The Tragedy of Macbeth	Third Ear Band
**1972** (26th)	Young Winston	Alfred Ralston
**1973** (27th)	**O Lucky Man!**	**Alan Price**
**1973** (27th)	Pat Garrett and Billy the Kid	Bob Dylan
**1973** (27th)	Sounder	Taj Mahal
**1973** (27th)	State of Siege	Mikis Theodorakis
**1974** (28th)	**Murder on the Orient Express**	**Richard Rodney Bennett**
**1974** (28th)	Chinatown	Jerry Goldsmith
**1974** (28th)	Happy New Year	Francis Lai
**1974** (28th)	Serpico	Mikis Theodorakis
**1974** (28th)	The Three Musketeers	Michel Legrand
**1975** (29th)	**Jaws** / **The Towering Inferno**	**John Williams ^{[A]}**
**1975** (29th)	The Godfather Part II	Nino Rota
**1975** (29th)	The Taking of Pelham One Two Three	David Shire
**1975** (29th)	The Wind and the Lion	Jerry Goldsmith
**1976** (30th)	**Taxi Driver**	**Bernard Herrmann**
**1976** (30th)	Bugsy Malone	Paul Williams
**1976** (30th)	One Flew Over the Cuckoo's Nest	Jack Nitzsche
**1976** (30th)	The Slipper and the Rose	Richard M. Sherman and Robert B. Sherman
**1977** (31st)	**A Bridge Too Far**	**John Addison**
**1977** (31st)	Equus	Richard Rodney Bennett
**1977** (31st)	The Spy Who Loved Me	Marvin Hamlisch
**1977** (31st)	A Star Is Born	Paul Williams, Barbra Streisand, Kenny Ascher, Rupert Holmes, Leon Russell, Kenny Loggins, Alan Bergman, Marilyn Bergman and Donna Weiss
**1978** (32nd)	**Star Wars**	**John Williams**
**1978** (32nd)	Close Encounters of the Third Kind	John Williams
**1978** (32nd)	Julia	Georges Delerue
**1978** (32nd)	Saturday Night Fever	Barry Gibb, Maurice Gibb and Robin Gibb
**1979** (33rd)	**Days of Heaven**	**Ennio Morricone**
**1979** (33rd)	Alien	Jerry Goldsmith
**1979** (33rd)	Apocalypse Now	Carmine Coppola and Francis Ford Coppola
**1979** (33rd)	Yanks	Richard Rodney Bennett

=== 1980s ===
Year	Film	Composer(s)
Best Original Film Music
**1980** (34th)	**The Empire Strikes Back**	**John Williams**
**1980** (34th)	Breaking Glass	Hazel O'Connor
**1980** (34th)	Fame	Michael Gore
**1980** (34th)	Flash Gordon	John Deacon, Brian May, Freddie Mercury, Roger Taylor and Howard Blake
**1981** (35th)	**The French Lieutenant's Woman**	**Carl Davis**
**1981** (35th)	Arthur	Burt Bacharach
**1981** (35th)	Chariots of Fire	Vangelis
**1981** (35th)	Raiders of the Lost Ark	John Williams
Best Score for a Film
**1982** (36th)	**E.T. the Extra-Terrestrial**	**John Williams**
**1982** (36th)	Blade Runner	Vangelis
**1982** (36th)	Gandhi	George Fenton and Ravi Shankar
**1982** (36th)	Missing	Vangelis
**1983** (37th)	**Merry Christmas, Mr. Lawrence**	**Ryuichi Sakamoto**
**1983** (37th)	Flashdance	Giorgio Moroder
**1983** (37th)	Local Hero	Mark Knopfler
**1983** (37th)	An Officer and a Gentleman	Jack Nitzsche
**1984** (38th)	**Once Upon a Time in America**	**Ennio Morricone**
**1984** (38th)	Carmen	Paco de Lucía
**1984** (38th)	The Killing Fields	Mike Oldfield
**1984** (38th)	Paris, Texas	Ry Cooder
**1985** (39th)	**Witness**	**Maurice Jarre**
**1985** (39th)	Beverly Hills Cop	Harold Faltermeyer
**1985** (39th)	The Emerald Forest	Brian Gascoigne and Junior Homrich
**1985** (39th)	A Passage to India	Maurice Jarre
**1986** (40th)	**The Mission**	**Ennio Morricone**
**1986** (40th)	Out of Africa	John Barry
**1986** (40th)	A Room with a View	Richard Robbins
**1986** (40th)	Round Midnight	Herbie Hancock
**1987** (41st)	**The Untouchables**	**Ennio Morricone**
**1987** (41st)	Cry Freedom	George Fenton and Jonas Gwangwa
**1987** (41st)	Hope and Glory	Peter Martin
**1987** (41st)	Wish You Were Here	Stanley Myers
**1988** (42nd)	**Empire of the Sun**	**John Williams**
**1988** (42nd)	Bird	Lennie Niehaus
**1988** (42nd)	The Last Emperor	Ryuichi Sakamoto, David Byrne and Cong Su
**1988** (42nd)	Moonstruck	Dick Hyman
Best Original Film Score
**1989** (43rd)	**Dead Poets Society**	**Maurice Jarre**
**1989** (43rd)	Dangerous Liaisons	George Fenton
**1989** (43rd)	Mississippi Burning	Trevor Jones
**1989** (43rd)	Working Girl	Carly Simon

=== 1990s ===
Year	Film	Composer(s)
**1990** (44th)	**Cinema Paradiso**	**Andrea Morricone and Ennio Morricone**
**1990** (44th)	The Fabulous Baker Boys	Dave Grusin
**1990** (44th)	Memphis Belle	George Fenton
**1990** (44th)	Postcards from the Edge	Carly Simon
**1991** (45th)	**Cyrano de Bergerac**	**Jean-Claude Petit**
**1991** (45th)	Dances with Wolves	John Barry
**1991** (45th)	The Silence of the Lambs	Howard Shore
**1991** (45th)	Thelma & Louise	Hans Zimmer
**1992** (46th)	**Strictly Ballroom**	**David Hirschfelder**
**1992** (46th)	Beauty and the Beast	Howard Ashman and Alan Menken
**1992** (46th)	Hear My Song	John Altman
**1992** (46th)	The Last of the Mohicans	Randy Edelman and Trevor Jones
**1993** (47th)	**Schindler's List**	**John Williams**
**1993** (47th)	Aladdin	Alan Menken
**1993** (47th)	The Piano	Michael Nyman
**1993** (47th)	Sleepless in Seattle	Marc Shaiman
Anthony Asquith Award for Film Music
**1994** (48th)	**Backbeat**	**Don Was**
**1994** (48th)	The Adventures of Priscilla, Queen of the Desert	Guy Gross
**1994** (48th)	Four Weddings and a Funeral	Richard Rodney Bennett
**1994** (48th)	The Lion King	Hans Zimmer
**1995** (49th)	**Il Postino: The Postman**	**Luis Enríquez Bacalov**
**1995** (49th)	Braveheart	James Horner
**1995** (49th)	The Madness of King George	George Fenton
**1995** (49th)	Sense and Sensibility	Patrick Doyle
**1996** (50th)	**The English Patient**	**Gabriel Yared**
**1996** (50th)	Brassed Off	Trevor Jones
**1996** (50th)	Evita	Tim Rice and Andrew Lloyd Webber
**1996** (50th)	Shine	David Hirschfelder
**1997** (51st)	**Romeo + Juliet**	**Nellee Hooper, Craig Armstrong and Marius de Vries**
**1997** (51st)	The Full Monty	Anne Dudley
**1997** (51st)	L.A. Confidential	Jerry Goldsmith
**1997** (51st)	Titanic	James Horner
**1998** (52nd)	**Elizabeth**	**David Hirschfelder**
**1998** (52nd)	Hilary and Jackie	Barrington Pheloung
**1998** (52nd)	Saving Private Ryan	John Williams
**1998** (52nd)	Shakespeare in Love	Stephen Warbeck
**1999** (53rd)	**American Beauty**	**Thomas Newman**
**1999** (53rd)	Buena Vista Social Club	Ry Cooder and Nick Gold
**1999** (53rd)	The End of the Affair	Michael Nyman
**1999** (53rd)	The Talented Mr. Ripley	Gabriel Yared

=== 2000s ===
Year	Film	Composer(s)
**2000** (54th)	**Crouching Tiger, Hidden Dragon**	**Tan Dun**
**2000** (54th)	Almost Famous	Nancy Wilson
**2000** (54th)	Billy Elliot	Stephen Warbeck
**2000** (54th)	Gladiator	Lisa Gerrard and Hans Zimmer
**2000** (54th)	O Brother, Where Art Thou?	T Bone Burnett and Carter Burwell
**2001** (55th)	**Moulin Rouge!**	**Craig Armstrong and Marius de Vries**
**2001** (55th)	Amélie	Yann Tiersen
**2001** (55th)	The Lord of the Rings: The Fellowship of the Ring	Howard Shore
**2001** (55th)	Mulholland Dr.	Angelo Badalamenti
**2001** (55th)	Shrek	Harry Gregson-Williams and John Powell
**2002** (56th)	**The Hours**	**Philip Glass**
**2002** (56th)	Catch Me If You Can	John Williams
**2002** (56th)	Chicago	Fred Ebb, Danny Elfman and John Kander
**2002** (56th)	Gangs of New York	Howard Shore
**2002** (56th)	The Pianist	Wojciech Kilar
**2003** (57th)	**Cold Mountain**	**T Bone Burnett and Gabriel Yared**
**2003** (57th)	Girl with a Pearl Earring	Alexandre Desplat
**2003** (57th)	Kill Bill: Volume 1	RZA
**2003** (57th)	The Lord of the Rings: The Return of the King	Howard Shore
**2003** (57th)	Lost in Translation	Brian Reitzell and Kevin Shields
**2004** (58th)	**The Motorcycle Diaries**	**Gustavo Santaolalla**
**2004** (58th)	The Aviator	Howard Shore
**2004** (58th)	The Chorus	Bruno Coulais
**2004** (58th)	Finding Neverland	Jan A. P. Kaczmarek
**2004** (58th)	Ray	Craig Armstrong
**2005** (59th)	**Memoirs of a Geisha**	**John Williams**
**2005** (59th)	Brokeback Mountain	Gustavo Santaolalla
**2005** (59th)	The Constant Gardener	Alberto Iglesias
**2005** (59th)	Mrs Henderson Presents	George Fenton
**2005** (59th)	Walk the Line	T Bone Burnett
**2006** (60th)	**Babel**	**Gustavo Santaolalla**
**2006** (60th)	Casino Royale	David Arnold
**2006** (60th)	Dreamgirls	Henry Krieger
**2006** (60th)	Happy Feet	John Powell
**2006** (60th)	The Queen	Alexandre Desplat
Best Music
**2007** (61st)	**La Vie en Rose**	**Christopher Gunning**
**2007** (61st)	American Gangster	Marc Streitenfeld
**2007** (61st)	Atonement	Dario Marianelli
**2007** (61st)	The Kite Runner	Alberto Iglesias
**2007** (61st)	There Will Be Blood	Jonny Greenwood
**2008** (62nd)	**Slumdog Millionaire**	**A. R. Rahman**
**2008** (62nd)	The Curious Case of Benjamin Button	Alexandre Desplat
**2008** (62nd)	The Dark Knight	James Newton Howard and Hans Zimmer
**2008** (62nd)	Mamma Mia!	Benny Andersson and Björn Ulvaeus
**2008** (62nd)	WALL-E	Thomas Newman
**2009** (63rd)	**Up**	**Michael Giacchino**
**2009** (63rd)	Avatar	James Horner
**2009** (63rd)	Crazy Heart	T Bone Burnett and Stephen Bruton
**2009** (63rd)	Fantastic Mr. Fox	Alexandre Desplat
**2009** (63rd)	Sex & Drugs & Rock & Roll	Chaz Jankel

=== 2010s ===
Year	Film	Composer(s)
Best Original Music
**2010** (64th)	**The King's Speech**	**Alexandre Desplat**
**2010** (64th)	127 Hours	A. R. Rahman
**2010** (64th)	Alice in Wonderland	Danny Elfman
**2010** (64th)	How to Train Your Dragon	John Powell
**2010** (64th)	Inception	Hans Zimmer
**2011** (65th)	**The Artist**	**Ludovic Bource**
**2011** (65th)	The Girl with the Dragon Tattoo	Trent Reznor and Atticus Ross
**2011** (65th)	Hugo	Howard Shore
**2011** (65th)	Tinker Tailor Soldier Spy	Alberto Iglesias
**2011** (65th)	War Horse	John Williams
**2012** (66th)	**Skyfall**	**Thomas Newman**
**2012** (66th)	Anna Karenina	Dario Marianelli
**2012** (66th)	Argo	Alexandre Desplat
**2012** (66th)	Life of Pi	Mychael Danna
**2012** (66th)	Lincoln	John Williams
**2013** (67th)	**Gravity**	**Steven Price**
**2013** (67th)	12 Years a Slave	Hans Zimmer
**2013** (67th)	The Book Thief	John Williams
**2013** (67th)	Captain Phillips	Henry Jackman
**2013** (67th)	Saving Mr. Banks	Thomas Newman
**2014** (68th)	**The Grand Budapest Hotel**	**Alexandre Desplat**
**2014** (68th)	Birdman	Antonio Sánchez
**2014** (68th)	Interstellar	Hans Zimmer
**2014** (68th)	The Theory of Everything	Jóhann Jóhannsson
**2014** (68th)	Under the Skin	Mica Levi
**2015** (69th)	**The Hateful Eight**	**Ennio Morricone**
**2015** (69th)	Bridge of Spies	Thomas Newman
**2015** (69th)	The Revenant	Ryuichi Sakamoto and Carsten Nicolai
**2015** (69th)	Sicario	Jóhann Jóhannsson
**2015** (69th)	Star Wars: The Force Awakens	John Williams
**2016** (70th)	**La La Land**	**Justin Hurwitz**
**2016** (70th)	Arrival	Jóhann Jóhannsson
**2016** (70th)	Jackie	Mica Levi
**2016** (70th)	Lion	Hauschka and Dustin O'Halloran
**2016** (70th)	Nocturnal Animals	Abel Korzeniowski
**2017** (71st)	**The Shape of Water**	**Alexandre Desplat**
**2017** (71st)	Blade Runner 2049	Benjamin Wallfisch and Hans Zimmer
**2017** (71st)	Darkest Hour	Dario Marianelli
**2017** (71st)	Dunkirk	Hans Zimmer
**2017** (71st)	Phantom Thread	Jonny Greenwood
**2018** (72nd)	**A Star Is Born**	**Bradley Cooper, Lady Gaga and Lukas Nelson**
**2018** (72nd)	BlacKkKlansman	Terence Blanchard
**2018** (72nd)	If Beale Street Could Talk	Nicholas Britell
**2018** (72nd)	Isle of Dogs	Alexandre Desplat
**2018** (72nd)	Mary Poppins Returns	Marc Shaiman
**2019** (73rd)	**Joker**	**Hildur Guðnadóttir**
**2019** (73rd)	1917	Thomas Newman
**2019** (73rd)	Jojo Rabbit	Michael Giacchino
**2019** (73rd)	Little Women	Alexandre Desplat
**2019** (73rd)	Star Wars: The Rise of Skywalker	John Williams

=== 2020s ===
Year	Film	Composer(s)
**2020** (74th)	**Soul**	**Jon Batiste, Trent Reznor and Atticus Ross**
**2020** (74th)	Minari	Emile Mosseri
**2020** (74th)	News of the World	James Newton Howard
**2020** (74th)	Promising Young Woman	Anthony Willis
**2020** (74th)	Mank	Trent Reznor and Atticus Ross
**2021** (75th)	**Dune**	**Hans Zimmer**
**2021** (75th)	Being the Ricardos	Daniel Pemberton
**2021** (75th)	Don't Look Up	Nicholas Britell
**2021** (75th)	The French Dispatch	Alexandre Desplat
**2021** (75th)	The Power of the Dog	Jonny Greenwood
**2022** (76th)	**All Quiet on the Western Front**	**Volker Bertelmann**
**2022** (76th)	Babylon	Justin Hurwitz
**2022** (76th)	The Banshees of Inisherin	Carter Burwell
**2022** (76th)	Everything Everywhere All at Once	Son Lux
**2022** (76th)	Guillermo del Toro's Pinocchio	Alexandre Desplat
**2023** (77th)	**Oppenheimer**	**Ludwig Göransson**
**2023** (77th)	Killers of the Flower Moon	Robbie Robertson
**2023** (77th)	Poor Things	Jerskin Fendrix
**2023** (77th)	Saltburn	Anthony Willis
**2023** (77th)	Spider-Man: Across the Spider-Verse	Daniel Pemberton
**2024** (78th)	**The Brutalist**	**Daniel Blumberg**
**2024** (78th)	Conclave	Volker Bertelmann
**2024** (78th)	Emilia Pérez	Clément Ducol and Camille
**2024** (78th)	Nosferatu	Robin Carolan
**2024** (78th)	The Wild Robot	Kris Bowers
**2025** (79th)	**Sinners**	**Ludwig Göransson**
**2025** (79th)	Bugonia	Jerskin Fendrix
**2025** (79th)	Frankenstein	Alexandre Desplat
**2025** (79th)	Hamnet	Max Richter
**2025** (79th)	One Battle After Another	Jonny Greenwood

== Multiple wins and nominations ==
=== Multiple nominations ===
16 nominations

- John Williams

13 nominations

- Alexandre Desplat

10 nominations

- Hans Zimmer

7 nominations

- Richard Rodney Bennett

6 nominations

- George Fenton
- Ennio Morricone
- Thomas Newman
- Howard Shore

4 nominations

- T Bone Burnett
- Jerry Goldsmith
- Jonny Greenwood

3 nominations

- Craig Armstrong
- John Barry
- David Hirschfelder
- James Horner
- Alberto Iglesias
- Maurice Jarre
- Jóhann Jóhannsson
- Trevor Jones
- Michel Legrand
- Dario Marianelli
- John Powell
- Trent Reznor
- Atticus Ross
- Nino Rota
- Ryuichi Sakamoto
- Gustavo Santaolalla
- Mikis Theodorakis
- Vangelis
- Gabriel Yared

2 nominations

- John Addison
- Burt Bacharach
- Nicholas Britell
- Carter Burwell
- Ry Cooder
- Georges Delerue
- Marius de Vries
- Danny Elfman
- Jerskin Fendrix
- Michael Giacchino
- Ludwig Göransson
- James Newton Howard
- Justin Hurwitz
- Francis Lai
- Mica Levi
- Alan Menken
- Jack Nitzsche
- Michael Nyman
- Daniel Pemberton
- A. R. Rahman
- Marc Shaiman
- Carly Simon
- Stephen Warbeck
- Paul Williams
- Anthony Willis

=== Multiple wins ===
7 wins

- John Williams

6 wins

- Ennio Morricone

3 wins

- Alexandre Desplat

2 wins

- Craig Armstrong
- Marius de Vries
- Ludwig Göransson
- David Hirschfelder
- Maurice Jarre
- Thomas Newman
- Gustavo Santaolalla
- Gabriel Yared

== See also ==
- Academy Award for Best Original Score
- Cannes Soundtrack Award
- Critics' Choice Movie Award for Best Score
- European Film Award for Best Composer
- Golden Globe Award for Best Original Score
- Grammy Award for Best Score Soundtrack for Visual Media
- Grammy Award for Best Compilation Soundtrack for Visual Media

== Notes ==
A^{1} : According to the BAFTAs database, John Williams received a single joint award for two different films.
