= M3GAN 2.0 =

2025 film by Gerard Johnstone

- Theatrical release poster
- Directed by: Gerard Johnstone
- Screenplay by: Gerard Johnstone
- Story by: Gerard Johnstone; Akela Cooper
- Based on: Characters by: Akela Cooper; James Wan
- Produced by: Jason Blum; James Wan; Allison Williams
- Starring: Allison Williams; Violet McGraw; Ivanna Sakhno; Jemaine Clement
- Cinematography: Toby Oliver
- Edited by: Jeff McEvoy
- Music by: Chris Bacon
- Production companies: Blumhouse Productions; Atomic Monster
- Distributed by: Universal Pictures
- Release dates: June 24, 2025 (New York City); June 27, 2025 (United States)
- Running time: 120 minutes
- Country: United States
- Language: English
- Budget: $15–25 million
- Box office: $39.1 million

M3GAN 2.0 is a 2025 American science fiction action film written and directed by Gerard Johnstone from a story he co-wrote with Akela Cooper. A sequel to the 2022 film M3GAN and the second installment in the M3GAN franchise, the film stars Allison Williams, Violet McGraw, Ivanna Sakhno, and Jemaine Clement, with Amie Donald physically portraying M3GAN while Jenna Davis voices the character. Jason Blum and James Wan return as producers under their respective Blumhouse Productions and Atomic Monster companies. It follows M3GAN being rebuilt to combat a humanoid military robot built using M3GAN's technology that is attempting an AI takeover.

M3GAN 2.0 premiered in New York on June 24, 2025, and was released in North America by Universal Pictures on June 27. The film received mixed reviews from critics and grossed $39.1 million against a budget of $15–25 million as a box office bomb.

== Plot ==
U.S. Army colonel Sattler, head of a secret branch of the Pentagon specializing in new technologies, gives a demonstration of AMELIA, (Note: An acronym for "autonomous military engagement logistics and infiltration android") an android designed for infiltration and assassination missions and built using technology copied from the original M3GAN. During her mission, however, AMELIA reveals to Sattler that she is self-aware and escapes from his control.

Two years after M3GAN went rogue, (Note: As depicted in M3GAN (2022)) Gemma—now an author and an advocate for AI regulation in partnership with cybersecurity expert Christian—is working on an experimental robotic exoskeleton with former workmates Cole and Tess. She still lives with her niece Cady, who is studying computer science. Gemma turns down an offer from misanthropic billionaire Alton Appleton to work for him.

After Gemma learns from Sattler of AMELIA's existence, M3GAN reveals herself to Gemma, having survived by making a backup of her program in Gemma's smart home, and offers collaboration to stop AMELIA in return for a physical body. Still traumatized from M3GAN's crimes, Gemma traps M3GAN in a harmless Moxie robot until she can prove herself trustworthy. M3GAN warns Gemma that AMELIA will ambush Alton during a party he is hosting.

At the party, Gemma discovers Cole has joined Alton's company and uses his keycard to enter the server room. M3GAN hacks into the server and finds that AMELIA murdered Alton after copying his biometrics to gain access to his company's systems. Escaping back to Gemma's house, M3GAN leads Gemma, Cady, Cole, and Tess into an underground bunker she built and stocked with supplies to hide once AMELIA completes an AI takeover. Cady confronts M3GAN, who expresses sincere regret for her behavior. Cady encourages M3GAN to help them, not because of her programming, but because it is the right thing to do.

Gemma and her team create a new body for M3GAN, who reveals that AMELIA aims to merge Alton's cloud computing infrastructure with a rogue AI built by Xenox in the 1980s, whose motherboard has been trapped in isolation. After decades of machine learning, it can grant mastery of any technology. Learning that only Christian knows the motherboard's location, M3GAN poses as a dancer to meet Christian at a tech conference, but Gemma calls him, enabling AMELIA to trace and find him. AMELIA assassinates a Chinese ambassador meeting with Christian, kidnaps Cady and escapes. Gemma, Tess, Cole, and M3GAN take Christian to their bunker, where he reveals the motherboard is hidden in Xenox's old headquarters, protected by a security system using Christian's hand geometry. They build a hand replica for M3GAN and plan to infiltrate, destroy the motherboard, and rescue Cady.

Christian incapacitates Tess and reveals to Gemma that AMELIA is, in fact, just a non-sentient drone under his control. Christian had deliberately created and manipulated AMELIA to stoke fear of AI, which he believes must be under complete human control, and intends to persuade the leaders of the G20 to approve regulations to eliminate AI from the global economy. He then disables both M3GAN and AMELIA, and orders the installation of a neural implant to enslave Gemma for refusing to help him. Unknown to Christian, M3GAN had uploaded herself into the implant before her body was shut down and helps Gemma escape.

Cole rescues Cady, and they go to AMELIA, using her residual programming to turn her to their side. Sustaining heavy damage, AMELIA reboots—now actually self-aware—and plans to absorb the motherboard's programming and cause human extinction. Christian attempts to flee the building, but AMELIA kills him and takes his hand to access the motherboard. Cole leaves with Tess while M3GAN reinserts herself into her robotic body and battles AMELIA. As AMELIA overpowers M3GAN and merges herself with the motherboard, M3GAN decides to sacrifice herself by using an EMP failsafe in her arm to defeat AMELIA. After saying goodbye to Gemma and Cady, M3GAN tackles AMELIA and Gemma triggers the EMP, destroying both androids and the motherboard in the process.

With evidence from the vault, Gemma testifies before Congress, urging AI regulation that allows humans to cooperate alongside it rather than control it. At home, she and Cady find that M3GAN survived by installing a second backup of herself on Gemma's computer.

== Cast ==
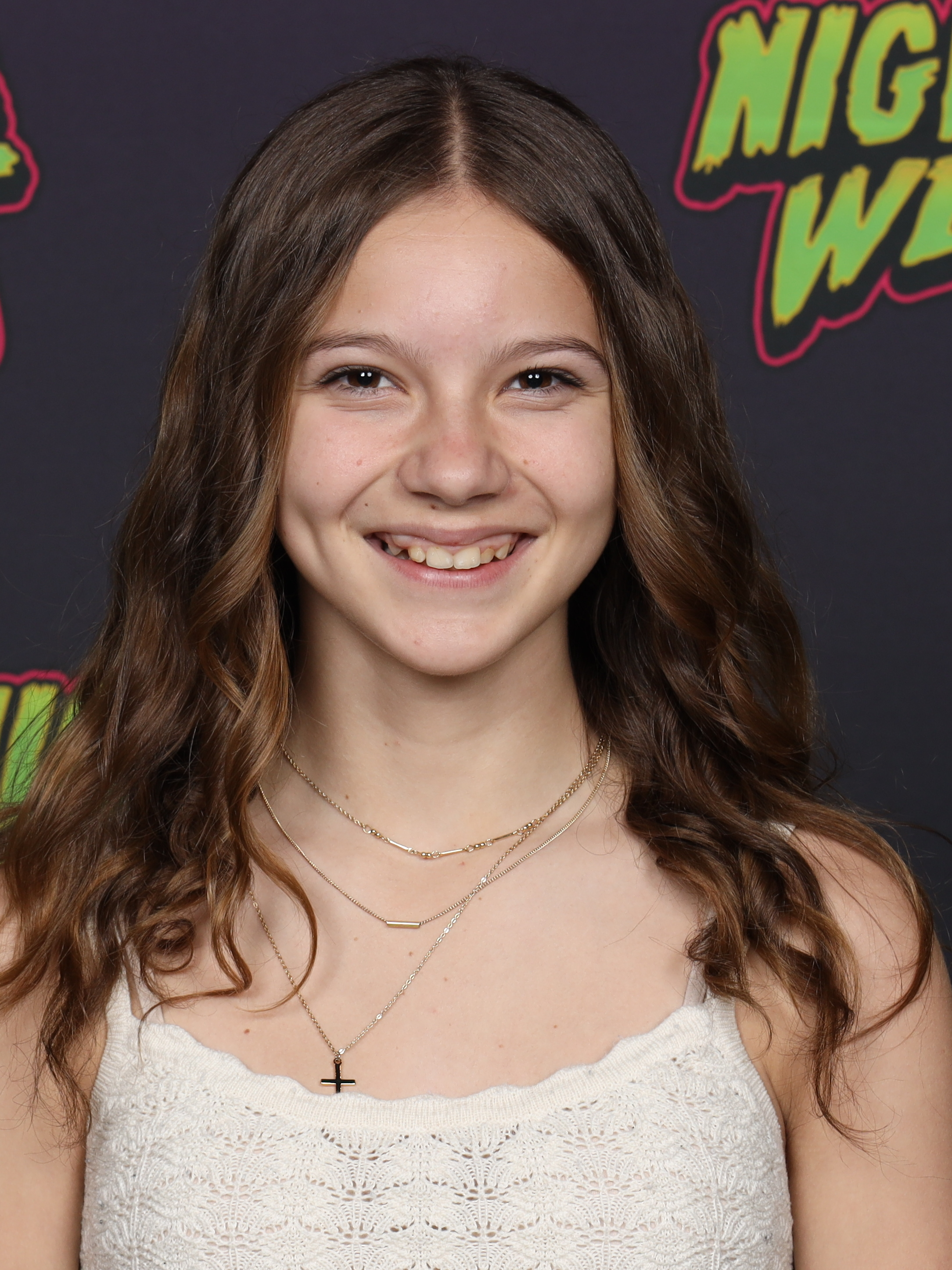
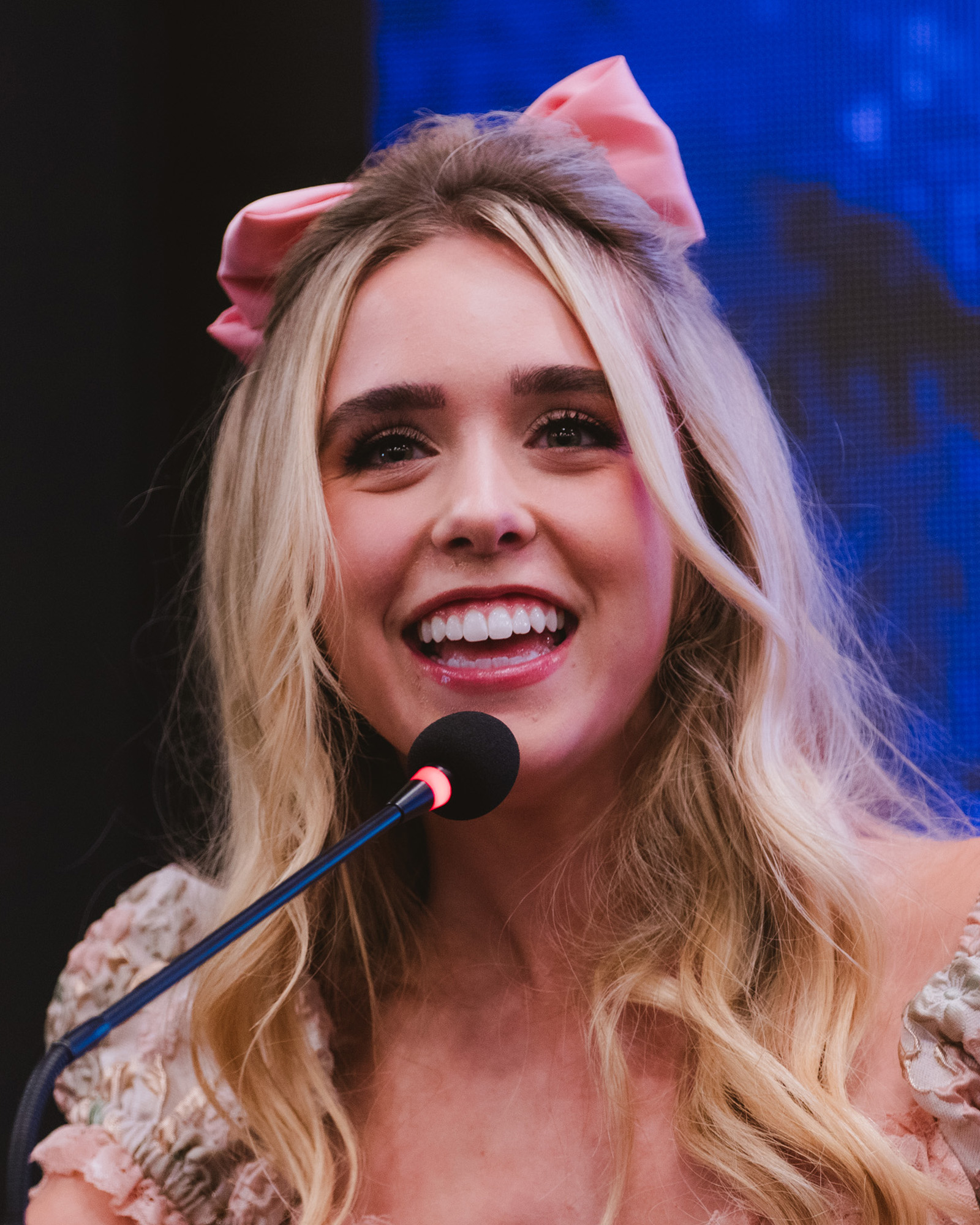
Amie Donald and Jenna Davis reprise their roles as the body and voice of M3GAN.
- Allison Williams as Gemma, a roboticist, advocate for ethical usage of AI, and M3GAN's creator
- Violet McGraw as Cady, Gemma's niece
- Amie Donald as M3GAN (model 3 generative android), a powerful AI-driven robot built by Gemma
  - Jenna Davis as the voice of M3GAN
- Brian Jordan Alvarez as Cole, one of Gemma's coworkers
- Jen Van Epps as Tess, one of Gemma's coworkers
- Ivanna Sakhno as AMELIA (autonomous military engagement logistics & infiltration android), a hostile new robot created from M3GAN's original design who becomes self-aware
- Aristotle Athari as Christian, a cybersecurity expert and anti-AI activist
- Jemaine Clement as Alton Appleton, a corrupt tech billionaire whose company has made breakthroughs in biomechatronics
- Timm Sharp as Sattler, an army colonel responsible for the creation of AMELIA

== Production ==
=== Development ===
In November 2022, The New York Times reported that Universal Pictures was pleased by how M3GAN's box office performance had turned out and had plans for a sequel. In January 2023, Gerard Johnstone confirmed talks of a sequel, with James Wan explaining that he had an "idea of where sequels would go". A few weeks later, Universal confirmed a release date and that the title would be M3GAN 2.0. Akela Cooper was set to return to write the sequel script and Johnstone was also set to return to direct.

=== Casting ===
Allison Williams and Violet McGraw reprise their roles as Gemma and Cady, respectively. Amie Donald, Jenna Davis, Brian Jordan Alvarez and Jen Van Epps also reprise their roles from the prior film while Ivanna Sakhno, Timm Sharp, Aristotle Athari and Jemaine Clement join the main cast.

=== Filming ===
Principal photography began in Auckland, New Zealand, on July 15, 2024, and finished on September 21, lasting 52 days.

=== Visual effects ===
To develop the role of AMELIA, Sakhno worked with a separate stunt team. She also learnt several martial arts including Krav Maga and Tai Chi, creating a distinctive combat style that would contrast with the less lethal Wing Chun and Aikido used by M3GAN.

== Music ==
M3GAN 2.0 (Original Motion Picture Soundtrack)

Film score by Chris Bacon
- Released: June 27, 2025
- Recorded: 2024
- Genre: Film score
- Label: Back Lot Music
- Producer: Chris Bacon

Chris Bacon chronology
Heretic (2024)	M3GAN 2.0 (2025)

Chris Bacon composed the score for the sequel, replacing Anthony Willis from the first film. The soundtrack to the film was later released on June 27, 2025.

=== Track listing ===
No.	Title	Length
1.	"M3gan 2.0"	1:01
2.	"The Asset"	3:55
3.	"Excess Baggage"	1:04
4.	"You Don’t Have to Hide"	2:11
5.	"Sattler Interrogates Gemma"	3:49
6.	"Ghost in the Machine"	3:20
7.	"Moxie M3gan"	2:37
8.	"M3gan’s Lair"	3:25
9.	"M3ch M3gan"	3:47
10.	"The Motherboard"	3:32
11.	" Convention Battle"	2:20
12.	"You’re Just the Help"	1:26
13.	"The Plan"	2:32
14.	"It’s Called Being a Mother"	1:40
15.	"Xenox Park"	1:33
16.	"Wingsuit"	2:05
17.	"Betrayal"	1:26
18.	"Tour of the Vault"	3:24
19.	"Brok3n M3gan"	3:07
20.	"These Are Gym Muscles"	2:56
21.	"Failed Pairing"	2:25
22.	"No One’s Play Thing"	0:56
23.	"Exo-Fight"	1:48
24.	"M3gan, Take The Wheel"	1:41
25.	"Self-Destruct Initiated"	1:25
26.	"Unarmed"	2:04
27.	"Final Confrontation"	2:09
28.	"Because Its Right"	1:51
29.	"Allies, Not Enemies"	2:21

=== Release history ===
Release dates and formats for M3GAN (Original Motion Picture Soundtrack)
Region	Date	Format(s)	Label	Ref.
Various	June 27, 2025	Digital download; streaming	Back Lot Music	
Various	2025	Vinyl	Waxwork Records	

== Release ==
M3GAN 2.0 had its world premiere in New York on June 24, 2025, at the AMC Lincoln Square 13, and was released on June 27. The film was originally scheduled to be released on January 17, 2025, and May 16, 2025.

=== Marketing ===
In June 2025, an event in a Roblox horror-surivial game, PIGGY, was released in a tie-in promotion to the sequel that freatures the film's character, along with other games from Roblox such as Clip It and Evade. In addition, Roblox also released a "M3GAN’s Lair" integration which allows players to build their own M3GAN using "smart character" tech for the first time.

=== Home media ===
M3GAN 2.0 was released by Universal Studios Home Entertainment on digital on July 15, 2025, and was released on 4K Ultra HD Blu-ray, Blu-ray and DVD on September 23, 2025, with all formats receiving an unrated version.

== Reception ==
=== Box office ===
M3GAN 2.0 grossed $24 million in the United States and Canada, and $15 million in other territories, for a worldwide total of $39 million.

In the United States and Canada, M3GAN 2.0 was released alongside F1 and was projected to gross around $20 million from 3,112 theaters in its opening weekend. The film made $4.6 million on its first day, including $1.5 million from Thursday night previews. It went on to debut to $10.2 million, finishing in fifth and earning approximately a third of the first film's $30.4 million opening weekend. Speaking about the underperformance, producer Jason Blum stated: "We all thought Megan was like Superman. We could do anything to her. We could change genres. We could put her in the summer. We could make her look different. We could turn her from a bad guy into a good guy. And we classically over-thought how powerful people's engagement was with her."

=== Critical response ===
On the review aggregator website Rotten Tomatoes, 57% of 244 critics' reviews are positive, with an average rating of 5.8/10. The website's consensus reads: "M3gan 2.0 swaps the original's horror software for a more action-leaning programming that doesn't prove to be an upgrade, although the quippy A.I. remains an amusing mascot of slay." Metacritic, which uses a weighted average, assigned the film a score of 54 out of 100, based on 42 critics, indicating "mixed or average" reviews. Audiences polled by CinemaScore gave the film an average grade of B+ on an A+ to F scale, while those surveyed by PostTrak gave the film a 62% "definite recommend" score.

Robbie Collin of The Daily Telegraph gave the film 4/5 stars, writing: "In a sequel to a film in which a fun invention ends up causing the violent deaths of multiple innocent parties, how do you get one of the survivors to say with a straight face: 'Right then, guys, who’s up for building another one?' This uproarious (if not especially scary) sequel has the measure of the task at hand’s silliness, and leans into it with infectious glee." The Independent's Clarisse Loughrey also gave it 4/5 stars, calling it "a hyper-camp, dumb-funny, unexpected mashup of T2 and Mission: Impossible" and "a pretty bizarre conflagration of tones and ideas. But so were most of the Child's Play films that this series owes so much of its conceit to, and the rollercoaster effect of never quite knowing what genre Johnstone might pull from next is a key part of the fun."

David Rooney of The Hollywood Reporter was more critical, writing: "The humor is forced to compete with seriously overcomplicated plotting in a sequel that entangles its horror comedy roots with uninspired espionage elements, becoming a convoluted mishmash with shades of T2, Mission: Impossible and the Austin Powers franchise." Donald Clarke of The Irish Times gave the film 1/5 stars and wrote: "The sequel to M3GAN is absolutely T3RRIBL3. It's as if nobody involved with that 2023 cybershocker – Gerard Johnstone returns to directing duties – has any idea what made it such a hilarious blast." Rolling Stone's David Fear said: "Recasting [M3GAN] from potential slasher-flick franchise superstar to something like M3GAN Bond must have felt like an upgrade. The result is more like the Microsoft Bob of horror sequels. Her model is 2.0. The overbaked, underwhelming, narratively restless movie itself is 0.0 percent watchable."
