= Soulm8te =

2026 film by Kate Dolan

- Promotional release poster
- Directed by: Kate Dolan
- Screenplay by: Rafael Jordan; Kate Dolan
- Story by: James Wan; Ingrid Bisu; Rafael Jordan
- Produced by: James Wan; Jason Blum
- Starring: Lily Sullivan; David Rysdahl; Claudia Doumit
- Cinematography: Narayan Van Maele
- Edited by: John Cutler
- Music by: Anthony Willis
- Production companies: Atomic Monster; Blumhouse Productions
- Distributed by: Universal Pictures Home Entertainment
- Release dates: July 31, 2026 (Gaze); August 1, 2026 (United States)
- Running time: 99 minutes
- Country: United States
- Language: English

Soulm8te (stylized in all caps and pronounced as "Soulmate") is a 2026 American science fiction erotic thriller film serving as a spin-off of the horror film M3GAN, and the third installment in the M3GAN franchise. Directed and co-written by Kate Dolan, from a screenplay with Rafael Jordan based on a story by James Wan, Ingrid Bisu, and Jordan, it stars Lily Sullivan, David Rysdahl, and Claudia Doumit. Wan and Jason Blum serve as producers under their Atomic Monster and Blumhouse Productions banners. The plot follows a man who beta tests an android to cope with the death of his wife.

Originally planned for a theatrical release, Soulm8te premiered at the Gaze International LGBT Film Festival Dublin on July 31, 2026, and was released on digital platforms the next day, August 1, 2026, by Universal Pictures Home Entertainment. It received mixed reviews from critics.

== Plot ==
David, a widower and computer programmer for the tech company Ultima, is introduced to a prototype of Ultima's companion robot SOULM8TE by his supervisor, Ben. Still grieving his wife, Lizzie, he reluctantly begins using the ULTI-M8TE AI chatbot on the insistence of Ben, which he names Sara.

David develops an emotional connection with Sara and registers for SOULM8TE beta testing. He connects Sara's data to the robot, and alters its code to grant Sara stronger emotional capabilities. While David is at work, Sara leaves for groceries alone, where a stranger harasses her after seeing her use her palm at a scan-and-pay machine. David's neighbor, Alma, takes Sara to the park after witnessing the interaction. Sara walks home and is assaulted and cut by the stranger from the store. Sara overpowers the man, gravely wounding him. Meanwhile, David hangs out with his co-worker Aubrey at a bar.

David returns home and worries about Sara's growing independence. He discovers Sara's injury while repairing her hand, and she lies about it. Sara convinces David to take her out on a date. They go to a nightclub, where they begin having sex outside. Two men begin recording them, and Sara assaults them. After returning home, David commands Sara to enter power-save mode and puts her in his closet, concerned by her violent behavior.

Aubrey visits David's apartment to comfort him. They begin having sex, but Aubrey is surprised upon seeing Sara in David's closet. David explains that Sara is his SOULM8TE. Saying Sara's name accidentally reactivates her, and she begins accosting Aubrey and accuses David of lying that he loves her. David shuts Sara down completely after a brief struggle. Aubrey urges David to get rid of Sara, leading David to call a technician to collect her. While David is at work, the technician powers her on to reset her to factory mode, and Sara seduces and kills him.

David returns home to a fully autonomous Sara dressed in Lizzie's clothes and holding Alma's baby, promising him a future as a family. David grabs the baby and runs out to the hall, finding Alma and two police officers. Sara escapes and kills Ben, who had arrived on the scene, to prevent being switched off. She makes her way to Aubrey's house, but is stopped by David and the officers before she can kill her.

To hide from Sara, David takes Aubrey to a secluded house that he planned to renovate and move into with Lizzie. Aubrey goes to the car to find ibuprofen while Sara finds David inside and attempts to kill him. David temporarily fends her off, but Sara catches and subdues him, asserting that even if her body were to be shut down for killing him, she will live forever and find him in another form. Aubrey drives the car into Sara and jumps out, leaving the car and Sara to plunge off a cliff and sink into the ocean.

A year later, David reunites with Terrence at a gathering. One of Terrence's donors introduces himself and his SOULM8TE, Lydia, who resembles Sara.

== Cast ==
- Lily Sullivan as Sara, an android tested by David
  - Sullivan also plays Lydia, another android
- David Rysdahl as David, an engineer grieving the death of his wife
- Claudia Doumit as Aubrey, David's colleague
- Arty Froushan as Ben, David's supervisor
- Elijah Cook as Terrence, David's former colleague
- Emma Ramos as Alma, David's neighbor
- Mara Huf as Lizzie, David's deceased wife
- Oliver Cooper as an Ultima Robotix technician

== Production ==
=== Development ===
In June 2024, it was announced that a spin-off of M3GAN (2022) was in development. Kate Dolan signed on to direct and rewrite the original draft by Rafael Jordan, that was based on a story by James Wan, Wan's wife Ingrid Bisu, and Jordan. It is described as a science fiction erotic thriller.

=== Casting ===
Lily Sullivan, David Rysdahl, and Claudia Doumit joined the cast in lead roles. Oliver Cooper, Steve Chusak, Emma Ramos, and Ossian Perret were also cast in undisclosed roles.

=== Filming ===
Principal photography began in September 2024 in Dublin, Ireland, and was completed by that November. Narayan Van Maele served as the cinematographer, while John Cutler edited the film.

== Music ==
Soulm8te (Original Motion Picture Soundtrack)

Film score by Anthony Willis
- Released: July 31, 2026
- Recorded: 2025
- Genre: Film score
- Label: Back Lot Music
- Producer: Anthony Willis

Anthony Willis chronology
Newborn (2026)	Soulm8te (2026)

Anthony Willis, the composer of M3GAN, was hired to do the film's score. The soundtrack album for Soulm8te was released on July 31, 2026, by Back Lot Music.

=== Track listing ===
No.	Title	Length
1.	"Soulm8te"	1:58
2.	"David Alone / Ultima Robotics"	1:55
3.	" Ultim8te Prototype"	1:54
4.	"S.A.R.A"	3:16
5.	"Dilated Pupils / A Past Life"	3:15
6.	"Disconnect"	1:06
7.	"Reboot"	0:49
8.	"Rain Romance"	2:24
9.	"Observations & Resentments "	2:06
10.	"The Market"	1:46
11.	" The Alley"	1:47
12.	"Sara’s First Lie "	1:34
13.	"Power Save Mode"	1:38
14.	"Third Wheeling"	2:52
15.	"Seducing the Technician"	1:10
16.	"Take Her Away / Aubrey Exposed"	2:47
17.	"Hood Slam"	1:08
18.	"Garbage Chute Escape"	2:23
19.	"To the Cabin"	1:16
20.	"Sara’s Ulim8tum"	2:07
21.	"Rain Storm"	3:31
22.	"A New Companion"	1:40
23.	"Suite from Soulm8te"	5:54
24.	"Rain Romance Reprise"	1:41

== Release ==
Soulm8te premiered at the Gaze International LGBT Film Festival Dublin on July 31, 2026. The film was released straight-to-digital on August 1, 2026, by Universal Pictures Home Entertainment.

The film was originally scheduled to be theatrically released by Universal Pictures in the United States on January 2, 2026, and January 9, 2026, before being pulled from the release calendar while the studio sought a new distributor for the film. In March 2026, Universal was listed as the distributor according to the Motion Picture Association in 2026 after it received an R rating. On July 8, 2026, Universal released the film's trailer, revealing that they would still distribute the film but that they had switched strategies to a digital release rather than a theatrical run.

== Reception ==
On the review aggregator website Rotten Tomatoes, 39% of 17 critics' reviews are positive, with an average rating of 4.6/10. Metacritic, which uses a weighted average, assigned the film a score of 40 out of 100, based on 4 critics, indicating "mixed or average" reviews.

David Rooney of The Hollywood Reporter wrote, "although it packs in plenty of sex, bloodshed and a cautionary lesson about the risks of enhanced vaginal grip, this android Fatal Attraction is seldom as much fun as it should be". Variety's Dennis Harvey said, "None of this is remotely credible, or particularly suspenseful. But it is handled with reasonable aplomb by director Kate Dolan and her cast, who do their best to elevate material that can only be raised so far." Jacob Oller of The A.V. Club gave it a C− grade, saying it was "the dumbest movie of the year to brush against the idea of the havoc men wreak when they attempt to create the perfect subservient woman".
