= Akela Cooper =

American screenwriter and television producer

- Born: September 21, 1981 (age 45); Hayti, Missouri, U.S.
- Education: USC School of Cinema-Television (MFA)
- Occupations: Screenwriter; television producer
- Years active: 2012–present
- Notable work: The Nun II; Malignant; M3GAN

Akela Cooper (born September 21, 1981) is an American screenwriter and television producer. She is best known for co-creating the M3GAN franchise with James Wan. She also wrote the horror films Hell Fest (2018), Malignant (2021) and The Nun II (2023). Cooper was named in Variety's 10 Screenwriters to Watch for 2021 list.

== Early life and education ==
Cooper was raised in Hayti, Missouri. She enjoyed watching horror films with her family from childhood, including A Nightmare on Elm Street. She described seeing Pumpkinhead when she was eight as a "core memory" that influenced her writing.

She graduated from Truman State University with a degree in creative writing in 2003 and received her Master of Fine Arts (MFA) from the USC School of Cinema-Television, where she was the first recipient of the NAACP/CBS Writer's Fellowship.

== Career ==
Cooper was a staff writer for Grimm for two seasons and went on to be a writer and co-producer for The 100, American Horror Story, Luke Cage, Jupiter's Legacy, Witches of East End, and Chambers. She wrote the horror film Malignant, released in September 2021. She gained wider prominence as the screenwriter of the 2022 horror film M3GAN, which grossed $180 million worldwide and received mainly positive critical reception. She next wrote the screenplay for the horror film The Nun II, released in 2023.

In 2021 she was announced as the showrunner for the upcoming HBO Max television adaptation of the novel Monster by A. Lee Martinez. She will write the screenplay for the adaptation of a short story It's Over by Jack Follman produced by Vertigo Entertainment and Ground Control for Sony Pictures.

In October 2024, it was announced that she will write and co-produce a screenplay of the comic The Lot by Marguerite Bennett for the publisher Bad Idea. The strip tells the story of a Black woman chosen to head a movie studio without knowing that an occult ritual depicted in a filmmaker's latest project has awakened a dormant evil. Cooper will also adapt a story about Medusa called Don't Look by Colin Bannon for Janelle Monae's Wondaland production company. Cooper co-wrote the sequel to M3GAN, M3GAN 2.0 (2025).

== Awards and nominations ==
- 2017 – Nominee, NAACP Image Award for Outstanding Writing in a Dramatic Series (for Luke Cage)
- 2017 – Nominee, Black Reel Award for Outstanding Drama Series (for Luke Cage)
- 2024 – Nominee, Fangoria Chainsaw Award for Best Screenplay (for M3GAN)

== Filmography ==
Film

Year	Title	Notes	Ref
2018	Hell Fest		
2021	Malignant		
2022	M3GAN		
2023	The Nun II	Co-written with Ian Goldberg and Richard Naing	
2025	M3GAN 2.0	Story only; Co-written with Gerard Johnstone	

Television

Year	Title	Writer	Producer	Notes	Ref.
2012	Tron: Uprising	Yes	No	1 episode	
2012–2013	Grimm	Yes	No	3 episodes	
2014	Witches of East End	Yes	Yes	1 episode	
2014–2015	The 100	Yes	Yes	3 episodes	
2016	American Horror Story	Yes	Supervising	1 episode	
2016–2018	Luke Cage	Yes	Yes	4 episodes	
2018–2019	Avengers Assemble	Yes	No	2 episodes	
2019	Chambers	Yes	Executive	1 episode	
2021	Jupiter's Legacy	Yes	Executive	1 episode	
2022	Star Trek: Strange New Worlds	Yes	Executive	2 episodes	
2025	The Last Frontier	Yes	No	1 episode	
TBA	Monster	TBA	TBA	Showrunner	
