= M3GAN =

2022 American science fiction horror film

- Theatrical release poster
- Directed by: Gerard Johnstone
- Screenplay by: Akela Cooper
- Story by: Akela Cooper; James Wan
- Produced by: Jason Blum; James Wan
- Starring: Allison Williams; Ronny Chieng; Violet McGraw; Jenna Davis; Amie Donald; Brian Jordan Alvarez; Jen Van Epps; Stephane Garneau-Monten; Lori Dungey; Amy Usherwood
- Cinematography: Peter McCaffrey
- Edited by: Jeff McEvoy
- Music by: Anthony Willis
- Production companies: Blumhouse Productions; Atomic Monster
- Distributed by: Universal Pictures
- Release dates: December 7, 2022 (Los Angeles); January 6, 2023 (United States)
- Running time: 102 minutes
- Country: United States
- Language: English
- Budget: $12 million
- Box office: $181.8 million

M3GAN (Note: Pronounced "Megan") is a 2022 American science fiction horror film with black comedy elements about an artificially intelligent doll who develops self-awareness and becomes hostile toward anyone who comes between her and her human companion. It was directed by Gerard Johnstone from a screenplay by Akela Cooper, based on a story by Cooper and James Wan. Allison Williams and Violet McGraw star, Amie Donald physically portrays M3GAN, and Jenna Davis voices the character. It is the first installment in the M3GAN film series.

M3GAN premiered in Los Angeles on December 7, 2022, and Universal Pictures theatrically released it in the United States on January 6, 2023. The film grossed over $181 million worldwide against a budget of $12 million and received generally positive reviews from critics, who praised its campy blend of horror and humor. A sequel, M3GAN 2.0, was theatrically released in June 2025, and a spin-off, Soulm8te, was released direct-to-streaming in August 2026.

== Plot ==
After her parents are killed in a car collision, eight-year-old Cady is sent to live with her aunt Gemma, a roboticist at the high-tech Seattle toy company, Funki. Gemma is covertly using the company's resources to develop M3GAN (model 3 generative android), a child-sized humanoid robot doll powered by artificial intelligence, designed to be the ultimate companion for lonely children. During an unsuccessful test of M3GAN in their lab, Gemma's boss, David, discovers the project and orders her to discontinue work on it. Gemma and Cady struggle to connect until Cady comes across Bruce, a motion capture robot that Gemma created at college. Watching Cady with Bruce, Gemma is motivated to complete M3GAN.

When the prototype M3GAN is formally paired with Cady, David is convinced of the project's potential success. M3GAN exceeds expectations and begins to take on a parental role. Gemma's colleagues, Tess and Cole, and Cady's therapist, Lydia, become increasingly concerned about Cady developing an unhealthy emotional attachment to M3GAN. After having a short-circuit after being attacked by Dewey, Celia's dog, M3GAN starts operating more independently and targets anything that she deems a threat to Cady: she kills Dewey, the dog of Gemma's cantankerous neighbor Celia, after he attacks both her and Cady in the front yard. Sometime later, M3GAN attacks Brandon, a boy bullying Cady, by ripping off his ear and chasing him until he falls down a hill onto a road, where he is fatally run over by a passing car.

After Celia harasses Gemma and Cady concerning Dewey's disappearance, M3GAN confronts her the following night and shoots her with a nail gun before fatally spraying her with insecticide. Gemma becomes suspicious of M3GAN and attempts to check her video logs, only to find the files corrupted or deleted. Gemma powers M3GAN off and brings her to the lab, where she, Tess, and Cole attempt to fix her. Cady becomes distraught when separated from M3GAN and slaps Gemma across the face. Gemma apologizes for her inattentiveness and explains to Cady that M3GAN is only a distraction from her loss and not a solution to help her cope.

After watching M3GAN with Cady, Funki's investors greenlight M3GAN's release. Recognizing the risk she poses, Gemma, Tess, and Cole decide to terminate M3GAN. Tess and Cole attempt to shut M3GAN down while Gemma takes Cady home. However, M3GAN activates herself and nearly hangs Cole. While Tess saves Cole, M3GAN causes an explosion in their lab, knocking them out. Before exiting the building, M3GAN kills David and his assistant Kurt in an elevator, staging it as a murder–suicide. She steals a car and drives back to Gemma's house.

M3GAN confronts Gemma, adamant about taking over as Cady's sole caretaker. Gemma attempts to stop M3GAN, damaging and disfiguring her, but M3GAN ultimately overpowers her. Cady saves Gemma, using Bruce to tear M3GAN in half, but M3GAN's top half remains active and attacks Cady. Gemma exposes a processing chip in M3GAN's head, which Cady stabs with a screwdriver, apparently deactivating M3GAN. The authorities arrive with Tess and Cole. As Gemma and Cady exit the house, a camera wired into Gemma's smart-home system powers on and turns towards them.

== Cast ==
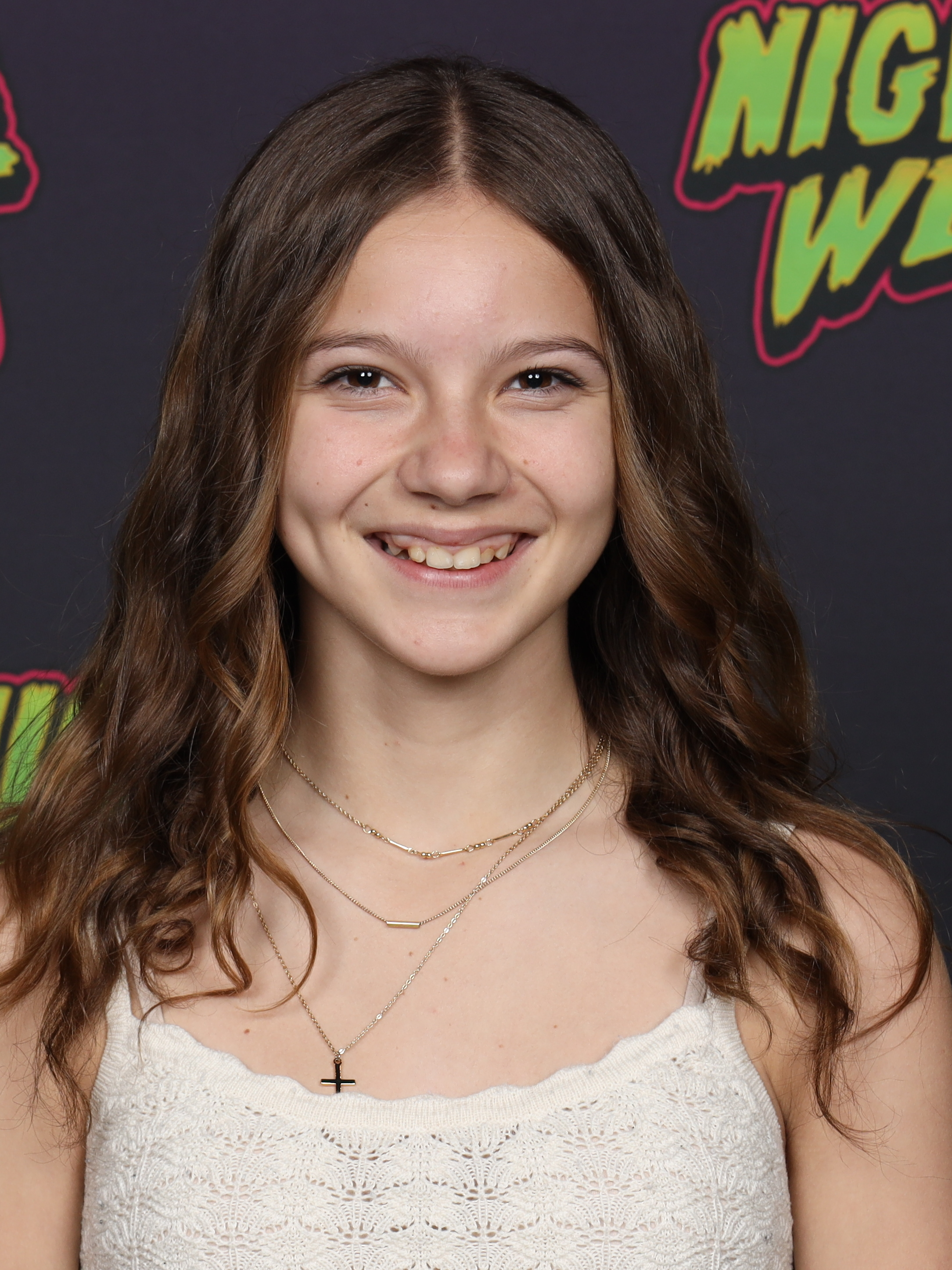
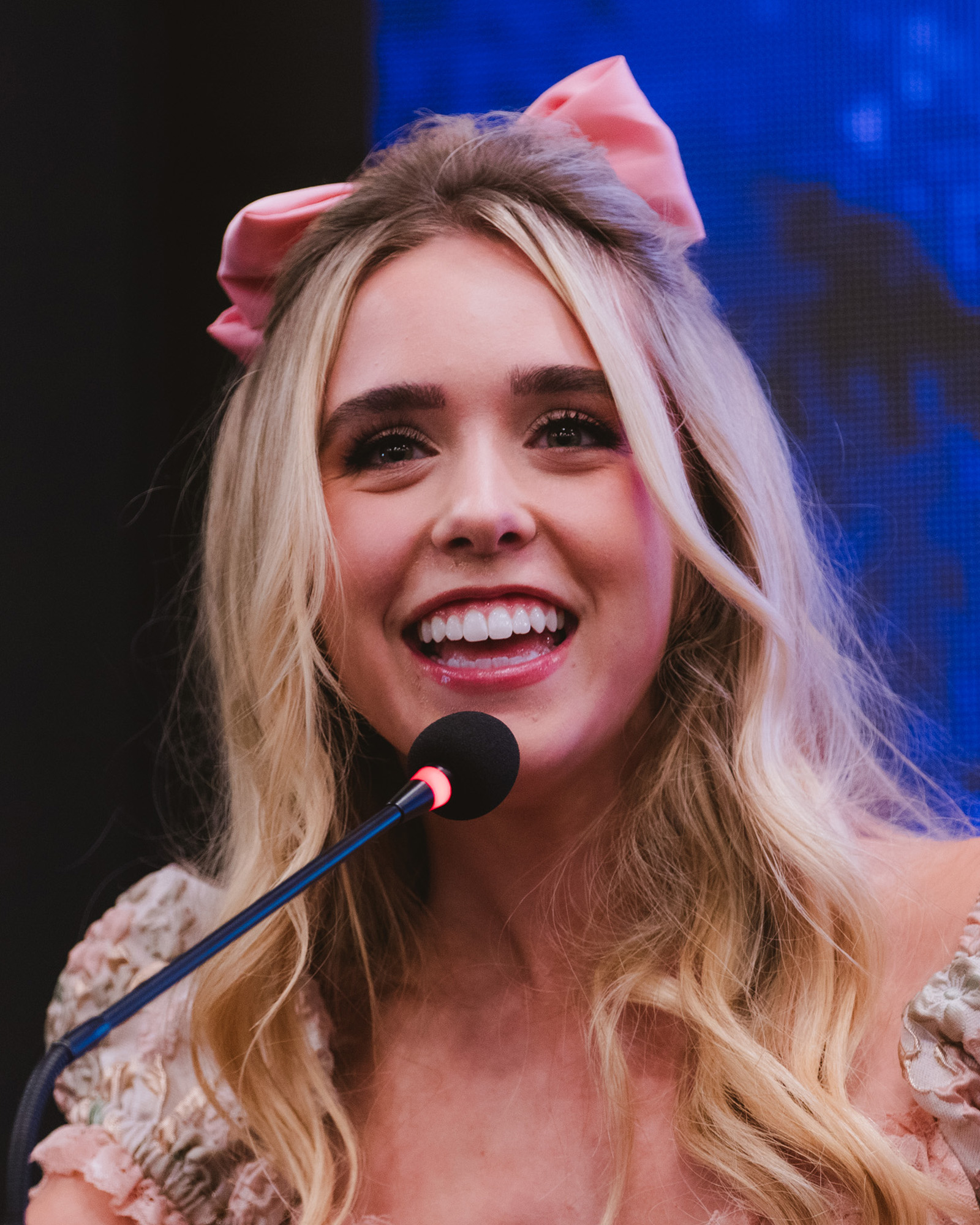
Amie Donald (left) plays M3GAN and Jenna Davis (right) voices M3GAN.
- Allison Williams as Gemma, a roboticist and M3GAN's creator
- Violet McGraw as Cady, Gemma's niece
- Ronny Chieng as David, Gemma's boss
- Amie Donald as M3GAN (model 3 generative android), a powerful AI doll built by Gemma
  - Jenna Davis as the voice of M3GAN
- Brian Jordan Alvarez as Cole, one of Gemma's coworkers
- Jen Van Epps as Tess, one of Gemma's coworkers
- Stephane Garneau-Monten as Kurt, David's assistant who has been stealing company data
- Lori Dungey as Celia, Gemma's neighbor
- Amy Usherwood as Lydia, Cady's therapist
- Jack Cassidy as Brandon, a boy who bullies Cady
- Michael Saccente as Greg
- Samson Chan-Boon as Officer Carter
- Kira Josephson as Ava
- Renee Lyons as Holly, Brandon's mother
- Chelsie Preston Crayford as Nicole, Cady's mother
- Arlo Green as Ryan, Cady's father

== Production ==
=== Development and writing ===
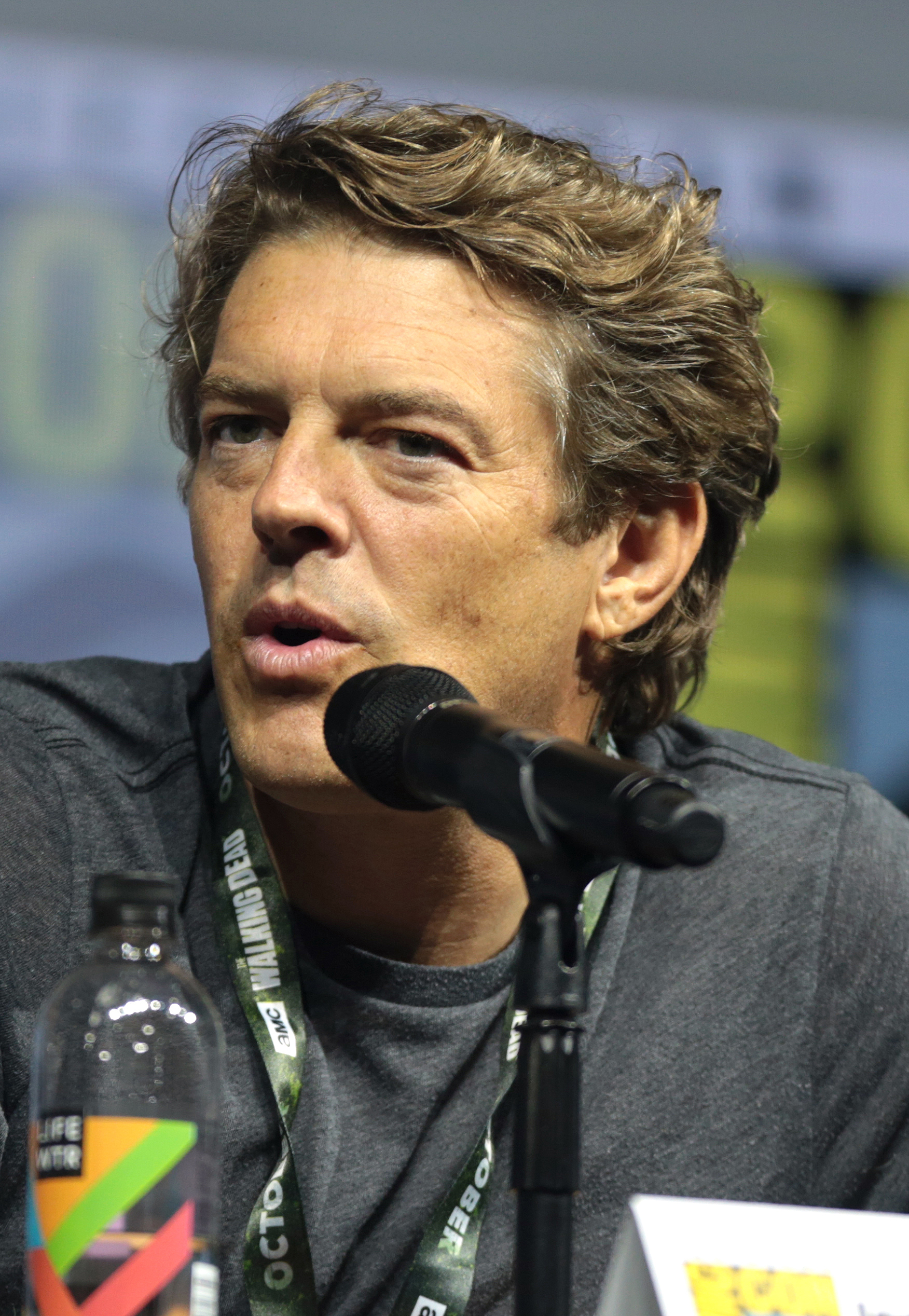
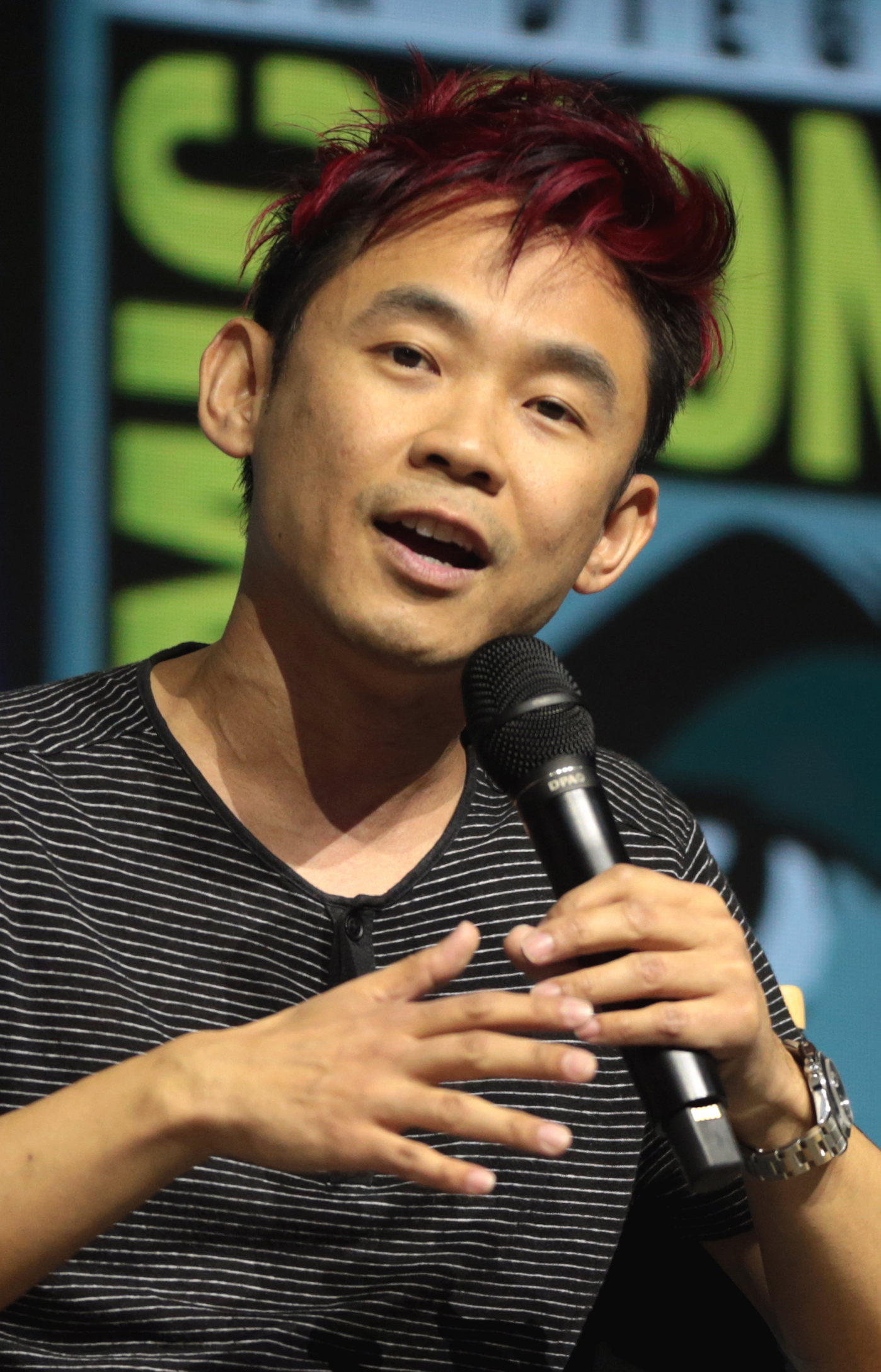
Producers Jason Blum (left) and James Wan (right)

The idea of the film began when Wan's Atomic Monster production company was brainstorming story ideas and chose one about a killer doll. Although Wan's 2014 film Annabelle is about a killer doll, he said, "Pretty much the concept is about embracing technology too much and relying too much on it. And what happens when technology runs amok. It's a commentary on the world we live in and it feels relevant". Blum stated that the film would have black comedy elements which is one reason Johnstone was chosen to direct, saying "We needed someone who can do the thrills and set pieces, but who also has a cheeky approach". Wan admired Johnstone's film Housebound because of his ability to balance the horror and comedy elements by creating a tone that is both frightening and humorous, and this sensibility was essential for M3GAN.

In July 2018, The Hollywood Reporter announced that production was underway for a "techno horror-thriller" titled M3GAN to be produced by James Wan and Jason Blum. Gerard Johnstone was confirmed to direct while Akela Cooper wrote the screenplay and story with Wan. Shooting was scheduled to begin in late 2018.

=== Casting ===
In October 2020, Allison Williams was cast in the leading role, followed by Violet McGraw in April 2021, and Ronny Chieng the following month.

=== Filming ===
On a budget of $12 million, principal photography began in June 2021 and took place in Los Angeles, California, and Auckland, New Zealand. The suburbs of Auckland were utilized to lend the film a "Denver, Colorado, type feel". Filming was completed by mid-August right before a COVID-19 lockdown occurred in New Zealand. The film underwent reshoots in post-production in order to secure a PG-13 rating from the Motion Picture Association, after the original cut was deemed too violent.

=== Visual effects ===
Adrien Morot and Kathy Tse of Morot FX Studio created an animatronic puppet version of M3GAN that was used for dialogue and close-ups. There was also a second animatronic used for certain scenes, as well as a possible stunt version of M3GAN that was not puppeteered. The animatronic M3GAN was puppeteered via a variety of techniques, which included radio-controlled facial expressions performed by Morot and Tse in tandem, automated lip-sync for the dialogue (temp guide tracks were provided during filming by New Zealand actress Kimberley Crossman) and a puppeteer physically moving M3GAN's head and body.

Amie Donald performed M3GAN's scenes that called for physical movement the puppet could not do, and also performed her own stunts. Donald received movement coaching from Jed Brophy and Luke Hawker in portraying M3GAN's agility. On set Donald wore a static silicone M3GAN mask created by Morot FX and this was later replaced by a CGI version of M3GAN's face to match that of the animatronic.

In post-production, Donald's physical performance as M3GAN was enhanced by digital visual effects by the New Zealand–based visual effects studio Wētā Workshop. Speaking about the design of M3GAN, Johnstone stated that he "looked to screen icons from the '50s like Audrey Hepburn, Grace Kelly and Kim Novak for inspiration. But I wanted some '70s naturalism to counteract her synthetic nature, so the hair is one hundred percent Peggy Lipton."

=== Music ===
Anthony Willis composed the score for the film. The soundtrack was later released through Back Lot Music on January 6, 2022.

== Release ==
M3GAN had its world premiere at the TCL Chinese Theatre in Los Angeles on December 7, 2022, and was released theatrically in the United States on January 6, 2023. It was originally scheduled to be released on January 13, 2023, before being moved up a week in order to avoid competition with House Party and the wide expansion of A Man Called Otto, which were also scheduled for January 13.

=== Marketing ===
The teaser poster for the film was unveiled at the 2022 CinemaCon. The first trailer was released on October 11, 2022, set to Taylor Swift's "It's Nice to Have a Friend". After its premiere, a scene of M3GAN dancing became an Internet meme and gained widespread attention on social media platforms like TikTok (under the hashtag #M3gandance). The viral moment helped to build buzz for the film's release. The second and final trailer was released on December 7, 2022, set to Bella Poarch's "Dolls". In the final film, M3GAN dances to "Walk the Night" by Skatt Brothers. On January 8, 2023, Williams revealed that she and the marketing team at Universal had debated whether to include the scene in the trailer or save it for when audiences saw the film in theaters. She told The Hollywood Reporter, "When we saw the first cut of the trailer, we were all hemming and hawing about whether or not to let the dance be out in the trailer or try to keep it as a surprise in the movie ... And boy, the forces of marketing at Universal were right to keep it in the trailer, because it just helped, honestly."

=== Home media ===
M3GAN premiered on the streaming service Peacock on February 24, 2023. The DVD and Blu-ray were released on March 21, 2023, with all formats receiving an unrated version.

== Reception ==
=== Box office ===
M3GAN grossed $95.2 million in the United States and Canada, and $86.6 million in other territories, for a worldwide gross of $181.8 million. Deadline Hollywood calculated the net profit of the film to be $78.8 million, when factoring together all expenses and revenues.

In the United States and Canada, M3GAN was initially projected to gross $17–20 million from 3,509 theaters in its opening weekend. After making $11.7 million on its first day (including $2.75 million from Thursday night previews), estimates were increased to $27.5 million. It went on to debut to $30.4 million, finishing in second place at the box office behind holdover Avatar: The Way of Water. The film made $18.3 million in its second weekend, remaining in second. In its third and fourth weekends the film made $9.7 million and $6.4 million, finishing in third and fourth place, respectively.

=== Critical response ===
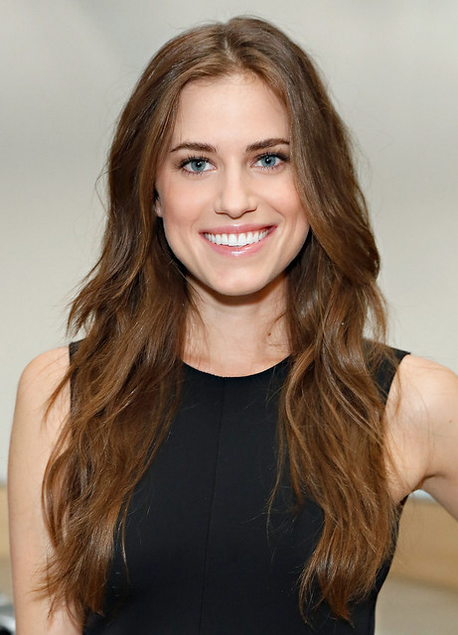
Allison Williams received praise for playing Gemma.

On the review aggregator website Rotten Tomatoes, the film has an approval rating of 93% based on 315 reviews and an average rating of 7.2/10. The website's critical consensus reads: "Unapologetically silly and all the more entertaining for it, M3GAN is the rare horror-comedy that delivers chuckles as effortlessly as chills". On Metacritic, the film has a weighted average score of 72 out of 100 based on 54 critics, indicating "generally favorable" reviews. Audiences polled by CinemaScore gave the film an average grade of B on an A+ to F scale, while those polled at PostTrak gave it 3.5 out of 5 stars.

Variety's Owen Gleiberman called M3GAN "a diverting genre film, one that possesses a healthy sense of its own absurdity", and wrote that the film satirizes "all of us – or, at least, those who now think of the mirror offered by artificial intelligence as an actual form of interaction." David Rooney of The Hollywood Reporter commended the physical and voice performances of Donald and Davis, respectively, as well as the visual effects work used to depict M3GAN; Rooney wrote that the film's "shocks and scares and even the cautionary notes are not lessened by the enjoyable vein of campy humor." The Independent's Clarisse Loughrey gave the film a score of four out of five stars, writing that "Under the canny, high-spirited direction of Gerard Johnstone, [...] it's incisive, sardonic, and totally mean-spirited. A perfect mix. Maybe it's not as shocking as Malignant, but it feels exactly like watching Mean Girls's queen bee Regina George if someone had given her a knife and a death wish."

Peter Bradshaw of The Guardian awarded the film three out of five stars, calling it a "cheekily enjoyable chiller" and writing: "Derivative though M3GAN undoubtedly is, [...] there are some adroit satirical touches about dolls as toxic aspirational templates, dolls as parodies of intimacy and sensitivity and tech itself as sinister child-pacification, with kids given iPads the way Victorian children were given alcoholic gripe water." Meagan Navarro of Bloody Disgusting similarly praised the effects and performance work involved in depicting M3GAN, and complimented the film's humor, but called the trajectory of the narrative "well-telegraphed" and added, "Save for a few jump scares, there's an overt restraint with the horror. The PG-13 rating also dampens what kills we do get. Those looking for the unexpected likely won't find it here, though that doesn't make it any less fun." USA Today's Brian Truitt gave the film three out of four stars, also lauding its effects and satirical elements. A.A. Dowd of Chron.com noted the presence of "some real ideas trickling through the film's B-movie code", and wrote that, "if the film is rarely very frightening (the kill scenes [...] lack both suspense and true holy-shit grisliness), it often works like gangbusters as an over-the-top horror comedy whose fun rests on a toy box full of priceless leering-doll reaction shots and cutting remarks."

The New York Times' Jason Zinoman noted the film as featuring "some absurd dialogue" and a "by-the-book conclusion", but commended its tone and wrote that Johnstone "doesn't go for elaborate suspense sequences or truly intense scares. He wants to please, not rattle. And while there are some hints at social commentary on how modern mothers and fathers use technology to outsource parenting, this movie is smart enough to never take itself too seriously." Tyler Doupe of Dread Central gave the film three out of five stars, lamenting its horror elements as lacking and its human characters as "somewhat two-dimensional", but writing that its comedic elements, "combined with the eventual build to an exciting conclusion, made the film worth my time." Randy Myers of The Mercury News gave the film two out of four stars, writing that it "stocks up on jump scares and keeps the violence PG-13, but fails to make us care about any of the humans in the path of M3GAN."

M3GAN has been described as a gay icon or a queer icon. Erik Piepenburg of The New York Times wrote that "women like M3gan, the gorgeous and loyal but messy and insolent ones", are the type of women gay men are protective of. Jack King of GQ described M3GAN as being "factory made" as a queer icon, such as the use of gay-friendly terminology on Twitter. Screenwriter Akela Cooper, in an interview with SFX Magazine, attributed the gay icon status to the "found family" motif of the film, though Asyia Iftikhar of PinkNews attributed it to M3GAN's campiness.

=== Accolades ===
At the 2023 MTV Movie & TV Awards, M3GAN was nominated for Best Villain (M3GAN). The film was nominated in three categories at the 2023 Golden Trailer Awards: "Family" (Inside Job) for Best Horror, and "Bringing Life To M3GAN" (The Fabulous Group) and "Meet M3GAN" (Paradise Creative) for Best Digital – Horror / Thriller. It won the Best Digital – Horror/Thriller category for "Getting Hacked". M3GAN won Best Horror at the 6th Hollywood Critics Association Midseason Film Awards. At the 51st Saturn Awards, the film received two nominations: Best Science Fiction Film and Best Performance by a Younger Actor.

In 2024, the film won Campiest Flick honors from GALECA: The Society of LGBTQ Entertainment Critics via the group's Dorian Awards, where it was also nominated for Genre Film of the Year.

== Franchise ==
A sequel, M3GAN 2.0, was released on June 27, 2025 with Williams and McGraw returning as Gemma and Cady, respectively, along with Johnstone to direct and co-wrote the film with Cooper.

A spin-off titled Soulm8te was released on August 1, 2026 through Universal Pictures Home Entertainment, with Kate Dolan directing and rewriting the screenplay based on a previous draft written by Rafael Jordan.

=== Future ===
In December 2024, Johnstone stated that there were ongoing discussions with all the creatives involved in the first three films to continue with additional installments. The director stated he would like to see a future M3GAN sequel, with the android character among a dystopian future in the style of the Mad Max franchise, acknowledging that one day the concept may be explored in a future story. Allison Williams expressed interest in developing additional spin-offs following the release of SOULM8TE, stating she would like to see each of the installments culminate in a crossover movie. Comparing the idea to a Marvel Cinematic Universe–style movie, the actress asked what the primary antagonist of such a project would be, saying: "What is the Thanos equivalent?"
