= Allison Williams =

American actress (born 1988)

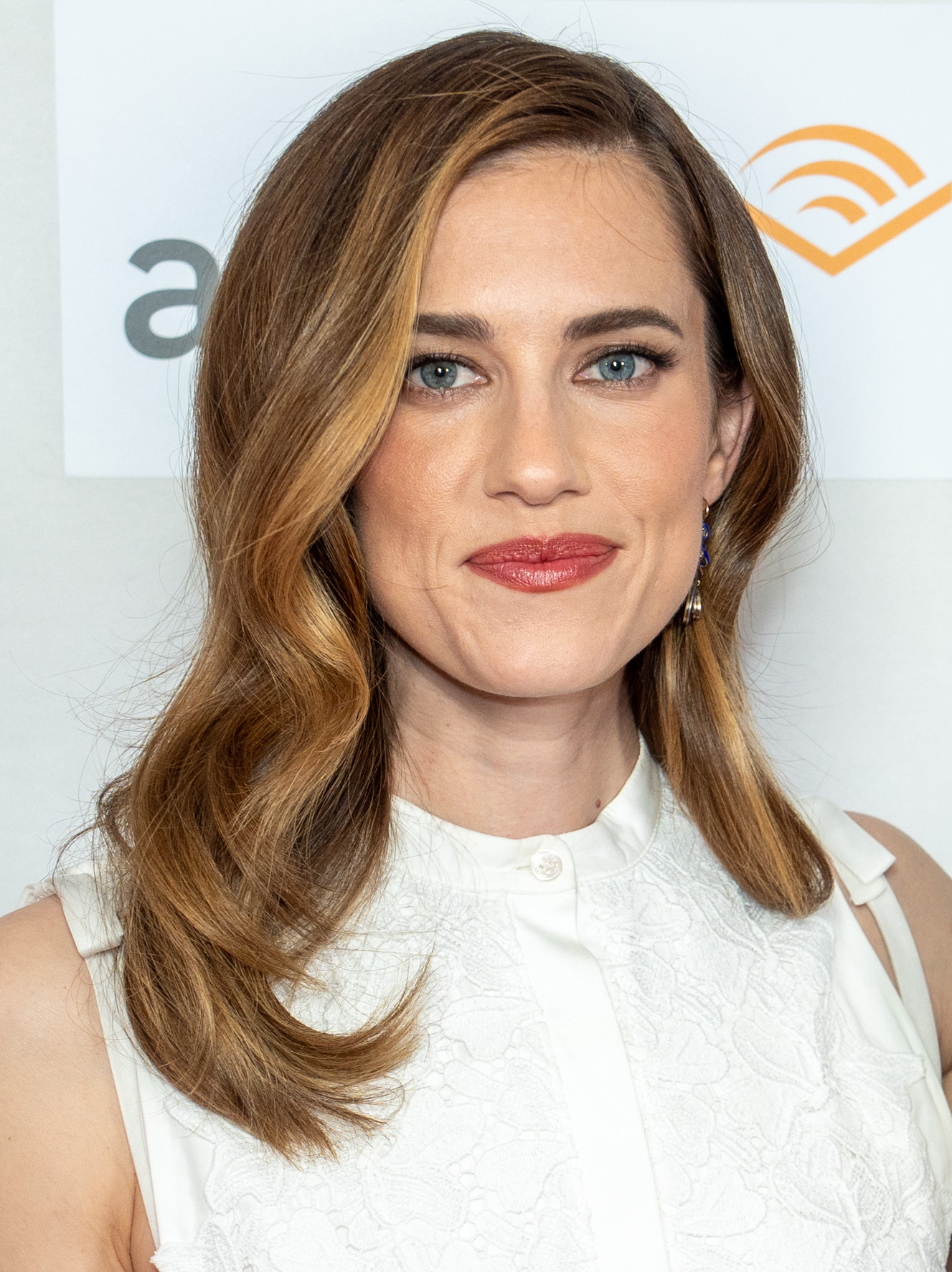
- Williams at the 2025 Tribeca Festival
- Born: April 13, 1988 (age 38); Hartford, Connecticut, U.S.
- Education: Yale University (BA)
- Occupations: actress; producer
- Years active: 2004–present
- Spouses: Ricky Van Veen (m. 2015; div. 2019); Alexander Dreymon (m. 2023)
- Children: 1
- Father: Brian Williams

Allison Howell Williams (born April 13, 1988) is an American actress and film producer. She began her career in comedy and rose to prominence as a horror queen beginning in the late 2010s. Her accolades include a National Board of Review Award and nominations at the Critics' Choice, GMSA and SAG Awards.

After performing on YouTube and with the improv troupe Just Add Water, Williams gained her first starring lead role as Marnie Michaels in the comedy drama series Girls (2012–2017). She rose to wider prominence for co-starring in the psychological horror film Get Out (2017), and the science fiction horror films M3GAN (2022) and M3GAN 2.0 (2025)—both of which she produced. She also starred in the psychological horror film The Perfection (2018), the historical series Fellow Travelers (2023) and the romantic drama film Regretting You (2025).

== Early life and education ==
Allison Howell Williams was born on April 13, 1988, in Hartford, Connecticut, and raised in New Canaan, Connecticut. She is the daughter of former NBC Nightly News anchor and managing editor Brian Williams and TV producer Jane Gillan Stoddard. She has a younger brother Doug, the WCBS-TV reporter and anchor and former late-night anchor of Geico SportsNite on SportsNet New York.

Williams attended New Canaan Country School and Greenwich Academy. She later attended Yale University majoring in English; she was a member of Morse College and the St. Elmo Society. In 2010, Yale made a "That's Why I Chose Yale" promotional video featuring (among others) Williams, whose contribution went viral. She graduated from Yale with a bachelor's degree in English in 2010.

== Career ==
=== 2004–2016: Early work and television breakthrough ===
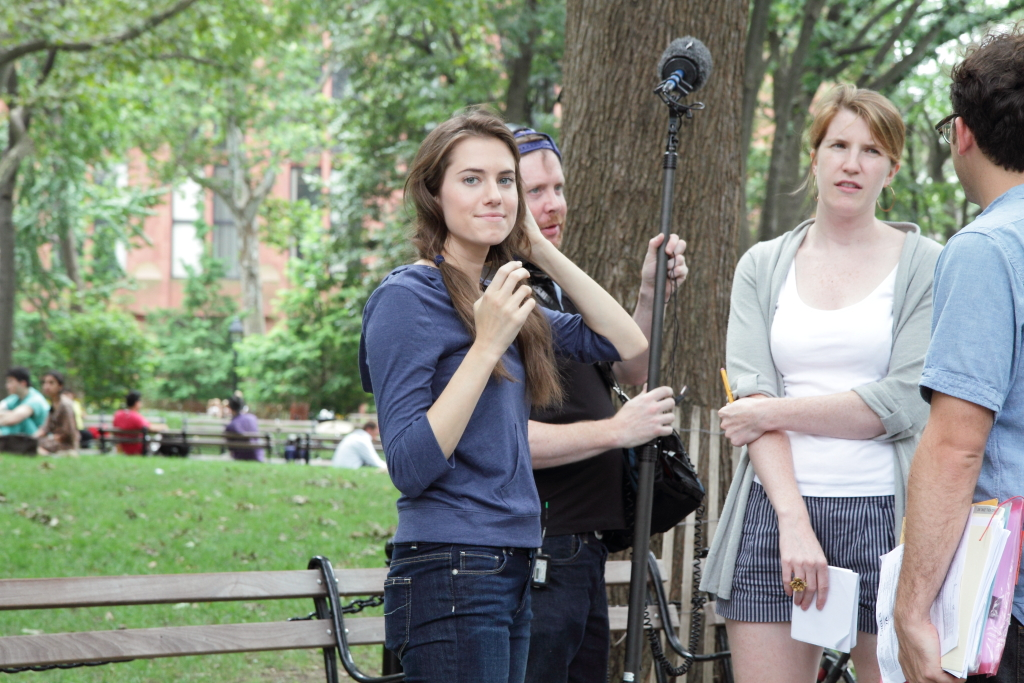
Williams on the set of Girls in 2012

Williams began her career as a member of the improv comedy troupe Just Add Water, working with them for four years and acting in the YouTube series College Musical. The project featured Sam Tsui and was directed by Kurt Hugo Schneider, both of whom also attended Yale.

"If I was cast on Girls now, the experience would be much more stressful, [...] We were so young and it was loud in the way of watercooler and thinkpieces [sic] and Gawker was, like, obsessed with us and it was the heyday of that kind of thing but I didn't have any sense of how to calibrate how big any of it really was."

— Williams speaking of her Girls casting in 2023

In 2010, Williams performed a mashup of "Nature Boy" set to RJD2's "A Beautiful Mine", the theme song for the television series Mad Men. The YouTube video of the performance received widespread praise on the Internet. After seeing Williams' mashup, Judd Apatow was convinced to cast Williams in the HBO series Girls. The series premiered on April 15, 2012, and generated high praise from television critics but sparked many controversies. Williams was nominated for Best Supporting Actress in a Comedy Series at the 22nd Critics' Choice Awards.

From 2011 to 2012, Williams appeared as Cheryl in the CollegeHumor series Jake and Amir. On December 4, 2014, she starred in the title role on NBC's live television presentation of the musical Peter Pan Live!, opposite Christopher Walken as Captain Hook. In November 2016, Williams appeared in Past Forward, a short film collaboration between David O. Russell and Prada. Williams wrote a series of Funny or Die sketches starring as newlywed Kate Middleton, with English actor and model Oliver Jackson-Cohen as Prince William, Duke of Cambridge.

=== 2017–present: Mainstream recognition ===
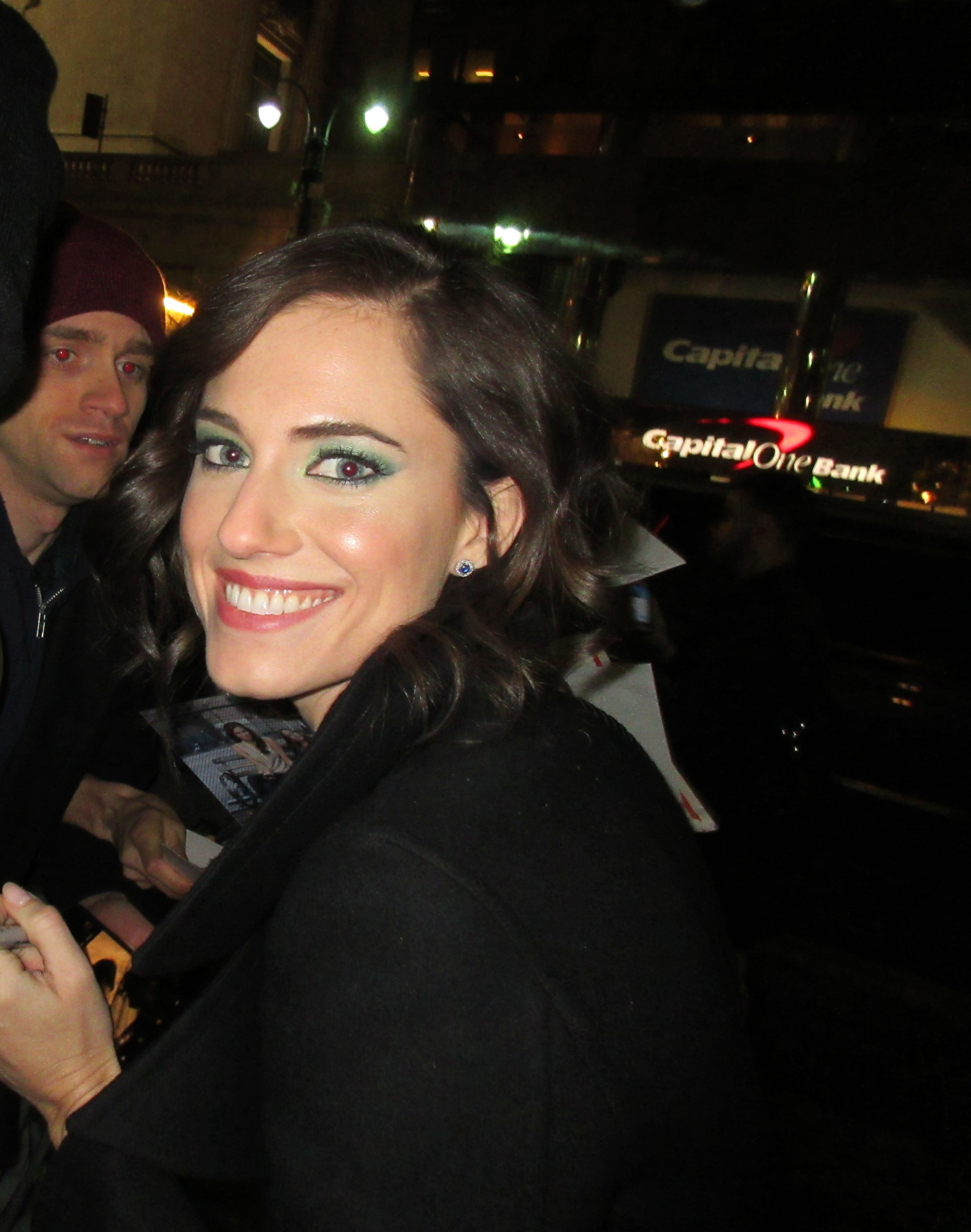
Williams signing autographs in 2018

In 2017, Williams starred in the horror film Get Out, which was her feature film debut. Director Jordan Peele was convinced she was right for the role of Rose after seeing her performance in Peter Pan Live! and cast her in order to "disorient audiences". Williams said that she had been "looking for a role that would weaponize everything that people take for granted about me. So I instantly signed on to it." To prepare for the role, Williams isolated herself from the cast and crew during production in order to understand the psychopathic nature of her character. The film received critical acclaim, and the performances of the acting ensemble were praised. Johnny Hoffman of MovieWeb praised her for being "suspicious and charming from beginning to end" and wrote that "Williams proved, with this character, that she is perfectly capable of portraying an effective villain." The film earned her several accolades, including nominations for the MTV Award for Best Villain and the Screen Actors Guild Award for Outstanding Performance by a Cast in a Motion Picture.

That same year, Williams was cast in the role of Charlotte on the Netflix horror film The Perfection, released on May 24, 2019, to mixed reviews though her performance was called "compelling". In 2018, she was cast as Kit Snicket in the Netflix comedy-drama series A Series of Unfortunate Events, a recurring character throughout the show's second and third seasons. Two years later, Williams appeared in the Swedish thriller film Horizon Line.

Three years after Get Out, Williams reteamed with Blumhouse to executive produce and star in M3GAN. She plays Gemma, a roboticist and creator of the titular robot. The film was released on January 6, 2023, to commercial success, becoming the second highest-grossing film of her career. Williams was also critically lauded for her performance. Jason Zinoman of The New York Times said that she had a "knack for playing it straight" and further wrote that she "capably updates the mad-scientist archetype, refusing to pause and ask questions while inventing a doll of the future, one who pairs with a child and adjusts to their needs, filling in as best friend and big sister." Fletcher Peters of The Daily Beast wrote that Williams "conquers her role" and further praised her ability "to play off the absurdity with such finesse is incredible [...] Williams excels in the gruesome scenes just as well as she does with the comedy". Kristy Puchko of Mashable said that she "solidly grounds the human drama within this scary sci-fi premise of a killer doll." Also in 2023, Williams starred in the miniseries Fellow Travelers.

Williams was announced in early 2022 to reprise the role of Gemma in M3GAN 2.0, which she would also produce. The film was released in June 2025 and failed to replicate the success of its predecessor; however, The Hollywood Reporter's David Rooney believed it gave Williams an opportunity to "step into the fray with gusto". Her next film, Regretting You (2025), was a commercial success but was panned by critics. Adrian Horton of The Guardian believed it wasted having Williams in the lead.

== Personal life and public image ==
At a dinner hosted by Glamour magazine in January 2015 to celebrate her upcoming February cover, she posed for photographs alongside her younger brother Douglas Williams and was overheard reminding a photographer that he was not her fiancé, adding that the photographer is not the first to make the mixup.

She and her fiancé, Ricky Van Veen, the co-founder of CollegeHumor, were married on September 19, 2015, in a private ceremony in Saratoga, Wyoming. Tom Hanks officiated the ceremony.

In a February 2017 appearance on the NBC late-night talk show Late Night with Seth Meyers while promoting her film Get Out, she explained that, because photo agencies mistake her younger brother for her husband so often whenever the two of them walk a red carpet together at public events, she must repeatedly correct photographers before pictures are taken. She added that her younger brother makes an ideal stand-in for these appearances because her husband Van Veen disliked participating in large-scale red carpet events.

On June 27, 2019, Van Veen and Williams released a joint statement announcing their separation.

In late 2019, Williams began dating German actor Alexander Dreymon, whom she met while filming Horizon Line. In late 2021, they had a son. In December 2022, it was reported that the couple had become engaged. In June 2025, it was announced that the couple had married quietly in 2023.

Following her roles in Get Out, The Perfection and the M3GAN films, Williams was deemed a horror queen by several media outlets. In 2025, The Guardian deemed her "an underrated actor".

== Filmography ==
=== Film ===
Year	Title	Role	Notes	Ref.
2016	Past Forward	Woman #1	Short film	
2017	Get Out	Rose Armitage		
2018	The Perfection	Charlotte Willmore		
2020	Horizon Line	Sara Johnson		
2022	M3GAN	Gemma Forrester	Also executive producer	
2025	M3GAN 2.0	Gemma Forrester	Also producer	
2025	Regretting You	Morgan Grant	Also executive producer	
2026	Kill Me	Margot	Also executive producer	
2026	Soulm8te	—N/a	Also executive producer	
TBA	Tangled Up in Blue	TBA	Post-production	
TBA	Homewrecker	TBA	Post-production	

=== Television ===
Year	Title	Role	Notes	Ref.
2004	American Dreams	Deborah	2 episodes	
2011	Will & Kate: Before Happily Ever After	Kate Middleton	Also writer; recurring role	
2011	The League	Danielle	Episode: "The Guest Bong"	
2011–2012	Jake and Amir	Cheryl	2 episodes	
2012–2017	Girls	Marnie Michaels	Main role	
2013	The Mindy Project	Jillian	3 episodes	
2014	Peter Pan Live!	Peter Pan	Television special	
2015	The Simpsons	Candace's friend	Voice; Episode: "Every Man's Dream"	
2018	Patrick Melrose	Marianne	Episode: "Bad News"	
2018–2019	A Series of Unfortunate Events	Kit Snicket	Recurring role	
2019	Sesame Street	Sanitation Worker	Episode: "Oscar Uncanned"	
2023	Saturday Night Live	Herself	Episode: "Aubrey Plaza/Sam Smith"	
2023	Fellow Travelers	Lucy Smith	Miniseries; main role	

== Awards and nominations ==
Year	Award	Category	Nominated work	Result	Ref(s)
2015	Guild of Music Supervisors Awards	Best Song Written and/or Recorded for Television	Girls	Nominated	
2016	Critics' Choice Television Awards	Best Supporting Actress in a Comedy Series	Girls	Nominated	
2017	Florida Film Critics Circle	Best Ensemble Acting	Get Out	Nominated	
2017	Fright Meter Awards	Best Actress in a Supporting Role	Get Out	Nominated	
2017	IGN Awards	Best Supporting Performer in a Movie	Get Out	Nominated	
2017	MTV Movie & TV Awards	Best Villain	Get Out	Nominated	
2017	National Board of Review	Best Acting by an Ensemble	Get Out	Won	
2017	Online Film Critics Society	Best Ensemble	Get Out	Nominated	
2017	San Diego Film Critics Society	Best Performance by an Ensemble	Get Out	Nominated	
2017	Seattle Film Critics Society	Best Ensemble Cast	Get Out	Won	
2018	AARP Movies for Grownups Awards	Best Ensemble	Get Out	Won	
2018	Georgia Film Critics Association	Best Ensemble	Get Out	Nominated	
2018	Screen Actors Guild Awards	Outstanding Performance by a Cast in a Motion Picture	Get Out	Nominated	
