= Jenna Davis =

American actress and singer (born 2004)

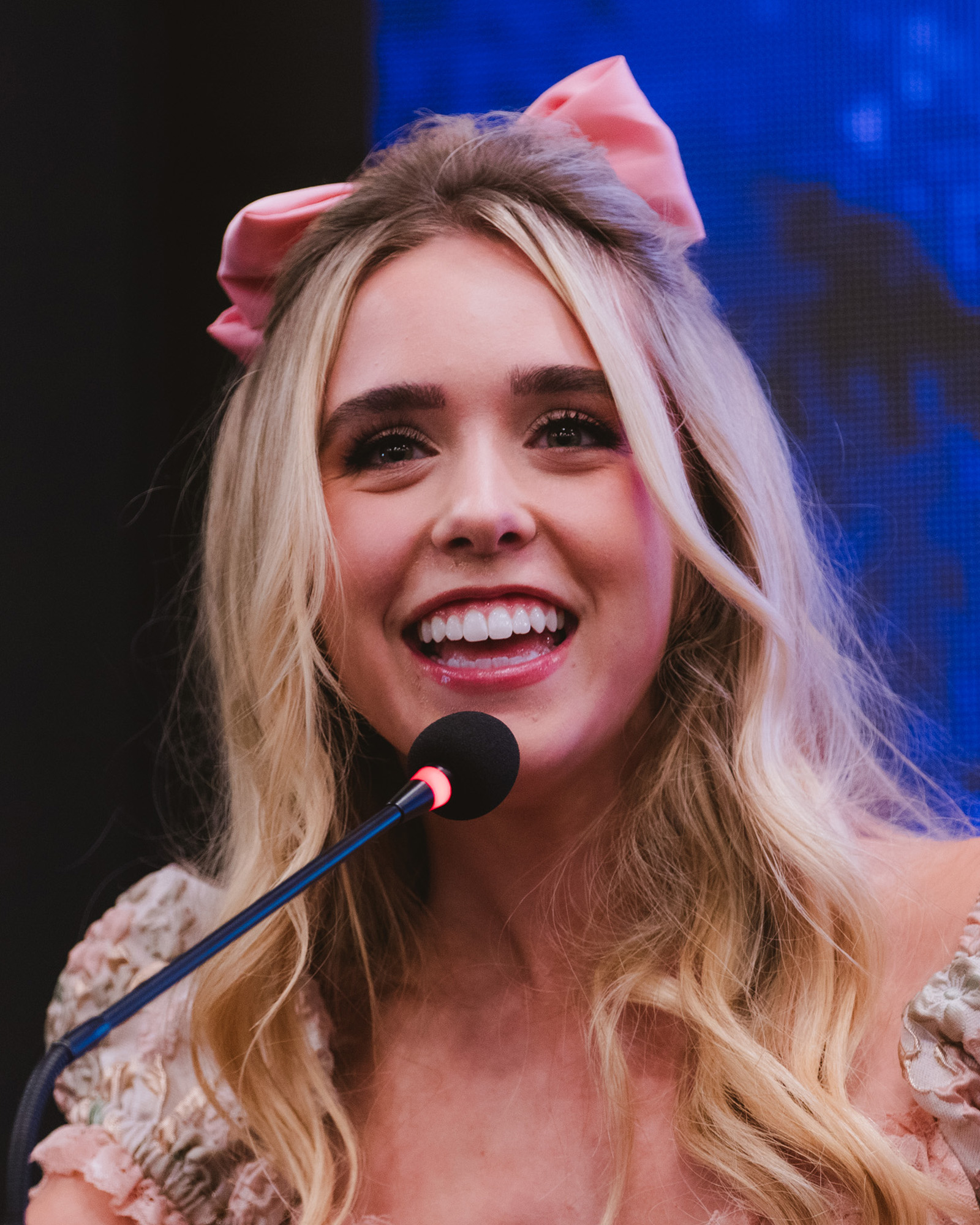
- Davis in 2025
- Born: May 5, 2004 (age 22); Plano, Texas, U.S.
- Occupations: Actress; singer-songwriter; Internet personality
- Years active: 2014–present
- Partner(s): Jakson Berman (2026–present; engaged)
- Relatives: Gene Autry (great-granduncle)

Jenna Davis (born May 5, 2004) is an American actress, Internet personality, and singer-songwriter. She is best known for voicing the titular character of the horror film M3GAN (2022) and its sequel, M3GAN 2.0 (2025). As a child actress, she had recurring roles on the Brat network (2017–2019, 2021) and the Disney Channel series Raven's Home (2018–2019). Her voice work includes Treehouse Detectives (2018) and Vampirina (2018–2020).

== Early life ==
Davis was born in Plano, Texas and spent her early childhood in Frisco before moving to Minnesota when she was four. She began traveling to Los Angeles for auditions at the age of 10 and made the official move the following year in 2015. As of January 2023, Davis was studying at Pasadena City College. In August 2026, Davis became engaged to Jakson Berman. She confirmed the engagement on August 14, 2026, following a proposal during a tropical vacation.

== Career ==
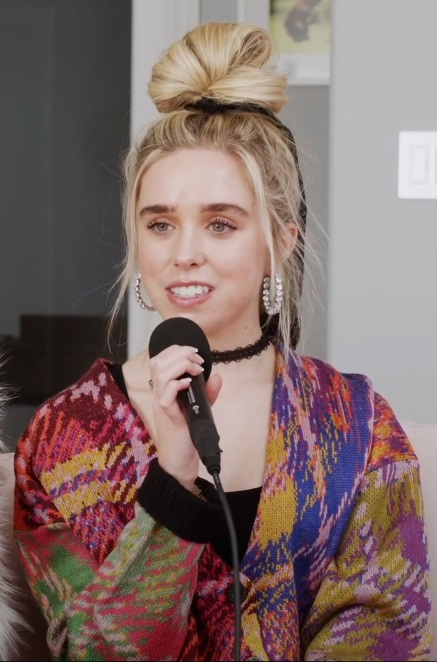
Davis in 2023

Davis appeared in a number of short films and uploaded her first YouTube video in 2015. In 2017, she began appearing in the Brat web series Chicken Girls as Monica, a member of the rival dance team Power Surge. Davis would reprise her role as Monica in Chicken Girls: The Movie, the 2018 prequel series A Girl Named Jo (narrated by the character's grandmother), and the 2021 miniseries Scarlett's Lab. She also made a guest appearance in Afterschooled and played Maddy in the now defunct series Keys.

Also in 2017, Davis had her first voice role in two episodes of The Last Tycoon. This was followed by her live-action television debut in 2018 when she guest starred in an episode of the TV Land sitcom Teachers and landed the recurring role of Sienna in the Disney Channel series Raven's Home, a That's So Raven spin-off. That same year, Davis voiced Teri in the Netflix series Treehouse Detectives and various characters in the Disney Channel series Vampirina.

In December 2022, the science fiction horror film M3GAN premiered in Los Angeles, marking Davis' feature film debut as she voiced the titular robot doll. Davis has over 2 million subscribers on her YouTube channel and over 4 million followers on TikTok. Davis released the single "DiCaprio" in August 2023 as the flagship artist of the new record label SMACKRecords. Described as country pop, the song was written by Kelsea Ballerini, Walker Hayes, and Ross Copperman. In 2024, Davis featured in Lisa Frankenstein. She later released her debut extended play Sike that year. She released the album Where Did That Girl Go? on June 27, 2025.

== Filmography ==
=== Film ===
Year	Title	Role	Notes
2022	M3GAN	M3GAN	Voice
2024	Lisa Frankenstein	Lori	
2025	M3GAN 2.0	M3GAN	Voice

=== Television ===
Year	Title	Role	Episodes
2017	The Last Tycoon	Sally Sweet	Singing voice role; 2 episodes
2018	Teachers	Ashley	1 episode
2018	Sofia the First	Fairy	Voice role; 1 episode
2018	Mr. Neighbor's House	Ingrid	1 episode
2018	Treehouse Detectives	Teri	Main voice role
2018–2019	Raven's Home	Sienna	Recurring role, 7 episodes
2018–2020	Vampirina	Various	13 episodes
2020	Infinity Train	Various	3 episodes
2022	Maggie	Meg	1 episode
2024	9-1-1	Brooke	1 episode
2025	Night Court	Pandora	1 episode
2025	Vampirina: Teenage Vampire	Megan	Recurring Character

=== Web ===
Year	Title	Role	Episodes
2017–2018	Chicken Girls	Monica	Recurring roles (season 1–2), 14 episodes
2018	Chicken Girls: The Movie	Monica	Special
2018	Afterschooled	Monica	1 episode
2018	Keys	Maddy	6 episodes
2018–2019	A Girl Named Jo	Monica	5 episodes
2021	Scarlett's Lab	Monica	Miniseries; 4 episodes

== Discography ==
=== Albums ===
Title	Release date	No. of Songs	Notes
Where Did That Girl Go?	June 27, 2025	8	Debut album

=== EPs ===
Title	Release date	No. of Songs	Notes
Sike	November 1, 2024	5	

=== Singles ===
Title	Release date	Album	Notes
"Breathing Fire"	September 11, 2016	Non-album single	First single released
"Summer of 19"	November 22, 2019	Non-album single	
"Under the Surface"	February 21, 2020	Non-album single	
"16"	September 25, 2020	Non-album single	
"Boy You'll Miss Me"	January 3, 2021	Non-album single	
"Not Saying Sorry"	April 2, 2021	Non-album single	
"Player"	May 29, 2021	Non-album single	
"Maybe Maybe"	August 28, 2021	Non-album single	
"Look Who's Back"	April 3, 2022	Non-album single	
"1963"	September 24, 2022	Non-album single	Final independently released single
"DiCaprio"	August 11, 2023	Non-album single	First release with SMACK Records
"6FT Nothing"	June 21, 2024	Sike	Lead single from debut EP
"FBI"	August 9, 2024	Sike	Second single from debut EP
"Magenta Fire"	September 27, 2024		
"Luckier"	October 4, 2024		Third single / promotional single from debut EP
“Dear Santa”	November 29, 2025		First Christmas Single
"On A Budget"	March 14, 2025	Where Did That Girl Go	
"Miss Wannabe"	April 18, 2025	Where Did That Girl Go	
“San Diego”	May 30, 2025	Where Did That Girl Go	
“Where Did That Girl Go”	June 27, 2025	Where Did That Girl Go	
“Messy”	June 27, 2025	Where Did That Girl Go	
“Fake Flowers”	June 27, 2025	Where Did That Girl Go	
“Fun Dip”	June 27, 2025	Where Did That Girl Go	
“Actor”	June 27, 2025	Where Did That Girl Go	
“Entertainment Tonight”	April 10, 2026		
“Hey Girly”	May 29, 2026		
“The Summer I Turned Petty”	July 17, 2026		
“No Place Like Home”	September 11, 2026		
