= Anthony Willis (film composer) =

British film score composer

- Born: Anthony Brian Willis; London, England
- Occupations: Composer, Musician
- Website: anthonybwillis.com

Anthony Brian Willis is a British film composer and musician specializing in soundtracks for film and television. He is known for composing the music for Promising Young Woman (2020), M3GAN (2022), and Saltburn (2023). Willis received BAFTA nominations for Best Original Film Music for both Promising Young Woman and Saltburn.

== Early life and education ==
Willis was born in London, England. He began his musical training in the choir of St George's Chapel, Windsor Castle. He studied composition at Marlborough College in Wilshire and later at the University of Bristol. He completed his graduate studies in Film Scoring at the University of Southern California.

== Career ==
Willis is a composer with Remote Control Productions, the company founded by composer Hans Zimmer. As a leading composer, he wrote the film scores for Promising Young Woman (2020), M3GAN (2022), and Saltburn (2023).

== Personal life ==
Willis lives in Venice Beach, California.

== Selected works ==
- Promising Young Woman (2020)
- M3GAN (2022)
- Saltburn (2023)
- Wuthering Heights (2026)
- Soulm8te (2026)

== Awards and nominations ==
Willis received two BAFTA nominations for Best Original Film Music:

- 2021—Promising Young Woman
- 2024—Saltburn
