= Kate Dolan =

Irish filmmaker

- Born: Dublin, Ireland
- Occupations: Director; writer
- Years active: 2010–present
- Notable work: You Are Not My Mother; Soulm8te
- Relatives: Michael Keegan-Dolan (uncle)
- Website: katedolan.net

Kate Dolan (born 1991) is an Irish filmmaker. She is known for directing the horror films You Are Not My Mother (2021) and Soulm8te (2026).

== Early life and education ==
Dolan grew up in North Dublin. She graduated from IADT in 2012 with an Honours Degree in Film & Television Production. Her graduate film Breathe In (2012) was selected for a number of Irish and international film festivals. She is the niece of choreographer and dancer Michael Keegan-Dolan.

== Career ==
After graduating from university, Dolan worked on commercials as well as making short films and music videos. She wrote and directed the drama short film Little Doll, which premiered at Berlinale in 2016. She then wrote and directed the horror short film Catcalls, which premiered at the Cork International Film Festival in 2017, which she won the Emerging Director Award for best short film in 2018.

In 2021, she made her directorial debut with the psychological horror film You Are Not My Mother, which premiered at the 2021 Toronto International Film Festival Midnight Madness programme. The cast includes Hazel Doupe, Carolyn Bracken and Ingrid Craigie. The film was the runner-up for the TIFF People's Choice Midnight Madness Award. The film also won various awards for Dolan, including the Jury Prize for best film at the 2022 Gérardmer Film Festival.

In 2023, she directed two episodes of the second season of Kin. For this work, Dolan won an IFTA. In 2024, she directed two episodes of the second season of The Tourist.

In 2024, she was brought on to co-write and direct the science fiction thriller film Soulm8te, a spin-off and third installment in the M3GAN franchise. It was produced by James Wan and Jason Blum through their Atomic Monster and Blumhouse Productions banners. It stars Lily Sullivan, David Rysdahl, and Claudia Doumit. Principal photography took place from September to November 2024 in Dublin. It was released straight-to-digital on August 1, 2026 by Universal Pictures.

== Personal life ==
Dolan is openly queer.

== Filmography ==
Short film

| Year | Title | Director | Writer |
|---|---|---|---|
| 2012 | Breathe In | Yes | Yes |
| 2016 | Little Doll | Yes | Yes |
| 2017 | Casual | Yes | No |
| 2017 | Catcalls | Yes | Yes |
| 2017 | Small Shoes | Yes | No |

Feature film

| Year | Title | Director | Writer | Notes |
|---|---|---|---|---|
| 2021 | You Are Not My Mother | Yes | Yes | Directorial debut; Role as Pharmacist |
| 2026 | Soulm8te | Yes | Yes | |

Television

| Year | Title | Notes |
|---|---|---|
| 2023 | Kin | 2 episodes |
| 2024 | The Tourist | 2 episodes |

Music video

| Year | Title | Artist |
|---|---|---|
| 2017 | "Of Heart" | Bitch Falcon |
| 2018 | "Prime Number" | Bitch Falcon |
| 2018 | "Gay Girls" | Pillow Queens |
| 2019 | "Brothers" | Pillow Queens |
| 2020 | "Holy Show" | Pillow Queens |
| 2020 | "Handsome Wife" | Pillow Queens |
| 2022 | "Be by Your Side" | Pillow Queens |
| 2024 | "Heavy Pour" | Pillow Queens |
