= Annilese Miskimmon =

Northern Irish opera director

Annilese Miskimmon (born 1974) is a Northern Irish opera director who has been the artistic director of English National Opera since 2020. She previously held equivalent posts at Ireland's Opera Theatre Company (2004–2012), Danish National Opera (2012–2017) and the Norwegian National Opera and Ballet (2017–2020). She is also a freelance director who has often worked with Glyndebourne Festival Opera, Opera Holland Park and other companies.

Her productions include classics of the repertoire, such as Puccini's Madama Butterfly (2018), as well as rarely performed operas. They are often reset in the twentieth century, with several stagings employing Miskimmon's native Ireland as the setting, including Janáček's Jenufa (2015), Bellini's I Puritani (2015) and Puccini's Suor Angelica (2024).

== Early life and education ==
Annilese Miskimmon was born in 1974 in Bangor, County Down, near Belfast, to Irene and John Miskimmon. She was educated at Glenlola Collegiate School in Bangor. She said in a 2016 interview with Fiona Maddocks that opera – simply a "really dramatic story with big music" – was "central" to her imagination as a child, adding that opera, together with theatre, formed a "safe place for open-minded, creative people from both communities" during the Northern Ireland conflict. Miskimmon cites her father, who sang in amateur productions with Opera Northern Ireland and Castleward Opera, as an important influence. The first opera that she attended was an amateur performance of The Magic Flute in Belfast, at the age of ten. She sang in the chorus of amateur opera productions in her teens, and appeared, aged fifteen, as the Page in Verdi's Rigoletto with Opera Northern Ireland, at Belfast's Grand Opera House.

Miskimmon read English at Christ's College, Cambridge (1992–1995). There she was involved with the college's amateur dramatic society and the university's opera and Gilbert and Sullivan societies. She became president of the college JCR, where she led a campaign to protect first-year students from older ones. She then went to City University in London, where she studied arts management (1995–1996). While a student she started to direct theatre and opera, including Cambridge productions of Johann Christian Bach's Endimione and in 1996, Arianna, an early performance of Alexander Goehr's response to a lost work by Monteverdi, which received reviews in the national press.

== Career and productions ==
=== Early career and Opera Theatre Company (to 2012) ===
Miskimmon was an in-house producer at Welsh National Opera (1996–2001) and consultant associate director at Glyndebourne Festival Opera (2001–2003). During this time she served as an assistant under the opera directors David Alden, Richard Jones, Graham Vick and Deborah Warner. An early work she directed was a 2000 semi-staged performance of Leonard Bernstein's musical On the Town at the Royal Festival Hall in London. In 2002, she directed a production of Tchaikovsky's The Queen of Spades (originally a Welsh National Opera production, directed by Jones) with the Canadian Opera Company.

At the beginning of 2004, Miskimmon became artistic director at Ireland's Opera Theatre Company (2004–2012), a national Dublin-based touring company founded in 1986 that specialised in small diverse productions in a large number of venues across Ireland. One of her first productions with the company was the European premiere of Daron Hagen's Vera of Las Vegas, which she directed with "pace and wit", according to Robert Thicknesse, writing in The Times. Chris Moffat comments in Fortnight in 2006 on the "originality and panache" of her reworkings of traditional operas with the company, particularly praising her "racy" version of Monteverdi's The Coronation of Poppea (2004) featuring "cupids on skateboards" as an "ironic" commentary on the opera's original audience.

In 2006, she directed Mozart's Apollo and Hyacinthus, in a collaboration with the London-based Classical Opera Company; Mozart wrote the opera when he was eleven, and Miskimmon includes the child composer as a character. The same year she directed a popular production of Beethoven's Fidelio in Dublin's Kilmainham Gaol, later described by Eileen Battersby in the Irish Times as among the company's "most magnificent productions". The following year, Miskimmon reset Handel's Orlando in a hospital, using giant poppies in the central act. In 2010, Opera Theatre Company was threatened with withdrawal of its Art Council funding. That year, Miskimmon co-directed, with Ingrid Craigie, the Irish premiere of Grigory Frid's The Diary of Anne Frank, in what was announced as the company's final production. Closure was averted, and Miskimmon's last production with the company came the following year: Mozart's The Magic Flute, re-imagined in early 20th-century London, with a minimal set designed by Nicky Shaw.

=== Danish National Opera and Norwegian National Opera and Ballet (2012–2020) ===
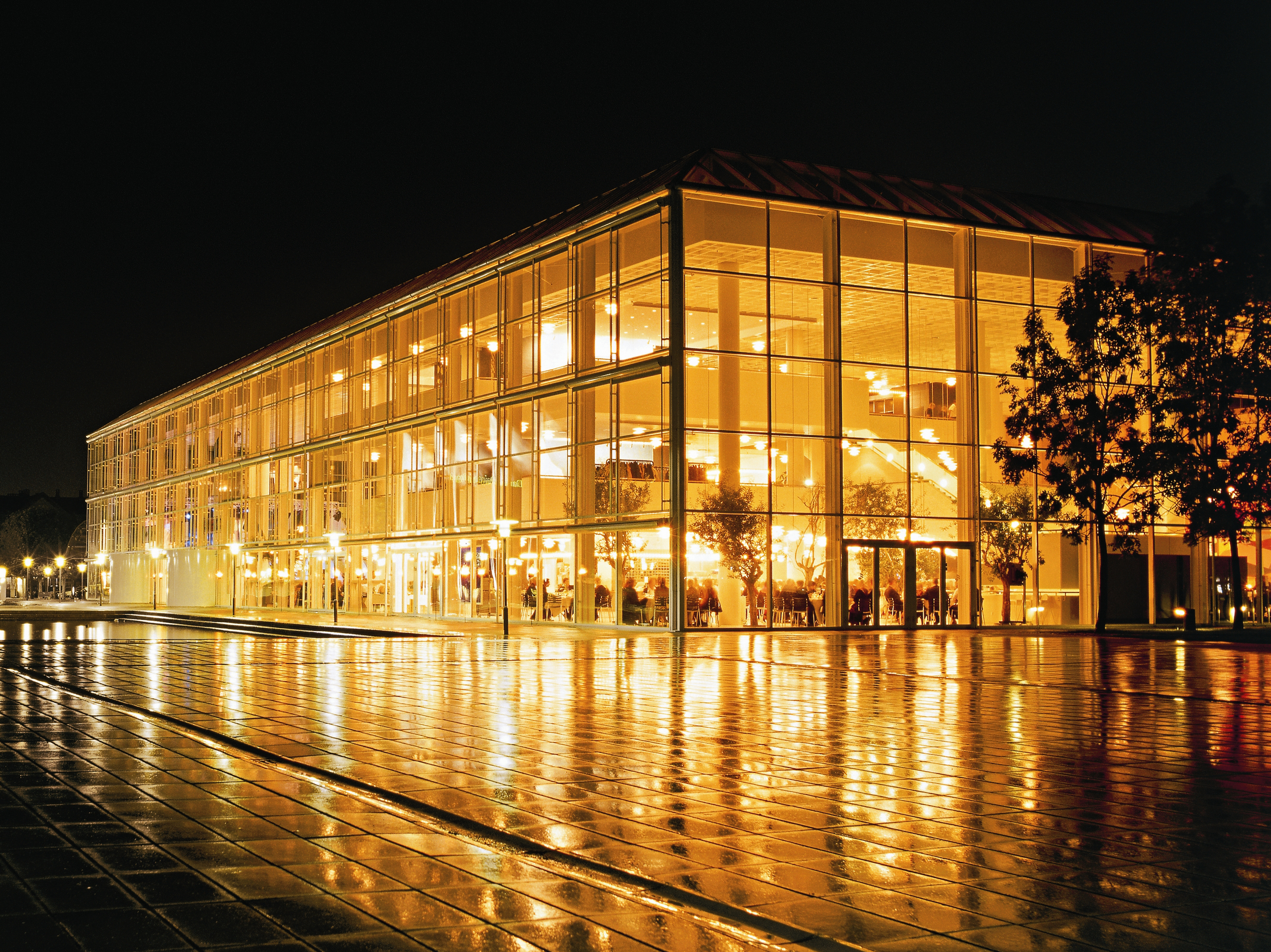
Musikhuset Aarhus, base of the Danish National Opera, where Miskimmon was artistic director (2012–2017)

From September 2012 to 2017, Miskimmon was the general manager and artistic director of the Danish National Opera (Den Jyske Opera), the country's largest touring company, which is based in Aarhus. Her first production with the company, in 2013, was Denmark's premiere of Janáček's Káťa Kabanová. The following year, she staged the rarely performed Massenet's Don Quichotte. In 2015, she staged an experimental version of Mozart's Così fan tutte, in which the audience selected both the type of staging and the interpretation of the ending. Hannah Nepil, writing in the Financial Times, considers that this "milks the ambiguity" of the ending, and underlines the work's focus on "choice, indecision and 'the road not taken'". The opera writer Andrew Mellor (quoted in the New York Times) said that she created "several innovative productions" in Denmark, which "became talking points"; in addition to Così fan tutte, he highlighted her commission Brothers, which addresses post-traumatic stress in Afghanistan veterans.

In August 2017 Miskimmon became the director of opera at the Norwegian National Opera and Ballet (2017–2020), based in Oslo. The Norwegian newspaper Aftenposten's opera reviewer, Maren Ørstavik (quoted in the New York Times), praised Miskimmon during her tenure there for making good artistic choices, as well as for having a gift for understanding what will please an audience. Although according to Mellor, Miskimmon experienced conflict in the post over her use of guest artists, Ørstavik judged that she had been a "diplomatic leader" at the company. A major production at the company was the Norwegian premiere of Britten's Billy Budd, which was positively reviewed by Ørstavik in Aftenposten. The production was reset on a submarine during the Second World War, using an extravagant set based on a larger-than-lifesized submarine, which Shirley Apthorp, in a review for the Financial Times, writes adds nothing except "anachronistic dissonance"; she considers that Miskimmon failed to uncover the necessary "fizzing current of homoerotic tension" between the characters, rendering the drama "apathetically told and ultimately pointless".

=== Freelance opera director (2004–2020) ===
Throughout this period, Miskimmon worked concurrently as a freelance director. In 2004, she revived Jones' version of Humperdinck's Hansel and Gretel with the Welsh National Opera, as well as Vick's production of Debussy's Pelléas et Mélisande with Glyndebourne. The same year she directed Handel's Semele with the British Youth Opera at the Queen Elizabeth Hall in London; Thicknesse, in a review for the Times, commends some of Miskimmon's directorial ideas but feels that the production was "undone by overambition". In 2007, she directed a production of Mozart's early work, Il re pastore, at Garsington Opera, which Geoff Brown, in a review for the Times, writes "teases enough to twinkle, but never to irk". The same summer she directed Offenbach's Bluebeard at Buxton Opera House, employing "immaculate comic timing", according to Hilary Finch in the Times. Later that year she directed the premiere of Julian Grant's children's opera, Shadowtracks, at the Royal College of Music in London. In 2009, she directed Handel's Orlando at Buxton, in a production set in a hospital ward, which, according to Finch, at times approached Doctor in the House but "comes into its own" with a shower of giant poppy petals that accompanied the central character's madness.

In 2012, she directed Verdi's Falstaff at Opera Holland Park, in a production which Brown, in a review for the Times, criticises for a lack of humour and a confusing setting "mostly" in the 1920s that "mix[es] and match[es] references". Richard Fairman, in a more-balanced review for the Financial Times, describes the production as "hyperactive", with the comedy having a "cruel, rather manic feel". The same year, she directed Verdi's La Traviata in a pared-down, English-language touring production with Scottish Opera, later described in The Herald as "stylish" and "hard-hitting". She updated the setting to Paris in the 1950s; Miskimmon says that she chose a timeframe when the aristocracy remained influential but the class system was "destroying itself from inside".

In 2014, she directed Britten's The Turn of the Screw with Opera Holland Park, in a production that the American critic Wendy Lesser describes as an "artistic miracle" in which "[t]he unnatural, the unlikely, was clearly the rule of the day", also praising the spare classroom setting that facilitated the movement of the ghosts. That year she also directed a tour of Handel's Acis and Galatea with Mid Wales Opera and the Royal Welsh College of Music & Drama.

The following year, in a production with Scottish Opera, she re-imagined the 19th-century rural Czech setting of Janáček's Jenufa as 1918 Ireland; Miskimmon said in an interview that her intent was to make the audience focus on the universality of the opera's themes, particularly the "complexity of being human" and people's "mixture of cruelty and kindness", rather than be distanced by the unfamiliar setting. Fiona Maddocks, in a review for The Observer, writes that the change gave a "different and unexpected" perspective, and praises the production's "impact and intelligence". Later that year, Miskimmon staged Bellini's I Puritani with the Welsh National Opera, re-envisaging the Roundheads of the original as Orangemen in 1970s Belfast, a conceit that Maddocks in the Observer and Rian Evans in the Guardian each praise, but Michael Tanner, in a more-balanced review for The Spectator, criticises. The heroine's hallucinations or psychosis are used to enable reversion to the Civil War setting, in a device that Maddocks praises but Evans considers verges on overcomplexity. Miskimmon also "[m]ore controversially" overturns the opera's ending, a move which Evans describes as "less illogical" than the original.

In 2018, Miskimmon's version of Puccini's Madama Butterfly at Glyndebourne unusually shifted the setting to American-occupied Japan in the 1950s; Rupert Christiansen, in a review for the Telegraph, comments that the choice lends "urgency" to Butterfly's plight, likening her to a "war bride". Christiansen, also in the Telegraph, criticises her earlier decision to give Handel's Semele a modern setting, in a 2017 production with Garsington Opera, writing that Miskimmon here "flounders" as a director and "blurs" the opera's "sly sexual politics", describing the staging as "littered with rather desperate visual ideas".

As well as giving a new slant to classics of the repertoire, Miskimmon successfully staged underperformed works. For example, in 2011, she directed Mascagni's L'Amico Fritz with Opera Holland Park, changing the setting from 19th-century France to 1950s America, a move that Christiansen, reviewing for the Telegraph, describes as "effortless, enlivening – and nicely cute"; Neil Fisher, reviewing in the Times, writes that the resetting "adds spice if not quite enough sense", describing the production overall as a "fruity delight for fans of verismo". Her production that year of Ambroise Thomas's Mignon at Buxton Festival is described by Andrew Clark in the Financial Times as embracing the period sensibility of the piece, "preserving the innocence of the story and sprinkling it with fairy-dust".

=== English National Opera (2020–present) ===
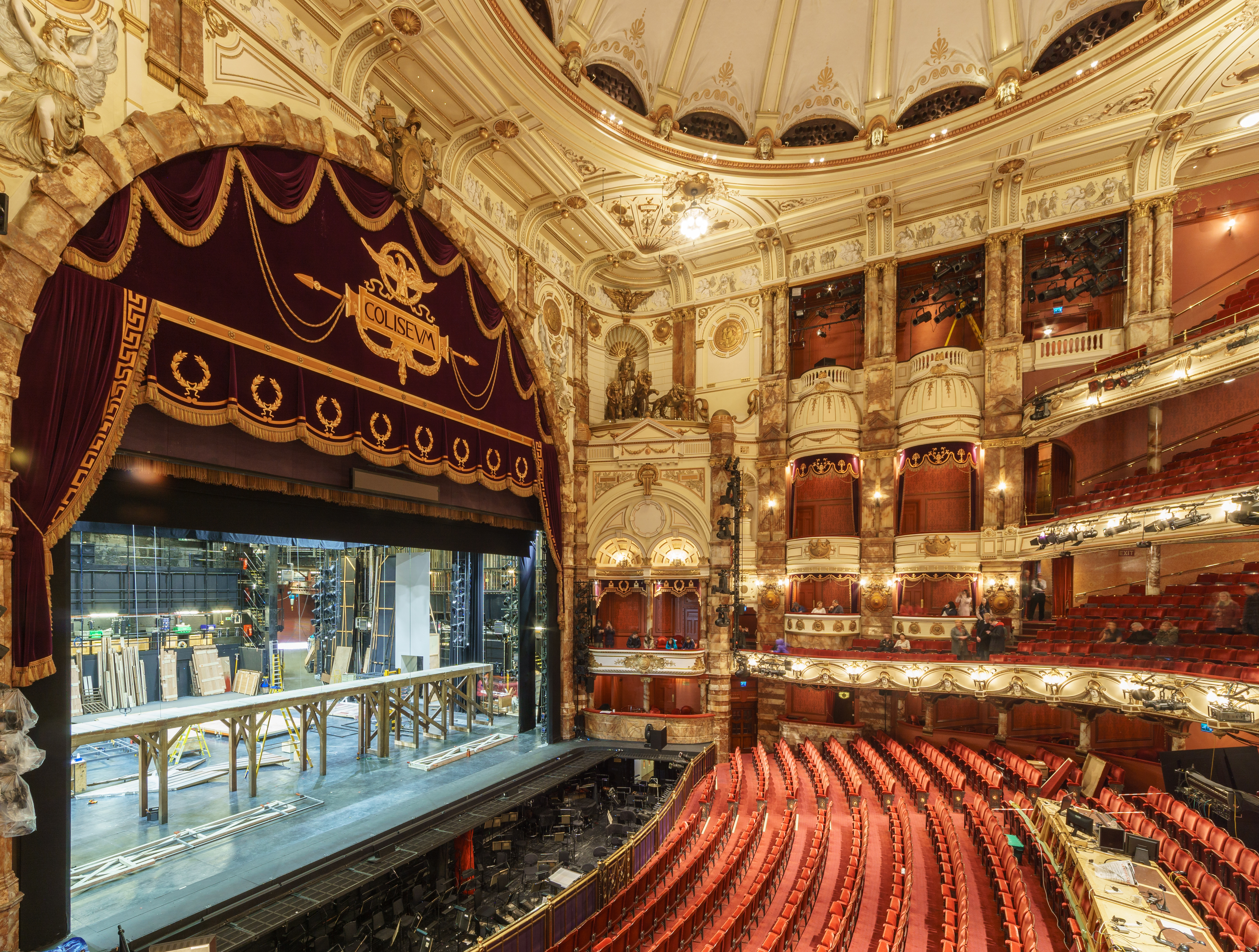
Interior of the London Coliseum, base of the English National Opera, where Miskimmon is artistic director (from 2020)

In October 2019, Miskimmon was appointed artistic director of the English National Opera (ENO), succeeding Daniel Kramer; at the time Gramophone described her as the only woman to lead an important opera company in Britain. She took up the post in May 2020 during coronavirus lockdown, and in September 2020, led innovative Drive and Live ENO performances of Puccini's La Bohème in the car park of Alexandra Palace, London, in England's first drive-in opera performance.

The choice of Poul Ruders' The Handmaid's Tale for her first conventional production at ENO in April 2022 is described by Nicholas Kenyon in the Telegraph as a "brave move... vindicated" by a "totally committed and communicative" performance that attracted a younger-than-usual audience. The production employed a simple staging that coupled austere sets with film denoting the character's memories, a contrast which Fairman, in a review for the Financial Times, found effective while Kenyon describes the set as "dreary".

In 2023, she directed the second UK staging of Korngold's Die Tote Stadt, which Miskimmon says "explores how grief meets religion meets the subconscious", adding that "infatuation can be both very negative and an incredibly creative act", in an English-language production. In a September 2024 production of Puccini's Suor Angelica that was among the Telegraph's top five operas of the year, Miskimmon moved the setting from Italy to Ireland's Magdalene Laundries.

She was elected an honorary fellow of Christ's College in 2023.

== Personal life ==
Miskimmon is married. As of 2021, she lived in Surrey.

== List of productions ==
Partial chronological list of professional opera and musical productions directed by Miskimmon.

Year	Opera (composer)	Company/festival	Notes	Refs
1999	Pelléas et Mélisande (Debussy)	Glyndebourne	Also 2004	
2000	On the Town (Bernstein)	BBC Concert Orchestra	Semi-staged at Royal Festival Hall	
2000	Così fan tutte (Mozart)	Glyndebourne		
2001	Fidelio (Beethoven)	Glyndebourne		
2002	The Queen of Spades (Tchaikovsky)	Canadian Opera Company	Revival of production by Richard Jones	
2003	Lulu (Berg)	Oper Frankfurt	Also 2004	
2003	La Cenerentola (Rossini)	Opera Theatre Company		
2004	Vera of Las Vegas (Hagen)	Opera Theatre Company		
2004	La Bohème (Puccini)	English Touring Opera		
2004	Hansel and Gretel (Humperdinck)	Welsh National Opera	Revival of production by Richard Jones	
2004	Semele (Handel)	British Youth Opera		
2005	L'incoronazione di Poppea (Monteverdi)	Opera Theatre Company	Also 2006	
2005	L'elisir d'amore (Donizetti)	Opera Holland Park		
2005	The Queen of Spades (Tchaikovsky)	San Francisco Opera		
2005	La Bohème (Puccini)	Opera Theatre Company		
2006	Fidelio (Beethoven)	Opera Theatre Company		
2006	Apollo et Hyacinthus (Mozart)	Classical Opera Company/Opera Theatre Company		
2006	Così fan tutte (Mozart)	Opera Theatre Company		
2007	Orlando (Handel)	Opera Theatre Company		
2007	Barbe-bleue (Offenbach)	Buxton Festival		
2007	Il re pastore (Mozart)	Garsington Opera		
2007	Shadowtracks (Grant)	Royal College of Music	Premiere	
2008	Pelléas et Mélisande (Debussy)	Opera Theatre Company		
2008	Iolanta (Tchaikovsky)	Opera Holland Park		
2008	Bastien und Bastienne (Mozart)	Opera Theatre Company	Also 2011	
2009	Alcina (Handel)	Opera Theatre Company	Also 2010	
2009	Acis and Galatea (Handel)	Opera Theatre Company		
2010	The Diary of Anne Frank (Frid)	Opera Theatre Company		
2010	The Marriage of Figaro (Mozart)	Opera Theatre Company		
2010	Roméo et Juliette (Gounod)	Opera Ireland		
2010	Der Freischütz (von Weber)	Salzburger Landestheater		
2011	Mignon (Thomas)	Buxton Festival		
2011	L'amico Fritz (Mascagni)	Opera Holland Park		
2011	Don Pasquale (Donizetti)	Opera Theatre Company		
2011–12	The Magic Flute (Mozart)	Opera Theatre Company		
2012	Falstaff (Verdi)	Opera Holland Park		
2013	Kát'a Kabanová (Janáček)	Danish National Opera		
2013	La Traviata (Verdi)	Scottish Opera		
2014	Don Quichotte (Massenet)	Danish National Opera		
2014	The Turn of the Screw (Britten)	Opera Holland Park		
2014	Acis and Galatea (Handel)	Mid Wales Opera		
2015	I puritani (Bellini)	Welsh National Opera		
2015	Così fan tutte (Mozart)	Danish National Opera		
2015	Jenůfa (Janáček)	Scottish Opera		
2015	Jenůfa (Janáček)	Danish National Opera		
2016	Madama Butterfly (Puccini)	Glyndebourne	Also 2018, 2020	
2016	I puritani (Bellini)	Danish National Opera		
2017	Jenůfa (Janáček)	Royal Swedish Opera		
2017	Semele (Handel)	Garsington Opera		
2018	I puritani (Bellini)	Gran Teatre del Liceu		
2019	Billy Budd (Britten)	Norwegian National Opera and Ballet		
2019	Billy Budd (Britten)	Teatr Wielki (Opera Narodowa)		
2022	The Handmaid's Tale (Ruders)	English National Opera	Also 2024	
2023	The Turn of the Screw (Britten)	Folkoperan		
2023	Die Tote Stadt (Korngold)	English National Opera		
2024	Jenůfa (Janáček)	Royal Swedish Opera		
2024	Suor Angelica (Puccini)	English National Opera		
