= List of Irish revolutionary period films =

Below is an incomplete list of feature films, television films or television series which include events of the Irish revolutionary period. This list does not include documentaries, short films.

== Films ==
Year	Country	Main title (Alternative title)	Director	Subject
1916	United States	Whom the Gods Destroy	J. Stuart Blackton; Herbert Brenon; William P.S. Earle	Drama, war. Easter rising
1926	Ireland	Irish Destiny	George Dewhurst	Drama, romance. Irish war of independence
1929	United Kingdom	The Informer	Arthur Robison	Drama. Based on the novel "The informer".
1930	United Kingdom	Juno and the Paycock	Alfred Hitchcock	Comedy, drama. Based on the play "Juno and the Paycock". Irish civil war
1934	United States	The Key	Michael Curtiz	Drama. Irish war of independence
1935	Ireland	Guests of the Nation	Denis Johnston	Drama. Based on the short story "Guests of the Nation". Irish war of independence
1935	United States	The Informer	John Ford	Crime, drama. Based on the novel "The informer".
1936	United Kingdom	Ourselves Alone	Brian Desmond Hurst	Drama, romance, war. Irish war of independence
1936	Ireland	The Dawn	Tom Cooper	Drama, history. Irish war of independence
1936	United States	Beloved Enemy	H.C. Potter	Drama, romance, war. Michael Collins, Irish war of independence
1937	United Kingdom	The High Command	Thorold Dickinson	Crime, drama, war. Based on the novel "The general goes too far". Irish war of independence
1937	United States	The Plough and the Stars	John Ford	Drama. Based on the play "The plough and the stars". Easter rising
1941	Nazi Germany	My Life for Ireland (Mein Leben für Irland)	Max W. Kimmich	Drama. Irish war of independence
1957	Ireland	The Rising of the Moon	John Ford	Comedy, drama. Based on the play "The rising of the moon". Irish war of independence
1959	Ireland; United States	Shake Hands with the Devil	Michael Anderson	Action, drama, history. Based on the novel "Shake hands with the Devil". Irish war of independence
1959	Ireland	This Other Eden	Muriel Box	Drama, comedy. Based on the play "This other Eden". Irish war of independence
1970	United Kingdom; United States	Ryan's Daughter	David Lean	Drama, romance. Based on the novel "Madame Bovary".
1971	France; Italy	One Is Always Too Good to Women (On est toujours trop bon avec les femmes)	Michel Boisrond	Comedy, drama. Easter rising
1983	Ireland	Attracta	Kieran Hickey	Drama. Based on the short story "Attracta".
1983	United Kingdom	Ascendancy	Edward Bennett	Drama.
1988	United Kingdom	The Dawning	Robert Knights	Drama, romance, thriller. Based on the novel "The old jest". Irish war of independence
1990	United Kingdom	Fools of Fortune	Pat O'Connor	Drama, romance. Based on the novel "Fools of fortune". Irish war of independence
1996	United States; Ireland	Michael Collins	Neil Jordan	Biography, drama, thriller, war. Michael Collins
1999	France; United Kingdom; Ireland	The Last September	Deborah Warner	Drama, history, romance. Based on the novel "The last September". Irish War of Independence
2006	Ireland; United Kingdom; Germany; Italy; Spain; France; Switzerland	The Wind That Shakes the Barley	Ken Loach	Drama, war. Irish war of independence, Irish civil war.
2014	Ireland	A Nightingale Falling	Garret Daly; Martina McGlynn	Drama, history, war. Based on the novel "A nightingale falling". Irish war of independence
2016	Ireland	Fingal’s Finest	Colin D. Farrell	Thomas Ashe, Easter rising.
2018	Ireland; United Kingdom	Penance (Aithrí)	Tommy Collins	Action, romance. Based on the story "Seacht mBua an Éirí Amach". Easter rising
2022	Ireland; United Kingdom; United States	The Banshees of Inisherin	Martin McDonagh	Comedy, drama. Irish civil war

== Television films ==
Year	Country	Main title (Alternative title)	Director	Subject
1938	United Kingdom	Juno and the Paycock		Drama. Based on the play "Juno and the Paycock". Irish civil war
1958	United States	Little Moon of Alban	George Schaefer	Drama. Irish war of independence
1960	United States	Juno and the Paycock	Paul Shyre	Drama. Based on the play "Juno and the Paycock". Irish civil war
1964	United States	Little Moon of Alban	George Schaefer	Irish war of independence
1972	Norway	Skuggen av ein helt	Jon Heggedal	Based on the play "The shadow of a gunman". Irish war of independence
1972	United States	The Shadow of a Gunman	Joseph Hardy	Drama. Based on the play "The shadow of a gunman". Irish war of independence
1974	Sweden	Skuggan av en hjälte	Göran Graffman	Based on the play "Juno and the Paycock". Irish civil war
1980	Ireland; United Kingdom	Juno and the Paycock	Roger Cheveley	Drama. Based on the play "Juno and the Paycock". Irish civil war
1981	United States	Guests of the Nation	John J. Desmond	Drama, war. Based on the short story "Guests of the Nation". Irish war of independence
1987	United Kingdom	The Rockingham Shoot	Kieran Hickey	Drama.
1991	Ireland	The Treaty	Jonathan Lewis	Drama, History. Anglo-Irish treaty
1997	Ireland	Ballyseedy	Frank Hand	History. Ballyseedy massacre
2016	Ireland	Eoin MacNeill: The Forgotten Man of 1916	Damian McCann	Drama. Eoin MacNeill

== Television series ==
Year	Country	Main title (Alternative title)	Director	Subject
1975	United Kingdom	Days of Hope	Jim Allen	Drama, History, War.
1988	United Kingdom	Troubles	Christopher Morahan	Drama. Based on the novel "Troubles". Irish war of independence
2001	United Kingdom	Rebel Heart	John Strickland	Drama.
2016	Ireland	Wrecking the Rising (Éirí Amach Amú)	Ruán Magan	Comedy. Easter rising
2016	Ireland	Trial of the Century	Maurice Sweeney	Drama. Patrick Pearse
2016	Ireland	Rebellion	Aku Louhimies	Drama, history, war. Easter rising
2019	Ireland	Resistance	Catherine Morshead	Drama. Bloody Sunday
