= Encompass New Opera Theatre =

Encompass New Opera Theatre is a professional opera company located in New York City which specializes in premiering new productions, and reviving 20th century operas by American and international composers. A member of Opera America, Encompass was founded in 1975 by Nancy Rhodes who remains the company's Artistic Director. Since its founding, Encompass has produced over 50 fully mounted operas with orchestra as well as staged readings of more than 150 new works.

The company's first production was Virgil Thomson's 1947 opera, The Mother of Us All. Other past productions have included:

- World premiere of Ricky Ian Gordon's Only Heaven, set to poems by Langston Hughes. (1995, reprised 2001)
- New York premiere of Grigory Frid's 1969 opera, The Diary of Anne Frank, set to excerpts from Anne Frank's diary (2002)
- Hans Werner Henze's End of a World (an early work originally written as a radio opera) and John Harbison's A Full Moon in March, a setting of the play by William Butler Yeats (2003)
- World premiere of Gertrude Stein Invents a Jump Early On, an opera of based on the life of Gertrude Stein composed by William C. Banfield to a libretto by the poet Karren LaLonde Alenier (performed with two other operas based on texts by Stein, Virgil Thomson's 1927 Capital Capitals and Ned Rorem's 1968 Three Sisters Who Are Not Sisters, 2005)
- New York premiere of Philip Hagemann's Shaw Sings!, two one-act operas based on the writings of George Bernard Shaw (2008)

In 2009 the company received an "Access to Artistic Excellence" from The National Endowment for the Arts to fund the world premiere production of The Theory of Everything by composer John David Earnest and librettist, Nancy Rhodes. Excerpts from the work in progress were presented at New York City Opera's VOX 2007 Festival.

Encompass has had three music directors in its history, Jack Gaughan (1975-1993), John Yaffé (1993-2008), and Mara Waldman (2008-present).
