= Kate Thompson =

Kate Thompson may refer to:

- Kate Fanny Thompson, married name of English composer Kate Loder
- Kate Thompson (author) (born 1956), who writes for children and adults, author of The New Policeman and Down among the Gods
- Kate Thompson (romantic novelist) (born 1959), author of It Means Mischief and Sex, Lies and Fairytales
