= Operabase =

Online database focused on opera

- Founded: 1996; 30 years ago
- Headquarters: Copenhagen, Denmark
- Founder: Mike Gibb
- Key people: Ulrike Köstinger (CEO)
- Parent: Arts Consolidated
- Website: https://www.operabase.com

Operabase is an online global database for audiences and professionals. It lists details on opera performances, opera houses and companies, and performers as well as their agents. It was founded in 1996 by English software engineer and opera lover Mike Gibb. Initially a hobby site, it became his full-time occupation after three years. Opera magazine describes the Operabase website as "the most comprehensive source of data on operatic activity". Gibb sold Operabase to Truelinked in 2018. The company was then bought by Arts Consolidated (headquartered in Denmark) and relaunched in 2021. In September 2026, Arts Consolidated ApS's Operabase was acquired by Events.com, a US-based events-technology company, though it continues to be operated from Copenhagen. The management team is led by Bharani Vasudev Setlur (Chief Executive Officer), who succeeded Ulrike Köstinger in September 2026; other members of the management team include Peter Palludan (Chief Technology Officer).

== History ==
=== Early expansion ===
By its tenth anniversary, in 2006, the site received "about 10,000 visitors a day to the public site, who look at over four million pages a month between them. Of these, fewer than half use English, 17% use German, 12% Italian, 10% French, 9% Spanish." In autumn of that year the British magazine Opera Now reported that "Operabase has taken on the Herculean task of making [the site] available to every European Union citizen in their own language – not only the 21 (as at January 2007) official languages of the EU, but Catalan, Icelandic and Norwegian as well." As of November 2012, the free public area of the site is available in 22 languages, and includes 37,000 performances, 40,000 artists, 700 opera companies, festivals and theatres, and the contact details and rosters of 400 artist managers.

Seven years after the public site was launched, a professional site followed and within three years, "200 opera houses from the Met to La Scala" were subscribers. The initial service offering for the 750 euro annual subscription fee had increased artist information and an opera casting tool. The casting tool was used for researching singers for a given role, but was particularly valued for finding replacement singers when there were emergency cancellations. The tool could not only put forward the names of all of the singers who had sung that role, but the artist schedules could be used to find if they were available, and the artists management and contact information could be used to make contact.

=== Recent developments ===
In 2019, Arts Consolidated ApS, a Danish company specialising in performing arts, acquired Operabase. The relaunch of Operabase meant constructing a site as a Service-Orientated Architecture (SOA) that "provides a flexible interface that responds to the needs of individual users."

On 8 September 2026, Events.com, a Californian events-technology company, announced it had completed the acquisition of Operabase from Arts Consolidated ApS. Operabase continues to operate from Copenhagen under Arts Consolidated ApS as part of Events.com's group of live-events brands, which also include Summit, Remo and the La Jolla Concours d'Elegance. Events.com board member Doug R. Harrison led the acquisition and oversees the platform's integration into the group.

Arts Consolidated ApS launched a companion streaming service, CueTV, in 2021, offering opera, classical music and ballet productions. In December 2024, Operabase and Deutsche Grammophon's STAGE+ classical-music streaming service announced a partnership making STAGE+ Operabase's exclusive streaming partner; CueTV ceased operations on 12 December 2024, with its subscribers and Operabase Pro subscribers transitioning to STAGE+.

== Public website ==
The database was operated by Gibb and Muriel Denzler. As has been noted by Gibb and Denzler in an article on the website of Opera Europa (the European opera service organisation similar to those which exist in the US and Canada, Opera America and Opera.ca) they provide specialised services to opera professionals, with the site including "casting tools, artist records, management details, productions information". But they emphasise that "the site was originally created for the general public, who still provide 96% of its users".

Operabase is now available in 34 languages and provides services to opera professionals for a fee, although the site is searchable by any web user at no charge.

== Professional website ==
The professional services are available to companies, festivals, opera houses, theatres, orchestras, choruses, agencies, artists, academia and journalists. The site remains searchable by any web users at no charge.

== Statistics ==
In autumn 2010, Operabase produced a set of statistics to mark the 250,000th performance on file. These statistics were presented at the third European Opera Forum, organised by Opera Europa in London in March 2011. In autumn 2013, the statistics were updated to show the 2012/13 season figures.

The Operabase rankings of the most performed operas formed the basis of a set of music questions in an edition of the BBC's University Challenge, broadcast in July 2014. Competitors were asked to identify three operas in the Operabase list from sound clips of Maria Callas.

=== Most played composers ===
In the five seasons 2008/09 to 2012/13, 2415 different works from 1161 different composers were played. The most popular composers were:

1. Giuseppe Verdi, with 2,586 performances of 28 operas
2. Giacomo Puccini, with 1,893 performances of 12 operas
3. Wolfgang Amadeus Mozart
4. Richard Wagner
5. Gioachino Rossini

More than 600 of the composers played in this period were still alive. The most frequently programmed of these were Philip Glass, Hans Werner Henze, and John Adams. Kaija Saariaho was the most played female composer, living or dead.

=== Most popular operas ===
Throughout the 2015/16 season the most popular operas overall were:

1. La traviata (1853, Verdi) with 4190 performances over 869 runs
2. Die Zauberflöte (1791, Mozart) with 3310 performances over 561 runs
3. Carmen (1875, Bizet) with 3280 performances over 691 runs
4. La bohème (1896, Puccini) with 3131 performances over 672 runs
5. Tosca (1900, Puccini) with 2694 performances over 608 runs

The most popular operas by composers from the 20th century (i.e., by composers born after 1900) were The Turn of the Screw by Benjamin Britten and Lady Macbeth of the Mtsensk District (1934, Dmitri Shostakovich). The most popular works by composers alive on 31 July 2012 were the monodrama The Diary of Anne Frank (composed 1968, Grigory Frid), and the opera Dead Man Walking (2000, Jake Heggie).
