= Eva Ben-Zvi =

Israeli soprano

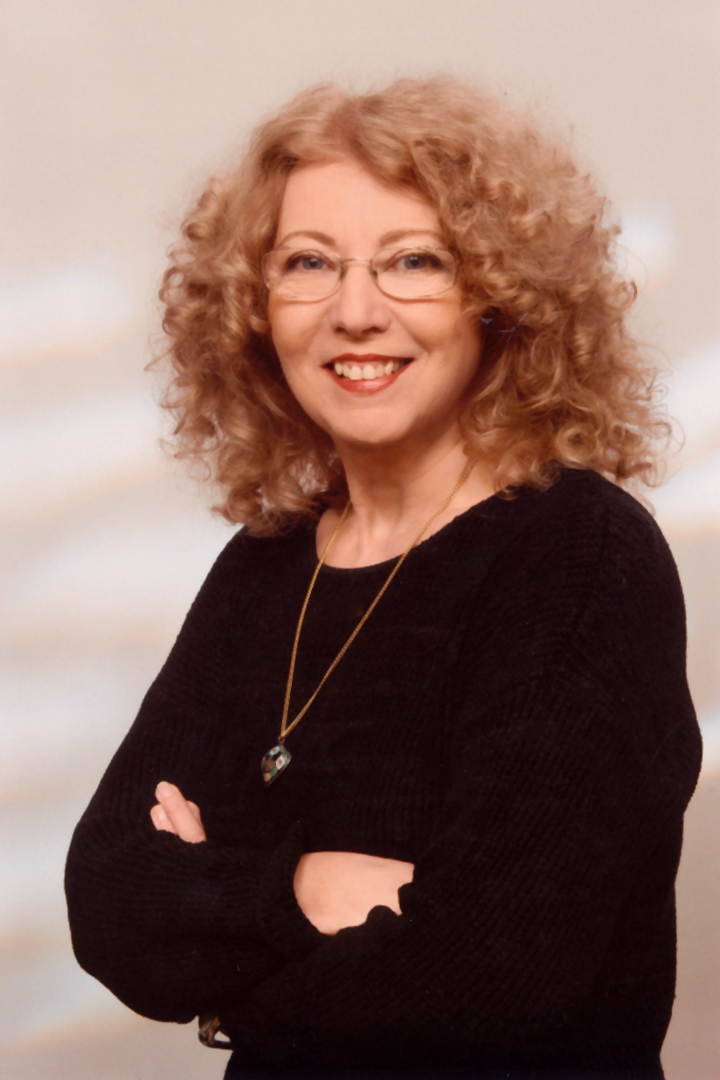

Eva Ben-Zvi (Hebrew: אוה בן צבי; born Chaja Ermanaite, May 7, 1947) is a Lithuanian-born Israeli soprano. She teaches singing at Bar-Ilan University. She has made several notable premiere performances and premiere recordings of Jewish music. She premiered Gabriel Iranyi's song cycle The Hymns of Job in 1993.

Under Russian conductors she made the world premiere recordings of Op79a, the Yiddish version of Shostakovich's songs From Jewish Folk Poetry. and also the solo role of Anne Frank in Grigory Frid's opera The Diary of Anne Frank.

== Discography ==
- "I Will Walk in the Land of the Living" (Ethalech be'artsot hachayim) - Rachel Galinne (2008)
- "Musiques Juives Russes" (From Jewish Folk Poetry) - Shostakovich (2000)
- "Stride Between Verses" – Israeli Art Songs. IMC (Israeli Music Center) (1998)
- "Simeni Kahotam Al Libeha" - Anatolijus Senderovas (1995)
- "The Diary of Anne Frank" - Grigory Frid (1991)

== Family ==
- Husband - Shmuel Ben-Zvi
- Son - Zvi Orleansky
