= Ingrid Craigie =

Irish actress

- Born: Ingrid Craigie; Cork
- Occupation: Actor
- Years active: 1981–present

Ingrid Craigie (born 1953 or 1954) is an Irish theatre, television and film actress.

== Background ==
Craigie was born in County Cork, Ireland to Church of Ireland parents. She grew up in Finglas, Dublin, where her family owned and ran Merville Dairy. Her father, George, served in the Irish Army. Craigie went to school at Alexandra College before studying English at Trinity College Dublin, graduating with a Bachelor of Arts in 1976. Her lecturers included Brendan Kennelly and David Norris. Craigie now lives in Portobello, Dublin.

== Career ==
After university, where she got involved in Trinity Players, Craigie joined the company of the Abbey Theatre where she was offered her first contract by Joe Dowling and where she remained for five years. Her work there included several premieres of Brian Friel plays and she has worked with the major Irish playwrights of the last 50 years, including Tom Murphy and Martin McDonagh. Craigie starred as Grace in the 2006 Gate Theatre production of Friel's Faith Healer alongside Ralph Fiennes. She has also starred in productions of The Beauty Queen of Leenane, Richard III, Measure for Measure, The Man Who Came to Dinner, Mrs. Warren's Profession and Sweet Bird of Youth. On Broadway, she has appeared in The Cripple of Inishmaan with Daniel Radcliffe, Wonderful Tennessee, Ariel by Marina Carr and alongside Brendan Gleeson in The Plough and the Stars. In 2022, Craigie toured Ireland and the United Kingdom as The Proprietor in the Frank McGuiness play Dinner with Groucho. Her filmography includes roles in The Dead in 1987, Da in 1988, Circle of Friends in 1995, Entebbe in 2018, and You Are Not My Mother in 2021.

In 2010, with Annilese Miskimmon, she co-directed the Irish premiere of Grigory Frid's opera, The Diary of Anne Frank, with Opera Theatre Company.

== Awards and achievements ==
In 2006, Craigie was appointed to the board of the Gate Theatre. In 2007, she won The Irish Times Irish Theatre Lifetime Achievement Award.

== Filmography ==
Year	Title	Role	Notes
1986	The Ballroom of Romance	Eenie Mackie	
1987	The Dead	Mary Jane	
1988	Da	Polly	
1992	The Railway Station Man	Mary Heron	
1993	Poor Beast in the Rain	Molly	
1994	Widows' Peak	Mrs. Purdieu	
1994	A Man of No Importance	waitress	
1995	Circle of Friends	Celia Westward	
1996	Messaggi quasi segreti	Audrey Ferguson	
2003	Benedict Arnold: A Question of Honor	Margaret Shippen	
2010	Sensation	Judge	
2010	When Harvey Met Bob	Margaret Thatcher	
2012	Citadel	Dr. Kelly	
2016	The Flag	Audrey	
2018	Entebbe	Renata Werner	
2018	The Delinquent Season	Ms. Hynes	
2019	Forever in my Heart	Molly	
2020	Death of a Ladies' Man	Una	
2021	You Are Not My Mother	Granny Rita	
2024	The Hardacres	Mrs. Dryden	
