= Attracta (film) =

- Directed by: Kieran Hickey
- Produced by: Kieran Hickey; Douglas Kennedy
- Starring: Wendy Hiller; Kate Thompson; Joe McPartland
- Release date: 1983
- Country: Ireland

Attracta is a 1983 Irish drama film directed by Kieran Hickey, co-produced by Douglas Kennedy, and starring Wendy Hiller, Kate Thompson and Joe McPartland. It was based on a short story by William Trevor.

== Plot ==
An elderly schoolteacher reflects on her past.

== Cast ==
- Wendy Hiller as Attracta
- Kate Thompson as the young Attracta
- Joe McPartland as Mr Purce
- John Kavanagh as Mr Devereux
- Kate Flynn as Aunt Emmeline
- Cathleen Delany as Sarah Crookham
- Deirdre Donnelly as Geraldine Carey
- Christopher Casson as Mr Jameson
- Emma McGrane as Attracta at 11 years old
- Aiden Grennell as Archdeacon Flower
- Seamus Forde as Mr Ayrie
- Jane Brennan as Penelope Vade
- Martina Stanley as Maisie
- Alan Stanford as Dr Friendman
