= Fatwah =

Fatwah may mean:

- Fatwa, a legal pronouncement in Islam
- Fatuha, a block in Patna, Bihar state, India
- Fatwa (2006 film), an American drama/thriller film starring Lauren Holly
- Fatwa (2018 film), a Tunisian drama film

== See also ==
- Ifta (disambiguation)
