= Shmuel Ben-Zvi =

Soviet-Israeli journalist

- שְׁמוּאֵל בֵּן צְבִי
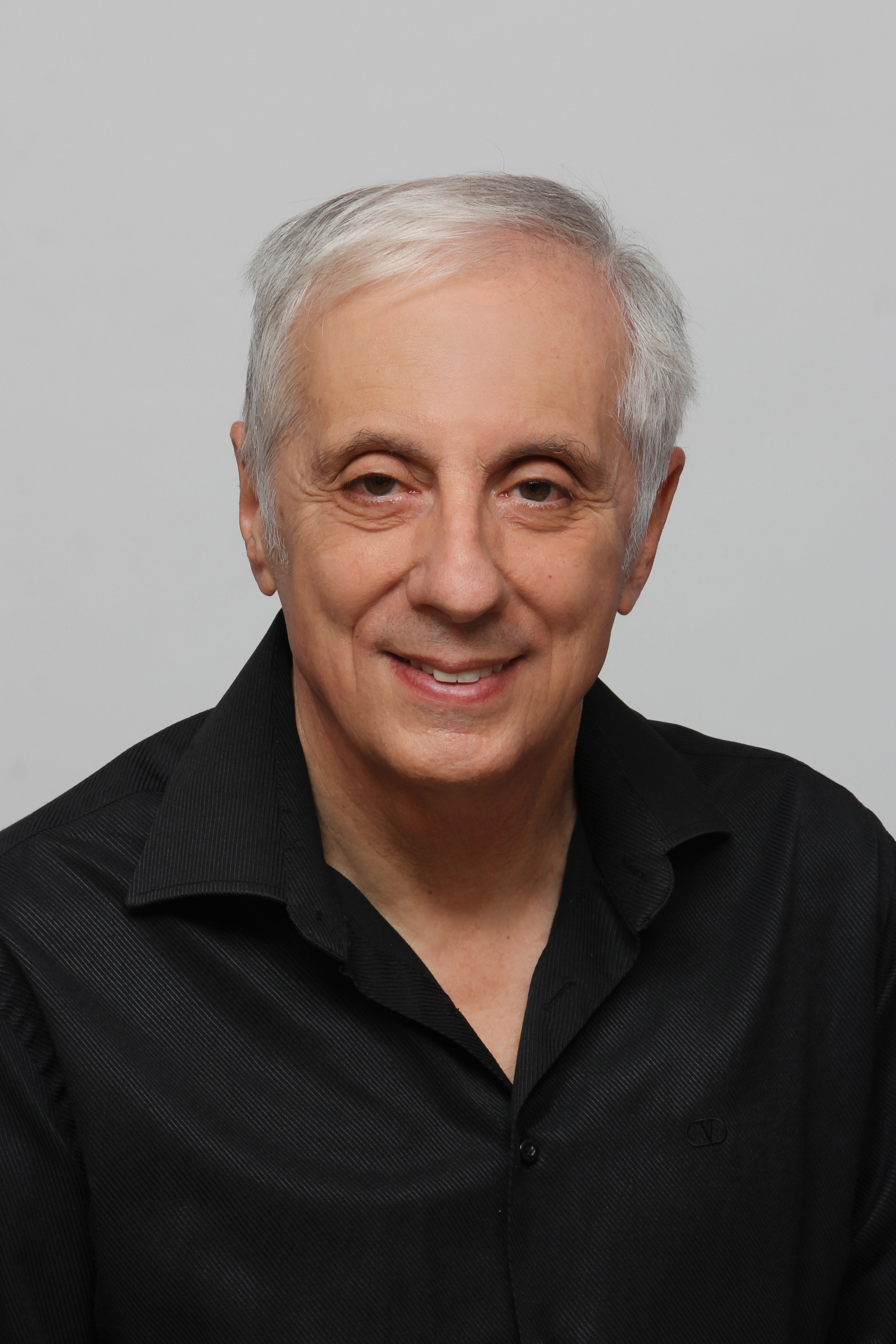

Professional career
- 2011–2015: Editor and news anchor at the state radio station Voice of Israel 1
- 1991–2011: Director of IsraelForeign Broadcasting
- 2000–2003: Editor-in-chief of the TV program "Kaleidoscope" on Israeli First Channel
- 1993–2000: Editor and news anchor on the 1st and 33rd TV channels of the Israel Broadcasting Authority
- 1990–1991: First Director of the branch of the Jewish Agency SOKHNUT in Russia Moscow
- 1989–1990: Director of the branch of the Jewish Agency ("DRY") in Austria, Vienna
- 1986–1989: Administrative Director and Head of the Information Department of the Public Council for Solidarity with Jews in the USSR
- 1984–1986: Adviser to the President of the Bnei B'rith organization and Head of the Arts Lodge
- 1972–1984: Administrative director of the folklore ensemble "Anahnu Kan"

Personal details
- Born: 27 May 1948 (age 78) Vilnius, Lithuania
- Education: Vilnius University

Shmuel Ben-Zvi (Hebrew: שְׁמוּאֵל בֵּן צְבִי; born 27 May 1948) is a Soviet-Israeli journalist. He was Head of International Broadcasting – Voice of Israel – Israel Broadcasting Authority from 1991 to 2011.

== Biography ==
Shmuel Ben-Zvi (birth name: Samuil Zvizon) was born to a Jewish family in Vilnius, Lithuania on 27 May 1948. He studied history at Vilnius University from 1967 to 1971. As a young man, he and his father (Binyamin Zvizon) were actively involved in the activities of the local Jewish folk ensemble which symbolized the fight of Soviet Jews for repatriation to Israel. He eventually left for Israel in 1971. During the period 1972–73, he read Sovietology at the Hebrew University of Jerusalem. He was one of the founders of the Israeli folk ensemble "Anachnu Kan" ("We are here"). For many years, he was its executive director. Under his leadership, the ensemble "Anachnu Kan" has achieved considerable success in many countries. In 1990, the executive board of the Jewish Agency for Israel Sochnut has suggested to Shmuel Ben-Zvi, the prospective managing director of Israel's Radio external services to create the first ever representation mission in Moscow. In November 1990, Shmuel Ben-Zvi became the first official representative of Sochnut in Russia.

The documents were processed at the Dutch embassy in Moscow. Then, as a journalist of Israel's State Radio, he came up with the idea of cooperation with Russian radio and TV. Soon afterwards, in February 1991, a delegation of Israel's Radio executives led by Director General Arie Mekel has arrived in the USSR. They have met with the executive board of Ostankino TV and Radio Company, which succeeded in Russia the Soviet Central Television. These constructive negotiations led to the signing of a cooperation agreement. In the summer of 1991, Michael Karpin, the first ever reporter of Israel's state TV Channel 1, arrived in Moscow. So started the cooperation between Israeli and Russian media. In 1993, Grigory Ratner, who held the post of deputy chief editor of Rostelevidenje Channel 1 ITA (Russian TV) took a business trip to Israel. Together with Shmuel Ben-Zvi, by then the managing director of Israel's Radio external services, they persuaded the Cable TV network in Israel to pay Russian TV for rebroadcasting Channel 1st channel Ostankino programmes. As a result, cable TV network Yes came into being.

== Family ==
He is married to the opera singer, musician and pianist Eva Ben-Zvi.

== Publications ==
- Shmuel Ben-Zvi (January 2020). "Встреча в кафе "Репортер" и ее международные последствия. 17 января Григорию Ратнеру исполнилось бы 73". «ИсраГео» (журнал) (in Russian). "17"

== Literature ==
- Solomonas Atamukas (2018). Lietuvos žydų keliai: atmintis, tikėjimas, viltis. Vilnius: Inter se. p. 195.
