= Glenlola Collegiate School =

- Glenlola Coat of Arms

Location
- Castle Park; Bangor, County Down, BT20 4TH; Northern Ireland
- Coordinates: 54.654°N 5.663°W

Information
- School type: Funded by Government, Grammar school
- Motto: "Nisi dominus frustra" (Without the Lord, all is in vain)
- Founded: ~1880
- School board: SEELB
- Principal: Eric Thompson
- Years offered: 8-14
- Gender: all-girls
- Age range: 11-18
- Enrolment: ~1100
- Average class size: 25
- Classes offered: Key Stage 3, GCSE, A-Level
- Hours in school day: 8:45-3:30
- Classrooms: G8-U38
- Houses: 6: Clanmorris, Dufferin, Hamilton, Harte, Ward and Weir
- Colours: Blue and White
- Athletics: Badminton, cross country, hockey, swimming, netball, tennis
- Rival: The Regiment
- Website: glenlolacollegiate.net

Glenlola Collegiate School is an all-girls' grammar school in Bangor, County Down, Northern Ireland. The school was founded as a school for girls in approximately 1880.

In 2018 the Education and Training Electorate evaluated the school as "Good" in all categories.

The current principal, Mr W. E. Thompson, took up post in February 2010, taking over from Richard Finlay.

== Notable former pupils ==
- Amy Foster, Commonwealth Games Athlete
- Kelly Gallagher, Paralympic Gold medalist
- Inez McCormack, human rights activist and trade union leader
- Annilese Miskimmon, artistic director of the English National Opera
- Zöe Salmon, Blue Peter presenter
