= Ifta (disambiguation) =

Ifta is a municipality in Thuringia, Germany.

Ifta or IFTA may also refer to:

- Ifta (river), a river in Thuringia, Germany
- Independent Film & Television Alliance, a US-based trade association
- Insect Farming and Trading Agency, a government agency of Papua New Guinea
- Institute for Truth in Accounting, United States, advocates transparency in accounting
- International Federation of Teachers' Associations
- International Federation of Technical Analysts (in finance)
- International Fuel Tax Agreement, agreement between Canada and the United States
- Internet Tax Freedom Act, United States law
- Irish Film & Television Academy
  - IFTA Film & Drama Awards, awards given out by the Irish Film & Television Academy
- Ifta (Islam), delivering a legal opinion (fatwa) in Islam

== See also ==
- Fatwah (disambiguation)
