= Den Jyske Opera =

Danish opera company

Den Jyske Opera, also known as the Danish National Opera, is based in Aarhus, Denmark. Established in 1947, it is Denmark's largest touring opera company, and the second only to the Royal Danish Opera in Copenhagen.

== Description ==
Founded in Aarhus in 1947, the company staged two operas a year until 1977. It then collaborated with five provincial orchestras, staging some 100 performances per season. In 1982, Den Jyske Opera became based in Musikhuset Aarhus, producing a number of Richard Wagner's operas which culminated in Der Ring des Nibelungen in 1982 and again in 1996. The company later performed a series of operas by Richard Strauss and, in 2001, several of Giacomo Puccini's works.

Funded by the Danish Ministry of Culture, the company tours throughout Denmark staging both traditional and innovative operas while aiming at the highest artistic quality. With a permanent chorus of 24, it frequently performs with the Aarhus Symphony Orchestra.

Past general managers and artistic directors include Annilese Miskimmon (2012–17).
