= Michael Keegan-Dolan =

Irish dancer and choreographer

- Born: Michael Dolan; 1969 (age 56–57); Dublin
- Education: Central School of Ballet
- Occupations: Dancer, choreographer
- Style: Contemporary dance
- Spouse: Rachel Poirier
- Children: 2
- Relatives: Kate Dolan (niece)
- Website: https://teacdamsa.com/

Michael Keegan-Dolan (born 1969) is an Irish choreographer and dancer. He is the founder of Teaċ Daṁsa and the Fabulous Beast Dance Theatre company.

== Career ==
Keegan-Dolan trained as a dancer at the Central School of Ballet in London. He became an associate artist at Sadler's Wells, the UK's primary contemporary dance theatre.

A limited dancer, he moved into choreography, working on productions at Royal Opera House, the English National Opera, and the National Theatre.

Returning to Longford in Ireland, he founded the Fabulous Beast Dance Theatre in 1997. Among its productions, Giselle, The Bull and The Rite of Spring were nominated for Olivier Awards.

In 2014, he dissolved the company and re-emerged with Teaċ Daṁsa (teach damhsa, Irish for "house of dance", stylised with an overdot used in traditional Irish orthography) in 2016. Based in the Irish-speaking Gaeltacht area of County Kerry in the south-west of the country, its first work was Swan Lake/Loch na hEala, a reimagining of the Tchaikovsky standard that disregards the original score.

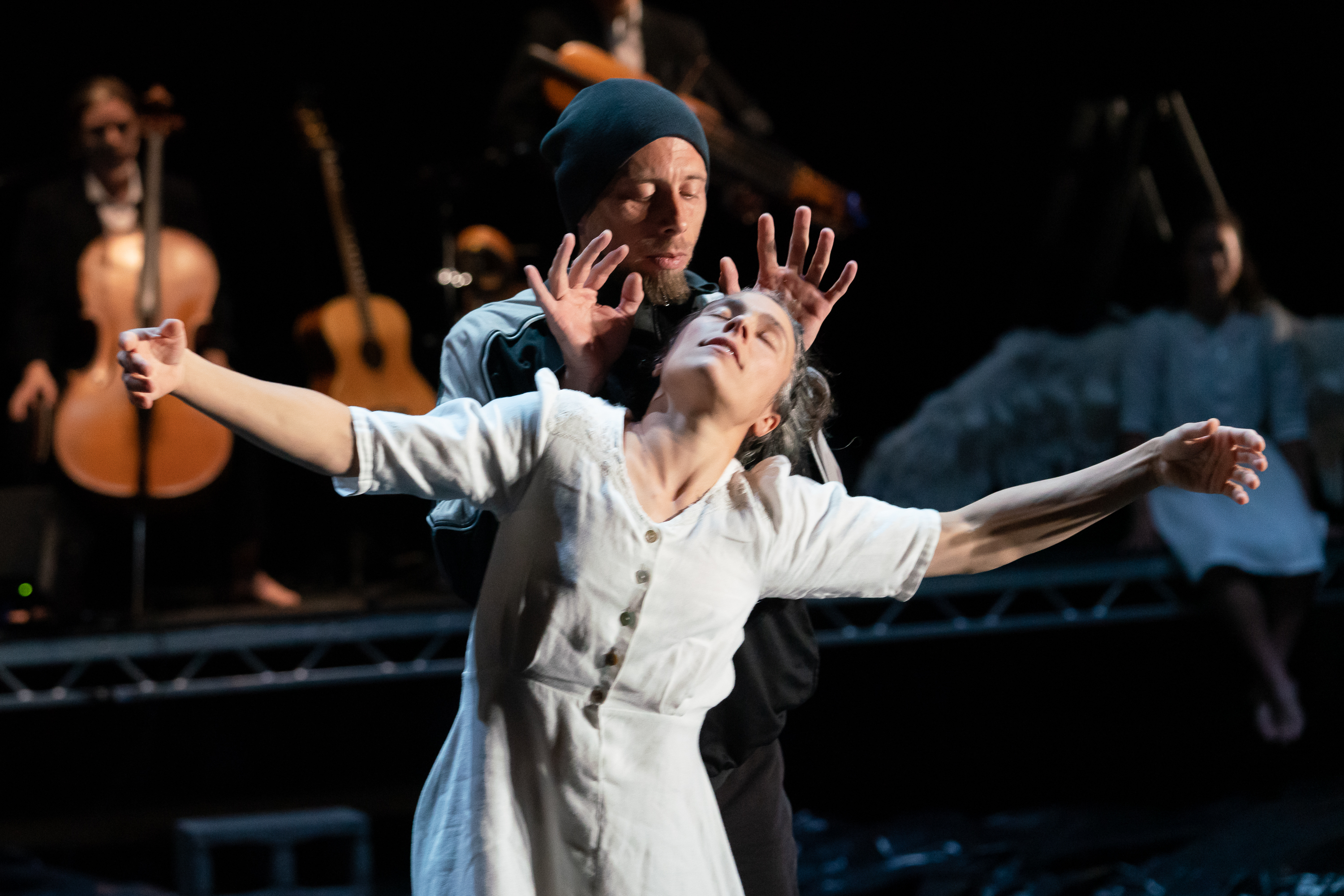
Swan Lake/Loch na hEala at the Brooklyn Academy of Music, New York, in 2019

Mám, with music by west Kerry concertina maestro Cormac Begley and Berlin orchestral collective Stargaze, debuted in Dublin in 2019. Described as a "mysterious, mythic" work, it moves on from previous retellings of classic ballets and tales to build a work responding to the original music, with dancers' individual, stylised solos continually giving way to ensemble pieces. It was performed at and part-produced by Sadler's Wells in London. It has also been performed in the United States, Germany, Italy, Australia, New Zealand and Taiwan, in addition to a tour of regional arts venues in Ireland.

"How To Be A Dancer in Seventy-Two Thousand Easy Lessons", a biographical work in collaboration with Keegan-Dolan's partner and longtime collaborator Rachel Poirier, followed in 2023. Unusually, he danced in the production.

Nobodaddy debuted in September 2024 at the Waterfront Hall in Belfast, followed by runs at the Dublin Theatre Festival and Sadler's Wells in London. It is named after a figure from the poetry of William Blake. US folk musician Sam Amidon supplied much of the music and performed in the show.

== Biography ==
Keegan-Dolan was raised in Clontarf, a suburb on Dublin's northside. His father is from Longford and Keegan-Dolan describes the county as home. His first dance lessons came late, at the age of 17 at Billie Barry School in Dublin. He moved to London to train in ballet at the Central School of Ballet.

He is married to Rachel Poirier, a dancer and longtime collaborator. They have two children. Their daughter has also performed in his work.

He was born Michael Dolan. His great-uncle, Edward Keegan, fought with the Irish Volunteers in 1916 and acted at the Abbey Theatre. Keegan-Dolan added his great-uncle's name to his own.

In addition to dance influences, he cites American musician David Byrne, Irish singer Liam Ó Maonlaí and Irish playwright Enda Walsh as having had an impact on his development.

== Work ==
=== Teac Damsa ===
- Nobodaddy (2024)
- How To Be A Dancer in Seventy-Two Thousand Easy Lessons (2023)
- Mám (2019)
- Swan Lake/Loch na hEala (2016)

=== Fabulous Beast Dance Theatre ===
- The Rite of Spring/Petruska (2014)
- Julius Caesar (2012)
- Rian (2011)
- Helen + Hell (2010)
- The Rite of Spring (2009)
- James Son of James (2007)
- The Bull (2005)
- Giselle (2003)
- The Christmas Show (2001)
- The Flowerbed (2000)
- Fragile (1999)
