= The Dead (1987 film) =

1987 film by John Huston

- Theatrical release poster
- Directed by: John Huston
- Written by: Tony Huston
- Based on: "The Dead" (1914 story) by James Joyce
- Produced by: Wieland Schulz-Keil; Chris Sievernich
- Starring: Anjelica Huston; Donal McCann; Helena Carroll; Cathleen Delany; Maria McDermottroe; Rachael Dowling; Ingrid Craigie; Dan O'Herlihy; Marie Kean; Donal Donnelly; Seán McClory; Frank Patterson
- Cinematography: Fred Murphy
- Edited by: Roberto Silvi
- Music by: Alex North
- Production companies: Vestron Pictures; Zenith Entertainment; Liffey Films; Channel 4; Delta Film
- Distributed by: Vestron Pictures
- Release dates: September 3, 1987 (Venice); December 11, 1987 (UK); December 17, 1987 (US)
- Running time: 83 minutes
- Country: United States; United Kingdom; West Germany
- Language: English
- Budget: $3.5 million or £2.26 million
- Box office: $4.4 million

The Dead is a 1987 period drama film directed by John Huston, written by his son Tony Huston, and starring his daughter Anjelica Huston, alongside an ensemble cast including Helena Carroll, Cathleen Delany, Dan O'Herlihy, Marie Kean, Donal Donnelly, Seán McClory, Frank Patterson, and Colm Meaney. The film takes place in Dublin in 1904 at an Epiphany party hosted by two sisters, Kate and Julia Morkan, and their niece Mary Jane. The story focuses on the academic Gabriel Conroy and his discovery of his wife Gretta's memories of a deceased lover, Michael Furey. It is an adaptation of the 1914 short story by James Joyce.

An international co-production between the United Kingdom, the United States, and West Germany, the film was Huston's last as director, and it was released several months after his death.

At the 60th Academy Awards, the film was nominated for Best Adapted Screenplay and Best Costume Design. John Huston posthumously won the award for Best Director at the 3rd Independent Spirit Awards, and Anjelica Huston won the award for Best Supporting Female at the same ceremony.

== Plot ==
On January 6, 1904, spinster sisters Kate and Julia Morkan and their unmarried niece, Mary Jane, host their annual Epiphany dinner party at their townhouse in Dublin. Horse-drawn carriages arrive with guests on the snowy night. Three of Mary Jane's music students, Miss O'Callaghan, Miss Furlong, and Miss Higgins, enter, accompanied by the young bachelors Joseph Kerrigan and Raymond Bergin, who Miss Furlong formally introduces to Kate and her frail older sister, Julia.

Dan Brown, the only Protestant invited to the party, arrives next, followed by Kate's favorite nephew, Gabriel Conroy, and his wife Gretta. Kate is worried that Freddy Malins will show up drunk, and when he does, Gabriel promptly escorts the man to the restroom to sober him up. After a few more drinks with Mr. Brown, Freddy goes to talk to his mother, who lives in Scotland with her daughter, and Mrs. Malins berates him for failing to meet her for tea earlier.

The guests dance, Mary Jane performs a virtuosic piece on the piano, and a guest named Mr. Grace recites a poem he calls "Broken Vows", which is a lament of lost love, during which Gretta's eyes grow misty. When the dancing restarts, Kate pairs Gabriel with Molly Ivors, an Irish nationalist colleague of his. She chides Gabriel for writing for an English newspaper and not learning Irish, and in response, he declares he is sick of Ireland.

While Gretta is attempting to persuade Gabriel that they should go on a summer trip to the Aran Islands that Molly mentioned, Kate announces that Julia is going to sing "Arrayed for the Bridal", an operatic piece from her "concert days". Despite her warbling voice, Freddy drunkenly gushes over the performance, and Kate complains about the Pope ending her sister's singing career in the church choir when he replaced the women with boys.

When it is time to eat, Molly leaves the party to attend a union meeting. During the sumptuous feast, conversation topics range from opera to morality. Freddy reliably utters the wrong things, but despite his nerves, Gabriel gives a rousing speech praising the wonderful Irish hospitality shown by Kate, Julia and Mary Jane.

As the guests are leaving, Mrs. Malins asks Gabriel to look after Freddy when she returns to Scotland, and Gabriel awakens Mr. Brown and puts him in a carriage with the Malins. When almost everyone is gone, Bartell D’Arcy, a "celebrated tenor" who had not sung anything all evening, sings "The Lass of Aughrim" to Miss O'Callaghan, and Gabriel watches Gretta as she listens transfixed from the stairs. Her pensiveness continues in the carriage on the way to the hotel where she and Gabriel are staying the night, and she dismisses Gabriel's attempts to cheer her.

In their hotel room, Gabriel asks Gretta what she is thinking, and she explains that when she was young and lived with her grandmother in Galway, a boy she knew named Michael Furey used to sing "The Lass of Aughrim". She says she feels responsible for his death at age seventeen as, on the night before she returned to the convent in Dublin where she went to school, Michael left his sick bed and stood outside her window in the cold and rain to say goodbye, and he died a week later. Gretta cries herself to sleep, and Gabriel thinks that he has never felt love like the love Michael must have felt for Gretta and that it is better to die young and passionate than to wither and fade away like Julia, and presumably he will. Looking out the window, he imagines the snow falling all over Ireland, "upon all the living and the dead."

== Cast ==
- Anjelica Huston as Gretta Conroy
- Donal McCann as Gabriel Conroy
- Helena Carroll as Aunt Kate Morkan
- Cathleen Delany as Aunt Julia Morkan
- Maria McDermottroe as Molly Ivors
- Rachael Dowling as Lily
- Ingrid Craigie as Mary Jane Morkan
- Dan O'Herlihy as Dan Brown
- Marie Kean as Mrs. Malins
- Donal Donnelly as Theodore Alfred "Freddy" Malins
- Seán McClory as Mr. Grace
- Frank Patterson as Bartell D'Arcy
- Katherine O'Toole as Miss Furlong
- Bairbre Dowling as Miss Higgins
- Maria Hayden as Miss O'Callaghan
- Cormac O'Herlihy as Joseph Kerrigan
- Colm Meaney as Raymond Bergin
- Lyda Anderson as Miss Daly
- Paul Grant as Young Gentleman
- Redmond Gleeson as Nightporter

== Adaptation ==
Tony Huston's screenplay was a fairly close adaptation of the original story by James Joyce, with some alterations made to the dialogue to aid the narrative for cinema audiences. The most significant change to the story was the inclusion of a new character, Mr. Grace, who, in the film, recites an English translation of the eighth-century Middle Irish poem "Donal Óg".

== Production ==
=== Development ===
Weiland Schulz-Keil and Chris Sievernich, the producers of the film, had previously raised the money for John Huston's 1984 film Under the Volcano. Screen rights to "The Dead" were purchased from the Joyce estate for $60,000.

Siobhán McKenna was originally cast in the film, but died two months before principal photography began.

=== Filming ===
Filming began in Santa Clarita, California on January 19, 1987. Huston originally planned to shoot the film entirely on-location in Dublin and Ardmore Studios. However, due to his declining health, the interiors were all filmed on a soundstage at the California Institute of the Arts, while a second unit led by Huston's son Danny and director of photography Fred Murphy shot exterior location footage in Dublin.

According to Pauline Kael, "Huston directed the movie, at eighty, from a wheelchair, jumping up to look through the camera, with oxygen tubes trailing from his nose to a portable generator; most of the time, he had to watch the actors on a video monitor outside the set and use a microphone to speak to the crew. Yet he went into dramatic areas that he'd never gone into before - funny, warm family scenes that might be thought completely out of his range. Huston never before blended his actors so intuitively, so musically."

Huston's health made him uninsurable, so his friend Karel Reisz agreed to sign on as a stand-by director in case he was unable to complete production.

Anjelica Huston said her father remained a filmmaking virtuoso despite his ill health: "He was so sick, but he could literally do it with his eyes closed. He knew when we were going to get a take way long before the camera rolled. I mean the timing was so precise that he could tell everything, exactly how it was going to go." The pressures of filming and watching her father's health deteriorate had an adverse effect on her own health, and she developed Epstein-Barr syndrome during production.

== Release ==
The Dead premiered at the 44th Venice International Film Festival on September 3, 1987. The film premiered in London on December 11, 1987. Vestron Pictures released the film theatrically in the United States the following week on December 17, 1987.

=== Home media ===
The Dead was released on DVD by Lionsgate on November 3, 2009, but the initial pressing was missing nearly ten minutes of footage from early in the film. After word of this was posted on various websites, Lionsgate eventually corrected the mistake and released the full-length version.

The Criterion Collection released the film on 4K UHD and Blu-ray on January 20, 2026.

== Reception ==
=== Box office ===
The Dead earned $69,074 from six theaters in the United States during its opening weekend. The film went on to gross a total of $4,370,078.

=== Critical response ===
The Dead received mostly positive critical reviews. The film holds a 94% rating on Rotten Tomatoes, based on 33 reviews.

Vincent Canby of The New York Times uniformly praised the film, writing: "The Dead is so fine, in unexpected ways, that it almost demands a re-evaluation of Huston's entire body of work." Sheila Benson of the Los Angeles Times also lauded the film, writing: "Those who worried about James Joyce’s classic should relax. Huston’s presentation of the story, a work which flows like music to its great and enveloping close, is impeccable."

In his memoir, published in English as Long Take, Japanese filmmaker Akira Kurosawa cited The Dead as one of his 100 favorite films.

=== Accolades ===
Institution	Year	Category	Nominee(s)	Result	Ref.
Academy Awards	1988	Best Writing, Screenplay Based on Material from Another Medium	Tony Huston	Nominated	
Academy Awards	1988	Best Costume Design	Dorothy Jeakins	Nominated	
Bodil Awards	1989	Best Non-European Film		Won	
Fotogramas de Plata	1989	Best Foreign Film		Won	
Independent Spirit Awards	1988	Best Director	John Huston	Won	
Independent Spirit Awards	1988	Best Screenplay	Tony Huston	Nominated	
Independent Spirit Awards	1988	Best Supporting Female	Anjelica Huston	Won	
Independent Spirit Awards	1988	Best Cinematography	Fred Murphy	Nominated	
London Film Critics' Circle	1989	Director of the Year	John Huston	Won	
National Society of Film Critics	1988	Best Film		Won	
Tokyo International Film Festival	1987	Special Achievement Award	John Huston	Won	

== In popular culture ==
In Pedro Almodóvar's The Room Next Door, both the film and short story are of great significance to the narrative. In one scene, Martha (Tilda Swinton) and Ingrid (Julianne Moore) watch the film, and Martha recites the ending.

The ending is parodied in the Father Ted episode "Grant Unto Him Eternal Rest" in which Father Ted Crilly (Dermot Morgan) recites the ending.

A sample of the phrase "6:00 on a Christmas Morning, and for what?" is prominently featured on "6:00", the opening track of Dream Theater's 1994 album Awake.

== See also ==
- John Huston filmography
