= You Are Not My Mother =

2021 film by Kate Dolan

- Theatrical release poster
- Directed by: Kate Dolan
- Written by: Kate Dolan
- Produced by: Deirdre Levins
- Starring: Hazel Doupe; Carolyn Bracken; Jordanne Jones; Jade Jordan; Paul Reid; Ingrid Craigie
- Cinematography: Narayan Van Maele
- Edited by: John Cutler
- Music by: Die Hexen
- Production company: Fantastic Films
- Distributed by: Wildcard Distribution
- Release date: 13 September 2021 (TIFF)
- Running time: 93 minutes
- Country: Ireland
- Language: English
- Box office: $56,249

You Are Not My Mother is a 2021 Irish psychological horror film written and directed by Kate Dolan, in her directorial debut. The film stars Hazel Doupe as Char, a young woman at odds with her grandmother Rita (Ingrid Craigie) after her mother Angela (Carolyn Bracken) briefly goes missing, only to return soon afterward with a radically changed personality.

The film premiered in the Midnight Madness stream at the 2021 Toronto International Film Festival, where it was named first runner up for the People's Choice Award: Midnight Madness.

== Plot ==
An opening flashback scene shows Rita Delaney taking her infant granddaughter Charlotte (“Char”) into the woods, while the baby’s mother Angela protests. In the woods, Rita sits the baby on the ground and lights a ring of fire around her. She watches as the baby screams.

In the present day, the teenage Char lives with her mother and grandmother; her uncle Aaron lives nearby and visits occasionally. The household is somewhat dysfunctional; Rita is in poor health, Angela is depressed and spends much of her time in bed, and there is no food in the house. Char attends a girls’ Catholic high school. Although academically gifted, she does not fit in with the other students, who consider her their social inferior, and she is subjected to bullying. One morning, driving Char to school, Angela tells her daughter that "she can't do this anymore". Her car is later found abandoned, with no sign of Angela. The family report the disappearance to the police, but they are not able to offer much help. However, Angela returns within a few days, strangely altered. Her depression is gone, and she is cheerful, dressing up and cooking dinner for the family. Rita seems suspicious of these changes in Angela and deliberately upsets the pan of soup that Angela had prepared, so the family are obliged to eat the chips that Aaron has brought over instead. But Angela appears to have little appetite and sits staring sullenly at her mother.

Char witnesses several instances of increasingly bizarre behavior in the "new" Angela and becomes frightened. Her uncle Aaron is poisoned by Angela, which leads to him being hospitalized. In the meantime, Char is forging a friendship with one of her former bullies, Suzanne. Char confides in Suzanne about the changes in Angela; Suzanne in turn tells Char how her own mother died when she was very young. One evening, Rita tells Char the story of her past; when Char was a baby, Rita realized she had been swapped with a “changeling”. The only way to get the real Char back was to place her near fire, hence the fiery ring ritual in the woods. This worked, but Char sustained a small burn to her cheek. Her family told her the resultant scar was a birthmark.

Rita tells Char that the "new" Angela is also a changeling, and thus the fire ritual must be repeated to get the real Angela back. Although Char appears to agree, when she sees Angela bound and gagged and tied to a bed she is appalled. Despite her grandmother’s protests, Char frees Angela, only to realize too late that Rita spoke the truth, and that this is not the "real" Angela. The changeling kills Rita. Char runs out of the house, but is waylaid by the school bullies, who force her inside an unlit Halloween bonfire. However, the bullies are scared off by the approach of the changeling Angela. Angela pushes her way into the bonfire to get to Char, but Char sets the structure alight. Angela burns while Char is rescued from the flames by Suzanne. In the final scene, Angela is restored to her true self, and Char makes her a lucky token from twigs "to keep her safe", as her grandmother had once made for her. Mother and daughter are happy to be together again, ready to move forward with their lives.

== Cast ==
- Hazel Doupe as Charlotte "Char" Delaney
  - Lucie Doran as young Char
- Carolyn Bracken as Angela Delaney
- Paul Reid as Aaron Delaney
- Jade Jordan as Ms. Devlin
- Ingrid Craigie as Rita Delaney
- Jordanne Jones as Suzanne O'Conner
- Katie White as Kelly
- Aoife Spratt as Officer Jenny
- Martin O'Sullivan as Frank
- Miriam Devitt as TV sitcom - Witch
- Florence Adebambo as Amanda
- Colin Peppard as Jamie
- Madi O'Carroll as Tour Guide

== Reception ==
On the review aggregator website Rotten Tomatoes, 88% of 78 critics' reviews are positive, with an average rating of 7.30/10. The website's consensus reads: "Smartly creepy, You Are Not My Mother engages with a number of thought-provoking themes without sacrificing chills." Metacritic, which uses a weighted average, assigned the film a score of 74 out of 100, based on 16 critics, indicating "generally favorable reviews".
