= Unicorn: Warriors Eternal =

American animated fantasy TV series

- Genre: Drama; Fantasy; Steampunk; Action; Adventure
- Created by: Genndy Tartakovsky
- Written by: Darrick Bachman; Genndy Tartakovsky
- Directed by: Genndy Tartakovsky
- Voices of: Hazel Doupe; Demari Hunte; Tom Milligan
- Composers: Tyler Bates; Joanne Higginbottom
- Country of origin: United States
- Original language: English
- No. of seasons: 1
- No. of episodes: 10

Production
- Executive producers: Sam Register; Genndy Tartakovsky
- Running time: 21–23 minutes; 33 minutes (episode 7 only)
- Production company: Cartoon Network Studios

Original release
- Network: Adult Swim
- Release: May 5 – June 30, 2023

Unicorn: Warriors Eternal is an American adult animated fantasy television series created by Genndy Tartakovsky and aired on Cartoon Network's night-time programming block Adult Swim. The series stars the voices of Hazel Doupe, Demari Hunte, and Tom Milligan. The visuals of the series are heavily influenced by the works of Osamu Tezuka and Max Fleischer.

Tartakovsky originally conceived Unicorn: Warriors Eternal in his early days at Cartoon Network Studios. The series took almost 20 years to get made, with Tartakovsky pitching it to various studios with little to no success. It was eventually picked up by Cartoon Network and HBO Max and was publicly announced in October 2020. It is produced by Cartoon Network Studios, with animation services by Studio La Cachette in France and Studio Zmei in Bulgaria.

Unicorn: Warriors Eternal was originally set to air on Cartoon Network as part of its ACME Night programming block but was eventually moved to Adult Swim. The first two episodes premiered on May 5, 2023, and released on HBO Max the following day. (Note: Adult Swim lists the series as premiering on May 4, 2023, at 12:00 a.m. (24:00) EDT/PDT, which is effectively May 5.) The first season concluded on June 30, 2023, with no announcement regarding any potential second season despite ending on a cliffhanger.

== Synopsis ==
Unicorn: Warriors Eternal revolves around a team of ancestral heroes, blessed by a Unicorn spirit, who are tasked with protecting the world from an ultimate evil.

In ancient times, a powerful sorceress named Melinda, an elf prince named Edred who wields a magical sword, and a mystic monk named Seng fight a formidable evil. Realizing they can't defeat the evil in a single lifetime, the father of Melinda, Merlin, introduces Copernicus, a Victorian-era automaton filled with all types of capabilities, who can hold the heroes' souls and transfer them into new hosts in future generations.

Many years later, in 1890s Victorian London (which is also steampunk-infused), the ultimate evil begins to re-manifest. Copernicus awakens the souls of the heroes, but somehow, this time there’s a twist: they are reincarnated into the youngest hosts ever chosen, including a young woman named Emma Fairfax. The new hosts, struggle with their new identities, fragmented memories, and the responsibilities of their past lives. Emma, in particular, who shares her body with Melinda, resists her destiny, wanting to return to her normal life. The team must contend with the re-emerging evil, which takes various fantastical forms (e.g., a nine-tailed fox, zombie elephants, and animated statues), all while navigating the challenges of their new bodies and the steampunk-infused Victorian London.

== Cast and characters ==
=== The Order of Unicorn ===
- Hazel Doupe as Emma Fairfax, the daughter of the wealthy Fairfax family and the current host of the soul of Melinda, a powerful sorceress. However, due to the early reawakening of Melinda by circumstance, both Emma and Melinda's personalities conflict with each other, and she ends up losing control of her powers during any form of emotional outburst.
  - Grey DeLisle as the original Melinda.
  - Marley Cherry Hilborne as a child version of the original Melinda, who was inadvertently responsible for the creation of the Evil.
- Demari Hunte as Alfie, an orphan who lived in the remains of an abandoned school and the current host of the soul of Seng, a cosmic monk. Being reincarnated in a child has made the cosmic plane too much to comprehend, leaving him in a dream-like stupor, though he eventually comes around and becomes far more focused and aware.
  - Alain Uy as the original Seng. He is credited as "Ancient Egypt Seng".
  - Victor Alli as an adult version of Alfie in the cosmic realm.
- Tom Milligan as Dimitri Dynamo, a street magician and the current host of the soul of Edred, an elf warrior. Unlike the others, Dimitri managed to retain most of Edred's memories and power, though he admits even his mind feels "clouded".
  - Jacob Dudman as the original Edred. He is credited as "Ancient Egypt/Original Edred".
- Copernicus, a steam-powered robot who brings the three souls together throughout history, but in the present of 1890 was forced to do so earlier than usual. He is unable to talk and instead communicates in a series of clicks and whistles.

=== Recurring ===
- DeLisle as:
  - June Way, a mysterious kitsune somehow connected to the Evil who can appear in a small or large quadruped form or take the form of an anthropomorphic fox woman,
  - Clarice Leydoux, a member of the "Reawakened" who claims to be descended from a prior host of Melinda.
- Jeremy Crutchley as Merlin, the legendary wizard of the court of King Arthur, and the one who first brought the Order of the Unicorn together. It was Merlin who discovered Copernicus during a quest through time. He is later revealed to be Melinda's father.
- George Webster as Winston, Emma's childhood sweetheart and fiancé. He is later bitten and turned into a werewolf during his search for Emma.
- Ron Bottita as Lord Edward Fairfax, Emma's father.
- Rosalind Ayres as:
  - Lady Katherine Fairfax, Emma's mother.
  - Agatha, the mayor of London.
- Gildart Jackson as Inspector General Hastings, the head of the police investigating the supernatural goings on in London.
- Peta Johnson as Morgan, the legendary sorceress and Melinda's mother, inadvertently turned into the core of the entity known as the Evil.
- Sunkrish Bala as Rakshasa, a Bengal tiger demi-god who protected the Indian jungle.
- Jack Bandeira as Alewulf, Edred's younger brother. He is the king of the Northern Elves.
- Uy as Lao Xi Sheng, a member of the "Reawakened" who claims to be descended from a prior host of Seng.

== Production ==
=== Development ===
Genndy Tartakovsky conceived Unicorn: Warriors Eternal in his early days at Cartoon Network Studios. He stated: "All the projects we worked on - Dexter's Laboratory, Samurai Jack, and Sym-Bionic Titan - were like a training ground getting us ready for this series." According to Tartakovsky, it was difficult to get the series off the ground, and it took almost 20 years to be made. After he left Cartoon Network, no studio wanted to work with him, and every time he got one to back the project, it would fail to make progress, first with Cartoon Network, then with Netflix, before finally being picked up by HBO Max. As a result of the prolonged development phase of the series, a lot of ideas that were present in the original pitch were changed by Tartakovsky since he felt that they had already been done in a lot of media since then and wanted to avoid being cliché. One example is the idea of technology versus magic and the robot rising, which took a backseat over the years because they had already been explored in popular films such as I, Robot (2004) and The Terminator (1984). Tartakovsky came up with ideas for multiple seasons of Unicorn: Warriors Eternal and eventually pitched it as a four-season story. He explained that "the world is so ripe and it's so brand new that you can do so much." He added, "If we get tired of these characters, we can go back to another time period or they're re-awoken in the future."

In October 2020, Deadline Hollywood reported that HBO Max and Cartoon Network had greenlit the series together, alongside Tiny Toons Looniversity and three projects from Mo Willems. The series was described as a supernatural animated series inspired by myths and lore from around the world, and some details regarding the premise were disclosed. Sam Register executive produces alongside Tartakovsky, and Tyler Bates and Joan Higginbottom provide the series' music. Animation services for the series were handled by Studio La Cachette in France and Studio Zmei in Bulgaria.

=== Inspirations ===
Tartakovsky drew inspiration from Walt Disney's Snow White and the Seven Dwarfs (1937), particularly the funeral scene, for being emotional yet featuring cartoony and goofy dwarves. He stated: "There's a dirty word in animation of being 'too cartoony'. They say that you can't feel emotion if it looks too goofy. And that's bullshit. And so that's what I really wanted to do is have this very cartoony thing, but the emotions are real. And the drama really is a soap opera almost, it's so heightened." The story was partly influenced by Tartakovsky watching his children grow up, which he thought the series lengthy development benefited from.

The look of Unicorn Warrior Eternal was inspired by the works of Max Fleischer and Osamu Tezuka. Tartakovsky acknowledged that Tezuka himself was influenced by Fleischer and Disney cartoons and described the look as an "incestual pool of beloved characters." He started drawing influences from Tezuka's work when he was writing an Astro Boy script for Sony in 2004 and read the manga. Stephen DeStefano, who worked with Tartakovsky on Sym-Bionic Titan, Primal, and his cancelled Popeye film, served as character designer. The two wanted the series to have an "old aesthetic but told in a very contemporary way with contemporary filmmaking." The works of Hayao Miyazaki and general steampunk aesthetics also inspired Tartakovsky.

== Episodes ==
Note: All episodes of the series were directed and written by Genndy Tartakovsky. (Note: Darrick Bachman assisted Tartakovsky with screenwriting)

No.	Title	Storyboarded by	Original release date	Prod. code	U.S. viewers (millions)
1	"The Awakening"	Genndy Tartakovsky	May 5, 2023	101	0.23
2	"The Awakening"	Genndy Tartakovsky	May 5, 2023	102	0.19
Part 1: The Unicorns battle an evil spirit in ancient Egypt. Before its defeat, the Evil injures Melinda and escapes. Merlin arrives and summons the mute, steam-powered robot Copernicus from the future, and plans to reincarnate the souls of the Unicorns into the future to continue the fight. In 1890, Copernicus activates and fights off automatons who desecrate his grave. Copernicus then ventures into the steampunk city of London and forcibly transforms a young aristocrat—Emma Fairfax into Melinda, at her wedding, before she can marry her betrothed, Winston. Now suffering from amnesia and split personality, Emma looks to Copernicus for answers. Part 2: Melinda/Emma and Copernicus arrive at the orphanage where Copernicus transforms one of the orphan ruffians, Alfie, into the Cosmic monk Seng. Alfie's childhood persona starts to deteriorate Seng's capabilities and cosmic awareness. As they venture across the city, Melinda/Emma stumbles upon an amateur illusionist, Dmitri, which causes Copernicus to transform Dmitri into the Elven warrior Eldred. Both Seng and Edred remember their past selves and are surprised to learn that Melinda/Emma has no memory of hers. Their conversation is interrupted by the deceased Royal Indian Elephant, Lulu, summoned by a mysterious Fox Woman named June Way to test the Unicorns' ability. The team is overwhelmed by Lulu's strength until Winston's arrival (who was looking for Emma) prompts Melinda/Emma to summon Melinda's power to destroy Lulu—but it results in mass casualties and destruction in the process. Ashamed of injuring Winston, Melinda/Emma lashed out at the trios and flies off while June Way observes the entire event and ominously predicts that their current selves are their last reincarnation.
3	"A Fateful Encounter"	Genndy Tartakovsky	May 12, 2023	103	0.19
The Evil's automatons ambush and raid a shipment of Greek warrior statues. Following the Unicorns' battle with Lulu and Melinda's/Emma's actions, Scotland Yard Chief Inspector General Hastings denies the existence of magic towards the press, believing the Unicorns are a trouble-making gang of parlor trick practitioners. Subsequently, numerous magicians, illusionists, and spiritual practitioners are arrested for interrogation. Meanwhile, Melinda/Emma tries to sort out everything she's going through in Emma's life—having run-ins with her desperate parents, finding Winston at the hospital, and then being chased by the police. Continuing to flee, she meets a fake medium who unintentionally helps draw out Melinda's spirit, allowing Emma to finally confront her for the first time. Arguing over the control of their body, Emma demands Melinda leave her body to get her own life back, while Melinda insists on the importance of her own calling and demands Emma relinquish herself. At that moment, after being briefly chased by the police, Copernicus, Seng, and Edred, who were tracking Melinda/Emma, arrive, causing Melinda's soul to return to Emma's body. Suddenly, the animated Greek statues arrive, and while the rest of the Unicorns engage them, Emma refuses to let herself and Melinda get involved unless Melinda leaves her body. But due to the increasing danger, she reluctantly and begrudgingly allows Melinda to unleash her power, finishing the fight. However, due to Seng's connection to the cosmic realm, Seng is attacked by Evil through it, as a nine-tailed fox he encountered earlier. Meanwhile, Edred spots June Way on a rooftop glaring down at them.
4	"What Lies Beneath"	Genndy Tartakovsky & Ian Higginbotham	May 19, 2023	104	0.18
With Seng defeated in the cosmic realm and rendered briefly unconscious, the Unicorns discover the fox woman is linked to the Evil and pursue it, but are lured onto an old galleon ship with a magic barrier that negates Seng's connection to the cosmic realm and is cast away into the open seas. Due to Emma's reluctance to try unleashing her full power after inadvertently nearly harming innocents during the chase, Melinda/Emma is unable to use it to free the Unicorns from the ship, so they search for another way off. During the search, Melinda/Emma, and Edred meet with the unexpected arrival of Winston. Winston and Edred argue over their respective love for Melinda and Emma, which starts to discomfort Melinda/Emma. The trio's argument is interrupted and they are attacked by the haunted ghost ship. Meanwhile, Copernicus and Seng discover that due to Seng's connection to the cosmic realm, Seng's existence conversely also depends on the cosmic realm. With the barrier negating said connection, Seng's very existence begins fading away as he gradually becomes incorporeal. Copernicus and Seng are ambushed by undead pirates, which they fight off as Seng's body continues to fade. Melinda/Emma, Edred, and Winston flee back to Copernicus and Seng on the deck of the ship, but it grabs Melinda/Emma and pulls her back below deck engulfing her in a swirl of wind and debris. As she screams in pain, Melinda/Emma experiences a flash of Melinda's memory, causing her to lash out and free herself, which inadvertently summons an octopus monster that destroys the ship's magic barrier—incapacitating the undead pirates and restoring Seng's connection to the cosmic realm. However, the monster goes on a rampage—destroying the ship and another nearby ship, and the Unicorns fly off to stop the creature—leaving Winston behind, though he is determined to follow.
5	"The Past Within"	Genndy Tartakovsky	May 26, 2023	105	0.20
The Evil feels overpowered by Melinda's powers and questions her fate before the octopus monster attacks where she is. The Evil flees as the Unicorns arrive to fight the monster. As the Unicorns try to send the monster away from the city, Edred demands Melinda/Emma use her powers to banish the creature but she is hesitant to do so. As Melinda/Emma begins to unleash Melinda's powers once more, the octopus monster suddenly swats her away, and she crashes into a building and loses consciousness. While unconscious, Emma's persona wakes up and meets Melinda's younger self. Melinda tells Emma that she (Melinda) was born with powerful magic and was advised by her father to keep it secret and not use it. Meanwhile, Winston, who was left stranded at sea by the Unicorns, finds an old fisherman's boat. The reclusive fisherman frantically stops Winston from getting onto his vessel and warns him not to return. Afterward, the fed-up Winston returns to the boat only to discover the fisherman is a werewolf that bites him before he escapes. Melinda decides to help Emma return home and takes Emma to her father's study, revealing her father is Merlin, who enters the room after Melinda accidentally opens the portal. As Merlin observes Emma's presence, he explains Emma had time traveled from the future by accident. Morgan le Fay, Melinda's mother, arrives at their doorstep. When Melinda reveals her secrecy, Morgan angrily scolds Merlin and decides to take Melinda's powers to ensure her daughter's safety—which Merlin opposes. Melinda chooses to keep her powers, repelling and overpowering her mother's magic. As a result, Melinda's powers transform Morgan into the Evil that the Unicorns fight, leaving Merlin heartbroken. Melinda/Emma regains consciousness in the future and rejoins the fight, but gets distracted by Merlin's last words—an accusation implying she did something horribly wrong. While distracted, the octopus monster shatters Copernicus into pieces—which causes Melinda/Emma to unleash her powers and obliterate the octopus monster.
6	"The Mystery of Secrets"	Ian Higginbotham	June 2, 2023	106	0.20
Following the aftermath of the Octopus monster rampage, the mayor of London demands Hastings about the incident. Sailor Jim, who was secretly paid from the benefactor, informs them that he spotted a Fox from the dock and located her hideout at the abandoned church. As the bobbies arrived at the church, June Way ambushes them and quickly escapes, feeling betrayed. The Unicorns try seeking help from a robot factory on repairing Copernicus but remain helpless. Seng ventures into the sea of time to find answers on reactivating Copernicus. With Seng's departure, Melinda/Emma and Edred are invited by the automaton butler, Dashwood, to help repair Copernicus. Dashwood transports them to an isolated lab and introduces his inventor and benefactor Otto who is willing to fix Copernicus, while implying to invent him later on. During their wait, Emma tries to reach out and reason with Melinda over what happened in the past not being her fault, but Melinda not only would not allow it but now also wants nothing to do with Emma at all. Otto successfully rebuilds Copernicus but his consciousness remained mysteriously powerless. June Way attacks them and Melinda clashes with it allowing Edred to use his sword Twillion to truly vanquish the Evil once again. Seng returns from the cosmic realm and revealed Edred's knowledge on fixing Copernicus, confirming they must travel to Edred's home, along with a cryptic message, "The blood to remake will flow for all time."
7	"The Heart of Kings"	Genndy Tartakovsky	June 9, 2023 (Note: Episode 7 is a 33 minute special.)	107	0.20
In the past, the King Elf of the Northern Elves and the Eastern elves's regent Thraen set up an arranged marriage to secure their alliances. Edred, being the eldest son of the King, was disapprove to marry Threan's daughter and chose to leave his proposal over his love for Melinda. In the present, the Unicorns arrive at the forest, which is destroyed. After encountering Eastern and Northern elves in territorial conflict, Edred is reunited with his younger brother Aelwulf. Aelwulf informs Edred following his departure half of the forest was destroyed, the two elf tribes went to war, the king grew weaker through an ancestral sleep and Thraen stole the heart of the forest to obtain power, so Edred agrees to stay and fix the unbroken line. The rest of Unicorn are put in a cell, reuniting with Merlin who was arrested for his accusation on Edred's departure. They inform Merlin of the Evil's defeat, but Copernicus remains inactive. Edred encounters Twillion's swordsmith, Gobi, when he summons the sword. Enraged by Edred's departure from the wedding, Gobi vowed to keep it if Edred ever returned. Edred threatens Gobi into reluctantly returning Twillion and acknowledging Gobi's promise of hospitality, but he strips the sword's magic informing Edred that it will restore itself once Edred fulfills his oath. Emma convinces Melinda to reconcile with Merlin after what happened with Morgan, and scolds Merlin for blaming his daughter when in fact he himself, the greatest wizard, could not stop this while Melinda was only a child. Realizing his error, Merlin apologizes to Melinda and their relationship is restored. After Seng manages to free everyone from the cell, Merlin sees where Edred is and takes them all to him. Edred and Aelwulf learn that Thraen hired a necromancer to bestow the heart for himself, with Seng's cryptic message being revealed to be part of the necromancer's incantation. After defeating Thraen and the necromancer, Edred recovers the heart and fulfills his oath, restoring the forest in the process. This allows Merlin to revive Copernicus from his magic and the restored heart. However, it turns out the Evil is not yet destroyed, evident by how only after it is destroyed do the Unicorns' souls return to Copernicus until the Evil returns again. Since Edred is having trouble facing parallel lives, the Unicorns devise a plan by reincarnating Aelwulf's soul into Edred's original body and fake his death to help maintain the unbroken line while Edred can remain in his host's body. Aelwulf gives Twillion to them leaving Edred despondent for his self-imposed exile. Merlin suddenly leaves to track down the Evil, promising to return.
8	"Darkness Before the Dawn"	Ian Higginbotham	June 16, 2023	108	0.13
While they are on the train, Edred is still upset that he can not go home again and his own body is no longer with him. He begins to question what will happen to them once they successfully destroy the Evil. They suddenly hear a commotion and they run to see an attack by a werewolf, who is revealed to be Winston. Melinda confront Edred who left him stranded instead of placing him to safety. Winston tells them what happened and is now cursed to be a werewolf, Winston says this is a good thing as he is part of the group so he can be with Emma. Merlin arrives and tells them the Evil is Otto and they go to the jungle, Merlin informed them as he continues his search, he joins up with the guardian tiger spirit Rakshasa and destroys Otto's ship by which he didn't mention what happened to them in the end. Merlin decides to splits the group up to investigate the wreckage. As Edred and Winston go together, Winston talks to Edred of his actions but because of Edred he has become one of them now, Edred then tells him once they leave their hosts Emma becomes normal again while Winston has his curse, their arguing leads them to a fight. Seng and Copernicus discovers the fallen form of the Rakshasa and the crushed corpse of Otto, which the Rakshasa's soul reveals to Seng not everything is as it seem. Melinda asks Merlin to remove Winston's curse for Emma's sake. However, Merlin has been possessed by the Evil and begins attacking Melinda causing Winston and Edred's to stop their fight and regroup with Seng and Copernicus.
9	"A Love's Last Light"	Genndy Tartakovsky	June 23, 2023	109	0.22
In the past, Edred first met Merlin and Melinda after vanquishing the Evil that threatened his kingdom. Despite Melinda's reluctance, Edred accepted Merlin's offer on forming the team to defeat the Evil. In the present, the Unicorns join together to free Melinda and overpower the possessed Merlin. However, the Evil departs Merlin and successfully possesses Seng, causing him to transports the Unicorns, which include Winston and Merlin, into the Cosmic Realm. Stranded, the Unicorns are reunited by Rakshasa and Seng in Alfie's adulthood while hiding from the Evil. The Unicorns learn that the Evil corrupted and controlled the Cosmic Realm for twenty years with Seng and Rakshasa unsuccessfully attempting to defeat it during that time; they also learn that the Evil now plans to take over time itself which, as Merlin realizes, will lead to the complete end of everything. Edred feels remorse over the loss of Melinda/Emma, having shown impress with Winston's werewolf appearance. Melinda/Emma discusses Winston for her dual identity and decides to accept herself for who she truly is as one. The Evil ambushes the Unicorns, who make their final stand against it. The Evil gains its upper hand by separating both Melinda's soul and Emma's body from each other. With Melinda's soul retrieved by Copernicus, Emma falls into her parents' mansion, desperate to return.
10	"The End of the Beginning"	Genndy Tartakovsky	June 30, 2023	110	0.20
Emma's parents force their desperate daughter to remain home, paranoid by her sanity. Determined to return to the Cosmic realm, Emma quickly escapes from her home before her parents notice and arrives at the Mystic Row to seek help. The medium Darvish, whom she encountered earlier, refuses to help her and reveals that most of the shop owners who practice magic are charlatans. Emma is soon encountered by the Reawakened, Clarice Leydoux and Lao Xi Sheng. They inform Emma that they were the descendants of the host reincarnated by the Unicorns and kept knowledge about the Unicorns for centuries. Emma learns that the Heart of the Forest might send her to the Cosmic Realm. Emma, Clarice and Lao Xi arrive at the Elvish Kingdom and threaten Aelwulf for his secrecy. As Emma uses the Heart, she successfully arrives at the Cosmic Realm and reunites with the Unicorns. With Rakshasa believed to have been killed, the Unicorns were left stranded for over four years out of despair by which the Evil managed to gain control of the entire realm. Refusing to accept their defeat, Emma suggests to fuse the souls of everyone into her body to gain enough power to defeat the Evil. With Emma and Melinda restored, Copernicus transfers the souls of her allies (including Merlin and Winston) to Melinda as they overpower the Evil's influence. Melinda suddenly hears her mother's pleas and discovers that Morgan is the Evil's heart. Reunited, Melinda tries to separate Morgan but they are unable to remove her due to the Evil's resistance, with Morgan begging her daughter to kill her to destroy the Evil. The Evil then disappears into the black hole, and the united Unicorn members separate with Seng back to his normal child self, and thrust back out of the cosmic realm. As a result of Melinda's unwillingness to kill Morgan, the entire world has been turned into a dystopia ruled by the Evil where all of history, past and future, is running all at once; but Melinda vows to continue their fight to save her mother.

== Release ==
Footage of the series was shown at Annecy International Animation Film Festival in June 2022. The series was previewed at New York Comic Con in October 2022.

Unicorn: Warriors Eternal was originally set to premiere on Cartoon Network as part of its ACME Night programming block, but was instead moved to Adult Swim. The first two episodes premiered at midnight ET on May 5, 2023, and was available on HBO Max the following day. Despite being Adult Swim's top-rated new animated show and best launch in over a year according to the network demographic data, high praise from critics and fans, and the tenth episode ending with a cliffhanger, a second season has yet to be officially announced. However, Tartakovsky has been quoted as saying that he has prepared for multiple seasons of the series. "Fortunately for Unicorn, I was able to do multiple ideas, multiple season ideas, because the world is so ripe and it's so brand new that you can do so much…we're going to do one season first, and hopefully it'll work and people will like it, and then we'll continue on."

In addition to its Adult Swim airings, the series has run weekly encores on Toonami, as well as rerunning on Cartoon Network's ACME Night programming block. Michael Ouweleen claims this is because "By programming this during peak hours and re-airing across multiple dayparts, we are ensuring that all generations of animation fans can see this event-level series."

== Reception ==
=== Critical response ===
On Rotten Tomatoes, the first season has an approval rating of 100% based on reviews from 8 critics.

=== Accolades ===
The series received a 2023 Children's and Family Emmy Awards with Stephen DeStefano won award for Individual Achievement in Animation.
