= Cathleen Delany =

Actor

- Born: 21 July 1907; Dublin, Ireland
- Died: 19 June 1997 (aged 89); Dublin, Ireland
- Occupation: Actress
- Spouse: John O'Dea

Cathleen Delany (21 July 1907 – 19 June 1997) was an Irish actress of stage and screen.

== Life ==
Born Kathleen Mary Delany to journalist Alfred Delany and his wife, Kathleen Mary Kilgannon of 98 Marlboro Rd. in Dublin. She was professionally known as Cathleen Delany.

She was one of the principal players of the first decade of the Gate Theatre's existence. Considered a talented singer she began in local theatre with the Rathmines and Rathgar Musical Society. From there she auditioned for the Gate. She debuted on the Gate stage in The Agamemnon of Aeschylus in 1933. Delany worked with Hilton Edwards and Micheál Mac Liammóir during their London season in 1934 and in 1936 she went with them on their first tour of Egypt. When they returned she began touring Ireland with Longford Productions. She moved to the screen and performed in a wide variety of roles. Her last stage performance was in May 1988 in the Gate in Brian Friel's adaptation of Fathers and Sons.

In the 1970s, Delany also started to work for film and television. She played the elderly Aunt Julia in The Dead (1987), John Huston's adaption of the James Joyce short story. Her last role was in the television series Jake's Progress in 1995.

Delany married John O'Dea, and raised her niece Hazel Roost from infancy. She died at age 89.

== Performances ==
=== Screen ===
- 1972 A War of Children (TV film) - Mrs. Doyle
- 1978 Last of Summer (TV) - Dotey Cregan
- 1983 Attracta - Sarah Crookham
- 1984 The Irish R.M. (TV) - Louisa Butler-Know
- 1987 The Dead - Aunt Julia
- 1988 Brigit
- 1988 Troubles (TV) - Miss Rice
- 1989 Ticket to Ride (TV) - Mrs. Durkin
- 1990 The Love She Sought (TV film) - Mrs. Curry, the Bishop's Housekeeper
- 1990 The Real Charlotte (TV) - Mrs. Gascoine
- 1991 The Miracle -Miss Strange
- 1991 December Bride -Agnes the Midwife
- 1993 The Snapper (TV) - Oul'one
- 1993 Lovejoy (TV) - Old Lady
- 1995 Jake's Progress (TV) - Helen

=== Stage ===
- A Bride for the Unicorn
- Abdication
- Anything But the Truth
- Ascendancy
- Asmodée
- Bitter Rue
- Cadenza in Black
- Hamilton and Jones
- Here's Your Uncle George!
- John Donne
- Le Bourgeois Gentilhomme
- Lord Edward
- Lovers : Losers
- Patrick Sarsfield
- Pride and Prejudice
- Sea Change
- She Sits Smiling
- Sister Eucharia
- Tartufe
- The Absentee
- The Avenger
- The Barber of Seville
- The Earl of Straw
- The New Girl
- The Strange Lover
- The Uncrowned King
- The United Brothers
- Three Leopards
- Yahoo
