= Gabriel Iranyi =

Israeli composer

Gabriel Iranyi גבריאל אירני
- Born: June 6, 1946 (age 79); Cluj, Kingdom of Romania
- Occupation: Composer

Gabriel Iranyi (Hebrew: גבריאל אירני; born 6 June 1946) is a Romanian-born Israeli composer.

== Biography ==
Gabriel Iranyi was born in Cluj, Rumania. He immigrated to Israel at the age of 30.
