= Truth in Accounting =

American thinktank

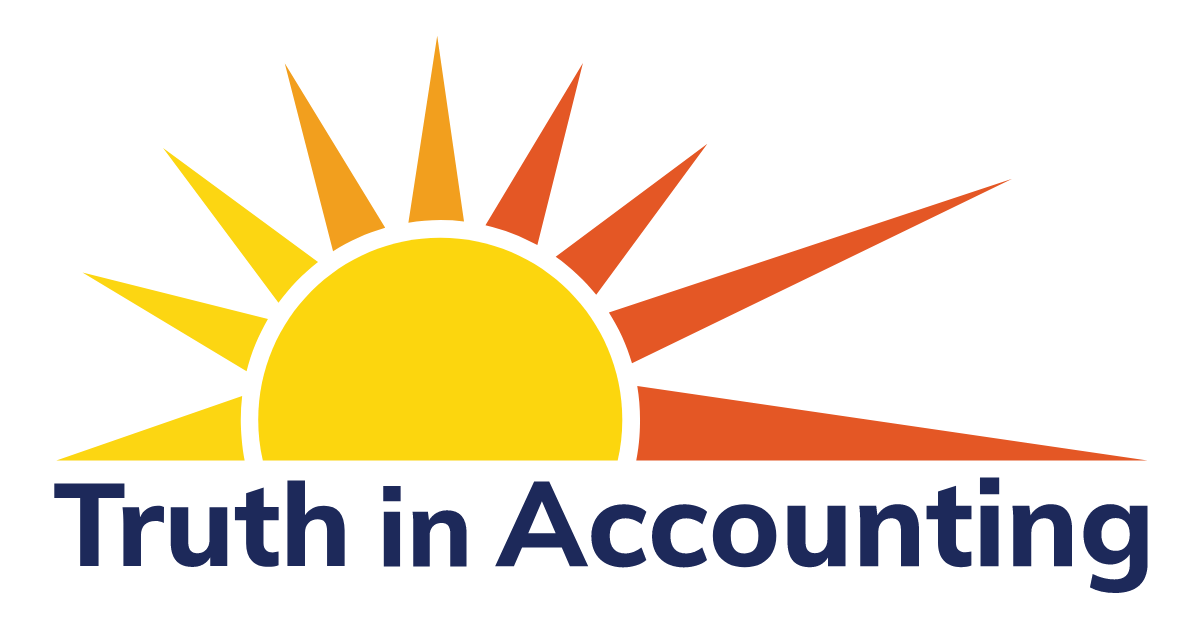
- Founded: 2002
- Founder: Sheila A. Weinberg
- Type: 501(c)(3)
- Purpose: United States public debt
- Location(s): 118 N. Clinton St. Chicago, Illinois 60661
- Coordinates: 41.8838°N 87.6417°W
- Revenue: $380,187 (2013)
- Employees: 10
- Website: truthinaccounting.org

Truth in Accounting (TIA), formerly known as the Institute for Truth in Accounting, is a right-leaning American think tank that promotes fiscal transparency and accountability. Its stated goal is "to educate and empower citizens with understandable, reliable, and transparent government financial information."

== Publications ==
Each September, TIA releases its "Financial State of States" report that takes a deep look into each of the 50 states' Comprehensive Annual Financial Report (CAFR) in order to compare assets with liabilities. "For the first time, a detailed analysis of pension and health care liabilities has exposed all fifty states’ actual obligations," commented Ziyi Mai in The John Locke Foundation's blog, The Locker Room. TIA then ranks the 50 states on the basis of taxpayer burden, which is each taxpayer's share of state debt.

TIA expanded on its state-level analysis in 2015, moving its analysis to include city-level governments. TIA now analyzes and ranks the 75 largest US cities, all 50 states and the Federal government

== Reception ==
Kevin Palmer at Watchdog Wire reported on TIA's methodology: "Truth In Accounting’s figure includes not only this public debt, but also intergovernmental debts (loans made from one government branch or agency to another) and unfunded liabilities, the greatest of which are Social Security, Medicare, and pensions. As the population ages, these unfunded liabilities have skyrocketed–and although they aren’t yet part of our official debt, barring substantial reform the government will have no choice but to borrow trillions in order to fulfill them."

In 2014 Politifact analyzed a TIA report claiming that taxpayers in Georgia would have to send $5,000 each to the state treasury to cover the debt and concluded that it was "mostly false".

In 2019 Colorado Politics described TIA as a "a think tank tied to the American Legislative Exchange Council (ALEC) and the right-wing State Policy Network."

== Data-Z ==
In November 2012, Truth in Accounting launched a new website called Data-Z, which provides easy access to its calculations of the federal government, the 50 states' and the nations 75 largest city's debt, liabilities, and assets and permits users to graph and analyze it visually. The website has over 700 data points collected from the all levels of government. This website is free for anyone to use with basic graph functions. There is a paid subscription available with broader capabilities. TIA partners with anyone who wants data straight from the government sources.

== See also ==
- American Legislative Exchange Council
- Tax Foundation
- State Policy Network
- Heartland Institute
