= Hazel Doupe =

Irish actress

- Born: Dublin, Ireland
- Occupation: Actress
- Years active: 2013–present

Hazel Doupe is an Irish actress. She made her breakthrough in the coming-of-age film Float Like a Butterfly (2018). Her films since include You Are Not My Mother (2021). On television, she is known for her role in the FX series Say Nothing (2024).

== Life and work ==
Doupe was born in Dublin. She started her career as a guest star in the episode "Shot Down" of the second series of the TV3 drama series Jack Taylor. In 2015, Doupe starred as Wendy Darling/Lucy Rose in the modern day television adaption of Peter Pan, which was broadcast on 26 December 2015 on ITV. In 2017, she starred in Michael Inside.

She is best known for her role as Frances, an Irish Traveller teen who idolises boxing legend Muhammad Ali and trains herself to become a boxer in the 2018 film Float Like a Butterfly, which premiered at the 2018 Toronto International Film Festival. On portraying her character in the film, Doupe explained that "The main concern of mine was, it wasn't solely to be amazing in this performance, it wasn't to be good, it was to be true to the character, to present her in a realistic way, my priority was to portray her as a real hero and it's so different to the heroes we see on screen."

In 2021, Doupe portrayed Ingrid in the RTÉ One thriller drama series Smother, which also starred Dervla Kirwan, Niamh Walsh, Seána Kerslake and Gemma-Leah Devereux. In an interview with Entertainment.ie, regards of her casting in the series, Doupe stated:

It was very apparent in the script that Ingrid was really mature and self-assured for her age - she's only 16. To me, she had a lot more life experience than a 16-year-old character in any other script that I had seen would have.

Doupe starred in You Are Not My Mother and The Ulysses Project.

She is the voice of Melinda in the Adult Swim series Unicorn: Warriors Eternal.

== Filmography ==
=== Film ===
Year	Title	Role	Notes
2014	Davin	Sonia	Short
2016	Property of the State	Young Anne Marie	
2017	Michael Inside	Orla Kerr	
2018	Float Like a Butterfly	Frances	
2019	Calm with Horses	Charlie	
2020	Kathleen Was Here	Kathleen	short film
2021	The Green Sea	Kid	
2021	You Are Not My Mother	Charlotte "Char" Delaney	
2022	The Ulysses Project	The Nymph/The Cat/Cissy Caffrey	
2023	The Miracle Club	Cathy Dunne	
2024	Kathleen Is Here	Kathleen	feature length follow-up to Kathleen Was Here

=== Television ===
Year	Title	Role	Notes
2013	Jack Taylor	Róisín Mangan	Episode: "Shot Down"
2013	Ripper Street	Flower Girl	Episode: "A Stronger Loving World"
2015	Peter and Wendy	Wendy Darling/Lucy Rose	Television film
2017	Into the Badlands	Artemis	Episode: "Black Heart, White Mountain"
2021	Smother	Ingrid	Regular
2023	Unicorn: Warriors Eternal	Melinda (voice)	Main
2024	Sanctuary: A Witch's Tale	Harper Fenn	Main
2024	Say Nothing	Marian Price	Main
