= Kieran Hickey =

Irish film director and producer

- Born: 29 February 1936
- Died: 13 July 1993 (aged 57)
- Education: University of London
- Occupation(s): Film director, producer

Kieran Hickey (29 February 1936 – 13 July 1993) was an Irish film producer and director.

== Life ==
Kieran Hickey was born in Dublin in 1936. He moved to London in the late 1950s, where he enrolled in the London School of Film Technique, Brixton. He became a close friend of David Thomson, the British film-writer. He moved back to Dublin in the early 1960s, establishing BAC Films, Ltd. Hickey is known for his documentaries and modern Irish fictional dramas. Due to budget limitations, none of his films were full-length features. Hickey died on 13 July 1993. Thomson stated after his death that for him "the movies are over now that he's gone".
