= Kate Thompson (romantic novelist) =

Kate Thompson (born 17 November 1959) is an actress and romantic novelist who also writes as Pixie Pirelli (the writer heroine of Sex, Lies and Fairytales).

== Biography ==
She was born in Belfast, Northern Ireland, and studied English and French at Trinity College Dublin.

She spent many years as an actress in theatre and television, most notably in the Irish drama serial Glenroe. She married the actor Malcolm Douglas in 1985 and has a daughter Clara (born 1987). In 1989 she won the Best Actress Award in the Dublin Theatre Festival. Her first novel, It Means Mischief, was published in 1998. The Blue Hour was shortlisted for the Parker Romantic Novel of the Year.

Her light-hearted novels feature characters involved in the arts and business, living between the South of France and Connemara, whose romances and lives have grown in the Celtic Tiger years and the successive austerity.

== Works ==
- It Means Mischief (1998)
- More Mischief (2000)
- Going Down (2001)
- The Blue Hour (2002)
- Striking Poses (2003)
- A Perfect Life (2004)
- Living the Dream (2004)
- Sex, Lies and Fairytales (2005)
- Hard to Choos (2006) (as Pixie Pirelli)
- Love Lies Bleeding (2007)
- Star Gazing (2008)
- The Kinsella Sisters (2009)
- O'hara Affair (2010)
- That Gallagher Girl (2011)
