= The Diary of Anne Frank (opera) =

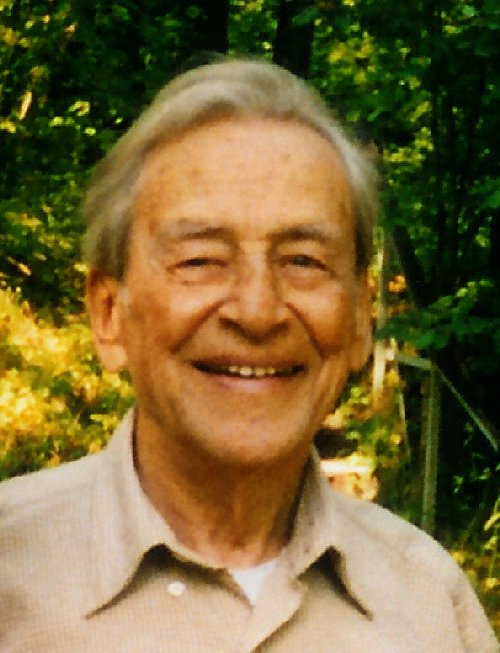
Grigory Frid at the "House of Composers" in Ruza, 2004

The Diary of Anne Frank («Дневник Анны Франк» Dnevnik Anny Frank) is a monodrama in 21 scenes for soprano and chamber orchestra, composed in 1968 and first performed in 1972. The music and libretto are by Grigory Frid, after the eponymous 1942–1944 diary.

== Plot ==
The 13-year-old Anne Frank is hiding with her family in a house in Amsterdam from July 1942 until their arrest in August 1944. She describes the people she sees, her different moods, and her emotions in her diary, telling of her pleasure at a birthday gift, or the sight of blue sky from her window, or her awakening attraction for Peter, but also her fear and loneliness.

== Description ==
Frid wrote his own libretto for the work, structuring the original texts to provide a rich and varied portrait of Anne and the people around her in 21 brief scenes. The opera lasts one hour.

== Scenes ==
1. Prelude
2. Birthday
3. School
4. Conversation with Father
5. Summons to the Gestapo
6. The Hiding Place / The Bell Tower West
7. At the Little Window
8. I Was Told
9. Despair
10. Memory
11. Dream
12. Interlude
13. Duet of Mr and Mrs Van Daan
14. Thieves
15. Recitative
16. I Think of Peter
17. On the Russian Front
18. Razzia
19. Loneliness
20. Passacaglia
21. Finale

The opera, composed in 1968, was first performed with piano accompaniment at the All-Union House of Composers in Moscow on either 17 or 18 May 1972.

== Reception ==
The opera's intimate nature and chamber orchestra scale means that it works well in small spaces and using small forces. In summer 2012, Operabase listed it as the most frequently staged lyric work by a living composer over the previous five years.

Opera Performances: American-Armenian Soprano Ani Maldjian performed the title role in the US Premiere. Other premieres performed by her include Ireland, France and Belgium.

== Discography ==
- Das Tagebuch der Anne Frank (sung in German) Sandra Schwarzhaupt, soprano, Emsland Ensemble, Hans Erik Deckert, Profil PH04044,
- The Diary of Anne Frank (sung in Russian) Eva Ben-Tsvi soprano, Bolshoi Theatre Orchestra, Andrey Chistiakov, reissued Brilliant Classics
- Das Tagebuch der Anne Frank (sung in German) Nina Maria Plangg, soprano, Jury Everhartz, conductor, sirene Operntheater, Storm Cinema
