= Grigory Frid =

Russian composer

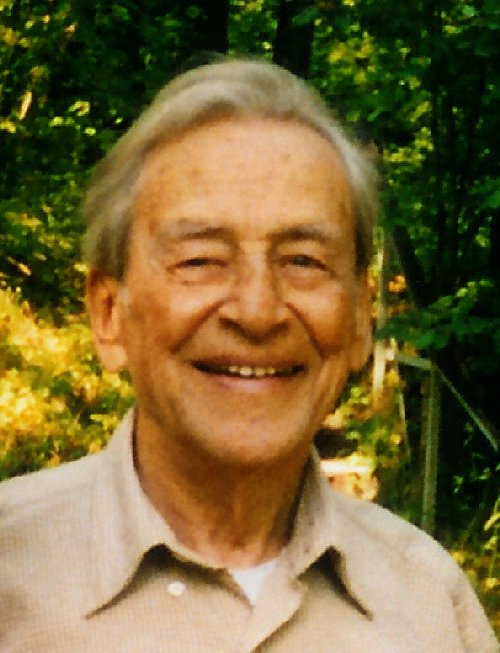
Grigory Frid at the "House of Composers" in Ruza, 2004

Grigory Samuilovich Frid, also known as Grigori Fried (Russian: Григо́рий Самуи́лович Фри́д, 22 September ^{N.S.} 1915 – 22 September 2012), was a Russian composer of music written in many different genres, including chamber opera.

== Early life and education ==
Born in Petrograd, now St. Petersburg, Frid studied in the Moscow Conservatory with Heinrich Litinsky and Vissarion Shebalin. He was a soldier in the Second World War.

== Career ==
Frid was a prolific composer. His most notable works are his two chamber operas, both to his own libretti. The Diary of Anne Frank is a monodrama in 21 scenes for soprano and chamber orchestra, lasting about one hour. It was composed in 1968 and given a first performance with piano accompaniment at the All-Union House of Composers in Moscow on either 17 or 18 May 1972. The Letters of Van Gogh is a mono-opera in two parts for baritone and chamber ensemble, based on the letters of Vincent Van Gogh to his brother Theo. The opera was composed in 1975 and given its premiere in concert form at the same venue, on 29 November 1976.

He wrote three symphonies (1939, 1955, 1964), a series of instrumental concertos including a Concerto for viola, piano and string orchestra (1981), music for theatre and cinema including stage music for Phèdre by Jean Racine (1985), vocal and chamber music including a cycle Poetry (1973) for voice and chamber ensemble to poems by Federico García Lorca, a Piano Quintet (1981), a Fantasia for cello and piano (1982), Fedra (Phèdre, 1985) - a piano quintet with solo viola, and Five Songs to poems by Luís de Camões (1985).

The style of Frid's early music may be explained as conventional, written in the tradition of so-called "Socialist realism". At the age of 55 he changed his style radically, turning to the twelve-tone and other more contemporary techniques of music composition. Frid was known as having been a music propagandist and organiser of a series of lectures-concerts for young people at the "Moscow House of Composers" that were popular in the 1970s. He was also a visual artist, having had a series of exhibitions of his paintings. Frid authored a few volumes of recollections, two of which first were published in Moscow in 1987 and 1991.

In 1986 Grigory Frid received the title of Honoured Art Worker.

== Selected works ==
Stage

- The Diary of Anne Frank (Дневник Анны Франк), Monologue-Opera in 2 acts for soprano and chamber orchestra, Op. 60 (1969); version II (1999) for soprano and chamber ensemble; libretto by the composer
- Van Gogh's Letters (Письма Ван-Гога), Monologue-Opera in 2 acts for baritone and chamber ensemble, Op. 69 (1975); libretto by the composer based on letters from Vincent van Gogh to his brother Theo

Orchestral

- Overture No. 1 (1936)
- Symphony No. 1 (1939)
- Piece (Пьеса) (1939)
- Northern Lights (Северное сияние), Suite (1946)
- 3 Marches (Три марша) (1947)
- Nature's Calendar (Календарь природы) after Mikhail Prishvin (1947); also a version for violin and piano
- Overture No. 2 (1950)
- All Year Round (Круглый год) after Samuil Marshak (1951); also for piano
- Sinfonietta (Симфониетта) (1951)
- Merry Suite (Веселая сюита) (1954)
- Symphony No. 2 "Lyric" (Лирическая) (1955)
- Rhapsody on Slovak and Moravian Themes (Рапсодия на словацкие и моравские темы) (1956)
- Festive Overture (Праздничная увертюра) (1957)
- On the Shores of Cheptsa (На берегах Чепцы), Poem in Memory of Vladimir Korolenko (1959)
- Заре навстречу (1960)
- Overture No. 3 (1961)
- 2 Inventions (Две инвенции) for string orchestra, Op. 46a (1962); original for piano
- Symphony No. 3 for string orchestra and timpani, Op. 50 (1964)
- Overture, Op. 56 (1967)

Concertante

- Fantasia Concertante (Концертная фантазия) for violin and orchestra (1955)
- Concerto for viola and chamber orchestra, Op. 52 (1967)
- Concerto for trombone and orchestra (1968)
- Concerto for viola, piano and string orchestra, Op. 73 (1981)
- Romance (Романс) for cello, piano and chamber ensemble (1981); also for solo cello, 4 cellos and piano; music from the film Lenin in Paris

Chamber music

- Prelude and Fugue (Прелюдия и фуга) for string quartet (1940)
- String Quartet No. 1 (1936)
- Sonata No. 1 for violin and piano (1946)
- String Quartet No. 2 (1947)
- Nature's Calendar (Календарь природы), Cycle of 10 pieces after Mikhail Prishvin for violin and piano (1947, 1948) (1947); original for orchestra
- Sonatina for oboe and piano (1949)
- String Quartet No. 3 (1949)
- Sonata No. 1 for cello and piano (1951)
- Aria (Ария) for cello and piano (1952)
- Sonatina for flute and piano (1952)
- Sonata No. 2 for cello and piano (1957)
- String Quartet No. 4 (1958)
- Aria and Intermezzo (Ария и интермеццо) for cello and piano (1962)
- Concert Fantasy on Themes of Three Folk Songs of Western Ukraine (Концертная фантазия на темы трех песен народов Западной Украины) for trumpet and piano (1963)
- 8 Pieces (Восемь пьес) for cello and piano (1963)
- Romance (Романс) for flute and piano (1963)
- Sonata No. 2 for violin and piano (1964)
- Sonata No. 1 for clarinet and piano (1966)
- Sonata No. 3 for violin and piano (1968)
- Divertimento (Дивертисмент) for violin and piano (1969)
- Sonata for oboe and piano (1971)
- Sonata No. 2 for clarinet and piano (1971)
- Sonata for viola and piano, Op. 62 No. 1 (1971)
- 6 Pieces (Шесть пьес) for string quartet, Op. 64 (1972)
- Sonata for 3 clarinets (1974)
- String Quartet No. 5 (1977)
- Piano Quintet, Op. 72 (1981)
- Romance (Романс) for solo cello, 4 cellos and piano (1981); also for cello, piano and chamber ensemble; music from the film Lenin in Paris
- Fantasia (Фантазия) for cello and piano (1982)
- Sonata No. 3 for clarinet and piano (1982)
- Phèdre (Федра; Phaedra) for viola solo, 2 violins, cello and piano, Op. 78 (1985)
- Sonata No. 2 for viola and piano (1985); second version of Phèdre

Piano

- Toccata (Токката) (1935)
- Variations (Вариации) (1937)
- All Year Round (Круглый год), 12 Pieces after Samuil Marshak (1951); also for orchestra
- Children's Album (Детский альбом) (1961)
- Inventions (Инвенции), Op. 46 (1962); also for orchestra
- Hungarian Album (Венгерский альбом), 14 Pieces (1966)
- Sonatina (1971)
- Sonata No. 1 (1973)
- Sonata No. 2 (1974)
- Sonata for 2 pianos (1985)
- A Day in the Country
- Youthful Adventures
- Russian Tales

Vocal

- 6 Songs for voice and piano (1949); words by Alexander Pushkin
- 7 Songs on Words of Armenian Poets (Семь романсов на cлова армянских поэтов) (1949)
- 5 Sonnets by William Shakespeare (Пять сонетов У. Шекспира) for voice and piano (1959)
- 4 Songs for voice and piano (1961); words by Samuil Marshak
- Prison Diary (Тюремный дневник), Song Cycle for voice and piano (1962); words by Ho Chi Minh
- Before the Storm (Перед бурей), Song Cycle for voice and piano (1958)
- Poetry (Поэзия), Cycle for 2 voices, clarinet, cello, piano and percussion (1973); words by Federico García Lorca
- 5 Songs for voice and piano (1985); words from Winter (Зима) by Luís de Camões

Choral

- Rainbow (Радуга), Cycle for chorus and chamber orchestra (1963); words by Samuil Zalmanovich Galkin

Film scores

- Smoke in the Forest (Дым в лесу) (1955); directed by Yevgeny Karelov and Yuri Chylyukin
- Circus Festival, documentary film (1958)
- Timur and His Command, also Timur and His Team (Тимур и его команда) (1976); directed by Alexander Blank and Sergei Linkov
- Marshal revolyutsii (Маршал революции) (1978); directed by Sergei Linkov
- Krik gagary (Крик гагары) (1980); directed by Sergei Linkov
- Lenin in Paris (1981); directed by Sergei Yutkevich
- Bereg yevo zhizni (Берег его жизни) (1984); directed by Yury Solomin
- The Best Years (Лучшие годы) (1994); directed by Sergei Linkov

== Discography ==
- The Diary of Anne Frank (Das Tagebuch Der Anne Frank), Monologue-Opera; World Premiere Recording; Sandra Schwarzhaupt (soprano); Hans Erik Deckert (director); Emsland Ensemble; Profil PH04044

== Bibliography ==
- Фрид, Григорий: Музыка. Общение. Судьбы: О Московском молодежном музыкальном клубе: Статьи и очерки; Автор предисловия И. Нестьев 237, с. ил. 22 см, М. Сов. композитор 1987
- Фрид, Григорий: Музыка! Музыка? Музыка... и молодежь, 213, с. ил., нот. ил. 26 см, М. Советский композитор 1991
