= List of Irish actors =

This list of notable actors from the Republic of Ireland includes performers in theatre, film, television and radio.

== Born in the 17th and 18th centuries ==
- Michael Atkins (1747–1812) ( English–born)
- Spranger Barry (1719–1777)
- George Anne Bellamy (1731–1788)
- Maria Ann Campion (1777–1803)
- Richard Daly (1758–1813)
- Thomas Doggett (1640–1721)
- Elizabeth Rebecca Edwin (1771–1854)
- Anna Marcella Giffard (1707–1777)
- Charles Macklin (1699–1797)
- James Middleton (1769–1799)
- John O'Keeffe (1747–1833)
- Elizabeth O'Neill (1791–1872)
- Tyrone Power (1797–1841)
- Thomas Sheridan (1719–1788)
- John Sowdon (died 1789)
- Isaac Sparks (1719–1776)
- Luke Sparks (1711–1768)
- Montague Talbot (1774–1831)
- Robert Wilks (1665–1732) (Irish–born)
- Mary Woffington (1729–1811)
- Peg Woffington (1720–1760)

== Born 1800–1849 ==
- Dion Boucicault (1820–1890)
- John Brougham (1810–1880)
- Ada Dyas (1843–1908)

== Born 1850–1899 ==
- Sara Allgood (1879–1950)
- W. Graham Browne (1870–1937)
- Mary Charleson (1890–1961)
- Patricia Collinge (1892–1974) (Irish-American)
- D'Arcy Corrigan (1870–1945)
- May Craig 1889–1972)
- Eileen Crowe (1899–1978)
- Maureen Delany (1888–1961)
- Michael J. Dolan (1884–1954)
- Paul Farrell (1893–1975)
- Al Ferguson (1888–1971) (Irish-American)
- Barry Fitzgerald (1888–1961)
- Neil Fitzgerald (1893–1982)
- Charles K. Gerrard (1883–1969) (Irish-American)
- Douglas Gerrard (1891–1950) (Irish-American)
- Creighton Hale (1882–1965) (Irish-American)
- Forrester Harvey (1884–1945)
- Gladys Henson (1897–1982)
- J. M. Kerrigan (1884–1964)
- F. J. McCormick (1899–1978)
- Kitty McShane (1897–1964)
- Matt Moore (1890–1947) (Irish-American)
- Una O'Connor (1880–1959)
- Brefni O'Rorke (1889–1946)
- Anita Sharp-Bolster (1895-1985)
- Albert Sharpe (1885–1970)
- Arthur Shields (1896–1970)

== Born in the 1900s ==
- Max Adrian (1903–1973)
- George Brent (1904–1979)
- Harry Brogan (1904–1977)
- Chris Curran (1908–1996)
- Cathleen Delany (1907–1977)
- J. G. Devlin (1907–1991)
- Hilton Edwards (1903–1982) (born in London)
- Joan Henley (1904–1986)
- Ria Mooney (1903–1973)
- Frank O'Donovan (1900–1974)
- Noel Purcell (1900-1985)
- Shelah Richards (1903–1985)
- Eve Watkinson (1909–1999)

== Born in the 1910s ==
- Eddie Byrne (1911–1981)
- Cyril Cusack (1910–1993) (born in South Africa; Irish-English)
- Eithne Dunne (1919–1988)
- Geraldine Fitzgerald (1913–2005)
- Marie Kean (1918–1993)
- Dermot Kelly (1918–1980)
- Jack MacGowran (1918–1973)
- Patrick McAlinney (1913–1990)
- Dan O'Herlihy (1919–2005) (naturalised American citizen)
- Nora O'Mahoney (1912–1989)
- Arthur O'Sullivan (1912–1981)
- Maureen O'Sullivan (1911–1998) (naturalised American citizen)
- Micheline Patton (1912–2001)
- Liam Redmond (1913–1989)
- Maxwell Reed (1919–1974)
- Cecil Sheridan (1910–1980)
- John Welsh (1914–1985)
- Noel Willman (1918–1988)

== Born in the 1920s ==
- Robert Carrickford (1928–2016)
- Barry Cassin (1924–2017)
- Brendan Cauldwell (1924–2006)
- May Cluskey (1927–1991)
- John Cowley (1923–1998)
- Peggy Cummins (1925–2017) (born in Wales)
- Maureen Cusack (1920–1977)
- Pauline Delaney (1925–2007)
- Patricia Driscoll (1927–2020) (British-Irish)
- Charles B. Fitzsimons (1921–2001)
- David Kelly (1929–2012)
- Doreen Keogh (1924–2017)
- Peadar Lamb (1929-2017)
- Eugene Lambert (1928–2010)
- Angela Lansbury (1925–2022) (Held triple US, British, & Irish citizenship)
- Richard Leech (1922–2004)
- Joe Lynch (1925–2001)
- Oliver MacGreevy (1928–1981)
- Tomás Mac Anna (1926–2011)
- Patrick Magee (1922–1982)
- Anna Manahan (1924–2009)
- Sheila Manahan (1924–1988)
- Ronnie Masterson (1926-2014)
- Ray McAnally (1926–1989)
- Sean McClory (1924–2003)
- Patrick McGoohan (1928–2009) (born in New York)
- Siobhán McKenna (1923–1986)
- T. P. McKenna (1929–2011)
- Fintan Meyler (1929–2005)
- Noelle Middleton (1926–2016)
- Charles Mitchel (1920–1996)
- John Molloy (1929-1999)
- Kieron Moore (1924–2007)
- Edward Mulhare (1923–1997)
- Neasa Ní Annracháin (1922–2014)
- Bernadette O'Farrell (1924–1999)
- James O'Hara (1927–1992)
- Maureen O'Hara (1920–2015)
- Milo O'Shea (1926–2013)
- Maureen Potter (1925–2004)
- Godfrey Quigley (1923–1994)
- Norman Rodway (1929–2001)
- Ann Rowan (1929–2014)
- Kathleen Ryan (1922–1985)
- Phyllis Ryan (1920–2011)
- Niall Tóibín (1929–2019)
- Constance Smith (1929–2003)
- Dermot Walsh (1924–2002)

== Born in the 1930s ==
- Stephen Boyd (1931–1977)
- Audrey Dalton (born 1934)
- Donal Donnelly (1931–2010)
- Brenda Doyle (1933–1981)
- Tony Doyle (1935–2000)
- Redmond Gleeson (1935–2020)
- Maurice Good (1932–2013)
- Richard Harris (1930–2003)
- Tom Jordan (1937-2019)
- Frank Kelly (1938–2016)
- Des Keogh (born 1935)
- Pat Laffan (1939–2019)
- Rosaleen Linehan (born 1937)
- Tomás Mac Eoin (born 1937)
- Joseph Maher (1933–1988)

(naturalised American citizen)

- Malachy McCourt (1931-2024)
- Declan Mulholland (1932–1999)
- Jim Norton (born 1938)
- Seán Ó Coisdealbha (1930–2006)
- Patrick O'Connell (1934–2017)
- Joan O'Hara (1930–2007)
- Máirín O'Donovan (born 1936)
- Tom Sailí Ó Flaithearta (1931–2021)
- Aideen O'Kelly (1936–2015)
- Peter O'Toole (1932–2013)
- Derry Power (1935–2025)
- Birdy Sweeney (1931-1999)
- Maureen Toal (1930–2012)

== Born in the 1940s ==
- Jim Bartley (born 1945)
- Seán Bán Breathnach (born 1949)
- Sean Caffrey (1940–2013)
- Dermot Crowley (born 1947)
- Jeananne Crowley (born 1949)
- Sinéad Cusack (born 1948)
- Sorcha Cusack (born 1949)
- Tony Doyle (1942–2000)
- Fionnula Flanagan (born 1941)
- Scott Fredericks (1943–2017)
- Brenda Fricker (born 1945)
- BP Fallon (born 1946)
- Michael Gambon (1940–2023) (Irish-English)
- Gillian Hanna (1944–2019)
- Bosco Hogan (born 1949)
- John Kavanagh (born 1946)
- Mick Lally (1945–2010)
- Caitlín Maude (1941–1982)
- Donal McCann (1943–1999)
- Ian McElhinney (born 1948)
- Barry McGovern (born 1948)
- Dearbhla Molloy (born 1946)
- Eamon Morrissey (born 1943)
- Bryan Murray (born 1949)
- Sam Neill (1947–2026) (Irish–New Zealander)
- Niall O'Brien (1946–2009)
- Joe Pilkington (1940–1999)
- Stephen Rea (born 1946)
- Anita Reeves (1948–2016)
- Frances Tomelty (born 1948)
- Biddy White Lennon (1946–2017)

== Born in the 1950s ==
- Patrick Bergin (born 1951)
- Bríd Brennan (born 1955)
- Páraic Breathnach (born 1956)
- Pierce Brosnan (born 1953)
- Gabriel Byrne (born 1950)
- Tony Clarkin (born 1952)
- Lorcan Cranitch (born 1959)
- Gemma Craven (born 1950)
- Niamh Cusack (born 1959)
- Deirdre Donnelly (born 1950)
- Olwen Fouéré (born 1954)
- Brendan Gleeson (born 1955)
- Brendan Grace (1951–2019)
- Nuala Holloway (born 1956)
- Ben Keaton (1956–2026)
- Finbar Lynch (born 1959)
- Francis Magee (born 1959)
- Maria McDermottroe (born 1952)
- Seán McGinley (born 1956)
- Colm Meaney (born 1953)
- Dermot Morgan (1952–1998)
- Marie Mullen (born 1953)
- Liam Neeson (born 1952)
- Bríd Ní Neachtain (born 1959)
- Brendan O'Carroll (born 1955)
- Eilish O'Carroll (born 1952)
- Maurice O'Donoghue (born 1950)
- Rynagh O'Grady (1954–2021)
- Daragh O'Malley (born 1954)
- Fiona Shaw (born 1958)
- Fiona Victory (born 1952)
- Ciarán Hinds (born 1953)

== Born in the 1960s ==
- Angeline Ball (born 1969)
- Orla Brady (born 1961)
- Kenneth Branagh (born 1960) (British citizen)
- Jane Brennan (born 1960)
- Todd Carty (born 1963) (born in London)
- Carrie Crowley (born 1964)
- Liam Cunningham (born 1961)
- Ned Dennehy (born 1965)
- Alison Doody (born 1966)
- Maria Doyle Kennedy (born 1964)
- Ian Fitzgibbon (born 1962)
- Jennifer Gibney (born 1964)
- Aidan Gillen (born 1968)
- Tony Guilfoyle (born 1960)
- Conleth Hill (born 1964)
- Tina Kellegher (born 1967)
- John Lynch (born 1961)
- Michael McElhatton (born 1963)
- Barry McEvoy (born 1967)
- Pauline McLynn (born 1962)
- Tom Murphy (1968–2007)
- Graham Norton (born 1963)
- Brían F. O'Byrne (born 1967)
- Ardal O'Hanlon (born 1965)
- Deirdre O'Kane (born 1968)
- Colm Ó Maonlaí (born 1966)
- Aisling O'Sullivan (born 1968)
- Gabrielle Reidy (1960–2014)
- Paul Ronan (born 1965)
- Pat Shortt (born 1967)
- Ray Stevenson (1964-2023)
- Tommy Tiernan (born 1969)
- Stanley Townsend (born 1961)
- Don Wycherley (born 1967)

== Born in the 1970s ==
- Leigh Arnold (born 1979)
- Caitríona Balfe (born 1979)
- Cathy Belton (born 1970)
- Eva Birthistle (born 1974)
- Elaine Cassidy (born 1979)
- Andrea Corr (born 1974)
- Pádraic Delaney (born 1977)
- Simon Delaney (born 1970)
- Lisa Dwan (born 1977)
- Colin Farrell (born 1976)
- Michael Fassbender (born 1977) (born in Germany)
- Hilda Fay (born 1973)
- Orla Fitzgerald (born 1978)
- Jonathan Forbes (born 1976)
- Bronagh Gallagher (born 1972)
- Sharon Horgan (born 1970)
- Amy Huberman (born 1979)
- Sinéad Keenan (born 1977)
- Simone Kirby (born 1976)
- Dervla Kirwan (born 1971)
- Edward MacLiam (born 1976)
- Aidan McArdle (born 1970)
- Peter McDonald (born 1972)
- Owen McDonnell (born 1974)
- Keith McErlean (born 1975)
- Aoife McMahon (born 1973)
- Siobhán McSweeney (born 1979)
- Jonathan Rhys Meyers (born 1977)
- Dylan Moran (born 1971)
- Cillian Murphy (born 1976)
- Tadhg Murphy (born 1979)
- David Murray (born 1970)
- Hugh O'Conor (born 1975)
- Chris O'Dowd (born 1979)
- Jason O'Mara (born 1972)
- Lochlann Ó Mearáin (born 1973)
- Genevieve O'Reilly (born 1977) (Irish-Australian)
- Lorraine Pilkington (born 1974)
- Rachel Pilkington (born 1974)
- Glenn Quinn (1970–2002)
- Rachel Rath (born 1976)
- Hilary Rose (born 1979)
- Emmett J. Scanlan (born 1979)
- Andrew Scott (born 1976)
- Alex Sharpe (born 1971)
- Victoria Smurfit (born 1974)
- Stuart Townsend (born 1972)
- Tom Vaughan-Lawlor (born 1977)
- Catherine Walker (born 1975)
- Richard Wall (born 1977)
- Eileen Walsh (born 1977)

== Born in the 1980s ==
- Yasmine Akram (born 1982) (born in the United Arab Emirates; Irish-Pakistani)
- Ian Lloyd Anderson (born 1986)
- Jonas Armstrong (born 1981)
- Aisling Bea (born 1984)
- Ruth Bradley (born 1987)
- Jessie Buckley (born 1989)
- Kerry Condon (born 1983)
- Peter Coonan (born 1984)
- Peter Campion (born 1987/1988)
- Nicola Coughlan (born 1987)
- Jamie Dornan (born 1982)
- Clare Dunne (born 1988)
- Moe Dunford (born 1987)
- Rory Fleck Byrne (born 1988/1989)
- Fiona Glascott (born 1982)
- Brian Gleeson (born 1987)
- Domhnall Gleeson (born 1983)
- Denise Gough (born 1980)
- Kelly Gough (born 1987)
- Sarah Greene (born 1984)
- Amy-Joyce Hastings (born 1980)
- Kojii Helnwein (born 1981)
- Siobhan Hewlett (born 1983) (born in London)
- Jade Jordan (born 1988)
- Ruth Kearney (born 1984)
- Rory Keenan (born 1980)
- Joanne King (born 1983)
- Allen Leech (born 1981)
- Susan Loughnane (born 1987)
- Conor MacNeill (born 1988)
- Eoin Macken (born 1983)
- Dominique McElligott (born 1986)
- Jane McGrath (born 1988)
- Katie McGrath (born 1983)
- Charlene McKenna (born 1984)
- Stephanie McKeon (born 1987)
- Susan McFadden (born 1983)
- Damien Molony (born 1984)
- Colin Morgan (born 1986)
- Deirdre Mullins (born 1982)
- Samantha Mumba (born 1983)
- Charlie Murphy (born 1988)
- Devon Murray (born 1988)
- Ruth Negga (born 1982) (born in Ethiopia)
- Nora-Jane Noone (born 1984)
- Diarmuid Noyes (born 1988)
- Aidan O'Callaghan (born 1988)
- Danny O'Carroll (born 1983)
- Fiona O'Carroll (born 1980)
- Valerie O'Connor (born 1981/1982)
- Colin O'Donoghue (born 1981)
- Dónall Ó Héalai (born 1987)
- Orla O'Rourke (born in Zambia)
- Danielle Ryan (born 1983)
- Killian Scott (born 1985)
- Robert Sheehan (born 1988)
- Aidan Turner (born 1983)
- Jos Vantyler (born 1988)
- Niamh Walsh (born 1988)

== Born in the 1990s ==
- Niamh Algar (born 1992)
- Sarah Bolger (born 1991)
- Lauryn Canny (born 1998)
- Siobhán Cullen (born 1990)
- Gemma-Leah Devereux (born 1990)
- Gavin Drea (born 1990)
- Dónal Finn (born 1995)
- Aisling Franciosi (born 1993)
- Danielle Galligan (born 1992)
- Patrick Gibson (born 1995) (born in London)
- Jack Gleeson (born 1992)
- Louisa Harland (born 1994)
- Aaron Heffernan (born 1990)
- Eve Hewson (born 1991)
- Ella Lily Hyland (born 1998)
- Sam Keeley (born 1990)
- Barry Keoghan (born 1992)
- Seána Kerslake (born 1992)
- Tara Lee (born 1994)
- Clinton Liberty (born 1998)
- Evanna Lynch (born 1991)
- Patrick Martins (born 1997) (born in Lagos, Nigeria)
- Daryl McCormack (born 1993)
- Mark McKenna (born 1996)
- Paul Mescal (born 1996)
- India Mullen (born 1993)
- Alex Murphy (born 1997)
- Clíona Ní Chiosáin (born 1990)
- Ruairi O'Connor (born 1991)
- Laurence O'Fuarain (born 1990)
- Alison Oliver (born 1997)
- Shane O'Meara (born 1992)
- Liah O'Prey (born 1999) (born in Spain; Irish-French)
- Fionn O'Shea (born 1997)
- Nathan O'Toole (born 1998)
- Emma Eliza Regan (born 1992)
- Jack Reynor (born 1992)
- Saoirse Ronan (born 1994) (born in New York)
- Amy Shiels (born 1991)
- Ann Skelly (born 1996)
- Ayoola Smart (born 1994)
- Emily Taaffe (born 1984)
- Kelly Thornton (born 1997)
- Elva Trill (born 1990s)
- Sophie Vavasseur (born 1992)
- Chris Walley (born 1995)
- Ferdia Walsh-Peelo (born 1999)

== Born in the 2000s ==
- Catherine Clinch (born 2009)
- Hazel Doupe (born 2002)
- Jordanne Jones (born 2000)
- Niamh McCormack (born 2001)
- Lara McDonnell (born 2003)
- Demi Isaac Oviawe (born 2000) (born in Nigeria)
- Amybeth McNulty (born 2001) (Irish-Canadian)
- Art Parkinson (born 2001)
- David Rawle (born 2000)
- Alisha Weir (born 2009)

== Born in the 2010s ==
- Caoilinn Springall (born 2011/2012)

== Unknown birthdate ==
- Helen Behan
- Charlotte Bradley
- Zara Devlin
- Adam Fergus
- Kwaku Fortune
- Emmet Kirwan
- Éanna Hardwicke
- Sean Mahon
- Keith McErlean
- Leah McNamara
- Dermot Murphy
- Leia Murphy
- Eva O'Connor
- Ger Ryan
- Barry Ward
- David Wilmot

== See also ==
- Cinema of Ireland
- Irish theatre
- Lists of actors
- List of Irish people
- Radio in the Republic of Ireland
- Television in the Republic of Ireland
- List of Academy Award winners and nominees from Ireland
