= List of The Young Offenders episodes =

The Young Offenders is a coming-of-age sitcom, developed by Peter Foott. Adapted from the 2016 film of the same title, the programme began broadcasting through RTÉ2 in Ireland and BBC Three in the United Kingdom (all episodes are available for streaming via BBC iPlayer). The series follows the troubled lives of "lovable rogues" Conor MacSweeney (Alex Murphy) and Jock O'Keefe (Chris Walley).

The first series was broadcast between 1 February and 8 March 2018, consisting of six episodes. A Christmas special followed, which was released on 14 December of the same year. The success of the first series led to a second being commissioned, which aired for another six episodes, all episodes being available for streaming on 3 November 2019, though broadcast in Ireland weekly, until 8 December.

On 3 March 2023, it was confirmed that a fourth series had been commissioned by RTÉ and the BBC, also that the show would move to BBC One in the United Kingdom.

== Series overview ==
| Series | Episodes | Originally released (Ireland) | | |
| Series | Episodes | First released | Last released | Network |
|---|---|---|---|---|
| 1 | 6 | 1 February 2018 | 8 March 2018 | RTÉ2 |
| 1 | Special | 14 December 2018 | | RTÉ2 |
| 2 | 6 | 11 November 2019 | 16 December 2019 | RTÉ2 |
| 3 | 6 | 24 July 2020 | 28 August 2020 | RTÉ One |

| Series | Episodes | Originally released (United Kingdom) | | |
| Series | Episodes | First released | Last released | Network |
|---|---|---|---|---|
| 4 | 6 | 10 May 2024 | 7 June 2024 | BBC One |
| 4 | Special | 20 December 2024 | | BBC One |
| 5 | 6 | 3 April 2026 | 1 May 2026 | BBC One |

== Episodes ==
=== Series 1 (2018) ===
The first series was first released in the Ireland and the United Kingdom on 1 February 2018. It was broadcast on a weekly basis in both countries, concluding on 8 March 2018. A Christmas special was then broadcast, first released in the United Kingdom on 14 December 2018, though broadcast in Ireland on Christmas Day.

| No. overall | No. in series | Title | Directed by | Written by | Original release date | Irish overnight viewership |
|---|---|---|---|---|---|---|
| 1 | 1 | "Series 1, Episode 1" | Peter Foott | Peter Foott | 1 February 2018 | 277,000 |
Conor MacSweeney and Jock O'Keeffe are two 15-year-old students of St. Finan's Community School with a passion for criminal activity. When they steal lead from a building, the police begin looking for two teenagers who attend their school, a "tall, lanky, fast boy" and a "small, fat student, much slower than the other", and Sergeant Tony Healy comes to his closest attempt to arresting Jock, after a long time of trying to stop him from stealing the locals' bikes.
| 2 | 2 | "Series 1, Episode 2" | Peter Foott | Peter Foott | 8 February 2018 | N/A |
After the previous episode's events, Connor and Jock continue their criminal ways, despite their closeness to arrest. Connor falls for their principal's daughter Linda and the couple begin to date each other. However, Jock is unlucky in love with her sister Siobhan, as she discovers that he is unfaithful in relationships, and notable for sleeping with a variety of local girls. A "friendly" wrestling match between Conor and Principal Walsh escalates, ending in Conor punching Walsh in the face.
| 3 | 3 | "Series 1, Episode 3" | Peter Foott | Peter Foott | 15 February 2018 | N/A |
After his major fall-out with Linda, Conor convinces Linda and Siobhan to play truant from school with him and Jock. Conor says that the day will see them try and win them back over but if they fail they will never bother them again. It is the anniversary of Jock's mum's death, and his grief for his mother affects his attitude towards Siobhan. The quartet then agree to visit Jock's mum's grave, and sing "With or Without You", her favourite song, by her graveside. Mairead is pleasantly surprised by Conor's new tattoo.
| 4 | 4 | "Series 1, Episode 4" | Peter Foott | Peter Foott | 22 February 2018 | N/A |
When the ancient refrigerator of the MacSweeney household breaks down, Conor, Jock and Conor's mother Mairead set out on an eventful road trip to a remote farm to buy a cheap replacement, just as her late husband had done. Dropping him off at home that evening, Mairead tells Jock he's a bad influence on her son, which upsets him. She then hears his father abusing him from the street and immediately rushes in to rescue him, taking him in to her own home.
| 5 | 5 | "Series 1, Episode 5" | Peter Foott | Peter Foott | 1 March 2018 | N/A |
Conor and Jock take up their work experience at Mairead's fish counter in the English Market. With money tight in the MacSweeney household, Jock and Conor devise a plan to steal the heavily-priced blue fin tuna from the storage at their new place of work, sell it on and give all the money to Mairead.
| 6 | 6 | "Series 1, Episode 6" | Peter Foott | Peter Foott | 8 March 2018 | 366,000 |
Siobhan prepares to tell Jock about her pregnancy, whereas the boys are looking forward to their day out with their girlfriends at the cinema. Conor, who has a fear of commitment, is reluctant to his first kiss with Linda, and Jock convinces him to make the special moment happen. Things become scary when local bully Billy Murphy hijacks the bus the lads and their girlfriends are on.
| 7 | 7 | "Christmas Special" | Peter Foott | Peter Foott | 14 December 2018 (Note: The Christmas special is available to be watched or download via BBC iPlayer from 14 December 2018, though broadcast on television on 25 December 2018.) | 601,400 |
The residents of the estate of where Conor and Jock live are campaigning against the council's intentions of eviction, for the estate to be renovated, afraid that they might never get back into their homes. Meanwhile, Mairead, who has been ill for weeks now, is in hospital. Conor and Jock both show their concern, and intend to make her wish for a "white Christmas" come true.

=== Series 2 (2019) ===
The Young Offenders was recommissioned for a second series in February 2018. It was broadcast in Ireland between 11 November and 16 December 2019, though was released in the United Kingdom automatically through BBC iPlayer on 3 November.

| No. overall | No. in series | Title | Directed by | Written by | Original release date | Irish overnight viewership |
|---|---|---|---|---|---|---|
| 8 | 1 | "Series 2, Episode 1" | Tom Marshall | Peter Foott | 11 November 2019 | 370,000 |
Jock attempts to prove himself worthy of fatherhood to Principal Walsh by looking after an egg nicknamed "Jock Junior", after Walsh and Orla suggest that they adopt the baby to allow Jock and Siobhan their childhood back. Meanwhile, Conor and Linda prepare to have sex for the first time.
| 9 | 2 | "Series 2, Episode 2" | Tom Marshall | Peter Foott | 18 November 2019 | N/A |
Conor is jealous when new pupil Gavin - who has childhood ties with Jock - arrives at school, and he is determined not to be ousted as best friend. Conor struggles to stand up to Gavin - but it's not easy as the newcomer's mother has just started teaching at the school. Meanwhile, a spate of thefts leads Principal Walsh to patrolling the school grounds to monitor any potential stealing.
| 10 | 3 | "Series 2, Episode 3" | Tom Marshall | Peter Foott | 25 November 2019 | N/A |
After discovering that Conor's father was the mystery person who painted the "blue dog on the rock", Conor, Jock, Siobhan and Linda decide to go to the rock and repaint it in honour of Conor's father.
| 11 | 4 | "Series 2, Episode 4" | Tom Marshall | Peter Foott | 2 December 2019 | N/A |
Conor and Jock propose a new business idea to Mairead – a fish and chip van.
| 12 | 5 | "Series 2, Episode 5" | Tom Marshall | Peter Foott | 9 December 2019 | N/A |
Billy Murphy's life is put in danger when his former cellmate "Dinny the Teaspoon" is released from prison.
| 13 | 6 | "Series 2, Episode 6" | Tom Marshall | Peter Foott | 16 December 2019 | N/A |
A weekend break for the MacSweeney and Walsh families does not go according to plan after Jock attacks a gang trying to steal land off Cork. Siobhan is preparing to give birth.

=== Series 3 (2020) ===
In November 2019, it was confirmed that The Young Offenders had been recommissioned for a third series, to be broadcast in 2020, shortly after the second series concluded. Prior to its television premiere, the third series debuted on BBC iPlayer on 19 July.

| No. overall | No. in series | Title | Directed by | Written by | Original release date | Irish overnight viewership |
|---|---|---|---|---|---|---|
| 14 | 1 | "Series 3, Episode 1" | Shaun Wilson | Peter Foott & Gillian Roger Park | 24 July 2020 | N/A |
Conor and Jock are roped into an amateur heist masterminded by Billy Murphy, but drafting in baby Star causes chaos.
| 15 | 2 | "Series 3, Episode 2" | Shaun Wilson | Neil Webster | 31 July 2020 | N/A |
Healy finally manages to corner the boys whilst they use their false identities so they enlist the help of a furious Mairead, meaning the end of their infamous spells as Cork's masked thieves.
| 16 | 3 | "Series 3, Episode 3" | Shaun Wilson | Peter Foott | 7 August 2020 | N/A |
After learning of the boys' false identities, Mairead books a behaviour session in Dublin, resulting in a rocky road trip to a cheap bed and breakfast.
| 17 | 4 | "Series 3, Episode 4" | Simon Delaney | Peter Foott | 14 August 2020 | N/A |
The boys decide to make their girlfriends have the greatest night of their lives at the debs.
| 18 | 5 | "Series 3, Episode 5" | Simon Delaney | Peter Foott | 21 August 2020 | N/A |
Jock is caught up in a row with a local tearaway, leading to a challenge to a boxing match, to which Jock reluctantly agrees.
| 19 | 6 | "Series 3, Episode 6" | Simon Delaney | Neil Webster | 28 August 2020 | N/A |
Conor and Jock decide it's time to move out of home, to Spain, to Mairead's amusement. But an incident with Billy Murphy distracts them from their plan.

=== Series 4 (2024) ===
| No. overall | No. in series | Title | Directed by | Written by | Original release date | Irish overnight viewership |
|---|---|---|---|---|---|---|
| 20 | 1 | "Series 4, Episode 1" | Unknown | Unknown | 10 May 2024 | N/A |
Conor and Jock have grown older, but not necessarily any wiser.
| 21 | 2 | "Series 4, Episode 2" | Unknown | Unknown | 17 May 2024 | N/A |
Conor decides to do his Leaving Cert exam, placing a bet with his arch-enemy Gavin.
| 22 | 3 | "Series 4, Episode 3" | Unknown | Unknown | 24 May 2024 | N/A |
Mairéad tells Healy and Conor to take a fishing trip to see Healy's estranged father.
| 23 | 4 | "Series 4, Episode 4" | Unknown | Unknown | 31 May 2024 | N/A |
Billy Murphy and Conor embark on a relentless chase of the new Fake Billy.
| 24 | 5 | "Series 4, Episode 5" | Unknown | Unknown | 7 June 2024 | N/A |
Mairead unexpectedly hosts Star's birthday party, and Conor helps Jock join it remotely.
| 25 | 6 | "Series 4, Episode 6" | Unknown | Unknown | 7 June 2024 | N/A |
Jock tries to talk to Star, and Mairéad has to reveal her secret.
| 26 | 7 | "Christmas Special" | Unknown | Unknown | 20 December 2024 | N/A |
Mairéad, Sgt Healy and Conor are preparing for the imminent new arrival at Christmas time. Mairéad discovers a firearm in the house that Conor is holding for a friend.

=== Series 5 (2026) ===
| No. overall | No. in series | Title | Directed by | Written by | Original release date | Irish overnight viewership |
|---|---|---|---|---|---|---|
| 27 | 1 | "Series 5, Episode 1" | Unknown | Unknown | 3 April 2026 | N/A |
Conor and Jock are finally back together after Jock makes a lucky escape from his nightmare Colombian prison and becomes a stowaway on a ship bound for Cork.
| 28 | 2 | "Series 5, Episode 2" | Unknown | Unknown | 10 April 2026 | N/A |
The lads decide it's time to expand their empire in Cork city. Their days of doing all the hard work are over – they plan to become the bosses now.
| 29 | 3 | "Series 5, Episode 3" | Unknown | Unknown | 17 April 2026 | N/A |
Linda Walsh, Conor's one true love, will marry another man, which can only lead to chaos at the wedding.
| 30 | 4 | "Series 5, Episode 4" | Unknown | Unknown | 24 April 2026 | N/A |
It’s time for Conor and Jock to try the exciting Cork dating scene when two girls visiting the city catch their attention.
| 31 | 5 | "Series 5, Episode 5" | Unknown | Unknown | 1 May 2026 | N/A |
Mairéad and the lads take the family car on a road trip to pick up her unpredictable mother, but disaster strikes.
| 32 | 6 | "Series 5, Episode 6" | Unknown | Unknown | 1 May 2026 | N/A |
Sun and sand are the new dream, but how can the lads afford it? Enter Billy Murphy with a daring whiskey-heist idea.
