= St Francis College Rochestown =

Secondary school in Cork, Ireland

St. Francis College Rochestown
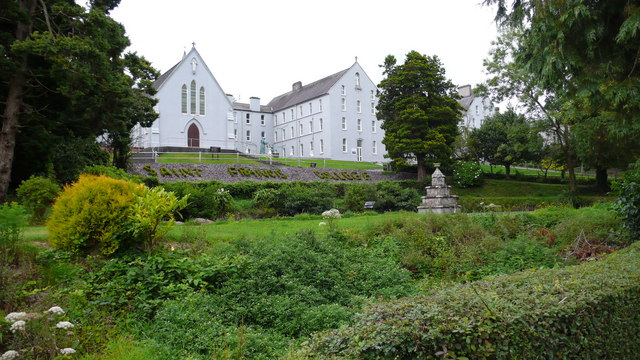

Location
- Monastery Road, Rochestown, Cork, Ireland; 51.869°N 8.376°W

Information
- School type: Secondary school
- Motto: Make the Difference
- Religious affiliation: Catholic
- Founded: 1884
- Principal: Marie Ring
- Gender: Male
- Enrollment: 768 (2019)
- Colors: Black and white
- Nickname: Roco
- Website: stfranciscollege.ie

St. Francis College Rochestown, sometimes known as Rochestown College or abbreviated as Roco, is an all-boys secondary school in Rochestown, Cork, Ireland. The school's foundation dates to 1884 when a friary was formed by the Franciscan Order.

== History ==
In the 1870s the Capuchin (Franciscan) order of friars opened a church and monastery on the Rochestown-Monkstown road near Cork city. In the 1880s, a school for novitiates (those seeking to join the order) was opened on the site. While this novitiate school was moved to Kilkenny and elsewhere for some decades, in the 1930s the school returned to the Rochestown friary. In the late 1960s and early 1970s, coinciding with a move to free education in the state, the college expanded into the friary itself, and "dormitories were converted into classrooms". The school continues to operate as a voluntary secondary school under the trusteeship of the Capuchin Franciscan Order.

== Extra-curricular activities ==
Sporting and extra-curricular activities in the school include debating, Gaelic football, hurling, soccer, basketball, badminton, debating and chess.

== Notable graduates ==
- Alan Cadogan - Cork GAA
- John Cashman - Cork GAA
- Niall Cashman - Cork GAA
- Alan Connolly - Cork GAA
- Edwin Fitzgibbon - Capuchin priest and professor of psychology at UCC, who donated the Fitzgibbon Cup for inter-varsity hurling.
- Josh Honohan - professional footballer
- John Kelly - Rugby union player with Munster and Ireland
- Shane Kingston - Cork GAA
- Dominic MacHale - actor (The Young Offenders)
- Alex Murphy - actor (The Young Offenders)
- Kilian O'Callaghan - ballet dancer and choreographer
- Darragh O'Mahony - Rugby union player
- Terry Shannon - Lord Mayor of Cork in 2011
- Paul Wallace - Rugby union player
- Richard Wallace - Rugby union player
- Niall O'Flaherty and Patrick O'Connell - members of The Sultans of Ping FC.
