= Buttered eggs =

Irish food and egg preservation method

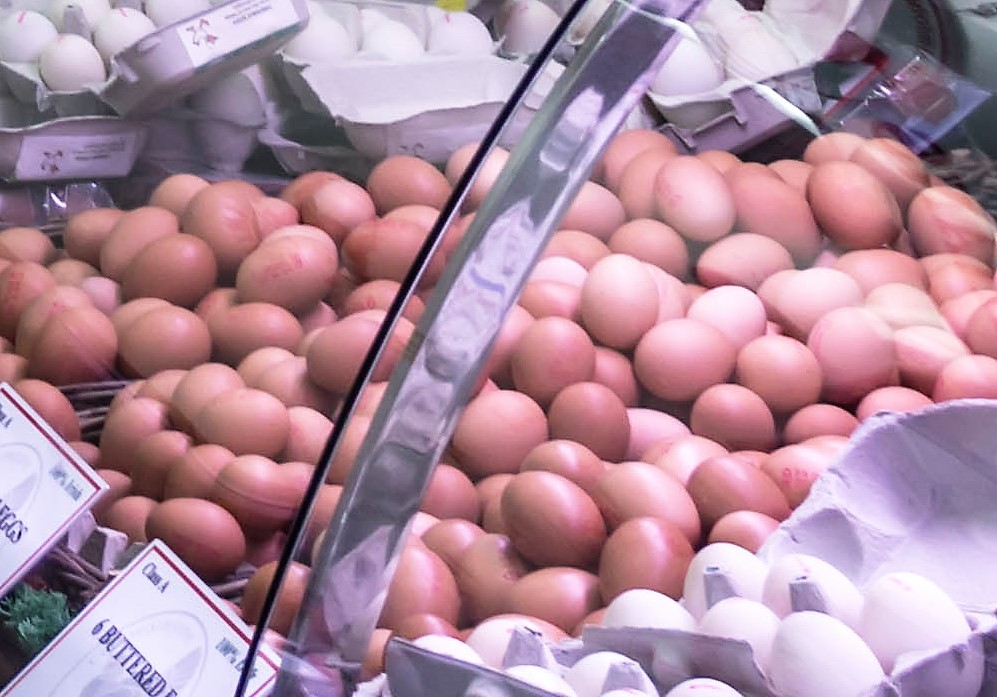
Buttered eggs at the English Market in Cork

Buttered eggs are a traditional Irish food and a method of preserving eggs.

Freshly laid eggs are rubbed with butter by hand. The melted butter is quickly absorbed by the porous eggshells. Once cooled, the hardened butter acts as a sealant, preventing air from entering the shells and thus preserving them for up to six months. Eggs preserved in this way have a glossy appearance and a buttery flavour.

This method of preservation also ensured that a supply of eggs would be available during the winter months, when hens egg production would be at its lowest. This also supported the Catholic custom of not eating eggs during the Lenten period, saving them instead for Easter.

During the first and second World Wars, when fresh eggs were rationed, the demand for them was particularly high, and only buttered eggs were available in sufficient quantities. Buttered eggs are sold in the English Market, Cork.
