= Des MacHale =

Irish mathematician, academic

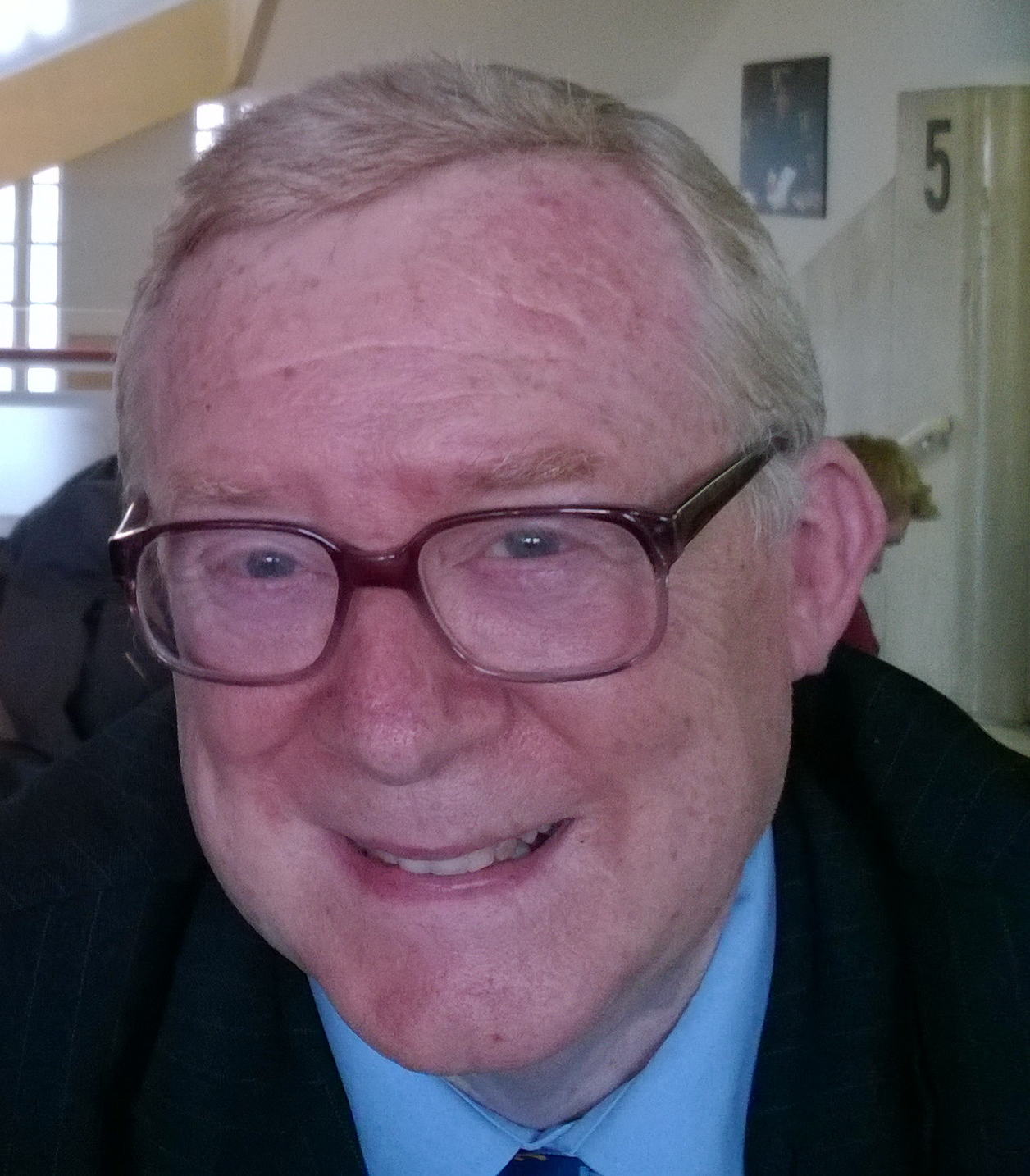
- Born: Desmond MacHale; 28 January 1946 (age 80); Castlebar, County Mayo, Ireland
- Education: University College Galway (BSc, MSc); University of Keele (PhD)
- Occupations: Mathematician, author
- Known for: Biography of George Boole
- Children: Dominic MacHale

Desmond MacHale (born 28 January 1946) is an Irish mathematician who is Emeritus Professor of Mathematics at University College Cork. He is an author and speaker on several subjects, including George Boole, lateral thinking puzzles, and humour. He has published over 80 books, some of which have been translated into languages including Danish, Italian, Norwegian, Spanish, German, Korean, and Japanese.

== Biography ==
Des MacHale was born in Castlebar, County Mayo. He earned his BSc and MSc in mathematical science at University College Galway in 1967 and 1968, and completed his PhD at the University of Keele in 1972 under Hans Liebeck. Since then he has been at University College Cork, where his research has focussed on group and ring theory, especially Boolean rings.

In 1985 MacHale published George Boole: His Life and Work, the first book length biography of Boole. In 2014, a year ahead of Boole's bicentennial, this was reissued in revised and expanded form as The Life and Work of George Boole: A Prelude to the Digital Age. He is considered the world's leading expert on Boole and in 2018 published another book New Light on George Boole, co-authored with Yvonne Cohen.

MacHale has also authored books on other subjects, including brainteasers and he has written more than 30 books of jokes and discussions of humour. His Comic Sections: The Book of Mathematical Jokes, Humour, Wit and Wisdom is a book which combines two of his interests. He has written over a dozen books of lateral thinking problems with author Paul Sloane; and many of these problems are featured on the Futility Closet website. He has written several books about the 1952 American film, The Quiet Man. He has spoken at schools, on radio, and television on the subjects of mathematics, humour, and puzzles.

MacHale designed the logo of the Irish Mathematical Society.

He is a longtime opponent of smoking, and for decades has played a role within the Irish Association of Non-Smokers. He appeared on RTÉ's The Late Late Show as early as the 1980s in an attempt to educate the public about the dangers of smoking.

His son Dominic MacHale is an actor, known for The Young Offenders.

== Superbrain competition ==
From 1984 to 2007, MacHale ran the Superbrain Competition at University College Cork, including setting the questions and grading the papers. A book of the questions (with solutions) from 1984 to 2008 was published in 2011 as The First Twenty-Five Years of the Superbrain by Diarmuid Early & Des MacHale.

== Selected books ==
Books by Des MacHale include:

- 2023 Sip & Solve Two-Minute Brainteasers (with Paul Sloane), Puzzlewright, ISBN 9781454947974
- 2022 Comic Sections Plus, Logic Press, ISBN 9781471761478
- 2020 The Poetry of George Boole, Logic Press, ISBN 9781716520273
- 2020 Number and Letter Puzzles, Logic Press, ISBN 9780244231002
- 2018 New Light on George Boole (with Yvonne Cohen), Cork University Press, ISBN 9781782052906
- 2016 Lateral Thinking Puzzles in Mathematics, (with Paul Sloane), Puzzlewright, ISBN 9781454911678
- 2015 Mathematical Lateral Thinking Puzzles (with Paul Sloane), Sterling Publishing, ISBN 978-1-4549-1167-8
- 2014 The First Twenty-Five Years of the Superbrain (with Diarmuid Early), United Kingdom Mathematics Trust, ISBN 1906001227
- 2014 The First Twenty-Five Years of the Superbrain (with Diarmuid Early), United Kingdom Mathematics Trust, ISBN 1906001227
- 2014 The Life and Work of George Boole : a Prelude to the Digital Age, Cork University Press, ISBN 1782050051
- 2006 Puzzleology: Tough Puzzles for Kids, Mercier Press, ISBN 9781856355087
- 2004 Picture The quiet man : an illustrated celebration, Appletree, ISBN 9780862819309
- 2002 Sit & Solve - Lateral Thinking Puzzles (with Paul Sloane), Puzzlewright, ISBN 9780806957050
- 1995 Best Irish Humorous Quotations, Mercier Press, ISBN 1-85635-138-6
- 1993 Comic Sections: The Book of Mathematical Jokes, Humour, Wit and Wisdom, Boole Press, ISBN 1-85748-006-6
- 1989 The World's Best Maggie Thatcher Jokes, Angus & Robertson, ISBN 0-207-16224-7
- 1987 The Book of Irish Bull: Better than All the Udders, Mercier Press, ISBN 0-85342-822-0
- 1985 George Boole: His Life and Work, Boole Press, ISBN 0-906783-14-3

== Awards and honours ==
On George Boole Day, 2 November 2015, University College Cork awarded MacHale an honorary doctorate of literature in recognition of his contributions to scholarship on Boole.

On 15 October 2016 Maths Week Ireland presented MacHale with the inaugural "Raising Public Awareness of Maths" award. In 2026, he was made a member of the Royal Irish Academy.
