= 14th Irish Film & Television Awards =

Annual Irish media awards ceremony

14th IFTA Film & Drama Awards
- Date: 8 April 2017
- Site: Mansion House, Dublin (Film Awards)
- Hosted by: Deirdre O'Kane

Highlights
- Best Film: A Date for Mad Mary
- Best Direction: Richie Smyth; The Siege of Jadotville
- Best Actor: Colm Meaney; The Journey
- Best Actress: Ruth Negga; Loving
- Most awards: The Siege of Jadotville (3)
- Most nominations: An Klondike (10)

The 14th IFTA Film & Drama Awards took place at the Mansion House on 8 April 2017 in Dublin, honouring Irish film and television drama released in 2016. Deirdre O'Kane hosted the film awards ceremony. Rising Star Award nominees were announced prior to the ceremony, on 24 March 2017.

== Film Awards ==
The nominations for the IFTA Film & Drama Awards were announced by the Irish Film and Television Academy. Winners are denoted by bold letters.

=== Film categories ===
Best Film

- A Date for Mad Mary
  - Love & Friendship
  - The Journey
  - The Secret Scripture
  - The Siege of Jadotville
  - Tomato Red
  - The Young Offenders

George Morrison Feature Documentary

- Mattress Men
  - It's Not Yet Dark
  - In Loco Parentis
  - Bobby Sands: 66 Days
  - Atlantic

Best Short Film

- Second to None
  - Define Intervention
  - Don't Forget the Bread
  - The Lost Letter

Best Director

- Richie Smyth - The Siege of Jadotville
  - Peter Foott - The Young Offenders
  - Jim Sheridan - The Secret Scripture
  - Darren Thornton - A Date for Mad Mary

Script Film

- Peter Foott - The Young Offenders
  - Kevin Brodbin - The Siege of Jadotville
  - Darren Thornton and Colin Thornton - A Date for Mad Mary
  - Juanita Wilson - Tomato Red

Lead Actress

- Ruth Negga - Loving
  - Caoilfhionn Dunne - In View
  - Seana Kerslake - A Date for Mad Mary
  - Aisling Loftus - Property of the State
  - Catherine Walker - A Dark Song

Lead Actor

- Colm Meaney - The Journey
  - Jamie Dornan -The Siege of Jadotville
  - Michael Fassbender - The Light Between Oceans
  - Alex Murphy - The Young Offenders
  - Mark O'Halloran - History's Future

Best Supporting Actor

- Jason O'Mara - The Siege of Jadotville
  - Colin Farrell - Fantastic Beasts and Where to Find Them
  - Brendan Gleeson - Trespass Against Us
  - Ciaran Hinds - Bleed for This
  - Chris Walley - The Young Offenders

Best Supporting Actress

- Charleigh Bailey - A Date for Mad Mary
  - Susan Lynch - Bad Day for the Cut
  - Simone Kirby - Notes on Blindness
  - Hilary Rose - The Young Offenders
  - Fiona Shaw - Out of Innocence

=== Craft ===
Best Original Score

- Brian Byrne - The Secret Scripture
  - David Holmes - The Fall
  - Steve Lynch - An Klondike
  - Patrick Cassidy - Smalltown

Best Editing

- Nick Emerson - I Am Not a Serial Killer
  - Colin Campbell - The Young Offenders
  - Dermot Diskin - The Secret Scripture
  - Úna Ní Dhonghaíle - The Crown

Best Production Design

- Derek Wallace - The Secret Scripture
  - Mark Geraghty - Vikings
  - Mark Kelly - An Klondike
  - Anna Rackard - Love & Friendship

Best Cinematography

- Seamus McGarvey - Nocturnal Animals
  - Piers McGrail - Tomato Red
  - Robbie Ryan - American Honey
  - Cathal Watters - An Klondike

Best Costume Design

- Consolata Boyle - Florence Foster Jenkins
  - Joan Bergin - The Secret Scripture
  - Triona Lillis - An Klondike
  - Eimer Ní Mhaoldomhnaigh - Love & Friendship

Best Make Up/Hair

- Vikings
  - An Klondike
  - Love & Friendship
  - Wrecking the Rising

Best Sound

- Tomato Red
  - The Siege of Jadotville
  - Game of Thrones
  - Without Name

Best VFX

- The Siege of Jadotville
  - Black Sails
  - Ripper Street
  - Game of Thrones

=== International categories ===
International Film

- Moonlight
  - Hacksaw Ridge
  - La La Land
  - Manchester by the Sea

International Actor

- Casey Affleck - Manchester by the Sea
  - Andrew Garfield - Hacksaw Ridge
  - Ryan Gosling - La La Land
  - Denzel Washington - Fences

International Actress

- Emma Stone - La La Land
  - Amy Adams - Arrival
  - Viola Davis - Fences
  - Natalie Portman - Jackie

=== Television Drama categories ===
Drama

- Vikings
  - An Klondike
  - The Fall
  - Game of Thrones
  - Smalltown
  - Striking Out

Director Drama

- Dathai Keane - An Klondike
  - Anthony Byrne - Ripper Street
  - Ciaran Donnelly - Vikings
  - Neasa Hardiman - Z: The Beginning of Everything

Script Drama

- James Phelan - Wrecking the Rising
  - Gerard Barrett - Smalltown
  - Barry Devlin - My Mother and Other Strangers
  - Marcus Fleming - An Klondike

Actor in a Lead Role in Drama

- Cillian Murphy - Peaky Blinders
  - Dara Devaney - An Klondike
  - James Nesbitt - The Secret
  - Aidan Turner - Poldark
  - Tom Vaughan-Lawlor - Trial of the Century

Actress in a Lead Role in Drama

- Amy Huberman - Striking Out
  - Caitriona Balfe - Outlander
  - Elaine Cassidy - No Offence
  - Anne Marie Duff - Murder: The Lost Weekend
  - Ruth Negga - Preacher

Supporting Actor in a Drama

- Ned Dennehy - An Klondike
  - Liam Cunningham - Game of Thrones
  - Moe Dunford - Vikings
  - Andrew Scott - The Hollow Crown
  - Robert Sheehan - Fortitude

Supporting Actress in a Drama

- Charlie Murphy - Happy Valley
  - Ruth Bradley - HUM∀NS
  - Sinead Cusack - Call the Midwife
  - Dominique McElligott - House of Cards
  - Charlene McKenna - Ripper Street

== Special ==
=== Rising Star Award ===
- Patrick Gibson (Actor — The OA, Property of the State, Their Finest, What Richard Did)
  - Peter Foott (Director/Writer — Republic of Telly, The Young Offenders)
  - Barry Keoghan (Actor — The Killing of a Sacred Deer, Mammal, Rebellion, Trespass Against Us)
  - Seána Kerslake (Actor — Can't Cope, Won't Cope; A Date for Mad Mary; Dollhouse)

=== Lifetime Achievement Award ===
- Michael Gambon (a unique and beloved Irish talent who has entertained and won the hearts and minds of audiences far and wide)
