= Shane Casey =

Shane Casey may refer to:

- Shane Casey (actor), Irish actor
- Shane Casey (hurler), Waterford hurling player
- Shane Casey, a CSI:NY character
