= The Young Offenders =

The Young Offenders may refer to:

- The Young Offenders (film), a 2016 feature film directed by Peter Foott
- The Young Offenders (TV series), a television series based on the film, developed by Peter Foott
