= Hilary Rose (actress) =

Irish actress and writer

- Born: August 16, 1979 (age 46); Galway, Ireland
- Occupations: Actress; writer
- Years active: 2005–present
- Known for: The Young Offenders
- Spouse: Peter Foott (m. 2010)

Hilary Rose (born 16 August 1979) is an Irish actress and writer. She is best known for her portrayal of Mairéad MacSweeney in The Young Offenders franchise, including the 2016 feature film and its subsequent television series, which commenced in 2018.

== Early life ==
Rose was born in 1979 in Galway, and was raised in Cork.

== Career ==
Her first credit was in the short film The Kings of Cork City in 2005. The majority of Rose's earlier credits include minor roles in Fair City (2007), Apollo Music Club (2008), Zonad (2009), The Tudors (2010), Galactik Football (2010), Republic of Telly (2011), The Fear (2012), Vikings (2013), Beat Girl (2013), The Centre (2014) and Sacrifice (2016).

In 2016, Rose was cast in the role of Máiréad MacSweeney in the 2016 feature film The Young Offenders, developed by her husband Peter Foott. The film was a success, it had the biggest opening weekend at the Irish box office of any Irish film in 2016. As a result of her critically acclaimed performance in the film, Rose was nominated for "Best Actress in a Supporting Role" at the 2017 Irish Film and Television Awards, in which she lost out to Charleigh Bailey.

The Young Offenders led to a television series, which commenced in 2018 on BBC Three and RTÉ2, which was aired between February and March 2018. The success of the first led to a second being commissioned, broadcast in November 2019.

== Personal life ==
Rose is married to award-winning director Peter Foott. They have collaborated in The Young Offenders franchise.

== Filmography ==
Year	Title	Role	Notes
2005	The Kings of Cork City	Elvis sister	Short film
2007	Fair City	Dorothy	1 episode
2008	Apollo Music Club	Susan	
2009	Zonad	Manicurist	Uncredited
2010	The Tudors	Queen's Maiden	1 episode, uncredited
2010	Galactik Football	Lun-Zia	4 episodes
2011	Republic of Telly	Handie Sandie	9 episodes
2011	Republic of Telly	Trapattoni's Interpreter	9 episodes
2011	Republic of Telly	Nuacht Reader	9 episodes
2012	The Fear		
2013	Vikings	Female Servant #4	1 episode
2013	Beat Girl	Laila	
2014	The Centre	Maggie Brennan	6 episodes
2016	Sacrifice	Janice Shaw	
2016	The Young Offenders	Mairéad MacSweeney	
2018–Present	The Young Offenders	Máiréad MacSweeney	TV series

== Awards and nominations ==
Hilary Rose won Comedian of the Year at the Stellar Magazine Shine Awards 2014.

Year	Work	Award	Result	Notes
2017	The Young Offenders	Best Supporting Actress – Film	Nominated	
