= A Date for Mad Mary =

- Irish poster
- Directed by: Darren Thornton
- Written by: Darren Thornton; Colin Thornton
- Produced by: Juliette Bonass; Ed Guiney
- Starring: Seána Kerslake; Tara Lee; Charleigh Bailey; Denise McCormack; Siobhan Shanahan
- Cinematography: Ole Bratt Birkeland
- Edited by: Tony Cranstoun; Juangus Dinsmore
- Production companies: Irish Film Board; Element Pictures
- Distributed by: Element Pictures Distribution
- Release dates: 2 July 2016 (KVIFF); 2 September 2016 (Ireland)
- Running time: 82 minutes
- Country: Ireland
- Language: English

A Date for Mad Mary is a 2016 Irish drama film directed by Darren Thornton and starring Seána Kerslake. It won two Irish Film & Television Awards, including Best Film. Thornton and his brother Colin adapted it from Yasmine Akram's one-woman play 10 Dates with Mad Mary (2010).

== Plot ==
"Mad" Mary McArdle (Seána Kerslake), a young woman with a propensity for violent, antisocial behaviour, is released from prison following an assault on another woman at a club. Upon Mary's return to Drogheda to live with her mother and grandmother, she tries to reconnect with old friends and acquaintances. Mary learns that her best friend since childhood, Charlene (Charleigh Bailey), is getting married, and Mary spends a significant portion of the film writing her maid of honour speech to deliver at the wedding. However, as the film develops, it shows that there is a growing distance between Charlene and Mary, as Mary futilely attempts to arrange to spend time with an increasingly busy and uninterested Charlene.

Mary signs up for a speed dating service to meet men with the sole purpose of finding a 'plus one' to accompany her at Charlene's wedding, but each date ends unsuccessfully, with Mary unable to connect with any of the men. Ultimately, Mary desires only to find a man so she can impress Charlene and Charlene's friends, and prove that she could find a desirable man despite Mary's lack of interest in any of the men she dates. Meanwhile, while solidifying plans with Charlene's wedding photographer Jess (Tara Lee), Mary and Jess strike up an unlikely friendship. Over time, Mary and Jess grow to explore their feelings and become more vulnerable with one another. The film climaxes with Mary accepting that she has developed romantic feelings for Jess.

== Cast ==
- Seána Kerslake as Mary McArdle
- Tara Lee as Jess
- Charleigh Bailey as Charlene
- Denise McCormack as Suzanne McArdle
- Siobhan Shanahan as Leona
- Barbara Brennan as Nan McArdle
- Norma Sheahan as Sally
- Ben Condron as Declan
- Shauna Higgins as Julie
- Jamiu Giwa as Udel
- Mark Dunne as Scote
- Tatiana Ouliankina as Oksana
- Carolyn Bracken as a female prison guard
- Susie Power as Rita

== Release ==
A Date for Mad Mary premiered at the Karlovy Vary International Film Festival in the Czech Republic on 2 July 2016. It won Best Irish Feature Film at the Galway Film Fleadh, while Seána Kerslake won the Bingham Ray New Talent Award. It was released on 2 September to critical acclaim.

== Critical reception ==
The film retains a 94% positive rating out of 17 reviews on review aggregating site Rotten Tomatoes.

The reviewer for the Irish Independent said: "A Date for Mad Mary is the best Irish film I've seen in a long time, and blends comedy, romance and pathos with extraordinary skill." Donald Clarke in The Irish Times complimented the film for being "an exercise in character study," remarking that it might be "a serious contender for best Irish release of 2016". In another positive review, Jessica Kiang in Variety called the A Date for Mad Mary a "winning Irish charmer" with "rounded supporting characters, its skewering use of language, and the pinpoint accuracy of its observations of life in this specific time and place." Fionnuala Halligan in Screen International called the film "special" and singled out Seána Kerslake's performance in particular, calling it a breakout performance. Guy Lodge in The Guardian called the film "Darren Thornton’s simple, lovable but oh-so-slightly barbed directorial debut" in a positive review that also singled out Kerslake's performance as Mary.

=== Accolades ===
Awards	Category	Recipients and nominees	Result
Irish Film & Television Awards	Best Film	A Date for Mad Mary	Won
Irish Film & Television Awards	Best Director	Darren Thornton	Nominated
Irish Film & Television Awards	Best Script	Darren Thornton and Colin Thornton	Nominated
Irish Film & Television Awards	Best Actress	Seana Kerslake	Nominated
Irish Film & Television Awards	Best Supporting Actress	Charleigh Bailey	Won
