= Galactik Football =

Animated television series

- Series logo along with the characters
- Genre: Action fiction; Science fiction; Sports fiction
- Created by: Augias Imaginaction (Note: A collective group of creators consisting of Charles Barrez, Pascal Boutboul, Nadége Girardot, Guillaume Mautalent, Sébastien Oursel, Flavien Vandelli and Vincent Vandelli.)
- Directed by: Antoine Charreyron (season 1); Frédéric Dybowski (season 1–2); Henri Zaitoun (season 2); Dominique Etchecopar (season 3)
- Voices of: Anne Byrne; Malcolm Douglas; Michael Fitzgerald; Roger Gregg; Lara Lenehan; Dermot Magennis; Doireann Ní Chorragáin; Caitríona Ní Mhurchú; Gavin O'Connor; Morgan C. Jones; Dominic Catrambone; Mario Rosenstock; Jonathan Ryan; Susan Slott; Eoghan Ó Riada; Hilary Rose; Luc Ó Riada
- Opening theme: "Main Theme Galactik Football"
- Composers: Marc Tomasi; Mehdi Elmorabit
- Countries of origin: France; Luxembourg (season 1); India (season 3); Ireland (season 3)
- Original language: French
- No. of seasons: 3
- No. of episodes: 78 (list of episodes)

Production
- Executive producers: Clément Calvet; Christian Davin (seasons 1–2); Paul Cummins (season 3)
- Producers: Justine Huynh Van Phuong (season 3); Heath Kenny (season 3); Siobhán Ní Ghadhra (season 3)
- Running time: 23 minutes
- Production companies: Gaumont-Alphanim (Note: Known as Alphanim during seasons 1–2.); Audi'Art; Welkin (season 1); Hosem (season 1); LuxAnimation (season 1); Supersonic (season 1); Carloon (season 2); Europool (seasons 2–3); Telegael (season 3); DQ Entertainment (season 3)

Original release
- Network: France 2 (France, seasons 1–2); Gulli (France, season 3); Jetix (Europe, season 1–2); Disney XD (Europe, season 3)
- Release: 3 June 2006 – 27 October 2011

Galactik Football is an animated television series created by Augias Imaginaction and co-produced by Gaumont-Alphanim, France 2 (seasons 1–2) and Telegael (season 3) in association with Audi'Art, Welkin (season 1), Hosem (season 1), LuxAnimation (season 1), Jetix Europe (seasons 1–2), Carloon (season 2), Europool (season 2) and DQ Entertainment (season 3) with the participation of Gulli (season 3) and Disney XD (season 3). The series mixes conventional 2D animation with 3D computer graphics. It originally aired from 3 June 2006 to 27 October 2011.

Galactik Football is set in the far future, where the inhabited worlds of the Zaelion Galaxy compete in Galactik Football, a sport analogous to association football, but played seven to a side. The game is complicated by the addition of the Flux, a cosmic energy that enhances a player's attributes such as speed, strength, and agility, or grants special powers such as teleportation. The story follows the fate of an inexperienced Galactik Football team, the Snow Kids, as they aim to compete in and win the Galactik Football Cup.

== Plot ==
=== Season 1 ===
The story begins during a match between the home team of planet Akillian and the Shadows. As Aarch, captain of the Akillians, takes a direct free kick, an explosion is heard and an avalanche sweeps over the stadium, marking the beginning of the Akillian Ice Age and the loss of The Breath, Akillian's Flux.

The storyline jumps forward 15 years. Aarch and his friend Clamp, a robotic technician, arrive back in Akillian for the first time since the game. Aarch aims to create a new Akillian Galactik Football team capable of winning the Cup and selects a group of talented teenagers for his team: D'Jok, Sinedd, Micro-Ice, Mei, Thran, Ahito, Rocket, and Tia. However, Rocket's father and Aarch's brother do not want him on the team and agree only to let him play on the condition that the newly named Snow Kids win a match against the incumbent Akillian team, the Red Tigers, who are coached by Aarch's estranged old friend and team-mate, Artegor Nexus. During her tryout, Tia reveals that she has the power of the long-lost Breath of Akillian.

The Snow Kids beat the Red Tigers, becoming the new Akillian team. However, an embittered Artegor lures Sinedd away from the Snow Kids and recruits him to the Shadows, whom he has agreed to coach.

As the Snow Kids progress through the competition, each develops the Breath of Akillian. There are some intra-team tensions caused by Tia and Rocket's burgeoning relationship and Micro-Ice's unrequited crush on Mei. Unknown to any of them is that all seven of the players have been affected by the Meta-Flux, a synthetic undetectable Flux, inadvertently created by Clamp and pirate Sonny Blackbones, which was the true origin of the Akillian Ice Age. This Flux is now coveted by the ruthless General Bleylock, who happily endangers the Snow Kids to get his hands on it.

With the help of Clamp and his old partner, the pirate Sonny Blackbones, the Snow Kids escape General Bleylock's machinations and win the Galactik Football Cup.

=== Season 2 ===
In season 2, Ahito falls ill and is replaced as a goalkeeper by his cousin Yuki. Also, Rocket is suspended from the team due to illegal use of The Breath and is replaced by Mark, another young Akillian soccer player, who had previously been considered as a substitute player. In Rocket's absence, D'Jok is made captain. After Ahito's recovery he and Yuki share duties as goalkeeper and upon finding in his favor the League allows Rocket to return to the team, which he eventually did. D'Jok remains captain on Rocket's return and leads the team to a second consecutive GFC victory.

=== Season 3 ===
A year after their second Galactic Football Cup victory in succession, the mysterious Lord Phoenix invites everyone in the galaxy to a special mixed-flux tournament on the planet Paradisia. After a bad friendly match against the Shadows, D'Jok and Mei have an argument. Mei dumps D'Jok and joins the Shadows. Yuki leaves the Snow Kids temporarily to join the Elektras, and D'Jok leaves the team after being recruited by Team Paradisia. A Wamba named Lun-Zia joins the Snow Kids for the mixed-flux tournament.

Due to the injection of flux in the core of the Planet Paradisia, Paradisia explodes but luckily everyone was evacuated from the planets with the help of the Galactik Football Players. There is also the Galactik Football Cup which was won by the Snow Kids vs Team Paradisia. This made the Snow kids win the 3 cups in a row and first team who ever did it.

A year after the third GFC victory of Snow Kids, the team was in the base for having a training match with Galactik Kids who are called the stars of the future. Clamp presses the button to start the training session in the Holo-Trainer and then a mysterious energy appears, seeds Mei and Micro Ice from Snow Kids, whole the Galactik Kids and Hush Sharky the paparazzi, teleports them to the deep space with leaving a major cliff-hanger on the back.

Disney XD UK aired the first 8 episodes of season 3 in 2010. It was 10 October 2011 before Disney XD was able to air episode 9 of season 3. The remaining episodes have been aired on consecutive days, with the series finale airing on 27 October 2011.

=== Season 4 ===
After 15 years passed on the major cliff-hanger of season 3 finale, which resulted in the disappearance of Micro Ice and Mei, Galactik Kids and Hush Sharky, there's no official season 4 yet.

But a hopeful piece of news for the fans and others who are interested in Galactik Football was shared after the interview between a French YouTuber named Alex San and Vincent and Flavien Vandelli, who are the original creators of the Galactik Football series. According to the interview and later posts on some social media platforms like Reddit, San pointed out that he wants to create a fourth season by working with them. Additionally, from the same posts, it's being understood that the original creators are working to give an official fourth season to the public.

== Cast ==
- Mario Rosenstock as D'Jok, Barry Rant, Duke Maddox, Baldwin, D'Jado, Akamouk, Zoran, additional voices.
- Michael Fitzgerald as Rocket, Harvey.
- Lara Lenahan as Tia, Addim, Xeeria, Paradisia, additional voices.
- Dominic Catrambone as Micro-Ice.
- Anthony Royer as Micro-Ice.
- Gavin O'Connor as Sinedd, Mark, Sonny Blackbones, Warren, Arty, Woowamboo, Ron Zaera, additional voices.
- Doireann Ní Chorragáin as Mei, Yuki, Kernor, Sunja, Zoelene, Lucille, Olka, Kim.
- Dermot Magennis as Thran, Ahito, Flint Corso, Bennett, Hush Sharky, Doukooba, additional voices.
- Hilary Rose as Lun-Zia, Nina, Nikki, Lun-Zaera, additional voices.
- Jonathan Ryan as Aarch, Harris, Bellow, Ataro, Otis, additional voices.
- Morgan C. Jones as Clamp, Wolfen, additional voices.
- Susan Slott as Dame Simbai, Callie Mystic.
- Malcolm Douglas as Artegor Nexus, Norata, Nork Ag'Net, Brim Balarius, additional voices.
- Roger Gregg as Sydney, General Bleylock, Brim Simbra, Luur, Stevens, Nihla, additional voices.
- Anne Byrne as Maya, Vega, Momice, Stella, additional voices.
- Eoghan Ó Riada as Lord Phoenix, Magnus Blade.
- Caitriona Ni Mhurchu as Kyra.
- J. Scott Thompson as additional voice.

== Characters ==
- D'Jok is considered to be the star player of the Snow Kids and plays as the striker. He is dedicated to Galactik Football and tries his best to make sure the Snow Kids win the Galactik Football Cup. In season 1, D'Jok was brought up by his foster mom Maya, who took him in as her adoptive son upon his biological mother's request before she died. Despite refusing to foretell his future, D'Jok later finds out that Sonny Blackbones is his father. D'Jok's mother died after giving birth to him and Maya took him under her care. In season 2, D'Jok got to take Rocket's place in the All-Star Match, due to his suspension and became the team captain. In season 3, D'Jok leaves the Snow Kids for Team Paradisia but eventually returns to the team. He also teaches a group of kids how to play Soccar along with the help of Warren and Artegor. Toward the end of season 1, D'Jok and Mei shared a kiss and dated till the beginning of season 3. Mei accused D'Jok to be too controlling and left him for Sinedd. However, D'Jok shares a kiss with Nikki 4 whom Mei sees on the screen caught by a paparazzi and got upset about it. D'Jok is seen to be arrogant and sometimes selfish, but he also has a caring side. He is best friends with Micro-Ice and good friends with Thran, Ahito, and Mark too. Subsequently, Sinedd is D'Jok's arch-enemy, as both of them compete against each other to see who is the better one. Although, at the end of season 3, they get along with each other. D'Jok cites Warren as his favorite Galactik Soccar player. D'Jok wears jersey number 9. He is described to have red spiky hair and green eyes.
- Rocket is Aarch's nephew and the son of former Galactik Soccar star Norata. In season 1, Rocket helped his father with his flower company. His father banned him from going to Aarch's tryout. But Rocket eventually goes only to help Tia get to the tryouts. However, Rocket makes it to the Snow Kids as the team captain, as Aarch told Norata that his son could be the next Galactik Soccar star and has potential. Rocket later finds out, from Tia, that his mother, Kira, is still alive. She pays a visit to him on his 16th birthday, but Rocket gets upset about it as he thought his mother walked out on him and Norata after his birth. However, he forgives his mother when he finds out that his parents reunited for his happiness and to give their relationship a second chance. In season 2, Rocket is suspended by the Galactik Soccar League due to using his flux (The Breath) outside of the Galactik Soccar games, but only to save Tia's life. He eventually leaves the team but goes to play Netherball, which is offered by Sinedd. Despite the Galactik Soccar League, later in season 2, allowing Rocket back to the Snow Kids, he refuses to come back because he wants to continue to play Tetherball. However, Tia beats him and they both quit Netherball and return to the Snow Kids. In season 3, Rocket becomes the Snow Kids' coach when Aarch leaves them for some time. In the series, Rocket develops a relationship with Tia and they eventually date. Rocket is seen to be shy at the beginning of the series. He is seen to be ambitious and intelligent, as he always has strategies to help the Snow Kids win their matches. Rocket is tall and has long brown hair (in season 2 he keeps his hair in a ponytail). He wears jersey number 5 and plays in midfield.
- Tia is the daughter of the Obia Moon ambassador. In season 1, she secretly runs away to Akillian in order to try out on Aarch's team. She meets Rocket when her spaceship crashes and Rocket agrees to take her to the tryouts. However, her parents take her back to Obia Moon as they do not want their daughter to play Soccar, but later agree with her decision. Tia was the first one out of the Snow Kids to already have The Breath. During the Snow Kids' match against the Wombat Tia gets attacked by Wooamboo, in order to prevent the Snow Kids from winning. In season 2, Tia was about to fall off a cliff but Rocket uses his Breath to save her and he gets suspended. Tia is upset about this and believes it was her fault. She tries her best to bring back Rocket and blames D'Jok for doing nothing. She later beats Rocket in Netherball in the hope to bring him back to the Snow Kids, after the Galactik Soccar League allows him back to the team. Tia during the GFC tournament leaves the Snow Kids for a while to save her parents in prison with the help of Sonny Blackbones and his team. Yuki had to take her place during Ryker's match. In season 3, Tia becomes the team captain when D'Jok leaves the team. She also gets jealous of Lun Zia because Tia thinks that she likes Rocket, but later finds out that Lun Zia already has a boyfriend. Tia is seen to be shy and caring. She used to carry a camera with her in season 1. She is in a relationship with Rocket and would do anything for him. Tia in season 1 becomes best friends with Mei. She even supported Mei in season 3, during her relationship with Sinedd. Tia has blond hair and green eyes. She wears jersey number 4 and plays in midfield.
- Micro-Ice is the joker of the team. He is best friends with D'Jok, Thran, and Ahito. He also becomes best friends with Mark in season 2, and the two make fun of each other. In season 1, Micro-Ice was not concerned about making it to the Snow Kids, but after the tryouts, he gets happy about this. He had a crush on Mei but gets upset and leaves when he finds out that Mei likes D'Jok. However, Micro-Ice returns to the team, after D'Jok said in an interview that the team is missing Micro-Ice. Micro-Ice was the last one to develop The Breath. He later on also has a crush on a girl named Zoelene. In season 2, Micro-Ice begins to develop a relationship with Yuki. In season 3, they break up because Yuki leaves the Snow Kids for the Elektras. Although, Micro-Ice is seen to reunite with Zoelene. At the end of season 3, Micro-Ice, Mei, and a group of kids GF learners (taught by D'Jok) disappear after their training session failed, due to a breakout. Micro-Ice is seen to be a chilled-back guy and a good dancer. He also hates Sinedd, but in season 3 begins to get along with him. His mother Mama-Ice works in a café on Akillian. There has been no mention of his father. In season 2 and season 3, Micro-Ice advertises his drink Mice Delight. Micro-Ice has black hair and silver eyes and wears jersey number 3. He plays the striker position.
- Mei, in season 1, is told by her mother to become a supermodel and to use her GF career to force her to go into the fashion industry. Mei follows her mother's advice, and she begins to flirt with D'Jok to get Micro-Ice jealous and take his position as a striker. However, she goes back to playing as a defender. But later on, Micro-Ice tells Mei to stand up for herself and she tells her mother that she wants to be a Galactik Soccar player. She wears the jersey number 7.
- Thran is Ahito's brother. He is best friends with Micro-ice and D'Jok. Thran is a defender of the Snow Kids. He is one of the few characters that does not seem to have gotten into arguments with anyone due to his likable and cheerful nature. In season 1 he appears to be the smartest Snow Kid and shows interest in technology and gaming. He helps Clamp with his gadgets and can be seen playing games together. Thran also has invented a Soccar with a device that reads the speed in which it is kicked at. He is a great hacker as seen in "The Escape" where he helps Sonny Blackbones and Micro-Ice escape Akillian using blueprints of the ventilation system he had acquired. In season 2 tries to support his brother through the illness that developed. When the illness often affected his brother's strength and skills Thran tried to protect him and helped him hide it. He also spends his time supporting his cousin Yuki as she tries to fit in with the team. In season 3 Thran is still the same cheerful boy and he is more passionate about new technologies. He was smuggled in a pirate shuttle back on Paradisia with Clamp and helped prevent the ship from exploding in the middle of the Galaxy.
- Ahito is a goalkeeper for the Snow Kids and twin brother to Thran. Just prior to the beginning of season two, Ahito is struck down by a sudden illness, which caused him to collapse while training. He returns home to Akillian to recuperate, where he is rehabilitated with the help of Dame Simbai. At Thran's suggestion, his cousin Yuki replaces him as the goalkeeper. Aarch During The Homecoming, the rest of the team pays a visit to Akillian and he is able to return to Genesis Stadium with them. His return to play in the second half of the Final 16 match against the Wambas', inspires his flagging team to victory. He continues to play in the quarter and semi-final matches, but has to conceal his illness from his coach and team, even going so far as to make Thran promise not to tell Aarch. During the final of the Galactik Soccar Cup, the same illness begins to affect Ahito, causing him to make mistakes. Finally, he is forced to admit his illness to Aarch and asks to be removed from play. In season three, it was revealed Ahito has the ability to absorb flux and control it, which was the cause of his illness in season two. After training with Dame Simbai, this saves them when the Breath is lost and he absorbs essence from the Multi-flux and spreads it around the team that allows them to win.
- Clamp (also once known as Yarrit Labnor) is the technical advisor for the Snow Kids and one of the creators of The Metaflux.
- Dame Simbai is the medic for Snow Kids and an undercover agent for The Flux Society. She is an old friend of Aarch and acts as a motherly influence to the team and a good mentor, she cares deeply for the players well-being.
- Aarch is Akillian's former star player and now the founder and coach of the Snow Kids. He is the brother of Norata, the uncle of Rocket, and the love interest of Galactik Soccar League President Adium. As a coach, Aarch shows a tough but fair attitude towards his team but is generally kind and admiring of his player's talents. He shows no favoritism and tends to make the better choice for the team. He is never usually put down by the attitudes of other people such as Artegor who constantly mocked him in the first season. Aarch usually remains calm in stressful situations however if something appears that could lower the chance of winning, he usually gets stern and shouts but (mostly) for all the right reasons. He also shows a large amount of care for his player's well-being such as when Rocket disappeared in The Storm and when he left to play Tetherball. Akillian's greatest player, Aarch is a Soccaring legend to the Soccar fans of Planet Akillian. He first started his athletic career in midfield offense as Striker for Planet Akilian and captained the last team to play under the Akillian colors before the Great Ice Age. He was also the last person to use the Breath of Akillian before its disappearance, using the Breath at the moment of the Meta-Flux explosion. The explosion devastated Akillian, causing a huge avalanche to fall upon the stadium. Although not all of the casualties were listed, Norata, Aarch's brother, lost his left leg in the catastrophe. Akillian's axis shifted, bringing about an Ice Age and causing Akillian's flux, The Breath, to vanish. After the onset of the Ice Age Aarch and his best friend Artegor was invited to join team Shadow. He left Akillian to pursue his Soccar career, abandoning his girlfriend and fellow player Adium as well as the injured Norata in the process. Among the Shadows the two players absorbed the team's flux and were able to play with the Smog, allowing Aarch to regain and even exceed his previous abilities. However, during a match against Team Cyclops Aarch lost control of the Smog and collapsed. Realizing that the Smog was making him sick and that his life was in danger he decided to leave Team Shadow, an act which caused a rift between himself and Artegor that ended their friendship. He was sent to the Wamba's home planet, where he recovered slowly in the care of a medic, Dame Simbai. What he did in the years after his recovery is unknown, but at some point, he encountered Professor Clamp, a robotics expert, and engineer, who encouraged him to return to Akillian and pursue his dream of reviving the planet Akilian's once-great Soccar team. Aarch's arrival on Akillian was met with mixed reactions, especially by those who felt he had abandoned them years before. The younger generation, however, were thrilled to meet their sporting hero and many turned up to try out for Aarch's team. From this, Aarch picked a group of seven, which soon increased to eight with the addition of his nephew Rocket. He renovated the old Akillian stadium and turns it into Aarch Academy, where with Professor Clamp as an engineer and later Dame Simbai as the team's medic, the Snow Kids were coached.

== Teams ==
- Team Paradisia: Lord Phoenix's team, who organized the league in Season 3. The team uses Multi-Flux. Multi-Flux was acquired from Bleylock by Harris in Season 2. Flux tubes were used for this. The team's players are Cyborgs (Robots). D'Jok captained Paradisia Team in Season 3 until the end of the Paradisian tournament. Their captain is Nikki 4.
- The Electras: Their flux is the Hectonian Wave. They can create high waves with water and surpass their opponents. They are composed of girls. Their captain is Zyria.
- The Shadows: One of the most feared teams, capable of transforming into mist and stealing balls this way. Fifteen years ago, in the match where the explosion occurred, the Shadows were playing against Akillian's team. Their captain is Sinedd.
- The Pirates: The team that plays fair, and can evade the Technoids. They are led by Sonny Blackbones. Their captain is Stevens.
- The Rykers: A team that has mutated and adapted to its state. A team that plays well but can scream terribly when they lose. Their screams can push the opponent away. Although their players aren't male, they have muscles all over their bodies and are very heavy. Their captain is Kernor.
- The Technodroids: A team made up of robots that can jump very high and move very fast. Their arms and legs can rotate, but not themselves.
- The Wambas: A team that lives on a jungle planet, jumps very high and can make long passes. Their captain is Woo-Wamboo.
- The Red Tigers: Another Akillian team. They mock the other team when they win. They are made up of Akillians. In season 3, the entire team has the Breath of Akillian.
- The Cyclops: A team that can read the other team's mind and play accordingly.
- The Lightnings: The tournament's most respected and favorite team. They were supposed to have the cup, but the Snow Kids won. They have the ability to hit the ball very fast and teleport. Their captain is Warren.
- Xenons: One of the teams with the strongest fluxes in the galaxy. Their flux can even cross the field, immobilizing players. Their flux make them even faster than other fluxes. Their flux are so fast that they had to watch Luur's moves in slow motion during the season 2 All-Star Game. Their captain is Luur.
- The Snow Kids: The first and only team in the galaxy to win three consecutive championships. They are a favorite and star of Galactik Football fans. They can perform accurate shots, passes, and crosses with their breath. They are very young and fast. Their captains are Rocket in season 1, D'jok in season 2, and Tia in season 3.
- The Gyras: A mentioned-only team the third season of the series. They were eliminated in the round of 16 of the Genesis Tournament, losing 3–0 to the Shadows. It is unknown what type of flux they poss and there are no known players from this team.
- The Pullsars: A mentioned-only team in the third season of the series. They were eliminated in the first round after losing to The Sandmen of Menor in the Paradisia Tournament and to the Thunderbolts in the Genesis Tournament. It is unknown what type of flux they poss and there are no known players from this team. Based on their crest and name, it's assumed that they are a reptilian (like Xenons) or a dynosaur based team.
- The Sandmen of Menor: A mentioned-only team in the third season of the series. They were eliminated by either Elektras or the Shadows in the Paradisia Tournament, and were eliminated by Elektras in the Genesis Tournament. It is unknown what type of flux they poss and there are no known players from this team. Based on their crest and name, it is assumed that they live on a desert planet.
- Galactik Kids (or Club Galactik): It is a club created by D'Jok to train the future stars of Galactik Football. Soon after forming it, Warren joins him and helps him train them. Their training site is in Genesis Forest. In The Stars of Akillian Are Eternal, they become a part of the Snow Kids when they mysteriously disappear in the Holotraining Cube along with Micro-Ice, Mei and Hush Sharky, who had snuck in to record their playing.
- Stars: A team composed of star players from the best teams in Galactic Football. Their coach is Rocket's uncle, Aarch.
