= The Wind That Shakes the Barley (film) =

2006 film by Ken Loach

- Theatrical release poster
- Directed by: Ken Loach
- Written by: Paul Laverty
- Produced by: Rebecca O'Brien
- Starring: Cillian Murphy; Liam Cunningham; Pádraic Delaney; Orla Fitzgerald
- Cinematography: Barry Ackroyd
- Edited by: Jonathan Morris
- Music by: George Fenton
- Production companies: Sixteen Films; Matador Pictures
- Distributed by: Element Pictures (Ireland); Pathé Distribution (United Kingdom); BIM Distribuzione (Italy); Neue Visionen Filmverleih (Germany); Diaphana Films (France); Alta Films (Spain)
- Release dates: 18 May 2006 (Cannes); 23 June 2006 (UK & IRL)
- Running time: 126 minutes
- Countries: Ireland; United Kingdom; Italy; Germany; Spain
- Languages: English; Irish; Latin
- Budget: €6.5 million ($8.3 million)
- Box office: $25.7 million

The Wind That Shakes the Barley is a 2006 war drama film directed by Ken Loach, set during the Irish War of Independence (1919–1921) and the Irish Civil War (1922–1923). Written by Loach's long-time collaborator Paul Laverty, it tells the fictional story of two County Cork brothers, Damien (Cillian Murphy) and Teddy O'Donovan (Pádraic Delaney), who join the Irish Republican Army to fight for Irish independence from the United Kingdom, only for the two brothers to then find themselves on opposite sides during the subsequent Irish Civil War.

It takes its title from Robert Dwyer Joyce's "The Wind That Shakes the Barley", a song set during the 1798 rebellion in Ireland and featured early in the film.

Widely praised, the film won the Palme d'Or at the 2006 Cannes Film Festival. Loach's biggest box office success as of 2007, the film did well around the world and set a record in Ireland as the highest-grossing Irish-made independent film, until surpassed by The Guard in 2011.

== Plot ==
In County Cork in Ireland, in 1920, Damien O'Donovan is about to leave his native village to practice medicine in a London hospital. Meanwhile, his brother Teddy commands the local flying column of the Irish Republican Army. After a hurling match, Damien witnesses the summary execution of his friend Micheál Ó Súilleabháin, by British Black and Tans, for refusing to say his name in English and punching an officer. Although shaken, Damien rebuffs his friends' entreaties to stay in Ireland and join the IRA, saying that the war is unwinnable. As he is leaving town, Damien witnesses the British Army vainly trying to intimidate a railway employee for refusing to permit the troops to board. In response, Damien decides to stay and is sworn into Teddy's IRA brigade.

After drilling in the mountains, the column raids the village's Royal Irish Constabulary barracks to acquire more arms, then uses them to assassinate four Auxiliaries. In the aftermath, Anglo-Irish landowner Sir John Hamilton coerces one of his servants, IRA member Chris Reilly, into passing information to the British Army's Intelligence Corps. As a result, the entire brigade is arrested. In their cell, Damien meets the train driver, Dan, a union official who shares Damien's socialist views.

Meanwhile, British officers interrogate Teddy, pulling out his fingernails when he refuses to give them the names of IRA members. Johnny Gogan, a British soldier of Irish descent, helps the prisoners escape, but three are left behind. After the actions of Sir John and Chris are revealed to the IRA's intelligence network, both are taken hostage. As Teddy is still recovering, Damien is temporarily placed in command. News arrives that the three remaining IRA prisoners have been tortured and shot. Simultaneously, the brigade receives orders to "execute the spies".

Even though Chris is a lifelong friend, Damien shoots both him and Sir John. Later, the IRA ambushes and wipes out a convoy of the Auxiliary Division, though Gogan dies as the IRA's sole casualty. Shortly after, another detachment of Auxiliaries loots and burns the farmhouse of Damien's sweetheart, Cumann na mBan member Sinéad Sullivan. Sinéad is held at gunpoint while her head is roughly shorn, her scalp being wounded in the process. Later, as Damien treats her, a messenger arrives with news of a formal ceasefire between Britain and the IRA.

After the Anglo-Irish Treaty is signed, the brigade learns that a partitioned Ireland will only be granted Dominion status within the British Empire. As a result, the brigade divides over accepting the terms of the Treaty. Teddy and his allies argue that accepting the Treaty will bring peace now while further gains can be made later. Others oppose the Treaty, proposing to continue fighting until a united Irish Republic can be obtained. Dan and Damien further demand the collectivisation of industry and agriculture. Any other course, declares Dan, will change only "the accents of the powerful and the colour of the flag".

Soon the Irish Free State replaces British rule, and Teddy and his allies begin patrolling in National Army uniforms. Meanwhile, Damien, Dan, and their allies join the Anti-Treaty IRA. When the Battle of Dublin launches the Irish Civil War, Anti-Treaty IRA led by Rory, a former member of O'Donovan's column, commence guerrilla warfare against Free State forces. Damien and Dan soon join up with Rory's contingent. As the violence escalates, Teddy expresses fear that the British will invade if the republicans gain the upper hand. His position is: "They take one out, we take one back. To hell with the courts."

During a raid for arms on an Irish Army barracks commanded by Teddy, Dan is killed and Damien is captured. Sentenced to execution, Damien is held in the same cell where the British Army imprisoned them earlier. Desperate to avoid executing his brother, Teddy pleads with Damien to reveal where the Anti-Treaty IRA is hiding the stolen rifles and to give up Rory's location. In return, Teddy offers Damien full amnesty, a life with Sinéad, and the vision of an Ireland where Pro- and Anti-Treaty Irishmen can raise families side by side. Insulted, Damien responds by saying that he will never "sell out" the Republic the way Chris Reilly did and Teddy leaves the cell in tears. Damien writes a goodbye letter to Sinéad, expressing his love for her, and quoting Dan's words: "It's easy to know what you're against, quite another to know what you're for". But he says that he knows what he stands for and is not afraid to die for it and tells Sinéad to look after Teddy. At dawn, Damien dies before a firing squad commanded by a heartbroken yet obstinate Teddy. Teddy delivers Damien's letter to Sinéad who is distraught and heartbroken. She attacks Teddy and orders him to leave her land.

== Main cast ==
- Cillian Murphy as Damien O'Donovan
- Pádraic Delaney as Teddy O'Donovan
- Liam Cunningham as Dan
- Orla Fitzgerald as Sinéad Ní Shúilleabháin
- Laurence Barry as Micheál Ó Súilleabháin
- Mary Murphy as Bernadette
- Mary O'Riordan as Peggy
- Myles Horgan as Rory
- Martin Lucey as Congo
- Roger Allam as Sir John Hamilton
- John Crean as Chris Reilly
- Damien Kearney as Finbar
- Frank Bourke as Leo
- Shane Casey as Kevin
- Máirtín de Cógáin as Sean
- William Ruane as Johnny Gogan
- Fiona Lawton as Lily
- Seán McGinley as Father Denis
- Kevin O'Brien as Tim
- Siobhán McSweeney (credited as Sabrina Barry) as Julia

== Production ==
The film stars mostly Irish actors and was made by British director Ken Loach. It is an international co-production between companies in Ireland, United Kingdom, Germany, Italy and Spain.

The title derives from the song of the same name, "The Wind That Shakes the Barley", by 19th-century author Robert Dwyer Joyce. The song made the phrase "the wind that shakes the barley" a motif in Irish republican song and poetry. Loach took some of the inspiration for Damian's character from the memoirs of republican leader Ernie O'Malley. University College Cork historian Dr. Donal Ó Drisceoil was Loach's historical adviser on the film.

The film was shot in various towns within County Cork during 2005, including Ballyvourney and Timoleague. Some filming took place in Bandon, County Cork: a scene was shot along North Main Street and outside a building next to the Court House. The ambush scene was shot on the mountains around Ballyvourney while the farmhouse scenes were filmed in Coolea. Damien's execution scene was shot at Kilmainham Gaol in Dublin, where many leaders of Irish rebellions were imprisoned and some executed by the British and latterly in 1923 by the Irish Free State.

A number of the extras in the film were drawn from local Scout groups, including from Bandon, Togher and Macroom.

Among the songs on the film's soundtrack is "Óró sé do bheatha abhaile", a 17th-century Irish Jacobite song whose lyrics the nationalist leader Pádraig Pearse changed to focus upon republican themes.

=== Soundtrack ===
- "The Wind That Shakes the Barley" - Traditional, words by Robert Dwyer Joyce
- "Amhrán na bhFiann" ("A Soldier's Song") - Traditional, words by Peadar Kearney and Patrick Heeney
- "Oró! Sé Do Bheatha 'Bhaile" – Traditional, words by Pádraic Pearse
- "The Doon Reel" – Traditional, arranged by the performers

== Release ==
=== Distribution ===
The commercial interest expressed in the UK was initially much lower than in other European countries and only 30 prints of the film were planned for distribution in the United Kingdom, compared with 300 in France. However, after the Palme d'Or award the film appeared on 105 screens across Great Britain and Northern Ireland. The Respect Party, on whose national council Ken Loach was at the time, called for people to watch the film on its first weekend in order to persuade the film industry to show the film in more cinemas.

== Themes ==
According to Loach, the film attempts to explore the extent that the Irish revolution was a social revolution as opposed to a nationalist revolution. Loach commented on this theme in an interview with Eye Weekly (15 March 2007):

Every time a colony wants independence, the questions on the agenda are: a) how do you get the imperialists out, and b) what kind of society do you build? There are usually the bourgeois nationalists who say, 'Let's just change the flag and keep everything as it was.' Then there are the revolutionaries who say, 'Let's change the property laws.' It's always a critical moment.

According to Rebecca O'Brien, producer of the film and a longtime Loach collaborator:

It's about the civil war in microcosm ... It's not a story like Michael Collins. It's not seeking that sort of biographical accuracy, but rather will express the themes of the period. This is the core of the later Troubles, which is why it's so fascinating to make.

Drawing a contrast between the film and 1996's Michael Collins, Mark Kermode observed that "On one level, The Wind That Shakes the Barley presents the flipside of Neil Jordan's more mainstream Michael Collins, viewing the creation of the Irish Free State through the eyes of an idealist socialist rather than a mystical romanticist."

In September 2006, History Ireland wrote that Loach was "guided by his view that it was the Democratic Programme of the First Dáil that informed the social thinking of the revolution."

Speaking at an Irish Presidential event on Irish film in 2022, Lelia Doolan described The Wind that Shakes the Barley as "unapologetically socialist," noting that "in one scene at Mass, the priest thunders the bishops’ belief in the virtues of the Treaty and its promise of peace – against the leftwing obduracy of the anti-Treaty attitude – 'I suppose next ye’ll want to nationalise the twelve apostles!'"

== Reception ==
The Wind That Shakes the Barley became the most popular independent Irish film ever released in Ireland, earning €377,000 in its opening weekend and €2.7 million by August 2006.

It received positive reviews from film critics. As of 2025, the review aggregator Rotten Tomatoes reported that 90% of critics gave the film positive reviews, based on 116 reviews – with an average rating of 7.7/10. The website's critical consensus reads, "Bleak and uncompromising, but director Ken Loach brightens his film with gorgeous cinematography and tight pacing, and features a fine performance from Cillian Murphy". Metacritic reported the film had an average score of 82 out of 100, based on 30 reviews.

The Daily Telegraph's film critic described it as a "brave, gripping drama" and said that director Loach was "part of a noble and very English tradition of dissent". A Times film critic said that it showed Loach "at his creative and inflammatory best", and rated it as 4 out of 5. The Daily Record of Scotland gave it a positive review (4 out of 5), describing it as "a dramatic, thought-provoking, gripping tale that, at the very least, encourages audiences to question what has been passed down in dusty history books."

Michael Sragow of The Baltimore Sun named it the 5th best film of 2007, and Stephen Hunter of The Washington Post named it the 7th best film of 2007.

Jim Emerson, Roger Ebert's editor, gave the film a 4-star review, calling it "breathtakingly authentic", and declared it ranked "among the best war films ever made." In a generally positive review, the Irish historian Brian Hanley suggested that the film might have dealt with the IRA's relationship with the Protestant community, as one scene in its screenplay did.

The film also revived debate on rival interpretations of Irish history.

In 2024 a study commissioned by Betfair Casino, combining ratings from IMDb, Metacritic and Rotten Tomatoes, placed The Wind that Shakes the Barley as Murphy's second-most-popular film performance.

== Awards and nominations ==
Award	Category	Name	Outcome
British Independent Film Awards	Best Actor	Cillian Murphy	Nominated
British Independent Film Awards	Best British Independent Film		Nominated
British Independent Film Awards	Best Director	Ken Loach	Nominated
British Independent Film Awards	Best Technical Achievement	Barry Ackroyd	Nominated
Cannes Film Festival	Palme d'Or	Ken Loach	Won
European Film Awards	Best Cinematographer	Barry Ackroyd	Won
European Film Awards	Best Actor	Cillian Murphy	Nominated
European Film Awards	Best Director	Ken Loach	Nominated
European Film Awards	Best Film		Nominated
European Film Awards	Best Screenwriter	Paul Laverty	Nominated
Goya Awards	Best European Film	Ken Loach	Nominated
Irish Film & Television Awards	Best Irish Film (Audience Award)		Won
Irish Film & Television Awards	Best Actor in a Supporting Role in a Feature Film	Liam Cunningham	Won
Irish Film & Television Awards	Best Film	Ken Loach	Won
Irish Film & Television Awards	Best Actor in a Lead Role in a Feature Film	Cillian Murphy	Nominated
Irish Film & Television Awards	Best Actor in a Supporting Role in a Feature Film	Pádraic Delaney	Nominated
Irish Film & Television Awards	Best Actress in a Supporting Role in a Feature Film	Orla Fitzgerald	Nominated
Irish Film & Television Awards	Breakthrough Talent (actor)	Pádraic Delaney	Nominated
Irish Film & Television Awards	Breakthrough Talent (actress)	Orla Fitzgerald	Nominated
London Critics Circle Film Awards	British Director of the Year	Ken Loach	Nominated
London Critics Circle Film Awards	British Film of the Year		Nominated
London Critics Circle Film Awards	British Producer of the Year	Rebecca O'Brien	Nominated
Polish Film Awards	Best European Film	Ken Loach	Nominated
Satellite Awards	Best Original Screenplay	Paul Laverty	Nominated

== See also ==
- Cinema of Ireland
- List of 2006 films based on actual events
