= Pádraic Delaney =

Irish actor (b.1977)

- Born: 6 November 1977 (age 48); Adamstown, County Wexford, Ireland
- Education: Trinity College Dublin (BA)
- Occupation: Actor

Pádraic Delaney (born 6 November 1977) is an Irish actor known for playing Teddy O'Donovan in the Ken Loach film The Wind That Shakes the Barley, for which he earned an IFTA nomination as well as being named Irish Shooting Star for the 2007 Berlin Film Festival. In addition, he is known for his role as English aristocrat Lord George Boleyn, brother-in-law of King Henry VIII of England in Showtime's The Tudors.

== Early life ==
Delaney was born to parents Sheelagh and Michael Delaney. He has three older brothers Philip, Conor and Emmett, and two younger sisters Tracey and Gemma. He attended Colaiste Abbain Secondary School in Adamstown, County Wexford. He originally studied engineering before dropping out after four months. He later went on to study at the Beckett Centre at Trinity College Dublin and graduated with a Bachelor of Arts degree in drama and theatre studies in 2001.

== Career ==
He first started acting in theatre, performing in Hamlet, The Madman and the Nun, A Midsummer Night's Dream and The Hollow in the Sand. Delaney soon added screen acting to his resume, starring in the 2003 short film An Cuainín, and in 2005 appearing in the Irish television series Pure Mule and The Clinic. He went on to play the lead in the RTÉ series Legend.

It was in 2006 that he first appeared before international audiences as Irish revolutionary Teddy O'Donovan in Ken Loach's The Wind That Shakes the Barley, opposite Cillian Murphy. The film won the Palme D'Or at the 2006 Cannes Film Festival, and Delaney was nominated for two 2007 Irish Film and Television Awards: Best Actor in a Supporting Role and Breakthrough Talent. Delaney was also honoured as the Irish Shooting Star for 2007 by the Berlin International Film Festival.

Delaney was a cast member of the Showtime series The Tudors in which he plays Anne Boleyn's brother George alongside Jonathan Rhys Meyers as King Henry VIII.

In late 2007, Delaney appeared on stage at the Tricycle Theatre in the role of Father Flynn in John Patrick Shanley's play Doubt: A Parable.

He was reunited with Cillian Murphy and Liam Cunningham in 2009, his co-stars in The Wind That Shakes The Barley, for the comedy Perriers Bounty.

In 2010, he filmed the role of Sundance in the western Blackthorn alongside Sam Shepard, Eduardo Noriega, Stephen Rea and Nikolaj Coster-Waldau.

Between 2013 and 2014, he starred in Martin McDonagh's dark comedy play The Cripple of Inishmaan alongside Daniel Radcliffe, which started out in London's West End and then transferred to Broadway.

In 2015, he starred alongside Dev Patel and Jeremy Irons in The Man Who Knew Infinity. Delaney acted in Jeremy Renner's Knightfall, which aired in 2017.

== Personal life ==
Delaney lives in London, England.

== Filmography ==
=== Film ===
| Year | Title | Role | Notes |
|---|---|---|---|
| 2006 | The Wind That Shakes The Barley | Teddy O'Donovan | |
| 2008 | Eden | Eoghan | |
| 2009 | Perrier's Bounty | Shamie | |
| 2011 | Isztambul | András, Zsófi férje | |
| 2011 | Blackthorn | Sundance | |
| 2012 | What Richard Did | Pat Kilroy | |
| 2013 | Dark Touch | Lucas Galin | |
| 2015 | The Man Who Knew Infinity | Beglan | |
| 2018 | The Witness | Vince Harrington | |
| 2021 | Seacole | William Russell | |
| 2023 | Freud's Last Session | Warren Lewis | |

=== Television ===
| Year | Title | Role | Notes |
|---|---|---|---|
| 2005 | Pure Mule | Maurice | 2 episodes |
| 2005 | The Clinic | Andrew McLoughlin | Episode #3.7 |
| 2006 | Legend | Fred 'Fridge' Gogan | 6 episodes |
| 2007–2008 | The Tudors | George Boleyn | 16 episodes |
| 2009 | Single-Handed | Michael Casey | 2 episodes |
| 2010 | When Harvey Met Bob | Andy Zweck | Television film |
| 2010–2011 | Raw | Ray Cronin | 6 episodes |
| 2013 | The Siege 1922 | Padraig O'Connor | Television film |
| 2017–2019 | Knightfall | Gawain | 18 episodes |
