= Chris Walley (actor) =

Irish actor (born 1995)

- Born: 21 June 1995 (age 31); County Cork, Ireland
- Education: Royal Academy of Dramatic Art
- Occupation: Actor
- Years active: 2016–present
- Television: The Young Offenders
- Relatives: William Norton (great-grandfather)

Chris Walley (born 21 June 1995) is an Irish actor. He is best known for his role as Jock O'Keeffe in the comedy film The Young Offenders (2016), for which he won an IFTA Award, and its subsequent RTÉ and BBC Three series. He won a Laurence Olivier Award for his performance in The Lieutenant of Inishmore revival on the West End.

== Early life ==
Walley was born in County Cork, Ireland, and raised in the area of Glanmire. He was privately educated at Christian Brothers College, Cork. He is a great-grandson of William Norton, former Tánaiste.

From an early age, Walley took an interest in Drama and Theatre studies, attending classes in the Gaiety School of Acting and the Cork School of Music. As a student in the Cork School of Music, Walley was a member of their Youth Theatre group, performing in productions such as Anouilh's Antigone, as well as undertaking individual lessons under the tutelage of Trína Scott. Walley auditioned for the Royal Academy of Dramatic Art in London after completing his secondary education, however, he was unsuccessful in his application and instead began studying full-time at Cork School of Music as part of their BA in Drama and Theatre studies. The following year Walley re-auditioned for RADA, and was offered one of their coveted 28 places, ahead of 3,500 other applicants.

== Career ==
Prior to commencing third level education, Walley had auditioned for and won a role in an independent Irish film, set to be based and filmed locally in Cork. The resulting film, The Young Offenders, written and directed by Peter Foott, became the fastest Irish film to break the €1 million mark at the Irish box office in 2016. For his role as Jock, Walley was nominated for numerous awards, including the IFTA for Best Supporting Actor. With the popularity of the film, on 9 May 2017, it was confirmed that a six-episode television programme, based on the film with the same name, had been ordered by RTÉ. The first series began broadcasting on 1 February 2018, broadcast by RTÉ Two in Ireland and airing through the online television service BBC Three. With a popular and high reception, the series was recommissioned for a second series, the projected release date was not disclosed. For his role in the television series, Walley was awarded the IFTA for Best Male Performance - Television.

In 2018, Walley was cast alongside Aidan Turner in a revival of Martin McDonagh's play The Lieutenant of Inishmore, which opened at the Noël Coward Theatre in June of that year. For his performance, Walley received exceptional reviews, with Time Out London writing, "in a uniformly strong cast, special praise should go to Walley. A virtual newcomer, he is excruciatingly brilliant as the mullet-clad Davey, who meets each new indignity heaped upon him with an impressive mix of resignation and hysteria", Broadway World saying that, "you would never be able to guess this is his West End debut", and The New York Times stating, "Chris Walley ... effortlessly conveys the illogical logic and perverse mundanity of the dialogue". For this performance Walley was nominated for the Evening Standard Emerging Talent Award, and was selected as a BAFTA Breakthrough Brit, an initiative established by the British Academy of Film and Television Awards to foster the talents of up-and-coming members of the arts world by offering them mentorship for a year.

== Personal life ==
Walley currently lives in London but he would go back to Ireland "as much as [he] can". He is close friends with fellow actor and Cork-native Éanna Hardwicke, having known one another through performing in youth theatres in their teens. He has named Gary Oldman, Peter O’Toole, and Richard Harris as his favourite actors.

== Filmography ==
=== Film ===
Year	Title	Role	Directed by	Notes
2016	The Young Offenders	Jock Murphy	Peter Foott	
2019	1917	Private Bullen	Sam Mendes	
2020	Pixie	Daniel Donnelly	Barnaby Thompson	
2020	Spanish Pigeon	John	Stefan J Fideli & Philip Barantini	Short film
2023	Unwelcome	Killian	Jon Wright	
2023	The Last Voyage of the Demeter	Abrams	André Øvredal	a.k.a. Dracula: Voyage of the Demeter
2023	Lies We Tell	Edward	Lisa Mulcahy	
2024	Peat	Petey Byrne	Padraig Baggott	Short film
2025	Christy	Trevor	Brendan Canty	

=== Television ===
Year	Title	Role	Notes
2018–2026	The Young Offenders	Jock O'Keeffe	Main cast
2021–2022	Bloodlands	Birdy	Main cast
2023	Falling for the Life of Alex Whelan	Alex Whelan	Television film
2024	Bodkin	Seán O'Shea	Main cast

=== Stage ===
Year	Title	Role	Theatre	Ref(s)
2018	The Lieutenant of Inishmore	Davey	Noël Coward Theatre	
2023	Portia Coughlan	Raphael Coughlan	Almeida Theatre	
2024	The Sugar Wife	Alfred Darby	The Abbey	
2024	Juno and the Paycock	Charles Bentham	Gielgud Theatre	
2026	Orphans	Treat	Jermyn Street Theatre	
2026	Archduke	Nedeljko	The Royal Court	

== Awards and nominations ==
Year	Work	Award	Result	Notes
2016	The Young Offenders	Súil Eile Award	Won	Shared with Alex Murphy
2016	The Young Offenders	Ros Hubbard Award for Acting	Won	Shared with Alex Murphy
2017	The Young Offenders	IFTA Best Actor in a Leading Role – Film	Nominated	
2018	The Young Offenders	IFTA Best Male Performance – Television	Won	
2018	The Lieutenant of Inishmore & The Young Offenders	BAFTA Breakthrough Brit	Won	
2018	The Lieutenant of Inishmore	Evening Standard Theatre Award for Emerging Talent	Nominated	
2018	The Lieutenant of Inishmore	Critics' Circle Theatre Award for Most Promising Newcomer	Won	
2019	The Lieutenant of Inishmore	Laurence Olivier Award for Best Actor in a Supporting Role	Won	
2019	The Young Offenders	Royal Television Society Awards Comedy Performance - Male	Nominated	Shared with Alex Murphy
2024	Lies We Tell	IFTA Supporting Actor – Film	Nominated	
