= Shane Casey (actor) =

Irish actor

- Born: 1980 (age 45–46); Cork, Ireland
- Occupations: Actor and playwright
- Years active: 2005–present
- Website: shanecasey.ie

Shane Casey (born 1980) is an Irish actor and playwright. He is best known for playing the role of Billy Murphy, debuting in the film The Young Offenders, and the following TV series of the same name, The Young Offenders.

== Early life ==
Casey grew up in the Turners Cross area of Cork City. He dropped out of school aged 16 to pursue an apprenticeship. He is also a supporter of the Liverpool Football Club and Celtic Football Club.

== Career ==
Aged 21, Casey decided to give up his position as an apprentice painter/decorator and become an actor.

Casey appeared in 2006 in The Wind That Shakes the Barley. His major breakthrough came in 2016, playing Billy Murphy, an unstable yet humorous Cork local, in the film The Young Offenders. In 2018 it was rebooted as a TV series, The Young Offenders, and Casey reprised his role.

He has written a play, Wet Paint, that has played at the Cork Opera House, Cork Arts Theatre and Everyman Palace Theatre. As a stage actor, Casey has participated in a number of stage plays, such as the role of Osric, an eccentric gossip blogger, in Hamlet: Cybermadness.

In 2026, Casey appeared as 'Mike' in the British horror short A Hand to Hold, which was selected for the 41st Santa Barbara International Film Festival and the 2026 FrightFest in Glasgow.
