= Dominic MacHale =

Irish actor

- Born: Ballintemple, Cork, Ireland
- Occupation: Actor
- Years active: 2015–present
- Known for: The Young Offenders

Dominic MacHale is an Irish actor. He is best known for his role as Sergeant Healy in the 2016 comedy film The Young Offenders. He went on to reprise his role in the 2018 television series of the same name, produced by the BBC. He started acting while working towards his BSc in Microbiology in University College Cork, which he gained in 2010. The Young Offenders was his first film role. Until then he had been mainly a theatre actor. His father is the academic Des MacHale.

== Filmography ==
=== Film ===
Year	Title	Role	Notes
2016	The Young Offenders	Sergeant Tony Healy	
2017	Fitzgibbons' Budget Funerals	Ken Fitzgibbon	Short
2021	Hoodwinkers	Mr Doyle	

=== Television ===
Year	Title	Role	Notes
2015	Ronanism	McPhun	2 episodes
2017	The School	Dominic English	3 episodes
2018–Present	The Young Offenders	Sergeant Tony Healy	29 episodes
