= Orla Fitzgerald =

Irish actress

- Born: 1978 (age 47–48)

Orla Fitzgerald is an Irish actress for stage and screen for over 25 years.

She received two nominations for Best Supporting Actress and Best Breakthrough Artist at the fourth annual Irish Film and Television Awards for her work as Sinéad Ní Shúilleabháin in Ken Loach's The Wind That Shakes the Barley. Fitzgerald was nominated best actress in the Irish Times Irish Theatre Awards (2013) for the role of Clare in Digging for Fire, written by Declan Hughes and directed by Matt Torney for Rough Magic. Most recently she has been embracing her Cork heritage in the role of Orla in The Young Offenders.

== Training and early career ==
Fitzgerald took drama classes in Crawford Art Gallery in Cork, placed there by her mother, who thought she was perhaps too shy. “It was a 90-minute workshop on a Saturday morning, where we did improv and plays. It was all about fun and being creative and I loved it,” the actress has said.

== Selected filmography ==
- Crossed Lines, 2001
- Strangers in the Night, 2002
- The Wind That Shakes the Barley, 2006
- Speed Dating, 2007
- The Guarantee, 2014

== TV work ==
- Love is the Drug, 2004
- The Baby Wars, 2005
- The Last Furlong, 2005
- Holby Blue, 2008
- Pure Mule: The Last Weekend, 2009
- Law & Order: UK, 2009
- The Young Offenders, 2018

== Selected stage career ==
- The Comedy of Errors, Royal Exchange, Manchester
- Crestfall, Theatre503, London
- Pumpgirl, Traverse Theatre, Edinburgh; 3 to 27 August 2006; Bush Theatre, London; 12 September to 14 October 2006
- This Ebony Bird, Blood in the Alley Theatre Company, Ballydehob, Ireland
- The System; The Project, Raw Productions, Dublin
- The Day I Swapped My Dad For Two Goldfish; The Ark, Dublin
- Playboy of the Western World; Royal Exchange, Manchester
- A Town Called F**cked; Last Serenade Theatre Company
- Macbeth; Second Age Theatre Company, Dublin
- A Quite Life; Peacock Theatre, Dublin
- The River; Meridian Theatre Company
- Who's Breaking?; Graffiti Theatre Company, Cork
- Laodamia; Merlin International Theatre, Budapest
- Disco Pigs; Corcadorca Theatre Company, Cork
- Othello; Everyman Theatre, Cork
- The Beauty Queen of Leenane; Lyric Theatre (Hammersmith), London (2021)

== Selected radio career ==
- Enda Walsh’s 4 Big Days in the Life of Dessie Banks
