= English Market =

Historic market in Cork city, Ireland

- Location: Between Grand Parade and Princes Street, Cork city, Ireland.; 51.898°N 8.474°W
- Opening date: 1788
- Owner: Cork City Council
- Goods sold: Food (primarily)
- Days normally open: Monday to Saturday
- Number of tenants: 130
- Website: corkcity.ie/en/english-market
- Interactive map of English Market

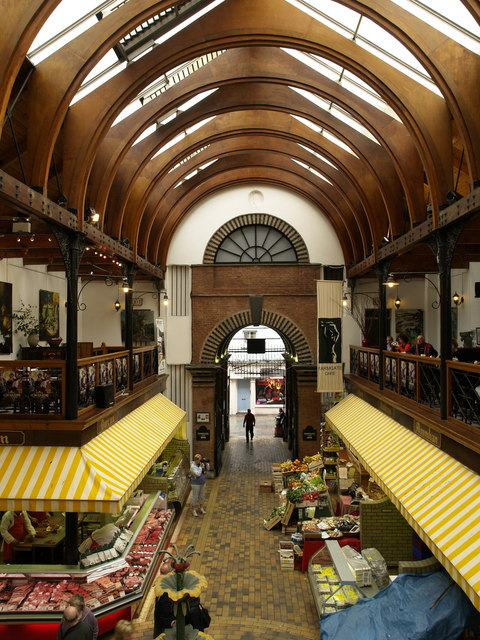
Princes Street entrance to the English Market

The English Market (Irish: An Margadh Sasanach) is a municipal food market in the centre of Cork city, Ireland. It stretches from Princes Street to the Grand Parade, and combines Princes Street Market and Grand Parade Market. The market is regarded for both its mid-19th century architecture and locally produced artisan food.

The market has become a tourist attraction, has developed an international reputation, and has been described by chef Rick Stein as the "best covered market in the UK and Ireland".

== History ==
The term English Market was coined in the 19th century to distinguish the market from the nearby St. Peter's Market (now the site of the Bodega on Cornmarket Street), which was known as the Irish Market. There has been a market on the present site since 1788 when it was opened as a meat shambles and known as "new markets". Its original structure is entirely lost. The market has been rebuilt in stages, including by John Benson and Robert Walker in the mid-19th century who constructed a front range, galleried court, and extended the footprint to the south end of Princes Street. Today the market centres around a cast iron fountain, and is typically entered via either a tripartite facade on Princes Street, or a bayed entrance from the Grand Parade. The market is known for its interior; which consists of a gabled central bay, central archways, and stained glass lunette windows. It was damaged during a 1981 fire, but is now fully restored.

Today's group of buildings were constructed in the mid-19th century with the ornamental entrance at Princes Street being constructed in 1862 by Sir John Benson. The market changed little over the next century or so until it was seriously damaged by fire on 19 June 1980 and had to be extensively refurbished by Cork City Council. The refurbishment work was done in sympathy with the original Victorian building's design and won a Gold Medal from the Europa Nostra heritage foundation for conservation shortly after its completion. The refurbished market suffered a second fire in 1986 but the fire was less damaging than the first.

== Today ==
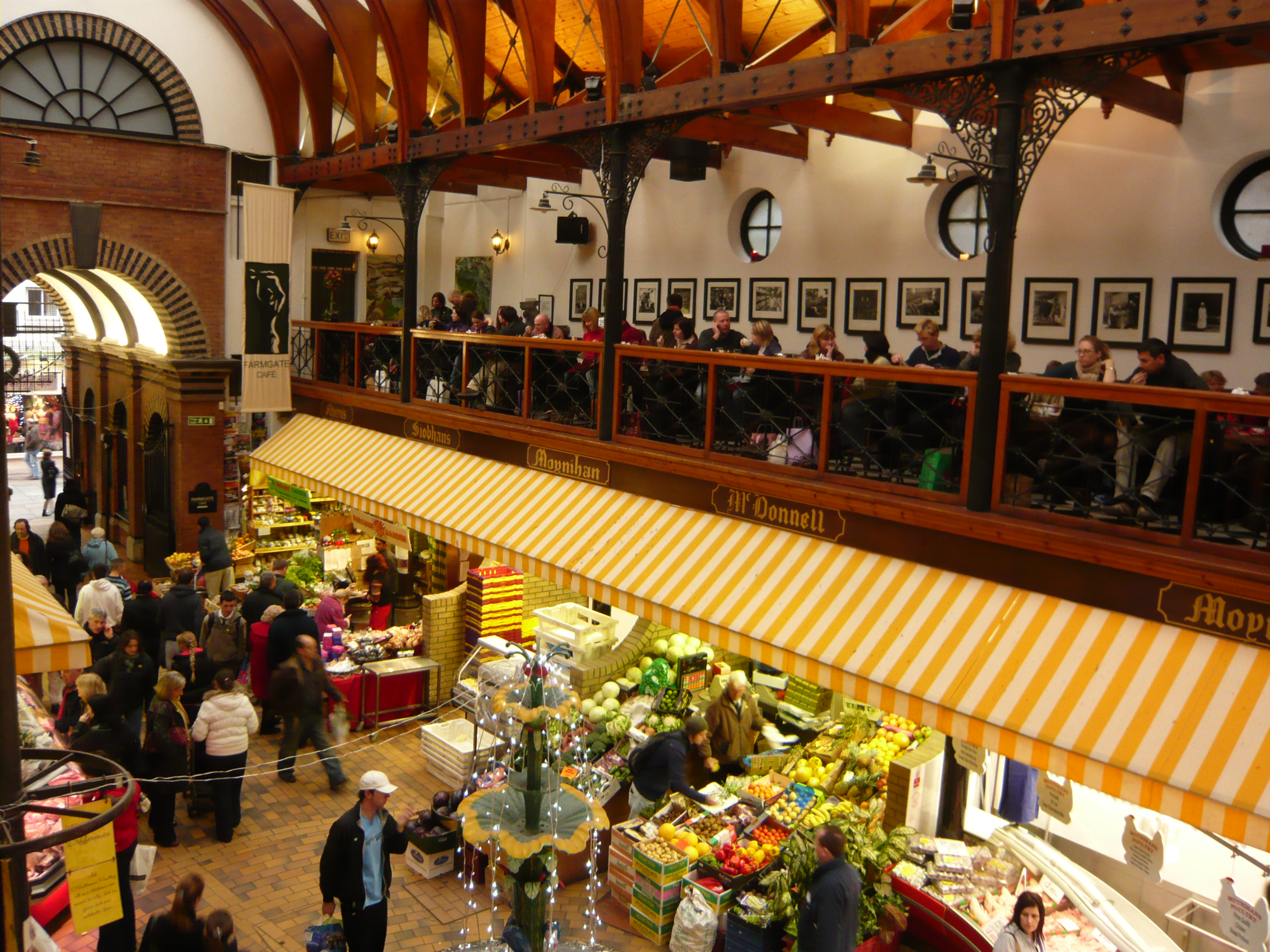
Café on mezzanine floor

It is administered by Cork City Council. A variety of different fresh produce from around the world can be bought in the English Market. The market is still best known however for its fresh fish and butchers, and it serves many of the city's top restaurants. It is a source of local specialities such as drisheen, spiced beef and buttered eggs.

Queen Elizabeth II visited the market during her 2011 state visit to Ireland as did Charles, Prince of Wales during his visit in 2018. Both were served by fishmonger Pat O'Connell. The English Market was used as a location for the 2016 film The Young Offenders and the subsequent TV series of the same name.

Cork City Council and the site's traders commended the market's 230th anniversary in August 2018.

== See also ==
- List of tourist attractions in Ireland
