= Seána Kerslake =

Irish actress

- Born: 21 October 1990 (age 35); Tallaght, Dublin, Ireland
- Occupation: Actress

Seána Kerslake (/ˈʃɔːnə ˈkɜːrzleɪk/; born 21 October 1990) is an Irish actress. She is known for portraying the role of Aisling O'Dowd in RTÉ2 comedy-drama Can't Cope, Won't Cope (2016–2018). In 2017, she was named one of sixteen young actors by Screen International as a Star of Tomorrow. In 2020, she was ranked at number 50 in The Irish Times list of the greatest Irish film actors.

== Early life ==
Kerslake, the middle of three daughters of John and Deirdre Kerslake, was born in 1990 in Tallaght, County Dublin where she was raised. She went on to study English and music at NUI Maynooth, and screen acting at The Factory, Bow Street, Dublin.

== Career ==
In 2010, while a student, Kerslake was cast in Kirsten Sheridan's Dollhouse, an unscripted Irish film. Her performance earned her an Irish Film & Television Academy award nomination in 2013.

In 2016, Kerslake played the title character in A Date for Mad Mary directed by Darren Thornton. Her performance earned positive reviews from The Hollywood Reporter ("mesmerizing") and Variety ("a barnstorming central performance"). She was awarded the Breakthrough Award by the Dublin Film Critics' Circle, and the Bingham Ray New Talent Award at the Galway Film Fleadh 2016.

From 2016 until 2018, Kerslake played Aisling O'Dowd, a struggling twenty-something in RTÉ2's Can't Cope, Won't Cope.

Her first London stage appearance was in May 2018 as Kat in Joe Penhall's Mood Music, director Roger Michell, at The Old Vic.

She appeared in the 2018 film Dublin Oldschool.

She starred in Lee Cronin's The Hole in the Ground, which was released in 2019.

From 2021 to 2023, Kerslake played Grace Ahern in the RTÉ One-Alibi whodunit mini-series Smother.

In 2022, Kerslake appeared as Theresa Claffin in season one of Bad Sisters.

In 2022, Kerslake starred in the film Ballywalter with Patrick Kielty. The film was directed by Prasanna Puwanarajah.

In 2024, she appeared in series two of the BBC One crime drama Blue Lights.
