= The Young Offenders (TV series) =

Television series

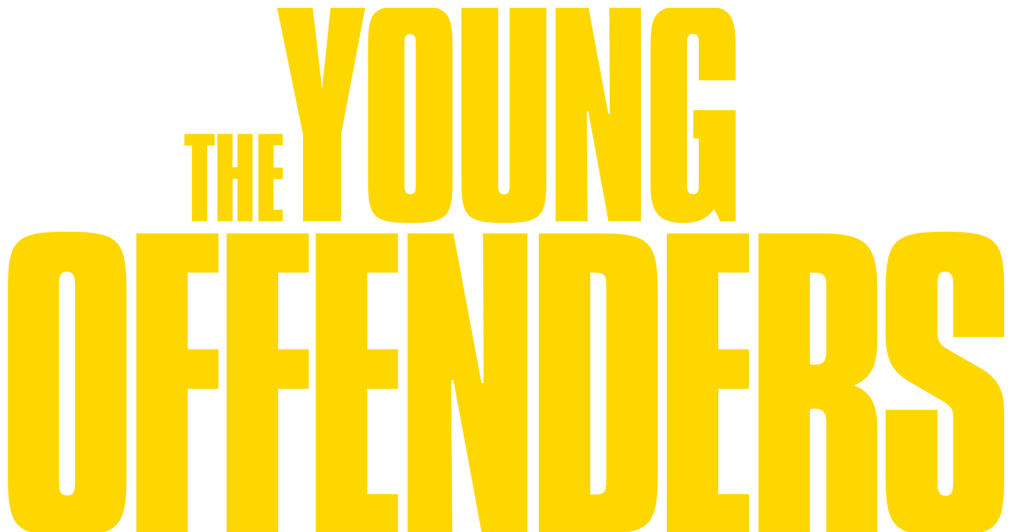
- Genre: Sitcom
- Created by: Peter Foott
- Based on: The Young Offenders by Peter Foott
- Written by: Peter Foott
- Directed by: Peter Foott; Tom Lister
- Starring: Alex Murphy; Chris Walley; Hilary Rose; Dominic MacHale; Jennifer Barry; Demi Isaac Oviawe; P. J. Gallagher; Orla Fitzgerald; Shane Casey
- Narrated by: Alex Murphy
- Music by: Ray Harman
- Country of origin: Ireland
- Original language: English
- No. of series: 5
- No. of episodes: 32 (list of episodes)

Production
- Executive producers: Lotte Beasley; Cormac Fox; Abby Singer; Eddie Doyle; Justin Healy; Peter Foott
- Producer: Martina Niland
- Cinematography: Patrick Jordan
- Editors: Hugh Chaloner; Anna Maria O'Flanagan
- Running time: 30 minutes
- Production companies: Vico Films; BBC

Original release
- Network: RTÉ2; BBC Three; RTÉ One; BBC One
- Release: 1 February 2018 – present

The Young Offenders is an Irish coming-of-age television sitcom, developed by Peter Foott, for RTÉ and the BBC. Based on the IFTA-winning 2016 film of the same name, the first series began broadcasting on 1 February 2018, to generally favourable reviews. The series follows the lives of Conor MacSweeney and Jock O'Keeffe, lovable rogues from Cork.

Alex Murphy and Chris Walley reprised their roles from the film as Conor and Jock respectively, with supporting roles from Hilary Rose as Mairead MacSweeney, Dominic MacHale as Sergeant Tony Healy, P. J. Gallagher as Principal Barry Walsh, Jennifer Barry as Siobhan Walsh, Demi Isaac Oviawe as Linda Walsh, Orla Fitzgerald as Orla Walsh and Shane Casey as Billy Murphy.

Prior to the six-episode first series coming to an end, the programme was recommissioned for a second series, which was broadcast between 3 November and 8 December 2019. A Christmas special was released on 14 December 2018, starring Irish actor Robert Sheehan. A third series was broadcast between July and August 2020.

On 3 March 2023, a fourth series was commissioned by RTÉ and the BBC, with the show moving from BBC Three to BBC One in the United Kingdom. Several months later, RTÉ announced that the release date would be postponed until 2025 as part of €10m worth of RTÉ cost cuts, however the fourth series aired on 10 May 2024 on BBC One & BBC iPlayer.

In an interview, at Cork Person of the Year 2025, Shane Casey confirmed that Series 5 of the show "is going to happen in late May". The fifth series was released on 3 April 2026 on BBC One & BBC iPlayer.

== Series overview ==
The series follows the adventurous and delinquent lives of Cork-based teenagers Conor MacSweeney (Alex Murphy) and Jock O'Keeffe (Chris Walley). Although delinquents, the boys both have deep feelings about certain topics, and these views are explained by Conor in his narration at the end of each episode.

The first series reviews Conor and Jock's feud with their school principal, Barry Walsh (P. J. Gallagher), and their relationships with his daughters, Linda (Demi Isaac Oviawe) and Siobhan (Jennifer Barry), respectively. It also sees Conor try to overcome his fear of his first kiss with Linda, or as Jock calls "shifting", as well as seeing Conor's mother Mairéad (Hilary Rose) begin a relationship with Jock and Connor's enemy, Sergeant Tony Healy (Dominic MacHale), the local police officer. Jock's abusive home life with his alcoholic father (Michael Sands) is addressed further, which results in him moving in with the MacSweeneys.

In the second series, Siobhan is heavily pregnant, and Jock and Conor attempt to earn money in many different ways. Conor and Linda are preparing to go to the next stage of their relationship by having sex. However, their plans are affected when Jock's old best friend Gavin, now Conor's arch-enemy, dares Linda to kiss him. Siobhan's mother Orla (Orla Fitzgerald) and Mairéad attempt to build up a friendship between themselves and the two families for the sake of Siobhan’s baby. Principal Walsh tries to show that Jock is not a worthy father by giving him challenges.

== Cast and characters ==
=== Main ===
- Alex Murphy as Conor MacSweeney:

Conor is the son of Mairéad MacSweeney and the best friend and subsequent foster brother of Jock O'Keeffe. Conor's father was killed in an accident at work. Conor and Jock take part in regular petty criminal acts together.

- Chris Walley as Jock O'Keeffe (Main; Film, seasons 1–3, 5; recurring; 4):

Jock is the best friend and subsequent foster brother of Conor MacSweeney.

- Hilary Rose as Máiréad MacSweeney:

Máiréad is the mother of Conor MacSweeney, and the widow of Conor's father. She gave birth to Conor at the age of 16, which Conor says is "old for their neighbourhood". She works at the English Market as a fishmonger. She is fiercely assertive and very protective of her son, often being called on to get him out of trouble.

- Dominic MacHale as Sergeant Tony Healy:

Healy is a local Garda and the long-term enemy of Jock O'Keeffe and Conor MacSweeney. Healy is determined to expose the identity of serial criminal "fake Billy" (who is Jock in disguise), and he has a "cat and mouse chase" with Jock.

- Jennifer Barry as Siobhan Walsh:

Siobhan is the daughter of Barry and Orla Walsh, the sister of Linda Walsh and the girlfriend of Jock O'Keeffe.

- Demi Isaac Oviawe as Linda Walsh:

Linda is the daughter of Barry and Orla Walsh, the sister of Siobhan Walsh and the girlfriend of Conor MacSweeney. It is clear that she is not biologically related to her family, as she is black whereas her family are all white.

- P. J. Gallagher as Principal Barry Walsh:

Barry Walsh is the principal of St. Finan's Community School, where Conor MacSweeney and Jock O'Keeffe attend, as well as his two daughters, Siobhan and Linda.

- Orla Fitzgerald as Orla Walsh:

Orla is Barry's wife, and Siobhan and Linda's mother.

- Shane Casey as Billy Murphy:

Billy is an unstable psychopath who carries around a knife and regularly mugs locals.

- Twins Penny and Nola Richardson (season 3) and Rylee Hosford (season 4–present) as Star Walsh: The daughter of Jock and Siobhan

=== Recurring ===
- Chris Kent as Conor's father:

Conor's father is the deceased husband of Mairead MacSweeney.

- Cora Fenton as Fiona O'Keeffe:

Jock's mother died when she drowned. Her body was not found, but her car was found on the roadside by a lake.

- Michael Sands as Jock's father:

Jock's father is the alcoholic widower of Jock's mother.

=== Guest ===
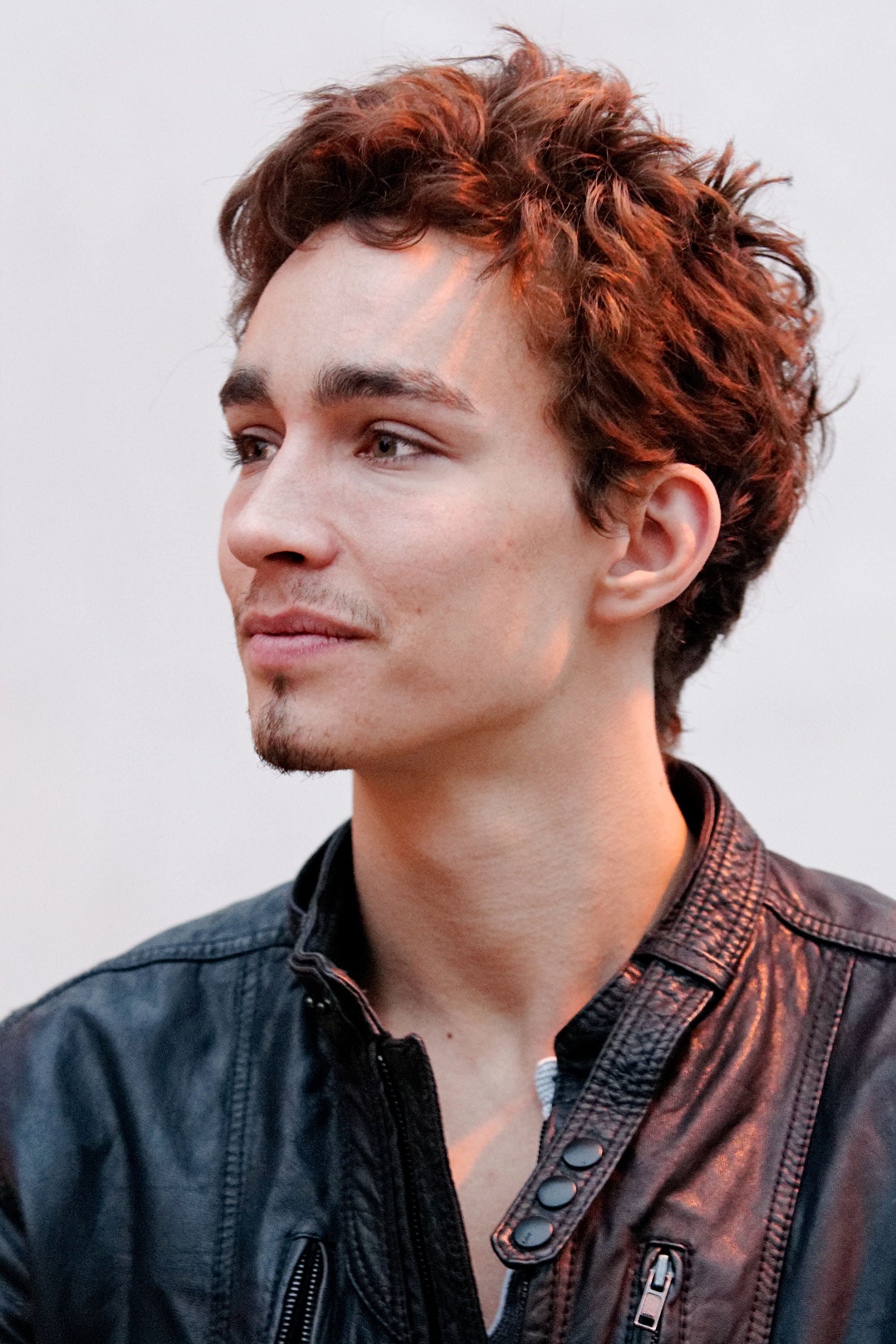
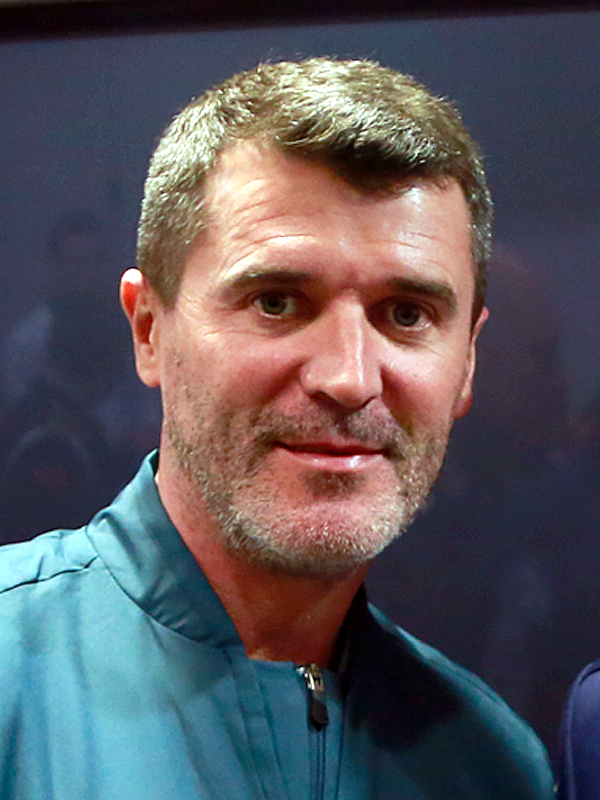
Actor Robert Sheehan (left) and footballer Roy Keane (right) both made cameo appearances in the Christmas special and second series, respectively
- Robert Sheehan:

Irish actor, who is filming for a new film in Cork, where he meets Conor and Jock.

- Roy Keane:

He is seen briefly when he tries to order fish and chips from Mairead, Conor and Jock.

== Production ==
=== Development ===
The film, The Young Offenders, was released in 2016 and was generally well-reviewed, winning an Irish Film & Television Award. With the popularity of the film, it was confirmed on 9 May 2017 that a six-episode television programme, based on the film with the same name, had been ordered by RTÉ, to be broadcast in 2018. Creator, Peter Foott commented, "It's incredibly exciting to be able to work with the BBC and with RTÉ to bring these characters back to the screen, they have been so supportive of the project and will be a wonderful home for it. The public response to the film, and specifically the characters themselves, was just so overwhelming that we really felt there were a lot more stories to tell". This series began broadcasting on 1 February 2018, through the online television service BBC Three, and was later broadcast on RTÉ2 in Ireland on 8 February 2018. With a popular and high reception, the series was recommissioned for a second series, although the projected release date was not disclosed for over a year.

In November 2018, it was confirmed that a Christmas special had been produced to conclude the first series with the episode becoming available for streaming via BBC iPlayer from 14 December onwards, whereas television screen broadcasting occurred on Christmas Day. In October 2019, with lack of news over past months except cast member Shane Casey posting the front cover of an episode script on his Instagram account, it was reported that the second series would begin broadcasting in November. Days later, the BBC confirmed that the second series would commence on 3 November. It was later confirmed that all six episodes would be available to be streamed through the BBC iPlayer service from the second series' premiere date. The second series was well-acclaimed by critics, which resulted in the BBC recommissioning the programme for a third series, to be broadcast in 2020, shortly after the second series concluded.

In July 2020 it was confirmed that, shortly after a short trailer was released by the BBC promoting the third series' forthcoming release, the third series' entire episode list would be released on 19 July 2020. It was also announced that the programme would be broadcast on a weekly basis on BBC One.

=== Casting ===
Upon the confirmation that the programme had been ordered, it was announced that Alex Murphy and Chris Walley would reprise their roles as lead characters Conor MacSweeney and Jock O'Keeffe, respectively. However, through viewing the third episode of the first series, it was shown that Walley's character had officially been renamed for the television series: in the film, the character was nicknamed "Jock", due to him only having one piece of underwear, and his surname was Murphy; whereas in the television programme the character was actually named Jock, with his surname changing from Murphy to O'Keeffe. Furthermore, it was confirmed that Hilary Rose would also be reprising her role from the film, portraying Mairead MacSweeney, the mother of Murphy's character. P. J. Gallagher also returned from the film, though he began portraying the role of Principal Barry Walsh, having portrayed the role of drug dealer Ray in the film, whereas Dominic MacHale and Shane Casey reprised their roles as Sergeant Tony Healy and Billy Murphy from the film, respectively.

New additions to the cast included Jennifer Barry and Demi Isaac Oviawe, who portray the roles of Siobhan and Linda Walsh, the daughters of Principal Walsh; the characters are introduced as love interests for Jock and Connor, respectively. Orla Fitzgerald also joined the cast, portraying the role of Orla Walsh, the wife of Principal Walsh and mother of Siobhan and Linda; she was introduced as a secondary character in the first series though was promoted as a series regular during the second series.

Peaky Blinders star Cillian Murphy was suggested by show producers to Peter Foott as an actor to try and sign on for the second series, and Murphy later told the media that he would be willing to appear in the show if "he was given a good part". In October 2018, it was confirmed that former Love/Hate actor Robert Sheehan had joined the cast in an undisclosed role, after the news was confirmed by Walley during an interview; he portrayed himself in the Christmas special. On 24 November 2018, it was confirmed that a one-off Christmas episode would be broadcast, featuring Sheehan, with the official news that he would only be making a guest appearance in that singular episode. The tradition of celebrities making cameo appearances in the programme continued in the second series, when Irish footballing legend Roy Keane made a brief cameo where the characters attend a Cork City Football Club match as caterers.

=== Filming ===
The majority of the first series was filmed at various locations in Cork. It showed the crew filming at numerous historical locations across the city, including the view from Shandon, the English Market, North Mall & the Franciscan Abbey, Kyrl's Quay & Medieval Cork and Saint Fin Barre's Cathedral. The view from Shandon is a scene from both the television programme and film, in which the majority of the programme's scenes are filmed, usually at the beginning and conclusion of episodes.

In September 2018, the cast were seen filming around Cork in costume, with these events being captured on camera by a fan of the show, who in turn uploaded this image to social media. It was initially believed to be filming for the second series, though this proved not to be the case, with it being the Christmas special being filmed in preparation for a December release date.

Principal photography for the second series began in June 2019, with the BBC confirming that production had begun, with them uploading a promotional image of Murphy and Walley in character. Despite the programme's distributors not publicly announcing its recommissioning for a third series, the third series was filmed back-to-back alongside the second series.

=== Marketing ===
Scenes from the programme became available on YouTube, which were distributed by BBC Three. The trailer for the second series was released in October 2019.

== Episodes ==
Series	Episodes	Originally released (Ireland)		
Series	Episodes	First released	Last released	Network
1	6	1 February 2018	8 March 2018	RTÉ2
1	Special	14 December 2018		RTÉ2
2	6	11 November 2019	16 December 2019	RTÉ2
3	6	24 July 2020	28 August 2020	RTÉ One

Series	Episodes	Originally released (United Kingdom)		
Series	Episodes	First released	Last released	Network
4	6	10 May 2024	7 June 2024	BBC One
4	Special	20 December 2024		BBC One
5	6	3 April 2026	1 May 2026	BBC One

== Broadcast ==
Region/Country	Release title	Broadcaster	First broadcast date
Republic of Ireland	The Young Offenders	RTÉ Two	1 February 2018
United Kingdom	The Young Offenders	BBC Three; BBC Two; BBC One	1 February 2018 (online); 9 February 2018 (television)

== Reception ==
=== Critical response ===
Aoife Kelly of the Irish Independent released a positive review of the programme after the broadcast of the first episode, commenting, "It takes the best of the movie and builds on it". Bruce Dessau stated that the programme was a brilliant show to watch, and that he believed that it had a similar reputation to Channel 4 series Derry Girls, set in Northern Ireland, with other journalists calling for a crossover to be produced of the two programmes for the future. Some articles reported the show as "heart-warming", with the third episode of the first series receiving generally favourable reviews from fans and critics alike.

=== Accolades ===
Year	Ceremony	Nominee(s)	Award	Result
2018	Rose d'Or	The Young Offenders	Best Sitcom	Nominated
2018	Irish Film & Television Academy	Chris Walley	Best Male Performance – Television	Won
2018	British Academy of Film and Television Arts	Chris Walley	Breakthrough Brit	Won
