= Alex Murphy (actor) =

Irish actor

- Born: 26 December 1997 (age 28); Cork, Ireland
- Occupation: Actor
- Years active: 2016–present
- Known for: The Young Offenders franchise

Alex Murphy (born 26 December 1997) is an Irish actor. He is best known for his role as Conor MacSweeney in the 2016 comedy film The Young Offenders, for which he received an IFTA nomination for best actor in a lead film role.

Murphy reprised his role in the 2018 television series of the same name, produced by RTÉ and the BBC. In 2022, he appeared in the Hulu/BBC/RTÉ television adaptation of Conversations with Friends.

== Early life and training ==
Murphy is from Rochestown in Cork, and began acting at the age of seven or eight at Declan Wolfe Stage School in Douglas (now Studio Wolfe Performing Arts), where he attended classes for several years. He later trained at The Lir Academy of Dramatic Art at Trinity College Dublin, graduating with a Bachelor in Acting in 2019. He has performed the role of John Proctor in a production of Arthur Miller's The Crucible directed by Declan Wolfe.

== Filmography ==
Year	Title	Role	Format	Notes
2016	The Young Offenders	Conor MacSweeney	Film	Debut
2018–present	The Young Offenders	Conor MacSweeney	Television	Lead role; 32 episodes
2022	Conversations with Friends	Philip	Television	Supporting role; 6 episodes
2024	Crá	Garda Barry Roche	Television	
2025	Saipan	Eddie Power	Film	

== Awards and nominations ==
In March 2019, along with his co star from The Young Offenders Chris Walley, Alex was jointly nominated for a Royal Television Society Award in The Best Male comedy performance category.

Year	Work	Award	Result	Notes
2016	The Young Offenders	Súil Eile Award	Won	Shared with Chris Walley
2016	The Young Offenders	Ros Hubbard Award for Acting	Won	Shared with Chris Walley
2017	The Young Offenders	Best Actor in a Leading Role – Film	Nominated	
