= Peter Foott =

Irish film director

- Born: 29 September 1976 (age 49); Cork, Ireland
- Occupations: Director, producer, screenwriter
- Spouse: Hillary Rose (m. 2010)

Peter Foott (born 29 September 1976) is an Irish director, producer and screenwriter known for his work on The Young Offenders.

== Career ==
Foott is one of the co-founders of Vico Films which was formed in 2004. His first short was Just a Little Bit of Love: A Tribute to Des Smyth.

Another short, The Carpenter and His Clumsy Wife was screened on RTÉ, and at a number of film festivals. It won nine awards including 'Best Comedy' at the 2004 Los Angeles Film Festival and a 'Special Mention' at the 2004 Venice Film Festival.

Subsequently, Foott worked primarily in television and comedy, including in directing and producing roles on the RTÉ comedy show Republic of Telly. Foott also won an IFTA in 2010 for 'Best TV Moment’, for directing and producing the Rubberbandits Horse Outside music video. He has also created and produced the hidden camera show The Fear.

In 2016 Foott wrote, directed and produced The Young Offenders, a story inspired by a multi-million cocaine haul off the coast of Cork during 2007. The film was released in September 2016, and had its Irish premiere at the Galway Film Fleadh 2016. The Young Offenders had the biggest opening weekend at the Irish box office of any Irish film in 2016. Its international premiere was held at Fantastic Fest in Austin Texas 2016, and its European premiere was at the BFI London Film Festival in 2016.

== Early and family life ==
Peter Foott, of Monkstown, County Cork, attended Ashton Secondary School and later St. John's Central College in Cork city. He is married to actress Hilary Rose.

== Filmography ==
Foott's film and TV credits include:

- The Young Offenders - TV series (2018–present)
- The Young Offenders - film (2016)
- The Doner (2014)
- The Fear (2012)
- Horse Outside (2010)
- The Republic of Telly (2009–2011)
- An Créatúr (2007)
- The Lump (2005)
- The Carpenter and His Clumsy Wife (2004)
- Just a Little Bit of Love: A Tribute to Des Smyth (2002)

== Awards ==
Year	Award	Category	Title	Result
2016	Los Angeles Comedy Festival	Best Feature Film, Best Feature Screenplay, Best Feature Direction	The Young Offenders	Won
2016	Irish Film Festival London	The Súil Eile Award, The Ros Hubbard Award for Acting	The Young Offenders	Won
2016	Fantastic Fest	Special Mention for Best Comedy Debut	The Young Offenders	Won
2016	Galway Film Fleadh	Best Irish Feature Film	The Young Offenders	Won
2011	IFTA	Best TV Moment of the Year	Horse Outside	Won
2007	Cork Film Festival	Audience Award for Best Irish Film	An Créatúr	Won
2005	Montecatini Terme Film Festival	Fedic Plaque	The Carpenter and His Clumsy Wife	Won
2005	Night of the Living Shorts	2nd Place Jury Award	The Carpenter and His Clumsy Wife	Won
2005	World Fest Houston	Gold Remi Award	The Carpenter and His Clumsy Wife	Won
2005	Cleveland Film Festival	Honourable Mention - Best Student Short	The Carpenter and His Clumsy Wife	Won
2005	Mallorca Film Festival	2nd Place	The Carpenter and His Clumsy Wife	Won
2004	Venice Film Festival	Special Mention Award	The Carpenter and His Clumsy Wife	Won
2004	LA Short Film Festival	Best Comedy	The Carpenter and His Clumsy Wife	Won
2004	Ravenna Nightmare Film Fest	Melies d'Or Award	The Carpenter and His Clumsy Wife	Nominated
2003	Experimento Film Festival	Grand Jury Prize	Just a Little Bit of Love	Won
2002	Hamptons International Film Festival	Best Undergraduate Short Film	Just a Little Bit of Love	Won
