= The Young Offenders (film) =

2016 film by Peter Foott

- Theatrical poster
- Directed by: Peter Foott
- Written by: Peter Foott
- Produced by: Peter Foott; Julie Ryan
- Starring: Alex Murphy; Chris Walley; Dominic MacHale; Hilary Rose; Shane Casey; Pascal Scott; P. J. Gallagher
- Cinematography: Patrick Jordan
- Edited by: Colin Campbell
- Production companies: Vico Films; Bord Scannán na hÉireann/Irish Film Board
- Distributed by: Wildcard Distribution
- Release dates: 8 July 2016 (Galway Film Fleadh); 16 September 2016 (Ireland)
- Running time: 85 minutes
- Country: Ireland
- Language: English
- Budget: €50,000 ($62,509)
- Box office: €735,532 ($919,415)

The Young Offenders is a 2016 Irish comedy film written, directed, and co-produced by Peter Foott. It stars Alex Murphy, Chris Walley, Dominic MacHale, Hilary Rose, Shane Casey, Pascal Scott, and P. J. Gallagher.

A television series sequel, airing for five seasons on RTÉ and BBC from February 2018, saw much of the film cast reprise their roles.

== Plot ==
Best friends Conor and Jock are two teenagers from Cork who dress the same, act the same, and even have the same weak facial hair. Jock is a notorious bike thief who plays a daily game of cat-and-mouse with the bike-theft-obsessed Garda Healy, and he lives with his drunken, abusive dad. Conor is the son of a single mum, Mairéad, who works in a fish shop at the English Market and with whom he has a strained relationship. When a narcotic trafficking boat capsizes off the southwest coast of County Cork, leading to the seizure of 61 bales of cocaine, each worth €7 million, word gets out that there is a bale missing.

Conor and Jock steal two bicycles and go on a road trip, hoping to find the missing cocaine, which they can sell and therefore escape their troubled home lives. Unfortunately for them, Healy had hid a GPS tracker in the bike that Jock stole for himself as a trap and is in hot pursuit. By chance, the boys find the bale of coke in a ruined castle that Conor was defecating in, in the possession of a disabled narcotics dealer named Ray. They steal it while he is asleep but he wakes up and unsuccessfully tries to retake it.

Using Conor's hoodie which he left with Ray to keep him warm while he slept, and had Conor's name on it, Ray gives chase to the pair. In the midst of celebrating their victory, Conor unknowingly snags the bag on barbed wire and rips it, so the coke slowly leaks out on the journey home until there is none left by the time they get back. The two fall out and Jock gets intoxicated and passes out, while Conor comes home and eventually patches things up with his mum. Jock's father comes home and violently assaults him until Healy comes to Jock's home intending to arrest him, subsequently realising the extent of Jock's life at home.

However, Jock sneaks out upon being informed that Ray is searching for them by a neighbourhood friend. Ray later tracks them down, steals a nail gun from a hardware shop, and angrily invades Conor's house as Jock gets to his house to tell him about Ray, and Healy simultaneously gets there searching for Conor. Ray knocks out Healy and threatens Conor, Jock and Mairéad, not believing that the boys are so stupid as to lose €7 million worth of cocaine. Strangely enough, a local thug named Billy Murphy whom the pair put in prison on narcotics charges by tricking Healy into thinking he stole a bike enters, looking for revenge against the boys.

In a rare show of intellect, Conor tricks Ray into thinking Billy stole the coke and a struggle ensues where Mairéad ends up knocking out both Ray and Billy, and both are arrested. Conor and Jock spin the tale to paint Healy as a hero to the media, to his chagrin, while Jock is put into foster care with Conor and his mother due to his abusive upbringing.

== Cast ==
- Alex Murphy as Conor MacSweeney
- Chris Walley as Jock Murphy
- Hilary Rose as Mairéad MacSweeney
- Dominic MacHale as Sergeant Healy
- P. J. Gallagher as Ray
- Shane Casey as Billy Murphy
- Pascal Scott as Farmer
- Judy Donovan as Local Shopkeeper
- Michael Sands as Jock's Dad
- Ciaran Bermingham as Superintendent Flynn
- Stephen O'Connor as Angry Dad
- Fionula Linehan as DIY Worker
- Antoinette Hilliard as Fish Head Woman

== Production ==
The film is based on Operation Seabight, the seizure of 1.5 tonnes of cocaine off the Irish coast near Mizen Head in 2007. The film was shot in Cork and along the Wild Atlantic Way.

== Release ==
The Young Offenders premiered at the Galway Film Fleadh on 8 July 2016, and won Best Irish Feature Film at the festival. It became the fastest Irish film to break the €1 million mark at the Irish box office in 2016. Carnaby Sales and Distribution has acquired the international sales rights to the film, while a deal with Vertigo Releasing would see the film released in the United Kingdom, United States, Canada, New Zealand, and Australia.

The film had its premiere for the United States at Fantastic Fest in Austin, Texas, on 23 September 2016, where it won a Special Mention for Best Comedy Debut. It was released in the United Kingdom on 13 January 2017.

== Reception and awards ==
The Irish Examiner scored the film 4/5, saying "huge potential for that rare breakout hit which also attains a cultish following with endlessly quotable one liners". The Irish Times named it as one of the highlights of the Galway Film Fleadh, saying that Walley and Murphy are "brilliant as track suited layabouts who, though lazy, impulsive and ignorant, remain endlessly lovable throughout". After its premiere in the United States, The Austin Chronicle called the film "a charming return for Irish comedy". On Rotten Tomatoes the film has a 100% approval rating based on 22 reviews.

Year	Award	Category	Result
2016	Los Angeles Comedy Festival	Best Feature Film, Best Feature Screenplay, Best Feature Direction	Won
2016	Irish Film Festival London	The Súil Eile Award, The Ros Hubbard Award for Acting	Won
2016	Fantastic Fest	Special Mention for Best Comedy Debut	Won
2016	Galway Film Fleadh	Best Irish Feature Film	Won
2016	Dublin Film Critics Awards	Best Irish Film	Nominated
2017	Irish Film and Television Awards	Best Script - Film	Won
2017	Irish Film and Television Awards	Best Film	Nominated
2017	Irish Film and Television Awards	Best Actor in a Lead Role - Alex Murphy	Nominated
2017	Irish Film and Television Awards	Best Actor in a Supporting Role - Chris Walley	Nominated
2017	Irish Film and Television Awards	Best Actress in a Supporting Role - Hilary Rose	Nominated
2017	Irish Film and Television Awards	Best Director- Film - Peter Foott	Nominated
2017	Irish Film and Television Awards	Rising Star Award - Peter Foott	Nominated

== In other media ==
=== Television ===
In May 2017, a six episode television series was announced. The series began to air in February 2018, with the BBC commissioning a second season which aired in late 2019. A third season aired in 2020.
