= IFTA Award for Best Supporting Actress – Film =

Irish film industry award

IFTA Award for Supporting Actress – Film
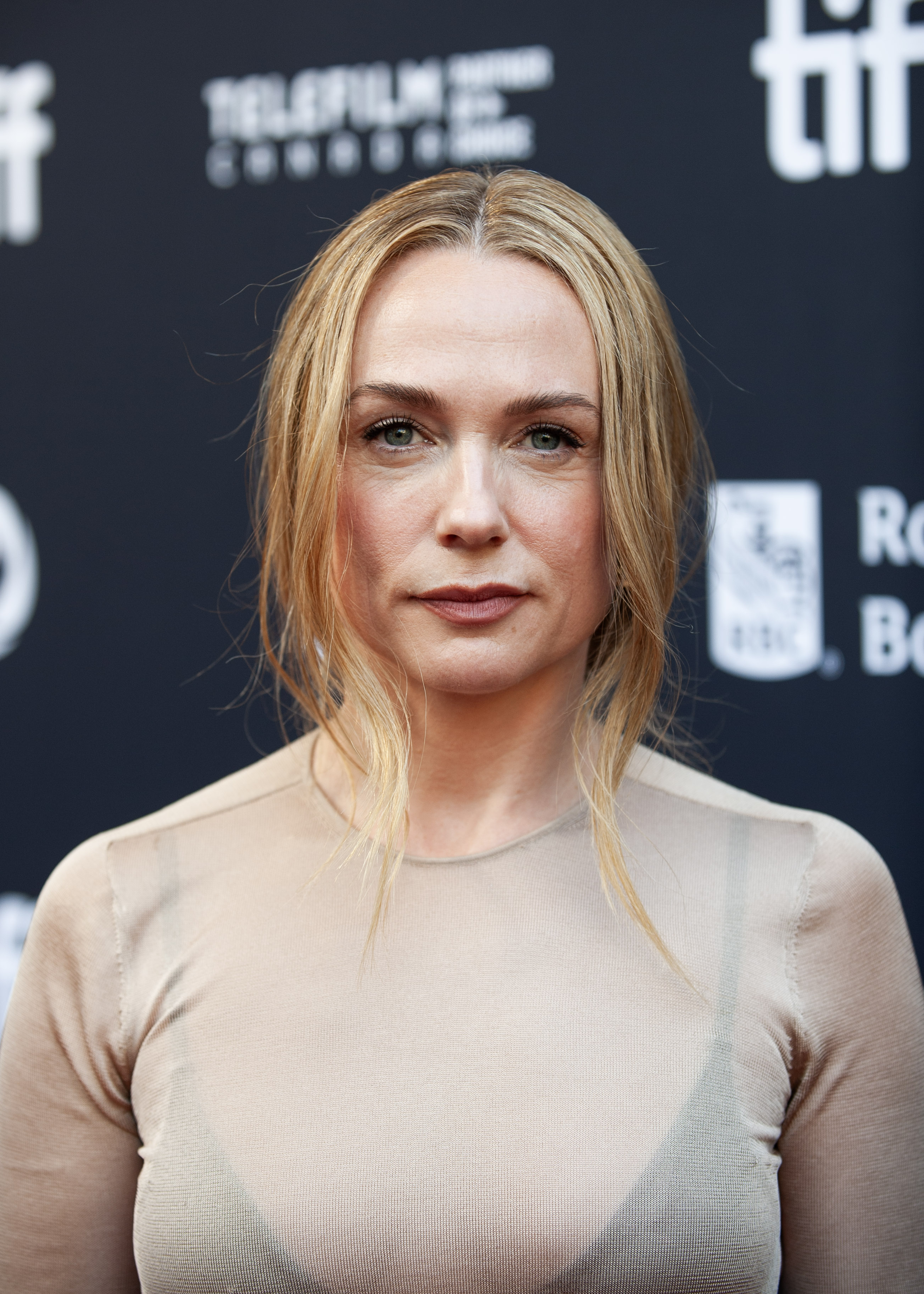
- The 2025 recipient: Kerry Condon
- Awarded for: Best Performance by an Actress in a Supporting Role
- Country: Ireland
- Presented by: Irish Film & Television Academy (IFTA)
- First award: 2003
- Most recent winner: Kerry Condon, F1 (2026)
- Website: ifta.ie

The IFTA Award for Supporting Actress – Film is an award presented annually by the Irish Film & Television Academy (IFTA). It has been presented since the 3rd Irish Film & Television Awards ceremony in 2005 to an Irish actress who has delivered an outstanding performance in a supporting role in a feature film. For the first and second ceremonies, supporting performances for film and television were combined into one category.

The record for most wins is four, held by Saoirse Ronan, while Kerry Condon and Fionnula Flanagan have won the award twice. Ronan also holds the record for most nominations with five, a record she shares with Condon and Ger Ryan. Condon is the award's most recent winner, winning her second award for her performance in F1 (2025).

== Eligibility ==
The award is exclusively open to Irish actresses. The rules define an Irish person as follows:

- Born in Ireland (32 counties) or
- Have Irish Citizenship or
- Be full-time resident in Ireland (minimum of 3 years)

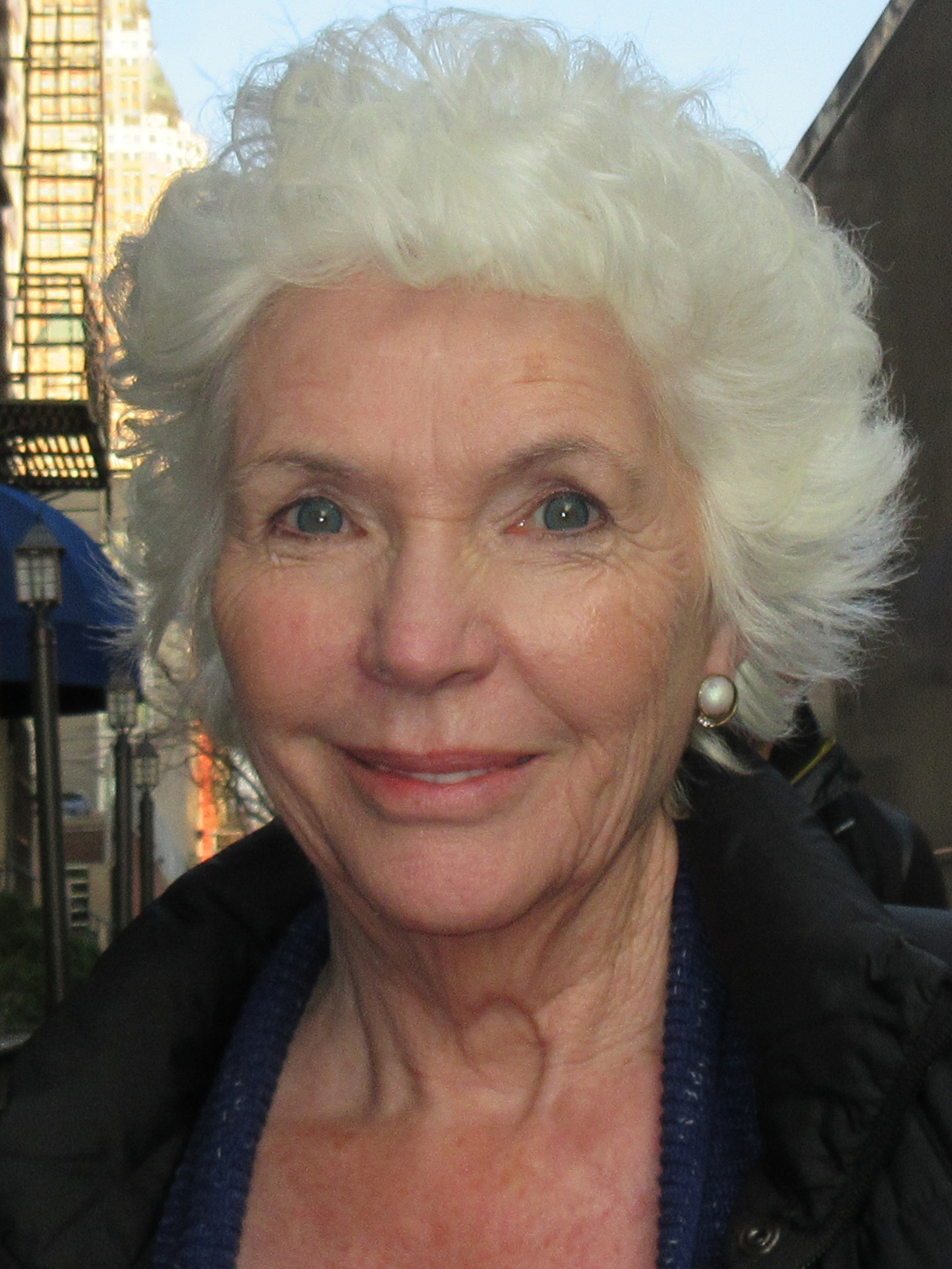
Fionnula Flanagan won twice, for Transamerica (2005) and The Guard (2011).

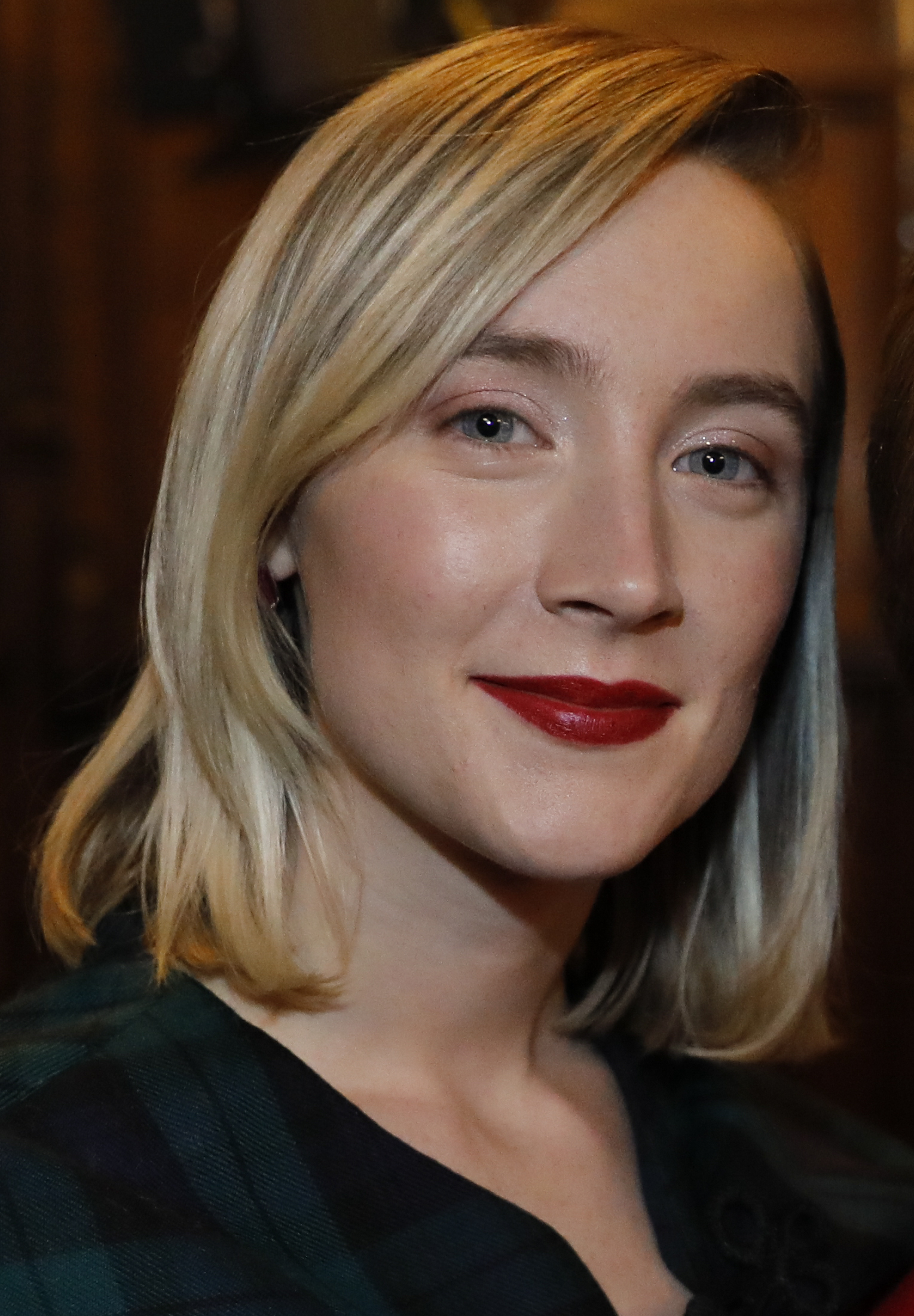
Saoirse Ronan won four times, for Atonement (2007), Death Defying Acts (2007), The Way Back (2010), and Blitz (2024).

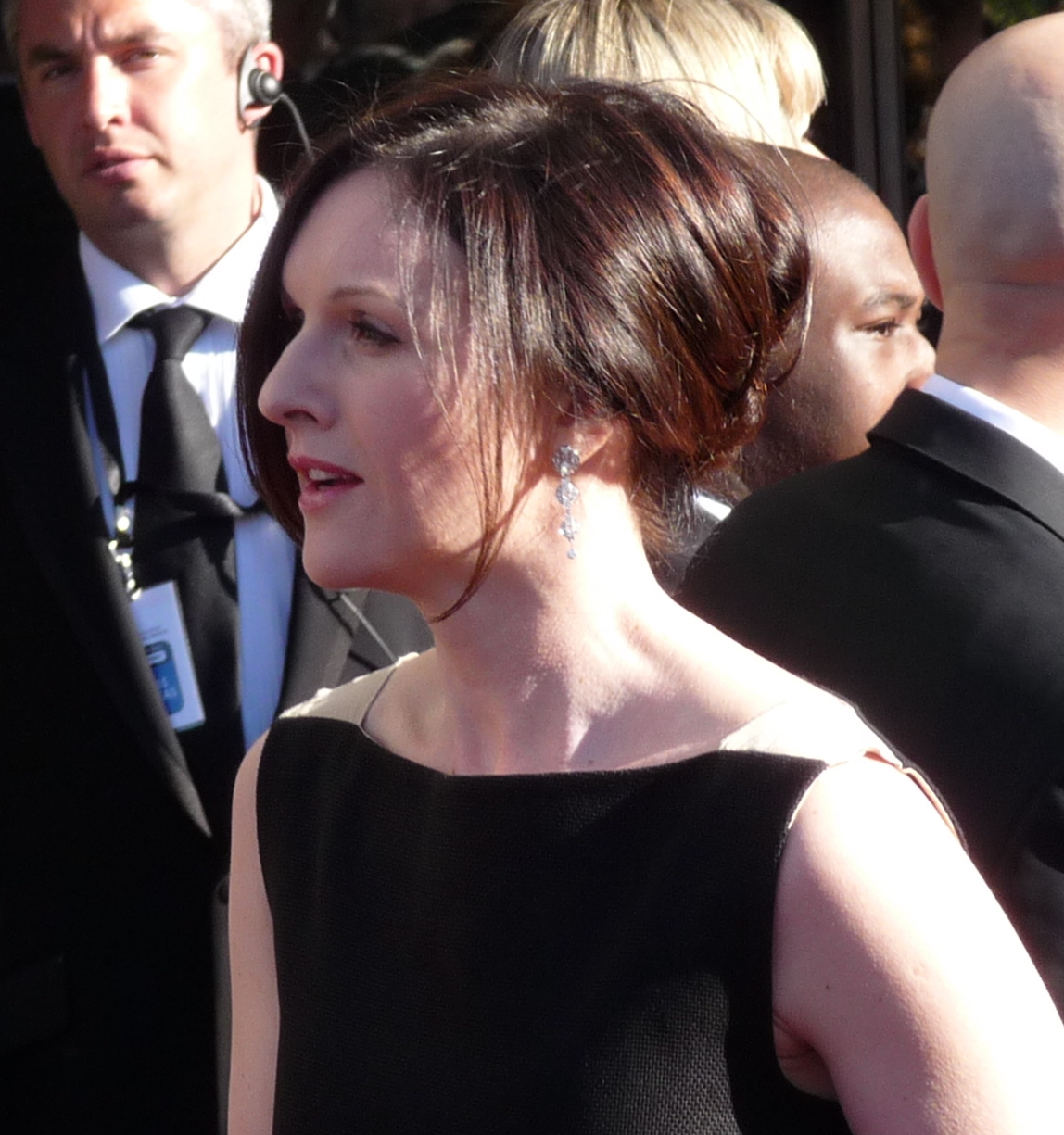
Dervla Kirwan won for Ondine (2009).

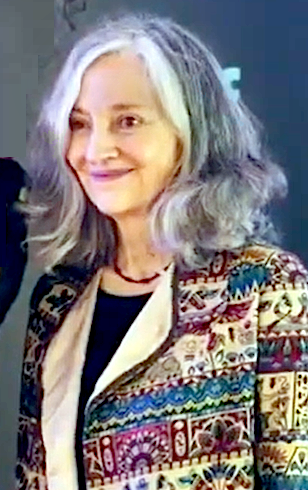
Bríd Brennan won for Shadow Dancer (2012).

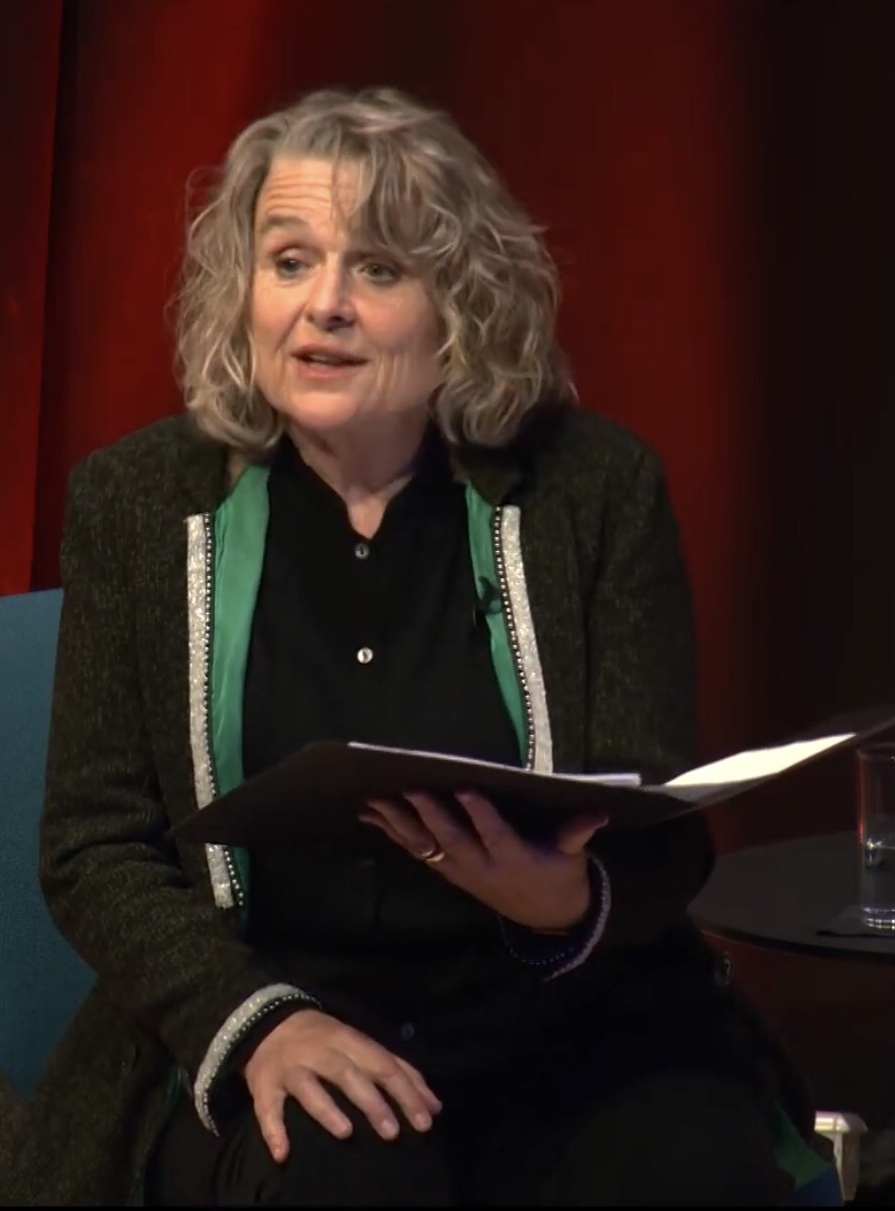
Sinéad Cusack won for The Sea (2013).

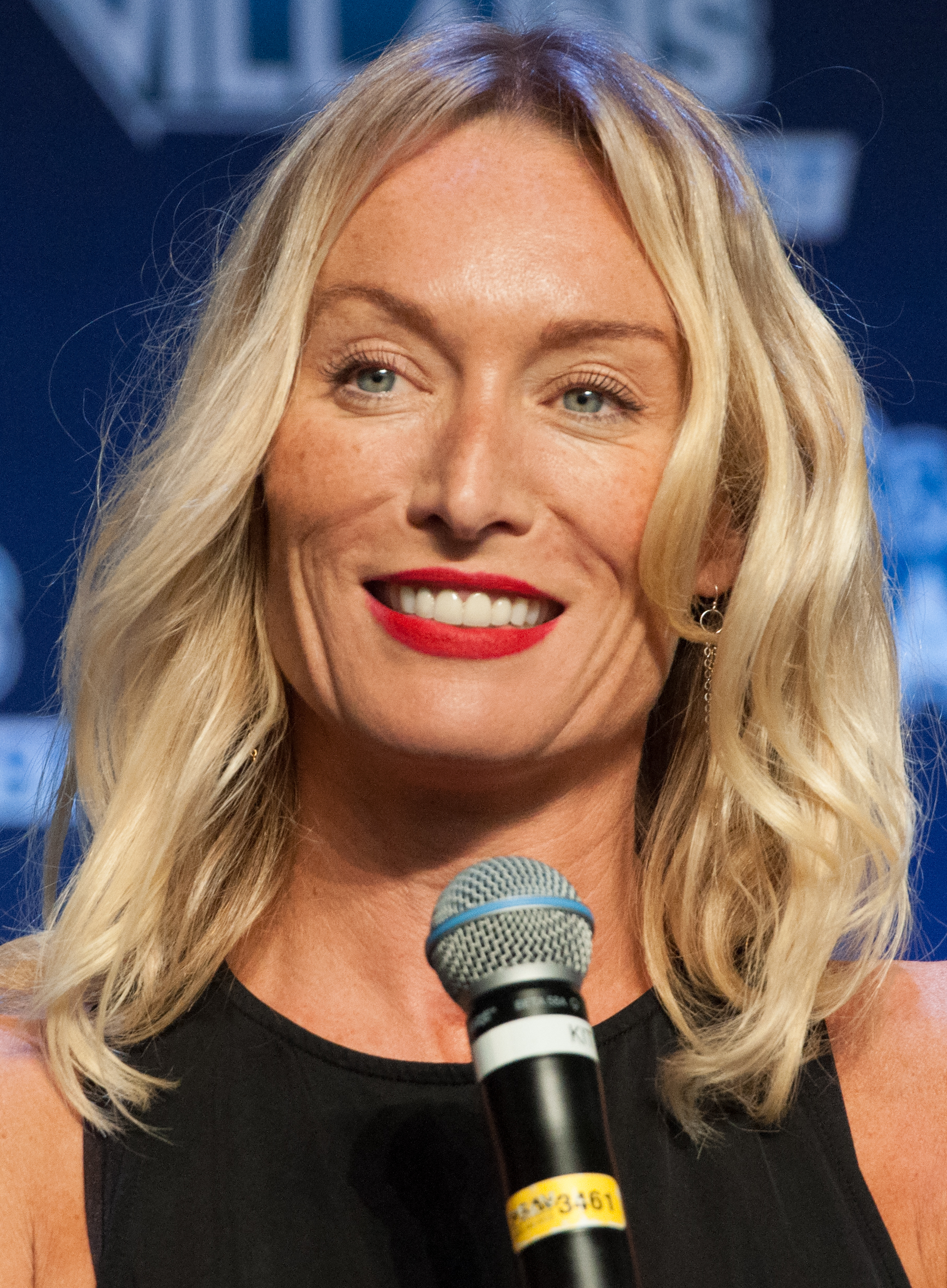
Victoria Smurfit won for The Lears (2017).

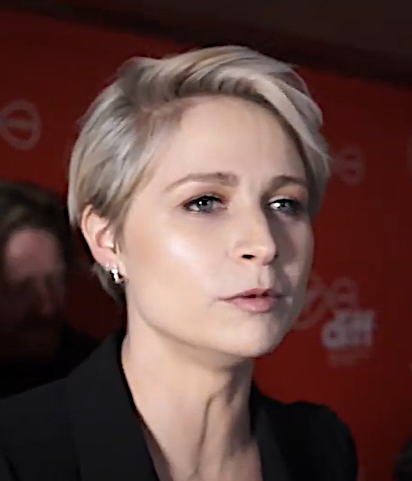
Niamh Algar won for Calm with Horses (2019).

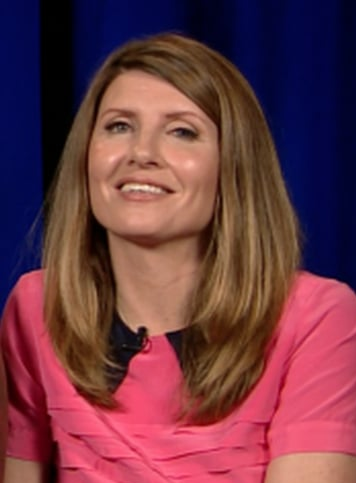
Sharon Horgan won for Dating Amber (2020).

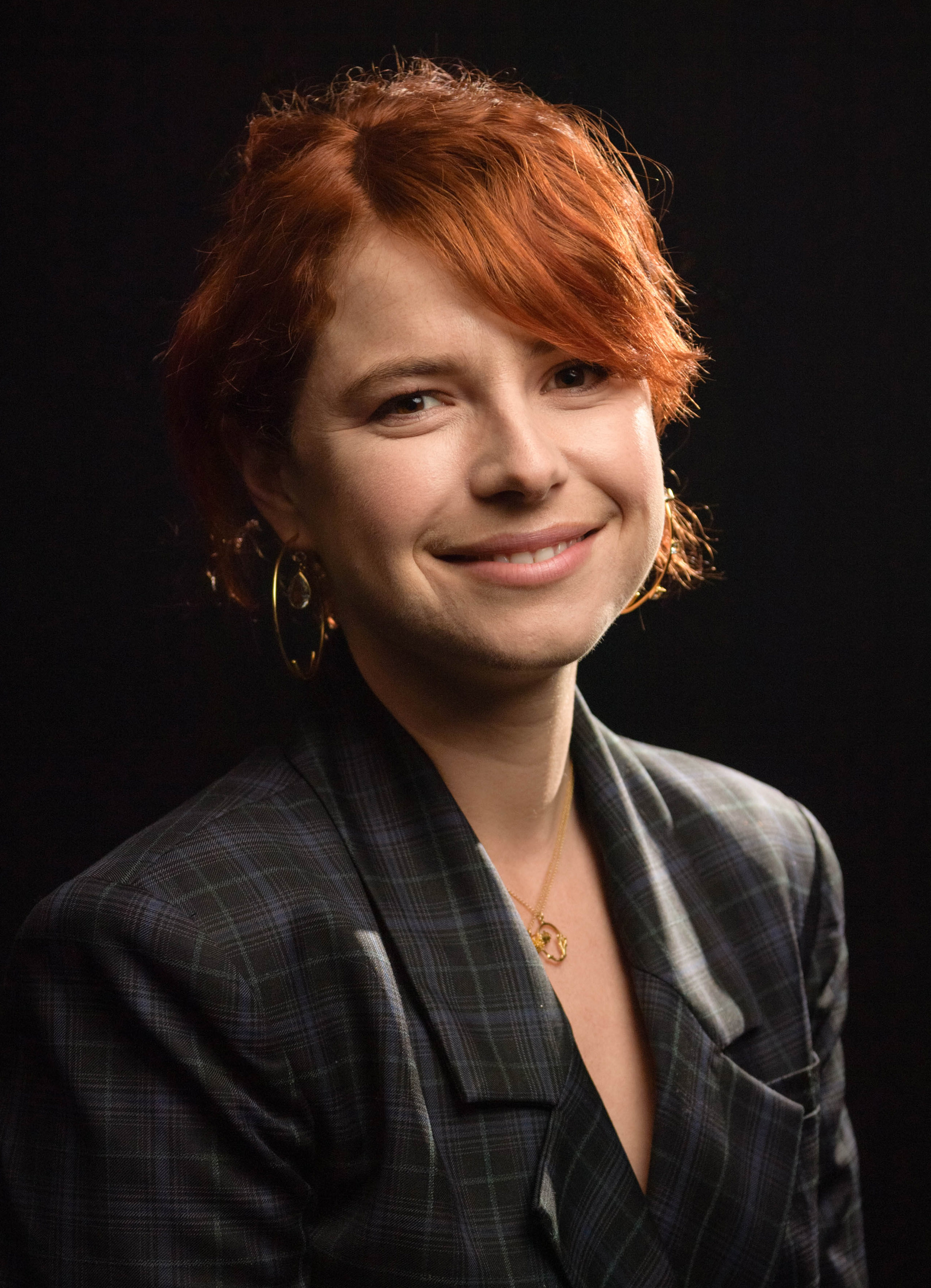
Jessie Buckley won for The Lost Daughter (2021).

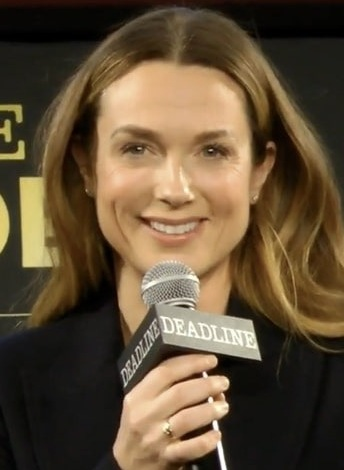
Kerry Condon won twice for The Banshees of Inisherin (2022) and F1 (2025).

== Winners and nominees ==
In the following table, the years are listed as the year of film. The first three ceremonies were held at the end of the year, but since the 4th Irish Film & Television Awards the ceremonies have generally been held the following year. As there was no ceremony in 2019, the 16th Irish Film & Television Awards covered a period of two years.

Table key
‡	Indicates the winner

=== 2000s ===
Year	Actress	Film	Ref.
2003 (Note: For the first two ceremonies, supporting performances for film and television were combined into one category. Only nominees from films are included in this list.) (1st)	Brenda Fricker	Veronica Guerin	
2003 (1st)	Fiona Glascott	Goldfish Memory	
2003 (1st)	Deirdre O'Kane	Intermission	
2003 (1st)	Ger Ryan	Intermission	
2004 (2nd)	Susan Lynch ‡	16 Years of Alcohol	
2004 (2nd)	Jasmine Russell	Capital Letters	
2004 (2nd)	Ger Ryan	The Return	
2005 (3rd)	Charlotte Bradley ‡	The Boys & Girl from County Clare	
2005 (3rd)	Nora-Jane Noone	The Descent	
2005 (3rd)	Deirdre O'Kane	Boy Eats Girl	
2005 (3rd)	Tatiana Ouliankina	Short Order	
2006 (4th)	Fionnula Flanagan ‡	Transamerica	
2006 (4th)	Sinéad Cusack	The Tiger's Tail	
2006 (4th)	Orla Fitzgerald	The Wind That Shakes the Barley	
2006 (4th)	Ruth Negga	Breakfast on Pluto	
2007 (5th)	Saoirse Ronan ‡	Atonement	
2007 (5th)	Elaine Cassidy	And When Did You Last See Your Father?	
2007 (5th)	Anne-Marie Duff	Garage	
2007 (5th)	Gail Fitzpatrick	Strength and Honour	
2008 (6th)	Saoirse Ronan ‡	Death Defying Acts	
2008 (6th)	Sarah Bolger	The Spiderwick Chronicles	
2008 (6th)	Lesley Conroy	Eden	
2008 (6th)	Ger Ryan	Dorothy	
2009 (7th)	Dervla Kirwan ‡	Ondine	
2009 (7th)	Anne-Marie Duff	Nowhere Boy	
2009 (7th)	Nora-Jane Noone	Savage	
2009 (7th)	Ger Ryan	Happy Ever Afters	

=== 2010s ===
Year	Actress	Film	Ref.
2010 (8th)	Saoirse Ronan ‡	The Way Back	
2010 (8th)	Kerry Condon	The Runway	
2010 (8th)	Marcella Plunkett	Swansong: Story of Occi Byrne	
2010 (8th)	Eileen Walsh	Snap	
2011 (9th)	Fionnula Flanagan ‡	The Guard	
2011 (9th)	Maria Doyle Kennedy	Albert Nobbs	
2011 (9th)	Brenda Fricker	Albert Nobbs	
2011 (9th)	Amy Huberman	Stella Days	
2012 (10th)	Bríd Brennan ‡	Shadow Dancer	
2012 (10th)	Bronagh Gallagher	Grabbers	
2012 (10th)	Charlene McKenna	Jump	
2012 (10th)	Gabrielle Reidy	What Richard Did	
2013 (11th)	Sinéad Cusack ‡	The Sea	
2013 (11th)	Fionnula Flanagan	Life's a Breeze	
2013 (11th)	Jane McGrath	The Stag	
2013 (11th)	Orla O'Rourke	Calvary	
2014 (12th)	Sarah Greene ‡	Noble	
2014 (12th)	Kerry Condon	Gold	
2014 (12th)	Sinéad Cusack	Queen and Country	
2014 (12th)	Catherine Walker	Patrick's Day	
2015 (13th)	Jane Brennan ‡	Brooklyn	
2015 (13th)	Gemma-Leah Devereux	Get Up & Go	
2015 (13th)	Olwen Fouéré	The Survivalist	
2015 (13th)	Siobhán O'Kelly	An Klondike	
2015 (13th)	Ger Ryan	The Callback Queen	
2016 (14th)	Charleigh Bailey ‡	A Date for Mad Mary	
2016 (14th)	Simone Kirby	Notes on Blindness	
2016 (14th)	Susan Lynch	Bad Day for the Cut	
2016 (14th)	Hilary Rose	The Young Offenders	
2016 (14th)	Fiona Shaw	Out of Innocence	
2017 (15th)	Victoria Smurfit ‡	The Lears	
2017 (15th)	Niamh Algar	The Drummer & the Keeper	
2017 (15th)	Sarah Carroll	The Limit Of	
2017 (15th)	Fionna Hewitt-Twamley	Cardboard Gangsters	
2017 (15th)	Deirdre O'Kane	Halal Daddy	
2018/19 (16th)	Niamh Algar ‡	Calm with Horses	
2018/19 (16th)	Caitríona Balfe	Le Mans '66	
2018/19 (16th)	Seána Kerslake	Dublin Oldschool	
2018/19 (16th)	Charlie Murphy	Dark Lies the Island	
2018/19 (16th)	Emily Taaffe	The Dig	
2018/19 (16th)	Catherine Walker	We Ourselves	

=== 2020s ===
Year	Actress	Film	Ref.
2020/21 (17th)	Sharon Horgan †	Dating Amber	
2020/21 (17th)	Kathy Kiera Clarke	A Bend in the River	
2020/21 (17th)	Molly McCann	Herself	
2020/21 (17th)	Ally Ní Chiaráin	Broken Law	
2020/21 (17th)	Saoirse Ronan	Ammonite	
2021/22 (18th)	Jessie Buckley ‡	The Lost Daughter	
2021/22 (18th)	Caitríona Balfe	Belfast	
2021/22 (18th)	Carrie Crowley	An Cailín Ciúin	
2021/22 (18th)	Amy-Joyce Hastings	Who We Love	
2021/22 (18th)	Ruth Negga	Passing	
2022/23 (19th)	Kerry Condon ‡	The Banshees of Inisherin	
2022/23 (19th)	Jessie Buckley	Women Talking	
2022/23 (19th)	Elaine Cassidy	The Wonder	
2022/23 (19th)	Kíla Lord Cassidy	The Wonder	
2022/23 (19th)	Aisling Franciosi	God's Creatures	
2022/23 (19th)	Eileen Walsh	Ann	
2023 (20th)	Alison Oliver ‡	Saltburn	
2023 (20th)	Bronagh Gallagher	Dance First	
2023 (20th)	Ruth McCabe	That They May Face the Rising Sun	
2023 (20th)	Agnes O'Casey	The Miracle Club	
2023 (20th)	Maya O'Shea	Verdigris	
2023 (20th)	Catherine Walker	My Sailor, My Love	
2024 (21st)	Saoirse Ronan ‡	Blitz	
2024 (21st)	Zara Devlin	Small Things Like These	
2024 (21st)	Clare Dunne	Kathleen Is Here	
2024 (21st)	Fionnuala Flaherty	Kneecap	
2024 (21st)	Simone Kirby	Kneecap	
2024 (21st)	Jessica Reynolds	Kneecap	
2025 (22nd)	Kerry Condon ‡	F1	
2025 (22nd)	Bríd Brennan	Aontas	
2025 (22nd)	Kerry Condon	Train Dreams	
2025 (22nd)	Sarah Greene	Trad	
2025 (22nd)	Dearbhla Molloy	Four Mothers	
2025 (22nd)	Emma Willis	Christy	

== Multiple awards and nominations ==
The following individuals have received two or more Supporting Actress awards:

Wins	Actress	Nominations
4	Saoirse Ronan	5
2	Kerry Condon	5
2	Fionnula Flanagan	3

The following individuals have received two or more Supporting Actress nominations:

Nominations	Actress
5	Kerry Condon
5	Saoirse Ronan
5	Ger Ryan
3	Sinéad Cusack
3	Fionnula Flanagan
3	Deirdre O'Kane
3	Catherine Walker
2	Niamh Algar
2	Caitríona Balfe
2	Bríd Brennan
2	Jessie Buckley
2	Elaine Cassidy
2	Anne-Marie Duff
2	Brenda Fricker
2	Bronagh Gallagher
2	Sarah Greene
2	Simone Kirby
2	Susan Lynch
2	Ruth Negga
2	Nora-Jane Noone
2	Eileen Walsh
