= Fionnuala Flaherty =

Irish actress

Fionnuala Flaherty is an Irish film and television actress. She was nominated for the Irish Film and Television Award for Best Supporting Actress in a film, for her role in Kneecap (2024). Her film roles have also included Irish film Foscadh (2021). She also had a long-running role as Garda Diana in Irish soap opera Ros na Rún (2020-2023).

== Early life ==
From Inishmore on the Aran Islands, Flaherty is a native Irish speaker. She previously worked as teacher in Dublin before pursuing a career in acting.

== Career ==
Flaherty featured in TG4 series Corp agus Anam prior to her first feature film role in Out of Innocence (2016), a film about the Kerry babies case for which picked up three best actress awards on the European Independent Film Festival circuit. She appeared in TG4 Irish western series An Klondike (known internationally as Dominion Creek).

She had a long running role as Garda Diana in the Irish soap opera Ros na Rún. In 2021, she played nurse Siobahn in the Irish film Foscadh (Shelter), adapted from Donal Ryan’s critically-acclaimed novel The Thing About December by writer/director Seán Breathnach. The film was selected as the Irish entry for the Best International Feature Film at the 94th Academy Awards.

In 2024, she could be seen as Caitlin in the Irish musical biopic Kneecap, playing the Irish-speaking wife of band member JJ "DJ Próvaí" Ó Dochartaigh, who portrayed a version of himself in the film. For her role in the film she was nominated at the 21st Irish Film & Television Awards for Best Supporting Actress in a film, with the award ultimately being won by Saoirse Ronan for Blitz.

== Partial filmography ==
Year	Title	Role	Notes
2014	Corp agus Anam	Shannon Brennan	1 episode
2015	Barney Bunion	Bronagh	1 episode
2015-2017	An Klondike	Bridget Mannion	8 episodes
2016	Out of Innocence	Sarah Flynn	Film
2017	Lost & Found	Trish	
2020	Samhlu 20	Garda	
2020-2023	Ros na Run	Diana	32 episodes
2021	Foscadh	Siobhan	
2024	Kneecap	Caitlin	Nominated for IFTA for Best Supporting Actress
