= Red Election =

Spy drama television series

- Genre: Drama; Espionage; Spy thriller
- Created by: William Diskay; Jonas løkke; Ola Norén; Roland Ulvselius; Stephen Brady
- Written by: Stephen Brady; Paul Coates; Rachel Smith
- Directed by: Jill Robertson; Paul Murphy; Declan Recks
- Music by: Kormac
- Original languages: English; Russian; Danish
- No. of episodes: 10

Production
- Executive producers: Stephen Brady; Frederik Ljungberg; Moreyba Bidessie; Jill Robertson; William Diskay; Christian Alveborg; Jonas lord
- Producers: Tristan Orpen Lynch; Aoife O'Sullivan; Veronika Eriksson
- Cinematography: Ciarán Tanham
- Editors: Eoin McGuirk; Gareth Young
- Running time: 45 minutes
- Production companies: Mopar Studios (Sweden); Subotica (Ireland)

Original release
- Network: Viaplay; (worldwide): Ovation; (United States)
- Release: 3 October 2021

Red Election is an English-language Swedish spy drama television series. The story follows a British intelligence agent (Lydia Leonard) and a Danish secret service agent (Victoria Carmen Sonne) who team up to stop a Russian terrorist attack in Britain. The 10-part series premiered as a Viaplay Original on 3 October 2021

== Cast ==
=== Main ===
- Lydia Leonard as Beatrice Ogilvy, MI5 agent
- Victoria Carmen Sonne as Katrine Poulson, DSIS agent
- Stephen Dillane as William Ogilvy, MI5 director and Beatrice's father
- Kobna Holdbrook-Smith as Levi Nichols, MI5 agent
- Lorraine Burroughs as Etta Cornwell
- Aidan McArdle as Zak
- Clinton Liberty as Marcus
- Goran Kostić as Oleg Adamov
- Ian Kenny as Declan
- James D'Arcy as Adam Cornwell, Prime Minister of the United Kingdom
- Rori Hawthorn as Holly
- Amy Shiels as Nikki Foster-Lyons
- Pavel Kříž as Gavel Surkov
- Sophie Jo Wasson as Isla Robson
- Andy Kellegher as Shaun Graham
- Tadhg Murphy as Nigel Braynor
- Owen Roe

=== Recurring ===
- Stephen Hogan as Alaric Henderson, MI5 agent
- Niels Justesen as Torben Jensen
- Fiach Kunz as Kelvin Cruickshanks

== Production ==
=== Development ===
The drama was created by William Diskay, Jonas Fors, with Ola Norén, Roland Ulvselius, and lead writer Stephen Brady. Paul Coates and Rachel Smith joined Stephen Brady on the writing team. Jill Robertson served as lead director and executive producer of the series. Paul Murphy and Declan Recks were also directors on the series. Executive producing were Moreyba Bidessie of A+E Networks. Veronika Eriksson and Christian Alveborg of Mopar Studios would produce. It is part of Mobpar's English-language slate.

=== Casting ===
In May 2021, Nordic Entertainment Group announced that Stephen Dillane, Lydia Leonard, James D'Arcy, Kobna Holdbrook-Smith, Lorraine Burroughs, and Victoria Carmen Sonne had been cast in the drama with Sonne and Leonard as the lead spy duo.

=== Filming ===
The series and cast announcements dropped just as production wrapped. It had originally begun in 2020, but was shut down after only two weeks due to the COVID-19 pandemic. Filming was able to resume after six months. Principal photography took place in Ireland.

== Release ==
A trailer was released on 23 September 2021. The 10-part series premiered on NENT Group's streaming platform Viaplay in Nordic countries. A+E Networks International are responsible for international distribution. The series premiered on Ovation TV in the United States starting August 6, 2022 as part of the "Mystery Alley" crime drama mystery-themed Saturday night block.

The series premiered on public television channel SBS Television in Australia on 28 October 2021.

The series was added to the Disney+ line up in October 2022 in UK and Ireland.
