= Carmel Winters =

Irish filmmaker and playwright

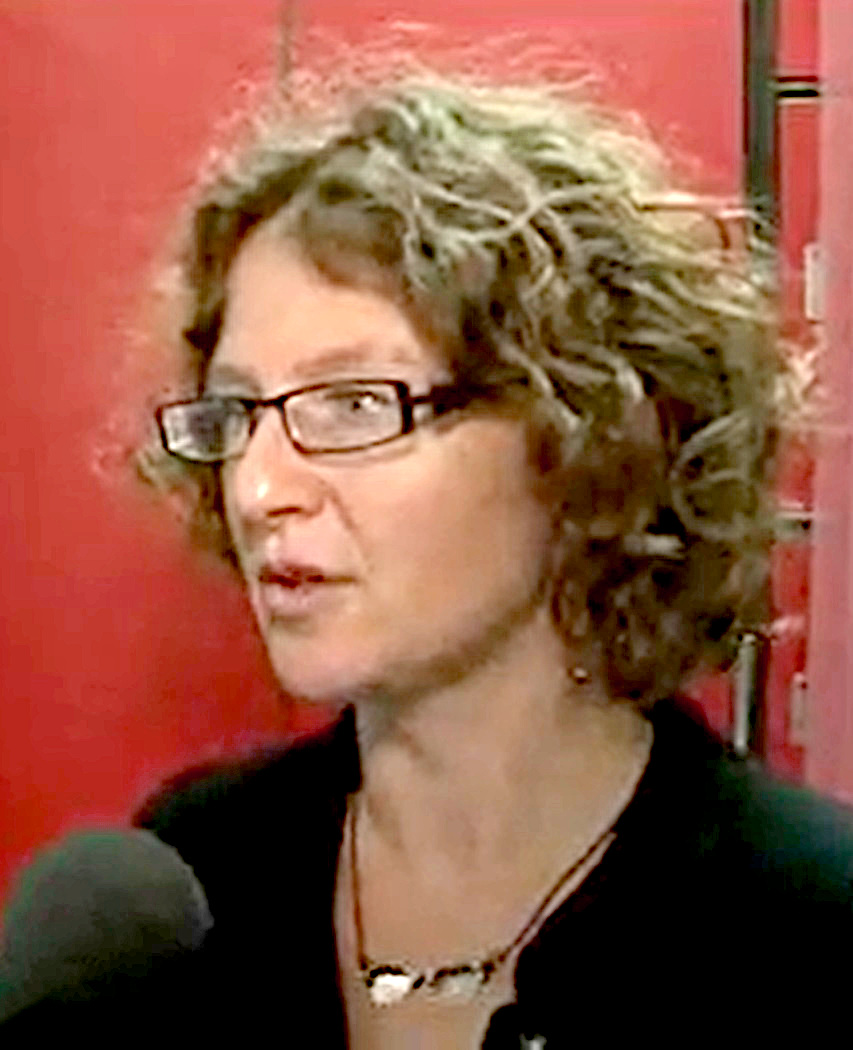
- Winters at JDIFF 2011
- Born: c. 1971
- Education: Trinity College Dublin

Carmel Winters (born c. 1971) is an Irish filmmaker and playwright. Her work includes Snap (2010), B for Baby (2011), Float Like a Butterfly (2018).

== Biography ==
Carmel Winters is from Cork, where she was born into a large family. She had ten older brothers and sisters. She studied Drama and English at Trinity College Dublin.

Winters has written and directed plays and screenplays. She has had films at the Tribeca Film Festival in New York, the Toronto International Film Festival and the Karlovy Vary International Film Festival in the Czech Republic. She has been commissioned to write for the Abbey Theatre and was appointed Film Artist in Residence at University College Cork in 2014–15.

Winters lives in Ballydehob with her wife, Toma McCullim.

== Awards ==
- Snap: Variety Critics Choice Award, ‘Best Irish Feature’ and ‘Best Director’ at the Dublin Critics’ Circle Awards, 2010.
- B for Baby: Irish Times Theatre Award for Best New Play, 2011.
- Float Like A Butterfly: Fipresci Prize for the Discovery Programme at the Toronto International Film Festival, 2018.

== Filmography ==
- Limbo
- Snap
- B For Baby
- Float Like a Butterfly, 2019

== Plays ==
- Best Man
- The Remains of Maisie Duggan
- Time's Up
- Witness
