= Life Support (British TV series) =

- Genre: Medical drama
- Created by: Ashley Pharoah
- Directed by: Morag Fullerton; Richard Laxton
- Starring: Aisling O'Sullivan; Art Malik; Richard Wilson; Gilbert Martin; Julie Graham; Edith MacArthur; Ellie Haddington; Stephen Moyer; Brian Pettifer
- Composer: Adrian Corker
- Country of origin: United Kingdom
- Original language: English
- No. of series: 1
- No. of episodes: 6

Production
- Executive producer: Barbara McKissack
- Producers: Margaret Enefer; Paddy Higson
- Editor: Colin Monie
- Running time: 50 minutes
- Production company: BBC Scotland

Original release
- Network: BBC1
- Release: 19 July – 23 August 1999

Life Support is a British television medical drama series, written and devised by Ashley Pharoah, that first broadcast on BBC1 on 19 July 1999. Produced by BBC Scotland, the series follows the work of clinical ethicist Katherine Doone (Aisling O'Sullivan) and her colleagues based at Glasgow's Caledonian hospital. Just a single series of six episodes were broadcast, with the final episode broadcasting on 23 August 1999. The series was directed by Richard Laxton and Morag Fullerton, while Matthew Hall, Peter Hall and Andrea Earl contributed scripts. Art Malik, Richard Wilson, Gilbert Martin and Julie Graham are also credited as principal members of the cast.

O'Sullivan said of her role in the series; "Initially, when I read the script and saw that it was a medical drama, I wasn't interested, but then I saw that it was addressing these subjects in a very different way from what we're used to. Medicine has become so complicated that the man in the street doesn't know what's going on. So this is a new and necessary discipline." Series creator Ashley Pharoah said of O'Sullivan's casting; "As soon as we saw her audition tape, we knew. She had just what we wanted. You can believe the intellectual stature. the gravitas; she's young and attractive - and she can do comedy. She is perfect for Katherine."

Notably, the series remains unreleased on VHS or DVD. The Evening Standard noted of the series axing; "On the whole, Life Support failed to captivate audiences, although several critics liked it."

== Cast ==
Dr. Katherine Doone, as portrayed by Aisling O'Sullivan

- Aisling O'Sullivan as Dr. Katherine Doone
- Art Malik as Dr. Kamran Blake
- Richard Wilson as John Doone
- Gilbert Martin as James McConnell
- Julie Graham as Alison McIntyre
- Edith MacArthur as Joan Andrews
- Ellie Haddington as Fiona Drummond
- Stephen Moyer as Dr. Tom Scott
- Brian Pettifer as Gordon Travers
- Paul Goodwin as Rod Kerr
- Georgina Sowerby as Sally Rivers
- Gregor Truter as Dr. David McKewan

== Episodes ==
No.	Title	Directed by	Written by	Original release date	Viewers (millions)
1	"Where Angels Fear to Tread"	Richard Laxton	Ashley Pharoah	19 July 1999	N/A
When a severely injured young man is brought into intensive care, Katherine comes into conflict with the hospital hierarchy.
2	"Trust"	Richard Laxton	Ashley Pharoah	26 July 1999	5.33
Katherine is determined that an 11-year-old leukaemia patient should have a say in his treatment, bringing her into conflict with new consultant Dr. Tom Scott and the boy's parents.
3	"The Price of Love"	Richard Laxton	Matthew Hall	2 August 1999	N/A
Called as a prosecution witness in the murder trial of Elaine MacKenzie, Katherine finds herself facing her father, who is acting for the defence.
4	"Playing God"	Morag Fullerton	Peter Hall	9 August 1999	N/A
Katherine uncovers a bitter family battle raging over the care of a patient, and her investigations into a colleague's behaviour again bring her into conflict with Dr. Blake.
5	"Soul and Conscience"	Morag Fullerton	Andrea Earl	16 August 1999	N/A
Katherine battles to save the life of an overdose victim determined to die.
6	"The Undiscovered Country"	Morag Fullerton	Ashley Pharoah	23 August 1999	N/A
Katherine feels she is making a real difference at the Caledonian. She helps a woman with motor-neurone disease and arbitrates between a patient's wife and mistress. But after an almost perfect day at Loch Lomond, she faces the hardest ethical decision of her life.
