= When Brendan Met Trudy =

- Directed by: Kieron J. Walsh
- Written by: Roddy Doyle
- Produced by: Lynda Myles
- Starring: Peter McDonald; Flora Montgomery
- Cinematography: Ashley Rowe
- Edited by: Scott Thomas
- Music by: Richard Hartley
- Production company: Deadly Films 2
- Release dates: September 12, 2000 (Toronto International Film Festival); March 9, 2001 (Ireland)
- Running time: 95 minutes
- Country: Ireland
- Language: English
- Budget: $5 million.

When Brendan Met Trudy is a 2000 Irish film directed by Kieron J. Walsh and starring Peter McDonald and Flora Montgomery. It was written by Roddy Doyle. The screenplay concerns a Dublin schoolteacher who falls in love with a mysterious young woman who turns out to be a thief.

== Plot ==
Brendan (Peter McDonald) is a shy, reserved teacher who takes his profession seriously. Away from the classroom, he has a love of films and classical music. One night, after practicing with his church choir, he meets Trudy (Flora Montgomery), a bright, witty and free-spirited woman whom he believes is a Montessori teacher. Despite the differences in their personalities, the two begin a relationship. Brendan is unaware that his new girlfriend is actually a burglar, and is shocked when Trudy asks him to prove his love by helping her on one of her 'jobs'. Brendan is torn between his feelings for Trudy, and the desire to do what is right. Throughout his relationship with her, Brendan slowly begins to discover himself, and realise that there is more to life than music and movies.

== Cast ==
- Peter McDonald as Brendan
- Flora Montgomery as Trudy
- Maynard Eziashi as Edgar
- Marie Mullen as Mother
- Pauline McLynn as Nuala
- Don Wycherley as Niall
- Eileen Walsh as Siobhán
- Barry Cassin as Headmaster
- Robert O'Neill as Dylan

== Production ==
According to producer Lynda Myles, the film was "modestly budgeted" with Variety magazine estimating the production budget at $5 million. The film received funding from BBC Films, followed by The Irish Film Board RTÉ, and Section 481 finance.

Peter McDonald, was cast as the lead following up on his impressive film debut as Brendan Gleeson's sidekick, Git, in I Went Down. Many actors were seen for the role but the producers were impressed by Flora Montgomery and cast her in her first cinema role.

The scene where Brendan and Trudy first meet was filmed in Kavanagh's bar in Stoneybatter. The Ormonde cinema in Stillorgan, Co Dublin, was used for the scene where Brendan goes to see Once Upon a Time in the West, the Savoy and the Ambassador on O'Connell Street served as cinema exteriors.

== Reception ==
The film received mixed reviews. Review aggregation website Rotten Tomatoes gives the film a score of 61% based on reviews from 62 critics. The site's consensus was "The references to other films are rather overdone, and the direction is uneven". Metacritic gives the film a score of 53% based on reviews from 25 critics.

Reviewing the film for the BBC, George Perry gives it 3/5 stars. Perry described the film as an agreeable comedy, full of in-jokes for film buffs, and plenty of non-film related delights too. He concludes "Under Kieron J Walsh's direction this is a sprightly 'odd couple' yarn brimming with sweet Irish charm."

Peter Bradshaw describes the film as "ordinary piece of work from Roddy Doyle" a standard rom-com, calling it "dull enough to qualify as an honorary British film".

Roger Ebert gave the film 3 out of 4 stars. Ebert says you will likely enjoy the film more if you get the film references but whether you do the film still works. Emanuel Levy of Variety magazine called it an "intermittently funny movie anchored by strong performances" but he says the "writing and direction are uneven".

The film grossed £200,000 from 30 screens in its debut in Ireland.
