= Lesley Conroy =

Irish actress screenwriter and director

- Born: 1973 or 1974 (age 51–52); County Cork, Ireland
- Education: University College Cork (BA); Trinity College Dublin
- Occupations: Actress, director, screenwriter

Lesley Conroy (born 1973 or 1974) is an Irish actress, director and screenwriter. She is known for her parts in Fair City and Mattie.

== Background ==
Conroy is a fluent Irish speaker from County Cork. She graduated from University College Cork in 1993 with a BA in English and French. and is a graduate of Trinity College Dublin's Samuel Beckett centre.

== Career ==
In 2008 Conroy featured in the film Eden. She came to prominence opposite Pat Shortt in Mattie. She worked with Shortt again in the 2013 feature Life's a Breeze. She joined the cast of Fair City in 2017. She starred in the short film Cleaner which she wrote and directed.

== Writing ==
Conroy won the Scripts Ireland short film script competition in 2020 for Cleaner.

== Filmography ==
Title	Year	Notes
My Brother's War	1997	
Saltwater	2000	
Eden	2008	Nominated for IFTA Award for Best Supporting Actress
Mattie	2009–2010	Television series
Life's a Breeze	2013	
The Cured	2017	
Fair City	2017–2018	Television series
Cleaner	2020	Short film. Also wrote and directed.
