= Kerry babies case =

1984 criminal case in Ireland

Locations associated with the Kerry Babies case

The Kerry babies case (Irish: Cás Leanaí Chiarraí) was a 1984 investigation by An Garda Síochána in County Kerry, Ireland, into the killing of a newborn baby, known as Baby John, and the alleged killing of another. The case has been the subject of intense media interest in Ireland and abroad in the following decades. It was the subject of a 3-part 2023 Channel 4 documentary Murdered: The Baby On The Beach, which was broadcast throughout the United Kingdom. The mother who concealed the second baby, Joanne Hayes, was arrested and charged with the murder of Baby John, of which she was wrongly thought to be the mother.

The Gardaí were forced to drop the charges six months later and a tribunal of inquiry (the "Kerry Babies Tribunal") was launched. Its report was highly critical of numerous failings in the Garda investigation, and it also concluded that Hayes had given birth to a live baby boy who died that night and whose birth was concealed. Hayes has disputed these findings and no charges were pressed.

The parents of Baby John were identified by DNA after their arrests in 2023. A Garda file was sent to the DPP in 2026 but no charges have yet been filed. Their solicitor had complained repeatedly about their treatment but has said nothing about Baby John.

In 2020, the Irish State formally apologised after 36 years to Joanne Hayes for wrongly accusing her of the murder and for the "appalling hurt and distress caused". The state consented to the making of the declarations by the High Court that all findings of wrongdoing made against them by the Tribunal were "unfounded and incorrect" and that their arrest and prosecution had been "unfounded and in breach of their constitutional rights".

== Events ==
On 14 April 1984, a newborn baby boy was found dead with a broken neck and 28 stab wounds. The body was discovered on White Strand, a beach near Caherciveen in the south of County Kerry in the south-west of Ireland. A woman, Joanne Hayes from Abbeydorney, approximately 80 kilometres (50 miles) away, who was known to have been pregnant, was arrested. She and her family confessed to the murder of the baby but later withdrew their confessions and admitted instead that Hayes's baby had been born on the family farm, had died shortly after birth, and had been wrapped in a plastic bag and buried on the farm in secret. Initially, An Garda Síochána, the police force in Ireland, conducted a search and declared that no body had been found and that the family's confessions were the true account of what had happened. It was only when a more thorough search was conducted that the body of a baby boy was discovered on the farm.

Tests showed that this baby had the same blood type, type O, as Hayes and the baby's (married) father, Jeremiah Locke. However, the baby on the beach had blood group A. The Gardaí nevertheless insisted that Hayes had become pregnant simultaneously by two different men (through heteropaternal superfecundation) and had given birth to both children, killing the one found on the beach. Another theory put forward was that the baby's blood type had changed due to decomposition.

Joanne Hayes was charged with murder but the charge was struck out on the instructions of the DPP in October 1984. In December 1984, the Kerry Babies Tribunal, headed by Mr Justice Kevin Lynch, was set up by the Oireachtas to investigate; (a) the facts and circumstances leading to criminal charges against members of the Hayes family in relation to the death of a baby boy (b) allegations by members of the Hayes family against the investigating Gardaí, and (c) any matters the Tribunal considered necessary to investigate in connection with the first two issues.

In the Tribunal's report, Mr Justice Lynch found that Joanne Hayes was not the mother of the Caherciveen baby but had given birth to a baby boy at her family home. The Tribunal found that her baby had died after she tried to stop it crying by choking it, despite state pathologist Dr John Harbison's inability to determine the cause of death. The Tribunal Report was highly critical of the Garda investigation, especially the failure to find the baby buried on the Hayes farm, and scathing of the Garda report on the investigation, parts of which "were completely inconsistent with the realities of the case" and "classic examples of...double-think" but the Tribunal rejected claims by the Hayes family that they had been assaulted by Gardaí and that the confessions were obtained through coercion. Joanne Hayes had claimed that Gardaí slapped, threatened, and coerced her into making a false confession, and other family members had alleged that Gardaí used harassment and physical intimidation to get false confessions. Gene Kerrigan commented in 2006, "In the opinion of some, the report never convincingly explained how people who were entirely innocent of any involvement whatever in stabbing a baby should make very detailed confessions that fitted into the facts of the baby found on the beach." The case was also noteworthy for having a psychiatrist admit under oath that the definition of sociopath he had used to describe Joanne Hayes in his testimony would apply to "about half the population of the country".

== Repercussions ==
The case raised serious questions about the culture of the Garda Síochána, and the treatment of unmarried mothers in Irish society. Journalist Nell McCafferty's book about the case was titled A Woman to Blame. Joanne Hayes co-wrote a book with John Barrett about her experience called My Story. Four Gardaí on the case took legal action against the authors and publishers of the book, as well as shops that sold it. They received out-of-court settlements totalling over €127,000.

In the aftermath of the case, the murder squad was disbanded, and the four Gardaí assigned to desk duties, in what was seen as a demotion. In 2004, Joanne Hayes offered to undergo a DNA test to establish that she was not the mother of the baby on the beach. Additionally, one of the officers on the case, Gerry O'Carroll, also sought such a test, saying that he believed the tests would prove the superfecundation theory correct.

The killer of the baby on the beach, later named "Baby John", has never been identified. The gravesite has been repeatedly vandalised, but no suspect has ever been identified for this either. In March 2023, a man and a woman were arrested in connection with the case, with DNA proving they were the parents of Baby John.

== Case review ==
A Garda review of the DNA evidence announced on 16 January 2018, confirmed that Joanne Hayes was not the mother of the infant found at White Strand. Irish national media reported that Acting Garda Commissioner Dónall Ó Cualáin offered a full verbal and written apology to Joanne Hayes. This was followed by an apology from the Minister for Justice, Charlie Flanagan and the Taoiseach, Leo Varadkar.

A new investigation into the circumstances of Baby John's death was also launched. In September 2018 it was reported that Gardaí were following up on aspects of the original investigation and engaged in house-to-house inquiries on Valentia Island (the island opposite the beach on which Baby John was discovered), as "part of the general investigation".

In 2020 the State apologised to Joanne Hayes and the Hayes family for their treatment at the hands of the Gardaí and for the false accusations that were levelled at them. Substantial compensation was paid by the state after the family launched proceedings to establish that the findings of wrongdoings by them in the tribunal were unfounded and incorrect. In a unique Declaration, the High Court declare No criminal proceedings have yet been brought against any of the Gardaí involved.

On the morning of 14 September 2021, the remains of Baby John were exhumed by Gardaí at Holy Cross Cemetery, Caherciveen, County Kerry. The baby's remains were taken to the morgue at University Hospital Kerry in Tralee, for examination as part of the ongoing investigation.

On 23 March 2023, Gardaí announced that a man in his 60s and a woman in her 50s had been arrested on suspicion of murder in Munster and were being held at Garda stations in relation to the case. DNA tests proved they were the biological parents of Baby John. The couple were released shortly after without charge, although they remained central to the investigation. In April 2026, a file was submitted to the Director of Public Prosecutions.

== In popular culture ==
In 2016, the Kerry babies case was the subject of a film titled Out of Innocence starring Fiona Shaw and Alun Armstrong and distributed by Mbur Indie Film Distribution. A 2019 scholarly article suggests that unfamiliarity with the poorly-documented "killeen" (or "Cillín") custom (the burial of stillborn babies in unconsecrated ground, which was once prevalent in Kerry) may have been a factor in the case.

The 2006 novel A Swift Pure Cry by Irish writer Siobhan Dowd is partly inspired by the case of the Kerry babies as well as the case of Irish teenager Ann Lovett which also occurred in 1984.

In December 2023, the UK television Channel 4 broadcast a documentary of three episodes."Murdered: The baby on the beach".

== See also ==
- List of unsolved deaths
- Carlisle buried baby case – A similar baby burial case in Ohio, involving a teenage mother.
