= Ann (film) =

- Directed by: Ciaran Creagh
- Written by: Ciaran Creagh
- Produced by: Ciaran Creagh; Ferdia Doherty; Niall Flynn
- Starring: Zara Devlin; Eileen Walsh; Ian Beattie
- Cinematography: Dave Grennan
- Edited by: Tony Cranstoun
- Music by: Roger Taylor
- Release dates: November 17, 2022 (Tallinn Black Nights Film Festival); April 28, 2023 (Ireland)
- Running time: 90 minutes
- Country: Ireland
- Language: English

Ann is a 2022 Irish drama film written and directed by Ciaran Creagh and starring Zara Devlin as Ann Lovett. It is a dramatization of Lovett's last day of her life.

== Cast ==
- Zara Devlin as Ann
- Eileen Walsh as Patricia Sr
- Ian Beattie as Diarmuid
- Senna O’Hara as Patricia Jr
- Joe Mullins as Maguire
- Darragh Gilhooly as Ricky
- Molly Mew as Brenda
- Frank O’Sullivan as Retired Guard
- Sean T. O’Meallaigh as The Doctor
- Philip Judge as The Priest

== Production ==
The film was shot in Boyle, County Roscommon during the summer of 2021.

== Release ==
The film premiered at the Tallinn Black Nights Film Festival in November 2022. Then the film was released by Omniplex Cinemas in Longford and Roscommon on April 28, 2023.

== Reception ==
Declan Burke of the Irish Examiner awarded the film four stars out of five. Donald Clarke of The Irish Times awarded the film three stars out of five.

Amber Wilkinson of Screen Daily gave the film a positive review and wrote, "Devlin has very little dialogue but conveys Ann’s sense of fear and isolation through body language."

== Nominations ==
At the 19th Irish Film & Television Awards, Devlin and Walsh were nominated for Best Actress and Best Supporting Actress respectively for their performances in the film.
