= Kerry International Film Festival =

Annual film festival in Ireland

- Location: Killarney and other towns, County Kerry, Ireland
- Founded: 2000
- Festival date: October
- Language: English, Irish and others
- Website: kerryfilmfestival.com

The Kerry International Film Festival (Irish: Féile Scannán Idirnáisiúnta Chiarraí) is an annual film festival that takes place in County Kerry, Ireland, during October / November. The Kerry Film Festival is funded by Kerry County Council, Fáilte Ireland, the Arts Council as well as having corporate sponsorship.

== History ==
Kerry Film Festival was established in 2000 but remained a small regional festival throughout its first years, with 1,700 attendees at the 2006 festival. Then, in 2007, under new management the festival exploded becoming the fastest growing festival in all of Ireland, with audiences numbers increasing by nearly 600% over the coming years. In 2011 the audience topped 10,000 for the first time, with more than 20,000 attendees at various screenings and workshops throughout the year.

Kerry Film Festival screens a comprehensive selection of short films (International, Irish, Kerry, Student, Animation). The festival also screens carefully curated feature films, both narrative and documentary. Many of these screenings feature Q & A sessions afterwards.

Kerry Film Festival seeks to bring the film-making community together for workshops and industry days. One of the main events is the Irish Film and Television Awards hosted industry networking event which brings key industry personnel together.

== Short Film Competition ==
In 2007 the Kerry Film Festival pivoted to focus primarily on a number of short film competitions. To do so the festival lined up a number of A-List adjudicators.

Gabriel Byrne headed up the adjudication panel in 2007, while Liam Neeson headed up the panel in 2008. Other adjudicators in 2008 included John Carney, director of Once, and Kirsten Sheridan, director of Disco Pigs and Academy Award nominated writer for the semi-autobiographical film In America.

In 2010, the adjudication panel was headed up by Jeremy Irons, and Michael Fassbender. While Cillian Murphy and Paul Greengrass were members of the adjudication panel in 2011.

Other adjudicators have included Jim Cummings and Benjamin Cleary. The festival also screens feature films.

Many films seen at Kerry Film Festival went on to garner international acclaim, including 2010 Academy Award short-listed Granny O’ Grimm's Sleeping Beauty and The Door; 2012 Oscar® short-listed Head Over Heels; 2014 Oscar® winner Mr. Hublot; 2016 Oscar® winner Stutterer and 2019 Oscar® nominees Mother and Detainment.

KFF has previously featured successful short films such as the Oscar short-listed animation Head over Heels in 2012, the 2014 Oscar winner Mr. Hublot and in 2015 the highly acclaimed Academy Award winner S t u t t e r e r by Ben Cleary. An Irish Goodbye screened at KIFF 2022 and won the Oscar for the Best Short Film in 2023.

== The Maureen O'Hara Award ==
=== History ===
Kerry Film Festival announced the Maureen O’Hara Award in 2007. It was the first named film award in Ireland and one of the earliest film awards anywhere in the world presented specifically to women who have excelled in their chosen fields. It was presented for the first time at the 2008 Kerry Film Festival. According to a spokesman, "The Maureen O'Hara Award acknowledges women that have demonstrated outstanding leadership in their respective fields."

Brenda Fricker was the inaugural recipient. The award was presented to her by Jim Sheridan, who directed her in the Oscar-winning My Left Foot (1989).

The prize itself was specially commissioned piece of pottery of joined masks representing tragedy and comedy, made by master potter Louis Mulcahy. The award was "an honour, a privilege, a delight," she said, following the presentation.

Maureen O'Hara wanted to be at the ceremony but was not well enough to attend, chairman of the Kerry Film Festival John Kennedy said. She had been closely involved and sent a message to the ceremony: "Brenda has displayed courage and determination throughout her career and her Oscar Winning role as Mrs Brown in My Left Footis one of the great highlights in Irish acting. I'm absolutely delighted that Brenda will accept this award and I wish her the very best in her career, in film and, most importantly, in her life," O'Hara said. The festival hosted a screening of the John Wayne film The Quiet Man that co-starred Maureen O'Hara.

Maureen O’Hara attended the festival to present the Award to Juliette Binoche in 2010.

=== Recipients ===
- 2008 - Brenda Fricker
- 2009 - Rebecca Miller
- 2010 - Juliette Binoche
- 2011 - Fionnula Flanagan
- 2012 - Saoirse Ronan
- 2013 - Consolata Boyle
- 2014 - Sarah Elizabeth Jones
- 2017 - Emer Reynolds
- 2018 - Deirdre O'Kane
- 2019 - Bronagh Gallagher
- 2020 - Jessie Buckley
- 2021 - Kathleen Kennedy
- 2022 - Amy Huberman
- 2023 - Eileen Walsh
- 2024 - Rebecca O'Flanagan
- 2025 - Fiona Shaw

== Secret Cine Club ==
In 2013, Kerry Film Festival launched the Secret Cine Club that screened "secret" movies in a "secret" location. The first screening took place on Little Samphire Island, off the coast of Fenit. The first film screened was Jaws.

Other screenings have included films shown in Dingle Court House, a school, an organic farm and screenings in Listowel, Dingle and Killarney as well as in Cahersiveen and various locations around Tralee.
