= Death of Ann Lovett =

Irish schoolgirl (1968–1984)

- Date: 31 January 1984
- Location: Granard, County Longford, Ireland
- Cause: Postpartum haemorrhage
- Deaths: Mother and son

Ann Rose Lovett (6 April 1968 – 31 January 1984) was a 15-year-old schoolgirl from Granard, County Longford, Ireland, who died giving birth beside a grotto on 31 January 1984. Her baby son died at the same time and the story of her death played a huge part in a seminal national debate on women giving birth outside marriage.

== Family background ==
Ann Rose Lovett was born on 6 April 1968 in Cóbh General Hospital (now Cóbh Community Hospital) on Aileen Terrace in Cóbh, a town on the south coast of County Cork. She was the seventh of nine children (three girls and six boys). Her father, Diarmuid Lovett, was raised in Kilnaleck, a village in the south-south-west of County Cavan (but may have been born in Ballyshannon in south County Donegal). Her mother was Patricia Lovett (née McNamee), and was born in Dublin. Diarmuid had moved to Cóbh for work, and the family lived in Graham's Terrace in the town, a row of Victorian houses directly overlooking the harbour.

In 1972, the family moved back to Diarmuid's native Kilnaleck, where he ran a building firm. They moved again in 1981, this time to nearby Granard, a small town in County Longford where Diarmuid had purchased The Copper Pot, a pub on the Main Street. The family lived in premises immediately above the pub. While working as the landlord at The Copper Pot, Diarmuid occasionally also returned to work as a carpenter. It seems that the pub was not a success under Diarmuid's management, with the pub rarely being open and Diarmuid being unemployed much of the time. Diarmuid and his wife Patricia would live out their lives in Granard; Diarmuid died in August 1987 aged 54, following a stroke, while Patricia died in June 2015 aged 81.

== Events ==
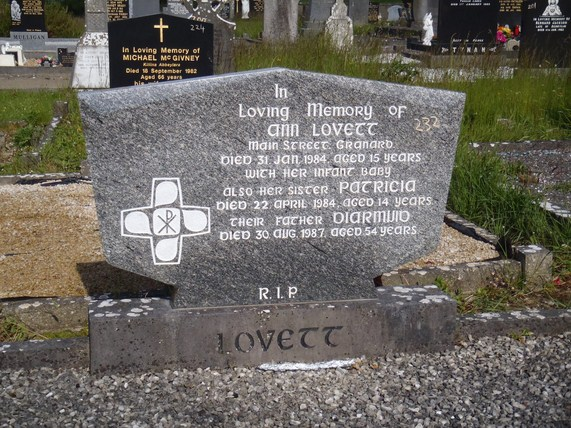
Ann Lovett's grave, Granardkill Graveyard in 2011.

On the afternoon of Tuesday 31 January 1984, in Granard, County Longford, fifteen-year-old Lovett left her Catholic Cnoc Mhuire Secondary School and made her way to a grotto dedicated to the Virgin Mary at the top of the town, where she gave birth to her son.

At around 4 pm that day, some children on their way home from school saw Lovett's schoolbag on the ground and discovered her lying in the grotto. They alerted a passing farmer, who rushed to the nearby Parochial House to inform the parish priest of the discovery of Lovett and her already deceased baby in the adjacent grotto. The response of the priest, Francis Canon Gilfillan, to his request for help was; "It's a doctor you need".

Lovett, still alive but haemorrhaging heavily, was carried to Gilfillan's house, from where a doctor was phoned. She was then driven in the doctor's car to her parents' house in the centre of the town. Lovett died by the time the ambulance arrived.

Lovett and her child were quietly buried three days later in Granardkill cemetery.

== Media reaction ==
A quarter of a century on from a tragedy that shocked the nation, many questions remain unanswered about the deaths of Ann Lovett and her infant child.

— Ali Bracken,

On Saturday 4 February, Ireland's most popular television show, The Late Late Show, was coming to an end, when host Gay Byrne read a headline from the next day's Sunday Tribune newspaper: "Girl, 15, Dies Giving Birth in a Field". Reacting with "My goodness me, and that happened in County Longford apparently", he continued reading the other headlines in the newspaper before commenting, "nothing terribly exciting there", and dropping the newspaper onto the studio floor.

A phone call had been made to the newspaper by an anonymous caller from Granard, and the story, broken in the Sunday Tribune by Emily O'Reilly, drew national attention of Lovett's case.

The story left many asking how such a thing could happen. For others it was an opportunity to finally reveal similar stories that had remained hidden for decades. The Gay Byrne Show on RTÉ Radio 1 began to receive letters from all over the country – "Too many letters. They couldn't be ignored."

== Local reaction ==
The local community and clergy, including the order of nuns at the school which Lovett had attended, released a statement denying any knowledge of her pregnancy. While the statement issued by the nuns, following legal advice, said they "did not know" about her pregnancy, they subsequently refused to confirm whether they had suspected it or not.

Rumours also circulated regarding the identity of the child's father and Lovett's difficult family circumstances. Many residents of Granard accused the media of being overly intrusive and of wrongly attaching blame to the community for the tragedy.

In National Archives of Ireland documents released in December 2014, a letter was revealed, written by the Roman Catholic Archdiocese of Armagh to poet Christopher Daybell, which claimed Lovett's "sad death reflects more on her immaturity than on any lack of Christian charity".

== Inquest and enquiries ==
An inquest was held in Mullingar a few weeks later and found that Lovett's death was due to irreversible shock caused by haemorrhage and exposure during childbirth.

The inquest also confirmed that, contrary to claims from the local community, some people did indeed know about her pregnancy before her death.

Subsequent enquiries by the Gardaí, the Department of Education and the Midlands Health Board, have yet to be published.

== Aftermath ==
Lovett's death came just four months after the outcome of a divisive abortion referendum in the Ireland in which a two-thirds majority voted to enshrine the right to life of the unborn in the Constitution of Ireland, creating confusion over where that left the rights of the mother.

On 22 April 1984, less than three months after Ann's death, her sister Patricia died by suicide at the age of 14.

In the ensuing public debate, Lovett's death became symbolic of the emerging clash between church and state.

In the run-up to the 2018 Irish abortion referendum, the case was again remembered. After publishing an extensive piece in March 2018 retracing the facts of the case, on 5 May The Irish Times carried a detailed interview with Richard McDonnell, Lovett's former boyfriend, coming forward for the first time and discussing the circumstances of their lives and their relationship. McDonnell stated that he first met Ann when he was 15 years old in her father's pub, The Copper Pot. She was 13 years old. They began a sexual relationship after she turned 14.

According to McDonnell, their close and loving relationship had foundered when Lovett had found it difficult to continue, after she had come to him one night in late April 1983, apparently having suffered a serious assault and beating. He told The Irish Times that Ann appeared to be distressed, showing him her thighs, which were marked with bruises and scrapes. Lovett then pleaded with McDonnell not to tell anybody. He asked Ann repeatedly if she had been raped, to which she did not reply.

In October of that year, McDonnell explained that he became aware of the rumours around Granard that Ann was pregnant and confronted her with his doubts. She denied categorically that she was pregnant, laughing it off, and claimed she had gained weight.

According to McDonnell, immediately following Ann's funeral, Lovett's mother and sister gave him a letter, which had been found addressed to him among Ann's possessions. The alleged letter, written by Ann on two sheets of paper, explained that she had "loved him dearly", and was "sorry for doing what she was going to do"; the reason being that nobody would believe he was the father of her child. McDonnell concluded that Ann, being strong willed and intelligent, went to the grotto alone to have the baby for a reason, in a deliberate act of "protest".

McDonnell alleged that a Granard-based priest, Father John Quinn, upon learning of the letter, demanded to read it, and then told McDonnell to burn it, because it would "destroy the town" if its contents became known. According to McDonnell, another letter written by Ann, which was unaddressed, had also been found among her possessions, its opening line described by one of Ann's friends who had read it as "If I'm not dead by the 31st of January, I'm going to kill myself anyway".

McDonnell further told The Irish Times that, at the request of Granard gardaí, McDonnell's mother was to escort him be interviewed by local authorities. However, when he gave his statement to Detective Garda John Murren, he was allegedly alone and unaccompanied by a guardian or legal counsel. According to McDonnell, Father Quinn then brought him to the palace of Colm O'Reilly, then Bishop of Ardagh and Clonmacnoise, who wanted to know what he had told the Garda Síochána. Bishop O’Reilly was alleged to have ordered him to kiss his ring, describing it as the seal of St Peter, and swore him to a vow of silence. Bishop O'Reilly told The Irish Times in a statement that he had never met McDonnell.

McDonnell lived out his life uncertain about the paternity of the child and their deaths.

== Documentaries ==
Twelve years after Ann's death, Lorelei Harris, a producer on the Gay Byrne programme, decided to make a radio documentary on the letters sent to the show in the immediate aftermath of the Granard tragedy.

She sought the opinions of local people on Lovett's pregnancy and death. Journalists and broadcasters also talked about their experiences at the time. Contributors to this documentary include Emily O'Reilly, Kevin O'Connor and people from Granard. The "Letters to Ann" were read by Aidan Matthews and John MacKenna, with Ann-Marie Horan reading from the original Gay Byrne show letters.

== Artistic response ==
=== Music ===
- "Strange Girl" – Paranoid Visions (1984): Recorded and released in the year of Ann Lovett's death, the song has been re-recorded a number of times and is featured on the band's Black Operations In The Red Mist CD.
- "Girl in the Ghetto" – Cry Before Dawn (October 1987): Originally written as "Girl in the Grotto", the song is a reflection on the Ann Lovett story.
- "Middle of the Island" – Christy Moore (1989): The song also appears under the title "Ann Lovett" in the Christy Moore Box Set and is additionally known by the name of its refrain, "Everybody knew, nobody said." First released on his album Voyage, this song written by Nigel Rolfe reflects on the society in which Ann Lovett lived and how she could have died in such circumstances. Moore also used the refrain in as the introduction to "The Well" in a live recording from Glastonbury Festival on the 1999 album Traveller.
- "(They Were) Deaf to Her Child's Cries" – Jj Kikola (2014): The song is written in memory of Ann and her child, and was released along with a music video two weeks before the 30th anniversary of their deaths. Kikola stated in an interview that he had been motivated to write the song because the event had become largely unknown to the younger generation in Ireland.
- "The Life and Soul" – Christy Moore (2024): The song appears on the album A Terrible Beauty and features anonymous spoken word from a memorial to Ann Lovett at Maynooth University.

=== Literature and film ===
- The 1991 Paula Meehan poem The Statue of the Virgin at Granard Speaks refers to the death of Ann Lovett and was shortlisted for the 2015 Poetry Competition "A Poem for Ireland".
- The 2006 novel A Swift Pure Cry by Irish author Siobhan Dowd was inspired by Ann Lovett's death and the Kerry Babies.
- The 2022 feature film Ann is a dramatisation of the last day of Lovett's life. The film was written and directed by Ciaran Creagh, with Zara Devlin as Lovett.
