= Janice Beard =

- Directed by: Clare Kilner
- Written by: Clare Kilner; Ben Hopkins
- Produced by: Judy Counihan
- Starring: Eileen Walsh; Rhys Ifans; Patsy Kensit
- Cinematography: Richard Greatrex; Peter Thwaites
- Edited by: Mary Finlay
- Music by: Paul Carr
- Release dates: 29 October 1999 (Italy); 5 May 2000 (United Kingdom)
- Running time: 81 minutes
- Countries: United Kingdom; Italy
- Language: English

Janice Beard (also known as Janice Beard 45 WPM), is a 1999 film directed by Clare Kilner. It stars Eileen Walsh, Rhys Ifans and Patsy Kensit. It was nominated for awards in 1999, 2000 and 2002.

== Plot ==
Janice Beard is a Scottish woman who moves to London in hopes of making enough money to treat her mother's agoraphobia. She lands a job at Kendon Motors, which is working on a new automobile. The movie centers on her relationship with co-worker Sean who is actually an industrial saboteur intent on thwarting Kendon's new car.

== Cast ==
- Eileen Walsh as Janice Beard
- Rhys Ifans as Sean
- Patsy Kensit as Julia
- Sandra Voe as Mimi
- David O'Hara as O'Brien
- Frances Grey as Violet
- Zita Sattar as Jane
- Amelia Curtis as June
- Mossie Smith as Dolores
- Eddie Marsan as Mr. Tense
- Perry Fenwick as Mr. Button

== Reception ==
Stephen Holden described the film as "whimsical" and "quirky" and admired its depiction of corporate life "at the bottom of the ladder".
