= Float Like a Butterfly =

Irish drama film directed by Carmel Winters

- Film poster
- Directed by: Carmel Winters
- Written by: Carmel Winters
- Produced by: David Collins; Martina Niland
- Starring: Hazel Doupe; Dara Devaney; Johnny Collins
- Cinematography: Michael Lavelle
- Edited by: Julian Ulrichs
- Production companies: Samson Films; Port Pictures
- Release date: 7 September 2018 (TIFF)
- Country: Ireland
- Language: English

Float Like a Butterfly is a 2018 Irish drama film directed by Carmel Winters. The film stars Hazel Doupe as Frances, a young Irish Traveller girl who idolizes Muhammad Ali and aspires to become a boxer.

The film premiered at the 2018 Toronto International Film Festival, where it won the FIPRESCI Discovery Prize.

== Critical reception ==
On the review aggregator website Rotten Tomatoes, 88% of 16 critics' reviews are positive.
