= Gary Whelan =

Irish actor (born 1953)

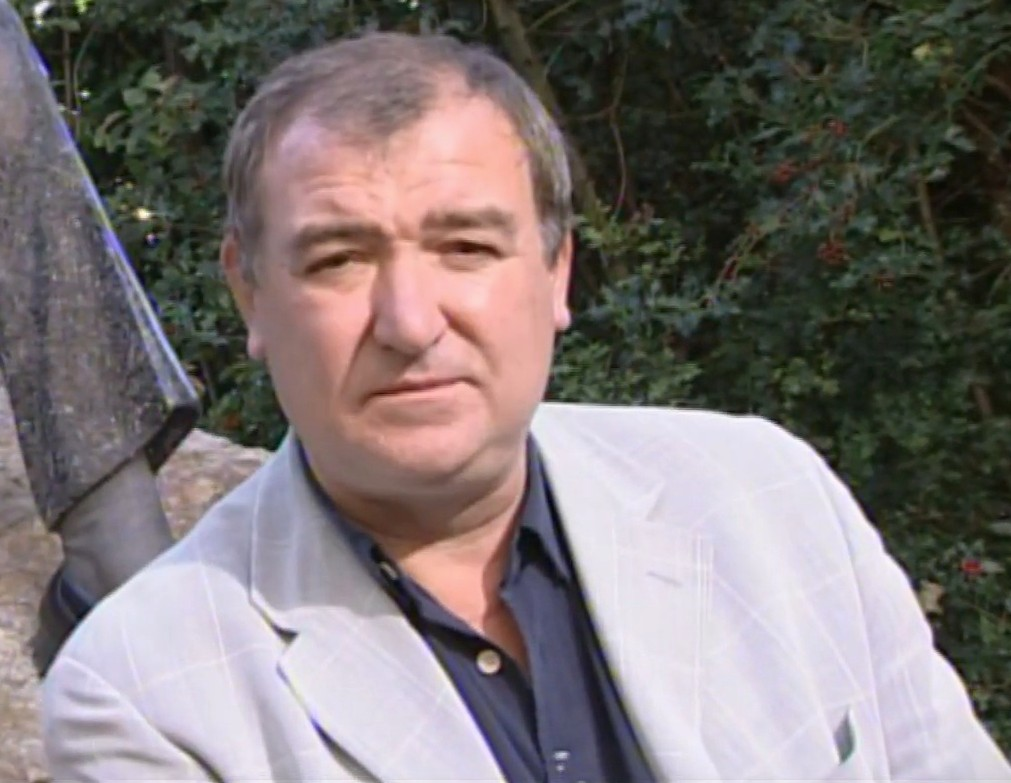
- Whelan in 2022
- Born: 1953 (age 72–73); Dublin, Ireland

Gary Whelan (born 1953) is an Irish actor, known for his work on British television.

== Early life ==
Whelan was born in Ireland but he relocated to London when he was ten years old. He then attended Holloway School.

== Acting ==
He has portrayed several roles in the police force. He has twice featured in the BBC soap opera EastEnders, once as DS Terry Rich from 1985 to 1987, and later as DS Paul Kemmit in the spin-off EastEnders: Perfectly Frank in 2003. He played DS Terry Amson with Helen Mirren in Prime Suspect (1991), D.I Kent in Brookside, D.I. Harry Haines in the ITV drama, The Bill (1992–1995), and he also played a policeman in the film Bernard and the Genie (1991).

He also played Brendan Kearney, the village schoolmaster in Ballykissangel (1996–2001), and Danny Parsons, the unscrupulous (fictional) manager of pop group S Club 7 in their debut TV series Miami 7 (1999).

On stage Whelan has played Horatio in Hamlet and Salisbury in Richard II. He has also appeared in two of the Pink Panther movies, and his other film credits include Cry Freedom, Paper Marriage, Moll Flanders, and Michael Collins. Recent film roles were O'Connor in Villa des Roses (2002), and Declan Murphy in A Flight of Fancy (200).

Among Whelan's other television credits are Glenroe, Angels, Hideaway, Minder, The Royal, and Kavanagh QC. Gary has also been seen in the roles of Sam Tilley in Uncle Silas and Charlie Pearch in In Deep. In 2005 he appeared in the BBC hospital drama Casualty@Holby City, and in 2006 he starred in Channel 4's Goldplated.

== Personal life ==
Whelan lived in Brighton and owned its popular Lion & Lobster pub from 2001 until 2014 when he sold it to a pub chain for £4.5 million and moved to Dublin.

He currently owns the Walrus pub in Brighton and the Dalkey Duck pub in Dublin. and The Wild Duck in Temple Bar, as well as The Flying Duck and SMASH IT burgers.

== Filmography ==
Year	Title	Role	Notes
1980	Babylon	CID Detective #2	
1982	Trail of the Pink Panther	4th Mafia Boss	
1983	Ascendancyy	Soldier	
1983	Curse of the Pink Panther	4th Mafia Boss	
1987	Zoeken naar Eileen	Marc Nolan	
1987	Cry Freedom	Police sergeant	
1992	Papierowe malzenstwo	Boss	
1992	The Bill	DS Haines	Episode: "Discipline"
1993-1995	The Bill	DI Harry Haines	Main cast, 20 episodes
1996	Moll Flanders	Prison Guard	
1996	Michael Collins	Hoey	
2001	One Up on Two	Postman	
2002	Villa des Roses	Mr. O'Connor	
2004	Beyond the Sea	Jules Podell	
2006	The Contract	Stanfield	
2008	Telstar: The Joe Meek Story	Detective	
2014	Dracula Untold	Lucian's Monk #3	
2016	Out of Innocence	Judge Griffin	
2023	All You Need Is Death	The Old King	
