= Declan Recks =

Irish film director

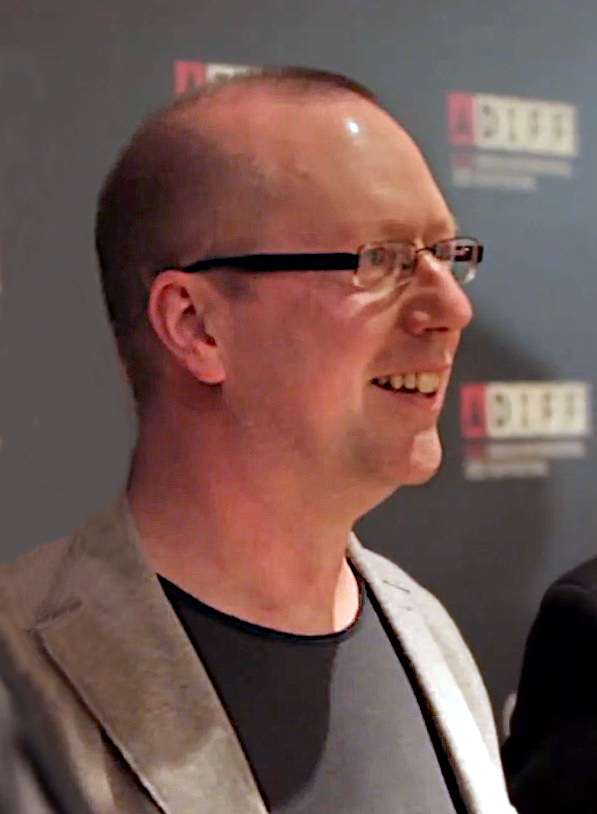
- Recks at diff 2016
- Education: Dun Laoghaire College of Art and Design
- Occupations: Director and Producer

Declan Recks is an IFTA Award-winning television and film director from Clara, County Offaly. He directed the Irish language film Tarrac in 2023.

== Education ==
Recks graduated from the Dun Laoghaire College of Art and Design in Dublin, Ireland.

== Career ==
In 1990, Recks founded Paradox Productions with Liam O'Niell. He sits the board of the Screen Directors Guild of Ireland (SDGI) and is a member of the European Film Academy.

== Filmography ==
- Director
  - Big Swinger, 1991 for ScreenPlay Firsts
  - Quando, 1997
  - Mystic Knights of Tir Na Nog, 1999
  - Pure Mule, 2005 (IFTA Award for Best Director - Television)
  - Eden, 2008
  - Three Wise Women, 2010 (Hallmark movie)
  - Scúp, 2014
  - 6Degrees, 2015
  - The Truth Commissioner, 2016
  - The Flag, 2017
  - Counsel, 2019
  - The South Westerlies, 2020
  - Red Election, 2021
  - Nova Jones, 2022
  - Tarrac, 2023
