= Aisling O'Sullivan =

Irish actress

Aisling O'Sullivan (born in Tralee, County Kerry) is an Irish actress.

== Career ==
O'Sullivan attended the Gaiety School of Acting in Dublin and joined the Abbey Theatre in 1991.

=== Theatre ===
In 2011 and 2012, she toured Ireland with Druid, playing the titular character in Big Maggie by John B. Keane.

At the National Theatre she played in Liolà, Mutabilitie, and The Cripple of Inishmaan.

=== Film and television ===
She played the grieving mother who commits suicide in Six Shooter, playwright Martin McDonagh's Oscar-winning short film.

She is familiar to Irish television audiences as Dr. Cathy Costello from Series 1 to Series 5 in the drama series The Clinic.

== Filmography ==
=== Film ===
Year	Title	Role	Notes
1996	Michael Collins	Girl in Bed	
1997	The Butcher Boy	Ma Brady	
1999	The War Zone	Carol	
2000	The Announcement	Liv	
2002	The One and Only	Jenny	
2003	The Actors	Rita	
2004	Six Shooter	Woman	
2008	A Film with Me in It	Policewoman	
2010	Snap	Sandra	
2016	The Secret Scripture	Eleanor Prunty	
2019	Dark Lies the Island	Phylis	
2022	Joyride	Mags	

=== Television ===
Year	Title	Role	Notes
1995	Runway One	Frances	Television film
1995	Cracker	Aileen	Episode: "Best Boys: Part 1"
1998	The American	Claire De Cintré	Television film
1999	Life Support	Dr. Katherine Doone	6 episodes
2000	The Wyvern Mystery	Vrau	Television film
2000	Shockers	Helena Turner	Episode: "Parent's Night"
2002	Me and Mrs Jones	Max	Television film
2003–2008	The Clinic	Dr. Cathy Costello	49 episodes
2005	The Baby War	Mary	Television film
2010–2013	Raw	Fiona Kelly	24 episodes
2021	Frank of Ireland	Maelbhina	Episode: "A Good Few Angry Women"
