= Eileen Walsh =

Irish actress

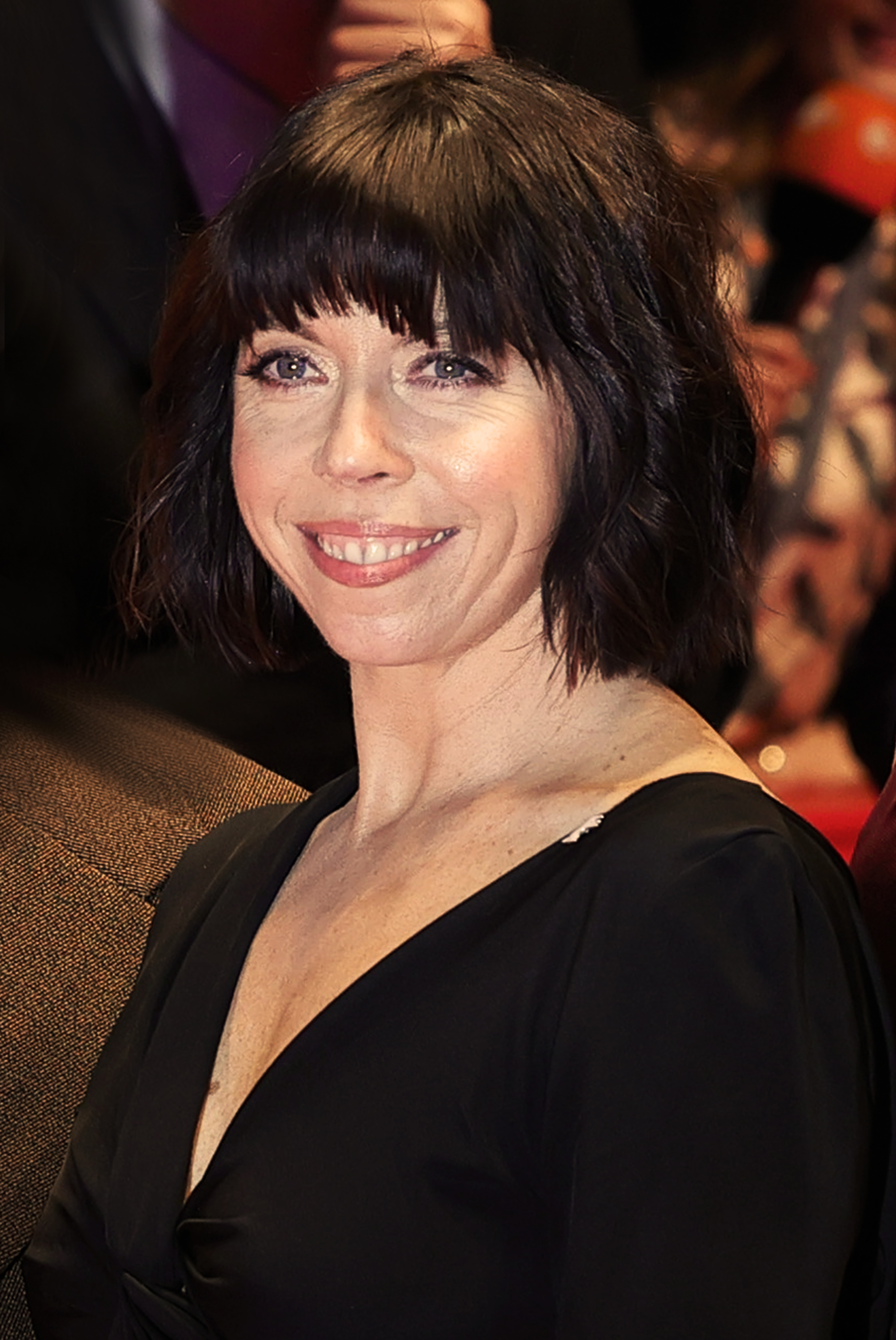
- Walsh at the 2024 Berlinale
- Born: 16 April 1977 (age 49); Cork, Ireland
- Occupation: Actress
- Years active: 1996–present

Eileen Walsh (born 16 April 1977) is an Irish actress. Her credits include Miss Julie (1999), Janice Beard 45 WPM (1999), When Brendan Met Trudy (2000), The Magdalene Sisters (2002), Pure Mule (2005), Eden (2008), The End (2008), Catastrophe (2015), The Children Act (2017), Maze (2017), Wolf (2021), and Ann (2022).

In 2023, Walsh was the recipient of the Kerry Film Festival (KIFF), Maureen O’Hara Award, a recognition of achievement for women who have excelled in film, TV and/or media.

== Biography ==
Born and raised in Cork, Ireland, Walsh was raised in a Catholic household, and had no intention of becoming an actress, until she followed in the footsteps of her elder sister Catherine, who was also an actress. A young Eileen began to attend theatre workshops and her first break came when, as a student, in 1996, she landed the role of Runt in the stage version of Disco Pigs, alongside Cillian Murphy, who played her friend. She was later heartbroken when losing that role to Elaine Cassidy in the 2001 film version.

She worked alongside Peter Mullan in Miss Julie (1999). In 1999, she played the titular character in Janice Beard 45 WPM, alongside Rhys Ifans, Patsy Kensit and Eddie Marsan. She starred in When Brendan Met Trudy (2000).

In 2002, she played the role of Crispina in The Magdalene Sisters, where her character was beaten and humiliated by nuns, forced to strip, and sexually abused by a Roman Catholic Priest. Her performance earned her a nomination for British Supporting Actress of the Year at the 2002 London Film Critics' Circle Awards.

She featured as Therese Farrell in Pure Mule (2005), and as Breda Farrell in the film Eden (2008), and the same year she played jessica in the short film The End.

In 2008, Walsh won the award for Best Actress at the Tribeca Film Festival for her portrayal of Breda, a lonely housewife whose willpower is put to the test in the film Eden.

Her film career continued with The Children Act (2017), Maze (2017), Wolf (2021), and Ann (2022).

In 2023, Walsh was the recipient of the Kerry Film Festival (KIFF), Maureen O’Hara Award, a recognition of achievement for women who have excelled in film, TV and/or media.

== Personal life ==
Walsh is married, lived in London (2009), and has two children.

== Filmography ==
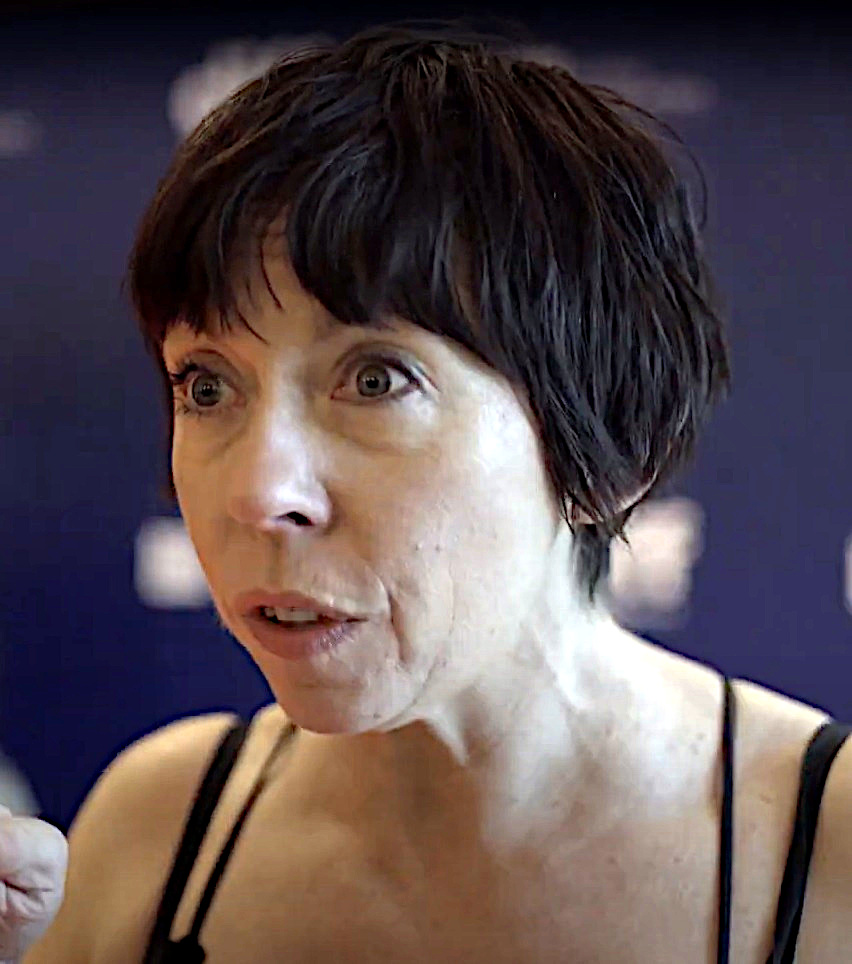
Walsh at the Dublin International Film Festival in 2023

Film
Year	Title	Role	Notes
1996	The Van	Crushed Girl	
1997	Messaggi quasi segreti	2nd Kid	
1997	The Last Bus Home	Carole	
1999	Miss Julie	Servant	
1999	Janice Beard 45 WPM	Janice Beard	
2000	When Brendan Met Trudy	Siobhan	
2001	Look	Trish	Short film
2002	The Magdalene Sisters	Crispina	
2002	Nicholas Nickleby	The Infant Phenomenon	
2005	33X Around the Sun	Ruth	
2008	Eden	Breda Farrell	
2008	The End	Jessica	Short film
2009	Triage	Dr. Christopher	
2009	The Ballad of Kid Kanturk	Mona	Short film
2010	Snap	Chris	
2017	The Children Act	Naomi Henry	
2017	Maze	Kate Marley	
2019	Rialto	Paula Grainger	
2021	Wolf	Dr. Angeli	
2022	Ann	Patricia	
2024	Small Things Like These	Eileen Furlong	

Television
Year	Title	Role	Notes
2003	Lula Fantastic	(voice)	TV short
2005	Pure Mule	Therese Farrell	5 episodes
2015–19	Catastrophe	Kate	6 episodes
2016	Can't Cope, Won't Cope	Pharmacist Geraldine O'Neill	Episode: "I Wanna Be Like You"
2016	Delicious	Marianne Khan	Episode: "Death Comes to All"
2017	On the Hemline	Martha	TV movie
2018	Patrick Melrose	Annette	2 episodes
2018	Women on the Verge	Alison	6 episodes
2020	The South Westerlies	Kate	6 episodes
2021	Modern Love	Lily De Courcy	Episode: "A Second Embrace, With Eyes Open"
2022	Death in Paradise	Orla Mills	Episode: "The Phone-In Murder"

Radio
Year	Title	Role	Notes
2022	Breathing Space	Ciara Fitzpatrick	Radio play by Dorothy Cotter

== Awards and nominations ==
Year	Award	Category	Work	Result	Ref.
2004	London Film Critics' Circle Award	British Supporting Actress of the Year	The Magdalene Sisters	Nominated	
2008	Tribeca Film Festival	Best Actress	Eden	Won	
2005	IFTA Film & Drama Awards	Best Supporting Actress in Television	Pure Mule	Won	
2009	IFTA Film & Drama Awards	Best Actress in a Leading Role Film	Eden	Won	
2011	IFTA Film & Drama Awards	Best Actress in a Supporting Role Film	Snap	Nominated	
2023	IFTA Film & Drama Awards	Best Supporting Actress - Film	Ann	Nominated	
2023	Kerry Film Festival	Maureen O’Hara Award	Women who have excelled in film, TV and/or media	Won	
