= Eden (2008 film) =

2008 Irish film

- Theatrical film poster
- Directed by: Declan Recks
- Written by: Eugene O'Brien
- Produced by: David Collins
- Starring: Eileen Walsh; Aidan Kelly; Pádraic Delaney; Sarah Greene; Karl Shiels; Lesley Conroy
- Cinematography: Owen McPolin
- Edited by: Gareth Young
- Music by: Stephen Rennicks
- Release dates: April 25, 2008 (Tribeca); May 30, 2008 (Ireland)
- Running time: 83 mins.
- Country: Ireland
- Language: English

Eden is a 2008 Irish drama film, directed by Declan Recks and written by Eugene O'Brien. It stars Eileen Walsh, Aidan Kelly, Pádraic Delaney, Lesley Conroy, Sarah Greene, and Karl Shiels. It premiered at the 2008 Tribeca Festival, and was subsequently released in Ireland that same year.

== Synopsis ==
A married couple's relationship begins to fall apart as their 10th wedding anniversary approaches.

== Cast ==
- Eileen Walsh as Breda Farrell
- Aidan Kelly as Billy Farrell
- Pádraic Delaney as Eoghan
- Karl Shiels as Breffni Grehan
- Lesley Conroy as Eilish Moore
- Sarah Greene as Imelda Egan
- Kate O'Toole as Yvonne Egan
- Gary Lilburn as Ernie Egan
- Michelle Beamish as Naomi
- Carolyn Murray as Edel Farrell
- Brendan Kelleher as James Farrell
- Leeona Duff as Amanda
- Gavin O'Connor as Dessie
- Katie McGrath as Dessie's Girlfriend

== Reception ==
On the review aggregator website Rotten Tomatoes, 72% of 25 critics' reviews are positive, with an average rating of 6.40/10. Metacritic, which uses a weighted average, assigned the film a score of 63 out of 100, based on 12 critics, indicating "generally favorable" reviews.

Brian Tallerico of Hollywood Chicago lauded leads Aidan Kelly and Eileen Walsh as being "simply fantastic". Kelly Vance of East Bay Express calls it a "quiet, carefully observed drama", likening it to the classic silent film, Sunrise: A Song of Two Humans (1927). Harvey O'Brien of Estudios Irlandeses complimented cinematographer Owen McPolin's "range of shots" throughout the film.

George Williamson of Eye for Film praised director Declan Recks for "steadily steering the plot, keeping it tight and reasonably well-paced". Taragh Loughrey-Grant of RTÉ gave it 3/5 stars, and complimented the actors for bringing "Eugene O'Brien's excellent characters to life in a drama that is closer in style to a documentary". Jeannette Catsoulis of The New York Times raved about its "kitchen-sink drama influence".

But in a slightly negative review, Lauren Wissot of Slant Magazine chided the film as being "knock-off Mike Leigh [and/or] Ken Loach". And Ray Bennett of the Associated Press via The Hollywood Reporter commented that its "screen adaptation may be more at home on television".
