= Out of Innocence =

- Theatrical film poster
- Directed by: Danny Hiller
- Written by: Danny Hiller
- Starring: Alun Armstrong; Gary Whelan; Ruth McCabe; Fionnuala Flaherty; Fiona Shaw
- Distributed by: Central City Media (United Kingdom); Eclipse Pictures (Ireland)
- Release date: 2016
- Running time: 110 minutes
- Countries: United Kingdom; Ireland
- Language: English

Out of Innocence is a 2016 crime drama film written and directed by Danny Hiller and starring Alun Armstrong, Gary Whelan, Ruth McCabe, Fionnuala Flaherty and Fiona Shaw. It is based on the Kerry babies case.

== Cast ==
- Alun Armstrong as Detective Callaghan
- Gary Whelan as Judge Griffin
- Ruth McCabe as Patsy Kerrigan
- Fionnuala Flaherty as Sarah Flynn
- Fiona Shaw as Catherine Flynn
- Judith Roddy as Frances Flynn
- Will O'Connell as Patrick Mann
- Mark Huberman as Garda Coleman
- Nick Dunning as Michael Horgan
- Paul Curran as Tribunal Court Clerk

== Release ==
The film was released in theaters in Ireland on April 12, 2019.

== Reception ==
The film has an 86% rating on Rotten Tomatoes based on seven reviews. Sinead Brennan of RTÉ.ie awarded the film two and a half stars out of five. Tara Brady of The Irish Times awarded the film three stars out of five.
