= Snap (2010 film) =

2010 Irish film

- Theatrical film poster
- Directed by: Carmel Winters
- Written by: Carmel Winters
- Produced by: Martina Niland
- Starring: Aisling O'Sullivan; Stephen Moran; Eileen Walsh
- Cinematography: Kate McCullough
- Edited by: Mary Finlay
- Music by: Anna Jordan; Keith Lindsay
- Release dates: April 23, 2010 (Tribeca); April 8, 2011 (Ireland)
- Running time: 83 mins.
- Country: Ireland
- Language: English

Snap is a 2010 Irish mockumentary drama film, directed and written by Carmel Winters. It stars Aisling O'Sullivan, Stephen Moran, and Eileen Walsh. It premiered at the Tribeca Festival in 2010. It later was released in Ireland in 2011.

== Synopsis ==
This Irish melodrama begins with a documentary crew invading the home of Sandra, who has agreed to be interviewed despite her caustic tongue and what seems like a burning desire to antagonize the filmmakers. Sometime in the very recent past, her teenage son Stephen kidnapped a toddler and created a national panic/sensation. Both Stephen and Sandra have become public enemies, with Sandra having been all but crucified, made into the kind of media scapegoat tabloid readers love to loathe.

== Cast ==
- Aisling O'Sullivan as Sandra
- Stephen Moran as Stephen
- Eileen Walsh as Chris
- Adam Duggan as Adam
- Maureen O'Sullivan as Annette Delaney
- Pascal Scott as Grandad
- Mick Lally as Old Man

== Reception ==
Kent Turner of Film-Forward praised Stephen Moran for "giving an extraordinary performance, completely internalizing a monster of a role". Jason Bailey of DVD Talk lauded Aisling O'Sullivan for her "enthralling performance" and noted that filmmaker Carmel Winters "has a natural gift for cinema". John Anderson of Variety echoed the sentiments, commending O'Sullivan on her "enormously complex portrayal".

Eileen Leahy of Estudios Irlandeses called it "arguably the most impressive Irish feature of 2010" and likened the film to The Butcher Boy (1997). Derek McDonnell of Film Ireland applauded Eileen Walsh for her portrayal of the best friend "with a mischievous glint in her eye". And Taragh Loughrey-Grant of RTÉ complimented Winters on her "cleverly and carefully unraveling" plot lines.
