= An Klondike =

Irish television series

- Also known as: Dominion Creek
- Created by: Dathaí Keane
- Written by: Marcus Fleming
- Directed by: Dathaí Keane
- Starring: Owen McDonnell; Dara Devaney; Seán T. Ó Meallaigh; Julian Black Antelope; Ned Dennehy; Fionnuala Flaherty; Clive Geraghty; Chloe Ewart; Seamus Hughes; Bríd Ní Neachtain; Siobhan O'Kelly; Robert O'Mahoney; Michael Glenn Murphy; Megan Riordan; Ian Toner; Steve Wall; Tim Creed; Donncha Crowley; Glen Gould; Duane Howard; Timothy V. Murphy
- Country of origin: Ireland
- Original languages: Irish; English; Tlingit
- No. of series: 2
- No. of episodes: 8

Production
- Producers: Pierce Boyce; Eileen Seoighe; Bríd Seoighe
- Camera setup: Multi-Camera
- Running time: 52 minutes

Original release
- Network: TG4
- Release: 8 September 2015 – 22 February 2017

An Klondike (Irish for 'The Klondike') is an Irish Western television series created by Dathaí Keane for TG4. Internationally, the series is known as Dominion Creek. Set during the Klondike Gold Rush, it portrays the lives of three Irish brothers in the fictional town of Dominion Creek who possess their own mining claims.

An edited version of An Klondike was screened as the closing gala at the Galway Film Fleadh in August 2015. The series premiered on TG4 on September 8, 2015, and concluded on February 22, 2017, after two seasons.

== Premise ==
In the late 19th century, three Irish emigrant brothers travel from Montana to the Yukon, Canada during the Klondike Gold Rush and settle in the town of Dominion Creek. Each has a different desire; middle brother Séamus heads out first with the hope of striking it rich, eldest Tom looks to control the family's mining claim, and youngest Pádraig chooses to instead work at the town's only hospital. They meet new allies and love interests, but also come into conflict with Dominion Creek's dangerous individuals.

== Cast ==
=== Main ===
- Owen McDonnell as Tom Connolly, the temperamental and protective oldest of the Connolly brothers
- Dara Devaney as Séamus Connolly, the reckless middle Connolly brother
- Seán T. Ó Meallaigh as Pádraig Connolly, the compassionate youngest of the Connolly brothers
- Julian Black Antelope as Skookum Jim (season 1), a Hän hunter and trapper who becomes an ally to the Connollys
- Robert O'Mahoney as Jacob Hopkins, a powerful businessman and colonel in the American Civil War who intends to control Dominion Creek
- Ned Dennehy as Captain Pat Galvin, Jacob's enforcer and fellow Civil War veteran
- Clive Geraghty as Father Judge (season 1), a humanitarian who runs Dominion Creek's only hospital
- Bríd Ní Neachtain as Belinda Mulrooney, a formidable, but compassionate entrepreneur
- Siobhan O'Kelly as Kate Mulryan, a saloon singer betrothed to Sam, but pursued by Séamus
- Steve Wall as Sam Steele, the superintendent of the Yukon's North-West Mounted Police detachment
- Ian Toner as JJ Hopkins (season 1), a saloon owner, Jacob's son, and Estella's husband
- Megan Riordan as Estella Hopkins, JJ's wife and later owner of his saloon
- Michael Glenn Murphy as Soapy Smith, an English conman operating in Dominion Creek
- Seamus Hughes as Petey McDonagh (season 1), an Irish emigrant working for the Hopkins
- Chloe Ewart as El Soo, the sister of Skookum Jim and Chief Isaac and Tom's love interest
- Fionnuala Flaherty as Bridget Mannion, Estella's maid who becomes romantically involved with Pádraig
- Glen Gould as Chief Isaac (season 2; recurring season 1), a Hän chief and brother of Skookum Jim and El Soo
- Tim Creed as Micí Bán Connolly (season 2), a cousin of the Connolly brothers
- Timothy V. Murphy as Peachy Taylor (season 2), a dangerous ally of Pat
- Duane Howard as Mr. Angel (season 2), Peachy's Miꞌkmaq partner
- Donncha Crowley as Al Carbonneau (season 2), Soapy's friend and fellow conman pretending to be a French count

=== Recurring ===
- Barry Barnes as Michael Dillon (season 1), a friend of the Connollys
- Mimi Carroll as Maude, a prostitute who partakes in mining a claim with Pádraig and Bridget
- Gary Murphy as Dr. Dunn, Dominion Creek's doctor
- Mary Lou McCarthy as Una, a young Irish prostitute

== Production ==
Created and directed by Dathaí Keane, the show was filmed on location in Connemara, Ireland, with the County Galway scenery standing in for the Yukon. The fictional town of Dominion Creek was built near Oughterard, while the mining scenes were shot at Glengowla Mines, a 19th-century silver and lead mine. An Klondike was produced by the Galway-based company Abú Media Teo. Pierce Boyce, Eileen Seoighe and Bríd Seoighe served as producers of the series.

A second series of four episodes was filmed in the summer of 2016 and aired in early 2017.

== Reception ==
An Klondike has received mostly positive reviews, The Irish Times noting "I'm not sure there's TV gold in An Klondike, but you can't fault its ambition and style", also noting its similarities to Deadwood and Even Dwarfs Started Small.

In 2016, the first season of An Klondike received nine Irish Film and Television Award nominations, winning four awards: one each for Best Drama, Actor, Make-Up and Script.

In 2017, the second season of An Klondike received ten IFTA nominations, winning two awards: one for Best Director Drama and one for Supporting Actor.

== See also ==
- List of programmes broadcast by TG4
