= Zara Devlin =

Northern Irish actress

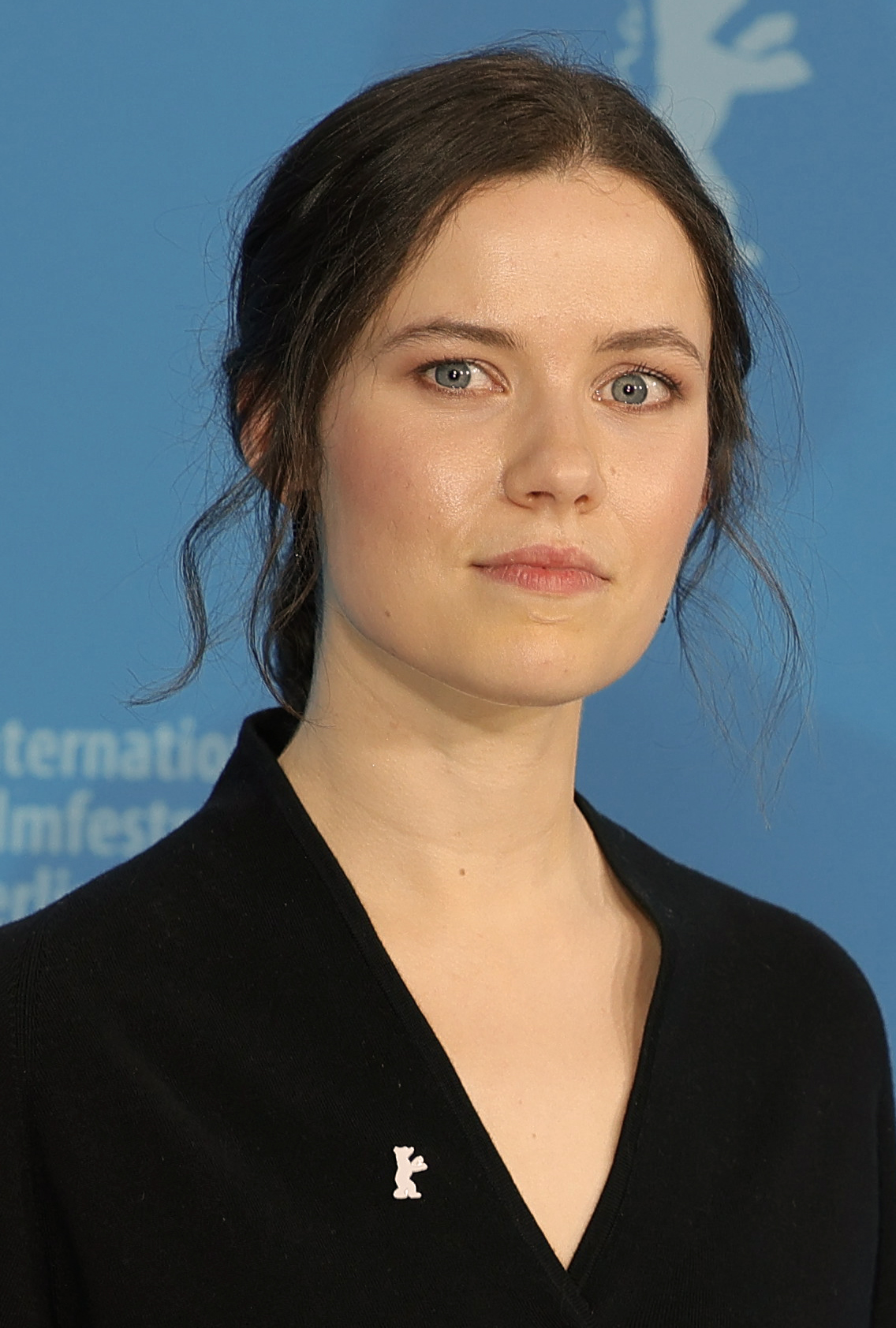
- Devlin at the 2024 Berlinale
- Born: 1995 or 1996 (age 30–31); County Tyrone, Northern Ireland
- Education: The Lir Academy
- Occupation: Actress
- Years active: 2018–present

Zara Devlin (born 1995 or 1996) is an actress from Northern Ireland. For her performance as Ann Lovett in the film Ann (2022), she was nominated for the Irish Film and Television Award for Best Actress in a Leading Role in a Film. She was also nominated for the Irish Film and Television Award for Best Supporting Actress for her role in Small Things Like These (2024).

== Early life ==
Devlin was born to father Michael and mother Michelle and grew up in Kildress, a suburb of Cookstown, County Tyrone. She has a brother, Shane, and a sister, Emily. Devlin studied at The Lir Academy, graduating in 2018 with a Bachelor of Arts (BA) in Acting.

== Filmography ==
=== Film ===
Year	Title	Role	Notes	Ref
2018	Ghost Gaff	Daughter #1	Short film	
2019	A Bump Along the Way	Rhiannon Coyle		
2019	The Other Lamb	Tabitha		
2022	Ann	Ann Lovett		
2023	The Nightman	Alex		
2024	Small Things Like These	Sarah		

=== Television ===
Year	Title	Role	Notes
2021	Modern Love	Shannon	1 episode
