= Fiona Shaw =

Irish actress (born 1958)

Fiona Shaw CBE
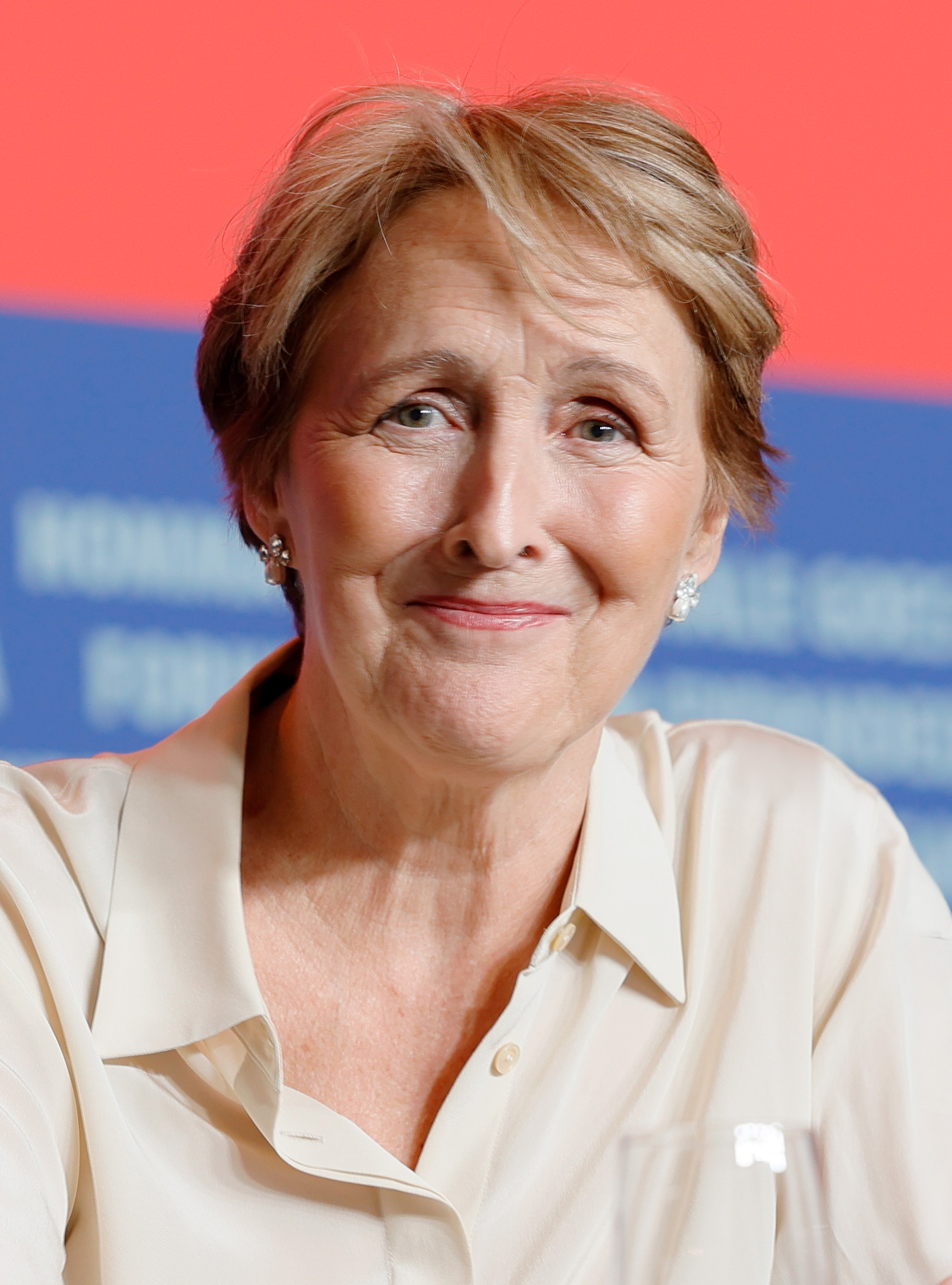
- Shaw in 2025
- Born: Fiona Mary Wilson; 10 July 1958 (age 68); Farranree, County Cork, Ireland
- Occupation: Actress
- Years active: 1983–present
- Spouse: Sonali Deraniyagala (m. 2018)

Fiona Shaw (born Fiona Mary Wilson; 10 July 1958) is an Irish actress in screen and stage. She did extensive work with the Royal Shakespeare Company and the National Theatre, as well as in film and television. In 2020, she was listed at No. 29 on The Irish Times list of Ireland's greatest film actors. She was made an Honorary Commander of the Order of the British Empire (CBE) by Queen Elizabeth II in 2001.

She won both the 1990 and 1994 Laurence Olivier Award for Best Actress for roles in the plays Electra, As You Like It, The Good Person of Szechwan (1990), and Machinal (1994) and received a further three Olivier Award nominations for her roles in Mephisto (1986), Hedda Gabler (1992), and Happy Days (2008). She made her Broadway debut playing the title role in Medea (2002) for which she earned a nomination for the Tony Award for Best Actress in a Play. She returned to Broadway in the Colm Tóibín play The Testament of Mary (2013).

In film, she played Petunia Dursley in the Harry Potter film series (2001–2010). She also acted in My Left Foot (1989), Persuasion (1995), Jane Eyre (1996), The Tree of Life (2011), Colette (2018), Ammonite (2020), Enola Holmes (2020), and Sense and Sensibility (2026).

Her television roles include Hedda Hopper in the HBO film RKO 281 (1999), and Marnie Stonebrook in the HBO series True Blood (2011). She played Carolyn Martens in the BBC series Killing Eve (2018–22), for which she received the 2019 BAFTA TV Award for Best Supporting Actress, as well as two Primetime Emmy Award nominations. For her role as a counselor in Fleabag (2019), she received a Primetime Emmy Award for Outstanding Guest Actress in a Comedy Series nomination. She starred in the BBC One series Baptiste (2021), and the Disney+ series Andor (2022).

== Early life ==
Shaw was born Fiona Mary Wilson on 10 July 1958 in Farranree, County Cork, Ireland, the daughter of physicist Mary T. Wilson (née Flynn, born 1927) and ophthalmic surgeon Denis Joseph Wilson (1922–2011), who wed in 1952. They maintained a home in Montenotte. Her father was of half English descent. The second of four children, she has an older brother, John, and two younger brothers, Mark and Peter, the latter of whom was killed in a car accident aged 18. She attended secondary school at Scoil Mhuire in Cork, and received her degree in philosophy at University College Cork. Shaw studied at the Royal Academy of Dramatic Art (RADA) in London, graduating in 1982 with an Acting (RADA Diploma). On joining Equity, she had to change her name because they already had a member named Fiona Wilson. She adopted the surname Shaw, which was her grandmother's maiden name, also doing so in tribute to George Bernard Shaw.

== Career ==
=== Theatre ===
In 1983, she starred as Julia in the National Theatre production of Richard Brinsley Sheridan's The Rivals (1983). Her theatrical roles include Celia in As You Like It (1984), Madame de Volanges in Les Liaisons Dangereuses (1985), Katherine in The Taming of the Shrew (1987), Lady Franjul in The New Inn (1987), Young Woman in Machinal (1993), for which she won the Laurence Olivier Award for Best Actress.

Shaw notably played the male lead in Richard II, directed by Deborah Warner in 1995. She performed T. S. Eliot's poem The Waste Land as a one-person show at the Liberty Theatre in New York to great acclaim in 1996, winning the Drama Desk Award for Outstanding One-Person Show for her performance.

Winnie in Happy Days (2007), and the title roles in Electra (1988), The Good Person of Sechuan (1989), Hedda Gabler (1991), The Prime of Miss Jean Brodie (1998) and Medea (2000).

In 2009, Shaw collaborated with Deborah Warner again, taking the lead role in Tony Kushner's translation of Bertolt Brecht's Mother Courage and Her Children. In a 2002 article for The Daily Telegraph, Rupert Christiansen described their professional relationship as "surely one of the most richly creative partnerships in theatrical history." Other collaborations between the two women include productions of Brecht's The Good Woman of Szechuan and Ibsen's Hedda Gabler, the latter was adapted for television.

In 2010, Shaw appeared in The Waste Land at Wilton's Music Hall, and in a National Theatre revival of London Assurance. In November 2010, Shaw starred in Ibsen's John Gabriel Borkman at the Abbey Theatre, Dublin alongside Alan Rickman and Lindsay Duncan. The play was also staged in New York's Brooklyn Academy of Music in 2011. In 2012, Shaw appeared in the National Theatre revival of Scenes from an Execution by Howard Barker. The world's largest solo theatre festival, United Solo, recognised her performance in The Testament of Mary on Broadway with the 2013 United Solo Special Award.

=== Television and film ===
In 1984, Shaw played Miss Morrison in The Adventures of Sherlock Holmes episode The Adventure of the Crooked Man. She appeared in My Left Foot (1989), Mountains of the Moon (1990), Three Men and a Little Lady (1990), Super Mario Bros. (1993), Undercover Blues (1993), Persuasion (1995), Jane Eyre (1996), The Butcher Boy (1997), The Avengers (1998), Gormenghast (2000), and five of the Harry Potter films in which she played Petunia Dursley, Harry Potter's repressed maternal aunt. Shaw had a brief but key role in Brian DePalma's The Black Dahlia (2006).

Shaw appeared in season four of the American TV show True Blood. Shaw's character, Marnie Stonebrook, has been described as an underachieving palm reader who is spiritually possessed by an actual witch.

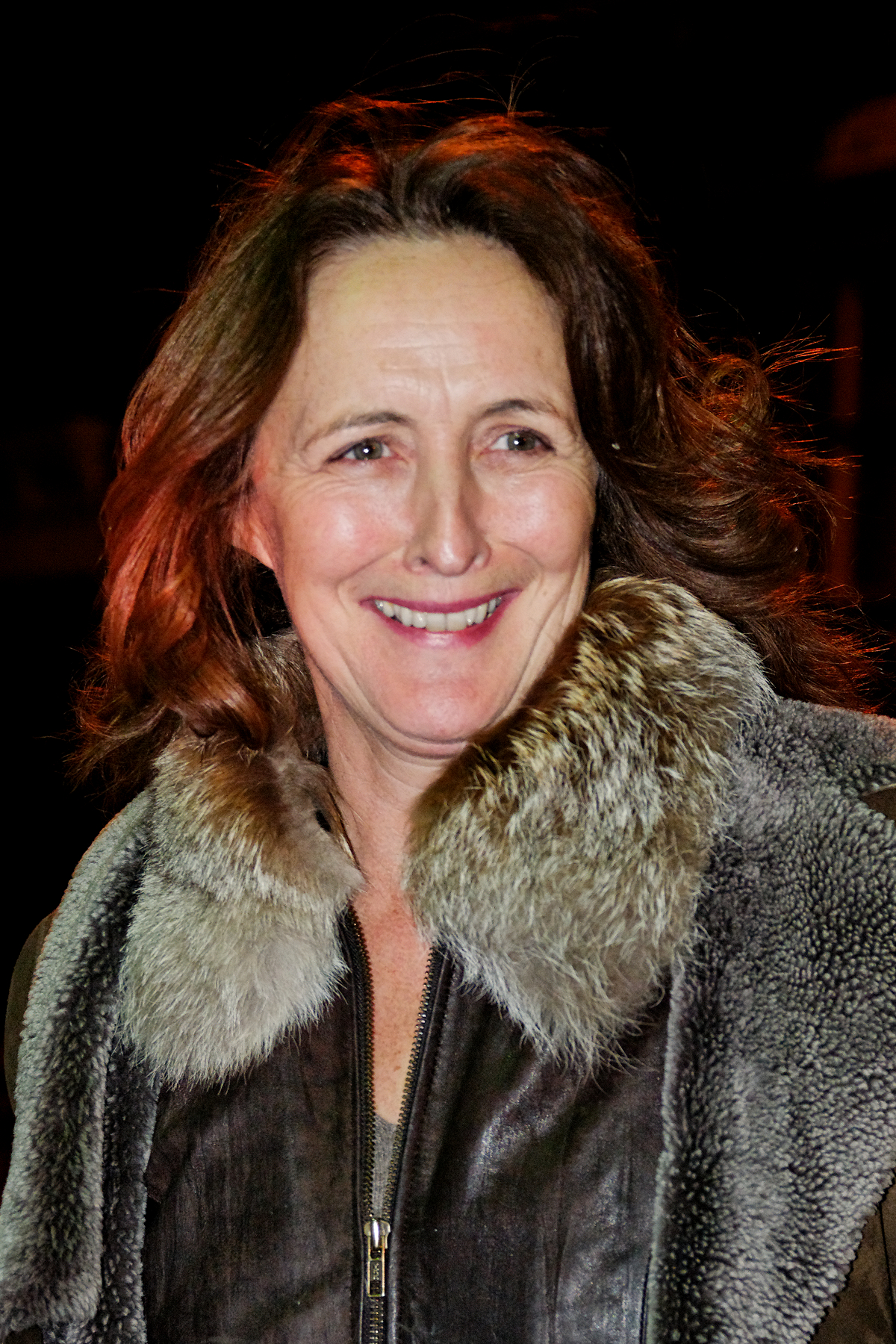
Fiona Shaw in 2013

In 2013, she starred as Catherine Greenshaw in Agatha Christie's Marple episode "Greenshaw's Folly".

In 2018, Shaw began portraying Carolyn Martens, the head of MI6's Russia-focused branch, in BBC America's Killing Eve. For her performance, she won the BAFTA Award for Best Actress in a Supporting Role in a Television Series. Later the same year, she played a senior MI6 officer in Mrs Wilson. For her role as a counselor in Phoebe Waller-Bridge series Fleabag (2019) she received a Primetime Emmy Award for Outstanding Guest Actress in a Comedy Series nomination.

In 2020, she was listed at No. 29 on The Irish Times list of Ireland's greatest film actors.

Shaw starred in the Star Wars television series Andor as the titular character's adoptive mother, Maarva Andor. For her work in Andor, Shaw was nominated for a BAFTA Award for Best Supporting Actress.

In October 2022, Shaw was awarded an AudioFile Magazine Earphone Award for her performance of The Bullet That Missed, the third book in Richard Osman's The Thursday Murder Club series.

In 2024, she portrayed Rose Aguineau, a woman with a mysterious past who aids the protagonists, in season 4 of True Detective. Later in the same year, she also appeared as Angelica Muldoon in season 2 of Bad Sisters.

== Personal life ==
Shaw is gay, although she had been in two relationships with men before realising her sexual orientation, stating "it was a shock. I was full of self-hatred and thought I would come back into the fold shortly. But I just didn't."

From 2002 to 2005, Shaw was the partner of English actress Saffron Burrows. She met Sri Lankan economist Sonali Deraniyagala after reading Deraniyagala's memoir, and they married in 2018. Shaw lives in Islington, North London, having previously lived in nearby Primrose Hill, "within earshot of London Zoo".

Shaw was raised Catholic, and in January 1997, she spent two weeks with the Tyburn Nuns at their convent.

== Acting credits ==
Key
†	Denotes films that have not yet been released

=== Film ===
Year	Title	Role(s)	Note
1984	The Man Who Shot Christmas	Laura	Short film
1985	Sacred Hearts	Sister Felicity	
1989	My Left Foot	Dr. Eileen Cole	
1990	Mountains of the Moon	Isabel	
1990	Three Men and a Little Lady	Miss Elspeth Lomax	
1991	London Kills Me	Headley	
1992	The Big Fish	Unknown role	Short film
1992	Ridin' High: The Video	Dancer	Direct-to-video film
1993	Super Mario Bros.	Lena	
1993	Undercover Blues	Novacek	
1995	Persuasion	Mrs Croft	
1995	The Waste Land	Unknown role	Short film
1996	Jane Eyre	Mrs Reede	
1997	Anna Karenina	Lydia	
1997	The Butcher Boy	Mrs Nugent	
1998	The Avengers	Father	
1999	The Last September	Marda Norton	
2001	Triumph of Love	Leontine	
2001	Harry Potter and the Philosopher's Stone	Petunia Dursley	
2002	Close Your Eyes	Catherine Lebourg	
2002	Harry Potter and the Chamber of Secrets	Petunia Dursley	
2004	Harry Potter and the Prisoner of Azkaban	Petunia Dursley	
2005	Midsummer Dream	The Witches (voices)	English version only
2006	The Black Dahlia	Ramona Linscott	
2006	Catch and Release	Mrs Douglas	
2007	Fracture	Judge Robinson	
2007	Harry Potter and the Order of the Phoenix	Petunia Dursley	
2009	Dorian Gray	Agatha	
2010	National Theatre Live: London Assurance	Lady Gay Spanker	
2010	We Believed	Emilie Ashurst	
2010	Harry Potter and the Deathly Hallows: Part 1	Petunia Dursley	
2010	Tell Me	Martha	Short film
2011	The Tree of Life	Grandmother	
2013	The English Teacher	Narrator	
2013	The Daisy Chain	Narrator	Short film
2015	Pixels	Prime Minister	Uncredited
2016	The White King	Kathrin Fitz	
2016	Out of Innocence	Catherine Flynn	
2017	The Hippopotamus	Anne Logan	
2018	Lizzie	Abby Borden	
2018	Colette	Sido	
2020	Ammonite	Elizabeth Philpot	
2020	Enola Holmes	Miss Harrison	
2020	Kindred	Margaret	
2024	IF	Bea's grandmother	
2024	That Christmas	Ms. Trapper (voice)	
2025	Hot Milk	Rose	
2025	Echo Valley	Jessie Oliver	
2026	The Education of Jane Cumming	Lady Cumming Gordon	
2026	Ladies First	Felicity Shaw	
2026	Sense and Sensibility	Mrs Jennings	
TBA	The Stalemate †	TBA	Post-production

=== Television ===
Year	Title	Role	Notes	Ref.
1983	All for Love	Elspeth	Episode: "Fireworks for Elspeth"	
1984	The Adventures of Sherlock Holmes	Miss Morrison	Episode: "The Crooked Man"	
1985	Love Song	Young Deirdre	TV movie	
1990	Theatre Night	Clytemnestra	Episode: "Iphigenia at Aulis"	
1991	For the Greater Good	Gillian Savage	2 episodes	
1992	Shakespeare: The Animated Tales	Viola	Voice; Episode: "Twelfth Night"	
1992, 1995	Screen Two	Pauline	Episode: "Maria's Child"	
1992, 1995	Screen Two	Mrs Croft	Episode: "Persuasion"	
1993, 1997	Performance	Hedda Gabler	Episode: "Hedda Gabler"	
1993, 1997	Performance	Richard II	Episode: "Richard II"	
1994	Seascape	Unknown role	TV movie	
1999	RKO 281	Hedda Hopper	TV movie	
2000	Gormenghast	Irma Prunesquallor	Miniseries (4 episodes)	
2001	Mind Games	Frances O'Neil	TV movie	
2001	The Seventh Stream	Mrs Gourdon	TV movie	
2005	Empire	Fulvia	Miniseries (3 episodes)	
2005–06	Ebb and Flo	Narrator and all characters (including Flo)		
2007	Trial & Retribution	Jo Wilson QC	Episode: "Mirror Image: Part 2"	
2009	Dido and Aeneas – Didon et Énée	Comédienne dans le prologue	TV movie	
2011	True Blood	Marnie Stonebrook	Recurring role (12 episodes)	
2013	Marple	Miss Katherine Greenshaw	Episode: "Greenshaw's Folly"	
2014	Masterpiece Mystery	Miss Katherine Greenshaw	Episode: "Agatha Christie's Miss Marple VII: Greenshaw's Folly"	
2015	Lumen	D'Laria	TV movie	
2015–17	Sarah & Duck	Music Lady	2 episodes	
2016	Maigret Sets a Trap	Madam Moncin	TV movie	
2016	Channel Zero	Marla Painter	Series regular (6 episodes)	
2017	Emerald City	Mombi	2 episodes	
2017	Inside No. 9	Jean	Episode: "Private View"	
2017	Penn Zero: Part-Time Hero	Hedwin	Voice; Episode: "Mr Rippen"	
2018	Mrs Wilson	Coleman	Miniseries (3 episodes)	
2018	3Below: Tales of Arcadia	Birdie / Halcon	Voice; Episode: "Flying the Coop"	
2018–22	Killing Eve	Carolyn Martens	Series regular (31 episodes)	
2019	Fleabag	Counsellor	Episode: "#2.2"	
2021	Baptiste	Emma Chambers	Series regular (6 episodes)	
2022	Andor	Maarva Andor	Series regular (5 episodes)	
2024	True Detective: Night Country	Rose Aguineau	Main role	
2024	Bad Sisters	Angelica Collins	Main role	
2025	The Simpsons	Mrs McCormick	Voice, episode: "The Flandshees of Innersimpson"	
2026	Pride and Prejudice †	Lady Catherine de Bourgh	Upcoming series	
TBA	Presumed Innocent †	TBA	Upcoming series	
TBA	Anansi Boys †	Maeve Livingstone	Upcoming series	

=== Theatre ===
Year	Title	Role(s)	Venue	Ref.
1982	Woyzeck	Margret/Showman	Epworth Hall, Edinburgh	
1983	The Rivals	Julia Melville	Royal National Theatre, London	
1985	As You Like It	Celia	Royal Shakespeare Theatre, Stratford-upon-Avon	
1985	Philistines	Tatyana Vasilyevna	The Other Place, Stratford-upon-Avon	
1985	Les Liaisons Dangereuses	Mme de Volanges	The Other Place, Stratford-upon-Avon	
1985	Barnes' People	Performer	The Other Place, Stratford-upon-Avon	
1985	Gone to Heaven (Back Soon)	Performer	The Other Place, Stratford-upon-Avon	
1985	As You Like It	Celia	Barbican Theatre, London	
1986	Philistines	Tatyana Vasilyevna	The Pit, London	
1986	Les Liaisons Dangereuses	Mme de Volanges	The Pit, London	
1986	Mephisto	Erika Bruckner	Barbican Theatre, London	
1986	Missa Super L'Homme Arme	Performer	Almeida Theatre, London	
1986	Blood on the Neck of the Cat	Performer	Almeida Theatre, London	
1986	The Merchant of Venice	Portia	UK tour	
1986	Much Ado About Nothing	Beatrice	UK tour	
1987	Hyde Park	Mistress Carol	Swan Theatre, Stratford-upon-Avon	
1987	The Taming of the Shrew	Katherina	Royal Shakespeare Theatre, Stratford-upon-Avon	
1987	The New Inn	Lady Frampul	Swan Theatre, Stratford-upon-Avon	
1988	The New Inn	Lady Frampul	The People's Theatre, Newcastle-upon-Tyne	
1988	The Taming of the Shrew	Katherina	Theatre Royal, Newcastle-upon-Tyne	
1988	The Taming of the Shrew	Katherina	Barbican Theatre, London	
1988	Hyde Park	Mistress Carol	The Pit, London	
1988	Electra	Electra	The Pit, London	
1989	As You Like It	Rosalind	The Old Vic, London	
1989	The Good Person of Sichuan	Shen Te	Royal National Theatre, London	
1991	Hedda Gabler	Hedda Gabler	Abbey Theatre, Dublin	
1991	Hedda Gabler	Hedda Gabler	MI Group Playhouse, West End	
1991	Electra	Electra	Riverside Studios, London	
1992	Electra	Electra	Bobigny Theatre, Paris	
1992	Electra	Electra	Templemore Sports Complex, Derry	
1993	Machinal	Young Woman	Royal National Theatre, London	
1994	Footfalls	May	Garrick Theatre, London	
1994	Shakespeare's Language	Performer	The Pit, London	
1995	Richard II	Richard II	Royal National Theatre, London	
1995	The Way of the World	Mistress Millamant	Royal National Theatre, London	
1996	The Waste Land	Performer	Liberty Theatre, Off-Broadway	
1998	The Prime of Miss Jean Brodie	Jean Brodie	Royal National Theatre, London	
2000	Medea	Medea	Abbey Theatre, Dublin	
2001	Medea	Medea	Queen's Theatre, West End	
2002	The Powerbook	Performer	Royal National Theatre, London	
2002	Medea	Medea	Brooks Atkinson Theatre, Broadway	
2003	The Seagull	Arkadina	King's Theatre, Edinburgh	
2005	Julius Caesar	Portia	Barbican Theatre, London	
2006	Woman and Scarecrow	Woman	Royal Court Theatre, London	
2007	Happy Days	Winnie	Royal National Theatre, London	
2008	Happy Days	Winnie	Abbey Theatre, Dublin	
2008	Happy Days	Winnie	Brooklyn Academy of Music	
2009	Mother Courage and Her Children	Mother Courage	Royal National Theatre, London	
2010	London Assurance	Lady Gay Spanker	Royal National Theatre, London	
2010	John Gabriel Borkman	Gunhild	Abbey Theatre, Dublin	
2011	John Gabriel Borkman	Gunhild	Brooklyn Academy of Music	
2012	Scenes from an Execution	Galactia	Royal National Theatre, London	
2013	The Testament of Mary	Performer	Walter Kerr Theatre, Broadway	
2013	The Rime of the Ancient Mariner	Performer	Brooklyn Academy of Music	
2022	The Tempest	Ariel (voice)	Ustinov Studio, Bath	

=== Other projects ===
- When Love Speaks (2002, EMI Classics): "It is thy will thy image should keep open"
- Simon Schama's John Donne: 2009

== Awards and nominations ==
Organizations	Year	Category	Work	Result	Ref.
BAFTA TV Awards	2019	Best Supporting Actress	Killing Eve	Won	
BAFTA TV Awards	2023	Best Supporting Actress	Andor	Nominated	
Critics' Choice Super Awards	2023	Best Actress in a Science Fiction/Fantasy Series	Andor	Nominated	
Drama Desk Awards	1997	Outstanding Solo Performance	The Waste Land	Won	
Drama Desk Awards	2003	Outstanding Actress in a Play	Medea	Nominated	
Drama Desk Awards	2008	Outstanding Actress in a Play	Happy Days	Nominated	
Evening Standard Theatre Awards	1993	Best Actress	Machinal	Won	
Evening Standard Theatre Awards	2001	Best Actress	Medea	Won	
Kerry International Film Festival	2025	The Maureen O'Hara Award	Herself	Honored	
Laurence Olivier Awards	1986	Best Performance in a Supporting Role	As You Like It / Mephisto	Nominated	
Laurence Olivier Awards	1990	Best Actress	Electra / As You Like It / The Good Person of Szechwan	Won	
Laurence Olivier Awards	1992	Best Actress	Hedda Gabler	Nominated	
Laurence Olivier Awards	1994	Best Actress	Machinal	Won	
Laurence Olivier Awards	2008	Best Actress	Happy Days	Nominated	
Peabody Awards	2022	Peabody Award	Andor	Won	
Primetime Emmy Awards	2019	Outstanding Supporting Actress in a Drama Series	Killing Eve (episode: "Nice and Neat")	Nominated	
Primetime Emmy Awards	2019	Outstanding Guest Actress in a Comedy Series	Fleabag (episode: Episode 2")	Nominated	
Primetime Emmy Awards	2020	Outstanding Supporting Actress in a Drama Series	Killing Eve (episode: "Management Sucks")	Nominated	
Tony Awards	2003	Best Actress in a Play	Medea	Nominated	
