= 18th Irish Film & Television Awards =

Media event, March 2022

- Date: 12 March 2022
- Site: Virtual ceremony
- Hosted by: Deirdre O'Kane

Highlights
- Best Film: An Cailín Ciúin
- Best Direction: Colm Bairéad; An Cailín Ciúin
- Best Actor: Moe Dunford; Nightride
- Best Actress: Catherine Clinch; An Cailín Ciúin
- Most awards: An Cailín Ciúin (7)
- Most nominations: KIN (13)

Television coverage
- Channel: Virgin Media One

The 18th Irish Film & Television Academy Awards, also called the IFTA Film & Drama Awards 2022, took place in March 2022. The ceremony honours Irish films and television drama released between 1 January 2021 and 11 March 2022. Nominations were announced on 22 February 2022. The ceremony aired on Virgin Media One on 12 March 2022, hosted by Deirdre O'Kane. Rising Star nominees were announced on 4 March 2022, ahead of the ceremony.

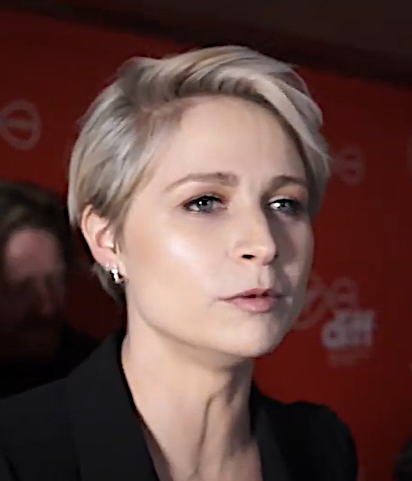
Niamh Algar was nominated for two acting awards, for Deceit and Censor.

== Film ==
=== Best film ===
- An Cailín Ciúin (winner)
- Belfast
- Deadly Cuts
- Swan Song
- Who We Love
- You Are Not My Mother

=== Director ===
- Colm Bairéad – An Cailín Ciúin (winner)
- Kenneth Branagh – Belfast
- Graham Cantwell – Who We Love
- Benjamin Cleary – Swan Song
- Kate Dolan – You Are Not My Mother
- Paddy Slattery – Broken Law

=== Script ===
- Kenneth Branagh – Belfast (winner)
- Graham Cantwell and Katie McNeice – Who We Love
- Benjamin Cleary – Swan Song
- Philip Doherty – Redemption of a Rogue
- Kate Dolan – You Are Not My Mother

=== Actress in a leading role ===
- Niamh Algar – Censor
- Angeline Ball – Deadly Cuts
- Catherine Clinch – An Cailín Ciúin (winner)
- Gemma-Leah Devereux – The Bright Side
- Hazel Doupe – You Are Not My Mother

=== Actor in a leading role ===
- Peter Coonan – Doineann
- Moe Dunford – Nightride (winner)
- Jude Hill – Belfast
- Aaron Monaghan – Redemption of a Rogue
- Dónall Ó Héalai – Foscadh

=== Actress in a supporting role ===
- Caitríona Balfe – Belfast
- Jessie Buckley – The Lost Daughter (winner)
- Carrie Crowley – An Cailín Ciúin
- Amy-Joyce Hastings – Who We Love
- Ruth Negga – Passing

=== Actor in a supporting role ===
- Jamie Dornan – Belfast
- Ciarán Hinds – Belfast (winner)
- Cillian Ó Gairbhí – Foscadh
- Dean Quinn – Who We Love
- Tom Vaughan-Lawlor – The Bright Side

=== George Morrison Feature Documentary ===
- Castro's Spies
- Love Yourself Today
- Lyra
- Pure Grit
- The Dance
- Young Plato (winner)

=== Short film – Live action ===
- A White Horse
- Best Foot Forward
- Debutante
- Harvest
- Nothing to Declare (winner)
- Scrap
- Ship of Souls
- Silence
- The Colour Between
- The Passion

=== Animated short ===
- Bardo
- Da Humbug
- Fall of the Ibis King (winner)
- Memento Mori

== Television drama ==
=== Drama ===
- Hidden Assets (RTÉ One / BBC Four)
- KIN (RTÉ One) (winner)
- Smother, series 2 (RTÉ One)
- Vikings: Valhalla (Netflix)

=== Director ===
- Ciaran Donnelly – The Wheel of Time
- Dathaí Keane – Smother
- Diarmuid Goggins – KIN
- Hannah Quinn – Vikings: Valhalla (winner)
- Lisa Mulcahy – Ridley Road

=== Script ===
- Declan Croghan – Vikings: Valhalla
- Kate O'Riordan – Smother
- Morna Regan – Hidden Assets
- John Morton – Hidden Assets
- Peter McKenna – Hidden Assets
- Peter McKenna – KIN (winner)

=== Actress in a leading role ===
- Angeline Ball – Hidden Assets
- Clare Dunne – KIN (winner)
- Dervla Kirwan – Smother
- Niamh Algar – Deceit
- Sinéad Keenan – Three Families

=== Actor in a leading role ===
- Aidan Gillen – KIN
- James Nesbitt – Stay Close
- Liam Cunningham – Domina
- Sam Keeley – KIN (winner)

=== Actress in a supporting role ===
- Cathy Belton – Hidden Assets
- Justine Mitchell – Smother
- Lola Petticrew – Three Families
- Maria Doyle Kennedy – KIN (winner)
- Simone Kirby – Hidden Assets

=== Actor in a supporting role ===
- Andrew Scott – The Pursuit of Love
- Ciarán Hinds – KIN (winner)
- Emmett J. Scanlan – KIN
- Owen McDonnell – Three Families
- Peter Coonan – Hidden Assets

== Craft ==
=== Original Music ===
- David Holmes – KIN
- Die Hexen – You Are Not My Mother
- Joseph Conlan – Who We Love
- Stephen Rennicks – An Cailín Ciúin (winner)
- Van Morrison – Belfast

=== Editing ===
- Dermot Diskin – KIN
- John Murphy – An Cailín Ciúin (winner)
- Nathan Nugent – Swan Song
- Tony Cranstoun – Zone 414
- Úna Ní Dhonghaíle – Belfast

=== Production Design ===
- Derek Wallace – KIN
- Emma Lowney – An Cailín Ciúin (winner)
- Joe Fallover – Wolf
- Tom Conroy – Vikings: Valhalla
- Tamara Conboy – Deadly Cuts

=== Cinematography ===
- Burschi Wojnar – Redemption of a Rogue
- Kate McCullough – An Cailín Ciúin (winner)
- James Mather – KIN
- Narayan Van Maele – You Are Not My Mother
- Peter Robertson – Vikings: Valhalla

=== Costume Design ===
- Eimer Ní Mhaoldomhnaigh – Foundation
- Kathy Strachan – Deadly Cuts (winner)
- Louise Stanton – An Cailín Ciúin
- Susan O'Connor Cave – Vikings: Valhalla
- Susan Scott – Zone 414

=== Makeup & Hair ===
- Sian Wilson – Belfast
- Lyndsey Herron & Edwina Kelly – Deadly Cuts
- Linda Gannon & Clare Lambe – Foundation
- Eileen Buggy, Audrey Doyle, Barrie Gower – The Green Knight (winner)
- Dee Corcoran, Joe Whelan, Thomas McInerney – Vikings: Valhalla

=== Sound ===
- Aza Hand & Alan Scully – Boys from County Hell
- John "Bob" Brennan, Fionán Higgins, Mark Henry, & Andrew Kirwan – Smother
- Karl Merren & Johnny Marshell – The Green Knight
- Steve Fanagan – Swan Song (winner)
- Steve Fanagan, John "Bob" Brennan, Brendan Rehill – An Cailín Ciúin

=== VFX ===
- Ed Bruce & Andrew Barry – Spider-Man: No Way Home
- Ed Bruce & Andrew Barry – The Nevers
- Ed Bruce & Manuel Martinez – Swan Song
- Ed Bruce & Sam Johnston – The Book of Boba Fett
- Kevin Cahill & Eric Saindon – The Green Knight (winner)

== Special ==
=== Rising Star ===
- Colm Bairéad (Director/Writer — An Cailín Ciúin)
  - Benjamin Cleary (Director/Writer — Swan Song)
  - Kate Dolan (Director/Writer — You Are Not My Mother)
  - Hazel Doupe (Actor — You Are Not My Mother)
  - Sam Keeley (Actor — Kin)

== See also ==
- 2021 in Irish television
- 2022 in Irish television
- 75th British Academy Film Awards
- 2022 British Academy Television Awards
