= London Film Critics Circle Awards 2022 =

Edition of British film awards

43rd London Film Critics' Circle Awards

5 February 2023

Film of the Year:
Tár

British/Irish Film of the Year:
The Banshees of Inisherin

The 43rd London Film Critics' Circle Awards honoured the best in film of 2022, as chosen by the London Film Critics' Circle. All films released in a UK cinema or to premiere via streaming service between February 2022 and February 2023 were all eligible to be nominated. The ceremony was held on 5 February 2023 at The May Fair Hotel in London. The nominations were announced on 21 December 2022 by actors Ellie Bamber and Fionn O'Shea, while British comedian and actor Anna Leong Brophy hosted the ceremony. The Banshees of Inisherin received the most nominations with nine, followed by Aftersun with eight.

Actress, producer, and UNDP Goodwill Ambassador Michelle Yeoh received the Dilys Powell Award for Excellence in Film.

== Winners and nominees ==
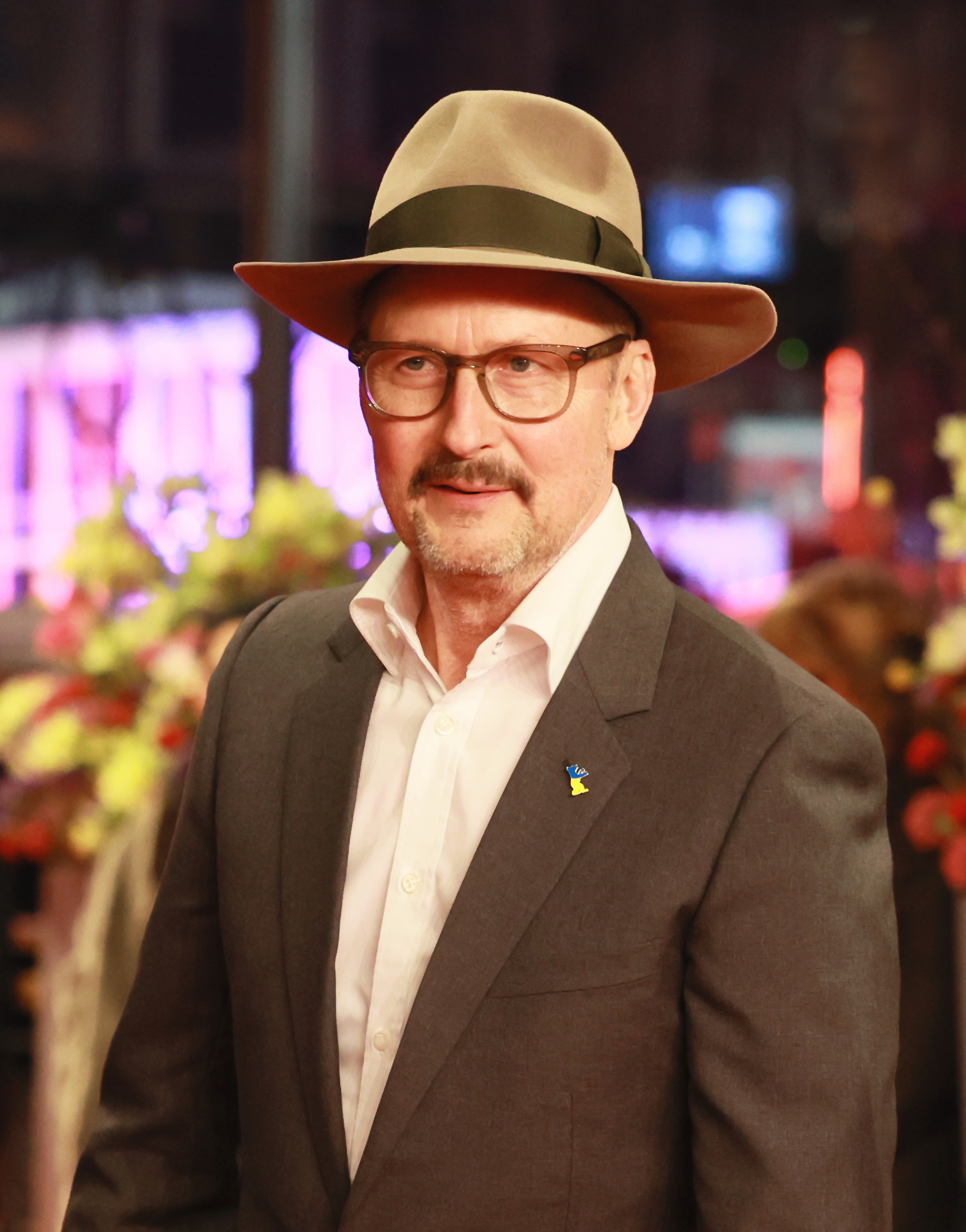
Todd Field, Director of the Year winner

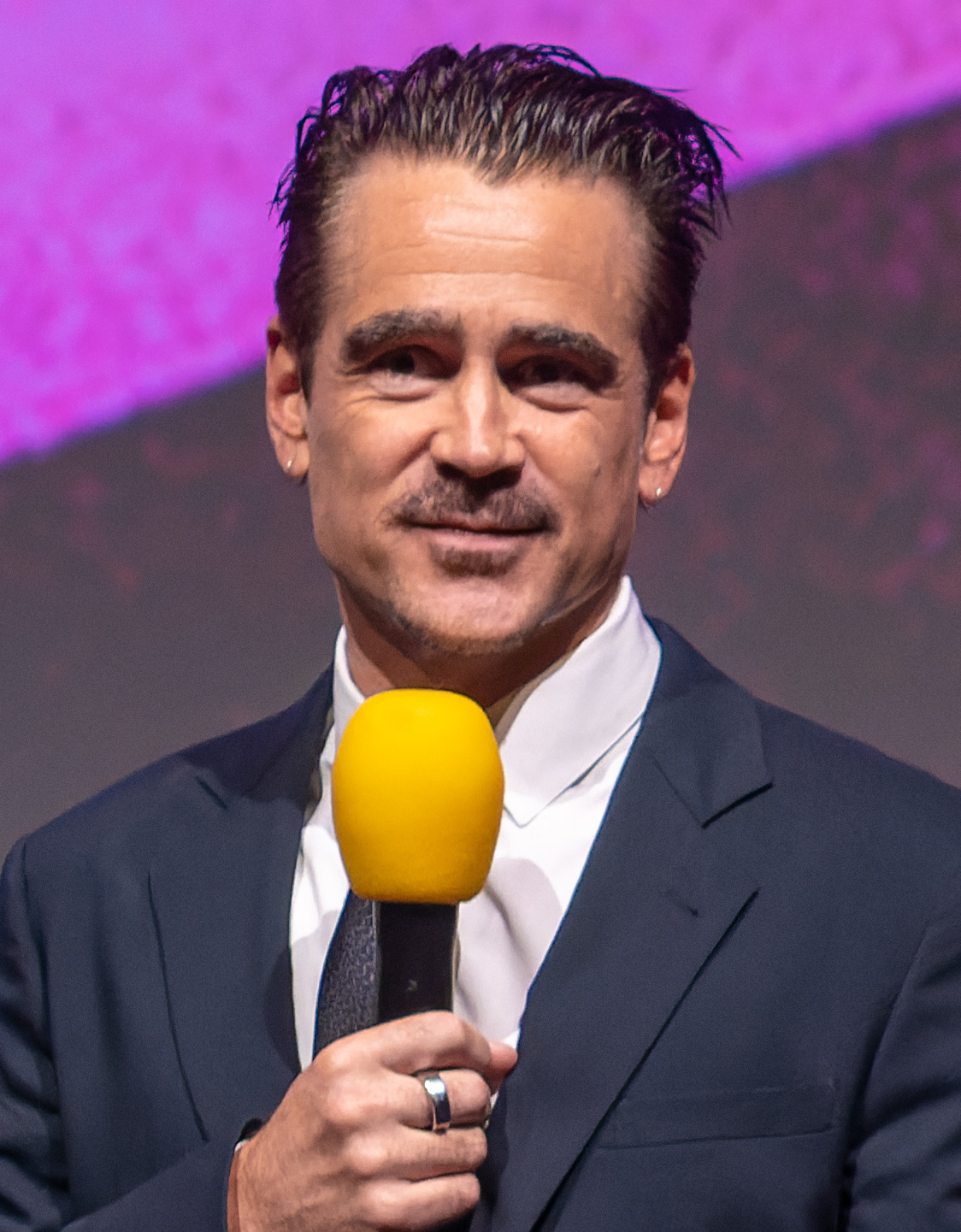
Colin Farrell, Actor of the Year winner

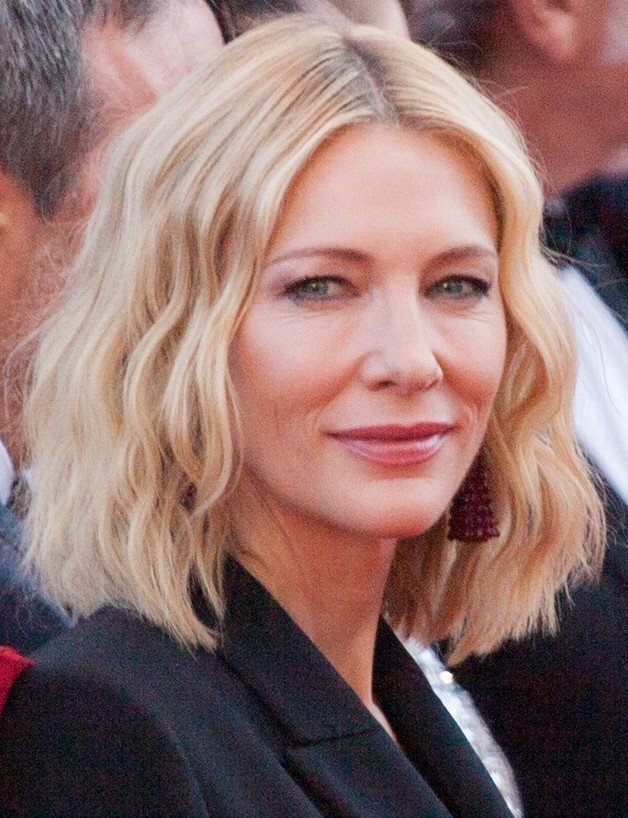
Cate Blanchett, Actress of the Year winner

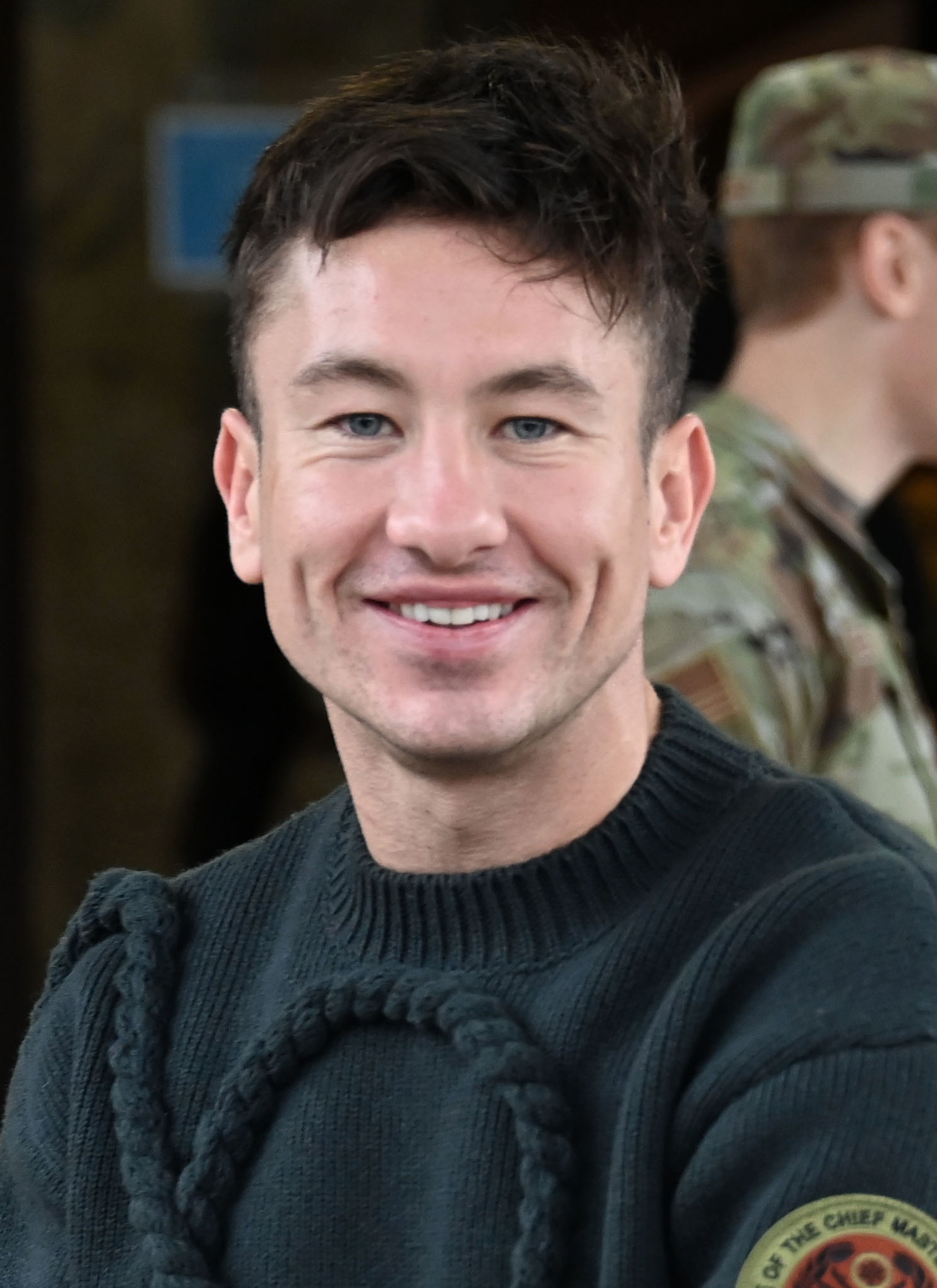
Barry Keoghan, Supporting Actor of the Year winner

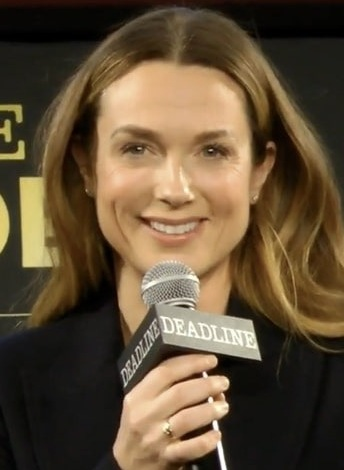
Kerry Condon, Supporting Actress of the Year winner

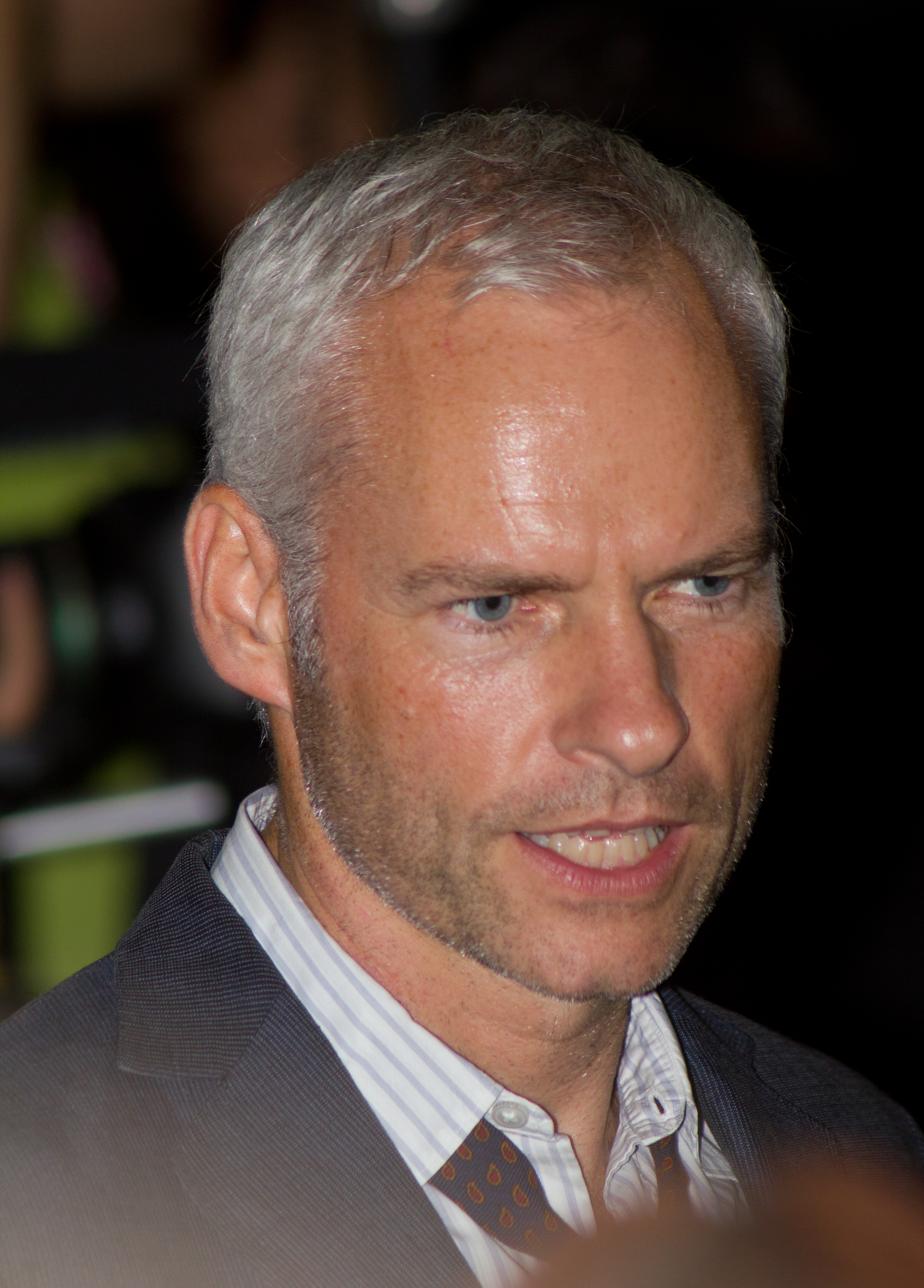
Martin McDonagh, Screenwriter of the Year winner

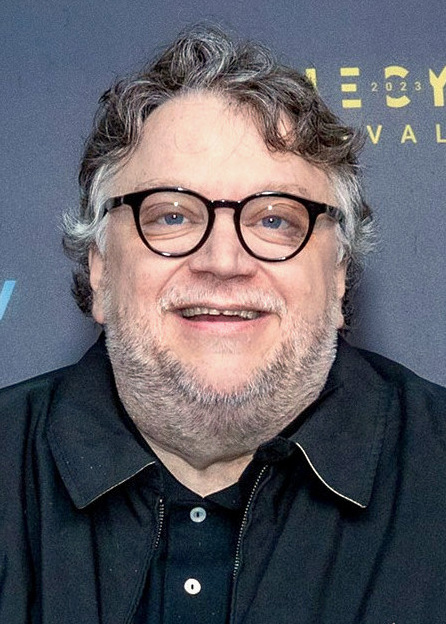
Guillermo del Toro, Technical Achievement Award co-winner

Winners are listed first and highlighted with boldface.

Film of the Year	Director of the Year
**Tár**; Aftersun; All the Beauty and the Bloodshed; The Banshees of Inisherin; Decision to Leave; Everything Everywhere All at Once; The Fabelmans; Living; Saint Omer; Top Gun: Maverick	**Todd Field – Tár**; Daniel Kwan and Daniel Scheinert – Everything Everywhere All at Once; Martin McDonagh – The Banshees of Inisherin; Park Chan-wook – Decision to Leave; Charlotte Wells – Aftersun
Actor of the Year	Actress of the Year
**Colin Farrell – The Banshees of Inisherin as Pádraic Súilleabháin**; Austin Butler – Elvis as Elvis Presley; Brendan Fraser – The Whale as Charlie; Paul Mescal – Aftersun as Calum Patterson; Bill Nighy – Living as Mr. Williams	**Cate Blanchett – Tár as Lydia Tár**; Ana de Armas – Blonde as Norma Jean Rae / Marilyn Monroe; Vicky Krieps – Corsage as Empress Elisabeth of Austria; Florence Pugh – The Wonder as Elizabeth "Lib" Wright; Michelle Yeoh – Everything Everywhere All at Once as Evelyn Quan Wang
Supporting Actor of the Year	Supporting Actress of the Year
**Barry Keoghan – The Banshees of Inisherin as Dominic Kearney**; Tom Burke – The Wonder as William Byrne; Brendan Gleeson – The Banshees of Inisherin as Colm Doherty; Brian Tyree Henry – Causeway as James Aucoin; Ke Huy Quan – Everything Everywhere All at Once as Waymond Wang	**Kerry Condon – The Banshees of Inisherin as Siobhán Súilleabháin**; Hong Chau – The Whale as Liz; Dolly de Leon – Triangle of Sadness as Abigail; Nina Hoss – Tár as Sharon Goodnow; Guslagie Malanda – Saint Omer as Laurence Coly
Screenwriter of the Year	Foreign Language Film of the Year
**Martin McDonagh – The Banshees of Inisherin**; Todd Field – Tár; Daniel Kwan and Daniel Scheinert – Everything Everywhere All at Once; Tony Kushner and Steven Spielberg – The Fabelmans; Charlotte Wells – Aftersun	**Decision to Leave (TIE)**; **The Quiet Girl (TIE)**; EO; RRR; Saint Omer
Documentary of the Year	The Attenborough Award: British/Irish Film of the Year
**All the Beauty and the Bloodshed**; All That Breathes; Fire of Love; Kurt Vonnegut: Unstuck in Time; Moonage Daydream	**The Banshees of Inisherin**; Aftersun; Living; The Quiet Girl; The Wonder
British/Irish Actor of the Year	British/Irish Actress of the Year
**Bill Nighy – Living**; Harris Dickinson – See How They Run, Triangle of Sadness, and Where the Crawdads Sing; Colin Farrell – After Yang, The Banshees of Inisherin, The Batman, and Thirteen Lives; Ralph Fiennes – The Forgiven and The Menu; Paul Mescal – Aftersun	**Florence Pugh – Don't Worry Darling, Puss in Boots: The Last Wish, and The Wonder**; Jessie Buckley – Men, Scrooge: A Christmas Carol, and Women Talking; Olivia Colman – Empire of Light, Joyride, Puss in Boots: The Last Wish, and Scrooge: A Christmas Carol; Emma Thompson – Good Luck to You, Leo Grande and Roald Dahl's Matilda the Musical; Letitia Wright – Aisha, Black Panther: Wakanda Forever, and The Silent Twins
Young British/Irish Performer of the Year	The Philip French Award: Breakthrough British/Irish Filmmaker of the Year
**Frankie Corio – Aftersun as Sophie**; Kíla Lord Cassidy – The Wonder as Anna O'Donnell / Nan; Catherine Clinch – The Quiet Girl as Cáit; Bella Ramsey – Catherine Called Birdy as Lady Catherine / Birdy; Alisha Weir – Roald Dahl's Matilda the Musical as Matilda Wormwood	**Charlotte Wells – Aftersun**; Katy Brand – Good Luck to You, Leo Grande; Colm Bairéad – The Quiet Girl; Frances O'Connor – Emily; Georgia Oakley – Blue Jean
British/Irish Short Film of the Year	Technical Achievement Award
**A Fox in the Night – Keeran Anwar Blessie**; Groom – Leyla Coll-O'Reilly; Honesty – Roxy Rezvany; A Letter to Black Men – Kiosa Sukami; Scale – Joseph Pierce	**Brian Leif Hansen and Guillermo del Toro – Guillermo del Toro's Pinocchio, animation**; Matias Boucard – Athena, cinematography; Ruth E. Carter – Black Panther: Wakanda Forever, costumes; Nina Gold – The Wonder, casting; Stephen Griffiths – Tár, sound design; Kim Ji-yong – Decision to Leave, cinematography; Catherine Martin – Elvis, costumes; Nick Powell – RRR, stunts; Paul Rogers – Everything Everywhere All at Once, film editing; Leslie Shatz – Blonde, sound design
