= Foster (short story) =

Novella by Claire Keegan

- Author: Claire Keegan
- Language: English
- Genre: short story/novella
- Set in: County Wexford, summer 1981
- Publisher: The New Yorker (short version); Faber and Faber
- Publication date: 10 February 2010 (short); September 2010
- Publication place: Ireland
- Media type: Print: paperback
- Pages: 88
- Awards: Davy Byrne's Irish Writing Award
- ISBN: 9780571255658
- OCLC: 502415194
- Preceded by: Walk the Blue Fields

"Foster" is a short story or novella by Irish author Claire Keegan, published in 2010.

== Plot ==
In 1981 Ireland, County Wexford, an unnamed girl is sent to live with foster parents on a farm, while her mother gives birth. She has no notion of when she will return home. In the strangers' house, she finds affection she has not known before, and slowly she begins to blossom in their care. She learns that her foster parents, the Kinsellas, had a deceased son. At the end of the summer, she returns home to her family.

== Reception ==
"Foster" has received a very positive reception, winning the 2009 Davy Byrne's Irish Writing Award (it was submitted for the award prior to publication). The Daily Telegraph compared it to the work of Seamus Heaney and William Trevor, while The Observer called it "Among the finest stories written recently in English." Recognition of the literary merit of Foster was reflected in its inclusion as a text prescribed for comparative study by the Department of Education and Training (An Roinn Oideachais agus Scoileanna) for the syllabus of the English Leaving Certificate examination in Ireland.

In Slovenia, the State Subject Commission for English for the General Matura (Državna komisija za splošno maturo za angleščino), operating under the National Examinations Centre (RIC), selected the novella as a prescribed literary text for the General Matura exam in English for 2026 and 2027.

== Adaptation ==
An audio version of "Foster" was broadcast on BBC Radio 4's "Afternoon Reading" on 9 March 2015, read by Irish actress Evanna Lynch.

In 2022, a film version was released in the Irish language: An Cailín Ciúin, starring Catherine Clinch and Carrie Crowley. In 2023, the film was nominated for an Academy Award for Best International Feature Film.
