= Who We Love =

- Directed by: Graham Cantwell
- Written by: Graham Cantwell; Katie McNeice
- Based on: Lily by Graham Cantwell
- Produced by: Edwina Forkin; Alan Fitzpatrick; Graham Cantwell
- Starring: Clara Harte; Dean Quinn; Amy-Joyce Hastings
- Cinematography: Austin Ray; Westin Ray
- Music by: Joseph Conlan
- Release date: 24 July 2021; (Galway)
- Running time: 92 minutes
- Country: Ireland
- Language: English

Who We Love is an Irish coming-of-age drama film directed by Graham Cantwell and written by Cantwell and Katie McNeice. It is a feature-length adaptation of Cantwell's 2016 short film Lily. It premiered at the 2021 Galway Film Fleadh.

== Cast ==
- Clara Harte as Lily
- Dean Quinn as Simon
- Amy-Joyce Hastings as Oonagh
- Venetia Bowe as Violet
- Amy Hughes as AJ
- Barry John Kinsella as Mr Murphy
- Danielle Galligan as Naomi
- Paul Ronan as Dermot
- Aisling O'Neill as Yvette
- Jimmy Smallhorne as Fran
- Lynette Callaghan as Miss O'Shea
- Alison McGirr as Celine
- Hallie Ridgeway as Emer
- Daniel Mahon as Paul
- Laurence O'Fuarain as Joe
- Niamh McCormack as Róisín
- Ian Gerard Whyte as Tony
- Jeanne Nicole Ní Áinle as Aisha
- Karen Kelly as Julie
- Clara Harte as Lily
- Ryan Lincoln as Taylor
- James Flynn as Julius
- Sarah Kinlen as Angela
- Geraldine McAlinden as Mrs. Fitzgerald
- Charlie Maher as Ultan
- Louise Bourke as Jodie
- Alicia Gerrard as Mandy
- Lynette Callaghan as Miss O'Shea
- Orla McGovern as Ms Brady
- Alekson L. Dall'Armellina as Arturo

== Production ==
Graham Cantwell's 2016 short film Lily screened at film festivals and received IFTA accolades. Cantwell returned to direct and write the feature version with Katie McNeice joining him as a writer. Cantwell also produced Who We Love alongside Edwina Forkin and Alan Fitzpatrick. The American duo the Ray Sisters did the cinematography for the film.

Clara Harte, Dean Quinn, and Amy-Joyce Hastings reprised the leads from the short film. Paul Ronan, Aisling O'Neill, Lynette Callaghan also reprised their supporting roles. Venetia Bowe replaced Leah McNamara as Violet. Also cast were Amy Hughes, Danielle Galligan, Jimmy Smallhorne, and Alison McGirr.

Principal photography took place in and around Dublin, and experienced disruptions due to the COVID-19 pandemic. Filming locations included the Donahies Community School, Dublin City Centre, the George, PantiBar, and Pennylane.

== Release ==
The film had its first screening on 24 July 2021 at the Galway Film Fleadh.

== Awards and nominations ==
Year	Award	Category	Recipient(s)	Result	Ref
2021	Galway Film Fleadh	New Talent Award	Clara Harte	Nominated	
2021	Kerry Film Festival	Best Fiction Feature	Who We Love	Won	
2021	Kerry Film Festival	Rising Talent Award	Katie McNeice	Won	
2022	Irish Film & Television Awards	Best Film	Who We Love	Nominated	
2022	Irish Film & Television Awards	Best Director	Graham Cantwell	Nominated	
2022	Irish Film & Television Awards	Best Script	Graham Cantwell and Katie McNeice	Nominated	
2022	Irish Film & Television Awards	Actress in a Supporting Role – Film	Amy-Joyce Hastings	Nominated	
2022	Irish Film & Television Awards	Actor in a Supporting Role – Film	Dean Quinn	Nominated	
2022	Irish Film & Television Awards	Original Music	Joseph Conlan	Nominated	
