= Amy-Joyce Hastings =

Irish actress

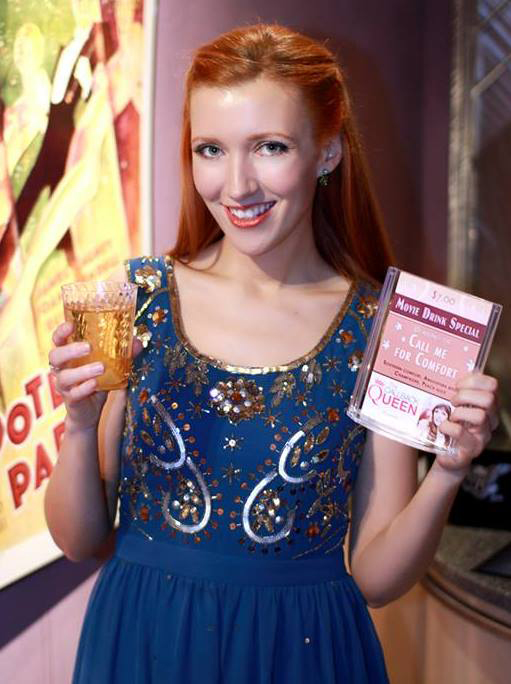
- Amy-Joyce Hastings at The Callback Queen US Premiere at the Jean Cocteau Cinema
- Born: 24 September 1980 (age 45); Dublin, Ireland
- Occupation: Actress
- Years active: 1990–present
- Website: http://www.amyjoycehastings.com

Amy-Joyce Hastings (born 24 September 1980) is an Irish actress who was nominated for Best Actress in a Supporting Role - Film at the 2022 IFTA Film & Drama Awards for her performance in Who We Love.

== Early life and career ==
Amy-Joyce Hastings was born in Ireland to parents Robert and Catríona Hastings. Taking a very early interest in acting she enrolled in drama classes at the Gaiety School of Acting when it opened in Dublin in the late 1980s. Here she was scouted by Bond movies casting director Debbie McWilliams and eventually cast in the role of Geraldine Quinton in Fools of Fortune opposite Julie Christie, Iain Glen and Mary Elizabeth Mastrantonio.

A couple of years later, following two final rounds of casting at London's Pinewood Studios she narrowly lost out on the role of Mary Lennox in Warner Bros' The Secret Garden, directed by Agnieszka Holland. Continuing dance and acting classes throughout her younger years, she appeared in a variety of productions and made regular appearances on RTÉ youth interest television programs such as Jo Maxi and Pajo's Junkbox, as well as reviewing children's films for the Pat Kenny radio show.

In 1998 she was shortlisted for the title role in a film – adapted from another William Trevor novel – Felicia's Journey, directed by Atom Egoyan. However she elected instead to train for three years at the Samuel Beckett Centre in Trinity College Dublin – Ireland's first and only acting degree course. She graduated with a distinction in 2001, and began a full-time acting career.

She has worked in film, television and theatre. Hastings' first role was as a child actor in the 1990 film Fools of Fortune directed by Pat O'Connor.

She featured in Season 1 of The Tudors alongside Henry Cavill.

She has appeared in a number of independent films such as Brit flick Little Deaths (which premiered at Film4 Frightfest and the SXSW festival in the US) and in the lead role of Kate Loughlin in Romantic Comedy The Callback Queen which received a US run at George R. R. Martin's Jean Cocteau Cinema in February 2014 and was nominated for two IFTA awards in 2016 following its domestic cinema release. She played Iseult in Len Collin's film Sanctuary, which scored a 100% rating on the Rotten Tomatoes website from critics and was proclaimed the Best Irish Feature Film of 2017 by the Dublin Film Critics' Circle. She can currently be seen in The Green Sea, starring Katharine Isabelle and directed by Randal Plunkett. She has also starred in a number of award-winning short films, and received the 2017 Underground Cinema Award for Best Supporting Actress for her portrayal of Oonagh in the IFTA Nominated LGBT drama Lily.

== Filmography ==
=== Film ===
Year	Title	Role	Notes
1990	Fools of Fortune	Geraldine Quinton	
1997	The Very Stuff	Nicola	Short film
2003	Sex and Sensibility	Maria	Video
2006	Double Take	Agent Amanda Sharpe	Video
2007	W.C.	Helen	
2007	Poetic License	Aoife	Short film
2008	Duality	Dr. Sarah O'Connor	Short film
2009	The Letter	Lillian	Short film
2010	Dancer	Anna	Short film
2011	Little Deaths	Lucy	
2013	The Callback Queen	Kate Loughlin	
2014	Duets		
2014	Thin Air	Cara	
2014	Footsteps of Angels	Charlotte	
2016	Lily	Oonagh	Nominated Best Live Action Short Film 2017 IFTA Film & Drama Awards Winner Best Supporting Actress, Underground Cinema Awards Dublin 2017
2016	Sanctuary	Iseult	Winner Dublin Film Critics Circle Award 2017
2016	The Gaelic Curse	Kelly	
2017	Parfum	Ava	Short film
2017	The Family Way	Sandra	Short film
2019	Close to Nothing At All	Ava Collins	Short film
2021	The Green Sea	Vicky	
2021	Who We Love	Oonagh	Nominated Best Actress in a Supporting Role - Film 2022 IFTA Film & Drama Awards

=== Television ===
Year	Title	Role	Notes
1995	Finbar's Class	Crystal	4 episodes
2005	A Scare at Bedtime	Electrocutioner / Buster Cherry's Wife	Episodes: "Dead Funny", "Truth or Die"
2007	Cinephilia	Jan Harlan	TV film
2007	The Tudors	Mole Girl	1 episode: Message to the Emperor
2010	The Guards	Sheila O'Briain	Episodes: "Brother", "Good Mule"
2010	An Cúpla Corr	Linda	

== Theatre career ==
Hastings has many stage credits in both the UK and Ireland. Amongst these are roles as Carol in Oleanna by David Mamet, Estelle Rigault in No Exit by Jean-Paul Sartre, Cathy Calhoun in the first European production of Orange Flower Water by Craig Wright, and the world premiere of The Night Garden, developed by the Royal National Theatre Studio and first performed at the Northcott Theatre in Exeter.

Her Shakespeare credits include the role of Regan in King Lear and most recently Miranda in The Tempest in July 2013. During March and April 2012, Hastings played the role of real life Titanic stewardess Violet Jessop in the world premiere of the first full-length stageplay about the Titanic; Iceberg – Right Ahead! at London's Gatehouse Theatre to commemorate the 100th Anniversary of Titanic's maiden voyage.
