= The Fallen Drakes =

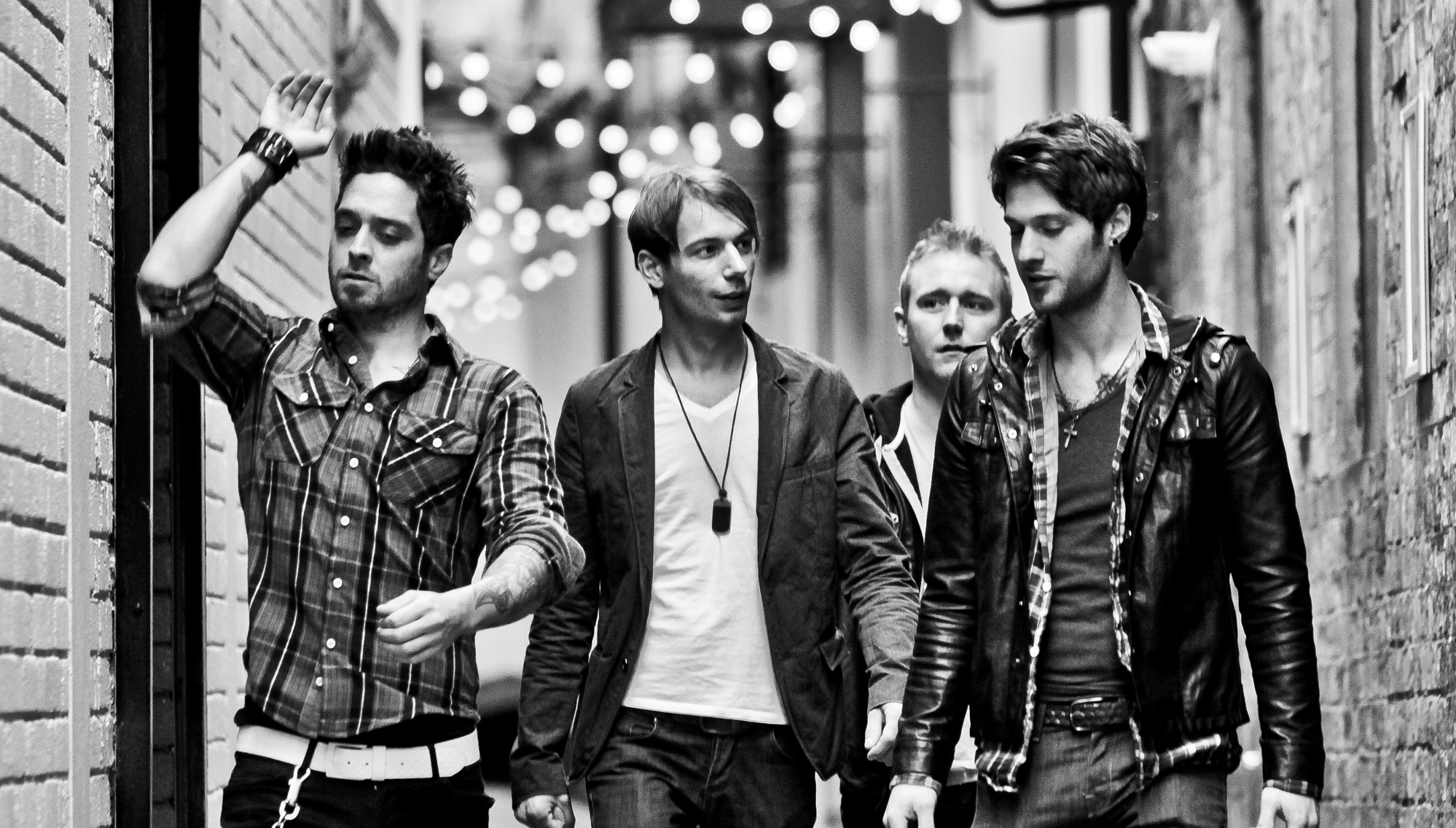

Background information
- Origin: Dublin, Republic of Ireland
- Genres: Alternative rock
- Years active: 2010–2014
- Past members: Brian McGovern, Nabil Ali, Hyder Ali, Michal Bartolen

The Fallen Drakes were an alternative rock band from Dublin, Ireland consisting of Twin Brother's Nabil "Nabz" Ali (Drums) and Hyder Ali (Bass) along with Brian McGovern (Vocals & Guitar) and Michal "Mickey" Bartolen (Lead Guitar).

Formed in 2010, they released their debut E.P. 'Death of an Actress' in January 2011 and their debut single, 'Girl From New York' in July 2011.

== Biography ==
When Musician Brothers Nabz and Hyder Ali, were travelling the United States in the summer of 2009, they met Brian McGovern - an Irish Singer Songwriter that was looking to play with like minded musicians. They made plans to start a band on their return to Ireland.

With a handful of songs written, the newly formed group began demoing tracks to friends. They needed a lead guitar player to complete the line up and their call was answered by Michal Bartolen; a native of Slovakia that was in Ireland, looking to join a new band.

In late 2010, the group began penning songs for an upcoming E.P. whilst playing live shows and perfecting their sound.

Released their E.P Anymore Cinema in November 2013, go buy it. FOLLOW ON TWITTER @thefallendrakes

== Death of an Actress - E.P. (January 2011) ==
- In January 2011, The Fallen Drakes gained media attention when they released their debut E.P. ‘Death of an Actress’, with celebrated producer Ger McDonnell (U2 and Kasabian) handling production duties.
- This recognition led to The Fallen Drakes playing a number of Sold Out shows in Dublin and Cork, as well as receiving an invitation to play showcases in London by the UK Discovering Arts Music Group.
- During this time top UK Industry Bloggers short-listed the band out of tens of thousands of others for a chance to play the Main Stage at Glastonbury 2011. The Fallen Drakes were one of only a handful of Irish bands to make this short-list.
- Ireland's leading music magazine Hotpress has featured The Fallen Drakes on numerous occasions, comparing them to the hugely successful Irish band The Script. The band has also been widely acclaimed in other popular culture reads such as ‘U Magazine’, The Daily Mail and ‘The Sunday World’, attributing The Fallen Drakes as being the ‘Next Big Thing’.
- The Fallen Drakes made history in March 2011 by becoming one of Ireland's first unsigned bands to play the O2 Dublin in front of 13,000 people when they supported The Commitments on their sell-out reunion show. The Fallen Drakes overcame competition from 430 bands from across Ireland and netted approximately 13,000 out of 20,000 votes from the public in a competition hosted by Tony Fenton on Today FM.
- On Thursday 19 May 2011 the Dublin-based quartet took part in another unsigned band competition, judged by Aiken Promotions, Radio Nova & Universal Records. The event was held at Vicar Street and saw The Fallen Drakes triumph yet again. The Fallen Drakes supported Bon Jovi before 35,000 people in Dublin's RDS Arena on 30 June 2011.

== Girl From New York - Single (July 2011) ==
- The Fallen Drakes released their debut single ‘Girl From New York’ on 15 July 2011. The band marked this occasion with an in-store appearance in Tower Records, Dublin and a Headline Sold Out show in Whelan's, Dublin.
- Girl From New York went straight into the Irish iTunes Rock Chart at Number 1 and finished in the IRMA Singles Chart at Number 34.
- In September 2011 The Fallen Drakes were confirmed for the Soundtrack to award-winning Irish Director Graham Cantwell's forthcoming movie The Callback Queen.
- On 13 October 2011 The Fallen Drakes were announced as the RTÉ Breakthrough Artist of 2011 at a Gala Concert in RTÉ Studios.

== January 2012 onwards ==
The Fallen Drakes started 2012 off with both Today FM & RTÉ 2FM heralding the band as their 'Pick for 2012'. Shortly following this, UTV Radio & FM104 awarded The Fallen Drakes as the first recipient of their 'Select Irish' initiative, placing The Fallen Drakes on heavy rotation on their award-winning playlist and also amongst their national sister stations.

According to The Fallen Drakes' Facebook & Twitter, the band are presently writing and recording their debut album with Ger McDonnell back in the producers chair alongside new addition; Philip Magee (The Script).
