= Alison McGirr =

Australian actress (born 1983/84)

- Born: 1983 or 1984 (age 41–42); Australia
- Citizenship: Australian, Irish
- Occupation(s): Actress · producer · writer
- Years active: 2012–present
- Known for: Ladies in Black; Thirty
- Height: 1.70 m (5 ft 7 in)

Allison McGirr (born 1983/84) is an Australian actress of Irish descent. She had her first role in the Australian television show Home and Away in 2013. She is known for playing Charlie Maddox on the Australian show Thirty, and Patty in the film Ladies in Black.

== Early life ==
McGirr was born in Australia to Marrie Caroll of Rathoe and Tom McGirr of County Tyrone, Republic of Ireland. Her family moved back to Ireland in 1996, and she attended Tullow Community School in Carlow, Ireland. She then attended St. Bernadette's Primary School in Castle Hill, New South Wales, Australia, and Marian College in Kenthurst, NSW. She has a brother named Thomas and a sister named Siobhan.

She attended and graduated with a Bachelor in Fine Arts in Acting from the Queensland University of Technology in 2011.

== Career ==
McGirr divides her career between Irish and Australian industries. Her first role was as Molly Brenner in the Australian television show Home and Away. In 2014, she played in the horror series Penny Dreadful, written by John Logan and directed by Sam Mendes.

She had a role in the 2018 Australian film Ladies in Black, based on the 1993 novel The Women in Black by Madeleine St. John. She auditioned via self-tape while in Los Angeles, California, United States.

McGirr appeared on the History Channel's show Vikings, as well as in short films The Interior of a Wandering Mind, A Single Woman's Guide to Life, and the feature film Lily.

== Personal life ==
As of 2013, she was engaged to actor and director Sam Atwell, and lived in Dublin with him. She currently lives between Ireland, Australia, and the United States.

In 2021, she held a fundraising event in Willawong, Queensland, Australia, for her cousin Stefan Carroll, who suffered a traumatic spinal injury.

== Filmography ==
Key
†	Denotes productions that have not yet been released

Year	Title	Role	Notes	Refs.
2012–2013	Home and Away	Molly Brenner	TV series; Australian	
2013	The Callback Queen	April	Voice role; Irish	
2014	Penny Dreadful	Beautiful Young Woman	Episode: "Night Work"	
2015	Damaged	Detective Anna Mitchell		
2015	Duets	Lena, Robin	Segments: "Safehouse," "Cold"	
2016	A Single Woman's Guide to Life		Also producer	
2017–2021	Thirty	Charlie Maddox	TV series; 12 episodes	
2017	Vikings	Gerd Sursson	Episode: "Crossings"	
2018	Ladies in Black	Patty		
2021	Good Vibes Only	Sarah	Short film	
2021	Who We Love	Celine		
2023	Transfusion	Billy's Lawyer		
2023	Year Of	Louise	Episode #1.7	
