= Goodnight, Charlene =

- Directed by: Chris Zuhdi
- Written by: Chris Zuhdi
- Starring: Chris Zuhdi; Melanie San Millan; Daniel Ross Owens; Marissa Woolf; Chris Messersmith
- Cinematography: Chris Zuhdi
- Edited by: Charles Willis
- Music by: Joseph Conlan
- Production company: Skytrain Films
- Distributed by: Skytrain Films
- Release date: 19 December 2017
- Running time: 80 minutes
- Country: United States
- Language: English

Goodnight, Charlene is a 2017 American crime thriller film directed by Chris Zuhdi, starring Zuhdi, Melanie San Millan, Daniel Ross Owens, Marissa Woolf and Chris Messersmith.

== Cast ==
- Chris Zuhdi as Charlie Potter
- Melanie San Millan as Charlene
- Daniel Ross Owens as Billy
- Marissa Woolf as Rebecca
- Chris Messersmith as Mr. Flynn

== Reception ==
Bobby LePire of Film Threat gave the film a score of 5 out of 10 and wrote that while "decently directed, beautifully lit, and most of the cast are do well all things considered", "two of the leads are quite dull, the script is trying too hard to be duplicitous, and winds up going nowhere all that compelling."

Noel Murray of the Los Angeles Times wrote that the film "doesn’t just look cheap", it "looks like most of it was shot in the same under-lighted room, with different wall decorations."
