= Alison Hawkins =

Alison or Allison Hawkins may refer to:

- Allison Hawkins (Jericho), fictional character in Jericho
- Alison Hawkins, character in The January Man
