= Poison Pen (2014 film) =

- Directed by: Steven Benedict; Lorna Fitzsimons; Jennifer Shortall
- Written by: Eoin Colfer; Graham Cantwell
- Produced by: Áine Coady; Sharon Cronin
- Starring: Lochlann Ó Mearáin; Aoibhinn McGinnity; Paul Ronan; Aaron Heffernan
- Cinematography: Penny Merelle Gray
- Edited by: Richy O' Connell
- Music by: Louise Heaney
- Production company: Filmbase
- Release date: 11 July 2014 (Galway Film Fleadh)
- Running time: 95 minutes
- Country: Ireland
- Language: English

Poison Pen is a 2014 Irish comedy feature film based on a screenplay by author Eoin Colfer, directed by Steven Benedict, Lorna Fitzsimons and Jennifer Shortall.

== Synopsis ==
P.C. Molloy (Lochlann Ó Mearáin), a Booker Prize–winning author, is coerced into writing for a tabloid gossip magazine. Cultures clash and sparks fly as the cerebral Molloy finds himself immersed in the world of vain celebrities and he begins to fall for his boss (Aoibhinn McGinnity). Poison Pen asks questions about the nature of celebrity, integrity and deception.

== Cast ==
- Lochlann Ó Mearáin as PC Molloy
- Aoibhinn McGinnity as April
- Paul Ronan as Darcy
- Aaron Heffernan as Kurt
- Susan Loughnane as Shona
- Lauryn Canny as Sally
- Mary Murray as Dora
- Gemma-Leah Devereux as Eva
- Ryan O'Shaughnessy as Piers
- Sophie Vavasseur as Jessica
- Lyn Larkin as Julie
- Siobhan Bolton as Popstar

== Reception ==
The film received mixed reviews, the Chicago Reader described it as "formulaic" whereas The Hollywood Reporter described it as "crafty entertainment". Diarmaid Blehein of Film Ireland considered it a " ... quirky comedy that sucks us in to the grizzly world of magazine journalism, while at the same time entertains us immensely."
