= The Quiet Girl =

2022 Irish coming-of-age film

- Poster
- Irish: An Cailín Ciúin
- Directed by: Colm Bairéad
- Screenplay by: Colm Bairéad
- Based on: Foster by Claire Keegan
- Produced by: Cleona Ní Chrualaoí
- Starring: Carrie Crowley; Andrew Bennett; Catherine Clinch; Michael Patric; Kate Nic Chonaonaigh
- Cinematography: Kate McCullough
- Edited by: John Murphy
- Music by: Stephen Rennicks
- Production companies: Inscéal; Fís Éireann / Screen Ireland; TG4; Broadcasting Authority of Ireland
- Distributed by: Break Out Pictures
- Release dates: 11 February 2022 (Berlinale); 12 May 2022 (Ireland)
- Running time: 94 minutes
- Country: Ireland
- Languages: Irish; English
- Budget: €1.2 million
- Box office: $6.785 million

The Quiet Girl (Irish: An Cailín Ciúin [ənˠ ˈkalʲiːnʲ cuːnʲ]) is a 2022 Irish coming-of-age drama film written and directed by Colm Bairéad, in his feature film debut. Based on the 2010 short story "Foster" by Claire Keegan, it stars Catherine Clinch, Carrie Crowley and Andrew Bennett.

Set in 1981, the film follows a withdrawn nine-year-old girl raised by neglectful parents among many other siblings, who experiences a loving home for the first time when she spends the summer on a farm in Rinn Gaeltacht, County Waterford, alone with a married couple who are distant relatives. It is mostly in the Irish language, although it also contains parts in English.

The Quiet Girl premiered on 11 February 2022 at the 72nd Berlin International Film Festival, where it won two awards, before being theatrically released in Ireland on 12 May 2022. It received critical acclaim for its emotional weight, story, and performances. It received ten nominations at the 18th Irish Film & Television Awards and won seven awards including Best Film, Best Director, and Best Actress for the then 11-year old Clinch. It was later elected as Ireland's submission for Best International Feature Film at the 95th Academy Awards, and became the first Irish film in history to achieve the nomination; it also received BAFTA Award nominations for Best Film Not in the English Language and Best Adapted Screenplay.

== Plot ==
In the summer of 1981, nine-year-old Cáit is one of many siblings, living with her impoverished and neglectful parents in rural Ireland. She struggles to fit in at school, including an incident where she feels ashamed when a cup of milk spills onto her lap. With her mother pregnant again, they decide to send their quiet daughter away to live with middle-aged distant cousin Eibhlín Cinnsealach (Kinsella) and her husband Seán.

When Cáit arrives, Eibhlín immediately welcomes her into the Cinnsealach home, showing her love and teaching her how to do chores around the house and farm. She shows Cáit a well on the property, warning that it is deep and advising caution when retrieving water from it.

Eibhlín places Cáit in a spare bedroom, where she later fears an adult entering the room and eventually wets the bed. As Cáit's luggage was left behind in the car, Eibhlín initially dresses her in their late boy's clothes found in the wardrobe. Later, she buys Cáit new girls' clothes.

Seán is withdrawn and initially acts coldly towards his foster daughter. One day when Eibhlín is away, Cáit accompanies him to the far side of the farm, where he cleans the milking parlour. While he is occupied, Cáit wanders off. When Seán notices her absence, he panics and searches for her on the property.

After finding Cáit, Seán scolds her and orders her never to wander off again. Frightened by his sudden bout of anger, she runs back to the house. Seán expresses remorse and begins to make an effort to bond with Cáit. He encourages her to run to fetch the mail, turning it into a pleasant ritual, and praises her speed. Slowly, Cáit opens up to Seán, and they become close.

One day, the Cinnsealachs attend a wake. Seeing Cáit getting restless at the event while Eibhlín and Seán comfort their friends, a gossipy neighbour offers to look after her for a couple of hours. Eibhlín hesitates but agrees. While the woman and Cáit walk together, the former reveals that the Cinnsealachs had a young son who drowned in the family slurry pit some years before Cáit's arrival.

When the Cinnsealachs later pick Cáit up from the neighbour's house, they notice her withdrawn demeanour and ask what the neighbour said to her. Cáit tells them the truth, which quietly upsets them, but they do not deny the neighbour's story.

Over a month into her stay, Cáit's mother has given birth and has requested the Cinnsealachs return Cáit in time for the start of the school year. Cáit, Eibhlín, and Seán each express their subdued sadness at having to part. Cáit sneaks off to the well to fetch water but falls in, overwhelmed by her rapidly filling bucket. A distressed Eibhlín, searching for her, finds her soaked and shivering and comforts her. Cáit develops a cold.

A few days later, Eibhlín and Seán drive Cáit back to her home. Her mother barely acknowledges her daughter's return, and her father immediately chastises her for sneezing. After a tension-filled conversation between the adults, with Eibhlín telling Cáit's parents that the girl is welcome to stay with them at any time, they reluctantly bid farewell to Cáit and begin to drive off.

While watching the car disappear down the long driveway, Cáit suddenly sprints toward it, managing to catch up to the couple as Seán is closing the gate. They embrace, while Eibhlín sobs quietly in the car. As Cáit looks over Seán's shoulder, she sees her father angrily marching toward them and says, "Daddy." She closes her eyes and says "Daddy" again.

== Cast ==
- Catherine Clinch as Cáit
- Carrie Crowley as Eibhlín Kinsella
- Andrew Bennett as Seán Kinsella
- Michael Patric as Da
- Kate Nic Chonaonaigh as Mam

== Production ==
The Quiet Girl is based on Foster, a 2010 novella in English by Claire Keegan. The film was originally titled Fanacht ("Waiting"). It was filmed in Dublin and County Meath, with Meath locations including Summerhill, Moynalvey (including Fagan's Pub), Curraghtown, Garlow Cross, Trim, and Clonymeath.

== Release and reception ==
The Quiet Girl premiered at the Berlinale on 11 February 2022. It won the Grand Prix from the Generation Kplus International Jury for Best Film and received a special mention from the children's jury. The jury stated that "It is a film with a delicate story full of details about childhood, grief, parenthood and rebuilding a family. The very strong narrative is combined with a stunning cinematography. The sound and the images create a unique atmosphere."

It was also shown at the 2022 Dublin International Film Festival on 23 February, and at the Glasgow Film Festival in March 2022. It went on general release in Ireland on 12 May 2022. It was also selected for the 'World Cinema' section of 27th Busan International Film Festival to be screened in October 2022.

=== Box office ===
It broke box office records for the opening weekend of an Irish-language film and became the highest-grossing Irish-language film of all time, dethroning Arracht, released in 2021, that ended its run with €164,000.

=== Critical response ===
On Rotten Tomatoes the film has a 97% approval rating based on reviews from 146 critics, with an average rating of 8.7/10. The website's consensus reads, "A remarkable debut for writer-director Colm Bairéad, The Quiet Girl offers a deceptively simple reminder that the smallest stories can leave a large emotional impact." On Metacritic the film has a weighted average score of 89 out of 100 based on 29 critic reviews, indicating "universal acclaim".

=== Accolades ===
The Quiet Girl received 10 nominations at the 18th Irish Film & Television Awards (IFTAs) in March 2022, and won in seven categories. The film was the first Irish-language film to showcase at the Berlin Film Festival and win the Best Film award at the IFTAs. In December 2022 the film became the first Irish-language film to be shortlisted for an Oscar in the Best International Feature Film category.

On 24 January 2023, the film was nominated for the Academy Award for Best International Feature Film at the 95th Academy Awards, becoming the first Irish film to be nominated in the category's history.

| Award | Date of ceremony | Category | Recipients | Result | Ref. |
|---|---|---|---|---|---|
| Academy Awards | 12 March 2023 | Best International Feature Film | Ireland | Nominated | |
| American Society of Cinematographers Awards | 5 March 2023 | Spotlight Award | Kate McCullough | Nominated | |
| Belgian Film Critics Association | 6 January 2024 | Grand Prix | The Quiet Girl | Won | |
| British Academy Film Awards | 19 February 2023 | Best Adapted Screenplay | Colm Bairéad | Nominated | |
| British Academy Film Awards | 19 February 2023 | Best Film Not in the English Language | The Quiet Girl | Nominated | |
| Berlin International Film Festival | 17 February 2022 | The Grand Prix of the International Jury in Generation Kplus | An Cailín Ciúin | Won | |
| Berlin International Film Festival | 17 February 2022 | Special Mention from Children’s Jury | An Cailín Ciúin | Won | |
| Dublin International Film Festival | 27 February 2022 | Best Irish Film | An Cailín Ciúin | Won | |
| Dublin International Film Festival | 27 February 2022 | Audience Award | An Cailín Ciúin | Won | |
| Dublin International Film Festival | 27 February 2022 | Aer Lingus Discovery Award | Colm Bairéad | Won | |
| Golden Reel Awards | 26 February 2023 | Outstanding Achievement in Sound Editing – Foreign Language Feature | Steve Fanagan, Louise Burton, Caoimhe Doyle | Nominated | |
| IFTA Film & Drama Awards | 12 March 2022 | Best Film | An Cailín Ciúin | Won | |
| IFTA Film & Drama Awards | 12 March 2022 | Best Director - Film | Colm Bairéad | Won | |
| IFTA Film & Drama Awards | 12 March 2022 | Best Lead Actress - Film | Catherine Clinch | Won | |
| IFTA Film & Drama Awards | 12 March 2022 | Best Supporting Actress - Film | Carrie Crowley | Nominated | |
| IFTA Film & Drama Awards | 12 March 2022 | Best Editing | John Murphy | Won | |
| IFTA Film & Drama Awards | 12 March 2022 | Best Production Design | Emma Lowney | Won | |
| IFTA Film & Drama Awards | 12 March 2022 | Best Cinematography | Kate McCullough | Won | |
| IFTA Film & Drama Awards | 12 March 2022 | Best Costume Design | Louise Stanton | Nominated | |
| IFTA Film & Drama Awards | 12 March 2022 | Best Sound | Steve Fanagan, John "Bob" Brennan, Brendan Rehill | Nominated | |
| IFTA Film & Drama Awards | 12 March 2022 | Best Original Music | Stephen Rennicks | Won | |
| IFTA Film & Drama Awards | 12 March 2022 | Screen Ireland Rising Star Award | Colm Bairéad | Won | |
| London Film Critics' Circle | 5 February 2023 | British/Irish Film of the Year | An Cailín Ciúin | Nominated | |
| London Film Critics' Circle | 5 February 2023 | Foreign Language Film of the Year | An Cailín Ciúin | Won | |
| London Film Critics' Circle | 5 February 2023 | Breakthrough British/Irish Filmmaker of the Year | Colm Bairéad | Nominated | |
| London Film Critics' Circle | 5 February 2023 | Young British/Irish Performer of the Year | Catherine Clinch | Nominated | |
| Palm Springs International Film Festival | 16 January 2023 | Best International Feature Film | An Cailín Ciúin | Nominated | |
| Satellite Awards | 11 February 2023 | Best Motion Picture – International | An Cailín Ciúin | Nominated | |
| Sydney Film Festival | 19 June 2022 | Best Film | An Cailín Ciúin | Nominated | |
| Sydney Film Festival | 19 June 2022 | Audience Awards | An Cailín Ciúin | 3rd place | |
| Taipei Film Festival | 8 July 2022 | Audience Choice Award | An Cailín Ciúin | Won | |
| Taipei Film Festival | 8 July 2022 | International New Talent Competition - Grand Prize | An Cailín Ciúin | Nominated | |
| Valladolid International Film Festival | 29 October 2022 | Silver Spike | An Cailín Ciúin | Won | |
| Valladolid International Film Festival | 29 October 2022 | Audience Award | An Cailín Ciúin | Won | |

== See also ==
- List of Academy Award winners and nominees from Ireland
- List of submissions to the 95th Academy Awards for Best International Feature Film
- List of Irish submissions for the Academy Award for Best International Feature Film
