= Kate McCullough =

Irish cinematographer

Kate McCullough is an Irish cinematographer. She is best known for working on The Quiet Girl for which she received the European Film Award for Best Cinematographer.

== Early life ==
Kate McCullough spent her childhood on a dairy and onion farm in Meath, Ireland. She first became interested in film when she was home sick from school and her mother rented a movie to entertain her.

== Education ==
Kate McCullough went to Dún Laoghaire Institute of Art, Design, and Technology. Post-graduation, she attended Lodz Film School in Poland, for which she learned how to speak Polish.

== Accolades ==
=== Nominations ===
- Oscar nominee Best International Feature Film 2022
- BAFTA Nominee Film not in the English Language 2022
- ASC Spotlight Award Nominee 2023
- Girls on Film Nominee Best Cinematographer 2022
- Best Cinematography Nominee, Irish Film TV Awards 2020
- Emmy Nominee Outstanding Lighting Direction and Scenic Design 2018
- Best Cinematography Nominee, Irish Film TV Awards 2014

=== Awards ===
- European Film Award for Best Cinematographer 2022
- Best Cinematography award at Sundance 2010
- Donal Gilligan Award Best Cinematography Galway Film Festival, Ireland 2011
- Donal Gilligan Award Best Cinematography Galway Film Festival, Ireland 2016
- Súil Eile Award, Best Cinematography Irish Film Festival, London, UK 2017
- Emmy Winner Outstanding Science and Technology Documentary 2018
- Golden Frog for Best Cinematography Docudrama Energa Camerimage International Film Festival of the Art of Cinematography, Torun, Poland 2018
- Best Cinematography Irish Film +TV Awards 2021
