= Mark Killeen =

British film and television actor

Mark Killeen is a British film and television actor.

His film credits include Rise of the Footsoldier, The Dark Knight Rises and 300: Rise of an Empire. He appeared in Indiana Jones and the Dial of Destiny. He played the lead role in two romantic comedies from 2013, British feature The Callback Queen and The Right Juice.

On television Killeen appeared in the Doctor Who episode "Let's Kill Hitler", as well as two episodes of Waking the Dead. He played Mero, the Titan's Bastard in Game of Thrones, episode 8 of season 3 "Second Sons". He also appears as Ken's father in Street Fighter: Assassin's Fist.
