= Small Things like These (film) =

2024 film by Tim Mielants

- UK release poster
- Directed by: Tim Mielants
- Screenplay by: Enda Walsh
- Based on: Small Things like These by Claire Keegan
- Produced by: Matt Damon; Cillian Murphy; Alan Moloney; Drew Vinton; Jeff Robinov
- Starring: Cillian Murphy; Eileen Walsh; Michelle Fairley; Clare Dunne; Helen Behan; Emily Watson
- Cinematography: Frank van den Eeden
- Edited by: Alain Dessauvage
- Music by: Senjan Jansen
- Production companies: Artists Equity; Big Things Films; Wilder Content
- Distributed by: Lionsgate (Ireland and United Kingdom); Dutch FilmWorks (Benelux)
- Release dates: 15 February 2024 (Berlinale); 1 November 2024 (Ireland and United Kingdom)
- Running time: 98 minutes
- Countries: Ireland; Belgium
- Language: English
- Budget: $3 million
- Box office: $14.4 million

Small Things like These is a 2024 historical drama film directed by Tim Mielants and adapted by Enda Walsh from the 2021 novella by Claire Keegan. It stars Cillian Murphy (who also serves as a producer), Eileen Walsh, Michelle Fairley, Emily Watson, Clare Dunne, and Helen Behan. An international co-production between Ireland and Belgium, its plot focuses on the infamous Magdalene laundries in Ireland.

Small Things like These had its world premiere at the 74th Berlin International Film Festival on 15 February 2024, and was released in Ireland and the United Kingdom on 1 November 2024. It received positive reviews from critics.

== Plot ==
In late December 1985, Bill Furlong is a hard-working coal merchant living in the Irish town of New Ross with his wife and five daughters. He regularly delivers coal to the local convent, where one day he sees a teenage girl being forcibly admitted there. The incident triggers Bill's memories of his difficult childhood as the son of a young single mother, ostracised by her family but permitted to work for Mrs Wilson, a wealthy and independent landowner, along with recollections of Ned, a farmhand on the estate whom Bill later suspects may have been his father.

On his next visit, Bill enters the convent to deliver an invoice and sees girls doing laundry and cleaning floors. One girl approaches him and desperately asks him to help her escape the convent. A nun scolds him for entering the convent unescorted, and he leaves. He returns home and violently scrubs his hands while washing them, recalling his mother's sudden death and his subsequent life with Mrs Wilson. Overcome with emotion, Bill collapses to the bathroom floor. He tells his wife Eileen what happened at the convent, and she urges him not to interfere in the affairs of the laundry, arguing that the girls have nowhere else to go. He replies that he and his mother were fortunate that Mrs Wilson had not shared Eileen's views.

Some time later, Bill sets off early to make a delivery and finds another girl, Sarah, locked in the convent's coal shed in freezing temperatures. She tells him that she is due to give birth in five months. Bill takes her inside and is led to the cosy office of Sister Mary, the convent's mother superior. After being washed and changed, Sarah is brought into the office and, when questioned by Sister Mary, says that the other girls locked her in the shed as part of a game. Her manner suggests that she was locked in the coal shed by a member of the convent as a form of punishment. After Sarah is led away, Sister Mary questions Bill about his family. She implies that if he speaks about what he has seen, his younger daughters may be denied places at the adjacent school run by the nuns. She then gives him a Christmas card containing cash for his wife Eileen. As Bill is led out of the convent, he sees Sarah again, asks for her name, and offers to help her.

Later, after Sister Mary mentions the card to her, Eileen asks Bill about it and finds the envelope in his jacket pocket. Surprised by the cash inside, she asks why he did not give it to her earlier, and he says that he forgot. Bill later visits his mother's grave before going to Ned's house, where the new owner tells him that Ned has moved to a nursing home after contracting pneumonia. Noting Bill's striking resemblance to Ned, she assumes that they are related and asks whether Ned is his uncle. Bill does not reply.

Bill later visits the local pub, whose owner, Mrs Kehoe, advises Bill to toe the line and not speak out about the convent because of the nuns' influence in the community. One evening, Bill goes to buy his wife a Christmas present, and on the way home, sees a jigsaw like one he had earlier told his children he had received as a child. He enters a barber shop and recalls sitting in a similar chair as a boy, pulling faces at Ned. He also remembers a snowball fight with Ned, hugging him warmly, sharing a hot drink with him at Mrs Wilson's house, and watching Ned comfort and kiss his mother. He then recalls Ned holding the body of Bill's mother and abruptly leaves the barber shop.

Bill returns to the convent and finds Sarah locked in the coal shed again. After reassuring the frightened girl, he leads her out of the convent grounds and openly through the town, eventually carrying her to his home. There, he takes her hand and brings her inside to meet his family.

The film closes with a dedication to the 56,000 female victims of the Magdalene laundries, which were in operation from 1922 to 1998, and their children that were taken from them.

== Cast ==
- Cillian Murphy as Bill Furlong, a coal merchant
  - Louis Kirwan as young Bill
- Eileen Walsh as Eileen Furlong, Bill's wife
- Michelle Fairley as Mrs Wilson
- Emily Watson as Sister Mary, the Mother superior of the convent
- Clare Dunne as Sister Carmel
- Peter Claffey as Barry
- Helen Behan as Mrs Kehoe, owner of the local pub
- Liadán Dunlea as Kathleen Furlong, Bill's eldest daughter
- Agnes O'Casey as Sarah Furlong, Bill's mother
- Mark McKenna as Ned, Mrs Wilson's farmhand (credited as "Younger Ned")
- Zara Devlin as Sarah Redmond, a young woman from the convent

== Production ==
During filming of Christopher Nolan's drama Oppenheimer, co-stars Cillian Murphy and Matt Damon struck up a conversation during the shoot, in which Murphy pitched his next project to Damon: an adaptation of Claire Keegan's 2021 novella Small Things like These. Coincidentally, Damon (alongside his longtime friend and business partner Ben Affleck) had recently launched a production company, Artists Equity, and asked Murphy if he would like to join the project to produce, which he was eager to do. It was reported in March 2023 that Murphy, Affleck and Damon would produce the film via Artists Equity, with Damon producing alongside Drew Vinton and Jeff Robinov, and Affleck executive producing with Kevin Halloran and Michael Joe; Murphy produced alongside Alan Moloney via their production company Big Things Films. Ciarán Hinds and Emily Watson were announced to be joining Murphy in the cast. The project was revealed to be directed by Tim Mielants, from a script by Enda Walsh. The film is an Irish production with additional funding coming from Screen Ireland and was co-produced with Wilder Content in Belgium.

The Irish Independent reported in late 2022 and early 2023 that shooting locations for a film of the book were being sought in New Ross, County Wexford. Deadline Hollywood reported in March 2023 that principal photography was under way, with filming in County Wicklow expected to last for four weeks.

== Release ==
The film had its world premiere on 15 February 2024 at the 74th Berlin International Film Festival. In June 2024, Lionsgate acquired distribution rights to the film for North America, the United Kingdom and Ireland, teaming up with Roadside Attractions for the American release. It was released in Ireland and the United Kingdom on 1 November 2024, and the United States a week later on 8 November.

== Reception ==
=== Critical response ===
Small Things like These received positive reviews upon release. On the review aggregator website Rotten Tomatoes, 94% of 123 critics' reviews are positive, with an average rating of 7.7/10. The website's consensus reads: "Cillian Murphy's outstanding acting anchors Small Things Like These, elevating an occasionally enervating historical drama." Metacritic, which uses a weighted average, assigned the film a score of 82 out of 100, based on 28 critics, indicating "universal acclaim".

Ben Croll from TheWrap called the film a "modest gem". Peter Bradshaw from The Guardian gave the film four out of five stars and described it as an "absorbing, committed drama", stating: "I was so rapt, so caught up in this film, that I wasn't aware that it was going to be the ending until the screen faded to black." James Mottram from Radio Times also gave the film four out of five stars and called it an "understated drama that's miniature in scale but not ambition". Tim Robey from The Telegraph described it as "a tight-lipped Irish drama even more suffused with sadness than the log-line implies, and shouldered with hypnotic grace by a very special Cillian Murphy". Guy Lodge from Variety praised Murphy's performance, describing him as the film's "live emotional current" and saying that "Small Things Like These rests on both his quiet and his disquiet as an actor".

Richard Roeper, writing for the Chicago Sun-Times, hailed the film as a masterpiece, and described Murphy's performance as "authentic to the bone, a piece of minimalist acting that avoids any attention-getting mannerisms or flamboyant tics or thundering speechifying." Roeper placed the film at number one on his annual film ranking.

David Rooney from The Hollywood Reporter called it a moving, "somber, unhurried drama" and appreciated Murphy and Watson's performances. Jonathan Romney from Screen Daily highlighted Murphy and Walsh's performances, Mielants's direction and Walsh's writing, which is "largely faithful" to the novel. Rachel Pronger from IndieWire called the film a "subtler, a genuinely profound low-key gem" and appreciated Walsh's writing and Murphy, Watson and Walsh's performances. Stephanie Bunbury from Deadline Hollywood lamented the film's lack of "dramatic tension", but appreciated Watson's performance. Writing for RogerEbert.com, Robert Daniels noted that the film has "a promising premise that loses some steam in the final half hour".

=== Accolades ===
The film received nine nominations at the Irish Film and Television Awards in January 2025.

Award	Date	Category	Recipient	Result	Ref.
Berlin International Film Festival	25 February 2024	Golden Bear	Small Things like These	Nominated	
Berlin International Film Festival	25 February 2024	Best Supporting Performance	Emily Watson	Won	
Camerimage	23 November 2024	Golden Frog for Best Cinematography	Frank van den Eeden	Nominated	
Dublin Film Critics' Circle	19 November 2024	Best Actor	Cillian Murphy	2nd Place	
Dublin Film Critics' Circle	19 November 2024	Best Irish Film	Small Things like These	2nd Place	
21st Irish Film & Television Awards	14 February 2025	Best Film	Small Things like These	Won	
21st Irish Film & Television Awards	14 February 2025	Best Script	Enda Walsh	Won	
21st Irish Film & Television Awards	14 February 2025	Best Lead Actor	Cillian Murphy	Won	
21st Irish Film & Television Awards	14 February 2025	Best Lead Actress	Eileen Walsh	Nominated	
21st Irish Film & Television Awards	14 February 2025	Best Supporting Actress	Zara Devlin	Nominated	
21st Irish Film & Television Awards	14 February 2025	Best International Actress	Emily Watson	Nominated	
21st Irish Film & Television Awards	14 February 2025	Best Casting	Maureen Hughes	Nominated	
21st Irish Film & Television Awards	14 February 2025	Best Hair & Makeup	Lorraine Glynn, Lynn Johnston	Nominated	
21st Irish Film & Television Awards	14 February 2025	Best Sound	Hugh Fox, Senjan Jansen	Nominated	
