= Cleona Ní Chrualaoí =

Irish film producer

- Born: Reading, England
- Education: Dublin City University (BA)
- Occupations: Journalist; producer
- Known for: The Quiet Girl
- Spouse: Colm Bairéad

Cleona Ní Chrualaoí is an Irish film and television producer.

== Career ==
Ní Chrualaoí was born in Reading, England, but moved at age four to County Meath in Ireland, the country of her parents. She graduated from Dublin City University with a bachelor's degree in journalism in 2001. She worked as a reporter and presenter in radio and television before beginning to produce documentaries and other films in the Irish language.

The Quiet Girl (Irish: An Cailín Ciúin), Ní Chrualaoí's first feature film, premiered at the 72nd Berlinale in 2022 and has received critical acclaim. It was nominated for Best International Feature Film at the 95th Academy Awards in the US.

== Personal life ==
Ní Chrualaoi is married to Colm Bairéad, who wrote and directed The Quiet Girl. They have two children.

== Partial filmography ==
=== As producer ===
| Year | Title | Notes |
|---|---|---|
| 2010 | Coiscéimeanna | Television miniseries |
| 2012 | Lorg na gCos: Súil Siar ar Mise Éire | Documentary film |
| 2015 | The Joy | Television miniseries |
| 2022 | An Cailín Ciúin (The Quiet Girl) | Feature film |
