= Claire Keegan =

Irish writer (born 1968)

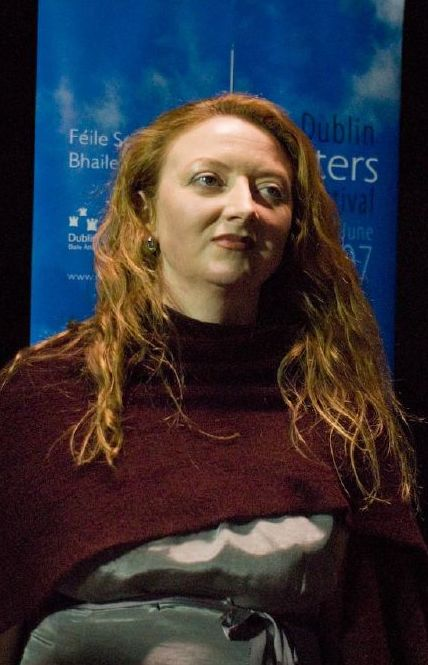
- Keegan at the Dublin Writers Festival in 2007.
- Born: 1968 (age 57–58)
- Occupation: Short story writer
- Writing career
- Notable works: Antarctica; Walk the Blue Fields; Foster; Small Things Like These
- Notable awards: Rooney Prize for Irish Literature (2000); Davy Byrnes Irish Writing Award (2009); Orwell Prize for Political Fiction (2022)
- Website: ckfictionclinic.com

Claire Keegan (born 1968) is an Irish writer known for her short stories, which have been published in The New Yorker, Best American Short Stories, Granta, and The Paris Review. She is also known for her novellas, two of which have been adapted as films.

== Early life and education ==
Claire Keegan was born in 1968, and raised on a farm as one of a large family in County Wicklow, Ireland.

She travelled to New Orleans, Louisiana, United States, when she was 17 and studied English and political science at Loyola University. She returned to Ireland in 1992, working part-time in a library. She later studied for a master's in creative writing at Cardiff University. She subsequently received an M. Phil at Trinity College Dublin.

== Career ==
Keegan's first collection of short stories, Antarctica (1999), won the Rooney Prize for Irish Literature and the William Trevor Prize.

Her second collection of short stories, Walk the Blue Fields, was published in 2007. Keegan's 'long, short story' "Foster" won the 2009 Davy Byrnes Short Story Award. "Foster" appeared in the 15 February 2010 issue of The New Yorker and was included in The Best American Short Stories 2011. It was later published by Faber and Faber in a longer form. "Foster" is now included as a text for the Irish Leaving Certificate. It was adapted for film by writer/director Colm Bairéad as An Cailín Ciúin (The Quiet Girl; 2022), and was nominated in 2023 for the Academy Award for Best International Feature Film.

In late 2021, Keegan published a novella, Small Things Like These, set in Ireland in the mid-1980s. It was shortlisted for the 2022 Booker Prize. The film adaptation, starring Cillian Murphy, Emily Watson, and Eileen Walsh, had its world premiere at the 74th Berlin International Film Festival on 15 February 2024. In 2024, Oprah Winfrey selected the novel as the 109th choice in her Book Club.

In February 2022 the story So Late in the Day was published in The New Yorker, and was released in a hardback edition in 2023 by Faber.

== Awards and honours ==
Keegan has won the inaugural William Trevor Prize, the Rooney Prize for Irish Literature, the Olive Cook Award and the Davy Byrnes Irish Writing Award 2009. Other awards include the Hugh Leonard Bursary, the Macaulay Fellowship, the Martin Healy Prize, the Kilkenny Prize, and the Tom Gallon Award. She was also a 2002 Wingate Scholar and a two-time recipient of the Francis MacManus Award. She was a visiting professor at Villanova University in 2008. Keegan was the Ireland Fund Artist-in-Residence in the Celtic Studies Department of St. Michael's College at the University of Toronto in March 2009. In 2019, she was appointed as Writing Fellow at Trinity College Dublin. Pembroke College Cambridge and Trinity College Dublin selected Keegan as the 2021 Briena Staunton Visiting Fellow.

The French translation of Small Things Like These (Ce genre de petites choses) has been shortlisted for two prestigious awards: the Francophonie Ambassadors' Literary Award and the Grand Prix de L'Heroine Madame Figaro. In March 2021, Keegan and her French translator, Jacqueline Odin, won the Francophonie Ambassadors' Literary Award. Small Things Like These won the 2022 Orwell Prize for Political Fiction. It became the shortest book to be shortlisted for the Booker Prize at the ceremony in 2022. It was also shortlisted for the Rathbones Folio Prize.

In 2023 Keegan was named "Author of the Year" in conjunction with the Irish Book Awards. Her book So Late in the Day was also shortlisted for the Irish "Novel of the Year" award.

Keegan has been a member of Aosdána since 2008.

== Works ==
=== Novella ===
- 2021 – Small Things Like These

=== Short story collections ===
- 1999 – Antarctica. Faber and Faber, London. ISBN 978-0-571-19712-5.
- 2007 – Walk the Blue Fields. Faber and Faber, London. ISBN 978-0-571-23306-9.
- 2019 – The Forester's Daughter. Faber and Faber, London. ISBN 978-0-571-35185-5.
- 2023 – So Late in the Day: Stories of Women and Men. Grove Press, New York. ISBN 978-0-8021-6085-0.

=== Short stories ===
- 1998 – "The Singing Cashier". Published in The Paris Review
- 2004 — "Close to the Water’s Edge". Published in Birthday Stories: Selected and Introduced by Haruki Murakami. ISBN 978-1-843-43159-6.
- 2006 – "Safe". Published by Granta in October 2006.
- 2010 – "Foster". Faber and Faber, London. ISBN 978-0-571-25565-8. (First published in The New Yorker, February 15, 2010)
- 2010 — "Men and Women". Published in The Granta Book of the Irish Short Story. ISBN 978-1-847-08097-4.
- 2022 – "So Late in the Day". Published in The New Yorker, 21 February 2022.
