= The Right Juice =

2014 Portuguese comedy-drama film

- Film poster
- Directed by: Kristjan Knigge
- Screenplay by: David Butler-Cole; Kristjan Knigge
- Produced by: BJ Boulter
- Starring: Mark Killeen; Lúcia Moniz; Miguel Damião; Ellie Chidzey; Beau McClellan
- Cinematography: Dick Merx
- Release date: September 18, 2014 (Portugal)
- Language: English

The Right Juice is an English-language comedy-drama film produced in Algarve, Portugal. Directed by Kristjan Knigge, the original screenplay has been written by David Butler-Cole and Kristjan Knigge. Produced by Barbara Jane Boulter and Co-Produced by Chris Parker, the film is starring Mark Killeen, Lúcia Moniz, Miguel Damião, Ellie Chidzey, and Beau McClellan. The film is about a, failed, bankrupt and fresh from the city, who is pursuing fulfillment by growing oranges on an old farm. He and his neighbour face unprincipled enemies in a highly amusing quest to save their valley from exploitation.

== Plot ==
Oliver, failed, bankrupt and fresh from the city, is again pursuing his financial ambitions by attempting to grow oranges on an old farm. His wife Sally despairs of the appalling facilities. When Oliver discovers the land is barren for reasons that are more sinister than appear at first glance, he and his neighbour Manel face unprincipled enemies in a highly amusing quest to save the valley from exploitation. In their battle, they are joined by the lovely Nesta, her beauty a foil for both Oliver and his enemies.

== Cast and characters ==
- Mark Killeen as Oliver Fellows
- Lúcia Moniz as Nesta
- Miguel Damião as Manel António Coelho dos Santos Guerreiro
- Ellie Chidzey as Sally Fellows
- Beau McClellan as Andreus Dranius

== Production ==
Principal photography for the production was completed in Southern Portugal in April and early May 2012. In addition to crowd funding and loan financing, The Right Juice has been supported by various sponsors, such as Holiday Inn, Intermarche, Vila Vita, LeasePlan and many other local businesses. The project has been actively supported by the Algarve Tourism Board and the Algarve Film Commission.

== Filming locations ==
- Algarve, Portugal
- Estombar, Portugal
- Zoomarine
