= Paul Ronan =

British-born Irish actor (born 1965)

- Born: Paul Anthony Ronan; 21 March 1965 (age 61); Manchester, England
- Occupation: Actor
- Years active: 1996–present
- Spouse: Monica Brennan (m. 1992; div. 2025)
- Children: Saoirse Ronan

Paul Anthony Ronan (born 21 March 1965) is a British-born Irish actor.

== Early life ==
Paul Anthony Ronan was born on 21 March 1965 in Manchester, son of Thomas "Tommy" Ronan and Una Carson.

== Career ==
In 1995, Ronan's acting career started, and he has been a regular performer in TV and films since the mid-1990s, notably as Edso Dowling in the Ballykissangel TV series; other TV appearances include Rebel Heart and The Tudors.

== Personal life ==
In 1992, Ronan married Monica Brennan. The couple divorced in June 2025.

They have one daughter, Saoirse Ronan, who has been acting professionally since 2003.

== Filmography ==
=== Film ===
Year	Title	Role	Notes
1996	Faithful	Young guy in car	
1997	The Devil's Own	Sean Phelan	
1997	A Further Gesture	Liam	
1997	The Boxer	Eddie Carroll's cornerman	
1999	Shergar	Lynch	
1999	Exiled	Brendan	
2000	Ordinary Decent Criminal	Billy Lynch	
2000	When the Sky Falls	Mangan	
2001	Do Armed Robbers Have Love Affairs?	Price	Short film
2002	The Escapist	Officer	
2003	Bloom	Lenehan	
2003	Veronica Guerin	Jimmy Guerin	
2005	It Happened One Night	Tom	Short film
2007	Speed Dating	Dan Moran	
2007	Poker Nights	Jeff	Short film
2009	One Hundred Mornings	Sgt. Lavelle	
2009	Nothing Personal	Man in car	
2013	Life's a Breeze	Supervisor	
2013	How I Live Now	Chasing man	
2014	Poison Pen	Darcy	
2015	Fading Away	Street sweep	
2015	1916, Souls of Freedom	Paul Ronan	Short film; also associate producer
2016	Twice Shy	George O'Meara	
2016	Lily	Dermot	Short film
2016	Don't Listen	Martin	
2017	Saving Santa	Barry Fair	Short film
2017	Family Business	Liam	Short film
2018	This Day	Dimples	
2019	Never Grow Old	Bill Crabtree	
2021	Who We Love	Dermot	

=== Television ===
Year	Title	Role	Notes
1995	Performance	Tommy Owen	Episode: "Shadow of a Gunman"
1998	New York Undercover	Ethan McManus	Episode: "The Troubles"
1999	A Rose for Annie	Tom Mullaney	Television film
1999	DDU	James Kelly	2 episodes
2001	Rebel Heart	Liam Lynch	Television miniseries (3 episodes)
2001	Ballykissangel	Edso Dowling	8 episodes
2003	The Clinic	Agitated man	1 episode
2005	Showbands	Micko	Television film
2009	The Tudors	Duke William of Cleves	2 episodes
2014	Love/Hate	Brendan	3 episodes
2015	JFK.The Badge Man Conspiracy	Thomas	Television film
2018	Striking Out	Dermot Doyle	
2018-2024 2025-	Fair City	Anto Collins	
