= Fools of Fortune =

1990 film by Pat O'Connor

- Directed by: Pat O'Connor
- Screenplay by: Michael Hirst
- Based on: Fools of Fortune by William Trevor
- Produced by: Sarah Radclyffe
- Starring: Mary Elizabeth Mastrantonio; Iain Glen; Julie Christie
- Cinematography: Jerzy Zielinski
- Edited by: Michael Bradsell
- Music by: Hans Zimmer
- Production companies: Channel Four Films; PolyGram; Working Title Films
- Distributed by: Palace Pictures
- Release date: 22 June 1990
- Running time: 109 minutes
- Country: United Kingdom
- Language: English
- Budget: £2.5 million
- Box office: US$83,490

Fools of Fortune is a 1990 Irish romantic drama film directed by Pat O'Connor and written by Michael Hirst based on the 1983 novel by Irish writer William Trevor. It depicts a Protestant family caught up in the conflict between the British Army and the IRA during the Irish War of Independence.

== Cast ==
- Iain Glen as Willie Quinton
- Sean T. McClory as young Willie
- Mary Elizabeth Mastrantonio as Marianne
- Julie Christie as Mrs. Quinton
- Catherine McFadden as Imelda
- Amy-Joyce Hastings (credited as Amy Hastings) as Geraldine Quinton
- Michael Kitchen as Mr. Quinton
- Hazel Flanagan as Deirdre Quinton
- Frankie McCafferty as Tim Paddy
- Niamh Cusack as Josephine
- John Kavanagh as Johnny Lacy

== Production ==
It was filmed on location in Dublin, County Westmeath, Galway and at Ardmore Studios.

O'Connor recruited twice Oscar-nominated designer Judy Moorcroft to provide costumes for the film.

== Release ==
The film went to VHS and Laserdisc, but has not yet appeared on DVD.

New York Times reviewer Vincent Canby described the film as "an ambitious mess, of interest only because of the chance to see [Julie] Christie, who becomes more and more tautly beautiful with the years, and [Mary Elizabeth] Mastrantonio, who is also beautiful and does an extremely credible upper-class English accent." The Washington Post described it as "a passionate, mystifyingly awkward bit of filmmaking".
