= Small Things like These =

2021 novel by Claire Keegan

- Author: Claire Keegan
- Language: English
- Genre: Historical fiction
- Set in: 1980s Ireland
- Publisher: Faber and Faber
- Publication date: 21 October 2021
- Media type: Print
- Pages: 128
- Awards: Orwell Prize
- ISBN: 9780802158741 Hardcover edition
- OCLC: 1271995923

Small Things like These is a historical fiction novella by Claire Keegan, published on 21 October 2021 by Faber and Faber. In 2022, the book won the Orwell Prize for Political Fiction, and was shortlisted for the Rathbones Folio Prize and the Booker Prize. It was adapted into a film of the same name starring Cillian Murphy.

== Synopsis ==
Bill Furlong is a coal and fuel merchant in New Ross, Ireland, in December 1985. When he was born, his mother was an unmarried teenager, ostracised by her family but permitted to continue working respectably as a maid by her kind-hearted employer, Mrs. Wilson. Now a hardworking family man, Bill prepares for the approaching Christmas with his wife and five daughters.

While delivering coal to the local convent, he begins to suspect that their supposed training school for girls is, in fact, a cruelly abusive Magdalene laundry. First, he finds a group of deprived-looking young women polishing the floors, one of whom asks for his help getting out to a river to drown herself. On his next delivery, he finds a girl named Sarah locked in an outbuilding, who has been out in the cold all night. When he lets her out, she asks him to find out about her baby, but the Mother Superior interrupts them. She tells Bill that Sarah has a mental illness and has ended up outside by mistake, and distracts Bill with tea and his Christmas tip.

Bill attempts to ignore the disturbing events at the convent, as his wife suggests. Feeling restless, he decides to visit Ned, the farmhand at the old Wilson home with whom he had been close as a child. The new owner of the property tells Bill that Ned has been hospitalized and no longer lives there. She casually remarks that Bill greatly resembles Ned; and Bill begins to suspect that Ned is his father. Later, the local pub owner warns Bill not to publicly criticise the convent since the church is involved in all parts of town life.

He returns to the convent, where he finds Sarah again locked in the cold. He gives her his coat and walks with her back to his own house, attracting attention from the locals they pass. He reaches his front door, fearful but optimistic that doing the right thing will work out.

== Reception ==
Small Things like These was generally well received by critics and received starred reviews from Kirkus Reviews and Library Journal.

Multiple reviewers commented on the moral storytelling, which comes across as "a sort of anti-Christmas Carol." Kirkus called the book "[a] stunning feat of storytelling and moral clarity." The Herald said the book "assures us we are all capable of doing the right thing, and that goodness, like misery, can be handed on from man to man."

This depth of the book surprised some reviewers, given that Small Things like These is a quick read that could be considered a novella given its length. Associated Press noted, "Keegan's economy of prose is a marvel ... The book takes just an hour or so to read, but you still feel like you know Bill Furlong by the end and understand why he does what he does. His tale of quiet heroism doesn't require any more words." A similar sentiment was echoed in the Los Angeles Times, who wrote, "Keegan, whose short stories contain unusual depth and grandeur, is the only contemporary writer who could manage the feat of a completely imagined, structured and sustained world with such brevity."

Reviewers also highlighted Keegan's writing style. Keegan's prose was referred to as "surprisingly powerful," "languid and crystalline" in Booklist, as well as "quiet and precise, jewel-like in its clarity" in Library Journal. Further, the Financial Times noted, "Keegan has a keen ear for dialect without letting it overwhelm conversations," and Damon Galgut wrote in The Times Literary Supplement: "Keegan knows how to weigh and pace her sentences, and her fine judgement delivers many subtle pleasures ... [she] fully exploits the power of understatement."

Lamorna Ash, writing in The Guardian, noted that Small Things like These does "not feel quite as devastating, as lasting, as Keegan’s previous work[.] Perhaps, for the first time in her writing, the lightness here has become too light – is kept too far away from the darkness that lurks at the other side of the town."

Awards and honors for Small Things like These
Year	Award	Result	Ref.
2022	Booker Prize	Shortlisted	
2022	Orwell Prize for Political Fiction	Won	
2022	Rathbones Folio Prize	Shortlisted	

== Adaptations ==
The Irish Independent reported in February 2023 that shooting locations for the book's film adaptation were being sought. Actor Cillian Murphy stars in the film, with the screenplay written by Murphy's long-time collaborator Enda Walsh. In January 2024, it was confirmed that Small Things Like These would be opening the 2024 Berlin International Film Festival on 15 February. It was released in the UK and Ireland on 1 November 2024, and in the United States on 8 November.

=== Translations ===
- Brazilian Portuguese: Pequenas Coisas como Estas. Translated by Adriana Lisboa. Belo Horizonte: Relicário. ISBN 978-6-58-988991-5.
- Czech: Takové maličkosti. Translated by Hana Ulmanová. Prague: Prostor. 2023. ISBN 978-8-07260-558-3.
- German: Kleine Dinge wie diese. Translated by Hans-Christian Oeser. Göttingen: Steidl Verlag. 2022. ISBN 978-3-96999-065-0.
- Italian: Piccole cose da nulla. Translated by Monica Pareschi. Milan: Einaudi. 2022. ISBN 978-8806251635.
- Portuguese: Pequenas Coisas como Estas. Translated by Inês Dias. Lisbon: Relógio D'Água. 2022. ISBN 978-9-89-783286-4.
