= The January Man =

1989 film by Pat O'Connor

- Theatrical poster
- Directed by: Pat O'Connor
- Written by: John Patrick Shanley
- Produced by: Norman Jewison; Ezra Swerdlow
- Starring: Kevin Kline; Susan Sarandon; Mary Elizabeth Mastrantonio; Harvey Keitel; Danny Aiello; Rod Steiger
- Cinematography: Jerzy Zieliński
- Edited by: Lou Lombardo
- Music by: Marvin Hamlisch
- Production company: Star Partners II Ltd.
- Distributed by: Metro-Goldwyn-Mayer
- Release date: January 13, 1989 (U.S.)
- Running time: 97 minutes
- Country: United States
- Language: English
- Box office: $4.6 million (USA)

The January Man is a 1989 American neo-noir comedy thriller film directed by Pat O'Connor from a screenplay by John Patrick Shanley. The film stars Kevin Kline as Nick Starkey, a smart ex-NYPD detective who is lured back into service by his police commissioner brother (Harvey Keitel) when a serial killer terrorizes the city. Nick becomes involved with the mayor's daughter (Mary Elizabeth Mastrantonio) and is aided in his investigation by his neighbor, Ed, an artist (Alan Rickman)

This movie received negative reviews from critics.

== Plot ==
On New Year's Eve, Manhattan socialite Alison Hawkins returns home from the evening's festivities. As she feeds her fish before going to bed, a killer uses a blue ribbon to strangle her to death. It is the latest murder by a serial killer who has been terrorizing the city for eleven months.

The mayor, frustrated with the lack of progress in the case, tells NYPD commissioner Frank Starkey to bring in his brother, former detective Nick Starkey. This is a controversial decision, as Nick left the force in disgrace two years earlier but may be the only police officer brilliant enough to capture the killer.

Frank talks Nick into returning, but only on the condition that he be able to cook dinner the next night for Frank's wife, Christine, who is Nick's ex-girlfriend. After a press conference announcing Nick's reinstatement, Christine and Nick have dinner. Old wounds are opened, including mention of a canceled check which indicated that Frank was involved in the scandal that got Nick fired.

After reporting for work, Nick takes a different office than the one he was assigned because the light was not to the liking of his friend Ed, a painter. After getting Captain Alcoa to add Ed to the payroll as his assistant, Nick begins work on the case. His first lead is to speak to the mayor's daughter, Bernadette, who was a friend of Alison. After Nick and Bernadette visit Alison's apartment, he decides to let her stay at his apartment because she is too frightened to return to her own.

Nick realizes that the previous murders occurred on dates that are prime numbers, all of which are among the twelve prime numbers possible up to the number 31. Because 5 is the only one of the prime numbers that has not been used, Nick deduces that the next murder will take place the following night, on the fifth of the month. However, Nick is seemingly proven wrong when a woman is strangled one day ahead of Nick's prediction, after which the killer leaps out the window to his death. Nick believes that this is a copycat killing, especially when he learns that the man broke a window, as opposed to picking a lock to gain entrance as in the other murders. Frank and the mayor consider the case closed and are content to be done with Nick.

Nick and Ed discover the position of the victims' buildings, when seen on a map of Manhattan, forms the constellation Virgo. They also realize that all the rooms in which the murders took place have windows on the front of the building, and that when the exterior positions of the windows are lined up together according to which floor they are on, they correlate to eleven notes in the chorus of the song "Calendar Girl". This enables them to identify where the killer will next strike.

Nick sets a trap with Bernadette as bait, outfitting her with a neck guard to prevent the killer from strangling her. The trio stakes out the room in a supply closet and witness the killer picking the lock to get into the apartment. They intercept the apartment's resident and send Bernadette in, where she is attacked. Nick breaks in and, after a prolonged struggle with the killer, subdues him. He then wraps up the suspect in a carpet and delivers him to the police.

Christine arrives and tells Nick she's broken up with Frank and hopes to reconcile. He rejects her in favor of a relationship with Bernadette.

== Cast ==
- Kevin Kline as Lt. Nick Starkey
- Susan Sarandon as Christine Starkey
- Mary Elizabeth Mastrantonio as Bernadette Flynn
- Harvey Keitel as Commissioner Frank Starkey
- Danny Aiello as Capt. Vincent Alcoa
- Rod Steiger as Mayor Eamon Flynn
- Alan Rickman as Ed
- Faye Grant as Alison Hawkins
- Kenneth Welsh as Roger Culver
- Bruce MacVittie as Rip
- Bill Cobbs as Detective Reilly
- Gerard Parkes as Reverend Drew
- Malachy McCourt as Hob
- Colin Mochrie as Pat

== Reception ==
The movie received negative reviews from critics. Roger Ebert, of the Chicago Sun-Times, wrote: "The January Man is worth study as a film that fails to find its tone. It's all over the map. It wants to be zany but violent, satirical but slapstick, romantic but cynical. It wants some of its actors to rant and rave like amateur tragedians, and others to reach for subtle nuances. And it wants all of these things to happen at the same time." Rita Kempley of The Washington Post was even more harsh, writing, "Eliot called April the cruelest month, but then he hadn't seen The January Man. Billed as a mystery with romance and comedy, it is a damp sock of a movie that makes you wish for a leap year." It holds a 28% rating on Rotten Tomatoes from 18 reviews. Metacritic, which uses a weighted average, assigned the film a score of 33 out of 100, based on 15 critics, indicating "generally unfavorable" reviews.

The film's box-office gross in the United States and Canada was $4,611,062. The film's 1989 US video release generated a further $7 million.
