= Catherine Clinch =

Irish actress (born 2010)

- Born: 2009 or 2010 (age 15–16); Ranelagh, Dublin, Ireland
- Occupation: Actress
- Known for: The Quiet Girl
- Mother: Méav Ní Mhaolchatha

Catherine Clinch (born 2009 or 2010) is an Irish child actress. She made her film debut in The Quiet Girl (2022).

== Life and career ==
Clinch grew up in the village of Ranelagh in Dublin. Her father, Tom Clinch, is a stockbroker, and her mother is the singer Méav Ní Mhaolchatha. She took acting classes from a young age.

Clinch first appeared on screen in Colm Bairéad's The Quiet Girl (An Cailín Ciúin) as Cáit, a reserved 9-year-old who spends the summer of 1981 on a distant relative's farm. Auditions were sought for a lead actress who could speak Irish, the language of most of the film, and the role at Irish-language schools during the COVID-19 pandemic. The film's producers recalled deciding quickly that Clinch was right for the role—able to carry the film—when they saw her audition tape. Shot in 2020 and released in 2022, the film was critically acclaimed alongside praise in particular for Clinch's performance. She was commended for conveying "a deep reservoir of emotions" while showing studious restraint. She was awarded Best Actress in a Leading Role for The Quiet Girl at the 18th IFTAs.
