= Pat O'Connor (director) =

Irish film director (born 1943)

- Born: Patrick O’Connor; 3 October 1943 (age 83); Ardmore, County Waterford, Ireland
- Occupation: Film director
- Spouse: Mary Elizabeth Mastrantonio (m. 1990)
- Children: 2

Patrick O'Connor (born 3 October 1943 in Ardmore, County Waterford, Ireland) is a BAFTA-winning Irish film director.

== Career ==
In 1982, O'Connor won a Jacob's Award for his direction of the RTÉ TV adaptation of William Trevor's short story Ballroom of Romance, starring Cyril Cusack and Brenda Fricker. It was shot near the village of Ballycroy, County Mayo. He subsequently won the BAFTA award for Best Television Single Drama, 1983 for the same work. He also directed Trevor's One of Ourselves for BBC TV, again starring Cyril Cusack, and filmed in Cappoquin and Lismore, County Waterford.

O'Connor has been married since 1990 to Oscar-nominated actress Mary Elizabeth Mastrantonio, with whom he has two sons. He directed Mastrantonio in Fools of Fortune, another William Trevor film adaptation, and The January Man.

== Filmography ==
- Cal (1984)
- The Ballroom of Romance (filmed in 1982; released in 1986)
- A Month in the Country (1987)
- Stars and Bars (1988)
- The January Man (1989)
- Fools of Fortune (1990)
- Zelda (1993)
- Circle of Friends (1995)
- Inventing the Abbotts (1997)
- Dancing at Lughnasa (1998)
- Sweet November (2001)
- Private Peaceful (2012)
