= Walk the Blue Fields =

- Directed by: John Crowley
- Screenplay by: Conor McPherson
- Based on: Walk the Blue Fields by Claire Keegan
- Produced by: Denis O'Sullivan; Jeff Kalligheri; Emily Blunt; Ed Guiney; Andrew Lowe
- Starring: Emily Blunt; Andrew Scott; Tom Cullen; Ciarán Hinds
- Production companies: Compelling Pictures; Element Pictures; Ledbury Productions
- Distributed by: Netflix
- Countries: United States; United Kingdom; Ireland
- Language: English

Walk the Blue Fields is an upcoming romantic drama film directed by John Crowley from a screenplay by Conor McPherson. It is based on the 2007 book by Claire Keegan. It stars Emily Blunt, Andrew Scott, Tom Cullen, and Ciarán Hinds.

== Cast ==
- Emily Blunt as Margaret Flusk
- Andrew Scott as Stark
- Tom Cullen
- Ciarán Hinds

== Production ==
In September 2025, it was reported that an adaptation of Claire Keegan's 2007 book Walk the Blue Fields was in development, with John Crowley directing, Conor McPherson writing the screenplay, and Emily Blunt starring and producing.

Principal photography began on February 23, 2026, in Dublin and Wicklow, and it is expected to wrap on April 15. Filming also occurred in Kildare. Andrew Scott, Tom Cullen, and Ciarán Hinds joined the cast, with Netflix acquiring the distribution rights.
