= The Callback Queen =

2013 film by Graham Cantwell

- She's Hollywood's next big thing. He's Hollywood.
- Directed by: Graham Cantwell
- Written by: Graham Cantwell
- Starring: Amy-Joyce Hastings; Mark Killeen; Seán T. O'Meallaigh; Ger Ryan; Vicki Michelle; Eoin Macken
- Cinematography: Anthony Bowes
- Music by: Joseph Conlan
- Release date: 10 July 2013
- Running time: 88 minutes
- Country: United Kingdom
- Language: English

The Callback Queen is a 2013 British romantic comedy independent film by Irish director Graham Cantwell, starring a largely British and Irish cast: Amy-Joyce Hastings, Mark Killeen, Seán T. O'Meallaigh, Ger Ryan, Vicki Michelle and Eoin Macken.

== Plot ==
Kate Loughlin is a vivacious young actress struggling to get her big break in the London film industry. When she lands an audition for the lead role in a massive movie franchise based on the 'Prince of Chaos' novels by legendary author Horatio King, she goes after the opportunity with all guns blazing.

However a sleazy agent trying to pimp her to the director Vincent Catalano, pushes her to the other extreme. Determined to prove her strict professionalism, she starts second guessing Vincent's interest in her.

Dáithí Carroll is an earnest young filmmaker studying in London. Chosen to direct one of his college's graduation films, he needs a crew. Enter Joanne Webber, a hard-nosed Londoner with a penchant for role-play and her eye on this vulnerable Irishman. Together they recruit a motley crew for their film, and Dáithí enlists Kate to star.

A restless Vincent inserts himself onto their set through his friend and casting director Deborah Whitton, who is tutor to the young filmmakers. Kate's resolve to maintain her integrity is put to the test as she finds herself drawn to Vincent when they are repeatedly thrown together.

Add to the mix rival starlet Luci, a wannabe WAG with designs on both Kate's coveted role in 'Prince of Chaos', and on Vincent! In the cut-throat arena of show-business, Kate stands to learn that her profession is personal, and sometimes friction can create a spark.

== Cast ==
- Amy-Joyce Hastings - Kate Loughlin
- Mark Killeen - Vincent Catalano
- Seán T. O'Meallaigh - Daithí Carroll
- Kate Braithwaite - Joanne Webber
- Vicki Michelle - Deborah Whitton
- Ger Ryan - Mary Carroll
- Maximilian Befort - Guido
- Sophie Berenice Scott - Luci Wilkinson
- Greg Kolpakchi - Nikolas
- Caroline Ford - Maxine
- Ben Wigzell - Peter Towne
- Morgan Deare - Horatio King
- Eoin Macken - Prince Cal
- Damar Martin - Barry
- Jay Sutherland - Gerry
- Sean Cronin as 'Arry
- Anna Nightingale as April

== Production ==
The film was shot on location in London in the boroughs of Richmond Upon Thames, Camden and Central London at the British Film Institute, as well as the "Prince of Chaos" sequences which were filmed on location in Snowdonia in Wales.

The "Prince of Chaos" film within a film, was loosely inspired by the HBO Game of Thrones television series, and indeed the author character of Horatio King featured within "The Callback Queen" was based on George R. R. Martin, creator of A Song of Ice and Fire, as explained in Martin's livejournal blog.

The soundtrack includes "London" by 21 Demands (a former incarnation of Kodaline), three tracks by award-winning Irish band The Fallen Drakes, and "Gold" by The Minutes.

The original score was composed by twice Emmy nominated composer Joseph Conlan.

== Release ==
The Callback Queen premiered at the 25th Galway Film Fleadh in Ireland on 10 July 2013, cited as one of the "Fleadh Picks".

It went on to screen twice in Luxembourg's Cine Utopia as part of the British and Irish Film Season held there.

It received its US Premiere on 7 February 2014, at George R. R. Martin's Jean Cocteau Cinema in Santa Fe, New Mexico, where he hosted a post screening interview with actress Amy-Joyce Hastings. It had a six screening run at this venue in the run up to Valentine's Day 2014. Jonathan Richards writing for the Santa Fe New Mexican described the film as being "smart and appealing" and "as cute and endearing and clumsy as a puppy rescued from the pound" with "plenty of sharpness and wit on display". But Donald Clarke of The Irish Times, in a one-star review, argued that "Space precludes comprehensive adumbration of the bum notes sounding throughout this witless cacophony."

On 28 March 2014, the film received its Italian Premiere as part of the 7th Irish Film Festa at Casa Del Cinema in Rome, Italy.
