= Mary Elizabeth Mastrantonio =

American actress (born 1958)

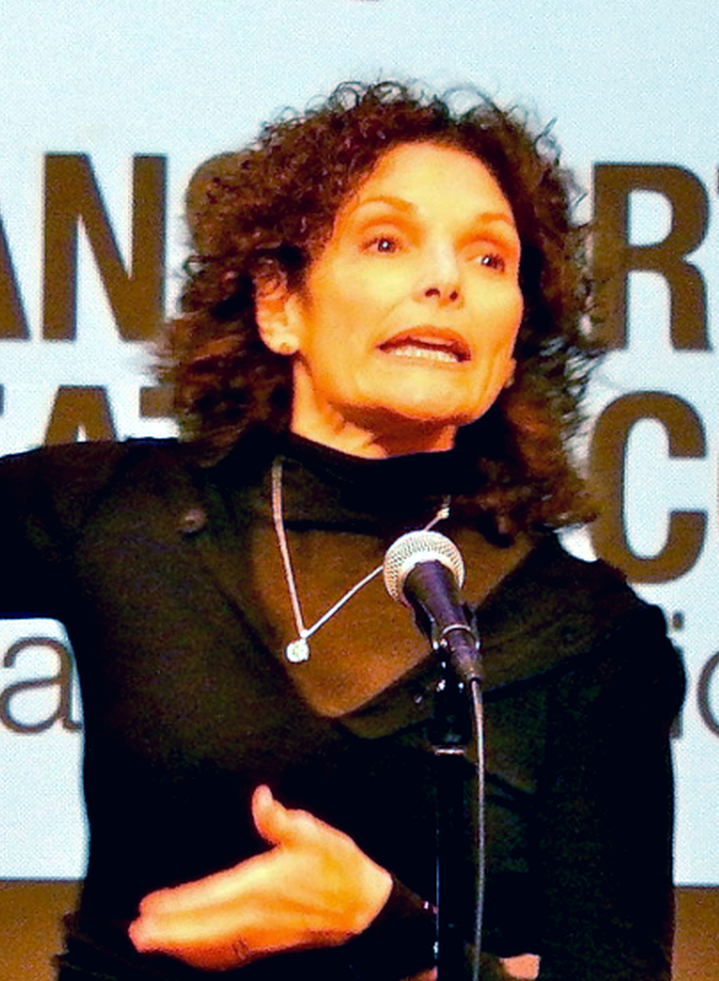
- Mastrantonio in 2013
- Born: November 17, 1958 (age 67); Lombard, Illinois, U.S.
- Education: University of Illinois
- Occupation: Actress
- Years active: 1980–present
- Spouse: Pat O'Connor (m. 1990)
- Children: 2

Mary Elizabeth Mastrantonio (born November 17, 1958) is an American actress and singer. She made her Broadway debut as an understudy in the 1980 revival of West Side Story, and went on to appear in the 1983 film Scarface as Al Pacino's character's sister, Gina Montana, which proved to be her breakout role. For her role as Carmen in the 1986 film The Color of Money, she was nominated for the Academy Award for Best Supporting Actress. Her other film roles include The Abyss (1989), Robin Hood: Prince of Thieves (1991), and The Perfect Storm (2000). In 2003, she was nominated for the Tony Award for Best Actress in a Musical for the Broadway revival of Man of La Mancha.

== Early life ==
Mastrantonio was born in the DuPage County suburb of Lombard, Illinois, to Frank A. Mastrantonio and Mary Dominica (née Pagone), both of Italian descent. Her father operated a bronze foundry. She was raised in Oak Park, Illinois, and studied drama at the University of Illinois. She worked summers at the Opryland USA theme park to earn money for college.

== Career ==
=== Film ===
Mastrantonio first appeared on screen in Brian De Palma's Scarface (1983) as Gina, sister of Al Pacino's Tony Montana. She achieved prominence for her Oscar and Golden Globe-nominated role in The Color of Money (1986) opposite Paul Newman and Tom Cruise.

Her other featured roles include Slam Dance (1987), with Tom Hulce, and The January Man (1989) with Kevin Kline. She also starred in writer/director James Cameron's science fiction The Abyss (1989) with Ed Harris. She played Maid Marian in the film Robin Hood: Prince of Thieves (1991) with Kevin Costner. She played the attorney daughter of Gene Hackman's character in Class Action, co-starred in the 1992 thriller Consenting Adults, and in the same year starred in the thriller White Sands alongside Willem Dafoe and Mickey Rourke, and played a fishing boat captain in The Perfect Storm (2000).

=== Stage ===
Mastrantonio has appeared on Broadway in various musicals, including as an understudy later in the 1980 run of West Side Story, Copperfield, The Human Comedy, and the 2002 revival of Man of La Mancha, where she played Aldonza/Dulcinea opposite Brian Stokes Mitchell. She has appeared in New York Shakespeare Festival productions of Henry V, Measure for Measure, and Twelfth Night. Her New York City stage performances brought her a Tony Award nomination and two Drama Desk Award nominations.

She also starred in Grand Hotel at the Donmar Warehouse in London's West End. In 1984, she was featured in a benefit performance of A Christmas Carol with Helen Hayes, Raul Julia, Harold Scott, F. MacIntyre Dixon, and Len Cariou at the Symphony Space in New York. In 2008, she starred in A View from the Bridge as Beatrice, with Ken Stott and Allan Corduner at the Duke of York's Theatre, London. On stage, she most recently starred in Ghosts as Helena Alving at the Seattle Repertory Theater.

== Personal life ==
Since 1990, Mastrantonio has been married to director Pat O'Connor, who directed The January Man; they have two sons. She and her family lived in England for twenty years before moving back to the United States in the 2010s.

== Acting credits ==
=== Film ===
Year	Title	Role	Notes
1982	The King of Comedy	Extra in crowd scene	Uncredited
1983	Scarface	Gina Montana	
1986	The Color of Money	Carmen	Nominated – Academy Award for Best Supporting Actress; Nominated – Golden Globe Award for Best Supporting Actress – Motion Picture; Nominated – New York Film Critics Circle Award for Best Supporting Actress
1987	Slam Dance	Helen Drood	
1989	The January Man	Bernadette Flynn	
1989	The Abyss	Lindsey Brigman	Nominated – Saturn Award for Best Actress
1990	Fools of Fortune	Marianne	
1991	Class Action	Maggie Ward	
1991	Robin Hood: Prince of Thieves	Maid Marian	Nominated – MTV Movie Award for Best Female Performance; Nominated – Saturn Award for Best Supporting Actress
1992	White Sands	Lane Bodin	
1992	Consenting Adults	Priscilla Parker	
1995	Three Wishes	Jeanne Holman	
1995	Two Bits	Luisa Spirito	
1999	Limbo	Donna De Angelo	Nominated – Las Vegas Film Critics Society Award for Best Actress
1999	My Life So Far	Moira "Mumsie" Pettigrew	
2000	The Perfect Storm	Linda Greenlaw	
2003	Standing Room Only	Maria	Short film, later included in the compilation film Stories of Lost Souls
2015	Amok	Dorothy	

=== Television ===
Year	Title	Role	Notes
1985	Mussolini: The Untold Story	Edda Mussolini-Ciano	Miniseries
1991	Uncle Vanya	Yelena	Television film
1995	Frasier	Eileen (voice)	Episode: "Martin Does It His Way"
1999	Witness Protection	Cindy Batton	Television film
2004	The Brooke Ellison Story	Jean Ellison	Television film, Gracie Allen Award for Outstanding Female Lead in a Drama Special
2005–2006	Without a Trace	Anne Cassidy	Recurring role
2008	Hallmark Hall of Fame	Gayle Russell	Anthology series, Film: "The Russell Girl"
2010	Law & Order: Criminal Intent	Capt. Zoe Callas	Main role
2012–2017	Grimm	Kelly Burkhardt	Recurring role
2013	Blue Bloods	Sophia Lanza	Episode: "Inside Job"
2013	Hostages	First Lady Mary Kincaid	Recurring role
2015–2016	Limitless	Nasreen 'Naz' Pouran	Main role
2017–2019	The Punisher	Marion James	Recurring role
2018–2020	Blindspot	Madeline Burke	Recurring role; season 4, Main role, season 5
2025	Law & Order: Organized Crime	Isabella Spezzano	3 episodes

=== Theater ===
Year	Title	Role	Theatre
1980	West Side Story	Maria	Minskoff Theatre
1980–1983	Amadeus	Katherina Cavalieri / Citizen of Vienna / Constanze Weber	Broadhurst Theatre
1981	Copperfield	Dora Spenlow	ANTA Playhouse
1983	Sunday in the Park with George	Celeste No. 2 / Linda Cash	Playwrights Horizons
1983–1984	The Human Comedy	Bess Macauley	Anspacher Theatre
1983–1984	The Human Comedy	Bess Macauley	Royale Theatre
1984	Henry V	Katherine	Delacorte Theatre
1985	A Christmas Carol	Ghost of Christmas Past	Symphony Space
1985	Measure for Measure	Isabella	Delacorte Theatre
1985	The Marriage of Figaro	Suzanne	Circle in the Square
1987	The Knife	Jenny	The Public Theater
1989	Twelfth Night	Viola	Delacorte Theatre
1996	Northeast Local	Gi	Mitzi E. Newhouse Theater
2002	Man of La Mancha	Aldonza	Martin Beck Theater
2004	Grand Hotel	Elizaveta Grushinskaya	Donmar Warehouse
2009	A View from the Bridge	Beatrice	Duke of York's Theatre
2013	The Winslow Boy	Grace Winslow	American Airlines Theatre
