= Colm Bairéad =

Irish filmmaker

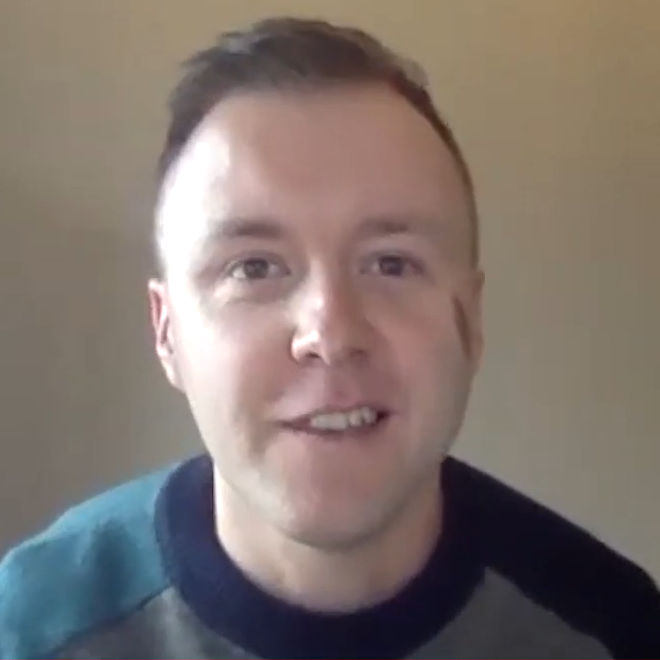
- Bairéad in 2022
- Born: 1981 (age 44–45); Dublin, Ireland
- Occupations: Director; screenwriter
- Known for: The Quiet Girl
- Spouse: Cleona Ní Chrualaoí
- Website: Official website

Colm Bairéad (/bəˈreɪd/ bə-RAID; born 1981) is an Irish film director and screenwriter. He wrote and directed the film The Quiet Girl (2022).

== Career ==
Born in Dublin in 1981, Bairéad grew up speaking English and Irish at home.

The Quiet Girl (Irish: An Cailín Ciúin), Bairéad's first feature film, premiered at the 72nd Berlinale in 2022 and has received critical acclaim. He adapted the film's mostly Irish-language screenplay from the 2010 short story "Foster" by Claire Keegan. At the 18th Irish Film & Television Awards, The Quiet Girl won Best Film and Bairéad won Best Director, and it was nominated for Best International Feature Film at the 95th Academy Awards in the US.

== Influences ==
Bairéad participated in the 2022 edition of the Sight & Sound film polls, which are held every 10 years to commemorate the greatest films of all time and rank them in order. Directors and critics both give their 10 favorite films of all time for the poll; Bairéad picked Ikiru (1952), Citizen Kane (1941), The Life of Oharu (1952), 2001: A Space Odyssey (1968), In the Mood for Love (2000), Ivan's Childhood (1962), Salvatore Giuliano (1962), The Spirit of the Beehive (1973), Goodfellas (1990), and Camera Buff (1979).

== Personal life ==
Bairéad is married to Cleona Ní Chrualaoí, who produced The Quiet Girl. They have two children.

== Partial filmography ==
Short film

Year	Title	Director	Writer
2003	Screwed	Yes	Yes
2005	Mac an Athar (His Father's Son)	Yes	Yes
2009	Finscéal Pháidí	Yes	Yes

Documentary film

- Lorg na gCos: Súil Siar ar Mise Éire (2012)
- Frank O'Connor: Idir Dhá Shruth (2016)

Television

Year	Title	Director	Writer	Notes
2015	The Joy	Yes	No	Miniseries
2018	Murdair Mhám Trasna	Yes	Yes	TV movie

Feature film

Year	Title	Director	Writer
2022	The Quiet Girl	Yes	Yes
