= Carrie Crowley =

Irish actress and broadcaster

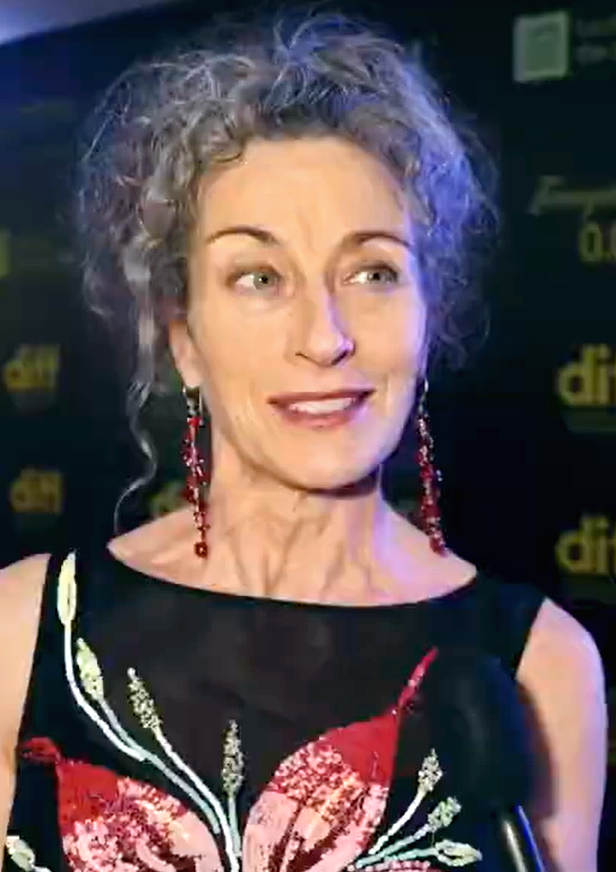
- Crowley at Dublin International Film Festival 2025
- Born: Caroline Anne Crowley; 23 May 1964 (age 62); Waterford, Ireland
- Education: St. Patrick's College, Drumcondra
- Occupations: Television presenter, actress
- Known for: Appearing in The Morbegs, presenting Eurovision Song Contest 1997
- Spouse: Ross Kelly (m. 2005)

Caroline Anne Crowley (born 23 May 1964) is an Irish actress and former radio and television presenter.

She had her own chat show, Limelight, and co-presented the Eurovision Song Contest 1997 with Ronan Keating. Her acting credits include The Clinic, School Run, An Crisis, and Fair City. She appeared as Elisef in the first two seasons of the TV series Vikings. She was nominated for a Best Supporting Actress IFTA award for her performance in the 2022 Academy Award nominated film An Cailín Ciúin (The Quiet Girl).

== Early life ==
Crowley was born and raised in Waterford in the southeast of Ireland. Her mother, Nodhlaig, who was from The Rosses in the west of County Donegal in Ulster, was a teacher and her father, Con, who was from Cork in Munster, was a garda. She has one sister, Bríd. She first performed on stage in a local production of Oliver!. She moved to the Connemara Gaeltacht at age 10 to learn Irish. She graduated with a B.Ed. from St. Patricks College, Drumcondra.

== Career ==
Before she began a career in television, Crowley was a primary school teacher.

Crowley began her broadcasting career on local radio in her home city of Waterford on WLR FM, and presented several different shows between 1991 and 1996 before moving to RTÉ. She started out in children's programming, co-presenting the Irish language versions of Echo Island with comedian Dara Ó Briain, and starring in the pre-school series The Morbegs as the character Liodain.

In 1997, Crowley was offered the role as presenter of the Eurovision Song Contest 1997 (hosted by RTÉ), with Ronan Keating. She also appeared before the Eurovision Song Contest in 1998, speaking to Terry Wogan and wishing him and Ulrika Jonsson well before they started presenting the show.

After presenting the Eurovision, Crowley became one of the biggest stars on RTÉ in the 1990s. During the height of her popularity, she worked on several shows on RTÉ. She presented Potluck Mondays to Fridays at 5:30, on a Thursday night she had her own health show called Pulse, and on Sundays she had her own prime-time chat show called Limelight. Limelight ran for two seasons.

She later left television presenting and returned to radio presenting, co-presenting Fandango with Ray D'Arcy on RTÉ Radio 1. She appeared on RTÉ Radio 1 every Sunday night. Crowley has since distanced herself from her RTÉ career, describing herself as an "accidental tourist" at the station.

== Acting career ==
In 2008, Crowley appeared in the TG4 drama The Running Mate and TV3's School Run in 2009. Also in 2009, she appeared in The Clinic. She has starred in Irish language short films including An Gaeilgeoir Nocht and has appeared in an episode of the Irish language television series An Crisis. She appeared in the drama series for TG4 called Anseo. In 2010, she worked on a play called The Adventures of the Wet Senor with collaborators including Dónal O'Kelly and Kíla. From October 2014 to 2018, she was a cast member in Fair City.

In 2022, she appeared in An Cailín Ciúin, an Irish-language drama film that was elected as Ireland's submission for Best International Feature Film at the 95th Academy Awards and the first Irish film in history to achieve the nomination. For her role in the film, she was nominated at the IFTA for Best Supporting Actress.

In 2025, she played the lead role in another Irish-language film, Aontas, a crime thriller that became selected as the Irish entry for Best International Feature Film at the 99th Academy Awards.

== Personal life ==
In 2004, she married her long-time partner Ross Kelly, whom she had met in 1996.

== See also ==
- List of Eurovision Song Contest presenters

Preceded by (Norway) Morten Harket & Ingvild Bryn	Eurovision Song Contest presenter (with Ronan Keating); 1997	Succeeded by (United Kingdom) Terry Wogan & Ulrika Jonsson
