= Joseph Conlan =

American movie composer

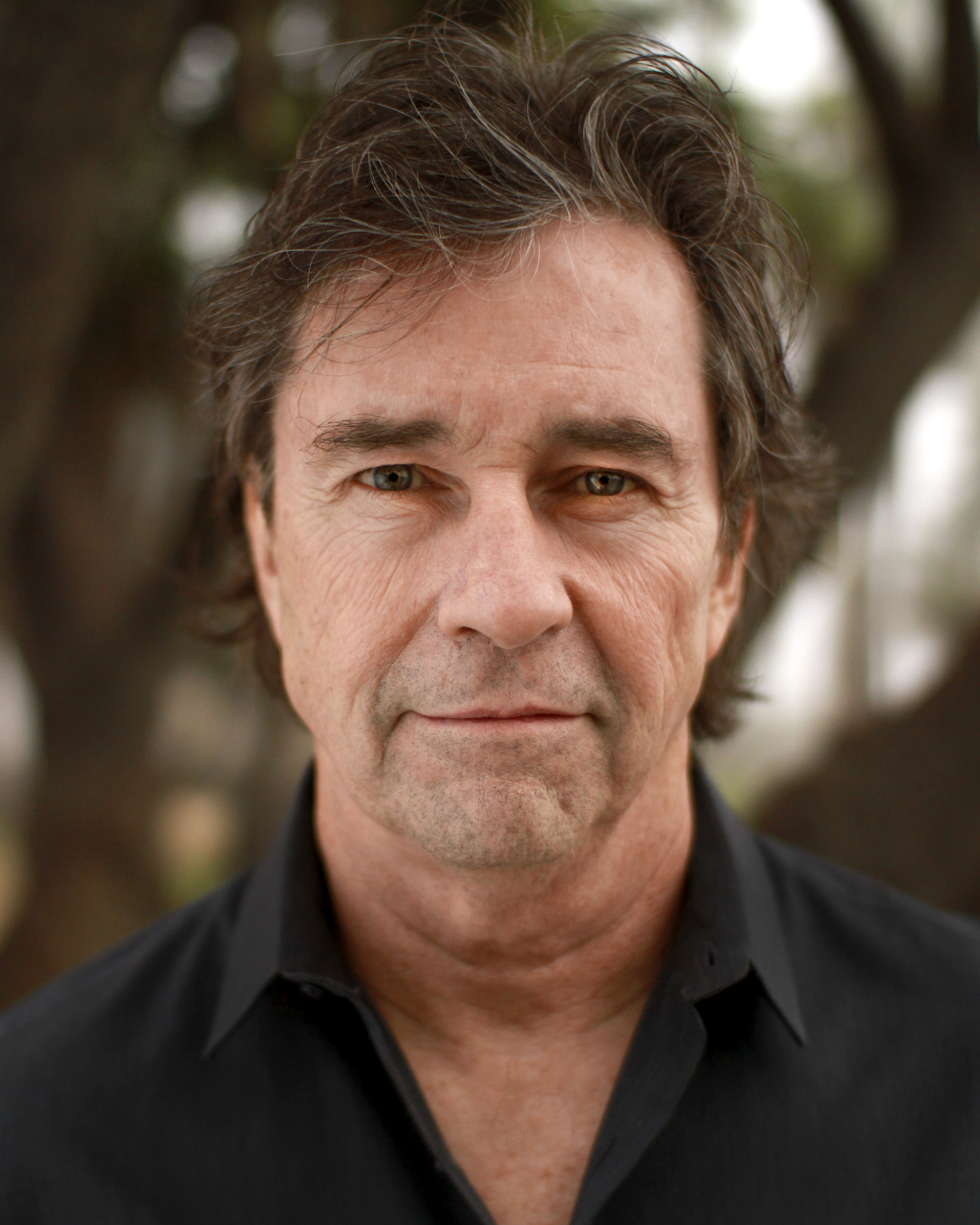

Background information
- Origin: Brooklyn, US
- Genre: Film score
- Occupation: Film score somposer
- Instrument: Computers
- Website: www.josephconlan.com

Joseph Richard Conlan is an American film and television composer based in Los Angeles. He is best known for his scores to the television series NCIS, Tour of Duty and Simon & Simon, and films Spiders 3D and Behind Enemy Lines: Colombia. Conlan is also known for integrating electronic music textures with conventional orchestration. He has received several awards and nominations.

== Film and television scoring ==
Conlan's earliest notable television credits are Simon & Simon, Tour of Duty, The Equalizer and V: The Final Battle. Recent feature scores include Toolbox Murders and Mortuary (for legendary film director Tobe Hooper), Behind Enemy Lines: Colombia (dir.: Tim Matheson), Spiders 3D (dir.: Tibor Takács), and for television, the series NCIS. Most recently Conlan wrote the romantic-comedy scores to the feature films Sanctuary for director Len Colin and The Callback Queen for Film Venture London and director Graham Cantwell. Conlan has been nominated for two EMMY awards, one for Mortal Sins (starring Christopher Reeve) and another for Miracle Run (starring Aidan Quinn and Zac Efron). Conlan has also won Best Score at The Underground Cinema Awards (2010) for his score to the short film No Justice (directed by Dublin director Alan Walsh) and won Best Song at the Rome International Film Festival (2004) for the title song "Finding Home" (lyric by Holly Conlan).

Conlan has dual citizenship with the U.S. and Ireland (EU).

== Early years and influences ==
Born in Brooklyn, New York, a fortuitous move at the age of five brought Conlan and his family to Los Angeles to set down new roots. At the age of eight, a tortuous, stilted regimen of piano lessons began, but by age eleven a new, younger teacher had opened Conlan's eyes to the more theoretical dimensions of music and the magic of chords. Conlan began to hone his craft as early as high school, writing music for various ensembles and choirs. But it was not until a friend introduced him to Earle Hagen's seminal book, Scoring for Film, that Conlan realized how he should apply his passion.

After a few years of writing commercial jingles for Santa Barbara radio stations, Conlan began to work for Hagen on the TV series Eight Is Enough. This introduction to television led him to work with composers Mark Snow on Starsky & Hutch and Hart to Hart and Hoyt Curtin on Hanna-Barbera's Smurfs and Popeye. Conlan's first screen credit soon followed when Barry De Vorzon brought him on to write the score for the new series Simon & Simon.

Conlan's musical influences reach from Lennon/McCartney and James Taylor to Claude Debussy and Aaron Copland, to Tom Scott, Radiohead, The Chemical Brothers and Irish folk music. His film scores are just as eclectic, ranging from dark psychological thrillers to romantic comedies, from conventional orchestral arrangements to electronic and more experimental instrumentation. Along with his strong sense of theme and rhythmic texture, the technique of combining conventional instrumentation with manipulated, twisted and textural sound design elements that he has created, allows Conlan to produce a distinctive score for each project.

== Awards and nominations ==
=== Awards ===
- 2010 The Underground Cinema Awards for Best Score - No Justice
- 2005 BMI TV Music Award - NCIS
- 2004 Rome Film Festival for Best Score - Finding Home
- 1985 BMI TV Music Award - Simon & Simon

=== Nominations ===
- 2004 Emmy Award for Best Score - Miracle Run
- 1992 Emmy Award for Best Score - Mortal Sins
