= Graham Cantwell =

Irish film and television director

- Born: 25 March 1974 (age 51); Dublin, Ireland
- Occupations: Director, Screenwriter
- Years active: 1999–present
- Height: 6 ft 2 in (188 cm)
- Website: www.GrahamCantwell.com

Graham Cantwell (born 25 March 1974) is an Irish film and television director. He is best known for directing feature film Anton which achieved a three-week domestic cinema release and was nominated for three Irish Film and Television Awards in 2009. His short film A Dublin Story was shortlisted for Academy Award Nomination in 2004 having picked up several film festival awards. In 2010 he directed a new television drama The Guards for TV3 in Ireland. Most recently he directed a romantic comedy set in the film industry in London, The Callback Queen, which premiered at The Galway Film Fleadh in July 2013 and screened in the U.S. at The Jean Cocteau Cinema, owned and run by George R. R. Martin.

In addition to his directing works he is co-founder of Film Venture London and The Attic Studio in Dublin. In 2006 he developed and staged the European premiere of Babylon Heights by Irvine Welsh (of Trainspotting fame) and Dean Cavanagh.

He is represented by Felix de Wolfe in London.

== Selected filmography ==
Year	Title	Format	Awards
2013	The Callback Queen	Feature Film	
2010	The Guards	TV Series	
2009	The Letter	Short Film	
2009	The Making of Anton	Feature length Documentary	
2008	Anton (2008 film)	Feature Film	2009 Irish Film & Television Awards Nomination: Best Cinematography; 2009 Irish Film & Television Awards Nomination: Best Original Score; 2009 Irish Film & Television Awards Nomination: Best Supporting Actor
2007	Dublin 26.06.08: A Movie in 4 Days	Feature Film	
2007	The Coalboat Kids	TV pilot	
2007	A Dublin Story	Short Film	Galway Film Fleadh 2003: Kodak Tiernan McBride Award, Best Short Foyle International Film Festival 2003: Festival Prize, Best Short Film; Academy Awards 2004: Nomination Shortlist, Best Live Action Short; Tirana Film Festival 2004: Special Mention; Worldfest Houston 2004: Bronze Remi
