= Film censorship in the Republic of Ireland =

Film censorship in the Republic of Ireland began on a national basis with the introduction of the Censorship of Films Act in 1923. This act established the office of the Censor of Films, an office since replaced and renamed in 2008 as the Irish Film Classification Office.

== Approach ==
During the early and mid-20th century, the original Film Censors Office heavily cut films and videos for rental release, or placed high age ratings on them. Figures released by the Film Censors Office state that 2,500 films received theatrical performance bans, and over 11,000 films were cut, between the 1920s and 1980s. Films previously banned in Ireland have included Scarface (1932), A Clockwork Orange (1971), and Monty Python's Life of Brian (1979).

Since the release of Michael Collins in 1996, which was rated PG in cinemas despite its depictions of "explicit cruelty", the censor's office has generally applied age ratings and has not requested cuts to films. Former head censor Sheamus Smith (who held the position between 1986 and 2002) banned several but rarely cut them as his predecessors did, despite frequent requests from distributors to secure lower certificates and wider audiences. Smith wasn't fond of his official 'Film Censor' title as he felt that the term was emotive and implied someone who "butchers or bans movies". Smith believed that a director's vision should remain intact regardless of the certificate and that "it's an arrogance for a censor or classifier to be cutting up and changing it".

Current director Ger Connolly follows the same policy, although one instance of cutting involving previous censor John Kelleher exists, regarding Korean horror film The Isle. He didn't force censorship upon the film's distributor, but didn't immediately grant a certificate after viewing it on 8 September (just two days before its original release date) and "drew attention to scenes of sexual violence and explicit self-mutilation that were causing us concern". He gave them two options – either they could resubmit it for a second viewing/re-assessment or submit a censored version to secure a certificate. The distributor, Tartan, went with the latter, removing 3m 15s on top of 1m 50s already removed by the BBFC showing animal cruelty, specifically shots of a drowning bird and mutilated fish, which earned them an 18 certificate on 29 September – the changes weren't legally required but sped up the release process.

== Legislation ==
The main legislation under which Irish films are rated and censored include:

- The Censorship of Films Act, 1923 was an act "to provide for the official censoring of cinematographic pictures and for other matters connected therewith". It established the office of the Official Censor of Films and a Censorship of Films Appeal Board (see William Magennis) and that no film be exhibited in public without a certificate.
- The Censorship of Films Act, 1923 was amended by the Censorship of Films (Amendment) Act, 1925, in connection with advertisements for films. It was amended by the Censorship of Films (Amendment) Act, 1930 to extend the legislation to "vocal or other sounds" accompanying pictures.
- The Emergency Powers Act 1939 dealt with the preservation of the State in time of war and contained provisions relating to the censorship of communications, including mail, newspapers and periodicals.
- The Censorship of Films (Amendment) Act 1970 allowed films to be resubmitted for certification seven years after being rejected.
- The Video Recordings Act, 1989 adds video/DVD recordings to the Film Censor's responsibility to examine. A different classification can be given than the same feature film was give but the censor cannot refuse to grant a certificate for a video if a certificate is in force for the same feature film.

== Notable banned or cut films ==
While a number of films were formerly banned or cut by the Film Censor's Office, a review in 2000 meant that many of these have since been un-banned and rated anywhere from G to 18. During that review process it was decided that no more films would be banned for either cinema or video release, but some bans are still in place.

Prior to the Video Recordings Act 1989, many films which were banned in the cinema were freely available on video tape to anyone in Ireland regardless of age.

A notable recent ban was that of Boy Eats Girl in 2005, a film starring Samantha Mumba, due its graphic depiction of a suicide attempt. Following an appeal, it was passed uncut with a 15A rating, far from the highest possible.

The listed year refers to when the film was banned by the Office, not necessarily as the original release date:

Date	Title	Notes	Post-ban/current certificate
1927	The Unknown	Banned on 27 August for its cruel sensationalism and semi-nudity of the heroine. As with Frankenstein, the unrestricted General certificate caused concern for 'youngsters and nervous adults'. The Appeal Board upheld the rejection in the same year, though no specific date is available.	
1931	Dracula	Passed with proposed cuts on 5 June, with a request for the distributor to "delete some of the horrors and re-show the film".	PG (DVD)
1932	Monkey Business	Banned because censors feared it would encourage anarchic tendencies. Passed on 8 January with '16 unspecified cuts to script', including characters falling over each other in a dance scene.	G (DVD)
1932	Frankenstein	Banned on 5 February for being demoralising and unsuitable for children or 'nervous people' – age-restricted certificates weren't introduced until 1965. Overturned by the Appeal Board on 8 March and given an uncut certificate on 9 March.	G (cinema, 1932) PG (DVD)
1932	Scarface	Banned on 19 August. Upheld by the Films Appeal Board on 30 September. Banned on 29 August 1941 (under the alternate title of 'Gang War'). Upheld by the Films Appeal Board on 7 October. Banned on 24 April 1953 (under the original title). No appeal was lodged. Various reasons cited include pandering to sensationalism, glamorizing the gangster lifestyle and implying an incestuous relationship between the protagonist and his sister.	PG (DVD)
1942	Fantasia	Initially cut on 30 April. Dr. Richard Hayes (Film Censor from October 1940 to January 1954) cut the scientific talk which introduces the 'Rite of Spring' section, stating that it 'gave an entirely materialistic view of the origin of life' – it has since been reinstated.	G (DVD)
1942	A Day in Soviet Russia	Passed with "extensive cuts under the EPO" (for infringing on wartime neutrality) on 2 June 1942. The documentary was advertised to open on a Sunday but the certificate was withdrawn on Saturday afternoon.	
1943	Casablanca	Banned on 19 March for infringing on the Emergency Powers Order preserving wartime neutrality, by portraying Vichy France and Nazi Germany in a "sinister light". Passed with cuts on 15 June 1945 after the EPO was lifted – this time the cuts were to dialogue between Rick and Ilsa referring to their love affair. Passed with one cut on 16 July 1974. RTÉ inquired about showing the film on television – it still required a dialogue cut to Ilsa expressing her love for Rick. All releases since are uncut.	G (DVD)
1943	A Yank in the RAF	Passed with 30 cuts on 10 August due to the EPO. It was passed on 27 July 1945 after the EPO was lifted, this time with only five cuts. The certificate was withdrawn after one week's run at the Savoy Cinema in September after 41,000 had seen the film.	G (DVD)
1943	The Outlaw	Banned due to sexual references.	
1945	Mildred Pierce		PG (DVD)
1945	Brief Encounter	Initially banned as it was considered too permissive of adultery – ban lifted.	PG (DVD)
1946	The Big Sleep	Initially banned because of its sexual references – ban lifted.	PG (DVD)
1950	Outrage	Banned due to its rape theme.	
1959	Anatomy of a Murder	Banned on 15 October, which was upheld on appeal on 15 December. This was due to its "utterly clinical dialogue" during detailed references to rape, within the central courtroom trial. When resubmitted on 24 February 1960, these were entirely removed in 53 separate cuts, totalling 15 minutes. Passed uncut for video in 2001, with a 12 certificate.	G (cut, cinema) 12 (uncut, DVD)
1966	Pasażerka	Initially banned and described by the censor as a "horror film" – he also objected to a scene showing naked women being driven to the camp. Overturned by the Films Appeal Board, with a 16 certificate.	16 (cinema)
1967	Ulysses	Based on the book by James Joyce, it was banned for being "subversive to public morality", upheld by the Films Appeal Board and banned for a second time in 1975 – ban lifted in September 2000 at director Joseph Strick's request, with a 15 certificate. although it was screened at the Irish Film Theatre (a private club cinema) in the late 1970s. The first public screening was held in February 2001, with then-censor Sheamus Smith and Strick both in attendance. It went on general release at the IFI from 8 February 2001.	15 (cinema and DVD)
1971	Five Easy Pieces	Banned on 8 June. Referred to the Appeals Board on 29 July and overturned on 9 August, with cuts and a 16 certificate: two uses of "Jesus Christ"; two uses of "shit"; the entire unfaithful sex scene between Bobby and Betty; Passed uncut with a 15 certificate for DVD.	16 (cinema) [censored] 15 (DVD)
1971	Get Carter	Banned in August. Upheld by the Appeals Board in November.	18 (cinema and DVD) (theme of child sexual abuse and pornography – 2014) (explicit sexual images - 2022)
1971	The Devils	Warner Bros. refused to present this Ken Russell film before the censor due to concerns regarding its excessive violence, giving the film a de facto ban from the country.	
1973	Everything You Always Wanted to Know About Sex	Banned on 20 March. A cut version was passed in 1979 and released theatrically in 1980, removing both a bestiality reference ("the greatest lay I ever had", referring to a sheep) and a man having sex with a bread loaf – ban/censorship lifted.	18 (cinema and DVD)
1973	A Clockwork Orange	Banned on 10 April – Warner Bros. decided against appealing due to the film causing public controversy. Passed uncut for cinema on 13 December 1999, with an 18 certificate, and released on 17 March 2000. The re-release poster was rejected due to the words "ultra-violence" and "rape" in the tagline (it's a replica of the original British version). Sheamus Smith explained his rejection to the Irish Times; "I believe that the use of those words in the context of advertising would be offensive and inappropriate".	18 (cinema and DVD)
1980	Monty Python's Life of Brian	Banned on 29 April, as reject #3158. Upheld by the Film Appeals Board, in a 5:2 vote, on 26 June. Overturned by the Film Appeals Board on 7 August 1987, with an 18 certificate.	18 (cinema, 1987) 15 (DVD)
1980	Zombie Flesh Eaters	Banned on 14 October. Overturned by the Films Appeal Board on 31 October, with an 18 certificate. Re-banned for video in 1994 as prohibition order #702 and passed in 2012.	18 (very strong and gory violence – 2012) (cinema and DVD)
1981	Last Tango in Paris	Banned on 17 November.	18 (DVD)
1982	Porky's	Banned on 1 February. Overturned by the Film Appeals Board on 19 February, with a 16 certificate.	16 (cinema) 18 (DVD)
1982	Richard Pryor: Live on the Sunset Strip	Banned on 23 July, as reject #3174. Upheld by the Film Appeals Board, in a 3:2 vote, on 6 September.	18 (DVD)
1982	Fast Times at Ridgemont High	Banned on 8 October. Overturned by the Film Appeals Board on 29 October, with cuts and an 18 certificate.	18 (cinema and DVD)
1982	Monsignor	Banned on 29 November due to its conflation of religion and adultery, as it features an affair between a priest and a postulant nun. Overturned by the Film Appeals Board on 17 December, with an 16 certificate. The decision caused controversy among members of Fianna Fáil – chairman Ned Brennan believed the majority of the Irish public didn't want it to be released and said "standards must be maintained", wanting it banned on "moral grounds".	16 (cinema)
1983	Monty Python's The Meaning of Life	Banned on 27 June, as reject #3181. Upheld by the Films Appeal Board on 14 July.	15 (DVD)
1985	Crimes of Passion	Banned on 18 November, as reject #3189.	18 (DVD)
1987	Personal Services	Banned on 13 March, as reject #3190. Overturned by the Film Appeals Board on 12 May, in a 6:2 vote and with an 18 certificate.	18 (cinema and DVD)
1987	Working Girls	Banned on 12 August, as reject #3191. Upheld by the Film Appeals Board on 28 September, in a 7:1 vote.	
1991	Whore	Banned on 9 August, as reject #3202. Upheld by the Films Appeal Board on 20 September (unanimously), although an earlier meeting held on 28 August failed to come to a decision. This all postponed the Irish home release, due on the week of the failed appeal with 2,000 copies. The video distributor (National Cable Vision) submitted a tape to Smith for a reconsideration on home media, where it had the unfortunate honor of being the first ever banned video – new legislation providing that power had been passed in July.	
1991	The Texas Chain Saw Massacre	Banned for video as prohibition order #3 – revoked on 2 September 1999 with an 18 certificate.	18 (DVD) (strong horror and bloody violence – 2013)
1993	Bad Lieutenant	Banned on 29 January, due to being "blasphemous and profane" alongside its "demeaning treatment of women", as reject #3206. Upheld by the Film Appeals Board on 18 February, although two members felt an 18 certificate was appropriate. Re-banned on 1 April 2003 for video, as prohibition order #3.	
1994	Natural Born Killers	Banned on 11 October, because Sheamus Smith was concerned about "copycat" killings linked to it, as reject #3214. Upheld by the Films Appeal Board, in a 6:1 vote and after Smith made a "strong recommendation" to do so, on 20 January 1995. Re-banned in 1995 for video, as prohibition order #335. Revoked on 1 May 2001 with an 18 certificate.	18 (DVD)
1994	Dangerous Game	Banned for video as prohibition order #539, due to a "violent scene of anal rape". The cinema distributors (Abbey Films) never submitted it for an Irish theatrical release. PolyGram appealed the decision – the viewing took place on 23 November, where the ban was upheld.	
1994	I Spit on Your Grave	Banned on video four times: in 1994 (prohibition order #701), 2000, 5 February 2002 and 14 September 2010 (#1 the latter times). Then-acting director Ger Connolly "(did) not wish to be drawn into what appears to be a publicity drive on the part of the film's director", but stood by the decision for "sustained, graphic and brutal sexual violence".	
1995	Showgirls	Banned on 8 November – no reason was given but speculation pointed towards the rape scene, which was initially cut in the UK. Passed uncut on 23 October 2017 for video, with an 18 certificate.	18 (DVD)
1996	From Dusk till Dawn	Banned for cinema on 1 May, due to its "irresponsible and totally gratuitous" violence, especially in the wake of the then-recent Dunblane and Port Arthur massacres. Also banned for video as prohibition order #385. Revoked on 27 January 2004 with an 18 certificate.	18 (DVD)
1997	Crash	Passed with one cut of 35 seconds to sexually explicit dialogue, in the sex scene between James and Catherine where she fantasizes about Vaughn. This was in an attempt to dissuade the distributors from releasing it on video, as they'd have to prepare a specially cut Irish version at high expense for a small market but it did not work.	18 (DVD)
1997	Preaching to the Perverted	Banned for cinema on 28 October and later on video – the trailer caused a mass recall of Donnie Brasco's rental video (which had been passed as an 18), due to having not been classified. 3,300 copies were withdrawn and replaced, with a potential fine of €1000 to stores providing it.	
1997	Retroactive	Banned for video as prohibition order #97. Revoked on 20 November with an 18 certificate.	18 (DVD)
1999	Freaks	Banned for video as prohibition order #134 on 7 February, for being "grossly offensive to disabled people", according to video censors Violet Ennis and (eventual director) Ger Connolly. This was because "it assumes that all members of this group would exact a dreadful punishment on those who ridiculed or looked down on them. (The) inclusion of so many abnormalities (was for) the purpose of horrifying the viewer (and) to create a feeling of revulsion."	
1999	The Driller Killer	Banned for video in June.	
1999	From Dusk Till Dawn 2: Texas Blood Money	Banned for video as prohibition order #165. Revoked on 16 November 2004 with an 18 certificate.	18 (DVD)
1999	The Idiots	Banned for video on 26 October, no doubt due to unsimulated sexual content showing an erection and vaginal penetration.	
2000	No Way Out	Banned for video as prohibition order #40 – revoked on 31 August with an 18 certificate, as a majority decision out of four voters. This was one of seven WWF videos banned between 2000-2001, one of three appealed, and the only one overturned, with Fully Loaded and WrestleMania 16 remaining banned. Of the seventy wrestling videos submitted to the IFCO between 1998-2001, thirteen were (initially) banned, twenty-two had 15 certificates and thirty-three had 18 certificates.	18 (DVD)
2000	Of Freaks and Men	Banned for video on 21 October due to sadistic scenes of sexual humiliation.	
2001	WrestleMania 16	Banned for video on 27 March due to the use of realistic weapons, including metal chairs, timber wrapped with barbed wire, shinai and sledgehammers. Deputy censor Audrey Conlon cited the crowd cheering for increasingly extreme violence as a reason for the decision. While Clear Vision Ltd. lodged a (failed) appeal and stated that "our fans love the wild soap opera element", the censor's office countered this by stating that this was "one of the most dangerous and pernicious aspects of the entire business". This was one of seven WWF videos banned between 2000-2001, one of three appealed, and one of two upheld alongside Fully Loaded, with only No Way Out being overturned."	
2002	Cradle of Fear	Banned on 28 March for video.	
2002	Riki-Oh: The Story of Ricky	Banned on 28 March for video.	
2002	For Your Pleasure	Banned on 28 March for video.	
2002	Turkish Delight	Banned on 26 August for video.	
2002	The Pornographer	Banned on 30 September for video. The censored UK version was submitted, which had already removed 12s showing ejaculation for a BBFC 18 certificate.	
2002	Baise-moi	Banned on 28 November for video. Upheld by the Films Appeal Board on 27 January 2003. It released theatrically in the summer of 2002, but only on a club basis at the IFI, where admission was restricted to members and guests of 18 years and over.	
2003	Man Bites Dog	Banned on 20 March for video.	
2003	Spun	Banned on 8 July under Section 7 (2) of the Censorship of Films Act, 1923. According to Kelleher, he didn't object to the content and only banned it to showcase a legal anomaly, meaning that video and cinema releases of the same work automatically got the same rating. He knew the ban would be reversed and the law was changed soon after. Overturned by the Films Appeal Board on 21 July.	18 (cinema and DVD)
2005	Boy Eats Girl	Banned for containing a realistic/imitable suicide attempt, of a teenage boy hanging himself from a cupboard door, unless the scene was removed. The decision was reversed, uncut, on 25 July.	15A (cinema) 18 (DVD)
2005	Deep Throat	The uncut version was banned on 13 September for video. A censored version was passed '18' as in the UK (where the uncut version got an 'R18', meaning it could only be bought in licensed sex shops) – all hardcore scenes were re-framed. As in the UK, the accompanying documentary Inside Deep Throat was passed 18 uncut (for cinema and video) due to the explicit sexual images appearing in a documentary context. The uncut, R18 version of the film itself was only screened in the UK on a double bill with Inside... "merely to put the documentary into context", according to a spokespersion for distributor Momentum Pictures.	18 (DVD) [censored]

== Film ratings ==
Eight film rating categories exist, although a film may have been re-rated by the time of its video/DVD release.

Symbol	Name	Cinema	Video	Consumer advice
	General	✓	✓	Suitable for children of a school going age. Theme – such films will not include themes or content that will upset younger children. Violence – mild and unsustained. There will be an absence of blood or injury detail and any outcome will be reassuring. Sexual content/nudity – very mild (e.g., kissing, dating, references to ‘making love’). In certain circumstances, non-sexual nudity may be acceptable. Language – may include infrequent use of mild bad language and slang. Drugs – forbidden unless clearly set within an educational context.
	Parental; Guidance	✓	✓	Suitable for children aged eight and over. Theme – while more mature issues might be addressed (e.g., war, family issues) there will generally be a positive or redemptive resolution. Violence – frightening sequences should not be sustained or graphic. However, some stronger violence may be permissible in what is clearly a fantasy or comic context. Sexual content/nudity – mild; any sexual activity will be implied rather than depicted. Subtle innuendo may be accepted. Language – mild. However, in rare instances, a PG film may contain infrequent strong language provided it is used discreetly and is contextually justified. Discriminatory or racist terms will only be acceptable if used in a clearly educational context. Drugs – any references to drug use should be mild and will relate to soft drug use only. Where stronger references are made they will be set within a clearly educational context.
	12A	✓	✗	Suitable for viewers of twelve and over. However, they can also be seen by younger children – provided they are accompanied by an adult who has deemed the film appropriate viewing for that child. Theme – mature themes are acceptable (crime, bereavement, relationships, etc.) provided they are depicted in a fashion suitable for young teenagers (i.e., in such a way that they will already have been familiar with in their everyday lives). Themes of suicide or self-harm or other imitable behaviour will only be acceptable if depicted without detail and in a clearly educational context. Violence – moderate violence and more prolonged threat/horror are acceptable at 12A. This is particularly the case when depicted in a fantasy context (common at this category). Stronger images of injury detail may be acceptable if justified by the context in which they are presented (i.e., in an accurate depiction of warfare). Sexual content/nudity – sexual content (situations and dialogue) presented without explicit detail may be acceptable at 12A. Brief sexual nudity may also be acceptable. Language – some infrequent strong language may be acceptable, but should be used in a non-aggressive manner. Use of discriminatory language should be justified by the overall context of the film. Drugs – images of or references to soft drugs may be permitted in an appropriate context. Generally, content relating to hard drugs is not acceptable unless there is a clear anti-drug message and the misuse of drugs is not glamorized. Announced on 9 December 2004 and took effect on 1 January 2005.
	12	✗	✓	Suitable for viewers of twelve and over. The guidelines for 12 are identical to the guidelines for 12A.
	15A	✓	✗	Suitable for viewers of 15 and over. However, they can also be seen by younger children – provided they are accompanied by an adult who has deemed the film appropriate viewing for that child. Theme – most themes/content will be acceptable with classification decided by the way the subject is treated. Violence – this may be realistic but not gratuitous or focus on bloody injury. Strong gory images will only be permitted if justified by the context in which they are presented. We take particular account of the way in which sexual violence is portrayed. Any such content in this category should be discreetly presented and contextually justified. Generally, horror in this category will be psychological in nature. Acts of sadism common to the genre are not permissible. Sexual content/nudity – strong sex references may be acceptable. Scenes of a sexual nature may also be acceptable but will not be explicit or prolonged. Language – strong language is allowed. Frequent or aggressive use of these terms will have to be justified within the context of the piece. Drugs – scenes or dialogue relating to drugs may be acceptable in an appropriate context, but not if there is glamorization, instruction or encouragement as to use. Announced on 9 December 2004 and took effect on 1 January 2005.
	15	✗	✓	Suitable for viewers of 15 and over. The guidelines for 15 are identical to the guidelines for 15A.
	16	✓	✗	Suitable for viewers of 16 and over. Theme – most themes/content will be acceptable with classification decided by the way the subject is treated. Violence – this might be intensely depicted and may include some gory imagery. We take particular account of the way in which sexual violence is portrayed. The portrayal of such content in this category should not be explicit and must have clear contextual justification. Strong horror and sustained threat may be acceptable but will not include the strongest images of sadism and torture. Sexual content/nudity – strong sexual themes and content may be permissible provided it is not gratuitous. Language – strong language is acceptable. Drugs – themes and scenes relating to hard drug use might feature. However, any instructional or glamorised drug use, particularly involving teen protagonists, is unlikely to be acceptable. Announced on 9 December 2004 and took effect on 1 January 2005. Because there is no direct equivalent on video, a film rated 16 for cinema can get either a 15 or 18 on video, depending on its strength.
	18	✓	✓	Suitable for viewers of eighteen or over. One of IFCO's guiding principles is that adults (i.e., persons over 18) should be free, within the law, to choose what they wish to view.

There are three former categories no longer in use:

Symbol	Name	Cinema	Video	Consumer advice	Example films
	12RA	✗	✓	Suitable for viewers of 12 and over. Cannot be supplied to anyone under the age of 12, and which has a suggestion for a "Responsible Adult" to be present if a younger person watches the film (no longer issued). If re-released, the rating is automatically changed to 12 (exceptions are noted in brackets).	Jurassic Park The Lord of the Rings: The Two Towers Star Trek Generations (since re-rated PG in 2009) The Nightmare Before Christmas (since re-rated PG on DVD) Austin Powers: The Spy Who Shagged Me (re-rated 15 at first, then re-rated 12 in 2011) Star Trek V: The Final Frontier (since re-rated PG) Only Fools and Horses – The Complete Series 7 (since re-rated PG) Mighty Morphin Power Rangers: The Movie (since re-rated PG) Pleasantville The Mask Brendan Grace: Live at the Gleneagle, Killarney Police Story 4: First Strike The Bachelor An Evening With Niall Toibin Dumb and Dumberer: When Harry Met Lloyd
	12PG	✓	✗	Suitable for viewers of 12 and over. However, they can also be seen by younger children – provided they are accompanied by an adult who has deemed the film appropriate viewing for that child. Works in the same way as today's 12A. Introduced on 1 June 2001 and replaced by 12A on 1 January 2005. Theme/Content – Likely to feature more mature themes, e.g. Involving crime, conflict, relationships, etc., but young persons of twelve and over will already be familiar with them from their television viewing. Context – A flexibility of approach is retained whereby the context and impact of the film are viewed as a whole, rather than rating it only on the basis of one short image or scene. Violence – Relatively mild or moderate and shouldn't be imitative, gratuitous, nor glamourised. Sexual content/Nudity – Generally, only mild dialogue and natural non-sexual nudity are acceptable. Drugs – Mild or brief images of 'soft' drugs may be permitted in an appropriate context, but normally no images of or references to 'hard' drugs are acceptable. Language – Commonly used milder swear words may be acceptable, but not sexually violent, explicit or threatening language.	Pearl Harbor (the first film with a 12PG rating) Hulk Die Another Day The Lord of the Rings: The Return of the King
	15PG	✓	✗	Suitable for viewers of 15 and over. However, they can also be seen by younger children – provided they are accompanied by an adult who has deemed the film appropriate viewing for that child. Works in the same way as today's 15A. Introduced on 1 June 2001 and replaced by 15A on 1 January 2005. Theme/Content – Most themes/content will be acceptable with classification normally decided by the way the subject is treated. It is worth noting that our recent nationwide survey research confirms that both parents and adolescents often experience embarrassment when they view films featuring more mature themes (e.g. sexual activity or nudity) in each other's company. Context – Modern adolescents of fifteen and older will generally be aware of, and be able to appreciate, the context of a film. Violence – This may be realistic but not gratuitous, prolonged or overly bloody. We take particular account of the way in which sexual violence is portrayed. Drugs – Scenes/dialogue relating to drugs may be acceptable in an appropriate context, but not if there is instruction or encouragement as to use. Sexual content/Nudity – Mild/moderate sexual activity/nudity is acceptable, particularly when portrayed positively.	The Pianist Alien vs. Predator The Passion of the Christ Bad Santa (this controversial decision led to the creation of the 16 rating – the extended cut is rated 18 on DVD)

The G, PG and 18 certifications have the same principles on video, but some 18s films may be denied a video release certificate.

Films which are banned and do not have an appeal lodged, or which fail on appeal, have an enforcement noticed published in Iris Oifigiúil, the state's journal. The most recent enforcement notice, as of 2005, appeared on 20 September 2005 journal, and was the first of the year. Revocation notices are also published in the journal, where a film has been banned and then allowed. The 2010 DVD release of the 1978 film I Spit on Your Grave is the most recent instance of an IFCO ban.

== Differences between jurisdictions ==
Ratings usually match those of the UK's film classification body, or are one level higher or lower, but rare disparities exist spanning further.

The animated comedy, South Park: Bigger, Longer & Uncut, was rated 18 in Ireland for "vulgarity and toilet humour", which Sheamus Smith "didn't think a 15-year-old really needed to be exposed to". However, the BBFC recognised "the obvious teenage audience for the work, for whom none of the language would come as a surprise", and rated it 15 in the UK for "frequent coarse language and crude sexual references".

Examples of wider variances include the 1990 boxing drama Rocky V, rated PG in the UK for "moderate violence and mild language", but 15 in Ireland - upon original release, Smith objected to the "extreme violence" of the final street fight. UIP appealed for an "under 12's accompanied" certificate, which was unanimously vetoed.

The 1996 historical drama Michael Collins was rated 15 in the UK for "strong violence and strong language", but only PG in Ireland. In what was described as an "unprecedented move", Smith stated that the film was a "landmark in Irish cinema" and that the film should be "available to the widest possible Irish cinema audience".

While the 1999 historical drama The Cider House Rules was only rated 12 in the UK, for "dramatic themes and one brief sex scene", it received the highest possible 18 in Ireland, for "themes of abortion, incest and drugs". Head video censor Audrey Conlon advocated for a 15, on the basis that abortion was an important subject for that age group to discuss. Smith, however, felt the "matter-of-fact" treatment of abortion was inappropriate, given the then-current context of the subject in the country.

== Exceptions ==
The restrictions applied to commercial cinemas did not apply to film clubs. The Irish Film Theatre (1977–1984), its predecessor, the Irish Film Society and its successor, the Irish Film Institute, specialised for decades in showing arthouse films that were uncut because films shown privately were not required to be examined by the Censor's Office. The National Film Institute (later Irish Film Institute) had originally been set up to comply with the 1939 encyclical Vigilanti Cura. At one time this gave rise to a legal anomaly where the 35 mm prints of a particular film would to be required to have any "cuts" mandated by the Film Censors Office whereas the 16 mm prints were not, on the erroneous belief that all 16 mm prints were destined for private film clubs. In practice, some commercial cinemas in smaller towns as well as "travelling cinemas" (often showing films in village halls owned by the Catholic Church) were only equipped to show the 16 mm prints. The closure of virtually all of these smaller cinemas (owing to the rising popularity of television and video) has meant that nowadays the only places showing these 16 mm prints are bona fide film clubs.

== See also ==
- Censorship in the Republic of Ireland
- Book censorship in the Republic of Ireland
- Kevin Rockett, an Irish film historian
