= Toni O'Rourke =

Irish actress

- Education: National Theatre of Ireland
- Occupation: Actress
- Years active: 2007-present
- Television: The Boy That Never Was

Toni O'Rourke is an Irish actress and model. Her television credits include The Boy That Never Was (2024). Her film credits include God's Creatures (2022) and Calm with Horses (2019).

== Career ==
From Dublin, O'Rourke first appeared on television at the age of 13 years-old in 2007 with a guest role as a pregnant teenager in the long-running Irish television series The Clinic. She also appeared in the film What Richard Did (2012). She went on to graduate from the National Theatre of Ireland.

Shortly after graduation, she appeared in Irish film Cardboard Gangsters (2017). O'Rourke's film roles have included portraying Lisa in Calm with Horses (2019) with Cosmo Jarvis and Barry Keoghan, Wildfire (2020), and God's Creatures (2022) alongside Emily Watson and Paul Mescal. Having appeared in the 2020 short film of the same name, she appeared in the feature-length Irish film drama Kathleen Is Here (2024). On stage, O'Rourke’s credits include playing the lead role at the Abbey Theatre in Dublin in a production of Emma by Jane Austen.

O'Rourke had a leading role alongside Colin Morgan in RTÉ drama series The Boy That Never Was (2024), with the pair receiving praise for being "utterly believable" in a drama that was a "harrowing study of grief, guilt, remorse and unravelling mental health". The following year, O'Rourke was cast in India Mullen directed short film Lia & Ro, and could be seen in Irish football comedy film Fran the Man (2025).

O'Rourke has a leading role in ensemble drama series Hunting Alice Bell (2026), written by David Baddiel and Peter Bradshaw for Channel 4.

== Personal life ==
O'Rourke moved from Dublin to Stratford, London. She appeared as a model in Simone Rocha show at London Fashion Week in 2023.

== Partial filmography ==
Key
†	Denotes works that have not yet been released

Year	Title	Role	Notes
2007	The Clinic	Lucy	1 episode
2012	What Richard Did	Zara	
2014	Noble	Angela	
2017	Cardboard Gangsters	Sarah	
2019	Calm with Horses	Lisa	
2020	Cold Courage	Nina	7 episodes
2020	Kathleen Is Here	Carol	Short film
2020	Wildfire	Karen	
2022	God's Creatures	Erin	
2024	Kathleen Is Here	Carol	
2024	The Boy That Never Was	Robin	Lead role. 4 episodes
2025	Fran the Man	Detective Clancy	
2026	Hunting Alice Bell	Ros	6 episodes
