= CNCF =

CNCF may refer to:

- Christina Noble Children's Foundation
- Cloud Native Computing Foundation, a Linux Foundation project
- Concarril, Mexican rail car manufacturer
