= Fran the Man =

Irish sports comedy film

- Poster
- Directed by: Stephen Bradley
- Screenplay by: Richie Conroy
- Based on: Fran by Richie Conroy; Mark Hodkinson
- Produced by: Collie McCarthy
- Starring: Darragh Humphreys; Ardal O'Hanlon; Amy Huberman
- Cinematography: Ross O'Callaghan
- Edited by: Stephen Vickers
- Music by: Stephen Rennicks
- Production companies: RTÉ; Forty Foot Pictures
- Distributed by: Volta Pictures
- Release date: 11 April 2025
- Running time: 84 minutes
- Country: Ireland
- Language: English

Fran the Man is a 2025 football mockumentary film directed by Stephen Bradley and starring Darragh Humphreys, Ardal O'Hanlon and Amy Huberman.

== Premise ==
A non-league football side are drawn against Irish giants Shamrock Rovers in the first round of the FAI Cup.

== Cast ==
- Darragh Humphreys as Fran Costello
- Ardal O'Hanlon as Jim O'Dea
- Amy Huberman as Jackie Charlton
- Risteárd Cooper as Gerry Nolan
- Toni O'Rourke as Detective Naomi Clancy
- Deirdre O'Kane as Dympna Greene
- Paul Reid as Dale
- Eddie Marsan
- Darren Dixon
- Baz Black as Hector Kelly

== Production ==
Written by Richie Conroy and directed by Stephen Bradley, the film is based on the football mockumentary series Fran which ran between 2009 and 2011 on Setanta Sports and TV3 in Ireland. Support comes from Screen Ireland and RTÉ. The film is produced by Collie McCarthy and Forty Foot Pictures.

The cast has Darragh Humphreys reprising the role of Fran Costello and includes Ardal O'Hanlan, Toni O’Rourke, Amy Huberman and Deirdre O’Kane.

Principal photography began in Dublin in March 2024.

== Reception ==
Fran the Man received poor reviews, with both The Guardian and Irish Independent scoring it 2/5. On RTÉ.ie, Harry Guerin gave it 3/5, saying "Like many a beloved show before it, Fran the Man struggles at times to keep the laughs going over a feature-length duration. There's no doubt director Stephen Bradley and writer Richie Conroy have some good gags; they just needed more of them to get the most out of a fine cast. That said, it can't be overstated how great Humphreys is as Fran - a gifted actor who deserves the chance to play different roles in the future."
