= Deirdre O'Kane =

Irish actor and comedian (born 1968)

- Born: 25 March 1968 (age 58); Drogheda, County Louth, Ireland
- Education: Loreto Abbey, Rathfarnham, Dublin
- Occupations: Comedian, actress
- Years active: 1993–present
- Spouse: Stephen Bradley
- Children: 2 - 1 daughter (Holly), 1 son (Daniel)
- Awards: 1 IFTA
- Website: deirdreokane.net

Deirdre O'Kane (/ˈdiːrdrə oʊˈkeɪn/; born 25 March 1968) is an Irish stand-up comedian and actress.

== Biography ==
Originally from Drogheda, County Louth, O'Kane is married to writer and director Stephen Bradley; they have two children. She attended Loreto High School Beaufort, an all-girls Catholic secondary school in Rathfarnham, Dublin.

== Career ==
=== Stand-up comic ===
O'Kane became a stand-up comic in 1996 and got into the finals of the BBC New Comedy Awards of that year. She has played at the Edinburgh Festival every year since, including 2001 where she not only performed her own solo show, Deirdre O'Kane is Crystallized, but also the two-hander Tis Pity She's Anonymous. She has also played The Melbourne, Adelaide and Kilkenny Cat Laughs Festivals and has toured the Middle East, Hong Kong, Shanghai, Prague, Brussels and London.

=== Theatre ===
O'Kane began her career as an actress and has played every major theatre in Ireland as well as touring in Australia, Canada and the UK. Leading roles include Mary in Juno and the Paycock (National Theatre), Miss Funny in At the Black Pig's Dyke (Druid Theatre Co.) and Daphne in Present Laughter (Gate Theatre).

=== Movies ===
She portrayed the role of Noeleen in the 2003 motion picture Intermission, directed by John Crowley. She played the lead role in the 2014 biopic Noble as Christina Noble, a children's rights campaigner, charity worker and writer, who founded the Christina Noble Children's Foundation in 1989.

=== Television ===
Television credits include hosting the ten-part TV series of stand-up comedy and sketches called The Lounge (RTÉ) which included guests such as Rich Hall, Adam Hills, Jeff Green and Dara Ó Briain. She also played the role of Fiona in Owen O'Neill's sit-com The Fitz (BBC).

In 2001, O'Kane (described in The Sunday Times as "absolutely superb") played the leading role of Helen in Paths to Freedom, a six-part spoof-documentary for RTÉ/BBC Choice and starred in the RTÉ comedy series Fergus's Wedding.

In 2012, she took on the part of Debra Moone, in Sky's comedy Moone Boy.

In 2016, she made a guest appearance on the British TV show As Yet Untitled and told an anecdote about her car being double clamped by over-efficient clampers to whom she was rude over the phone. Alan Davies liked her stories enough to consider naming the episode after one of her quotes: "Would you ever fuck off?".

O'Kane is one of the narrators of the Irish version of Gogglebox, alongside Rory Cowan, which started in 2016 on TV3. In 2018, she was a runner-up on the second series of the Irish version of Dancing With The Stars.

In Series 3 of Bridget & Eamon (2016-2019), Deirdre O'Kane arrives as Bridget's Mother with her new Turkish boyfriend - who is 32 years younger than herself, - planning to rewrite her will and leave everything to him.

In October 2021, The Deirdre O'Kane Show launched on Sky Max. The five-part series features Bill Bailey, Ardal O’Hanlon, Joanne McNally, Jason Byrne, Reginald D. Hunter, Neil Delamere, Emma Doran, Des Bishop, Catherine Bohart and Martin Angolo. Hip-hop comedian Rob Broderick, a.k.a. Abandoman, also features on the show.

In September 2021, she became a judge on the Irish talent show The Big Deal along with Boy George, Jedward, Lyra, and Aston Merrygold.

In 2024, O'Kane was a contestant on LOL: Last one Laughing Ireland, the Irish version of Japanese comedy-reality show Documental, where "Ten of Ireland's comedy stars try to make each other laugh." She ended up getting into the final but lost to Jason Byrne.

In 2025, she appeared in Chris O'Dowd's Small Town: Big Story as Carol from Casting.

In 2026, O'Kane appeared in BBC Studios and BocPix's 'Shedites' as Orla Naughton, the local councillor/TD, who in the first episode sponsors the boys to build a new bike from recycled parts to try to win the local 'Santa Spin' race.

In 2026, she played Sister Patrick in Lisa McGee's How To Get To Heaven From Belfast

== Filmography ==
=== Film ===
Year	Title	Role	Notes
1989	Dick Frances: Twice Shy	Receptionist	
1997	The Break	Breen's Girlfriend	
1997	I Went Down	Tom French's wife	Uncredited
1999	With or Without You	Sarah	
2000	Saltwater	Maria Beneventi	
2003	The Actors	Stage Manager	
2003	Intermission	Noeleen	
2004	Rory O'Shea Was Here	Job Applicant	
2005	Boy Eats Girl	Grace	
2005	Festival	Frida Finucane	
2007	The Basket Case	Imelda Sweeney	
2011	Killing Bono	Marlene McCormick	
2012	Dollhouse	Mum	
2014	Noble	Christina Noble	
2015	The Messenger	Mum	
2017	Halal Daddy	Doreen Murphy	
2017	The Lodgers	Maura	
2022	Burn It All	Mother	Short
2025	Fran: The Man	Dympna Greene	

=== Music videos ===
Year	Title	Artist
2026	Irish Goodbye	Kneecap
