= Hunting Alice Bell =

British television series

- Genre: Mystery thriller
- Screenplay by: David Baddiel; Peter Bradshaw; Polly Buckle; Kate Verghese
- Directed by: Paul Walker
- Starring: Alexandra Roach; Amanda Abbington; Emily Barber; Toni O'Rourke; Christina Bennington; Rudi Dharmalingam; Ralf Little; Simon Pegg
- Music by: Daithí Ó Drónaí
- Country of origin: United Kingdom
- Original language: English
- No. of series: 1
- No. of episodes: 6

Production
- Executive producers: David Baddiel; Mike Benson; Peter Bradshaw; Polly Buckle; Jonathan Ford; Rachel Gesua; Will Stanley
- Producer: Tamryn Reinecke
- Running time: 46 minutes
- Production company: Clapperboard Studios

Original release
- Network: Channel 4
- Release: 11 November – 26 November 2026

Hunting Alice Bell is a British mystery thriller broadcast on Channel 4 from 11 November 2026, created by David Baddiel with Peter Bradshaw.

== Premise ==
Alice Bell is a former nurse, and also the lover, and accomplice, of a notorious anaesthetist serial killer. She is living in the United Kingdom under an assumed name and new identity. When, online, Fran Da Silva is accused of being Alice Bell, her happy family life implodes in a wave of mob hate. Then she discovers she’s not the only woman to suffer this fate.

== Cast ==
- Alexandra Roach as Fran
- Amanda Abbington as Julie
- Emily Barber as Vanessa
- Toni O'Rourke as Ros
- Christina Bennington as Charlotte
- Rudi Dharmalingam as Nick
- Ralf Little as Graham
- Simon Pegg as Jason
- Aiyana Bartlett as Violet
- Mason Dhokia as Jay
- Cathy Newman as herself
- Alastair Campbell as himself
- Rory Stewart as himself

== Production ==
The series is written by David Baddiel, Polly Buckle, Kate Verghese and Peter Bradshaw and was developed over many years. It is produced by Clapperboard Studios and commissioned by Channel 4. Paul Walker directed all six episodes and is produced by Tamryn Reinecke. Executive producers include Mike Benson and Rachel Gesua for Clapperboard Studios, as well as Baddiel, Bradshaw, Buckle, Jonathan Ford and Will Stapley.

The cast includes Alexandra Roach, Amanda Abbington, Emily Barber, Toni O'Rourke, Christina Bennington and Rudi Dharmalingam, as well as Aiyana Bartlett, Ralf Little, and Simon Pegg. Pegg was reportedly attracted to the series by his pre-existing friendship with Baddiel.

Filming took place in County Wicklow in Ireland in 2025, with filming locations including Bray. First-look images were released by Channel 4 in July 2026. The score for the series was composed by Daithí Ó Drónaí.

== Broadcast ==
The series broadcast on Channel 4 from 11 November 2026.

== Critical reception ==
Carol Midgley in The Times wrote that "the script, written by David Baddiel and Peter Bradshaw, the Guardian film critic, is sharp and thoughtful ... if you watch all six episodes (all are available), you will see that the plot is clever, frequently wrong-footing and surprising the viewer. It also delivers a cracking twist that’s worth sticking around for."

Fleurine Tideman in Stylist wrote: "Hunting Alice Bell is the best TV show I've seen in 2026. I'm not saying that in February either; the Christmas lights are already up, so it means something. Why is it so good? Because any of us could be Fran De Silva. Maybe some of us could be Alice Bell, the titular character."

James Walton in The Spectator wrote: "...the programme is best seen — and certainly most enjoyed — not as realism, but as a dark, rompy parable of online madness." He added: "...let yourself be swept along by a nicely twisty thriller with a large side-dish of contemporary issues."

Charlotte Ivers in The Sunday Times wrote that the programme "...becomes a genuinely quite gripping bit of TV drama".

Barbara Ellen in The Observer wrote that "...the climax is handled beautifully, elevating the mystery and sending it in an entirely different, more psychologically intense direcion."
