= Christina Noble =

Irish human rights charitable activist

Christina Noble OBE
- Born: 23 December 1944 (age 81); Dublin, Ireland
- Organization: Christina Noble Children's Foundation
- Known for: Founder of the Christina Noble Children's Foundation, Noble and helping children in the Vietnam War
- Children: 4
- Relatives: 4 siblings and a step-sister

Christina Noble OBE is an Irish children's rights campaigner, charity worker and writer, who founded the Christina Noble Children's Foundation in 1989.

== Biography ==
Noble was born on 23 December 1944, in The Liberties section of Dublin, Ireland. Her mother died when she was ten. She was sent to an orphanage and dishonestly told that her three siblings were dead. She escaped and lived rough in Dublin, where she was gang-raped, which left her pregnant. Her baby son was adopted, against her will. After discovering the state had lied about the death of her siblings, Noble located her brother in England and moved there to live with him after she reached 18. This is where she met and married her husband and had three children. She was a victim of domestic violence.

In 1989, after her own children became adults, she visited Vietnam and began to care for homeless children. This action was inspired by a recurring dream she had during the Vietnam War. This eventually led her to create the Christina Noble Children's Foundation. To date, she and the Foundation have helped over 700,000 children in Vietnam and Mongolia.

== In film, TV, and radio productions ==
She was the subject of the Gum Leaf Production in association with December Films documentary "Mama Tina" made in 1997.

She appeared as a castaway on the BBC Radio programme Desert Island Discs on 15 June 1997.

She was the subject of the British TV series This Is Your Life in 2002 when she was surprised by Michael Aspel at a fundraising fashion show and auction in central London.

Noble was the subject of a 2014 documentary, In A House that Ceased to Be. It charts her reunion with her remaining siblings after fifty-three years, one brother and two sisters, from whom she had been separated as a child.

The 2014 feature film about her life, Noble, was directed by Stephen Bradley. In an interview for the film with The Irish Times she said, "I loved God and Jesus so much. I still do."

== Awards ==
Despite being from Ireland, she was made an Officer of the Order of the British Empire (OBE).

She is a recipient of the 2014 Women of the Year Prudential Lifetime Achievement Award.

== Bibliography ==
- —— (1994). Nobody's Child. Grove. ISBN 978-0802115515.
- —— (1994). Bridge Across My Sorrows. John Murray. ISBN 978-0719553615.
- —— (1998). Mama Tina. John Murray. ISBN 978-0719556357.
