= Irish Film Classification Office =

Irish censorship and classification within Ireland

Irish Film Classification Office Oifig Aicmithe Scannán na hÉireann
- Formation: 1923; 103 years ago
- Headquarters: Dublin, Ireland
- Director of film classification: Dr. Ciaran Kissane
- Website: www.ifco.ie

The Irish Film Classification Office (IFCO) (Irish: Oifig Aicmithe Scannán na hÉireann, OASÉ) is the organisation responsible for films, television programmes, and some video game classification and censorship within Ireland. Where restrictions are placed by the IFCO, they are legally binding.

Prior to 21 July 2008, the office was branded as the Irish Film Censor's Office, and was previously known as simply the Film Censor's Office, or, in legal references, the office of the Official Censor of Films, which was the official title of the head of the office prior to that date. The head of the office is the Director of Film Classification.

== Background ==
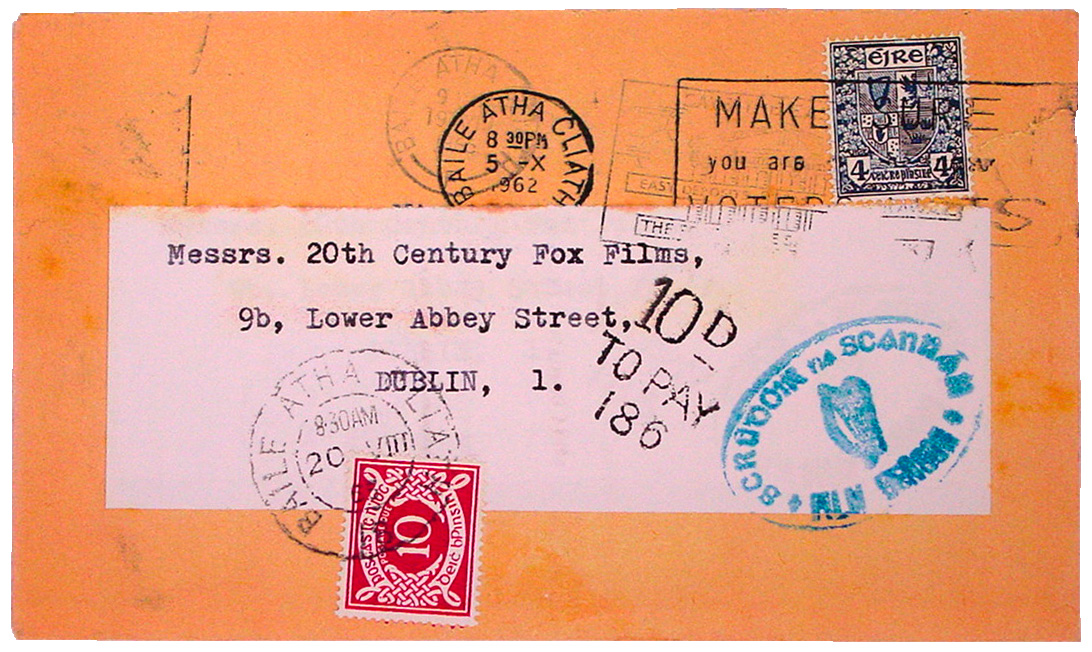
1965 envelope sent to local office of 20th Century Fox with certifying cachet of the Film Censor's Office

The Irish Film Censor's Office was set up in 1923, under the Censorship of Films Act 1923. This law was amended in 1925, 1930, 1970, and 1992; and a substantial revision of the law occurred in the Video Recordings Act, 1989 which extended the remit of the office to the regulation of the video importation and supply industry. On 21 July 2008 the Civil Law (Miscellaneous Provisions) Act 2008 came into force. Section 70 changes some of the provisions with regard censorship of films in the State. Section 71 renames the Film Censor as the Director of Film Classification and consequent to this, the Irish Film Censor's Office became the Irish Film Classification Office.

== Staff ==
The office consists of 21 staff members:

- Acting Director of Film Classification – George Sinclair
- Deputy Director – Vacant
- 10 Assistant Classifiers
- Office Manager
- 6 Civil Servants from the Department of Justice, Home Affairs and Migration
- 2 Projectionists

The 10 assistant classifiers are paid €168 per day and are entitled to claim expenses on top of this. According to a freedom of information request granted to the Irish edition of the Sunday Times the assistant classifiers claimed €306,683 in fees and €52,569 of expenses in 2007; €339,608 in fees and €49,898 of expenses in 2008; and €162,263 in fees and €21,401 of expenses for the first half of 2009. This equates to a payment of approximately €60 per film rated.

== Certificates ==
=== Introduction and early history ===
Before 1965, there were no certificates and all films were tailored for a general audience, resulting in several bans and cuts (no doubt also due to extremely conservative societal standards). As of 2004, 2,500 theatrical films had been banned and about 11,000 cut, largely from before the overhaul.

Public controversy over the office's harsh methods came to a head in late 1964 – in 1963 alone, 31 films were rejected and 156 were cut. Critically acclaimed hits were no exception – Dr. Strangelove was cut, including Ripper's reference to Communists trying to "sap and impurify all of our precious bodily fluids" with fluoridated water, and Irish-shot medical drama Of Human Bondage was banned due to the heroine dying of syphilis. Even after the ban was overturned the following year, it still received an over-18's certificate with cuts – nude sculptures made by Auguste Rodin were removed from the background of the title sequence.

In 1964, Brian Lenihan, the newly appointed Minister for Justice, met with the Cinema and Theatre Association in November to consider their views and even proposed to view recently banned films, including Of Human Bondage. On 28 November, Lenihan announced he'd be appointing a new Film Appeals Board and would be able to reform censorship without changing existing legislation – film correspondent Fergus Linehan pointed out that the 1923 Act explicitly supported age certification:

If the Official Censor is of opinion that any picture in respect of which an application is made to him under this section is not fit for general exhibition in public but is fit for exhibition in public in certain places in Saorstát Eireann or under special conditions or in the presence of certain classes of persons, he shall grant a certificate that such picture is fit for exhibition in public subject to such restrictions and conditions (which shall be expressed on the certificate) in regard to the places at which or the special conditions under which the picture may be exhibited or the classes of persons who may be admitted to an exhibition of the picture as in the opinion of the Official Censor are necessary to prevent the exhibition of the picture in public being subversive of public morality.

— Censorship of Films Act 1923, Section 7, Part 3

Lenihan announced the new Appeals board, which came into effect on 18 January 1965. Their main task was to begin enforcing limited certificates (alongside the general certificate). which were as follows, according to the Appeals Board chairman:

- Over 16
- Over 18
- Young persons under 12 years of age must be accompanied by an adult
- Educational

In addition, Over-21s certificates were awarded to four films, including Who's Afraid of Virginia Woolf?, Alfie, and Marat/Sade.

=== Cinematic certificates ===
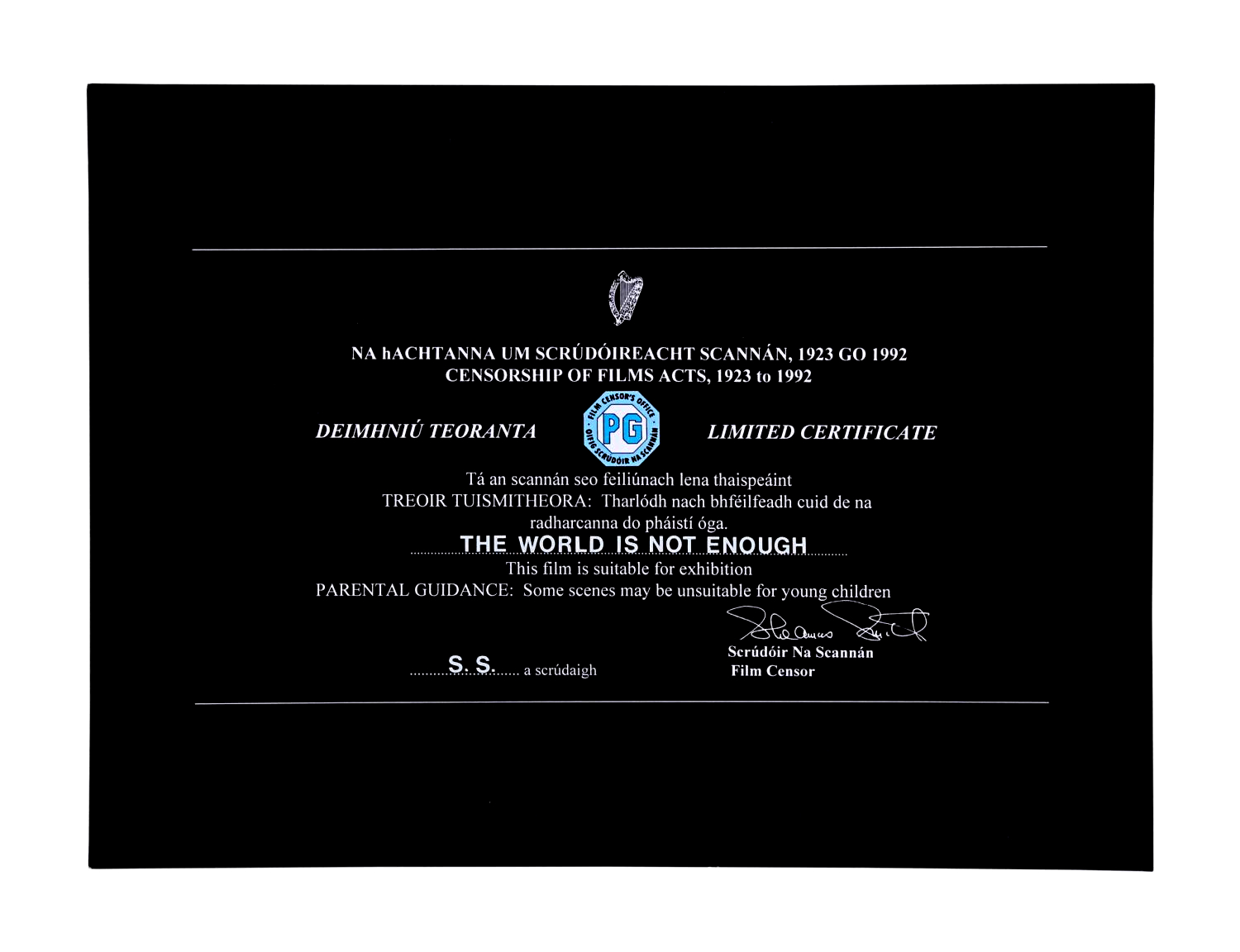
An official cinema certificate from 1999, which directly preceded the film.

The current cinematic certificates were announced in December 2004 at the European Conference of Film Classifiers in Paris and introduced on 1 January 2005. In November 2005, a public campaign was launched to raise awareness of them, including booklets, posters, stickers and an animated certificate produced by Brown Bag Films which drew attention to their relatively new website.

- G – General: Suitable for all
- PG – Parental Guidance: Suitable for children aged eight and older; parents are advised to accompany younger children.
- 12A – Minimum age for admission is 12, but younger children can be admitted if accompanied by an adult (12PG between 1 June 2001 – 1 January 2005).
- 15A – Minimum age for admission is 15, but younger children can be admitted if accompanied by an adult (15PG between 1 June 2001 – 1 January 2005).
- 16 – Minimum age for admission is 16; younger viewers will not be admitted under any circumstance (introduced on 1 January 2005).
- 18 – Minimum age for admission is 18; younger viewers will not be admitted under any circumstance.

=== Home video certificates ===
These were introduced on 1 September 1994:

- G – Fit for viewing by persons generally
- 12RA – Fit for viewing by persons generally, but in the case of a child under 12 years, only in the company of a responsible adult.
- 15 – Fit for viewing by persons aged 15 or more.
- 18 – Fit for viewing by persons aged 18 or more.

From that date it was an offence to trade uncertified videos, which carried fines of up to £1000 and a maximum sentence of three years. Additional rates came in at £180 per rental title, £80 per sale title and £20 per advert/trailer. This limited the market, especially for London distributors whose releases previously went to Ireland automatically.

In 1996, the 12RA certificate was officially replaced by PG and 12, although releases still used it into the 2000s.

The current certificates for home video formats such as DVD and Blu-ray that are issued are:

- G – General: Suitable for all
- PG – Suitable for general viewing, but parents are advised to watch with children younger than 12 years old.
- 12 – Suitable for people aged 12 and over, and not to be supplied to someone below that age.
- 15 – Suitable for people aged 15 and over, and not to be supplied to someone below that age.
- 18 – Suitable for people aged 18 and over, and not to be supplied to someone below that age.

A retired certificate only used on home video is:

- 12RA (no longer issued) Not suitable for people aged younger than 12 unless they view with an adult, and not to be supplied to someone below that age. The "RA" stands for "Responsible Adult". Retired around 2003 (officially replaced in 1996).

=== Standard cinematic-home video certification crossover ===
This is the crossover, or change, in a certificate that will happen when a film which has been shown in cinemas, is released on home video, but this only applies if:

- There is no extra material (bonuses, trailers, etc.) which is not appropriate to the main feature, and would cause it to receive a higher certificate.
- The film has not been edited (material taken out, etc.) in a way which would cause the main feature to receive a lower certificate.

The standard crossovers are as follows:

Cinema certificate	Home video certificate
G	G
PG	PG
12A	12
15A	15
16	15/18
18	18

Note: The certificate "12RA" did not have a corresponding cinematic certificate, and thus, did not have a standard crossover (certain 12A films received the certificate before it was withdrawn in the mid-2000s).

If the two rules above apply to a film's home video release, then, generally, it will be re-rated completely, but this does not mean certificates will always coincide for all formats, as occasionally (usually the DVD or Blu-ray) one edition will contain extra features while the other does not, causing one to be re-rated, and the other to take a Standard Crossover (for instance, a film which received a 15A certificate in cinemas may have received a 15 certificate on VHS but an 18 certificate on DVD; usually DVDs in these circumstances would carry a label on the reverse, informing viewers of this).

==== Home video ====
A censor's stamp on a 2004 DVD

Until February 2009, the home video certificates were always the certificate surrounded by an octagon, followed by the words "FILM CENSOR'S OFFICE" and "OIFIG SCRÚDÓIR NA SCANNÁN", which were then surrounded by another, larger, octagon. The colours were cyan and white, but the order they appear in varied. Although the Office was renamed in July 2008, these continued to bear the old name until February 2009, when they were altered to read "IRISH FILM CLASSIFICATION OFFICE" and its Irish equivalent.

=== Video games ===
Unlike the BBFC in the UK, which prior to PEGI ratings becoming legally enforceable in the UK on 30 July 2012 rated video games that met certain criteria (such as very graphic violence), the Irish Film Censor's Office does not usually rate video games, leaving ratings to PEGI, unless the game's content is deemed prohibitable under section 3 (1) of the Act.

IFCO ratings for video games were introduced in 2001 and retired in 2003. Although the Silent Hill Collection was released in 2006, it contained re-releases of the second and third games, which were rated and released in 2001 and 2003 respectively.

Only 9 games have ever been submitted to and rated by the IFCO:

Title	Year	Certificate
Metal Gear Solid 2: Sons of Liberty	2001	15
Silent Hill 2	2001	15
Grand Theft Auto: Vice City	2002	18
Mafia	2002	15
Metal Gear Solid 2: Substance	2002	15
Grand Theft Auto III (Xbox version)	2003	18
Rockstar Games Double Pack: Grand Theft Auto (inc. Grand Theft Auto III and Grand Theft Auto: Vice City)	2003	18
Manhunt	2003	18
Max Payne 2: The Fall of Max Payne	2003	15
Silent Hill 3	2003	18
The Silent Hill Collection (inc. Silent Hill 2 and Silent Hill 3)	2006	18 (overall)

Despite the lack of legally binding ratings, most (if not all) video game retailers attempt to prohibit the sale of PEGI 18+ rated games to people under the age of 18, and prior to PEGI ratings the same was done with BBFC 18 ratings on games (the same packaging is usually used in games sold in Ireland as in the UK).

The only prohibition notice for a video game was issued for Manhunt 2 in 2007.

== Appeals ==
All decisions made with regard to certification, may be appealed for up to 6 months after the certificate is initially issued. An appeal is issued to the Classification of Films Appeal Board.

Works may also be submitted for re-classification after seven years since the original certification have passed (not an appeal per se, but rather seen as an update of classification based on current standards).

A recent example of a (failed) appeal is The First Purge, which received an 18 certificate for strong bloody violence, sustained threat and disturbing scenes. The distributor (Universal Pictures) argued the case for a 16 certificate:

We would contend that the last two films in the franchise, in particular, are similar in tone and viscerality to the current film.^{A}

The First Purge is a thematic continuation of how a group of people must fight to survive a night of government-sanctioned mayhem. Similar to Anarchy and Election Year, The First Purge features intensely depicted violence and some gory imagery but has contextual justification. There are sustained scenes of threat in which the characters are terrorised by masked killers but the guidelines for a 16 classification on the IFCO suggest that strong horror and sustained threat may be acceptable in this category.

The violence is presented in an extremely stylised way in an equivalent manner to the earlier films in the franchise as well as similar titles like Atomic Blonde (16), John Wick (16) and John Wick: Chapter 2 (16).

— Direct correspondence between Universal Pictures and the IFCO

A. The Purge: Anarchy and The Purge: Election Year both received 16 certificates, for "frequent strong bloody violence, disturbing sequences, strong threat of sexual violence" and "strong bloody violence throughout" respectively. The distributor also mentioned the film's 15 certificate in the UK, which is consistent throughout the franchise.

After first being viewed on 15 June, it was re-viewed on 21 June when the Appeal Board stuck by the original decision.

Ger Connolly wrote back, explaining the decision in greater detail:

This is the fourth film of this particular franchise. As can sometimes be the case with long-running horror franchises, in evolution they become more violent and explicit to maintain the interest of their audience. This is, in my opinion, the case with The Purge series of films. The first instalment, essentially a 'home invasion' thriller, was classified 15A. The next two (The Purge: Anarchy and The Purge: Election Year) broadened out the story and intensified in terms of body count and the graphic way in which some of the violence was depicted. Both were classified 16 on cinema release. The Purge: Election Year was classified 18 on DVD release. In most cases films classified 16 theatrically are classified 15 on DVD release. This classification is more restrictive than 15A. In rarer cases the DVD classification is increased to 18 to reflect the level of content.

The First Purge intensifies the extremely graphic violence – the violence here is brutal and sustained. It also contained a scene of sexual assault as well as scenes of very overt brutal racist violence against African Americans with the attackers in full Ku Klux Klan regalia. These were not present in the other instalments.

I suggest that the context here is not sufficient to warrant a 16 classification due to the extremely brutal and frenzied acts of violence combined with racial hatred and that The First Purge is appropriately classified at 18.

— Ger Connolly, in direct correspondence with Universal Pictures

=== Previous appeals (excluding bans) ===
Year	Title	Original certificate	Content guidance/Details	Appeal results	Revised certificate	Current certificate
1989	The Karate Kid Part III	15	"Very, very violent" and "an evil influence for young audiences" according to head censor Sheamus Smith. A spokesperson for Columbia TriStar said, "The first two Karate Kid films had 'under 12' certificates here and the new one has similar certificates in Britain and America. The films are very popular with young audiences". The appeal viewing took place on 26 July and the decision, which was decided by a 4:1 ratio, pushed the release date back from mid-July to 4 August.	Upheld	Under 12's accompanied	PG (DVD)
1989	Ghostbusters II	Under 12's accompanied	Columbia Tri-Star requested a General certificate.	Failed		PG (DVD)
1990	Look Who's Talking	15	Smith objected to the opening, showing sperm swimming in a womb, followed by the mother disclosing an affair with her married boss and that she was artificially inseminated. The appeal viewing took place on 26 January.	Upheld	Under 12's accompanied	15 (DVD)
1990	Gremlins 2: The New Batch	15	Smith objected to the violence, including a gremlin being killed when pushed into a paper shredder.	Failed		12 (DVD)
1990	Rocky V	15	Smith objected to the "extreme violence" of the final street fight. UIP requested an Under 12's accompanied certificate and the decision was made unanimously.	Failed		15 (DVD)
1991	Thelma & Louise	18	Due to "frequent violence".	Failed		15 (DVD)
1991	Dead Again	18		Upheld	15	18 (DVD)
1991	Toy Soldiers	18	Viewed twice by the Appeal Board.	Upheld	15	15 (DVD)
1991	Boyz n the Hood	18		Failed		18 (DVD)
1992	Wayne's World	15	Smith released this teen comedy with a 15 certificate for strong language. At the time, the new Appeals Board hadn't been appointed, but it was submitted for review as soon as the new members of the Board took their jobs. The appeal viewing took place on 23 March.	Upheld	Under 12's accompanied	PG (DVD)
1992	Far and Away	15	The appeal viewing took place on 13 July.	Failed		15 (DVD)
1994	Heaven & Earth	18	After the uncut version received an 18 certificate, Warner Bros. submitted the cut British version, and although Smith initially gave it an 18 too, his decision was overturned. The appeal viewing took place on 16 February. The British version was cut by 55s to reduce scenes of torture and sexual violence involving a female prisoner, which "left the emphasis on the tragic implications rather than the infliction of pain and degradation", and lowered the certificate from 18 to 15.	Upheld	15	18 (DVD)
1994	Blown Away	18	Due to violence. The appeal viewing took place on 10 August.	Failed		18 (DVD)
1996	Independence Day	15	The appeal viewing took place on 12 November, for video/DVD.	Upheld	PG	12A (cinema)
1996	The Secret Agent Club	15	The appeal viewing took place on 12 November, for video/DVD.	Upheld	12	
1996	Some Mother's Son	18		Upheld	15	15 (DVD)
1997	She's the One	18	The appeal viewing took place on 4 July, for video/DVD.	Upheld	15	
1998	The Lost World: Jurassic Park	12	The appeal viewing took place on 22 January, for video/DVD.	Failed		
1999	Wild Wild West	15		Upheld	12	12 (DVD)
2004	Closer	18	Intense, explicit sexual dialogue, strong language, mild nudity. John Kelleher wrote a letter to the Appeals Board chairman, detailing his reasoning: "Closer deals uncompromisingly, often very explicitly, with the darker side of adult sexual relationships, notably betrayal and the corrosive effect of sexual jealousy. In my opinion, the film's emotional intensity and very explicit dialogue make it suitable for a mature adult, rather than an adolescent, audience."	Failed		18 (cinema and DVD)
2007	The Hitcher	18	Sustained intense bloody and graphic violence. The uncut version was submitted at first, and received an 18 certificate. After minor cuts were made for a British 15, this edited version again received an Irish 18, which is what was lowered by the Appeals Board.	Upheld	16	16 (cinema) 18 (DVD)
2008	The Chronicles of Narnia: Prince Caspian	12A	Sustained battle sequences, with killing and injury, which while not gory, may still upset younger viewers.	Upheld	PG	PG (cinema and DVD)
2008	Inkheart	12A	Moderate threat/frights and scary fantasy violence, some of which may disturb younger children.	Failed		12A (cinema) 12 (DVD)
2009	Watchmen	18	Strong, visceral hyper-realistic violence, including one brutal sexual assault. Appeals Board member David Pierpoint commented on the decision: "(It) was in a fantasy genre and the violence wasn't, to my mind, realistic. I personally had no concerns about it."	Upheld	16	16 (cinema) 18 (DVD)
2009	Orphan	18	Disturbing theme and content, depicted with underlying menace. Strong, gory horror violence.	Upheld	16	16 (cinema) 18 (DVD)
2009	Law Abiding Citizen	18	Vengeance thriller with strong, brutal, sadistic, bloody violence.	Upheld	16	16 (cinema) 18 (DVD)
2009	The Lovely Bones	15A	Child abduction and murder. Strong scenes of violence and its aftermath.	Upheld	12A	12A (cinema) 12 (DVD)
2010	The Hole	15A	Horror involved with confronting fear.	Failed		15A (cinema) 15 (DVD)
2012	ParaNorman	12A	Frequent moderate frightening scenes.	Upheld	PG	PG (cinema and DVD)
2012	Lawless	18	Brutal gory violence.	Upheld	16	16 (cinema) 18 (DVD)
2012	Taken 2	15A	Sustained strong violence and sequences of intense threat.	Upheld	12A	12A (cinema) 12 (DVD)
2013	Safe Haven	15A	Scenes of strong spousal violence. Brief moderate sex scene.	Upheld	12A	12A (cinema) 12 (DVD)
2017	Free Fire	18	Relentless bloody violence. Strong drugs use.	Failed		18 (cinema and DVD)
2018	The First Purge	18	Strong bloody violence, sustained threat and disturbing scenes.	Failed		18 (cinema and DVD)
2018	Bumblebee	12A	Moderate violence.	Failed		12A (cinema) 12 (DVD)
2019	Mid90s	18	Strong drugs use. Disturbing scenes and situations. Strong sex references.	Upheld	16	16 (cinema) [DVD not submitted]
2019	Downton Abbey	12A	Brief homophobic reference.	Upheld	PG	PG (cinema and DVD)

== Refusals and bans ==
Films may be refused a certificate, e.g. on grounds of obscenity. Such films may not be shown in public cinemas or sold in shops, but are not ipso facto banned and have been shown at film festivals and art house clubs such as the Irish Film Theatre and Irish Film Institute. These may also show films which have not been submitted for certification, as the submission fee may be prohibitive if a film is screened only a few times at a small venue.

Prohibitions and revocations, with justification, are listed in the official gazette, Iris Oifigiúil, under the headings of PROHIBITION ORDER and REVOCATION ORDER.

Despite the recommendations in the 2000 review of certification that no further films be banned, bans are still occasionally issued, although usually overturned on appeal. Boy Eats Girl, a 2005 movie, was initially banned, with the option of a cut being provided to the producers. On appeal, the film was passed uncut, and granted a 15A rating, although the video certificate was raised to 18.

Movies which are never submitted for cinema release in Ireland are occasionally banned on attempted video releases, although only one such order was made in 2004, banning the pornographic Anabolic Initiations 5, with the appeals board upholding the censor's order. One order was issued in 2005, reiterating the ban on Deep Throat. The only order in 2006 banned the pornographic film Steal Runaway.

For a comprehensive list of banned films, see Film censorship in the Republic of Ireland#Notable banned or cut films

== Criticism ==
Like many systems of entertainment classification, the IFCO has received criticism for several decisions they have made in the past. The board has been described as too zealous and conservative. Many titles that receive 15 certificates from the BBFC are rated 18 by the IFCO. DVD examples include Kick-Ass and Black Swan. Rarer cinema examples (which bypass the 16 rating) include Free Fire and You Were Never Really Here.

However, the IFCO are more lenient with strong language than the BBFC are, especially with very strong language (e.g. 'cunt'). Examples include Frost/Nixon and The Visitor receiving 15 certificates in the UK but PG's in Ireland despite the use of the stronger term 'motherfucker', and Gone Girl receiving an 18 in the UK but a 15 (on video) in Ireland despite four aggressive uses of 'cunt'. The 2014 documentary Red Army received a 15 in the UK but a 12A in Ireland for a single use of 'cocksucker' (although the video rating was upgraded to 15).

Three titles in particular drew criticism of the board: Election, But I'm a Cheerleader and Brokeback Mountain. All three were rated 18 in Ireland and 15 in the UK, although Brokeback Mountain was rated 16 for cinema release because the system is different than for video releases (it was only an 18 on video) – But I'm a Cheerleader was re-rated 15 in 2021.

The IFCO is established on a statutory basis and thus the appeals procedure is final. Where a film or video game is banned, there can be no further appeal, but the work may be resubmitted after seven years.

== See also ==
- British Board of Film Classification – the equivalent body to the IFCO in the United Kingdom
- Censorship in the Republic of Ireland
- Film censorship in the Republic of Ireland
- Television content rating systems

== Sources ==
- McKittrick, David (6 March 2008). "Confessions of an Irish censor: why Clark Gable, 'Casablanca' and Cliff got the chop". The Independent.
- Rockett, Kevin (2004). Irish film censorship: a cultural journey from silent cinema to internet pornography. Dublin: Four Courts Press. ISBN 1-85182-844-3.
