= My Generation (2017 film) =

- Film poster
- Directed by: David Batty
- Written by: Dick Clement; Ian La Frenais
- Produced by: Simon Fuller; Michael Caine; Dick Clement; Ian La Frenais; Fodhla Cronin O'Reilly
- Starring: Michael Caine; David Bailey; Roger Daltrey; Marianne Faithfull; Paul McCartney; Mary Quant; Twiggy
- Cinematography: Ben Hodgson
- Edited by: Ben Hilton
- Production companies: XIX Entertainment; IM Global; Raymi Films; Ingenious Media
- Distributed by: Lionsgate
- Release dates: 5 September 2017 (Venice); 16 March 2018
- Running time: 85 minutes
- Country: United Kingdom
- Language: English

My Generation is a 2017 documentary film directed by David Batty and presented by Michael Caine. It follows the cultural revolution that occurred in 1960s England and interviews various icons and key figures such as David Bailey, Roger Daltrey, Marianne Faithfull, Paul McCartney, Mary Quant and Twiggy. The film contains an abundance of archive footage and its soundtrack contains the 1965 song of the same name by The Who.
