= Rudi Dharmalingam =

Indian-British actor

- Born: 11 May 1981 (age 45); Maidstone, Kent, England
- Education: University of Salford (BA)
- Occupation: Actor
- Years active: 1998–present
- Height: 170 cm (5 ft 7 in)

Rudi Dharmalingam (born 11 May 1981), is an English actor of theatre and television.

== Early life and education ==
Rudi Dharmalingam was born in Maidstone, Kent, of Indo-Trinidadian and Sri Lankan heritage. After joining the National Youth Theatre in 1998, he obtained a BA in performing arts at the University of Salford in 2002.

== Career ==
Dharmalingam's notable television portrayals include Tariq Mistry in the Channel 4 soap opera Hollyoaks (2010), James Cutler in the BBC One legal drama The Split (2018–2022), Nik Katira in the Australian psychological mystery Wakefield (2021). He has appeared in numerous theatre productions, including Broadway's The History Boys (2006) and West End's Hamlet (2015).

Dharmalingam's minor TV roles include programs such as The Bill, New Tricks, Coronation Street, Casualty, Doctor Who, Rellik, Electric Dreams and Our Girl.

== Filmography ==
=== Film ===
Year	Title	Role	Notes	Ref,
2015	National Theatre Live: Hamlet	Guildenstern		
2016	Fantastic Beasts and Where to Find Them	Ranjit	Uncredited	
2019	In the Shadow of the Moon	Naveen Rao		
2020	National Theatre Live: Dara	Murad / Danishmand	Direct-to-video	
2024	Role Play	Rajendra 'Raj' Bakshi		
TBA	The Collaborator	Captain Kadian	Post-production	
TBA	Control	TBA	Filming	

=== Television ===
Year	Title	Role	Notes	Ref.
2003	Cutting It	Barman	2 episodes	
2007	The Bill	Sabal Chaudhari	Episode: "Match Day Violence"	
2007	Britz	Returned Fighter	Television film	
2010	Casualty	Khalid Koser	Episode: "Only the Lonely"	
2010	Hollyoaks	Tariq	5 episodes	
2010	New Tricks	Arun Kumar	Episode: "Dark Chocolate"	
2011	Coronation Street	Faz	2 episodes	
2012	Doctor Who	ISA Worker	Episode: "Dinosaurs on a Spaceship"	
2014	Casualty	Amil Reddy	Episode: "The Dying Game"	
2017	Rellik	Alex	Miniseries; 2 episodes	
2017	Electric Dreams	Bob Paine	Episode: "The Commuter"	
2017	Our Girl	Milan	3 episodes	
2018	The Split	James Cutler	13 episodes	
2019	Strike Back: Revolution	Gopan	2 episodes	
2019	Dark Money	Dominic Nadesan	Miniseries; 4 episodes	
2020	Tin Star	Jyotiranjan 'Joe' Clarke	3 episodes	
2020	On the Edge	Rev	Episode: "For You"	
2021	Wakefield	Nik Katira	8 episodes	
2022	The Lazarus Project	Shiv Reddy	11 episodes	
2023	The Cleaner	Him	Episode: "The Dead End"	
2023	Great Expectations	John Wemmick	6 episodes	
2025	Missing You	Rishi Magari	5 episodes	
2025	Playing Gracie Darling	Jay	6 episodes	
2026	Hunting Alice Bell	Nick	Mini series	
