= Noble (film) =

- Promotional poster
- Directed by: Stephen Bradley
- Produced by: Melanie Gore-Grimes; Stephen Bradley
- Starring: Deirdre O'Kane; Sarah Greene; Brendan Coyle; Liam Cunningham; Ruth Negga; Nhu Quynh Nguyen; Mark Huberman; Kinh Quoc Nguyen; Lu'o Ng My; Gloria Cramer Curtis
- Cinematography: Trevor Forrest
- Music by: Ben Foster; Giles Martin
- Production company: Destiny Films
- Release date: 31 January 2014 (SBIFF)
- Running time: 100 minutes
- Countries: Ireland; Vietnam; United Kingdom
- Languages: English; Vietnamese

Noble is a 2014 film written and directed by Stephen Bradley about the true life story of Christina Noble, a children's rights campaigner, charity worker and writer, who founded the Christina Noble Children's Foundation in 1989. It stars Deirdre O'Kane, Sarah Greene, Brendan Coyle, Mark Huberman and Ruth Negga.

== Plot ==
The film is set in Vietnam in 1989, fourteen years after the end of the war. Christina Noble flies into Ho Chi Minh City (formerly Saigon), a country "that she wouldn't be able to show you on a map". With a few dollars, her own hard-won courage, she is about embark on a life calling. The film explores her tough upbringing in Dublin and her early adult life in the UK. It is the inspirational true story of a woman who believes that it only takes one person to make a difference.

== Cast ==
- Deirdre O'Kane as Christina Noble
- Sarah Greene as Middle Christina
- Gloria Cramer Curtis as Young Christina
- Brendan Coyle as Gerry Shaw
- Mark Huberman as David Somers
- Nhu Quynh Nguyen as Madame Linh
- Ruth Negga as Joan
- David Mumeni as Mario
- Liam Cunningham as Thomas
- Kinh Quoc Nguyen as Trung
- Pauline McLynn as Mother Superior
- Eva Birthistle as Sister Laura
- Paul Hickey as Father O'Leary
- Matt Sipprell as European Investor

== Production ==
Production began in Vietnam in January 2013 and finished in the United Kingdom. Post-production took place in London.

== Release ==
Noble premiered at the Santa Barbara International Film Festival on 31 January 2014, and it opened theatrically in Ireland on 19 September 2014.

== Reception ==
On review aggregator website Rotten Tomatoes, the film holds an approval rating of 81% based on 32 reviews, and an average rating of 6.5/10. The website's critical consensus reads, "Noble is undeniably and impassioned, even if it sometimes goes overboard in trying to prove its real-life protagonist lives up to its title." On Metacritic, the film has a weighted average score of 63 out of 100, based on 8 critics, indicating "generally favorable reviews". Donald Clarke of The Irish Times rated it 3/5 stars and wrote, "Fuelled by excellent performances, Noble has an uncomplicated integrity to it that will warm even the most resistant heart." Justin Lowe of The Hollywood Reporter called it "a joyful and rousing affirmation of the human spirit".

=== Awards ===
Year	Organization	Award	Result	Ref
2014	Boston Irish Film Festival	Best Feature	Won	
2014	Dallas International Film Festival	Audience Award	Won	
2014	Newport Film Festival	Best Foreign Film	Won	
2014	San Diego Film Festival	Best International Film	Won	
2014	Santa Barbara International Film Festival	Panavision Spirit Award for Independent Cinema	Won	
