= Mark Huberman =

Irish actor (born 1981)

- Occupation: Actor
- Years active: 2000–2020

Mark Huberman (born 1978) is an Irish actor.

== Early life ==
Mark Huberman grew up in Cabinteely, south Dublin. His father Harold was born in London to a Jewish family; his mother Sandra is from County Wexford. His sister, Amy Huberman, is an actress.

== Career ==
He is an actor known for his performances on TV and in film.

== Filmography ==
Year	Title	Role	Note
2000	Borstal Boy	Mac	Film
2001	Band of Brothers	Lester 'Leo' Hashey	Mini Series
2003	Bloom	Haines	Film
2004	Starfish	Jack	Film
2005	Boy Eats Girl	Samson	Film
2005	Pure Mule	Conor	TV series
2005	Never Judge A Book	Paramedic	Short
2007	Sherlock Holmes and the Baker Street Irregulars	Policeman	Film
2007	The Garden of Ireland	Dave	Short
2007	The Running Mate	Leiritheoir	TV series
2007	Comedy Showcase	Rory McWilliams	TV series
2008	My Boy Jack	Dying Soldier	Film
2008	Shapes	Will	Short
2005 - 2008	The Clinic	Kieran Miller	TV series
2008	School Run	Ray Madden	TV series
2009	The Good Doctor	Alexander	Short
2009	The Take	Harry	TV series
2009	Val Falvey TD	Fionnbar	TV series
2009	Mattie	Ross Burke	TV series
2010	The Alarms: A Story in the Woods	Greg	
2010	When Harvey Met Bob	David Hepworth	Film
2011	Hidden	Gate Officer	TV series
2011	Neverland	Copper 2	Mini Series
2012	Shadow Dancer	RUC Officer	Film
2012	Vexed	Ryan	TV series
2012	Moone Boy	Mike	TV series
2013	Foyle's War	MI5 Guard	TV series
2013	Dark Touch	Joseph	
2013	Ice Cream Girls	PC Jack Bason	Mini Series
2013	The Sea	Jerome	Film
2013	The Mario Rosenstock Show	Various	TV series
2014	The First Wave	Dad	Short
2014	Frank	Management Guru	Film
2014	Noble	David Somers	Film
2020	The Turning	Bert	Film
