= The Boy That Never Was =

Irish television series

- Genre: Drama
- Based on: The Boy That Never Was by Karen Perry
- Screenplay by: Jo Spain; David Logan
- Directed by: Hannah Quinn
- Starring: Colin Morgan; Toni O'Rourke
- Country of origin: Ireland
- Original language: English
- No. of series: 1
- No. of episodes: 4

Production
- Executive producers: Aoife O’Sullivan; Tristan Orpen Lynch; Andrew Byrne; David Crean; Dermot Horan
- Production companies: Subotica; Screen Ireland

Original release
- Network: RTÉ
- Release: 1 September – 22 September 2024

The Boy That Never Was is an Irish television drama series directed by Hannah Quinn and starring Colin Morgan and Toni O'Rourke. It is based on the novel of the same name by Karen Perry, adapted by Jo Spain. The series was broadcast on RTÉ Television from 1 September 2024.

== Premise ==
A man becomes convinced that he has seen his son on the streets of Dublin, three years after he was supposedly killed in a North African earthquake.

== Cast ==
- Colin Morgan as Harry Lonergan
- Toni O'Rourke as Robin Lonergan
- Kerr Logan as Ollie
- Mansour Badri as Fadoul Kadiri
- Simon Callow as Cozimo
- Kelly Campbell as Eva Doyle
- Cillian O'Sullivan as Dave Garrick

== Production ==
The series was commissioned by Irish broadcaster RTÉ with support from Screen Ireland. It is produced by Subotica, who oversaw the adaptation by Jo Spain and David Logan of the Karen Perry novel of the same name. It is directed by Hannah Quinn. Executive producers on the series included Aoife O’Sullivan and Tristan Orpen Lynch for Subotica, with David Crean and Dermot Horan for RTÉ and Andrew Byrne for Screen Ireland. The cast includes Colin Morgan, Toni O’Rourke, Kerr Logan and Simon Callow.

Filming took place on location in Ireland and Morocco.

== Broadcast ==
As of January 2024, Screen Ireland suggested that the four-part series would be released in 2024. It was broadcast on RTÉ Television in September 2024 and also became available to stream on RTÉ's streaming service.

== Reception ==
Ed Power in The Irish Times said that despite an intriguing premise the series adaptation failed in its attempt to be a decent potboiler.

Pat Stacey for the Irish Independent said that the series was "outstanding” and that Colin Morgan and Toni O’Rourke are "excellent” as the central married couple overcoming loss and are "utterly believable in a drama that…toggles between two timelines, works as both a gripping psychological thriller and a harrowing study of grief, guilt, remorse and unravelling mental health".
