= God's Creatures (film) =

2022 film by Saela Davis and Anna Rose Holmer

- Theatrical release poster
- Directed by: Saela Davis; Anna Rose Holmer
- Screenplay by: Shane Crowley
- Story by: Fodhla Cronin O'Reilly; Shane Crowley
- Produced by: Fodhla Cronin O'Reilly
- Starring: Emily Watson; Paul Mescal; Aisling Franciosi; Declan Conlon; Toni O'Rourke; Marion O'Dwyer; Brendan McCormack; Lalor Roddy
- Cinematography: Chayse Irvin
- Edited by: Jeanne Applegate; Julia Bloch
- Music by: Danny Bensi; Saunder Jurriaans
- Production companies: A24; BBC Film; Screen Ireland; The Wrap Fund; Nine Daughters
- Distributed by: BFI Distribution (United Kingdom); Volta Pictures (Ireland); A24 (Worldwide)
- Release dates: 19 May 2022 (Cannes); 30 September 2022 (United States); 23 March 2023 (Ireland); 31 March 2023 (United Kingdom)
- Running time: 101 minutes
- Countries: United Kingdom; Ireland
- Language: English
- Box office: $297,597

God's Creatures is a 2022 psychological drama film directed by Saela Davis and Anna Rose Holmer with the screenplay written by Shane Crowley, based on a story he wrote with producer Fodhla Cronin O'Reilly. It stars Emily Watson, Paul Mescal, Aisling Franciosi, Declan Conlon, Toni O'Rourke, Marion O'Dwyer, Brendan McCormack, and Lalor Roddy. The film premiered at Directors' Fortnight of the Cannes Film Festival on 19 May 2022.

== Plot ==
In a small remote Irish fishing village, Aileen (Watson) works as a shift manager at the local seafood processing plant alongside Mary (O'Dwyer), whose son Mark recently drowned at sea, and Sarah (Franciosi), a young woman experiencing marital troubles with her husband Francie (McCormack). At Mark's funeral reception, Aileen's estranged son Brian (Mescal) unexpectedly returns after a lengthy and unexplained move to Australia. While initially caught off-guard, Aileen is delighted to reunite her family together alongside husband Con (Conlon), daughter Erin (O'Rourke) with her newborn son, and elderly father-in-law Paddy (Roddy) who is in a vegetative state.

Brian remains vague about Australia, but expresses his intention to restart the family oyster trapping farm that was abandoned after his departure. Since Brian has no money or resources of his own, Aileen steals bags of oysters from the plant to seed his traps, which is witnessed by Sarah. The next day, local seafood supplier Francie is irate over missing oysters from his order. Aileen blames a lower worker, and finds Sarah heartbroken about her decision to separate from Francie.

At home, Con confronts Brian about stealing fish from others' traps and selling them himself. Brian storms off and later begins working for another fisherman. Aileen and Brian visit the local pub, where they notice Sarah arrive alone. Brian attempts to rekindle a former romantic relationship they shared in their teenage years, and Aileen returns home by herself.

The following day, fungus is discovered on the oysters at the processing plant and a moratorium is declared, devastating the community. Amidst the announcement, an already distressed Sarah faints unexpectedly. Aileen receives a call from the police stating that a sexual assault claim has been filed against Brian, who claims that he was at home with his mother the night of their bar outing. She lies to the officer confirming his alibi, and does not question Brian when they drive back home. Sarah goes missing from her shifts.

Erin visits Sarah, who confesses the events of the sexual assault following the bar encounter. Her story begins to leak around town, namely with the factory coworkers. Aileen, Brian, and Sarah are summoned to court, where Aileen testifies once more that she was home with Brian during the incident. The court throws out the case due to lack of physical evidence, much to the dismay of Sarah. When Sarah returns back to the processing plant, she is let go due to her repeated absences. On her way out she alludes to Aileen being the cause of Francie's missing oysters, and Aileen is sent home. At work, the coworkers begin to avoid Aileen, while in the village, Sarah is ostracized by the men.

As Aileen becomes haunted by the guilt from her actions, Paddy suddenly dies in his sleep. At the wake, Sarah makes an appearance and spits at Brian. Aileen stops Brian from retaliating. During the reception, an unaffected Brian is seen flirting with a younger girl, Emma, and Aileen steps in. Brian loses his temper, and a physical scuffle ensues between him and Con.

Following their fight, Brian sets out to the family's oyster plots accompanied by Aileen, who finally confronts him about his assault against Sarah. Brian dismisses her. Noticing the rising tide, Aileen returns back to the boat while the waves quickly overwhelm Brian, who drowns.

Afterwards, Aileen tells Sarah to stay in the village. Sarah decides that there is too much negative history plaguing her in the town, and drives off ready to start a new life.

== Cast ==
- Emily Watson as Aileen O'Hara
- Paul Mescal as Brian O'Hara
- Aisling Franciosi as Sarah Murphy
- Declan Conlon as Con O'Hara
- Toni O'Rourke as Erin O'Hara
- Marion O'Dwyer as Marry Fitz
- Brendan McCormack as Francie D'Arcey
- Lalor Roddy as Paddy O'Hara
- Isabelle Connolly as Emma Daly

== Production ==
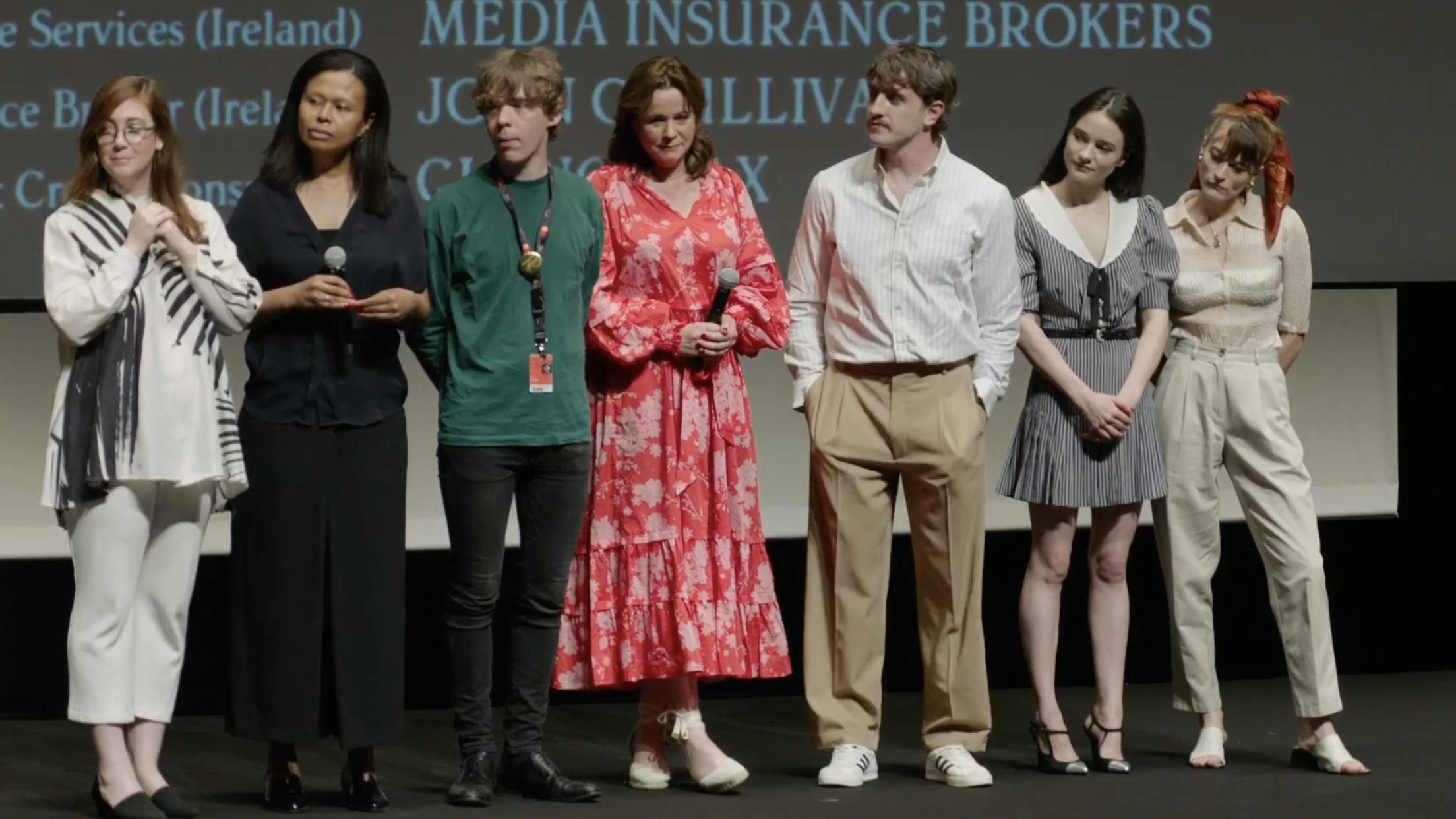
Holmer, Davis, Crowley, Watson, Mescal, Franciosi, and O'Rourke at the 2022 Directors' Fortnight.

God's Creatures was announced on 22 May 2019, when it was reported that Saela Davis and Anna Rose Holmer would direct a then-untitled gothic film produced by Fodhla Cronin O'Reilly. In June 2020, it was announced that BBC Film, Screen Ireland, and the Western Region Audiovisual Producer's Fund (WRAP) would finance the project. In May 2021, Emily Watson and Paul Mescal joined the cast. Crew members included production designer Inbal Weinberg, cinematographer Chayse Irvin, and editor Julia Bloch.

== Release ==
The film premiered at the Cannes Film Festival on 19 May 2022. It was released in the United States in cinemas and on demand on 30 September 2022 by A24. In January 2023, UK distribution rights were acquired by BFI Distribution from A24, with the BFI partnering with Volta Pictures to release the film in Ireland. The film was released theatrically in Ireland on 23 March 2023, followed by the United Kingdom on 31 March.

== Reception ==
=== Critical response ===
On the review aggregator Rotten Tomatoes, 89% of 95 reviews are positive, with an average rating of 7.2/10. The website's critics consensus reads, "Painfully raw yet rewarding, God's Creatures explores the limits of a mother's love with an outstanding Emily Watson leading the way". Metacritic, which uses a weighted average, assigned the film a score of 69 out of 100, based on 30 critics, indicating "generally favorable reviews".

Screen Rant gave it a 4-star rating. The header summary stated: "God's Creatures is an unnerving rural gothic tale with two quietly fierce performances that make the film's slow burn to its climax worth the wait."

=== Accolades ===
Award	Date of ceremony	Category	Recipient(s)	Result	Ref.
British Independent Film Awards	4 December 2022	Best Lead Performance	Emily Watson	Nominated	
British Independent Film Awards	4 December 2022	Best Supporting Performance	Paul Mescal	Nominated	
British Independent Film Awards	4 December 2022	Best Supporting Performance	Aisling Franciosi	Nominated	
British Independent Film Awards	4 December 2022	Best Original Music	Saunder Jurriaans and Danny Bensi	Nominated	
British Independent Film Awards	4 December 2022	Best Debut Screenwriter	Shane Crowley	Nominated	
