= Fodhla Cronin O'Reilly =

Irish film producer

Fodhla Cronin O'Reilly is an Irish film producer based in London, United Kingdom. She produced Lady Macbeth starring Florence Pugh, God's Creatures starring Emily Watson and Paul Mescal, Ammonite starring Kate Winslet and Saoirse Ronan and My Generation starring Michael Caine. She was nominated for an Academy Award for her short film, Head Over Heels and two BAFTA Awards for Lady Macbeth.

== Early life and education ==
Cronin O'Reilly grew up in County Kerry, Ireland, and attended the Killorglin Intermediate School. She went on to further education at St. John's Central College in Cork, and did work experience at Ardmore Studios, in special effects, editing and as a camera operator.

She studied film theory and video production at the University of West London, and graduated in 2008. She then attended the National Film and Television School in Beaconsfield, and graduated in 2012 with an MA in film producing.

== Career ==
Cronin O'Reilly was nominated for an Academy Award for her graduation short film, Head Over Heels. She worked as co-producer on Dead Cat (2013). Her next film, Lady Macbeth (2017), won five British Independent Film Awards.

Of God's Creatures (2022), Cronin O'Reilly has said: "I grew up in a small fishing village in Kerry, I'm from a family of fishermen, and there were certain things I wanted to explore that exist within my world. ... I was also hearing different stories of women in particular, making allegations of sexual assault and how they were being treated by their own communities, their own neighbors".

Cronin O'Reilly has said that she is attracted to telling women's stories: "exploring the complexity of being a woman within this world or any world, and exploring their flaws and strengths".

== Filmography ==
- God's Creatures (2022)
- Ammonite (2020)
- My Generation (2018)
- Lady Macbeth (2017)
- Dead Cat (2013), co-producer
- Head Over Heels (2012)
