= Stephen Bradley (film director) =

Irish filmmaker

- Occupations: director, scriptwriter, producer
- Years active: 1989–present
- Spouse: Deirdre O'Kane
- Children: Holly, Daniel

Stephen Bradley is an Irish director, scriptwriter, and producer.

== Filmography ==
=== Director ===
- Sweety Barrett (1998)
- Boy Eats Girl (2005)
- Noble (2015)
- Fran the Man (2025)

=== Writer ===
- Sweety Barrett (1998)
- Noble (2014)

=== Producer ===
- My Left Foot (1989) (assistant to line producer)
- Guiltrip (1995) (executive producer)

== Bibliography ==
- Bradley, Stephen (2019). Shooting and Cutting:: A Survivor's Guide to Filmmaking and Other Diseases. Mercier Press. ISBN 978-1781176764.
