= Christina Bennington =

Northern Irish actress & singer

- Born: Lisburn, Northern Ireland, UK
- Origin: Belfast, Northern Ireland
- Genre: Musical theatre
- Occupations: Singer; actress
- Years active: 2013–present
- Website: www.christinabennington.com

Christina Bennington is a Northern Irish actress and singer. She is best known for originating the lead role of Raven in Bat Out of Hell: The Musical, in various productions of the show from 2017 to 2019 in both the UK and North America.

== Early and education ==
Christina Bennington was born in Lisburn, just outside Belfast in Northern Ireland, United Kingdom.

She attended Methodist College Belfast, where she served as head girl. She went on to study at Guildford School of Acting in Surrey, graduating with a Bachelor of Arts in Musical Theatre awarded by the University of Surrey.

== Career ==
Bennington has starred as Raven in all English-language productions of Bat Out Of Hell The Musical since the show's launch in Manchester 2017, with the exception of the 2018 North American tour (where Raven was played by Emily Schultheis), as this ran concurrently with the show's West End run at the Dominion Theatre, London. The show's author / composer Jim Steinman praised her performance.

According to one of the musical's producers David Sonenberg, the show had been extremely profitable, and by August 2018 had played to over 500,000 people. It also broke box office records at the Dominion Theatre, taking £350,000 in its first day of ticket sales.

=== Discography ===
Bennington features heavily on the cast recording for Bat Out Of Hell The Musical in her role as Raven, singing the song Heaven Can Wait as a solo, duetting on the songs Making Love Out Of Nothing At All and For Crying Out Loud, and featuring as a lead in the songs It's All Coming Back To Me Now and I'd Do Anything For Love (But I Won't Do That).

In late 2018, Bennington joined two groups in recording charity singles - as one of The Celebs in a charity record Rock With Rudolph, which was written and produced by Grahame and Jack Corbyn. It was a Christmas song which aimed to raise funds for the Great Ormond Street Hospital and was released digitally on independent record label Saga Entertainment on 30 November 2018. The music video debuted exclusively with The Sun on 29 November 2018, and had its first TV showing on Good Morning Britain on 30 November 2018. The song peaked at number two on the iTunes pop chart. She also participated in the "West End Friends" recording the Carole King song You Got A Friend to raise money for Barnardo's.

In 2020, during the COVID-19 pandemic, Bennington returned to join The Celebs, which now included Frank Bruno and X Factor winner Sam Bailey to raise money for both Alzheimer's Society and Action for Children. They recorded a new rendition of Merry Christmas Everyone by Shakin' Stevens and it was released digitally on 11 December 2020, on independent record label Saga Entertainment. The music video debuted exclusively on Good Morning Britain the day before release. The song peaked at number two on the iTunes pop chart.

=== Televised theatre performances ===
She also appeared as Raven in several televised performances of songs from Bat Out Of Hell. On UK television, this includes appearances on Tonight at the London Palladium, This Morning, Britain's Got Talent, and as one of the contributing acts in the 2018 Proms In The Park, accompanied by the BBC Concert Orchestra. And on US television, as part of the cast performing on The Today Show.

=== Concerts ===
Bennington performed two sold out solo shows at The Crazy Coqs in London on 7 January 2019.

=== Television ===
Bennington portrays Cortana in season 2 of Halo and Charlotte in Hunting Alice Bell

== Awards and nominations ==
Bennington was nominated for "Understudy of the Year" in the BroadwayWorld UK Awards for Magnolia in Showboat at the New London Theatre in 2016.

For her role as Raven in Bat Out Of Hell The Musical, Bennington received nominations for "Best Actress in a Musical" in two award ceremonies: the 2017 BroadwayWorld UK Awards, and the 2018 WhatsOnStage Awards. The show Bat Out Of Hell The Musical won The Evening Standard's "Best Musical" award in 2017, and Bennington accepted the award alongside co-star Andrew Polec.

== Personal life ==
Bennington attributes her energy levels needed to perform eight shows a week to a Pilates regime and vegan diet.

== Theatre credits ==
Year	Show	Role	Theatre	Location
2013-14	A Christmas Carol	Marilyn	Birmingham Repertory Theatre	Birmingham
2014-15	Finian's Rainbow	Sharon	Union Theatre	Off-West End
2015	The Smallest Show on Earth	Marlene Hardcastle	Mercury Theatre	Colchester
2015	Oklahoma!	Ensemble / Cover Laurey	—N/a	UK National Tour
2016	Show Boat	Kim / Ensemble / Understudy Magnolia	New London Theatre	London
2016	Sweeney Todd	Johanna	Derby Theatre / Mercury Theatre	Derby / Colchester
2017	Bat Out of Hell: The Musical	Raven	Manchester Opera House	Manchester
2017	Bat Out of Hell: The Musical	Raven	London Coliseum	West End
2017-18	Bat Out of Hell: The Musical	Raven	Ed Mirvish Theatre	Toronto
2018-19	Bat Out of Hell: The Musical	Raven	Dominion Theatre	West End
2019-20	Bat Out of Hell: The Musical	Raven	New York City Center	New York
2021	Heathers: The Musical	Veronica Sawyer	Theatre Royal Haymarket	West End
