= Emily Barber =

English actress (born 1991)

- Born: 26 September 1991 (age 35); Peterborough, England
- Occupation: Actress
- Years active: 2013–present
- Awards: Best Newcomer Manchester Theatre Awards 2015, Commendation Ian Charleson Awards 2015

Emily Barber (born 26 September 1991) is an English stage, television, and film actress. She is known for her roles in The Alienist (2020), Bridgerton, Industry, and Mobland.

Barber's theatre career started with Best Newcomer at the Manchester Theatre Awards for her debut as Liz in Billy Liar at the Royal Exchange Theatre in 2015. She followed that with a nomination for the Ian Charleson Awards for her performance as Imogen in Cymbeline at the Globe Theatre in 2016.

== Career ==
Barber graduated from the Royal Welsh College of Music and Drama in 2014, for which she received a bursary from The Richard Carne Trust. She had her professional debut as Liz in Billy Liar, at the Royal Exchange Theatre, for which she was named Best Newcomer at the Manchester Theatre Awards in 2015. Barber received a Commendation at the 2015 Ian Charleson Awards for her lead role as Imogen in Cymbeline at Shakespeare's Globe. Her appearance in Cymbeline also prompted The Independent to name her as "One to Watch". Later in 2015 she starred opposite David Suchet in The Importance of Being Earnest at London's Vaudeville Theatre. Between May 2024 and February 2025, Barber played the lead role of Ewen Montagu in Operation Mincemeat at London's Fortune Theatre.

Alongside a series of theatrical roles and guest television appearances in subsequent years, Barber has also had a recurring role as Cassandra Von Halen in The Royals for the E! TV network. She played the role of Violet Hayward opposite Luke Evans in Season 2 of the TNT/Paramount TV Series The Alienist.

== Theatre performances ==
- 2013 Judy in Cornelius by John Boynton Priestley directed by Sam Yates at the Finborough Theatre
- 2013 Viola in the Richard Burton Company's production of Twelfth Night
- 2014 Liz in Billy Liar by Keith Waterhouse. Directed by Sam Yates at the Royal Exchange, Manchester
- 2015 Gwendolen in The Importance Of Being Earnest by Oscar Wilde. Directed by Adrian Noble at the Vaudeville Theatre
- 2015 Imogen in Cymbeline by William Shakespeare. Directed by Sam Yates at the Globe Theatre
- 2016 Harrison in Boys Will Be Boys by Melissa Bubnic. Directed by Amy Hodge at the Bush Theatre.
- 2014 Antigone in Oedipus Rex by Sophocles. Directed by Peter Sellars at the Royal Festival Hall
- 2016 Judy in Trouble In Mind by Alice Childress. Directed by Laurence Boswell at the Theatre Royal, Bath
- 2019 Jess in Cost of Living by Martyna Majok. Directed by Edward Hall at the Hampstead Theatre
- 2022 Lydia in Love All at the Jermyn Street Theatre
- 2023 Backstairs Billy at the Duke of York's Theatre in the West End, directed by Michael Grandage
- 2024 Ewen Montagu in Operation Mincemeat at the Fortune Theatre
- 2025 Evelyn Williams in American Psycho at the Almeida Theatre

== TV and film roles ==
- 2018 Lucy Grey in Endeavour (TV series)
- 2018 Cassandra in The Royals (TV series)
- 2019 Cath in Call The Midwife (TV series)
- 2020 Violet Hayward in The Alienist (TV series)
- 2019 PR Flak in Backdraft 2 (film)
- 2022 Tessa in Bridgerton (TV series)
- 2023 Eva in Dreamland (TV series)
- 2024 Diana Ramdani in Industry (TV series)
- 2025 Alice Barnes / Nicola in MobLand (TV series)
- 2025 Sylvia Bruce in Midsomer Murders (TV series)
- 2026 Vanessa in Hunting Alice Bell
