= The Smallest Show on Earth (musical) =

The Smallest Show On Earth
- Music: Thom Southerland and Paul Alexander
- Basis: The Smallest Show on Earth

The Smallest Show on Earth is a 2015 musical based on the 1957 British film of the same name. The stage musical incorporates songs by Irving Berlin. It was the idea of director Thom Southerland, who wrote the script for the musical with Paul Alexander. The first production of the musical opened at The Mercury Theatre Colchester on 25 September 2015.

== Musical adaptation ==
The original 1957 film is not a musical, so the principal difference between the film script by William Rose and John Eldridge, and the script for the musical is the addition of songs by Irving Berlin. The character of Matt Spenser, played in the movie by Bill Travers, is portrayed in the musical as a British screenwriter, and the character of Tom, played in the film by Bernard Miles, is a much younger character and becomes the son of Margaret Rutherford’s character in the film, Mrs Fazackalee. The character of Marlene in the film becomes the daughter of the rival cinema owner Albert Hardcastle, who also is given a wife in the musical. The plot of the musical follows the film in broad outline but with a number of changes, including a different ending to the story.

== Irving Berlin songs ==
The songs by Irving Berlin that have been incorporated in the musical are:

- A Simple Melody
- In Our Hideaway
- Blue Skies
- Always
- Shakin' the Blues Away
- It's a Lovely Day Today
- When Winter Comes
- Count Your Blessings (Instead of Sheep)
- It's a Lovely Day Tomorrow
- This Time
- Don’t be Afraid of Romance
- They Love Me
- Let Yourself Go
- Is He the Only Man in the World
- What'll I Do?
- Steppin' Out With My Baby
- The Song is Ended (but the Melody Lingers On)
- How Deep is the Ocean
- You Can't Brush Me Off

== Synopsis ==
The Smallest Show on Earth tells the story of young and upcoming British screenwriter Matt Spenser and his newly married wife Jean. Despite the surprise success of Matt's first film Crisis in Camberley, Matt and Jean are very short of money. They are pinning their hopes of financial stability on Matt's sequel Crisis in Cairo, and are nervously awaiting the script approval of the film's star Lance Duke.

But when a solicitor’s letter arrives informing Matt he has inherited from his Uncle Simon the ownership of a cinema in Sloughborough, the couple, unaware of the true nature of their good fortune, immediately set off to see their new "gold-mine".

Even before the local solicitor Robin Carter can introduce Matt and Jean to the Bijou and its staff, they are confronted by Albert and Ethel Hardcastle, the owners of the rival cinema in Sloughborough – The Grand. Robin hopes the Hardcastles will make Matt and Jean a good offer to purchase the Bijou, but instead they make a derisory one. Albert's daughter Marlene is suspicious of her stepmother Ethel's intentions.

Matt is convinced fate is on their side – "I'm a screenwriter who has inherited a cinema" – and persuades Jean they must revitalise the Bijou. Only then will the Hardcastles make them a proper offer. Once inside the Bijou, Matt and Jean discover the enormity of their task. Not only is the place extremely run-down, with very low audience numbers, Mr Quill, the projectionist and Mrs Fazackalee, the cashier, are at loggerheads. Mrs Fazackalee blames the hard-drinking Quill for the death of her beloved Simon. Her son Tom Fazackalee is too shy to stop their squabbling. Nonetheless, Matt and Jean convince the trio that with a good make-over the future can be bright, and with Robin's help they set about the refurbishment. The Hardcastles are surprised to receive an invitation to the Grand Re-Opening of the Bijou, and decide they must sabotage it. To her horror, Marlene discovers that her step-mother's plan is to acquire the Bijou cheaply and then demolish it, to make way for a new car park for the patrons of The Grand. Marlene storms out.

The disaster is made worse when Matt is called away to the set of Crisis in Cairo at Shepperton Studios – Lance Duke will not approve Matt's script. Jean begs him to stay, but Matt now believes their only chance of financial survival is to save his film. Jean is heartbroken, but her sorrow turns to anger when Marlene reveals that the reason no-one attended the Grand Re-Opening was because Ethel Hardcastle bribed the local newspaper, The Sloughborough Echo, to print a Cancellation. Jean and Mrs Fazackalee rally their troops and decide they will bring back the tradition of live musical entertainment during their films' intermissions. To their surprise they are joined by Marlene, whose blossoming relationship with Tom has led her to sever her links with her father and step-mother, and also Robin Carter who admits to a fascination with a career in show-biz. Mr Quill announces, in the best interests of The Bijou's future, he will never drink again.

However, the course to success for the Bijou is not plain sailing, as the Hardcastles try one trick after another to bring down the new palace of entertainment.

== Initial production ==
The initial production was a co-production between the Mercury Theatre, Colchester and producers Brian Eastman and Christabel Albery. It was directed by Thom Southerland. It was due to open on 25 September 2015 at the Mercury Theatre, Colchester, and then play at the Belgrade Theatre, Coventry, the Swan Theatre, High Wycombe, the Theatre Royal, Glasgow, the Theatre Royal, Plymouth, the Lyceum Theatre, Crewe, the Grand Theatre, Swansea and the Festival Theatre, Malvern.

=== Cast ===
- Liza Goddard (Mrs. Fazackalee)
- Brian Capron (Mr Quill)
- Laura Pitt-Pulford (Jean Spenser)
- Haydn Oakley (Matt Spenser)
- Ricky Butt (Ethel Hardcastle)
- Philip Rham (Albert Hardcastle)
- Christina Bennington (Marlene Hardcastle)
- Sam O’Rourke (Tom Fazackalee)
- Matthew Crowe (Robin Carter)
- Leo Andrew (Simon/Fred/Ensemble)
- Jacob Chapman (Ensemble)
- Matthew Dale (Ensemble)
- Nova Skip (Ensemble)
- Leah West (Ensemble)

=== Creative team ===
- Thom Southerland (Director)
- Thom Southerland and Paul Alexander (Writers)
- David Woodhead (Set and Costumes)
- Lee Proud (Choreographer)
- Howard Hudson (Lighting Designer)
- Andrew Johnson (Sound Designer)
- Gareth Valentine (Musical Supervisor)
- Mark Cumberland (Orchestrations)
- Mark Aspinall (Musical Director)
- Will Burton CDG (Casting)
- The Mercury Theatre Colchester (Producer)
- Brian Eastman (Producer)
- Christabel Albery (Producer)
