= Head over Heels (2012 film) =

- Directed by: Timothy Reckart
- Written by: Timothy Reckart
- Produced by: Fodhla Cronin O'Reilly
- Starring: Nigel Anthony; Rayyah McCaul
- Music by: Jered Sorkin
- Animation by: Timothy Reckart; Sam Turner
- Production company: National Film and Television School
- Distributed by: ShortsHD
- Release date: 2012
- Running time: 10 minutes
- Country: United Kingdom

Head over Heels is a 2012 British stop-motion animated short film written and directed by Timothy Reckart. The film was nominated for Best Animated Short Film for the 85th Academy Awards. It also won the first Annie Award for Best Student film and the Cartoon d'Or for Best European Animated Short.

After being nominated for an Academy Award the film was released along with all the other 15 Oscar-nominated short films in theaters by ShortsHD.

In March 2015, the film was posted online together with special features at www.headoverheels.tv.

== Plot ==
After many years of marriage, husband and wife Walter and Madge have grown apart: he lives on the floor and she lives on the ceiling. They live separate, parallel lives, never talking, barely even looking at each other. When Walter tries to reignite their old romance, it brings their love crashing down, and the couple who can't agree which way is up must find a way to put their marriage back together.

== Awards ==
- 40th Annual Annie Awards, Best Student Film
- Edinburgh International Film Festival, Short Animation, Nominated for Best Film in British Short Film Competition
- Galway Film Fleadh, Cartoon Saloon Best First Animation Award
- Anima Mundi, Rio de Janeiro & São Paulo, Brazil Short Animation, Best Film (Jury and Audience Award), Best Student Film (Audience Award)
- Hiroshima International Animation Festival, Short Animation, Audience Prize
- Encounters Short Film and Animation Festival, Short Animation, Nomination for Cartoon d'Or
- St Petersburg Student Film Festival, Short Animation, Diploma for the Work of the Animation Artist
- Animage Festival Pernambuco, Short Animation, Audience Award for Best Short Film
- Festival du Film Britannique de Dinard, Best Short Film
- Austin Film Festival, Best Animated Short, Audience Award for Animated Short
- Heartland Film Festival, Best Short Film, Jimmy Stewart Memorial Crystal Heart Award
- Cinanima Espinho, Short Animation, Special Jury Prize
- Bath Film Festival, IMDb New Filmmaker Award
- Fancine Málaga, Short Animation Best Animated Short (Jury Prize, Audience Prize and Youth Jury Prize)
- Brazil Stop Motion Pernambuco, Best Student Film (Prix du Public)
- Animpact Max Seoul, Audience Prize
- Animateka International Animation Film Fest, Best European Student Film

== Festivals ==
- Cannes Film Festival, Cinefondation Category
- SICAF Seoul, Graduation Films
- Guanajuato International Film Festival, Short Animation
- Molise Cinema Festival, Short Animation
- KROK International Animated Film Festival, Short Animation
- World Festival of Animated Film of Varna, Short Animation
- Raindance Film Festival, Short film
- Hamptons International Film Festival, Short film
- Anim'est Bucharest, Audience Competition
- Colchester Film Festival, Short Film
- Kerry Film Festival, Short Animation
- Warsaw Film Festival, Short Film
- Montreal Stop Motion Film Festival, Short Animation
- Razor Reel Fantastic Film Festival Bruges

== Credits ==
Nigel Anthony as Walter
Rayyah McCaul as Madge
Puppet Fabricators- Sophie Huckfield and Charlie Buck (Arts University Bournemouth)
Cinematographer - Chloë Thomson
Production Designer - Eleonore Cremonese
Editor - James Taylor
Sound Designer - Axle Kith Cheeng
Music Composed & Performed by Jered Sorkin
Special FX Supervisor - Jennifer Groves
Visual FX Supervisor - Helen Brownell
Production Manager - Lizzie Bull
Script Editor - Tom Hill
Produced by Fodhla Cronin O'Reilly
Written & Directed by Timothy Reckart
