= Irish Film Theatre =

Cinema in Dublin, Ireland (1977–1984)

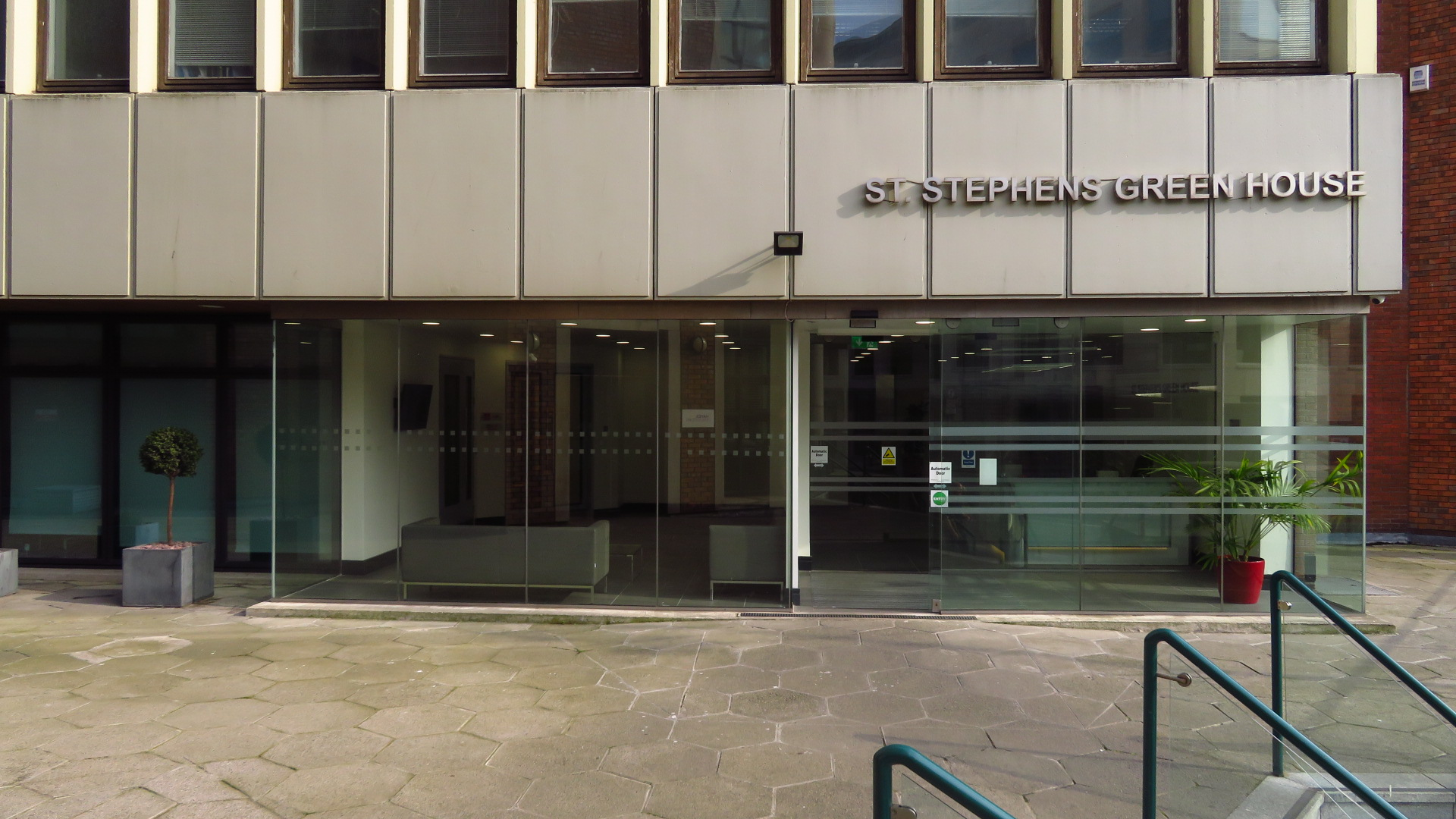
- St. Stephen's Green House, site of the cinema
- Interactive map of Irish Film Theatre
- Former names: International Cinema
- Address: St. Stephen's Green House; Earlsfort Terrace; Dublin; Ireland
- Coordinates: 53.335570°N 6.257086°W
- Type: Former Dublin cinema
- Current use: Arts/entertainment venue and bar

Construction
- Opened: 1977
- Closed: May 1984

The Irish Film Theatre (IFT) was a cinema dedicated to showing art films in Dublin in Ireland from 1977 to 1984.

The Arts Council of Ireland established Irish Film Theatre Limited as a company to promote the art of cinema in Ireland. The cinema took over the theatre used by the former International Cinema at St. Stephen's Green House which, at the time, also housed the headquarters of the Irish Sugar Company in Earlsfort Terrace, beside St. Stephen's Green.

== Programming ==
The IFT played the important role of bringing to Ireland notable developments in the art of cinema of which the public were otherwise deprived by lack of interest from mainstream Irish cinemas, or which had been or would have been banned, or significantly damaged by cuts by the Irish film censor at the time. The cinema screened mostly non-mainstream work usually unavailable elsewhere in Ireland including Irish film, independent film, and foreign language film from around the world.

Established classic films were exhibited alongside new releases, allowing audiences the chance to view work from Western and Eastern Europe, Africa, Asia, Australia, and Latin and North America at a time when cinema programming in Ireland was usually confined to mainstream English language material from the United States and Britain. Films from Britain and the United States that were ignored by Irish commercial cinemas were also shown, such as Sebastiane by Derek Jarman, Nashville by Robert Altman, and Between the Lines by Joan Micklin Silver.

== Avoidance of censorship ==
The cinema operated as a film club where members paid a fee to join. Members could also bring non-members as their guests. Under the Censorship of Films Act, 1923 (amended in 1925, 1930, 1970, and 1992) only films to be shown to the general public needed to be submitted to the film censor to receive a certificate allowing exhibition. Films screened in private clubs were uninspected and were shown in their entirety without any censorship.

Foreign language and independent films that were radically forthright, and that would otherwise have been cut or banned by the Irish censor, were shown in their complete forms, including Pasolini's Salò, Oshima's Ai No Corrida, Bertolucci's Last Tango in Paris, and many other films whose portrayals of nudity and sexuality would have triggered bans or cuts in Ireland at that time.

== Closure ==
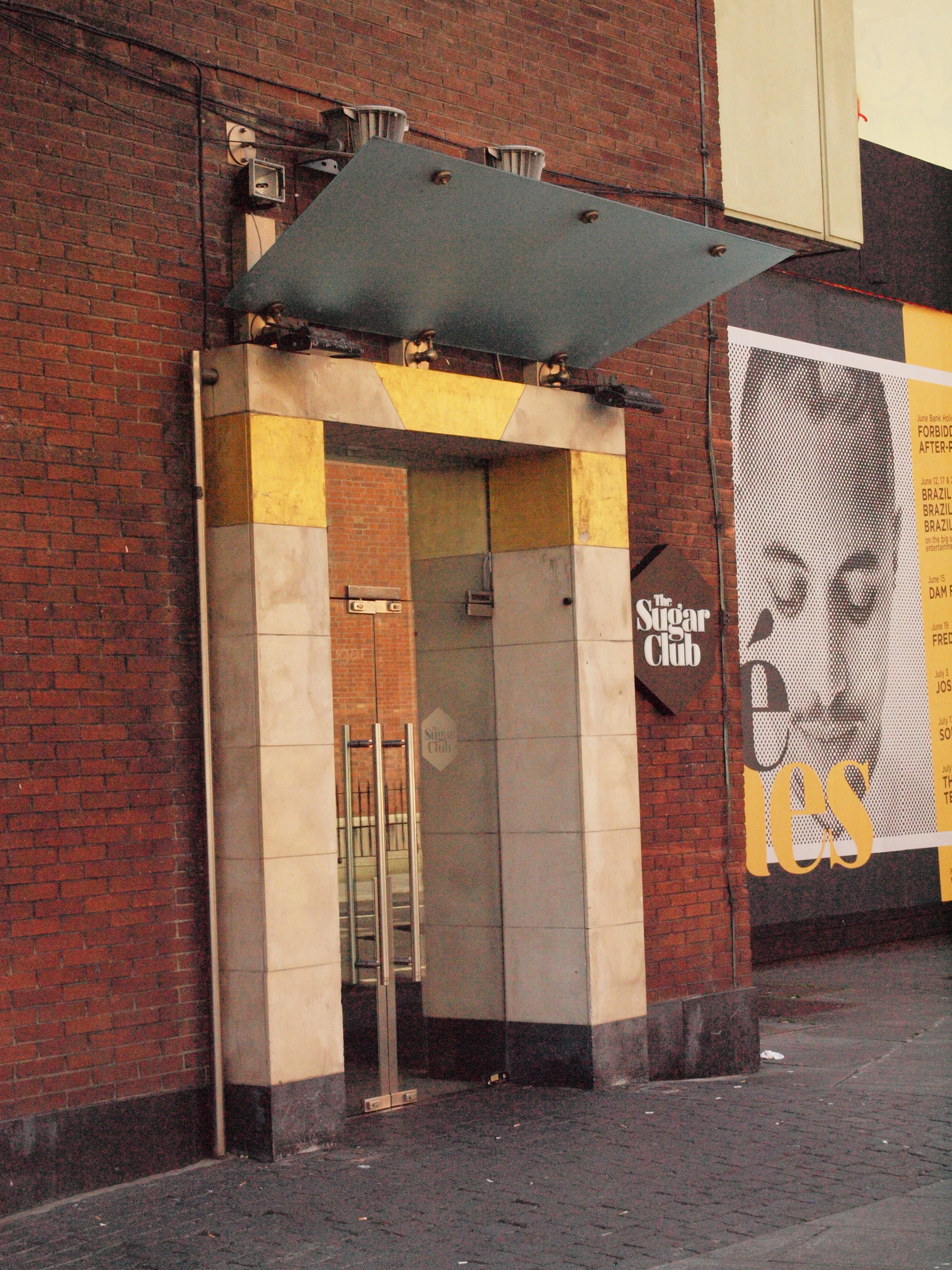
The Sugar Club

The financially ailing Irish Film Theatre was closed by the Arts Council at the end of May 1984. The final film shown was Forbidden Relations, a Hungarian drama about incest.

The IFT was itself a successor to the Irish Film Society, and the role of showing art cinema played by the IFT was later undertaken in Dublin by the Irish Film Centre in Temple Bar in 1992, by the Screen Cinema on Hawkins Street, and by the Light House Cinema in Smithfield.

The theatre in Earlsfort Terrace reopened in 1999 as a multi-purpose arts-and-entertainment venue and bar called The Sugar Club, with the entrance moved around the corner to Leeson Street.
