= Boy Eats Girl =

- Unrated DVD cover
- Directed by: Stephen Bradley
- Written by: Derek Landy
- Produced by: Ed Guiney; Andrew Lowe
- Starring: Samantha Mumba; David Leon; Laurence Kinlan
- Cinematography: Balazs Bolygo
- Edited by: Dermot Diskin
- Music by: Hugh Drumm
- Production company: Element Films
- Distributed by: Odyssey Distributors Ltd.
- Release date: 27 June 2005 (London UK Film Focus)
- Running time: 80 minutes
- Countries: Ireland; United Kingdom
- Language: English
- Box office: $130,051

Boy Eats Girl is a 2005 horror-comedy film directed by Stephen Bradley and starring Samantha Mumba, produced and shot in Ireland. The plot tells of a teenage boy who comes back to life as a zombie, similar to the plot of the American film My Boyfriend's Back.

== Plot ==
While working in the church, a woman named Grace finds a hidden crypt. While exploring she discovers a voodoo book; however, she is soon sent away by Father Cornelius. Grace's son, Nathan, attends the local high school with his friends Henry and Diggs. Nathan likes his long-time friend Jessica; however, he is too scared to ask her out, for fear of rejection. Also in the school are popular girls Charlotte, Glenda and Cheryl. Cheryl pursues Nathan, despite already having a boyfriend, Samson, who confronts Nathan along with his womanising friend Kenneth after seeing Cheryl talking to Nathan. Meanwhile, Henry and Diggs, fed up with Nathan not asking out Jessica, force the pair to meet after school.

While Nathan waits for Jessica, he writes a note about what he will say to her to ask her out. Meanwhile, Jessica's over-protective father forbids her to leave, but she sneaks out. Nathan becomes impatient due to Jessica's lateness and leaves before Jessica arrives; she reads the note, however, through a misunderstanding, Nathan believes Jessica is with Kenneth. Nathan goes home and contemplates hanging himself in his room. Just as he dismisses the idea, Grace enters and knocks over the chair Nathan is standing on, causing him to be hanged. Grace returns to the church and performs a ritual from the book, which brings Nathan back to life. The ritual seems to have gone well, despite Nathan not remembering what happened, however Father Cornelius soon warns Grace that the book was damaged and those who are resurrected by it have the urge to eat human flesh.

At school, Nathan hears Kenneth lying about what happened with Jessica the previous night to Samson and another friend, Shane. As Jessica attempts to ask Nathan out, he turns her down, thinking what Kenneth said was true. As the day progresses, Nathan slowly succumbs to the symptoms of the book. At night, everyone heads to a school disco, where Nathan soon becomes more zombie-like and bites Samson before returning home. As Samson becomes a zombie, he attacks Shane and infects him. Jessica goes to Nathan's house to sort things out, but Nathan warns Jessica away from him, realising something is wrong with him.

The next morning, Grace tells Nathan what happened. Nathan realises that Samson is infected and tries to get the police to help capture him, but he is ignored. Returning home, Grace locks Nathan in the garage and starts to search for something to help him recover. Meanwhile, Charlotte has also become a zombie and infects Kenneth. Cheryl and Glenda go to a local bar, where they witness a zombie attack. Henry and Diggs also witness a zombie attack in the video shop. Henry and Diggs hide, and see that most of the town have been infected. They phone Jessica and tell her to lock herself inside her house. Henry and Diggs travel to Nathan's house and free him, before setting off to Jessica's. However, on their way they crash their car and have to continue on foot. Jessica is attacked by zombies in her house, including Samson, but she overpowers them and manages to escape.

Grace goes to the church, but is attacked by an infected Father Cornelius. He is soon bitten by a snake in the crypt, revealing the snake's venom is the cure to the infection. She takes the snake and leaves. Outside, Cheryl and Glenda are hiding in the graveyard. They encounter the infected Charlotte, who bites Glenda, allowing Cheryl to get away. Nathan finds Jessica in a barn beside her house, where Jessica tells Nathan that she never did anything with Kenneth. Meanwhile, Henry and Diggs arrive at Jessica's house, followed by Cheryl, who is being chased by a group of zombies. They hide in a cupboard in the house until night time, when they try to escape. As they go outside they are saved by Nathan, however a group of zombies close in on them. Jessica manages to kill them with the aid of a tractor.

The survivors hide in the barn, but Samson and Shane get in and infect Cheryl. The others manage to escape to a platform, but are now trapped. They pour gasoline onto the barn floor, before Grace arrives with the snake. However, the snake escapes and the zombies begin to attack Grace. Nathan saves Grace, allowing her to escape, and also kills Samson. Nathan soon completely succumbs to the ritual, and becomes a zombie. As he is about to attack his friends, the snake bites him. The zombies quickly attack Nathan and he is caught in the fire that Jessica has ignited. Jessica, Diggs and Henry leave, and soon discover Nathan survived the fire. He finally asks Jessica to go out with him, to which she answers yes.

== Cast ==
- Samantha Mumba as Jessica
- David Leon as Nathan
- Tadhg Murphy as Diggs
- Laurence Kinlan as Henry
- Sara James as Cheryl
- Mark Huberman as Samson
- Sarah Burke as Charlotte
- Paul Reid as Shane
- Jane Valentine as Glenda
- Conor Ryan as Kenneth
- Deirdre O'Kane as Grace
- Lalor Roddy as Father Cornelius
- Domhnall Gleeson as Bernard

== Production ==
The film was shot in six weeks. Director Stephen Bradley cast Deirdre O'Kane, his wife, over her objections that she was too young to convincingly play the mother of a teenager. The film was shot in Dublin and the Isle of Man. The special effects were done by Bob Keen.

== Release ==
The film was the first non-pornographic film for some years to be banned by the Irish Film Classification Office (IFCO), due to a depiction of suicide. While the scene was not cut from the film, the IFCO appeals board overturned the ban, issuing a 15A rating. Boy Eats Girl premiered at the London UK Film Focus. It was picked up for theatrical release by Optimum Releasing, and it received its Irish theatrical premiere on 23 September 2005.

=== Home media ===
The film was released on DVD on 18 December 2007.

== Reception ==
Rotten Tomatoes, a review aggregator, reports that Boy Eats Girl received positive reviews from 80% of five surveyed critics; the average rating was 5.7/10. Joshua Siebalt of Dread Central rated the film 3/5 stars and called it "fun, plain and simple." Felix Vasquez, Jr. of Film Threat rated the film 3/5 stars and called it "a pretty kick ass rom-zom-com that deserves at least a viewing." Bill Gibron of DVD Talk rated the film 2/5; Gibron stated that the film "looks really good" and has moody, atmospheric shots, but the film itself is too derivative of Shaun of the Dead. David Johnson of DVD Verdict called it "Funny, gory and just flat-out entertaining". Mike Bruno of Entertainment Weekly called it "kinda stupid and riddled with plot holes" but "a pretty good time." Bloody Disgusting rated the film 3/5 stars and described it as "an OK zombie film that plays on teen love antics".
