= Christina Noble Children's Foundation =

The Christina Noble Children's Foundation (CNCF) is an international non-government organization, dedicated to serving the world's oppressed and marginalized children. It was founded following a visit to Vietnam by Christina Noble, who was prompted by a dream she had had during the time of the Vietnam War, of Vietnamese children begging for her help. After visiting the country in 1989, Noble founded the foundation in 1991 in Ho Chi Minh City. In 1997, the foundation extended its services to Mongolia.

== Programmes ==
The Christina Noble Children's Foundation has established a number of health centres and has been involved in a number of community development projects such as rural water programs. It has also established kindergartens and schools for underprivileged children in Vietnam, such as the Sunshine School.

The Sunshine School provides primary education to street children and children from underprivileged families. Children also receive medical care and participate in extracurricular activities.

The Tay Ninh Centre is a residential and education centre, located in the Tay Ninh province, in which visually impaired students are given an education and taught life skills.

== Fundraising ==
According to the charity's 2018 annual report, of its approximately US$3 million in income for that year, 76% came from donations (including institutional, corporate and individual donors), with 18% coming from fundraising activities, and the remainder from other sources and tax relief.
