= Aarch =

Aarch may refer to:

- Aarch (Galactik Football), a character from French series Galactik Football
- AArch64, the 64-bit ARM execution state
- AArch32, the 32-bit ARM execution state
- African American Resources Cultural and Heritage Society (AARCH Society), a non-profit historical society
