= African American Resources Cultural and Heritage Society =

Non-profit organization

The African American Resources Cultural and Heritage Society (AARCH Society), is a non-profit organization based in Frederick, Maryland that is dedicated to the documentation of African American history in the United States, or more narrowly in Frederick County, Maryland. The Society was established in 2001 and incorporated as a non-profit in 2009. The notion for the creation of the Society has been attributed to William Lee, Jr., a past alderman of the city of Frederick.

The AARCH Society shares the history, heritage, and culture of both past and present African Americans in its local communities by preserving and showcasing objects, artifacts and stories.

In addition to maintaining historical document archives and a number of other activities, the Society restores African American cemeteries.

AARCH Society is a member of the National Park Service's African American Civil Rights Network.

The first president of the society, from 2001 until his death in 2021, was David Key. The president as of 2025 was Olivia White.
