= Black Peter (disambiguation) =

Black Peter or Zwarte Piet is a fictional character who is Father Christmas's helper in the Netherlands

It may also refer to:

People

- Black Peter (highwayman), Johann Peter Petri (1752–after 1812), a notorious highwayman from the Palatinate
- Black Peter (bandit), Peter Nikoll (1771–1817), a notorious robber chieftain from Mecklenburg

Games

- Black Peter (card game), a European card game whose name is sometimes attributed to the above criminals
- a British tag game played by children; see British Bulldog (game) § Black Man

Entertainment and literature

- Black Peter (film), a 1964 movie by Miloš Forman
- "Black Peter" (song), by the Grateful Dead from their 1970 album Workingman's Dead
- "The Adventure of Black Peter", a 1904 Sherlock Holmes story by Arthur Conan Doyle

== See also ==
- Black Pete (disambiguation)
