= Schwarzer Peter =

Schwarzer Peter is German for Black Peter and may refer to:

- Johann Peter Petri (1752–after 1812), German robber, known as Schwarzer Peter
- Schwarzer Peter (card game), the German children's card game of Black Peter
- Schwarzer Peter, an opera by Norbert Schultze (1911–2002)
- Tatort: Schwarzer Peter, a 2009 German TV film by Christine Hartmann
- Schwarzer Peter (Cake), a cake made from layered vanilla biscuits with chocolate between known in english as Hedgehog slice

== See also ==
- Black Peter (disambiguation)
