= British bulldog (game) =

Playground game and outdoor sports

British Bulldog
- Players: 20–30
- Playing time: 15–20 minutes
- Skills: Physical fitness, group energy, social skills, developing trust

British Bulldog is a tag-based playground and sporting game, commonly played in schoolyards and on athletic fields in the UK, Canada, South Africa, Australia, and related Commonwealth countries, as well as in the U.S. and Ireland. The object of the game is for one player to attempt to intercept other players who are obliged to run from one designated area to another. British Bulldog is characterised by its physicality (i.e. the captor inevitably has to use force to stop a player from crossing) and is often regarded as violent, leading it to be banned from many schools due to injuries to the participants.

The game is a descendant of traditional chasing games recorded from the 18th and 19th centuries, which partially evolved into collision-sport-related games during the early 20th century by the inclusion of lifting and drifting tackling techniques. In a sport's historical context, like its predecessors, British Bulldog has been used as a skill-and-drill device to reinforce and further develop locomotion skills fundamentally vital to American football, rugby, association football, hockey and related team sports.

== Name and regular use ==
"...boys today are able to begin playing football under competent adult organization, instruction and supervision. But the principle of participation was the same on the old-fashioned corner lot. We might start out with Pom-Pom-Pull-Away (we called it Blackman, I think), which is a tag game, but before long we'd be tackling. Nor did we need a ball to get the ball rolling in something more like football. A bundle of rags would do and our cross-tag and Blackman background would suggest a run-and-tackle game."

— Chet Grant (1892–1985) on how Black Man and Pom-Pom-Pull-Away turned into tackle games in the context of football.

While the game of British Bulldog is a conglomerate of different sources and pre-existing rules, the origin of the name is not entirely clear. In his book The Nation's Favourite, Guardian author Mathew Clayton (Free University of Glastonbury) clarified that, unlike other games, British Bulldog did not emerge until the 1930s. According to Cambridge District Scouts the game has been practiced under that name since then at several British Scout meetings.

Around that time, the game is mentioned in various newspapers, e. g. in February 1933 in The Kingston Whig-Standard, Ontario, Canada, and in April 1934 in the Londonderry Sentinel, Derry, Northern Ireland.

One of these early sources dates back to 1 March 1934. In an article from the Hartlepool Northern Daily Mail, it is described how Cub Scouts managed to lift a player off the ground as they shouted "British Bulldog!" In the Buckinghamshire Examiner from 15 June 1934, British Bulldog has been called "the most popular of all games" among the Scouts. Sources appear throughout England, always in connection with the Boy Scout movement, especially from the area of Great Yarmouth (Norfolk).

After spreading northward, British Bulldog has been recorded in Roxburghshire and Stirlingshire, Scotland, several years later. Falkirk Herald stated that the game "was successfully tried out in the dark" by the Scouts, which soon became a variation of the game ("British Bulldog in the dark").

In December 1942, Burnley Express in Lancashire reported a modified form of the game, incorporating rules of rugby football. More details appeared in 1949, when the rule of lifting a person was gradually displaced in favour of football tackling.

Although the game has already been known in the United States under different names, and possibly originated there from earlier decades, the name 'British Bulldog' was adopted by the Boy Scouts of America, likely during the turmoil of World War II. At the time, the national emblem of British Bulldog not only represented the economic and political strength of the British Empire but has also been applied to Winston Churchill, characterizing a person of sheer will and fortitude and a staunch antagonist against the Nazi regime.

British Bulldog can be seen as a sort of elementary version of rugby, that "thug's game played by gentlemen" as it was once memorably described. Its patriotic title suggests the ultimate playground test of true pluck and grit, of the kind that once built the Empire and inspired victory over Nazi Germany.

— Caroline Sanderson: "British Bulldog"; The Games We Played.

Apart from that, extensive game descriptions in connection with the name 'British Bulldog' did not appear in scientific treatises and periodical literature until the 1940s (e.g. in January 1941 in a dissertation by athlete Winston Alexander McCatty in the Canadian journal The School, Secondary Edition, published by the Ontario College of Education, University of Toronto, and in June 1944 in Boys' Life magazine in an article by William "Bill" Hillcourt, Boy Scouts of America).

In the U.S., the game spread slowly. While Scout troops in Tulsa, Oklahoma or Bluffton, Ohio were still playing their own school ground game of 'Black Man', Boy Scouts in Paterson, New Jersey had been practicing British Bulldog since the second half of the 1940s. The Daily Republican newspaper (Monongahela, Pennsylvania), published on 13 May 1949, proclaims that "a new game entitled British Bulldog was introduced to the Scouts".

== Basic description ==
Most commonly one or two players – though this number may be higher in large spaces – are selected to be the "bulldogs". The bulldogs stand in the middle of the playing field. All remaining players stand at one end of the area (home). The aim of the game is to run from one end of the playing field to the other, without being caught by the bulldogs. When the players are caught, they become bulldogs themselves. The last player is the winner and starts the next game as bulldog.

=== Location ===
The playing area is flexible—it can be played on a street, a playground, between cloisters, in a large sports hall or on an area of a playing field—though there is no set size of the pitch nor set number of players as long as there is enough space for the participants. The selected location consists of one main playing area, with two 'home' areas on opposing sides (similar to the try-zone areas used in rugby or American football). The home areas are usually marked by a line or some other marker.

=== Rounds ===
Each game of British Bulldog consists of a sequence of rounds, and it is usual to play a number of games one after another with different players as bulldogs each time. The game is initiated with a single player (or sometimes two) chosen as bulldog, standing between the home areas. The rush (also known as 'open gates' or 'stampede') is started by the bulldog shouting the phrase "British Bulldog!". The other players run across the field simultaneously, and once they left their home area the bulldog(s) must attempt to catch them. The players caught become bulldogs as well. The round is then repeated in the opposite direction until all players have become bulldogs.

In the later stages of the game the bulldogs will outnumber the remaining players, which can make captures especially rough as many bulldogs attempt to capture individual players.

=== Capture ===
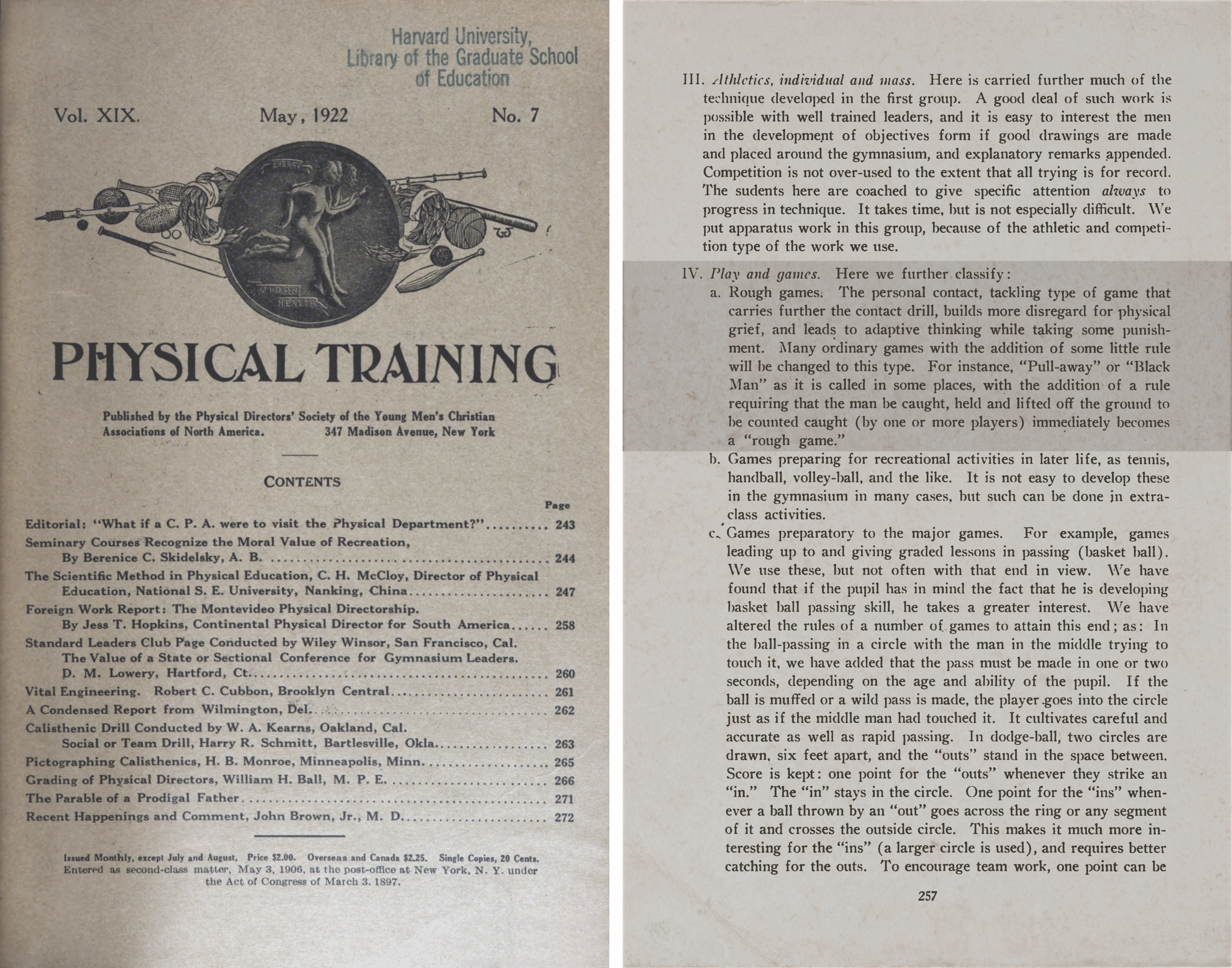
Early Lift-up variant, published in May 1922 in The Scientific Method in Physical Education by Charles Harold McCloy. Book pages from Physical Training, Volume 19, Issue 7, New York 1922.

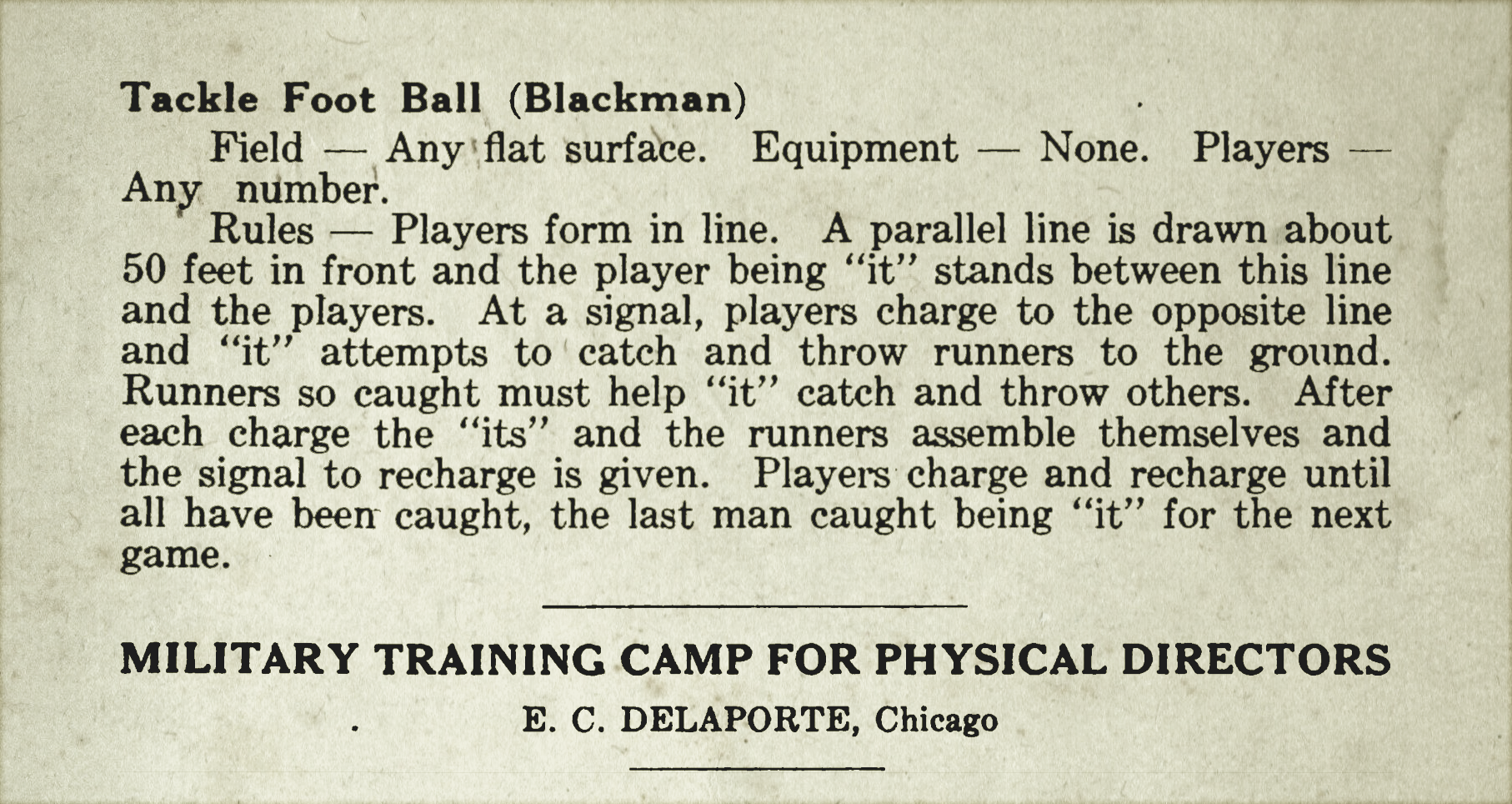
Prototype of British Bulldog from October 1918. A variation of the game of Black Man, taken from the Manual of Physical Training and Recreation in Army Camps, Mind & Body Publ. Co., Minnesota 1918.

Commonly, a player is caught by either being lifted off the ground by the bulldog or being tackled and held stationary, while the bulldog exclaims a phrase (e.g. "British Bulldog!" or "British Bulldog; one, two, three!"). If the runner can escape before the phrase is complete, or if they are able to continue moving (if being held stationary is required), then they are not considered to be caught.

Since the early 20th century, capture by tackling or lifting was a well-known feature of chasing and "running across" games such as Black Man and Pom-Pom-Pull-Away, although tackling has become more common than lifting. The tackle variant is sometimes referred to as 'Take-down Bulldog'.

The name "British Bulldog', and the rougher elements of lifting or throwing down, seem to have become the norm during the twentieth century. Earlier references appear under different titles ...

— Steve Roud: The Lore of the Playground.

One of the predecessors of 'Take-down Bulldog' was described in 1935 by Elmer Dayton Mitchell and Bernard Sterling Mason in the widely received publication Active Games and Contests under the name 'Tackling Pom-Pom-Pull-Away'. The book is primarily concerned with tag, running and combat games and provides further instructions of exercises solely connected to sports such as soccer and rugby football, basketball, baseball, and hockey. In this context, 'Take-down Bulldog' can be considered a football version of traditional chasing games.

Tagging is a characteristic feature of many games—even games of high organization such as baseball or football. Tagging and escape from being tagged is either the sole or at least the primary object of the game.

— Elmer Dayton Mitchell, Bernard Sterling Mason, Active Games and Contests, 1935.

Alternatively, the runners also become bulldogs if they cross a boundary equivalent to a touch-line. It can be a valid method of capture for a bulldog to force a runner over the boundary.

If the runners successfully enter the opposing home area without being captured, they are considered 'safe'. The bulldog(s) may usually catch any number of players in a single rush, all of whom become bulldogs.

=== Winning ===
The aim of the game for the bulldogs is to catch all the players as quickly as possible, whilst the aim for the other players is to stay uncaught for as long as possible. The last player to be caught is usually considered the winner.

== Traditional predecessors (18th and 19th centuries) ==
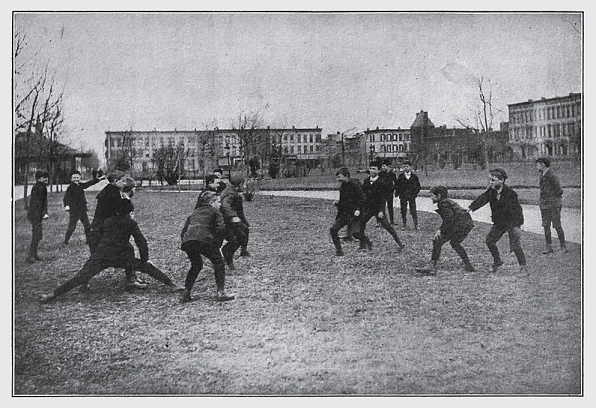
Schoolchildren playing a game of tag. Photo from 1909.

British Bulldog is a descendant of a range of games from the 18th and 19th centuries, which were widespread in Western and Central Europe (UK and Germany in particular) and later – in the course of emigration – in North America and Australia.

In contrast to British Bulldog, many of these ancient games were strongly connected to mythical and superstitious subjects.

"Ghosts and evil spirits still play their roles in the games of children though the adult members of society may no longer believe in them... Many of the games played by children contain traces of very ancient and even primitive beliefs and practices: water worship, the foundation sacrifice, the symbolism of colours, the efficiency of spittle as a fuga daemonum, the witch, the Black Man, crossing fingers to avoid being taken prisoner, and many many others, all of them of interest to the ethnologist and the folklorist."

— Paul G. Brewster, The Study of Games, 1971.

Before British Bulldog became popular in the 1950s and 1960s, Black Man, Black Tom, Pom-Pom-Pull-Away, Chinese Wall, and Crows and Cranes were the favorite schoolyard and sporting games. Those games also used to be part of the physical education programs for boy scouts, football players and in public schools across the United States. Some of the games, especially Black Man and Pom-Pom-Pull-Away, had been systematically enhanced in the late 19th and early 20th centuries by the inclusion of tackling and lifting techniques and thus became progenitors of British Bulldog.

=== Black Man ===
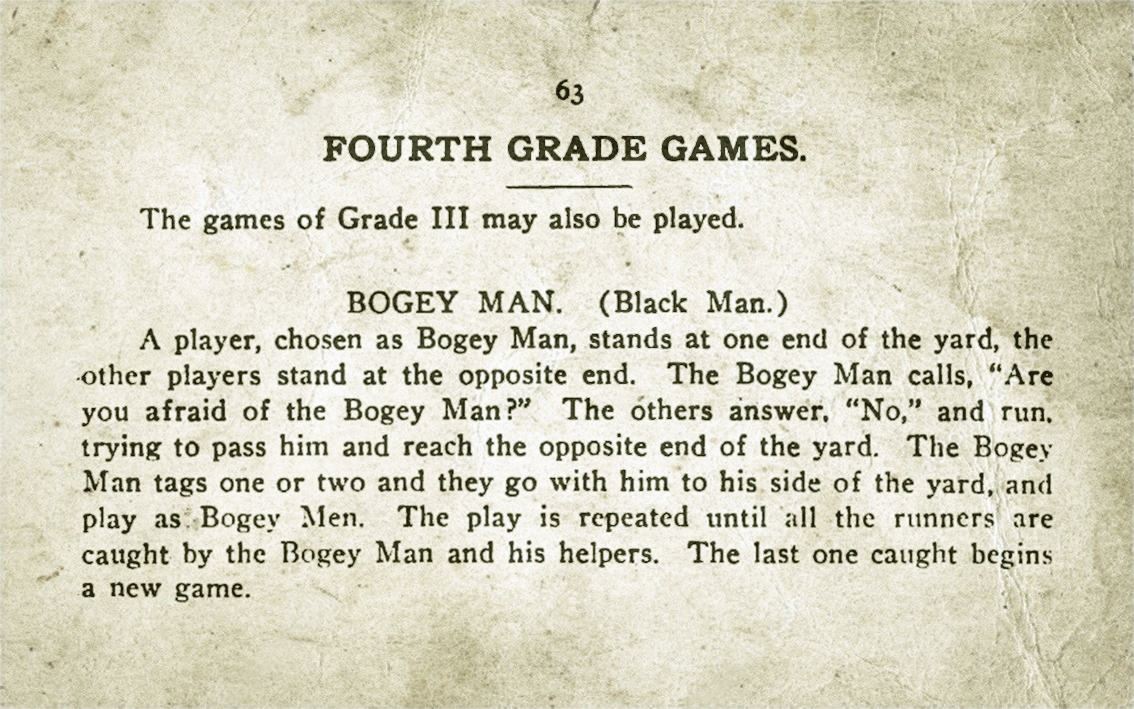
Description of the German game of Black Man by William Albin Stecher, Philadelphia 1907, from the Handbook of Graded Lessons in Physical Training and Games for Primary and Grammar Grades

Black Man (Der schwarze Mann), sometimes called Bogey Man, is a traditional German game and one of the oldest games in the line of Western European chasing games. It was described in 1796 by Johann Christoph Friedrich GutsMuths. It draws on ancient "plague games" in which the catcher epitomizes the Black Death. Everyone he touches becomes a bearer of the plague. In a broader sense, the character in the game represents death itself. The game ends in the triumph of the Black Man, whose power goes on increasing with each new capture.

"In Europe in the Middle Ages the game is reputed to have been connected with the Dances of Death, the idea being that the "blackman" in the middle represented [the God of] Death and would catch his victims... In the same vein, the game has been associated with the old demonic cult figures of a lower European mythology."

— Brian Sutton-Smith: The Folkgames of Children, 1972

The game of Black Man spread across the globe by the rise of the German Turner movement with Friedrich Ludwig Jahn as its iconic figure. An early translation of the game by Karl Ludwig Beck was published in 1828 in Northampton, Massachusetts in the book A Treatise on Gymnastics. The game was brought to Australia by German settlers, and has been mentioned by Gustav Adolph Techow in the Manual of Gymnastic Exercises, published in 1866 in Melbourne.

In the UK and Canada, Black Man was partially known as Black Peter (not to be confused with the card game) and has been regarded as a "primary rugby game". According to figureheads such as Steve Owen and Chet Grant, Black Man was an integral component of American football exercises. Other prominent players include Bernard Darwin, Dwight D. and Edgar N. Eisenhower, Daniel Carter Beard, Annette Kellerman and Luther Halsey Gulick Jr. who have mentioned the game of Black Man in their literary works and (auto-)biographies. It also appears in several books by Dorothea Frances Canfield.

==== Description ====
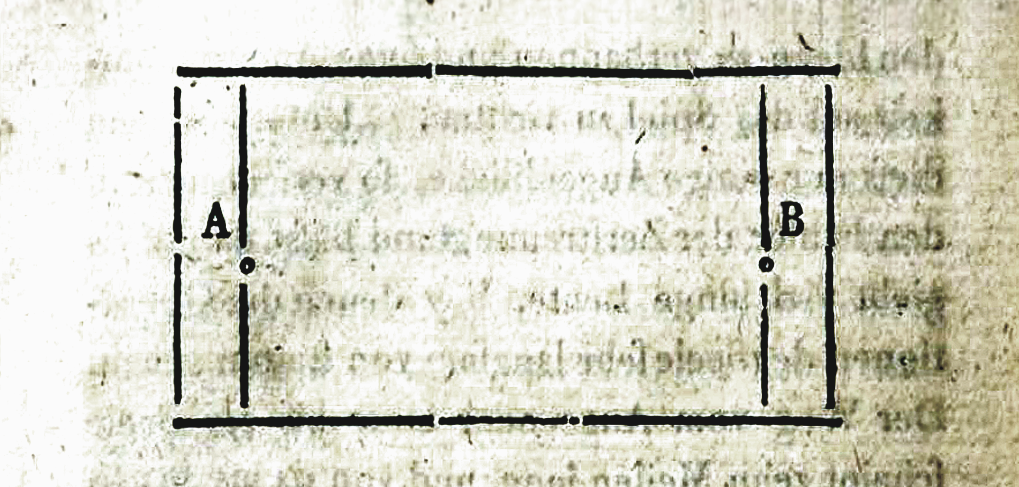
Fountain pen sketch from 1796 showing the oldest known match field drawing of the German game of Black Man (Wer hat Angst vorm schwarzen Mann?) by J. C. F. GutsMuths, Schnepfenthal, Germany

The playground is divided into three fields: two small opposite goals and one long middle field required for the chasing process. The distance between the goals can be increased according to the ability and the number of players. The players choose their goals, one of which the Black Man takes (Field A), while all the other players line up on the opposite goal (Field B). The Black Man calls out: "Who is afraid of the Black Man?", whereupon the other players yell: "No one!" and start for the opposite goal without being caught by the Black Man, who simultaneously leaves his goal to chase the players. With three slaps on the shoulder or back, and the call "One, two, three!", the Black Man must try to catch as many of the players as possible while on their way to the opposite goal. Every player tagged joins the Black Man and helps him tag the others. The Black Man and his helpers may join hands to catch the remaining players (a rule repeatedly described as Bound Hands). Anyone who runs beyond the boundaries of the playing field to evade the approaching Black Man is considered caught. The game continues until all have been caught. The last (sometimes the first) one caught becomes the Black Man in the new game. Alternatively, if the last remaining player runs through three rounds undefeated, he is allowed to choose a player to be Black Man for the next game.

Only the Black Man asks the questions. The advanced dialogues are:

Variant 1

Question: "Who is afraid of the Black Man?"
Answer: "No one!"
Question: "What will you do when the Black Man comes?"
Answer: "Run through like we ought to do!"

Variant 2

Question: "Are you afraid of the Black Man?"
Answer: "No! (Not of you!)"
Question: "What will you do when the Black Man comes?"
Answer: "Rush through like we always do!"

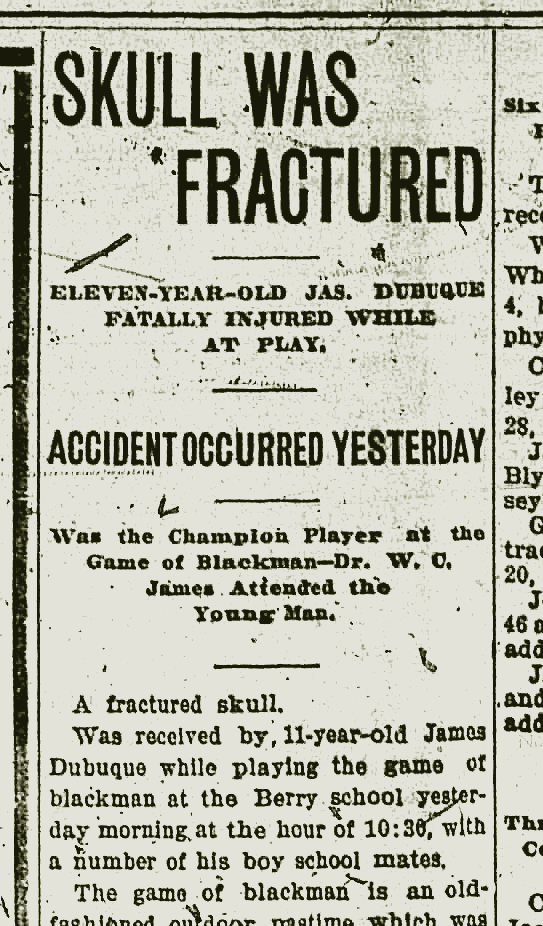
Newspaper article from 24 November 1899, describing the deadly head injury of a young boy caused by a football "pile-on" during a game of "Black Man"

Due to the risk of significant injuries (e. g. if the children crowd too close to one another, accidents occur as they turn and run), Black Man was originally intended to be played by boys only. In the late 19th century the game also became a part of the physical education of girls in public schools, although it became more and more highly controversial.

"At the beginning of the school the only outdoor game that the children played was "black man," a game that stimulated vulgarity, called out roughness and brutality, and allowed too much mauling of one another."

— Evelyn Dewey, New York City, April 1919.

Comparable games and derivatives from the 19th century were Black Tom, Blackthorn, Pom-Pom-Pull-Away, Rushing Bases (also known as King Cæsar) and Hill Dill, mostly with different dialogues and with the catcher placed in the middle of the field.

=== Black Tom ===
Black Tom is a street game from the New York area. It was described in 1891 in Stewart Culin's publication Street Games of Boys in Brooklyn, New York. The game has also been mentioned in 1899 in Kate Upson Clark's book Bringing up Boys. A Study.

In the game the player chosen as "Black Tom" takes his place in the middle of the street, all the others on the pavement on one side. When the catcher calls "Black Tom" three times, the other players must run across to the opposite curb, and may be caught, in which case they must join Black Tom in capturing the rest.

Unlike the other chasing games the catcher may attempt to confuse and trick the players by shouting a false signal, such as "Blue Tom" or "Red Tom". Any players who attempt to run on such a signal are automatically caught and join the catcher. A player is also considered caught if another catcher gives the correct signal. Only Black Tom is authorized to call out the phrase. The first one caught is Black Tom for the next game.

The method of confusion later became the basic element in the team game of Crows and Cranes.

In Daniel Carter Beard's work The American Boy’s Book of Sport from 1896 the main character Black Tom is described as a malicious fiend, an "ogre", possibly related to the game of Black Man. In Germany, Austria and Switzerland, in the context of the Dance of Death, Schwarzer Knabe (black 'tom' or black 'fellow') was a synonym for the Grim Reaper. In several game and education manuals of the late 1920s, both Black Man and Black Tom appeared temporarily in the form of hybridized game descriptions.

=== Blackthorn ===
Blackthorn, a game from the region of Lancashire, Derbyshire and Sheffield similar to Fox and Dowdy and King Cæsar, was played in the 19th and 20th century. It is named in 1837 in the book An Historical and Descriptive Account of Blackpool and its Neighbourhood by William Thornber.

A base is marked off at either end of the playground, leaving a wide space in the middle. One of the children volunteers for, or is chosen, "it" and takes up his position in the middle between the two bases, one of which serves as a gathering point for the rest of the players. The following dialogue then takes place:

Question: "Blackthorn, Blackthorn.
Blue milk and barley-corn.
How many sheep have you today?"
Answer: "More than you can catch and carry away!"

After finishing the rhyme, the players start running across from base to base. "It" endeavors to catch and hold one or two of them temporarily while counting to ten. The captives made join "it" and become assistants in the capture. While the number of catchers increases, the remaining players reform at the opposite end of the playground and start again. The game continues until all have been caught. In Liverpool a similar game was known by the name Shepherds, in which the catcher and his assistants join hands to catch the rest of the players.

In another variant of Blackthorn one set of children takes its position behind a line, the other set stands opposite, facing them. The players then run all together toward each other's line. Anyone caught before reaching the goal must piggyback his catcher to the goal, where he takes his place as an additional catcher. In Suffolk this game was called Rakes and Roans.

The game of Blackthorn may be a possible predecessor of British Bulldog, as it was described in 1897 as a tackling variation after "carrying away became obsolete", but it only appears in a fictional school story by author Don Ralpho in The Boy's Own Paper. The actual existence of this variation remains unclear.

=== Chinese Wall ===
Chinese Wall is a 19th-century combat game from Germany invented by Karl Wassmannsdorff. It was first published in 1866 in the sport journal Deutsche Turnzeitung. An English translation appeared in 1897 in the U.S. in the Mind & Body gymnastics magazine. It is primarily a game of organized play and usually supervised by an instructor.

Two parallel lines are marked off from side to side straight across the center of the playground, leaving a narrow space between them of about ten feet in width, which represents the building ground for the wall. On each end of the playground, a line is drawn across parallel to the building ground at a distance of fifteen to thirty feet, which marks the goal for the runners. One of the players is chosen to create the wall on the building ground, and takes his place upon it, facing all the other players who line up in one of the goals. At an agreed signal (e. g. "Start!" or a similar call), the runners must cross the building ground to reach the opposite goal, the builder endeavoring to tag as many as possible during their rush without leaving the boundaries of the marked ground himself. All the runners caught that way become a "stanchion" of the wall and assist the builder in trying to capture the rest of the players. After crossing the ground several times, the remaining runners must attempt to break through the increasing wall, which gradually becomes denser due to the growing number of catchers. Anyone refusing to break the wall is automatically considered caught. The game ends when all of the runners have been caught, the last player taken being the "builder" for the next game.

=== Fox and Dowdy ===
A catch-and-hold game, related to King Cæsar and Blackthorn, was recorded in 19th century Lancashire and Warwickshire under the name of Fox and Dowdy (or Fox-a'-Dowdy). It has been mentioned in 1875 in the Notes to The Sad Shepherd (The Works of Ben Jonson – Vol. VI) and is played across a lane or similar area. In this version, the person who is "It" catches the runners by holding them and reciting the phrase "Fox a' Dowdy—Catch a Candle!".

In King Edward's School, Birmingham the same game was known as Bacca (or Action!). In this version, the home areas were at both ends of the cloisters. The catcher in the middle must hold the players who run across and say the phrase "One, two, three, caught, tobacco!" to capture them. The phrase was the source of the game's name. In a similarly titled version called Baccare, the rush is triggered by the "leader" of the runners calling "Baccare!" or by any of the runners being tricked by one of the catchers into saying it. An example given is a catcher asking "What does your father smoke?", to which a player might answer "Bacca!" (as a short form of "tobacco"), thus triggering the rush.

Another local variant recorded in Marlborough, Wiltshire, was called Click. In this game, being the catcher was known as "going Click". The catcher(s) caught other players by holding them while saying the phrase "One, two, three, I catch thee; help me catch another!". If the last remaining player successfully made the run between the home areas three times without being caught, they could nominate a person to "go Click" in the next game; if they failed then they had to do it themselves.

=== Hopping Bases ===
A variant of the English game of King Cæsar (Rushing Bases) is Hopping Bases that has been described in 1844 in the book The Boy's Treasury of Sports, Pastimes, and Recreations.

In the game there is an area in the centre between the two home areas called the "castle". The catcher is known as the "king" and starts in the castle; anyone caught by the King becomes one of the king's "soldiers". The non-catcher players must hop between the home areas with their arms folded across their chests. The king and soldiers capture other players by barging into them or forcing them to put both feet down. If the king puts both feet down, they have to return to the castle before they can capture any more players.

There is also a team version of Hopping Bases, related to Prisoner's Base and Cops and Robbers, in which players split into teams and each own one of the home areas. Players who are forced to put both legs down are captured by the other side and become "prisoners". Prisoners are placed in home area of the capturing team and can be rescued by a teammate hopping across the playing area and touching them; after which both the rescuer and rescuee are allowed to walk or run back to their own home area. The team with the most prisoners wins.

=== King Cæsar ===
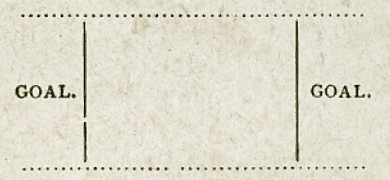
Playing area of Pom-Pom-Pull-Away and King Cæsar from 1890 by John Denison Champlin Jr. & Arthur Elmore Bostwick, similar to the field sketches of Black Man and related chasing games

King Cæsar (also known as King Senio and Rushing Bases) dates back to the first half of the 19th century. It has been mentioned in 1831 in The Olio journal and was fully described in 1844 in the London book The Boy's Treasury of Sports, Pastimes, and Recreations.

Two bases are marked out, one at each end of the playground. The elected player (chosen by lot or counted out) is called "King" and places himself midway. All the other players take up position in one of the bases. At a signal, the players attempt to dash across the intervening ground and avoid being caught by the King who strives to hold one of them as they rush to the other base. The King accomplishes the task by patting his captive on the head while calling out the phrase "I crown thee, King Cæsar!" (alternatively "One, two, three, i crown thee. Now thou art in Senio's fee!"). The players caught join the center and must assist King Caesar in endeavouring to crown the rest. When the kings outnumber the remainder they may enter the bases and try to drag out the players to crown them. The last child captured being King Cæsar for the next game.

In Inverness-shire, the game was called Rax (Latin rex = king) and King of Scotland. In the game, the "King" triggers the rush with the phrase "Rexa-boxa-King", or simply "Rexa-boxa", and seeks to "caron" (crown) his captives.

Another local variation played in Nairn, that had been recorded in the late 19th century, is Cock. In this version, the catcher is known as "Cock" and attempts to capture (or "croon") his opponents by putting his hand upon a player's head.

=== Pom-Pom-Pull-Away ===
A game once played since the 1860s at the Northeastern Seaboard is Pom-Pom-Pull-Away (also known as Pom-Pom-Peel-Away). It has been mentioned in 1862 in Diocletian Lewis' treatise The New Gymnastics, published in the American Journal of Education. Heavily inspired by the German system of gymnastics, Lewis developed a new system of exercises meant for people with physical impairment and reduced mobility.

Similar to the German game of Black Man, the runners in Pom-Pom-Pull-Away start in one of the home areas but with the catcher standing in the middle of the playground, as standard. There is no named player and the rush starts with the catcher calling out the phrase "Pom-Pom-Pull-Away; come away or I'll fetch you away!". The players then are usually caught by being touched on the back or shoulder while running across, although the rules may differ among regional variants. All of those caught in the run assist the catcher in tagging the others. The first player to be caught starts as the catcher in the next game.

A variant of this game called Hill Dill has also been recorded. In this version the only difference is the phrase which is "Hill Dill, come over the hill; or else I'll catch you standing still."

=== Red Rover ===
Red Rover, initially a New York chasing game like Black Tom, has been described in 1891 in Stewart Culin's publication Street Games of Boys in Brooklyn, New York.

One person, the "Red Rover", is chosen as catcher and stands in the middle of the street, while the other players form a line on the pavement on one side. He calls any boy he wants by name: "Red Rover, Red Rover, let [player's name] come over!", and that boy must then run to the opposite sidewalk. If he is caught as he runs across, he must help the Red Rover to catch the others. When the Red Rover catches a player, he must call "Red Rover!" three times or he cannot hold his captive. Only the Red Rover has authority to call out for the others by name, and if any of the boys start when one of the captives who is aiding the Red Rover calls him, that boy is considered caught. The game is continued until all are caught. The first one caught is Red Rover for the next game.

In the 20th century, the game changed into a team game, incorporating rules of Kettenreißen (literally chain breaking), a German game that has been described in 1862 in the education handbook Merkbüchlein für Turner, published by Eduard Angerstein. In 1949 Warren E. Roberts of the Indiana University Folklore Institute tried to delineate the particularities of the traditional Red Rover and the team game of the same name and phrase. In the latter, a group of players split into two even-numbered teams on both sides of the playing field. The teams face each other at about 15–20 yards apart. Then the players within each team join hands. One team picks out a player they want to come over. The selected player runs to the opposite team and tries to break through the human chain. If successful, he can choose one of the defeated team members and bring him into his own group. If he can't break the chain, he becomes a member of the opposite team.

== Variants and related games (20th and 21st centuries) ==
=== Bullrush ===
Bullrush, in Auckland also called Kingasini, a cacography of King O'Seenie alias King Senio, is commonly played in Australia and New Zealand, combining rules similar to those in the games of Red Rover and British Bulldog. Initially, the name Bullin rush was not applied to a game but to the rushing crowd within the game.

Possibly due to the culture of very hard contact sports that are normalized in the cultures of Australia and New Zealand, this version tends to be played in a very rough fashion, with full tackling instead of tagging, multiple catchers attacking one runner and piling onto them while they are on the ground ('stacks-on'), and the requirement that a runner be completely subdued on the ground to be considered caught. Minor injuries are common, and are considered a normal part of play.

Two parallel goal lines are drawn about 20 to 30 metres apart. One chosen person, the catcher, stands between the goals; the other players line up behind one of the goal lines in front of the catcher. The latter calls a person by name, who must run from one goal to another. A person who is tackled and subdued on the ground has to call out the name of the next runner. The player who safely reaches the other side has the choice to call out "Bullrush!" and everyone else then starts running across the open space, trying to avoid being tackled and brought to the ground by the catcher(s) who must try to stop as many players as possible. Everyone caught becomes a helper of the catcher and has to join the catcher in the middle of the field. The first (or last) person caught becomes the catcher for the next game.

Both the catcher and the successful runner are authorized to call out "Bullrush!" for starting the run. The runners caught are tackled to the ground by the catcher who calls "1–2–3 – You’re in the middle with me!".

A tackle variant played in some suburbs of Wellington during the 1970s was called "Downhill Bullrush". Runners begin at the top of a steep, heavily forested hill, and catchers stand about half-way down the hill.

=== Crows and Cranes ===
Crows and Cranes, also known as Black and Blue, is an early 20th century team game brought from England to the States by American soldiers. It was described in November 1918 in The Youth's Companion magazine. Its roots go back to a German combat game called Day and Night or Black and White, published in 1796 by J. C. F. GutsMuths, which in turn is based on the ancient Greek game of Ostracinda.

In the middle of the playground two groups of players of equal numbers are formed in parallel lines about one yard apart. A player, chosen as instructor, designates one line as the "Crows" and the other as the "Cranes". All players stand facing the instructor, who takes his place apart from the game (e. g. about two yards from one end of the lines). The goals are located thirty feet back of each line. The instructor starts the game by calling (and drawling) the consonants of each group's name: "K – r – r – r – r...", and then suddenly runs it off into either "Crows!" or "Cranes!". The aim of the game is to think ahead and react immediately to the possible situation of being the chaser or being chased. The players of one group, whose name the instructor calls, turn quickly and run toward their goal while the other players cross over the middle of the playground and chase them, tagging as many as possible. Those tagged must join the opposite group (in another variant they have to leave the game). The instructor can switch the call while the chasing process to reverse the action. If the Crows were chasing the Cranes and the instructor calls "Crows!", all the players must switch roles and directions. After the first round the players go back to the starting point and build new lines. The game continues until one group is successful by retaining a larger number of players at a given time.

=== Golden River ===
A children's game from the Edwardian era commonly played in the United Kingdom. The player who is "It" may variously be known as Mr. Crocodile, Farmer, Jack, Charlie, Old Witch or Mr. Jellyfish. A recurring feature in the game is a (golden) river which the players must cross.

One player chosen to be the catcher pretends to guard the river and takes his place in the middle of a designated area. All the others line up in front of the "guardian" 30 feet away and call out "Please, Mr. Crocodile, may we cross your golden river?". The guardian responds and lays down conditions, e. g. by choosing a colour or something else: "You may not cross my river unless you... [are wearing blue; have green eyes; have laced shoes etc.]." If the players have something that matches the criteria they are allowed free passage across the river without being caught. Those left behind must rush across the river trying to evade the guardian. Players caught must leave the game (or alternatively assist the guardian in capturing the others). When the players ask if they may cross the river from the opposing side, the guardian sets a new condition, e. g. another colour, including a colour that none of the players are wearing, and the rush across the river is repeated. The game continues with a specific condition each time (such as age, hair colour, owning a pet, having a certain letter in the name) until all the players have been caught.

Different rhymes have been documented across the United Kingdom, for example "Farmer, farmer, may we pass, over the hills and over the grass?", "Please, Mr. Crocodile, may we cross the water, in a cup and saucer?" and "Old mother witch, may we cross your ditch?", and even more macabre variants such as "Please, Jack, may we cross your golden water, to see the Queen's (or King's) daughter, who fell into the water, one hundred years ago?".

=== Octopus ===
A game related to freeze tag is called Octopus. It was described in 1957 in the book Children in Action. Physical Education Instruction Guide.

In this version one (or two) player(s) are chosen as "octopus(es)" and stand in the middle while all the other players line up as "fishes" at one side of the playing area. The catcher calls out "Octopus!" and all the players must run across the field to the other side of the boundary without being caught. If they are caught, they are rooted to one spot and become seaweed. Within the next round they then try to tag the other players, using only one foot to pivot and waving their arms without leaving their tagging spot.

Any person who runs across the boundary of the playing field is considered caught and the catcher can decide where that person has to take place. The last person to be tagged is the winner.

=== Sharks and minnows ===
Another variant of pom-pom-pull-away (swimming pom-pom-pull-away) called sharks and minnows is played in swimming pools or across a marked playing area on land. In Annette Kellermann's book How to Swim, it is referred to as water blackman.

One player is selected as the "shark" and starts at one side (or alternatively in the middle) of the pool while the "minnows" (i.e. runners) take place on the opposite area. In each round, the minnows must swim from one side of the pool to the other without being "eaten" (touched or tagged) by the shark(s). All the minnows who are tagged above the water's surface while crossing the pool then join the shark for the next round. The game finishes when only one, or zero depending on local variation, "minnow" is left. The minnow that was tagged first then becomes the shark in the subsequent game. In some versions, minnows cannot be tagged if they are fully submerged under water. The shark can either wait for a minnow to surface for a breath, or can try to pull him or her to the surface for a tag.

In the traditional variant of swimming pom-pom-pull-away, already mentioned in the early 20th century, the catcher calls out Pom-Pom-Pull-Away! (Let the fishes swim away!) to start the game.

"Water blackman or pom-pom-pull-away is played in a pool much as in a schoolhouse yard. One swimmer is the "blackman" and all the others race across the pond. The first man caught is blackman for the next game – after all the swimmers are caught."

— Annette Kellermann, Water Games, 1918.

In Germany, the game is known as Der Seeräuber (buccaneer) and Der Weiße Hai (white shark).

== Gallery ==
Game descriptions

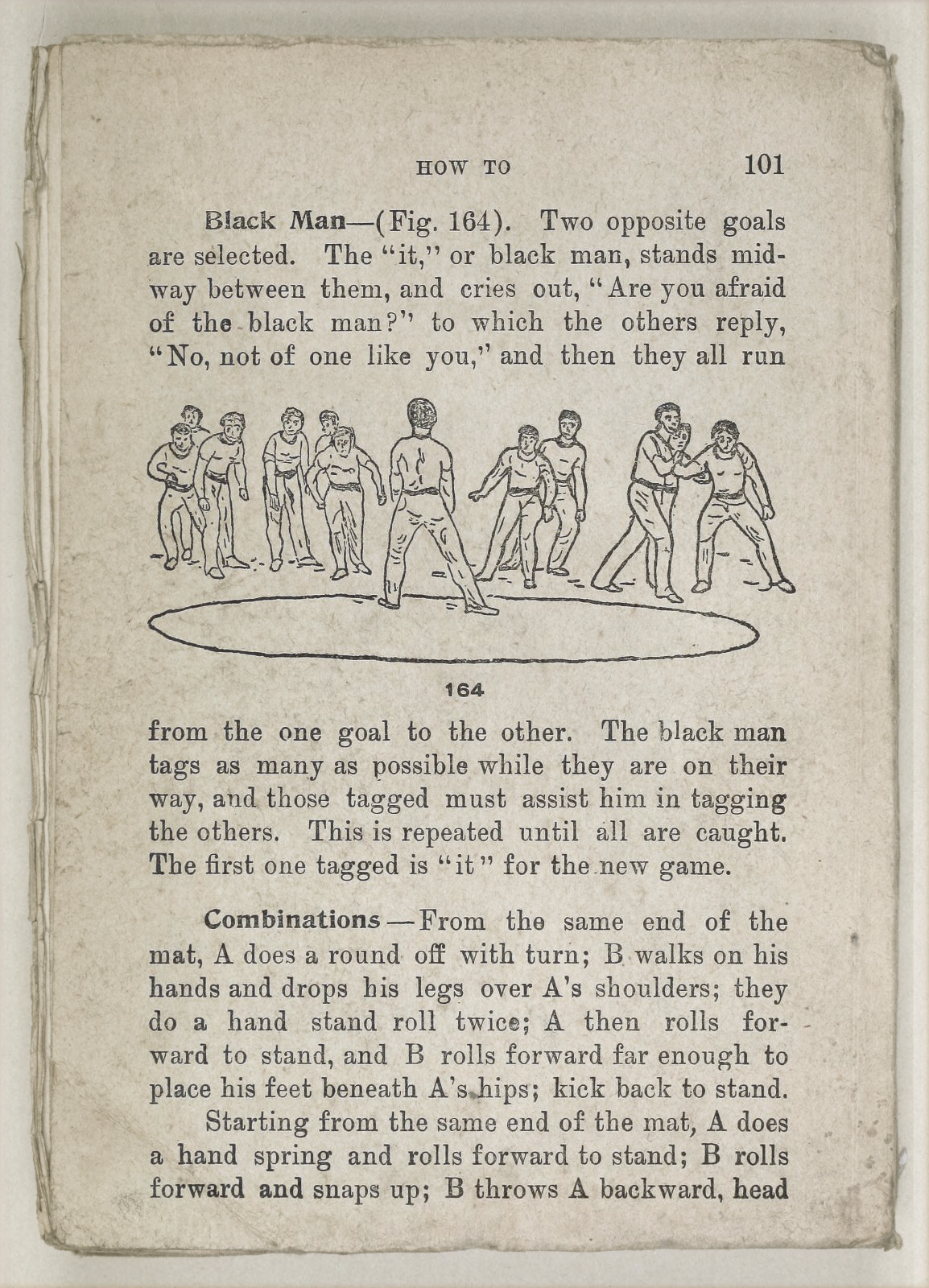
Black Man – Game description from 1899 by Horace Butterworth

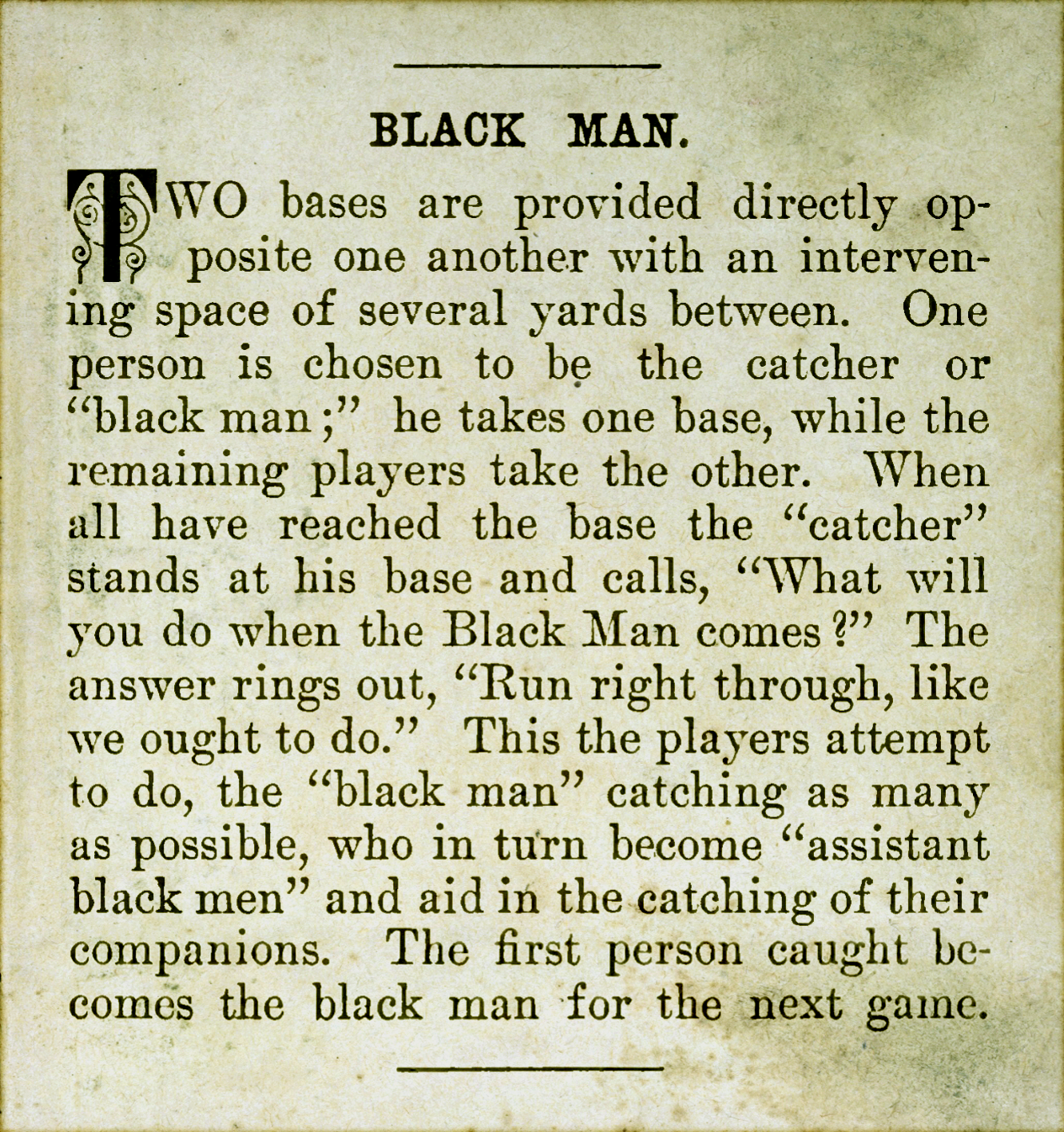
Black Man – Game description from 1902 by Nelle M. Mustain

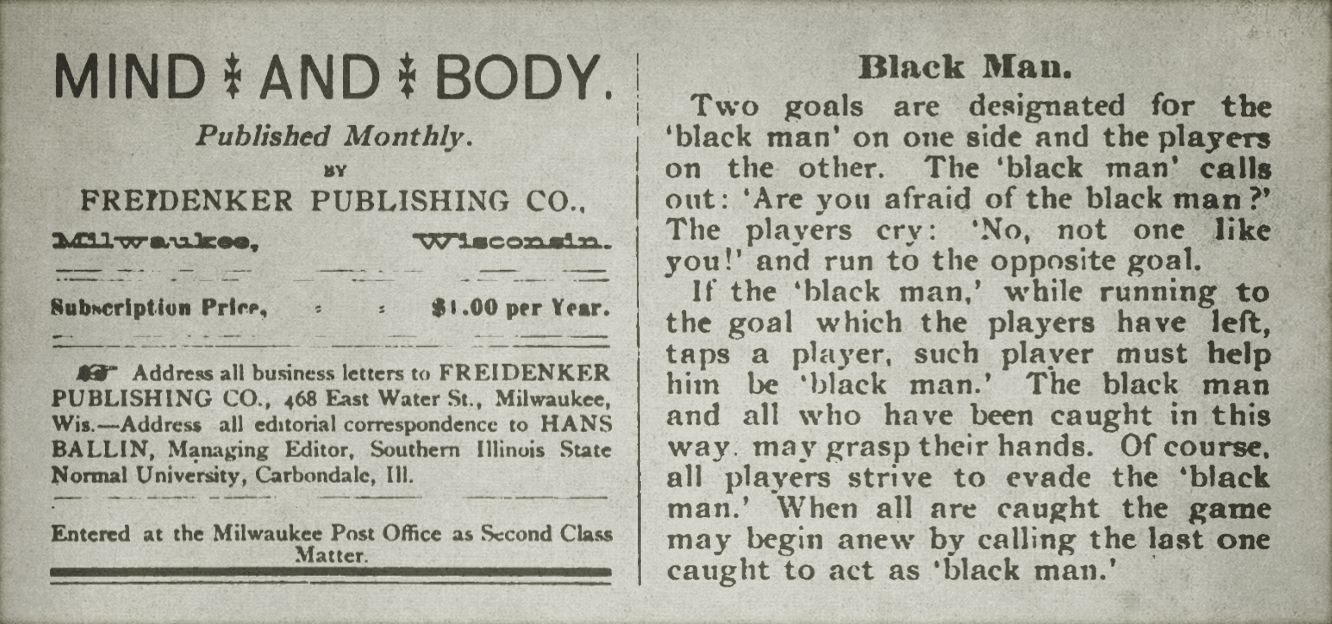
Black Man – Game description from Mind & Body, published in 1895

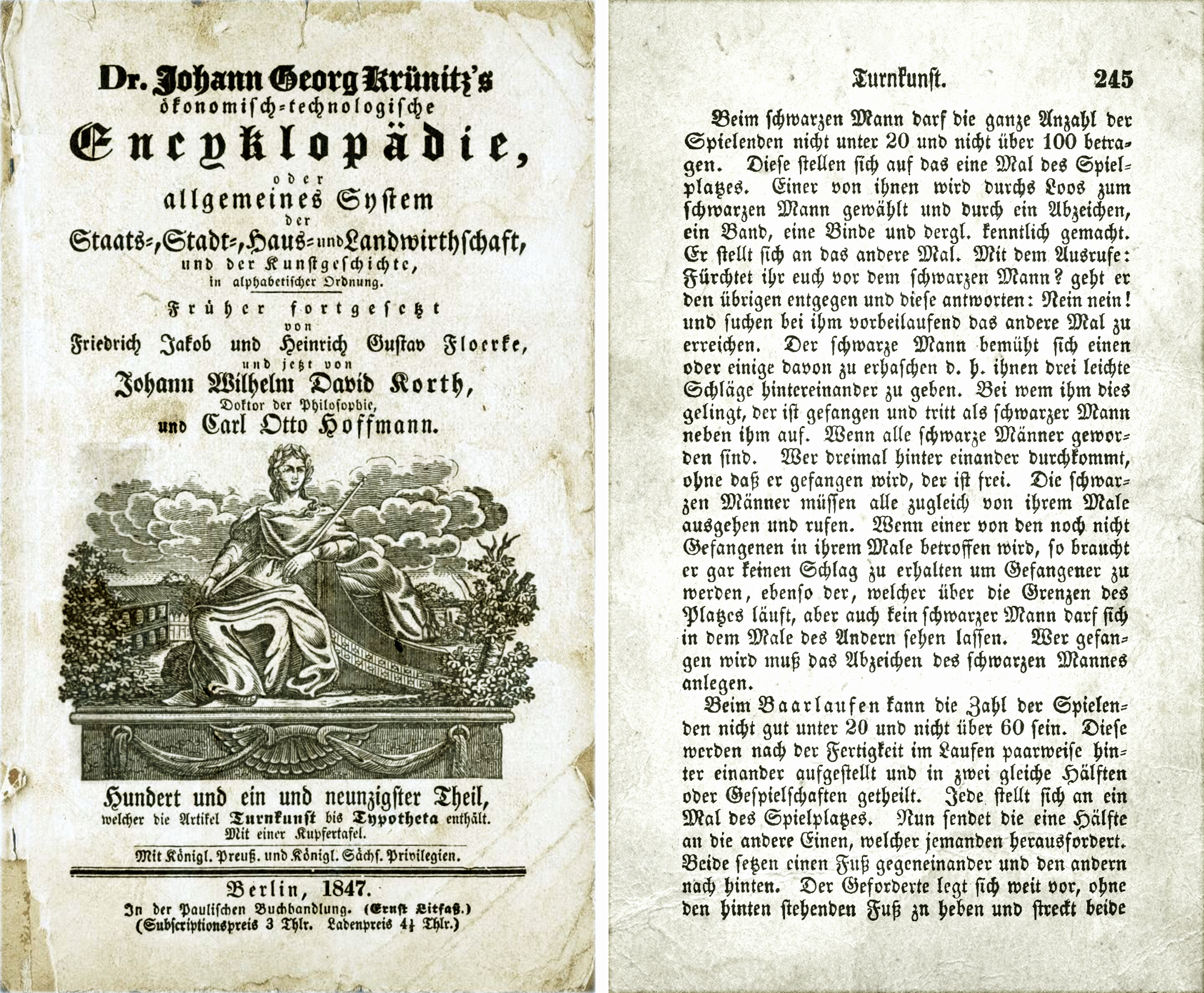
Black Man – German game description from 1847

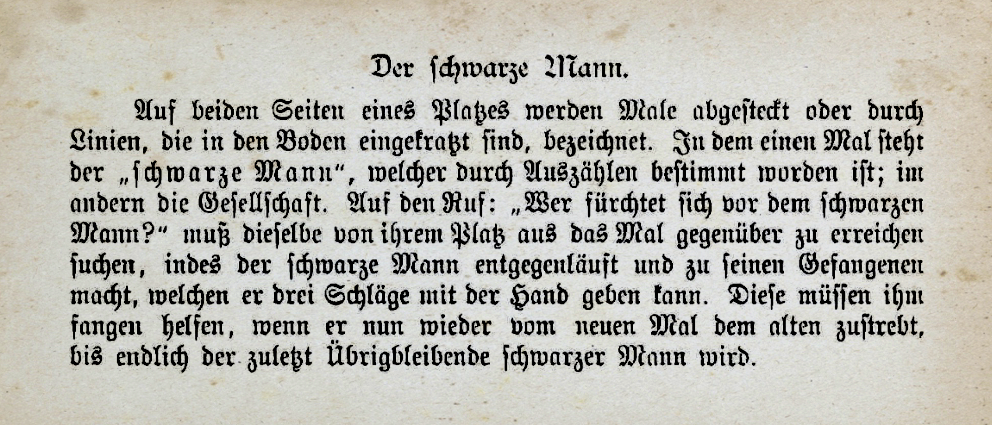
Black Man – German game description from 1893

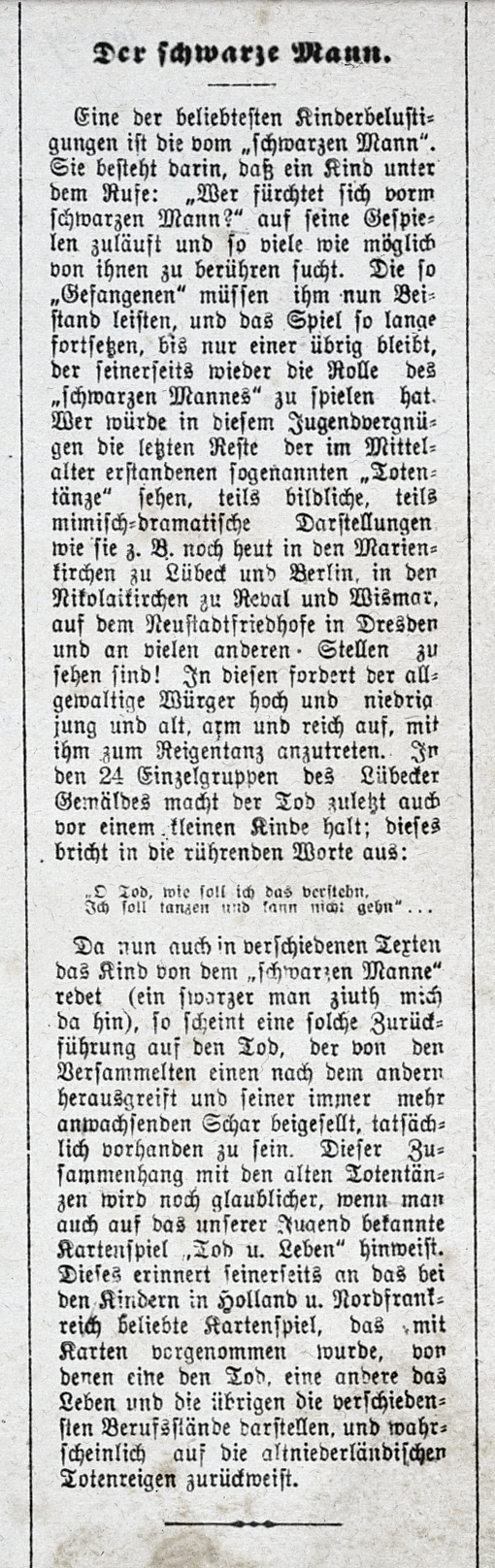
Black Man – History of the game in the Chicago newspaper Abendpost, published in 1912

== Background ==
"...British Bulldog is not just a rough house, but more or less a declaration of war."

— Boy Scout Notes, Derbyshire, January 1941.

The game is normally played by children and offers an interesting means of letting off energy and involves rugged physical contact. It appeals to competitive spirits but at the same time produces ad-hoc team activity with all the "losers" endeavouring to bring the "non-losers" to the ground. The strongest, most athletic competitors will find it extremely difficult to win British Bulldog as the number of bulldogs grows. Parents tend to deplore the game since it results in muddied and even torn clothes, bruises, bloody noses, knees and elbows and sometimes tears (when played on tarmac) but both boys and girls participate in it.

As a game of physical contact that results in a mêlée of people attempting to drag others down to the ground, British Bulldog bears some similarity to rugby. The game when played in Australia tends to be particularly rough, with the version known as Pile-ons or Cockylora/Cocky laura being common.

== Controversy ==
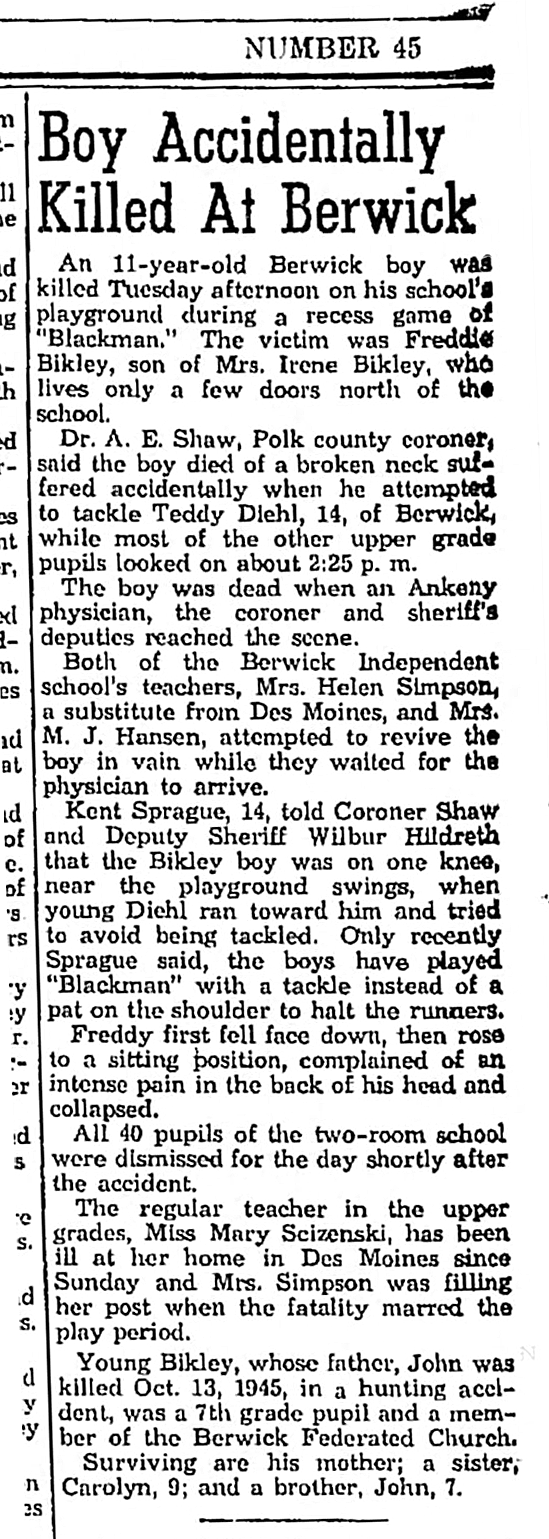
Newspaper article from April 5, 1951, describing the fatal accident of an 11-year-old boy while playing "Black Man" as a tackle game (cf. British Bulldog) instead of playing it as a regular tag game

The physicality of the game has caused it to gain some notoriety and to be banned in a number of school playgrounds.

In England and Wales, despite the Local Government Association's 2008 encouragement of traditional playground games such as British Bulldog, more than a quarter of teachers surveyed in 2011 said the game had been banned at their schools. Its rough-and-tumble nature resulted in numerous broken bones when it was popular in the 1970s and at least one spinal injury was reported in the June 1985 British Medical Journal, as well as the death of an eight-year-old child in Twickenham in 2013, who collided with a player of British Bulldog while playing a different game.

"His neck was flexed forcibly while his head was against the floor, and immediately after the injury he had severe pain of the cervical spine ... [which] shows that games such as British Bulldog can be as dangerous as rugby football."

— British Medical Journal, June 1985

== See also ==
- Atya patya

== Bibliography ==
British Bulldog

- William Hillcourt: British Bulldog. In: Boys’ Life. The Boy Scouts’ Magazine. Boy Scouts of America, New York City, June 1944, p. 20.
- William Hillcourt: Games and Contests: British Bulldog. In: Scoutmaster's Handbook. A Manual of Troop Leadership. Boy Scouts of America, New Jersey 1959, pp. 443–444.
- Iona Archibald Opie, Peter Opie: British Bulldog. In: Children's Games in Street and Playground. At the Clarendon Press, Oxford 1969, pp. 138–141.
- David Booth: British Bulldog. In: Games for Everyone: Explore the Dynamics of Movement, Communication Problem Solving and Drama. Pembroke Publishers Ltd., Markham, Ontario, June 1986, ISBN 0-921217-03-X, p. 27.
- Susan Hill: British Bulldog. In: Games That Work. Co-Operative Games and Activities for the Primary School Classroom. Eleanor Curtain Publishing, South Yarra 1992, ISBN 978-1875327164, p. 80.
- Huw Davies: British Bulldog. In: The Games Book: How to Play the Games of Yesterday. Michael O'Mara Books Ltd., London 2008, ISBN 1843173042.
- Caroline Sanderson: British Bulldog. In: Kiss Chase and Conkers: The Games We Played. Chambers Harrap Publishers Ltd., Edinburgh 2008, ISBN 9780550104274, pp. 15–16.
- Steve Roud: British Bulldog and Other Chasing Games. In: The Lore of the Playground. Random House Books, London 2010, ISBN 9781407089324, pp. 37–42.

Black Man

- William Albin Stecher: Black Man. In: Gymnastics. A Text-Book of the German-American System of Gymnastics. Lee and Shepard Publishers, Boston 1896, pp. 317–318.
- Rebecca Stoneroad: Black Man. In: Gymnastic Stories and Plays for Primary Schools. Physical Exercises for the First Two Years of School. Daniel Collamore Heath & Co.; Publishers, Boston 1898, pp. 84–85.
- Horace Butterworth: Black Man. In: How To – A Book of Tumbling Tricks, Pyramids and Games. Clarendon Publishing Co., Chicago 1899, p. 101.
- Nelle M. Mustain: Black Man. In: Popular Amusements for in and out of Doors. Lyman A. Martin, Chicago 1902, p. 235.
- Michigan Department of Public Instruction (Hrsg.): Who’s Afraid of the Black Man? In: Physical Training. A Course in Physical Training for the Graded Schools of Michigan. Superintendent of Public Instruction, Lansing 1919, p. 55.
- Johannes Nohl, Charles Humphrey Clarke: Who Is Afraid of the Black Man? In: The Black Death. A Chronicle of the Plague. Harper & Brothers Publisher, New York und London 1926, p. 259.

Black Tom

- Stewart Culin: Black Tom. In: William Wells Newell: Journal of American Folk-Lore: Street Games of Boys in Brooklyn, N. Y. Volume IV, Houghton Mifflin Company, Boston and New York 1891, p. 224.
- Jessie H. Bancroft: Black Tom. In: Games for the Playground, Home, School and Gymnasium. The MacMillan Company, New York, December 1909, pp. 54–55.
- Dorothy La Salle: Black Tom. In: Play Activities for Elementary Schools. Grade One to Eight. A. S. Barnes and Company Inc., New York 1926, pp. 68–69.
- Elmer Dayton Mitchell, Wilbur Pardon Bowen: Black Tom. In: The Practice of Organized Play. Play Activities Classified and Described. A. S. Barnes and Company Inc., New York 1929, pp. 97–98.
- Elmer Dayton Mitchell, Bernard S. Mason: Black Tom. In: Active Games and Contests. A. S. Barnes and Company, New York 1935, p. 269.
- Dorothy La Salle: Black Tom. In: Guidance of Children Through Physical Education. The Ronald Press Company, New York 1946, pp. 259–260.
