= Red Rover =

Children's game

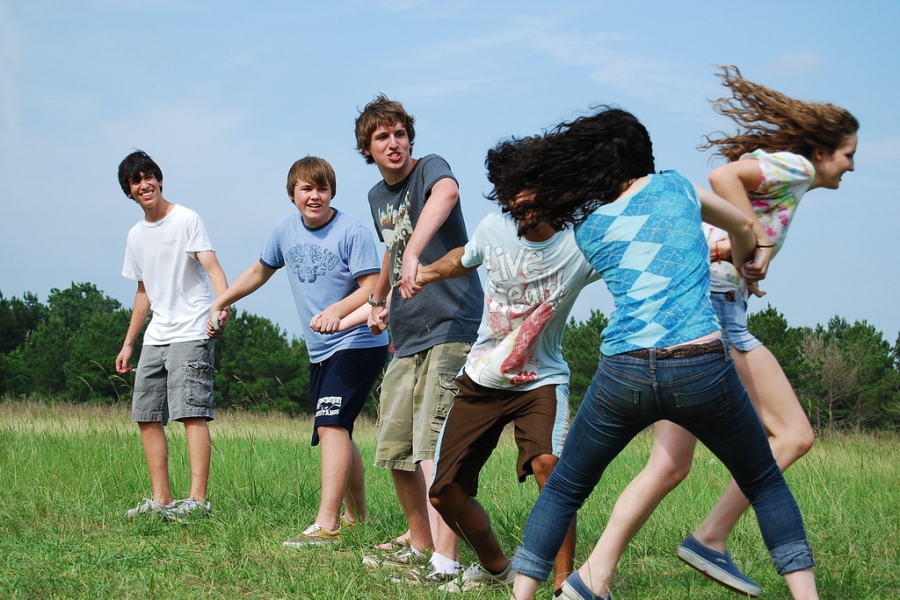
Youths playing the game

Red Rover (also known as the king's run and forcing the city gates) is a team game played primarily by children on playgrounds, requiring 10+ players.

The game has changed over several decades, evolving from a regular "running across" game, with one single catcher in the center of the playground, to a combat game with two opposing teams. The change basically consisted of merging pre-existing rules from other games with those of the original Red Rover.

== The original Red Rover ==
=== Origin of the game ===
Originally, Red Rover was a regular tag and running game with several players on one side and one person (the "Red Rover") placed in the center of the playing field. The person in the center calls, "Red Rover, Red Rover, let [player's name] come over!" to challenge and catch one of the players who tries to reach the other side of the playing area. If the Red Rover succeeds, they both return to the center. Each player tagged joins the center and helps tag the others.

According to Katherine Barber, the name of the game could be based on the novel of The Red Rover by New York author James Fenimore Cooper, in which a pirate ship by that name ravages the British seas.

The game was first recorded in New York in 1891 in Stewart Culin's publication Street Games of Boys in Brooklyn, N. Y.. Until the 1940s, various descriptions of this version of Red Rover have been published, e.g., in 1907, in Dorothea Frances Canfield's book What Shall We Do Now? Five Hundred Games and Pastimes. In the book, Canfield compared Red Rover with the German game of Black Man.

In 1903, Red Rover was mentioned in Some London Street Amusements by Edwin Pugh, published in George Robert Sims' book Living London – Vol. III. It also appeared in 1916 in London Street Games, a book by Norman Douglas, although British folklorists Iona and Peter Opie stated that no record of Red Rover has been found in the United Kingdom before 1922.

The game of Red Rover was sometimes confused with the British game of Warning!, and in the U.S. with a game called Red Lion, which are both tag games but with different playing instructions. The confusion was mainly due to the similarity of names (in Moray, Scotland, the game of Warning! was primarily known by the name of Johnny Rover). Parallels, on the other hand, exist with Bar the Door, a game that was described in 1901 by Robert Craig Maclagan in The Games & Diversions of Argyleshire.

=== The missing link ===
In the second half of the 1930s, the game rules started to change. A variation, representing the missing link between the original Red Rover and the team game, was published in 1945 in the United States by Neva Leona Boyd in the Handbook of Games.

The game combines the rules of the traditional pastime, such as calling and tagging players individually by a catcher placed in the center of the playground, with those of the team game, which comes into being when the increasing number of players caught in the middle forms a chain by grasping each other's hand. The chain must be broken by the remaining players. These rules were very similar to those in the German game of Chinese Wall. Years before, in 1938, rules for Red Rover had already been adopted from Chinese Wall, e. g. the marking of a narrow field in the center of the playground, which the catcher is not allowed to leave.

By the end of the decade, the transformation process of the game was fully completed. In March 1949, Warren E. Roberts of the Indiana University Folklore Institute explained that two versions of Red Rover exist. In his article Children's Games and Game Rhymes, Roberts tried to delineate the particularities between the traditional Red Rover and the combat game of the same name and phrase. Since the beginning of the 1950s, Red Rover has been described primarily as a team game. It remained unclear why the playing rules had been modified over time.

== Red Rover as a team game ==
=== Early descriptions ===
==== Germany ====
The later combat version of Red Rover is of German or Chinese origin. An early description of the game appeared in 1862 in the German education handbook Merkbüchlein für Turner (memorandum book for sportsmen) by Eduard Angerstein under the name Kettenreißen (literally chain breaking or chain bursting). Alternative names are Kettensprengen and Kettenbrechen.

The same team game was described in 1884 – entitled Der König schickt Soldaten aus (the king sends out soldiers) – in the sixth edition of Spiele zur Übung und Erholung des Körpers und Geistes by J. C. F. GutsMuths, published in Germany by Otto Schettler in co-operation with Friedrich Wilhelm Klumpp and Justus Carl Lion.

In 1896, an English translation of the game named The King's Run was published in the United States by William Albin Stecher in the scholastic manual A Textbook of the German-American System of Gymnastics. Further descriptions of King's Run followed until the late 1920s in several American books on physical education.

==== China ====
A similar variant has been recorded in China in 1901 by professor Isaac Taylor Headland of the Peking University under the name Forcing the City Gates. In this game, one of the children's groups sings a rhyme before sending a boy to the enemy's line.

In his article Child Life in China published in the Delineator magazine from January 1901, Headland annotated that this game was well known to the majority of American children. He also mentioned numerous other games played by Chinese boys, among them Blind Man's Buff, Hide and Seek, Prisoner's Base, Black Man, Hockey and Shinny.

Forcing the City Gates was also described in 1909 in the recess guide Games for the Playground, Home, School and Gymnasium by Jessie H. Bancroft, using the game instructions of King's Run as a basis.

=== Game instructions ===
The game is played between two lines of players (usually called the "North" and "South" team, although this does not relate to the actual relative locations of the teams), positioned approximately thirty feet apart with hands or arms linked together. The game starts when the first team—in this example, the North team—calls a player out, by saying the line, "Red Rover, Red Rover, let [player on opposite team] come over!" (alternatively "..., send [player's name] right over!" or "..., I call [player's name] over!").

The immediate goal for the chosen one is to run to the North team's line and break the chain (formed by the players' hands). If the chosen one successfully breaks the chain, they may select either of the two "links" broken by the successful run, and take the link to join the South team. If the selected person fails, they join the North team. The South team then calls out for a person on the North team, and the play continues.

When only one player is left on a team, they must try to break through a link. If the player does not succeed, then the opposing team wins; otherwise, the player gets a player back for their team.

== In other languages ==
In Russia and some former USSR countries, this game has been known as "Ali Baba".

In Kyrgyzstan, this game called "Ак терек - көк терек" (Ak terek - kök terek: White poplar - green poplar).

In Hungary, the game is named "Adj, király, katonát!" (King, give us a soldier!) and in Serbia as "Јелечкиње, барјачкиње" (jelečkinje, barjačkinje, i.e., city crier and flag bearer).

In Romania, the game is called "Țara, țara vrem ostași" (Country, country we want soldiers). In Republic of Moldova, the line is "Împărate, împărate, dați-ne un soldat!" (King, king, give us a soldier). In Slovakia, it is known as "Kráľu, kráľu, daj vojačka!" (King, king, give a soldier!).

In the Czech Republic, the game is known as "Král vysílá své vojsko" (The king sends out his army), with the difference that each team chooses which of its members will attempt to break the opposite team's line, rather than sending the member called by the other team.

== Prohibition ==
Like British Bulldog, the game of Red Rover has been banned by many schools because of the risk of potential physical harm. This negative reputation has a long history.

In a description from the book Illustriertes Spielbuch für Knaben, published in Germany in 1864, game collector Hermann Wagner stated that the game of Kettenreißen (chain breaking) is perceived as violent. Its practical execution often causes peevishness among the boys. Therefore, any kind of beating and punching and the use of brute force with the help of arms and legs should be strictly prohibited.

== See also ==
- Chinese Wall
- Crack the Whip
- Hana Ichi Monme (a similar Japanese game)
- How Many Miles to Babylon?
- Tag (game)
