= British Bulldog =

British Bulldog may refer to:

- British Bulldog, an alternative name for the Bulldog
- British Bull Dog revolver, a type of revolver popular in the late 19th and early 20th centuries
- British Bulldog (game), a tag-based playground and sporting game
- The British Bulldogs, a professional wrestling tag-team of two British cousins (Davey Boy Smith and Dynamite Kid)
  - Davey Boy Smith, the professional wrestler known in singles competition as "The British Bulldog"
    - Davey Boy Smith Jr., professional wrestler and son of Davey Boy Smith, also performs under "The British Bulldog" moniker
- The Great Britain men's national Australian rules football team, nicknamed the "British Bulldogs"

== See also ==
- Old English Bulldog, an extinct breed
