= Hana Ichi Monme =

Japanese children's game

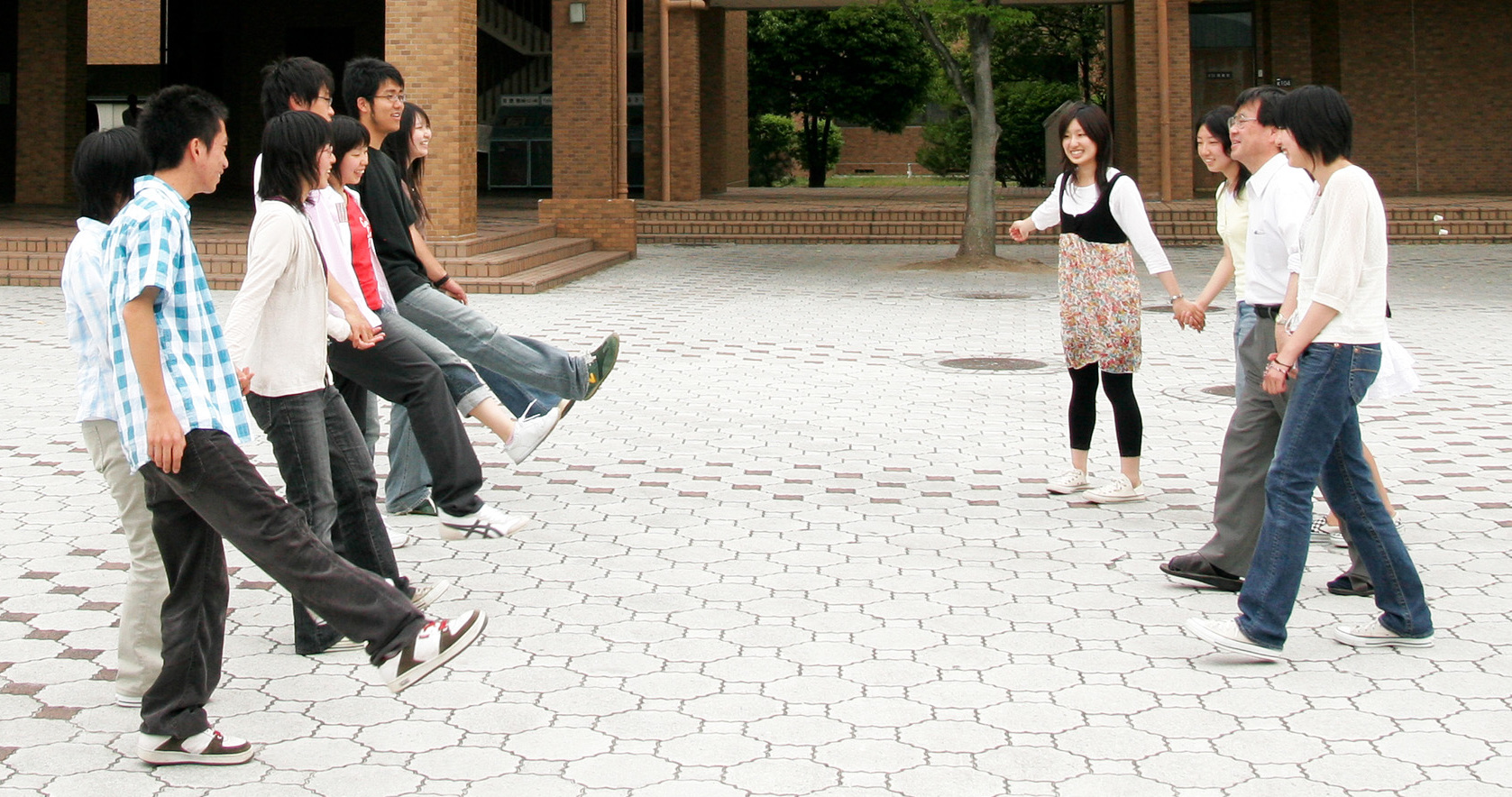
Adults play a game of Hana Ichi Monme

Hana Ichi Monme (花一匁) is a traditional Japanese children's game. The game is similar to the game Red Rover in the Western world, and is often played in kindergartens and elementary schools.

The name "Hana Ichi Monme" means "a flower is one monme", where a monme is a historical (Edo period) Japanese coin with a value of 3.75 grams of silver.

Other traditional Japanese children's games include Kagome Kagome and Dahrumasan ga Koronda. Many games have songs that go with them.

== Play ==
Children playing Hana Ichi Monme with their teacher, 2017

Players split into two groups, and the members of each group hold hands, so that the teams face each other in two lines. One group steps toward the other in the rhythm of a song that is used only for the game, and the other steps back so that the team lines remain parallel. In each phrase of the song, the team that is stepping back changes, and the team creates a move that associates a swing.

Each time the song ends, the team leaders step forward and do janken, a Japanese version of rock paper scissors. The winner goes back to his team, and they discuss who the team wants to add from the other team. After they have decided, they sing another song doing the same movement and announce the person they want. The game ends when one team loses all of its members.

=== Variant ===
In this variant, the two teams sing alternate lines from a song when advancing. As the word monme is sung, that team kicks into the air as if to kick the dirt into the opponents' faces.

(1) Katte ureshii hana ichi monme
(2) Makete kuyashii hana ichi monme
(1) Ano ko ga hoshii
(2) Ano ko ja wakaran
(1) Sōdan shiyō
(2) Sō shiyō

Translation:

(1) We're so happy we won, a flower is one monme
(2) We're so upset we lost, a flower is one monme
(1) We want that kid
(2) We don't know which kid you mean
(1) Let's talk about it
(2) Yes, let's

The children then huddle to choose a person from the opposing team and return in line to call out:-

(1) [Name] ga hoshii
(2) [Name] ga hoshii

Translation:

We want [name]
We want [name]

The two named children then step forward to janken. The loser joins the winning team's line. The game ends the same way.
