= Vieux garçon =

Card game

The jack of spades is the pouilleux - it cannot be discarded, as its partner the jack of clubs is not used in the game

Vieux garçon (lit. 'old boy') is a card game played with a standard 52-card pack from which the jack of clubs is removed. It is a game for two to eight players. It is of the same family as old maid and Black Peter.

The game is also sometimes called le Pouilleux ("scruffy"), Mistigri, Le Pissous, Le Puant ("stinker"), Pierre Noir ("black Peter") or Le Valet Noir ("Black Jack"),

== History ==
The game is mentioned as early as 1839, but its rules are first recorded as vieux garçon ("old boy") in 1853 by Lasserre, and may be derived from the German game of Black Peter whose rules are recorded as early as 1821 in Das Neue Königliche L'Hombre. Meanwhile, the English game of Old Maid or Old Bachelor was first described in 1835 by Leslie. All these games are probably much older and may be derived from simple gambling games in which the aim was to determine a loser who had to pay for the next round of drinks (cf. drinking game). They originally employed a pack of 32 or 52 French cards, the queen of hearts being removed in the case of old maid, or one or all of the jacks, leaving the jack of spades as the odd card in the case of vieux garçon or Black Peter. The player who is last in and left holding a single Queen or Jack is the "old maid", "vieux garçon" or "Black Peter" and would originally have had to pay for the next round or pay a forfeit.

In Tignes, in the French department of Savoie, the jack of spades is known in the local dialect as the grabyoula.

== Aim ==
The aim is to shed your cards in order to avoid being the last in. The last to hold the pouilleux ("scruffy one"), that is to say the jack of spades has lost.

=== Deal ===
The dealer deals all the cards, clockwise in threes, the last player to be dealt receives the last two cards. Cards may also be dealt individually, but still clockwise.

=== Discarding ===
Each player discards his same-coloured pairs (Hearts and Diamonds or Clubs and Spades) of the same value. A pair with differently-coloured suits - such as 7♥ and 7♠ - cannot be discarded in this way.

=== Play ===
The player with one card less than the others begins the game by drawing a card from his left-hand neighbour, without showing it to the other players. If this allows him to form a new pair, he immediately discards them. It is then the neighbour's turn to draw, always from the person to his left. The game continues in this way until all the pairs have been formed and there is only one card left, the pouilleux, because it is unable to form a pair with its counterpart, the jack of spades.

== Bluffing ==
Vieux Garcon or Pouilleux is a game of chance, there is no particular technique to increase your chances of winning. On the other hand, players with the pouilleux often have fun bluffing by highlighting a card from their deck to mislead whoever has to draw:

- Either this card is actually the pouilleux, in which case it should not be taken
- Or it is not, which means that the pouilleux is hidden among the other cards presented, but without being obvious.

Another bluff is to hold the cards more or less firmly, the picker abandoning a card that is held too loosely (because it is probably the Pouilleux that he wants to get rid of). Holding the Pouilleux firmly is therefore misleading.

== Variants ==
There are games, more suitable for children, in which the Pouilleux is represented by a grey cat named Mistigri, and the other cards are paired, often in a humorous way. This should not be confused with Mistigri, which is a different game.

=== Choice of pouilleux ===
For more suspense, you can randomly choose a card as the Pouilleux by removing it from the pack face down.

== Literature ==
- Das Neue Königliche L'Hombre (in German). Lüneburg: Herold and Wahlstab. 1821.
- Bibliographie de la France (in French). Paris: Pillet Ainé. 1839.
- Bazaar, Exchange and Mart. Vol. 29. 1883.
- Duch, Célestin; Béjean, Henri (1998). Le Patois de Tignes (Savoie). Grenoble: ALADVT.
- Green, Charles M., ed. (1884). The Friend of All. New York: S.W. Green's Son.
- Lasserre (1853). Nouveau Manuel Complet des Jeux de Calcul et de Hasard (in French). Paris: Roret.
- Leslie, Eliza (1835). The Girl's Book of Diversions. London, Dublin, Glasgow, Sydney: Tegg.
