= Old maid (card game) =

Card game

Old Maid
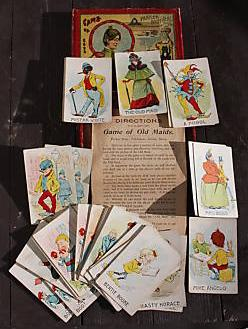
- 19th-century pack
- Origin: United States
- Type: Shedding game
- Players: 2-12
- Skills: Matching and pairing
- Age range: 4-10
- Cards: Typically 31, 51 or 53
- Play: Clockwise
- Chance: High

Related games
- Black Peter, Vieux Garçon
- Easy to play

Old Maid is a 19th-century American card game for two or more players, presumed to have derived from an old European gambling game in which the loser pays the other players.

== History ==
The rules of the game are first recorded in a book for girls by Eliza Leslie, who published them in America in 1831 and England in 1835 under the names Old Maid (when played by girls) or Old Bachelor (when played by boys). However, it may well be older and derived from the German game of Black Peter, whose rules are recorded as early as 1821. Meanwhile the rules of the French game, Vieux Garçon, first appear in 1853. All these games are probably ancient and derived from simple gambling games in which the aim was to determine a loser who had to pay for the next round of drinks (cf. drinking game).

These games originally employed a pack of 32 or 52 French cards, the queen of diamonds or jack of spades typically being the odd card and the player who is last in and left holding a single queen or jack becoming the "old maid", "vieux garçon", or "Black Peter" depending on the game. The term "old maid" predates the game and referred to a childless or unmarried woman. In its day it was seen as the equivalent of "old bachelor".

Apart from reprints of Leslie, the game largely disappeared from the literature during the mid-19th century but experienced something of a revival in the 1880s. (Note: For example in England in 1882 and in America in 1884) This was boosted in England when proprietary cards emerged with nursery rhyme figures in 1883 under the name Merry Matches which, according to Bazaar, Exchange and Mart was a "newly invented game", despite its obvious derivation from Old Maid.

== Rules ==
=== Earliest rules (1831) ===
The following is a summary of the rules by Leslie (1831):

Old Maid is a card game and any number may play. Three queens are removed from a standard pack of 52 cards, leaving the fourth queen representing the "Old Maid". Players may cut for deal, the one cutting the highest card dealing first. Aces are high. The cards are dealt equally all round and face down. The player to the left of the dealer begins by throwing down a pair of cards held in her hand e.g. two kings or two threes. The discards are placed face up in the middle of the table. If she is unable to discard a pair, she must draw a card from the player to her left who, for this purpose, lays her cards face down on the table. If the card drawn by the player whose turn it is pairs with one in her hand, she discards the pair; otherwise she keeps it and misses the opportunity to discard a pair. The turn then passes clockwise and players have the same options. The first player to shed all her cards wins the game. The rest continue to see who will be left with the Old Maid.

If the game is played by boys, it is called Old Bachelor and three knaves are discarded instead of three queens.

=== Modern rules (2011) ===
There are commercial card packs specifically designed for playing Old Maid, but the game can just as easily be played with a standard 52-card pack. The following rules are based on Arnold (2011), supplemented by other sources where indicated:

A standard pack is used (or two if more than six play) from which a single queen is removed. The cards are shuffled and all 51 are dealt out singly; it being irrelevant if some players have an extra card. Players discard any pairs dealt at the outset. If a triplet is held, two are discarded and one kept; if a quartet is held, two pairs are discarded. Play starts with the player to the dealer's left offering a fan of face-down cards to the next player on the left. That player selects a card and discards it by pairing or adds it to the hand. Play continues clockwise in this manner, players dropping out when they have no hand cards left. The player left holding the single queen is the 'old maid' and loses.

== Variations ==
- A specific card is removed, typically any Queen card, e.g. Queen of Hearts.
- A joker is added to the pack. This card acts as the Old Maid.
- A card is removed from the pack at random. The resulting unmatchable card, the Old Maid, cannot be identified as easily.
- The suit colours of a discarded pair must match: ♠ with ♣; ♦ with ♥.
- Players discard only after the dealer has taken a card.
- Players take a new card before giving one up. This can result in a player being stuck in "old maid purgatory", i.e. with one card and no way to get rid of it.

=== Merry Matches ===
"Merry Matches", a proprietary card game by Wyman & Sons of London, appeared in 1883. It was originally published as a black-and-white game, but a coloured version appeared in 1884. There were 31 cards, the pairs "to be wed" including: Tommy Tucker and Goody Two-Shoes, Little Jack Horner and Miss Muffet, Father Christmas and Mrs Bond, Jack and Jill, Little Boy Blue and Little Bo Peep, the Prince and Cinderella, Dr Faustus and Dame Darden, The Man all tattered and torn and The Maiden all forlorn, Simple Simon and Lucy Locket, Father William and Old Mother Hubbard, Little Red Riding Hood and Tom, Tom, the Piper's Son. The odd card was Mistress Mary. The aims were threefold: to wed as many couples as possible, to make a match between Father Christmas and Mrs Bond, and to avoid being left with Mistress Mary, the penalty for which was to give every other player 2 counters. The player who weds Father Christmas with Mrs Bond sweeps the pool and those making matches during the game receive "wedding presents" of 1 counter from each other player.

=== Scabby Queen ===
Scabby queen is a modern variation of Old Maid played with a standard pack of cards from which the Queen of Clubs has been removed. The player left with the "scabby queen" (♠Q) is the loser and receives a number of raps on the knuckles with the edge of the pack. The number of raps is decided by reshuffling the pack and getting the loser to draw a card. The player get the number of raps based on the face value of the card or, if it is a jack or king, 10 raps; if it is a queen, 21 raps. If the loser draws a red card, they receive soft raps; if a black card, hard raps. Scabby Queen is recorded in 2002 as a game played in Perthshire, Scotland, but also known as Raps in Derbyshire, Raps or Chase the Bitch in Staffordshire, and Executioner in Hampshire. In some parts of Britain, it is called Chase the Ace, but that is also the name of a different game.

=== Black Peter ===
The equivalent game in many European countries is known (in each country's own language) as "Peter" or "Black Peter", and is often played with special cards, typically 31 or 37, in which the odd one out is typically a chimney sweep or a black cat. The game can also be played with a standard 32-card pack from which a black jack is removed. The loser often gets a smudge on his or her face with a piece of soot or piece of burnt cork.

=== Regional variants ===
- Trinidad: Jackass. The ♦J is removed leaving the ♥J as the odd card. The player left holding it is the "jackass".
- Turkey: Papaz kaçtı ("Priest eloped"). As Old Maid, but king is removed instead of queen or knave.

== See also ==
- Donkey
- Happy Families
- Hearts

== Literature ==
- _ (1821). Das neue Königliche l'Hombre. Lüneburg: Herold & Wahlstab.
- _ (1882). Cassell's Book of Sports and Pastimes. London, Paris and New York: Cassell, Petter, Galpin.
- _ (1883). "Merry Matches" in The Bazaar, The Exchange and Mart, 26 September 1883, p. 336.
- _ (1884). The Furniture Gazette, Vol. 22. 25 October 1884.
- Champlin, John Denison and Arthur Elmore Bostwick (1890). The Young Folk's Cyclopædia of Games and Sports. New York: Henry Holt.
- Dawson, L. (1923) [reprinted 1980]. Hoyle's Card Games. Routledge. ISBN 0-415-00880-8
- Golick, Margie (1986). Reading, Writing, and Rummy. Markham, Ontario: Pembroke.
- Green, Charles M. (1884). The Friend of All. W. Greens's Son.
- Lasserre, Lebrun and Leroy (1853). Nouveau Manuel Complet des Jeux de Calcul et de Hasard. Paris: Roret.
- Leslie, Eliza (1831). The American Girl's Book. Boston: Munroe & Francis; NY: C.S. Francis.
- Leslie, Eliza (1835). The Girl's Book of Diversions. London, Dublin, Glasgow, Sydney: Tegg.
- Mulac, Margaret Elizabeth (1946). The Game Book. New York and London: Harper & Bros.
- Parlett, David (1992/96) Oxford Dictionary of Card Games. Oxford / New York: Oxford University Press.
- Roya, Will (2021). Card Night: Classic Games, Classic Decks, and the History Behind Them Black Dog & Leventhal Publishers. ISBN 9780762473519
- Sackson, Sid (1994). Card Games Around the World. Dover Publications. ISBN 0-486-28100-0
