= Peter Nikoll =

German gangster

Peter Nikoll (1771–1817) was a bandit leader from Mecklenburg who was beheaded for his crimes. His nickname was Black Peter.

== Life ==
Nikoll was born in 1771 in the Duchy of Mecklenburg and was involved in crime from an early age. In his later years he became a bandit chieftain who headed a powerful gang of robbers. Countless atrocities were committed under his leadership until he and his accomplices were eventually caught. Because of his reputation, he earned the sobriquet "Black Peter" (German: Schwarzer Peter) and, even after his death, "his deeds lived on in people's minds". The eponymous children's card game was said by one source to be named after him. In the 19th century this game was played in northern Germany in the long winter evenings. The loser was "Black Peter" who received a charcoal mark on the face and had to pay a forfeit.

Other sources, however, claim the card game was invented by Johann Peter Petri (1752–after 1812), a highwayman also nicknamed "Black Peter", who came from the Palatinate region.

== Execution ==
Nikoll was beheaded on 13 June 1817 in Glückstadt in the neighbouring Duchy of Holstein along with six of his fellow bandits; the remainder were sentenced to life imprisonment. Most died in gaol with the exception of one who was released by the King of Denmark in 1852 under the condition that he emigrated. In August that year, he arrived in New York where he published his version of the life of Black Peter in the New York Tribune.

== Literature ==
- Wander, Karl Friedrich Wilhelm (1873). Deutsches Sprichwörter-Lexikon: ein Hausschatz für das deutsche Volk, Volume 3. Leipzig: Brockhaus.
