= Black Pete =

Black Pete could refer to one of the following characters in fiction:

- Zwarte Piet, a character in folklore of Sinterklaas, in the Low Countries and parts of the Dutch Caribbean
- Pete (Disney), a Disney character and nemesis of Mickey Mouse
- Black Pete, a character in the television series Our Flag Means Death.
