= Schoolyard =

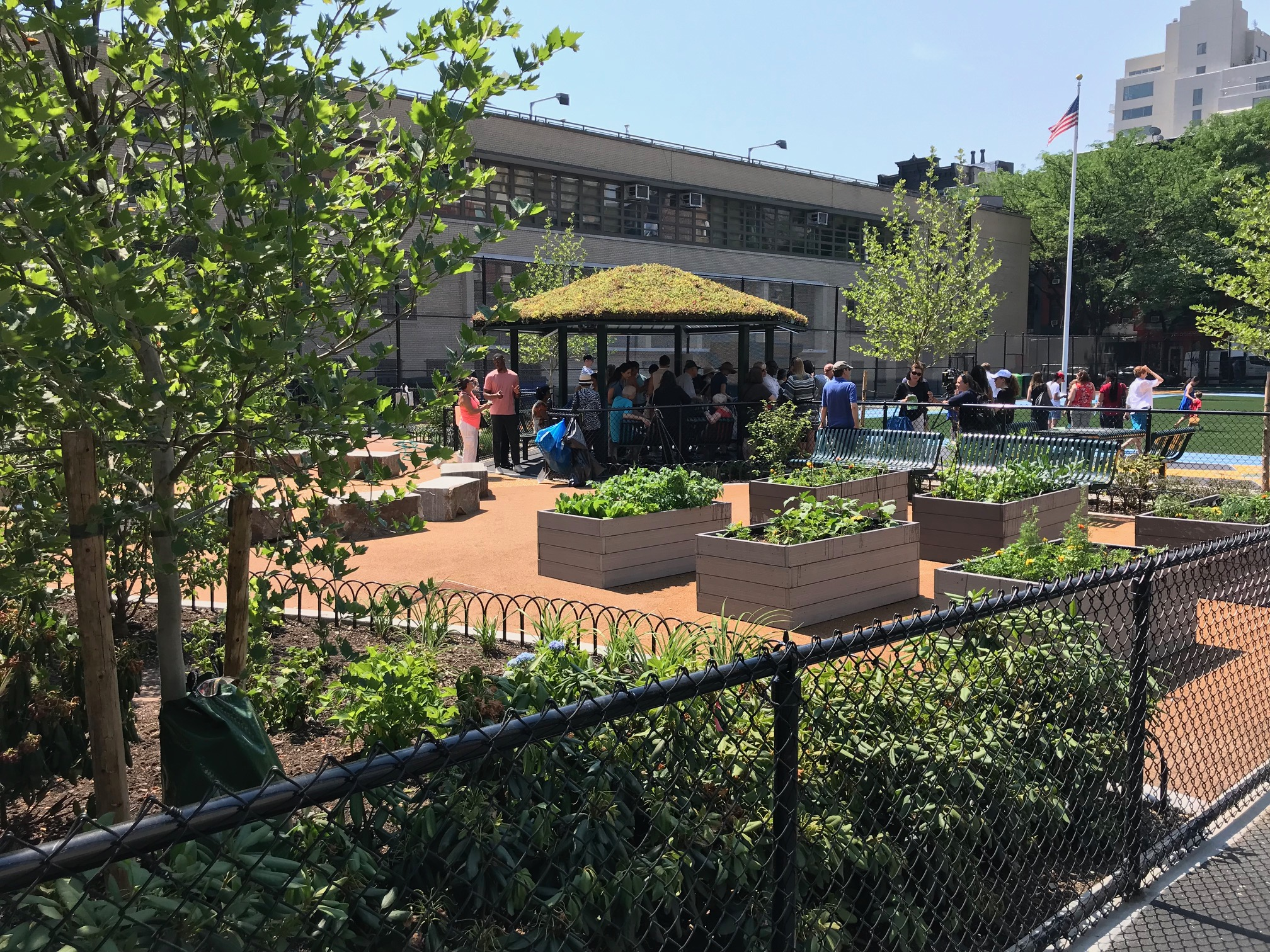
A green schoolyard at PS 19 East Village Community School in New York City

A schoolyard or school campus is the region within the boundaries of a school used for teaching, extracurricular activities, and playing sports and games.

However, some schools do not use a wall to indicate the range of the schoolyard, in these cases the general activities of teaching and after-school activities can also be called campus life, and "schoolyard" or "campus" often is used as a synonym for school life.

The term also may refer to only the outdoor portion of a campus, distinguished from classroom space. In this context, the schoolyard may be used as a teaching space to instruct students about ecological systems. In recent years there has been a growing movement around the world to create "green" schoolyards that incorporate learning gardens, storm water capture elements, and other natural features that promote environmental literacy.

== See also ==
- Cafeteria
- Students' union
