= Caroline Sanderson =

British non-fiction author and books journalist

Caroline Sanderson is a British non-fiction author and books journalist.

Since 2000 she has written non-fiction previews for The Bookseller, where she is associate editor. She has published books about Adele, Jane Austen and children's games, and a children's book about Greece. She hosts the Authors' Matters podcast for the Authors' Licensing and Collecting Society.

In 2015-2017 she held a Royal Literary Fund fellowship at the University of Worcester. In 2022 she was chair of the judges for the Baillie Gifford Prize.

Sanderson has a BA in French language and literature from the Durham University, St John's College.

== Selected publications ==
- Sanderson, Caroline (2014). Pocket Giants: Jane Austen. The History Press. ISBN 978-0752493190.
- Sanderson, Caroline (2012). Someone Like Adele. Omnibus. ISBN 978-1780383088.
- Sanderson, Caroline (2008). Kiss Chase & Conkers: The games we played. Chambers Harrap. ISBN 978-0550104274.
- Sanderson, Caroline (2006). A Rambling Fancy: In the Footsteps of Jane Austen. Cadogan. ISBN 978-1860113284.
- Sanderson, Caroline (2005). Pick Your Brains About Greece. Cadogan. ISBN 978-1860112201.
