= Johann Christoph Friedrich GutsMuths =

German gymnast

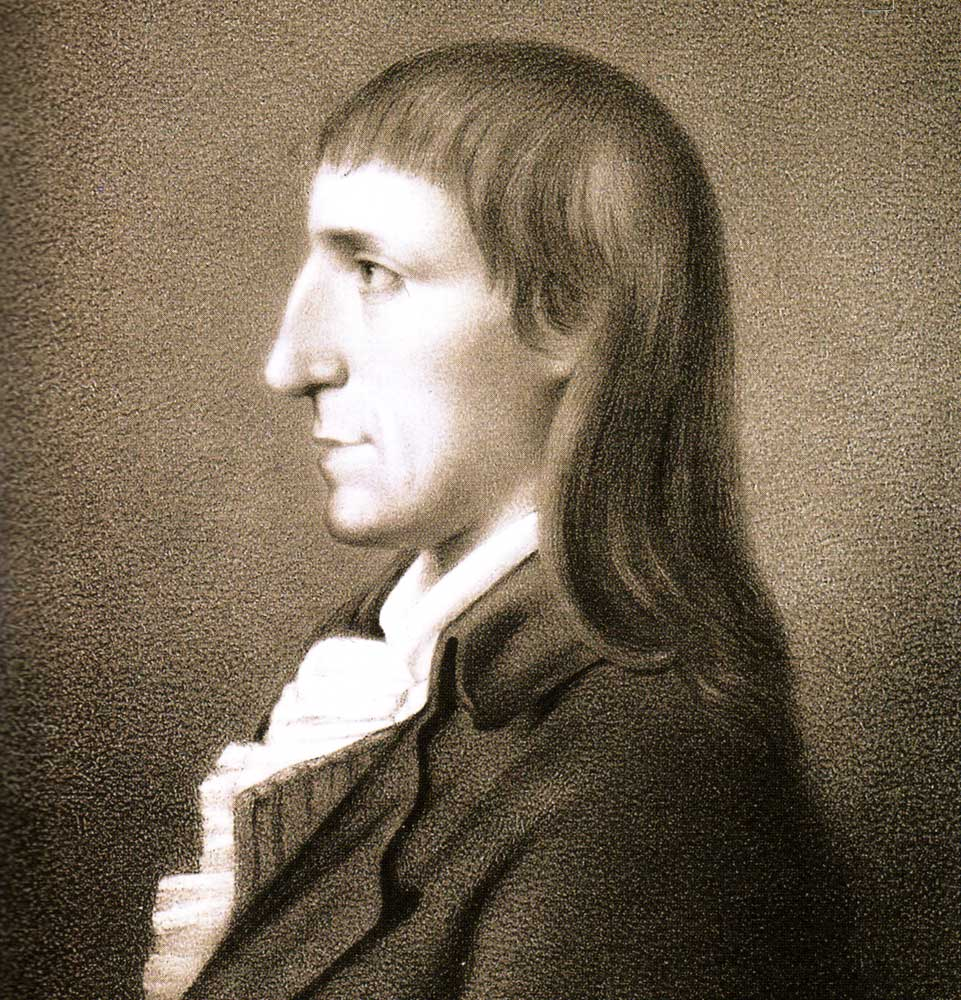
Johann Christoph Friedrich GutsMuths

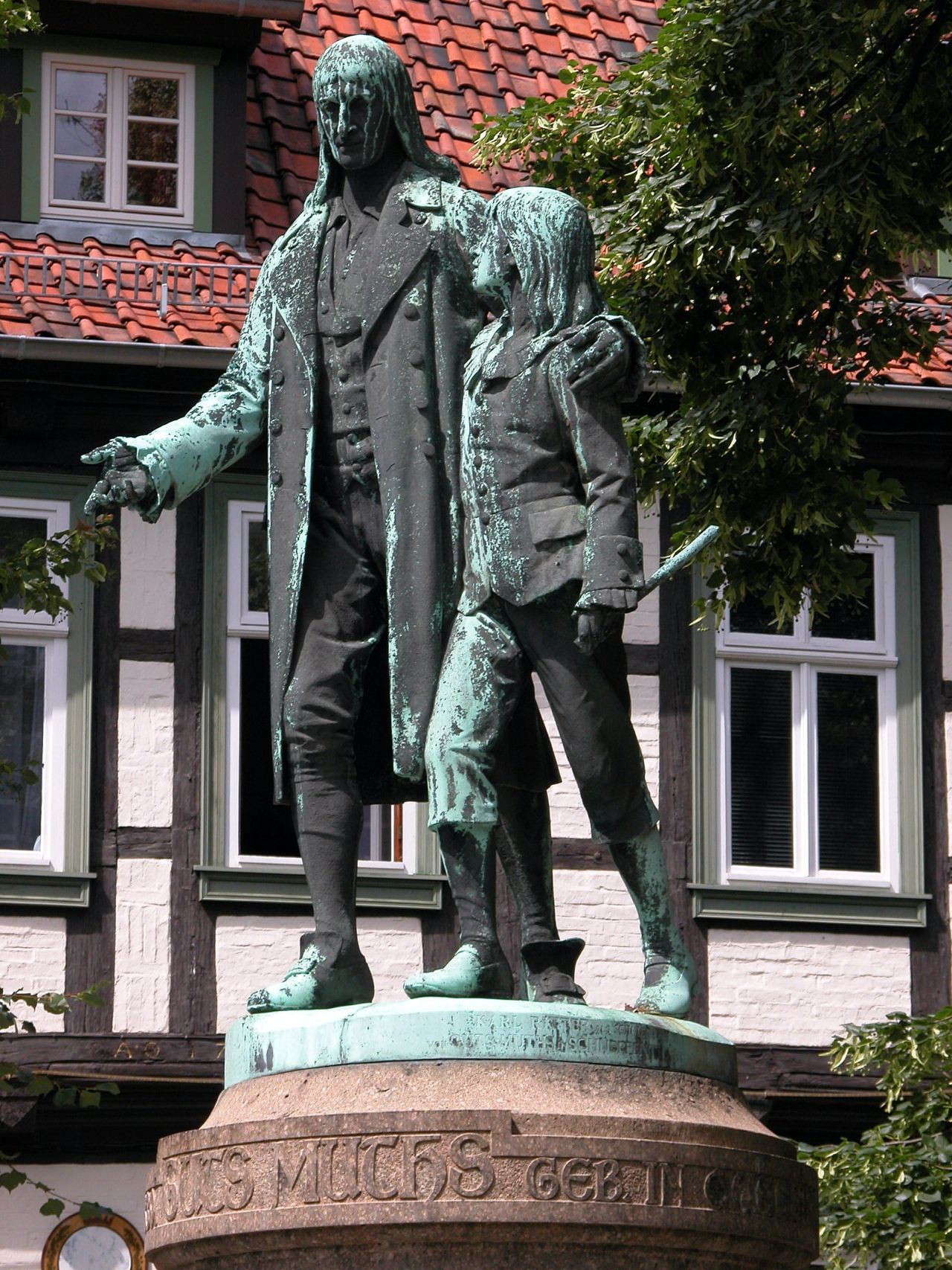
GutsMuths statue in Quedlinburg

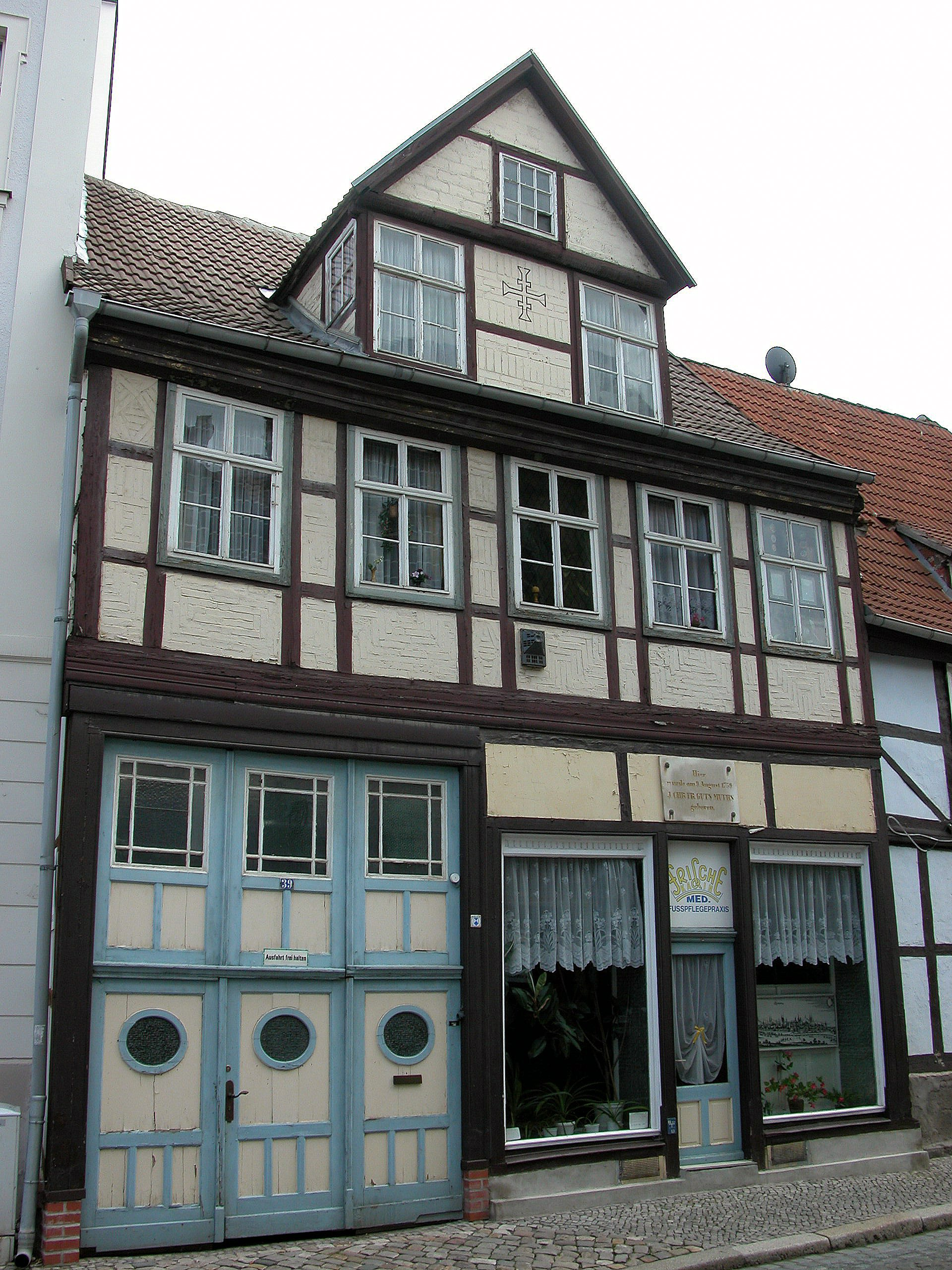
House of birth

Johann Christoph Friedrich GutsMuths, also called Guts Muth or Gutsmuths (9 August 1759 – 21 May 1839), was a teacher and educator in Germany, and is especially known for his role in the development of physical education. He is thought of as the "grandfather of gymnastics" – the "father" being Friedrich Ludwig Jahn. GutsMuths introduced systematic physical exercise into the school curriculum, and he developed the basic principles of artistic gymnastics. GutsMuths is also considered by many to be the father of modern pole vaulting, as he described the jumping standards, the distance of the approach, recommendations on hand grip, and the principles of pole jumping.

== Biography ==
He was born in Quedlinburg. He attended the University of Halle from 1778 to 1782, where he studied pedagogy. Sometime after 1785 while a private tutor in Schnepfenthal (where he remained his entire life) he was appointed as a teacher, and it was there he taught gymnastics supervised by Salzmann. In 1793, GutsMuths published Gymnastik für die Jugend, the first systematic coursebook on gymnastics.

His literary output on both moral and physical education continued upwards of twenty-five years after the production of his seminal work Gymnastik.

== Gymnastik für die Jugend ==
The full title of the manual is Gymnastics for Youth: Or a practical guide to Delightful and Amusing exercises for the Use of Schools, An Essay Toward the Necessary Improvement of Education Chiefly as It Relates to Body. Wolff is acknowledged as being an influence on the writing, and especially the intellectual movement called naturalism, embodied in the work of the philosopher Jean-Jacques Rousseau and using the prior gymnastics of ancient Greece. GutsMuths used the exercises known to his students in composing those within the work, his students were taken from European countries, and his work relied on a foundation of thought originating in the European tradition. Gutsmuths is thought to have in some way imitated Johann Bernhadt Basedow and his Philanthropinum. Ultimately Gutsmuths' work was most influential in the formalizing of a novel way of understanding physical exercise.

He describes twenty-nine different exercises in his manual. GutsMuths designed the core of the curriculum as the Greek pentathlon and new exercises he himself had invented. His work also included climbing, dancing, jumping, military exercises, running, swimming, throwing, and walking. The second, longer volume contained additional information on balancing, bathing, carrying, declamation, fasting, leaping exercises, lifting, manual labour, organising an open air gymnasium, pulling and wrestling.

Gutsmuths described gymnastics as culture for the body, which is integral to an holistic education with the aim of building a foundation of strength of character and achieving self-control. The first principle of an education in gymnastics for him was that it might:

... fully develop the aptitudes of the physical individual and attain the body's potential beauty and perfect usefulness.

A chapter of the book (Ball mit Freystäten (oder das Englische Base-ball) (English: Ball with Free Station, or English Base-ball)) contains a description of a precursor to modern baseball, including the first description of what would evolve into the strikeout rule.

== English language editions of Gymnastik für die Jugend ==
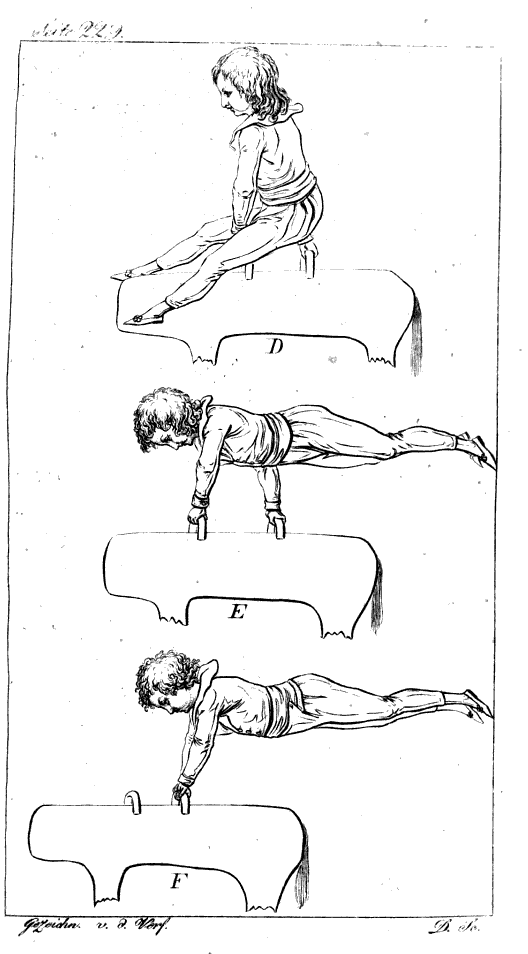
Gymnastic for the Youth

An edition was published in London in 1800, printed by J.Johnston, and in the United States of America, within the state of Philadelphia, printed by William Duane in 1802.

A second edition of Gymnastic for the Youth was published in 1804.

P.H. Clias, a Captain in the English army and Superintendent of gymnastics in the Royal Military College (after 1822), was a follower of the teachings of GutsMuths. He subsequently wrote his own work on gymnastics, which was in its fourth edition in 1825.

GutsMuths died on 21 May 1839 in Waltershausen.
