= Johann Peter Petri =

Robber and accomplice of "Schinderhannes"

Johann Peter Petri, nicknamed Old Black Peter (German: Der alte Schwarzpeter) or simply Black Peter (Schwarzer Peter), (born 24 March 1752 in Burgen near Bernkastel; died after 1812) was a robber and accomplice of Schinderhannes, the notorious highwayman. The name of the card game, Black Peter may be derived from Petri or from another notorious bandit, Peter Nikoll, also known as Black Peter.

== Life ==
His parents were Johann Peter Petri and Christina Margaretha. Around 1780, Black Peter married Maria Katharina Neumann, the daughter of an innkeeper and charcoal burner, Johann Georg Neumann (c. 1723-1803). Maria was born in 1759 in Schmelz (today a district of Neuhütten, about 15 km from Hüttgeswasen) and lived from 1765 in the hamlet of Hüttgeswasen. It is no longer possible to determine where the marriage was contracted.

With permission of Christian IV, Count Palatine of Zweibrücken, Petri built a hut in Hüttgeswasen, next to his father-in-law's dwelling, in which he lived with his family for eleven years. At that time he worked as lumberjack and charcoal burner. The charcoal produced in Hüttgeswasen was needed for iron and copper smelting by the numerous smeltworks in the district (Amt) of Allenbach.

In 1781, his first son, Johann Peter Conrad, ("Young Black Peter") was born in Hüttgeswasen. The other children, Elisabeth Margaret (born 1784), John Christian (born 1787), Abraham (1788-1791), Catharine Elisabeth (1791-1792) and John Andrew (born 1792) were also born in Hüttgeswasen. The remaining three of altogether nine children were not from Hüttgeswasen: John George (born 1794/1795), Louise (born 1797/1798) and Leonard (born about 1803/1804).

Old Black Peter's hut was burned down in 1792 during the French invasion. From this time he led an unsettled life with his family. The Petris left Hüttgeswasen and lived until 1811 in many places in the Hunsrück and on the right bank of the Rhine, especially in the area of the Odenwald. The father continued to work as a woodcutter, first for about six months for the villages of Beulich and Gondershausen, then for about a year in Schauren near Kempfeld, where he worked for someone in Hottenbach. After a six-month stay in Weiden near Hottenbach, he worked as a woodcutter at the glassworks in Soonwald for almost four years. After that he moved to Münchwald for six months and then again for a short time to the area on the right bank of the Nahe.

Petri committed numerous criminal acts such as thefts, burglaries and robberies. Together with Schinderhannes he stole two horses in August 1798 in Ellern. On 12 August 1798, he and Schinderhannes murdered Jewish cattle dealer, Simon Seligmann, in the forest near the Thiergarten forester's house. Three years earlier, the victim had observed the married Black Peter during a tryst with the wife of Polecat James (Iltis-Jakob) in the forest and had told her husband, who then killed his unfaithful wife in a quarrel.

Petri was of medium stature and had a smooth and supposedly handsome face, coal-black hair and a dark side whiskers. Contemporaries described him, on the one hand, as a true predator, but on the other as a man who was moved to tears by the sight of a boy, probably because he thought of his children.

During interrogations, Petri only incriminated thieves who had previously incriminated him and asked that this be noted in the minutes. He firmly believed that it would be advantageous to ask for a merciful punishment after confessing to each crime and was pleased when other crooks failed to do so.

Petri was also very vain. He often mentioned at a more mature age that he had been a very handsome man. When he talked about other members of his family, he always mentioned whether he was a handsome man or not. When he once received tight fitting legwear, he showed them to everyone with obvious pleasure. He liked to recount the love relationships from his younger days.

On occasions he showed a pious disposition. But he also thought he was beginning to doubt whether there was a God because he had prayed so much and his situation had not improved. When he spoke of deceased relatives or acquaintances, he always added the words "the blessed".

Old Black Peter was often arrested and interrogated. At the beginning of year VII of the French Revolutionary Calendar, he was arrested in the Canton of Obermoschel and taken to Kaiserslautern and then Simmern. On the 29th Brumaire of year VII he broke out of the tower of Simmern and fled to the east of the Rhine into the Odenwald. In the spring of 1802 he stayed in the Soonwald, but escaped the authorities and, unlike his son, Young Black Peter, did not stand trial in Mainz together with Schinderhannes. In the Odenwald he was once again active as a highwayman, burglar and thief.

After the robbery of a stagecoach between Heppenheim and Weinheim on 1 May 1811, in which Swiss merchant, Hans Jacob Rieter, was beaten to death, the then 59-year-old Black Peter was arrested in a general raid. Although he had been living in the Odenwald as a charcoal burner under the name Johannes Wild for a long time and had nothing to do with the robbery, his true identity came to light in the course of the investigations through statements made by fellow prisoners. The former accomplice of Schinderhannes, who himself was executed in Mainz in 1803, was extradited to the French authorities in Mainz on 11 November 1811 for his old crimes, where he was sentenced to life imprisonment together with another member of the Schinderhannes gang, Franz Delis.

Petri probably died behind bars. After his death, his body was transferred to the Anatomical Institute of the University of Heidelberg, where allegedly his skeleton was also kept for a long time. Today the skeleton of Black Peter is considered lost, while one attributed to Schinderhannes still exists in Heidelberg today.

== Family ==
Old Black Peter's children, as well as his wife Maria Katharina, who often took part in thefts, also became offenders. The son, Peter Petri, alias Young Black Peter, an accomplice of Schinderhannes, was sentenced to 15 years in chains in Mainz. Another son, Andrew Peter (nicknamed Charcoal Andrew) was sentenced to death for his involvement in the robbery of a stagecoach near Heppenheim in Mannheim, but this was commuted to life imprisonment because of his youth and inexperience. The sons John George Petri and Leonard participated in thefts. The daughter Elisabetha Margaretha was sentenced in 1812 in Mannheim to six months imprisonment for complicity in a robbery, adultery and trickery.

In 1813 the rest of the Petri family was arrested in the Simmern arrondissement for begging and vagabondage. The wife of Old Black Peter and a daughter later went into the poorhouse in Trier, where the latter fled. Nothing is known about her fate.

== Literature ==
- _ (1811). Allgemeiner Anzeiger der Deutschen. Vol. 2. pp. 2099 ff. Description of Petri, his family and accomplices, wanted for various crimes.
- Peter Bayerlein: Schinderhannes-Chronik, Mainz-Kostheim 2003
- Peter Bayerlein: Schinderhannes-Ortslexikon, Mainz-Kostheim 2003
- Hans-Eugen Bühler: Beiträge zur Geschichte des Amtes Allenbach. 1. Teil. Die Bedeutung der Holzhauer- und Kohlenbrennerkolonie Hüttgeswasen zwischen 1600 und 1900, Birkenfeld 1984
- Ernst Probst: Der Schwarze Peter. Ein Räuber im Hunsrück und Odenwald, Mainz-Kostheim 2005
