= Black Peter (card game) =

European children's card game

- Popular European children's game
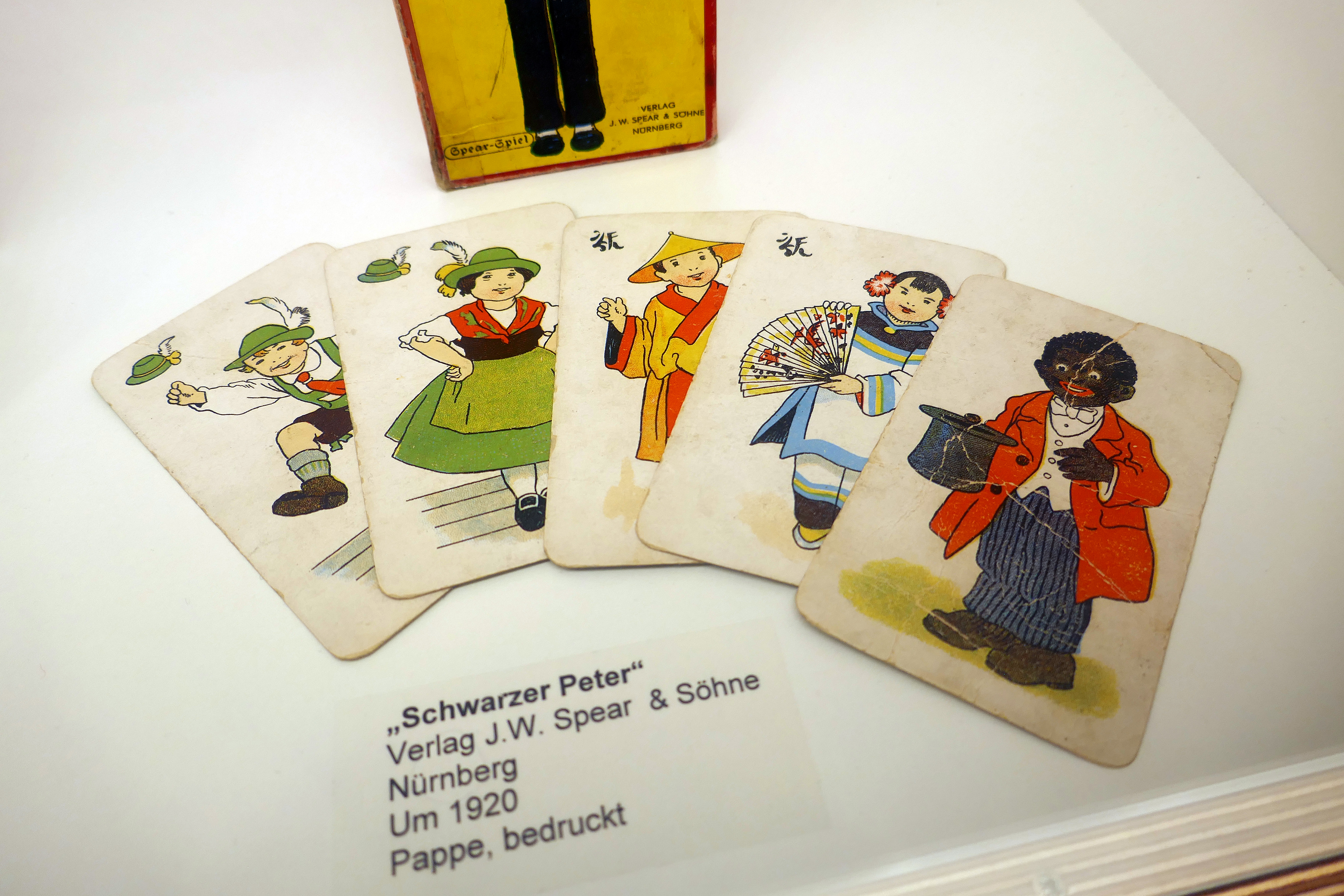
- Black Peter cards from a 1920 J. W. Spear & Sons pack
- Origin: Germany
- Alternative name: Schwarzer Peter
- Type: Shedding
- Players: 3 or more
- Age range: 6+
- Cards: 31 or 37
- Deck: Special or standard packs
- Play: Clockwise
- Playing time: 5-10 minutes
- Chance: Easy

Related games
- Old Maid, Vieux Garçon

Black Peter is the English name of the European game of Schwarzer Peter which originated in Germany where, along with Quartett, it is one of the most common children's card games. Old Maid is similar in concept to Black Peter and may derive from it.

== Name ==
The name Black Peter may be derived from the robber Johann Peter Petri, a contemporary and accomplice of Johannes Bückler, the notorious German highwayman known as Schinderhannes. Petri also went under the nickname of "Old Black Peter" (der alte Schwarzpeter) or just "Black Peter" (Schwarzer Peter) and is supposed to have invented the game while in prison, sometime after 1811.

Other sources name the game after another notorious bandit, Peter Nikoll (1771–1817), from Mecklenburg in north Germany who was also nicknamed Black Peter. However, the game may be older and simply have been renamed.

The game was certainly known by 1821 when it is briefly described in a play by von Voss in which the player left holding the Black Peter lost.

The game is known as zwartepieten ("playing Black Pete"), pijkezotjagen ("Chasing the jack of spades") or simply as Zwarte Piet in the Netherlands and as Asinello ("little donkey") in Italy. In Sweden the game is called Svarte Petter, in Finland Musta Pekka, in Denmark Sorteper, in Croatia Crni Petar, or Krampus, and in Greek as "mu(n)tzuris" (μου(ν)τζούρης, "smudged, smutted"). in Poland Piotruś ("Peter"), in Iceland Svarti Pétur ("Black Peter"), in Czech Republic Černý Petr and in Slovenia Črni Peter.

== Origin ==
The origin of Black Peter is unclear, although legend has it that it was invented in jail by the notorious criminal, Black Peter, in 1811. Its rules are recorded as early as 1821 in Das Neue Königliche L'Hombre, some years before those of the English game of Old Maid or Old Bachelor whose earliest rules appeared in 1835, and the French game of Vieux Garçon ("Old Boy"), first recorded in 1853. It is probably much older and once a simple gambling game in which the aim was to determine a loser who had to pay for the next round of drinks (cf. drinking game). An article in an 1862 issue of Deutsches Magazin says that Black Peter was originally a subgame of the student drinking game of Quodlibet which, however, is not attested before 1845.

The game employs a pack of 32 French cards, Black Peter being, in the earliest rules, the Jack of Spades, the other black Jack having been removed. (Note: In the similar French game of Vieux Garçon it is also the Jack of Spades that is the "Old Boy", while the Queen of Hearts is removed in the English equivalent leaving the Queen of Diamonds as "Old Maid".) The player who is last in and left holding Black Peter is the loser and may originally have had to pay for the next round.

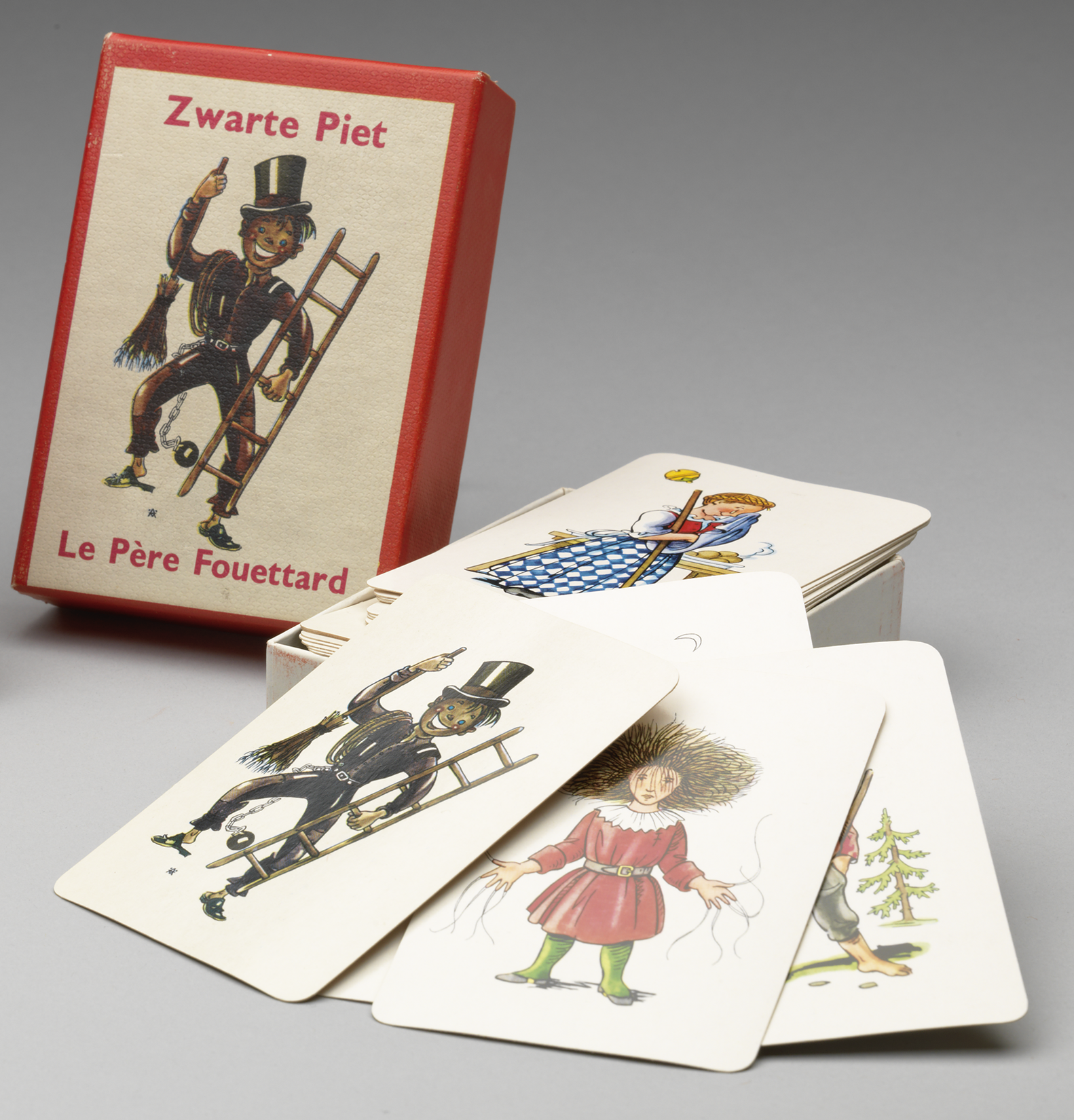
1953 Dutch pack depicting Black Peter as a chimney sweep

Black Peter has long been a popular children's game and numerous proprietary packs have been produced aimed at the children's market. The earliest known of such bespoke cards appeared around 1840 in a trilingual format. Over the course of the years the images changed, reflecting the culture and social norms of the period. In older packs, the Black Peter was sometimes a blackface caricature of a black man; other packs use a variety of different images such as chimney sweeps, black crows, black cats, black sheep, boys with ink or dirt on their hands, witches and robbers dressed in black.

== Rules ==
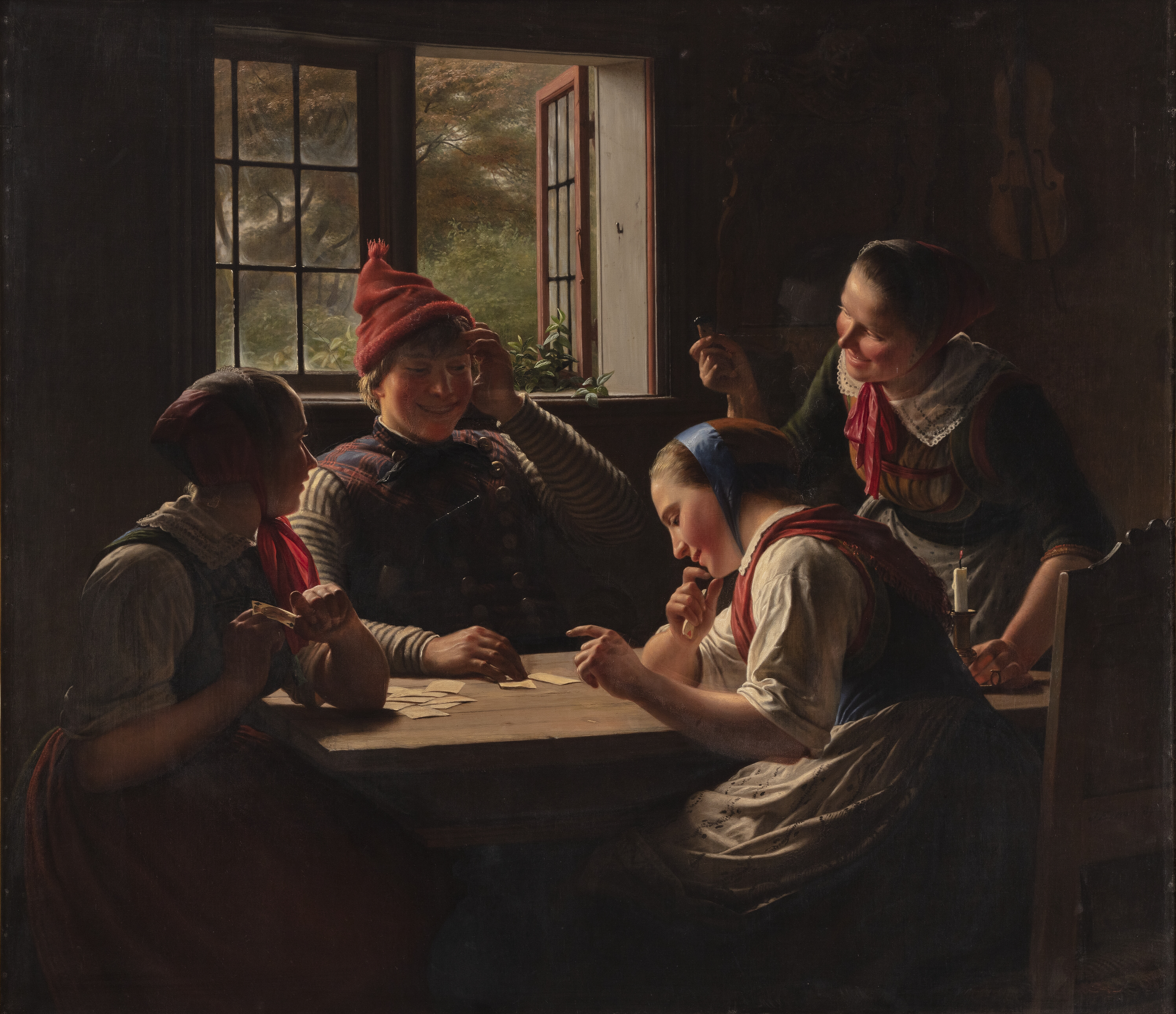
Sorteperspillerne ("Black Peter players") by Julius Exner, 1862, in the Danish National Art Gallery.

Special Black Peter packs usually consist of 31 or 37 cards: the 'Black Peter' and 15 or 18 pairs of cards. Instead of proprietary playing cards, a pack of traditional French cards may be used with a Joker as the Black Peter, or one card removed to make a particular pair incomplete.

Any number of players can participate in the game, but at least two. The cards are shuffled and fully dealt out to the players. If players find pairs in their hands, they must discard those cards immediately.

Now the card drawing begins: the youngest child, or the child holding the most cards, or the player to the left of the dealer, draws a card from the player to the left and adds it to the hand. If that player can form a pair with this new card, it must be discarded. Then it is the turn of the player on the left to play in the same way. In this way, the game continues until all pairs are discarded and one player is left with Black Peter as the only card. This player is Black Peter and receives the agreed penalty, such as a black dot on the forehead, nose or cheek.

== Saying ==
The German saying "jemandem den Schwarzen Peter zuschieben" ("to pass the Black Peter to someone") means to pass the buck, to blame or to dump something inconvenient such as an unwelcome problem or responsibility on another person.

== Schinderhansl ==
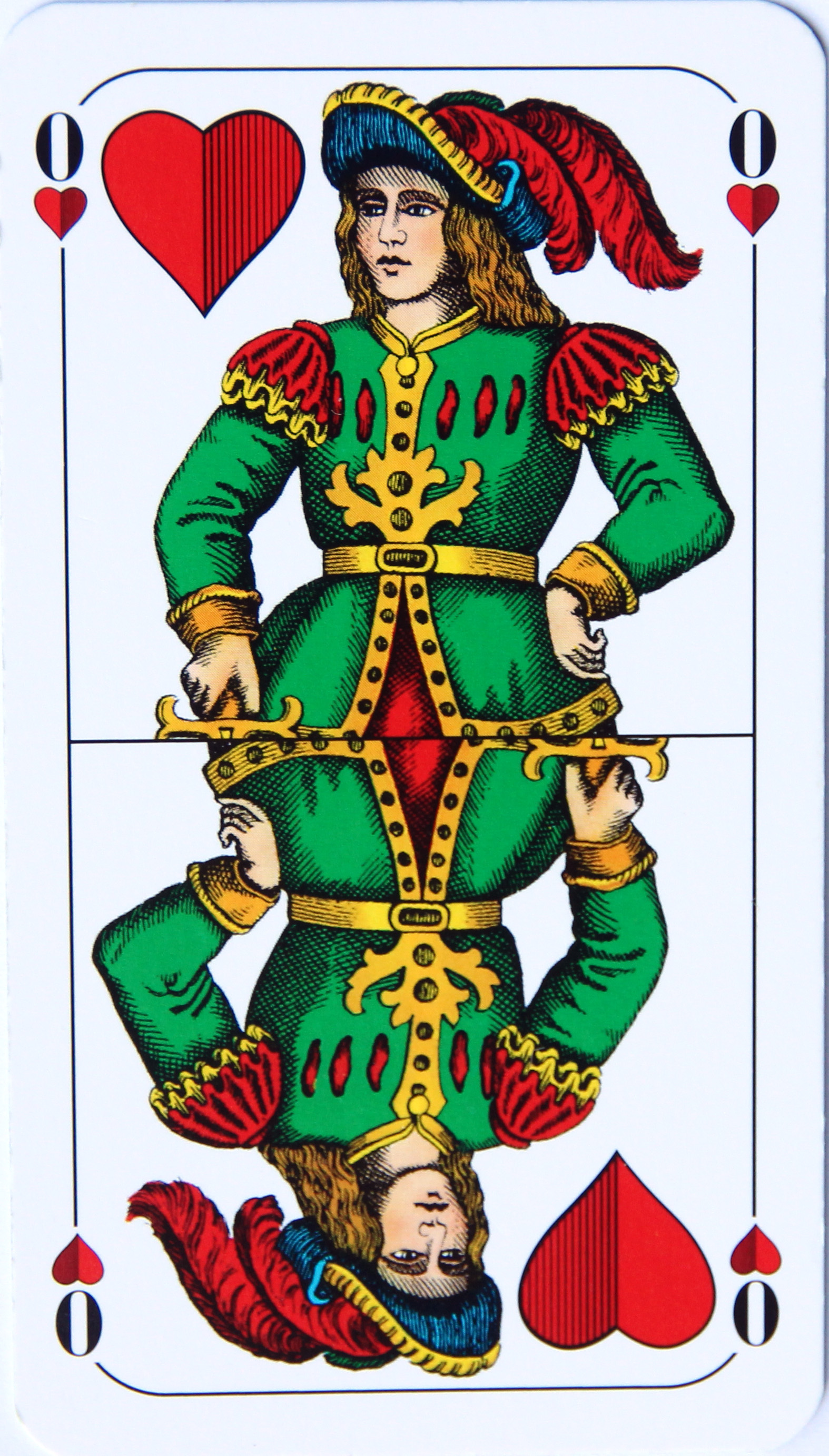
Schinderhansl

A Bavarian version of the game is played with a traditional Bavarian pattern pack of 32 cards. One of the Obers is removed – not the Ober of Hearts (illustrated) – and, after shuffling, each player receives 4 cards, the rest are stacked face down in the middle of the table. The dealer draws a card, unseen, from the player to the right. If the dealer now has a pair (e.g. two 7s or two Kings) they are laid away and two more cards drawn from the stock to replace them. The turn passes to the player to the dealer's left who draws a card from the dealer. This continues clockwise with players drawing a card, laying down any pairs and refreshing their hands to bring them back to 4 cards. If it becomes clear that no-one has any pairs, the next player draws an extra card from stock to get the game going again. The player left holding the Ober of Hearts, the Schinderhansl, loses. The game is named after the notorious German highwayman, Schinderhannes.

== Literature ==
_ (1862). Deutsches Magazin, 2, 1.1862. pp. 299–301.

- Das neue königliche l'hombre (in German). Lüneburg: Herold and Wahlstab. 1821.
- Bazaar Exchange and Mart. Vol. 29. 1883.
- Green, Charles M., ed. (1884). The Friend of All. New York: S. W. Green.
- Lasserre (1853). Nouveau manuel complet des jeux de calcul et de hasard: ou Nouvelle académie des jeux (in French). Paris: Roret.
- Leslie, Eliza (1835). The Girl's Book of Diversions. London, Dublin, Glasgow, Sydney: Tegg.
- Ernst Probst (2005), Der Schwarze Peter. Ein Räuber im Hunsrück und Odenwald (in German), Mainz-Kostheim: Probst, ISBN 978-3-936326-39-0
- Sirch, Walter (2008). Vom Alten zum Zwanzger – Bayerische Kartenspiele for Kinder and Erwachsene – neu entdeckt. Traunstein: Bayerischer Trachtenverband.
- von Voss, Julius (1821). Theaterpossen nach dem Leben.. Berlin: Petri.
- Der schwarze Peter. Ein Räuber im Hunsrück und Odenwald. CD-ROM for PC and Mac, Probst 2005, ISBN 978-3-936326-40-6.
