= The Forgiven (2021 film) =

2021 film by John Michael McDonagh

- Official release poster
- Directed by: John Michael McDonagh
- Screenplay by: John Michael McDonagh
- Based on: The Forgiven by Lawrence Osborne
- Produced by: Elizabeth Eves; John Michael McDonagh; Trevor Matthews; Nick Gordon
- Starring: Ralph Fiennes; Jessica Chastain; Matt Smith; Ismael Kanater; Caleb Landry Jones; Abbey Lee; Mourad Zaoui; Marie-Josée Croze; Alex Jennings; Saïd Taghmaoui; Christopher Abbott
- Cinematography: Larry Smith
- Edited by: Elizabeth Eves; Chris Gill
- Music by: Lorne Balfe
- Production companies: House of Un-American Activities; Brookstreet Pictures
- Distributed by: Roadside Attractions Vertical Entertainment (United States and Canada); Universal Pictures Focus Features (International)
- Release dates: 11 September 2021 (TIFF); 1 July 2022 (United States); 5 September 2022 (United Kingdom)
- Running time: 117 minutes
- Countries: United Kingdom; United States
- Languages: English; French; Arabic; Tamazight
- Box office: $1.4 million

The Forgiven is a 2021 crime drama film written and directed by John Michael McDonagh and based on the 2012 novel by Lawrence Osborne. The film stars Ralph Fiennes, Jessica Chastain, Matt Smith, Ismael Kanater, Caleb Landry Jones, Abbey Lee, Mourad Zaoui, Marie-Josée Croze, Alex Jennings, Saïd Taghmaoui, and Christopher Abbott. Elizabeth Eves and McDonagh produced the film under their House of Un-American Activities label.

The Forgiven had its world premiere at the Toronto International Film Festival on 11 September 2021, was released in the United States on 1 July 2022, by Roadside Attractions and Vertical Entertainment, and was released in the United Kingdom on 2 September 2022, by Universal Pictures and Focus Features. It received generally mixed reviews from critics.

== Plot ==
Married couple David and Jo Henninger travel to Morocco in an effort to ease the strain that has been building between them. While traveling up a curve, David accidentally hits and kills a young teenager holding a fossil.

After bringing the body of the deceased teenager, identified as Driss, to their friend Richard Galloway's house during a celebration, David agrees to report the death as accidental since he was driving intoxicated. The next day, David travels with Driss's father and interpreter Anouar back to Driss' home where he is buried.

Meanwhile, Jo stays behind and engages in debaucheries and activities hosted by Richard. She even has an affair with one of the guests. While traveling back with Anouar, David confesses that he hid Driss' identification despite Jo's protests and admits the accident was his fault.

That night, after reuniting with Jo, both she and David leave the party once most of the guests leave. Traveling past the site of Driss's death, they are confronted by his friend who is armed with a revolver. Pressured by a distressed David, the friend shoots David dead, much to Jo's horror, before walking off into the distance.

== Cast ==
- Ralph Fiennes as David Henninger
- Jessica Chastain as Jo Henninger
- Matt Smith as Richard Galloway
- Ismael Kanater as Abdellah Taheri
- Caleb Landry Jones as Dally Margolis
- Saïd Taghmaoui as Anouar
- Christopher Abbott as Tom Day
- Abbey Lee as Cody
- Mourad Zaoui as Hamid
- Marie-Josée Croze as Isabelle Péret
- Alex Jennings as Lord Swanthorne
- Fiona O’Shaughnessy as Maisy Joyce
- Briana Belle as Maribel

== Production ==
The film was announced in May 2018, to be written and directed by John Michael McDonagh, with Ralph Fiennes, Rebecca Hall, Mark Strong and Saïd Taghmaoui set to star. Filming was intended to begin in early 2019 in Morocco. Caleb Landry Jones was cast in January 2019. In December, Jessica Chastain entered negotiations to join the cast, with filming now set to begin in early 2020. Marie-Josée Croze later joined the cast of the film. In October 2020, it was reported that Matt Smith, Christopher Abbott, Ismael Kanater, Alex Jennings, and Abbey Lee had joined the cast of the film, with Focus Features distributing worldwide excluding North America.

Principal photography began in February 2020. In March 2020, production on the film was halted due to the COVID-19 pandemic. In September 2020, the shoot resumed in Morocco after a six-month pause and completed production.

== Release ==
The Forgiven had its world premiere at the 2021 Toronto International Film Festival on 11 September 2021. In November 2021, it was announced that Roadside Attractions and Vertical Entertainment acquired North American theatrical and video distribution rights to the film respectively, with Focus Features and Universal Pictures distributing in the rest of the world and Film4 retaining UK television rights. It was released in the United States on 1 July 2022, and was released in the United Kingdom on 2 September 2022.

The film was released for VOD platforms on July 19, 2022, followed by a Blu-ray and DVD release on September 13, 2022.

== Reception ==
=== Box office ===
In the United States and Canada, the film earned $135,476 from 125 theaters in its opening weekend.

=== Critical response ===
On Rotten Tomatoes, The Forgiven has an overall approval rating of 68% with an average score of 6.2/10 based on 130 reviews, with the site's consensus being, "The Forgiven often strays from an incisive critique of reckless privilege into a shallow display of bad behavior, although Ralph Fiennes' rakish performance packs plenty of sardonic bite." On Metacritic, which uses a weighted average, the film has a score of 59 based on 33 reviews indicating "mixed or average reviews".

Peter Debruge from Variety said the film was “undeniably wicked yet deliciously prickly... McDonagh loves his monsters.” John Defore from Hollywood Reporter praised the film as "scripted, directed and acted with intelligence and panache.” Pete Hammond from Deadline also praised the film as “a rare and thoroughly adult drama offering much to think about.” Steve Pond of The Wrap concluded: "There's a lot of despicable stuff going on in this efficiently nasty drama from the Irish writer-director of The Guard and Calvary, but in the hands of McDonagh, Ralph Fiennes and Jessica Chastain, you may actually find yourself caring for these people more than they care for themselves." Pete Howell from The Toronto Star wrote: "A crack ensemble cast — including Matt Smith, Caleb Landry Jones and Canada's Marie-Josée Croze — and a wickedly smart screenplay amplify moral issues that gnaw at the mind." Chris Bumbray from Joblo.com gave the film a 9 and predicted: "The Forgiven will likely open John Michael McDonagh up to a larger audience than he's got so far, thanks to the dynamic star turns by Ralph Fiennes and Jessica Chastain. Thematically, it's right in line with some of his other, under-seen gems, such as The Guard, Calvary, and most recently, War on Everyone."
