= Saïd Taghmaoui =

French actor (born 1973)

- سعيد التغماوي
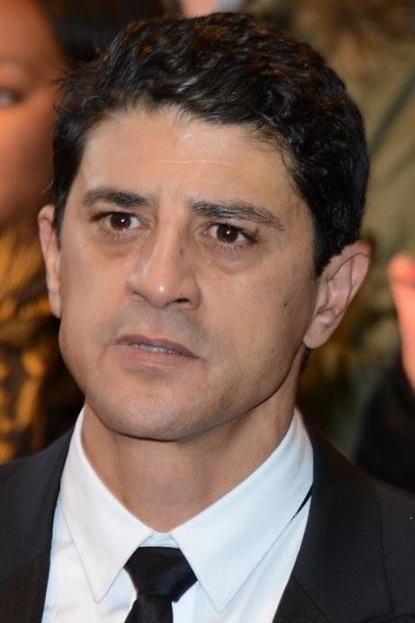
- Taghmaoui in Paris at the French premiere of American Hustle in 2014
- Born: 19 July 1973 (age 52); Villepinte, Seine-Saint-Denis, France
- Citizenship: France; United States; Morocco
- Occupation: Actor
- Years active: 1994–present

Saïd Taghmaoui (Arabic: سعيد التغماوي; born 19 July 1973) is a French actor. One of his major screen roles was that of Saïd in the 1995 French film La Haine, directed by Mathieu Kassovitz. Taghmaoui has also appeared in a number of English-language films, with roles such as Captain Said in Three Kings (1999), Breaker in G.I. Joe: The Rise of Cobra (2009), Sameer in Wonder Woman (2017), and The Elder in John Wick: Chapter 3 - Parabellum (2019).

== Early life ==
Saïd Taghmaoui was born in Villepinte, Seine-Saint-Denis, into a large family comprising eight children; he had four brothers and three sisters. His parents were Moroccan immigrants of Berber ancestry from Essaouira. Taghmaoui grew up in the Rose des Vents quartier of the Aulnay-sous-Bois commune. He dropped out of school to become a boxer, rising as high as No. 2 in his weight class in France.

== Career ==
=== France ===
He later met actor and director Mathieu Kassovitz; together, they appeared in Kassovitz's film La Haine (1995), whose plot concerns race and violence in the ghettoized banlieues of Paris. The following year, Taghmaoui was nominated for a César Award (in the Most Promising Actor category) for his performance.

=== Morocco ===
Taghmaoui acted in several Moroccan films, most notably playing Dib, the leader of a street boy gang in the movie Ali Zaoua: The Prince of the Streets (2000).

=== United States ===
He has since pursued an international career, appearing in films in Germany, Italy, Morocco and the United States (Three Kings, 1999). Taghmaoui starred in Vantage Point (2008) as Suarez, the leader of a terrorist group plotting to kidnap the United States President. In Morocco, he appeared in Djinns (2010), a film about the Algerian War, alongside Thierry Fremont. Taghmaoui's television work includes Lost, House of Saddam and Touch. He appeared in the British film My Brother the Devil, which was released globally in 2013.

== Personal life ==
Taghmaoui is a practising Muslim. He moved to the United States in 1999, and in 2008, obtained American citizenship.

== Filmography ==
Year	Title	Role	Director	Notes
1994	Putain de porte		Jean-Claude Flamand & Delphine Quentin	Short
1994	Tous les garçons et les filles de leur âge...	Paul	Olivier Dahan	TV series (1 episode)
1995	La Haine	Saïd	Mathieu Kassovitz	Nominated - César Award for Most Promising Actor
1995	J'aime beaucoup ce que vous faites		Xavier Giannoli	Short
1995	C'est mon histoire		Dominique Tabuteau	TV series (1 episode)
1995	L'éducateur	'Momo'	Dominique Tabuteau (2)	TV series (1 episode)
1996	La bougeotte		Jean-Claude Morin	TV movie
1996	Elvis Aziz	Elvis Aziz	Frédéric Compain	TV movie
1997	Go for Gold !	Moussa	Lucian Segura	
1997	Héroïnes	J.P.	Gérard Krawczyk	
1997	Les fantômes du samedi soir		Olivier Dahan (2)	Short
1997	L'albero dei destini sospesi	Samir	Rachid Benhadj	TV movie
1998	Onorevoli detenuti	Omar	Giancarlo Planta	
1998	The Garden of Eden	Aziz	Alessandro D'Alatri	
1998	Hideous Kinky	Bilal	Gillies MacKinnon	
1998	Lascars	Voice	Laurent Nicolas	TV series (1 episode)
1999	Prima del tramonto	Alì Ben Sellam	Stefano Incerti	
1999	Three Kings	Captain Said	David O. Russell	
1999	Urlaub im Orient	Raschid	Michael Wenning	TV movie
2000	La taule	The Innocent	Alain Robak	
2000	Nationale 7	Rabah	Jean-Pierre Sinapi	
2000	Ali Zaoua	Dib	Nabil Ayouch	
2000	Room to Rent	Ali	Khalid Al-Haggar	
2001	Gamer	Tony	Patrick Levy	
2001	Confession d'un dragueur	Fabio	Alain Soral	
2001	Absolument fabuleux	Manu	Gabriel Aghion	
2001	Le petit poucet	The Chief	Olivier Dahan (3)	
2002	Vivante	D.J.	Sandrine Ray	
2002	The Good Thief	Paulo	Neil Jordan	
2002	Entre chiens et loups	Werner	Alexandre Arcady	
2003	Crime Spree	Sami	Brad Mirman	
2003	The West Wing	Ambassador Umar Usef	Christopher Misiano	TV series (1 episode)
2004	Spartan	Tariq Asani	David Mamet	
2004	Hidalgo	Prince Bin Al Reeh	Joe Johnston	
2004	I Heart Huckabees	The Translator	David O. Russell (2)	Central Ohio Film Critics Association - Best Ensemble
2005	El khoubz el hafi		Rachid Benhadj (2)	
2006	Five Fingers	Dark Eyes	Laurence Malkin	
2006	O Jerusalem	Saïd Chahine	Élie Chouraqui	
2006	Djihad !	Youssef	Felix Olivier	TV movie
2006	Sleeper Cell	Hamid	Charles S. Dutton, Nick Gomez & Leslie Libman	TV series (3 episodes)
2007	The Kite Runner	Farid	Marc Forster	
2007	Suspectes	Stanislas Lamérat	Laurent Dussaux	TV miniseries
2008	Vantage Point	Suarez	Pete Travis	
2008	Traitor	Omar	Jeffrey Nachmanoff	Nominated - Black Reel Award for Best Breakthrough Performance
2008	Kandisha	Dakir Nesri	Jerome Cohen-Olivar	
2008	Mogadischu	Kapitän Mahmud	Roland Suso Richter	TV movie
2008	House of Saddam	Barzan Ibrahim	Alex Holmes	TV miniseries
2008	Duval et Moretti	Tarek	Dominique Guillo	TV series (1 episode)
2009	G.I. Joe: The Rise of Cobra	Abel Shaz / Breaker	Stephen Sommers	
2009	Linear	Biker	Anton Corbijn	
2009	Lost	Caesar	Stephen Williams & Jack Bender	TV series (4 episodes)
2010	Djinns	Aroui	Hugues & Sandra Martin	
2010	The Killers		Abazar Khayami	Short
2011	Conan the Barbarian	Ela-Shan	Marcus Nispel	
2012	My Brother the Devil	Sayyid	Sally El Hosaini	
2012	Strike Back	Othmani	Paul Wilmshurst	TV series (2 episodes)
2013	American Hustle	Irv's Sheik Plant	David O. Russell (3)	
2013	Touch	Guillermo Ortiz	Various	TV series (10 episodes)
2014	The Missing	Khalid Ziane	Tom Shankland	TV series (8 episodes)
2015	For All Eyes Always	Iskandar Yasin	Rob Gordon Bralver	
2015	La nuit est faite pour dormir	Hassan	Adrien Costello	Short
2016	The Infiltrator	Amjad Awan	Brad Furman	
2017	Wonder Woman	Sameer	Patty Jenkins	
2018	At First Light	Cal	Jason Stone	
2019	John Wick: Chapter 3 – Parabellum	The Elder	Chad Stahelski	
2020	Embattled	Claude Yaurek	Nick Sarkisov	
2021	The Forgiven	Anouar	John Michael McDonagh	
2023	The Family Plan	Augie	Simon Cellan Jones	
2024	The Killer	Prince Majeb Bin Abdul Faheem	John Woo	
2025	Tin Soldier	Atlas	Brad Furman	

== See also ==
- Maghrebian community of Paris
