= Racism in France =

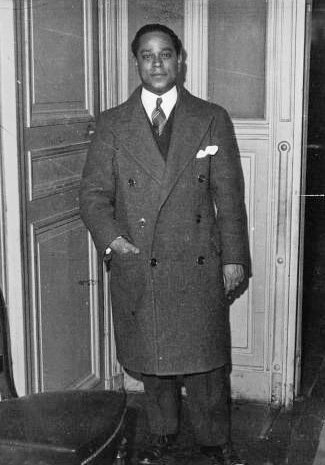
Gaston Monnerville (1897–1991) was the first black person to hold the office of President of the Senate (1947–1968), the second-highest political office in France.

Racism has been called a serious social issue in French society, despite a widespread public belief that racism does not exist on a serious scale in France. Antisemitism and prejudice against Muslims have a long history. Acts of racism have been reported against members of various minority groups, including Jews, Roma, Berbers, Arabs, Southeast Asians and East Asians. Police data from 2019 indicated a total of 1,142 acts classified as "racist" without a religious connotation.

In-depth assessing of the issue remains difficult as French law prohibits the government from collecting ethnic and religious census data (French: statistiques ethniques et religieuses). The National and Consultative Commission on Human Rights (Commission nationale et consultative des droits de l'Homme) reported in 2016 that only 8% of French people believe that some races are superior to others. French law legislates against racism. The Constitution of 1958 guarantees citizens equal treatment despite origin, race or religion. France was relatively early in history to have black people in a national parliament (1793, 1848 then 1891 and all years after) or in a government (1887, 1931, 1932–1933, 1937–1938), or as president of a house of parliament (1947–1968 in the Senate). Some black people have held decisive positions, such as military officer Camille Mortenol who commanded the antiaircraft defence of Paris against Germany in 1914–1918. It nurtured the idea of a national immunity against racism despite the growth of anti-Arab violent crimes in the 1960s–1970s following waves of Arabic immigration.

France has long been a secular state (French: État laïc). The 1905 French law on the Separation of the Churches and the State established state secularism. The 2004 French law on secularity and conspicuous religious symbols in schools bans all conspicuous religious signs for students in schools; the 1905 law prohibits all non-neutral signs (political and religious) on the part of all people working for the state, most notably in the civil service, including teachers and all other staff in a school. Politicians are prohibited from expressing religious preferences in public including through religious clothing. French secular laws have been presented by minority groups, especially Muslims in recent years, hindering their ability to express their religion. In December 2022, the UN Committee on the Elimination of Racial Discrimination (Cerd) said it was "concerned" by "the persistence and extent of racist and discriminatory discourse in France, particularly in the media and on the Internet". At the end of the periodic review of France's policy towards its minorities, the independent experts of Cerd issued a series of observations and recommendations. They are concerned about the "racist political discourse held by political leaders", whose names are not mentioned, about certain minorities, in particular the Roma, travelers, Africans, or people of African descent, or North African.

== Culture and political tradition ==
French political tradition does not use the term "racial minority" in its discourse because all of the rights that the French Revolution represents lie on two notions: the notion of the state and the notion of man. Thus, French political tradition sees these rights as a universal and natural (or inalienable) benefit of being human.

Some believe that politicians' desire to adhere to these ideals leads to a lack of recognition of ethnic minority groups. The existence of minority ethnicities is recognized in many European nations by the judicial system and the political sphere. Some states give migrants specific rights such as the right to receive an education in their native language. France, however, does not allow these rights as it only recognizes rights in the context of citizenship and human characterization.

In this vein, the state has encouraged assimilationist policies. In particular, the government has sought that foreign-born nationals, who have acquired French nationality, be considered French and not by their ethnic self-identity. Many Arab Muslims in France identify as Muslim, rather than Algerian, Moroccan or Arab. This is based more on community and family ties than religious observance. It is said that the notion of ethnicity (ethnicité), when it is used in France, ignores reference to race, in contrast to perceived usage the term in North America and the United Kingdom, to focus on cultural aspects.

== Governmental and police statistics ==
The Interior Ministry provides a set of descriptors to be used by the police to classify individuals in lieu of race. The descriptors are: européen (nordique, caucasien, méditerranéen); africain/antillais; métis; maghrébin; moyen-oriental; asiatique; indo-pakistanais; latino-américain; polynésien; mélanésien-canaque.

For each year since 1990, the National Commission on Human Rights (French: Commission nationale et consultative des droits de l'Homme), attached to the Office of the Prime Minister, publishes a report regarding the state of racism in France.

In 2016, the Commission reported that 33% of French people believe human races do not validly exist, while 8% believe that some races are superior to others. It is believed that the 2015 terrorist attacks in France led to a greater presence of Islamophobia and raised the number of racist acts. Complaints of anti-Muslim acts and threats increased by 223% and the incidence of violent racist attacks was higher in the month following each terrorist attack.

According to the Commission, this data does not show the full reality as it is based exclusively on police data amidst a backdrop of allegations that French police are unjust in their treatment of racial issues.

The Commission also reported that 34% of the French population view Islam in a negative light and 50% consider it a menace against the national identity. In addition, 41% of the population believe that Jews have a singular relationship with money and 20% of them believe that Jews have too much power in France.

The Romani people in France are the minority group less tolerated: 74% of French people consider them a groupe à part ("apart group") and more than half of the people still believe the Roma make their living from stealing and other illicit activities.

In March 2024, the statistical service of the French Ministry of the Interior reports that crimes or offenses of a racist, xenophobic, antisemitic or anti-religious nature increased by 32% in 2023 compared to 2022 in France.

According to the 2024 report of the National Consultative Commission on Human Rights, the report notes a very great intolerance towards minorities and a sharp increase in racist acts in France.

== Racism and religion ==
Some racist acts have a religious connotation: 687 anti-Jewish and 154 anti-Muslim acts were perpetrated in 2019 for a total population of over 67 million. Although France's Muslim population far exceeds its Jewish population according to private studies, antisemitic acts far outnumbered Islamophobic acts in 2019 according to official government statistics.

Religious minorities have experienced discrimination based on France's secularism laws. Recently, in 2022, the Council of State ruled in favour of the Ministry of the Interior that the municipality of Grenoble had broken secular national law when its council voted in favour of authorizing burkinis in public swimming pools. In a 2016 case however, the Council of State ruled that burkinis could be worn on public beaches in France as beaches were found to constitute a "public space" rather than a "public service".

== Racism against Jews ==
In France, Liberty of religion was mainly granted by two laws: the first law was passed in 1789 and the second in 1905.

=== The Dreyfus Affair ===
In 1894, a Jewish artillery officer, Alfred Dreyfus, was accused of giving secret French documents to the German army and tried and convicted of treason. In 1895, the real culprit, Commander Esterhazy was found, tried, and acquitted, even though abundant proof of his guilt was brought to court. Dreyfus and his family then decided to contact the President of the Senate to prove the weakness of the allegations that were brought against him. Because antisemitic and nationalist ideals plagued late 19th-century France, Dreyfus was quickly targeted due to his Jewish origins and he fell victim to much antisemitic discrimination. Eleven years after his conviction, Dreyfus was found innocent.

=== The Vichy Regime of 1940–1944 ===
In 1939, France declared war on Nazi Germany after the German invasion of Poland. Many tensions arose within the government, separating supporters of the war effort from dissidents. Marshal Pétain became Council President after Paul Reynaud stepped down and left office due to the harsh climate that the French government was experiencing. Pétain left Paris and traveled to Vichy (a free zone) with his government. With the support of Pierre Laval, he obtained full powers from the National Assembly and used them to create a new constitution for the French state, putting an end to the 3rd Republic.

The new Pétain government, also called the Vichy Government, surrendered to Nazi Germany on 22 June 1940, in Rethondes, France. Germany immediately moved into France and the Gestapo occupied the Northern part of the country. After becoming head of State, Pétain set up a cult of personality, banned all political parties and censored the press. After it instituted these reforms, the Vichy government began to express its antisemitic views by passing laws which discriminated against Jews in imitation of the Nazi German Nuremberg laws. In 1940, Jews were prohibited from working in certain jobs and they were also prohibited from going to certain places such as restaurants and stores. They were also required to wear the Star of David on their shirts, the visibility of this symbol enabled non-Jews to recognize Jews on sight. As the Vichy government continued to collaborate with Nazi Germany and as Jews continued to be marginalized from French society, French officials organized raids and they also began to call for the deportation of all Jews who were living within French territory.

==== The Vélodrome d'Hiver ====
In July 1942, 13,152 Jews (mostly women and children) were deported to the Auschwitz concentration camp during the Vélodrome d'Hiver raids. Arrested Jews were transported by bus to the Vélodrome d'hiver (or Vel' d'hiv'). Singles or couples without children were sent to the Drancy internment camp and from there, deported to Auschwitz, where most of them were killed. Families were sent to the Beaune-la-Rolande internment camp or Pithiviers internment camp, where they were forcibly separated and then deported to Auschwitz. For the first time, women and children were raided and deported. These raids focused on foreign Jews which meant that most of these children were of French nationality since they had been born in France. No children came back from Auschwitz and fewer than ten women survived.

==== Apology by France ====
On 16 July 1995, in a site near the Vel d'Hiv, French president Jacques Chirac, made an important speech in which he pronounced his recognition of France's responsibility for the persecution of Jews during the Second World War, an action that had been long-awaited by the French-Jewish community.

== Racism against Sub-Saharan Africans ==
=== The African slave trade ===
In 1315, King Louis X stated that "French ground frees any slave that touches it". Although the Portuguese had been involved in slavery since 1441, in 1594 the first French slave expedition occurred and in the middle of the 17th century the Caribbean island colonies of Martinique, Guadeloupe, Dominica, Grenada, Saint-Domingue (Haiti), Saint-Martin and Saint Barthélemy were occupied by French powers. The deportation of slaves to French colonies was legalized in 1626 and the trade of slaves was made legal by Louis XIII in 1642, transatlantic expeditions had only been transporting goods and "engagés" (European workers who paid for their travel by working for 36 months in tobacco plantations upon their arrival in the New World). However, the year 1674 portrayed a shift in France's position in the trade of African slaves.

In 1674, due to oversupply, the price of tobacco was dragged down. This encouraged colonists to turn to the cultivation of sugar. Although the sale of sugar cane was a lot more profitable than the sale of tobacco, its cultivation was also a lot more difficult and intensive than that of tobacco. African slaves thus replaced "engagès" as their servile labor was necessary for the economic development of France. In 1673, the Senegal Company was founded. It was responsible for the provision of slaves to the island of Saint-Domingue. Up until then, commerce had mostly been between the West Indies and France, but now France had entered in the Triangular Trade, which meant that commerce was now between France, Africa and the West Indies. Although France's participation in the trade was delayed, it ended up playing an important role in the overall trade of African slaves. In total, 17 French ports participated in the slave trade with over 3,300 slave expeditions. The port of Nantes was France's principal slave port as it was responsible for about 42% of France's slave trade. Other important ports were those of La Rochelle, Marseille, Honfleur, Lorient, Le Havre, Bordeaux and Saint-Malo.

In 1685, Louis XIV set up the Code Noir ("Black Code"), a set of rules written by Jean-Baptiste Colbert. These rules were based on the principle that the black slave had no judicial rights and was the property of his master. Below are some examples of articles present in the Black Code:

- Article 44: the black slave is declared "movable" which means that he is a good that can be sold or passed down from generation to generation.
- Article 46: the black slave can be sold at an auction.
- Article 28: the black slave is prohibited from owning anything.
- Articles 30 and 31: the black slave has no right to go to court, even if he is a victim, and his testimony holds no value whatsoever. However, if a slave hits his master (article 33), acts inappropriately towards a free person (article 34) or steals a horse or cow (article 35), he is to be killed.
- Article 38: the runaway slave is to have his ears cut and is to have the image of a lily "fleur-de-lis" (a symbol of French royalty) branded unto his shoulder. If he relapses, he is to have the shallow of his knee cut and is to have a lily branded on his other shoulder. After a third offense, he is to be killed.

In 18th-century France, the funding for African slave ships came from 500 wealthy families, with about 20 of them funding about a quarter of the 2,800 ships headed towards Africa. This slave-owning aristocracy occupied a very prominent part in port-based societies on both an economic and political level. During this period, French commerce flourished due to the development of the slave trade in its colonies. It is estimated that between 1676 and 1800, France deported one million slaves to the West Indies. Between 1815 and 1830, nearly all of Nantes mayors had been slave owners and traders.

During the period of Enlightenment in France, however, slavery and the trade of slaves were more and more criticized by philosophers of the Enlightenment. For instance, Montesquieu, in The Spirit of the Laws (1748) criticized those who called themselves Christians yet practiced slavery. Also, Voltaire, in Candide (1759), denounced the difficult conditions faced by African slaves. In 1788, Société des Amis Noirs ("Society of the Friends of the Blacks") was founded to abolish the slave trade using the argument that slavery was not economically profitable.

Slavery was first abolished in continental France before the French islands.

=== Napoleon Reestablishing Slavery ===
In 1789, the Declaration of the Rights of Man and of the Citizen of the French Republic abolished slavery. However, it was not until 1794 thanks to the Society of the Friends of the Blacks' efforts, that slavery was abolished in the colonies. In 1802, Napoleon, encouraged by wife Josephine who originated from and owned many assets in Martinique, reestablished slavery, the slave trade, and the Black Code. This was the only time in history that slavery was re-established after it had been abolished. This sparked a rebellion. Napoleon sent military expeditions in Saint-Domingue and Guadeloupe to contain the rebellion and reestablish slavery. The black freedom fighters of Saint-Domingue ended up being victorious over Napoleon's troops and proclaimed their independence after what is commonly known as the Haitian Revolution. In January 1803, this first black republic was founded and took the name of Haiti.

In 1815, after the Napoleon's Hundred Days, Napoleon was alleged to aligned himself with Congress and decreed the abolition of slavery. However, Napoleon never abolished slavery, which continued up to the 1840s on Gorée Island, Senegal. In 1848, King Louis-Phillippe abdicated and the provisional government of the Republic was founded, proclaiming that "No French territory can hold slaves". Finally, on 27 April 1848, the provisional Government abolished slavery in all French colonies. The government abolished slavery on 23 May for Martinique, 27 May for Guadeloupe, 10 August for French Guiana, and 20 December for Reunion. Illegal slave commerce persisted for a short time after but was quickly transformed into a commerce of Chinese or Indian "engagés" workers.

On 10 May 2001, the French Senate adopted a law that recognized the trade of slaves and Napoleon's reestablishing slavery in French territory as a crime against humanity. In 2006, 10 May was held to be a national date of commemoration of the abolition of slavery.

== Racism against Algerians ==
The Algerian presence in France, both Berbers and Arabs, resulted from a unique history that began over a century ago. Algerians have been migrating from the colonies to the metropolis since the second half of the 19th century. Not recognized as French or foreign, Algerians have gone from being Indigenous people to French subjects, to "French Muslims of Algeria". The Algerian migration to the French metropolis did not coincide with the colonial conquest of the Algerian territory in 1830. At that time, Algeria was a colony that attracted hundreds of thousands of Europeans coming from France, Spain, Italy, and Malta. French presence in Algeria gravely hurt the indigenous populations of Algeria, impoverished rural communities, and reduced resources within Algerian land. These events, along with large increases in population caused the great migration from colonial Algeria to the French metropolis at the end of the 19th century.

Principally Kabyles (a Berber sub-ethnic group), young men provided labor in the development of French cities and of agricultural exploitations in the Mediterranean littorals of the metropolis (mainly Marseille). Migrant workers from Algeria composed a community in the metropolis. These workers created a network that facilitated their access to work, news from Algeria, and the preservation of both cultural and religious traditions in France. It was difficult to measure the size of this community as Algerians were not distinguished from the French but simply called "workers originating from Algeria". In 1912, a census estimated that 4,000 to 5,000 Algerians lived in France and about 1,000 of them lived in the capital. They had become a crucial part of France's agricultural, industrial, and urban sectors as they offered good and cheap labor. The First World War later increased the migration to France. Close to 100,000 workers from Algeria and over 175,000 colonial soldiers were recruited by the French army between 1914 and 1918. However, after the end of the war, public powers sent many of these workers and soldiers back to their colonies.

Algerians had French nationality, so they were not called foreigners; however, they did not enjoy the same rights as French citizens: the human common right was applicable to French citizens, while the Muslim Maliki right was applicable to Muslim people, as the Muslim right is "revealed" (by God) and cannot be improved by one human: Muslim judges applied Muslim rights to Muslim people, although the latter were in a French jurisdiction.

This difference did not apply to Algerians who had the right to establish in (metropolitan) France: those Algerians had the same rights as French citizens, and Algerian law has never been applicable in France.

Migratory fluxes from Algeria to the metropolis began to be regulated. Algerian migrants had to present work contracts, proof of savings, health certificates, and identity cards with pictures. Most of these migrants were young men looking for work. Many Algerian authorities, entrepreneurs, and colonists began to fear the draining of the Algerian labor force in the colony and began to criticize this strong migratory current. In France, public powers searched to assist and protect its "Muslim subjects" by inaugurating the Great Mosque of Paris in 1926, constructing the French Muslim hospital in 1935, and constructing the Muslim cemetery in 1937. These initiatives were thought to be masking certain desires to control and keep a close eye on the immigrant community. In 1925, the Service of North African Indigenous Affairs (SAINA) was created to satisfy these objectives. The SAINA led to the development of nationalist and anti-colonial ideals within the Algerian community. In June 1926, Messali Hadj founded the North African Star in Paris. These militants criticized the colonial system and called for the independence of Algeria and all other Maghreb countries (Morocco and Tunisia). The Popular Front put an end to the North African Star in January 1937. The Star reappeared on 11 May under the name of the Party of the Algerian People which was later prohibited in September 1939.

Algerians fought alongside the French during the Second World War, fighting Nazi powers and helping in the liberation of France. After the end of the war, Algerians sought to obtain their independence from France during the Algerian War. During the eight years of war, the number of Algerians in the metropolis went from 211,000 in 1954 to 350,000 in 1962. However, the violence faced by the "Muslim population" only got worse. The French army sectioned off prohibited zones in which it regrouped the Algerian migrants and put them under military surveillance. The army regrouped about 2 million Algerians. Furthermore, Algerian migrants worked the harshest, most difficult, and less remunerative jobs. Finally, on 17 October 1961, during a protest organized by the Front of National Liberation, 11,538 people were arrested and many, possibly 100 were killed. Nevertheless, Algerians continued to migrate to the metropolis, staying for longer periods and bringing their entire families along. There were 7,000 Algerian families in 1954 and 30,000 by 1962.

On 5 July 1962, Algerians obtained their independence. Independent Algeria continued to see more and more of its young population migrate to France. The experience of Algerians in France was during the late 1970s and 1980s however characterized by racism and extreme violence. Recurrent issues during these decades were 'racial killings by police. In response, many protests and initiatives were in these decades organized in especially Paris, Marseille, and Lyon, including Zaâma d'Banlieue in Lyon's suburbs and Rock Against Police in the Parisian suburbs.

== Racism against other North Africans (Arabs and Berbers) ==
In March 1990, according to a poll reported in Le Monde, 76% of those polled said that there were too many Arabs in France while 39% said they had an "aversion" to Arabs. In the following years, Interior Minister Charles Pasqua was noted for dramatically toughening immigration laws.

In May 2005, riots broke out between North Africans (Arabs and Berbers) and Romani in Perpignan, after a young North African man was shot dead and another North African man was lynched by a group of Romani people.

In 2010, a poll found that 28 percent of French people thought that North Africans were "more likely to commit crimes than members of other ethnic groups".

As of 2013, expressions such as "sale arabe" or "sale race" are considered as racist. This expression was also used against Camélia Jordana.

In 2016, Maghrebis were slightly more accepted than Muslims.

== Racism against Chinese people ==
In June 2013, six Chinese students were attacked in a racist incident in Bordeaux. One of the students had a bottle thrown at her face, causing injuries that required surgery. The incident prompted the Chinese government to demand protection for their citizens.

== Racism against Roma ==
In July 2013, a nighttime attack on a Roma camp in Seine-Saint-Denis took place.

In 2010, the United Nations accused France of racism against Roma as it began deportations, declaring: "The United Nations finds the recent French government hardline stance worrisome." Activists alleged that France's treatment of Roma was "simply inhuman". It was condemned as "abusive and racist," saying "the Roma have too often been Europe's scapegoats." In 2019, about 44% of French people had unfavorable views on Roma.

== Racism against White people ==
Claims of racism against whites have been brought forward by various far-right parties, and other groups beginning in the 1980s, including from the right and left. In September 2012, Jean-François Copé, the leader of the Union for a Popular Movement (UMP), and then incumbent for his reelection, denounced the development of an anti-white prejudice by people living in France, some of them French citizens, against the "Gauls", a name among immigrants for the native French, according to him, on the basis of these having a different religion, colour skin, and ethnic background. The former Minister of the Interior, Claude Guéant, went on record stating that this kind of racism is a reality in France and that there is nothing worse than the political elite hiding from the truth.

When questioned on the subject of racism against whites, Prime Minister Jean-Marc Ayrault, a Socialist, acknowledged that such racism "can exist"; however, he indicated that one must be "very careful when using words of this nature", warning against "a kind of chase behind the ideas of the National Front". His government's Minister of Women's Rights, Najat Vallaud-Belkacem, echoed this view when, in her book Raison de plus! (2012), she called on everyone to recognize the reality of such racism and to condemn it like all others. In December 2023, when questioned about the Crépol attack that led to the death of Thomas Perotto, former Prime Minister Édouard Philippe considered that it is "quite possible that there is a new form of anti-white racism" in France. This opinion was shared by Minister of the Interior Gérald Darmanin, who added that "Not saying [that this racism] exists is not telling the truth." In March 2025, Government spokesperson Sophie Primas said she has "no shame" in evoking the existence of "anti-white racism." Later that month, Fabien Roussel, national secretary of the French Communist Party, declared: "Of course [anti-white racism] exists", for which he was criticized.

== Racism against non-European refugees ==
On 4 April 2022, the Euro-Med Human Rights Monitor released a report, that documented racist and inhuman practices against non-European refugees. The French authorities in the Essonne and Pantin regions issued a decision to expel non-European refugees from the shelters to be replaced by Ukrainian refugees. Also, according to other reports, the authorities told 50 refugees from Guinea, Mali, and Afghanistan that they would soon be expelled from shelters without the right of objection to make way for Ukrainian refugees.

== Consequences of racism ==
=== Claims of racism in sport ===
Before the Euro 2016 tournament, racist claims, emanating from several French public figures about the lack of players of North African origins, attracted media attention. Eric Cantona accused the French manager Didier Deschamps of racism. The latter filed a suit against Cantona over defamation. Shortly after Karim Benzema, who is regarded as a main victim considering his top form and season with Real Madrid, accused Deschamps of "bowing to racists" on the pages of Marca.

Manuel Valls, the French Prime Minister was filmed in the past claiming there were too many blacks and Roma people in the south-eastern suburbs of Paris.

=== In politics ===
In 1964, the Occident movement was founded by former members of the FEN syndicate (Fédération des Etudiants Nationalistes) which had stood against the abandonment of French Algeria. Initially directed by Pierre Sidos, Occident positioned itself as a movement perpetuating popular French extreme-right traditions of the 1920s and 1930s, which included racist themes, maurrassism and fascism. The Occident movement later became the Ordre Nouveau movement which in turn, became the National Front (1974).

The National Front was an extreme-right party that openly claimed its nationalist and conservative ideals. This party was initially led by Jean-Marie Le Pen, who was often considered to be the spokesman and face of the party. Le Pen was reprimanded many times for racist actions and the National Front was held responsible for a couple of race-based crimes. Notably, in 1995, three militants of the National Front shot at two young boys of African origins who were running to catch their bus. One of the young boys, Ali Ibrahim, a 17-year-old from the Comoros Islands, was fatally wounded. Bruno Mégret, who was second-in-command of the National Front at the time, stated that this event was due to "massive and uncontrollable immigration" in France. He added that he was thankful that his militants had been armed. In 2011, Marine Le Pen, Jean-Marie Le Pen's daughter, took over as President of the National Front. She has also expressed anti-Islam and anti-immigration views.

The claim of racism against white people has been brought forward by various far-right parties since 1978, and other groups beginning in the 1980s, including from the right. In September 2012, Jean-François Copé, the leader of the Union for a Popular Movement (UMP) and then incumbent for his reelection, denounced the development of anti-white racism by people living in France, some of them French citizens, against the "Gauls" – a name among immigrants for the native French according to him – based on these having a different religion, skin colour and ethnic background. Former Interior Minister Claude Guéant went on record stating that this kind of racism is a "reality" in France and that there is nothing worse than the political elite hiding from the truth. Marine Le Pen criticized the UMP itself as she stated it had denied the existence of such racism during its five-year reign in power (2007–2012) and suspected a tactical move to win over voters and support from the National Front. In 2010, a white couple and their 12-year-old daughter living in a mainly Maghrebi neighborhood were the victims of racist insults and death threats. They were evacuated from their home under police protection. In 2013, three men were convicted in the case.

In recent years, many newspapers, such as Libération and The Washington Post, have published articles on the increase of racist comments made by political leaders against minority groups. In 2009, Secretary of State Nadine Morano said that what she expected from the young French Muslim was that "he love his country, that he find a job, that he not speak "verlan" or slang, that he not wear his baseball cap backward". In February 2012, the Minister of the Interior at the time, Guéant, continued the targeting of Islamic populations by stating that leftist ideologies were wrong and that in fact, all civilizations did not equate each other. He stated that nations that defend liberty, equality, and fraternity (France's motto) were superior to nations that accepted tyranny, inequality for women, and social and ethnic hatred. He concluded by stating that his "civilization" must be protected.

In October 2013, a National Front municipal candidate, Anne-Sophie Leclere, compared the Minister of Justice, Christiane Taubira, a black woman, to a monkey. She affirmed that she would rather see the French Guianesen native "in a tree than in the government". About a week later, students at an anti-gay manifestation surrounded Taubira in Angers, with signs that read "monkey, eat your banana". Taubira later mentioned she believed France to be in the midst of an identity crisis.

On 29 April 2014, in The Independent, a UK newspaper, Taubira stated: "I see a country in distress. We need to reconstruct its sense of history and its capacity to live together. Can the 'public word' – our political debate – raise itself to address these big questions? I don't just mean the government. I mean all political forces, both government and opposition and all the opinion-makers in the media."

=== In legislation ===
==== Immigration laws ====
In March 1990, according to a poll reported in Le Monde, 76% of those polled said that there were too many Arabs and Berbers in France while 39% said they had an "aversion" to Arabs and Berbers. In the following years, Interior Minister Charles Pasqua was noted for dramatically toughening immigration laws.

In October 2013, UMP Leader Jean-Francois Copé sought to reform immigration laws by changing the acquisition of French citizenship by birth. Relying on the Civil Code which states that one can also become French through heritage, Copé claimed that the right of blood trumped all in the acquisition of citizenship. For Copé, the automatic acquisition of French citizenship at birth needed to be reformed as a means of achieving full assimilation of those in France, fighting for secularism and fighting against communitarianism. Guillaume Peltier, the co-founder of the La Droite ("The Right") movement, mentioned that in the same way that the right to express the desire to enter a community is a basic principle, so is the power of a national community to accept or refuse such an entry.

==== Secularisation laws ====
The "hijab ban" law, presented as the secularisation of schools and supported by all major parties in the French Parliament, as well as many feminists, was interpreted by its critics as an "indirect legitimization of anti-Muslim stereotypes, fostering rather than preventing racism".

In December 2013, the government-run by the Socialist Party displayed its fear of growing racism and divisions between ethnic groups in France. In its report, the government recommended emphasizing the "Arab-Oriental" side of French culture by "barring the media from mentioning a person's ethnicity and promoting the teaching of Arabic and African languages in schools". However, these recommendations were not well received by France's conservative opposition who claimed that such actions meant abandoning French culture and secular values. Copé called for the government to reject the report. Prime Minister Jean-Marc Ayrault responded that he did not plan to remove the ban and that these reports did not in any way represent the position of the government.

=== In media ===
Several films concerning racism within French society have been produced such as La Haine, Les Misérables (2019 film) and The Intouchables. La Haine and Les Misérables (2019) both examine the impact of systemic racism on working-class banlieusards, particularly the racism these films perceive to exist within the French police.

== See also ==
- French nationalism
- Environmental racism in Europe
- Geography of antisemitism
- Antisemitism in France
- Racism in Europe
- Racism by country
- Immigration to France
- Cagot
