= The Second Death =

- Directed by: John Michael McDonagh
- Written by: John Michael McDonagh
- Produced by: Chris Clark; Flora Fernandez-Marengo; John Michael McDonagh; Martin McDonagh
- Starring: Liam Cunningham; Michelle Fairley; Aidan Gillen; Owen Sharpe; David Wilmot; Dermot Healy; Gary Lydon; Roxanna Nic Liam
- Cinematography: Peter Thwaites
- Edited by: Jon Harris
- Music by: Paul Clark
- Production company: Reprisal Films
- Release date: 14 July 2000 (Ireland)
- Running time: 11 minutes
- Country: Ireland
- Language: English

The Second Death is a 2000 Irish short drama film written and directed by John Michael McDonagh. It stars Liam Cunningham as a middle-aged alcoholic who returns home from his local pub when he hears a voice from his past and comes to realise he is doomed.

== Cast ==
- Liam Cunningham as James Mangan
- Michelle Fairley as Aisling
- Aidan Gillen as Pool Player 1
- Owen Sharpe as Pool Player 2
- David Wilmot as Chess Player 1
- Dermot Healy as Chess Player 2
- Gary Lydon as Gerry Stanton
- Roxanna Nic Liam as Helen Rainey (credited as Roxanna Williams)

== Production ==
Cunningham, Fairley, and Gillen would all later star together in Game of Thrones. The film is McDonagh's debut as both writer and director; his younger brother Martin served as an executive producer on the film, though they have not worked together since as they admit that they would disagree and argue too much.
