= The Forgiven (novel) =

2012 novel by Lawrence Osborne

First edition

The Forgiven is a best-selling 2012 psychological thriller by Lawrence Osborne, published in the United States and the United Kingdom by Hogarth Press.

== Reception ==
Based loosely on a true story set in the deserts of Morocco, the book received widespread acclaim on both sides of the Atlantic. The Economist chose it as one of its Best Books of 2012; and Robert Collins, in The Sunday Times in London, hailed its "brooding, compelling" quality. In The New York Times, critic Dwight Garner wrote: "This is a lean book that moves like a panther. Even better, Mr Osborne has a keen and sometimes cruel eye for humans and their manners and morals, and for the natural world. You can open to almost any page and find brutally fine observations."

== Adaptations ==
In 2018, it was announced at Cannes that John Michael McDonagh would direct a film adaptation, starring Ralph Fiennes, Jessica Chastain and Matt Smith. It premiered at a Gala screening at the Toronto Film Festival in September 2021.
