= Kandisha (2008 film) =

2008 film directed by Jerome Cohen-Olivar

- Directed by: Jerome Cohen-Olivar
- Written by: Jérôme Cohen-Olivar
- Produced by: Albert-Levy; Dounia Benjelloun
- Starring: Amira Casar; Hiam Abbass; David Carradine
- Cinematography: Dominique Gentil
- Edited by: Julien Fouré
- Music by: Kenneth Lampl
- Production companies: salaman films; Dounia Production
- Release dates: December 7, 2008 (Marrakech); September 22, 2010 (Morocco)
- Running time: 97 minutes
- Country: Morocco
- Languages: Arabic; English; French

Kandisha is a 2008 Moroccan horror film directed by Jerome Cohen-Olivar, starring Amira Casar, David Carradine, Michaël Cohen, Saïd Taghmaoui, Mourad Zaoui, Hiam Abbass and Assaad Bouab.

== Plot ==
A famous jinn fights lawyer Naila Al-Jaidi, who is attempting to find out how her daughter died.

== Cast ==
- Amira Casar as Nyla Jayde
- Hiam Abbass as Mona Bendrissi
- David Carradine as The American
- Michaël Cohen as Mehdi Jayde
- Saïd Taghmaoui as Dakir Nesri
- Assaad Bouab as The Cabalist
- Amal Ayouch as Dr Maliki
- Mourad Zaoui as Jamil

== Screening ==
Kandisha was first screened at the Marrakech International Film Festival in 2008.
