= Ismael Kanater =

Moroccan actor (1956/1957–2026)

- إسماعيل القناطر
- Born: Ismaïl Abou El Kanater; 1956 or 1957; Casablanca, Morocco
- Died: 20 February 2026 (aged 69); U.S.
- Citizenship: Morocco
- Occupation: Actor

Ismaïl Abou El Kanater (Arabic: إسماعيل أبو القناطر; 1956 or 1957 – 20 February 2026) was a Moroccan actor. He participated in several Moroccan and foreign films and television series.

== Career ==
Ismail began his artistic career through training at the Conservatory in Casablanca. He studied alongside Aziz Saadallah, Khadija Asad and others, and participated as an actor in the plays (The Ghoul) and (Our Right to Land). In the early seventies, he participated, along with Conservatoire students, in founding the (Pocket Theater) troupe and undertaking a theatrical tour in Algeria. In 1973, he worked in the plays of Tayeb Saddiki such as (Maqamat Badi Al-Zaman Al-Hamdani), (Sidi Abdel-Rahman Al-Majdoub) and (Al-Sufoud), and in some television sketches by the late director Hamid Bin Al-Sharif, in addition to a dramatic work entitled (The Deserted Village), accompanied by Khadija Asad and Al-Shuaiba Al-Athrawi, Touriya Jabrane, and Zhour Maamri. He also participated with the director Abd al-Rahman al-Khayyat in the play (Dirham al-Halal) alongside Naima al-Mashriqi, Aziz Mawhoub and others, and in a television movie as a person whose role is only he and Naima al-Mashriqi and directed by the husband of the latter.

== Traveling to the United States ==
In 1977, Abou El Kanater traveled to the United States to study the art of diagnosis, in fulfillment of a deep desire in himself since childhood, in which he started watching American films in particular in the Mondial and Monte Carlo halls and others with his father, his dream was to one day become an international actor of the caliber of Marlon Brando. Indeed, he enrolled in an American university, where he studied cinema, painting, sculpture, engineering and design for four years, and obtained a degree in cinema (major) and psychology (minor), and instead of merging into the worlds of cinema, he returned to the theater there and performed the plays (Diary of a Madman) by Nikolai Gogol and (Caligula) by Albert Camus. He made successful tours. He also stood on the stage of the most famous experimental and avant-garde theaters in New York (Manhattan), and worked with the world-famous "Lamama" theater and with other groups. Under the urgency of the desire to practice cinematic and television diagnostics, Abu al-Qanater went to Hollywood in the nineties, but the road was not paved with roses, and he returned to practicing his theatrical love through the play (Shahrazad and the Four Daughters of Baghdad) that was successfully shown. As part of his research on the life of Muslims in Andalusia, in preparation of writing a theatrical text whose hero is Lady Macbeth as an Andalusian Muslim, he got acquainted with the Sufism movement in Andalusia and the elder Sheikh Ibn Arabi in particular, so he devoted himself to reading his texts and what was written about him. As a result of his influence, he decided to leave the Macbeth play project aside and devote himself to the completion of One Man Show: Ibn Arabi through which he reviewed his travel from Andalusia to Fez, Algeria, Tunisia and Asia, all the way to the home of Jalaluddin Al-Rumi. And he began to read about the latter and traveled with him in his worlds, and in the end settled his opinion on the completion of a first theatrical work on Jalal al-Din al-Rumi, a second on Ibn Arabi and a third on Macbeth. During his openness to the worlds of Sufi poles, he found that what he was doing was in fact a search for himself, through what he has lived and witnessed of things, so he became involved in the worlds of Sufism and traveled to Karachi and discovered the music of Pakistani qawwali and learned many things. He decided to perform the Hajj in the Holy Land, but a friend advised him to marry first, so he returned to Morocco and married in 2000 and had his first daughter from his oval wife in 2001 and then with a second daughter. And since he became responsible for a family of four people living under his cover in American homes in Los Angeles, it became clear to him that working in theater alone was no longer enough, and from here he decided to open up to cinema and television and transfer his long theatrical experience to them, so Abu Al-Qanater was able to enter the American art scene through many famous American series, including (24), (Sleeping Cell), (Elias), (Over There), (Babylon 5) and others, and he also participated in many international films, including the Queen of the Desert by Werner Herzog, which part was filmed by him in Morocco, and it was starring Nicole Kidman, James Franco and Robert Pattinson. In Morocco, the "Labricad" series was his first television work, which he filmed under the direction of director Adel El-Fadili, followed by many television and cinematic films.

== Death ==
Kanater died on 20 February 2026, at the age of 69.

== Filmography ==
Film

- 2021 The Forgiven
- 2017 El Hajat (The pilgrims)
- 2015 Domouaa Ebliss (Satan's Tears)
- 2015 Queen of the Desert
- 2014 Adiab lA Tanam (Wolves that never sleep)
- 2012 Dakirat Attin (Clay memory)
- 2011 Mawchouma (Femme écrite (Mawchouma))
- 2011 Anihaya (The End)
- 2010 Mahatat Al Malaika (Terminus des anges)
- 2010 Ard aljmoa (Land of the multitudes)
- 2010 Hayat Qasira (short life), a short film (16 minutes)
- 2009 Rajol Fawqa Chobohat (A man above reproach)
- 2008 Hjar El Ouad (Stones of the valley)
- 2008 Had Assadaka (Limit Of Friendship)

Television

- 2020 Al Irth (The Inheritance)
- 2016 Al Ghoul (Ghoul)
- 2015 Tut
- 2014 Tyrant
- 2013 Ras Lemhayen (The head of calamities)
- 2007 labrigad
- 2007 24
- 2006 Sleeper Cell
- 2004 Alias
- 2004 Babylon 5
- 2004 Duckman
