= Wake Up Morocco =

- Inhad ya Maghreb
- Directed by: Narjiss Nejjar
- Written by: Narjiss Nejjar
- Produced by: Noufissa Sbai, Meriem El Kissi
- Starring: Siham Assif, Hassan Skalli, Fatima Harrandi
- Cinematography: Stefano Paradiso
- Edited by: Christel Aubert
- Music by: Sophia Charai
- Production companies: Jbila Méditerranée Productions (Morocco), Terre Sud Films (France)
- Release date: December 2006
- Running time: 110 minutes
- Country: Morocco
- Language: Moroccan Arabic

Wake Up Morocco is a 2006 Moroccan film directed by Narjiss Nejjar. It was screened at the National Film Festival in Tangier and the Marrakesh International Film Festival.

== Synopsis ==
On an islet off the coast of Casablanca, an old footballer spends his days with his granddaughter Alia, dreaming of the final he could have won if he had not spent the night with a woman. Now old and living on the same islet, the woman dreams of him as well.

== Cast ==
- Hassan Skalli (old footballer)
- Fatim-Zahra Ibrahimi (Alia)
- Raouia (the fortuneteller)
- Qassem Benhayoun (Jad)
- Fatima Harrandi
- Mourad Zaoui (adult Jad)
- Mohamed Belfquih
- Siham Assif
- Hassan Guessous
- Leila Slimani
