= Mourad Zaoui =

Moroccan actor

- Born: Mourad Zaoui; 23 April 1980 (age 45); Casablanca, Morocco
- Citizenship: Morocco
- Education: Lycée Elbilia, Queens College
- Occupation: Actor
- Years active: 2004–present
- Notable work: Kandisha
- Parents: Mostapha Zaoui. (father); Khadija Zaoui. (mother)

Mourad Zaoui (Arabic: مراد زاوي; born 23 April 1980) is a Moroccan actor.

== Biography ==
Mourad Zaoui was born in the Aïn Sebaâ district of Casablanca, Morocco, on 23 April 1980. He is the oldest of two sons born to Mostapha and Khadija Zaoui.

After earning his bachelor's degree in business communication at the Lycée Elbilia in Casablanca in 1999, he moved to New York City to study English at Queens College. It was there that he discovered his passion for theatre and cinema.

In 2002, however, Mourad’s father was diagnosed with lung cancer, whereupon Mourad returned to Morocco to care for him and take over his family’s shoe manufacturing business. After his father’s death in 2004, Mourad decided to pursue his dream of becoming an actor.

In 2005, at the age of 25, Mourad was cast as the lead role in his first feature film, Wake Up Morocco. His first film role proved to be a difficult experience, as Mourad suffered from injuries from a motorcycle accident right before filming, as well as an appendicitis attack during filming. Despite these initial hurdles, Mourad persevered in his acting career, moving on to being cast in more than 60 film and television projects in Morocco and around the world.

When he is not acting, Mourd enjoys surfing, fashion, motor sports, and martial arts.

== Filmography ==
=== Film ===
- Wake Up Morocco (2006)
- Les larmes d'argent (2007)
- Française (2008)
- Kandisha (2008)
- H'rash (Short) (2009)
- You Kiss like a God / Líbáš jako Bůh (2009)
- Smile (2009)
- La grande villa (2010)
- The Liturgy Series (Video) (2010)
- The Shepherd (Short) (2011)
- Casa Riders (Short) (2011)
- The End (2011)
- Salam Ghourba (Short) (2011)
- Chaala (Short) (2012)
- Líbáš jako ďábel (2012)
- La vie des autres (2013)
- À l'aube, un 19 février (2013)
- Né quelque part (2013)
- Exit Marrakech / Morocco (2013)
- Rock the Casbah (2013)
- The Physician (2013)
- Desert Dancer (2014)
- SAGA, l'histoire des hommes qui ne reviennent jamais (2014)
- Atlantic. (2014)
- The Gospel of John (2014)
- The Gospel of Matthew (2014)
- The Gospel of Mark (2015)
- The Gospel of Luke (2015)
- Chaïbia (2015)
- Un pari Pimente (2015)
- The Foreigner (Short) (2015)
- The Green March (2016)

=== Television ===
- Les larmes d'argent (2007)
- Nuclear Secrets, Episode 5: The Terror Trader (TV miniseries) (2007)
- A Wonderful Family: Vacances marocaines (TV series) (2007)
- Vacation Getaway: Marrakech (TV movie) (2008)
- 3ichk al baroud 2010 (TV movie) (2010)
- Ramesses: Mummy King Mystery (TV movie) (2011)
- Willkommen im Krieg (TV movie) (2012)
- Mankind: The Story of All of Us, Episode 1: Inventors (TV mini-series) (2012)
- Khamsa (TV series) (2014)
- The Ark (TV film) (2015)
- Killing Jesus (TV miniseries) (2015)
- The Night Manager, Episode 6 (TV miniseries) (2016)
- The Blacklist, Episode 5 Season 5 (TV series) (2017)
