= War on Everyone =

2016 British film by John Michael McDonagh

- British poster
- Directed by: John Michael McDonagh
- Written by: John Michael McDonagh
- Produced by: Chris Clark; Flora Fernandez-Marengo; Phil Hunt; Compton Ross
- Starring: Alexander Skarsgård; Michael Peña; Tessa Thompson; Caleb Landry Jones; Theo James
- Cinematography: Bobby Bukowski
- Edited by: Chris Gill
- Music by: Lorne Balfe
- Production companies: Bankside Films; BFI; Head Gear Films; Kreo Films FZ; Metrol Technology; Reprisal Films
- Distributed by: Icon Film Distribution
- Release dates: 12 February 2016 (Berlin); 7 October 2016 (United Kingdom)
- Running time: 97 minutes
- Country: United Kingdom
- Language: English
- Box office: $698,036

War on Everyone is a 2016 British black comedy buddy cop film written and directed by John Michael McDonagh. The film stars Alexander Skarsgård, Michael Peña, and Theo James. Set and filmed in Albuquerque, New Mexico, it was screened in the Panorama section of the 66th Berlin International Film Festival. The film was released in the United Kingdom and Ireland on 7 October 2016 through Icon Film Distribution.

== Plot ==
Terry Monroe and Bob Bolaño, two corrupt cops, return to the Albuquerque police force after being suspended for assaulting a racist coworker. Bolaño and Monroe regularly assault, rob and extort criminals, accept bribes, and take drugs. While surveilling small time thieves, the two come to believe Jimmy Harris, a local criminal, is planning a heist. They contact one of Harris' former associates, Reggie, and coerce him into revealing information by threatening to falsely arrest him. Reggie and his friend, Irishman Pádraic Power, identify Clifford Reynard, a getaway driver, and tell them Harris' girlfriend, Jackie Hollis, used to dance at a strip club owned by Russell Birdwell. Birdwell, though suspicious, reveals Hollis' address. After bursting into Harris' house and knocking him out, they extort several expensive possessions.

Meanwhile, Birdwell tells his boss, James Mangan, an ennobled British businessman who is in charge of the heist, that the cops have been asking about Hollis. Mangan tells Birdwell to intimidate both Hollis and the cops. Monroe returns to Hollis and gives her a replacement television. After flirting with each other, they have sex and begin seeing each other. While staking out Reynard's house to extort him, too, they hear a scream. In the house, they find that Reynard's wife has murdered him, though she is too hysterical to explain why. Irritated, the cops attempt to quiet her while they consider their next step. Reynard's teenage son flees, but they are unable to catch him. After a nightmare, Monroe becomes concerned and searches the city for the missing boy. As he does this, Birdwell scares Bolaño's wife by smashing the window of her shop as she talks to Hollis.

With Reynard dead, Reggie takes his place as the getaway driver, though he misleads Bolaño and Monroe into believing it will be taking place elsewhere. When the cops finally catch on to him, they discover Harris and his cohorts dead. Not knowing Mangan's involvement, they assume Reggie is responsible. Before going after Reggie, they learn about Birdwell's harassment and beat him so badly that he loses an eye. Knowing they have numerous enemies and believing themselves untouchable anyway, they do not bother asking who sent him, remaining blind to Mangan's involvement. Reggie's friend Power, when offered a bribe, tells them Reggie fled to Iceland. Though they know nothing more than that, they leave for Iceland, reasoning that an African American man will stick out. To Monroe's amazement, the plan works, and they spontaneously find him in a crowd. Under pressure, Reggie reveals Mangan's involvement and agrees to split his take from the heist with them.

Back in Albuquerque, Lieutenant Stanton says Birdwell has filed charges against them. Monroe and Bolaño assure him that their investigation is nearing completion and will implicate Birdwell. As Monroe and Bolaño search for Mangan, they chance upon Reynard's child, who is living homeless on the streets. Monroe insists on becoming the boy's foster parent over the protests of Bolaño, who, as a parent, believes Monroe unprepared for the responsibility. Hollis, who has temporarily moved in with Monroe after Birdwell's attack, also voices her skepticism, but the three eventually come to care for each other. Although Mangan's thugs kidnap and beat Monroe, he laughs off their attempt to intimidate him, saying he has already been raped. Not wanting to kill a cop, they release him. However, after Monroe and Bolaño harass Mangan during a business meeting, Lieutenant Stanton finally fires them.

Mangan beheads Power and contacts the cops, hoping to entrap them with an offer of sharing the money. Reynard's son, however, tells Monroe that his mother killed Reynard because she found out he was part of a child pornography ring run by Mangan. Enraged, Monroe enlists Bolaño to help kill Mangan, having lost interest in the money. In the resulting shootout, Bolaño is apparently killed but reveals he was wearing a bulletproof vest. Monroe shoots Birdwell as he begs for his life. Bolaño then kills Mangan as he attempts to bribe them. Monroe, Hollis, Reynard's son, Bolaño and his family, Reggie and Reggie's transgender girlfriend are all shown together on holiday in Iceland at the Blue Lagoon.

== Cast ==
- Michael Peña as Bob Bolaño
- Alexander Skarsgård as Terry Monroe
- Tessa Thompson as Jackie Hollis
- Caleb Landry Jones as Russell Birdwell
- David Wilmot as Pádraic Power
- Malcolm Barrett as Reggie X
- Stephanie Sigman as Delores Bolaño
- Paul Reiser as Lt. Gerry Stanton
- Theo James as Lord James Mangan
- Derrick Barry as Kimberly

== Production ==
The film was produced by Chris Clark and Flora Fernandez-Marengo, and co-produced by Elizabeth Eves for Reprisal Films. Phil Hunt and Compton Ross also produced for Head Gear Films, with the support of the BFI Film Fund.

=== Influences ===
McDonagh said the film's influences were mainly films from the 1970s, describing it as "a buddy-buddy black comedy with a 70s feel to it, outlandish visual and verbal humour, left-field narrative turns, and the music of Glen Campbell", and also describing it as "The French Connection meets Hellzapoppin'", and of the location for the film, Albuquerque, New Mexico, as "William Eggleston meets René Magritte".

== Release ==
The film was scheduled to be released in Ireland and the United Kingdom on 30 September 2016, before being pushed back to 7 October to avoid competition with Deepwater Horizon and Miss Peregrine's Home for Peculiar Children, and was then set to compete against the UK release of Blood Father. It had a limited release in the United States on 3 February 2017.

=== Critical response ===
On the review aggregator website Rotten Tomatoes, 61% of 96 critics' reviews are positive, with an average rating of 5.6/10. The website's consensus reads: "War on Everyone boasts just enough dark humor and infectious energy to make this somewhat middling entry from writer-director John Michael McDonagh an entertaining diversion." Metacritic, which uses a weighted average, assigned the film a score of 50 out of 100, based on 21 critics, indicating "mixed or average" reviews.

Demetrios Matheou from IndieWire wrote: "I’m not sure if any bad cops in the whole genre of bad cop comedy have paid so little lip service to actual policing as the pair in John Michael McDonagh’s "War on Everyone." And I’m not sure that the genre has produced such an irresistibly funny film." Peter Debruge, Variety chief international film critic said, "McDonagh writes his clever, coal-black heart out, delivering another firecracker script, whose explosively entertaining execution boasts considerably more commercial potential than his previous two indies, Calvary and The Guard."

Vanity Fair wrote: "The opening sequences of War on Everyone are so furiously fast and funny it's nearly unimaginable that McDonagh can sustain the pace. And yet he does. When the script eases up on the rapid-fire quips, segueing into hilarious music cues (all that Campbell!) and slapstick violence, it brings its best game. Because these flawed but funny characters have dimension, depth, deep desires and, damn it, cry out for a franchise.’"
