= Berbers in France =

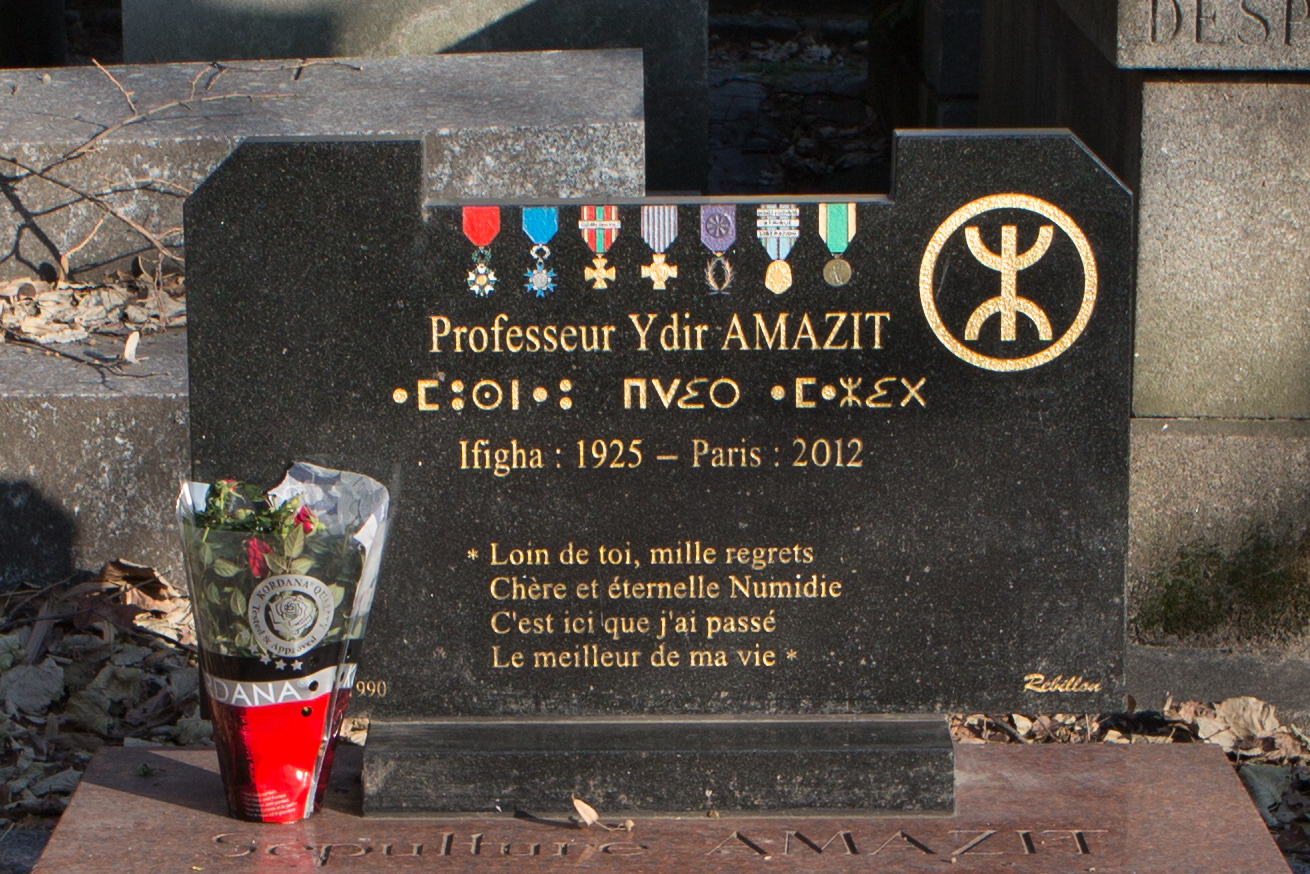

Total population
- over 2,000,000 (1.000.000 mio. Kabyles, 100.000 Riffians)

Regions with significant populations
- Paris, Marseille, Lyon, Strasbourg, Lille, Bordeaux, Toulouse.

Languages
- Berber, French, Arabic

Religion
- Majority Islam minority Christianity, Irreligion, Judaism

Related ethnic groups
- Berbers, Kabyle diaspora

Berbers in France are people of Berber descent (mainly Kabyles) living in France. Berbers in France, who generally call themselves Berbers, are estimated to number over 2 million people.

== History ==
Berber presence in France dates back to the early Muslim conquests, namely the Umayyad Caliphate's expansion in the 8th century, with Arab and Berber soldiers being part of the armies that conquered Septimania in southern France.

In the 8th century, the Berber Muslim leader Uthman ibn Naissa, better known as Munuza, formed his own principality based in Cerdanya on the eastern Pyrenees and allied with Odo the Great.

The archeological remains of pottery, metallurgy, the manufacture of weapons, forestry, the existence of distinctly Arab and Berber agricultural and pastoral practices, have all been discovered in Fraxinetum, an Islamic frontier state in Provence between about 887 and 972.

A significant Kabyle migration to France occurred in the late 19th and 20th centuries, largely due to French colonization in North Africa. The first waves came with military service or factory work during and after World War I, and large-scale migration continued after World War II to fill labor shortages, accelerating post-Algerian independence in 1962. Since the 1960s, Berbers in France have been active in forming cultural and political organizations, advocating for civil rights, and contributing to the vibrant Maghrebi community in France.

In 2016, archaeologists discovered what are believed to be early medieval Muslim graves in Nîmes, France, belonging to three Berber warriors from the 7th and 8th centuries. The DNA of the skeletons showed strong links to North Africa, most likely south-west Morocco. The graves provide archaeological evidence for the Berber presence in southern France during the early Muslim conquests.

== Notable people ==
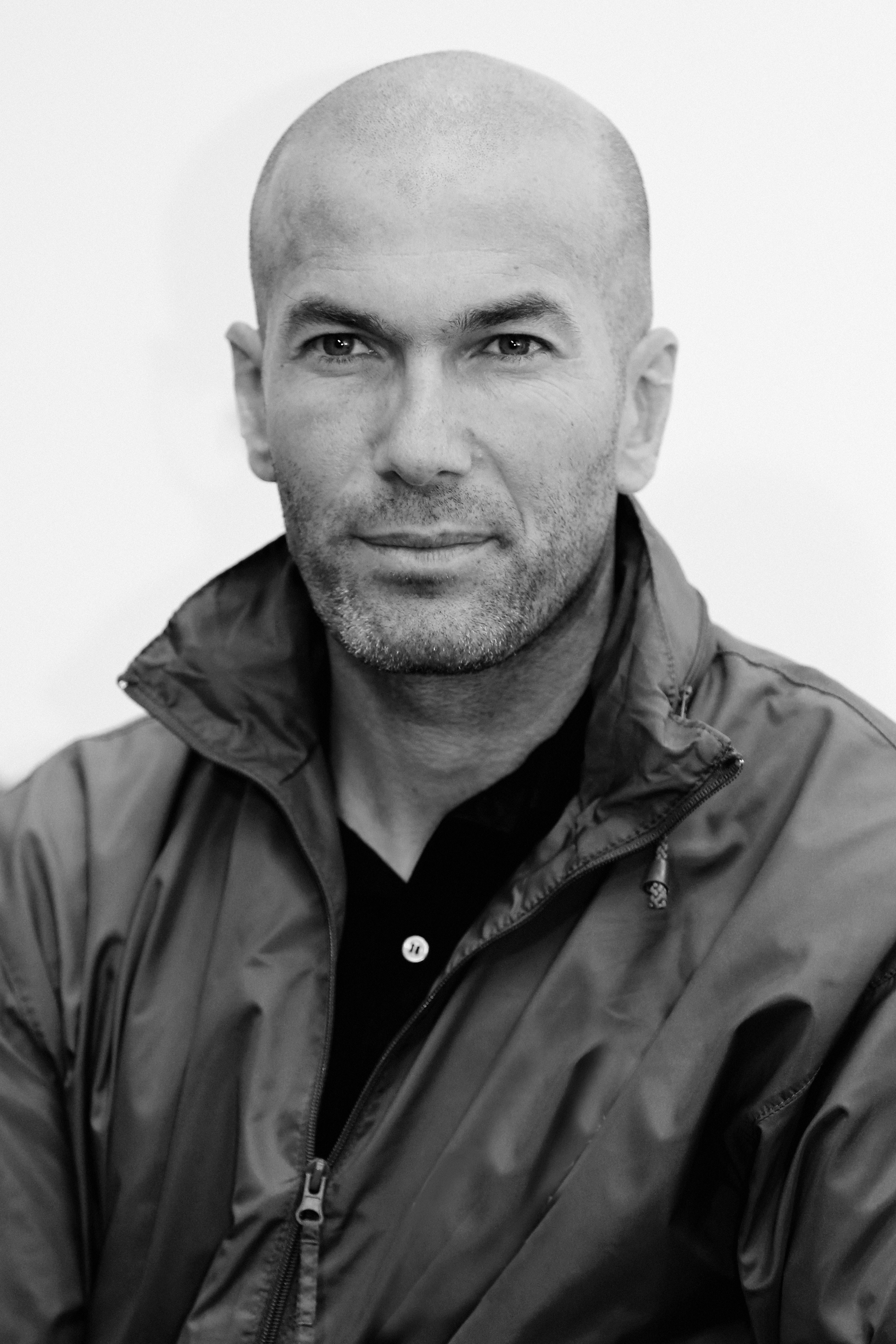
Zinedine Zidane

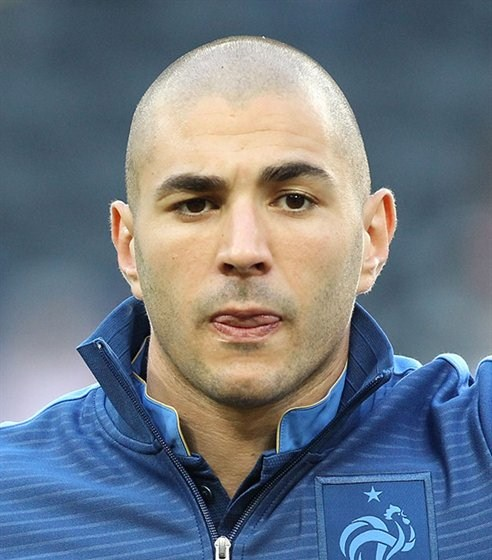
Karim Benzema

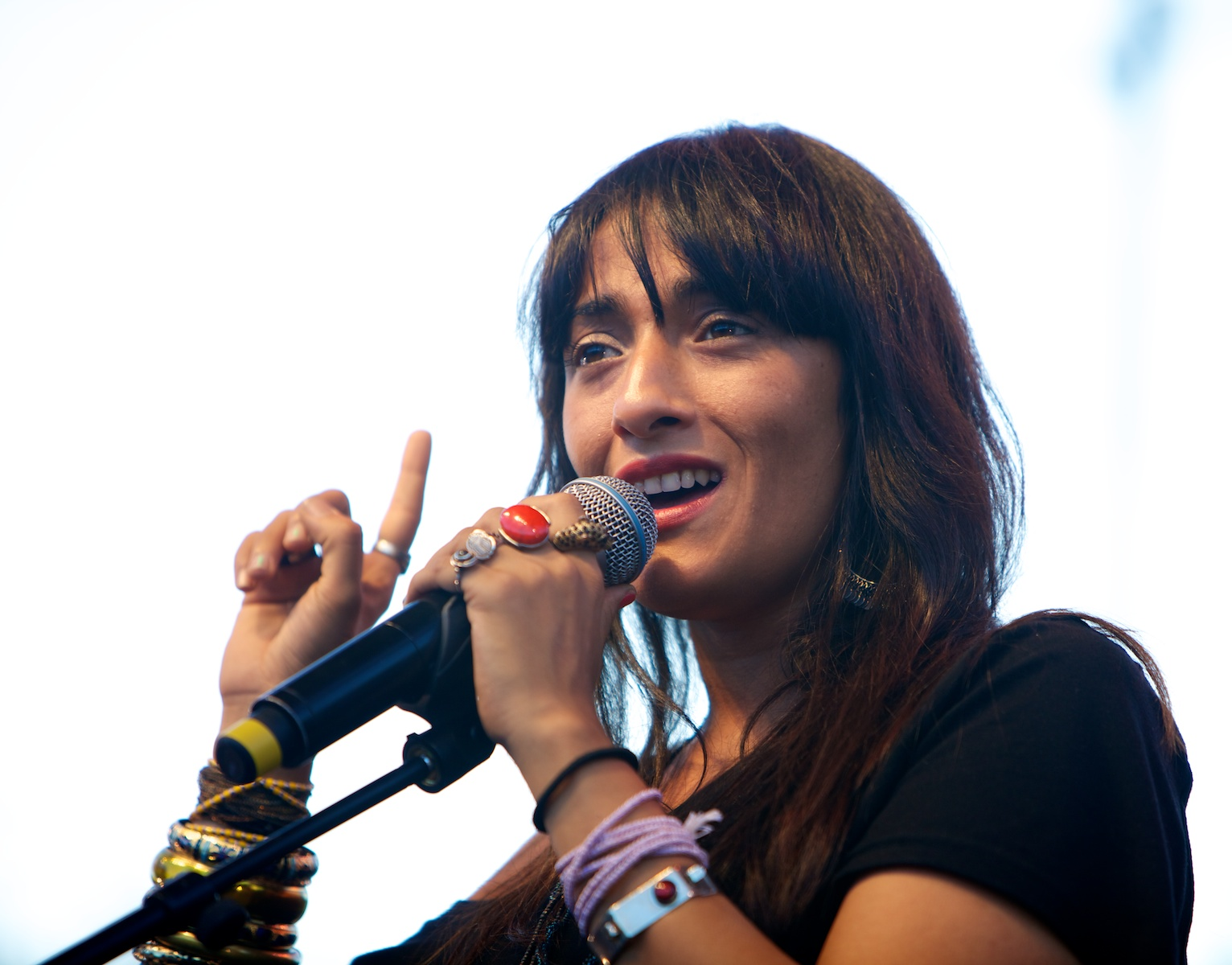
Hindi Zahra

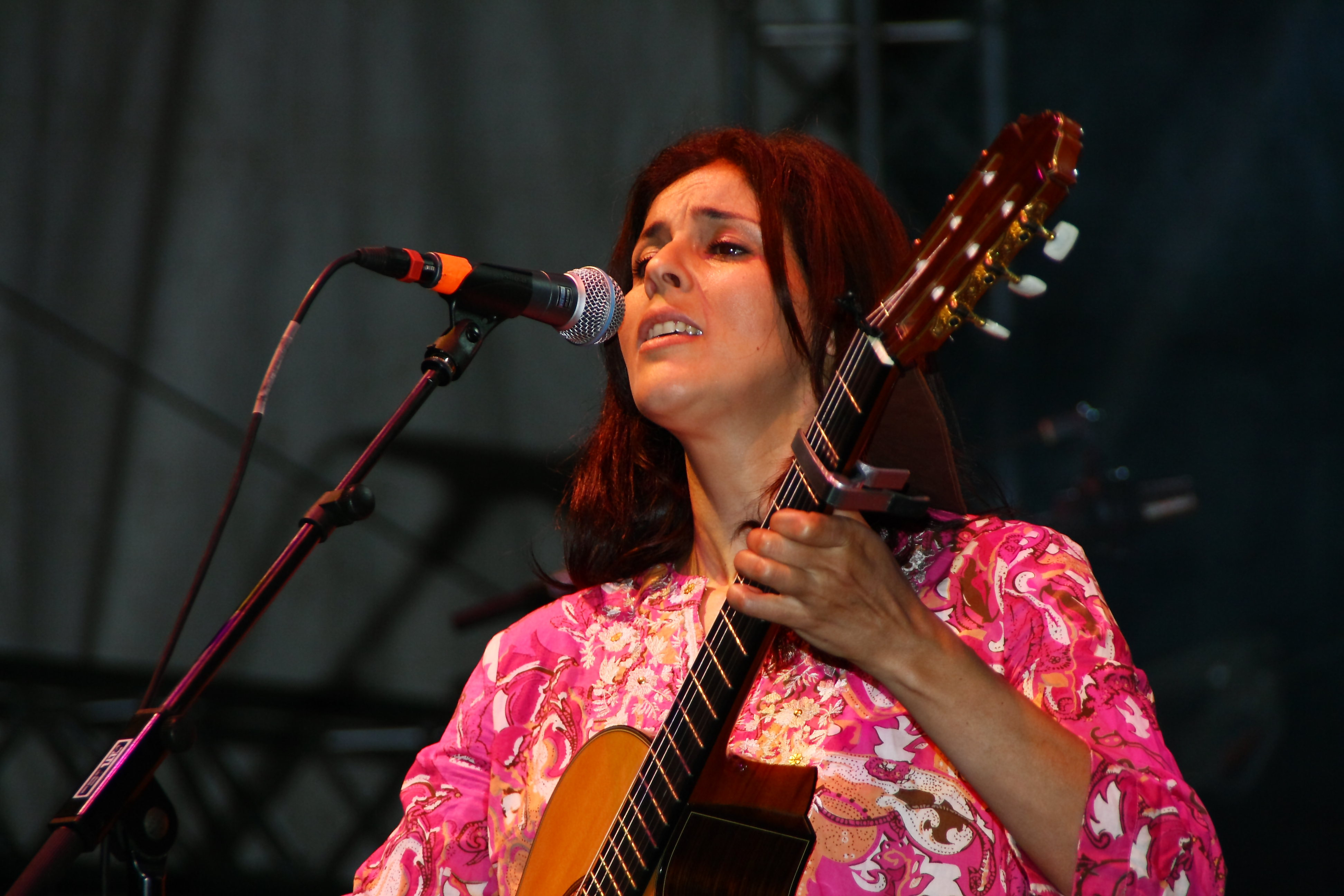
Souad Massi

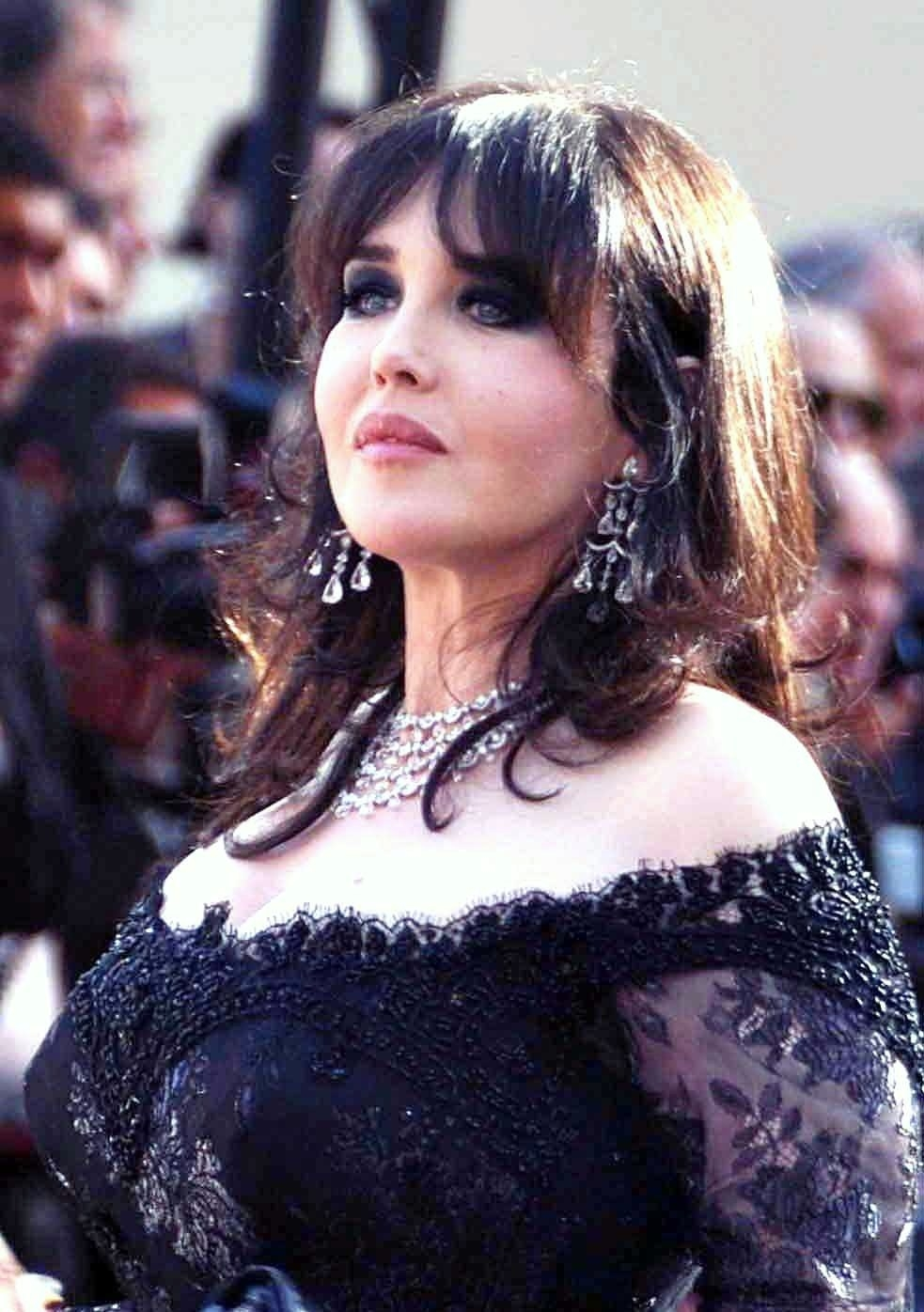
Isabelle Adjani

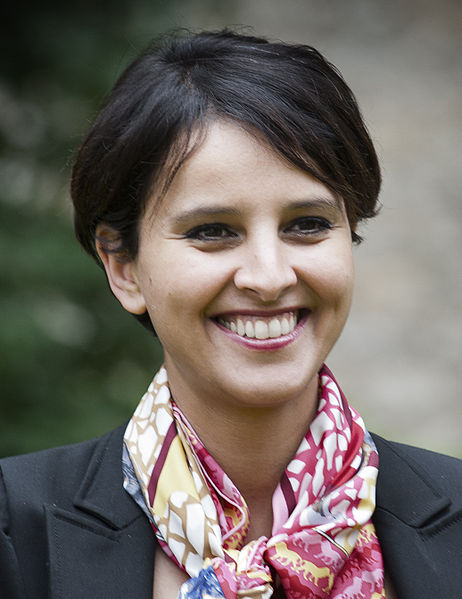
Najat Vallaud-Belkacem

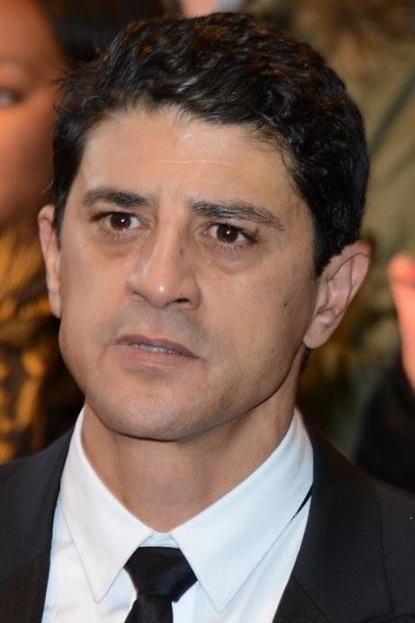
Saïd Taghmaoui

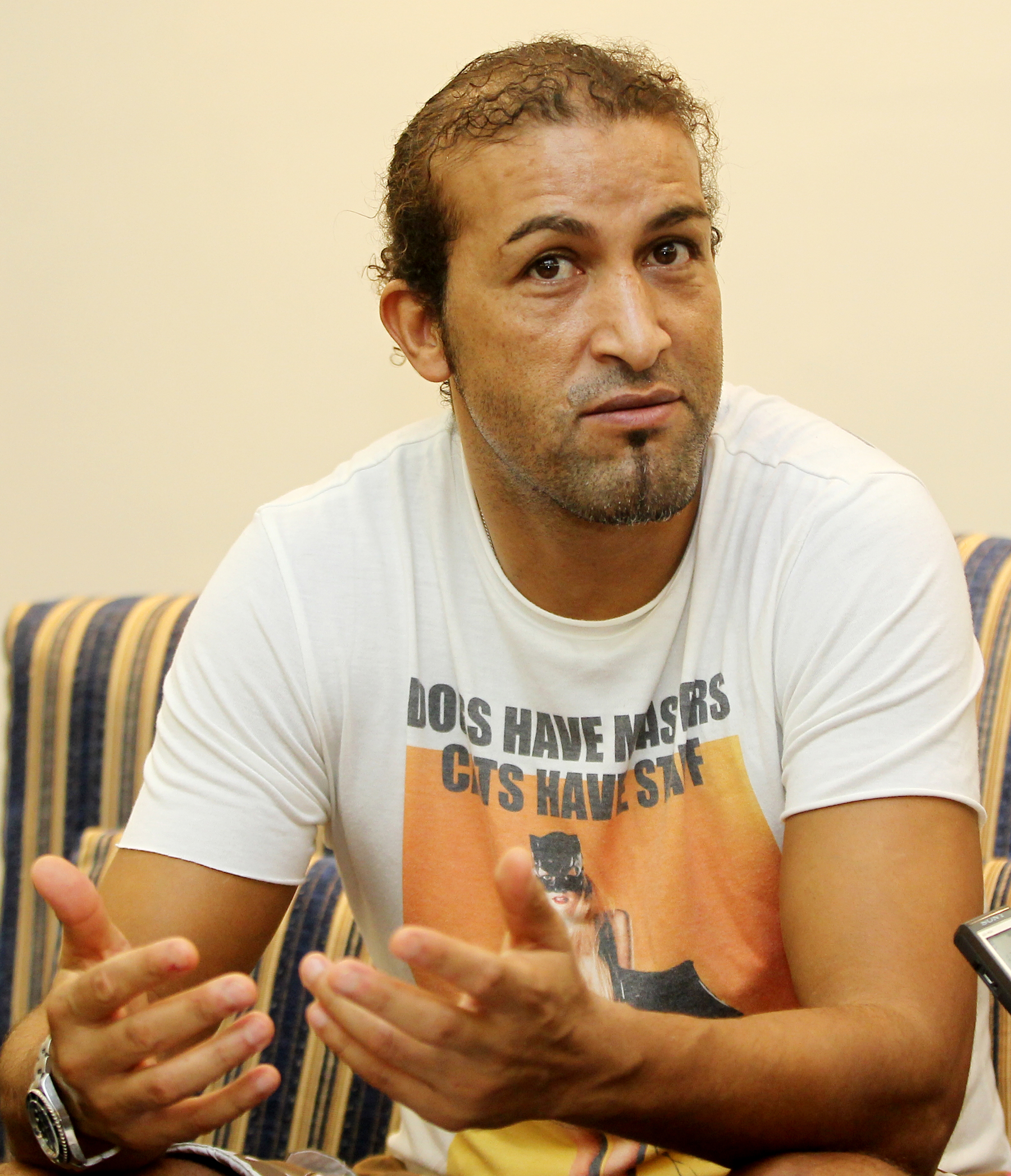
Mustapha Hadji

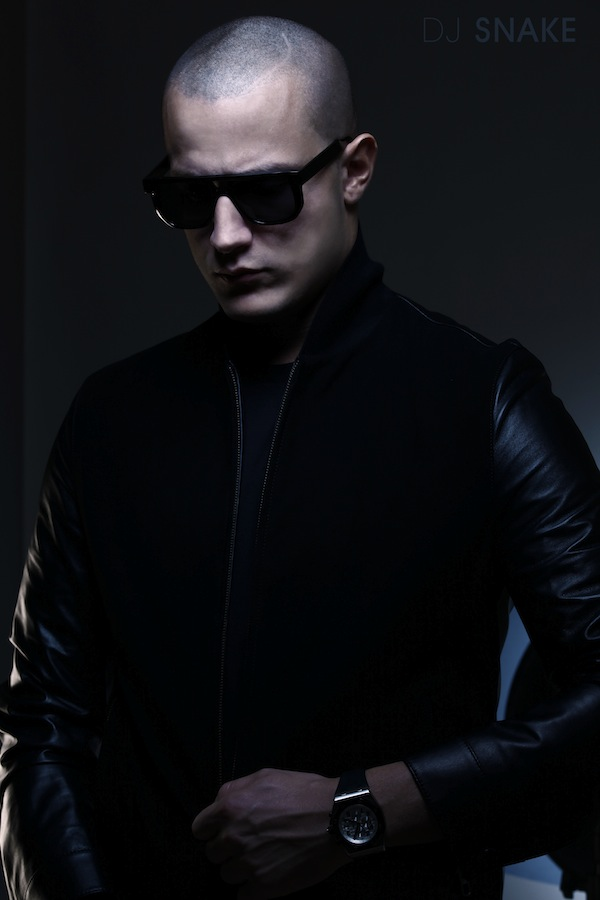
DJ Snake

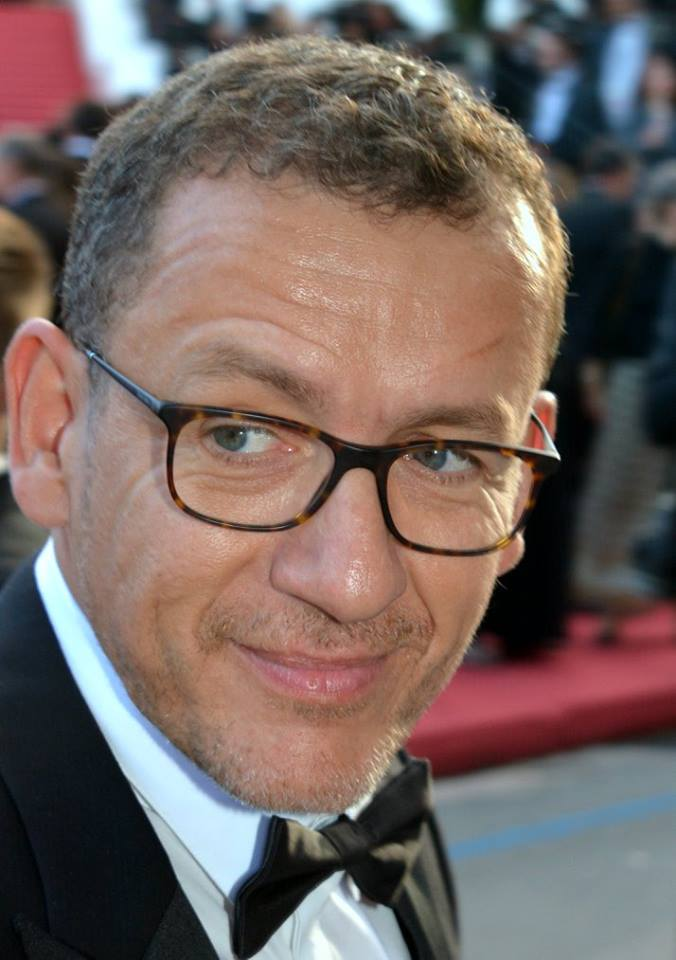
Dany Boon

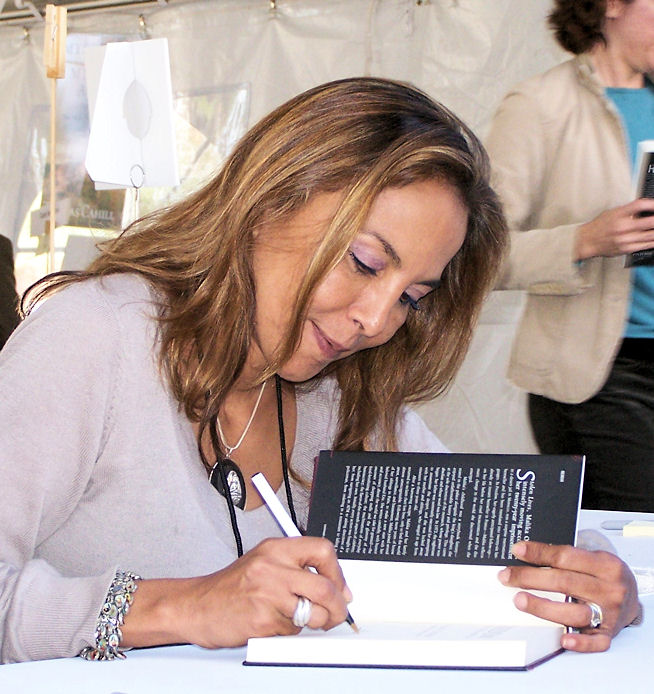
Malika Oufkir

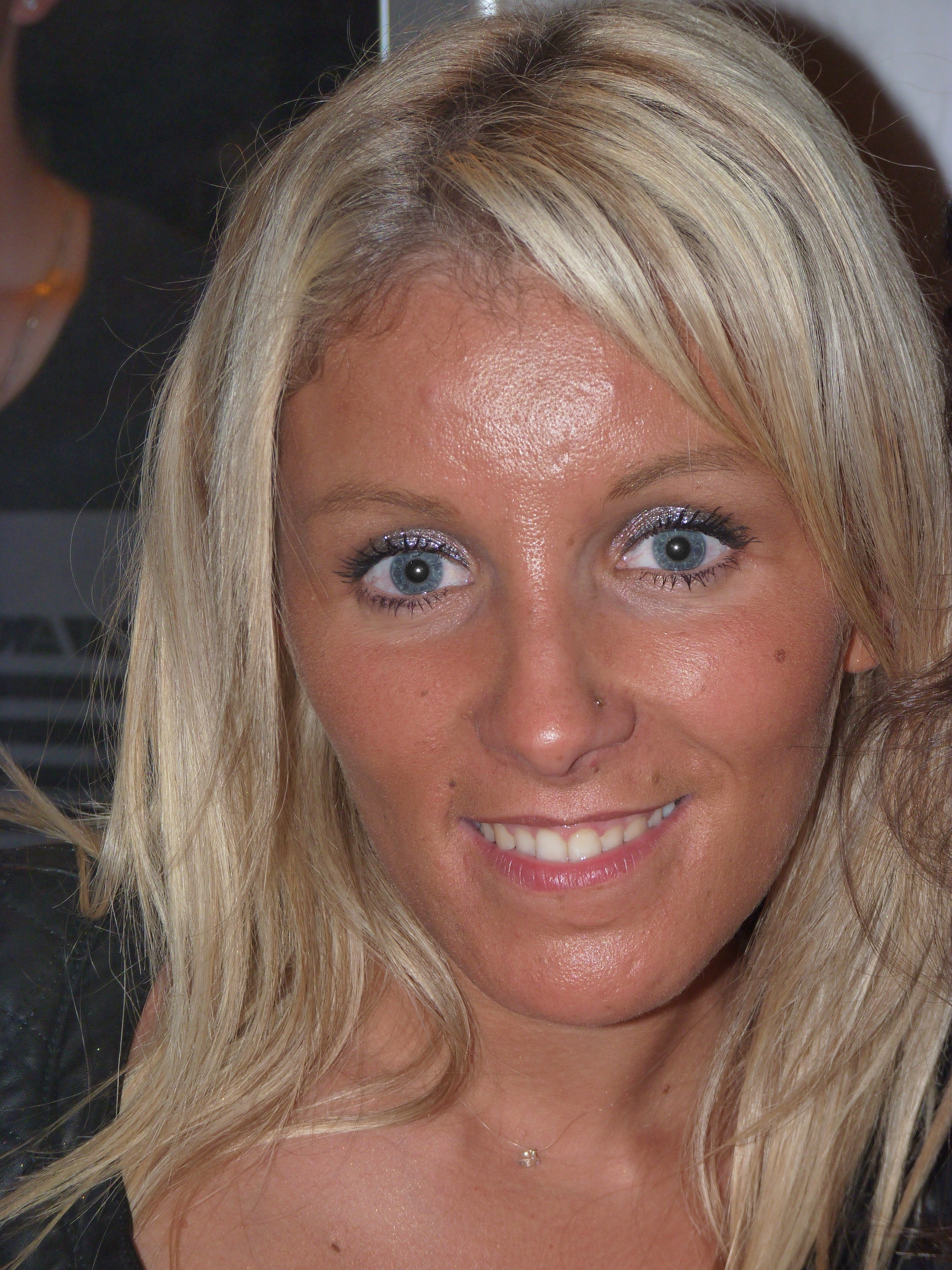
Myriam Abel

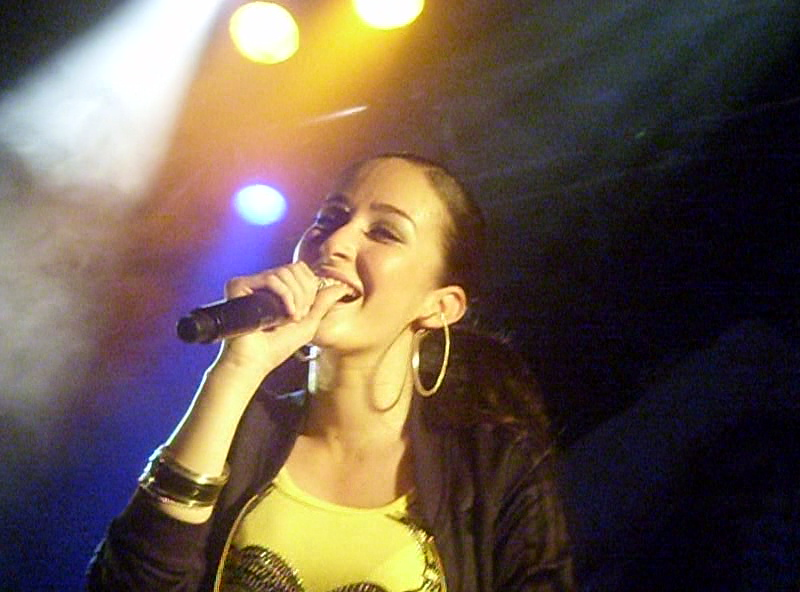
Kenza Farah

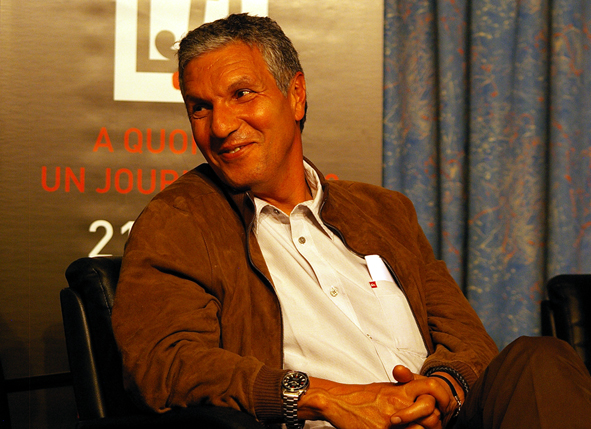
Rachid Arhab

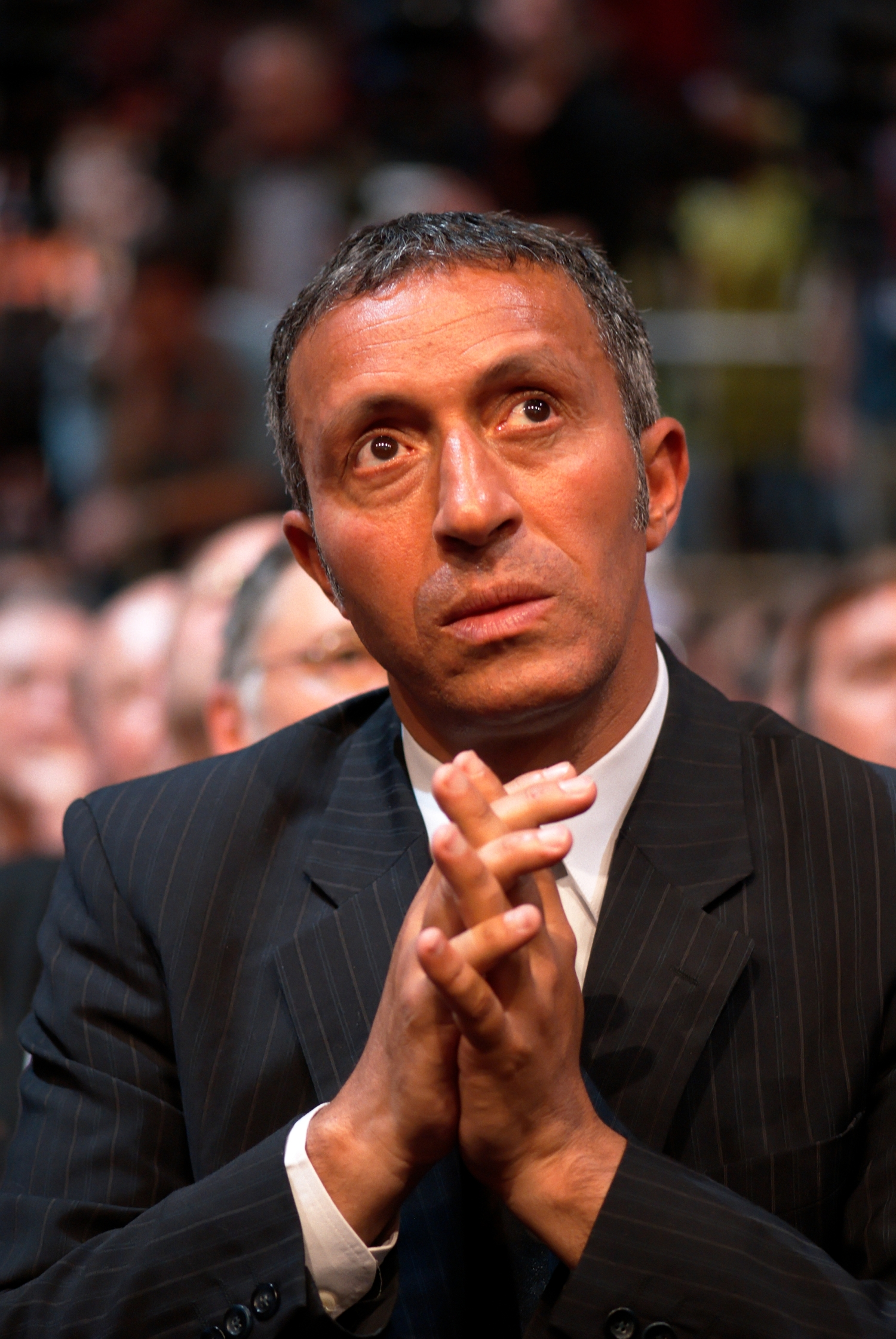
Azouz Begag

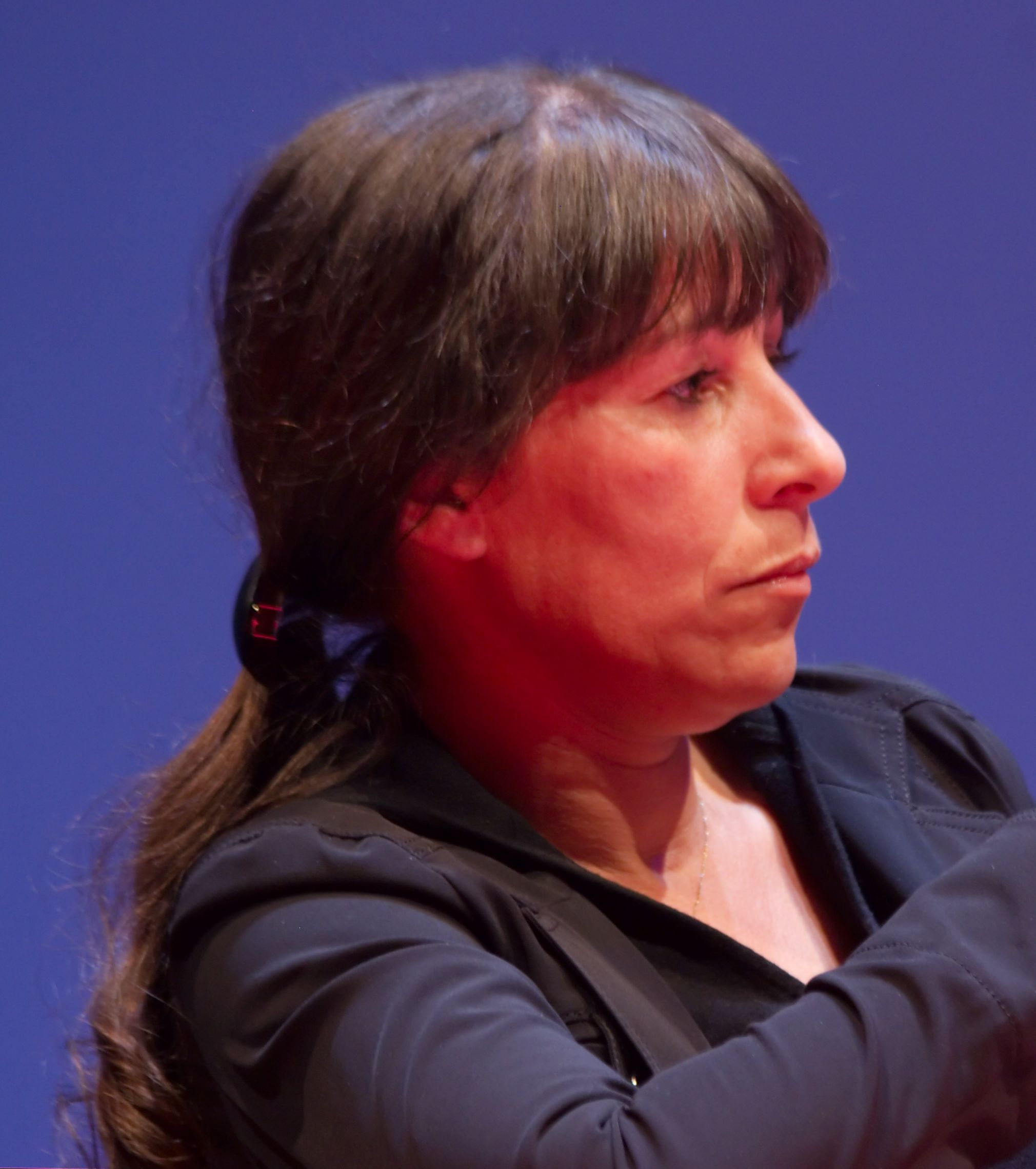
Fadela Amara

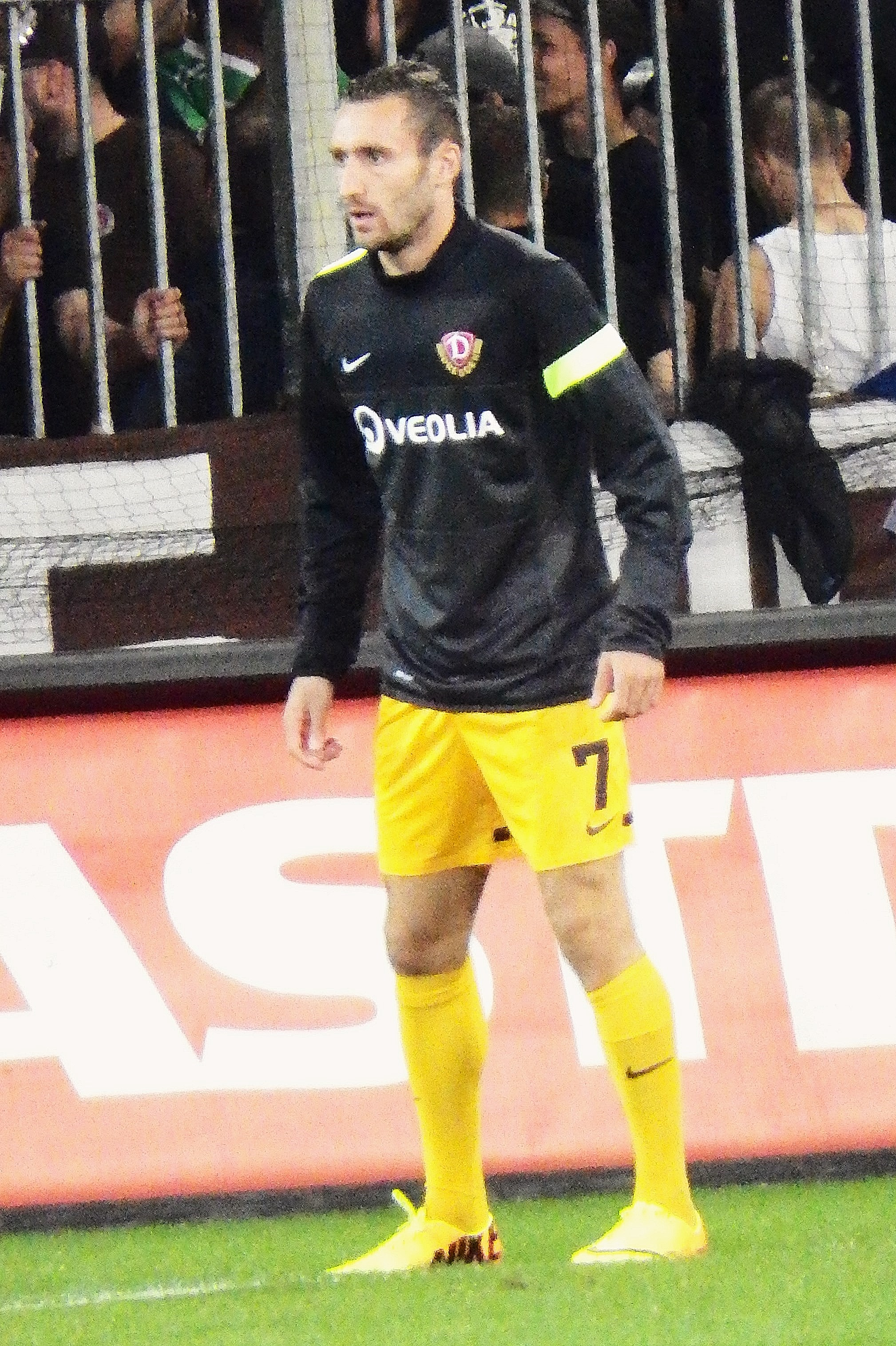
Idir Ouali

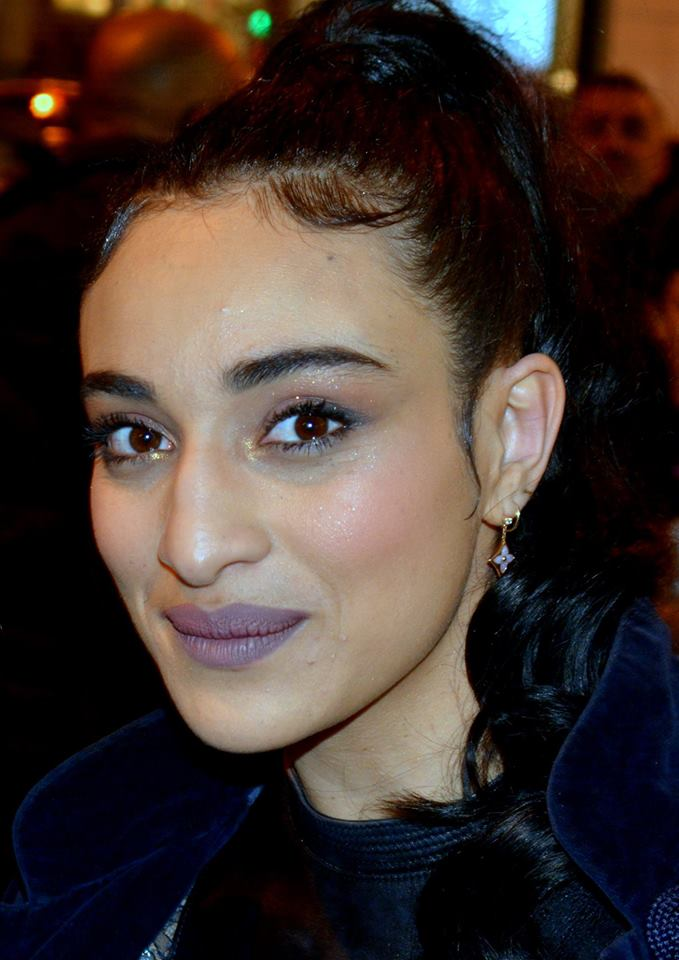
Camélia Jordana

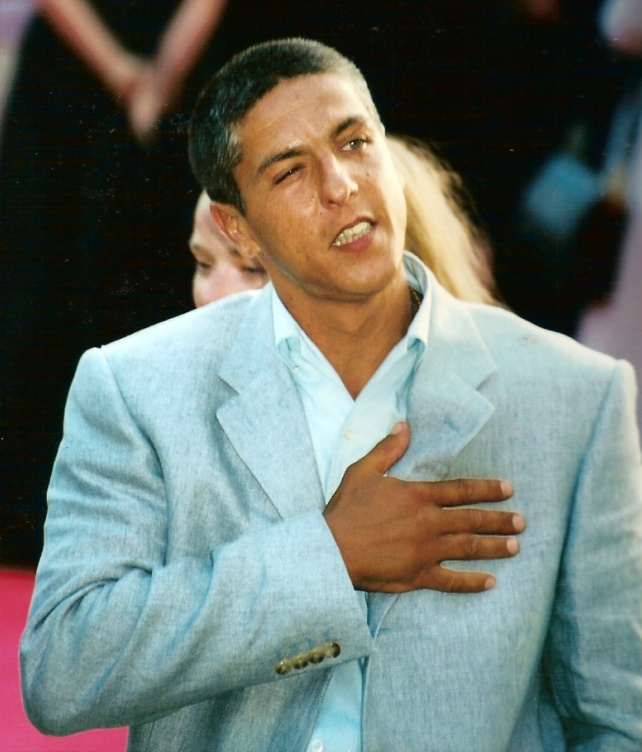
Samy Naceri

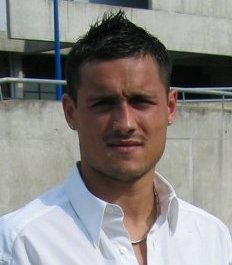
Karim Ziani

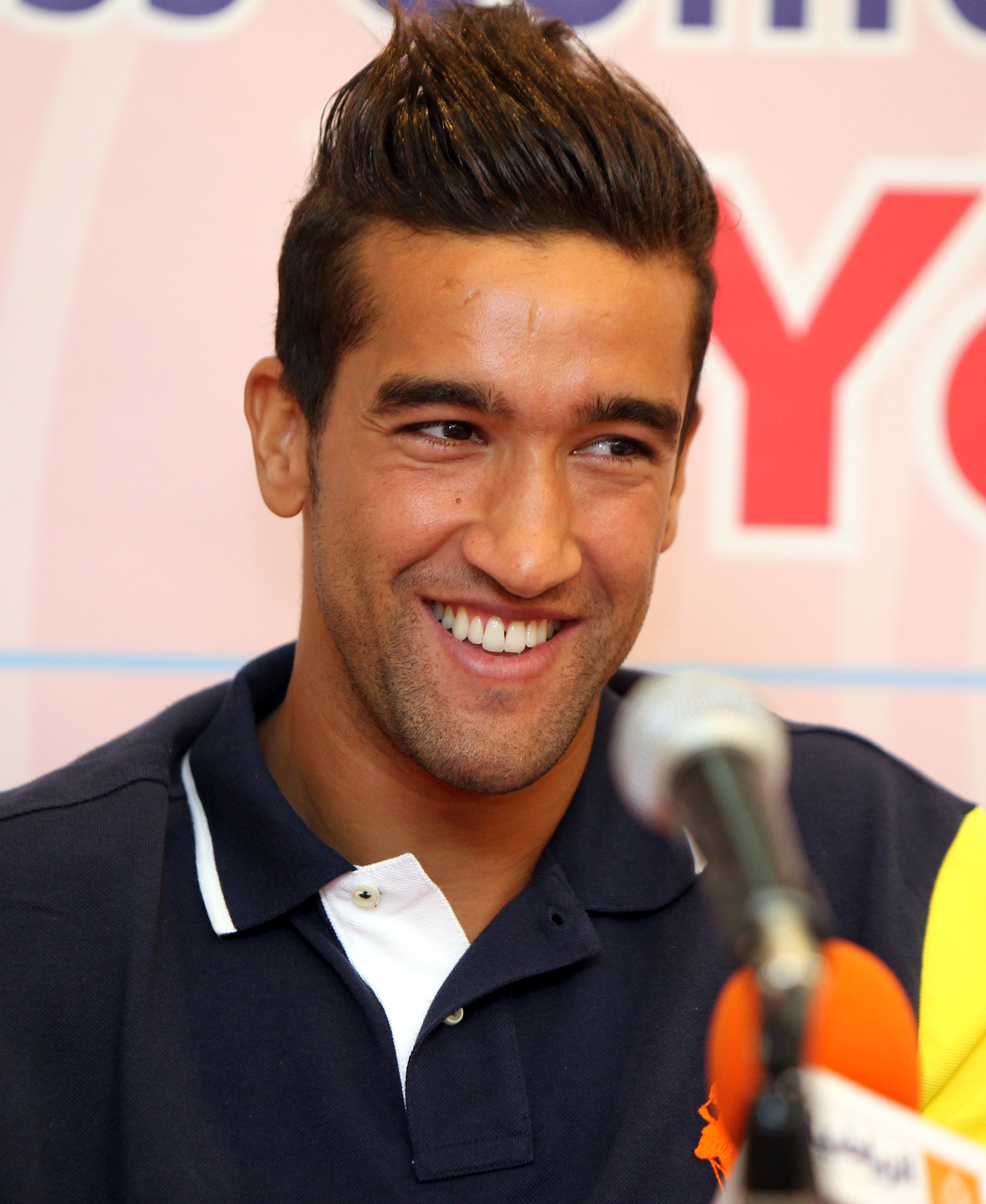
Youssouf Hadji

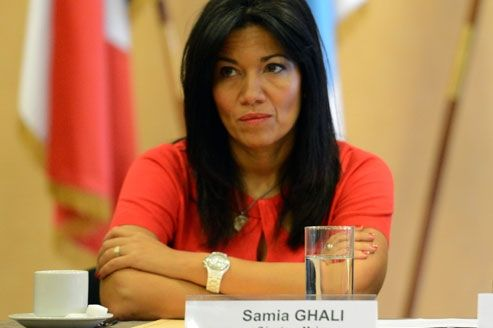
Samia Ghali

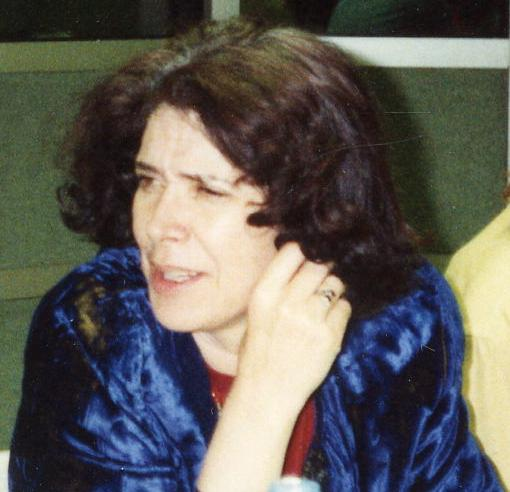
Assia Djebar

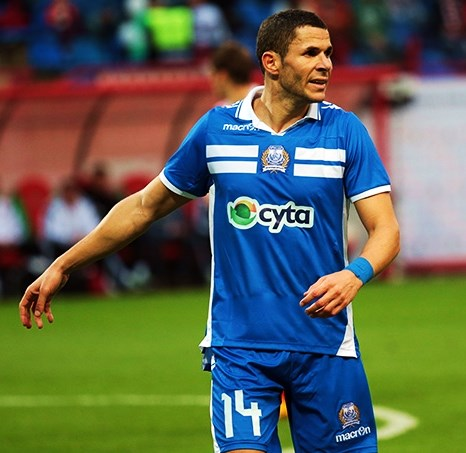
Camel Meriem

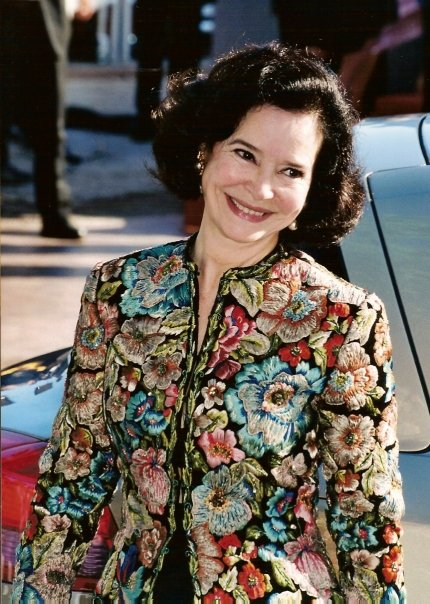
Marie-José Nat

== See also ==
- Berbers
- Berber Academy
