= Jérôme Cohen-Olivar =

French film director and screenwriter

- Born: 1964 (age 61–62)
- Citizenship: Moroccan
- Occupation: film director
- Known for: Kandisha
- Notable work: Susan Susan
- Awards: Prize of the Ecumenical Jury 'Midnight Orchestra'

Jérôme Cohen-Olivar (born 1964) is a Moroccan-French film director, best known for Kandisha (2008), a fantasy film inspired by the myth of Aicha Kandicha.

== Life ==
Cohen-Olivar mostly grew up in Morocco, where he made movies on super 8mm film, before moving to Los Angeles. Susan Susan, his first short film, was a satire about secret immigration to the United States, bought by Disney for about $300,000.

The Midnight Orchestra, a comedy based around the story of a man travelling to Morocco to revive his father's orchestra, examined the experiences of Jews leaving Morocco. It won the Prize of the Ecumenical Jury at Montreal World Film Festival in 2015.

== Works ==
- Susan Susan, 1987 (short)
- Cool Crime, 1999
- Kandisha, 2008
- The Midnight Orchestra (L'orchestre de minuit), 2015
- The 16th Episode / Little Horror Movie, 2018
