= Zaâma d'Banlieue =

Zaâma d'Banlieue was a female-led collective for immigrant youth in the suburbs of Lyon, France which existed between 1979 and 1984. The four founding leaders were Djida Tazdaït (born in 1957), Tim (born in 1959), Nadia (born in 1960) et Farida (born in 1954), and were all either of Algerian origin or nationality and lived in Lyon's suburbs. Zaâma d'Banlieue became officially registered under the acronym the "Youth Expression Association" (Association expression jeunes immigrés) on 19 October 1982.

Zaâma d'Banlieue denounced police abuse and violence and was engaged in feminism within the family and social circles. Zaâma d'Banlieue aimed to spark self-organization among youth within Lyon's suburbs.

The collective was dissolved during the 'National Conferences of Youth Associations of Immigrant Origins' (Assises nationales des associations de jeunes issus de l'immigration) between 9 and 11 June 1984 in Villeurbanne and Vaulx-en-Velin.

== Origins ==
=== National context ===
The experience of North Africans in France during the late 1970s and 1980s was characterized by racism and extreme violence. Recurrent issues during these decades were racial killings committed by both civilians and police.

=== Launch ===
Growing up in the backdrop of the aftermath of the Algerian war, the future founders of Zaâma d'Banlieue experienced strong discrimination in their childhoods. While females with a Maghreb immigration background were at the time not with many in French secondary education, the collective's leaders pioneered in high school where they familiarised themselves with the political extreme left, anarchism, and liberalism.

Djida Tazdaït, Tim, Nadia, and Farida were all of Algerian origin or nationality and lived in Lyon's suburbs in the 1980s. The women knew each other before setting up the collective, as they were active and present within similar cultural and activist circles in the Croix-Rousse district and together attended rock concerts in Lyon. Nadia in 2009 stated to have met the other founders through mutual friends when arriving in Lyon between 1980 and 1981. Djida Tazdaït referred to their initial encounters having taken place during a series of meetings with Informations Rassemblées à Lyon (I.R.L., at the time an anti-expulsion committee) which are estimated to have taken place in 1979 on 13 rue Pierre-Blanc.

Influenced by two distinct events, the four women decided to create the collective. Firstly, the death of Lahouri, a 17-year old teenager who was assassinated by a policeman during an identity control, sparked outrage within the women's local networks. Second, familiarising themselves with Rock Against Police (a group of young immigrants advocating for a degree of autonomy in the struggle in the suburbs of Paris) further confirmed and encouraged the leaders' desire to advocate in the suburbs of Lyon.

Because there was no specific meeting or event that marked off the official launch of the collective, the exact date of Zaâma d'Banlieue's birth is unclear. The commencement of the collective's activities and the leaders' meetings are in various accounts suggested to have taken place between 1979 and 1983. Formerly involved activists, for instance, associate the collective's coming-into-being with their involvement in a hunger strike against the Imbert Decree in early 1980, while others refer to 19 November 1980 when a wave of arrests took place in the neighborhood of Place Gabriel-Péri.

In an interview in 1981, Djida emphasized that with respect to the initiations of youth mobilizations in the suburbs, Lyon was different from Paris and Marseille because in Lyon there was not a singular event that served acted as a 'trigger' for activist movements.

=== Initial character ===
With initially approximate twenty members, Zaâma d'Banlieue activists viewed themselves as members of a network rather than of an official organization. Zaâma d'Banlieue viewed the collectivity of more institutionalized local organizations to be at the cost of the individual members' freedoms of expression and to not be able to account for specific problems of people with Maghreb immigration roots. The collective thus enjoyed a more direct character as well as a more spontaneous one compared to other organizations, which was reflected in the way its activists were mobilized. Activists were reached directly through close social ties between individuals, for instance through friends and family networks. Further, the organized actions and modes of operation were also mainly organized through random operation.

== Thematic focus ==
=== Police and injustice ===
Zaâma d'Banlieue initially took a stance against inappropriate and unjust policing and denounced "abusive identity checks, bullying, humiliation and diverse instances of police violence". Grievance was particularly on the harsh punishments of petty crime conducted by youth in the suburbs, which greatly contrasted against perceived laxity in the sentencing of individuals suspected of homicide on teenagers with a Maghreb immigration background. The demands of Zaâma d'Banlieue also concerned expulsions of young foreigners sentenced for delinquent acts. Zaâma d'Banlieue defended the legitimacy of such delinquencies conducted by the youth.

=== Feminism and teenaged girls with immigration backgrounds ===
Zaâma d'Banlieue further focused on the situation of girls with Maghreb origins within their family space and surrounding society in France. The collective's feminism-related discourse combined criticism on the family with a general critique on the conditions of existence of women at large. Girls' difficulties within families were viewed to reflect the difficulties of confirming oneself at the level of society. Zaâma d'Banlieue considered gendered societal and familial issues as one and hereby actively prevented any discourse particularly directed against Muslim male figures within families individually. Female activists emphasized the need to avoid any stigmatization of brothers and fathers in the feminist discourse.

The positioning of female activists of the collective in relation to feminism translated into awareness-raising activities and participation in mobilizations relating to abortion. Depending on the context, femininity was central in the collective's discourse and was sometimes used as a resource of mobilization.

- In "Tim a dit je veux" ("Tim said I want"), for instance, the collective's co-founder Tim focused on gender issues within social and family relations, in which she called for a revolt within relations with parents and family and for claiming the right to speak within these families as well as in the overarching social world.
- At other times, the collective used neutral discourse to for instance mobilize younger people in surrounding districts, with a stronger emphasis on the larger community of experiences rather than individual ones.

== Main activities ==
=== Main activity modes ===
Zaâma d'Banlieue's two main modes of activity were the organization of free rock concerts for Maghreb immigrant youth in the suburbs, and the irregular publication of a four-page journal.

=== Journal Zaâma d'Banlieue ===
A total of three journal issues was published: the first in May 1981, the second in November 1981 and the third in May 1982. The contents varied from general analyses of issues to promotions of activist events. This provided Zaâma d'Banlieue with the means to spread their information and to make cultural spaces accessible to everyone; and to also "trigger other similar initiatives: collectives in the cities that directly take charge of their leisure activities, their living spaces, their daily resistance, to cops, controls, militias, arrests and arbitrary convictions".

=== Concerts ===
One of the concerts that Zaâma d'Banlieue organized took place on 6 June 1981 in Saint-Fons, which was attended by approximately 400 teenagers from Lyon's suburbs.

=== Mobilisations and actions ===
Besides from concerts, Zaâma d'Banlieue organized multiple mobilizations during its livelihood. Mobilisations and protests which received high publicity include:

- Activists participated in a hunger strike of students in 1980 to denounce the Imbert Decree of December 31, 1979, which restricted foreign students' university access by requiring them to participate in a pre-registration procedure and a language test in their home countries.
- Zaâma d'Banlieue had a strong presence throughout the summer of 1982. The collective was present in committees that supported incarcerated youngsters. On 31 October, Zaâma d'Banleue organized a manifestation in the city center of Lyon and the collective publicly denounced the release of the assassinator who killed a teenager named Kader in Vitry.
- The collective succeeded to mobilize approximately 600 participants on 11 November 1982 in response to two allegedly radially motivated deaths.
- On 26 March 1983, another mobilization was organized following the release of the assassinator of one of these teenagers.

Furthermore, Zaâma d'Banlieue offered alternatives to girls who were in situations of family breakdown. Examples include providing girls from ruptured homes with resources including housing, attempting to bypass families and residential structures.

==== Critique on local initiatives ====
Zaâma d'Banlieue publicly denounced the hunger strike organized by priest Christian Delorme and the pastor Jean Costil against the deportation of Abdenabi Kebaili. The collective's leaders criticized this protest and opposed Delorme for trying to establish himself as a mediator.

The collective opposed Delorme's approach of turning the youth into an object which he represented, rather than treating them as allies for cooperation. Through these denouncements, Zaâma d'Banlieue hereby confirmed the significance of their own approach, which did not rely on any intermediaries on behalf of the teenagers, immigrants and French in the suburbs of Lyon.

== Evolvement and reorientation ==
Depending on the surrounding contexts, stakes and locations of operation, the course of action of Zaâma d'Banlieue varied and shifted over time.

=== Geographical expansion ===
Zaâma d'Banlieue's main territory in Lyon's suburbs was in Croix-Rousse. Throughout its course, the collective attempted to expand geographically, despite restrictions imposed by the social and local character of the network. These expansions, however, imposed challenges to the collective's consideration and determination of significance between various events and happenings.

Emphasis steadily increased on an approach and form of operation that encouraged individual spontaneity and individually-initiated forms of organization. This is reflected in the collective's increased efforts for establishing collective apartments, which would allow to develop alternative modes of social organization to the family and the State, and particularly to take care of girls on the loose.

=== Thematic reorientations ===
Between 1981 and 1984, the Minguettes' mobilization, as well as violent deaths of youth with Maghreb backgrounds in France, impacted on the orientations of Zaâma d'Banlieue's activism.

- In 1981, Zaâma d'Banlieue became connected with 'Minguettes' teenagers from a residential neighborhood in Vénissieux in the suburbs of Lyon, who had in that year set up a committee to support Sélim Gueshi and Nordine Hammar.
- On 28 September 1982, Ahmed Boutelja was killed by a security guard with two bullets in his back, in Bron. In the same year, Wahid Hachichi was assassinated by a police officer on 28 October, in Lyon. These deaths were among many that year and greatly impacted sentiments in the suburbs, as an account of a resident from the Lyonian suburbs, for example, described solidarity within his own district at this time, but an impression that he could not enter the city center.

Following these events, Zaâma d'Banlieue's center of focus shifted. Rather than the previous focus on French youth and immigrants from the suburbs, the collective now set its target audience more broadly on the French in general. The collective also became involved with the "Collectif Lyonnais des Associations Autonomes", which was created after the hunger strike of Monmousseau from 28 March to 8 April 1983. The local presence of this new overarching collective, as well as a regional collective of associations working with immigration, further fostered Zaâma d'Banlieue's reorientation.

Zaâma d'Banlieue began to assert itself more as a regional network whose ambition was to respond to the recent killings. This reformulation of its ambitions, now focusing on a larger territory, created tensions with other local organizations that were structured on a territorial basis.

According to A.N.G.I., these developments constituted a weakness of the group as it wasn't established in a specific district. Its geographical and gradual thematic reorientations were as result over the years met with a certain distrust.

== Final Years and Dissolution ==
In 1984, approximately ten autonomous associations co-existed in Lyon's surroundings that were occupied with youth with immigrant heritage. During this year, Zaâma d'Banlieue's presence was by the A.N.G.I. noted to be fading. The collective's four leaders, however, were simultaneously described to nonetheless have been among the principal driving force behind the organization of the "Assises Nationales des associations de jeunes". During these three-day meetings held in Villeurbanne and Vaulx-en-Velin between the 9th to 11 June 1984, Zaâma d'Banlieue was dissolved.

Zaâma d'Banlieue's former leaders, however, remained principal actors in the Movement Beur, the "Arab movement", in France.
