= John Michael McDonagh =

British-Irish filmmaker

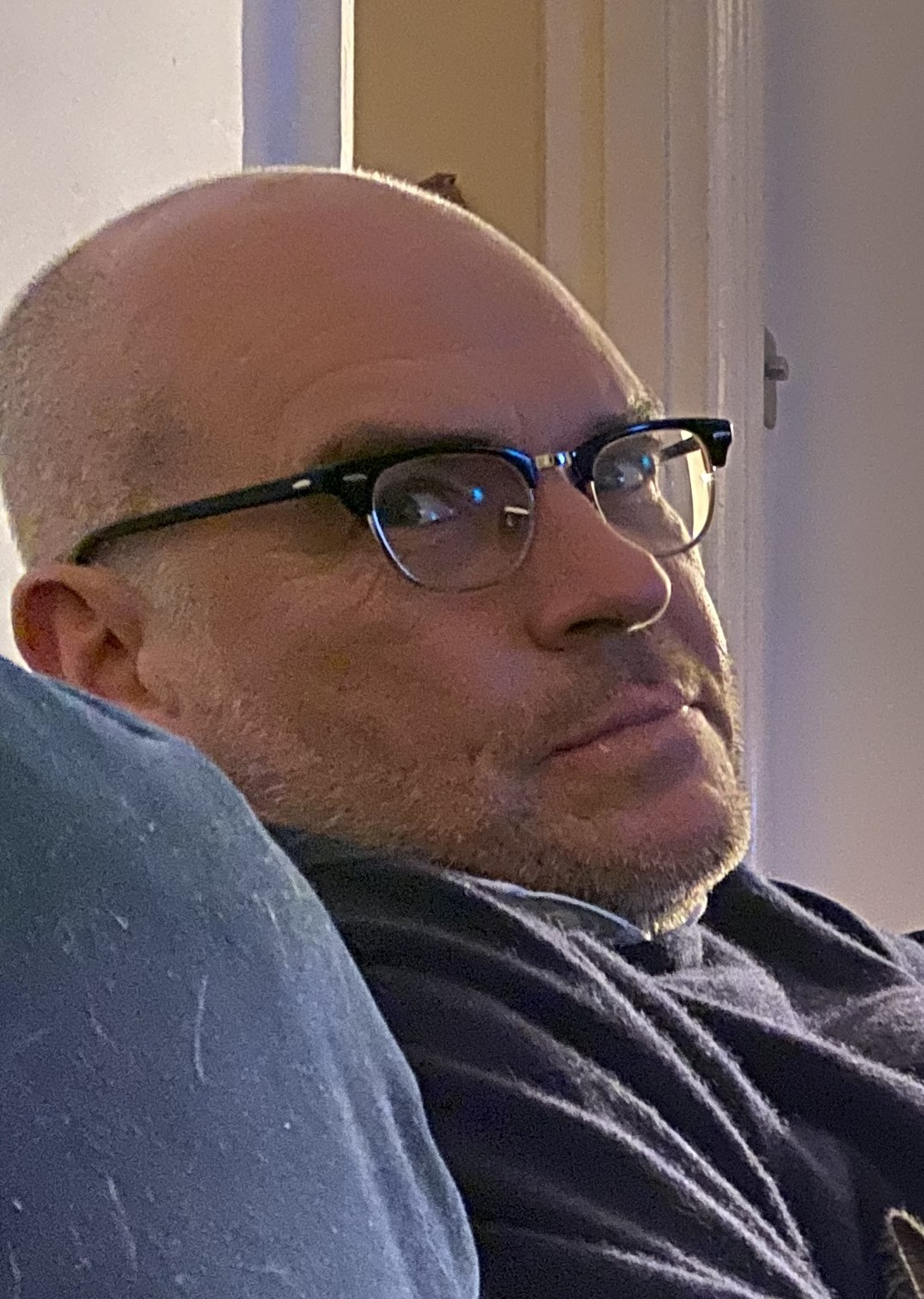
- McDonagh in 2020
- Born: 1967 (age 58–59); London, England
- Occupation: Filmmaker
- Spouse: Elizabeth Eves (m. 2003)
- Relatives: Martin McDonagh (brother)

John Michael McDonagh (born 1967) is an Irish filmmaker. He wrote and directed The Guard (2011) and Calvary (2014), with the former earning him a nomination for the BAFTA Award for Best Original Screenplay.

== Early life ==
John Michael McDonagh was born to Irish parents in the Camberwell area of London in 1967. His mother was a part-time housekeeper from Killeenduff, while his father was a construction worker from Lettermullen. He holds both British and Irish citizenship, referring to himself as "London Irish" because he does not "feel particularly British [or] particularly Irish". His younger brother Martin is a playwright and filmmaker. He and his brother were raised in Camberwell while spending summers in Killeenduff. They both dropped out of secondary school and were unemployed. When he was 26 years old, his parents moved back to Lettermullen, which allowed him to regularly travel to nearby Galway.

== Career ==
McDonagh initially pursued a career as a novelist but decided to try screenwriting after his first five books, which he later described as "really bad", were rejected by publishers. He made his first foray by writing and directing the short film The Second Death (2000), on which his brother served as an executive producer. McDonagh adapted Robert Drewe's novel Our Sunshine (1991) into the screenplay for the film Ned Kelly (2003). Directed by Gregor Jordan, the film received mixed reviews and was not the resulting film McDonagh had hoped to see; he later revealed that he did not get along with Jordan, whom he called "a pretty humourless man".

McDonagh had his breakthrough as a filmmaker when he wrote and directed The Guard (2011), making his feature-length directorial debut at the age of 44. The film received critical acclaim, becoming the most financially successful independent Irish film of all time. Among several honours, McDonagh was nominated for the BAFTA Award for Best Original Screenplay. His next film, Calvary (2014), received acclaim. His next two films, War on Everyone (2016) and The Forgiven (2021), received mixed reviews.

In 2014, McDonagh spoke of plans to end the "trilogy" he started with The Guard and Calvary with a film titled The Lame Shall Enter First. It will follow a paraplegic ex-policeman in London who has developed a hatred for non-disabled people and gets caught up in a new investigation after one of his friends is murdered. It is intended to be an amalgamation of themes and tones present in the first two films. He has also mentioned numerous other forthcoming projects such as Fear Is the Rider, a thriller starring Abbey Lee and Christopher Abbott; and The Bonnot Gang, a period gangster film about the titular French anarchist gang;

McDonagh frequently works with the same actors, including Brendan Gleeson, Liam Cunningham, David Wilmot, Marie-Josée Croze, and Caleb Landry Jones. He has also frequently worked with cinematographer Larry Smith and composer Lorne Balfe.

== Personal life ==
McDonagh has been married to Australian film producer Elizabeth Eves since 2003.

== Filmography ==
Short film

Year	Title	Director	Writer
2000	The Second Death	Yes	Yes

Feature film

Year	Title	Director	Writer	Producer
2003	Ned Kelly	No	Yes	No
2011	The Guard	Yes	Yes	No
2014	Calvary	Yes	Yes	No
2016	War on Everyone	Yes	Yes	No
2021	The Forgiven	Yes	Yes	Yes
