= The Freedom of the City =

1973 play by Brian Friel

- Program cover from the London premiere at the Royal Court Theatre, 1973.
- Original language: English
- Written by: Brian Friel
- Characters: Michael Hegarty; Lily Doherty "Skinner" Fitzgerald; Dr. Dodds; Brigadier Johnson-Hanbury; Liam O'Kelly; Father Brosnan; Police Constable; Judge; Dr. Winbourne; Professor Cuppley
- Subject: The Troubles, Bloody Sunday
- Setting: Guildhall, Derry in Northern Ireland, 1970

Premiere
- Date: 23 February 1973
- Place: Abbey Theatre, Dublin

The Freedom of the City is a 1973 play written by Irish playwright Brian Friel. The play is set in Derry, Northern Ireland in 1970 during the Troubles, and follows three civil rights protestors who mistakenly find themselves in the Mayor of Derry's parlour in the Guildhall after attending a Northern Ireland Civil Rights Association march. Their presence in the Guildhall is mistakenly interpreted as an occupation, and the play depicts the protestor's final hours in the Guildhall, a failed escape attempt which leads to their killing at the hands of the British security forces and the resulting tribunal into their deaths. Friel had originally intended on writing a play set in Derry after moving to the city in 1968, and changed its contents after being present at the Bloody Sunday massacre in January 1972.

== Performance and publication ==
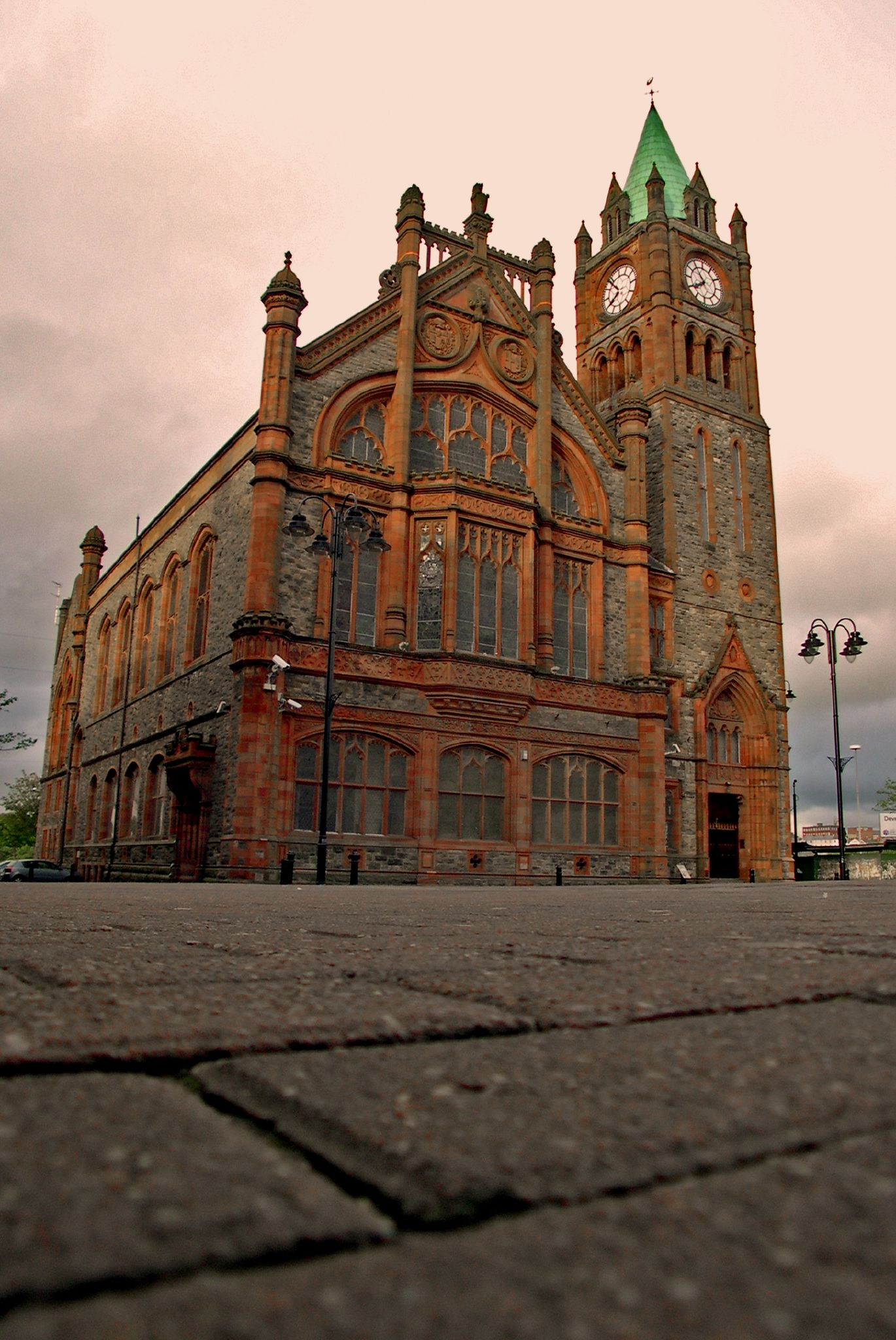
Derry's Guildhall: The mayor's parlour in Guildhall is where the main characters unexpectedly find themselves.

The Freedom of the City was first performed at the Abbey Theatre, Dublin in Ireland, in 1973. In Australia, it remains a popular set text among English, English Literature, Drama and Theatre Studies secondary school students.

== Plot ==
In Derry, Northern Ireland in 1970, the play interweaves the present (a tribunal into the deaths of three civil rights protestors at the hands of the British security forces and the reaction of the city's populace to the killings) and the past (the final hours of the three protestors who have mistakenly found themselves in the Mayor of Derry's parlour in the Guildhall after attending a Northern Ireland Civil Rights Association march). The protestors, who stumbled into the parlour after the march was targeted with tear gas by the security forces, discuss their personal stories as they attempt to wait out the violence in order to go home.

They are gradually revealed as Lily, a 43-year-old mother of eleven, Michael, a 22-year-old unemployed man, and "Skinner", a 21-year-old jobless man who signs himself as 'Freeman of the City' in the Guildhall's guestbook. Their presence in the building is mistakenly interpreted as an occupation, and the three eventually attempt to escape from the Guildhall, but are shot and killed by three soldiers after surrendering. The tribunal concludes with the judge finding the soldiers innocent of any criminal charges, based on fictional eyewitness accounts which stated that Lily and Michael were armed.

== First performance ==
The Freedom of the City was first performed in Dublin at the Abbey Theatre on 20 February 1973.

=== Cast ===
- Ronnie Walsh as the Priest
- Niall O'Brien, Dermot Crowley and Colm Meaney as the three Soldiers
- John Kavanagh as the Judge
- Geoffery Golden as the Police Constable
- Pat Laffan as Dr. Dodds
- Raymond Hardie as Michael
- Angela Newman as Lily
- Eamon Morrissey as Skinner
- Michael O'hAonghusa as Balladeer
- Clive Geraghty as Brigadier Johnson-Hansbury
- Emmet Bergin as the Army Press Officer
- Edward Golden as Dr Winbourne (Forensic Expert)
- Derek Young as Professor Cuppley (Pathologist)
- Bob Carlile as the RTÉ Commentator
- Dinny O'Brien as the Accordionist

== Context ==
- The events entail links to the events of Bloody Sunday, and The Troubles in Northern Ireland.
- Freedom of the City is an honour bestowed by many municipalities, including Irish ones, to esteemed members or organisations of the community for heroic community service (among other possible reasons); the term applies to two separate honours, one civilian and one military. Friel adopts a word play to presumably represent the characters of the play and the protesters who took part in the Bloody Sunday march.

It is a semi-inherited honour which the descendants of former Freemen of the City can receive. During the 17th and 18th century in Derry, the Freemen were part of the ruling body of the city council. Skinner signs himself in as "Freeman of the City" and with a surname of Fitzgerald. In the report of the funeral procession his coffin is carried by the (Roman Catholic order) the Knights of Malta.
