= Translations (play) =

Play written by Brian Friel

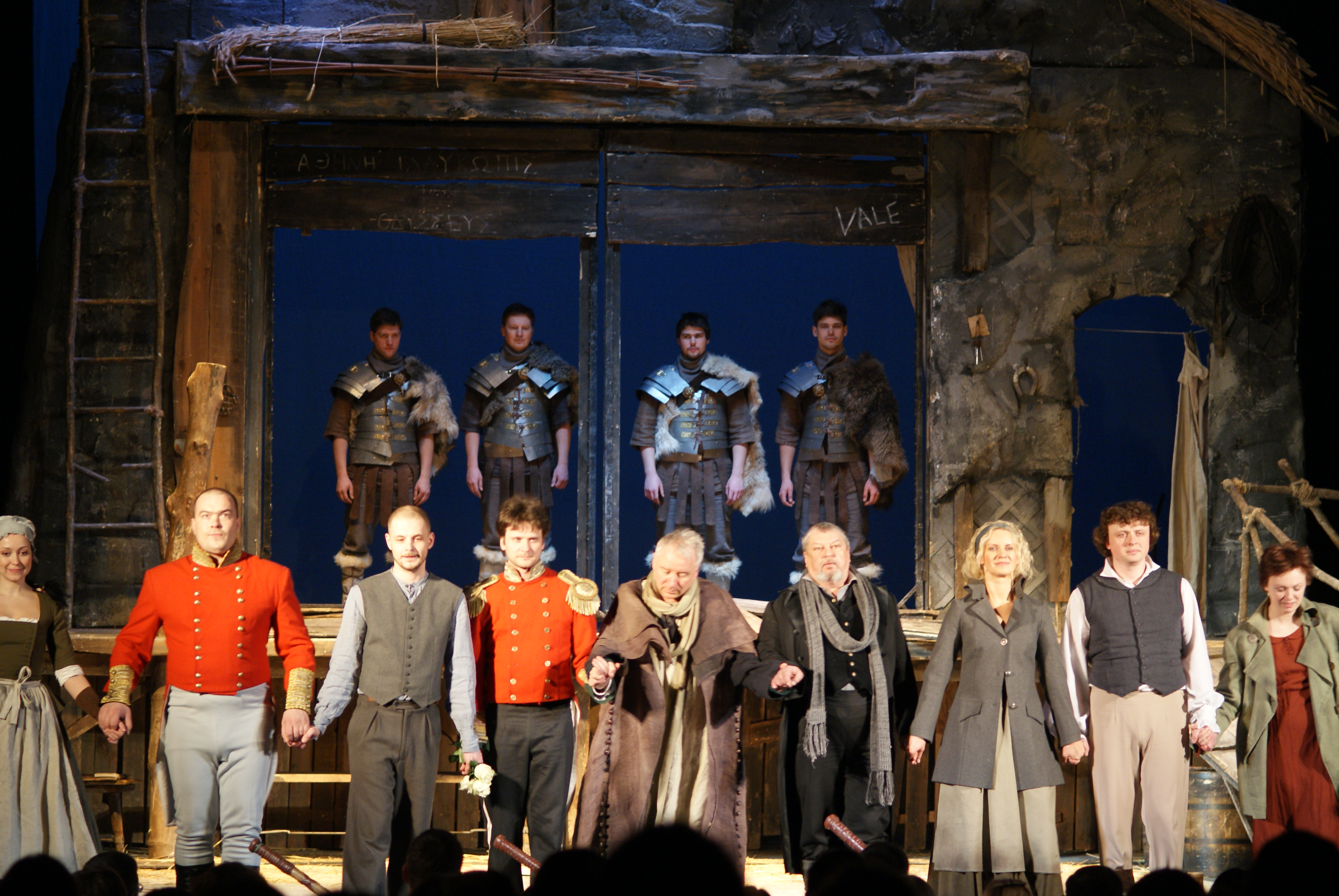
- Translations on stage in Minsk
- Original language: English^{[a]}
- Written by: Brian Friel
- Characters: Manus; Sarah; Jimmy Jack; Maire; Doalty; Bridget; Hugh; Owen; Captain Lancey; Lieutenant Yolland
- Subject: Language, colonialism
- Genre: tragicomedy
- Setting: County Donegal, late August 1833

Premiere
- Date: 23 September 1980
- Place: Guildhall, Derry, Northern Ireland

Translations is a three-act play by Irish playwright Brian Friel, written in 1980. It is set in Baile Beag (Ballybeg), a County Donegal village in 19th-century Ireland. Friel has said that Translations is "a play about language and only about language", but it deals with a wide range of issues, stretching from language and communication to Irish history and cultural imperialism. Friel said that his play "should have been written in Irish" but, despite this fact, he carefully crafted the verbal action in English, bringing the political questions of the play into focus. Baile Beag ("Small Town") is a fictional village, created by Friel as a setting for several of his plays, although there are many real places called Ballybeg throughout Ireland.

== Performance and publication ==
Translations was first performed at the Guildhall, Derry, Northern Ireland, on Tuesday, 23 September 1980. It was the first production by the Field Day Theatre Company founded by Friel and Stephen Rea. It was directed by Art Ó Briain and featured the following cast:

- Mick Lally (Manus)
- Ann Hasson (Sarah)
- Roy Hanlon (Jimmy Jack)
- Nuala Hayes (Máire)
- Liam Neeson (Doalty)
- Brenda Scallon (Bridget)
- Ray McAnally (Hugh)
- Stephen Rea (Owen)
- David Heap (Captain Lancey)
- Shaun Scott (Lieutenant Yolland)

The staging in Derry was significant for a number reasons. Friel and Stephen Rea thought of Derry as a clean slate where they could have more creative control over their work. Rea also thought that the play had a much profounder impact being staged in Derry than if it had been staged in Dublin. Art Ó Briain also pushed for a Derry staging. Furthermore, Guildhall's proximity to the play's County Donegal setting and the strong Northern accents of the mostly Ulster cast created a strong sense of "local pride" and "community passion". Derry itself was also the subject of a name dispute, fitting for a play "concerned with place names".

The play opened in London at the Hampstead Theatre in May 1981, before transferring to the Lyttelton stage at the National Theatre in August of that year.

Translations received its American premiere at Cleveland Play House in 1981, starring Richard Halverson as Hugh. The production was directed by Kenneth Albers with scene and lighting design by Richard Gould. The play was staged in New York City later that year by the Manhattan Theatre Club, starring Barnard Hughes. It was briefly revived on Broadway in 1995 in a production starring Brian Dennehy. In 2006–2007, the Manhattan Theatre Club returned it to the stage at the McCarter Theatre in Princeton, New Jersey and the Biltmore Theatre in New York, directed by Garry Hynes.

The play was published in 1981 by Faber and Faber, who still publish it today. It is published in the United States and performance rights are held by Samuel French Inc. It is a set text on the Leaving Certificate English curriculum in Ireland and, in the United Kingdom, it remains a popular set text among English and Drama & Theatre A-Level students. It won the Christopher Ewart-Biggs Memorial Prize for 1985.

An Irish-language version of the play has been produced. The play has also been translated into Welsh by Elan Closs Stephens. The Welsh version has visited a number of venues in Wales and was first published by Gwasg Carreg Gwalch, under its Welsh title Torri Gair ("Breaking the Word"), in 1982.

The play was staged in 2003 in Greece by "Aplo Theatre" directed by Antonis Antypas. One of the last performances was attended by the author himself. According to Kathimerini newspaper, the photos of the Athenian performance that arrived at his home in Donegal made him decide to make the not easy journey. The physiognomies of the actors played a decisive role.

Translations was adapted for Belarus in 2009 by Mykalai Pinygin at Janka Kupala Theater. Irish characters speak Belarusian in the play, and the English speak Russian, which draws parallels with the period of russification of Belarus by Imperial Russia in 19th-20th century.

Translations was adapted as a radio play directed by Kirsty Williams, broadcast on BBC Radio 4, on 4 September 2010 (see Translations (radio play)).

Translations was adapted for a Catalan audience in February, 2014 by Ferran Utzet, and performed at the Biblioteca de Catalunya (Library of Catalonia) in Barcelona. It was produced by Perla 29.

In 2017 Translations was directed by Bill Kerr at University of Manitoba’s Black Hole Theatre Company.

Translations was performed at the Olivier Theatre from 22 May to 11 August 2018, starring Colin Morgan as Owen and Ciarán Hinds as his father. It was directed by Ian Rickson.

In 2022 Translations was translated into te reo Māori by Hēmi Kelly, a full-time lecturer in te reo Māori at the Auckland University of Technology. It was commissioned by the Embassy of Ireland in Aotearoa New Zealand and is the first major Irish literary work available in the language.

Translations premiered in Ukraine amidst the Russian invasion of 2022. Kyrylo Kashlikov directed it at Lesya Ukrainka Theater and in 2023 the play toured in Dublin's Abbey Theater in Ukrainian with English subtitles.

In 2025, the play was staged in Senegal in French.

In 2026, the play was staged in Cyprus in a bilingual production co-translated by Patrick Myles and Andreas Tselepos and directed by Myles, with Greek Cypriot replacing the original Gaelic.

=== Inspirations and influences ===
Five years prior to writing Translations, Friel mentioned a number of topics going through his mind: a play set sometime between the Act of Union and the Great Famine in the 19th century; a play about Daniel O'Connell and the Catholic Emancipation; a play about colonialism; and a play about the death of the Irish language, the acquisition of English and its profound effects. During this time, Friel had made a couple of accidental discoveries: that his great-great-grandfather was a hedge-schoolmaster, leading Friel to read about hedge-schools in Ireland; and that the first trigonometrical base set up by the Ordnance Survey in 1828 was next to his residence in Muff, leading him to read about the man in charge of the survey, Colonel Thomas Frederick Colby, who would later serve as inspiration for one of Translation's characters, Captain Lancey. Friel then discovered A Paper Landscape in 1976, which synthesized everything he had been thinking about into the perfect metaphor, map-making, serving as the foundation for his work.

A Paper Landscape was written by John Harwood Andrews and first published in 1975 by Oxford University Press. It examines the Ordnance Survey's map-making operation in Ireland which began in 1824, with the first maps appearing between 1835 and 1846, and production continuing until almost the end of the century.

"Friel's reading of George Steiner's After Babel was absolutely essential to the creation of Translations."

== Characters ==
- Manus – a scholar who is his late twenties/thirties who is one of Hugh's sons and lame. Hugh treats Manus badly, never paying him, acknowledging his hard work and treating him like a 'footman', despite this Manus respects and refuses to go against his father. He speaks only Irish in front of the British, even though he knows how to speak English. He tries to teach Sarah how to speak. Manus has difficulty walking due to an injury sustained from his father when he was a baby.
- Sarah – she has had a speech defect all her life, leading many in the town to consider her dumb.
- Jimmy Jack Cassie – the "infant prodigy" is a bachelor in his sixties, who never washes or changes his clothes. Despite being fluent in both Latin and Greek, he still enjoys attending the hedge-school. He is obsessed with the Greek Goddess Athena, and the line between reality and fiction blurs for him throughout the play.
- Máire – a strong woman in her twenties, she wants to learn English so that she can emigrate to America.
- Doalty – a young man described as 'generous and slightly thick' with his idiocy mocked by characters such as Hugh. However, Doalty is implied to be smarter than he seems, and is involved in the Irish resistance with connections to the Donnelly Twins. He studies at the local hedge-school.
- Bridget – a young girl with "a countrywoman's instinctive cunning". She has a close, implied romantic, relationship with Doalty. She studies at the local hedge-school.
- Hugh – a large man in his late sixties, perpetually drunk. He is hedge-master at Baile Beag's hedge-school, often quizzing his students on the origins of words.
- Owen – a well dressed, handsome young man in his twenties, who is also one of Hugh's sons. He is employed part-time by the British to provide English translations of place names in Ireland. The British mistakenly call him Roland.
- Captain Lancey – a middle-aged officer, competent at cartography but lacking in social skills.
- Lieutenant George Yolland – in his late twenties/early thirties, with a tall awkward appearance. He is in Ireland by chance. Having missed his boat to India, he subsequently enlisted in the Army, was assigned to the Engineers, then posted to Dublin, and finally sent to Baile Beag with the Ordnance Survey. He often proclaims his admiration for the Irish culture and language despite being unable to speak it. He falls in love with Maire.
- Donnelly Twins – they are referred to several times throughout the play, but are never shown on-stage.

== Plot ==
The play is set in the quiet community of Baile Beag (later anglicised to Ballybeg), in County Donegal, in 1833. Many of the inhabitants have little experience of the world outside the village. In spite of this, tales about Greek goddesses are as commonplace as those about the potato crops, and, in addition to Irish, Latin and Greek are spoken in the local hedge school. Friel uses language as a tool to highlight the problems of communication — lingual, cultural, and generational. Both Irish and English characters in the play "speak" their respective languages, but in actuality it is English that is mostly spoken by the actors. This allows the audience to understand all the languages, as if a translator was provided. However, onstage, the characters cannot comprehend each other. This is due to lack of compromise from both parties, the English and Irish, to learn the others' language, a metaphor for the wider barrier that is between the two parties.

=== Act 1 ===
The play opens with a Hedge School in Baile Beag. It is supposedly run by the alcoholic schoolmaster Hugh, although his lame aspiring teacher son Manus does most of the work, and is mistreated by his father despite this. Manus helps Sarah, who the village consider dumb due to her speech impediment, and is oblivious to her feelings for him. Students begin to arrive including Manus' partner, Máire, who is currently upset with Manus due to his inability to stand up to Hugh and plans to learn English and leave for America. One student, Doalty, has stolen a measuring pole from the English army, which Manus respects and Máire criticizes.

The action begins when Owen (mistakenly pronounced as Roland by his English friend), the younger (and favorite) son of Hugh who consequently has a strained relationship with Manus, returning home after six years away in Dublin. With him are Captain Lancey, a middle-aged, pragmatic cartographer, and Lieutenant Yolland, a young, idealistic and romantic orthographer, both working on the six-inch-to-the-mile map survey of Ireland for the Ordnance Survey. Owen acts as a translator and go-between for the British and Irish, as only he, Manus, and Hugh speak both languages. The characters all have differing opinions on Owen's indifference to the anglicising program he is helping Lancey and Yolland with.

=== Act 2 ===
Yolland and Owen work to translate local placenames into English for purposes of the map: Druim Dubh, which means "black shoulder" in Irish, becomes Dromduff in English, and Poll na gCaorach, meaning "hole of the sheep" in Irish, becomes Poolkerry. While Owen has no qualms about anglicising the names of places that form part of his heritage, Yolland, who has fallen in love with Ireland, is unhappy with what he perceives as a destruction of Irish culture and language. Manus and Hugh, who both separately interrupt the pair, also have differing opinions; Manus dislikes Yolland who he views as ignorant about Irish culture, whereas Hugh makes himself seem pompous in attempts to impress the English soldier. Soon after Hugh leaves, Owen becomes angry with Yolland's consistent mispronunciations and calling him 'Roland' causing him to correct him for the first time.

Manus successfully applies for a teaching job on the island of Inis Meadhon, and assumes Máire will join him. Máire, meanwhile, begins a friendly correspondence with Yolland despite that fact he only speaks English and she only speaks Irish. Although initially Owen translates for them, they later meet and leave a party together, where they manage to communicate without a translator. Sarah witnesses the pair kiss, and flees to tell Manus.

=== Act 3 ===
The following day, Manus prepares to flee Baile Beag to Inis Meadhon against Owen's desperate advice. It is revealed that Yolland has gone missing overnight after a confrontation with Manus (it is hinted that he has been attacked, or worse, by the elusive armed resistance in the form of the Donnelly twins), and Owen believes Lancey and the men will blame Manus. Despite this, a distraught Manus leaves, and it is suggested that he will be killed as he is lame and thus will be caught by the soldiers.

The students arrive, bringing stories of the masses of English soldiers searching for Yolland and those responsible for his disappearance. Máire is in denial about Yolland's disappearance and remains convinced that he will return unharmed. Captain Lancey arrives at the school, threatening first to shoot all livestock if Yolland is not found within twenty-four hours, then evict the villagers and destroy their homes if he is not found within forty-eight hours. Doalty momentarily drops his façade to tell Owen that Yolland will not return and invite him to join the Irish resistance. A conflicted Owen remains at the school and debates with his drunken father before suddenly realizing what he should do and leaves to join Doalty. The play ends ambiguously, with Hugh drunkenly reciting the opening of Virgil's Aeneid, which tells of the inevitability of conquest but also of its impermanence.

Friel's play tells of the struggle between England and Ireland during this turbulent time. The play focuses mainly on (mis)communication and language to tell of the desperate situation between these two countries with an unsure and questionable outcome.

== Themes ==
=== Politics ===
Translations as a play focuses primarily on language issues through the lens of 19th century rural Ireland. However through the choice of setting, Friel reveals his attempt to maintain an ideological distance from the ongoing Northern Irish Troubles and the era's extremely divisive political climate. As Friel said of the process of dislocating Translations from the political context of the late 70's and early 80's, "I know of no Irish writer who is not passionately engaged in our current problems. But he must maintain perspective as a writer, and - equally important - he will write about the situation in terms that may not relate even remotely to the squalor of Here and Now."

Friel saw Translations, in his own words as, "...Stepping stones to the other side." In light of these quotations, Translations emerges as an attempt by Friel to reconcile the divided state of Northern Ireland. This goal was the explicit driving force behind the first production of Translations. Translations premiered on 23 September 1980, in Derry's Guildhall, a symbol of Unionism in the politically divided city, the staging of the play there being an overt political message of reconciliation attempted by Friel.

Within Translations, the relationship between the British officer Yolland and Máire the native Irish speaker, points to the binary of political belief in Northern Ireland between Unionists and Republicans. The couple, who cannot speak one another's language, nevertheless fall in love, a potent message of reconciliation and co-existence to the politically divided communities of Northern Ireland. Friel marked Translations as trying to, "...find some kind of generosity that can embrace the whole island."

=== Post-Colonialism ===
The engagement of postcolonial scholars with Translations arises primarily through an examination of the language issues of 19th century Ireland. As Friel himself has emphasised, Translations is about "language and only language." However, the Irish language has often been interpreted not only as a mean of communication, but also as "a tool for resistance and a marker of identity". Language affects many aspects of one's life, and Translations shows "the power of language to give definition not only to thought, but also to history, ethnic identity and national aspiration".

Friel's often quoted denial of the other themes in Translations, is directly at odds with other statements, "Of course, it's also concerned with the English presence here. No matter how benign they may think it has been, finally the presence of any foreigner in your land is malign."

It has been suggested that Friel's creation of Translations was inspired by two projects during the period of British rule in Ireland. Firstly, the abolition of independent 'hedgerow' schools which taught subjects in the Irish language, replaced with English-language schools. The imposition of the new national school was, in part, an attempt by the Dublin Castle administration to replace Irish by English as the sole medium of instruction. This change of the educational system, similar to the translation of the place names on the map, has been called the "rape of a country's linguistic and cultural heritage". As the Irish scholar Declan Kiberd remarks, "one of the first policies formulated by the Norman occupiers was to erase Gaelic culture". This historical context serves to demonstrate that the "language of any country is seen as a matter of identity, independence and 'sovereignty'". Secondly, the Ordnance Survey which sought to create standardisations of Irish maps, primarily through the Anglicisation of Irish place-names. Postcolonial scholar Shaun Richards argues that Friel uses these two historical events as the framing for his discussion of colonialism within Translations. As Frantz Fanon said, colonialism, "...turns to the past of the oppressed people, and distorts, disfigures and destroys it." In this sense, Friel highlights the destructive nature of the colonial projects depicted in Translations, literally 'distorting' the landscape of Ireland by the Anglicisation of place-names and replacing the use of native language with a foreign one.

The colonial projects depicted in Translations are used by Friel to discuss post-colonial tensions in modern Northern Ireland. Edward Said saw Translations as firmly within the post-colonial discourse, "Brian Friel’s immensely resonant play Translations...immediately calls forth many echoes and parallels in an Indian, Algerian, or Palestinian reader...the silencing of their voices, the renaming of places and replacement of languages by the imperial outsider, the creation of colonial maps and divisions also implied the attempted reshaping of societies, the imposition of foreign languages and other forms of dispossession."

=== Language, identity and culture ===
a. For much of the play, it is understood that characters are speaking Irish, and the English characters cannot understand them. There are also several passages of Latin and Ancient Greek.

Though Translations is written almost completely in English (with odd lines of Greek and Latin), Friel intended that the "English onstage represents two separate languages – the Irish we are asked to imagine and the English which is now the 'natural vehicle' for a play on an Irish stage". "Linguistic and cognitive distance" are shown between characters from the different linguistic parties: the Irish and English characters have been given different voices even though their speech is written in the same language. Friel's dramatic conceit allows the audience access to either side of the language barrier, making the misunderstandings and miscommunications between Yolland and Maire in the love scene evident.

The "idioms and rhythms of Irish speech" are depicted through Doalty, Bridget and Jimmy Jack Cassie's speeches, in contrast with Lancey, who speaks in the "clipped, efficient tones of the King's English", to emphasise the other central theme of "colonialism". The idea of a 'doubleness' in response to the Irish-English language conflict is also represented in the play. Considered as "a mid-solution of the Old Gaelic tongue and the modern 'dominant' English", 'doubleness' would require Ireland "either to use an Irish version of English, which includes Gaelic expression, or to be a bi-lingual nation in which both Irish and English are acceptable". W. B. Spring Worthen has argued that in Translations, Friel presents the Irish English to its audience by "trouble[ing] the 'English' surfaces of the play, using Irish English in ways that keep its language 'other' to audiences whose English isn't Irish".

== Criticism and interpretations ==
Translations received a wide range of interpretations and reactions since its Derry staging. In spite of the irony of it being played in the Guildhall, "a symbol of Unionist power", the Sinn Féin weekly An Phoblacht wrote that "Translations deals powerfully with a number of themes of particular interest to Republicans", and yet the unionist Lord Mayor of Derry led a standing ovation on opening night.

Sean Connolly criticised the historical liberties taken in Translations, writing that Friel "presents a grossly oversimplified view of the forces behind the abandonment of Irish."

The philosopher Richard Kearney argued that Translations presented language not as a naming system, but as a way to find new relationships between the "sundered cultural identities of the island".

=== Historical inaccuracies ===
John H. Andrews challenged many of Friel's representations of the Ordnance Survey, concerned that they be taken as historically plausible or true. For example, anglicised place names were already being used throughout Ireland, so it is "dangerously ambiguous to describe what the Survey did as 'naming'." Many of the names on the new maps were already widely being used in Ireland, and that there were no laws or obligations to use any of the Ordnance Survey names. As well, the soldiers going on survey duty were presented in the play as "prodding every inch of ground with their bayonets", even though they historically would not have had bayonets. When Yolland, one of the Ordnance Survey officers, disappeared, Lancey threatened to retaliate by shooting live-stock and evicting people when in actuality, the soldiers would have left issues of crime and civil disturbance to the local constabulary. There were also inconsistencies in some of the dates. For example, Donegal had already been renamed by the time of the play in 1833, but was actually renamed in 1835, and the actual Yolland that Lieutenant Yolland is based on did not join the survey department until 1838.

Kevin Barry organized a debate in 1983 between Friel and Andrews, where Friel admits to "tiny bruises inflicted on history in the play". Kevin Barry forgave the historical liberties that Translations makes, writing that it revealed the 'hidden Ireland', making use of the 'unreality of fiction in order to imagine answers' to questions that even the English mapmakers had about the Irish people. Even though it is a work of fictional drama, this aspect of it makes the work complementary to A Paper Landscape, which privileged the records of those who had the authority to write, while excluding those who were defeated.

=== Owen ===
Owen is "by far the most complex character onstage", embodying 'all the conflicts and tensions in the play'. Owen arrives as an interpreter for the English in the Irish village, establishing himself as a pivotal cog in the social fabric of Baile Beag. He is comfortable being called interchangeably as Owen by the locals and Roland by the British, yet denies his heritage - "my job is to translate the quaint, archaic tongue you people persist in speaking into the King's good English". While claiming to be the "same me"; he is not - he is one part Irish and one part British, and acts as a crucial go-between, a role which he also denies, leading him to be less concerned with the social repercussions of his work. In the play, he is responsible for bringing together Maire and Yolland, but refuses to take responsibility for the effects of his actions; without Owen to fill the gap at the center, the union is doomed - just like Baile Beag and the English force. Owen's role in the destruction of Baile Beag is alluded to by Hugh's drunken recitation of the Aeneid near the end of the play. The lines refer to Carthage, the legendary North African settlement of Dido, and, in history, the notorious thorn in ancient Rome's side that was finally sacked and conquered in the Third Punic War - by analogy the Romans are the British and the Carthaginians the Irish.

== Historical references ==
- The Englishmen in the play are a detachment of the Royal Engineers and function as part of the Ordnance Survey creating six inch maps of Ireland. The characters of Captain Lancey and Lieutenant Yolland are fictionalised representations of two real soldiers who took part in the survey: Thomas Frederick Colby and William Yolland, but Thomas Larcom has also been identified as a possible model for the lieutenant, with Owen based on his teacher, the Irish linguist John O'Donovan.
- The character Máire contemplates emigration to America, reflecting the mass emigration of Irish people to America in the 19th century. The theme of emigration is key throughout the whole play, as Manus plans to leave after being offered a job in another hedge school.
- There are fearful references to potato blight, anticipating the Great Famine of 1845–49 (the play is set in 1833).
- Irish politician and nationalist hero Daniel O'Connell is mentioned and quoted as saying that Irish people should learn English and that the Irish language was a barrier to modern progress.
- Anglicisation of place names, including Baile Beag (the setting), is prominent in the dialogue, because it is Lieutenant Yolland's professional assignment.
- A national school is to open in the town, replacing the existing hedge school.
- Characters Hugh and Jimmy remember how they marched to battle during the Irish Rebellion of 1798, only to march back home upon feeling homesick.
- The play's focus on the Anglicization of names of the Irish towns and cities is based on the Ordnance Survey during 1824–46, which was intended for more efficient work in tax regulations and military planning.

== Awards and nominations ==
=== Original Broadway production ===
Year	Award	Category	Nominee	Result
1995	Theatre World Award		Rufus Sewell	Won

=== 2007 Broadway revival ===
Year	Award	Category	Nominee	Result
2007	Tony Award	Best Revival of a Play		Nominated
