= The Home Place =

The Home Place is a play written by Brian Friel that first premiered at the Gate Theatre, Dublin on 1 February 2005. After a sold-out season at the Gate, it transferred to the Comedy Theatre (now Harold Pinter Theatre), in London's West End, on 25 May 2005, where it won the 2005 Evening Standard Award for Best Play, and made its American premiere at the Guthrie Theater (Minneapolis, MN) in September 2007.

== Summary ==
The play is set in the summer of 1878 in the fictional village of Ballybeg, County Donegal, at the house ("The Lodge") of Christopher Gore, who lives with his son David, and their longtime housekeeper Margaret. Christopher is a widowed land-owner from England ("the home place" of Kent). Both he and his son David are in love with Margaret. Two guests are staying at The Lodge, Dr Richard Gore, Christopher's cousin, and Dr Gore's assistant, Perkins. Dr Gore is an anthropologist and is traveling throughout Ireland recording the physical characteristics of the locals.

Dr Gore's methods and racist hypotheses ignite animosity in the town, where a despised English landlord, Lord Lifford, was recently murdered. Christopher is caught in the middle between his cousin and his allegiance to the locals. The play runs the course of a single day in Ballybeg and centers on the resurgence of the Home rule movement in Ireland. The Lifford killing is based on the actual murder of the 3rd Earl of Leitrim in April 1878.

== Characters ==
- Christopher Gore - Owner of The Lodge and a landlord in Ballybeg.
- David Gore - Son of Christopher.
- Dr. Richard Gore - Cousin of Christopher Gore, Anthropologist.
- Perkins - Assistant to Dr Gore.
- Lord Lifford - Local landlord, recently killed.
- Margaret O'Donnell - Head housekeeper at The Lodge.
- Clement O'Donnell - Father of Margaret, local schoolmaster and choir leader.
- Sally Cavanagh - housekeeper at The Lodge
- Con Doherty - local voice/leader of disapproval of Dr Gore's work
- Johnny MacLoone - local, strongman for Con
- Tommy Boyle - young local
- Maisie McLaughlin - young local
- Mary Sweeney - local

== Original Cast ==
When the show first premiered, the original cast was:

- Christopher Gore - Sir Tom Courtenay
- David Gore - Hugh O'Conor
- Dr. Richard Gore - Nick Dunning
- Perkins - Pat Kinevane
- Margaret O'Donnell - Derbhle Crotty
- Clement O'Donnell - Barry McGovern
- Sally Cavanagh - Laura Jane Laughlin
- Con Doherty - Adam Fergus
- Johnny MacLoone - Michael Judd
- Tommy Boyle - Bill Ó Cléirigh / Kenneth McDonnell (alternated shows)
- Maisie McLaughlin - Leanna Duke / Ciara Lyons
- Mary Sweeney - Brenda Larby
