= Bríd Brennan =

Irish actress

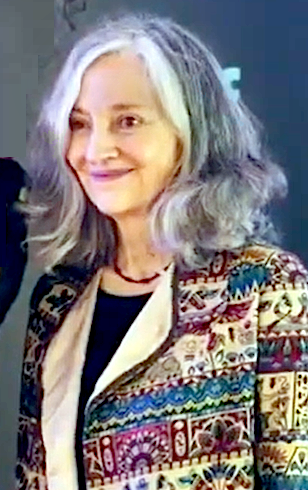
- Brennan at Dublin International Film Festival 2025
- Born: 1955 (age 70–71); Belfast, Northern Ireland
- Occupation: Actress
- Years active: 1980–present

Bríd Brennan (born 1955) is an Irish actress who is known for her film, television and theatre work. She originated the role of Agnes in the Brian Friel play Dancing at Lughnasa, for which she won the 1992 Tony Award for Best Featured Actress in a Play. She is also a three-time Olivier Award nominee, for Rutherford and Son (1995), The Little Foxes (2002) and The Ferryman (2018).

Along with her roles in the films Maeve (1981), Anne Devlin (1984) and Mike Leigh's Four Days in July (1985), Brennan reprised her role of Agnes in the 1998 film version of Dancing at Lughnasa, starring alongside Meryl Streep. Her television credits include Cracker: Brotherly Love (1995), South Riding (2011) and The Escape Artist (2013).

== Life and career ==
=== Early years ===
Beginning her acting career in Dublin, Brennan appeared in many of the major theatres including the Gate Theatre, the Abbey Theatre and the Gaiety Theatre, as well as touring community centres with Moving Theatre.

=== Theatre ===
Brennan created the role of Agnes Mundy in Brian Friel's play Dancing at Lughnasa (1990). She played the role in the original Dublin, West End and Broadway (1992–1992) productions, winning the 1992 Tony Award for Best Featured Actress in a Play.

Brennan portrayed the character Janet in the National Theatre's 1994 production of Rutherford and Son and was subsequently nominated for an Olivier Award the following year. She then went on to play the lead role of Lady Macbeth in the Royal Shakespeare Company's national tour of Macbeth in 1996–1997.

In 1999, Brennan played Maisie Madigan in Pearson's production of Juno and the Paycock at the Gaiety Theatre, Dublin, alongside Michael Gambon whom she had previously appeared with in the 1998 film adaptation of Dancing at Lughnasa. In 2002, Brennan was again nominated for an Olivier award for her performance in the Donmar Warehouse's 2001 production of The Little Foxes. In 2006, she starred as Sister Aloysius in a production of Doubt at the Abbey Theatre in Dublin.

In March 2014, it was announced that she had been cast in the role of Kate Keller in Arthur Miller's All My Sons, playing at the Open Air Theatre, Regent's Park in May/June 2014, performing alongside Tom Mannion and Charles Aitken, the latter of whom she had previously performed with in The Old Vic's 2013 production of Sweet Bird of Youth.

In April 2017, she appeared in The Ferryman at the Royal Court Theatre, ahead of a transfer to the Gielgud Theatre in the West End.

In 2023, she originated the role of Mary in Dixon and Daughters at the National Theatre, which was captured for National Theatre Live.

=== Radio, television and film ===
Brennan acted in the much acclaimed Billy trilogy of plays for the BBC Play for Today series (1982–1984) with fellow Belfast natives Sir Kenneth Branagh and James Ellis. In 1984, Brennan played Collette, one of the main characters in Mike Leigh's television film Four Days in July, based on the Troubles in Northern Ireland.

On 31 October 1992, Brennan starred in BBC1's Screen One Hallowe'en drama Ghostwatch alongside Michael Parkinson, Sarah Greene, Mike Smith and Craig Charles. This ghost story, written by Stephen Volk, was produced in the style of a live television broadcast from an allegedly haunted house in North London. Brennan appeared as the mother of the house, Pamela Early, who, alongside her two young daughters, was experiencing paranormal events in their house. The drama caused uproar in the UK, with many feeling it was a deliberate hoax, designed to let viewers think it was a real live show and not a drama. However, it did make Brennan become well known, as 11 million people watched it.

Brennan featured as a guest star in the British television series Cracker in 1995 as a prostitute-hating killer in the episode "Brotherly Love". Coincidentally, she co-starred in this particular episode with fellow Irish actor Lorcan Cranitch, with whom she would later co-star in Dancing at Lughnasa.

She reprised her performance of Agnes on screen in Noel Pearson's film adaptation of Dancing at Lughnasa (1998), starring Meryl Streep, for which Brennan won an Irish Film & Television Award for Best Actress.

In 2010, Brennan appeared in the television shows Doctor Who and The Escape Artist, both alongside David Tennant.

Brennan gave an award-winning performance in 2012's Shadow Dancer, winning an IFTA for her role as Ma. According to the director James Marsh, the fact that she had grown up in West Belfast during the Troubles was significant as by casting Irish actors "it felt that they knew this world better than I did and I felt they could help me and guide me".

For RTÉ Radio 1, Brennan played the role of Lucia Joyce in Thomas Kilroy's In the Garden of the Asylum in 2009.

In 2021, she appeared in the Irish-language crime thriller Doineann, along with Peter Coonan.

== Acting credits ==
=== Theatre ===
| Year | Title | Role | Notes |
|---|---|---|---|
| 1980 | The Winter's Tale | Dorcas | Abbey Theatre |
| 1990–1992 | Dancing at Lughnasa | Agnes | Abbey Theatre; National Theatre; Plymouth Theatre |
| 1994 | Rutherford and Son | Janet | National Theatre |
| 1996–1997 | Macbeth | Lady Macbeth | Royal Shakespeare Company |
| 1999 | Juno and the Paycock | Maisie Madigan | Gaiety Theatre |
| 2000–2001 | La Lupa | Pina | Royal Shakespeare Company |
| 2001 | The Little Foxes | Birdie Hubbard | Donmar Warehouse |
| 2003 | Absolutely! (Perhaps) | Cini | Wyndham's Theatre |
| 2004 | The Dark | Janet | Donmar Warehouse |
| 2004 | Bone | Helen | Royal Court Theatre |
| 2004–2005 | By the Bog of Cats | Catwoman | Wyndham's Theatre |
| 2005 | The Cosmonaut's Last Message to the Woman He Once Loved in the Former Soviet Union | Vivienne/Sylvia | Donmar Warehouse |
| 2005 | The Playboy of the Western World | Margaret Flaherty (Pegeen Mike) | Druid Theatre Company of Galway |
| 2005 | Pillars of the Community | Marta Bernick | National Theatre |
| 2006 | Woman and Scarecrow | Scarecrow | Royal Court Theatre |
| 2006 | Doubt | Sister Aloysius Beauvier | Abbey Theatre |
| 2007 | Intemperance | Millie | Everyman Theatre Liverpool |
| 2008 | Brendan at the Chelsea | Beatrice | Riverside Studios |
| 2008 | Bliss | Wal-Mart Employee | Royal Court Theatre |
| 2008 | Dallas Sweetman | Mrs Reddan | Canterbury Cathedral |
| 2010 | Philadelphia, Here I Come! | Madge | Gaiety Theatre, Dublin |
| 2011 | The Veil | Mrs Goulding | National Theatre |
| 2012 | Henry V | Chorus/Queen Isabel | Shakespeare's Globe |
| 2013 | Desolate Heaven | Freda/Laoise/Bridie | Theatre503 |
| 2013 | Sweet Bird of Youth | Aunt Nonnie | The Old Vic |
| 2013 | A Particle of Dread (Oedipus Variations) | Jocasta/Jocelyn | Derry Playhouse |
| 2014 | All My Sons | Kate Keller | Open Air Theatre, Regent's Park |
| 2016 | All That Fall | Mrs. Rooney | Wilton's Music Hall |
| 2017 | The Ferryman | Aunt Maggie Far Away | Royal Court Theatre & Gielgud Theatre transfer |
| 2019 | Blood Wedding | La Vecina | The Young Vic |
| 2023 | Dixon and Daughters | Mary | National Theatre; Filmed for National Theatre Live |

=== Film and television ===
| Year | Title | Role | Notes |
|---|---|---|---|
| 1981 | Excalibur | Lady in Waiting | |
| 1981 | Maeve | Roisin | |
| 1982 | The Ballroom of Romance | Patty Byrne | |
| 1982–1984 | The Billy Plays Trilogy on Play for Today | Lorna Martin | Television series 3 episodes opposite Kenneth Branagh. |
| 1984 | Anne Devlin | Anne Devlin | |
| 1985 | Four Days in July | Collette | |
| 1985 | Ursula and Glenys | Ursula | |
| 1987 | Hidden City | The Wife – in B&W film | |
| 1987 | Lorna | Lorna | |
| 1989 | Screen One | Lillian's Nurse | Television series 1 episode |
| 1990 | Who Bombed Birmingham? | Sister of IRA man | |
| 1991 | 4 Play | Susan Turnbull | Television series 1 episode |
| 1992 | Ghostwatch | Pamela Early | |
| 1992 | Tell Tale Hearts | Sally McCann | Television mini-series |
| 1993 | Performance | Thea Elvsted | Television series |
| 1994 | Guinevere | Morgan L'Fei | |
| 1994 | Words Upon the Window Pane | Stella | |
| 1995 | Cracker | Maggie Harvey | Television series 3 episodes |
| 1996 | Trojan Eddie | Betty | |
| 1996 | Saint-Ex | Simone de Saint-Exupéry | |
| 1998 | Dancing at Lughnasa | Agnes Mundy | |
| 1999 | Felicia's Journey | Mrs Lysaght | |
| 1999 | Topsy-Turvy | Mad Woman | |
| 2002 | Sunday | Mrs Young | |
| 2002 | Any Time Now | Emily Moggin | Television series 4 episodes |
| 2004 | The Clinic | Sheila McNamara | Television series 1 episode |
| 2008 | Trial & Retribution | Gemma Webster | Television series 1 episode |
| 2009 | Swansong: Story of Occi Byrne | Theresa Byrne | |
| 2009 | Father & Son | Maternity Clinic Doctor | Television series 1 episode |
| 2010 | Doctor Who | The Visionary | Television series 1 episode |
| 2010 | Little Crackers | Sister Mary Bernadette | Television series 1 episode |
| 2011 | South Riding | Miss Sigglesthwaite | Television miniseries 2 episodes |
| 2012 | Shadow Dancer | Ma | |
| 2012 | Upstairs Downstairs | Miss Poulson | Television Series; 1 episode |
| 2012 | Casualty | Jane Flynn | Television series 1 episode |
| 2013 | The Escape Artist | Mary | Television series 3 episodes |
| 2015 | Brooklyn | "Nettles" Kelly | |
| 2016 | Florence Foster Jenkins | Kitty | |
| 2016–2017 | Peaky Blinders | Audrey Changretta | Television series 2 episodes |
| 2018 | Unforgotten (Series 3) | Suzanne Reid | Television series |
| 2021 | Doineann | Labhaoise | Irish language film |
| 2021–2024 | Hope Street | Concepta O’Hare | Television series; main role |
| 2022 | My Sailor, My Love | Annie | Film |
| 2023 | Room Taken | Victoria | Short film |
| 2025 | Aontas | Cáit | Irish language film |
| 2025 | Trespasses | Older Cushla | Television mini-series 1 episode |
| 2026 | Tender Loving Care | | Film |
| 2026–present | Harry Potter | Madame Poppy Pomfrey | Recurring |

=== Radio ===
| Year | Title | Role | Producer | Station | Notes |
|---|---|---|---|---|---|
| 1994 | Parrots and Owls | Nuala | Jeremy Howe | BBC Radio 3 | play by John Purser |

== Accolades ==
- 1992 – Tony Award for Best Featured Actress in a Play for Dancing at Lughnasa
- 1992 – Drama Desk Award for Ensemble Performance for Dancing at Lughnasa
- 1992 – Theatre World Special Award for Ensemble Performance for Dancing at Lughnasa
- 1995 – Nominated for Olivier Award for Best Actress in a Supporting Role for Rutherford and Son
- 1999 – Irish Film & Television Award for Best Actress for Dancing at Lughnasa
- 2002 – Nominated for Olivier Award for Best Actress in a Supporting Role for The Little Foxes
- 2012 – Edinburgh International Film Festival for Best Performance in a British Feature Film for Shadow Dancer (shared with Andrea Riseborough)
- 2013 – Irish Film & Television Award for Best Supporting Actress Film for Shadow Dancer
- 2018 – Nominated for Olivier Award for Best Actress in a Supporting Role for The Ferryman
- 2024 – Best Actress Award at the Indie Shorts Awards Cannes for Room Taken an Irish short film directed by Tj O'Grady Peyton.

== See also ==
- List of Irish actors
