= Living Quarters =

1977 play by Brian Friel

Living Quarters is a play written by Brian Friel and first performed in the Abbey Theatre in Dublin, Ireland, in 1977 in a production directed by Joe Dowling.

== Dramatis Personae and Original Cast ==
Sir (Clive Geraghty) The artificial narrator of the play.
Commandant Frank Butler (Ray McAnally) Early 50s, a career military man, father to Helen, Miriam, Ben, and Tina, husband to Anna
Helen Kelly (Fedelma Cullen) 27, divorced, a stylish woman now living in London
Miriam Donnelly (Maire Hastings) 25, a practical mother of three, married to Charlie Donnelly
Ben (Stephen Brennan) 24, lacks self-confidence, a "mother's boy."
Tina (Bernadette Shortt) 18, "the pet of the family."
Father Tom Carty (Michael O'hAonghusa) 64, chaplain to Butler's unit
Charlie Donnelly (Niall O'Brien) Early 30s, married to Miriam, a cautious court clerk
Anna (Dearbhla Molloy) Early 20s, Frank's second wife, mature and intelligent.

== Summary ==
Living Quarters is a memory play set in a soldier's home in Donegal, near Friel's favourite fictional town of Ballybeg. It tells the story of the fateful day that Commandant Frank Butler returns a hero from a successful UN mission in the Middle East. His four children from his first marriage all return home for the celebrations, along with Frank's young wife, Anna.

The extent to which Commandant Butler's first wife (deceased) dominated the family is obvious; Frank's son (Ben) suffered a nervous breakdown on her death, and eldest daughter Helen is still scarred by her mother's opposition to her marriage to a private soldier.

Unique is the way in which the story is told: not through conventional flashbacks, but through an artificial narrator, called Sir, who acts as arbiter and director, making sure that the characters' memories reflect reality. In an environment of people trying to reestablish connections with their family, Ben has a secret he shares with Anna, and the attempts to reveal that secret temporarily bring father and son back together, but ultimately lead to a grim conclusion. Living Quarters deals with accepting responsibility for one's actions.

Critical acclaim was initially muted, but the play has enjoyed increased popularity in later years, including a season at the Greek National Theatre.

Many have considered this play (a proud family with three sisters and a weak brother) to be a forerunner to Friel's masterpiece Aristocrats.
