= Dancing at Lughnasa =

1990 play by dramatist Brian Friel

- Faber and Faber 1990 cover
- Original language: English
- Written by: Brian Friel
- Subject: A month in the lives of five impoverished women.
- Genre: Memory play
- Setting: August 1936, County Donegal, Ireland

Premiere
- Date: 24 April 1990
- Place: Abbey Theatre; Dublin, Ireland

Dancing at Lughnasa is a 1990 play by dramatist Brian Friel set in County Donegal, Ireland in August 1936 in the fictional town of Ballybeg. It is a memory play told from the point of view of the adult Michael Evans, the narrator. He recounts the summer in his aunts' cottage when he was seven years old.

== Background ==
This play is loosely based on the lives of Friel's mother and aunts who lived in Glenties, a small town in the south-west of County Donegal. Set in the summer of 1936, the play depicts the late summer days when love briefly seems possible for five of the Mundy sisters (Maggie, Chris, Agnes, Rose, and Kate) and the family welcomes home the frail elder brother, Jack, who has returned from a life as a missionary in Africa. However, as the summer ends, the family foresees the sadness and economic privations under which they will suffer as all hopes fade.

The play takes place in early August, around the festival of Lughnasadh, the Celtic harvest festival. The play describes a bitter harvest for the Mundy sisters, a time of reaping what has been sown.

== Plot ==
The five Mundy sisters (Kate, Maggie, Agnes, Rosie, and Christina), all unmarried, live in a cottage outside of Ballybeg. The oldest, Kate, is a school teacher, the only one with a well-paid job. Agnes and Rose knit gloves to be sold in town, thereby earning a little extra money for the household. They also help Maggie to keep house. Maggie and Christina (Michael's mother) have no income at all. Michael is seven years old and plays in and around the cottage.

All the drama takes place in the sisters' cottage or in the yard just outside, with events from town and beyond being reported either as they happen or as reminiscence.

Recently returned home after 25 years is their brother Jack, a priest who has lived as a missionary in a leper colony in a remote village called Ryanga in Uganda. He is suffering from malaria and has trouble remembering many things, including the sisters' names and his English vocabulary. It becomes clear that he has "gone native" and abandoned much of his Catholicism during his time there. This may be the real reason he has been sent home.

Gerry, Michael's father, is Welsh. He is a charming yet unreliable man, always clowning. He is a travelling salesman who sells gramophones. He visits rarely and always unannounced. A radio nicknamed "Marconi", which works only intermittently, brings 1930s dance and traditional Irish folk music into the home at rather random moments and then, equally randomly, ceases to play. This leads the women into sudden outbursts of wild dancing.

The poverty and financial insecurity of the sisters is a constant theme. So are their unfulfilled lives: none of the sisters has married, although it is clear that they have had suitors whom they fondly remember.

There is a tension between the strict and proper behaviour demanded by the Catholic Church, voiced most stridently by the upright Kate, and the unbridled emotional paganism of the local people in the "back hills" of Donegal and in the tribal people of Uganda.

There is a possibility that Gerry is serious this time about his marriage proposal to Christina. On this visit, he says he is going to join the International brigade to fight in the Spanish Civil War, not from any ideological commitment but because he wants adventure. There is a similar tension here between the "godless" forces he wants to join and the forces of Franco against which he will be fighting, which are supported by the Catholic Church.

The opening of a knitwear factory in the village has killed off the hand-knitted glove cottage industry that has been the livelihood of Agnes and Rose. The village priest has told Kate that there are insufficient pupils at the school for her to continue in her post in the coming school year in September. She suspects that the real reason is her brother Jack, whose heretical views have become known to the Church and have tainted her by association.

There is a sense that the close home life the women have known since childhood is about to be torn apart. The narrator, the adult Michael, tells us this is indeed what happens.

== Characters ==
Kate Mundy
Kate is the eldest of the Mundy sisters and behaves as a mother figure towards the others. As a schoolteacher, she is the only wage-earner in the house, but her reputation as "The Gander" in the schoolroom is seen to extend into the household. She is a fiercely devout Catholic, indicated by her distaste for the pagan practices at Lughnasa and Jack's loss of faith. However, her sensitivity is evident throughout the play and through the narratives provided by Michael, who claims she was "inconsolable" when Father Jack died.

Maggie Mundy
In place of a career, Maggie acts as the chief family homemaker. Throughout the play she is revealed as serving a deeper purpose as the "joker" of the family, defusing tensions as they arise. She cheekily challenges Kate's authority by calling her "Kitty", whilst being her confidant at the same time. Maggie is seen to have dreams of her own when she learns of her best friend's success. Her sudden quiet contemplation in her monologue is deeply contrasted with her usual fun-loving way of speaking.

Christina Mundy
At 26 years old, Chris is the youngest of the Mundy sisters, and, like Maggie, has no paid job. Gerry Evans fathered her son, Michael, seven years ago and is seen as walking in and out of their lives as he chooses. As a result, Chris fluctuates between falling into a deep depression when he leaves, yet being renewed with optimism that his next visit will be a permanent stay. Her lack of income can lead Chris to be defensive on the upbringing of her son, shown when Kate buys Michael a new spinning top at the beginning of the play.

Rose Mundy
Rose is 32, but behaves much younger than her years, due to a developmental disability. This condition makes her particularly vulnerable to an unseen character, Danny Bradley, a married man, whom Rose believes is in love with her. However, her sisters believe that Bradley is exploiting Rose's simple nature for his own gain. She is particularly close to her older sister, Agnes, with whom she knits gloves to sell in the town. We learn through Michael's narrative that, after leaving home with Agnes, Rose eventually dies in a hospice for the destitute in Southwark, London, in the 1950s.

Agnes Mundy
Agnes is quiet and contemplative, knitting gloves with Rose whilst also helping to keep the house in order, along with Maggie. She appears to be silently infatuated with Gerry and is quick to leap to his defence. However, Michael's narratives reveal Agnes' future to be bleak. Her knitting fails to support her when the knitware factory opens. Due to her sense of parental regard for Rose, she emigrates with her to London, breaking off all contact with the family, and dies in dire circumstances in the 1950s.

Michael Evans (main character)
Michael does not appear onstage as a child, but his presence is alluded to by the other characters, while the adult Michael speaks his lines from the side of the stage. As a child, Michael is seen as being surrounded by love, since all five of the sisters dote on him. Michael also acts as a narrator, not only dictating the action as it goes on, but revealing the futures of the other characters in the play.

Gerry Evans
Gerry is initially portrayed as an intensely negative character, particularly by Kate, for having left Chris after fathering her illegitimate son, Michael. However, upon his first appearance in the play, Gerry is shown to be charming and genuinely affectionate towards Chris. His current job as a gramophone salesman (like his former job as a ballroom dancing instructor) represents his freedom, in sharp contrast to the stagnant lives of the Mundy sisters. This is made all the more obvious by the fact that he is leaving Ireland to join the International Brigade and fight in the Spanish Civil War, something that is further disapproved of by Kate. Through Michael's narration, we learn that Gerry is later left with a limp after falling off a motorbike in Barcelona. As well as having romantic feelings for Chris, Gerry seems particularly inclined towards Agnes, although the true state of their relationship remains in doubt. We learn later that he secretly has another family back in Wales, and that all his proposals of marriage to Christina have been false. Adult narrator Michael reveals that, after Gerry's death in the 1950s, he had been contacted by a half brother in South Wales, who revealed that Gerry had had a wife and several sons there at the time depicted in the drama.

Father Jack
Jack is in his late fifties. He had left home as a young man to work as a missionary in a leper colony in Uganda. Beyond this, he had been a Catholic chaplain in the British Army in East Africa during World War I. He is well respected in Donegal for his missionary work in a leper colony. However, his sudden return to Ballybeg for undisclosed reasons has paved the way for great changes. He has difficulty with his memory, often forgetting the names of his sisters or confusing them with his former house boy Okawa, with whom we are told he was very close. Jack professes a broad admiration for the pagan beliefs of the native people of Africa, and appears to have lost his Catholic faith, which may be the true reason his superiors have sent him back. This is a great worry for Kate, who is concerned about the family's reputation. Jack refers to Michael as a love child rather than an illegitimate child and says they are common and accepted among the people of Uganda.

In a scene near the close of the play he swaps his British colonial tricorn hat, a gift from a British governor, for a lesser hat worn by Gerry. Jack turns the swap into a non-catholic ceremony as well as referring to Uganda as his home. It is Gerry who is now to go abroad seeking adventure just as Jack settles back into his home country.

Father Jack recovers from his malaria and confusion, but Michael as narrator tells us that he died of a heart attack soon after the events portrayed in the play.

== Productions ==
Original production

The play was originally presented at the Abbey Theatre in Dublin in 1990. It transferred to London's National Theatre in 1991, winning the Olivier Award for Best Play, later at the Phoenix Theatre and the Garrick, then subsequently to Broadway's Plymouth Theatre where it won the Tony Award for Best Play as well as a Drama Desk Award nomination for Outstanding Play. The original cast included Frances Tomelty and later Rosaleen Linehan as Kate, Anita Reeves as Maggie, Bríd Ní Neachtain as Rose, Bríd Brennan as Agnes, Catherine Byrne as Chris, Gerard McSorley as Michael, Paul Herzberg and later Stephen Dillane as Gerry Evans and Barry McGovern and later Alec McCowen as Fr. Jack. The original Broadway cast included Rosaleen Linehan as Kate, Dearbhla Molloy as Maggie, Bríd Ní Neachtain as Rose, Bríd Brennan as Agnes (winning a Tony Award for her performance), Catherine Byrne as Chris, Gerard McSorley as Michael, Robert Gwilym as Gerry and Donal Donnelly as Fr. Jack.

1999/2000 Dublin Revival

The play was revived ten years after its original production, again at the Abbey Theatre with the same production team headed by Patrick Mason. The cast included the original Maggie, Anita Reeves in the role of Kate, with Jane Brennan as Agnes, Lynn Cahill as Rose, Des Cave as Fr. Jack, Steve Elliott as Gerry Evans, Anna Healy as Maggie, David Parnell as Michael and Ali White as Chris.

2004 Dublin Revival

In April 2004, Joe Dowling directed a new production of the play at the Gate Theatre. The cast included Aisling O'Neill as Chris, Derbhle Crotty as Maggie, Catherine Walsh as Agnes, Dawn Bradfield as Rose, Andrea Irvine as Kate with John Kavanagh, Peter Gowen and Ben Price.

2009 London Revival

In 2009, the Old Vic Theatre in London presented a well-received production of the play starring Sorcha Cusack, Niamh Cusack, Sinéad Cusack and Andrea Corr.

2010 National Tour (Ireland)

Second Age Theatre Company presented a revival of the play which toured Ireland as part of a National Tour. Directed by David Horan, the cast included Donna Dent, Susannah de Wrixon, Maeve Fitzgerald, Kate Nic Chonaonaigh and Marie Ruane.

2011 UK Tour

In February to April 2011, Alastair Whatley directed a production for the Original Theatre Company that toured the UK. The cast included Victoria Carling, Mairead Conneely, Patricia Gannon, Siobhan O'Kelly, Daragh O'Malley, Bronagh Taggart, Paul Westwood and Alastair Whatley.

2011 Off-Broadway Revival

The Irish Repertory Theatre, staged a new production of the play starting on 19 October 2011, directed by artistic director Charlotte Moore, billed as the 20th Anniversary Production. Ciaran O'Reilly was Michael; Annabel Hagg as Chris; Jo Kinsella – Maggie; Rachel Pickup – Agnes; Aedin Moloney – Rose; Orlagh Cassidy – Kate; Michael Countryman – Jack; and Kevin Collins as Gerry.

2014 Rome (Italy)

The Rome Savoyards theatre company staged an original production of the play directed by Sandra Provost at the 'Teatro San Genesio' from February 4 to February 9 to great acclaim. William O'Neill was Michael; Lydia O'Kane - Chris; Gabriella Spadaro - Maggie; Carolyn Gouger - Agnes; Fabiana De Rose - Rose; Shelagh Stuchbery - Kate; Michael Fitzpatrick - Jack and Shane Harnett - Gerry.

2015 National Tour (Ireland)

The Lyric Theatre in Belfast presented a revival of the play in association with the Dublin Theatre Festival, which toured both North and South of Ireland, with a cast featuring Catherine Cusack, Catherine McCormack and Mary Murray. Directed by Annabelle Comyn.

2023 London Revival

The National Theatre in London presented a production of the play starring Louisa Harland as Agnes, Bláithín Mac Gabhann as Rose, Siobhán McSweeney as Maggie, Justine Mitchell as Kate, Ardal O'Hanlon as Jack, Alison Oliver as Chris, Tom Riley as Gerry, and Tom Vaughan-Lawlor as Michael. The director was Josie Rourke.

2025 Sheffield and Manchester Revival

A joint production between Sheffield Theatres and The Royal Exchange Theatre Manchester. Featuring: Martha Dunlea as Christina, Kwaku Fortune as Michael, Frank Laverty as Jack, Rachel O'Connell as Rose, Siobhan O'Kelly as Margaret, Laura Pyper as Agnes, Natalie Radmall-Quirke as Kate and Marcus Rutherford as Gerry. Directed by Elizabeth Newman.

== Film adaptation ==
Dancing at Lughnasa was adapted for a 1998 film of the same name starring Meryl Streep as Kate Mundy and directed by Pat O'Connor. Brid Brennan won an Irish Film and Television Award for Best Actor in a Female Role.

== LIFF ==
The first Lughnasa International Friel Festival (LIFF) occurred in August 2015. Dancing at Lughnasa, in the year of its 25th anniversary, was chosen as its signature production.

== Awards and nominations ==
Awards

- 1991 Olivier Award for Best Play of the Year (BBC Award)
- 1992 Tony Award for Best Play
- 1992 Tony Award for Best Featured Actress in a Play – Brid Brennan as Agnes
- 1992 Tony Award for Best Direction of a Play – Patrick Mason
- 1992 Drama Desk Award for Outstanding Director of a Play – Patrick Mason
- 1992 Drama Desk Award for Outstanding Ensemble Performance
- 1991 Evening Standard Award for Best Play
- 1992 New York Drama Critics' Circle Best Play

Nominations

- 1991 Olivier Award for Best Director of a Play – Patrick Mason
- 1991 Olivier Award for Best Theatre Choreography – Terry John Bates
- 1991 Olivier Award for Best Supporting Actress in a Play – Anita Reeves as Maggie
- 1992 Drama Desk Award for Outstanding New Play - Brian Friel
- 1992 Drama Desk Award for Outstanding Lighting Design – Trevor Dawson
- 1992 Drama Desk Award for Outstanding Set Design – Joe Vanek
- 1992 Tony Award for Best Featured Actress in a Play – Rosaleen Linehan as Kate
- 1992 Tony Award for Best Featured Actress in a Play – Dearbhla Molloy as Maggie
- 1992 Tony Award for Best Choreography – Christopher Chadman
- 1992 Tony Award for Best Scenic Design – Joe Vanek
- 1992 Tony Award for Best Costume Design – Joe Vanek
