= Four Days in July =

British TV film

- Genre: Drama
- Written by: Mike Leigh
- Directed by: Mike Leigh
- Starring: Brid Brennan; Stephen Rea; Paula Hamilton; Charles Lawson; Eileen Pollock
- Composer: Rachel Portman
- Country of origin: United Kingdom
- Original language: English

Production
- Producer: Kenith Trodd
- Cinematography: Remi Adefarasin
- Editor: Robin Sales
- Running time: 96 minutes
- Production company: BBC

Original release
- Network: BBC One
- Release: 29 November 1984

Four Days in July is a 1984 television film by Mike Leigh. Set and filmed in Belfast, the film explores the Troubles by following the daily lives of two couples on either side of Northern Ireland's religious divide, both expecting their first children. The film's action unfolds over 10–13 July 1984; the two couples' children are both born on 12 July, the date of a Protestant celebration in Northern Ireland known as the Twelfth. Despite the politically charged setting, the film is uniquely uneventful, at least on the surface; Paul Clements writes that "It is hard to identify any full length work by Leigh in which less of consequence seems to happen." Broadcast only once, it was Leigh's last film for the BBC.

== Cast and crew ==
The film stars Paula Hamilton and Charles Lawson as the Protestant couple, Lorraine and Billy, and Brid Brennan and Des McAleer as the Catholic couple, Collette and Eugene. Stephen Rea, Eileen Pollock, BJ Hogg, and Shane Connaughton appear in secondary roles. The film's music was composed by Rachel Portman.

== Reception ==
In 2009 The Times' Kevin Maher praised the film as a "must-see movie for anyone with a compassionate interest in an 800-year-old political sore."
