= Knockmoyle =

Coordinates: 54.650°N 7.316667°W

Knockmoyle: Irish: Cnoc Maol
- Location within Northern Ireland
- Population: 329 (2001 Census)
- County: County Tyrone
- Country: Northern Ireland
- Sovereign state: United Kingdom
- Postcode district: BT
- Dialling code: 028

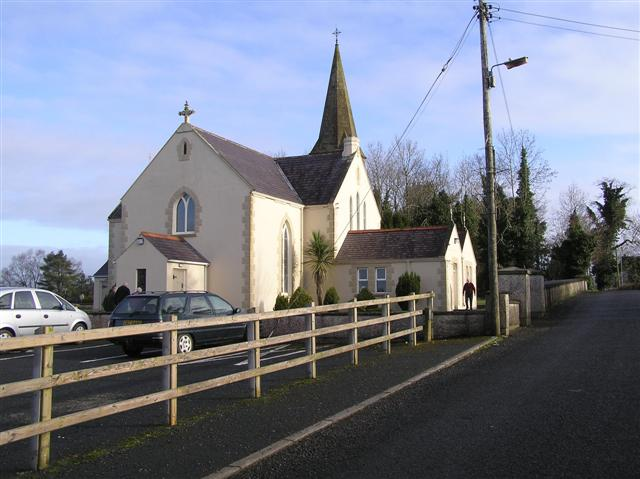
St Mary's Roman Catholic church, Knockmoyle.

Knockmoyle (/nɒkˈmɔɪl/ nok-MOYL; from Irish an Cnoc Maol, meaning 'the bald hill') is a hamlet and townland approximately 8 kilometres northwest of Omagh in County Tyrone, Northern Ireland. In the 2001 census the Knockmoyle area had 141 households and a population of 329. It has a post office, church (est. 1800) and public house. The nearby River Strule is well known for its trout fishing. Other attractions nearby include the Gortin Glens Forest Park and the Ulster American Folk Park. The Ulster Way walking route passes through Knockmoyle.

== Background ==
Knockmoyle is the birthplace of Brian Friel (9 January 1929 – 2 October 2015) an Irish dramatist, short story writer and founder of the Field Day Theatre Company. Friel is considered one of the greatest English-language dramatists.

Omagh United Football Club, formed in the summer of 2007 from an amalgamation of three Omagh soccer clubs, played its home matches at the Athletic Park in Knockmoyle until the club was forced to fold at the end of the 2009/10 season due to financial reasons. In its first season Omagh United played in the Fermanagh and Western League and in the 2008/2009 season progressed into Intermediate B of the Mid Ulster Football League. The club had a highly successful year and won the league before playing in Intermediate A, part of the Northern Ireland football league system, until it folded in 2010.

Knockmoyle Shamrocks was one of the earliest Gaelic football clubs in west Tyrone. In May 1920 the club competed in the inaugural West Tyrone league along with five other clubs namely Fintona Pearses, Omagh Colemans, Carnlea Emmetts, Tattysallagh and Aughafad. Knockmoyle competed at junior level in the early 1950s, winning the Davis Cup in 1951 and 1953 and played in two junior football championship finals. A hurling club was formed in Knockmoyle in 1947 which won 3 Tyrone Senior hurling titles in 1947, 1950 and 1953 (although these titles are attributed to a separate parish club namely Killyclogher St Mary's in contemporary records).

A boxing club operated in Knockmoyle for a number of years during the 1970s.

A very successful table tennis club was based in Knockmoyle from the mid-1970s until the mid-1980s. The club won several county titles and some of its players also won individual county championship titles.

Knockmoyle had its own primary school until the mid-1960s which was founded under the will of John McEvoy who endowed it with £16 per annum "for the gratuitous education of the poor children in Mountjoy Forest, and vested in its management in the Rector for ever."
