= Fathers and Sons (play) =

Fathers and Sons is a 1987 play by the Irish playwright Brian Friel, adapting the 1862 novel of the same name by Ivan Turgenev. It premiered at the Royal National Theatre on 26 June 1987. It was revived at the Donmar Warehouse from 5 June to 26 July 2014.
