= Anne Devlin (film) =

1984 film

- Directed by: Pat Murphy
- Written by: Pat Murphy
- Produced by: Pat Murphy
- Starring: Brid Brennan
- Cinematography: Thaddeus O'Sullivan
- Release dates: October 1984 (Chicago); December 1984 (UK)
- Running time: 121 minutes
- Country: Ireland
- Language: English

Anne Devlin is a 1984 Irish drama film directed by Pat Murphy. It was entered into the 14th Moscow International Film Festival.

== Cast ==
- Brid Brennan as Anne Devlin
- Bosco Hogan as Robert Emmet
- Des McAleer as James Hope
- Gillian Hackett as Rose Hope
- David Kelly as Dr. Trevor
- Ian McElhinney as Major Sirr
- Chris O'Neill as Thomas Russell
- Pat Leavy as Mrs. Devlin
- Marie Conmee as Mrs. Darby
- John Cowley as Devlin
