= Maeve (film) =

1981 film

- Directed by: Pat Murphy; John Davies
- Screenplay by: Pat Murphy
- Starring: Mary Jackson
- Cinematography: Robert Smith
- Edited by: John Davies
- Music by: Robert Boyle; Pete Nu
- Release date: 1981

Maeve is a 1981 experimental drama art film written by Pat Murphy, who co-directed it along with John Davies. A co-production between the United Kingdom and Ireland, it premiered out of competition at the 38th edition of the Venice Film Festival. It was the first British Film Institute production to be screened at the Venice Festival. It has been called Ireland's "first bona-fide feminist film."

== Plot ==
In Belfast during the Troubles, a soldier knocks on Martin Sweeney's door and warns him about a bomb. While waiting it out, he writes to his daughter, Maeve, who is at a party.

Having just landed at the airport, Maeve takes a bus bound for Belfast. While on the bus, the film flashbacks to a younger Maeve visiting her then-boyfriend, Liam Doyle. The two make love. Shortly after getting off the bus, there is a flashback to younger Maeve confronting a boy for hitting her sister, Roisin. Later that day, loyalist marches are happening on their street. As the family watch the marches on TV, something is thrown at and smashes their window. The flashback ends with the family moving out of the dominantly unionist street.

While Maeve is riding home in a taxi, they are stopped by soldiers because of an active bomb threat. There, she's reunited with her parents, who are already waiting outside.

Roisin is stopped by soldiers while coming home from work. They question her and bring her home. By the fireplace, she tells Maeve the story of a sleepover during a friend's birthday where a soldier walked into the room and got into bed between them, stating that he's dying to have sex with one of them. The soldier left after they screamed.

In a flashback, Maeve and Liam walk into a pub. Maeve expresses desire to leave because her uncles, Joe and Colm, are also there. Joe buys them drinks and invites them to their table. He tells the story of when he and Colm buried a box of gelignite under a flowerbed in Martin's house, an operation which landed Martin a year in the Crumlin Road Gaol. As they're laughing, Maeve gets up and says, "You did that to your own brother and he never told on you." When Joe suggests that her mother, Eileen, might have informed on them, she states that her mother kept the family together while he was in prison. She smashes the glasses off the table and runs out, with Liam running after her. She tells him that she has to get away from Belfast.

Roisin tells Maeve a story about a masked man attempting to hijack the taxi she and Eileen were in. Roisin and the driver got out, but Eileen leapt at the man and berated him. The man lunged back. Two other men intervened and told them to get back in the taxi and drive away.

In a flashback, child Maeve waits in the van while Martin tries to sell cakes. A man opens the van door and asks whether they came from the Free State in an accusing manner. Martin gets back and drives off.

Maeve and Roisin are stopped by a trio of soldiers, who tell them to jump. The film flashbacks to Maeve with Liam atop a hill. They have an argument about the way they understand the past to understand the present, ending off with Maeve telling him that he remembers the past in a way that excludes her and remembers her out of existence.

Back home, Maeve tells Roisin she's worried about her in case she ends up "giving in." Roisin responds begrudgingly, to which Maeve tells her, "Women's sexuality is so abused that it's almost an act of liberation to turn yourself into a sex object."

They go out for the night, joining up with two of Roisin's friends. They get into a taxi with a drunk man already in it. He harasses Maeve while Roisin's friends egg him on. The film flashbacks to Liam visiting Maeve in London. The two are now broken up. He confronts her about moving to London and not knowing what she's doing, and she replies saying she has a right to not know what she's doing.

Maeve, Roisin and her friends go into a pub. Liam is also there, but they don't interact. The women leave, laughing. As they're walking home, a gunshot rings out in the distance, followed by automatic fire. They run down the road and stop at a brick wall. More gunshots ring out, and they drop down and sit, laughing.

Maeve and Eileen are at home talking. Elieen recounts her perspective of the time she saw Maeve off at the airport. She gets worked up when she reminds Maeve that she never looked back to say goodbye. The film flashbacks to Maeve in class at a convent. Later, she's in a hospital bed talking to Roisin, who leaves when three nuns show up, demanding that Maeve explain herself. The scene fades out here. Faded in is a scene of Maeve crying in the hospital bed. A woman comforts and sings to her.

Maeve walks out of a bookstore and runs into Liam. They have an argument about the aims of the Irish republican movement. She laments that the movement doesn't include women's rights in it. He sees her protestations as a hindrance to the movement.

Maeve, Roisin and Eileen are at the Giant's Causeway. A man squats beside Maeve and starts talking to her. She leaves, and the man continues soliloquying.

Martin retells an instance where he was being chased by police forces and a man was forcing him to drive at gunpoint. The newspapers had falsely stated his van was being used as a getaway car. The film ends with him saying, "First time they got me into Castlereagh, I thought I'd break. See, I used to think these things would never happen to me. Even when they did. Cos you see, that's the only way to go on. Aye. All the time I'm afear'd it is going to happen."

== Cast ==
- Mary Jackson as Maeve Sweeney
- Mark Mulholland as Martin Sweeney
- Bríd Brennan as Roisin
- Trudy Kelly as Eileen
- John Keegan as Liam Doyle
- Nuala McCann as Young Maeve
- George Shane as Causeway Man
- Aingeal Grehan as Joan O'Neill

== Style ==
Maeve has a disjointed narrative. In 2012, Murphy said that she was unable to make the film with a clear narrative, as her own experience was that "there was no clear narrative, only a fractured one."

Murphy has named Jean-Luc Godard and Bertolt Brecht as influences for the film.

== See also ==
- Independent cinema in the United Kingdom
