= Pat Murphy (director) =

Irish director (born 1951)

- Born: 1951 (age 74–75); Dublin, Ireland
- Occupations: Film director, screenwriter
- Years active: 1982–2002

Pat Murphy (born 1951) is an Irish feminist filmmaker and lecturer, the director of Maeve (1981), Anne Devlin (1984), and Nora (2000).

== Life and career ==
=== Early years and education ===
Born in Dublin, Murphy graduated from the Ulster College of Art and Design, followed by a BA in fine art at Hornsey College of Art and an MA in film and television from the Royal College of Art in London, where she studied under feminist theorist Laura Mulvey. In 1977, hoping to train as a cinematographer, she was the first European to achieve a scholarship year at the Whitney Museum of American Art in New York, which influenced her decision to become a director. She completed a short film, Rituals of Memory, before returning to Ireland to work on her first feature film.

=== Career ===
Co-directed with John Davies but generally attributed to Murphy, Maeve (1981) was funded by the British Film Institute and later judged by Irish Times film critic Tara Brady to be "Ireland's first bona-fide feminist film". In 2012, Murphy recalled her approach: "I didn't think about story. I'd think something like: representations of Northern Ireland are unsatisfactory: I'm going to make Maeve and sort it all out... Maeve was asking how does a woman position herself against the background of what was going on in the North and within the history of republicanism and memory and landscape... I was influenced by [Jean Luc] Godard and [Bertholt] Brecht." The film's narrative and timeline are non-linear throughout. In a 2019 interview with the Irish Times, with the release of the TV programme 50 Years of the Troubles: A Journey Through Film, Northern Irish film historian Mark Cousins shortlisted Maeve in a collection intended to inform the (then) British PM Boris Johnson about the Northern Ireland conflict. Maeve was rereleased by the British Film Institute in 2021. Irish filmmaker Chris O'Neill created a video essay on Maeve to coincide with the rerelease. In an article on the BFI website in 2021, writer Trever Johnston stated that' Maeve is a startlingly radical Irish experiment ripe for rediscovery.' In a 2021 article in the Irish Times, film reviewer Tara Brady remarked 'Revisiting Maeve on the eve of a major reissue by the British Film Institute (BFI), one is struck by its formal daring, contemporary relevance and anticipation of the corrective histories that shaped the 1916 centenary celebrations.'

For Murphy's second film, Anne Devlin, she worked from the prison diaries of Anne Devlin (19th-century Irish revolutionary Robert Emmet's housekeeper) to rediscover her life and times. "I was amazed by how cinematic it was. Scenes were described in enough detail to construct shots for the movie. I think after making Maeve I became more interested in story. And with Anne Devlin's journal I wanted to tell a story that was like a ballad". It represented Ireland at international festivals such as Edinburgh, Moscow, Chicago, Toronto and London.

In 1987, Murphy was a founder board member of the Filmbase facility in Dublin's Temple Bar. The following year saw her write and co-direct the two-part documentary Sean MacBride Remembers, an exploration of the Irish republican politician and Nobel Peace Prize winner. She then turned her hand to a mixture of artistic disciplines: in theatre, with The Parade of Innocence and The River Parade (both 1989), in fine art practice and curatorship with the Irish Museum of Modern Art, and in installation with a 1992 film for the Strokestown Famine Museum. In 1993 she co-directed Reflections from the Roof of the World.

=== Nora ===
Her next feature film was Nora (2000), a study of writer James Joyce's partner Nora Barnacle, with Susan Lynch in the lead role and Ewan McGregor as Joyce. After researching Joyce in the hope of filming an element of his life or work, Murphy found an appropriate point of entry through Brenda Maddox's biography of Barnacle, which "points out how the all-pervasiveness of Nora's voice in Joyce's writing has paradoxically rendered her invisible to the reader," she explained. The film earned her the United International Pictures Director's Award and Irish Film and Television Awards. As of 2023, it is her only film that remains generally available.

In 2002, Murphy made the short film What Mira Saw and the following year was elected a member of the Irish artists' group Aosdána, at which point she taught film at Queen's University Belfast and sat on the board of the Screen Directors' Guild of Ireland. She has also made an Irish language film entitled Ar lorg Sorcha (Searching for Sorcha) about the sean-nós singer Sorcha Ni Ghuairim from Carna, Connemara. This was shown in 2006 on TG4, the Irish language television channel.

In 2012, Murphy's three major films were included in The Sunday Times' list of the top 100 Irish films of all time. That July, they were presented along with a public interview in a retrospective at the Irish Film Institute in Dublin. She is preparing a documentary on Muslim weavers and since the release of Nora was reported to have lectured in Singapore for three years and travelled around India for ten. She is an Associate Arts Professor at the New York University Tisch School of the Arts, Asia graduate film programme.

== See also ==
- List of Irish film directors
