= Dancing at Lughnasa (film) =

- Theatrical release poster
- Directed by: Pat O'Connor
- Screenplay by: Frank McGuinness
- Based on: Dancing at Lughnasa; 1991 play by Brian Friel
- Produced by: Noel Pearson
- Starring: Meryl Streep; Michael Gambon; Catherine McCormack; Kathy Burke; Bríd Brennan; Sophie Thompson; Rhys Ifans
- Cinematography: Kenneth MacMillan
- Edited by: Humphrey Dixon
- Music by: Bill Whelan
- Distributed by: Sony Pictures Classics (United States); FilmFour Distributors (Ireland and United Kingdom)
- Release date: 13 November 1998
- Running time: 95 minutes
- Countries: Ireland; United States
- Language: English
- Box office: $2.3 million

Dancing at Lughnasa is a 1998 Irish-British-American period drama film adapted from the 1990 Brian Friel play Dancing at Lughnasa, directed by Pat O'Connor.

The film competed in the 1998 Venice Film Festival. It won an Irish Film and Television Award for Best Actor in a Female Role by Bríd Brennan. It was also nominated for six other awards, including the Irish Film and Television Award for Best Feature Film and the Best Actress Award for Meryl Streep.

== Plot ==
Kate Mundy (Meryl Streep) is the eldest of five sisters living together in a small house in Ireland in 1936. The only one with a steady job, Kate oversees the various conflicting personalities. Though none of the women are married, Christina (Catherine McCormack) has a young son named Michael. The household works well in its fashion, but after the sisters' addle-minded brother, Jack (Michael Gambon), shows up, then Michael's father, Gerry (Rhys Ifans), things are unlikely to stay the same.

== Cast and characters ==
- Meryl Streep as Kate Mundy
- Michael Gambon as Father Jack Mundy
- Catherine McCormack as Christina Mundy
- Kathy Burke as Maggie Mundy
- Sophie Thompson as Rose Mundy
- Bríd Brennan as Agnes Mundy
- Rhys Ifans as Gerry Evans
- Darrell Johnston as Michael Mundy
- Lorcan Cranitch as Danny Bradley
- Peter Gowen as Austin Morgan
- Dawn Bradfield as Sophia McLoughlin
- Marie Mullen as Vera McLoughlin
- John Kavanagh as Father Carlin
- Kate O'Toole as Chemist

== Reception and awards ==
Although the film received average reviews (60% 'Fresh' rating on Rotten Tomatoes from 35 reviews), most critics praised the performances of the entire cast. Janet Maslin, critic of the New York Times said that "Meryl Streep has made many a grand acting gesture in her career, but the way she simply peers out a window in Dancing at Lughnasa ranks with the best. Everything the viewer need know about Kate Mundy, the woman she plays here, is written on that prim, lonely face and its flabbergasted gaze." Peter Travers of Rolling Stone magazine wrote that "a luminous cast reveals long-buried feelings. Meryl Streep finds the expansive soul behind prim schoolteacher Kate. And she is matched by Kathy Burke's bawdy Maggie, Brid Brennan's secretive Agnes, Sophie Thompson's slow-witted Rose and Catherine McCormack's bold Christina, who never married the father of her son."

Kathy Burke received a nomination for Best Supporting Actress – Drama from the International Press Academy (Satellite Awards).

Mementos from the filming are on display at the St. Connell's Museum in Glenties.
