= Room Taken =

2023 Irish short drama film

- Promotional poster
- Directed by: Tj O'Grady Peyton
- Story by: Michael Whelan
- Produced by: Colmán Mac Cionnaith
- Starring: Bríd Brennan; Gabriel Adewusi; Walé Adebusuyi
- Cinematography: Evan Barry
- Edited by: Derek Holland
- Music by: Jamal Green
- Production companies: Screen Ireland; Vico Pictures & Sound; Grapevine Films
- Release date: 11 November 2023 (Cork International Film Festival)
- Running time: 19 minutes
- Country: Ireland
- Language: English

Room Taken is a 2023 Irish short film directed by Tj O'Grady Peyton. Starring Bríd Brennan, Gabriel Adewusi and Walé Adebusuyi, it follows Isaac, newly arrived in Ireland and looking for a place to stay, when he secretly moves into the home of Victoria, an elderly blind woman, leading them to form a unique bond. It premiered on 11 November 2023 at the 68th Cork International Film Festival.

In December 2024, it was shortlisted for the Best Live Action Short Film at the 97th Academy Awards.

== Plot ==
The film narrates the story of Isaac, a newly arrived immigrant in Ireland who becomes part of the increasing homeless population. His unexpected encounter with Victoria, an elderly blind woman, sets off a chain of unforeseen events.

The film opens with Isaac waking up in a child's bedroom after spending the night at a friend's house. It's very early in the morning, and he must leave before the child's mother returns and sees him. Feeling homeless and helpless, Isaac considers sleeping on the cold streets at night. However, his fortune changes when he meets Victoria at a shop. He follows her home to help with something she left behind and, uncertain of where to spend the night, decides to stay at her place, knowing she can't see him. Within a few days, Isaac starts performing small tasks around the house. Meanwhile, Victoria is grappling with not only her blindness but also the recent loss of her husband, whom she believes is responsible for the unusual occurrences in her home.

== Cast ==
- Bríd Brennan as Victoria
- Gabriel Adewusi as Issac
- Walé Adebusuyi as Samuel
- Amy Conroy as Ruth
- Jeff O'Toole as Glen
- Helen Norton as Fran

== Release ==
Room Taken had its premiere on 11 November 2023 at the 68th Cork International Film Festival.

In August 2024, it made to official selection of the HollyShorts Film Festival.

The film was showcased at the Oldenburg International Film Festival on 15 September 2024 for its German Premiere. On 17 October 2024 it was presented at the San Diego International Film Festival for its San Diego Premiere in When Worlds Collide section.

On 8 November 2024, it was played in Narrative Shorts 3 at the St. Louis International Film Festival in International Spotlight Section.

On 21 November 2024, it was screened at the Pittsburgh Shorts Film Festival, on its opening night for Pennsylvania Premiere.

== Reception ==
Tony Asankomah reviewing for GhMovie Freak rated the film 4 out of 5 stars. Asankomah praising cinematography, wrote that Besides its rich themes, Room Taken is a visually compelling short film, with cinematography that effectively portrays the circumstances and viewpoints of the main characters. He opined that the film's sophistication is further enhanced by a carefully composed musical score that amplifies the emotional impact of each scene.

== Accolades ==
Award	Date of ceremony	Category	Recipient(s)	Result	Ref.
Dublin International Film Festival	2 March 2024	Sue Bruce-Smith Best Irish Short Award	Room Taken	Won	
Cleveland International Film Festival	21 April 2024	Best Live-Action Short Jury Award	Room Taken	Won	
Manhattan Short Film Festival	6 October 2024	Gold Medal	TJ O'Grady-Peyton	Won	
Indie Shorts Awards Cannes	10 November 2024	Best Actress	Brid Brennan	Won	

== See also ==
- Academy Award for Best Live Action Short Film
- 97th Academy Awards
