= Brian Friel =

Irish dramatist, author and theatre director (1929–2015)

- Friel in 2009
- Born: Brian Patrick Friel c. 9 January 1929; Knockmoyle, County Tyrone, Northern Ireland
- Died: 2 October 2015 (aged 86); Greencastle, County Donegal, Ireland
- Education: St Patrick's College, Maynooth (BA, 1949); St. Joseph's Training College, Belfast (1950)
- Occupations: Dramatist, author and theatre director
- Spouse: Anne Morrison (m. 1954)
- Children: 5
- Writing career
- Notable works: Philadelphia, Here I Come! (1964); Faith Healer (1979); Translations (1980); Dancing at Lughnasa (1990)
- Notable awards: • Tony Award Nominations: Philadelphia, Here I Come! (1966); Lovers (1969) • NY Drama Critics Circle Award (1989) • Olivier Award (1991) • Writers' Guild of Britain Award (1991) • Tony Award for Best Play for Dancing at Lughnasa (1992) • Saoi (of Aosdána) (2006)

Senator
- In office 23 April 1987 – 1 November 1989
- Constituency: Nominated by the Taoiseach

Personal details
- Party: Independent

Brian Patrick Friel (Note: His exact birth date and name are ambiguous. The parish register lists a birth name of Brian Patrick Ó'Friel and a birth date of 9 January. Elsewhere his birth name is given as Bernard Patrick Friel and his birth date as 10 January. In life he was known simply as Brian Friel and celebrated his birthday on 9 January. Friel himself remarked in a letter to Richard Pine: "Perhaps I'm twins.") (c. 9 January 1929 – 2 October 2015) was an Irish dramatist, short story writer and founder of the Field Day Theatre Company. He had been considered one of the greatest living English-language dramatists. He has been likened to an "Irish Chekhov" and described as "the universally accented voice of Ireland". His plays have been compared favourably to those of contemporaries such as Samuel Beckett, Arthur Miller, Harold Pinter and Tennessee Williams.

Recognised for early works such as Philadelphia, Here I Come! and Faith Healer, Friel had 24 plays published in a career of more than a half-century. He was elected to the honorary position of Saoi of Aosdána. His plays were commonly produced on Broadway in New York City throughout this time, as well as in Ireland and the UK. In 1980 Friel co-founded Field Day Theatre Company and his play Translations was the company's first production. With Field Day, Friel collaborated with Seamus Heaney, 1995 recipient of the Nobel Prize in Literature. Heaney and Friel first became friends after Friel sent the young poet a letter following publication of his book Death of a Naturalist.

Friel was a member of the American Academy of Arts and Letters, the British Royal Society of Literature and the Irish Academy of Letters. He was appointed to Seanad Éireann in 1987 and served until 1989. In later years, Dancing at Lughnasa reinvigorated Friel's oeuvre, bringing him Tony Awards (including Best Play), the Laurence Olivier Award for Best New Play and the New York Drama Critics Circle Award for Best Play. It was also adapted into a film, starring Meryl Streep, directed by Pat O'Connor, script by Frank McGuinness.

== Personal life ==
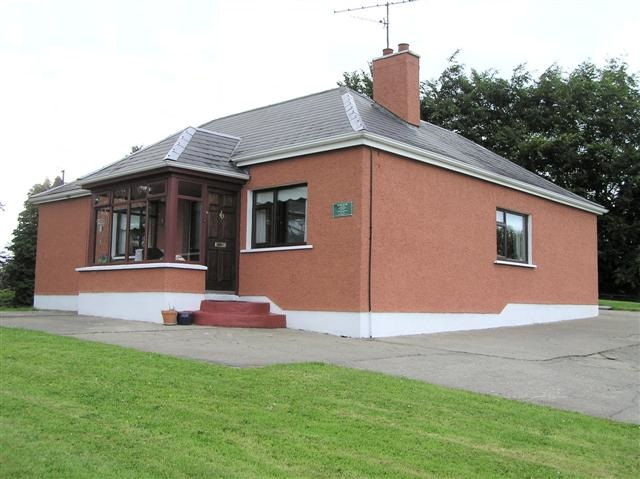
Friel's childhood home at Omagh in County Tyrone

Friel was born in 1929 at Knockmoyle, Northern Ireland, before the family moved to nearby Killyclogher, both places close to Omagh in County Tyrone. His exact birth date and name are ambiguous. His father was Patrick Friel, a primary school teacher and later a councillor on Londonderry Corporation, the local city council in Derry. Friel's mother was Mary (née McLoone), postmistress of Glenties, County Donegal. The family moved to Derry when Friel was ten years old. There he attended St Columb's College (the same school attended by Seamus Heaney, John Hume, Seamus Deane, Phil Coulter, Eamonn McCann and Paul Brady).

Friel received his B.A. from St Patrick's College, Maynooth (1945–1948), and qualified as a teacher at St. Joseph's Training College, Belfast in Belfast, 1949–1950. He married Anne Morrison on 28 December 1954; they had four daughters and one son. Between 1950 and 1960, he worked as a maths teacher in the Derry primary and intermediate school system, taking leave in 1960 to pursue a career as a writer, living off his savings. In the late 1960s, the Friels moved from Derry to Muff, County Donegal, before settling outside Greencastle, County Donegal.

Friel supported Irish nationalism and was a member of the Nationalist Party. Taoiseach Charles Haughey nominated Friel to serve as a member of Seanad Éireann (the Irish Senate) in 1987, where he served until 1989.

After a long illness, Friel died on 2 October 2015 in Greencastle and is buried in the cemetery in Glenties, also in Donegal. He was survived by his wife Anne and children Mary, Judy, Sally and David. Another daughter, Patricia ("Paddy"), predeceased him. While leaving the bulk of his estate to his wife, he bequeathed a house or apartment to each of his living children, and shared his literary estate between them and the children of Patricia. His literary executors were his wife and a friend, the former director for literature at the Arts Council of England, Paul McKeone.

== Literary career ==
A common setting for Friel's plays is in or around the fictional town of "Ballybeg" (from the Irish Baile Beag, meaning "Small Town"). There are fourteen such plays: Philadelphia, Here I Come!, Crystal and Fox, The Gentle Island, Living Quarters, Faith Healer, Aristocrats, Translations, The Communication Cord, Dancing at Lughnasa, Wonderful Tennessee, Molly Sweeney, Give Me Your Answer Do! and The Home Place, while the seminal event of Faith Healer takes place in the town. These plays present an extended history of this imagined community, with Translations and The Home Place set in the nineteenth century, and Dancing at Lughnasa in the 1930s. With the other plays set in "the present" but written throughout the playwright's career from the early 1960s through the late 1990s, the audience is presented with the evolution of rural Irish society, from the isolated and backward town that Gar flees in the 1964 Philadelphia, Here I Come! to the prosperous and multicultural small city of Molly Sweeney (1994) and Give Me Your Answer Do! (1997), where the characters have health clubs, ethnic restaurants, and regular flights to the world's major cities.

=== 1959 – 1975 ===
Friel's first radio plays were produced by Ronald Mason for the BBC Northern Ireland Home Service in 1958: A Sort of Freedom (16 January 1958) and To This Hard House (24 April 1958). Friel began writing short stories for The New Yorker in 1959 and subsequently published two well-received collections: The Saucer of Larks (1962) and The Gold in the Sea (1966). These were followed by A Doubtful Paradise, his first stage play, produced by the Ulster Group Theatre in late August 1960. Friel also wrote 59 articles for The Irish Press, a Dublin-based party-political newspaper, from April 1962 to August 1963; this series included short stories, political editorials on life in Northern Ireland and Donegal, his travels to Dublin and New York City, and his childhood memories of Derry, Omagh, Belfast, and Donegal.

Early in Friel's career, the Irish journalist Sean Ward even referred to him in an Irish Press article as one of the Abbey Theatre's "rejects". Friel's play, The Enemy Within (1962) enjoyed success, despite only being on the Abbey stage for 9 performances. Belfast's Lyric Theatre revived it in September 1963 and the BBC Northern Ireland Home Service and Radio Éireann both aired it in 1963. Although Friel later withdrew The Blind Mice (1963), it was by far the most successful play of his very early period, playing for 6 weeks at Dublin's Eblana Theatre, revived by the Lyric, and broadcast by Radio Éireann and the BBC Home Service almost ten times by 1967. Friel had a short stint as "observer" at Tyrone Guthrie's theater in early-1960s Minneapolis; he remarked on it as "enabling" in that it gave him "courage and daring to attempt things".

Shortly after returning from his time at the Tyrone Guthrie Theatre, Friel wrote Philadelphia Here I Come! (1964). The play made him instantly famous in Dublin, London, and New York. The Loves of Cass McGuire (1966), and Lovers (1967) were both successful in Ireland, with Lovers also popular in The United States. Despite Friel's successes in playwriting, Friel in the period saw himself as primarily a short story writer, in a 1965 interview stating, "I don't concentrate on the theatre at all. I live on short stories."

Friel then turned his attention to contemporary Irish political issues, writing The Mundy Scheme (1969) and Volunteers (1975). Both plays heavily satirised the government of Ireland. The latter depicted an archaeological excavation on the day before the site was turned over to a hotel developer, using Dublin's Wood Quay controversy as its contemporary point of reference. The play's title refers to a group of Irish Republican Army detainees who have been indefinitely interned by the Irish government, and the term Volunteer is both ironic, in that as prisoners they have no free will, and political, in that the IRA used the term to refer to its members. Using the site as a physical metaphor for the nation's history, the play's action examines how Irish history has been commodified, sanitized, and oversimplified to fit the political needs of society.

By 1968, Friel was again living in Derry, a hotbed of the Northern Ireland civil rights movement, where incidents such as the Battle of the Bogside inspired Friel's choice to write a new play set in the city. The play Friel began drafting in Derry would eventually become The Freedom of the City (1973). Defying a government ban, Friel marched with members of the Northern Ireland Civil Rights Association against the policy of internment on 13 January 1972, an event that would become known as Bloody Sunday. During the march, British troops from the 1st Battalion, Parachute Regiment opened fire on the marchers, killing 14 people and wounding a further 26. His personal experience of being fired at by soldiers during the march greatly affected the drafting of The Freedom of the City as a heavily political play. In the interview, Friel recalled: "It was really a shattering experience that the British army, this disciplined instrument, would go in as they did that time and shoot thirteen people... to have to throw yourself on the ground because people are firing at you is really a terrifying experience."

=== 1976 – 1989 ===
By the mid-1970s, Friel had moved away from overtly political plays to examine family dynamics in a manner that has attracted many comparisons to the work of Chekhov. Living Quarters (1977), a play that examines the suicide of a domineering father, is a retelling of the Theseus/Hippolytus myth in a contemporary Irish setting. This play, with its focus on several sisters and their ne'er-do-well brother, serves as a type of preparation for Friel's more successful Aristocrats (1979), a Chekhovian study of a once-influential family's financial collapse and, perhaps, social liberation from the aristocratic myths that have constrained the children. Aristocrats was the first of three plays premiered over a period of eighteen months which would come to define Friel's career as a dramatist, the others being Faith Healer (1979) and Translations (1980).

Faith Healer is a series of four conflicting monologues delivered by dead and living characters who struggle to understand the life and death of Frank Hardy, the play's itinerant healer who can neither understand nor command his unreliable powers, and the lives sacrificed to his destructive charismatic life. Many of Friel's earlier plays had incorporated assertively avant garde techniques: splitting the main character Gar into two actors in Philadelphia, Here I Come!, portraying dead characters in "Winners" of Lovers, Freedom, and Living Quarters, a Brechtian structural alienation and choric figures in Freedom of the City, metacharacters existing in a collective unconscious Limbo in Living Quarters. These experiments came to fruition in Faith Healer. Later in Friel's career, such experimental aspects became buried beneath the surface of more seemingly realist plays like Translations (1980) and Dancing at Lughnasa (1990); however, avant-garde techniques remain a fundamental aspect of Friel's work into his late career.

Translations was premiered in 1980 at Guildhall, Derry by the Field Day Theatre Company, with Stephen Rea, Liam Neeson, and Ray MacAnally. Set in 1833, it is a play about language, the meeting of English and Irish cultures, the looming Great Famine, the coming of a free national school system that will eliminate the traditional hedge schools, the English expedition to convert all Irish place names into English, and the crossed love between an Irish woman who speaks no English and an English soldier who speaks no Irish. It was an instant success. The innovative conceit of the play is to stage two language communities (the Gaelic and the English), which have few and very limited ways to speak to each other, for the English know no Irish, while only a few of the Irish know English. Translations went on to be one of the most translated and staged of all plays in the latter 20th century, performed in Estonia, Iceland, France, Spain, Germany, Belgium, Norway, Ukraine, the Czech Republic, Hungary, and Poland, along with most of the world's English-speaking countries (including South Africa, Canada, the U.S. and Australia). It won the Christopher Ewart-Biggs Memorial Prize for 1985. Neil Jordan completed a screenplay for a film version of Translations that was never produced. Friel commented on Translations: "The play has to do with language and only language. And if it becomes overwhelmed by that political element, it is lost."

Despite growing fame and success, the 1980s is considered Friel's artistic "Gap" as he published so few original works for the stage: Translations in 1980, The Communication Cord in 1982, and Making History in 1988. Privately, Friel complained both of the work required managing Field Day (granting written and live interviews, casting, arranging tours, etc.) and of his fear that he was "trying to impose a 'Field Day' political atmosphere" on his work. However, this is also a period during which he worked on several minor projects that filled out the decade: a translation of Chekhov's Three Sisters (1981), an adaptation of Turgenev's novel Fathers and Sons (1987), an edition of Charles McGlinchey's memoirs entitled The Last of the Name for Blackstaff Press (1986), and Charles Macklin's play The London Vertigo in 1990. Friel's decision to premiere Dancing at Lughnasa at the Abbey Theatre rather than as a Field Day production initiated his evolution away from involvement with Field Day, and he formally resigned as a director in 1994.

=== 1990 – 2005 ===
Friel returned to a position of Irish theatrical dominance during the 1990s, particularly with the release of Dancing at Lughnasa at the turn of the decade. Partly modelled on The Glass Menagerie by Tennessee Williams, it is set in the late summer of 1936 and loosely based on the lives of Friel's mother and aunts who lived in Glenties, on the west coast of Donegal. Probably Friel's most successful play, it premiered at the Abbey Theatre, transferred to London's West End, and went on to Broadway. On Broadway, it won three Tony Awards in 1992, including Best Play. A film version, starring Meryl Streep, soon followed.

Friel had been thinking about writing a "Lough Derg" play for several years, and his Wonderful Tennessee (less of a critical success after its premiere in 1993 when compared to other plays from this time) portrays three couples in their failed attempt to return to a pilgrimage sit to a small island off the Ballybeg coast, though they intend to return not to revive the religious rite but to celebrate the birthday of one of their members with alcohol and culinary delicacies. Give Me Your Answer Do! premiered in 1997 and recounts the lives and careers of two novelists and friends who pursued different paths; one writing shallow, popular works, the other writing works that refuse to conform to popular tastes. After an American university pays a small fortune for the popular writer's papers, the same collector arrives to review the manuscripts of his friend. The collector prepares to announce his findings at a dinner party when the existence of two "hard-core" pornographic novels based upon the writer's daughter forces all present to reassess.

Entering his eighth decade, Friel found it difficult to maintain the writing pace that he returned to in the 1990s; indeed, between 1997 and 2003 he produced only the very short one-act plays "The Bear" (2002), "The Yalta Game" (2001), and "Afterplay" (2002), all published under the title Three Plays After (2002). The latter two plays stage Friel's continued fascination with Chekhov's work. "The Yalta Game" is concerned with Chekhov's story "The Lady with the Lapdog," "Afterplay" is an imagining of a near-romantic meeting between Andrey Prozorov of Chekhov's Three Sisters and Sonya Serebriakova of his Uncle Vanya. It has been revived several times (including being part of the Friel/Gate Festival in September 2009) and had its world premiere at the Gate Theatre in Dublin.

The most innovative work of Friel's late period is Performances (2003). A graduate researching the impact of Leoš Janáček's platonic love for Kamila Stosslova on his work playfully and passionately argues with the composer, who appears to host her at his artistic retreat more than 70 years after his death; all the while, the Alba String Quartet's players intrude on the dialogue, warm up, then perform the first two movements of Janáček's Second String Quartet in a tableau that ends the play. The Home Place (2005), focusing on the ageing Christopher Gore and the last of Friel's plays set in Ballybeg, was also his final full-scale work. Although Friel had written plays about the Catholic gentry, this is his first play directly considering the Protestant experience. In this work, he considers the first hints of the waning of Ascendancy authority during the summer of 1878, the year before Charles Stuart Parnell became president of the Land League and initiated the Land Wars. After a sold-out season at the Gate Theatre in Dublin, it transferred to London's West End on 25 May 2005, making its American premiere at the Guthrie Theater in September 2007.

== List of works ==
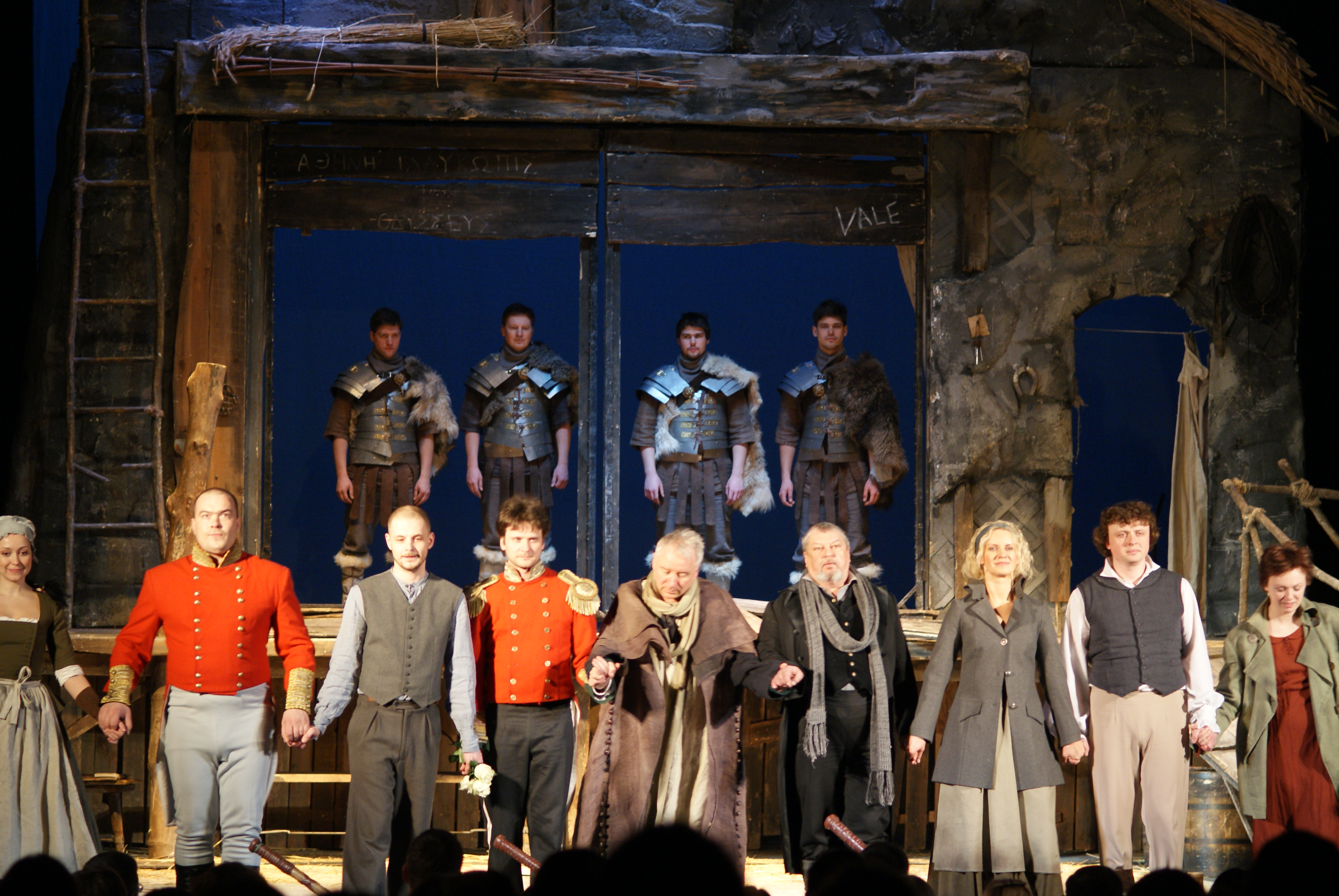
Translations on stage in Minsk

=== Plays ===
- A Doubtful Paradise (unpublished, 1960)
- The Enemy Within (1962)
- The Blind Mice (unpublished, 1963)
- Philadelphia, Here I Come! (1964)
- The Loves of Cass McGuire (1966)
- Lovers: Winners and Losers (1967)
- Crystal and Fox (1968)
- The Mundy Scheme (1969)
- Winners (1970)
- The Gentle Island (1971)
- The Freedom of the City (1973)
- Volunteers (1975)
- Living Quarters (1977)
- Faith Healer (1979)
- Aristocrats (1979)
- Translations (1980)
- American Welcome (7-minute one-act play, 1981)
- The Communication Cord (1982)
- Making History (1988)
- Dancing at Lughnasa (1990)
- Wonderful Tennessee (1993)
- Molly Sweeney (1994)
- Give Me Your Answer, Do! (1997)
- Afterplay (one-act play, 2002)
- Performances (70-minute one-act play, 2003)
- The Home Place (2005)

=== Plays for broadcast ===
- A Sort of Freedom (unpublished radio play, 1958)
- To This Hard House (unpublished radio play, 1958)
- The Founder Members (unpublished TV play, 1964)
- Three Fathers, Three Sons (unpublished TV play, 1964)
- Farewell to Ardstraw (unpublished BBC TV play, 1976)
- The Next Parish (unpublished BBC TV play, 1976)

=== Translations and adaptations ===
- Three Sisters (Anton Chekhov translation, 1981)
- Fathers and Sons (Ivan Turgenev adaptation, 1987)
- The London Vertigo (Charles Macklin adaptation, 1991)
- A Month in the Country (Turgenev adaptation, 1992)
- Uncle Vanya (Chekhov adaptation, 1998)
- The Yalta Game (one-act Chekhov adaptation, 2001)
- The Bear (one-act Chekhov adaptation, 2002)
- Hedda Gabler (Henrik Ibsen adaptation, 2008)

=== Non-dramatic writings ===
- The Diviner: The Best Short Stories of Brian Friel (1983)
- Essays, Diaries, Interviews, 1964–1999, ed. Christopher Murray (1999)

== Reviews ==
- Fionnlagh, Uilleam (1983), Celtic Omphalos, a review of Translations, in Hearn, Sheila G. (ed.), Cencrastus, No. 12, Spring 1983, pp. 43 & 44, ISSN 0264-0856
- Ritchie, Harry (1984), Recollecting Friel, a review of The Diviner, in Parker, Geoff (ed.), Cencrastus, No. 17, Summer 1984, p. 50, ISSN 0264-0856

== Major prizes and honours ==
In 1989, BBC Radio launched a "Brian Friel Season", a six-play series devoted to his work; he was the first living playwright to receive such an honour. In 1999 (April–August), Friel's 70th birthday was celebrated in Dublin with the Friel Festival, during which ten of his plays were staged or presented as dramatic readings throughout Dublin. A conference, National Library exhibition, film screenings, pre-show talks, and the launching of a special issue of The Irish University Review devoted to the playwright ran in conjunction with the festival. Also in 1999, The Irish Times extended him the honour of a lifetime achievement award.

On 22 February 2006, President Mary McAleese presented Friel with a gold torc in recognition of his election to the position of Saoi by his fellow members of Aosdána. On acceptance of the gold Torc, Friel quipped: "I knew that being made a Saoi, really getting this award, is extreme unction; it is a final anointment—Aosdana's last rites." Only five members of Aosdána could hold this honour at the time, and Friel joined fellow Saoithe Louis le Brocquy, Benedict Kiely, Seamus Heaney and Anthony Cronin. In August 2006, Heaney (also a friend of the Friels) who had been in attendance at the 75th birthday of Friel's wife in County Donegal, suffered a stroke on the morning after the celebration.

In November 2008, The Queen's University of Belfast announced its intention to build a new theatre complex and research centre, to be named The Brian Friel Theatre and Centre for Theatre Research. Friel attended its opening in 2009.

Friel's 80th birthday fell in 2009. The journal Irish Theatre International published a special issue to commemorate the occasion with seven articles devoted to the playwright. The Gate Theatre staged three plays (Faith Healer, The Yalta Game, and Afterplay) for several weeks in September. In the midst of the Gate's productions, the Abbey Theatre presented "A Birthday Celebration for Brian Friel," on 13 September 2009. Although not inclined to seek publicity, Friel attended the performance amid regular seating, received a cake while the audience sang "Happy Birthday," and mingled with well-wishers afterwards. The Abbey event was an evening of staged readings (excerpts from Philadelphia, Here I Come!, Translations, and Dancing at Lughnasa), the performance of Friel-specific songs and nocturnes, and readings by Thomas Kilroy and Seamus Heaney.

=== Selected awards ===
- 1988: Evening Standard Theatre Award for Best Play – Aristocrats
- 1989: New York Drama Critics Circle Award for Best Foreign Play – Aristocrats
- 1991: Laurence Olivier Award for Best Play – Dancing at Lughnasa
- 1992: New York Drama Critics Circle award for best play– Dancing at Lughnasa
- 1992: Tony Award for Best Play – Dancing at Lughnasa
- 1995: New York Drama Critics Circle Award for Best Foreign Play – Molly Sweeney
- 2006: Induction into the American Theater Hall of Fame
- 2009: UCD Ulysses Medal
- 2010: Donegal Person of the Year
- Member of the American Academy of Arts and Letters
- Member of the British Royal Society of Literature
- Member of the Irish Academy of Letters
- Visiting Writer at Magee College (1970–71 academic year)
- Honorary doctorate from Rosary College, River Forest, Illinois (1974)

== Papers ==
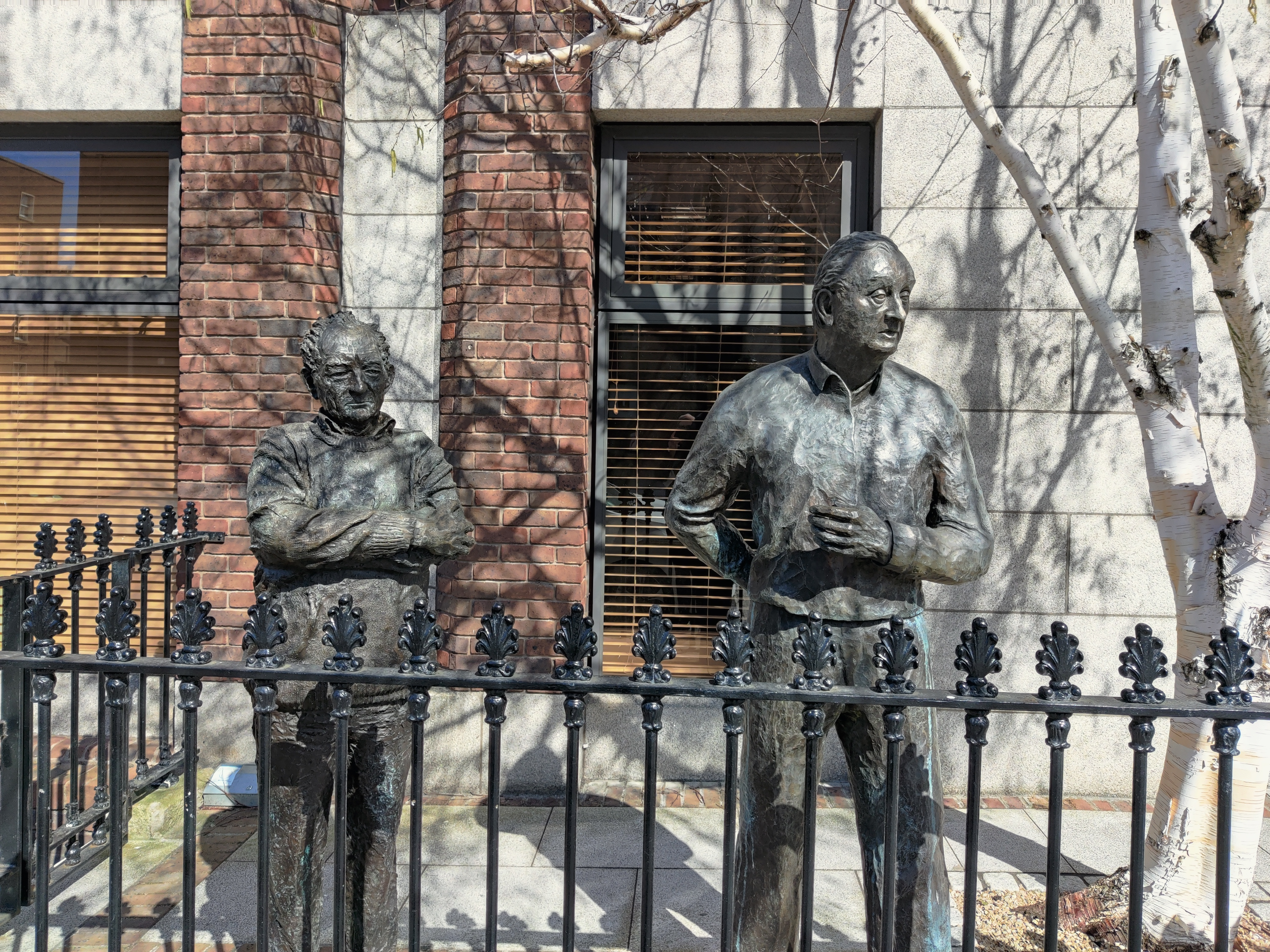
Statue of Friel (left) and John B. Keane in Dublin

The National Library of Ireland houses the 160 boxes of The Brian Friel papers, (Note: The Brian Friel papers donated to the state in 2000 are in the National Library of Ireland Manuscript Collection, List No. 73 [MSS 37,041–37,806]) containing notebooks, manuscripts, playbills, correspondence, contracts, unpublished manuscripts, programmes, production photos, articles, uncollected essays, and a vast collection of ephemera relating to Friel's career and creative process from 1959 through 2000. It does not contain his Irish Press articles, which can be found in the Dublin and Belfast newspaper libraries.

In 2011, an additional set of Friel's papers were made available in the National Library of Ireland. (Note: The Brian Friel papers donated to the state in 2011 are in the National Library of Ireland Manuscript Collection, List No. 180 [MSS 42,091 – 42,093 and MSS 49,209 – 49,350]) These additional papers consist mainly of archival materials dating between 2000 and 2010.

== See also ==
- List of Irish writers
