= Ballybeg (fictional town) =

Fictional town in Ireland

Ballybeg, an anglicisation of the Irish language name Baile Beag (IPA: [bˠalˠə bʲɔɡ]) meaning "Little Town", is a fictional town in which Irish playwright Brian Friel set many of his works. Several of Friel's plays, including Philadelphia Here I Come!, Translations and Dancing at Lughnasa, are set in the fictional County Donegal town. Friel's Ballybeg is partially based on the real village of Glenties, close to where he lived.
