= Guildhall, Derry =

Municipal Building in Derry, Northern Ireland

The Guildhall
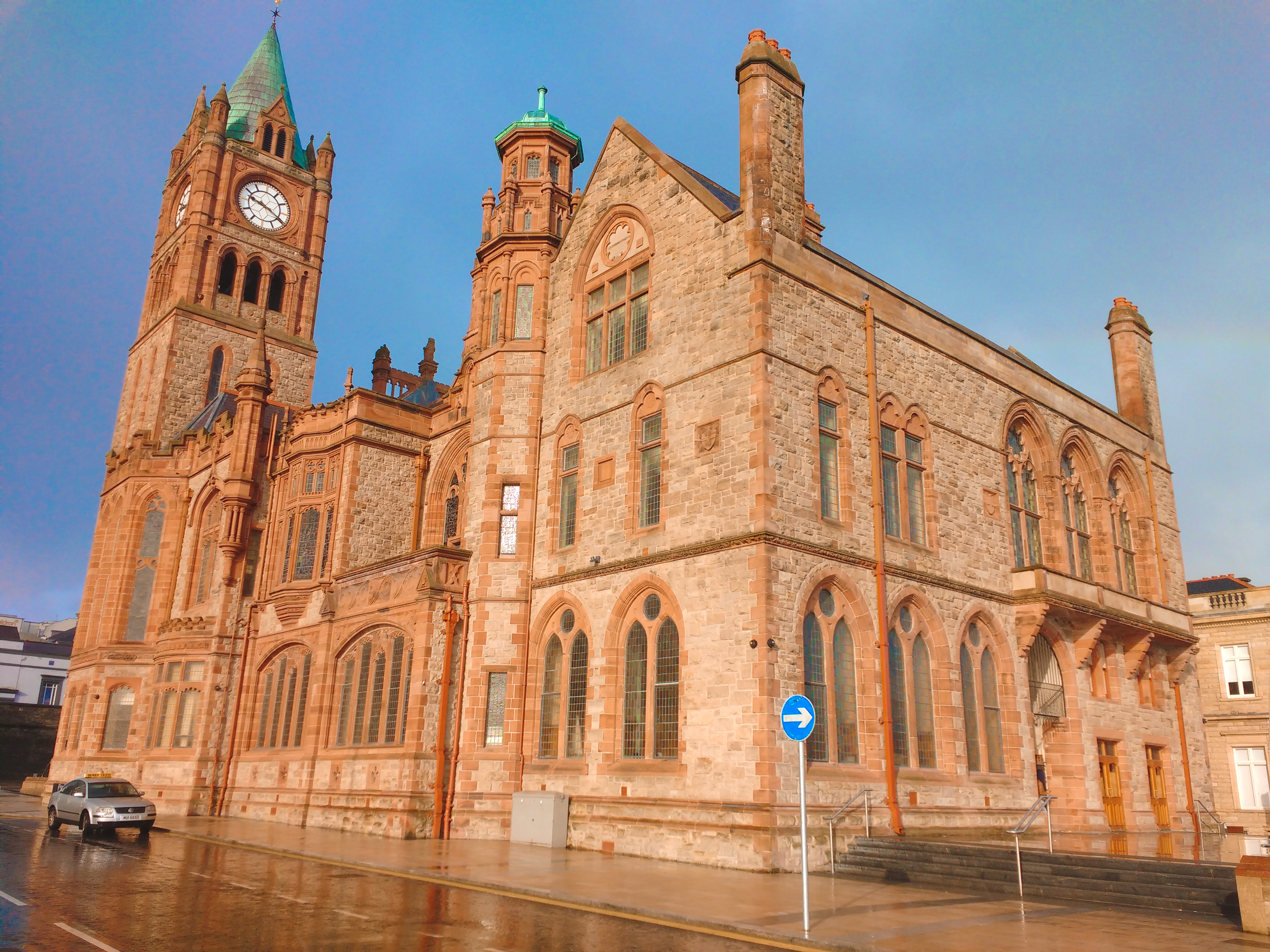
- The Guildhall, as seen from Whittaker Street.

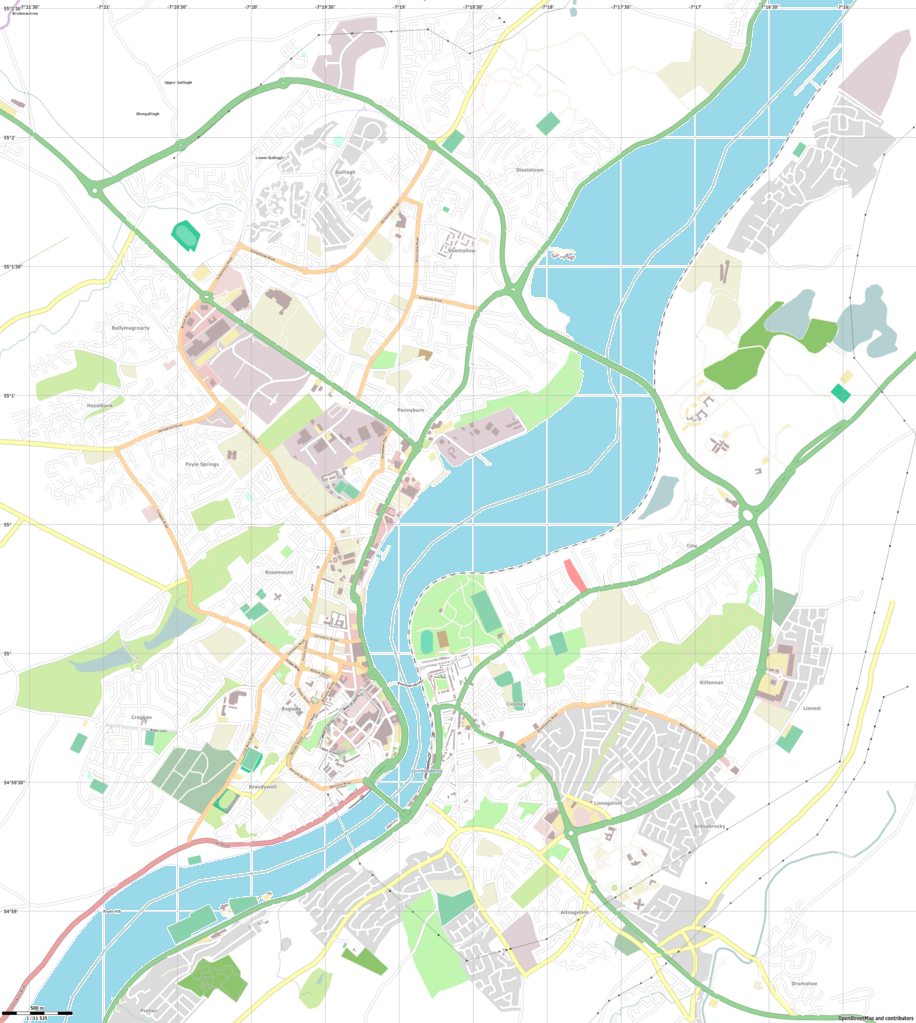
- Shown in Derry
- 54.998°N 7.320°W
- Location: Guildhall Square, Derry

History
- Built: 1890

Site notes
- Architect: John Guy Ferguson
- Architectural style: Beaux-Arts

Listed Building – Grade A
- Designated: 25 May 1976
- Reference no.: HB 01/19/038

The Guildhall in Derry, Northern Ireland, is a guildhall in which the elected members of Derry City and Strabane District Council meet. It is a Grade A listed building.

== History ==
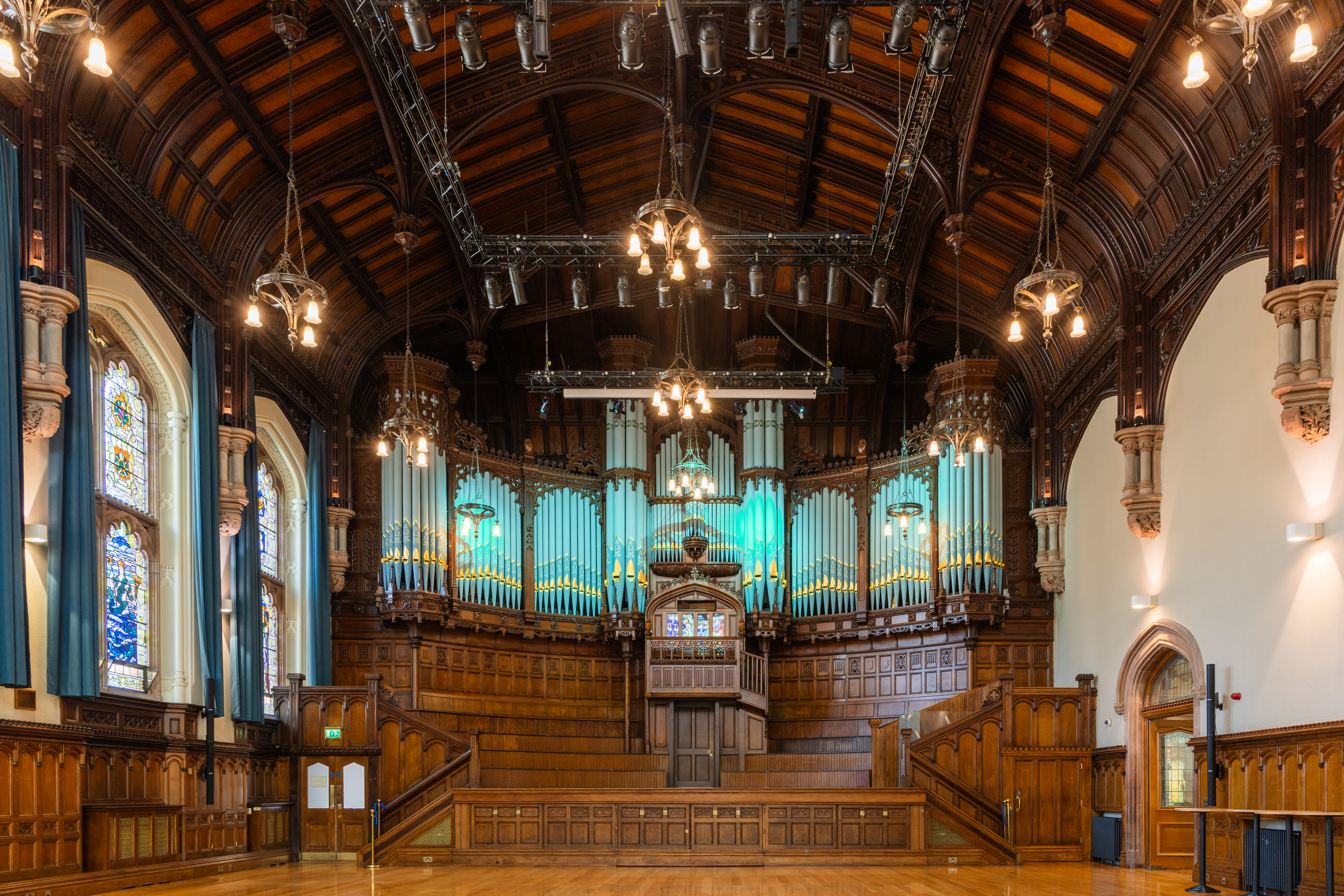
Pipe organ in the Main Hall

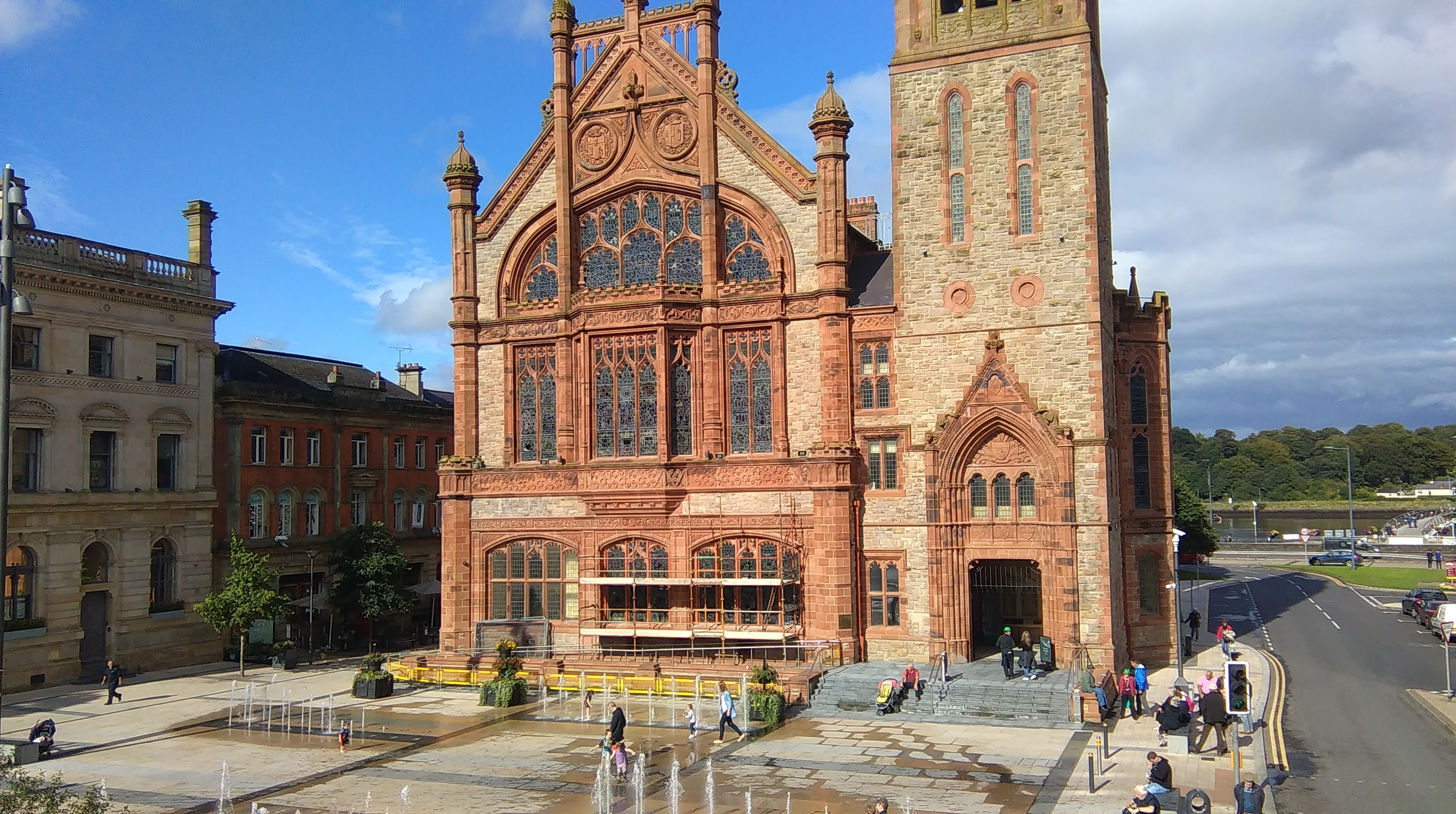
The Guildhall in August 2016

The current building was preceded by an earlier town hall called the Market House which was built in the 17th century and destroyed in the Siege of Derry in 1689. The current building, which was designed by John Guy Ferguson and financed by The Honourable The Irish Society, was completed in 1890. The design for the clock tower was modelled on the Elizabeth Tower in London.

After a disastrous fire in 1908, in which only the tower and rear block survived, and more funding from The Honourable The Irish Society, the Guildhall was rebuilt to the design of Mathew Alexander Robinson in 1912.

The organ was built by William Hill & Son to a design by Sir Walter Parratt. It has 3,132 pipes and was installed in 1914.

During The Troubles, the Guildhall was the focus of multiple terror attacks. The building was badly damaged by two bombs in 1972, but was restored at a cost of £1.7 million and reopened in 1977. On 23 September 1980 the Field Day Theatre Company presented its first production, the premiere of Brian Friel's Translations, in the Guildhall.

The Guildhall, which had been the meeting place of the county borough of Londonderry for much of the 20th century, continued to be the local seat of government after the formation of Londonderry City Council in 1972; the council was renamed Derry City Council in 1984.

The square in front of the Guildhall regularly plays host to important events and was the site of U.S. President Bill Clinton's address when he visited the city in November 1995.

The Guildhall was also home to the Saville Inquiry into the events of Bloody Sunday from 1998 to 2005.

An extensive restoration programme, undertaken by H & J Martin (the contracting firm which built Belfast City Hall) to the designs of Consarc Architects, began in August 2010. The project was completed in 2013 at a cost £8 million, and won a Regional Award from the Royal Institute of British Architects in 2014.

Following further local government reorganisation, the building became the meeting place of the enlarged Derry and Strabane City Council in 2014; the council was renamed Derry City and Strabane District Council on 24 February 2016.

== See also ==
- Tower Museum
