= 53rd Tony Awards =

1999 US theatrical awards ceremony

- Date: June 6, 1999
- Location: Gershwin Theatre, New York City, New York
- Most wins: Death of a Salesman (4)
- Most nominations: Parade (9)

Television/radio coverage
- Network: CBS

The 53rd Annual Tony Awards was broadcast by CBS from the Gershwin Theatre on June 6, 1999. "The First Ten" awards ceremony, produced in association with Thirteen/WNET New York was telecast on PBS television. The show did not have a formal host.

== Eligibility ==
Shows that opened on Broadway during the 1998–1999 season before April 30, 1999 are eligible.

Original plays

- Amy's View
- The Blue Room
- Closer
- Colin Quinn – An Irish Wake
- Getting and Spending
- I'm Still Here... Damn It!
- The Lonesome West
- More to Love
- Not About Nightingales
- Side Man
- Via Dolorosa
- The Weir

Original musicals

- Band in Berlin
- The Civil War
- An Evening with Jerry Herman
- Footloose
- Fosse
- The Gershwins' Fascinating Rhythm
- It Ain't Nothin' but the Blues
- Marlene
- Parade
- Swan Lake

Play revivals

- Death of a Salesman
- Electra
- Fool Moon
- The Iceman Cometh
- The Lion in Winter
- Night Must Fall
- Ring Round the Moon
- Twelfth Night

Musical revivals

- Annie Get Your Gun
- Little Me
- On the Town
- Peter Pan
- You're a Good Man, Charlie Brown

== The ceremony ==
The opening number was "There's No Business Like Show Business", sung by Bernadette Peters and Tom Wopat.

Presenters

- Julie Andrews
- Bea Arthur
- Alec Baldwin
- Christine Baranski
- Matthew Broderick
- Carol Burnett
- Zoe Caldwell
- Mario Cantone
- Stockard Channing
- Alan Cumming
- Judi Dench
- Brian Dennehy
- Laurence Fishburne
- Calista Flockhart
- David Hare
- William Hurt
- Swoosie Kurtz
- Angela Lansbury
- Audra McDonald
- Terrence McNally
- Sarah Jessica Parker
- David Hyde Pierce
- Chita Rivera
- Jason Robards
- Christian Slater
- Kevin Spacey
- Scott Wolf

The musicals represented were:

- The Civil War ("Freedom's Child" - Lawrence Clayton and Company)
- Peter Pan ("I'm Flying" - Cathy Rigby and children)
- Parade ("This Is Not Over Yet"/"The Old Red Hills of Home" - Carolee Carmello, Brent Carver and Company)
- You're a Good Man, Charlie Brown ("My New Philosophy"/"Happiness" - Kristin Chenoweth, Anthony Rapp and Company)
- Fosse ("Sing Sing Sing" - Company)
- Little Me ("Boom Boom" - Martin Short and Company)
- Annie Get Your Gun ("I Got the Sun in the Morning"/"Hoedown"/"Old-Fashioned Wedding" - Tom Wopat, Bernadette Peters and Company)

The telecast included a special presentation (a "collage of moments") featuring performers from several of the productions nominated as Best Play and Best Revival of a Play.

== Winners and nominees ==
Winners are in bold

Best Play	Best Musical
**Side Man – Warren Leight**; Closer – Patrick Marber; The Lonesome West – Martin McDonagh; Not About Nightingales – Tennessee Williams	**Fosse**; The Civil War; It Ain't Nothin' but the Blues; Parade
Best Revival of a Play	Best Revival of a Musical
**Death of a Salesman – Arthur Miller**; Electra – Sophocles; The Iceman Cometh – Eugene O'Neill; Twelfth Night – William Shakespeare	**Annie Get Your Gun**; Little Me; Peter Pan; You're a Good Man, Charlie Brown
Best Performance by a Leading Actor in a Play	Best Performance by a Leading Actress in a Play
**Brian Dennehy – Death of a Salesman as Willy Loman**; Brían F. O'Byrne – The Lonesome West as Valene Connor; Corin Redgrave – Not About Nightingales as Bert "Boss" Whalen; Kevin Spacey – The Iceman Cometh as Theodore Hickman	**Judi Dench – Amy's View as Esme Allen**; Stockard Channing – The Lion in Winter as Eleanor of Aquitaine; Marian Seldes – Ring Round the Moon as Madame Desmermortes; Zoë Wanamaker – Electra as Electra
Best Performance by a Leading Actor in a Musical	Best Performance by a Leading Actress in a Musical
**Martin Short – Little Me as Noble Eggleston and Various Characters**; Brent Carver – Parade as Leo Frank; Adam Cooper – Swan Lake as The Swan; Tom Wopat – Annie Get Your Gun as Frank Butler	**Bernadette Peters – Annie Get Your Gun as Annie Oakley**; Carolee Carmello – Parade as Lucille Frank; Dee Hoty – Footloose as Vi Moore; Siân Phillips – Marlene as Marlene Dietrich
Best Performance by a Featured Actor in a Play	Best Performance by a Featured Actress in a Play
**Frank Wood – Side Man as Gene**; Kevin Anderson – Death of a Salesman as Biff; Finbar Lynch – Not About Nightingales as Jim Allison; Howard Witt – Death of a Salesman as Charley	**Elizabeth Franz – Death of a Salesman as Linda**; Claire Bloom – Electra as Clytemnestra; Samantha Bond – Amy's View as Amy Thomas; Dawn Bradfield – The Lonesome West as Girleen Kelleher
Best Performance by a Featured Actor in a Musical	Best Performance by a Featured Actress in a Musical
**Roger Bart – You're a Good Man, Charlie Brown as Snoopy**; Desmond Richardson – Fosse as Various Characters; Ron Taylor – It Ain't Nothin' but the Blues as Various Characters; Scott Wise – Fosse as Various Characters	**Kristin Chenoweth – You're a Good Man, Charlie Brown as Sally Brown**; Gretha Boston – It Ain't Nothin' but the Blues as Various Characters; Valarie Pettiford – Fosse as Various Characters; Mary Testa – On the Town as Madame Maude P. Dilly
Best Book of a Musical	Best Original Score (Music and/or Lyrics) Written for the Theatre
**Alfred Uhry – Parade**; Charles Bevel, Lita Gaithers, Randal Myler, Ron Taylor and Dan Wheetman – It Ain't Nothin' but the Blues; Pam Gems – Marlene; Dean Pitchford and Walter Bobbie – Footloose	**Parade – Jason Robert Brown (music and lyrics)**; Footloose – Tom Snow (music), Dean Pitchford (lyrics), Kenny Loggins, Eric Carmen, Sammy Hagar and Jim Steinman (music and lyrics); The Civil War – Frank Wildhorn (music) and Jack Murphy (lyrics); Twelfth Night – Jeanine Tesori (music)
Best Scenic Design	Best Costume Design
**Richard Hoover – Not About Nightingales**; Bob Crowley – The Iceman Cometh; Bob Crowley – Twelfth Night; Ricardo Hernandez – Parade	**Lez Brotherston – Swan Lake**; Santo Loquasto – Fosse; John David Ridge – Ring Round the Moon; Catherine Zuber – Twelfth Night
Best Lighting Design	Best Orchestrations
**Andrew Bridge – Fosse**; Mark Henderson – The Iceman Cometh; Natasha Katz – Twelfth Night; Chris Parry – Not About Nightingales	**Ralph Burns and Douglas Besterman – Fosse**; David Cullen – Swan Lake; Don Sebesky – Parade; Harold Wheeler – Little Me
Best Direction of a Play	Best Direction of a Musical
**Robert Falls – Death of a Salesman**; Howard Davies – The Iceman Cometh; Garry Hynes – The Lonesome West; Trevor Nunn – Not About Nightingales	**Matthew Bourne – Swan Lake**; Richard Maltby, Jr. and Ann Reinking – Fosse; Michael Mayer – You're a Good Man, Charlie Brown; Harold Prince – Parade
Best Choreography	
**Matthew Bourne – Swan Lake**; Patricia Birch – Parade; Rob Marshall – Little Me; A. C. Ciulla – Footloose	

== Special awards ==
The following non-completive awards were presented:

- Regional Theater Tony Award
  - Crossroads Theatre (New Brunswick, New Jersey)
- Special Lifetime Achievement Tony Award
  - Arthur Miller
- Special Lifetime Achievement Tony Award
  - Isabelle Stevenson
- Special Lifetime Achievement Tony Award
  - Uta Hagen
- Special Tony Award For a Live Theatrical Presentation
  - Fool Moon (Bill Irwin and David Shiner)

=== Multiple nominations and awards ===
These productions had multiple nominations:

- 9 nominations: Parade
- 8 nominations: Fosse
- 6 nominations: Death of a Salesman and Not About Nightingales
- 5 nominations: The Iceman Cometh, Swan Lake and Twelfth Night
- 4 nominations: Footloose, It Ain't Nothin' but the Blues, Little Me, The Lonesome West and You're a Good Man, Charlie Brown
- 3 nominations: Annie Get Your Gun and Electra
- 2 nominations: Amy's View, The Civil War, Marlene, Ring Round the Moon and Side Man

The following productions received multiple awards.

- 4 wins: Death of a Salesman
- 3 wins: Fosse and Swan Lake
- 2 wins: Annie Get Your Gun, Parade, Side Man and You're a Good Man, Charlie Brown

== See also ==
- Drama Desk Awards
- 1999 Laurence Olivier Awards – equivalent awards for West End theatre productions
- Obie Award
- New York Drama Critics' Circle
- Theatre World Award
- Lucille Lortel Awards
