= List of awards and nominations received by Martin McDonagh =

Martin McDonagh awards and nominations
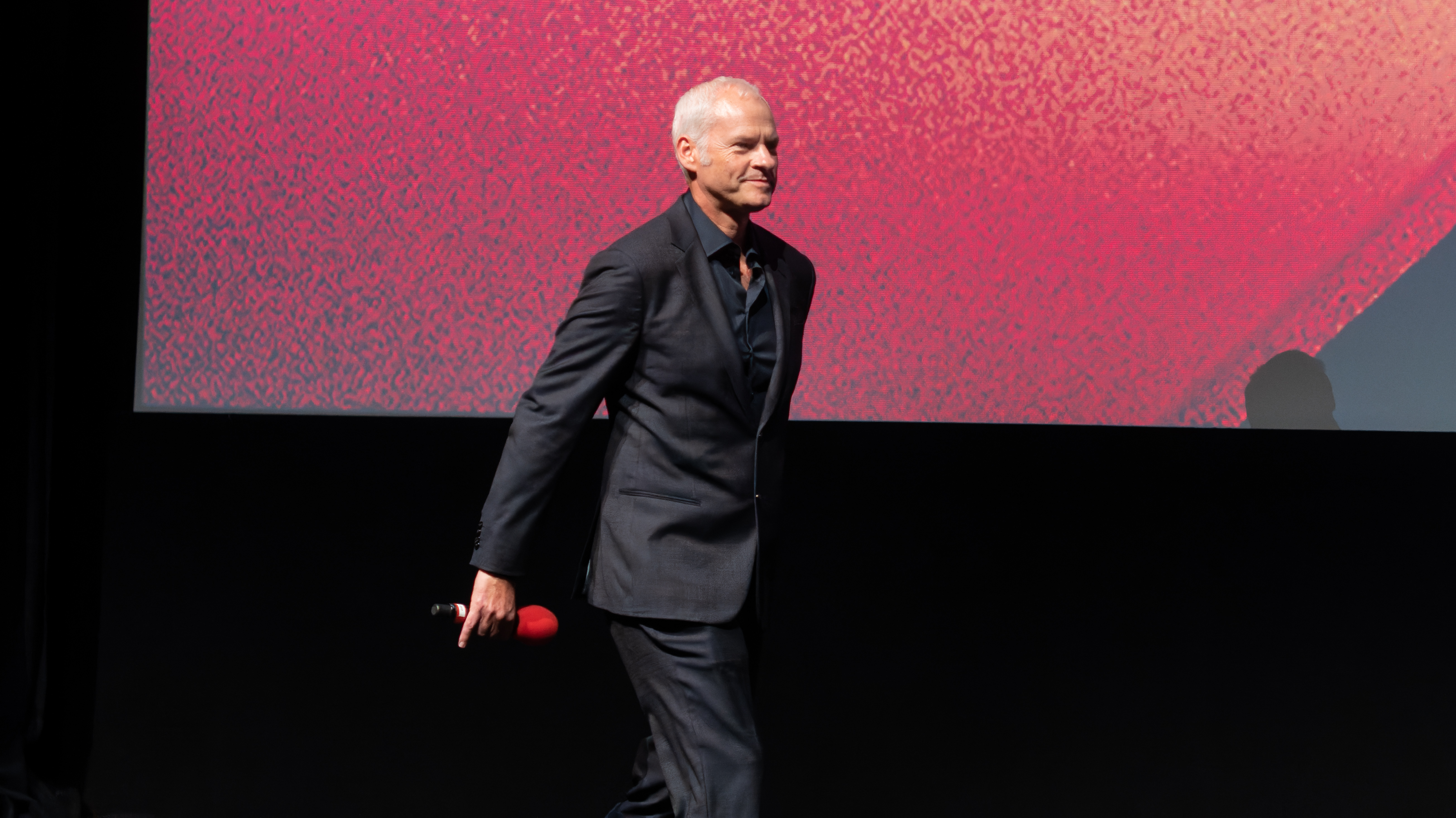
Awards and nominations
Award	Wins	Nominations
Academy Awards	1	7
BAFTA Awards	6	12
Golden Globe Awards	2	4
Laurence Olivier Awards	3	5
Tony Awards	0	5

Totals (Note: Certain award groups do not simply award one winner. They acknowledge several different recipients, have runners-up, and have third place. Since this is a specific recognition and is different from losing an award, runner-up mentions are considered wins in this award tally. For simplification and to avoid errors, each award in this list has been presumed to have had a prior nomination.)
- Wins: 32
- Nominations: 67

This is a list of awards and nominations received by Martin McDonagh.

Martin McDonagh is a British-Irish (Note: Born in London to Irish parents, McDonagh holds only an Irish citizenship.) playwright and filmmaker. Known for his work on stage and screen, he has received various accolades including an Academy Award, six BAFTAs, two Golden Globe Awards, and three Laurence Olivier Awards, in addition to nominations for five Tony Awards, four Critics' Choice Movie Awards, two Independent Spirit Awards.

As a filmmaker, McDonagh first gained attention for his short film Six Shooter (2004), which won the Academy Award for Best Live Action Short Film as well as a nomination for the BAFTA Award for Best Short Film. He then directed his first feature length film, the black comedy crime thriller In Bruges (2008) which won the BAFTA Award for Best Original Screenplay, the British Independent Film Award – The Douglas Hickox Award and the Evening Standard British Film Award for Best Screenplay and was nominated for the Academy Award for Best Original Screenplay. He directed his sophomore film, the satirical crime dramedy Seven Psychopaths (2012), for which he was nominated for the BAFTA Award for Outstanding British Film, the Independent Spirit Award for Best Screenplay, and the Evening Standard British Film Peter Sellers Award for Comedy.

McDonagh gained widespread notoriety for his third film, the crime drama-mystery thriller Three Billboards Outside Ebbing, Missouri (2017) which won three BAFTA Awards (for Best British Film, Best Film, and Best Original Screenplay) and two Golden Globe Awards (for Best Motion Picture – Drama and Best Screenplay – Motion Picture) as well as nominations for two Academy Awards (for Best Picture and Best Original Screenplay). He also gained critical attention for his fourth film, the black tragicomedy The Banshees of Inisherin (2022), which won two BAFTA Awards (for Best British Film, and Best Original Screenplay) and two Golden Globe Awards (for Best Motion Picture – Musical or Comedy and Best Screenplay – Motion Picture) as well as nominations for three Academy Awards (for Best Picture, Best Director, and Best Original Screenplay).

On the West End stage, he won three Laurence Olivier Awards, his first for Best New Comedy for the black comedy The Lieutenant of Inishmore in 2003 followed by wins for Best New Play for The Pillowman in 2003, and Hangmen in 2016. He received Olivier-nominations for the dramatic play The Beauty Queen of Leenane in 1996 and A Skull in Connemara in 1998. He was one of the recipients of the Europe Prize Theatrical Realities awarded to the Royal Court Theatre in 1999 (with Sarah Kane, Mark Ravenhill, Jez Butterworth, Conor McPherson). On the Broadway stage, hee has been nominated for four Tony Awards for Best Play for The Beauty Queen of Leenane in 1998, The Lonesome West in 1999, The Pillowman in 2005, and The Lieutenant of Inishmore in 2006. He has also received a Drama Desk Award win out of three nominations.

== Major associations ==
=== Academy Awards ===
Year	Category	Nominated work	Result	Ref.
2005	Best Live Action Short Film	Six Shooter	Won	
2008	Best Original Screenplay	In Bruges	Nominated	
2017	Best Picture	Three Billboards Outside Ebbing, Missouri	Nominated	
2017	Best Original Screenplay	Three Billboards Outside Ebbing, Missouri	Nominated	
2022	Best Picture	The Banshees of Inisherin	Nominated	
2022	Best Director	The Banshees of Inisherin	Nominated	
2022	Best Original Screenplay	The Banshees of Inisherin	Nominated	

=== BAFTA Awards ===
Year	Category	Nominated work	Result	Ref.
British Academy Film Awards
2005	Best Short Film	Six Shooter	Nominated	
2008	Outstanding British Film	In Bruges	Nominated	
2008	Best Original Screenplay	In Bruges	Won	
2012	Outstanding British Film	Seven Psychopaths	Nominated	
2017	Best Film	Three Billboards Outside Ebbing, Missouri	Won	
2017	Outstanding British Film	Three Billboards Outside Ebbing, Missouri	Won	
2017	Best Direction	Three Billboards Outside Ebbing, Missouri	Nominated	
2017	Best Original Screenplay	Three Billboards Outside Ebbing, Missouri	Won	
2022	Best Film	The Banshees of Inisherin	Nominated	
2022	Outstanding British Film	The Banshees of Inisherin	Won	
2022	Best Direction	The Banshees of Inisherin	Nominated	
2022	Best Original Screenplay	The Banshees of Inisherin	Won	

=== Critics' Choice Awards ===
Year	Category	Nominated work	Result	Ref.
Critics' Choice Movie Awards
2017	Best Director	Three Billboards Outside Ebbing, Missouri	Nominated	
2017	Best Original Screenplay	Three Billboards Outside Ebbing, Missouri	Nominated	
2022	Best Director	The Banshees of Inisherin	Nominated	
2022	Best Original Screenplay	The Banshees of Inisherin	Nominated	

=== Golden Globe Awards ===
Year	Category	Nominated work	Result	Ref.
2018	Best Director – Motion Picture	Three Billboards Outside Ebbing, Missouri	Nominated	
2018	Best Screenplay – Motion Picture	Three Billboards Outside Ebbing, Missouri	Won	
2023	Best Director – Motion Picture	The Banshees of Inisherin	Nominated	
2023	Best Screenplay – Motion Picture	The Banshees of Inisherin	Won	

=== Laurence Olivier Award ===
Year	Category	Nominated work	Result	Ref.
1997	Best New Play	The Beauty Queen of Leenane	Nominated	
1998	Best New Comedy	A Skull in Connemara	Nominated	
2003	Best New Comedy	The Lieutenant of Inishmore	Won	
2004	Best New Play	The Pillowman	Won	
2016	Best New Play	Hangmen	Won	

=== Tony Award ===
Year	Category	Nominated work	Result	Ref.
1998	Best Play	The Beauty Queen of Leenane	Nominated	
1999	Best Play	The Lonesome West	Nominated	
2005	Best Play	The Pillowman	Nominated	
2006	Best Play	The Lieutenant of Inishmore	Nominated	
2022	Best Play	Hangmen	Nominated	

== Miscellaneous awards ==
Organizations	Year	Category	Work	Result	Ref.
BFI London Film Festival	2012	Best Film	Seven Psychopaths	Nominated	
British Independent Film Awards	2008	Douglas Hickox Award	In Bruges	Nominated	
British Independent Film Awards	2017	Best Director	Three Billboards Outside Ebbing, Missouri	Nominated	
British Independent Film Awards	2017	Best Screenplay	Three Billboards Outside Ebbing, Missouri	Nominated	
Capri Hollywood International Film Festival	2017	Best Original Screenplay	Three Billboards Outside Ebbing, Missouri	Won	
Cork Film Festival	2004	Best First Short by an Irish Director	Six Shooter	Won	
Directors Guild of America Awards	2018	Outstanding Directing – Feature Film	Three Billboards Outside Ebbing, Missouri	Nominated	
Directors Guild of America Awards	2023	Outstanding Directing – Feature Film	The Banshees of Inisherin	Nominated	
Edgar Award	2009	Best Motion Picture Screenplay	In Bruges	Won	
Evening Standard British Film Awards	2009	Best Screenplay	In Bruges	Won	
Evening Standard British Film Awards	2013	Peter Sellers Award for Comedy	Seven Psychopaths	Nominated	
Flanders Film Festival	2017	Best Film	Three Billboards Outside Ebbing, Missouri	Nominated	
Filmfest Hamburg	2017	Sichtwechsel Film Award	Three Billboards Outside Ebbing, Missouri	Nominated	
Foyle Film Festival	2004	Best Irish Short	Six Shooter	Won	
Gotham Awards	2022	Best International Feature	The Banshees of Inisherin	Pending	
Gotham Awards	2026	Best Screenplay	Wild Horse Nine	Pending	
Independent Spirit Awards	2013	Best Screenplay	Seven Psychopaths	Nominated	
Independent Spirit Awards	2018	Best Screenplay	Three Billboards Outside Ebbing, Missouri	Nominated	
Leuven Short Film Festival	2004	Audience Award	Six Shooter	Won	
Producers Guild of America Awards	2018	Best Theatrical Motion Picture	Three Billboards Outside Ebbing, Missouri	Nominated	
Producers Guild of America Awards	2023	Best Theatrical Motion Picture	The Banshees of Inisherin	Nominated	
Saturn Award	2013	Best Writing	Seven Psychopaths	Nominated	
San Sebastián Film Festival	2017	Audience Award	Three Billboards Outside Ebbing, Missouri	Won	
Stockholm International Film Festival	2008	Bronze Horse	In Bruges	Nominated	
Stockholm International Film Festival	2018	Audience Award	Three Billboards Outside Ebbing, Missouri	Won	
Toronto International Film Festival	2012	People's Choice Best Midnight Madness Film	Seven Psychopaths	Won	
Toronto International Film Festival	2017	People's Choice Award	Three Billboards Outside Ebbing, Missouri	Won	
Venice Film Festival	2017	Golden Lion	Three Billboards Outside Ebbing, Missouri	Nominated	
Venice Film Festival	2017	Golden Osella for Best Screenplay	Three Billboards Outside Ebbing, Missouri	Won	
Venice Film Festival	2022	Golden Lion	The Banshees of Inisherin	Nominated	
Venice Film Festival	2022	Golden Osella for Best Screenplay	The Banshees of Inisherin	Won	
Zurich Film Festival	2017	Best International Feature Film	Three Billboards Outside Ebbing, Missouri	Nominated	

== Critics awards ==
Organizations	Year	Category	Work	Result	Ref.
Boston Society of Film Critics	2008	Best New Filmmaker	In Bruges	Won	
Chicago Film Critics Association	2008	Best Original Screenplay	In Bruges	Nominated	
Chicago Film Critics Association	2008	Most Promising Filmmaker	In Bruges	Nominated	
Film Critics Circle of Australia	2009	Best Foreign Film – English Language	In Bruges	Nominated	
Florida Film Critics Circle	2008	Pauline Kael Breakout Award	In Bruges	Won	
Irish Film & Television Awards	2005	Best Short Fiction	Six Shooter	Won	
Irish Film & Television Awards	2005	Best Breakthrough Talent	Six Shooter	Nominated	
Irish Film & Television Awards	2009	Best Script – Film	In Bruges	Won	
Irish Film & Television Awards	2009	Best Director	In Bruges	Nominated	
Irish Film & Television Awards	2013	Best Director – Film	Seven Psychopaths	Nominated	
Irish Film & Television Awards	2013	Best Script – Film	Seven Psychopaths	Nominated	
London Film Critics' Circle	2009	Breakthrough British Filmmaker	In Bruges	Nominated	
London Film Critics' Circle	2009	Screenwriter of the Year	In Bruges	Nominated	
Online Film Critics Society	2009	Best Breakthrough Filmmaker	In Bruges	Nominated	
Online Film Critics Society	2009	Best Original Screenplay	In Bruges	Nominated	
Phoenix Film Critics Society	2008	Best Screenplay Written Directly for the Screen	In Bruges	Won	
Phoenix Film Critics Society	2008	Breakout Behind the Camera	In Bruges	Won	

== Theatre awards ==
Organizations	Year	Category	Work	Result	Ref.
Critics' Circle Theatre Award	1996	Most Promising Playwright	The Beauty Queen of Leenane	Won	
Critics' Circle Theatre Award	2015	Best New Play	Hangmen	Won	
Drama Desk Award	1998	Outstanding Play	The Beauty Queen of Leenane	Won	
Drama Desk Award	2005	Outstanding Play	The Pillowman	Nominated	
Drama Desk Award	2006	Outstanding Play	The Lieutenant of Inishmore	Nominated	
Europe Theatre Prize	1999	Europe Theatre Prize	Europe Prize Theatrical Realities	Won	
New York Drama Critics' Circle Award	1998	Best Play	The Beauty Queen of Leenane	Runner-up	
New York Drama Critics' Circle Award	2005	Best Foreign Play	The Pillowman	Won	
New York Drama Critics' Circle Award	2018	Best Foreign Play	Hangmen	Won	
