= Rúaidhrí Conroy =

Irish actor

- Born: 30 November 1979 (age 45); Dublin, Ireland
- Occupation: Actor
- Years active: 1990–present

Rúaidhrí Conroy (born 30 November 1979) is an Irish actor. He is the son of actor Brendan Conroy. One of his first castings was as Tito (and not Tayto as commonly misconceived) in the 1992 film Into the West, for which he won a Young Artist Award in the Outstanding Youth Actors in a Family Foreign Film category. In 1998, Conroy received the Theatre World Award for his performance in Martin McDonagh's play, The Cripple of Inishmaan.

Conroy also appeared in another McDonagh piece, Six Shooter, which won the Academy Award for Live Action Short Film in 2006. Although invited to the 78th Academy Awards, Conroy was unable to attend due to a "passport infringement" on arrival, resulting in his being returned home.

== Filmography ==
=== Film ===
Year	Title	Role	Notes
1990	Fools of Fortune	Little Edy	
1991	Hear My Song	Grandson Ryan	
1992	Into the West	Tito	
1994	Moondance	Dominic	
1995	Clockwork Mice	Conrad	
1995	Nothing Personal	Tommy	
1996	The Van	Kevin	
1997	The Serpent's Kiss	Physician's Assistant	
2000	When the Sky Falls	Jamie Thornton	
2002	Hart's War	Cpl. D.F. Lisko	
2002	Deathwatch	Pvt. Colin Chevasse	
2004	Six Shooter	Kid	Short
2009	Swansong: Story of Occi Byrne	Ned Foley	
2017	Pilgrimage	Brother Rua	
2019	The Professor and the Madman	Declan Reilly	

=== Television ===
Year	Title	Role	Notes
1996	Kavanagh QC	Paul Warwick	Episode: "A Sense of Loss"
2006	Stardust	Jimmy	2 episodes
2007	My Boy Jack	McHugh	Television film
2008	Raw	Johnny	2 episodes
2010	Jack Taylor	Mikey	Episode: "Shot Down"
2011	Garrow's Law	Ciaran Quinn	Episode #3.2
2012	Treasure Island	John Hunter	Television film
2016	Trial of the Century	Private Daniel Bailey	Episode: "The Prosecution of Patrick H. Pearse"
2018	Taken Down	Cossie	Episode: "Episode 4"

== Theatre credits ==
- 1998 – Public Theater, New York production of The Cripple of Inishmaan – Billy (Lead)
- 1997 – Royal National Theatre production of The Cripple of Inishmaan – Billy (Lead)
- 1999 – Druid Theatre Company (Irish Tour) production of The Country Boy – Lead
- 2000 – DRUID Theatre Company at Gaiety Theatre production of The Beauty Queen of Leenane – Ray
- 2004 – ART NI production of Philadelphia, Here I Come! – "Public" Gar

== Awards ==
- 1993 – Young Artist Award: Outstanding Youth Actors in a Family Foreign Film
- 1998 – Theatre World Award
