= How Many Miles to Babylon? (novel) =

1974 novel by Jennifer Johnston

- First edition
- Author: Jennifer Johnston
- Language: English
- Subject: First World War
- Publisher: Hamish Hamilton (UK); Doubleday (US)
- Publication date: 1974
- Publication place: Ireland
- Pages: 156
- ISBN: 0-241-02487-0

How Many Miles to Babylon? is a novel by Irish writer Jennifer Johnston, first published in 1974. The novel explores the relationship between two men, an Anglo-Irish aristocrat, Alexander Moore, and a lower-class son of a labourer on his lands, Jerry, as they experience the First World War.

== Synopsis ==
The story is the complex tale of a friendship between two boys in Ireland before and during World War I. Alec, the son of Anglo-Irish parents, grows up lonely and friendless on his parents' estate in Wicklow during the early 20th century. His parents have a difficult relationship, and it is stated that "their only meeting place was the child." He meets a local boy, Jerry, who shares his passion for horses. Alec's mother, who believes strongly in the class system of early twentieth-century Ireland, discovers the friendship and forbids him from spending any more time with Jerry. Their friendship is thereafter conducted in private until the outbreak of the First World War. Jerry signs up as his father is already in the British Army, and the King's Shilling would greatly benefit his mother. Alec feels no compulsion to sign up until his mother tells him that his father, Fredrick, is not his biological father, and in that moment, he is so frustrated with his mother that he impulsively signs up. In France, the two friends are stationed together, but now divided by rank and class. Their only other friend in the army is Bennett, an officer with socialist ideas. They are commanded by Major Glendinning, a ruthless officer who shares Alec's mother's belief in the class system and divisions between rank, demanding that there be 'no flaw in the machinery'. Eventually, Jerry finds out that his father is missing, and leaves to find out what has happened to him. During Jerry's disappearance, Bennett gets sick and is brought away for medical attention. Jerry returns soon after, having discovered that his father is dead, but he is arrested for desertion. Glendinning commands that Alec command the firing squad that will shoot and kill Jerry. Instead, Alec has a final talk with Jerry before shooting Jerry himself, at which point he is imprisoned and sentenced to death.

== Style and literary devices ==
The novel has a complex and lyrical style. Critique Philip Womack described Johnston as effectively using "oblique speech, knotty lyricism and careful description" to depict the chaotic environment created by war.

The novel also includes small abstracts from poetry and songs. The novel's title is derived from a traditional nursery Rhyme, How Many Miles to Babylon?:

How many miles to Babylon?
Four score and ten, sir.
Will I get there by candlelight?
Yes and back again, sir.

== Reception ==
When re-reviewing the novel in 2011, Philip Womack described the novel as "slim but emotionally hefty." For Womack, it's a poignant retelling of how the First World War erased lines of class, and its emotional toil: "Johnston's novel conveys both the insanity of war and the poignancy of unspoken tenderness."

== Film, TV or theatrical adaptations ==
In 1982, it was adapted for television by the BBC, starring Daniel Day-Lewis as Alec and Christopher Fairbank as Jerry.

In 2005, the actor and director Alan Stanford adapted the novel for the stage. Second Age Theatre Company produced it and was directed by David Parnell. Subsequently, the play has been performed several times.

The book featured as the Book at Bedtime on BBC Radio 4 in April 2013.

== Characters ==
- Alexander Moore (Alec)
- Jeremiah Crowe (Jerry)
- Alec's mother (Alicia)
- Alec's father (Fredrick)
- The piano teacher (Mr. Cave)

=== In the Army ===
- Major Glendinning
- Sergeant O'Keefe
- Sergeant Barry
- Bennett (officer)
- Cillian (the king)
