= The Pillowman =

Martin McDonagh play

- Original language: English
- Written by: Martin McDonagh
- Characters: Katurian; Tupolski; Ariel; Michal
- Genre: Black comedy

Premiere
- Date: 13 November 2003
- Place: Cottesloe Theatre; London, England

The Pillowman is a 2003 play by Martin McDonagh. It received its first public reading in an early version at the Finborough Theatre, London, in 1995, also a final and completed version of the play was publicly read in 1998 and then finished and released as a book in some places in 1999. Production started in 2000 for the eventual 2003 performance. It tells the tale of Katurian, a fiction writer living in a police state, who is interrogated about the gruesome content of his short stories and their similarities to a number of bizarre child murders occurring in his town. The play received the 2004 Olivier Award for Best New Play, the 2004-5 New York Drama Critics' Circle Award for Best New Foreign Play, and two Tony Awards for production. It was nominated for the 2004 Evening Standard Award for Best New Play.

== Summary ==
Katurian, a writer of short stories that often depict violence against children, has been arrested by two detectives, Ariel and Tupolski, because some of his stories resemble recent child murders. When he hears that his brother Michal has confessed to the murders and implicated Katurian, he resigns himself to being executed but attempts to save his stories from destruction. The play contains both narrations and reenactments of several of Katurian's stories, including the autobiographical "The Writer and the Writer's Brother", which tells how Katurian developed his disturbed imagination by hearing the sounds of Michal being tortured by their parents.

== Cast and characters ==
Characters	National Theatre (2003)	Broadway debut (2005)	West End revival (2023)
Katurian	David Tennant	Billy Crudup	Lily Allen
Tupolski	Jim Broadbent	Jeff Goldblum	Steve Pemberton
Ariel	Nigel Lindsay	Željko Ivanek	Paul Kaye
Michal	Adam Godley	Michael Stuhlbarg	Matthew Tennyson

Katurian
A writer of gruesome short stories often involving children. His disturbed imagination was the result of having heard his brother being abused when they were younger. Consequently, he killed his parents and looked after his brother. He is shocked by his arrest.
Michal
Katurian's brother, who is "slow to get things" following his years of abuse at the hands of his parents. He is also taken into jail along with Katurian.
Tupolski
The lead detective and the "good cop" in the interrogation. Cold and uncaring, he sees himself as detached from the people he aims to save, shocking his younger partner Ariel.
Ariel
A brutal and violent detective who has a vendetta against anyone who commits crimes against children because of abuse in his own past. He ends up being more sympathetic toward Katurian and his stories than Tupolski is.
Father and Mother
The parents of the young Katurian in "The Writer and The Writer's Brother," and the parents/foster parents of the girl in "The Little Jesus."
A Boy and a Girl
The protagonists of "The Writer and The Writer's Brother" and "The Little Jesus" respectively.

== Plot ==
=== Act I ===
Ariel and Tupolski interrogate Katurian in a police room, adopting a good cop/bad cop routine with Ariel happily playing the bad cop. At first Katurian does not know why he is being questioned, and thinks he is under suspicion of running political messages against the totalitarian dictatorship through his stories. The detectives and Katurian discuss grisly stories involving children. Ariel leaves the room, and soon after Michal is heard screaming in the next room. Ariel returns, his hand covered in blood from apparently torturing Michal, and tells Katurian that Michal has just confessed to killing three children, in association with Katurian. The first two children were murdered according to the patterns of the stories "The Little Apple Men" and "The Tale of the Town on the River." Katurian denies the allegations, stating that although his stories are gruesome it is the job of a storyteller to tell a story.

In his own narrative, Katurian describes being raised by loving parents who encouraged him to write, and for many years he wrote very happy stories. However, at night he began to hear sounds of torture from the next room, and as a result he began to write more disturbing stories. One night, a note is slipped under the door, claiming that Katurian's brother has been tortured nightly for seven years as part of an artistic experiment to get Katurian to become a great writer. Katurian breaks down the door, only to find his parents, who were playing a trick on him, pretending to be torturing a child. However, when Katurian returns years later, he discovers his brother's dead body hidden under the mattress, clutching the manuscript of a beautiful story, better than any of Katurian's, which Katurian burns. Katurian interrupts his narrative to say that this ending was fabricated when he wrote the story: when he broke down the door, he found Michal still alive. Katurian smothered his parents with a pillow that very night in vengeance for his disabled brother and the abuse he suffered.

=== Act II ===
Katurian and Michal are together in a cell, Katurian just having been tortured. Michal reveals that he had not been tortured, but rather cooperated entirely with Ariel, even screaming when Ariel asked him to. At Michal's request, Katurian tells him the story of "The Pillowman", about a man made of pillows who convinces children to kill themselves so they can be spared a horrible future. Michal admits to having killed the children, claiming that Katurian told him to do it through his stories. Michal says that he murdered the third child after hearing Katurian's story "The Little Jesus", one of his most violent. Michal tells Katurian that he had read the written version of "The Writer and the Writer's Brother", and resented the changes from their lives, wishing that Katurian had written a happy ending for the two brothers. Katurian lulls Michal to sleep by telling him one of his happier stories, "The Little Green Pig", then smothers him to save him the pain of being executed. Katurian calls to the detectives, announcing his intention to confess to the crimes on the condition that his stories are preserved.

Katurian tells the others the story of "The Little Jesus", which was thought to inspire the third murder. A young girl believes that she is the second coming of Jesus, and blesses unsavory characters, to the dismay of her parents and annoyance of others. When her parents are killed in a horrific accident, she is sent to live with abusive foster parents. Annoyed by her pretensions, the foster parents crucify her and bury her alive so that she might rise again in three days, but she does not.

=== Act III ===
Katurian writes out a false confession and adds the names of his mother and father to the list of people he has killed. When Katurian sees how eager Ariel is to torture him, he guesses that Ariel was sexually abused by his father. Before Ariel can begin the torture, Tupolski tells them that the third child might still be alive and Ariel leaves to find her. When Ariel returns with the girl, she is not injured but covered with green paint, revealing that Michal had not reenacted the story of "The Little Jesus" but "The Little Green Pig." It is apparent to Ariel and Tupolski that Katurian was unaware of this and therefore could not have murdered the children like he confessed, but they decide to execute him anyway for murdering his parents and vow to destroy his stories. Before Ariel can execute him, Katurian tells them about the torture Michal suffered in order for Katurian to become a better writer. Tupolski shows no empathy and states his intention to destroy the stories, before shooting Katurian in the head. Left alone with Katurian's stories, Ariel decides to preserve them.

== Katurian's stories ==
"The Little Apple Men"
Told briefly in Act 1 scene 1, and re-enacted in the first child murder. A young girl, whose father mistreats her, carves a set of little men out of apples. She gives them to her father, telling him to save them rather than eat them. He scoffs at her, and eats several. The apple has razor blades inside, which kill the father. At night the remaining apple men accuse the girl of killing their brothers, and jump down her throat to kill her.
"The Three Gibbet Crossroads"
Told in Act 1 scene 1, A man wakes up in an iron gibbet, aware that he has committed the crime he is being punished for, but unaware of what the crime was. He sees two other gibbets, one marked Murderer and the other marked Rapist. Several people come by who have sympathy for the murderer and the rapist, but express disgust for the first man after reading the sign that identifies his crime. Still ignorant of his crime, the man is shot by a highwayman.
"The Tale of the Town on the River"
Told in Act 1 scene 1, and reenacted in the second murder. A young boy, mistreated by his parents, offers a strange dark rider a piece of his meal. Touched, the rider presents him a gift: he chops off the boy's toes. The conclusion of the story relates that the rider was the Pied Piper on his way to Hamelin to take away the children. Since he crippled the boy, the latter could not keep up with the other children, and was the only child in town to survive.
"The Pillowman"
Told in Act 2 scene 1, The Pillowman visits people on the verge of suicide because of the tortured lives they have suffered. He travels back in time to the person's childhood and convinces them to commit suicide, thereby avoiding the life of suffering. This task saddens the Pillowman, however, and he decides to visit his own younger self, who readily commits suicide. This relieves the Pillowman's sadness, but also causes all the children he saved to live out their miserable lives and eventually die alone.
"The Little Green Pig"
Told in Act 2 scene 1, Katurian's most juvenile story, but also the only one devoid of violence. A green pig, who enjoys his peculiar colouring, is mocked by the other pigs. The farmers use a special permanent paint to make the pig pink just like all the others. The pig prays to God to keep his peculiarity, and can not understand why God ignored his prayers. Soon after, however, a magic green rain falls that makes all the other pigs green, and since the little pig retains his pink colour, he is once again "a little bit peculiar".
"The Little Jesus"
Reenacted in Act 2 scene 2, and originally thought to be the source for the third murder. A young girl believes that she is the second coming of Jesus, and goes about blessing unsavory characters, to the dismay of her parents and the annoyance of others. When her parents are killed in a horrific accident, she is sent to live with abusive foster parents. Annoyed with her pretensions of divinity, the foster parents complete her performance of Jesus' life by torturing her, crucifying her, and burying her alive so that she might rise again in three days. She does not, but three days later a man walks through the woods close to the girl's grave. He fails to hear the scratching of her nails on the wood on her coffin, and does not see the fresh grave because – like a man the girl tried to heal – he is blind.
"The Writer and the Writer's Brother"
This story is partially autobiographical. A boy, raised by loving parents who encouraged him to write, wrote happy stories for many years. Then, at night, he begins hearing sounds of torture from the next room, and as a result he began to write more disturbing stories. One night, a note is slipped under the door, claiming that the boy's brother has been tortured nightly for seven years as part of an artistic experiment to get the boy to become a great writer. He kicks in the door, only to find his parents, who were playing a trick on him, just pretending to be torturing a child. However, when he returns years later, he discovers his brother's dead body hidden under the mattress, clutching the manuscript of a beautiful story, better than any of his, which he burns. Later in Act 2 Katurian tells Michal that in the story, the character Michal was the true "writer" of the title, whereas his own character was merely the brother.
"The Shakespeare Room"
Michal mentions this story to illustrate the fact that Katurian's work, in general, tends to be dark and twisted. Unlike the others, it is not narrated, acted out, or summarized in great detail. Michal gives the following brief synopsis of the story: instead of being the literary genius the world thinks him to be, William Shakespeare does not pen his own plays; instead, whenever he wants something written, he jabs a little pygmy woman whom he keeps in a box and she, in turn, composes a play for him (Shakespeare takes the credit). This narrative was explored further by McDonagh in A Very Very Very Dark Matter, where Hans Christian Andersen takes the place of Shakespeare.
"The Face Basement"
An unnamed, sadistic character chops off the faces of his (undescribed) victims, puts them in a jar, and keeps them in his basement. As with "The Shakespeare Room", this story is mentioned by Michal only in passing.

== Inspiration ==
The Pillowman stemmed in part from McDonagh's experience composing fairy tales, with names such as "The Chair and the Wolfboy", "The Short Fellow and the Strange Frog", and "The Violin and the Drunken Angel", early in his writing career. Attempting to rewrite fairy tales he remembered from childhood, he realized that "there's something dark about them that doesn't quite come through." In a conversation with Irish drama critic Fintan O'Toole in BOMB Magazine in 1998, McDonagh retold the Brothers Grimm version of Little Red Riding Hood. The wolf's stomach is filled with rocks and sewn with green wire, leading to the wolf's death. McDonagh's comment – "I would love to write something as horrific as that if I could" – indicates a potential inspiration for the story "The Little Apple Men" in The Pillowman.

== Music ==
The original London and Broadway productions of the show featured music composed by Paddy Cunneen.

== Production history ==
The play received its first public reading in an early version at the Finborough Theatre, London, in 1995 in a season that included Shopping and Fucking by Mark Ravenhill. It premiered on 13 November 2003 at the Royal National Theatre, directed by John Crowley. The original production starred David Tennant as Katurian, Jim Broadbent as Tupolski, Nigel Lindsay as Ariel and Adam Godley as Michal

The play opened on Broadway on 10 April 2005 at the Booth Theatre and closed on 18 September 2005. Directed by John Crowley, the cast included Billy Crudup as Katurian, Michael Stuhlbarg as Michal, and Jeff Goldblum as Tupolski.

The play was revived from 10 June 2023 to 2 September 2023 at the Duke of York's Theatre in London's West End, directed by Matthew Dunster.

- Lily Allen - Katurian
- Steve Pemberton – Tupolski
- Paul Kaye – Ariel
- Matthew Tennyson - Michal
- Rebecca Lee - Mother
- Daniel Millar - Father

== Awards and nominations ==
=== Original Broadway production ===
Year	Award ceremony	Category	Nominee	Result
2005	Tony Award	Best Play	Martin McDonagh	Nominated
2005	Tony Award	Best Performance by a Leading Actor in a Play	Billy Crudup	Nominated
2005	Tony Award	Best Performance by a Featured Actor in a Play	Michael Stuhlbarg	Nominated
2005	Tony Award	Best Direction of a Play	John Crowley	Nominated
2005	Tony Award	Best Scenic Design of a Play	Scott Pask	Won
2005	Tony Award	Best Lighting Design of a Play	Brian MacDevitt	Won
2005	Drama Desk Award	Outstanding Play	Martin McDonagh	Nominated
2005	Drama Desk Award	Outstanding Featured Actor in a Play	Michael Stuhlbarg	Won
2005	Drama Desk Award	Outstanding Featured Actor in a Play	Jeff Goldblum	Nominated
2005	Drama Desk Award	Outstanding Sound Design	Paul Arditti	Won
2005	Outer Critics Circle Award	Outstanding New Broadway Play		Nominated
2005	Outer Critics Circle Award	Outstanding Actor in a Play	Billy Crudup	Nominated
2005	Outer Critics Circle Award	Outstanding Featured Actor in a Play	Jeff Goldblum	Won
2005	Outer Critics Circle Award	Outstanding Director of a Play	John Crowley	Nominated
2005	Outer Critics Circle Award	Outstanding Scenic Design	Scott Pask	Nominated
2005	Outer Critics Circle Award	Outstanding Lighting Design	Brian MacDevitt	Nominated
2005	Drama League Award	Distinguished Production of a Play		Nominated
2005	New York Drama Critic's Circle Award	Best Foreign Play	Martin McDonagh	Won

== See also ==
- Closet Land
