= Second Age Theatre Company =

Second Age Theatre Company existed to promote an awareness and love of classical theatre for all, but especially young people and new audiences for Shakespeare in Ireland.

== History of the company ==
Second Age Theatre Company was established in 1989 by Alan Stanford, Ronan Smith, Brian O'Donoghue and Martin Drury as a response to the demand from Second Level schools for a dedicated production company to present curriculum based texts, especially those of William Shakespeare. At that time, ad hoc productions were occasionally staged but of an uneven quality and at irregular intervals. It was felt by the company founders that something more permanent was required and offering a more complete package to the students. Thereafter Second Age offered regular productions of the major texts for study and in a time frame suited to the study programme of the schools. Second Age focused on producing Shakespeare and contemporary Irish classics for young audiences with particular emphasis on the plays being studied by Second Level Leaving Certificate students. As well as performing in Dublin, the company toured throughout Ireland at least once a year. Between 1989 and 2013 well over half a million second level students gained their first experience of serious professional theatre and of Shakespeare at a Second Age production. In addition, the company built a considerable following among theatre audiences for its productions and was a regular feature of the Irish theatre circuit.

== Productions ==
Shakespeare repertoire

The writer at the heart of Second Age's repertoire was always Shakespeare. The company’s primary production in January/February was always the play set for study in fifth year for senior cycle studies. This tended to work on a four-year cycle of Hamlet, King Lear, Macbeth and Othello. In addition the company has presented at various times, productions of Romeo and Juliet, As You Like It and The Merchant of Venice. Each time the cycle is re-visited a brand new production is created for that year.

Other plays

Other plays on the Leaving Certificate syllabus were also staged when time and resources permitted, and included, The Plough and the Stars, The Playboy of the Western World, Philadelphia, Here I Come! and How Many Miles to Babylon.

== Performance History ==
- As You Like It: 1989
- Othello: 1990
- Macbeth: 1990
- Playboy of the Western World: 1991
- Hamlet: 1991
- King Lear: 1992
- The Plough and the Stars: 1993
- Othello: 1993
- The Merchant of Venice: 1994
- Macbeth: 1994
- Hamlet: 1995
- The Field: 1996
- King Lear: 1996
- The Merchant of Venice: 1997
- Othello: 1997
- Romeo and Juiliet: 1998
- Macbeth: 1998
- Hamlet: 1999
- King Lear: 2001
- Macbeth: 2002
- Romeo and Juilet: 2002
- Macbeth: 2003
- Hamlet: 2004
- King Lear: 2005
- How Many Miles to Babylon?: 2006
- Macbeth: 2006
- How Many Miles to Babylon?: 2006
- Othello: 2007
- Philadelphia, Here I Come!: 2007
- Macbeth: 2008
- King Lear: 2009
- Hamlet: 2010
- Dancing at Lughnasa: 2010
- Hamlet: 2011
- Macbeth: 2012
- Romeo and Juliet: 2013
- Othello: 2013
