= Pam Gems =

British playwright

- Born: Iris Pamela Price; 1 August 1925 Hampshire, England, United Kingdom
- Died: 13 May 2011 (aged 85) London, England, United Kingdom
- Occupation: Playwright
- Language: English
- Genre: Theatre
- Spouse: Keith Gems (m. 1949)
- Children: 4 (including son Jonathan Gems)

Pam Gems (née Iris Pamela Price; 1 August 1925 – 13 May 2011) was an English playwright. The author of numerous original plays, as well as of adaptations of works by European playwrights of the past, Gems is best known for the 1978 musical play Piaf.

== Personal life ==
Iris Pamela Price was born in Bransgore, Hampshire, and had her first play – a tale of goblins and elves – staged when she was eight by her fellow pupils at primary school. She studied psychology at Manchester University from which she graduated in 1949. She was in her forties when she started to write professionally. She is best known for her 1978 musical play Piaf about French singer Édith Piaf.

She was nominated for two Tony Awards: for Stanley (Best Play) in 1997, and for Marlene (Best Book of a Musical), starring Siân Phillips as Marlene Dietrich, in 1999. Gems adapted works by dramatists ranging from Henrik Ibsen, Federico García Lorca and Anton Chekhov to Marguerite Duras.

== Family ==
In 1949, she married wax model manufacturer (the family firm, Gems Wax Models, established in 1885, has supplied models to Madame Tussauds) and former architect Keith Gems; the couple had four children.

== Filmography ==
Year	Title	Role	Notes
1984	Nineteen Eighty-Four	The Washerwoman	

== List of works ==
=== Early plays (1972–1976) ===
(work, year, place first produced)

- Betty's Wonderful Christmas (1972), Cockpit Theatre, London
- My Warren And After Birthday (1973), Almost Free Theatre, London
- Miz Venus and Wild Bill (1973), Almost Free Theatre, London
- After Birthday (1973)
- The Amiable Courtship Of Miz Venus And Wild Bill (1974), Almost Free Theatre, London
- Go West Young Woman (1974), The Roundhouse, London
- Up In Sweden (1975), Haymarket, Leicester
- My Name Is Rosa Luxembourg (adaptation), (1975)
- Up In Sweden (1975)
- Rivers and Forests (adaptation), (1976)
- Dead Fish (aka Dusa, Fish, Stas And Vi, 1976), Edinburgh Festival
- Guinevere (1976), Edinburgh Festival
- The Project (1976), Soho Poly, London

=== Middle plays (1977–2000) ===
- Franz Into April (1977), ICA, London
- Queen Christina (1977), Other Place, Stratford-on-Avon
- Piaf (1978), Other Place, Stratford-on-Avon
- Ladybird, Ladybird (1979), The King's Head, Islington, London
- Sandra (1979), London
- Aunt Mary (1982), Warehouse Theatre, London
- The Treat (1982), ICA, London
- The Cherry Orchard (adaptation) (1984)
- Variety Night (1982), London
- Camille (adaptation) (1984)
- Loving Women (1984)
- The Danton Affair (1986)
- Pasionaria (1985), Playhouse Theatre, Newcastle upon Tyne
- Arther and Guinevere (1990), Edinburgh
- The Seagull (adaptation) (1991)
- The Blue Angel (1991), Other Place, Stratford-on-Avon
- Deborah's Daughter (1994), Manchester
- Ghosts (adaptation) (1994)
- Marlene (1996), Oldham
- Stanley (1996), London
- At the Window (1997)
- The Snow Palace (1998)
- Ebba (1999)

=== Late plays (2000–2009) ===
- Girabaldi, Si! (2000)
- Linderhof (2001)
- Mrs Pat (2002), Theatre Royal, York
- Yerma (adaptation) (2003), Royal Exchange Theatre Manchester
- Not Joan the Musical (2003)
- The Lady From The Sea (adaptation) (2003), Almeda Theatre London
- The Little Mermaid (adaptation) (2004), Greenwich Theatre, Riverside Theatre, London
- Nelson (2004), Nuffield Theatre, Southampton
- Broadway Lady (2007)
- Piaf (2008), Donmar Warehouse, London
- Winterlove (2009), The Drill Hall, London
- Despatches (2009), The Drill Hall, London
