= Alan Stanford =

English-Irish actor, director and writer (born 1949)

Alan Stanford (born 1949) is an English-Irish actor, director and writer. He has worked in the theatre for many years, including a 30 year association with the Gate Theatre as both actor and director. He is well known for playing George Manning in the popular Irish drama series Glenroe.

== Personal life ==
Though originally from Liverpool, Stanford's childhood was spent on the Isle of Wight. He trained as an actor at the Guildhall School of Music and Drama in London. Stanford moved to Ireland in 1969 after touring there and eventually became an Irish citizen. As of 2011, he became resident in the USA and is based in Pittsburgh.

Stanford's parents were John Stanford and Anne Kirkpatrick who raised him for most of his childhood in the Isle of Wight, however in 2010, aged 61, Stanford discovered that he had been adopted and that he shared a biological mother with six younger children. He has been married twice and has two sons from his second marriage.

== Early career ==
As a director Stanford began his career in Ireland at the Project Arts Centre where his productions included works by Shaw, Graham Greene, Brecht, Dürrenmatt and Shakespeare.

He is former Artistic Director of Second Age Theatre Company for whom he has directed many productions, including King Lear, Othello, "Hamlet","Macbeth" and Philadelphia Here I Come.

He directed for the Irish Theatre Company and many other independent companies. For Storytellers (a theatre company), he directed both The Mayor of Casterbridge and Oedipus.

For over thirty years Stanford was an associate of the Gate Theatre Dublin both as actor and director. At the Gate he has directed Romeo and Juliet, Tartuffe, Present Laughter twice, Pride and Prejudice, The Picture of Dorian Gray, Great Expectations twice, A Tale of Two Cities, The Collection, Lady Windermere's Fan, Cyrano de Bergerac, An Ideal Husband, A Christmas Carol, Arms and the Man, Oliver Twist, Blithe Spirit, Jane Eyre, The Constant Wife, Private Lives, The Importance of Being Earnest, The Deep Blue Sea, The Old Curiosity Shop, The Real Thing, Endgame, God of Carnage, and Jacques Brel is Alive and Well and Living in Paris.

== Theatre roles ==
His work as an actor includes roles from Shaw to Wilde, from Ibsen to Ayckbourn. He received a Harveys Theatre Award for Best Actor for his performance as Salieri in Amadeus and was nominated for three further performances – Astrov in Uncle Vanya, Higgins in Pygmalion and Valmont in Les Liaisons Dangereuses.

During the Gate Theatre Beckett Festival he performed as Pozzo in Waiting for Godot and as Hamm in Endgame, performances he repeated to considerable critical acclaim at the Lincoln Center in New York, in Toronto, in Melbourne, at the Barbican Theatre in London, in Beijing and in Shanghai. Later stage appearances were at the Abbey Theatre as Lady Bracknell in The Importance of Being Earnest and at the Gate Theatre as Herod in Oscar Wilde's Salome. In the USA he appeared as King Henry in The Lion in Winter

== Other theatre work ==
Stanford's work as a director and adaptor for the stage includes adaptations of Pride and Prejudice, A Christmas Carol, Romeo and Juliet, The Constant Wife, all presented at the Gate Theatre.

He also created a new version of A Doll's House and a stage version of How Many Miles to Babylon?, for Second Age Theatre Company. He created a screenplay of The Picture of Dorian Gray, which he had previously co-adapted for the stage with writer Gavin Kostick. He has also co-written and directed two pantomimes at the Gaiety Theatre, Snow White and Sleeping Beauty.

His adaptations of both Pride and Prejudice and Jane Eyre have been presented in many theatres in both the USA and Canada.

From 2006 to 2011 Stanford was a member of the Arts Council of Ireland.

Stanford's association with PICT Classic Theatre began in 2008 when Andrew S. Paul hired him to direct Salome. Paul later sponsored Stanford's green card and he moved to Pittsburgh. In 2013 he succeeded Paul as executive director and artistic director of PICT. In 2022 he was removed by the board of PICT after the Pittsburgh City Paper published allegations of sexual harassment of actresses, which Stanford described as "libellous".

== Television and film work ==
Stanford's film and television work includes Educating Rita, The Irish R.M., The Treaty, The Hanging Gale, Moll Flanders, Michael Collins, Kidnapped, Animal Farm, etc. For many years he played George Manning in RTÉ's Glenroe.
