= Six Shooter (film) =

2004 short film by Martin McDonagh

- Directed by: Martin McDonagh
- Written by: Martin McDonagh
- Produced by: Kenton Allen; Mia Bays
- Starring: Brendan Gleeson; Rúaidhrí Conroy; David Wilmot
- Cinematography: Baz Irvine
- Edited by: Nicolas Gaster
- Production companies: Film Four; Bord Scannán na hÉirann/The Irish Film Board; Missing in Action Films; Funny Farm Films; Fantastic Films
- Distributed by: The Works
- Release date: 14 October 2004 (Cork International Film Festival)
- Running time: 27 minutes
- Countries: United Kingdom; Ireland
- Language: English

Six Shooter is a 2004 short film written and directed by Martin McDonagh and starring Brendan Gleeson and Rúaidhrí Conroy. A co-production between the United Kingdom and Ireland, it earned several accolades, including the Academy Award for Best Live Action Short Film as well as the BAFTA Award for Best Short Film nomination.

== Plot ==
A doctor informs Donnelly that his wife died at 3 o'clock that morning. He brings Donnelly to her bedside and then excuses himself, as the hospital is unusually busy: there have recently been two cot deaths, as well as a woman whose son "shot the poor head off her." Donnelly spends a few moments unsure of what to say to his wife and gives her a photo of David, their pet rabbit, before leaving.

On the train ride home, Donnelly sits opposite a foul-mouthed, chain-smoking young man. Donnelly tolerates the kid and allows himself to be engaged in some inane conversation, but a couple across the aisle are less accepting of the kid's abrasive manner. After some animated exchanges, the kid leaves to get something from the buffet car. Although he asks if anyone else wants anything, when Donnelly asks for some tea, the kid just mocks him. Donnelly asks the couple what is wrong and learns their son is one of the infants who died.

The kid returns with tea for Donnelly, but refuses his money. The couple has left their booth, and Donnelly tells the kid about their son's death. The kid says they probably "banged it on something", and that he is surprised more parents do not kill their children because most kids are rotten, himself included. The couple returns, and the kid and the husband almost come to blows over the kid's language, but Donnelly intervenes.

Donnelly goes to the buffet cart to get a drink, and the man comes to get tea and engages him in a brief conversation. The kid sits next to the wife, who is looking at a picture of her baby. He says the boy looks like one of the members of Bronski Beat, which is probably why she "banged it on something." Aghast, the woman steps on a table to get out of the booth and trips, tearing the picture. She leaves the train car and the kid goes back to his seat, where he wonders if he has gone too far. Moments later, something thumps against the window, so the kid follows the wife and discovers the torn picture of the baby on the floor next to an open exterior door.

When Donnelly and the husband return to the passenger car, the kid nonchalantly informs the husband that his wife has jumped off the train. The husband takes this as a sick joke, but Donnelly notices blood on the window and pulls the emergency stop. The husband gets off the train, and a policeman questions Donnelly and the kid and thinks he recognizes the kid from somewhere. As the train departs, the policeman sees the kid waving goodbye and abruptly orders another officer to send word to stop the train and "tell the boys to get the guns out."

The kid chides Donnelly for his gloomy mood and says his mother was murdered last night, but he is not mourning. Donnelly tells the kid his wife just died as well, and begins to weep. He says he no longer believes in God after the day's events, which surprises the kid. When the kid asks Donnelly if he wants to hear a story of a cow with trapped wind, Donnelly capitulates, and the kid tells a "true" story that is so bizarre Donnelly cannot help but laugh.

As the train approaches Donnelly's stop, he and the kid part cordially. Noticing armed policemen everywhere, he realises the kid is responsible for the matricide the doctor mentioned. The kid draws two revolvers and opens fire on the police. He is mortally wounded by the return fire, and Donnelly crawls over to him in time to hear his last words, which are regrets that he did not even hit one policeman. Donnelly takes one of the kid's six shooters and hides it in his coat.

At home, Donnelly looks in the gun and sees it contains two bullets. He is about to shoot himself in the head, but hears scratching sounds and gets David. Telling the rabbit that he will be following shortly, he blows its head off. As he points the gun back at himself, he drops it, and it discharges the last bullet. Donnelly looks at the smoking gun, the dead rabbit, and a picture of his wife. He sighs, looks skyward and says, "Oh Jesus. What a fuckin' day!"

== Cast ==
- Brendan Gleeson as Donnelly
- Rúaidhrí Conroy as Kid
- David Wilmot as Man (Woman's husband)
- Aisling O'Sullivan as Woman (Man's wife)
- Gary Lydon as Chief Guard
- Domhnall Gleeson as Cashier (at the cart on the train)
- David Murray as Doctor
- Tadgh Conroy as Young Kid (as in, young Kid)
- David Pearse as Short Man (in Kid's "trapped wind" story)
- Ann McFarlane as Donnelly's Wife('s corpse)
- John Wallace as Junior Garda
- Richard Nisbet as Garda
- Mick Horan as Kid's Dad

== Awards and nominations ==
- In 2004, the film won Best First Short by an Irish Director at the Cork International Film Festival, and Best Irish Short at the Foyle Film Festival.
- In 2005, the film was nominated for Best Short Film at the 58th British Academy Film Awards. It won Best British Short at the British Independent Film Awards, and Best Short Fiction at the Irish Film and Television Awards. Martin McDonagh (writer/director) was also nominated for the IFTA Award for Breakthrough Talent.
- In 2006, the film won the Academy Award for Best Live Action Short Film at the 78th Academy Awards, as well as the Audience Prize at the Leuven International Short Film Festival.
