= Philadelphia, Here I Come! =

Play written by Brian Friel

- Philadelphia, here I come!; A Comedy in Three Acts (1965)
- Original language: English
- Written by: Brian Friel (play)
- Characters: Gar (public); Gar (private); S.B. O'Donnell; Madge Mulhern; Kate Doogan
- Genre: Tragicomedy

Premiere
- Date: September 28, 1964
- Place: Gaiety Theatre, Dublin

Philadelphia, Here I Come! is a 1964 play by Irish dramatist Brian Friel. Set in the fictional town of Ballybeg, County Donegal, the play launched Friel onto the international stage. The play was first staged at the Gaiety Theatre, Dublin on September 28, 1964.

In 1966, in the United States, it ran for 326 performances, and received several Tony Award nominations, including for Best Play and Best Director. The play has since been produced and performed numerous times throughout the years.

== Plot ==
Philadelphia, Here I Come! centres on Gareth (Gar) O'Donnell's move to America, specifically Philadelphia. The play takes place on the night before and morning of Gar's departure to America. Gar is portrayed by two characters, Gar Public ("the Gar that people see, talk to, talk about") and Gar Private ("the unseen man, the man within, the conscience"). Gareth lives with his father, S. B. O'Donnell ("a responsible, respectable citizen") with whom he has never connected. Gar works for his father in his shop and their relationship is no different from that of Boss and Employee. Private often makes fun of S.B. calling him "Screwballs" and parodying his nightly routine as a fashion show.

Essentially, this play is a tragicomedy. It contains many comical scenes, especially the scene with Lizzy Sweeney, Gar's aunt, in which Gar decides to go to America. Despite the fact that Gar seems to have a relationship with his father no different from that of Boss and Employee, there are indications that there is love between them. In episode 1, Madge says "It must have been near daybreak when he (SB O'Donnell) got to sleep last night. I could hear the bed creaking." Other indications that SB is secretly devastated by his son's imminent departure, include his remembrance of Gar in a sailor suit proudly declaring he need not go to school, he'll work in his father's shop – a memory of an event that may not have happened, and the scene when he pretends to read the paper, but fails to notice that it has been upside-down.

Gar's reasons for going to America (he wanted to prove to Aunt Lizzie that he was not "cold like the O'Donnells"), along with his secret love for his uncommunicative father, and their desperate final, pathetic attempts to communicate make this play quite tragic.

All of the action in this play takes place within a period of a few hours on the evening of Gar's departure, but it also includes flashbacks to Gar's relationship with local girl Kate Doogan, and the visit from his Aunt Lizzie.

I've stuck around this hole far too long. I'm telling you, it's a bloody quagmire, a backwater, a dead-end! And everybody in it goes crazy sooner or later! Everybody!

— Gar Public, Episode 2

== Characters ==
Below is a list of the characters from the play Philadelphia, Here I Come! along with a cast list from when it was first performed, at the Gaiety Theatre, Dublin, on September 28, 1964.

- Public Gareth (Gar) O'Donnell – Patrick Bedford
- Private Gareth (Gar) O'Donnell – Donal Donnelly
- S.B. "Screwballs" O'Donnell – Eamonn Kelly
- Madge Mulhern – Mairín D. O'Sullivan
- Kate Doogan (later Kate King) – Máire Hastings
- Senator Doogan – Cecil Barror
- Lizzie Sweeney (gars auntie)
- Con Sweeney – Tom Irwin
- Ben Burton – Michael Mara
- Ned – Eamon Morrissey
- Tom – Brendan O'Sullivan
- Joe – Emmet Bergin
- Canon Mick O'Byrne – Alex McDonald

== Productions ==
The play was first staged at the Gaiety Theatre, Dublin on September 28, 1964. The production, directed by Hilton Edwards, then transferred to Broadway in the United States, where it premiered on February 16, 1966 at the original Helen Hayes Theatre, by the David Merrick Arts Foundation, with arrangement by Oscar Lewenstein and Michael White. It ran for 326 performances, and received several Tony Award nominations, including for Best Play and Best Director.

In 2004, the play was performed through the Association of Regional Theatres Northern Ireland, directed by Adrian Dunbar and produced by Andrea Montgomery. Second Age Theatre Company staged the play in 2007, directed by Alan Stanford. This production toured Ireland, stopping off at Donegal, Ennis, Dublin and Cork, as well as New York, Texas and California in the United States.

Noel Pearson produced a revival of the play at Dublin's Gaiety Theatre in March/April 2010. In 2012 the play was staged at Donmar Warehouse Theatre in London.

Andrew Flynn directed the play at Lyric Theatre, Belfast in February/March 2014. In October 2021, Patrick Talbot Productions presented the play at Cork Opera House. The cast included Alex Murphy as Private Gar.

The play is on the syllabus for English Higher Level and Ordinary Level for the Irish Leaving Certificate examinations, as well as the English A1 course of the International Baccalaureate.

== Reception ==
American film and theater critic Stanley Kauffmann reviewed the play when it premiered in 1966 at the Helen Hayes Theater. He opined that the play "moves along mostly in one plane of intensity and progress, and as a lyric of poignancy, it lacks edge". He said Hilton Edwards direction is "workmanlike, but it is a disappointment". In the end, Kauffmann argues that "despite the good work of most of the actors, it is Mr. Friel who lets us down. Not by trickery or fakery, but simply by naïveté in art. There is considerable pleasantness, little poetry and insufficient power in his play".

American Broadway theatre critic Walter Kerr reviewed the play as well in 1966 at its premiere. He said it was a "funny play, a prickly play, finally a most affecting play, and the pleasure it gives is of a most peculiar kind". He opined that Friel has "written a play about an ache, and he has written it so simply and so honestly that the ache itself becomes a warming fire".

In 2004, at its premiere at the Millennium Forum in Derry, Northern Ireland, Jane Coyle wrote in The Irish Times, that Adrian Dunbar has "shone a beam into the dark corners of the play and has crafted an intensely unsettling and emotionally charged evening." She also pointed out that it was Dunbar's directing debut, and "the strain showed in some crucial scenes", and that there is "still work to be done".

In 2007, Patrick Lonergan, Professor of Drama and Theatre Studies at National University of Ireland, wrote that the play has had "lasting significance; it was Friel's first international success, and the play's greatest significance is probably its ongoing popularity with audiences, which can be explained by Friel's skillful combination of humor with a serious treatment of the pain of a young man forced to emigrate".

In 2021, at its premiere at the Cork Opera House in Ireland, Marjorie Brennan reviewed the play for the Irish Examiner. In her view, the play is a "classic of Irish theatre and a well-judged choice for Cork Opera House’s post-lockdown reawakening." She praised producer Patrick Talbot, director Geoff Gould and the cast, for "pulling off such a confident and entertaining full-scale production, a poignant and timely reminder of our need for connection and how we often struggle to articulate it".

== Film ==
The play was adapted for a film released in Ireland in 1970. The adaptation was produced and directed by John Quested and stars Siobhán McKenna, Donal McCann, and Des Cave. It was released to DVD in 2003, along with thirteen other films, as part of the American Film Theatre series.

== Awards and nominations ==
=== Original Broadway production ===
Year	Award	Category	Nominee	Result
1966	Tony Award	Best Play		Nominated
1966	Tony Award	Best Actor in a Play	Patrick Bedford	Nominated
1966	Tony Award	Best Actor in a Play	Donal Donnelly	Nominated
1966	Tony Award	Best Featured Actor in a Play	Eamon Kelly	Nominated
1966	Tony Award	Best Featured Actress in a Play	Mairin D. O'Sullivan	Nominated
1966	Tony Award	Best Direction of a Play	Hilton Edwards	Nominated
