= Martin McDonagh =

Irish playwright and filmmaker (born 1970)

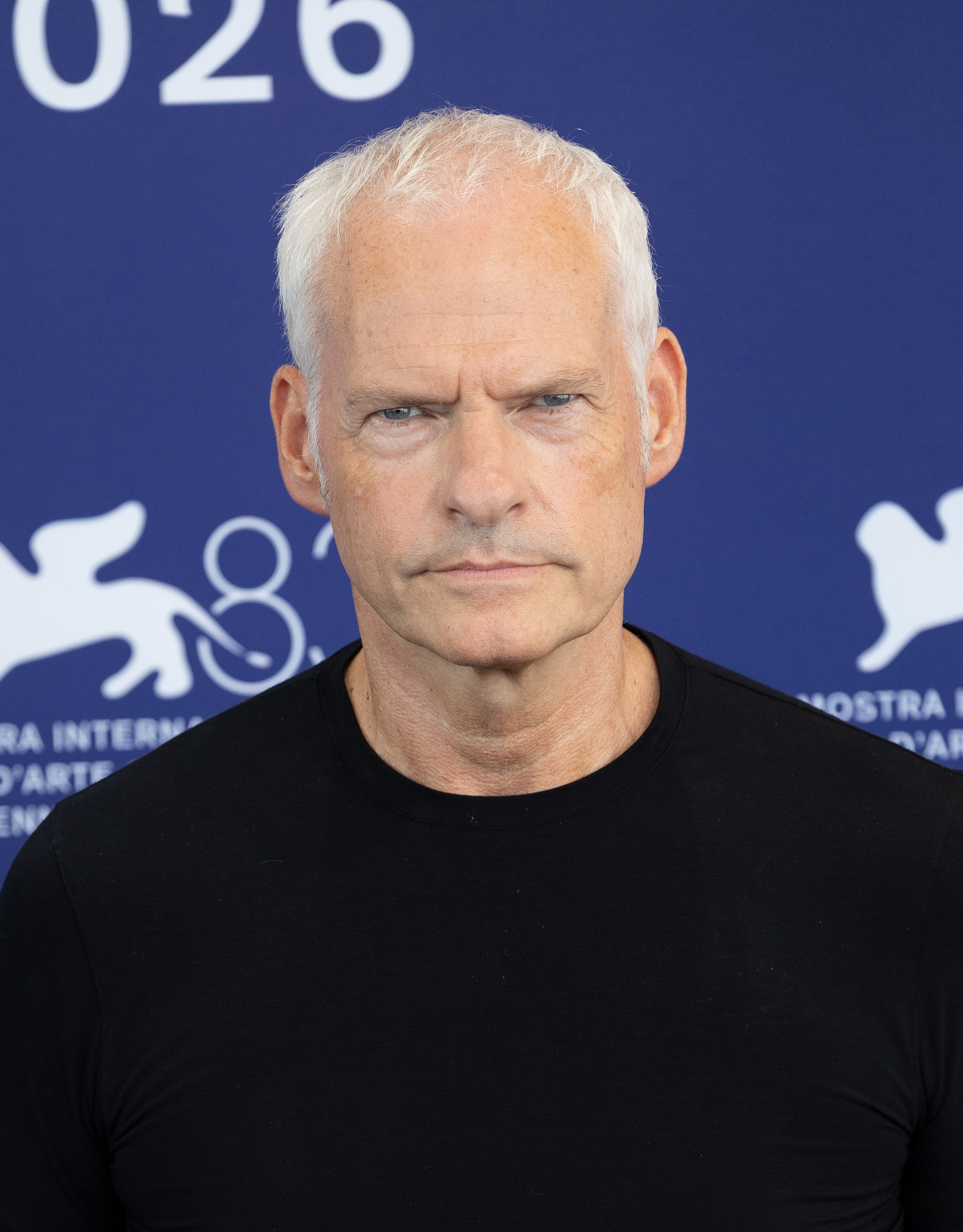
- McDonagh in 2026
- Born: Martin Faranan McDonagh; 26 March 1970 (age 56); London, England
- Citizenship: Ireland (Note: Born in London to Irish parents, McDonagh considers himself Irish and does not hold a British passport.)
- Occupations: Playwright; filmmaker
- Years active: 1996–present
- Partner: Phoebe Waller-Bridge (2017–present)
- Relatives: John Michael McDonagh (brother)
- Awards: Full list

Martin Faranan McDonagh (/məkˈdɒnə/ mək-DON-ə; born 26 March 1970) is an Irish playwright and filmmaker. Known for his absurdist dark humour and provocative style, he has received numerous accolades, including an Academy Award, six BAFTAs, two Golden Globes, and three Laurence Olivier Awards in addition to nominations for five Tony Awards.

His plays, many of which have been produced in the West End and on Broadway, include two trilogies set in County Galway. The Leenane Trilogy consists of: The Beauty Queen of Leenane (1996), A Skull in Connemara (1997), and The Lonesome West (1997). The Aran Islands Trilogy consists of: The Cripple of Inishmaan (1996), The Lieutenant of Inishmore (2001), and The Banshees of Inisherin, the last of which has never been produced or published. He also wrote the plays The Pillowman (2003), A Behanding in Spokane (2010), and Hangmen (2015).

McDonagh won the Academy Award for Best Live Action Short Film for Six Shooter (2004) before expanding into feature film as a writer-director. He has received six Academy Award nominations for his work on his dark comedy films In Bruges (2008), Three Billboards Outside Ebbing, Missouri (2017), and The Banshees of Inisherin (2022). He also directed the satirical crime thrillers Seven Psychopaths (2012) and Wild Horse Nine (2026), and executive produced his brother's films The Second Death (2000) and The Guard (2011).

== Early life ==
McDonagh was born on 26 March 1970 in Camberwell, London, to Irish parents. His mother was from Killeenduff, Easky, County Sligo, and his father was from Leitir Mealláin, Connemara, County Galway. His brother is filmmaker John Michael McDonagh.

An Irish citizen, McDonagh split his childhood between London and Galway. He was educated at Sacred Heart Catholic School, Camberwell and Salesian College, Battersea, but left school at age 16. In 1992, when he was 22-years-old, his parents permanently settled in Galway, though McDonagh and his brother remained in London.

== Career ==
=== 1996–2007: Breakthrough as a playwright ===
==== The Leenane Trilogy ====
Separated into two trilogies, McDonagh's first six plays are located in and around County Galway. McDonagh's first play trilogy is set in Leenane, a small village on the west coast of Ireland. The trilogy starts off with The Beauty Queen of Leenane (1996), which is the story of the dysfunctional relationship between a spinster and her domineering mother, during the course of which the former faces her last chance at love, and the latter faces a rather grim end. The play was well received on its opening night in Galway in 1996 and was next produced off-Broadway by the Atlantic Theater Company in 1998. The play transferred to Broadway in April 1998 and was nominated for a Tony Award for Best Play.

The second part of the trilogy, A Skull in Connemara, involves a Connemara man who is employed to exhume skeletons in an overcrowded graveyard and he encounters the wife whom he was once accused of killing. The play premiered in 1997 at Town Hall Theatre, Galway. The play was presented at the Royal Court Theatre (London), and made its US premiere at the A Contemporary Theatre (ACT) in Seattle, Washington in July to August 2000. The play ran off-Broadway from January to May 2001 at the Gramercy Theatre, produced by the Roundabout Theatre.

The final part is titled The Lonesome West, a play involving two brothers bickering in the aftermath of the supposedly accidental fatal shooting of their father. The play ran on Broadway in 1999 and received a Tony Award nomination for Best Play in 1999. In 1999, McDonagh was one of the recipients of the fifth Europe Prize Theatrical Realities awarded to the Royal Court Theatre (with Sarah Kane, Mark Ravenhill, Jez Butterworth, and Conor McPherson).

==== The Aran Islands Trilogy ====
McDonagh's second trilogy is set across the Aran Islands, off the coast of County Galway. The first, The Cripple of Inishmaan, is a dark comedy in which a crippled teenager schemes to attain a role in Man of Aran. The play opened in 1997 at the Royal National Theatre (Cottesloe) in London. It opened in April 1998 Off-Broadway at the Joseph Papp Public Theater, with Ruaidhri Conroy in the title role on both occasions. Also in 1998, Frederick Koehler played the title role in the Geffen Playhouse production in Los Angeles, California. In December 2008, The Cripple of Inishmaan was produced Off-Broadway by the Atlantic Theater Company, in conjunction with The Druid Theatre Company of Galway, Ireland.

The Lieutenant of Inishmore is the followup play which was written as a response to the 1993 Warrington bombings when two children were killed by the IRA. It is a dark comedy in which the insane leader of an INLA (Irish National Liberation Army) splinter group discovers that his best friend, a cat, has been killed. The play was produced Off-Broadway in February 2006 by the Atlantic Theater Company. It transferred to Broadway in May 2006 and received a 2006 Tony Award nomination for Best Play.

The Banshees of Inisheer, the third play of the trilogy, was never produced or published, as McDonagh insisted it "isn't any good", though he expressed a desire to return to it when he is older. In 2022, McDonagh directed a film titled The Banshees of Inisherin. The screenplay's resemblance to the play is unclear. The film's screenplay was published in 2022.

McDonagh also penned two prize-winning radio plays, one of which is The Tale of the Wolf and the Woodcutter. McDonagh's first non-Irish play, The Pillowman, premiered at the Royal National Theatre in 2003, after a reading at the Finborough Theatre in 1995. In the play, a writer in a non-specified totalitarian state is interrogated over the content of several of his Brothers Grimm-style short stories. The play was awarded the Laurence Olivier Award for Best New Play in 2004 and received a 2005 Tony Award nomination for Best Play.

=== 2008–2019: Film debut and expansion ===
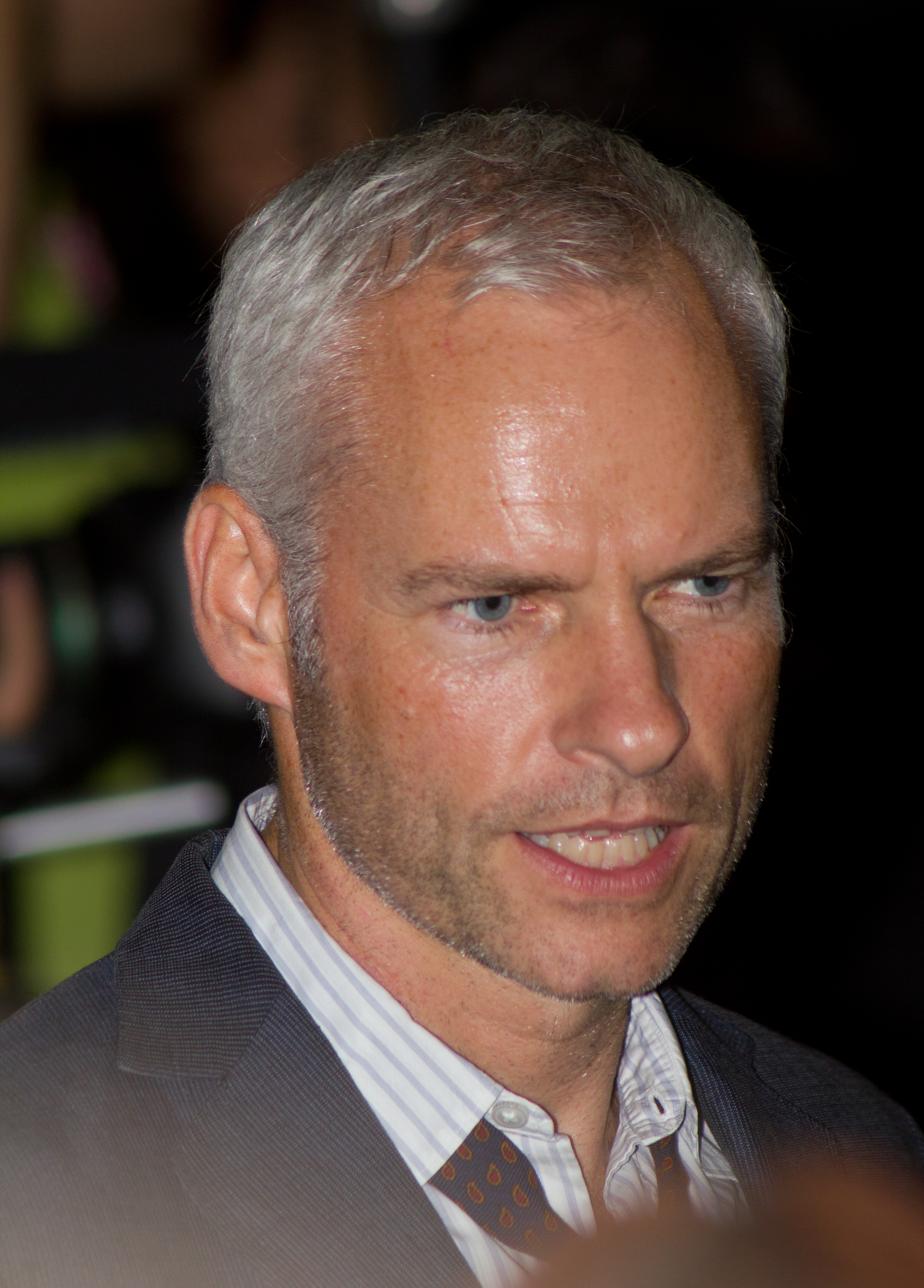
McDonagh in 2012

In 2006, McDonagh won an Academy Award for his short film Six Shooter (2004), which is his first film that he wrote and directed. Six Shooter is a black comedy (as are his plays) that features Brendan Gleeson, Rúaidhrí Conroy, David Wilmot and Aisling O'Sullivan. It was shot on location in Wicklow, Waterford and Rosslare. In the short film, Gleeson's character encounters a strange, and possibly psychotic, young man during a train journey homeward following his wife's death. McDonagh made a deal with Focus Features to direct In Bruges, a feature-length film based on his own screenplay. In the film, two Irish hitmen hide in the Flemish city of Bruges after a problematic job. Released in the US in 2008, the film features Colin Farrell, Ralph Fiennes and Brendan Gleeson. In Bruges was the Opening Night film for the 2008 Sundance Festival and the Jameson Dublin International Film Festival, and McDonagh received a nomination for Best Original Screenplay at the 81st Academy Awards.

In a 2008 interview with Stop Smiling magazine, McDonagh said, "I've got a couple of film scripts that are ready to go. I'm not going to do anything with them for a couple of years, until I've travelled and had some fun. But there's one called Seven Psychopaths; if I do another film, that'll be it. I hope you like it." The production of the film was confirmed in May 2011 and it was eventually released in North America on 12 October 2012. Colin Farrell, Sam Rockwell, Woody Harrelson, Christopher Walken, and Tom Waits star in the film.

In February 2010, an announcement revealed that McDonagh was working on a new stage musical with composer Tom Waits and director Robert Wilson. A Behanding in Spokane is McDonagh's first play that is set in the United States and it premiered on Broadway in March 2010. Lead actor Christopher Walken was nominated for a Tony Award for Best Actor in a Play for his performance as a killer named Carmichael who has been looking for the left hand he lost in his youth for a quarter of a century. The play was nominated for the 2010 Drama League Award for Distinguished Production of a Play.

McDonagh's play Hangmen premiered at the Royal Court Theatre, London, in September 2015. It follows Harry Wade, England's second-best hangman, after the abolition of hanging in Great Britain in 1965. The play was awarded the Laurence Olivier Award for Best New Play in 2016. In 2020, Hangmen briefly premiered on Broadway at the John Golden Theatre starring Mark Addy and Dan Stevens before being shut down due to the COVID-19 pandemic. The play returned on Broadway in 2022 this time with David Threlfall and Alfie Allen. The play received critical acclaim from critics including from The New York Times theatre critic Jesse Green who wrote, "[Hangmen] feels like a perfect fit for our unjust times".

McDonagh wrote and directed the dark drama Three Billboards Outside Ebbing, Missouri (2017), starring Frances McDormand, Woody Harrelson, and Sam Rockwell, which premiered at the Venice Film Festival on 4 September and won the People's Choice Award at the Toronto International Film Festival on 17 September 2017. Three Billboards won four awards at the 2017 Golden Globes, including Best Screenplay for McDonagh. McDonagh received Academy Award nominations for Best Picture and Best Original Screenplay for the film. McDonagh's play A Very Very Very Dark Matter is set in a townhouse in Copenhagen that reveals the dark source of the tales of children's author Hans Christian Andersen, as well as of the writer Charles Dickens. It premiered at the Bridge Theatre, London in October 2018.

=== 2020s–present ===
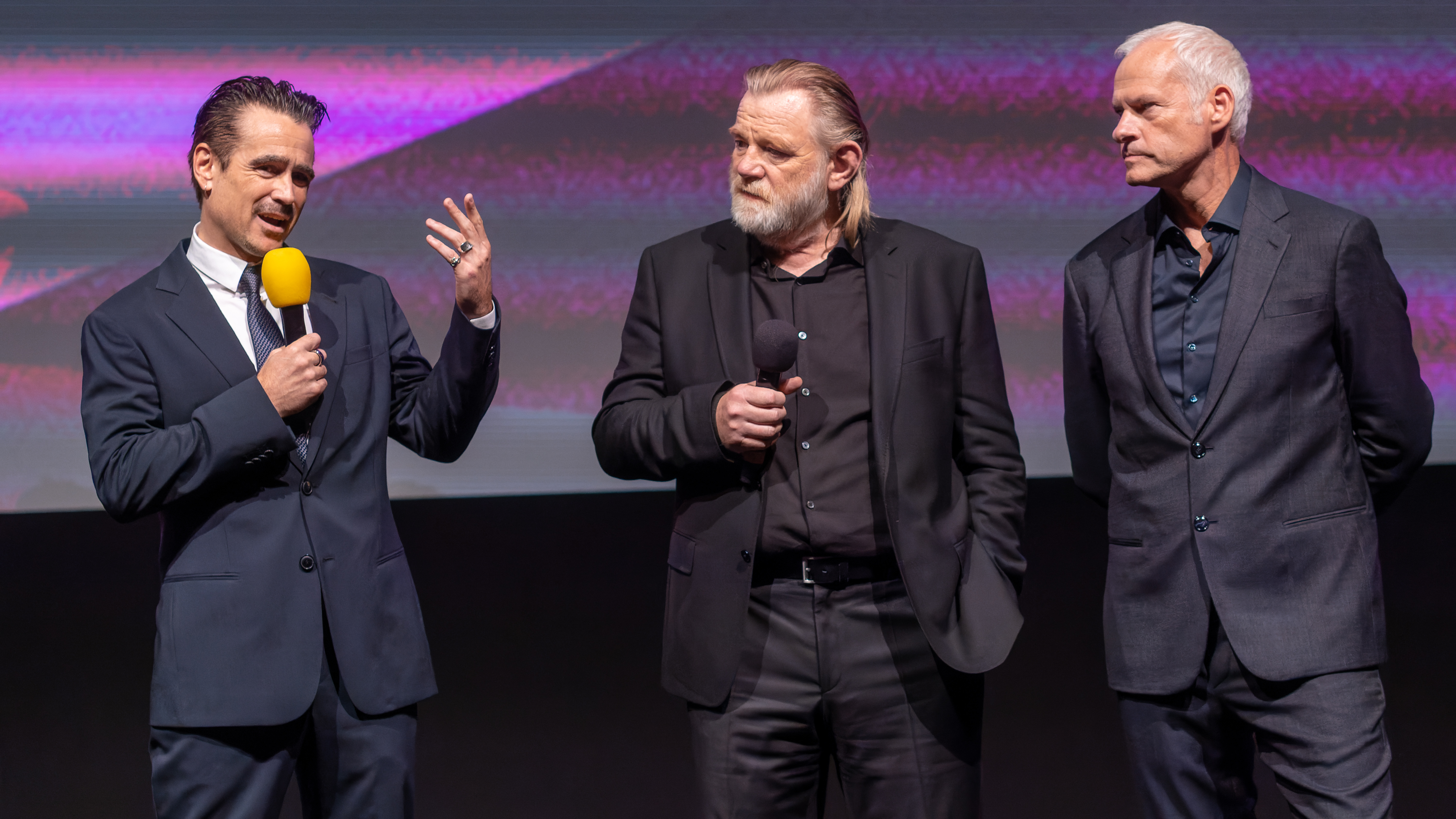
Colin Farrell, Brendan Gleeson, and McDonagh at the BFI film premiere of The Banshees of Inisherin (2022)

Production of McDonagh's next film project was announced in 2020, titled The Banshees of Inisherin, with Brendan Gleeson and Colin Farrell in the lead roles. Production was delayed by COVID-19, with shooting ultimately beginning in August 2021 and wrapping on 23 October 2021. The movie held its world premiere at the 79th Venice International Film Festival on 5 September 2022 and had a limited theatrical release on 21 October 2022. McDonagh was awarded Best Original Screenplay at the 80th Golden Globe Awards, where the film also won Best Comedy/Musical. McDonagh received Academy Award nominations for Best Picture, Best Director, and Best Original Screenplay.

Principal photography on McDonagh's next film, Wild Horse Nine, began on Easter Island in March 2025. The film stars Sam Rockwell, John Malkovich, Steve Buscemi, Tom Waits, and Parker Posey, and released on 6 November 2026.

== Style and themes ==
McDonagh has stated that he prefers writing films to plays, as he holds a "respect for the whole history of films and a slight disrespect for theatre." In a 1998 conversation with Irish drama critic Fintan O'Toole in BOMB magazine, McDonagh further explained,

It's not that I don't respect theatre. I'm intelligent enough to know that a play can completely inspire a person as much as a film...[but] theatre isn't something that's connected to me, from a personal point of view, I can't appreciate what I'm doing.

In an interview in 2005, the New York Times writer observed that McDonagh "now seems more comfortably resigned to the storytelling powers of drama, if still dismissive of its inherent elitism. 'It's kind of weird working in an art form that's not, well ...,' he stops and starts again. 'It's strange to be working in an art form that costs $100 to participate in.'" In a 2015 interview with Sean O'Hagan of The Guardian, McDonagh said theatre "is never going to be edgy in the way I want it to be", when discussing his absence from London theatre and promoting his new play Hangmen.

Some theatres have refused McDonagh's plays due to "unpalatable language".

== Personal life ==
McDonagh lives in East London. He is a vegetarian.

Since 2018, McDonagh has been in a relationship with Phoebe Waller-Bridge. Together, they are regarded as one of the most influential screenwriting couples in the industry.

== Credits ==
=== Films ===
| Year | Title | Functioned as | | | Notes |
| Year | Title | Director | Writer | Producer | Notes |
|---|---|---|---|---|---|
| 2004 | Six Shooter | Yes | Yes | No | Short film |
| 2008 | In Bruges | Yes | Yes | No | |
| 2012 | Seven Psychopaths | Yes | Yes | Yes | |
| 2017 | Three Billboards Outside Ebbing, Missouri | Yes | Yes | Yes | |
| 2022 | The Banshees of Inisherin | Yes | Yes | Yes | |
| 2026 | Wild Horse Nine | Yes | Yes | Yes | |

Executive producer only

- The Second Death (2000)
- The Guard (2011)

=== Theater ===
| Year (Note: Year in which the project was written) | Title | Ireland / London Debut | Off-Broadway Debut | Broadway Debut |
|---|---|---|---|---|
| 1994 | The Banshees of Inisheer (Note: Unproduced; later adapted into the 2021 film) | —N/a | —N/a | —N/a |
| 1996 | The Beauty Queen of Leenane | 1996 / 1997 | —N/a | 1998 |
| 1996 | The Cripple of Inishmaan | 1996 / 2013 | 1998 | 2014 |
| 1997 | A Skull in Connemara | 1997 | 2001 | —N/a |
| 1997 | The Lonesome West | 1997 | —N/a | 1999 |
| 2001 | The Lieutenant of Inishmore | 2001 / 2002 | 2006 | 2006 |
| 2003 | The Pillowman | 2003 / 2025 | —N/a | 2005 |
| 2010 | A Behanding in Spokane | —N/a | —N/a | 2010 |
| 2015 | Hangmen | 2015 | —N/a | 2022 |
| 2018 | A Very Very Very Dark Matter | 2018 | —N/a | —N/a |

== Recurring collaborators ==
U = uncredited

| Work Actor | 2008 | 2012 | 2017 | 2022 | 2026 |
| Work Actor | In Bruges | Seven Psychopaths | Three Billboards Outside Ebbing, Missouri | The Banshees of Inisherin | Wild Horse Nine |
|---|---|---|---|---|---|
| Željko Ivanek | | | | | |
| Colin Farrell | | | | | |
| Arnold Montey | U | U | | | |
| Brendan Gleeson | | | | | |
| Bomber Hurley Smith | U | | | U | |
| Sam Rockwell | | | | | |
| Abbie Cornish | | | | | |
| Woody Harrelson | | | | | |
| Sandy Martin | | U | | | |
| Brendan Sexton III | | | | | |
| Amanda Warren | | | | | |
| Tom Waits | | | | | |
| Kerry Condon | | | | | |

== Awards and nominations ==
Awards and nominations received by McDonagh's films
| Year | Title | Academy Awards | | BAFTA Awards | | Golden Globe Awards | |
| Year | Title | Nominations | Wins | Nominations | Wins | Nominations | Wins |
|---|---|---|---|---|---|---|---|
| 2008 | In Bruges | 1 | | 4 | 1 | 3 | 1 |
| 2012 | Seven Psychopaths | | | 1 | | | |
| 2017 | Three Billboards Outside Ebbing, Missouri | 7 | 2 | 9 | 5 | 6 | 4 |
| 2022 | The Banshees of Inisherin | 9 | | 10 | 4 | 8 | 3 |
| Total | | 17 | 2 | 24 | 10 | 17 | 8 |

Directed Academy Award performances
Under McDonagh's direction, these actors have received Academy Award nominations and wins for their performances in their respective roles.

| Year | Performer | Film | Result |
|---|---|---|---|
Academy Award for Best Actor
| 2023 | Colin Farrell | The Banshees of Inisherin | Nominated |
Academy Award for Best Actress
| 2017 | Frances McDormand | Three Billboards Outside Ebbing, Missouri | Won |
Academy Award for Best Supporting Actor
| 2017 | Woody Harrelson | Three Billboards Outside Ebbing, Missouri | Nominated |
| 2017 | Sam Rockwell | Three Billboards Outside Ebbing, Missouri | Won |
| 2023 | Brendan Gleeson | The Banshees of Inisherin | Nominated |
| 2023 | Barry Keoghan | The Banshees of Inisherin | Nominated |
Academy Award for Best Supporting Actress
| 2023 | Kerry Condon | The Banshees of Inisherin | Nominated |

== See also ==
- London Irish
- List of Irish dramatists
- List of Irish film directors
- List of Academy Award winners and nominees from Great Britain
- List of Academy Award winners and nominees from Ireland
- List of European Academy Award winners and nominees
- List of Golden Globe winners
