= Association of Regional Theatres, Northern Ireland =

The Association of Regional Theatres, Northern Ireland (ART NI), founded in 2003, brings together five regional theatres in Northern Ireland to jointly develop productions touring Northern Ireland, and other theatres in the Republic of Ireland and England.

- The Ardhowen Theatre, Enniskillen
- The Burnavon Arts and Cultural Theatre, Cookstown
- The Market Place Theatre, Armagh
- Millennium Forum, L'Derry
- The University of Ulster's Riverside Theatre, Coleraine

Following the success of their first production in 2007, the Irish classic Philadelphia, Here I Come!, ART NI planned to stage a "classic Irish play" at least once a year.

== Productions ==
- 2003-2004 - Brian Friel's Philadelphia, Here I Come!; Adrian Dunbar (director) and Andrea Montgomery (producer for ART NI)
- 2006-2007 - Hugh Leonard's Da (running at the Lyric Theatre in Belfast until February 2007)produced by Vincent McCann for Art NI
