= Marlene (musical) =

1997 stage musical

- Music: Various Artists
- Lyrics: Various Artists
- Book: Pam Gems
- Premiere: 1997: Oldham Coliseum Theatre
- Productions: 1997 (West End); 1999 (Broadway)

Marlene is a 1997 stage musical about the life of Marlene Dietrich, with a book by Pam Gems and a musical score consisting of standards sung by Dietrich, including several selections by Friedrich Hollaender.

The show was performed on Broadway and earned two Tony Award nominations, Best Actress in a Musical and Tony Award for Best Book of a Musical. The show was also nominated for two Laurence Olivier Awards for Best Actress in a Musical and Best Entertainment.

== Synopsis ==
The show is set in Paris, 1969 and follows Dietrich as she prepares for a performance.

== Production history ==
After regional tryouts, the show was performed on London's West End at the Lyric Theatre, London in 1997. The show next transferred to Broadway, and began previews March 30, 1999 and officially opened on April 11, 1999. The show closed on May 2, 1999, after 25 official performances. The show was directed by Sean Mathias.

== Musical numbers ==
- "You Do Something To Me"
- "Look Me Over Closely"
- "Illusions"
- "Johnny, (wenn Du Geburtstag hast)"
- "(Ich bin die fesche) Lola"
- "I Wish You Love (Que Reste-til de Nos Amours)"

Act II

- "Mein Blondes Baby"
- "Warum (Frag' Nicht Warum Ich Gehe)"
- "The Laziest Girl in Town"
- "The Boys in the Back Room"
- "Lili Marlene"
- "Honeysuckle Rose"
- "Where Have All the Flowers Gone?"
- "La Vie en rose"
- "Falling In Love Again"

An original cast recording was released in 1997 following the West End production.

== Original casts ==
Character	West End 1997	Broadway 1999
Marlene Dietrich	Sian Phillips	Sian Phillips
Mutti	Billy Mathias	Mary Diveny
Vivian Hoffman	Lou Gish	Margaret Whitton
