= A Very Very Very Dark Matter =

2018 play by Martin McDonagh

- Poster for the original production
- Written by: Martin McDonagh
- Original language: English
- Subject: Hans Christian Andersen
- Setting: Copenhagen, Denmark

Premiere
- Date premiered: 19 October 2018
- Place premiered: Bridge Theatre, London

A Very Very Very Dark Matter is a 2018 play by Martin McDonagh.

== Production history ==
The play made its world premiere the Bridge Theatre in London from 19 October 2018 (previews from 12 October) to 6 January 2019. The production starred:

- Jim Broadbent as Hans Christian Andersen
- Johnetta Eula’Mae Ackles as Marjory
- Phil Daniels as Charles Dickens
- Elizabeth Berrington as Catherine Dickens
- Lee Knight as Edvard
- Ryan Pope as Dirk
- Tom Waits as Narrator
- Paul Bradley as Press Man
- Graeme Hawley as Barry
- Kundai Kanyama as Ogechi
- Jamie McKie, Alice Selwyn, Anthony Taylor as Crowd
- Alistair Benson, Noah Brignull, James Roberts as Charles Jr
- Audrey Hayhurst, Amelia Walter, Annabelle Westenholz-Smith as Kate / Ingrid
- Regan Garcia, Leo Hart, Austin Taylor as Walter

It was directed by Matthew Dunster, designed by Anna Fleischle with lighting by Phillip Gladwell, sound by George Dennis and video by Finn Ross.

== Reception ==
The play received mixed reviews from critics. Writing for Variety, Matt Trueman wrote "McDonagh’s play feels like set pieces and comic sketches taped together. Very, very, very dark? Maybe — but lacking in matter." In her review for The Hollywood Reporter, Leslie Felperin wrote "this satirical slap at long-dead literary figures feels oddly toothless in the end, no more germane than a weak Saturday Night Live skit." Henry Hitchings awarded the play 2 stars in his review for The Standard, sharing that "despite a handful of smart jokes, this strenuously dark matter proves unsatisfying — and too obviously eager to test the boundaries of what audiences find offensive." Andrzej Lukowski of Time Out opined "‘A Very Very Very Dark Matter’ is a car crash in many respects, but the actual production has a sort of malevolent brio that lingers long after you’ve given up trying to figure out what McDonagh was on when he wrote it." Michael Billington of The Guardian was more positive in his review, awarding it 4 stars and sharing "For me, it confirms that McDonagh is a genuine original with a talent to disturb." In another 4-star review for the BBC, Will Gompertz wrote that it "is not as creepy or harrowing as McDonagh's earlier play The Pillowman, which you could argue is a companion piece. But it does make you think."
