= How Many Miles to Babylon? =

English language nursery rhyme

"How Many Miles to Babylon"

Nursery rhyme
- Published: 1801
- Songwriter: Unknown

"How Many Miles to Babylon" is an English-language nursery rhyme. It has a Roud Folk Song Index number of 8148.

== Lyrics ==
The accepted modern lyrics are:

How many miles to Babylon?
Three score miles and ten.
Can I get there by candle-light?
Yes, and back again ...
If your heels are nimble and your toes are light,
You may get there by candle-light

A longer Scottish version has the lyrics:

King and Queen of Cantelon,
How many miles to Babylon?
Eight and eight, and other eight
Will I get there by candle-light?
If your horse be good and your spurs be bright
How mony men have ye?
Mae nor ye daur come and see

Various places have replaced Babylon in the rhyme, including London town, Barberry and Berry Bright.

== Origins ==
The rhyme was not recorded until the nineteenth century, but the reference to Cantelon in the Scottish version has led some to conclude that it refers to Caledon in the time of the Crusades. Babylon may be a corruption of 'Babyland', but the city was a common allusion particularly in seventeenth-century England and 'Can I get there by candlelight?' was a common saying in the sixteenth century. It referred to the time of day at which it was necessary to light a candle as the daylight faded. The question here then is to whether or not Babylon can be reached before the light of day faded and the candles must be lit. Naturally this time changed throughout the seasons. In the 1824 edition of The Scottish Gallovidian Encyclopedia there's a description of the rhyme and the game, giving the distance as "six, seven or a lang eight".

The rhyme was originally accompanied by a singing game in which two lines face each other, with one player in the middle. At the end of the rhyme the players have to cross the space and any caught help the original player in the middle catch the others. The game seems to have fallen out of use in the twentieth century. The game Red Rover, which is first documented in the early twentieth century, has, in its earliest recorded form, the same rules; hypothesizing a connection between the death of the older game and the spread of the new one is therefore natural, though necessarily speculative.

== In literature ==
Joan Didion uses the text as an introduction to her essay Goodbye to All That, featured in Slouching Towards Bethlehem.

Jennifer Johnston uses the line "How many miles to Babylon ?" as the title of her 1974 novel about the relationship between two men, an Anglo-Irish aristocrat, Alexander Moore, and a lower-class son of a labourer on his lands, Jerry, as they experience the First World War. Early in the novel, the narrator quotes the rhyme to a priest who has come to visit him in prison.

Diana Wynne Jones uses the rhyme in Deep Secret.

Neil Gaiman uses the rhyme (the accepted modern lyrics) in Stardust (Neil Gaiman novel)

Don Martin uses the rhyme in "Verity Vox and the Curse of Foxfire".

Seanan McGuire uses the rhyme in "An Artificial Night".
