= The Lonesome West =

Play by Martin McDonagh

- Written by: Martin McDonagh
- Series: Connemara trilogy
- Setting: Ireland

Book cover

The Lonesome West is a play by Martin McDonagh, part of his Connemara trilogy, which includes The Beauty Queen of Leenane and A Skull in Connemara. All three plays depict the murderous occurrences in the western Irish town of Leenane.

== Synopsis ==
The Lonesome West features the constantly arguing brothers Coleman and Valene, whose father has just died in a shotgun 'accident.' Valene is only interested in his religious ornaments and drinking poteen. Coleman is only interested in eating, and attends funerals to collect free sausage rolls and vol au vents.

Valene goes out to help drag the body of Garda Thomas Hanlon (character in "A Skull in Connemara") out of the lake with Father Welsh. Hanlon had just killed himself. Coleman pretends to follow, delaying to tie his shoelace, despite the fact that he was wearing loafers. While alone in the house, he destroys all of Valene's plastic figurines, by placing them in Valene's new stove. Only Father Welsh, the alcoholic parish priest, attempts to fix their relationship, but his advice mostly goes unheard.

It is revealed later in the play that Coleman had shot his father because he insulted Coleman's new haircut. Valene agreed to provide an alibi for Coleman, stating that their father's death was accidental. In exchange, he demanded Coleman's share of the inheritance money. Neither of the brothers show any grief or remorse at their father's death. The two brothers fight over everything and anything. Valene attacks Coleman over eating his crisps, and they fight over whose turn it is to read the magazine, and who left the top off Valene's pen, leading to both constant bickering and physical violence. Father Welsh, depressed because of the hatred between the brothers, and with a low self-esteem, writes a letter begging the brothers to get along, asserting that he will stake his soul on it. Father Welsh then proceeds to drown himself in the lake. This act is significant, as there has already been a lengthy discussion about suicide in the play. The characters believe that damnation follows suicide for the victims, as it is technically a murder of the self, and you don't have the opportunity to repent for it afterwards.

Girleen, a young lady who briefly appears earlier in the story to sell poteen to Valene, and who was deeply attached to Father Welsh, is devastated by his suicide, and delivers the letter to the brothers, before going away for the rest of the play. When Coleman and Valene read his letter, they attempt to reconcile themselves, and a "confessions" scene ensues, in which the brothers take turns to admit the wrongs that they had secretly done to each other in the past, and to forgive each other's "sins." Coleman loses his temper when Valene admits to shoving a pencil down the throat of Coleman's old girlfriend, causing her to then fall in love with the doctor that removed it. Valene says "Try and top that one for yourself." Coleman delivers an even more terrible confession, revealing that he cut the ears off Valene's dog two years previously, presenting the evidence of the severed dog's ears in a brown paper bag. In shock, Valene attempts to murder Coleman with a kitchen knife, but Coleman in turn destroys Valene's stove with multiple shot gun blasts, and smashes his new collection of ceramic religious figurines. After a standoff, they calm down and Coleman apologises sincerely; they concede that "Maybe Father Welsh's soul'll be all right so."

== Production history ==
The play premiered in June 1997 at the Druid Theatre Company in Galway, at the Town Hall Theatre in a co-production with the Royal Court Theatre.

The play transferred to the Royal Court Theatre, London on 26 July 1997.

The play premiered on Broadway at the Lyceum Theatre on 27 April 1999. The same four actors who had appeared in the Galway and London productions also appeared in the Broadway production: Brían F. O'Byrne played Valene, Maelíosa Stafford played Coleman, David Ganly played Father Welsh, and Dawn Bradfield played Girleen. Garry Hynes directed all three productions. The play closed on 13 June 1999 after 55 performances and 9 previews.

== Awards and nominations ==
- Tony Award for Best Play nominated
- Alfréd Radok Award for Best Play won
- Tony Award for Best Actor (Brían F. O'Byrne) nominated
- Tony Award for Direction of a Play nominated
- Tony Award for Featured Actress in a Play (Dawn Bradfield) nominated
