= Siân Phillips =

Welsh actress (born 1933)

Dame Siân Phillips DBE
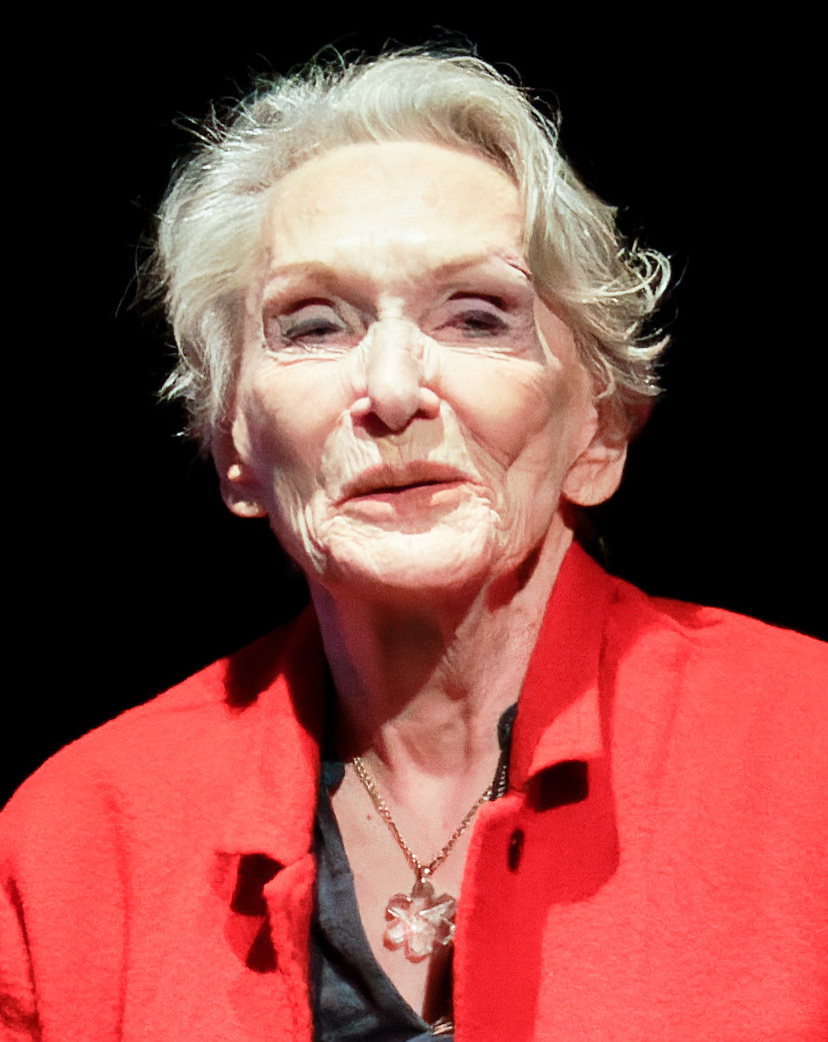
- Phillips in 2022
- Born: Jane Elizabeth Ailwên Phillips; 14 May 1933 (age 93); Gwaun-Cae-Gurwen, Glamorgan, Wales
- Occupation: Actress
- Years active: 1944–present
- Spouses: Don Roy (m. 1956; div. 1959); Peter O'Toole (m. 1959; div. 1979); Robin Sachs (m. 1979; div. 1991)
- Children: 2, including Kate O'Toole

Dame Jane Elizabeth Ailwên Phillips (born 14 May 1933), known professionally as Siân Phillips (/ʃɑːn/ SHAHN), is a Welsh actress. Her early career consisted primarily of stage roles, including the title roles in Ibsen's Hedda Gabler and George Bernard Shaw's Saint Joan. In the 1960s, she started taking on more roles in television and film. She is particularly known for her performance as Livia in the 1976 BBC television series I, Claudius, for which she was awarded a BAFTA and a Royal Television Society award. She was nominated for a Tony Award and Olivier Award for Best Actress in a Musical for her performance as Marlene Dietrich in Marlene.

== Early life ==
Phillips was born on 14 May 1933 in Gwaun-Cae-Gurwen, Glamorgan, South Wales, the daughter of Sally (née Thomas), a teacher, and David Phillips, a steelworker who became a policeman. She is a Welsh-speaker: in the first volume of her autobiography Private Faces (1999) she notes that she spoke only Welsh for much of her childhood, learning English by listening to the radio.

Phillips attended Pontardawe Grammar School and originally was known there as Jane, but her Welsh teacher called her Siân, the Welsh form of Jane. Later she read English and Philosophy at University College Cardiff.

Phillips graduated from the University of Wales in 1955. She entered RADA with a scholarship in September 1955, the same year as Diana Rigg and Glenda Jackson. She won the Bancroft Gold Medal for Hedda Gabler and was offered work in Hollywood when she left RADA. While still a student, she was offered three film contracts to work for an extended period of time in the United States, but she declined, preferring to work on stage.

== Career ==
=== Early career ===
Phillips began acting professionally at the age of 11 with the Home Service of BBC Radio in Wales. At the same age she won her first speech-and-drama award for her performance at the National Eisteddfod held at Llandybïe in 1944, where she and a school friend played the parts of two elderly men in a dramatic duologue.

She made her first British television appearance at 17 and won a Welsh acting award at 18. In 1953, while still a student at University College, Cardiff she worked as a newsreader and announcer for the BBC in Wales and toured Wales in Welsh-language productions of the Welsh Arts Council.

From 1953 to 1955, Phillips was a member of the BBC Repertory Company and the National Theatre Company and toured Wales performing Welsh and English plays for the Welsh Arts Council. For the Nottingham Playhouse in 1958, she was Masha in Three Sisters. She performed as Princess Siwan in Saunders Lewis's The King's Daughter at the Hampstead Theatre Club in 1959 and as Katherine in Taming of the Shrew for the Oxford Playhouse in 1960. She was Princess Siwan again in the BBC's production of Siwan: The King's Daughter alongside Peter O'Toole with Emyr Humphrys as producer. It was broadcast on BBC One (Wales only) on 1 March 1960. From October 1958 to April 1959, she was compere of the Land of Song (Gwlad y Gân) monthly programme at TWW (Television Wales and the West) Channel 10 with baritone Ivor Emmanuel.

She made her first appearance on the London stage in 1957 when she appeared in Hermann Sudermann's Magda for RADA. Magda, about an opera diva, was her first real success in London. The play did well and benefited her career greatly; although she was only a student at the time, she was the first since Sarah Bernhardt to play the role.

In 1957, Phillips performed the title role in Ibsen's Hedda Gabler, which had its West End opening at The Duke of York's Theatre, December 3, 1957, with Fredrik Ohlsson as Tesman. They also performed at Det Nye Teatret in Oslo and at The Vanbrugh, RADA. Many sources consider this her London stage debut, but she did Magda before Hedda Gabler. In September 1958, she was performing as Margaret Muir in John Hall's The Holiday at Oxford New Theatre.

In May 1958, Phillips performed as Joan in a production of Shaw's Saint Joan by Bryan Bailey, at the Belgrade Theatre in Coventry, which had opened just six weeks before. An observer described her performance:

Sian Phillips' portrayal of Joan defies the law of averages, since, after seeing Siobhan McKenna in the 1955 Arts Theatre production, I reckoned it impossible to equal within half a century. Like the Irish girl, the Welsh girl is perfect ... "This girl doesn't act Joan – she is Joan." In short, perfection.

She was Julia in the Royal Shakespeare Company's 1960–1961 version of The Duchess of Malfi. Her Royal Shakespeare Company performances are:

- Julia in The Duchess of Malfi: at the Shakespeare Memorial Theatre (Stratford, 30 November 1960, opening night).
- Julia in The Duchess of Malfi: at the Aldwych Theatre (London, 15 December 1960, opening night)
- Bertha in Ondine: at the Aldwych Theatre (London, 12 January 1961, opening night)
- Miss Havisham in Great Expectations: at Royal Shakespeare Company (Stratford, 6 December 2005).

=== Later film and television ===
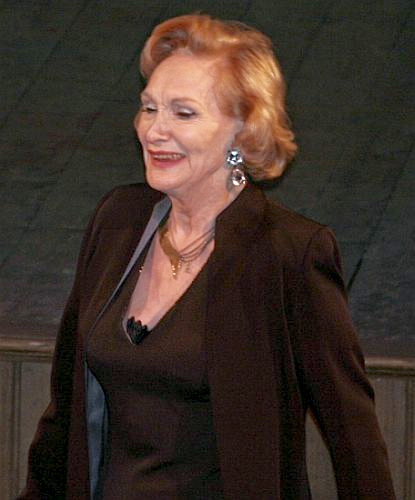
Phillips at Wilton's Music Hall in London in 2011

Her long career has included many films and television programmes, but she is perhaps best known for starring as Livia in the popular BBC adaptation of Robert Graves's novel I, Claudius (BBC2, 1976), for which she won the 1977 BAFTA Television Award for Best Actress, and for many appearances on the original run of Call My Bluff. She also appeared opposite her then-husband Peter O'Toole and Richard Burton in Becket (1964); as Ursula Mossbank in the musical film Goodbye, Mr. Chips (1969), again starring O'Toole; once more opposite O'Toole in Murphy's War (1971); as Emmeline Pankhurst in the TV mini-series Shoulder to Shoulder (1974); as Beth Morgan in the TV series How Green Was My Valley (1975); as Clementine Churchill in Southern Television's Winston Churchill: The Wilderness Years (1981) starring Robert Hardy; as Lady Ann, the unfaithful wife of Alec Guinness's character George Smiley, in the BBC1 espionage dramas Tinker, Tailor, Soldier, Spy (1979) and Smiley's People (1982), adapted from John le Carré's eponymous novels; in Nijinsky (1980); and as the queen Cassiopeia in Clash of the Titans (1981).

Another popular role was that of the Reverend Mother Gaius Helen Mohiam in David Lynch's Dune (1984) and Charal from Ewoks: The Battle for Endor (1985). She also appeared in seasons 2 and 4 (1998 and 2000) of the Canadian TV series La Femme Nikita as Adrian, the renegade founder of the powerful Section One anti-terrorist organisation. In 2001, she appeared as herself in Lily Savage's Blankety Blank. and in Ballykissangel as faith healer Consuela Dunphy in Episode 7 ('One Born Every Minute' or 'Getting Better All the Time'). Her most recent film is The Gigolos (2006) by Richard Bracewell, in which she played Lady James. In 2010, she appeared in New Tricks in the episode "Coming out Ball", and in 2011 she appeared in the episode "Wild Justice" in the fifth season of the television series Lewis. In 2017, she played Lady Yvette Bristow in the TV series Strike. In 2022, she appeared in the series McDonald & Dodds. In 2024, Phillips portrayed Enid Meadows in the Doctor Who episode "73 Yards".

=== Other work ===
Phillips's West End credits include Marlene (in which she portrayed Marlene Dietrich), Pal Joey, Gigi and A Little Night Music. She has also appeared on the American stage in Marlene.

Her National Theatre performances have included playing the roles of Lady Britomart in Major Barbara at the Lyttelton Theatre (18 October 1982, opening night); Madam Armfeldt in A Little Night Music at the Olivier Theatre (18 September 1995, opening night); Hope in In Bed With Magritte (1 December 1995, opening night); and Madame Neilsen in "Les Blancs" at the Olivier Theatre in 2016.

She provided spoken-word backing to a track on Rufus Wainwright's 2007 album Release the Stars and appeared live with him at the Old Vic Theatre in London in 2007. In 2009, Phillips starred in London's West End production of Calendar Girls. Phillips played Juliet opposite Michael Byrne's Romeo in Juliet and her Romeo at the Bristol Old Vic from 10 March to 24 April 2010.

In January 2011, she appeared in a new cabaret show, Crossing Borders, at Wilton's Music Hall in London. One review said: "Her cabaret shows are always of the more traditional type. She's had a long and very impressive career, and her show followed its progression, with backstage anecdotes about the people she's met and worked with along the way. It may not be edgy, but it's a truly delightful evening, by a truly delightful performer, in a truly delightful venue."

In 2015, she played the lead character Fania Fénelon in the Arthur Miller stage version of Playing for Time at Sheffield Theatres.

In 2024, Phillips reflected on her life and career, for the first time, in Siân Phillips at 90, broadcast on BBC One on 1 March. The documentary includes Phillips recounting, with candour, the difficulties in the later part of her marriage to O'Toole, which culminated in the ultimatum that she should leave the family home, without their two children, within the space of four hours.

In 2026 she appeared in "The Greeks" at the Tabard Theatre in London.

Phillips was due to play the role of the older Briony Tallis in Chichester Festival Theatre's world premiere adaptation of Atonement from 29 May to 20 June 2026 but withdrew from it shortly before it opened, expressing her "heartfelt regret" at doing so. No reason was given at the time for her stepping down and the part was instead taken by Jessica Turner. However, in August 2026 Phillips told The Times that she had struggled to remember her lines during rehearsals for the production and that, as a result, she had decided to retire from full-scale stage acting but would still take part in smaller productions. She said she would continue performing in her show It's All Greek and planned to appear in Samuel Beckett's Rockaby in 2027.

== Accolades and honours ==
=== Awards and nominations ===
Year	Award	Category	Nominated work	Result	Ref
1969	Golden Globe Award	Best Supporting Actress	Goodbye, Mr. Chips	Nominated	
1970	National Society of Film Critics	Best Supporting Actress	Goodbye, Mr. Chips	Won	
1976	BAFTA TV Award	Best Actress	I, Claudius and How Green Was My Valley	Won	
1977	Royal Television Society	Best Performance	I, Claudius	Won	
1980	Olivier Award	Best Actress in a Musical	Pal Joey	Nominated	
1996	Olivier Award	Best Supporting Performance in a Musical	A Little Night Music	Nominated	
1998	Olivier Award	Best Actress in a Musical	Marlene	Nominated	
1999	Tony Award	Best Actress in a Musical	Marlene	Nominated	
2001	BAFTA Cymru (Wales)	Special Award	Siân Phillips	Won	
2013	Olivier Award	Best Supporting Performance in a Musical	Cabaret	Nominated	

In January 2018, Phillips was recognised for her career spanning more than 70 years at the BBC Audio Drama Awards, and was given a Radio Lifetime Achievement Award.

=== Honours ===
Phillips was appointed Commander of the Order of the British Empire (CBE) in the 2000 Birthday Honours and Dame Commander of the Order of the British Empire (DBE) in the 2016 New Year Honours for services to drama.

Since 2005, the British Academy of Film and Television Arts Cymru (BAFTA in Wales) has presented the Tlws Sian Phillips Award to a Welshman or woman who has made a significant contribution in either a major feature film or network television programme.

In 2024, Phillips and Judi Dench became the first female members of the Garrick Club.

== Personal life ==
Phillips's first husband was Donald Roy, a post-graduate student at the University of Wales, who later established the Drama Department at the University of Hull and after whom the University Theatre is named. They were married in 1956 and divorced in 1959.

Already pregnant with their first child, Phillips married Peter O'Toole in December 1959. They had two daughters, including Kate O'Toole. The couple divorced in 1979, and Phillips wrote about this tempestuous period of her life in Public Places, the second volume of her autobiography.

Her third husband was actor Robin Sachs, who was 17 years her junior. Their relationship began in 1975. They were married on Christmas Eve 1979, shortly after her divorce from O'Toole. Phillips and Sachs divorced in 1991.

Her grandaunt was the Welsh evangelist Rosina Davies.

She is a patron of the Bird College of Dance, Music & Theatre Performance, based in Sidcup, Greater London.

Her two volumes of autobiography – Private Faces and Public Places – were published in 1999 and 2001, respectively.

== Filmography ==
=== Film ===
Year	Title	Role	Notes
1962	The Longest Day	WRNS Officer (Women's Royal Naval Service)	
1964	Becket	Gwendolen	
1965	Young Cassidy	Ella	
1969	Laughter in the Dark	Lady Pamela More	
1969	Goodbye, Mr. Chips	Ursula Mossbank	
1971	Murphy's War	Hayden	
1971	Under Milk Wood	Mrs. Ogmore-Pritchard	
1975	The Puritan Experience: Making of a New World	Anne Higgins	
1975	The Puritan Experience: Forsaking England	Anne Higgins	
1980	Nijinsky	Lady Ripon	
1981	Clash of the Titans	Cassiopeia	
1984	Dune	Reverend Mother Gaius Helen Mohiam	
1985	The Doctor and the Devils	Annabella Rock	
1989	Valmont	Madame de Volanges	
1993	The Age of Innocence	Mrs. Archer	
1997	House of America	Mam	
2006	The Gigolos	Baroness James	
2012	Bella Fleace Gave a Party	Bella	
2012	Lovesong	(Older)Maggie	
2013	Stray	Mary	
2016	La Lune Folle	Miss Dubois	
2016	Checkmate	Prosperity	
2017	Hochelaga, Land of Souls	Sarah Walker	
2018	Voyageuse	Erica	Voice
2018	Miss Dalí	Anna Maria	
2019	Be Happy!	Maria	
2019	Time & Again	Eleanor	
2019	The Magicians House: The Steps up the Chimney	Narrator	
2020	Dream Horse	Maureen	
2020	National Theatre at Home: Les Blancs	Madame Neilsen	
2020	Summerland	Margaret Corey	
2020	A Christmas Carol	Narrator / Grandmother	
2021	National Theatre Live: Under Milk Wood	Mrs. Utah Watkins / Polly Garter / Mrs. Beyon	
2021	Through the Looking Glass	Violet	
2025	The Next Morning	Grandmother	
2026	Frank and Percy †		Post-production
2026	1 in 2 †	Aneurin Bevan	Voice, Post-production
TBA	Seeking Perfection †	Grandmother	Post-production

=== Television ===
Year	Title	Role	Notes
1958	Television Playwright	Alice Blackwell	Episode: "A Game for Eskimos"
1958	Granite	Judith	TV film
1959	A Quiet Man	Megan	TV film
1959-1964	ITV Play of the Week	Dona Ana / Anna Mahr / Imogen Gresham / Kate Grant	4 episodes
1959	BBC Sunday Night Theatre	Countess Else von Dietlof	Episode: "Treason"
1959	ITV Television Playhouse	Barbara	Episode: "The Breaking Point"
1960	Siwan the Kings Daughter	Siwan	TV film
1961	Armchair Theatre	—N/a	Episode: "Strangers in the Room"
1961	Theatre Night	Bertha	Episode: "Onedine"
1963	It Happened Like This	Paula	Episode: "Coincidence"
1963	Drama 61-67	Carole Blair	Episode: "Drama '63: This Is Not King's Cross"
1964	Espionage	Anna	Episode: "A Free Agent"
1966	Eh, Joe?	Woman's voice	TV short
1968	City '68	Jo	Episode: "It's Dearer After Midnight"
1968	Half Hour Story	A Girl	Episode: "Thief"
1969	ITV Playhouse	May Bartram	Episode: "Beast in the Jungle"
1970	W. Somerset Maugham	Martha Jones	Episode: "Beast in the Jungle"
1971-1977	BBC Play of the Month	The Duchesse of Berwich / Anna Voinitseva, widow / Hesione Hushabye	3 episodes
1972	The Man Outside	Sarah Peplow	Episode: "Intruders"
1972	ITV Saturday Night Theatre	Sally Stirling	Episode: "Sharing the Honours"
1974	Jennie: Lady Randolph Churchill	Mrs. Patrick Campbell	Episode: "His Borrowed Plumes"
1974	Shoulder to Shoulder	Emmeline Pankhurst	6 episodes
1975	How Green Was My Valley	Beth Morgan	6 episodes
1976	I, Claudius	Livia	8 episodes
1978	Warrior Queen	Queen Boudicca	6 episodes
1978	Off to Philadelphia in the Morning	Lina Van Elyn	2 episodes
1979	Barriers	Mrs Dalgleish	2 episodes
1979	Tinker Tailor Soldier Spy	Ann Smiley	
1980	Tales of the Unexpected	Hermione Carpenter	Episode: "Back for Christmas"
1981	Winston Churchill: The Wilderness Years	Clementine Churchill	
1982	Smiley's People	Ann Smiley	
1985	Ewoks: The Battle for Endor	Charal	TV film
1987	A Killing on the Exchange	Isobel Makepeace	
1987	The Two Mrs. Grenvilles	Duchess of Windsor	
1991	The Chestnut Soldier	Nain	
1992	The Borrowers	Mrs. Driver	
1993	Heidi	Frau Sesemann	
1998	Alice through the Looking Glass	Red Queen	TV film
1998	La Femme Nikita	Adrian	2 episodes, 1998; 3 episodes, 2000
1998	The Scold's Bridle	Mathilda Gillespie	BBC TV Drama
1999	Aristocrats	Narrator / Older Lady Emily Lennox	TV Mini Series
2001	Ballykissangel	Consuela Dunphy	Episode: "Getting Better All the Time"
2003	The Last Detective	Vera Dulciman	Episode: "Moonlight"
2003	Arena	Narrator	Episode: "Alec Guinness: A Secret Man"
2005	The Murder Room	Marie Strickland	2 episodes
2006	Midsomer Murders	Lady Annabel Butler	Episode: "Vixen's Run"
2007	Kitchen	Morag White	TV film
2007	Holby City	Lily Sinclair	Episode: "Something's Gotta Give"
2008	Agatha Christie's Poirot	Mrs. Upward	Episode: "Mrs McGinty's Dead"
2008	Shortland Street	Vivienne Lindstrom	2 episodes
2010	Missing	Beth Murphy	Episode: #2.7
2010	New Tricks	Lady Elizabeth Linden Warner	Episode: "Coming Out Ball"
2011	Lewis	Adele Goffe	Episode: "Wild Justice"
2013	Playhouse Presents	May	Episode: "Gifted"
2014	Under Milk Wood	Mrs. Pugh	TV film
2017	Casualty	Bridget Haas	Episode: "Reap the Whirlwind - Part One"
2017	Strike	Lady Yvette Bristow	2 episodes
2018	Doctors	Joan Bartlett	Episode: "Face-Off"
2020–2021	Keeping Faith	Judge Owens	4 episodes
2021	Silent Witness	Beattie Elleston	2 episodes
2022	McDonald & Dodds	Agnes Gillian	Episode: "Belvedere"
2023	Good Omens	Mrs. Henderson	Episode: #2.4
2023	The Chelsea Detective	Grandma Dix	Episode: #2.3
2024	Doctor Who	Enid Meadows	Episode: "73 Yards"

=== Video games ===
Year	Title	Role	Notes
2018	Ni no Kuni II: Revenant Kingdom	Boddly	Voice
2020	World of Warcraft: Shadowlands	Overseer Kah-Delen	Voice
