= Landmark Productions =

Theatrical production company from Dublin, Ireland

Landmark Productions is a theatre production company in Dublin, Ireland, founded in 2003 by Anne Clarke. The company has forged partnerships with writers and other companies, and has toured its shows in Ireland and internationally. Both the company and Clarke have received awards in the Irish Times Theatre Awards.

== History ==
Landmark Productions was established in 2003 by Anne Clarke.

== Partnerships and touring ==
Landmark Productions has an association with several Irish writers, including Enda Walsh and Paul Howard, the creator of Ross O'Carroll-Kelly. It produces plays in Ireland and tours Irish work abroad.

The company has forged partnerships with arts institutions in Ireland and internationally. Main partners in Ireland include Galway International Arts Festival, the Gaiety Theatre, Olympia Theatre, Project Arts Centre, Dublin Theatre Festival, the Abbey Theatre, and the Everyman together with Irish National Opera and its precursor, Wide Open Opera.

Landmark has also toured shows internationally to venues including St. Ann's Warehouse, Irish Arts Center, and the Brooklyn Academy of Music in New York City; the Barbican Theatre, the National Theatre, and Royal Opera House in London, UK; and at Edinburgh Festival Fringe and Edinburgh International Festival in Scotland.

A film version of The Last Hotel, co-produced with Brink Films and Wide Open Opera, was broadcast on Sky Arts in 2016.

== Awards ==
In 2011, Landmark Productions received the Judges' Special Award in the Irish Times Theatre Awards in recognition of its "sustained excellence in programming and for developing imaginative partnerships to bring quality to the Irish and international stage".

In 2015, Anne Clarke received the Special Tribute Award at the Irish Times Theatre Awards for her "work as a producer of world-class theatre in the independent sector in Ireland".

== Notable productions ==
- Krapp's Last Tape (Stephen Rea), directed by Vicky Featherstone; playing first in Dublin in October 2024, before touring to the Adelaide Festival Centre in Australia in February–March 2025 and the Barbican Theatre in London in April–May 2025
- Walking with Ghosts (Gabriel Byrne), world premiere - 2022
- Ulysses 2.2 (curated, presented and produced with ANU and MoLI), world premiere - 2022
- Straight to Video (Emmet Kirwan), world premiere - 2021
- The First Child (Donnacha Dennehy/Enda Walsh), world premiere - co-produced with Irish National Opera - 2021
- The Book of Names (co-produced with ANU), world premiere - 2021
- Backwards up a Rainbow (Rosaleen Linehan and Fergus Linehan), world premiere - 2021
- Medicine (Enda Walsh), world premiere - co-produced with Galway International Arts Festival - 2021
- The Saviour (Deirdre Kinahan), world premiere - 2021
- Happy Days (Samuel Beckett) starring Siobhán McSweeney and Marty Rea - 2021
- Theatre For One (and a Little One) (Roddy Doyle, Sonya Kelly, Louis Lovett, Pauline McLynn), world premiere - co-produced with Octopus Theatricals - 2020
- Blood in the Dirt (Rory Gleeson) - co-produced with Keynote - world premiere- 2019
- Theatre for One (Marina Carr, Stacey Gregg, Emmet Kirwan, Louise Lowe, Mark O'Rowe, Enda Walsh), world premiere - co-produced with Octopus Theatricals - 2019
- Asking for It (by Louise O’Neill, adapted by Meadhbh McHugh in collaboration with Annabelle Comyn), world premiere - co-produced with The Everyman in association with the Abbey Theatre - 2018
- Grief is the Thing with Feathers (by Max Porter, adapted and directed by Enda Walsh), world premiere, produced by Complicité and Wayward Productions in association with Landmark Productions and Galway International Arts Festival – 2018
- The Approach (Mark O’Rowe), world premiere – 2018
- The Second Violinist (Donnacha Dennehy/Enda Walsh), world premiere, Irish Times Irish Theatre Awards winner for Best Opera Production, co-produced with Irish National Opera – 2017
- Woyzeck in Winter (adapted by Conall Morrison with lyrics by Stephen Clark), world premiere, nominated for six Irish Times Theatre Awards, including Best Production, winning two – Best Actor for Patrick O’Kane and Best Supporting Actress for Rosaleen Linehan – 2017
- Ross O’Carroll-Kelly: Postcards from the Ledge (Paul Howard), world premiere, one-man show starring Rory Nolan, who has played Ross in all the stage shows to date – 2017
- Arlington (Enda Walsh), world premiere, starring Charlie Murphy, Hugh O’Conor, and Oona Doherty – 2016
- The Walworth Farce (Enda Walsh), starring Brendan Gleeson, Brian Gleeson and Domhnall Gleeson – 2015
- The Last Hotel (Enda Walsh/Donnacha Dennehy), world premiere, Irish Times Theatre Award for Best Opera Production, co-produced with Irish National Opera – 2015
- Once (Enda Walsh) – 2015, 2016, 2017
- Ballyturk (Enda Walsh), world premiere, starring Mikel Murfi, Cillian Murphy and Stephen Rea; Irish Times Theatre Award winner for Best Production, co-produced with Galway International Arts Festival. In a subsequent revival, which toured St. Ann’s Warehouse in New York, the part originally played by Stephen Rea was played by the actress Olwen Fouéré. – 2014 and 2017
- Ross O’Carroll-Kelly: Breaking Dad (Paul Howard), world premiere – 2014
- These Halcyon Days (Deirdre Kinahan) – 2013
- Howie the Rookie (Mark O’Rowe), Irish Times Theatre Award winner for Best Actor - Tom Vaughan-Lawlor – 2013
- The Talk of the Town (Emma Donoghue), world premiere – 2012
- Greener (Fiona Looney), world premiere – 2012
- Testament (Colm Tóibín), world premiere – 2011
- Misterman (Enda Walsh), Irish Times Theatre Award winner for Best Actor – Cillian Murphy, co-produced by Galway International Arts Festival – 2011
- Ross O’Carroll-Kelly: Between Foxrock and a Hard Place (Paul Howard), world premiere – 2010
- October (Fiona Looney), world premiere – 2009
- Knives in Hens (David Harrower) – 2009
- Miss Julie (August Strindberg in a version by Frank McGuinness) – 2008
- Alice in Wonderland (Mary Elizabeth Burke-Kennedy) – 2008
- Ross O’Carroll-Kelly: The Last Days of the Celtic Tiger (Paul Howard), world premiere – 2007
- Sleeping Beauty (Rufus Norris) – 2007
- Blackbird (David Harrower) – 2007
- Underneath the Lintel (Glen Berger) – 2006
- The Secret Garden (Frances Hodgson Burnett, dramatised by Neil Duffield) – 2006
- Edward Albee’s The Goat, or Who is Sylvia? – 2005
- Dandelions (Fiona Looney), world premiere, starring Pauline McLynn and Deirdre O’Kane – 2005
- Skylight (David Hare) – 2004
