= Anne Clarke (theatre producer) =

Irish theatre producer

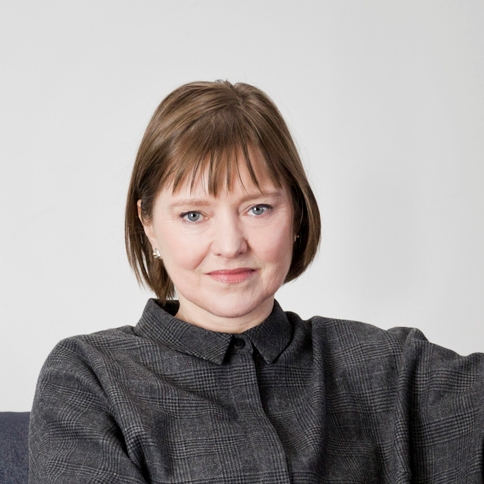
- Born: 13 April 1961 (age 64)

Anne Clarke (born 13 April 1961) is an Irish theatre producer. She founded Landmark Productions in 2003.

She was awarded the Special Tribute Award in the Irish Times Theatre Awards for 2015, 'in recognition of her extraordinary work as a producer of world-class theatre in the independent sector in Ireland'. At the awards ceremony, a tribute video was played, which featured contributions from writer Enda Walsh and actors Cillian Murphy, Tom Vaughan-Lawlor, Brendan Gleeson, Brian Gleeson and Domhnall Gleeson, amongst others.

Her recent work includes the world premieres of Mark O’Rowe’s The Approach (chosen by Lyn Gardner in The Independent as one of the top picks for the Edinburgh Fringe 2018) and Asking for It, of which the book’s author, Louise O’Neill, said: 'nothing could have prepared me for what I saw on that stage.’
