= Eva O'Connor =

Irish actress and playwright

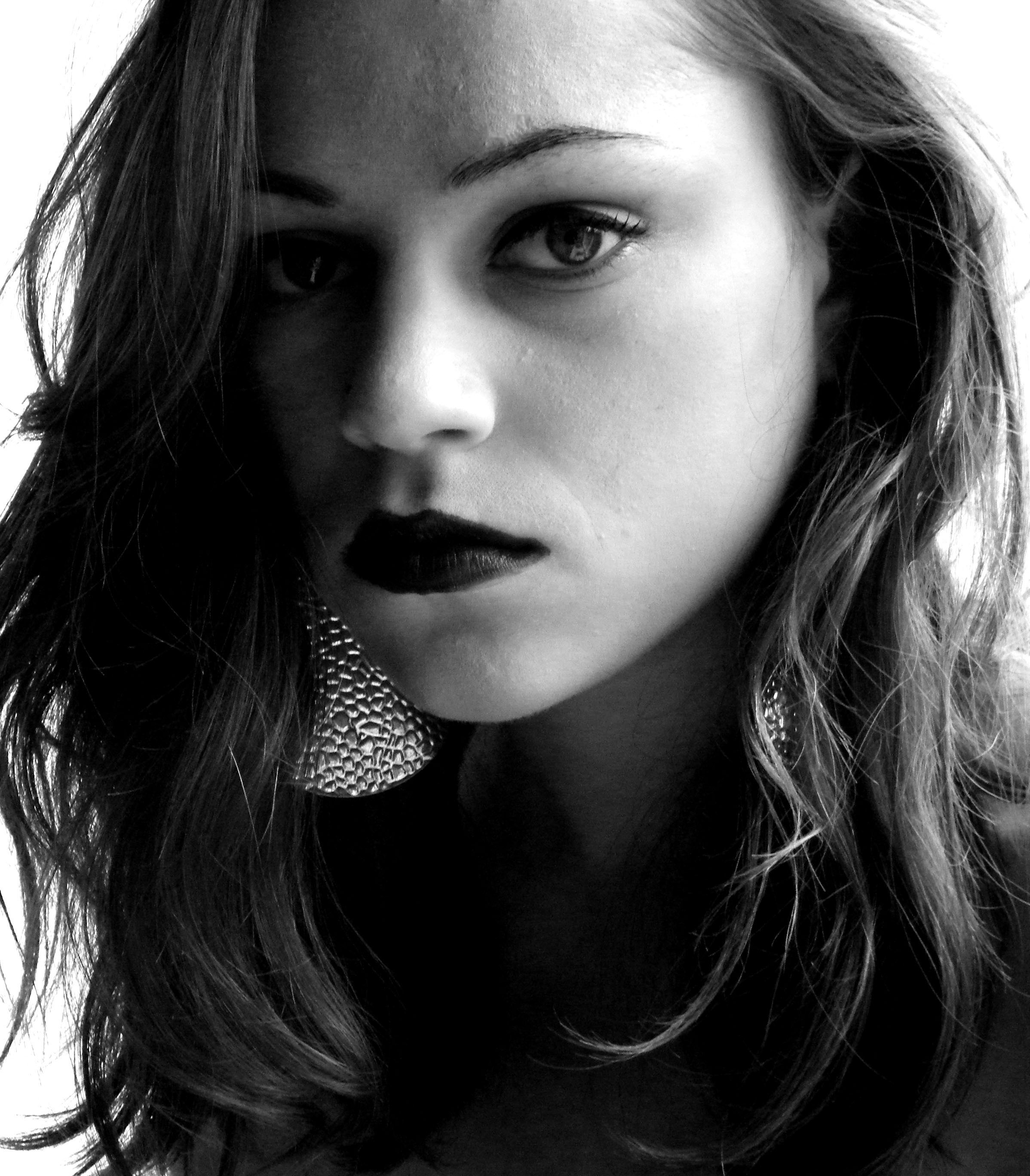
- O'Connor in Clinical Lies
- Occupation: Actress
- Years active: 2009–present

Eva O'Connor is an Irish stage actress and playwright.

== Career ==
O'Connor's play My Name Is Saoirse—a one-woman show in which she starred—was performed at the 2014 Edinburgh Fringe and 2014 Dublin Fringe Festival. The show won the First Fortnight Award at the latter; the prize included a performance at the following year's festival.

She wrote and performed shows in each of the four years 2010–2013 at the Edinburgh Fringe: Clinical Lies in 2010; My Best Friend Drowned in a Swimming Pool in 2011; National Student Drama Festival award winner Kiss Me and You Will See How Important I Am in 2012; and Substance in 2013.

For her performance in Broken Croí, Heart Briste during the 2009 Dublin Fringe Festival, she was nominated for Best Supporting Actress at that years Irish Times Theatre Awards.

Her short story The Midnight Sandwich was written for BBC Radio 4: her reading of it was broadcast in October 2017.

=== Overshadowed ===
O'Connor's play Overshadowed was first performed in 2015 at the Tiger Dublin Fringe, where it was awarded the Fishamble Award for Best New Writing; it subsequently appeared at the 2016 First Fortnight and Edinburgh Fringe festivals and toured Ireland in October 2016. A year later, in October 2017, BBC 3 broadcast an eight-episode drama based on Overshadowed. Later that month she discussed its portrayal of anorexia on television with Hadley Freeman on BBC Radio 4's Front Row.

Reviewing Overshadowed for The Independent, Kate Leaver wrote that "in a brand new TV show out this week on BBC3 […] anorexia is actually personified. The illness is played by one of the writers of the show, Eva O'Connor, and it works quite effectively to demonstrate that an eating disorder is separate from the person it latches onto." In a report for The Irish Times on the adaptation of Overshadowed into a television show for BBC3, Shilpa Ganatra writes the play has "morphed along the way: with her first-hand experience on the subject, O’Connor plays a personification of anorexia – a whisper in the ear, a destructive thought that just won’t quit".

=== Maz and Bricks ===
O'Connor wrote the play Maz and Bricks about abortion rights, and it was first performed in 2017. In a review for the Irish Independent, Meadhbh McGrath writes, "O’Connor has a powerful skill for delivering searing monologues, but the success of the play rests on the strength of the two characters on stage, and there is a striking imbalance." In a 2017 review in The Irish Times, Peter Crawley writes, "O'Connor's play, in narrative and style, is explicitly concerned with problems of connection and contrivance," and about her acting, "O'Connor conveys more about connection and loss in its modest moments, though, when her characters possess both rhyme and reason." In 2020, O'Connor performed the role of Maz in an off-Broadway version of the play directed by Jim Culleton. Laura Collins-Hughes writes about the main characters in a 2020 review for The New York Times, "They speak of their separate traumas in monologues peppered with rhyme, which sounds natural in O’Brien's mouth, self-conscious in O'Connor's."

=== Mustard ===
In 2020, O'Connor performed Mustard, directed by Hildegard Ryan. Kate Wyver, in a review for The Guardian, writes, "O’Connor’s performance is strong and confident" and "O’Connor’s descriptions are fleshy and poetic; sinewy, clammy, though there are shards of the story [..] that want to be pushed deeper." Claire Brennan writes in a review for The Observer, "O'Connor tackles the subject of a woman struggling with self-harm and heartbreak bravely, but she hasn't yet quite managed to find the form for the material that will transform it into drama." In a review for The Irish Times, Amy O'Connor writes, "Eva O’Connor delivers a fiery performance that never wavers in its intensity" and states that "Her writing, too, is strong [..] packed with jokes and rich metaphors and she explores the issue of mental health with sensitivity and aplomb."
