= Ballyturk =

Play by Enda Walsh

Ballyturk is a play by Enda Walsh. Walsh states that Ballyturk should "‘bypass the intellect and go straight to the bones.’"

The play was first performed at the Black Box Theatre, Galway on July 14, 2014 in a co-production between Landmark Productions and the Galway International Arts Festival. and subsequently at the Olympia Theatre, Dublin, Cork Opera House and National Theatre in London. It was the winner of the award for Best Production at the 2015 Irish Times Theatre Awards The 2014 production starring Cillian Murphy has been compared to Dylan Thomas’s Under Milk Wood.

In 2017, the play was revived at the Abbey Theatre and in early 2018 played at St. Ann's Warehouse in Brooklyn, NY. In this revival - again produced by Landmark Productions and Galway International Arts Festival - Tadhg Murphy played 1, Mikel Murfi returned as 2 and Olwen Fouere played 3.

In 2025 Florence Carr-Jones directed a version of the play at The Old Vic Theatre in Bristol. The cast included Isaac Green (as 2), Joshua Hogan (as 3), and Tyler Pringle (as 1). The cast showed real empathy for the characters and immaculate comic timing.

== Synopsis ==
Two unnamed male characters (1, in his late 30s, and 2, in his mid-40s) live in a single-room dwelling and discuss an imaginary town in Ireland called Ballyturk. Later, the rear wall of the dwelling opens to reveal the outside world. A third, older, unnamed male (3) enters from the outside and explains that one must stay and the other leave. The wall closes with 3 outside. After deliberation, 1 leaves to join 3 and 2 stays. The wall reopens and 1 leaves. 2 stays and 1 is replaced in the dwelling by a seven-year-old girl.

== Original cast ==
- Cillian Murphy as 1
- Mikel Murfi as 2
- Stephen Rea as 3

and others
