= Corcadorca Theatre Company =

Irish former theatre company

The Corcadorca Theatre Company was an independent theatre company based in Cork, Ireland. It was founded in 1991, and closed in 2022.

The company specialises in site-specific theatre and produced its first show of this kind, A Christmas Carol, in Cork City Gaol in 1994. One of the best-known new works produced by Corcadorca was Disco Pigs (written for the company by Enda Walsh). It was first staged in Triskel Arts Centre starring Cillian Murphy and Eileen Walsh and toured worldwide in 1996 and 1997.

Among the company's site specific productions were: The Trial of Jesus on Patrick's Hill, A Midsummer Night's Dream in Fitzgerald's Park, the multi-stage The Merchant of Venice and Woyzeck at the Naval Base in Haulbowline.

In 2005, when Cork was European Capital of Culture, Corcadorca's Relocation programme saw off-site theatre companies from Poland, France and the UK stage a series of productions in city centre sites such as Elizabeth Fort, the Grand Parade and the city morgue.

Corcadorca also develops new Irish writing. Apart from Enda Walsh it has also produced new plays by Conal Creedon, Raymond Scannell Eamonn Sweeney, and Pat McCabe.

Corcadorca has been nominated for a number of Irish Times Theatre Awards, and has won four, including Best Play and Best Actress (Eileen and Catherine Walsh) for The Same, and Best Lighting and Best Soundscape for Caryl Churchill's Far Away.

In 2011, Corcadorca set up the Theatre Development Centre (TDC), a studio space based in Triskel Arts Centre, as a way of resourcing the theatre sector in the region. The TDC supports around thirty projects each year as well as running SHOW, an annual platform for work in development, every November.

The name of the company is from the Irish Corca Dhorcha, or "dark Corca". This is a play on Corca Dhuibhne, the Dingle Peninsula, portrayed (jokingly) as a backward area of country bumpkins in Myles na gCopaleen's An Béal Bocht.

The company announced its closure in October 2022.
