= Gary Duggan =

Irish playwright (born 1979)

- Born: March 14, 1979 (age 47); Dublin, Ireland
- Occupation: Playwright

Gary Duggan (born 14 March 1979) is an Irish playwright.

Born in Dublin in 1979, Duggan was raised in the North Dublin suburb of Donaghmede. He studied Media Production at Dublin Institute of Technology. Duggan began writing scripts at the age of 15 while attending Grange Community College in Donaghmede. His first staged work was a collection of monologues called Manhattan Whispers, staged as part of the Dublin Fringe Festival in 2001.

His first full-length play, Monged was produced by Fishamble Theatre Company in 2005 and won the Stewart Parker Trust Award for best debut play in 2006.

Duggan's second play, Dedalus Lounge, premiered as part of the 2006 Dublin Fringe Festival and was produced by Pageant Wagon Theatre Company.

Duggan's third play, Trans-Euro Express, also produced by Pageant Wagon Theatre Company, premiered at the Mill Theatre, Dundrum in November 2008.
