= Kostick =

Kostick, Kostik or Kostyk (Cyrillic: Костик) is the surname of the following notable people:

- Conor Kostick (born 1964), British historian and writer
- David Kostyk, a character in the fantasy novels Grishaverse
- Gavin Kostick, Irish playwright
- Ken Kostick (1953–2011), Canadian chef and television and radio personality
- Orest Kostyk (born 1999), Ukrainian footballer goalkeeper
