= Galway International Arts Festival =

Annual arts festival in Galway, Ireland

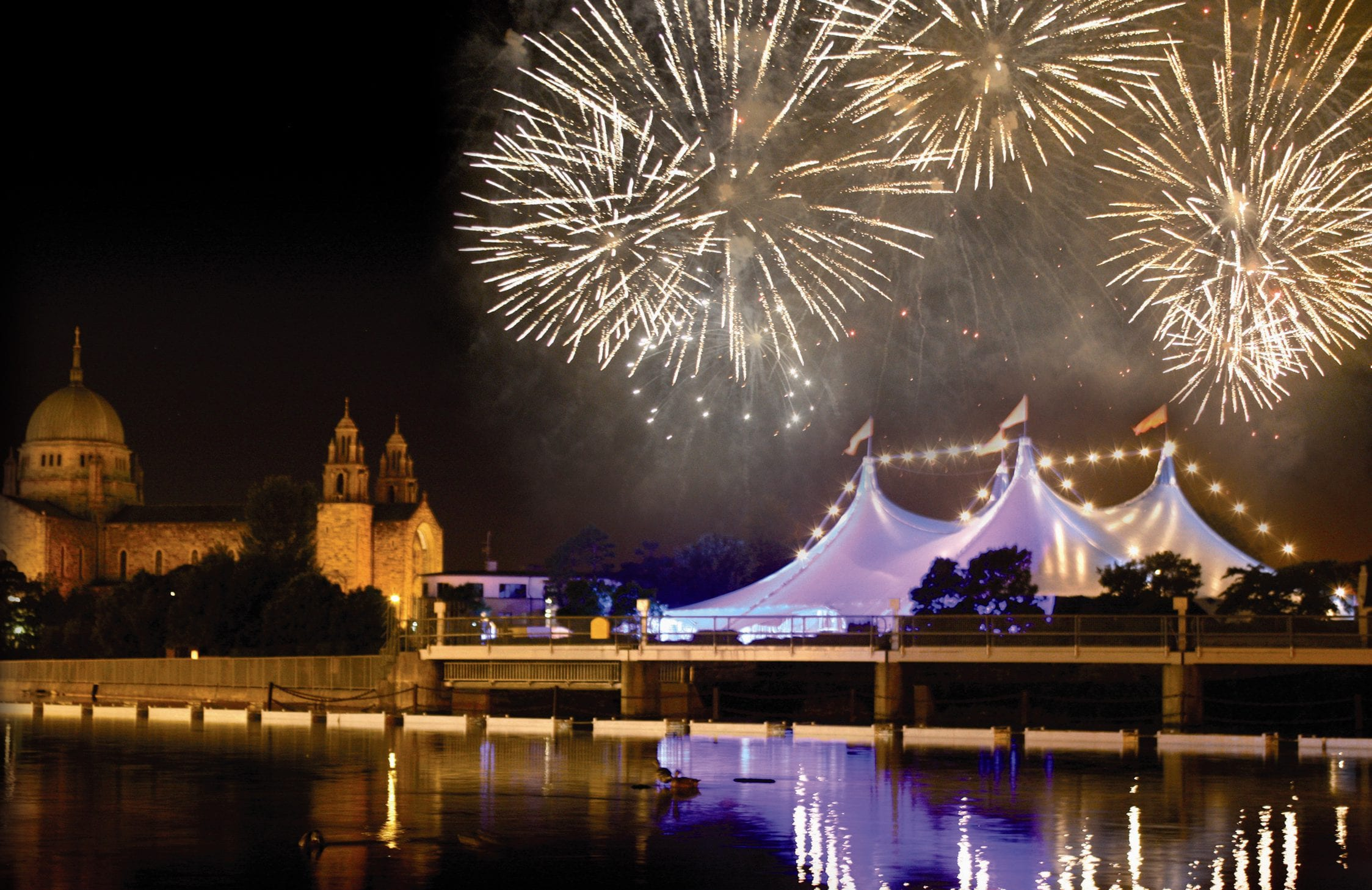
- Fireworks of Galway International Arts Festival
- Status: Active
- Genre: Arts
- Frequency: Annually
- Location: Galway
- Years active: 47–48
- Inaugurated: 1978
- Most recent: July 15, 2024
- Sponsors: Failte Ireland; University of Galway; Heineken; RTÉ; The Irish Times; Galway City Council
- Website: www.giaf.ie

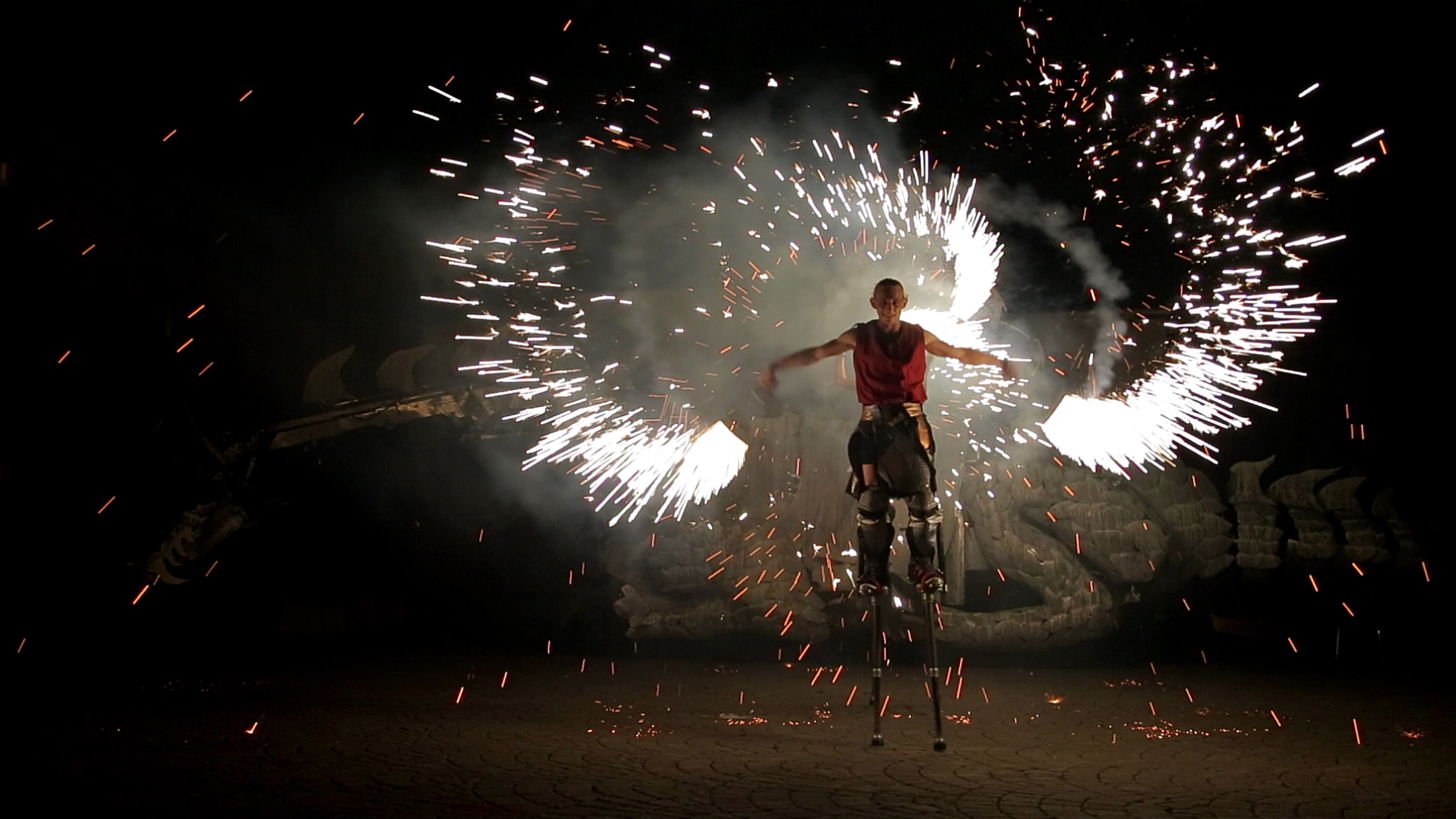
Dragonus takes to the streets of Galway for GIAF 2014

The Galway International Arts Festival (GIAF), founded in 1978, is a cultural organisation that produces an annual arts festival in Galway, Ireland. It also produces new work that tours nationally and internationally, in addition to presenting the discussion forum, "First Thought Talks". The festival maintains a non-profit status.

== History ==
The Galway Arts Festival organisation was founded in 1978 by University College Galway's Arts Society in collaboration with community activists from the Galway Arts Group. The first festival was described in local papers as "Galway Arts Society's Week of Craic". Their original budget was €1000 of Arts Council Funding and most of the artistic events were staged in an arts centre that now houses Sheridan's Cheesemongers.

The name was changed in 2014 to the Galway International Arts Festival to emphasize the diversity of contributors to the festival. The organization stated that the name change was intended to reflect both local and international programming, alongside a focus on producing works for national and international tours.

== Festival ==
The festival takes place in Galway for two weeks in late July. It presents and produces programmes across theatre, music, visual arts, opera, street spectacle, dance, discussion, and comedy. In 2018, festival attendance reached over 250,000, representing a 20% increase over the 2017 attendance figures. Over 600 artists created and took part in over 200 events across the festival. This 41st festival also featured a new Festival Garden in Eyre Square, offering pop-up performances and local food stands. The Festival Garden attracted more than 145,000 people. Visitors to the 2017 festival were estimated to be 45% from Galway, 18% around the rest of Ireland, and 37% outside of Ireland.

== Touring ==
The organisation has produced or co-produced more than 20 productions which have toured to London, New York, Edinburgh, Chicago, Adelaide, Sydney, Hong Kong, and Washington. These include four exhibition commissions. GIAF has also fostered a relationship with Landmark Productions, a Dublin-based production company. Together, they have produced multiple works written by or directed by Irish playwright Enda Walsh that have toured internationally.

== Music ==
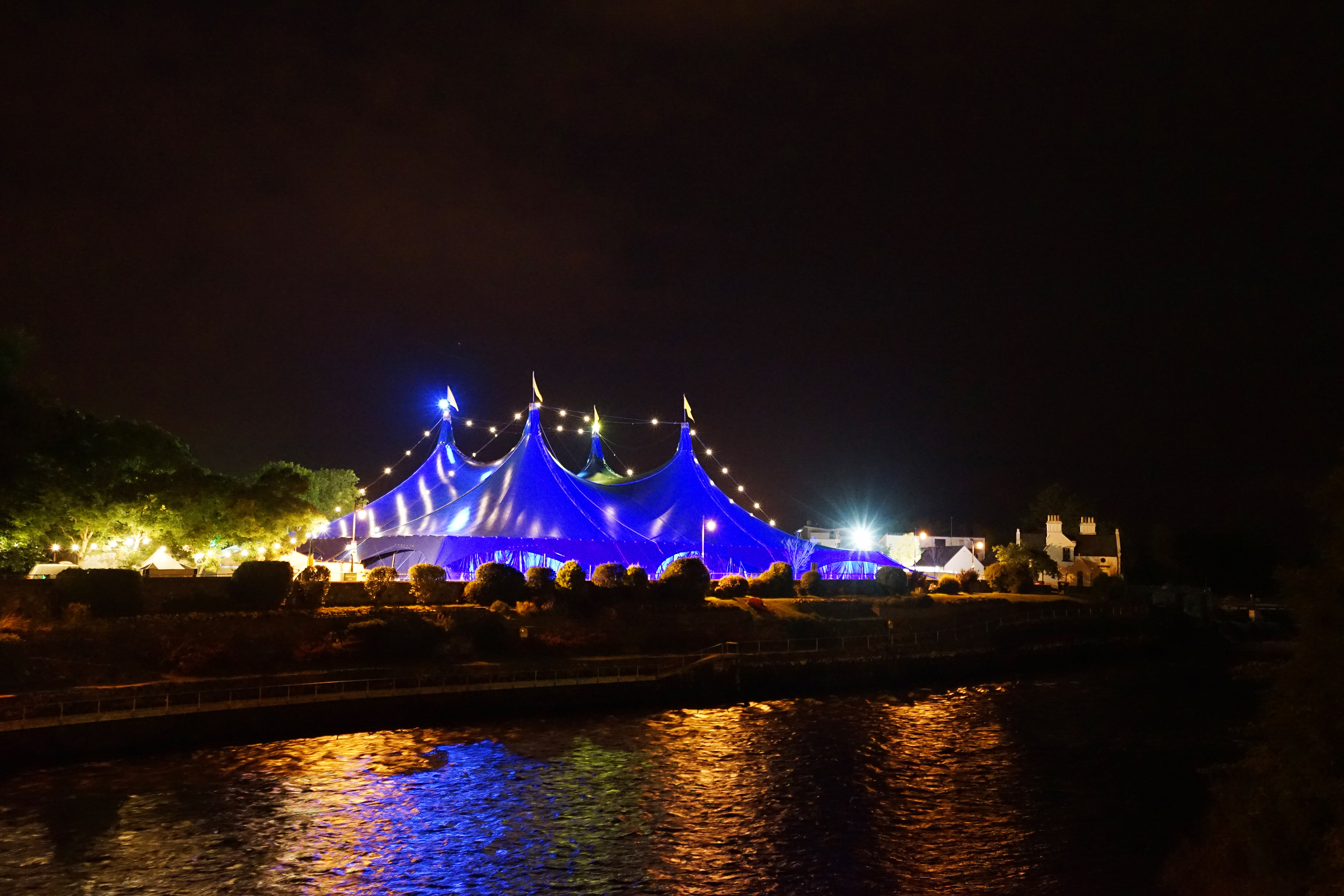
View of the Big Top at night

GIAF has hosted musical guests in their Big Top tent, erected yearly in the Fisheries Field on the campus of NUI Galway. GIAF has also partnered with local music and comedy venue Róisín Dubh for some of their programmed events. Performances in the music programme have included: Elvis Costello, Suede, The National, St. Vincent, Philip Glass, David Byrne, Blondie, Kronos Quartet, Brodsky Quartet and Bon Iver.

== Visual arts ==
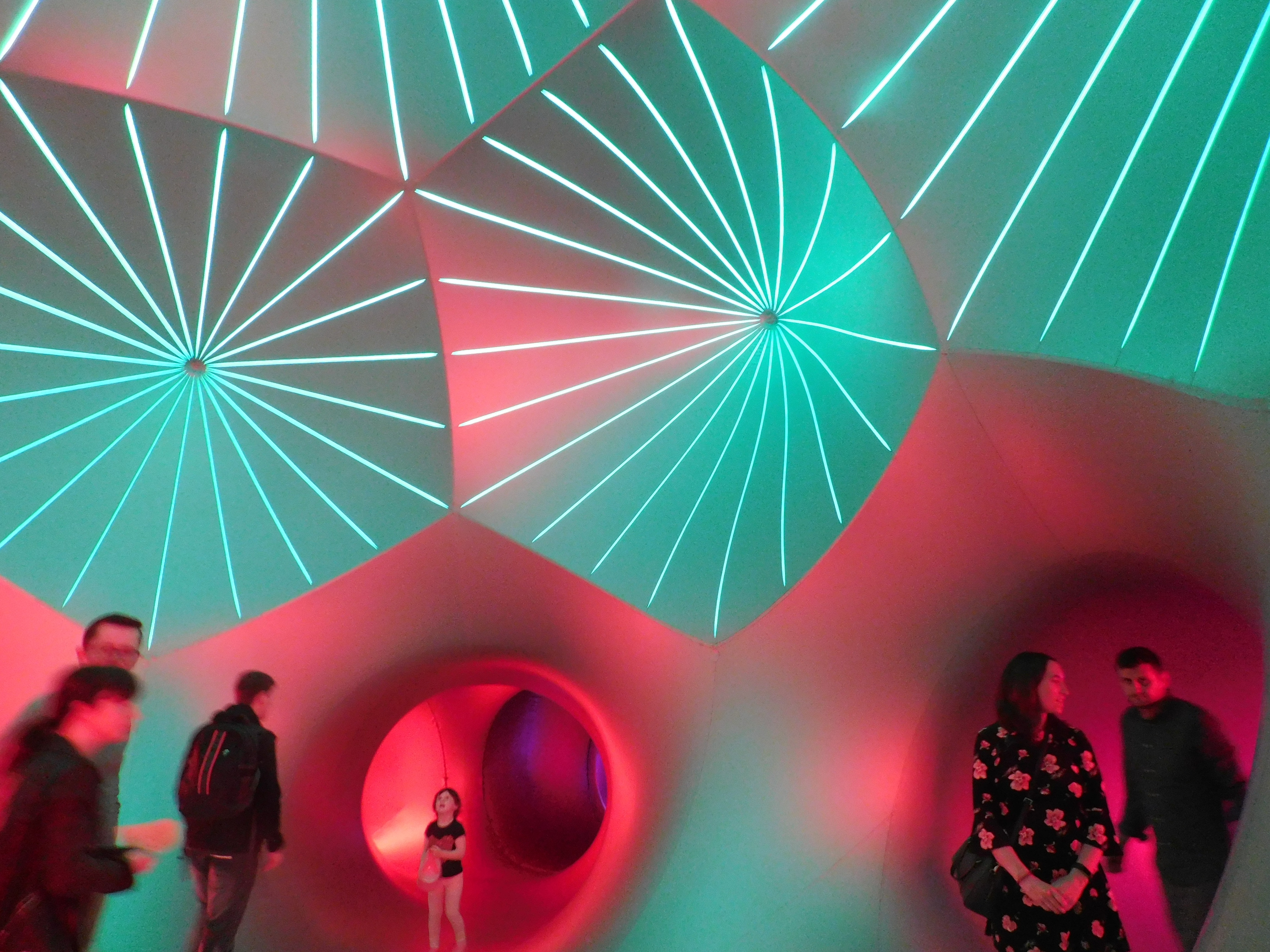
From inside Architects of Air's walk-in sculpture 'Miracoco Luminarium,' designed by Alan Parkinson and on display in Eyre Square during the 2018 festival.

Visual artists who have exhibited have included David Hockney, Bill Viola, Henri Matisse, Patricia Piccinini, Hughie O'Donoghue, David Mach and John Gerrard.

In 2018, GIAF introduced an internship program in the visual arts for 25 participants.

== Theatre and dance ==
Irish playwright Enda Walsh has featured in past GIAF line-ups. His first play, "Disco Pigs", which was also Cillian Murphy's first stage role, debuted at the festival in 1997. Walsh has since gone on to work with the festival to produce works ranging from operas to experimental staged 'rooms'. His 2014 play Ballyturk and 2011 play Misterman both debuted at the festival before staging subsequent runs abroad.

American actor John Mahoney was a frequent performer in the festival starting in 2000. Visiting international theatre and dance companies have included the National Theatre, Propeller, the Royal Court Theatre, Steppenwolf, Fabulous Beast Dance Company, Hofesh Shechter Dance Company, Michael Clark Company, Druid Theatre Company and the Bristol Old Vic.

== First Thought Talks ==
Starting in 2012, GIAF hosted a series of talks at each festival revolving around the festival's theme. The 2018 festival's First Thought Talks about 'Home' was opened by President Michael D. Higgins and was followed up by 43 other scholars, artists, scientists, and athletes, both Irish and international. A number of these talks are recorded and accessible online.

== Gallery ==
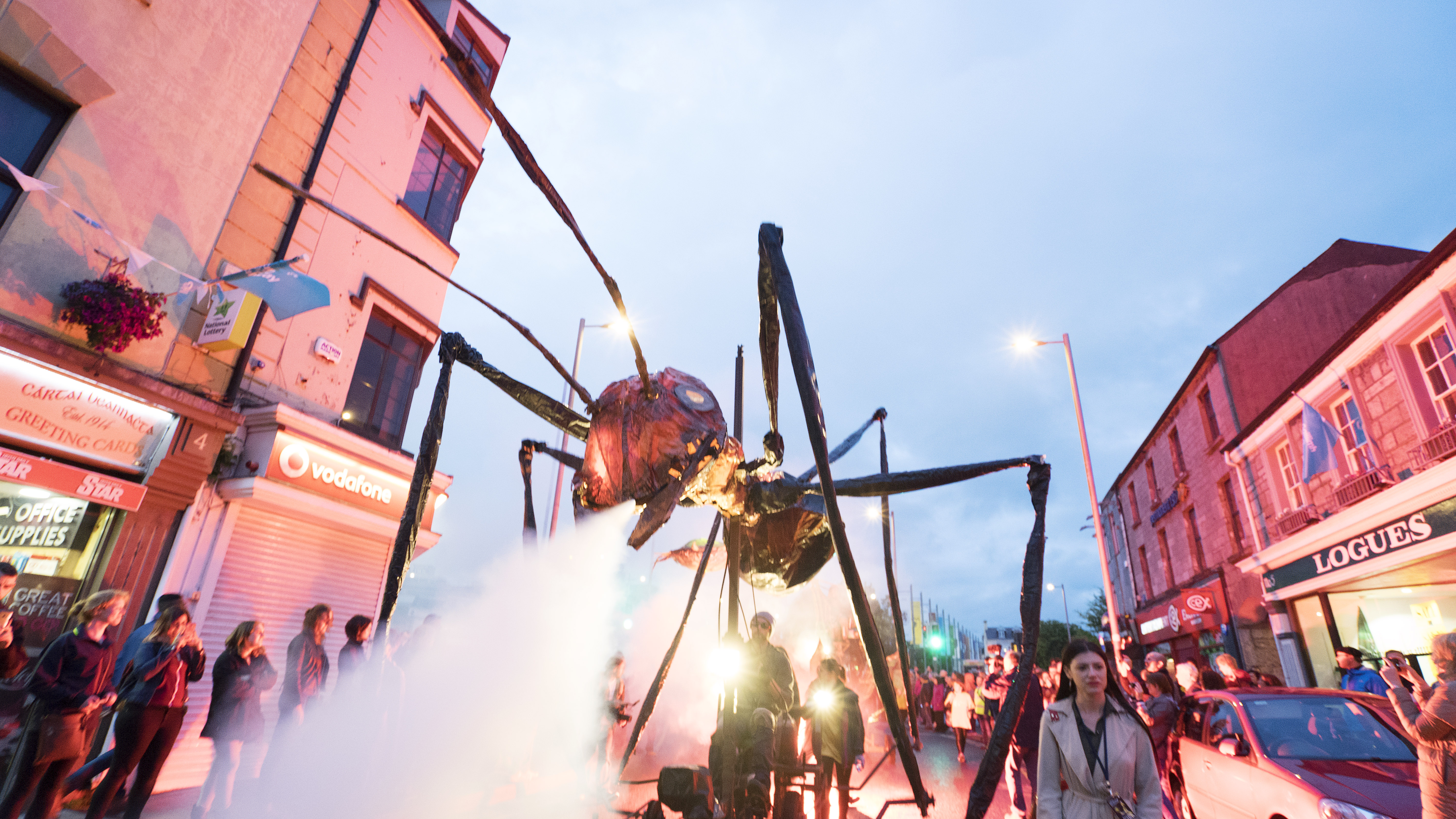
Street performance

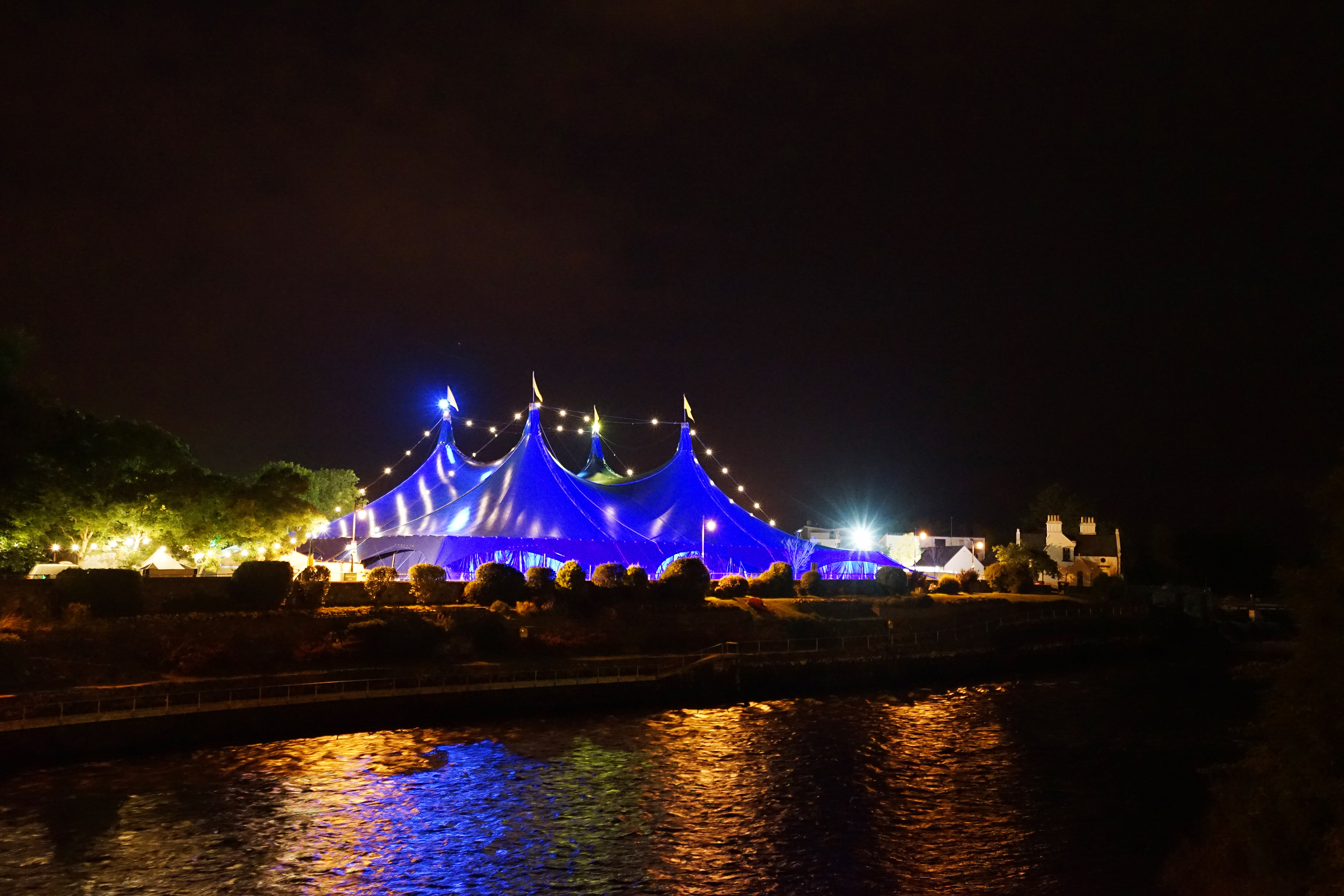
"Big Top" tent

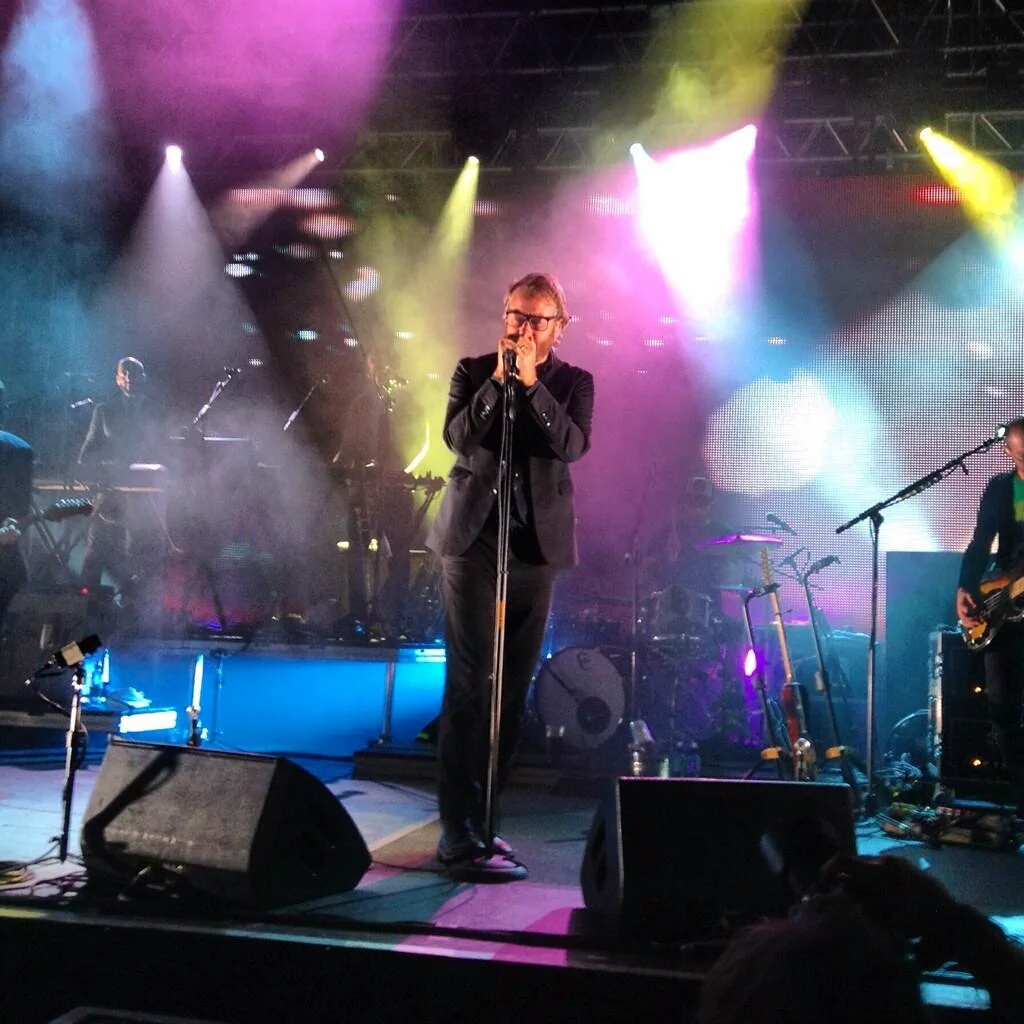
Performance by The National

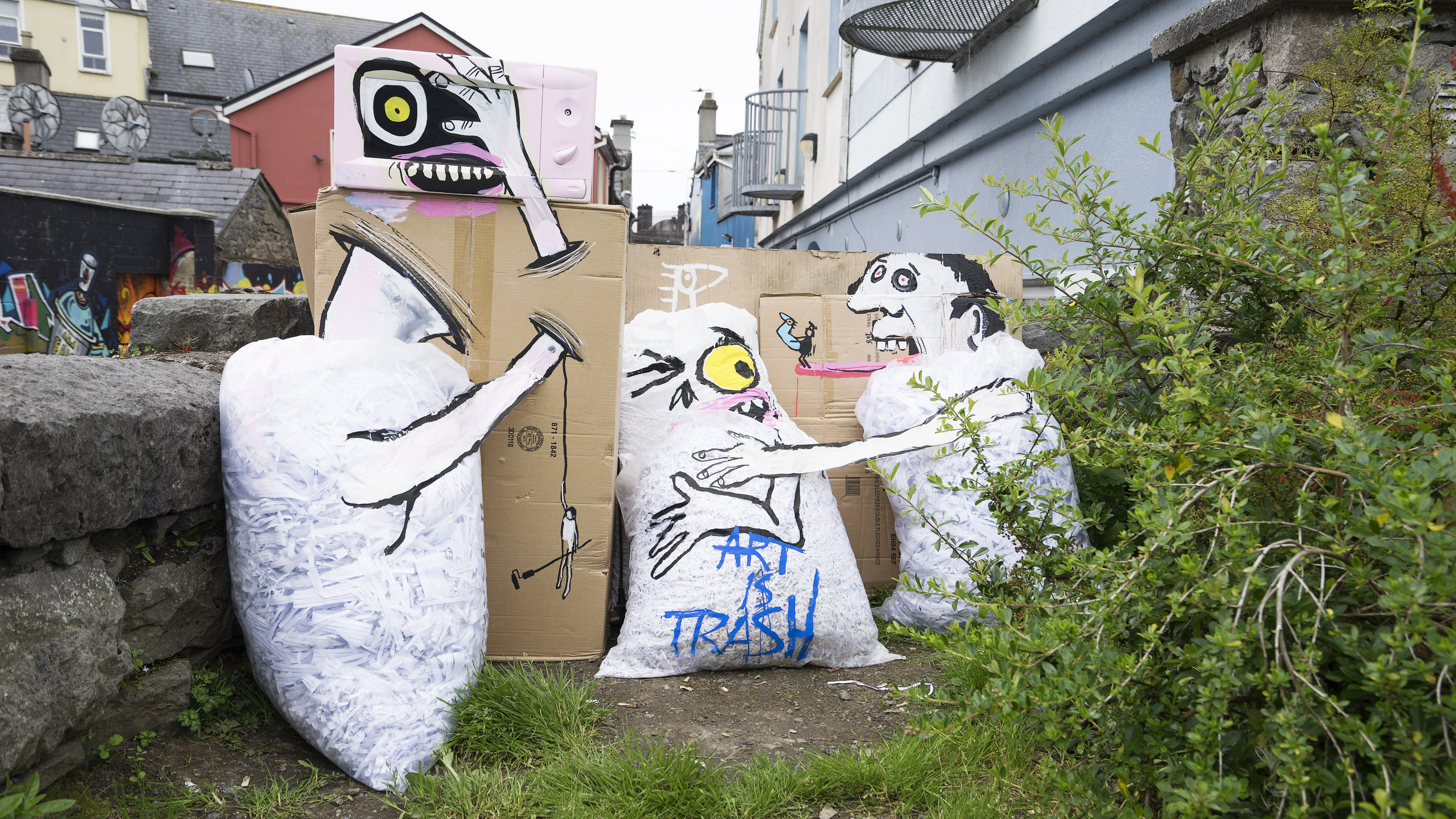
Art installation

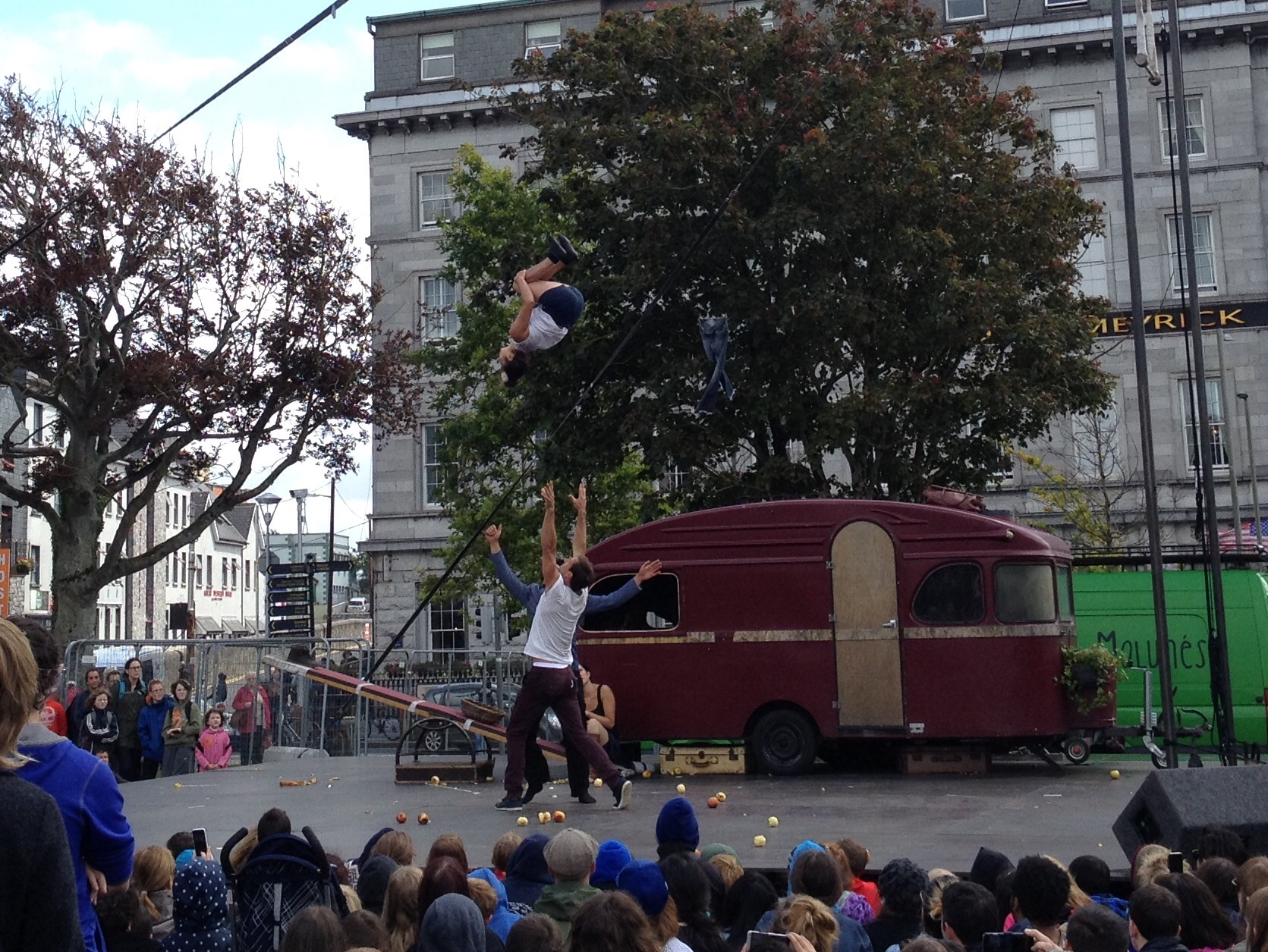
Acrobats
