= Fishamble: The New Play Company =

Dublin-based theatre company

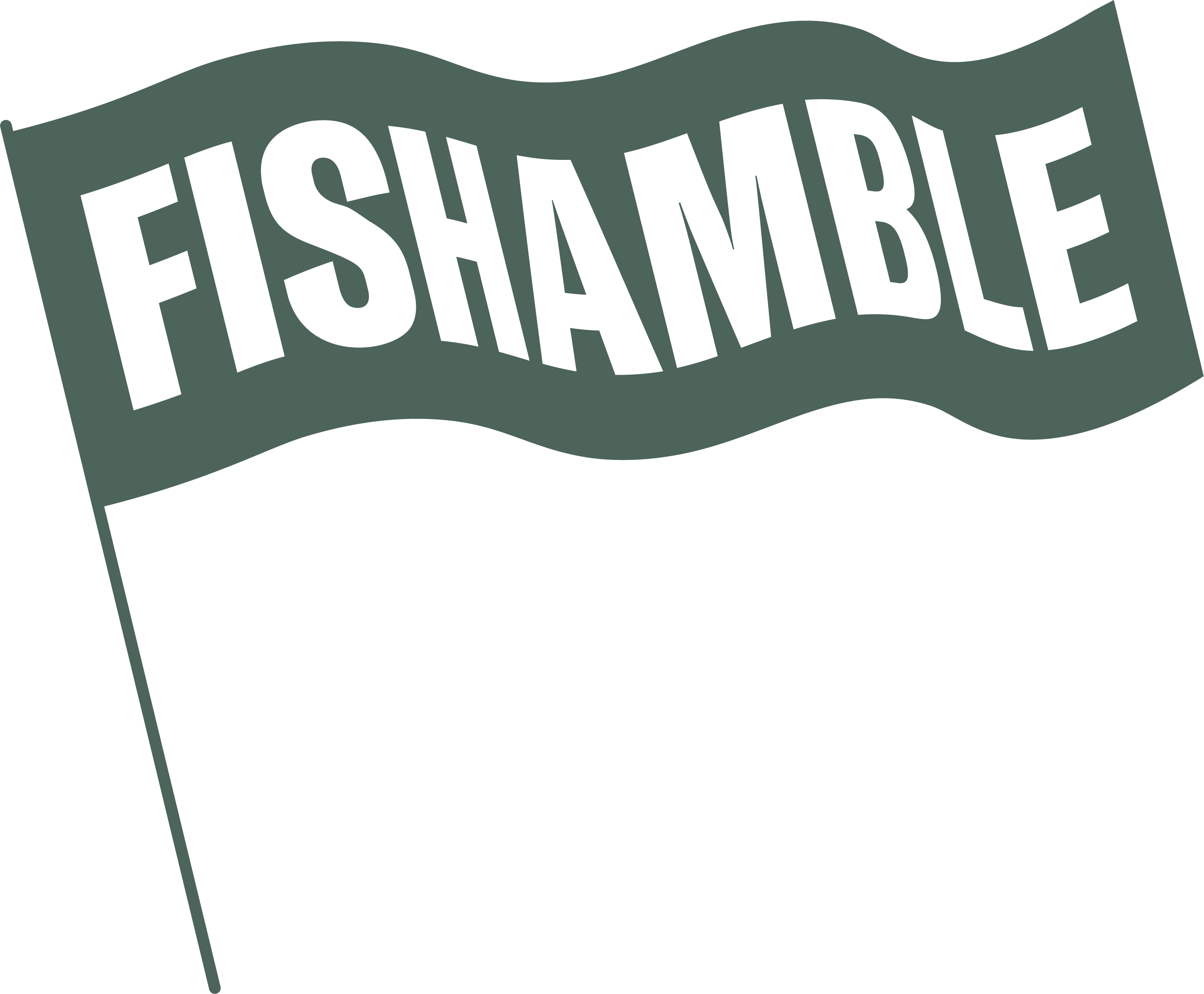
- Address: 3 Great Denmark Street; Dublin; Ireland

Website
- fishamble.com

Fishamble: The New Play Company is a Dublin-based theatre company specialising in new writing.

== History ==
Fishamble: The New Play Company originated as Pigsback, a company whose roots were in student drama. One of the founders of Pigsback and current artistic director of Fishamble, Jim Culleton, graduated in Drama Studies from Trinity College Dublin, where he met Fishamble's Literary Officer, Gavin Kostick. In 1988, Pigsback's first major outing took place as a summer season in Players Theatre where they staged Steven Berkoff's West and Tom Paulin's The Riot Act. This was followed by a January 1989 production of Peter Barnes's Red Noses at the Project Arts Centre. It was this show, said Jim Culleton, that 'established us as a company that is here to stay, a company with a professional standard of production.' Having experimented with a variety of plays, by 1990, Pigsback members had come to the realisation that it was specifically new writing that they were excited by. According to Jim Culleton,'we realised we wanted to come up with plays ourselves – plays we felt strongly about, that suited us. We wanted to encourage new writing.' A major step forward for the company took place in 1990 when they commissioned a new version of Moliere's Don Juan from Michael West. The result was a success and clarified Pigsback's vision, which, in Jim Culleton's words, was: 'to find something that is artistically challenging and contemporary. We don't want to immerse ourselves in any one style except what is theatrical or exciting and based as far as possible on new writings, adaptations or translations.'

From 1990, Pigsback consistently won annual financial support from the Arts Council (Ireland), which allowed the company to expand its activities to engage with venues and partners outside of Dublin. Between 1990 and 2009, the company produced 30 world premiers, along with dozens of short play festivals; it organised regular courses, workshops and seminars, often focused on developing new writing. In 2004, the Arts Council grant to Fishamble was €248,312, eight times the award of 1994.

During this period, the company had undertaken a major rebranding, to help underline its sense of clarity in its own mission. In 1997, the company was renamed 'Fishamble' in honour of Dublin's Fishamble Street, where in 1784, Robert Owenson established the first theatre dedicated to producing new Irish plays. This change to 'Fishamble' was also inspired by an appreciation that Ireland was becoming more multi-cultural and the world of Theatre more global. The company made a decision to present new writing to the Irish stage, without that writing having to be a new Irish play. As Jim Culleton explained: 'when we commissioned short plays a while back [1997], we ended up getting submissions from Cambodia and Vietnam and Australia and the States and Canada and all over Europe. And we thought, well, we’ve asked for submissions and people have submitted... we won't rule anyone out because they're not based in Ireland or Irish.'

One measure of success for this outlook has been recognition of the value of the company's work by the Arts Council. In 2006, it was designated a, 'Regularly Funded Organisation.' Fishamble's productions continued to grow in impact from that time and its emphasis on the production of new writing was embodied with the incorporation of 'The New Play Company' into its branding.

During 2013, to celebrate the company's 25th birthday, Fishamble donated its living archive to the National Library of Ireland.

In 2017, Fishamble produced seven plays, which led to 196 performances in 55 venues. In 2018, it plans major productions around new writing from Colin Murphy (author of Bailed Out and Guaranteed!), and Deirdre Kinahan, a supporter of #WakingTheFeminists, the campaign for equality for women in Irish theatre. For 2019, Fishamble will produce the winners of a competition for a "Play for Ireland", which it launched late in 2017.

In 2020 Fishamble decided to stream their production Inside The GPO on Easter Sunday due to the COVID-19 pandemic.

== Awards ==
The Laurence Olivier Awards are internationally recognised as the highest honour in British theatre, comparable to the BAFTA Awards for film and television and the BRIT Awards for music.

In 2016, Fishamble: The New Play Company and actor-writer Pat Kinevane received the Olivier Award for Outstanding Achievement in an Affiliate Theatre for Silent. Commenting on this and other Irish successes that year, President of Ireland Michael D. Higgins said:

"The Olivier Awards are the most prestigious theatre awards in the United Kingdom, and the awards won by Irish nominees are a great recognition and tribute to Irish theatre."

Fishamble productions have also received the following awards:

- Scotsman Fringe First Award
- Herald Angel Award
- The Argus Angel Award
- The 1st Irish Award
- The Stage Award
- Adelaide Fringe Best Theatre Award
- Dublin Fringe Award
- Forbes' Best Theater Award
- Stage Raw LA Award
- Irish Times Theatre Awards

Additionally, many of Fishamble's playwrights have won Irish Writers Guild ZeBBies and Stewart Parker Trust awards.

== New writing ==
Notable Irish writers whose plays have been developed, produced and commissioned by Fishamble include Maeve Binchy, Sebastian Barry, Joseph O'Connor, Mark O'Rowe, Dermot Bolger, Marina Carr, Colum McCann, Pat Kinevane and Gary Duggan.
