= Louise Lowe =

Irish writer and theatrical director (b. 1974)

- Born: 1974; Dublin, Ireland
- Writing career
- Language: English
- Years active: 1996–present

Louise Lowe (born 1974) is an Irish theatrical director, writer, choreographer, dramaturge and television director. She produces site-specific theatre and immersive theatre.

== Early life ==
Lowe was born in 1974 on Dublin's Foley Street. She trained at the Samuel Beckett Centre, Trinity College Dublin before completing a diploma in youth arts at NUI Maynooth.

== Career ==
Lowe worked as a drama facilitator in women's prisons and resource centres in Dublin. She wrote her first play, Diptych, in 1996 for the Dublin Fringe Festival.

In 2009 she cofounded Anu Productions with Owen Boss.

She was elected to Aosdána in 2024.

== Personal life ==
Lowe lives in Dublin.

== Works ==
=== Plays ===
- Theatre For One (Ireland)
- These Rooms
- Whereabouts
