= Enda Walsh =

Irish playwright (born 1967)

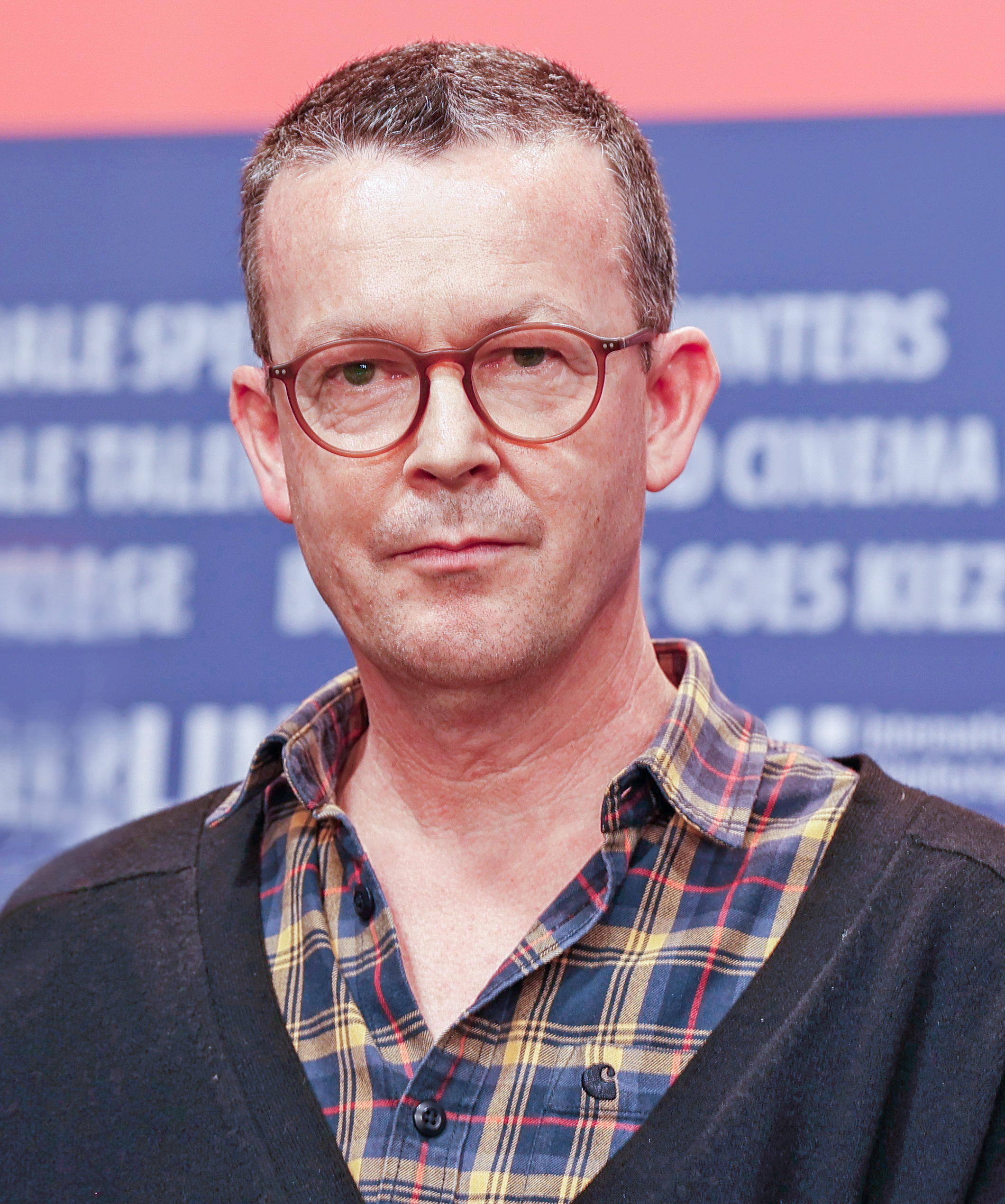
- Walsh at the 2024 Berlinale
- Born: 7 February 1967 (age 59); Dublin, Ireland
- Occupations: Playwright, screenwriter
- Spouse: Jo Ellison

Enda Walsh (born 1967) is an Irish playwright. After growing up in a large family in Dublin, Walsh worked as a film editor and theatre actor before debuting his first play, Disco Pigs in 1996.

== Biography ==
Enda Walsh was born in Kilbarrack, North Dublin on 7 February 1967. His father ran a furniture shop and his mother had been an actress. He is the second youngest of six children. Walsh has disclosed that he saw his father, a salesman, as the 'lead actor' in the business, but as Ireland's economy fluctuated, so did furniture sales. Notably during the recession in the 1980s, when profits were low, Walsh has said that he was earning more money managing his own newspaper round enterprise than his father was bringing home from the shop. Life in the large family was full of incident and Walsh has claimed that many of his plays find their origin in his relationships with his father, his mother and her friends, his three brothers and two sisters.

He attended Greendale Community School where he was taught by both Roddy Doyle and Paul Mercier. After studying Communications at Rathmines College and acting for the Dublin Youth Theatre, Walsh travelled in Europe working as a film editor. On his return to Dublin he found few opportunities and so moved to Cork where he acted for theatre-in-education company Graffiti Theatre. In 1993 Walsh began working with Pat Kiernan, director of Corcadorca, a collaborative ensemble which devised what Walsh has called 'terrible' plays. In 1996 his Disco Pigs premiered at the Triskel Art Centre in Cork. This was the start of an international career writing for the stage and screen. Feeling himself to be "too comfortable" in Dublin, in 2005 Walsh and his wife, Jo Ellison, editor of the Financial Times's How to Spend It, moved to London and settled in Kilburn with their daughter, Ada.

== Working life ==
From the outset of his career, Walsh has moved between different genres and media. Originally he would write music for one member of the Corcadorca ensemble and opportunities for dance for others. Walsh's works include musicals, an opera, art installations, and radio plays, such as Four Big Days in the Life of Dessie Banks for RTÉ and The Monotonous Life of Little Miss P for the BBC.

Walsh's plays, including Disco Pigs, Bedbound, Small Things, Chatroom, New Electric Ballroom, The Walworth Farce, Penelope and Misterman, have been translated into more than 20 languages and have had productions throughout Europe and in Australia, New Zealand and the US.

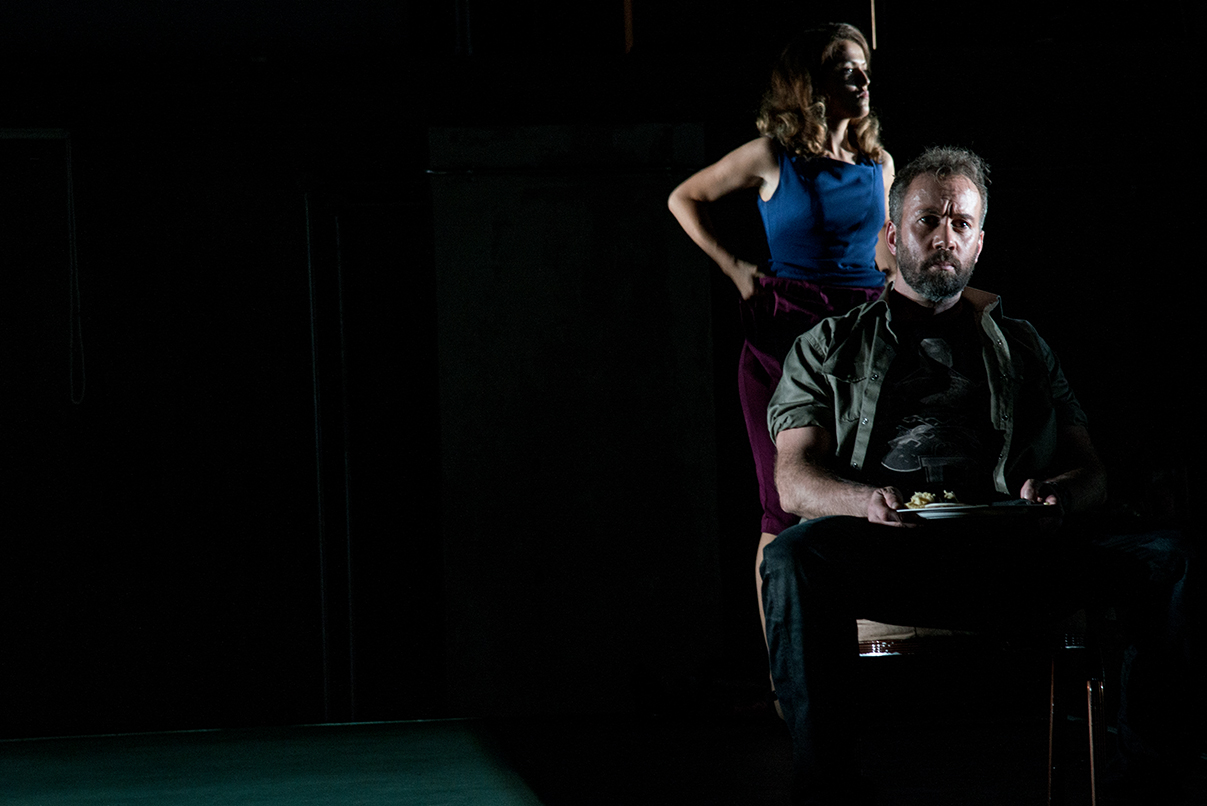
The Last Hotel by Walsh and Donnacha Dennehy, Edinburgh International Festival 2015

His play Ballyturk premiered in 2014, produced by Landmark Productions and Galway International Arts Festival starring Cillian Murphy, Stephen Rea and Mikel Murfi, and played in Dublin, Cork and London in the same year. In 2017, the production was revived at the Abbey Theatre and in early 2018 played at St. Ann's Warehouse in Brooklyn, NY. In this revival Tadhg Murphy played 1, Mikel Murfi returned as 2 and Olwen Fouere played 3. Three members of the Gleeson family (Brendan, Domhnall and Brian) played the lead roles in The Walworth Farce produced by Landmark Productions at the Olympia Theatre, Dublin, in their first theatrical production together. He adapted Roald Dahl's book The Twits for the theatre with its first production in April–May 2015. An opera entitled The Last Hotel, with music by Donnacha Dennehy, a co-production between Landmark Productions and Wide Open Opera, premiered in the Edinburgh International Festival in August 2015, played in the Dublin Theatre Festival in September 2015 and started an international tour beginning in Royal Opera House, London, in October 2015. He wrote a musical play with David Bowie entitled Lazarus, which ran for two months at the New York Theatre Workshop (Off-Broadway) beginning in late 2015. The UK production ran for three months the following October at the Kings Cross Theatre in London.

The Galway International Arts Festival hosted a project of Walsh's involving art installation rooms with audio monologues, including Room 303 featuring the voice of Niall Buggy (2014), A Girl's Bedroom featuring the voice of Charlie Murphy (2015), Kitchen featuring the voice of Eileen Walsh (2016) and Bathroom featuring the voice of Paul Reid (2017). These installations have also been shown in the Kennedy Arts Centre, Washington (May 2016) and the Irish Arts Center, New York (May 2017).

Walsh wrote the book of the musical Sing Street adapted from the film of the same name written by John Carney. Like Once, the musical was produced at New York Theatre Workshop, with performances beginning in December 2019. The musical was slated for a spring 2020 Broadway premiere before being postponed by the COVID-19 pandemic.

Walsh has also written screenplays, starting with his short film Not a Bad Christmas (1999). He adapted his play Disco Pigs, for the screen and co-wrote the screenplay of Hunger which was directed by Steve McQueen and starred Michael Fassbender as Bobby Sands, the IRA hunger striker who starved himself to death. He also adapted his play Chatroom for a film directed by Hideo Nakata. He was later commissioned to write three further films: an adaptation of the children's story Island of the Aunts by Eva Ibbotson (for Cuba Pictures), Jules in the City based on the life and music of Rufus Wainwright, and an adaptation of Gitta Sereny's book Into That Darkness, about the life of Franz Stangl, the commandant of the Sobibor and Treblinka extermination camps.

== Themes ==
Walsh has characterised his plays as being about "some sort of love and need for calm and peace". His play Penelope, he has said, is about "longing, love, lost love". He says that "all the plays are effectively about theatre, about writing" and that "all the plays are about routines". Walsh has often suggested that what interests him is "about me actually getting through the day". He sees his characters as needing "to proclaim and proclaim and proclaim ... and to what? You know, to what, construct rules and sort of mechanisms within their living room but to what end? Only to try to escape them again and probably build more and more routines and patterns and all that sort of thing". Walsh also states "what motivates me in theatre has always been to get close to characters who're on the edge of madness, or have entered it. It invigorates me to think that we're all the same…." Another statement Walsh has made is "I don't like seeing everyday life on stage: it's boring. I like my plays to exist in an abstract, expressionistic world: the audience has to learn its rules and then connect with these characters who are, on the surface dreadful monsters".

== Works ==
=== Theatre ===
- Fishy Tales (1993) – Graffiti Theatre Company, Popes Quay, Cork.
- The Ginger Ale Boy (1995) – Corcadorca Theatre Company, Granary Theatre, Cork.
- Disco Pigs (1996) – Corcadorca Theatre Company, Triskel Arts Centre, Cork. Dublin Fringe Festival, Traverse Theatre, Edinburgh Festival, West End, London. & world tour.
- Sucking Dublin (1997) – Abbey Theatre Company, Samuel Beckett Theatre, Dublin.
- Misterman (1999) – Corcadorca Theatre Company, Granary Theatre, Cork. Origin Theatre, New York, Washington and Dublin.
- Bedbound (2000) – Dublin Theatre Festival, New Theatre, Dublin. Traverse Theatre, Edinburgh Festival (Fringe First winner and Critic's Award 2001). New York. Royal Court, London.
- Pondlife Angels (2005) – Cork Midsummer Festival, Granary Theatre, Cork.
- Chatroom (2005) – Behind The Scenes Theatre Company, Buckhaven Theatre, Fife. National Theatre, London. & etc.
- The New Electric Ballroom (2005) – Munich Kammerspiele. Traverse Theatre, Edinburgh Festival. World Tour including New York, Los Angeles, Perth and London
- The Small Things (2005) – Paines Plough Company, Menier Chocolate Factory, London. Druid Theatre Company, Galway Arts Festival.
- The Walworth Farce (2006) – Druid Theatre Company, Town Hall Theatre, Galway. Edinburgh Festival. World Tour 2009–2010, including New York, Chicago, Minneapolis, Toronto, Los Angeles, Miami, Perth, Adelaide, Canberra, Sydney, Wellington, London, Salford, Oxford. A revival by Landmark Productions at the Olympia Theatre, Dublin in 2015 starred Brendan, Domhnall and Brian Gleeson in the lead roles.
- How These Men Talk (2008) – Schauspielhaus Zürich, Switzerland. Druid Theatre Company, Galway.
- Lyndie's Gotta Gun (2008) – Artistas Unidos, Lisbon. Druid Theatre Company, Galway.
- Gentrification (2008) – Stadttheater Bern, Switzerland. Druid Theatre Company, Galway.
- Delirium (2008) – An adaptation of Dostoevsky's 'The Brothers Karamazov' for Theatre O Abbey Theatre, Dublin. Barbican Theatre, London.
- The Man in the Moon (2009) – co-written with Jack Healy, The Albany, Deptford, London.
- My Friend Duplicity (2010) – short play – Traverse Theatre, Edinburgh Festival.
- Penelope (2010) – OberhausenTheater: Ruhr.2010. Druid Theatre Company, Galway. Traverse Theatre, Edinburgh Festival. World tour included Helsinki, New York and London, Steppenwolf Theater, Chicago (2011)
- Sixty Six (2011) – one of 66 writers who contributed a contemporary response to each book of the King James Bible, Bush Theatre, London.
- Once (2011) – Musical adaptation of the film Once, New York Theatre Workshop (Off-Broadway: December 2011 – January 2012) and Bernard B. Jacobs Theatre (Broadway: from March 2012).
- Misterman (revised version) (2011) – with music by Donnacha Dennehy. Landmark Productions and Galway International Arts Festival, Black Box Theatre, Galway, St. Ann's Warehouse, New York (2011). National Theatre, London (2012).
- Ballyturk (2014) – with Mikel Murfi, Cillian Murphy and Stephen Rea, featuring music by Teho Teardo. Landmark Productions in association with Galway International Arts Festival. Black Box Theatre, Galway before moving to the Olympia Theatre, Dublin, the Cork Opera House and the National Theatre, London. A revival played at the Abbey Theatre, Dublin (March 2017) and St. Ann's Warehouse, New York (January 2018).
- Room 303 (2014) – Art installation Room 303 featuring the voice of Niall Buggy, premiered at the Galway International Arts Festival.
- Lazarus (2015) – An original musical written with David Bowie, which premiered at the New York Theatre Workshop, New York.
- The Twits (2015) – An adaptation of Roald Dahl's book The Twits, premiered in April–May 2015 at the Royal Court Theatre, London.
- A Girl's Bedroom (2015) – Art installation A Girl's Bedroom featuring the voice of Charlie Murphy, premiered at the Galway International Arts Festival followed by the Kennedy Arts Center, Washington (May 2016).
- The Last Hotel (2015) – An opera with music by Donnacha Dennehy, featuring Robin Adams, Claudia Boyle, Katherine Manley and Mikel Murfi, and the Crash Ensemble. Landmark Productions and Wide Open Opera. Premiered at the Edinburgh International Festival (August 2015), followed by the Dublin Theatre Festival (September 2015), Royal Opera House, London (October 2015), and St. Ann's Warehouse, New York (January, 2016).
- Kitchen (2016) – Art installation featuring the voice of Eileen Walsh, premiered at the Galway International Arts Festival.
- Arlington (2016) - Landmark Productions in association with Galway International Arts Festival, Leisureland, Galway (July 2016), Abbey Theatre, Dublin (February 2017), St. Ann's Warehouse, New York (May 2017).
- Rooms (2016) combining the art installations 'Room 303', 'A Girl's Bedroom' and 'Kitchen', featuring the voices Niall Buggy, Charlie Murphy and Eileen Walsh, which premièred at the Galway Arts Festival last summer, followed by the Irish Arts Center, New York (May 2017).
- The Same (2017) with Eileen and Catherine Walsh. Corcadorca Theatre Company. Premiered in February 2017 at Old Cork Prison.
- The Second Violinist,(2017) – An opera with music by Donnacha Dennehy, featuring Aaron Monaghan, in the lead role, with singers Máire Flavin, Sharon Carty and Benedict Nelson, together with the Chorus of Irish National Opera, and Crash Ensemble. Landmark Productions and Irish National Opera. Premiered in July 2017 at the Galway International Arts Festival, followed by the Barbican Centre, London (September 2017) and the Dublin Theatre Festival (October 2017).
- Bathroom (2017) – Art installation featuring the voice of Paul Reid, premiered at the Galway International Arts Festival.
- Grief Is the Thing with Feathers (2018) - Enda Walsh adapted Max Porter's award-winning novel which premiered at the Black Box Theatre in Galway; In April 2019 the play was presented at the Barbican Theatre in London.
- Medicine (2021)

=== Film ===
- Not a Bad Christmas (1999) – short film
- Disco Pigs (2001) – film directed by Kirsten Sheridan
- Hunger (2008) – film directed by Steve McQueen
- Chatroom (2010) – film directed by Hideo Nakata
- Weightless (2018) – film directed by Jaron Albertin
- Island of the Aunts – an adaptation of the children's story by Eva Ibbotson under commission for Cuba Pictures
- Jules in the City – story based on the life and music of Rufus Wainwright for Daybreak Pictures/Film Four
- Into that Darkness – the story of Franz Stangl, SS commandant of the Sobibor and Treblinka extermination camps under commission for Element Pictures/Film Four
- The House (2022) – screenplay for Netflix animated dark comedy film
- Small Things Like These (2024) – film directed by Tim Mielants
- Die My Love (2025) – film directed by Lynne Ramsay
- Ish (2025) – film directed by Imran Perretta
- I See Buildings Fall Like Lightning (2026) – film directed by Clio Barnard
- Chitty Chitty Bang Bang (TBA) – film directed by Matthew Warchus (in development)

== Awards ==
Theatre

- Disco Pigs (1996): George Devine Award and Stewart Parker Awards. Best Fringe Production Award 1996, Dublin Fringe Festival. Arts Council Playwrights Award 1996. Critic's Award 1997, Edinburgh Festival.
- Bedbound (2000): Best Actor Award for Peter Gowen 2000, Irish Times Theatre Awards. Fringe First winner and Critic's Award 2001, Edinburgh Festival.
- The New Electric Ballroom (2005): Theater Heute's Best Foreign Play 2005, Munich Kammerspiele. Fringe First winner and Herald Archangel Award 2008, Edinburgh Festival. Best New Play Award 2008, Irish Times Theatre Awards. Best Supporting Actor Award for Mikel Murfi 2009, Irish Times Theatre Awards. Best New Play 2010, Obie Award.
- The Walworth Farce (2006): Fringe First winner 2007, Edinburgh Festival.
- Penelope (2010): Fringe First winner 2010, Edinburgh Festival.
- Misterman (2011): Best Actor Award for Cillian Murphy and Best Set Design for Jamie Vartan 2011, Irish Times Theatre Awards. Outstanding Solo Performance for Cillian Murphy 2012, Drama Desk Award.
- Once (2011): Winner of 3 Lucille Lortel Awards, including Outstanding Musical, with 4 additional nominations. Best Musical Award 2012, New York Drama Critics' Circle. Outstanding Broadway Musical, Outstanding Book and Director of Musical 2011, Outer Critics Circle Awards, with 4 additional nominations. Distinguished Production of a Musical 2012, Drama League Award, with 2 additional nominations. Winner of 4 Drama Desk Awards, including Outstanding Musical, with 2 additional nominations. Winner of 8 Tony Awards in 2012, including Best Musical and Best Book of a Musical, with 3 additional nominations. Best Musical Theater Album 2013, Grammy Award. Winner of 2 Laurence Olivier Awards in 2014, with 6 nominations including Best New Musical.
- Ballyturk (2014): Best Production, Irish Times Theatre Awards. Best Production and Sound Design 2014, Irish Times Theatre Awards.
- The Last Hotel (2015): Best Opera Irish Times Theatre Awards.
- The Second Violinist: The Fedora - Generali Prize for Opera 2017.

Film

- Not a Bad Christmas (1999): Short Script Award 1999, Cork Film Centre/RTÉ.
- Hunger (2008): Caméra d'Or (Best First Film), Cannes Film Festival 2008 and Best Film Sydney Film Festival and Jerusalem Film Festival 2008, Discovery Award at the Toronto International Film Festival, Heartbeat Award at the Dinard British Film Festival, Gold Hugo Award at the Chicago International Film Festival, European Film Academy Discovery Award, Best Irish Film Award from the Dublin Film Critics Circle, Best Film Award from the Evening Standard British Film Awards 2009, Best Feature Film Screenplay Award from the Writers' Guild of Great Britain, numerous Irish Film and Television IFTA Awards including Best Irish Film, nominated for Best British Film at the 62nd British Academy Film Awards.
- Chatroom (2010): Selected for the Un Certain Regard section at the 2010 Cannes Film Festival

Radio

Four Big Days in the Life of Dessie Banks: PPI Award for Best Radio Drama

In June 2013, NUI Galway awarded Walsh an honorary doctorate.
