= Chatroom (film) =

2010 film by Hideo Nakata

- Theatrical release poster
- Directed by: Hideo Nakata
- Screenplay by: Enda Walsh
- Based on: Chatroom (play) by Enda Walsh
- Produced by: Laura Hastings-Smith; Alison Owen; Paul Trijbits
- Starring: Aaron Johnson; Imogen Poots; Matthew Beard; Hannah Murray; Daniel Kaluuya
- Cinematography: Benoît Delhomme
- Edited by: Masahiro Hirakubo
- Music by: Kenji Kawai
- Production companies: Molinare; Notting Hill Films
- Distributed by: Revolver Entertainment (United Kingdom); The Weinstein Company (international)
- Release dates: 14 May 2010 (Cannes); 22 December 2010 (United Kingdom)
- Running time: 97 minutes
- Country: United Kingdom
- Language: English
- Box office: $683,912

Chatroom is a 2010 British psychological thriller drama film directed by Hideo Nakata from a screenplay by Enda Walsh, based on Walsh's 2005 play of the same name. The film follows five teenagers who meet on an online chatroom and encourage each other's bad behaviour.

== Plot ==
William Rollins is a depressed teenage boy recovering from self-harm who regularly goes online to chatrooms. One day, he opens a chatroom himself and names it "Chelsea Teens!", where he meets Jim, Eva, Emily and Mo. There is no real subject matter in "Chelsea Teens!", which instead focuses on the lives of each one as they talk. Even though they actually communicate through text only, they are depicted in an old hotel-like room and actually having contact.

William is a loner who lives with his parents. He hates both his parents, blaming them for his past, and lives his entire life on the Internet. Jim is another loner who is suffering from depression following his father leaving him and his mother. Eva, a model, is constantly bullied by her co-workers for her appearance. Emily feels distant from her parents and feels that she does not receive enough attention. Mo believes himself to be a pedophile because of his attraction to his friend Si's prepubescent sister, Keisha.

William sees it to himself to help the others in a crude manner. He Photoshops embarrassing pictures of Eva's co-worker and posts them online. He convinces Jim to flush down his antidepressants to make himself feel more relaxed and to reveal his face behind the depressants, his true identity. He tells Emily to do some dirty work, teaming up with Eva. They devise ways in which Emily could be more violent and make it look like somebody is harassing her family, which makes her parents try to protect her more. He tells Mo to tell Si the truth, but this backfires when Si calls him a pervert and attacks him.

William becomes darker and more menacing and even begins to watch people commit suicide. He then takes it upon himself to coerce Jim into committing suicide. His plans are halted though when his computer and phone are taken away from him by his father, who when looking through William's computer, finds one of the suicide videos. William gets his backup computer and phone and goes after Jim, who meets up with him at London Zoo. Mo and the others discover about William's intended actions and go to stop him, meeting up in person and trying to follow William and Jim around London.

Jim makes it to the zoo first but decides to not do it. He tries to leave, but William chases him. William catches Jim, who refuses to shoot himself and throws the gun to the floor. When William gets it and comes back, Eva punches him and the rest of the crew comes, followed by the police. William tries to escape but only manages to climb up some crates. He then falls in front of the speeding train behind the crates and is killed. The teens leave without talking to each other; William's account is shut down. William walks in a chat tunnel as the light gradually fades.

== Cast ==
- Aaron Johnson as William Rollins
- Imogen Poots as Eva
- Matthew Beard as Jim
- Hannah Murray as Emily
- Daniel Kaluuya as Mo
- Megan Dodds as Grace Rollins
- Michelle Fairley as Rosie
- Nicholas Gleaves as Paul Rollins
- Jacob Anderson as Si
- Tuppence Middleton as Candy
- Ophelia Lovibond as Charlotte
- Richard Madden as Ripley Rollins
- Elarica Johnson as Ushi

== Production ==
Principal photography took place in early 2010 at Shepperton Studios in Shepperton, Surrey, with some outdoor scenes shot in Camden and Primrose Hill. The film is based on a screenplay by Enda Walsh, who wrote the stage play of the same name.

== Release ==
The film premiered in the Un Certain Regard section of the 2010 Cannes Film Festival. The theatrical release was in late 2010. It premiered in France in late summer 2010. In September 2010, the film acquired a British distributor. Revolver Entertainment also planned a special online marketing campaign for the film.

=== Critical reception ===
Chatroom received largely negative reviews. On the review aggregator website Rotten Tomatoes, the film holds an approval rating of 9% based on reviews from 23 critics, with an average rating of 3.5/10.
