= The Walworth Farce =

2006 play written by Enda Walsh

- Original language: English
- Written by: Enda Walsh
- Characters: Dinny; Blake; Sean; Hayley
- Genre: Black comedy, tragicomedy
- Setting: A flat in Elephant and Castle, London

Premiere
- Date: 20 March 2006
- Place: Town Hall Theatre, Galway, Ireland

The Walworth Farce is a 2006 play by Enda Walsh.

== Plot ==
A council flat on the Walworth Road, Elephant and Castle, London. Dinny is exiled from his native Cork City with his two sons Blake and Sean. Every day, holed up in the flat, they endlessly perform a play which depicts, in extremely garbled form, their last day in Ireland, which featured the death of Dinny's mother, followed by Dinny murdering his brother and sister-in-law. Blake plays all the female roles in a variety of wigs, while Sean plays the male roles. They also perform as younger versions of themselves, in which they bully other children and kill a dog. As they repeat the play (to an audience of nobody), it becomes apparent that this is a script that is constantly revised and modified, and features many bizarre events (such as Dinny's mother and neighbour dying in an accident involving a horse and a speedboat). Sean has some memory of the real events, and tells Blake (who has no memory of them) that the boys were in reality quiet children who planned to become astronauts and bus drivers when they grew up, and that their depiction as young sadists is their father's invention.

Only Sean is permitted to leave the flat, walking down fifteen flights of stairs to go to the local Tesco supermarket for "supplies". One day he accidentally brings back the wrong shopping, and the cashier, Hayley, who has developed a connection to Sean, goes to the flat to give him his groceries. The first act ends with her entrance into the flat, as the present day and reality intrude on Dinny's recreation of an imagined past.

The family struggle to integrate Hayley into the performance as she struggles to escape, and to bring Sean with her.

== Performance history ==
The Walworth Farce premiered at the Town Hall Theatre, Galway on 20 March 2006, commissioned by the Druid Theatre Company. This first production starred Denis Conway as Dinny, Garrett Lombard as Blake, Aaron Monaghan as Sean and Syan Blake as Hayley. A 2008 run at New York’s St. Ann’s Warehouse saw Tadhg Murphy and Mercy Ojelade as Sean and Hayley, respectively, while a 2015 revival, produced by Landmark Productions at the Olympia Theatre, Dublin starred real-life father and sons Brendan Gleeson, Domhnall Gleeson and Brian Gleeson as Dinny, Blake and Sean respectively; Leona Allen played Hayley.

In January 2023, the play was announced as the opening show for the new home of the Southwark Playhouse at Highpoint in Elephant and Castle.
