= Kirsten Sheridan =

Irish film director and screenwriter

- Born: 14 July 1976 (age 50); Dublin, Ireland
- Occupations: Director, screenwriter, editor
- Years active: 1995–present
- Children: 3

Kirsten Sheridan (born 14 July 1976) is an Irish film director and screenwriter. She is best known for co-writing the semi-autobiographical film In America with her father, director Jim Sheridan, and her sister, Naomi Sheridan, for which she was nominated for an Academy Award for Best Original Screenplay and a Golden Globe Award for Best Screenplay.

She is also known as the director of films Disco Pigs and August Rush.

== Early life ==
Born in Dublin, Sheridan moved to New York City in 1981, spending her early childhood there while her father struggled to make it as an actor and theater director. Her family moved back to Ireland eight years later, whereupon her father found success as the director of My Left Foot, in which Sheridan plays the younger sister of lead actor Daniel Day-Lewis. She studied script writing at New York University in 1993 and went to film school at University College Dublin, ultimately earning her film degree from Dun Laoghaire College of Art and Design in 1998.

== Career ==
Her thesis short film Patterns won several international film festival awards, including Clermont-Ferrand, Cork, Galway, Dresden, Aspen, and Chicago, and her next short, The Case of Majella McGinty, about a little girl who escapes her stressful life by crawling into a suitcase, received festival awards at Foyle, Cork, San Francisco, Cologne, and Worldfest Houston.

The first feature film Sheridan directed was 2001's Disco Pigs, Enda Walsh's screen adaptation of his own play, starring Cillian Murphy and Elaine Cassidy as teenagers in a lifelong, obsessive, antisocial friendship. The Guardian described the independent film as a "stylised, hyperkinetic drama ... that combines kitchen-sink realism and vicious fight scenes with highly stylised fantasy sequences". Disco Pigs earned Sheridan nominations for best director at the British Independent Film Awards and the Irish Film & TV Academy Awards, as well as prizes at the Castellinaria Youth Film Festival, the Giffoni Film Festival, the Young European Cinema Film Festival and the Ourense Film Festival.

Next, Sheridan collaborated with her father Jim and sister Naomi on the script for In America, a film based on their memories of their family's years of poverty in New York, with the story of the death of Jim's younger brother woven in as an added element. Jim directed the film, which went on to success and earned several prestigious awards nominations, including an Oscar nomination for Best Original Screenplay. Sheridan's latest film is 2007's August Rush, which stars Jonathan Rhys Meyers and Keri Russell as star-crossed lovers and musicians, Freddie Highmore as their orphaned musical prodigy offspring, and Robin Williams as a Faginesque character. The Irish Times criticized the film as "bounc(ing) around between so many forms, moods and genres that it proves impossible to get a handle on," while Variety called it "utterly predictable, but with moments of genuine charm."

Sheridan directed Dollhouse in 2010. Filming took place over 21 days, and it was released in 2012. The unscripted story, featured a cast of young Irish actors, including then-unknown Jack Reynor and Seána Kerslake. The film was featured at the 62nd Berlin International Film Festival and won the jury prize at the 2012 Odesa International Film Festival.

Sheridan has won many awards for her short films.

Sheridan was a co-executive producer and a writer on the FX series Say Nothing, which premiered on Hulu on 14 November 2024.

She was also an executive producer on the Sky/Peacock series Lockerbie: A Search for Truth, starring Colin Firth, which premiered on 2 January 2025.

== Personal life ==
Sheridan has three children, sons Leo (born 2002), Séamus (born 2007) and Frankie (born 2010).

== Filmography ==
Short film

| Year | Title | Director | Writer | Producer | Editor |
|---|---|---|---|---|---|
| 1995 | The Bench | Yes | Yes | No | Yes |
| 1996 | Gentleman Caller | Yes | No | No | Yes |
| 1997 | Walking into Mirrors | Yes | No | Yes | Yes |
| 1998 | Patterns | Yes | Yes | Yes | Yes |
| 1999 | The Case of Majella McGinty | Yes | No | No | No |

Feature film

| Year | Title | Director | Writer |
|---|---|---|---|
| 2001 | Disco Pigs | Yes | No |
| 2002 | In America | No | Yes |
| 2007 | August Rush | Yes | No |
| 2012 | Dollhouse | Yes | Yes |

Editor

- Between Two Worlds (1997)
- Ward Zone (1998)

Ref.:

== Selected awards and nominations ==
| Year | Award | Category | Work | Result | Notes |
|---|---|---|---|---|---|
| 2004 | Academy Award | Best Original Screenplay | In America | Nominated | shared with Jim Sheridan, Naomi Sheridan |
| 2004 | Golden Globe Award | Best Screenplay | In America | Nominated | shared with Jim Sheridan, Naomi Sheridan |
| 2004 | Broadcast Film Critics Association Awards | Best Writer | In America | Won | shared with Jim Sheridan, Naomi Sheridan |
| 2003 | Irish Film and Television Awards | Best Director of a Feature Film | Disco Pigs | Nominated | |
| 2002 | British Independent Film Awards | Douglas Hickox Award | Disco Pigs | Nominated | |
| 2000 | Irish Film and Television Awards | Best Short Film | The Case of Majella McGinty | Nominated | shared with producers Siobhan Bourke and Kate Lennon |
| 1998 | Film Institute of Ireland | Young Irish Talent Award | | Won | |
