= Selina Cartmell =

British theatre director

- Born: Cumbria, UK
- Education: Trinity College Dublin, University of Glasgow, Royal Central School of Speech and Drama
- Occupation: Director at Gate Theatre

Selina Cartmell is a British theatre director based in Dublin, Ireland. She is currently Artistic Director/Co-CEO at the Royal Exchange Theatre.

== Early life and education ==
Cartmell was born in the Lake District, UK. Her mother Annie worked as a midwife and her father Gordon is a retired accountant, and she has three older brothers. She holds a MA (Distinction) from the Royal Central School of Speech and Drama in Advanced Theatre Practice in Directing and an MA in History of Art and Drama from University of Glasgow and Trinity College Dublin, where she wrote her thesis on Samuel Beckett.

== Career ==
Cartmell moved to Dublin and set up her own company Siren Productions in 2004. She has worked as a freelance director throughout Irish theatre, including at the Abbey Theatre and the Gate Theatre. She was the 2010-1 Artist-in-Residence at the Samuel Beckett Theatre. In 2017, she was announced as the fourth artistic director of the Gate Theatre, where she has since directed three plays: Red Shoes (2018), Assassins (2018) and A Christmas Carol (2019). She directed her first film called The Date in 2017 with funding from RTÉ and Filmbase, which won Best First Short Drama at the Galway Film Fleadh in July 2017.

In April 2024 it was announced that she had been appointed as Creative Director for the Royal Exchange Theatre in Manchester.

== Awards ==
Winner of the Irish Times Theatre Award for Best Director:

- Punk Rock (2014)
- Medea (2010)
- Titus Andronicus (2005)

2018 Irish Tatler Arts and Literature Award
