= Jo Ellison =

British journalist

- Born: Cambridge, UK
- Education: University of Edinburgh
- Occupation: Journalist
- Employers: Irish Examiner; The Independent; British Vogue; Financial Times
- Known for: How to Spend It
- Spouse: Enda Walsh
- Children: 1
- Website: www.ft.com/jo-ellison

Jo Ellison is editor of How to Spend It (HTSI), a weekly magazine of the Financial Times.

== Education and early life ==
Born in Cambridge and raised in London and Dubai, Ellison studied history at the University of Edinburgh.

== Career ==
Ellison's career began at the Irish Examiner, after which she became features editor of The Independent, writing arts reviews and editing. In 2008 she joined British Vogue, where she became features editor, and then features director, before taking over as fashion editor at the Financial Times from Vanessa Friedman, who moved to The New York Times in 2014 and had held the position since regular fashion coverage had been introduced in 2002. In 2019, Ellison succeeded longtime How to Spend It editor Gillian de Bono.

== Personal life ==
Ellison met her husband, playwright Enda Walsh while working in a theatre in Edinburgh. She moved to Cork to live with him a year later. They live in Kilburn, London and have a daughter.
