= Anu Productions =

Irish multidisciplinary theatre company

ANU Productions
- Formation: April 2009
- Type: Immersive theatre; Site-specific theatre
- Location: Dublin, Ireland
- Artistic director(s): Louise Lowe; Owen Boss
- Website: anuproductions.ie

ANU Productions is an Irish multidisciplinary theatre company founded in 2009 in Dublin. It creates immersive and site-specific performances that combine theatre, visual art, and installation art. The company is led by director Louise Lowe and visual artist Owen Boss.

== History and approach ==
Founded in Dublin in 2009 by Louise Lowe, Owen Boss, Hannah Mullan, Sophie Motley, and Sarah Jane Shiels, ANU Productions creates work across theatre, film, dance, and visual art that explores Irish social history and urban life. Rather than using traditional stages, the company places performances directly within real-world locations, drawing on historical research and personal testimony to shape each piece. Visual design by co-artistic director Owen Boss emphasizes physical closeness, spatial awareness, and active audience participation.

A recurring device in the company's work, termed "NOW-THEN-NOW" by co-director Louise Lowe, layers the performed past directly onto the present moment, so that spectators experience historical events alongside their contemporary setting rather than as a re-enactment set apart from it.

== Major works ==
ANU has produced more than fifty works across theatre, installation, and public art. Its output includes multi‑year cycles, site‑specific performances, gallery installations, and large‑scale public commissions.

=== The Monto Cycle (2010–2014) ===
The four‑part Monto Cycle examined the history of Dublin’s north inner city:

- World’s End Lane (2010) – winner of Best Off‑Site Production at the Dublin Fringe Festival.
- Laundry (2011) – staged in a former Magdalene Laundry; winner of Best Production at the Irish Times Theatre Awards.
- The Boys of Foley Street (2012) – winner of Best Off‑Site Production at the Dublin Fringe Festival.
- Vardo (2014) – final production in the cycle.

=== Centenary and commemorative works (2014–2019) ===
ANU created several major works commemorating historical events, earning Irish Times Theatre Awards Judges’ Special Awards for its Lockout (2014) and Easter Rising (2017) centenary cycles:

- Angel Meadow (2014) – produced with HOME Manchester; winner of Best Production and Best Ensemble at the Manchester Theatre Awards.
- These Rooms (2016) – co‑production with CoisCéim Dance Theatre; winner of the Audience Choice Award at the Irish Times Theatre Awards.
- Sunder (2016) – part of ANU's Easter Rising centenary cycle, staged around Dublin's Moore Street and the ILAC Shopping Centre.
- Faultline (2018) – co‑production with the Gate Theatre and the Irish Queer Archive.
- The Anvil (2019) – city‑wide commissions for the Manchester International Festival.

=== Later productions and installations (2020–present) ===
- Torch (2020) – site‑specific performance exploring women’s histories in Dublin.
- Beyond These Rooms (2020) – installation at Tate Liverpool.
- Untitled (Hentown Project) (2021) – immersive work examining Dublin’s Docklands redevelopment.
- The Dead (2025) – recipient of the Business to Arts Small Arts Partnership Award.
- The Good Luck Club (2026) – commissioned by the National Archives of Ireland for the release of the 1926 Census of Ireland.

== Partnerships and international work ==
ANU has collaborated with cultural organisations in Ireland and abroad, including the Dublin Theatre Festival, Gate Theatre, National Archives of Ireland, Dublin Port, the Irish Museum of Modern Art (IMMA), and The Ark. The company has also toured to the United Kingdom, co-producing and presenting work with institutions such as HOME Manchester, the Manchester International Festival, Tate Liverpool, and the London International Festival of Theatre.

== Bibliography ==
- "2025 Business to Arts Award Winners Announced". Business to Arts. 2025.
- "ANU Productions Is Creating Immersive Shows From Our History". District Magazine. 2026.
- "ANU Productions". Field Arts. 2024.
- "Irish Times Theatre Awards – Full List Of Winners". Hot Press. 6 March 2017.
- "Owen Boss: 'This is a magical Macnas parade with climate change at its core.'". IMAGE.ie. 2025.
- "Irish Times Theatre Awards 2011". Irish Theatre Institute. 2011.
- Kelly, Marie; O'Gorman, Siobhán; Phillips, Áine (2020). "Performing Ireland: Now, Then, Now". Scene. 8: 7–27. doi:10.1386/scene_00020_1.
- McIvor, Charlotte; Walsh, Ian R. (2024). Contemporary Irish Theatre. Springer.
- "ANU Productions – Theatre Artists in Residence". Mermaid Arts Centre. 2021.
- "Irish Times Theatre Awards". The Irish Times. 24 February 2014.
- "Twenty-five years of the Irish Times Irish Theatre Awards: who won, when and for what". The Irish Times. 24 March 2023.
- "Welcome HOME: A Look at HOME's Site-Specific Theatre Programme". The Skinny. 2014.
- "The Boys of Foley Street". Dublin City Arts Office.
- Singleton, Brian (2021). "ANU Productions and the performance of otherness". Orbis Litterarum. 76 (6): 301–310. doi:10.1111/oli.12325.
- Singleton, Brian (2016). ANU Productions: The Monto Cycle. London: Palgrave Pivot. doi:10.1057/978-1-349-95133-8. ISBN 978-1-349-95132-1.
