= Donnacha Dennehy =

Irish composer (born 1970)

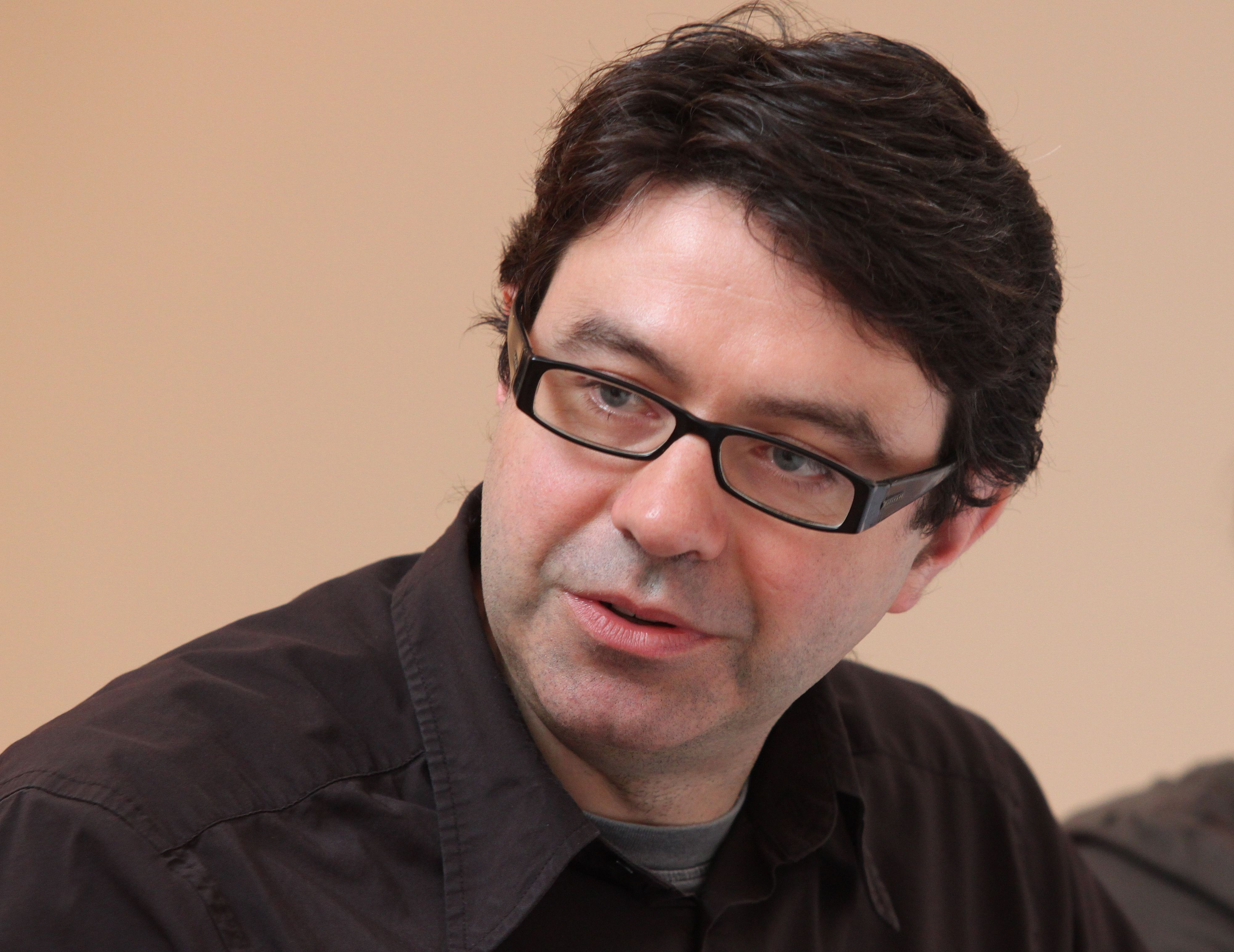
- Donnacha Dennehy, 2010
- Born: 17 August 1970 (age 55); Dublin, Ireland
- Occupation: Composer
- Website: www.donnachadennehy.com

Donnacha Dennehy (born 17 August 1970) is an Irish composer and leader of the Crash Ensemble specializing in contemporary classical music. According to musicologist Bob Gilmore, Dennehy's "high profile of his compositions internationally, together with his work as artistic director of Dublin’s Crash Ensemble, has distinguished him as one of the best-known voices of his generation of Irish composers".

== Career and works ==
Dennehy was born in Dublin, where he read music at Trinity College where he studied composition with Hormoz Farhat. He continued his studies in music at the University of Illinois at Urbana-Champaign (UIUC), with support from a Fulbright Scholarship, and earned his master's and doctoral degrees at UIUC. His post-doctoral musical period included a stint at IRCAM, with Gérard Grisey, and studies in the Netherlands with Louis Andriessen.

In 1997, Dennehy returned to Dublin and subsequently co-founded the Crash Ensemble, which focuses on the performance and recording of contemporary music. His works for the Crash Ensemble include Junk Box Fraud, Derailed, and For Herbert Brun. He later returned to Trinity College Dublin as a lecturer in music. His 2005 work for chorus and orchestra, Hive, displays his developing interest in microtones and harmonies based on harmonic spectra. His composition Grá Agus Bás, which was premiered in February 2007, incorporated music from the sean nós tradition and was a collaboration with the Irish vocalist Iarla Ó Lionáird. He is a member of Aosdána, Ireland's state-sponsored academy of artists.

NMC Records in London released the first portrait CD devoted to his music, Elastic Harmonic (NMC D133), in June 2007. In the spring of 2011, Nonesuch released an album with Grá Agus Bás and the Yeats cycle That the Night Come. His first opera, The Last Hotel, an 80-minute chamber work with a libretto by Enda Walsh about a woman planning her suicide, received its premiere on 8 August 2015 in Edinburgh, followed by performances in Dublin, London, New York and Luxembourg. A recording (taken live from the Luxembourg performances) was issued in 2019. The Hunger, about the Great Irish Famine, premiered in June 2016 at a concert performance in Washington DC, and in a staged production in St. Louis and at the Brooklyn Academy of Music, all with the orchestra Alarm Will Sound.

Dennehy was a visiting scholar at Princeton University from 2012 onwards. He served as composer-in-residence for the Fort Worth Symphony Orchestra in 2013/14. In the fall of 2014, he joined the faculty of the music department at Princeton University.

He wrote Hard Landing about the "Miracle on the Hudson". It was commissioned by the BBC, first performed by the BBC National Orchestra of Wales on 6 February 2025, and had its radio premiere on BBC Radio 3 on 29 March 2025.

== Compositions ==
=== Orchestra / chamber orchestra ===
- Junk Box Fraud (1997)
- The Vandal (2000)
- O (2002)
- Elastic Harmonic (2005); violin and orchestra
- Hive (2005); voices and orchestra
- Aisling Gheal (2007); voice and chamber orchestra
- Grá agus Bás (2007); voice and chamber orchestra
- Crane (2009)
- That the Night Come (2010); soprano and chamber orchestra
- If he died, what then (2012); soprano and chamber orchestra
- Disposable Dissonance (2012)
- The Hunger [(parts I–IV) 2013]; soprano and chamber orchestra
- Three Sean Nós Settings (2013); voice and orchestra
- Dirty Light (2013)
- Turn (2014)
- Memoria (2021); symphony orchestra
- Hard Landing (2024)

=== Small ensemble with voice ===
- Two Yeats Songs (1993); soprano and flute
- Hinterlands (2002); two female voices and backing track
- To Herbert Brun (2002); voice, saxophone, trombone, double bass, and live electronics
- The Weathering (2004); soprano, recorder, percussion, violin, and video
- Swift's Epitaph (2008); countertenor and percussion

=== Instrumental ensemble ===
- Pluck, Stroke, and Hammer (1997); piano quintet
- The Traces of a Revolutionary Song (1998)
- A Game for Gentlemen Played by Thugs (1999)
- Severance (1999)
- Ecstasis, full stop (1999); string quartet and backing track
- Counting (2000); string quartet and backing track
- Derailed (2000)
- Composition for percussion, loops, blips and flesh (2002); percussion sextet
- Glamour Sleeper (2002)
- Streetwalker (2003)
- The Pale (2003); saxophone quartet and percussion sextet
- The Blotting (2004)
- Table Manners (2004); percussion quartet
- Mild, Medium-Lasting, Artificial Happiness (2004); saxophone quartet or any quartet of like-sounding instruments
- Tilt (2006); electric guitar quartet
- Bulb (2006); piano trio
- Pushpulling (2007); string quartet
- Fold (2008)
- STAMP (2008); string quartet
- As An Nós (2009)
- An Irish Process (2009)
- Céad Slán (One Hundred Goodbyes) (2011); string quartet and backing track

=== Solo/electroacoustic ===
- Work for Organ (1992)
- GUBU (1995); tape
- Begobs I–IV (1995); piano
- Metropolis Mutabilis (1995); tape and optional video (by Hugh Reynolds)
- Voitures (1996); oboe and tape
- Curves (1997); amplified harp and tape
- Swerve (1998); flute and tape
- FAT (2000); flute and tape
- Mad, Avid, Sad (2000); organ
- pAt (2001); piano and tape
- [H]interlands (2002); two female voices and tape
- PADDY (2003); percussion
- BRAT (2000/5); recorder and tape (arrangement of FAT)
- North Strand (2007); piano
- North Circular (2007); piano
- Reservoir (2007); piano
- Stainless Staining (2007); piano and backing track
- Overstrung (2010); violin and backing track
- Misterman (2011); music for a play by Enda Walsh

=== Open ensemble ===
- Blips and Static (2002); multiple boomboxes
- Flashbulb (2006); three melody instruments and one struck instrument
- A Fatal Optimist (2008); for any instrumentation

=== Opera ===
- The Last Hotel (2015)
- The Hunger (2016)
- The Second Violinist (2017)
- The First Child (2021)

== Discography ==
- Elastic Harmonic. NMC, 2007 (includes Glamour Sleeper; Paddy; Junk Box Fraud; Elastic Harmonic, pAt, Streetwalker)
- Grá agus Bás. Nonesuch, 2011
- Stainless Staining. Cantaloupe, 2012 (Lisa Moore, piano Stainless Staining; Reservoir)
