= The Irish Times Irish Theatre Awards =

Annual theatre awards in Ireland

The Irish Times Irish Theatre Awards recognise outstanding achievements in Irish theatre.

== History ==
The Irish Times Irish Theatre Awards were established in 1997 by The Irish Times to recognise excellence in professional theatre across the island of Ireland. The awards were conceived to reflect the full breadth of theatrical practice, encompassing productions in both the Republic of Ireland and Northern Ireland, and covering a wide range of disciplines including acting, directing, design, and new writing.

From their inception, the awards have aimed to support and promote innovative and adventurous theatre, with particular emphasis on new Irish work and emerging talent. Productions staged in major venues such as Abbey Theatre and Gate Theatre, as well as those in smaller independent theatres and festivals, are considered eligible.

The judging panel is composed annually of theatre critics and cultural commentators, who attend productions throughout the year before compiling a shortlist of nominees.

== Description ==
The awards recognise achievement across multiple categories, typically including Best Production, Best Director, Best Actor and Actress in leading and supporting roles, as well as awards for set, costume, lighting, and sound design. In addition to these categories, the judges may offer a Special Award to honour outstanding contribution or leadership within the theatre community.

Nominations are traditionally announced each January, with the ceremony taking place the following month at a high-profile, invitation-only event in Dublin. However, this schedule has occasionally been adjusted; for example, due to the disruption caused by the COVID-19 pandemic, the 2021 nominations were announced in May 2022, with the ceremony held in June 2022. The awards are widely regarded as one of the most prestigious honours in Irish theatre, frequently highlighting both established practitioners and emerging artists.

== By year ==
=== 2010 awards ===
(Winners in bold):

Best Actor

- Malcolm Adams, as Tim Hartigan in Slattery's Sago Saga
- Louis Lovett, as B and Brian in B For Baby at the Abbey Theatre
- **Marty Rea**, as Hamlet in Hamlet
- Karl Shiels, as Quinn in Penelope

Best Actress

- Aoife Duffin, as Winnie Butler in Christ Deliver Us!
- **Olwen Fouéré**, as the woman in Sodome, My Love
- Hilary O'Shaughnessy, as the tour guide in Berlin Love Tour
- Eileen Walsh, as Medea in Medea

Best Supporting Actor

- Joe Hanley, as Fluther Good in The Plough and the Stars
- **Laurence Kinlan**, as Mossy Lannigan in Christ Deliver Us!
- Ronan Leahy, as Tutor/Messenger in Medea
- Conor MacNeill, as Lyokha in Plasticine

Best Supporting Actress

- Karen Ardiff, as Mrs Cregan and Sheelagh Mann in The Colleen Bawn
- Brid Brennan, as Madge in Philadelphia, Here I Come!
- Andrea Irvine, as Lady Macduff in Macbeth
- **Eleanor Methven**, as Miss Prism in The Importance of Being Earnest

Best Director

- **Selina Cartmell**, for Medea, produced by Siren Productions
- Wayne Jordan, for Christ Deliver Us!, produced by the Abbey Theatre
- Jo Mangan, for Slattery's Sago Saga, produced by Performance Corporation
- Rachel O'Riordan, for Over the Bridge, produced by Green Shoot Productions

Best Set

- John Comiskey, for Sodome My Love
- **Aedin Cosgrvoe**, for The Rehearsal, Playing the Dane
- Tom Pye, for John Gabriel Borkman

Best Costumes

- **Joan Bergin**, for John Gabriel Borkman
- Miriam Duffy, for The Birthday of the Infanta
- Bláithin Sheerin, for Phaedra

Best Lighting

- Paul Keogan, for Plasticine
- Sinéad McKenna, for Medea
- **Sinéad Wallace**, for Happy Days

Best Sound

- **Dennis Clohessy**, for Sodome My Love
- Ellen Cranitch, for Phaedra
- Philip Stewart, for The Early Bird

Best Production

- Anu Productions, for World's End Lane
- **Pan Pan Theatre**, for The Rehearsal, Playing the Dane
- Rough Magic, for Phaedra
- Siren Productions, for Medea

Best New Play

- **B for Baby**, by Carmel Winters
- National Anthem, by Colin Bateman
- Slaterry's Sago Saga, by Arthur Riordan
- What's Left of the Flag, by Jimmy Murphy

Best Opera Production

- Dumbworld/Brian Irvine Ensemble, for Postcards from Dumbworld, by Brian Irvine
- Opera Ireland, for Roméo et Juliette, by Charles Gounod
- Opera Theatre Company, for The Diary of Anne Frank, by Grigory Frid
- **Wexford Festival Opera**, for Virginia, by Saverio Mercadante

Judges Special Award

- Carysfort Press
- Louise Lowe/Anu Productions
- **Project Brand New**
- Theatre Upstairs

=== 2011 awards ===
(Winners in bold):

Best Actor

- Patrick O'Kane as John Proctor in The Crucible
- **Cillian Murphy** as Thomas Magill in Misterman
- Paul Reid as Farrell Blinks in Man of Valour
- Philip Judge as Older Man in Trade

Best Actress

- **Charlie Murphy** as Eliza in Pygmalion
- Amy Conroy as Gina Devine in Eternal rising of The Sun
- Marie Mullen as Woman in Testament
- Aisling O'Sullivan as Maggie Polpin in Big Maggie

Best Supporting Actor

- **John Olohan** as Byrne in Big Maggie
- Rory Nolan as Commissioner in The Government Inspector
- Frankie McCafferty as Ivan in The Seafarer
- Bob Kelly as Martin O Bonnassa / Osborne O'Loonassa / Gentleman / Others in The Poor Mouth

Best Supporting Actress

- Dearbhla Molloy & Ingrid Craigie as Eileen and Kate in The Cripple of Inishmaan
- **Aoife Duffin** as Abigail Williams in The Crucible
- Karen Ardiff as Aase / Green-Clad in Peer Gynt
- Caitriona Ní Mhurchú as Masha in 16 Possible Glimpses

Best Director

- **Conall Morrison** for The Crucible
- Louise Lowe for Laundry
- Niall Henry for The Poor Mouth
- Gavin Quinn for All That Fall

Best Set

- Paul O'Mahony for Pygmalion
- **Jamie Vartan** for Misterman
- Sabine Dargent for The Crucible

Best Costumes

- **Joan O’Clery** for Peer Gynt
- Peter O'Brien for Pygmalion
- Gaby Rooney for The Lulu House

Best Lighting

- Adam Silverman for Misterman
- **Aedin Cosgrove** for All That Fall
- Ciaran Bagnall for Guidelines

Best Sound

- **Jimmy Eadie** for All That Fall
- Mel Mercier for Sétanta
- Carl Kennedy and Tarab for Peer Gynt

Best Production

- The Lyric Theatre, Belfast for The Crucible
- Landmark Productions and Galway Arts Festival for Misterman
- **ANU Productions** for Laundry
- Pan Pan Theatre for All That Fall

Best New Play

- Fight Night written by Gavin Kostick and directed by Bryan Burroughs for Rise Productions in association with Bewleys Cafe Theatre
- No Romance written by Nancy Harris and directed by Wayne Jordan for The Abbey Theatre
- **Trade** written by Mark O’Halloran, directed by Tom Creed for Thisispopbaby
- Silent written by Pat Kinevane, directed by Jim Culleton for Fishamble

Best Opera Production

- Opera Theatre Company, for The Magic Flute, by Mozart
- **NI Opera**, for Tosca, by Giacomo Puccini
- Wexford Festival Opera, for La Cour de Celimene, by Ambroise Thomas
- Wexford Festival Opera , for Maria, by Roman Statkowski

Judges Special Award

- Val Sherlock
- The Lyric Theatre
- Fabulous Beast Dance Theatre
- **Landmark Productions**

=== 2012 awards ===
(Winners in bold):

Best Actor

- **Declan Conlon** as Christy in The House
- Garrett Lombard as Tom in Conversations on a Homecoming
- Aaron McCusker as Algernon Moncrieff in The Importance of Being Earnest
- Marty Rea as Michael in A Whistle in the Dark

Best Actress

- Cathy Belton as Mary in The House Keeper
- Caitriona Ennis as Young Girl in The Boys of Foley Street
- **Catherine Walker** as Maeve Brennan in The Talk of the Town
- Eileen Walsh as Betty in A Whistle in the Dark

Best Supporting Actor

- Lorcan Cranitch as William Shawn in The Talk of the Town
- Gavin Drea as Des in A Whistle in the Dark
- **Aaron Monaghan** as Liam in Conversations on a Homecoming
- Owen Roe as Shelley Levene in Glengarry Glen Ross

Best Supporting Actress

- Jacqueline Boatswain as Mrs Muller in Doubt – A Parable
- Grace Kiely as Millie in The Mai
- Eleanor Methven as Mother in The House
- **Marie Mullen** as Missus in Conversations on a Homecoming

Best Director

- **Annabelle Comyn** for The House
- Andrew Flynn for Port Authority
- Louise Lowe for The Boys of Foley Street
- Oliver Mears for The Turn of the Screw

Best Set

- Joe Vanek for Orfeo
- **Jamie Vartan** for A Village Romeo and Juliet
- Naomi Wilkinson for Alice in Funderland

Best Costumes

- Richard Kent for Titanic (Scenes from the British Wreck Commissioner’s Enquiry, 1912)
- **Peter O’Brien** for The Talk of the Town
- Lisa Zagone for Pagliacci

Best Lighting

- Simon Corder for L’arlesiana
- **Thomas Kluth** for The Barber of Seville
- Nick McCall for The Great Goat Bubble

Best Sound

- Carl Kennedy for Doubt - A Parable
- **Little John Nee** for Sparkplug
- Tom Speers for Macklin: Method and Madness

Best Production

- Abbey Theatre and THISISPOPBABY for Alice in Funderland
- AC Productions for Pinter X 4
- **Druid Theatre Company** for DruidMurphy
- WillFredd Theatre and Absolut Fringe Festival for Farm

Best New Play

- Quietly written by Owen McCafferty
- **The House Keeper** written by Morna Regan
- The Life and Sort of Death of Eric Argyle written by Ross Dungan
- Halcyon Days written by Deirdre Kinahan

Best Opera Production

- **Pagliacci** composed by Ruggero Leoncavallo for Everyman Palace Theatre and Cork Operatic Society
- The Turn of the Screw composed by Benjamin Britten for Northern Ireland Opera
- FLÅTPÄCK composed by Tom Lane for Ulysses Opera Theatre
- A Village Romeo and Juliet composed by Frederick Delius for Wexford Festival Opera

Judges Special Award

- Blue Teapot Theatre Company
- **Karl Shiels**
- Stephen Rea
- Tom Creed and the city of Cork

=== 2013 awards ===
(Winners in bold):

Best Actor

- Rhys Dunlop for Punk Rock
- Ciaran Hinds for Our Few and Evil Days
- Cillian Murphy for Ballyturk
- **Lewis J. Stadlen** for The Price

Best Actress

- **Sinéad Cusack** for Our Few and Evil Days
- Aoife Duffin for A Girl is a Half-Formed Thing
- Marie Mullen for Bailegangaire
- Judith Roddy for Pentecost

Best Supporting Actor

- Des Keogh for Dreamland
- Mark Lambert for Twelfth Night
- **Simon O’Gorman** for Sive
- Ian Toner for Punk Rock

Best Supporting Actress

- Caitriona Ennis for Spinning
- **Kate Gilmore** for Breathless
- Bríd Ní Neachtain for Sive
- Aisling O’Sullivan for Bailegangaire

Best Director

- **Selina Cartmell** for Punk Rock
- Jimmy Fay for Pentecost
- Conall Morrison for Sive & She Stoops to Conquer
- Enda Walsh for Ballyturk

Best Set Design

- Paul Wills for Our Few and Evil Days
- Jamie Vartan for Ballyturk
- **Alyson Cummins** for Pentecost
- Mario Beck for Waiting in Line

Best Sound Design

- Carl Kennedy for Mr Foley the Radio Operator
- Tom Lane & Rob Moloney for Between Trees and Water
- Fergus O’Hare for Punk Rock and Pentecost
- **Teho Teardo/ Helen Atkinson** for Ballyturk

Best Costume Design

- **Mike Britton** for How Many Miles to Babylon
- Catherine Fay for Breaking Dad and Our Few and Evil Days
- Niamh Lunny for Heartbreak House
- Peter O’Brien for An Ideal Husband

Best Lighting Design

- **Ciaran Bagnall** for Pentecost
- John Comiskey for Sive
- Adam Silverman for Ballyturk
- Chahine Yayrovan for The Vortex and Punk Rock

Best Production

- Abbey Theatre for Our Few and Evil Days
- **Landmark Productions for Ballyturk**
- Lyric Theatre for Punk Rock
- Wildebeest Theatre Company for On the Wire

Best New Play

- Conservatory by Michael West
- Dreamland by Jim Nolan
- The Mariner by Hugo Hamilton
- **Our Few and Evil Days** by Mark O’Rowe
- Petals by Gillian Greer

Best Opera

- Der Vampyr by Heinrich Marschner, directed by Michael Barker-Caven and John O’Brien for Everyman and Cork Operatic Society
- The Rape of Lucretia by Benjamin Britten, directed by Michael Barker-Caven for Irish Youth Opera and Wexford Festival Opera
- **Silent Night by Kevin Puts**, directed by Tomer Zvulun for Wexford Festival Opera
- Macbeth by William Shakespeare, directed by Oliver Mears for Northern Ireland Opera

Judges Special Award

- Limerick City of Culture: Former programmers and the current administration for using the city in the most imaginative way to rebrand Limerick as a beacon of artistic endeavour
- Lyric Theatre: For a consistently high standard of productions in a most welcoming venue
- The Lir: For producing skilled graduates of a very high calibre
- Stage managers and technicians: For keeping the show on the road after opening night and for loyal support to cast and creatives

=== 2014 awards ===
Best Actor

- Denis Conway for his role as Irish Man in the Gate Theatre production of Tom Murphy’s The Gigli Concert
- Adrian Dunbar for his role as Tommy in the Dublin Theatre Festival and Lyric Theatre production of Conor McPherson’s The Night Alive
- Mark O'Halloran for his role as Donal Davoren in the Abbey Theatre/ Lyric Theatre production of Sean O’Casey’s The Shadow of a Gunman
- **Marty Rea** for his role as King Richard 11 in DruidShakespeare

Best Actress

- Cathy Belton for her role as Sal in the Galway International Arts Festival production of The Matchbox by Frank McGuinness
- **Derbhle Crotty** for her role as King Henry 1V in DruidShakespeare
- Susan Lynch for her role as Hester Swane in the Abbey Theatre production of By the Bog of Cats by Marina Carr
- Aisling O'Sullivan for her roles as Hal/King Henry V in DruidShakespeare

Best Supporting Actor

- Peter Campion for his role as Katurian in the Decadent, in association with the Lyric Theatre, production of Martin McDonagh’s The Pillowman
- Brian Gleeson for his role as Sean in the Landmark Productions in association with MCD, production of Enda Walsh’s The Walworth Farce
- **Laurence Kinlan** for his role as Doc in the Dublin Theatre Festival and Lyric Theatre production of The Night Alive by Conor McPherson
- Rory Nolan for his role as Falstaff in DruidShakespeare

Best Supporting Actress

- Clare Barrett for her role as Aoife/Margaret Gaj in the Rough Magic production of The Train by Arthur Riordan and Bill Whelan
- Dawn Bradfield for her role as Mona in the Gate Theatre production of The Gigli Concert
- Amy McAllister for her role as Minnie Powell in the Abbey Theatre and the Lyric Theatre production of Sean O’Casey’s The Shadow of a Gunman
- **Abigail McGibbon** for her role as Sandra in the Rough Magic production of Everything Between Us by David Ireland.

Best Director

- Grace Dyas for the THEATREclub production of The Game
- **Garry Hynes** for DruidShakespeare
- Wayne Jordan for the Abbey Theatre and Lyric Theatre production of Sean O’Casey’s The Shadow of a Gunman and for the Abbey Theatre production of a new version of Oedipus by Sophocles
- Pat Kiernan for the Corcadorca and Eat My Noise production of Gentrification by Enda Walsh

Best Set Design

- **Sarah Bacon** for the Abbey Theatre production of The Shadow of a Gunman
- Aedín Cosgrove for the Abbey Theatre production of A Midsummer Night's Dream
- Francis O'Connor for DruidShakespeaqre
- Ciaran O'Melia for the Gate Theatre production of Shakespeare’s Romeo and Juliet

Best Sound Design

- Denis Clohessy for the Brokentalkers and junk ensemble production of It Folds
- Gregory Clarke and Conor Linehan for DruidShakespeare
- **Jimmy Eadie** for the Dead Centre production of Chekov’s First Play
- Tom Lane for the Abbey Theatre production of Oedipus by Sophocles in a new version by Wayne Jordan

Best Costume Design

- Sarah Bacon the Abbey Theatre production of The Shadow of a Gunman
- Catherine Fay for the Gate Theatre production of Romeo and Juliet
- Monica Frawley for the Abbey Theatre production of By the Bog of Cats
- **Doreen McKenna and Francis O'Connor** for DruidShakespeare

Best Lighting Design

- Aedín Cosgrove for the Abbey Theatre production of A Midsummer Night's Dream
- Sinéad Wallace for the Abbey Theatre production of Oedipus
- **Sarah Jane Shiels** for the Brokentalkers and junk ensemble production of It Folds and ANU Production of PALS – The Irish at Gallipoli
- Adam Silverman for the Landmark Productions and Wide Open Opera production of The Last Hotel

Best Production

- Chekhov's First Play: a Dead Centre production of Chekhov’s First Play by Anton Chekhov
- The Gigli Concert: a Gate Theatre Production
- PALS – The Irish at Gallipoli: ANU Production in association with the National Museum of Ireland and Department of Arts, Heritage and the Gaeltacht with the National Archives of Ireland and ICTU
- DruidShakespeare: a co-production with Lincoln Center Festival NYC of Richard 11 ( Parts 1 & 2 ) and Henry V by William Shakespeare in a new adaptation by Mark O’Rowe,

Best New Play

- **Scorch** by Stacey Gregg produced by Prime Cut Productions in association with The MAC and Outburst Arts
- The Night Alive by Conor McPherson produced by Dublin Theatre Festival and Lyric Theatre, Belfast
- The Matchbox by Frank McGuinness produced by the Galway International Arts Festival
- Luck Just Kissed You Hello by Amy Conroy produced by HotForTheatre and Galway International Arts Festival

Best Opera

- Agrippina: the Irish Youth Opera’s production of Handel’s Agrippina, a co-production with Northern Ireland Opera in association with the Irish Chamber Orchestra and the Lime Tree Theatre Limerick
- Faust: The Everyman and Cork Operatic Society production of Gounod’s Faust
- Gugliemo Ratcliff: the Wexford Festival Opera production of Guglielmo Ratcliff in association with the Italian Institute of Culture
- The Last Hotel: the Landmark Productions and Wide Open Opera production of The Last Hotel by Donnacha Dennehy and Enda Walsh

Judges Special Award

- Druid Shakespeare for the way in which the company has assembled and enabled a group of actors to work together as a true ensemble, the pinnacle of this rare achievement being its 2015 Druid Shakespeare production
- Blue Raincoat Theatre Company, Sligo, for its imaginative restoration of the theatre of W B Yeats as part of its A Country Under Wave programme
- **Lian Bell** for leading the wakingthefeminists movement with courage and conviction, highlighting the inequalities in Irish theatre and advocating for sustainable change.
- Galway International Arts Festival for its consistently supportive role as co-producer to the independent theatre sector

=== 2022 awards ===
Best Actor

- Owen Roe for his role as Thomas in the Gate Theatre production of Sebastian Barry's The Steward of Christendom

Best Actress

- Janet Moran for her role as Mal in the Fishamble: the New Play Company production of Eugene O’Brien's Heaven

Best Supporting Actor

- Rory Nolan for his role in the Abbey Theatre production of Anthony Simpson-Pike's An Octoroon

Best Supporting Actress

- Anna Healy for her performances in Abbey Theatre's Portia Coughlan, Druid's The Last Return and, Corcadorca Theatre Company's The Spin

Best Director

- Judy Hegarty Lovett for the production of The Realistic Joneses

Best Set

- Aedín Cosgrove in Dead Centre's production of Good Sex

Best Costume

- Madeleine Boyd for Wexford Festival Opera's production of Lalla-Roukh

Best Lighting

- James C McFetridge for Lyric Theatre's production of Big Man

Best Sound

- Carl Kennedy for Gate Theatre and Theatre Lovett's production of The Tin Soldier
- Conor Linehan for Gate Theatre and Theatre Lovett's production of The Tin Soldier
- Olesya Zdorovetkska for Gate Theatre and Theatre Lovett's production of The Tin Soldier
- Louis Lovett for Gate Theatre and Theatre Lovett's production of The Tin Soldier

Best Movement

- David Bolger for Blackwater Valley Festival Opera's production of Orfeo ed Euridice and CoisCéim Dance Theatre's production of Go to Blazes

Best Ensemble

- Druid's production of The Last Return

Best Production

- Northern Ireland Opera's production of Into the Woods

Best New Play

- Fishamble: the New Play Company's production of Heaven by Eugene O’Brien

Best Opera

- Opera Collective Ireland and Kilkenny Arts Festival's production of Semele

Judges’ Special Award

- Loughlin Deegan

Best Video Design

- Mags Mulvey with Aisling Ghéar Theatre Company for Minimal Human Contact

The Irish Times Special Tribute Award

- Bosco Hogan

Audience Choice Award

- No Magic Pill
