= Dublin Fringe Festival =

Annual arts festival in Dublin, Ireland established in 1980

- Genre: Performing Arts festival
- Frequency: Annually
- Location: Dublin
- Years active: 1 January 1980 – present
- Inaugurated: 1 January 1980; 46 years ago
- People: Ruth McGowan (CEO)
- Website: fringefest.com

The Dublin Fringe Festival is an annual curated arts festival in Dublin, Ireland focusing mainly on theatre. The festival allows artists to submit their work via an application which is subsequently reviewed by the programme manager. The festival is open to both Irish and international participants.

The festival started in 1980 as a small independent festival over a weekend and expanded into a sixteen-day festival, annually held in September and focuses on new and emerging artists. The Dublin Fringe has live entertainment as well as performances in dance, theatre, live art, visual art, and music.

== History ==
The Dublin fringe festival was initially founded in 1980 during a recession and held at various times throughout the 1980s without significant media attention or funding.

In 1995, Bedrock Productions, with some support from the established Dublin Theatre Festival and Arts office of Dublin City Council, created a revived Dublin Fringe Festival, to "promote and showcase the work of small and vibrant theatre companies and theatre makers". In the first year, Conor McPherson's This Lime Tree Bower premiered, and in 1996 Enda Walsh's Disco Pigs took off from The International Bar.

Directors who have presented works at the festival have included Jimmy Fay (1995–1996), Ali Curran (1997–2000), Vallejo Gantner (2001 -2005), Wolfgang Hoffmann (2006–2007), Roise Goan (2008–2013), and Kris Nelson (since 2014).

Successful works from past Fringe Festivals have included early plays by Conor McPherson, Enda Walsh, Owen McCafferty, Shane O’Reilly, Corn Exchange, Loose Canon, Pan Pan Theatre Company, WillFredd Theatre, Dead Centre, One Two One Two, Semper Fi, Anu Productions,, Danielle Galligan and Eva O'Connor.

== Venues ==
Each performance takes place in a venue which is deemed most suitable to the show. This can range from a number of cafes and theatres, as well as less traditional venues such as the Liffey Boardwalk or on a Dublin bus.

For a number of years until 2009, The Spiegeltent was a major part of the festival. This tent was erected in several sites including at Georges Dock. The Dublin Fringe Festival and Spiegeltent have attracted numerous shows, including the cabaret/variety show La Clique.

== Sponsors ==
Past sponsors include Absolut vodka who sponsored the events between 2009 and 2012, as part of a four-year deal.
