= Disco Pigs =

2001 film by Kirsten Sheridan

- Directed by: Kirsten Sheridan
- Written by: Enda Walsh
- Produced by: Ed Guiney
- Starring: Elaine Cassidy; Cillian Murphy; Zoë Gibney; Sarah Gallagher; Charles Bark
- Cinematography: Igor Jadue-Lillo; Peter Robertson
- Edited by: Ben Yeates
- Music by: Gavin Friday; Maurice Seezer
- Distributed by: Renaissance Films
- Release date: 16 November 2001
- Running time: 93 minutes
- Country: Ireland
- Language: English

Disco Pigs is a 2001 Irish coming of age romantic crime film directed by Kirsten Sheridan and written by Enda Walsh, who adapted it from his 1996 play of the same name. Cillian Murphy and Elaine Cassidy star as two young people from Cork who have a lifelong, but unhealthy, friendship that is imploding as they approach adult life.

== Plot ==
The film revolves around the intense relationship of the two teenage protagonists, Darren (Cillian Murphy) and Sinéad (Elaine Cassidy), who call each other "Pig" and "Runt", respectively. Pig and Runt were born at the same hospital at nearly the same time and grow up next door to each other. It brings about an extremely close relationship between the two. They live in their own world and rarely interact with others; when they do, it's mostly to express their hostility toward them. Their relationship, while very intense and unhealthy, remains platonic until just before their 17th birthday.

Around this time, Runt catches and reciprocates the attention of another young man, Marky (Darren Healy), from their school just as Pig develops romantic feelings for Runt. As their birthday draws closer, Pig becomes more volatile and violent, and his new feelings become obvious to Runt when he kisses her after a rampage at a nightclub. Runt does not know how to reject him and they continue their friendship, though relations between them are markedly awkward. Their relationship finally raises concerns at their school. With the cooperation of her parents and Pig's single mother, Runt, considered the more adaptive of the two, is sent away to a boarding school. Pig is devastated by this and decides to run away and retrieve Runt.

Even though Runt is paralyzed with uncertainty and fear at the boarding school, unsure of how to live her daily life without Pig, she starts to adapt, even befriending another girl. On their 17th birthday, Pig arrives at Runt's school and asks her to leave with him, which she does. Elated at their reunion, the two eventually chance upon a nightclub called The Palace. There, Runt sees Marky again and dances with him. In a fit of jealous rage, Pig beats Marky until he dies. The two flee the club and take a taxi to the beach where they often spend time and make love. In the morning, Pig wordlessly allows Runt to smother him, knowing the punishment awaiting him. Runt stares out to the ocean, wondering what the rest of her life will be like.

== Characters ==
Darren/"Pig" is portrayed by Cillian Murphy, who also originally played the part in the stage version. Runt is the only person Pig knows well. Pig also has an extreme hatred for public displays of affection. He cannot begin to comprehend a world where Runt does not exist. Together, they create a surreal world where there is little division between reality and dreams and Pig's and Runt's two personas. Pig is a strange, volatile dreamer. Charles Bark portrays Young Pig.

Sinéad/"Runt" is portrayed by Elaine Cassidy. She is the calmer of the two characters. When events involving Pig get too wild, Runt steps in quietly. Although the less voiced of the two, she is the more independent. Eileen Walsh played this role on stage. Sarah Gallagher portrays Young Runt.
