= Gavin Kostick =

Irish playwright

Gavin Kostick is a playwright, dramaturge at the LIR academy, Dublin, and literary manager of Fishamble: The New Play Company. He founded the Show in a Bag series of plays.

== Works ==
Gavin Kostick's dramatic works include The Ash Fire (1992), winner of the Stewart Parker Trust Award, which is based loosely on the experiences of his grandfather who entered Ireland after he 'jumped ship in the wrong port'.

Kostick's other plays include Jack Ketch’s Gallows Jig (1994), The Flesh Addict (1996), Doom Raider (2000), The Asylum Ball (2000), Contact (2002), The Medusa (2003), a new interpretation of Homer's Odyssey (2023), Fight Night (2010), Swing (2013), At the Ford (2015), Games People Play (2015), winner of the Best New Play at the Irish Times Theatre Awards, Pocket Music Gym Swim Party (2019), and Invitation to a Journey (2016). After gathering oral histories from Belfast's Jewish community, Gavin Kostick wrote This is What we Sang (2009), a play that was performed at the TriBeCa Synagogue (New York) and featured at the 2011 American Conference of Irish Studies.

Gavin Kostick was the librettist for Raymond Deane’s opera The Alma Fetish. In 2007, he won the Spirit of the Fringe Award at the Dublin Fringe Festival for his five-hour performance as Marlow from Joseph Conrad's Heart of Darkness.

== Personal life ==
He is the brother of the novelist and historian Conor Kostick.
