= Irish National Opera =

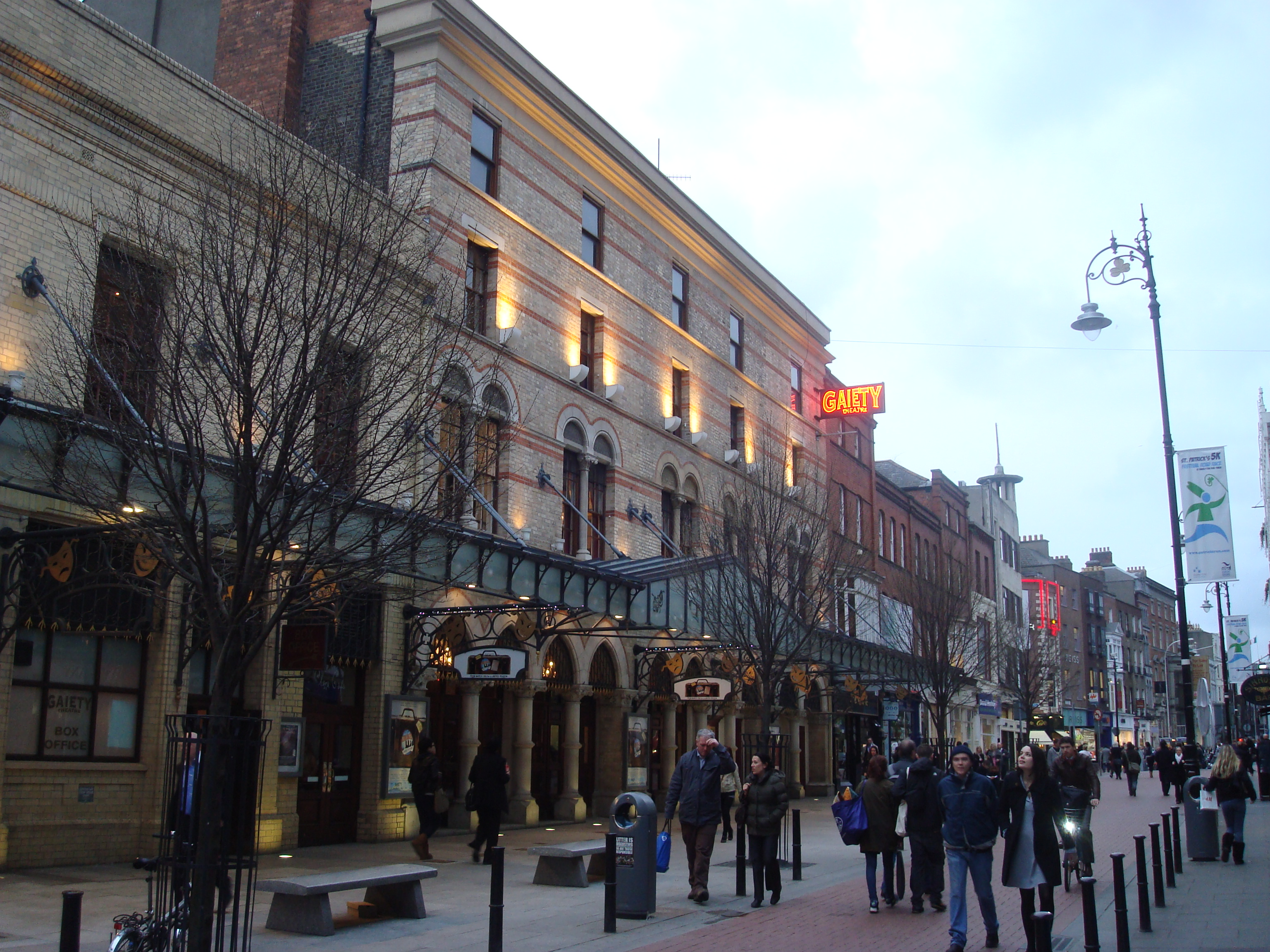
Dublin's Gaiety Theatre, one of the theatres used by Irish National Opera.

Irish National Opera is one of Ireland's largest arts organisations and presents opera in Dublin, on tour across Ireland and internationally. Irish National Opera was created from a merger of the Opera Theatre Company (OTC) and Wide Open Opera in 2017 and launched in January 2018.

Irish National Opera was officially launched on 9 January 2018 with an inaugural concert, The Big Bang! at the National Concert Hall in Dublin. A national tour of Thomas Adès's chamber opera Powder Her Face followed in March 2018.
