= List of awards and nominations received by Cillian Murphy =

Cillian Murphy awards and nominations
- Murphy at the 2025 Toronto International Film Festival
Awards and nominations
Award	Wins	Nominations
Academy Awards	1	1
BAFTA Awards	1	4
Critics Choice Awards	1	3
Golden Globes	1	2
Screen Actors Guild Awards	2	2

Totals (Note: Certain award groups do not simply award one winner. They acknowledge several different recipients, have runners-up, and have third place. Since this is a specific recognition and is different from losing an award, runner-up mentions are considered wins in this award tally. For simplification and to avoid errors, each award in this list has been presumed to have had a prior nomination.)
- Wins: 44
- Nominations: 116

Irish actor Cillian Murphy has received many accolades for his work on stage and screen including an Academy Award, a BAFTA Award, a Golden Globe Award, and two Screen Actors Guild Awards.

He won the Academy Award, BAFTA Award, Screen Actors Guild Award, and Golden Globe Award for his performance as physicist J. Robert Oppenheimer in Christopher Nolan's biographical thriller film Oppenheimer (2023). In 2023, he received a BAFTA TV Award nomination for his performance as Tommy Shelby in the BBC series Peaky Blinders (2013–2022).

== Awards and nominations ==
Awards and nominations received by Colin Farrell
Organisations	Year (Note: Indicates the year of ceremony)	Category	Nominated work	Result	Ref.
AACTA International Awards	2024	Best Actor	Oppenheimer	Won	
AARP Movies for Grownups Awards	2024	Best Ensemble	Oppenheimer	Nominated (Note: Shared with the cast)	
Academy Awards	2024	Best Actor	Oppenheimer	Won	
Alliance of Women Film Journalists	2024	Best Actor	Oppenheimer	Nominated	
Alliance of Women Film Journalists	2024	Most Egregious Lovers' Age Difference	Oppenheimer	Won (Note: Shared with Florence Pugh)	
Astra Film Awards	2024	Best Actor	Oppenheimer	Nominated	
Astra Film Awards	2024	Best Cast Ensemble	Oppenheimer	Nominated	
Austin Film Critics Association	2024	Best Actor	Oppenheimer	Won	
Austin Film Critics Association	2024	Best Ensemble	Oppenheimer	Won	
BAFTA Film Awards	2007	Rising Star Award	—N/a	Nominated	
BAFTA Film Awards	2024	Best Actor in a Leading Role	Oppenheimer	Won	
BAFTA Film Awards	2026	Outstanding British Film	Steve	Nominated (Note: Shared with Tim Mielants, Alan Moloney and Max Porter)	
BAFTA Television Awards	2023	Best Actor	Peaky Blinders	Nominated	
Boston Online Film Critics Association	2023	Best Actor	Oppenheimer	Won	
Boston Online Film Critics Association	2023	Best Ensemble	Oppenheimer	Won	
Boston Society of Film Critics	2023	Best Actor	Oppenheimer	Runner-up (Note: Tied with Koji Yakusho for Perfect Days)	
Boston Society of Film Critics	2023	Best Ensemble Cast	Oppenheimer	Won	
British Independent Film Awards	2006	Best Actor	The Wind That Shakes the Barley	Nominated	
British Independent Film Awards	2007	Best Actor	Sunshine	Nominated	
British Independent Film Awards	2012	Best Supporting Actor	Broken	Nominated	
British Independent Film Awards	2025	Best Lead Performance	Steve	Nominated	
Capri Hollywood International Film Festival	2024	Best Ensemble Cast	Oppenheimer	Won	
Chicago Film Critics Association	2023	Best Actor	Oppenheimer	Nominated	
Critics' Choice Awards	2018	Best Acting Ensemble	Dunkirk	Nominated	
Critics' Choice Awards	2024	Best Acting Ensemble	Oppenheimer	Won	
Critics' Choice Awards	2024	Best Actor	Oppenheimer	Nominated	
Critics' Choice Super Awards	2022	Best Actor in a Horror Movie	A Quiet Place Part II	Nominated	
Czech Lion Awards	2017	Best Actor in Leading Role	Anthropoid	Nominated	
Dallas–Fort Worth Film Critics Association	2023	Best Actor	Oppenheimer	Won	
Dorian Awards	2024	Film Performance of the Year	Oppenheimer	Nominated	
Drama Desk Awards	2012	Outstanding Solo Performance	Misterman	Won	
Dublin Film Critics' Circle	2006	Best Actor	The Wind That Shakes the Barley	4th place	
Dublin Film Critics' Circle	2023	Best Actor	Oppenheimer	Won	
Dublin Film Critics' Circle	2024	Best Actor	Small Things Like These	Runner-up	
Empire Awards	2003	Best Newcomer	28 Days Later	Nominated	
European Film Awards	2006	European Actor	Breakfast on Pluto	Nominated	
European Film Awards	2006	European Actor	The Wind That Shakes the Barley	Nominated	
Festival International de Programmes Audiovisuels	2014	FIPA d'or Best Actor – Series	Peaky Blinders	Won	
Florida Film Critics Circle	2017	Best Ensemble	Dunkirk	Runner-up	
Florida Film Critics Circle	2023	Best Actor	Oppenheimer	Nominated	
Florida Film Critics Circle	2023	Best Ensemble	Oppenheimer	Nominated	
Georgia Film Critics Association	2024	Best Actor	Oppenheimer	Won	
Georgia Film Critics Association	2024	Best Ensemble	Oppenheimer	Won	
Golden Globes	2006	Best Actor in a Motion Picture – Musical or Comedy	Breakfast on Pluto	Nominated	
Golden Globes	2024	Best Actor in a Motion Picture – Drama	Oppenheimer	Won	
GQ Men of the Year Awards	2006	Actor of the Year	The Wind That Shakes the Barley	Won	
GQ Men of the Year Awards	2017	Television Actor of the Year	Peaky Blinders	Won	
Hollywood Critics Association Midseason Awards	2021	Best Supporting Actor	A Quiet Place Part II	Won	
Houston Film Critics Society	2024	Best Actor	Oppenheimer	Nominated	
Houston Film Critics Society	2024	Best Ensemble Cast	Oppenheimer	Nominated	
IFTA Film & Drama Awards	2003	Best Lead Actor – Film	28 Days Later	Nominated	
IFTA Film & Drama Awards	2003	Best Actor in a Film – Public Vote	—N/a	Nominated	
IFTA Film & Drama Awards	2005	Best Lead Actor – Film	Red Eye	Nominated	
IFTA Film & Drama Awards	2005	Best Supporting Actor – Film	Batman Begins	Nominated	
IFTA Film & Drama Awards	2007	Best Lead Actor – Film	Breakfast on Pluto	Won	
IFTA Film & Drama Awards	2007	Best Lead Actor – Film	The Wind That Shakes the Barley	Nominated	
IFTA Film & Drama Awards	2008	Best Lead Actor – Film	Sunshine	Nominated	
IFTA Film & Drama Awards	2011	Best Lead Actor – Film	Perrier's Bounty	Nominated	
IFTA Film & Drama Awards	2011	Best Supporting Actor – Film	Inception	Nominated	
IFTA Film & Drama Awards	2015	Best Lead Actor – TV Drama	Peaky Blinders	Nominated	
IFTA Film & Drama Awards	2017	Best Lead Actor – TV Drama	Peaky Blinders	Won	
IFTA Film & Drama Awards	2018	Best Lead Actor – TV Drama	Peaky Blinders	Won	
IFTA Film & Drama Awards	2020	Best Lead Actor – TV Drama	Peaky Blinders	Nominated	
IFTA Film & Drama Awards	2024	Best Lead Actor – Film	Oppenheimer	Won	
IFTA Film & Drama Awards	2025	Best Lead Actor – Film	Small Things Like These	Won	
IFTA Film & Drama Awards	2026	Best Lead Actor – Film	Steve	Nominated	
IndieWire Critics Poll	2023	Best Performance	Oppenheimer	4th place	
The Irish Times Irish Theatre Awards	2012	Best Actor	Misterman	Won	
The Irish Times Irish Theatre Awards	2015	Best Actor	Ballyturk	Nominated	
The Irish Times Irish Theatre Awards	2019	Best Actor	Grief Is the Thing with Feathers	Won	
Kansas City Film Critics Circle	2024	Best Performance	Oppenheimer	4th place	
London Film Critics' Circle	2006	British Supporting Actor of the Year	Batman Begins	Nominated	
London Film Critics' Circle	2024	Actor of the Year	Oppenheimer	Nominated	
London Film Critics' Circle	2024	British/Irish Performer of the Year	Oppenheimer	Nominated	
MTV Movie Awards	2004	Best Breakthrough Performance	28 Days Later	Nominated	
MTV Movie Awards	2004	Best Trans-Atlantic Breakthrough Performer	—N/a	Nominated	
MTV Movie Awards	2006	Best Villain	Batman Begins	Nominated	
National Film Awards UK	2020	Best Actor in a TV Series	Peaky Blinders	Nominated	
National Film Awards UK	2026	Best Actor	Steve	Nominated	
National Film Awards UK	2026	Best Producer — Film & TV	Peaky Blinders: The Immortal Man	Nominated (Note: Shared with Guy Heeley)	
National Society of Film Critics	2024	Best Actor	Oppenheimer	3rd place	
National Television Awards	2017	Best Drama Performance	Peaky Blinders	Nominated	
National Television Awards	2019	Best Drama Performance	Peaky Blinders	Nominated	
National Television Awards	2020	Best Drama Performance	Peaky Blinders	Won	
National Television Awards	2022	Best Drama Performance	Peaky Blinders	Won	
New York Film Critics Online	2023	Best Actor	Oppenheimer	Won	
New York Film Critics Online	2023	Best Ensemble Cast	Oppenheimer	Won	
Online Film Critics Society	2004	Best Breakthrough Performance	28 Days Later	Nominated	
Online Film Critics Society	2024	Best Actor	Oppenheimer	3rd place	
Palm Springs International Film Festival	2024	Desert Palm Achievement Award, Actor	Oppenheimer	Won	
People's Choice Awards	2024	The Drama Movie Star of the Year	Oppenheimer	Nominated	
People's Choice Awards	2024	The Male Movie Star of the Year	Oppenheimer	Nominated	
San Diego Film Critics Society	2023	Best Actor	Oppenheimer	Nominated	
San Diego Film Critics Society	2023	Best Ensemble	Oppenheimer	Nominated	
San Francisco Bay Area Film Critics Circle	2024	Best Actor	Oppenheimer	Nominated	
Sant Jordi Awards	2024	Best Actor in a Foreign Film	Oppenheimer	Won	
Satellite Awards	2005	Best Actor in a Motion Picture – Comedy or Musical	Breakfast on Pluto	Nominated	
Satellite Awards	2024	Best Actor in a Motion Picture – Drama	Oppenheimer	Won	
Satellite Awards	2024	Best Ensemble – Motion Picture	Oppenheimer	Won	
Saturn Awards	2006	Best Supporting Actor	Red Eye	Nominated	
Saturn Awards	2024	Best Actor in a Film	Oppenheimer	Nominated	
Scream Awards	2006	Most Vile Villain	Batman Begins	Nominated	
Scream Awards	2007	Sci-Fi Star	Sunshine	Nominated	
Screen Actors Guild Awards	2024	Outstanding Cast in a Motion Picture	Oppenheimer	Won	
Screen Actors Guild Awards	2024	Outstanding Male Actor in a Leading Role	Oppenheimer	Won	
Seattle Film Critics Society	2024	Best Actor in a Leading Role	Oppenheimer	Nominated	
Seattle Film Critics Society	2024	Best Ensemble Cast	Oppenheimer	Nominated	
St. Louis Film Critics Association	2023	Best Actor	Oppenheimer	Nominated	
St. Louis Film Critics Association	2023	Best Ensemble	Oppenheimer	Runner-up (Note: Tied with the cast of Barbie)	
Vancouver Film Critics Circle	2024	Best Actor	Oppenheimer	Nominated	
Teen Choice Awards	2006	Choice Movie Sleazebag	Red Eye and Batman Begins	Nominated	
Washington D.C. Area Film Critics Association	2010	Best Acting Ensemble	Inception	Nominated	
Washington D.C. Area Film Critics Association	2017	Best Acting Ensemble	Dunkirk	Nominated	
Washington D.C. Area Film Critics Association	2023	Best Actor	Oppenheimer	Won	
Washington D.C. Area Film Critics Association	2023	Best Acting Ensemble	Oppenheimer	Won	
Women Film Critics Circle	2023	Best Actor	Oppenheimer	Nominated	

== See also ==
- Cillian Murphy on stage and screen
