= Cillian Murphy on stage and screen =

Screen and stage credits of Irish actor

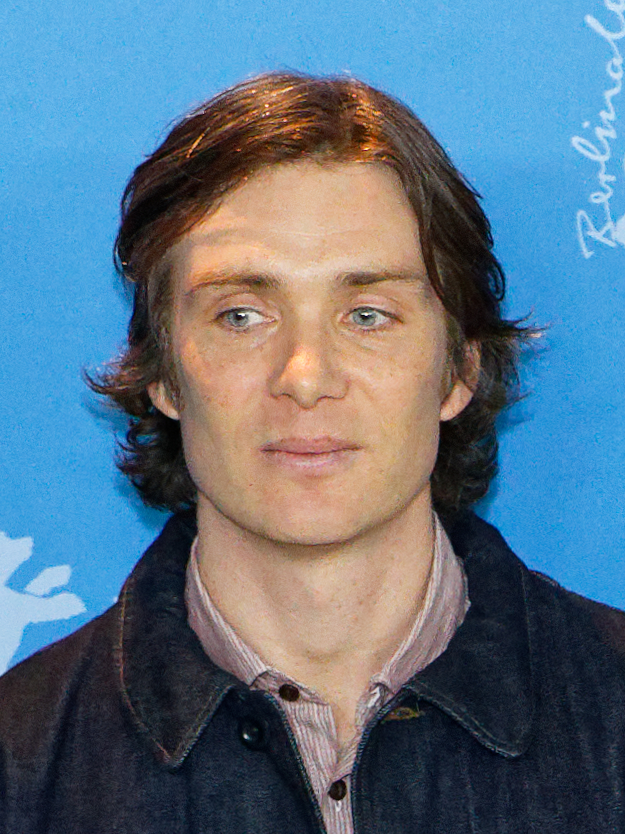
Cillian Murphy at the 67th Berlin International Film Festival

Cillian Murphy is an Irish actor who has had an extensive career in film, television and stage. Murphy made his professional debut in playwright Enda Walsh's 1996 play Disco Pigs, a role he later reprised in the 2001 screen adaptation. He later made his feature film debut as a bartender in the Irish drama Sweety Barrett (1998). While he found film and theatre work throughout the late 1990s and early 2000s, his breakthrough came with his lead role as pandemic survivor Jim in Danny Boyle's horror film 28 Days Later. Other films that followed included Intermission (2003), Red Eye (2005), The Wind That Shakes the Barley (2006), and Sunshine (2007). He portrayed a transgender Irish woman in the comedy-drama Breakfast on Pluto (2005), which earned him a Golden Globe nomination for Best Actor in a Motion Picture – Musical or Comedy. In 2011, Murphy reunited with Walsh in his play Misterman which debuted at the Galway International Arts Festival. Murphy and Walsh continued to collaborate in the latter's own Ballyturk and an adaptation of Max Porter's novel Grief Is the Thing with Feathers. He continued to act in mainstream studio films such as Tron: Legacy (2010), In Time (2011), In the Heart of the Sea (2015), and A Quiet Place Part II (2020), as well as in independent films such as Retreat (2011), Free Fire (2016), The Delinquent Season (2018), and Small Things like These (2024).

Murphy began his collaboration with filmmaker Christopher Nolan in 2005, playing the Scarecrow in The Dark Knight trilogy (2005–2012) as well as appearing in Inception (2010) and Dunkirk (2017). He portrayed J. Robert Oppenheimer in Nolan's Oppenheimer (2023), for which he won several accolades including BAFTA and Academy Award for Best Actor. In addition to his roles in film and theatre, he is known for his role as Tommy Shelby in the BBC period drama series Peaky Blinders (2013–2022), a role he reprised in the feature film Peaky Blinders: The Immortal Man (2026), which he also co-produced.

== Film ==
Key
†	Denotes works that have not yet been released

Table featuring feature films with Cillian Murphy
Year	Title	Role	Notes	Ref(s)
1997	Quando	Pat	Short film	
1998	Sweety Barrett	Pat the Barman		
1999	Eviction	Brendan McBride	Short film	
1999	At Death's Door	Young Reaper	Short film	
1999	Sunburn	Davin McDerby		
1999	The Trench	Rag Rookwood		
2000	Filleann an Feall	Ger	Short film	
2000	A Man of Few Words	Best man	Short film	
2001	On the Edge	Jonathan Breech		
2001	How Harry Became a Tree	Gus		
2001	Disco Pigs	Darren / Pig		
2001	Watchmen	Phil	Short film; also co-writer	
2002	28 Days Later	Jim		
2003	Zonad	Guy	Short film	
2003	Intermission	John		
2003	Girl with a Pearl Earring	Pieter		
2003	Cold Mountain	Bardolph		
2005	Batman Begins	Dr. Jonathan Crane / The Scarecrow		
2005	Red Eye	Jackson Rippner		
2005	Breakfast on Pluto	Patrick "Kitten" Braden		
2006	The Silent City	Soldier	Short film	
2006	The Wind That Shakes the Barley	Damien O'Donovan		
2007	Sunshine	Robert Capa		
2007	Watching the Detectives	Neil Lewis		
2008	The Dark Knight	Dr. Jonathan Crane / The Scarecrow	Cameo	
2008	The Edge of Love	William Killick		
2008	Waveriders	Narrator	Voice; Documentary	
2009	Perrier's Bounty	Michael McCrea		
2010	Peacock	John Skillpa / Emma Skillpa		
2010	Hippie Hippie Shake	Richard Neville	Unreleased	
2010	Inception	Robert Fischer		
2010	Tron: Legacy	Edward Dillinger, Jr.	Uncredited cameo	
2011	Retreat	Martin		
2011	In Time	Raymond Leon		
2012	Red Lights	Tom Buckley		
2012	Broken	Mike Kiernan		
2012	The Dark Knight Rises	Dr. Jonathan Crane / The Scarecrow	Cameo	
2013	Harriet and the Matches	Cat	Voice; Short film	
2014	Aloft	Ivan		
2014	Transcendence	Agent Donald Buchanan		
2015	In the Heart of the Sea	Matthew Joy		
2016	Anthropoid	Jozef Gabčík		
2016	Free Fire	Chris		
2017	The Party	Tom		
2017	Dunkirk	Shivering Soldier		
2018	The Overcoat	Akaky	Voice; Short film	
2018	The Delinquent Season	Jim		
2019	Anna	Lenny Miller		
2020	A Quiet Place Part II	Emmett		
2021	All of This Unreal Time	Man	Short film	
2023	Kensuke's Kingdom	Dad	Voice	
2023	Oppenheimer	J. Robert Oppenheimer		
2024	Small Things like These	Bill Furlong	Also producer	
2025	28 Years Later	—	Executive producer only	
2025	Steve	Steve	Also producer	
2026	28 Years Later: The Bone Temple	Jim	Uncredited cameo; also executive producer	
2026	Peaky Blinders: The Immortal Man	Thomas Shelby	Also producer	
2027	A Quiet Place Part III†	Emmett	Filming	
2027	Untitled Damien Chazelle film†	Inmate	Post-production	

== Television ==
Table featuring television programs with Cillian Murphy
Year(s)	Title	Role	Notes	Ref(s)
2001	The Way We Live Now	Paul Montague		
2013–2022	Peaky Blinders	Tommy Shelby	Also executive producer	
2015	Atlantic: The Wildest Ocean on Earth	Narrator	Voice; Documentary series	

== Theatre ==
Table featuring theatre roles with Cillian Murphy
Year(s)	Title	Role	Venue	Ref(s)
1996–1998	Disco Pigs	Darren/"Pig"	World tour	
1998	Much Ado About Nothing	Claudio	Kilkenny Castle	
1999	The Country Boy	Curly	Town Hall Theatre	
1999	Juno and the Paycock	Johnny Boyle	Gaiety Theatre	
2002	The Shape of Things	Adam	Gate Theatre	
2003	The Seagull	Konstantin Treplev	Edinburgh International Festival	
2004	The Playboy of the Western World	Christy Mahon	Town Hall Theatre	
2006	Love Song	Beane	Ambassadors Theatre	
2010	From Galway to Broadway and back again.	Christy Mahon	Town Hall Theatre	
2011–2012	Misterman	Thomas Magill	Galway Arts Festival; Royal National Theatre; St. Ann's Warehouse	
2014	Ballyturk	No. 1	Galway Arts Festival; Olympia Theatre; Cork Opera House; Royal National Theatre	
2018–2019	Grief is the Thing with Feathers	Crow, Dad	Black Box Theatre; O'Reilly Theatre; Barbican Centre; St. Ann's Warehouse	

== Music videos ==
Table featuring music video roles of Cillian Murphy
Year	Title	Artist	Notes	Ref(s)
2009	"The Water"	Feist		
2011	"Winter Beats"	I Break Horses		
2013	"Hold Me Forever"	Money	Director only	
2015	"The Clock"	Paul Hartnoll		
2016	"Stages"	The Frank and Walters	Voice only	
2017	"The Ways"	Allred and Broderick		
2017	"The Meetings of the Waters"	Fionn Regan		
2022	"Pana-vision"	The Smile		
2026	"Opalite"	Taylor Swift	Voice and image only	

== Video games ==
Table featuring video game roles of Cillian Murphy
Year	Title	Role	Ref(s)
2005	Batman Begins	Dr. Jonathan Crane / Scarecrow	
2023	Peaky Blinders: The King's Ransom	Tommy Shelby	

== See also ==
- List of awards and nominations received by Cillian Murphy
