= Austin Film Critics Association Award for Best Actor =

Annual film award

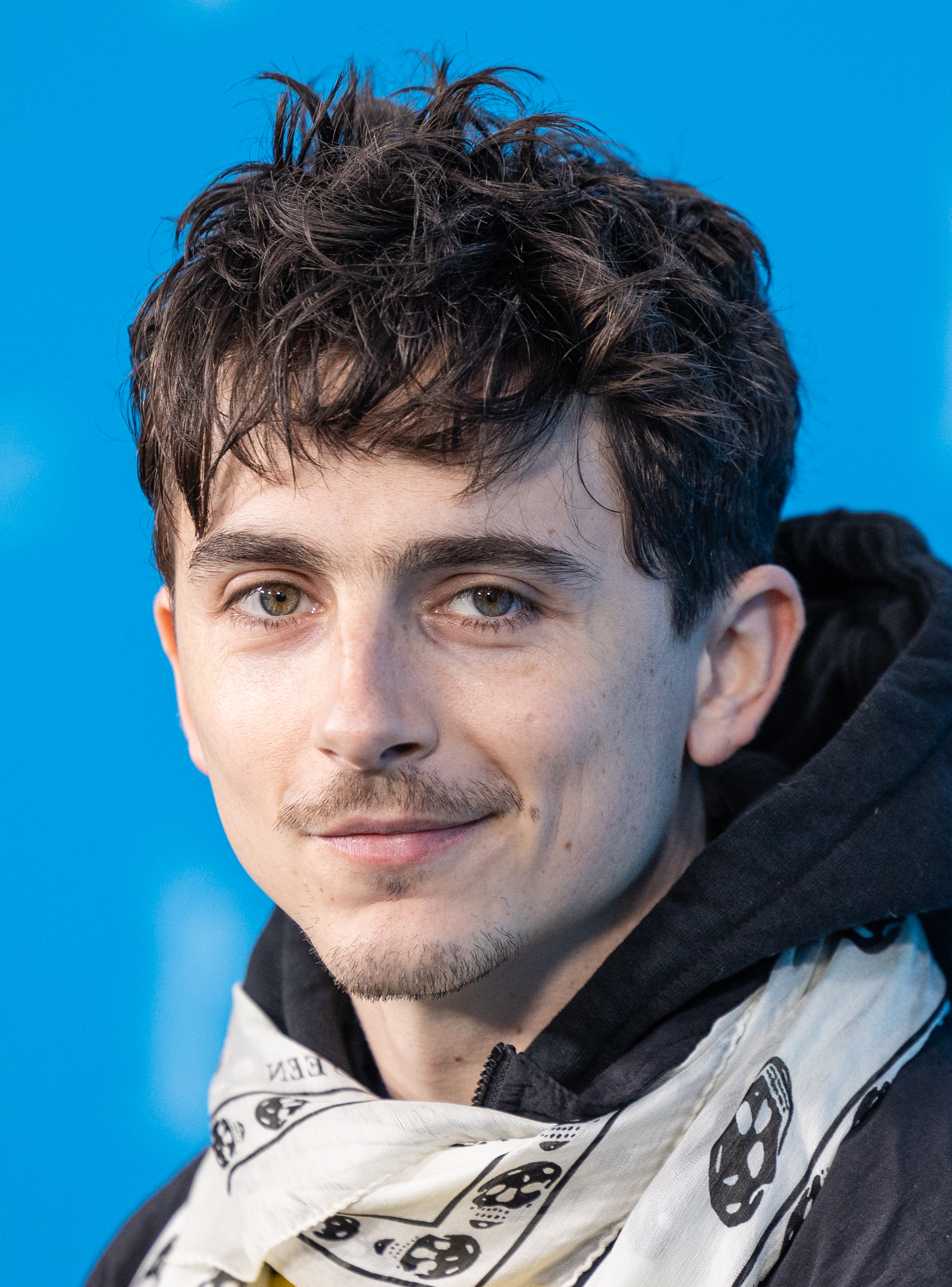
The 2025 recipient: Timothée Chalamet

The Austin Film Critics Association Award for Best Actor is one of the annual awards given out by the Austin Film Critics Association.

== Winners ==
=== 2000s ===
Year	Winner	Film	Role
2005	Philip Seymour Hoffman	Capote	Truman Capote
2006	Leonardo DiCaprio	The Departed	Trooper William "Billy" Costigan Jr.
2007	Daniel Day-Lewis	There Will Be Blood	Daniel Plainview
2008	Sean Penn	Milk	Harvey Milk
2009	Colin Firth	A Single Man	George Falconer

=== 2010s ===
Year	Winner	Film	Role
2010	Colin Firth	The King's Speech	King George VI
2011	Michael Shannon	Take Shelter	Curtis LaForche
2012	Joaquin Phoenix	The Master	Freddie Quell
2013	Chiwetel Ejiofor	12 Years a Slave	Solomon Northup
2014	Jake Gyllenhaal	Nightcrawler	Louis "Lou" Bloom
2015	Michael Fassbender	Steve Jobs	Steve Jobs
2015	Bryan Cranston	Trumbo	Dalton Trumbo
2015	Leonardo DiCaprio	The Revenant	Hugh Glass
2015	Michael B. Jordan	Creed	Adonis "Donnie" Creed
2015	Jacob Tremblay	Room	Jack Newsome
2016	Casey Affleck	Manchester by the Sea	Lee Chandler
2016	Joel Edgerton	Loving	Richard Loving
2016	Colin Farrell	The Lobster	David
2016	Ryan Gosling	La La Land	Sebastian "Seb" Wilder
2016	Denzel Washington	Fences	Troy Maxson
2017	Timothée Chalamet	Call Me by Your Name	Elio Perlman
2017	James Franco	The Disaster Artist	Tommy Wiseau
2017	Daniel Kaluuya	Get Out	Chris Washington
2017	Gary Oldman	Darkest Hour	Winston Churchill
2017	Robert Pattinson	Good Time	Constantine "Connie" Nikas
2018	Ethan Hawke	First Reformed	Reverend Ernst Toller
2018	Christian Bale	Vice	Dick Cheney
2018	Bradley Cooper	A Star is Born	Jackson "Jack" Maine
2018	Rami Malek	Bohemian Rhapsody	Freddie Mercury
2018	Joaquin Phoenix	You Were Never Really Here	Joe
2019	Adam Sandler	Uncut Gems	Howard Ratner
2019	Antonio Banderas	Pain and Glory	Salvador Mallo
2019	Leonardo DiCaprio	Once Upon a Time in Hollywood	Rick Dalton
2019	Adam Driver	Marriage Story	Charlie Barber
2019	Eddie Murphy	Dolemite Is My Name	Rudy Ray Moore

=== 2020s ===
Year	Winner	Film	Role
2020	Riz Ahmed	Sound of Metal	Ruben Stone
2020	Chadwick Boseman	Ma Rainey's Black Bottom	Levee Green
2020	Anthony Hopkins	The Father	Anthony
2020	Delroy Lindo	Da 5 Bloods	Paul
2020	Steven Yeun	Minari	Jacob Yi
2021	Nicolas Cage	Pig	Robin "Rob" Feld
2021	Benedict Cumberbatch	The Power of the Dog	Phil Burbank
2021	Andrew Garfield	tick, tick... BOOM!	Jonathan Larson
2021	Simon Rex	Red Rocket	Mikey Saber
2021	Denzel Washington	The Tragedy of Macbeth	Lord Macbeth
2022	Colin Farrell	The Banshees of Inisherin	Pádraic Súilleabháin
2022	Austin Butler	Elvis	Elvis Presley
2022	Tom Cruise	Top Gun: Maverick	Pete "Maverick" Mitchell
2022	Brendan Fraser	The Whale	Charlie
2022	Paul Mescal	Aftersun	Calum Paterson
2023	Cillian Murphy	Oppenheimer	J. Robert Oppenheimer
2023	Leonardo DiCaprio	Killers of the Flower Moon	Ernest Burkhart
2023	Paul Giamatti	The Holdovers	Paul Hunham
2023	Andrew Scott	All of Us Strangers	Adam
2023	Jeffrey Wright	American Fiction	Thelonious "Monk" Ellison
2024	Colman Domingo	Sing Sing	John "Divine G" Whitfield
2024	Adrien Brody	The Brutalist	László Tóth
2024	Daniel Craig	Queer	William Lee
2024	Ralph Fiennes	Conclave	Cardinal Thomas Lawrence
2024	Hugh Grant	Heretic	Mr. Reed
2025	Timothée Chalamet	Marty Supreme	Marty Mauser
2025	Leonardo DiCaprio	One Battle After Another	Bob Ferguson
2025	Ethan Hawke	Blue Moon	Lorenz Hart
2025	Michael B. Jordan	Sinners	Elijah "Smoke" Moore / Elias "Stack" Moore
2025	Wagner Moura	The Secret Agent	Marcelo Alves / Armando Solimões / Fernando Solimões
