= Coriolanus (soundtrack) =

Coriolanus (Original Motion Picture Soundtrack)

Film score by Ilan Eshkeri
- Released: 17 January 2012
- Recorded: 2011
- Genre: Film score
- Length: 76:59
- Label: Varèse Sarabande
- Producer: Steve McLaughlin

Ilan Eshkeri chronology
Retreat (2011)	Coriolanus (2012)	Ashes (2012)

Coriolanus (Original Motion Picture Soundtrack) is the film score to the 2012 film Coriolanus directed by Ralph Fiennes in his directorial debut and starring himself as the title character. The original score is composed by Ilan Eshkeri and was released through Varèse Sarabande on 17 January 2012.

== Background ==
Ilan Eshkeri composed the film score for Coriolanus. Eshkeri met Fiennes to discuss about Shakespearan and traditional English music. He discussed about the classical film scores from his teachers and role models, and wanted that to be the blue print for the score. But Fiennes was skeptic on traditional film music and refrained from using a standard orchestral score and envisioned a sparse, repetitive sound such as a single drum beat when a character walked on screen. Eventually, Eshkeri created an eerie score that resembled The Shining (1980).

As per Fiennes' guidance, Eshkeri began building the music up slowly, note-per-note and one rhythm at a time. Eshkeri layered sparse elements such as trumpet notes performed by jazz player John Barclay until a cohesive atmosphere has been built from the score. Eventually, an intentionally minimal and brutalistic sound has been created from the unusual textures such as the scratchy cello sounds which were out of tune and sounds mimicking breathing that aimed for a dirty sound over polished orchestral textures. Percussion and brass elements were further used to heighten the intensity of the score along with taiko drums and timpani, and custom made percussion sounds by banging bits of metal and coiled springs. The outcome resulted in an almost classical but punk rock influenced cues.

== Reception ==
Mike Saulters of Slackerwood wrote "The score from composer Ilan Eshkeri is the best work in Coriolanus. Minimalist, warlike, rhythmic percussion dominates and sets the tone in scenes where the visuals are so bleak. The end-title song, a surprising a capella performance by Lisa Zane, is reason enough to purchase the soundtrack." Phil Blanckley of Static Mass Emporium called it a personal triumph for Eshkeri having overcome the challenge of composing without the use of his usual melodic orchestration and going even further than [his] own expectations.

Lee Marshal of Screen International deciphered the score to be "sparse and military". Peter Debruge of Variety wrote that "bombastically inclined composer Ilan Eshkeri keeps the music to an appropriately subdued but nonetheless menacing level." Film Score Monthly wrote "For much of the soundtrack, we hear leitmotifs defined in the most radical way possible: by using the same bizarre sounds in totally different contexts." Brad Brevet of Comingsoon.net wrote Ilan Eshkeri's "bombastic score render[s] each battle break".

== Track listing ==
Disc 1
No.	Title	Length
1.	"Farm Attack"	3:11
2.	"Bold Pedlar"	1:39
3.	"Twa Corbies"	3:50
4.	"Red Like the Setting Summer Sun"	0:57
5.	"Lamentations of Round-Oak Waters"	5:53
6.	"Elderfather Fight"	7:43
7.	"Boat to the Priory"	1:50
8.	"What Will Become of England"	4:18
9.	"Walking Again"	4:46
10.	"Sister Brigid's Family"	3:25
11.	"Making Arrows"	1:37
12.	"Searching for Little Margaret"	2:33
13.	"I Owe This Life to You"	3:09
14.	"Robin's Death"	3:20
Total length:		48:11

Disc 2
No.	Title	Length
1.	"A Place Calling Itself Rome"	1:40
2.	"You Fragments"	1:14
3.	"Souls Of Geese"	4:07
4.	"Make You A Sword Of Me"	2:58
5.	"We Hate Alike"	1:18
6.	"And Then Men Die"	0:59
7.	"The Deeds Of Coriolanus"	4:23
8.	"Penalty Of Death"	2:57
9.	"There Is A World Elsewhere"	2:33
10.	"Starve With Feeding"	3:47
11.	"What Is Thy Name"	2:02
12.	"Milk In A Male Tiger"	3:16
13.	"Some Other Deity"	1:35
14.	"Oh Mother"	1:44
15.	"Cut Me To Pieces"	1:37
Total length:		36:10

== Legacy ==
The score was presented at the Wales Soundtrack Festival along with Shame, which also had an acclaimed soundtrack. Eshkeri further revealed that the team behind Ghost of Tsushima (2020) approached him to score music as some of them had liked his work for Coriolanus.
