= Janice Hallett =

British journalist, screenwriter, and author

Janice Hallett (born 1969) is a British journalist, screenwriter, and author of mystery novels. Her debut, The Appeal, is the UK's second bestselling fiction debut of 2021 and won for her the 2022 CWA New Blood Dagger.

She studied screenwriting at Royal Holloway, University of London and English language at University College London. In 2011, she co-wrote Retreat, a 2011 British horror-thriller film. She worked as a journalist for the Department for International Development. She also worked at Cosmetics International.

Hallett's 2022 book, The Twyford Code, was listed as one of the "Best books of 2022: Crime fiction" by the Financial Times.

In 2023, the Japanese edition of The Appeal, translated by Ran Yamada, was nominated for the Mystery Writers of Japan Award for Mystery Fiction in Translation.

== Bibliography ==
=== The Appeal series ===
- The Appeal (2021)
- The Christmas Appeal (2023) (novella)
- The Silent Appeal (2026)

=== A Box Full of Murders series ===
- A Box Full of Murders (2025)
- Death at the Museum (2026)

=== Standalone ===
- The Twyford Code (2022)
- The Mysterious Case of the Alperton Angels (2023)
- The Examiner (2024)
- The Killer Question (2025)
