= Klara and the Sun (film) =

2026 film by Taika Waititi

- Theatrical release poster
- Directed by: Taika Waititi
- Screenplay by: Taika Waititi; Dahvi Waller
- Based on: Klara and the Sun by Kazuo Ishiguro
- Produced by: David Heyman; Garrett Basch; Taika Waititi
- Starring: Jenna Ortega; Amy Adams; Mia Tharia; Aran Murphy; Steve Buscemi; Natasha Lyonne
- Cinematography: Mike Berlucchi
- Edited by: Adam Gough; Tom Eagles
- Music by: Michael Giacchino
- Production companies: Columbia Pictures; 3000 Pictures; Spyglass Media Group; HarperCollins Publishers; Heyday Films; Defender Films; Piki Films
- Distributed by: Sony Pictures Releasing
- Release dates: October 15, 2026 (BFI); October 23, 2026 (United States)
- Running time: 116 minutes
- Countries: United States; United Kingdom; New Zealand
- Language: English
- Budget: $20–44.3 million
- Box office: $3.1 million

Klara and the Sun is a 2026 dystopian science fiction film directed by Taika Waititi and adapted by Waititi and Dahvi Waller from Kazuo Ishiguro's 2021 novel. It stars Jenna Ortega, Amy Adams, Mia Tharia, Aran Murphy, Steve Buscemi, and Natasha Lyonne.

The film had its world premiere at the 70th BFI London Film Festival on October 15, 2026, and was theatrically released in the United States and the United Kingdom on October 23, 2026 by Sony Pictures Releasing. It received generally negative reviews from critics and has grossed $3.1 million worldwide against a budget of $20–44.3 million, making it a box-office bomb.

== Plot ==
In a dystopian future, Klara is an Artificial Friend, an android companion. As an older B-1 model, Klara and her fellow AFs at The Friend Store are largely ignored in favour of newer B-3 models. Klara is selected to stand in the store window and sees two people outside surrounded by a glowing light, which she perceives to be love. After she interacts with a girl named Josie against store policy, Josie's mother Chrissie buys Klara to be Josie's companion.

Josie, who is 'lifted' (a form of intelligence-enhancing gene therapy), lives a lonely existence in a lavish rural home near a wheat farm. Klara and Josie become friends, and Klara shares her belief that the Sun is a deity that can grant desires. Chrissie and the family's housekeeper Melania are less welcoming, annoyed by Klara's ignorance about the world. Josie visits her friend Rick with Klara and collapses, revealing she has a chronic illness. Klara prays to the sun to heal Josie, and to destroy a harvester on the farm, which spews smoke that blocks the sun. Klara encounters a fellow android in the wheatfield working as a scarecrow. She frees him from a barbed wire fence and they become friends. Josie and Rick convince Klara to use her ability to mimic speech to steal Melania's car. Klara loses consciousness before telling the car the desired destination, causing it to speed out of control. Josie has a seizure and the car crashes.

When Chrissie attempts to return Klara she finds The Friend Store out of business. They attempt to abandon Klara at Morgan's Falls, but attempts to drown her fail because Klara has no lungs. Chrissie reveals Josie's condition is terminal, a complication from her lifting treatment. Klara imitates Josie having a conversation with Chrissie, who finds it therapeutic and takes Klara home.

Klara is chased by the harvester in the wheatfield and shocked unconscious by an electric fence. Rick revives her and takes her to the barn Klara believes the sun 'lives' due to it setting there each night. She prays again to the sun to heal Josie. Klara and Rick encounter the scarecrow on the way home, destroyed by the harvester. Rick sets fire to the remains after Klara relays his wish to not let his body be melted down for parts.

Chrissie throws an 'interaction party' for Josie with other lifted children, who bully Josie and Rick. They callously throw AFs across the room for fun, and Klara retaliates by throwing a boy through a wall. The stress exacerbates Josie's illness. Melania asks Klara to investigate the 'portrait of Josie' for which Chrissie and Josie make frequent trips into the city. Klara meets with Capaldi, a man whose 'portrait' of Josie is actually an android replica for Chrissie. Josie storms out, furious at her mother, while Capaldi explains they plan to put Klara's innards into the Josie replica and have her 'act' as Josie after her death.

Klara finds the harvester stored in the barn, and concludes it is the reason her appeals to the sun have not been granted. To destroy the harvester, she stabs herself in the neck with a screwdriver so flammable fluid can set the barn on fire. Josie and Chrissie's reconciliation is interrupted when they notice the burning barn. Rick saves Klara by stopping her 'blood' loss. Klara sees light surrounding Josie and Chrissie and realizes they have made up.

Klara narrates that after the incident, her memory and executive functioning capacities were seriously diminished due to the lost fluid. Josie recovers, which Klara attributes to the sun's help; she stays with Chrissie and Josie until Josie leaves home, then moves to a 'robot retirement' community, a trailer park where she reunites with the Friend Store manager and her old AF colleagues. Josie visits, and the two hold hands, glowing with light.

== Cast ==
- Jenna Ortega as Klara
- Amy Adams as Chrissie, Josie's mother
- Mia Tharia as Josie
- Aran Murphy as Rick, Josie's best friend and love interest
- Natasha Lyonne as Store Manager
- Steve Buscemi as Capaldi, a benefactor
- Rachel House as Melania, Chrissie's housekeeper
- Harry Greenwood as Rex
- Jessie Griffin as the scarecrow android who befriends Klara
- Sophia Bryant-Taukiri as Sal, Josie's older sister

Simon Baker was cast as Josie's father Paul, but his scenes were cut from the film. Director Taika Waititi and his wife Rita Ora had scenes in the film, but the former decided to cut them.

== Production ==
=== Development ===
In July 2020, Sony's 3000 Pictures acquired the screen rights to Kazuo Ishiguro's novel Klara and the Sun, with David Heyman attached to produce for his company Heyday Films. On March 12, 2021, Dahvi Waller was set to write the script, with Ishiguro set to serve as an executive producer. In May 2023, Taika Waititi entered negotiations to direct and produce the film.

In January 2024, when Waititi was confirmed to direct the film, Jenna Ortega was reported to be in talks to star in the lead role. The next month, Amy Adams, Mia Tharia, Aran Murphy, Natasha Lyonne and Simon Baker joined the cast, while Ortega was confirmed to star as Klara. In August 2024, it was revealed that Steve Buscemi was a part of the cast.

=== Filming ===
Principal photography began in January 2024 under the working title Tears and Rain, with scenes being shot at Silverlight Studios in Wānaka. Production occurred in Auckland in early April. Adam Gough and Tom Eagles edited the film. The studio reported the film cost $20 million to produce, though financial forms show the actual cost reached $44.3 million.

=== Music ===
In June 2026, it was announced that Michael Giacchino would provide the film's score, marking his fourth collaboration with director Waititi after Jojo Rabbit (2019), Thor: Love and Thunder (2022), and Next Goal Wins (2023).

== Release ==
Klara and the Sun premiered at the 70th BFI London Film Festival on October 15, 2026. It was also presented in the Grand public section of the 21st Rome Film Festival in October 2026. It was released in the United States and the UK by Sony Pictures Releasing, through its Columbia Pictures label on October 23, 2026.

In response to the film's negative reception, Klara and the Sun was removed from over 2,000 theaters in the United States. The film's planned theatrical release in Spain was also cancelled.

== Reception ==
=== Box office ===
As of November 16, 2026, Klara and the Sun grossed $1.3 million in the United States and Canada, and $1.8 million in other territories, for a worldwide total of $3.1 million.

In the United States and Canada, Klara and the Sun was released alongside Clayface, Wildwood, Wicker, and Ali G: Who Iz I?, and was projected to gross around $2 million from 850 theaters in its opening weekend. The film was initially slated for a wide 2,000+ theater release, but was scaled back following poor early critical reception. The film's debut weekend was reported as $701,059 domestic with $1,369,660 worldwide. Despite reports of Sony halting reporting prior to the second weekend, both The Numbers and Box Office Mojo reported its second weekend domestic take at $157,555 (a 78% drop), with a worldwide gross by November 10, 2026, of $2,964,994.

=== Critical response ===
Reaction to Klara and the Sun among critics following its premiere showing was largely negative. On the review aggregator website Rotten Tomatoes, 26% of 97 critics' reviews are positive, with an average rating of 4.6/10. The website's consensus reads: "Flattening the nuanced ideas of its acclaimed source material with a tonally broad approach, Klara and the Sun aims to be endearing and inspiring but winds up being cloying and twee." Metacritic, which uses a weighted average, assigned the film a score of 31 out of 100, based on 28 critics, indicating "generally unfavorable" reviews. 69% of audiences polled by PostTrak gave the film a positive score, with 48% saying they would definitely recommend it.

Peter Bradshaw of The Guardian gave the film 1 star out of 5, describing it as a "sentimental mess". David Jenkins of Little White Lies described the film as having a "juvenile habit of undercutting any hint at profundity with a jolt of silly humour or a comic rug pull". David Rooney of The Hollywood Reporter panned the direction and screenplay, stating: "it keeps straining for poignancy while trampling on any hint of genuine emotion with forced humor that rarely prompts even a smile ... Not only does Waititi's film have nothing to say about the evolving relationship between humans and AI, it fails even in the more pedestrian territory of friendship, love, grief and that tired old thematic staple of reminding us to cherish every moment while we can. The movie is fatally twee... It misses that mark and just about any other that might be considered entertaining."

Upset by the poor reviews on the film, Waititi admonished on social media "those sad lost souls who couldn't achieve their dreams of becoming artists, and thus became critics. The same people who also hated Jojo Rabbit. Irrelevant. Out of touch. Obsolete. In the bin."
