= Youth (TV series) =

2026 British comedy series

- Genre: Romantic comedy; Comedy drama; Sex comedy
- Created by: Sharon Horgan
- Starring: Sharon Horgan; Rupert Friend; Sharlene Whyte; Aran Murphy; Robbie Gee
- Composer: Jeff Cardoni
- Country of origin: United Kingdom
- Original language: English
- No. of series: 1
- No. of episodes: 8

Production
- Executive producers: Sharon Horgan; Faye Dorn; Jim Kleverweis; Dawn Shadforth
- Cinematography: Korsshan Schlauer; Sam Goldie
- Editors: Derek Holland; Billy Sneddon; Gareth Heal; Colin Fair
- Running time: 27–29 minutes
- Production company: Merman

Original release
- Network: HBO (United States); HBO Max (United Kingdom)
- Release: 20 September 2026 – present

Youth is a British romantic comedy television series created by and starring Sharon Horgan. The first series premiered on HBO in the United States and HBO Max in the United Kingdom on 20 September 2026 and received widespread reviews. In November 2026, Youth was renewed for a second series.

== Premise ==
The show follows Alex, Horgan's character, a divorcee in her 50s juggling a career, aging parents and a teenage son.

== Cast and characters ==
=== Main ===
- Sharon Horgan as Alex, a literary agent who is re-evaluating her life choices as she nears sixty
- Rupert Friend as Patrick, Alex's love interest whom she nicknames "Ex-Pat"
- Sharlene Whyte as Sam, Alex's boss and best friend
- Aran Murphy as Ruairí Flynn, Alex's troubled son
- Robbie Gee as Frank, Sam's husband who works as a bartender

=== Recurring ===
- Anne Reid as Charlotte, a nonagenarian author and one of Alex and Sam's clients
- Harriet Walter as Livonia, Charlotte's no-nonsense daughter
- Libby Mai as Plum, Alex's assistant and Ruairi's love interest.
- Douglas Hodge as Malcolm, an author who has a grudge against Alex for dropping him as a client
- David Hargreaves as Wally, Alex's father
- Owen McDonnell as Lorcan, an actor, Alex's ex-husband, and Ruari's father
- Roisin Gallagher as Meredith

=== Guest ===
- Freddie Fox as Grayson, a rival literary agent
- Bríd Brennan as Maggie, Alex's mother
- Nadia Parkes as Cara, a friend of Patrick's and later his girlfriend
- Karla Crome as Theresa, Lorcan's younger girlfriend
- Tim McInnerny as Michael, Frank's friend whom he tries to set-up with Alex

=== Cameo ===
- Damian Lewis as himself (ep. 1)
- James Norton as himself (ep. 8)

== Episodes ==
No.	Title	Directed by	Written by	Original release date
1	"Lockjaw"	Dawn Shadforth	Sharon Horgan	20 September 2026
Reflecting on her life, Alex, a literary agent in her mid-fifties, resolves to enjoy herself before she reaches sixty. During an important meeting with potential client Damian Lewis and her boss Sam, Alex's jaw locks up and the doctor tells her it was caused by arthritis, further fuelling Alex's anxieties and leading her to reconnect with former fling Patrick and agree to an ultimately unsuccessful date with Michael, an older friend of Sam's husband Frank. At the high school graduation of Alex's son Ruari, she is shocked when he ruins the event by delivering a political speech and appears to have tension with his classmates, not helped by his father and Alex's ex-husband Lorcan announcing that he is relocating to Canada to star in a sci-fi tv show. Alex later becomes emotional as Ruari leaves home to attend the University of Kent. A few days later, while Alex and Patrick are having sex, Ruari unexpectedly returns home upset but refuses to explain what has happened.
2	"Wagon Burner"	Dawn Shadforth	Sharon Horgan	20 September 2026
Ruari tells Alex he is dropping out of University, but she convinces him to return to Kent with her. When they arrive at his accommodation, all of Ruari's belongings have been thrown into bin bags and removed from his room, and his housemates avoid speaking to her. One of the students calls Ruari a "pervert" and Alex takes him home, where he falls into a depression and rarely leaves his bed. Alex and Sam attempt to provide feedback to veteran author Charlotte, whose latest novel Wagon Burner is overly-sexual, but are confronted by her daughter Livia, who questions whether they are doing enough for her mother's career and threatens to look for an alternative agency. Alex also feels underappreciated by Sam, who dismisses her request to nurture an underdeveloped author on her client list. When he finds out that she calls him "Ex-Pat", Patrick expresses to Alex that he never really considered himself her ex because they never formally defined what they were. Alex responds that casual companionship is no longer enough for her and says she wants a proper relationship, and Patrick tells her that he wants the same thing, though they later argue when Patrick advises that he doesn't want to add pressure to her life, which Alex interprets as a criticism of how she is managing her responsibilities.
3	"Welcome to the Rat's Nest"	Dawn Shadforth	Sharon Horgan	27 September 2026
Alex and Sam attend the Frankfurt Book Fair to try and sell Wagon Burner, drawing ire from some of the publishers. Unsure of what to do with him, Alex is forced to bring Ruari along, and encourages him to attend a local open day, but he decides to go drinking instead. As her communication with Patrick becomes stunted, Alex reconnects with a Lars, a former flame, and struggles with bleeding despite having not had a period for over a year. She also becomes increasingly frustrated by the popularity of Goblin Seed, a self-published novel by Alex's creepy former client Malcolm, and is incensed when Sam suggests they take him back on as a client. Ruari admits to feeling overwhelmed by life and admits that he and a girl from university got into bed and blacked out, with neither of them being able to remember what happened. He states that his ex-girlfriend Mia spread around a rumour that he was a pervert as revenge because he was unable to become aroused when they were together. Alex comforts him and reassures him that they will figure things out.
4	"Michael Man"	Dawn Shadforth	Ailbhe Keogan	4 October 2026
Frustrated by her lack of options and by seeing Patrick with another woman, Alex is convinced by Sam to give Michael another chance. Alex embarrasses herself at work by venting to a psychology columnist about her own love life during a meeting which causes several arguments with Sam. She is also forced to attend a Goblin Seed event to try and woo Malcolm but continues to be unsettled by his behaviour. After getting advice from Michael, Alex tells Sam she feels underappreciated and wants to be a partner in the business, which Sam rejects. Ruari begins working for Frank as a bartender but remains distant from Alex and tries to connect with Michael after being unable to get in touch with Lorcan. He tells Michael he is attempting semen retention after seeing videos online, but is struggling with pain and increased anger. Ruari then gets into a fight at work with some former classmates and is punched in the face, leading him to expresses his struggles with being a young man to Alex. While she enjoys his companionship and advice around raising Ruari, Alex is not sexually interested in Michael, who breaks up with her as a result.
5	"The Holiday"	Jim O'Hanlon	Jack Rooke	11 October 2026
Alex and Ruari travel to Ibiza to celebrate Sam and Frank's tenth wedding anniversary, but Alex is irked by the presence of Lorcan, Patrick, and their girlfriends Theresa and Cara. After expressing her guilt for using him as a plus one on a couple's holiday, Ruari encourages Alex to try and enjoy herself. He is then dragged on a night out with the men, where he rebuffs Lorcan's attempts to connect and confesses to Patrick that he is worried about turning into his father. The night descends into chaos when Theresa gets extremely drunk, Cara leaves to go clubbing, Sam and Frank argue, and Ruari is given MDMA by a local girl, leaving him on a comedown for the remainder of the trip. Lorcan criticizes Alex's parenting and blames her for Ruari being overly-sensitive. Frank is stung by a jellyfish and suffers a heart attack, but is rescued by Patrick and taken to hospital. Patrick then tells Alex that he is reassessing their relationship and wishes he had tried harder to make things work between them.
6	"Desperate Measures"	Jim O'Hanlon	Sharon Horgan and Lena Headey	18 October 2026
After Ibiza, Alex and Patrick resume their relationship. Alex asks Patrick indirectly if they’re exclusive, but he avoids answering and mentions he isn’t planning dates, leaving her confused. The next day, they learn Malcolm’s lunch was a ruse; he met another agency first and leaves Sam and Alex with the bill. Later, after getting drunk, Alex accepts a date from Lars, who happens to be in London, and takes a Xanax from Frank. She blacks out, goes to a bar where Patrick is with friends, and Lars follows—leading to a fall-out with Patrick. The next day, during a client meeting, Alex’s dad calls, struggling to turn off his IRA podcasts. She frantically phones Patrick for help. When she gets home after arguing with Sam over pursuing Yaffah (an author Sam told her to drop), she finds Patrick and her dad playing video games. They affirm their commitment to “whatever this is” as the IRA podcasts start playing again.
7	"Last Night on Earth"	Jim O'Hanlon	Sarah Simmonds	25 October 2026
8	"Agent of the Year"	Jim O'Hanlon	Sharon Horgan	1 November 2026

== Production ==
The series is from Sharon Horgan, who stars and serves as creator, writer and executive producer via her production company Merman. It was greenlit by HBO in February 2025. Additional executive producers are Faye Dorn via Merman, Jim Kleverweis, and Dawn Shadforth, who also served as director.

In January 2026, Rupert Friend was cast opposite Horgan. In March 2026, Sharlene Whyte, Aran Murphy and Robbie Gee joined the main cast, while the series was titled as Youth. Later that month, Harriet Walter, Anne Reid, Freddie Fox were cast in recurring roles.

On November 2, 2026, HBO renewed the series for a second series.

== Release ==
The first two episodes premiered on HBO in the United States and on HBO Max in the United Kingdom on 20 September 2026.

== Reception ==
On the review aggregator website Rotten Tomatoes, 94% of 34 critics' reviews are positive, with an average rating of 8.1/10. The website's critics consensus reads, "Youth brazenly sheds a comedic light on the plight of aging through Sharon Horgan's signature style of impeccable wit, hilarious relatability, and conscious empathy." Metacritic, which uses a weighted average, assigned the film a score of 82 out of 100, based on 14 critics, indicating "universal acclaim".
