= Yvonne McGuinness =

Irish artist (born 1972)

- Born: 12 October 1972 (age 54); Dublin, Ireland
- Occupation: Visual artist
- Spouse: Cillian Murphy (m. 2004)
- Children: 2, including Aran
- Relatives: John McGuinness (uncle)
- Website: yvonnemcguinness.com

Yvonne McGuinness (born 12 October 1972) is an Irish visual artist who has made films, performances, installation art and sound works. She is known for immersive and site-specific art projects, and her works often explore the interaction between the space and the audience.

McGuinness was born in Kilkenny in Ireland, and is now based in Monkstown, Dublin. She holds a master's degree from the Royal College of Art in London. Her works, including use of media such as video installations and prints, have been exhibited in Ireland. A 2004 biography stated, "Recent works have been preoccupied with notions of portrayal of the self and with deception, dealing with the sublimated desire for self-expression of the artist and the tension between revelation and concealment."

She has made the short films This is Between Us (2011), Charlie's Place (2012), Procession (2012), You Can't Feel What You Feel (2017), and Holding Ground Where the Wood Lands (2018).

== Early life and education ==
Yvonne McGuinness was born on 12 October 1972 in Kilkenny. Her father was a businessman, and her uncle John McGuinness is a well-known Fianna Fáil politician. She attended Crawford College of Art and Design in Cork as an undergraduate, and got an MA from the Royal College of Art (RCA) in London. While at the RCA, she developed her artistic approach and tried out a variety of media including film, performance art, sculpture, textile work. In addition, she began to explore site specific installations where the interaction between space, identity and time became a persistent theme with her work. After graduation, she lost confidence and stopped making art for a long while until returning to Ireland in 2015.

== Career ==
McGuinness's works have included sculpture, textile work, and public interventions, film and performance art. She is known especially for work around space, time and community, using immersive methods to engage.

Her works are frequently site-responsive and temporary works considering the theme of belonging and identity. Her projects often reinterpret public spaces, intending to compel audiences to view their surroundings in a new fashion. Her everyday experience-based installations often relabel everyday experience to build surreal moments where time and space appear different.

Her installation "The Central Field" (2008), a collaboration with artist Rhona Byrne, combined sound, movement, and visual elements to create what art critic Declan Long described as "a temporally complex experience that resists easy categorization" (Byrne and McGuinness).

McGuinness has made short films, video installations, and public interventions. She works with multimedia platforms through her practice to produce experiential narratives that grow visual presentation possibilities.

Cassland (London) was one of her early showcases where she contributed part of View from the Sitting Room (2004), was an instance of the complicated relation between private and public spaces an exhibition in which she showed an interactive installation blurring the distinction between public and private spaces. She invited audiences to interact with her work in unconventional ways as a way of re-evaluating spatial linkage and personal buffer.

== Personal life ==
McGuinness met actor Cillian Murphy in the late 1990s and they married in 2004. They have two sons; the youngest is actor Aran Murphy. McGuinness keeps her private life secluded from public attention. During the acceptance speech at the 2024 Academy Awards, Cillian Murphy expressed his appreciation for McGuinness.

McGuinness emphasized artistic independence to Art Monthly in a 2024 interview when she stated, "My work operates within its own framework to investigate spatial constructs together with community projects across multiple platforms".

== Selected filmography ==
- This is Between Us (2011) – A film exploring intimacy and the complexities of personal relationships through a blend of scripted and unscripted moments.
- Charlie's Place (2012) – A film that examines notions of belonging and displacement, using fragmented storytelling techniques.
- Procession (2012) – A project that combines movement, sound, and visual abstraction to create an evocative exploration of time and memory.
