= Aran Murphy =

Irish actor (born 2007)

- Born: 12 July 2007 (age 19); London, United Kingdom
- Occupation: Actor
- Years active: 2022–present
- Parents: Cillian Murphy (father); Yvonne McGuinness (mother)

Aran Murphy (born 12 July 2007) is an Irish stage, film and television actor. His television credits include the comedy drama series Youth (2026) and the drama series War (2026).

== Early life ==
Born in 2007, Murphy was raised in London, the son of fellow Irish actor Cillian Murphy and Irish visual artist Yvonne McGuinness. He has an older brother, Malachy. His family relocated to Monkstown, Dublin in 2015 and he completed his Leaving Certificate in Ireland in 2025.

== Career ==
At the age of 11, Murphy played the title role in a stage adaptation of Hamnet by the Irish theatre company Dead Centre. He performed in Dublin, London, New York, Brisbane and Hong Kong.

Murphy had an early screen role in "found footage" independent film LOLA (2022). In 2025, he was cast in HBO legal drama series War, as the son of divorcing parents played by Dominic West and Sienna Miller. In September 2026, he had his first leading role as Ruarí in the Sharon Horgan comedy drama series Youth.

Murphy has a role in the film adaptation of Kazuo Ishiguro's novel Klara and the Sun (2026) from Taika Waititi, appearing alongside Jenna Ortega and Amy Adams.

== Filmography ==
Key
†	Denotes works that have not yet been released

Year	Title	Role	Notes
2022	LOLA	Leo	
2026	Youth	Ruarí	Lead role
2026	War	Gabriel	
2026	Klara and the Sun	Rick	
