= Manchester by the Sea =

Manchester by the Sea may refer to:

- Manchester-by-the-Sea, Massachusetts, a town on Cape Ann, in Essex County, Massachusetts
- Manchester by the Sea (film), a 2016 American drama film
