= Cillian Murphy =

Irish actor (born 1976)

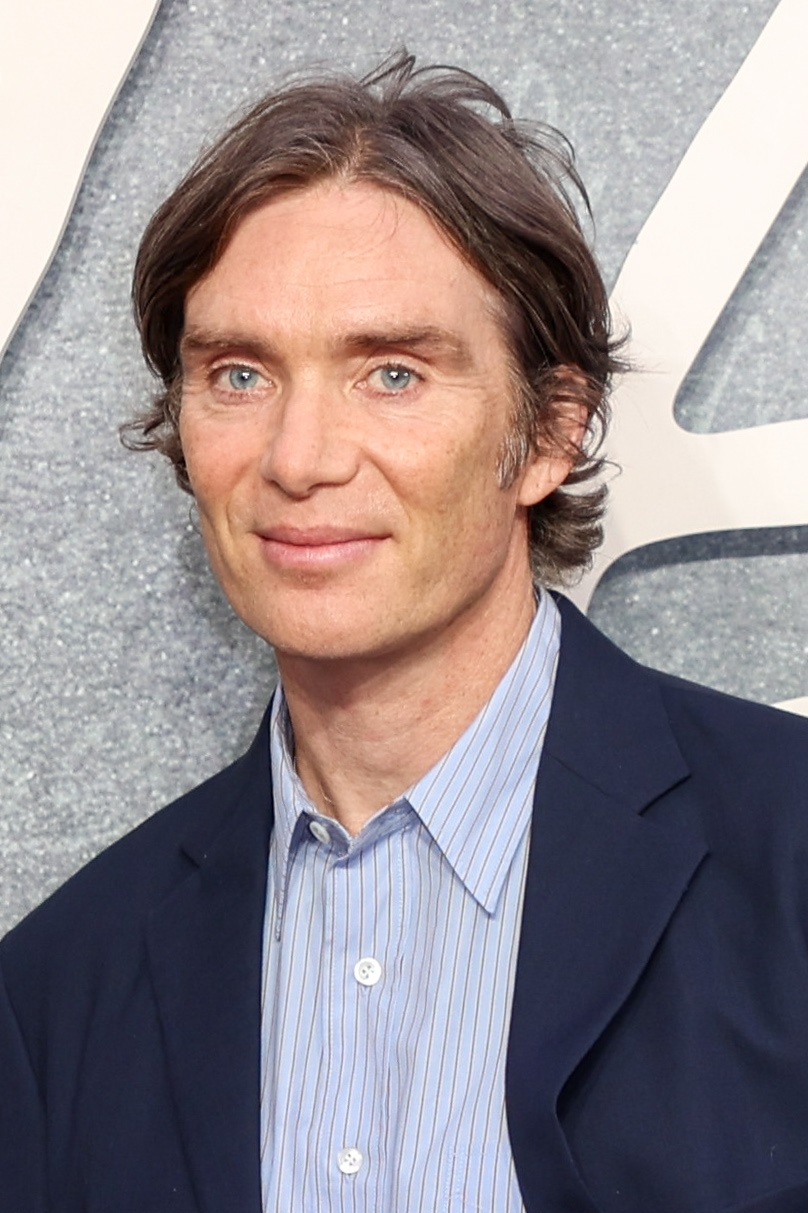
- Murphy in 2025
- Born: 25 May 1976 (age 50); Douglas, Cork, Ireland
- Occupations: Actor; producer
- Years active: 1996–present
- Works: Full list
- Spouse: Yvonne McGuinness (m. 2004)
- Children: 2, including Aran
- Awards: Full list

Cillian Murphy (/ˈkɪliən/ KILL-ee-ən; born 25 May 1976) is an Irish actor and film producer. His works encompass both stage and screen, and his accolades include an Academy Award, a BAFTA Award, and a Golden Globe Award.

He made his professional debut in Enda Walsh's 1996 play Disco Pigs, a role he later reprised in the 2001 screen adaptation. His early film credits include the horror film 28 Days Later (2002), the dark comedy Intermission (2003), the thriller Red Eye (2005), the Irish war drama The Wind That Shakes the Barley (2006), and the science fiction thriller Sunshine (2007). He played a transgender Irish woman in the comedy-drama Breakfast on Pluto (2005), which earned him his first Golden Globe Award nomination.

Murphy is known for his collaborations with filmmaker Christopher Nolan. He appeared in Nolan's The Dark Knight trilogy (2005–2012), Inception (2010) and Dunkirk (2017), before receiving the Academy Award for Best Actor for his portrayal of J. Robert Oppenheimer in Oppenheimer (2023). He gained further recognition for his role as Tommy Shelby in the BBC period drama series Peaky Blinders (2013–2022) and its continuation film Peaky Blinders: The Immortal Man (2026).

== Early life and education ==
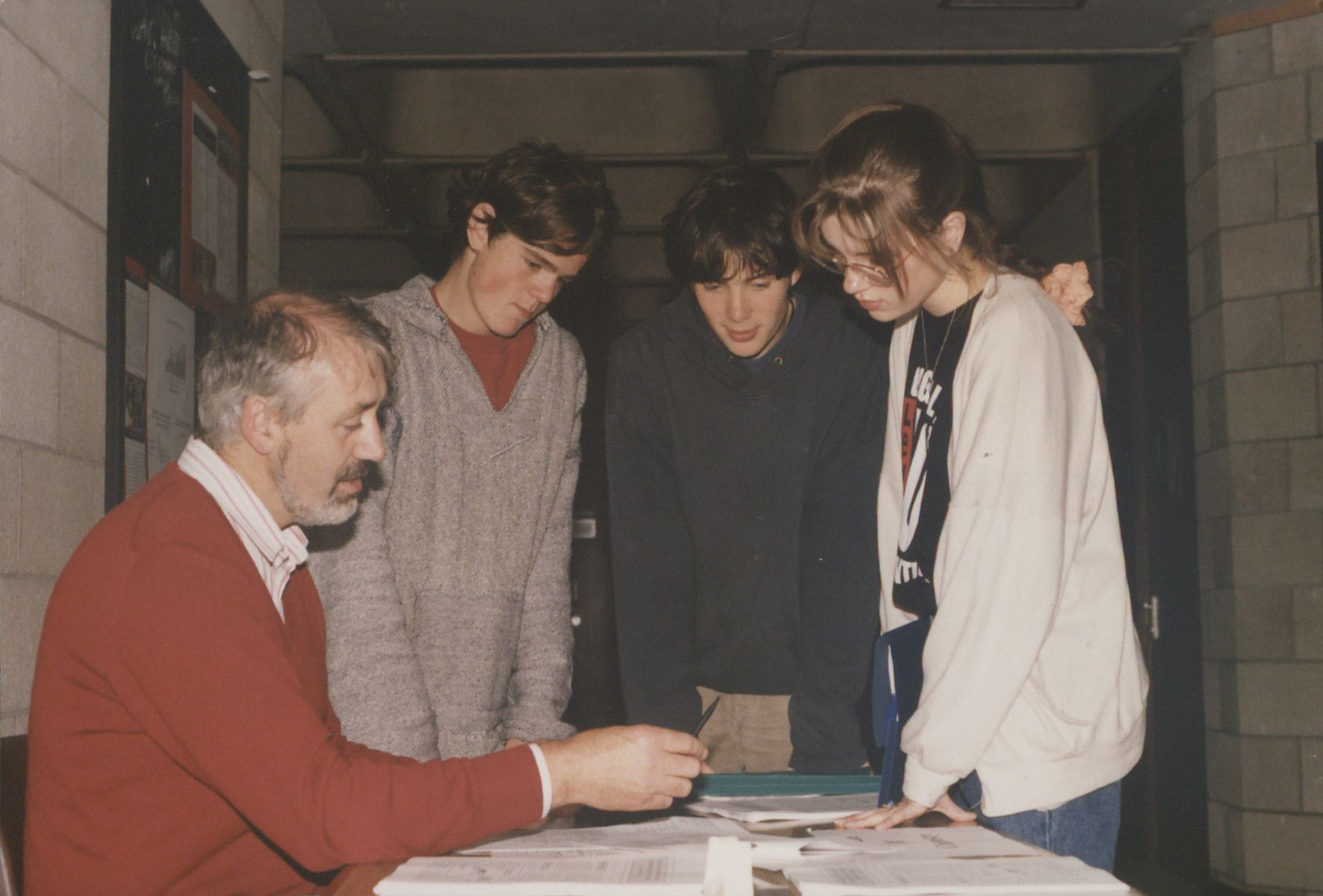
Murphy (second from right) with Tim Smyth, Eoin O'Sullivan and Maria-Theresa Grandfield in 1992

Murphy was born on 25 May 1976 in Douglas, Cork. His mother taught French while his father, Brendan, worked for the Department of Education. His grandfather, aunts, and uncles were also teachers. He was raised in Ballintemple, Cork, alongside his younger brother Páidi and younger sisters Sile and Orla. He started writing and performing songs at the age of 10.

Murphy was raised Catholic and attended the fee-paying Catholic secondary school Presentation Brothers College, where he did well academically but often got into trouble, sometimes being suspended; he decided in his fourth year that misbehaving was not worth the hassle. Not keen on sports, which was a major part of the school's curriculum, he found that artistic pursuits were neglected at the school.

Murphy got his first taste of performing in secondary school when he participated in a drama module presented by Corcadorca Theatre Company director Pat Kiernan. He later described the experience as a "huge high" and a "fully alive" feeling that he then set out to chase. Novelist William Wall, who was his English teacher, encouraged him to pursue acting but he was set on becoming a rock star. In his late teens and early 20s, he sang and played the guitar in several bands alongside his brother, Páidi, and the Beatles-obsessed duo named their most successful band The Sons of Mr. Green Genes, which they adopted from the Frank Zappa song of the same name. He later said the band "specialised in wacky lyrics and endless guitar solos". They were offered a five-album deal by Acid Jazz Records, which they rejected because Páidi was still in school and the duo did not agree with the small amount of money they would get for giving the record label the rights to Murphy's compositions. Murphy later confessed, "I'm very glad in retrospect that we didn't sign because you kind of sign away your life to a label and the whole of your music."

Murphy began studying law at University College Cork (UCC) in 1996 but failed his first-year exams because he "had no ambitions to do it". Not only was he busy with his band, but he knew within days after starting at UCC that he did not want to practise law. After seeing Corcadorca's stage production of A Clockwork Orange, directed by Kiernan, he began directing his attention to acting. His first major role was in the UCC Drama Society's amateur production of Observe the Sons of Ulster Marching Towards the Somme, which starred Irish-American comedian Des Bishop. Murphy also played the lead in their production of Little Shop of Horrors, which was performed in the Cork Opera House. He later admitted that his primary motivation at the time was not to pursue an acting career, but to go to parties and meet women.

== Career ==
=== 1996–2002: Theatre work breakthrough and early roles ===
Murphy pressured Pat Kiernan until he got an audition at Corcadorca Theatre Company, and in September 1996, he made his professional acting debut on the stage, playing the part of a volatile Cork teenager in Enda Walsh's Disco Pigs. Walsh recalled meeting and discovering Murphy: "There was something about him – he was incredibly enigmatic and he would walk into a room with real presence and you'd go, "My God". It had nothing to do with those bloody eyes that everyone's going on about all the time." Murphy observed, "I was unbelievably cocky and had nothing to lose, and it suited the part, I suppose". Originally intended to run for three weeks in Cork, Disco Pigs ended up touring throughout Europe, Canada and Australia for two years, and Murphy left both university and his band. Though he had intended to go back to playing music, he secured representation after his first agent caught a performance of Disco Pigs, and his acting career began to take off. In 2023, Murphy went on to call this moment in time pivotal: "It all happened to me in one month, in August '96: (my band) got offered a record deal, I failed my law exams, I got the part in Disco Pigs, and I met my wife. I now look back and go, 'Oh, shit, I didn't know then how important all these things were' - the sort of domino effect that they would have on my life ... I love the chaos and the randomness. I love the beauty of the unexpected."

He proceeded to star in many other theatre productions, including Shakespeare's Much Ado About Nothing (1998), The Country Boy, and Juno and the Paycock (both 1999). At the turn of the 21st century, he began appearing in independent films such as On the Edge (2001), and in short films, including Filleann an Feall (2000) and Watchmen (2001). He also reprised his role for the film adaption of Disco Pigs (2001) and appeared in the BBC television mini-series adaptation of The Way We Live Now. During this period, he moved from Cork, relocating first to Dublin for a few years, then to London in 2001. In 2002, Murphy starred as Adam in a theatre production of Neil LaBute's The Shape of Things at the Gate Theatre in Dublin. Writing for The Irish Times, Fintan O'Toole praised Murphy's performance, "Murphy measures out his metamorphosis with an impressive subtlety and intelligence".

=== 2002–2004: 28 Days Later and breakthrough ===
Murphy was cast in the lead role in Danny Boyle's horror film 28 Days Later (2002). He portrayed pandemic survivor Jim, who is "perplexed to find himself alone in the desolate, post-apocalyptic world" after waking from a coma in a London hospital. Casting director Gail Stevens suggested that Boyle audition Murphy for the role, having been impressed with his performance in Disco Pigs. Stevens stated that it was only after seeing his slender physique during filming that they decided to feature him fully nude at the beginning of the film. She recalled that Murphy was shy on set with the tendency to look slightly away from the camera, but enthused that he had a "dreamy, slightly de-energised, floating quality that is fantastic for the film". Released in the UK in late 2002, by the following July, 28 Days Later had become a sleeper hit in North America, and success worldwide, putting Murphy in front of a mass audience for the first time. His performance earned him a nomination for Best Newcomer at the 8th Empire Awards, and Breakthrough Male Performance at the 2004 MTV Movie Awards. Murphy professed that he considered the film to be much deeper than a zombie or horror film, expressing surprise at the film's success, and that American audiences responded well to its content and violence. Murphy said, "The film did so well. And you watch zombie stuff [now], we were the first people to make zombies run, and [that] changed everything. It has a very special place in my heart, that movie."

In 2003, Murphy played the role of Konstantine in a stage production of Chekhov's The Seagull at the Edinburgh International Festival. He said that he wanted to play Konstantine because the character "goes on this amazing journey through the play [...] he comes to realise there's no point being an iconoclastic writer just for the sake of it, and that the search for new forms has to have something behind it".

Murphy starred as a lovelorn, hapless supermarket stocker who plots a bank heist with Colin Farrell in Intermission (2003), which became the highest-grossing Irish independent film in Irish box office history (until The Wind That Shakes the Barley broke the record in 2006). Reflecting on his roles in 28 Days Later and the "sad-sack Dublin shelf-stacker" in Intermission, Sarah Lyall of the International Herald Tribune stated that Murphy brought "fluent ease to the roles he takes on, a graceful and wholly believable intensity. His delicate good looks have, as much as his acting prowess, caused people to mark him as Ireland's next Colin Farrell, albeit one who seems less likely to be caught tomcatting around or brawling drunkenly at premieres." He had a minor supporting role in the successful Hollywood period drama Cold Mountain (2003). He portrayed a deserting soldier who shares a grim scene with Jude Law's character, and was on location in Romania for only a week. Murphy stated that it was a "massive production", remarking that director Anthony Minghella was the calmest director he had ever met. Murphy also had a role as a butcher in Girl with a Pearl Earring (2003) with Scarlett Johansson and Colin Firth.

In 2004, Murphy toured Ireland with the Druid Theatre Company, in The Playboy of the Western World (playing the character of Christy Mahon) under the direction of Garry Hynes—who had previously directed Murphy back in 1999 in the theatre productions of Juno and the Paycock—and also in The Country Boy.

=== 2005–2006: Villainous roles and critical success ===
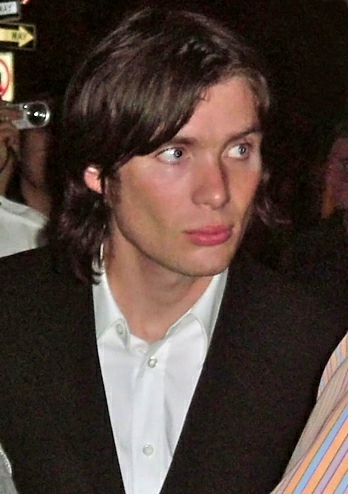
Murphy at the 2005 New York Film Festival

Murphy appeared as Dr. Jonathan Crane in Christopher Nolan's Batman Begins (2005). Originally asked to audition for the role of Bruce Wayne / Batman, Murphy never saw himself as having the right physique for the superhero, but leapt at the chance to connect with director Nolan. Though the lead went to Christian Bale, Nolan was so impressed with Murphy that he gave him the supporting role of Dr. Jonathan Crane, whose alter ego is supervillain Scarecrow. Nolan told Spin magazine, "He has the most extraordinary eyes, and I kept trying to invent excuses for him to take his glasses off in close-ups". He starred as Jackson Rippner, who terrorises Rachel McAdams on an overnight flight in Wes Craven's thriller, Red Eye (2005). The New York Times film critic Manohla Dargis asserted that Murphy made "a picture-perfect villain" and that his "baby blues look cold enough to freeze water and his wolfish leer suggests its own terrors". The film was favourably reviewed and earned almost $100 million worldwide.

Murphy received several awards nominations for his 2005 villainous roles, among them a nomination as Best Villain at the 2006 MTV Movie Awards for Batman Begins. Entertainment Weekly ranked him among its 2005 "Summer MVPs", a cover story list of 10 entertainers with outstanding breakthrough performances. The New Yorker's David Denby wrote: "Cillian Murphy, who has angelic looks that can turn sinister, is one of the most elegantly seductive monsters in recent movies."

Murphy starred as Patrick/"Kitten" Braden, a transgender Irish woman in search of her mother, in Neil Jordan's comedy-drama Breakfast on Pluto (2005), based on the novel of the same title by Patrick McCabe. Seen against the film's kaleidoscopic backdrop of 1970s glitter rock fashion, magic shows, red-light districts and IRA violence, Murphy transforms from androgynous teen to a blonde drag queen. He had auditioned for the role in 2001 and, though Jordan liked him for the part, the director of The Crying Game was hesitant to revisit transgender and IRA issues. The actor lobbied Jordan for several years in a bid to get the film made before Murphy became too old to play the part; in 2004, he prepared for the role by meeting a transvestite who dressed him and took him clubbing with other transvestites. The role required "serious primping" with eyebrow plucking and chest and leg hair removal, and Roger Ebert noted the way that Murphy played the character with a "bemused and hopeful voice". While lukewarm reviews of Breakfast on Pluto tended to praise Murphy's performance highly, a few critics dissented: The Village Voice, which panned the film, found him "unconvincing" and overly cute. Murphy was nominated for a Golden Globe Award for Best Actor in a Musical or Comedy for Breakfast on Pluto and won the fourth Irish Film and Television Academy Best Actor Award. Premiere magazine cited his performance as Kitten in their "The 24 Finest Performances of 2005" feature.

In 2006, Murphy starred in The Wind That Shakes the Barley, a film about the Irish War of Independence and the Irish Civil War, which won the Palme d'Or at the 2006 Cannes Film Festival and became the most successful Irish independent film at the Irish box office. Murphy was especially keen on appearing in the film due to his intimate connections to Cork, where the film was shot. Murphy auditioned six times for the role of Damien O'Donovan, a young doctor turned revolutionary, before winning the part. Murphy considered it a very special privilege to have been given the role and stated that he was "tremendously proud" of the film, remarking that the "memories run very, very deep – the politics, the divisions and everybody has stories of family members who were caught up in the struggle." David Denby noted Murphy's moments of deep stillness and idiosyncrasies in portraying the character. Kenneth Turan of the Los Angeles Times wrote that "Murphy is especially good at playing the zealotry as well as the soul-searching and the regret, at showing us a man who is eaten up alive because he's forced to act in ways that are contrary to his background and his training". GQ magazine presented Murphy with its 2006 Actor of the Year award for his work in The Wind That Shakes the Barley.

=== 2006–2012: Further theatre and film roles ===
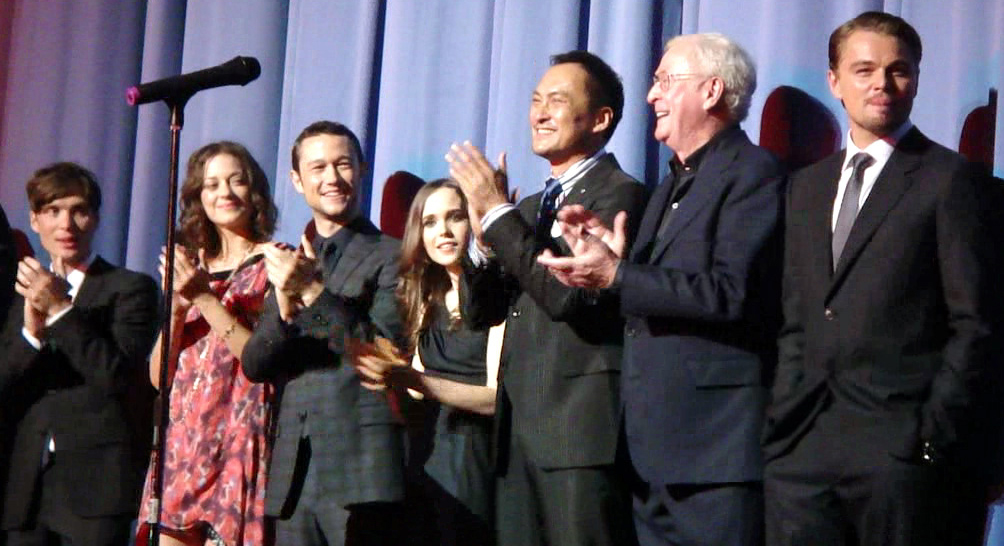
Murphy (far left) with the cast of Inception in 2010

Murphy returned to the stage starring opposite Neve Campbell at the New Ambassadors Theatre in London's West End from November 2006 to February 2007, playing the lead role of John Kolvenbach's play Love Song. Theatre Record described his character of Beane as a "winsomely cranky" mentally unstable "sentimentalised lonely hero", noting how he magnetically, with "all blue eyes and twitching hands", moves "comically from painfully shy "wallpaper" to garrulous, amorous male". Variety magazine considered his performance to be "as magnetic onstage as onscreen", remarking that his "unhurried puzzlement pulls the slight preciousness in the character's idiot-savant naivete back from the brink".

He starred in the science fiction film Sunshine (2007) as a physicist-astronaut charged with re-igniting the sun, also directed by Danny Boyle. He starred opposite Lucy Liu in Paul Soter's romantic comedy Watching the Detectives (2007); the indie film premiered at the 2007 Tribeca Film Festival and was released direct-to-DVD. Murphy starred as Richard Neville, editor of the psychedelic radical underground magazine Oz in the film Hippie Hippie Shake, which was filmed in 2007, but the project, much delayed, was eventually shelved in 2011.

Murphy made a brief re-appearance as the Scarecrow in Nolan's The Dark Knight (2008), the sequel to Batman Begins, before starring in The Edge of Love—about a love quadrangle involving the poet Dylan Thomas—with Keira Knightley, Sienna Miller and Matthew Rhys. In July 2008, Murphy made a debut appearance in another medium—on a postage stamp; the Irish Post Office, An Post, released a series of four stamps paying homage to the creativity of films recently produced in Ireland, including one featuring Murphy in a still from The Wind That Shakes the Barley. In 2009, Murphy starred opposite rock singer Feist and actor David Fox in The Water, directed by Kevin Drew of Broken Social Scene. The 15-minute Canadian short film, released online in April 2009, is nearly silent until the Feist song of the same title plays close to the end. Murphy was attracted to the role as a fan of Broken Social Scene and the prospect of making a silent movie, which he considered to be the "hardest test for any actor". Murphy also starred in Perrier's Bounty, a crime dramedy from the makers of Intermission, in which he portrayed a petty criminal on the run from a gangster played by Brendan Gleeson.

In 2010, he made a return to theatre in From Galway to Broadway and back again, which was a stage show that celebrated the Druid Theatre Company's 35th birthday. The direct-to-video psychological thriller Peacock (2010), co-starring Elliot Page, Susan Sarandon and Bill Pullman, starred Murphy as a man with a split personality who fools people into believing he is also his own wife. Christian Toto of The Washington Times referred to the film as "a handsomely mounted psychological drama with an arresting lead turn by Cillian Murphy", and noted that although Murphy was not a stranger to playing in drag, his work in the film set a "new standard for gender-bending performances". Murphy next starred in Christopher Nolan's Inception (2010), playing entrepreneur Robert Fischer, whose mind is infiltrated by DiCaprio's character Cobb to convince him to dissolve his business. That year, Murphy also made an uncredited cameo as programmer Edward Dillinger Jr., son of original Tron antagonist Ed Dillinger (David Warner) in Tron: Legacy.

In 2011, Murphy performed in the stage monodrama Misterman, written and directed by Enda Walsh, with whom he had previously worked on Disco Pigs. The production was initially staged in Galway and was taken to St. Ann's Warehouse in Brooklyn, New York. Murphy said of the role, "The live nature of it makes it so dangerous. You're only there because of the goodwill of the audience, and that's compounded by its being a one-man show." His performance earned critical acclaim, garnering Irish Times Theatre Award and a Drama Desk Award. Sarah Lyall of the International Herald Tribune described Murphy's character Thomas Magill to be a "complicated mixture of sympathetic and not nice at all – deeply wounded, but with a dangerous, skewed moral code", praising his ability to mimic wickedly. Lyall noted Murphy's "unusual ability to create and inhabit creepy yet fascinating characters from the big screen to the small stage in the intense one-man show Misterman", and documented that on one evening the "theatre was flooded, not with applause but with silence", eventually culminating in a standing ovation at his powerful performance. He played the lead in the British horror film Retreat (2011), which had a limited release. He also appeared in the science fiction film In Time (2011), starring Justin Timberlake and Amanda Seyfried, which was poorly reviewed.

Murphy starred in Red Lights (2012) with Robert De Niro and Sigourney Weaver. He played Tom Buckley, the assistant to Weaver's character who is a paranormal investigator. Murphy considered working with De Niro to have been one of the most intimidating moments in his career. He remarked: "My first scene when I come to visit him my character is supposed to be terrified and intimidated. There was no acting involved. The man has presence. You can't act presence. I'll never have that. Watching him use it... when you put a camera on it, it just becomes something else." The film was panned by critics and under-performed at the box office. Murphy went on to reprise his role as the Scarecrow for the third time in The Dark Knight Rises (2012), and had a supporting role as Mike in the British independent film Broken (2012). His performance earned him a British Independent Film Award for Best Supporting Actor nomination.

=== 2013–present: Peaky Blinders and Oppenheimer ===
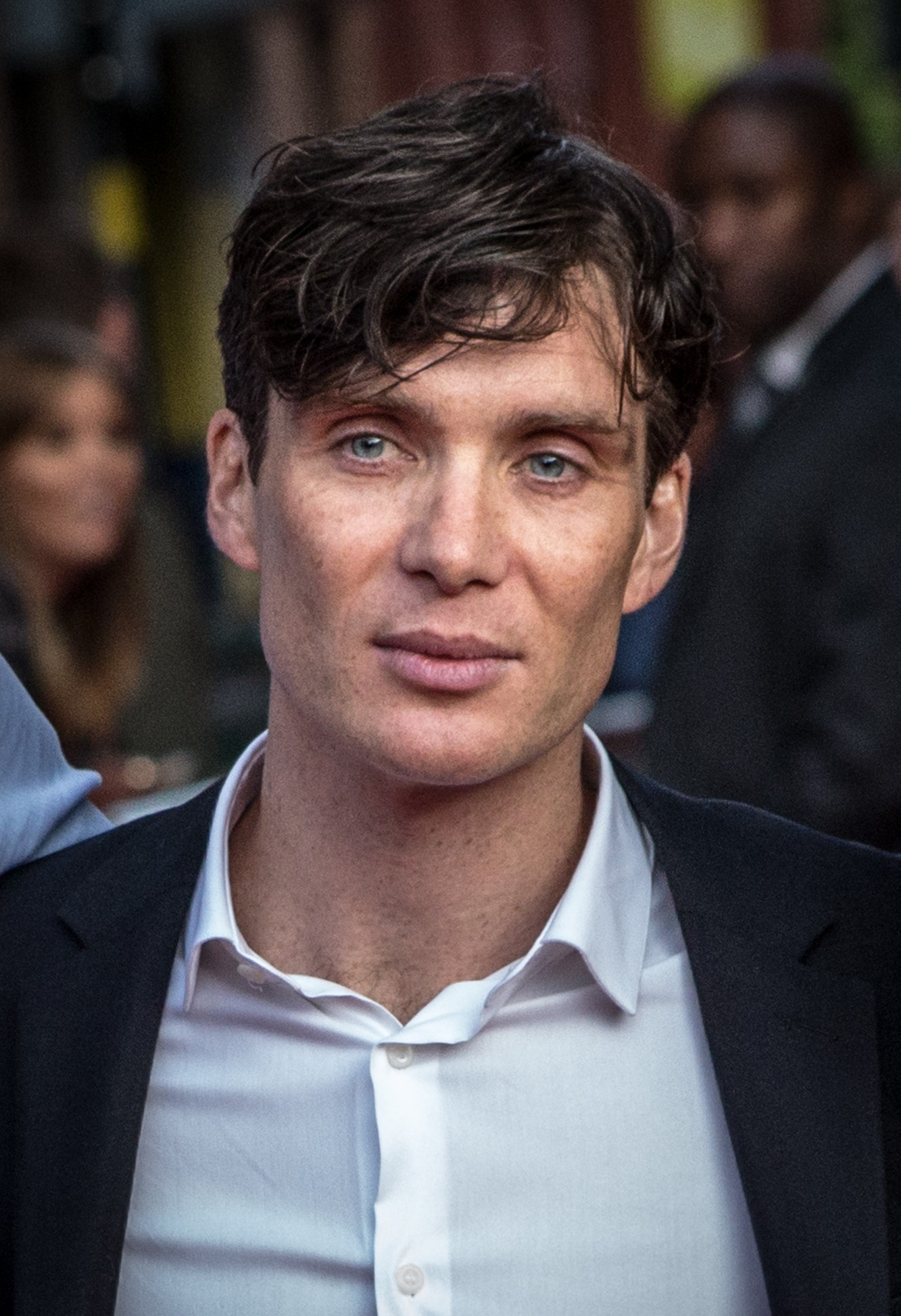
Murphy at the premiere of the second season of Peaky Blinders in 2014

Beginning in 2013, Murphy starred as Thomas Shelby in the BBC television series Peaky Blinders, a series about a criminal gang in Birmingham during the post-World War I period. Jason Statham was initially picked for the role by director Steven Knight, who met both actors to talk about the role. Knight later said, "Cillian, when you meet him, isn't Tommy, obviously, but I was stupid enough not to understand that". He picked Murphy after receiving a text message from Murphy that read, "Remember, I'm an actor". Murphy told The Independent, "[The scripts] were so compelling and confident, and the character was so rich and complex, layered and contradictory. I was like, 'I have to do this.'" Peaky Blinders was praised and received high ratings. A second series began broadcasting on the BBC in October 2014. On 25 August 2019, the first episode of season 5 was broadcast on BBC One. In an interview with Digital Spy, director Anthony Byrne said, "if we did start shooting in January (2021), we wouldn't finish until May or June and then it's another 6 months of editing". Series six premiered on 27 February 2022.

In 2013, Murphy made his directorial debut with a music video for the band Money's single Hold Me Forever. The video features dancers from the English National Ballet and was filmed at The Old Vic Theatre in London. In 2014, Murphy starred in the drama Aloft, and Wally Pfister's Transcendence. Both of these garnered mostly unfavourable critic reviews according to the aggregator Rotten Tomatoes. That same year, Murphy reunited with Enda Walsh in the play Ballyturk. He starred in Ron Howard's 2015 film In the Heart of the Sea. In 2015, he contributed spoken vocals to the tracks "8:58" and "The Clock" from Paul Hartnoll's album 8:58. The two previously met while Hartnoll was scoring the second season of Peaky Blinders. In 2016, Murphy starred in Ben Wheatley's Free Fire, and appeared in Anthropoid, in which he portrayed Czechoslovak World War II army soldier Jozef Gabčík, who was involved in Operation Anthropoid, the assassination of Reinhard Heydrich. Rupert Hawksley of The Telegraph said that Murphy's performance in Anthropoid was "solid, if unremarkable" and that he was "not asked to do an awful lot, other than smoke and look perplexed".

In 2017, Murphy played a shell-shocked army officer who is recovered from a wrecked ship in Christopher Nolan's war film Dunkirk, which emerged as a critical and box-office success. He felt that his character, who is nameless and was credited simply as Shivering Soldier, was "representative of something experienced by thousands of soldiers, which is the profound emotional and psychological toll that war can have". Murphy has also played a role in the feature film Anna as Miller, released in June 2019. His next release, A Quiet Place Part II (2021), stars Murphy as Emmett, a hardened survivor and old family friend of the Abbotts. Murphy's character reluctantly takes in the Abbotts following the events of the first film. Peter Bradshaw of The Guardian praised his performance.

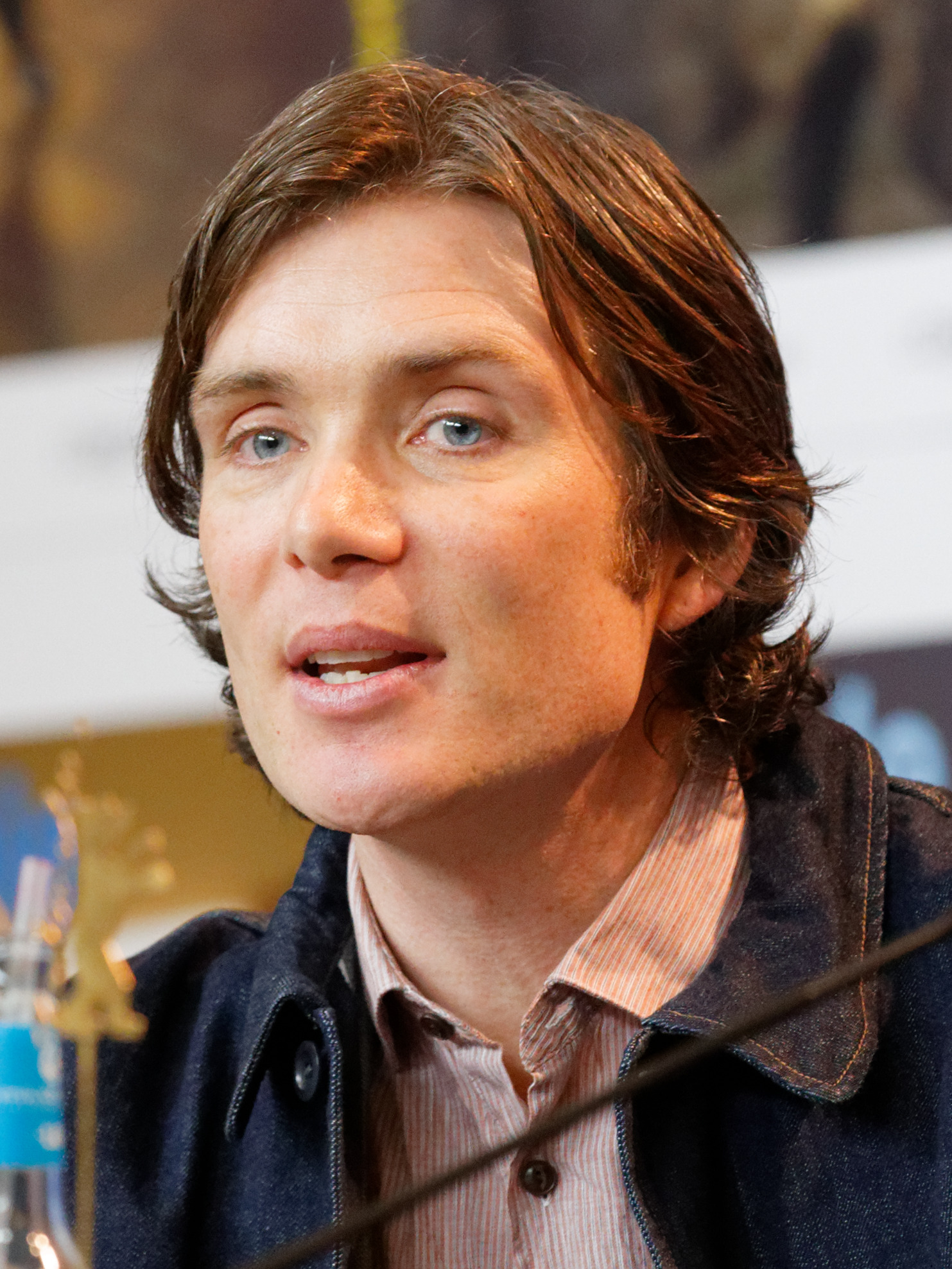
Murphy at a press conference for The Party at the Berlinale in 2017

Since 2020, Murphy has hosted Cillian Murphy's Limited Edition, a limited-run radio series broadcasting on BBC Radio 6 Music in which he draws from his personal music collection and answers "reasonable questions" from listeners. As of 2024, three seasons of Limited Edition have been produced, totalling 28 episodes.

Murphy portrayed J. Robert Oppenheimer in the biographical thriller Oppenheimer, released in 2023. The film marks the sixth collaboration between Nolan and Murphy, and the first starring Murphy as the lead. To prepare for the role, Murphy lost a significant amount of weight to match Oppenheimer's near-emaciated appearance, extensively researched Oppenheimer's life and took inspiration from David Bowie's appearance in the 1970s. Murphy's performance was lauded, with Empire's Dan Jolin writing: "At the film's pulsing nucleus is Murphy as Oppenheimer, and he is compelling throughout." For his performance, he won the Golden Globe Award for Best Actor in a Motion Picture – Drama, the BAFTA Award for Best Actor in a Leading Role, the Actor Award for Outstanding Performance by a Male Actor in a Leading Role, and the Academy Award for Best Actor. He was the first Irish-born performer to win the Academy Award for Best Actor.

Murphy launched the independent production company Big Things Films with Alan Moloney in February 2024. He produced and starred in the historical drama Small Things like These, which opened the 74th Berlin International Film Festival, and the drama film Steve, through a collaboration with Netflix. Murphy executive produced two of the sequels to 28 Days Later, titled 28 Years Later and 28 Years Later: The Bone Temple, reprising his role as Jim in the latter. In 2026, Murphy reprised his role as Shelby in the film Peaky Blinders: The Immortal Man, which served as a continuation of the Peaky Blinders series.

== Public image ==
Reserved and private, Murphy professes a lack of interest in the celebrity scene, finding the red carpet experience "a challenge" that he does not "want to overcome". He intentionally practises a lifestyle that will not interest the tabloids, stating, "I haven't created any controversy, I don't sleep around, I don't go and fall down drunk". He prefers not to speak about his life outside of acting and did not appear on any television talk shows until 2010, when he was a guest on Ireland's Late Late Show to promote Perrier's Bounty, remaining reserved. Murphy's introverted nature and lack of interest in social media has prompted several fans to create memes on his detached demeanour in press interviews. In 2017, upon being asked his opinion on the "Disappointed Cillian Murphy" meme, he answered, "What's a meme?"

In 2015, Murphy was named one of GQ's 50 best-dressed men, and in 2024, he was announced as the new face of Italian luxury fashion company Versace. He is also considered an unconventional sex symbol.

== Activism ==
Murphy participated in the 2007 Rock the Vote Ireland campaign, targeting young voters for the general election, and campaigning for the rights of the homeless with the organisation Focus Ireland. In 2011, he became a patron of the UNESCO Child and Family Research Centre at the University of Galway. He is closely associated with the work of Professor Pat Dolan, co-founder and former Director of the UNESCO Child and Family Research Centre and Emeritus Professor at UNESCO. In February 2012, he wrote a message of support to the former Vita Cortex workers involved in a sit-in at their plant, congratulating them for "highlighting [what] is hugely important to us all as a nation". Murphy was a supporter of the 2018 Irish referendum to repeal the eighth amendment of the constitution that restricted access to abortions, appearing on The Blindboy Podcast to urge men to support women and vote in favour of the referendum.

== Personal life ==
In 2004, Murphy married his longtime girlfriend Yvonne McGuinness, whom he met at one of his rock band's shows in 1996. They lived in Dublin until 2001 when they moved to London so his wife could attend the Royal College of Art. After 14 years, they moved back to Dublin in 2015. They have two sons; the youngest is actor Aran Murphy.

Murphy was raised Catholic. He stated that he had been verging on agnosticism until his role as a physicist and astronaut in the 2007 film Sunshine, at which point his views shifted towards atheism. In 2019, he said the Catholic faith still shaped his morality.

He was a vegetarian for around 15 years, which he said happened because he was "worried about getting mad cow disease" rather than a moral decision. He also had qualms about unhealthy agribusiness practices. He began eating meat again to bulk up for his role in Peaky Blinders. In a 2022 interview, he said he had returned to vegetarianism, and further clarified in 2026 that he has "always been pescatarian" and "[doesn't] eat any meat".

== Acting credits and awards ==
Murphy's most commercially successful films have been his many collaborations with Nolan, including Oppenheimer, Inception, Batman Begins, and Dunkirk. Following the success of Oppenheimer and the Barbenheimer phenomenon, Murphy was named in Variety's list of the most influential figures of 2023 in the entertainment and media industry. Murphy's works also include other critically acclaimed films, such as A Quiet Place II and The Wind that Shakes the Barley. He has received several accolades over the course of his career, including four IFTA Film & Drama Awards, a BAFTA Award, a Golden Globe Award, and an Academy Award.

== See also ==
- List of Academy Award winners and nominees from Ireland

== Bibliography ==
- Dendle, Peter (September 2012). The Zombie Movie Encyclopedia: 2000–2010. McFarland. ISBN 978-0-7864-6163-9. Archived from the original on 28 June 2014.
- Derry, Charles (29 October 2009). Dark Dreams 2.0: A Psychological History of the Modern Horror Film from the 1950s to the 21st Century. McFarland. ISBN 978-0-7864-5695-6. Archived from the original on 28 June 2014.
- Ebert, Roger (5 February 2013). Roger Ebert's Movie Yearbook 2007. Andrews McMeel Publishing. ISBN 978-0-7407-9219-9. Archived from the original on 28 June 2014.
- Johnson, David Kyle (31 October 2011). Inception and Philosophy: Because It's Never Just a Dream. John Wiley & Sons. p. 360. ISBN 978-1-118-16891-2
- Raphael, Amy (6 January 2011). Danny Boyle. Faber & Faber. ISBN 978-0-571-25537-5. Archived from the original on 28 June 2014.
