= Cosmetics International =

British trade magazine

- Categories: Trade magazine
- Frequency: Weekly
- Company: HPCi Media Ltd.
- Country: United Kingdom
- Based in: London
- Language: English
- Website: www.cosmeticsinternational.net
- ISSN: 0963-6137

Cosmetics International is a British weekly beauty products trade magazine. The magazine was published by Communications International Group until January 2013 when it began to be published by HPCi Media Ltd.

The magazine claims to have been in print for over 30 years. The headquarters of Cosmetics International is in London.
