= Retreat (2011 film) =

- Directed by: Carl Tibbetts
- Screenplay by: Janice Hallett; Carl Tibbetts
- Produced by: Gary Sinyor; Sir David Frost
- Starring: Cillian Murphy; Jamie Bell; Thandiwe Newton
- Cinematography: Chris Seager
- Edited by: Jamie Trevill
- Music by: Ilan Eshkeri
- Production companies: Magnet Films; Ripple World Pictures
- Distributed by: Vertigo Films
- Release date: 14 October 2011
- Running time: 88 minutes
- Country: United Kingdom
- Language: English
- Budget: $6.4 million

Retreat is a 2011 British psychological thriller film and the directorial debut of former film editor Carl Tibbetts. The film stars Cillian Murphy, Jamie Bell, and Thandiwe Newton as three people isolated from the rest of the world on a remote island. Two of them are told they are survivors of a fatal airborne disease that is sweeping over the entire world. However, their induced isolation may be the result of a lie, and it may be that they are being held at the whim of a madman.

== Plot ==
London architect Martin Kennedy and his unhappy journalist wife Kate often visit a small, remote, uninhabited island off the west coast of Scotland called Blackholme Island for their holiday retreats. The only dwelling on the island, Fairweather Cottage, is seasonally operated by owner Doug from the mainland and only reachable by ferry. After recently suffering a miscarriage, Kate's relationship with Martin has become tense, and in an effort to rekindle their marriage they decide on a return visit to the island. A few nights in, the generator in the cottage explodes, injuring Martin's arm and leaving them without electricity. They use the CB radio, the only source of communication to the mainland, to call Doug, who ferries out to help them.

Kate spends the next day waiting at the jetty for Doug to arrive, but to no avail. A man in green combat fatigues washes up, bloodied. When he awakes, he identifies himself as a soldier, Private Jack Corman. He tells Martin and Kate that there has been an outbreak of an airborne disease, Argromoto Flu, codenamed R1N16, that started in South America and has spread over the entire world in just a few weeks. The disease is incurable and highly contagious, attacking the respiratory system and causing victims to choke on blood with a 100% fatality rate. The British military have lost control, and are now advising civilians to seal themselves up in their homes. With only static coming from the CB radio, Martin decides to help Jack, who aggressively takes command and boards up the door and windows.

Over the next few days, Jack becomes increasingly strange and erratic, and his intimidating behaviour begins to disturb the couple further. They suspect that the virus may be a lie and that Jack is insane. The couple decides to leave the cottage and take their chances outside, but Jack refuses to let them, forcing them into the bedroom at gunpoint and locking them in. Martin sneaks outside through a skylight, finding the bodies of Doug and his wife at the pier, killed by gunshot. Using Doug's hunting shotgun, Martin gets the upper hand on Jack. Just as Kate begins to tie Jack up, Martin suddenly coughs up blood; it appears the Argromoto Flu is real and he is infected. Kate chooses to shoot her husband dead to spare him a slow and agonising death.

Forced at gunpoint, Jack reveals to Kate that he was experimented on at a military compound and released without anyone having realised he was a carrier of R1N16. Jack had infected his wife, killing her, and fled to Blackholme Island to quarantine himself, where the couple found him. The CB radio had been working all along, but Jack had changed the settings so Kate and Martin would not be able to reach anyone.

Jack fixes the CB radio, and a military broadcast on it claims the soldiers now have a vaccine against the virus, but Jack tells Kate that the military are lying; there is no vaccine, and the military would kill them both if they were discovered. Kate does not believe him and, angered by the possibility that Martin could have been saved, shoots Jack dead. As she attempts to leave the island in the boat with Martin’s body, a military helicopter flies over and she is killed by a sniper who shoots her in the head.

== Cast ==
- Cillian Murphy as Martin Kennedy
- Thandiwe Newton as Kate Kennedy (credited as Thandie Newton)
- Jamie Bell as Pvt. Jack Corman
- Jimmy Yuill as Doug, the boat ferryman and owner of Fairweather Cottage

== Release ==
Retreat premiered at the Fantasia Film Festival on July 18, 2011 and received a limited release in the United Kingdom and the United States respectively on October 12 and 14 2011.

== Reception ==
On Rotten Tomatoes, Retreat holds a score of 62%, based on 13 reviews, and an average rating of 5.5/10.

Bloody Disgusting rated it 4.5/5 stars and praised the intense, chilling atmosphere and plot twists. Peter Bradshaw of The Guardian rated it 3/5 stars and called it "a neat, tense thriller from a first time director that provides a decent role for Jamie Bell". John Anderson of Variety wrote, "A potential menage a trois of terror is served up as rather weak tea in Retreat, which fails to make its alleged suspense, thrills or even its mist-enshrouded landscapes particularly plausible." Neil Smith of Total Film rated it 3/5 stars and called it "tense if rather monotonously bleak". Mark Adams of Screen Daily wrote, "An unrelentingly moody and claustrophobic three-handed thriller, Retreat is an assured and nicely staged debut from Carl Tibbetts that might feel all rather familiar but manages to keep the story suitably unpredictable and nicely paced." Damon Wise of Empire wrote that the performances make up for the story. David Nussair of Reel Film Reviews wrote that "Retreat inevitably (and lamentably) establishes itself as a generic and hopelessly uninvolving thriller that grows more and more tedious as it progresses." Scott Weinberg of Fearnet concluded that the film is "certainly more engaging than its basic premise might imply".

== See also ==
- Dead Calm
- It Comes at Night
