= Sunshine (2007 film) =

Film by Danny Boyle

- British theatrical release poster
- Directed by: Danny Boyle
- Written by: Alex Garland
- Produced by: Andrew Macdonald
- Starring: Rose Byrne; Cliff Curtis; Chris Evans; Troy Garity; Cillian Murphy; Hiroyuki Sanada; Benedict Wong; Michelle Yeoh
- Cinematography: Alwin Küchler
- Edited by: Chris Gill
- Music by: John Murphy; Underworld
- Production company: DNA Films
- Distributed by: Fox Searchlight Pictures
- Release dates: 23 March 2007 (Fantasy Filmfest); 6 April 2007 (United Kingdom); 27 July 2007 (United States)
- Running time: 107 minutes
- Countries: United Kingdom; United States
- Language: English
- Budget: $40 million
- Box office: $34.8 million

Sunshine is a 2007 science fiction psychological thriller film directed by Danny Boyle and written by Alex Garland. It features an ensemble cast, including Rose Byrne, Cliff Curtis, Chris Evans, Troy Garity, Cillian Murphy, Hiroyuki Sanada, Benedict Wong, and Michelle Yeoh. Set in 2057 as a global freeze threatens human extinction, the film follows the crew of a spacecraft on a mission to deliver a stellar bomb intended to reignite the dying Sun.

The film was shot primarily at 3 Mills Studios in London, with cinematography by Alwin H. Küchler. The film's score was composed by John Murphy with contributions from the band Underworld. The production consulted scientific advisers including physicist Brian Cox.

Sunshine premiered at the Fantasy Filmfest in Germany on 23 March 2007, and was released in the United Kingdom on 6 April 2007 by Fox Searchlight Pictures, followed by a wide release in the United States on 27 July. It received generally positive reviews from critics, and grossed $35 million against a $40 million budget. Production designer Mark Tildesley won Best Technical Achievement at the British Independent Film Awards.

== Plot ==
In 2057, the Sun is dying and Earth is freezing. Eight astronauts aboard the starship Icarus II are sent on a last-chance mission to deliver and detonate a colossal stellar bomb intended to reignite the Sun. As the ship passes Mercury, it receives a distress beacon from Icarus I, the earlier mission that had disappeared seven years prior. Despite engineer Mace's objections, Captain Kaneda, acting on a recommendation from physicist Capa, decides to divert course in order to investigate and also to double the mission's success potential should the identical stellar bomb payload on the original ship prove operational as backup.

Navigator Trey plots the new route but inadvertently overlooks realigning the ship's heat shields, damaging reflective panels that protect Icarus II from direct sunlight. Pilot Cassie angles the vessel into Mercury's shadow while Kaneda and Capa perform a spacewalk to repair the shield. The operation destroys two of the ship's communications towers, and reflected light incinerates the oxygen garden, reducing air reserves. When the emergency autopilot forces the ship back into its original alignment, Kaneda orders Capa to retreat and completes the final repair himself, moments before a wave of sunlight engulfs and kills him. Trey blames himself for losing Kaneda, and psychologist Searle sedates him after judging him a suicide risk.

Now lacking sufficient oxygen to reach the Sun and deploy the bomb, Icarus II docks with Icarus I to salvage resources. Capa, Searle, Mace and communications officer Harvey board the derelict ship while Cassie and biologist Corazon remain on Icarus II with Trey. Although Icarus I appears largely operational, its mainframe has been sabotaged, preventing payload delivery. Mace finds a damaged entry log from Captain Pinbacker, badly burned and insisting their mission defies God, dated to roughly six and a half years earlier. On the observation deck, Searle discovers the charred bodies of the Icarus I crew, who were apparently exposed to unfiltered solar radiation.

An explosive decoupling separates the ships and destroys Icarus I's outer airlock, stranding the boarding team. With only one intact spacesuit and limited insulation, they decide that Capa, despite Harvey's protests, must take the suit because he is the only crew member able to arm the bomb. Searle stays behind to open the airlock, allowing the others to jettison back toward Icarus II using insulation for protection. Harvey misses the airlock and freezes to death, while Capa and Mace make it back. Left alone on Icarus I, Searle returns to the observation deck and exposes himself to unfiltered sunlight, killing himself.

Back aboard Icarus II, Corazon calculates that the remaining oxygen will only sustain four people to the Sun. In order to preserve oxygen, the crew votes to have Mace kill Trey, but Trey has already committed suicide. Although the mission now seems possible, the ship's systems still detect five life signs. Capa investigates and finds Pinbacker alive now aboard Icarus II, having boarded during the docking and caused the decoupling. Pinbacker attacks Capa, traps him in an airlock, disables the ship by lifting its mainframes from coolant baths, and kills Corazon. Mace attempts to manually reset the mainframes, and succeeds with two, but the third crushes his leg and traps him in the coolant; freezing, he urges Capa to finish the mission.

Capa pierces an interior hatch with a blowtorch and opens an exterior airlock so decompression tears away the obstruction and frees him, allowing him to deploy the payload. The bomb structure separates from Icarus II, and Capa makes a leap towards the payload as the ship is destroyed by solar radiation. Inside the payload, he finds a wounded Cassie, but Pinbacker confronts them again, claiming he has spent years "speaking to God," and subdues Capa; Cassie pulls Capa away, and he tears burned skin from Pinbacker's arm. As the bomb's gravity shifts, Capa reaches the controls and detonates the payload; in his final moments, spacetime distorts and he reaches out to the Sun's surface as it reignites.

On Earth, Capa's sister and her children build snowmen on a frozen Sydney Harbour. As they listen to Capa's final transmission, the sun brightens and sunlight begins to shine down on them.

== Cast ==
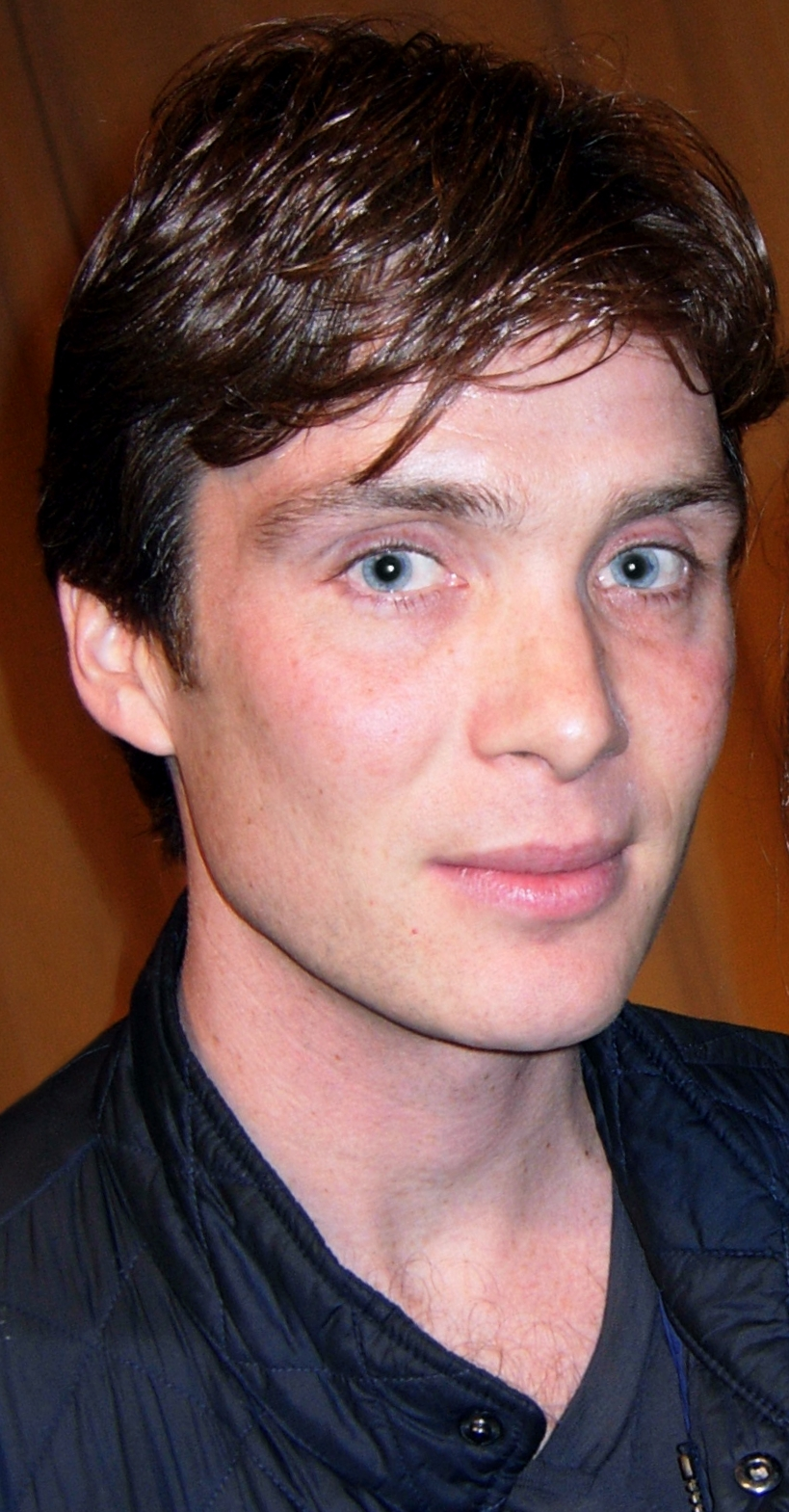
Actor Cillian Murphy who portrayed physicist Robert Capa

- Cillian Murphy as Robert Capa, the physicist who operates the massive stellar-bomb device. Murphy described the character of Capa as a silent outsider, which was due to the fact that only Capa understood the operation and true scale of the bomb. Murphy worked with physicist Brian Cox, who praised Murphy's performance as "brilliant" and a "great portrayal as a physicist", to learn about advanced physics, touring the CERN facility and learning to copy physicists' mannerisms. The actor also studied the thriller The Wages of Fear (1953) with Boyle to gain an understanding of the type of suspense that Boyle wanted to create in the film. Murphy said that his involvement in the film caused him to change his views on religion from agnosticism to atheism.
- Chris Evans as James Mace, the engineer. Evans described his character Mace as one with a military family and background. Mace has a dry and morally uncomplicated personality. Said Evans, "[He] has a very level head which enables him to operate fairly coherently under pressure-filled situations."
- Rose Byrne as Cassie, the space vessel's pilot. Byrne was chosen by the director for her role in Troy (2004). Byrne described Cassie as the most emotional member of the crew, "wearing her heart on her sleeve". Byrne considered Cassie's role among the crew was to possess an even temperament, which helps her last the journey.
- Michelle Yeoh as Corazon, the biologist who takes care of the ship's "oxygen garden". Boyle cast Yeoh based on her performance in Tomorrow Never Dies (1997), and Memoirs of a Geisha (2005). Yeoh described her character as more spiritual, explaining Corazon's background as an "Asian influence or that she's always constantly surrounded by organic things – she's very grounded and more down-to-earth."
- Cliff Curtis as Searle, the ship's doctor and psychological officer. He is obsessed with the Sun and how it looks when staring at it without any type of protection. The role of Searle was originally written to be a "slightly stiff" British character. Curtis was drawn to the role based on the script and also expressed interest in working with the director. Boyle was familiar with Curtis from Training Day (2001) and Whale Rider (2002), and Curtis's audition appealed to Boyle strongly enough to cast the actor as Searle. Curtis initially foresaw an esoteric approach for his character, but he later pursued a military and scientific approach based on the seriousness of the mission. The actor also compared Searle to the character of Pinbacker, noting their similarities and differences: "[Searle] would sacrifice those beliefs and views, his life, for the greater good, whereas Pinbacker, who's come to a place he believes is right, would sacrifice the world for his beliefs. They're two sides of the same coin."
- Troy Garity as Harvey, the communications officer and second-in-command. Garity's previous work was unknown to Boyle, but the director was impressed enough with the actor upon meeting him that he cast Garity. Garity described the character of Harvey as the only crew member who misses his family back home on Earth and attempts to hide the fact.
- Hiroyuki Sanada as Kaneda, the ship's captain. The script originally had an American captain, but Boyle changed the nationality to Japanese after studying the opinions of scientists and space experts. Boyle saw Sanada in The Twilight Samurai (2002), and director Wong Kar-wai recommended the actor to Boyle when the latter sought someone to cast as the Asian captain of the ship. Sanada's character was originally called Kanada, but he asked Boyle to change the name to Kaneda, a more natural Japanese name. The character was Sanada's second English-language role in cinema, and Sanada learned different forms of English, depending on the circumstances. Sanada's base English language had a British dialect, and when the actor recited official statements as Kaneda, the dialect was official English. In communicating with other characters as Kaneda, Sanada spoke with an American English accent to reflect the fictional situation of the character training with the rest at NASA.
- Benedict Wong as Trey, the navigator. Boyle saw Wong in Dirty Pretty Things (2002). Wong's character, Trey, was a child prodigy who created a computer virus that brought down one-sixth of the world's computers. As a result, Trey is recruited into the space program so his genius could be applied more beneficially.
- Chipo Chung as the voice of "Icarus", the on-board computer of the spacecraft Icarus II possesses a "natural-language" communication interface, allowing the crew to ask questions, give orders, and receive status updates and warnings verbally, as if they were talking to a human. Indeed, the ship itself is a major character in the movie. This was Chung's first named film role.
- Mark Strong as Pinbacker, the murderous captain of Icarus I, the first ship that was sent to reignite the Sun. Pinbacker was inspired by the character of Sergeant Pinback from Dark Star. The character's disfiguring burns were influenced by the injuries suffered by F1 driver Niki Lauda. Boyle described the character of Pinbacker as a representation of fundamentalism. The director also described the potentially unrealistic presence of Pinbacker as an example of something that breaks the pattern of realism, similar to his scene in Trainspotting (1996) in which Ewan McGregor's character dives into a toilet.
- Paloma Baeza as Capa's sister.

== Production ==
=== Origins ===
In March 2005, following the completion of Millions (2004), director Danny Boyle was briefly attached to direct 3000 Degrees, a Warner Bros. project about the 1999 Worcester Cold Storage Warehouse fire in Massachusetts. Opposition from surviving victims and firefighters prevented the project from entering production. At the same time, Boyle received a script from screenwriter Alex Garland, who had paired with Boyle for The Beach (2000) and 28 Days Later (2002). Producer Andrew Macdonald, working with Boyle and Garland, pitched the script to 20th Century Fox, who were reluctant to finance the film based on its similarities to the 2002 remake Solaris, which performed dismally for the studio. The project was instead financed by Fox's specialised film unit Fox Searchlight Pictures. Since the preliminary budget at US$40 million was too demanding for Fox Searchlight, Macdonald sought outside financing from British lottery funds, U.K. rebates, and outside investor Ingenious Film Partners. With financing in place, Boyle entered pre-production work for Sunshine, for which he planned to commence production by the following July. Since Boyle had previously worked with Fox Searchlight on 28 Days Later, the existing relationship permitted the director freedom in production, working in a small studio.

Boyle and Garland worked on the script for a year, spent a second year preparing for production, filmed for three months, and spent a third full year editing and completing visual effects for Sunshine. After completion of filming for Sunshine, Boyle said that he would not revisit the science fiction genre, citing production as a spiritually exhausting experience. The director said making the film had conquered his fear of the difficulty encountered in producing a science fiction film, and that he would move on from the genre.

=== Casting ===
Director Danny Boyle chose to have an ensemble cast for Sunshine to encourage a more democratic process, similar to the ensemble cast in Alien. Boyle also chose to have the cast be international in order to reflect the mission's purpose "on behalf of all mankind". The space crew in the film also consisted of American/Asian nationality because of the filmmakers' belief that the American and Chinese space programs would be the most developed and economically empowered 50 years in the future. The director had also received advice that there would be advanced space programs with India and Brazil, but the advice was overlooked to avoid creating a cast that was too disparate. According to producer Andrew Macdonald, the actors were required to speak with American accents to target the US audience as much as audiences from other parts of the world due to the budget level of the project.

To prepare the international actors for the film, Boyle had the cast undergo method acting. At the beginning of the film, the characters had been together for sixteen months, so Boyle desired to capture a sense of togetherness among the actors by assigning them to live together. He also enrolled the cast members in space training and scuba diving, as well as watching films together, such as The Right Stuff (1983) and the documentary For All Mankind (1989). Boyle also took the cast on a tour of a nuclear submarine to comprehend claustrophobic living conditions. He also had the cast experience weightlessness in the zero G environment of an acrobatic plane.

Cast members operated a Boeing 747 flight simulator and were introduced to futurologist Richard Seymour. The book Moondust by Andrew Smith, a collection of accounts of the men who had walked on the Moon, was required reading for cast members. The book had been assigned by Boyle because it described the lasting psychological changes experienced by that particular group of astronauts. The director sought to manifest the effect by showing the Sun's awesome, radiant power influencing the psyches of the ship's crew.

Michelle Yeoh was originally offered the role of the Captain (played by Sanada in the film) but turned it down as she felt she was not ready to play such a part.

=== Writing and scientific inaccuracy ===
Screenwriter Alex Garland was inspired to write Sunshine based on scientific ideas about the heat death of the universe. Garland had wondered about what would result from the Sun's death after reading in an American scientific periodical "an article projecting the future of mankind from a physics-based, atheist perspective". Garland said of the project: "What interested me was the idea that it could get to a point when the entire planet's survival rests on the shoulders of one man, and what that would do to his head." Garland brought the script to director Danny Boyle, who enthusiastically took up the project due to his long-time desire to direct a science fiction film set in space. Boyle and Garland worked on the script for a year, creating 35 drafts in their experimenting.

Boyle also considered the story of Sunshine as a counterintuitive approach for the contemporary issue of global warming, with the death of the Sun being a threat. Originally, Sunshine was scripted to begin with a voiceover talking about how parents tell their children not to look into the Sun, but once told, the children would be compelled to look. Boyle described the Sun as a godlike personality in the film, creating a psychological dimension for the astronauts due to its scale and power. The director also described the film's villain as based on light, explaining: "That's quite a challenge because the way you generate fear in cinema is darkness." The director also sought to have the characters experience a psychological journey in which each person is worn mentally, physically, and existentially and is experiencing doubt in their faiths. To capture the dangers of the voyage that the crew members went through, the director cited Bill Bryson's A Short History of Nearly Everything as influential in "articulating the universe's power".

The story was also written in part to reflect the brilliance and "necessary arrogance" of real life science when the world's scientists are presented with the crisis that threatens Earth. The time period of the story, 50 years in the future, was chosen to enable the level of technology to advance to the ability to travel to the Sun, but to simultaneously keep a feel of familiarity for the audience. Scientific advisers, futurists, and people who developed products for the future were consulted to shape an idea of the future.

To shape the science of the film, Boyle and Garland hired scientific advisers, including NASA employees and astrophysicists. Brian Cox, a professor of particle physics at the University of Manchester, was hired to advise the cast and crew after the director had seen Cox on the science TV series Horizon. Cox gave regular lectures to the film's cast members about solar physics, and also advised the filmmakers to scale down the nuclear device in the film from the mass of the Moon to the size of Manhattan. In the film's backstory, a Q-ball enters and is caught in the Earth's Sun, and begins to eat it away. According to Cox, the Sun would not be dense enough in real life to stop a Q-ball, but filmmakers took creative licence in writing the backstory. Cox noted in the DVD commentary that several inaccuracies were permitted to allow for plot. He also dismissed criticisms of the film by scientists: "Sunshine is not a documentary. It's trying to just, in an hour and forty minutes, get across a feeling of what it's like—not only to be a scientist, because obviously there's much more in it than that. So, I found it interesting to watch the kind of people that get upset because the gravity is wrong."

Boyle originally included romantic subplots, including a sex scene planned between the characters Capa (Murphy) and Cassie (Byrne) in the ship's oxygen garden. However, the director considered the attempt for relationships in space too "embarrassing" and excluded the subplots. Boyle further distanced the characters from possible relationships by ensuring that the cast members wore little to no make-up to avoid any romantic overtures. The director also avoided including humour in the script with the exception of a few gags, believing that humour was a difficult fit for the story. "You get intensity of experience in space movies but not joy. So there's not much room for comedy or sex – everything is waiting to destroy you", explained Boyle.

Slow motion during weightlessness was inaccurately portrayed; the director had discovered this when riding the Vomit Comet, but he kept the slow motion to meet audiences' expectations. Another purposeful inaccuracy was the "whooshing" of the ship, despite there actually being no sound in the vacuum of space; Cox later mentioned in the BBC's Stargazing Live programme in January 2011 that this was simply because without accompanying sound, the CGI shots seemed "cheap".

The film's scientific content has been criticised by specialists. For example, the science periodical New Scientist said that the nuclear stellar bomb used by the crew would be woefully inadequate to reignite the dying Sun (billions of such devices would be required). The periodical found the film to be confusing and disappointing. Similarly, solar physicist Anjana Ahuja, a columnist for The Times, commented on the lack of source of artificial gravity on board the spacecraft, saying "Danny Boyle could have achieved the same level of scientific fidelity in Sunshine by giving a calculator to a schoolboy". Ahuja was, however, more positive about the psychological aspect of the film, joking that "the psychology of extended space travel is covered well, although we could have done with a space bonk".

=== Filming ===
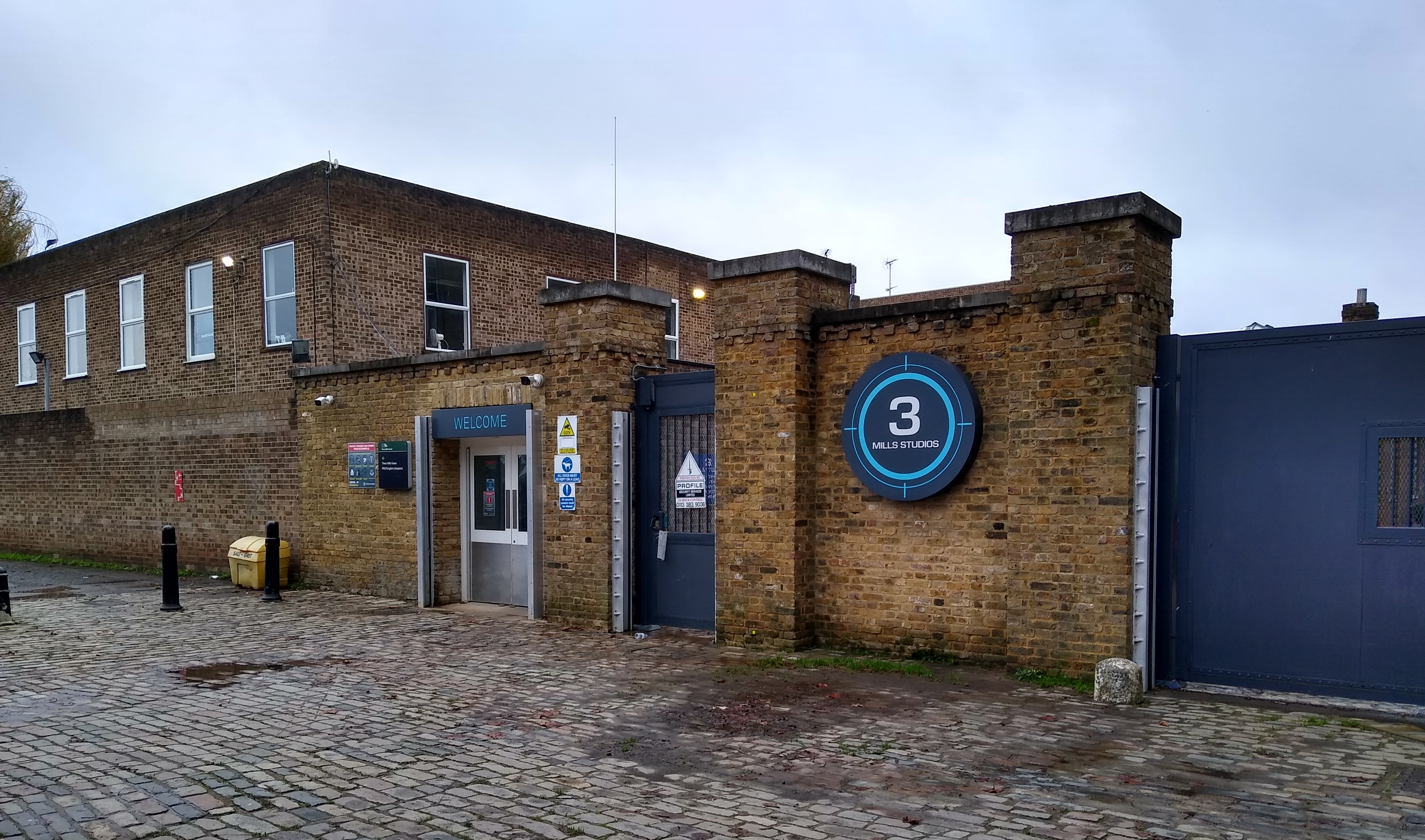
3 Mills Studios

Filming for Sunshine took place at 3 Mills Studios in east London. An elaborate set was constructed, containing eight stages, 17 sets, and detailed models. The filmmakers employed three film units. Filming began on 23 August 2005, lasting for 15 weeks, with August and September being difficult months due to the heat and the cast's requirement to wear spacesuits for their roles. Cinematographer Alwin H. Küchler chose to film in anamorphic format to capture a physical sense of the light. "We shot certain sequences in a very dark environment, which you get used to, so when the Sun plays a role, we wanted the audience to have a physical reaction to it", Kuchler said. Due to filming with the actors taking place on a stage, director Danny Boyle constructed live effects so the actors could realistically respond to computer-generated effects that were later implemented.

To increase the feeling of claustrophobia in Sunshine, Boyle refused to cut back to scenes on Earth, a traditional technique in most films about the planet in jeopardy. The director also maintained an atmosphere of confinement in Sunshine by avoiding filming the primary ship, Icarus II, from the outside. There are only a few outside shots of the ship. He also attempted to avoid filming star field backgrounds, keeping the ship's exterior pitch black, but he was ultimately compelled to show stars outside the spacecraft to help convey a sense of the ship's movement.

A scene in a snow-covered park with three stone monoliths was a homage to a similar scene in 2001: A Space Odyssey. The scene was filmed at a May Day memorial in Stockholm, Sweden. The Sydney Opera House in Sydney, Australia, was chosen by Boyle out of six monuments that he considered universally recognisable. The Opera House, according to the director, possessed a "heat-thing" quality that decided it as his choice for a final establishing shot on Earth.

The snowy territory of the final scene was shot in Stockholm, Sweden, and a composite shot was created combining Stockholm's background and the Sydney Opera House. A slightly different ending was shot after the original but was not chosen as the director felt that it did not fit the film. The alternative ending became available on the DVD of Sunshine.

=== Design and visual effects ===
The presspack says that the claustrophobic environment in the film was inspired by Wolfgang Petersen's Das Boot (1981). Boyle also cited inevitable visual influences from science fiction films in space by Andrei Tarkovsky (Solaris in 1972), Stanley Kubrick (2001: A Space Odyssey in 1968), and Ridley Scott (Alien in 1979). Influences from other science fiction films also included Paul W. S. Anderson's Event Horizon (1997), John Carpenter's Dark Star (1974), and Douglas Trumbull's Silent Running (1971).

The 'Kenny' Suit – The spacesuit's colour scheme was chosen to deflect heat and radiation in the film, and the helmet was purposely designed to be a claustrophobic experience for the actors.

Filmmakers consulted NASA in designing the scientific aspects of the film. Technical specifications for the ship were provided in order to make it more realistic. An oxygen garden was also recommended to provide oxygen for the ship and to enable the crew to grow their own food rather than rely completely on pre-packaged sustenance. Boyle met with a department within NASA that was focused on the psychology of deep-space travel, and they advised the director that regular Earth routines like preparing one's own food, enjoying its consumption and cleaning up afterwards are activities crucial to an astronaut's sanity.

The gold-leaf shielding in Sunshine was influenced by NASA satellite designs for deflecting heat and other forms of radiant energy. Boyle designed the gold-coloured space suits along these lines despite persistent encouragement to model them after the NASA template. The helmets were designed to have cameras mounted in them. This further enhanced a sense of claustrophobia useful to the actors in delivering more heartfelt performances. The helmets were also limited to a horizontal slit for visibility instead of a full-face visor as further consideration toward protecting the characters from the ambient radiation of outer space. According to Boyle, the funnel shape of the helmet was influenced by the character Kenny from South Park.

Boyle included "Icarus" in the name of the ship to continue a theme of bleakness, opining that no American would give their craft such an ill-fated name. According to the director, "They'd call it Spirit of Hope or Ship of Destiny. They'd call it something optimistic ... in America they would sacrifice all plausibility, because there would be hope." The ship's exterior was designed to look like an oil tanker. The ship's interior was influenced by the design of a nuclear submarine that filmmakers had visited in Scotland, though the space was larger due to NASA's advice that smaller quarters would adversely affect the crewmembers' sanity. The corpses of burn victims in the film were modelled on the Pompeii victims from the Mount Vesuvius eruption.

Cinematographer Alwin H. Küchler provided the idea to render the interior of the ship in the colours of grey, blue, and green, with no reference to orange, red, or yellow. Scenes were intended to be shot inside the ship at long intervals, and when the shot changed to the outside, yellow-starved audiences would be "penetrated" by sunlight. The visual effects of the sunlight were based on photographs from the Solar and Heliospheric Observatory project. Boyle also sought to pursue inexpensive methods in filming sequences involving actors and visual effects. In a scene where Cillian Murphy's character dreams of falling into the Sun, the actor was placed in a gantry around which 20 assistants rotated an assembly of bright lights.

In another scene in which a character dies from solar exposure among the ashes from cremated bodies, massive wind turbines propelled biodegradable dust at the actor in the director's attempt to have the computer-generated effects follow the actor instead of vice versa. Boyle commented on his approach to using effects, "There is part of our brain where we admire the effect, but we put it in a side compartment of our experience because you know there's no way an actor can live through that, or be there in that moment." During the post-production process, Boyle hired one visual effects company, London's Moving Picture Company, to work on the film's 750 visual effects. The assignment of a single company was contrary to the industry trend of hiring multiple vendors to work on a film's effects. Boyle chose one company for ease of quality control, though the decision resulted in a prolonged post-production process.

=== Music and soundtrack ===
When the film was mostly complete, director Danny Boyle provided the footage to the band Underworld, who improvised a score. Karl Hyde of Underworld was influenced by the music of avant garde composer György Ligeti which had been used in Stanley Kubrick's 2001: A Space Odyssey (1968). Lux Aeterna by Ligeti particularly influenced Hyde. When Underworld finished recording, the band sent its work to composer John Murphy, who completed the score. The final result was a hybrid product of Underworld and Murphy's efforts. The band I Am Kloot also contributed to the score with the track "Avenue of Hope".

Despite high praise for the score from fans of the film, a soundtrack release was significantly delayed. This was partly due to "disputes" between the lawyers of Underworld and Fox Searchlight. Although not available close to the film's debut, the soundtrack was finally released on iTunes USA on 25 November 2008.

== Release ==
=== Theatrical run ===
Sunshine was originally slated for a theatrical release in October 2006, but the release was later changed to March 2007. The film was finally set to debut in April 2007. Sunshine made its world premiere at the Fantasy Filmfest in Bochum, Germany, on 23 March 2007.

The film was originally slated to be released in the United States in September 2007, but the release date was moved earlier to July 2007. Sunshine was released in the United States and Canada at select locations in Los Angeles, New York City, Chicago, San Francisco, Boston, and Toronto on 20 July 2007 and then opened wide on 27 July. Sunshine opened in 10 cinemas in the United States and took US$242,964 over the opening weekend.

=== Home media ===
In the United Kingdom, the film was released on DVD on 27 August 2007 and on Blu-ray on 29 October 2007. Both formats were released in the United States on 8 January 2008. A UMD version for the PlayStation Portable was released on 17 December 2008 in the United Kingdom. The film is also available on Video on demand.

Extras on both formats include deleted scenes with commentary by Danny Boyle, an alternative ending, web production diaries, two short films – Dad's Dead and Mole Hills with intros by Danny Boyle, and two commentaries – one with Boyle and one with Dr. Brian Cox of the University of Manchester. The Blu-ray edition adds an enhanced viewing mode with the filmmakers, Journey Into Sound - an interactive surround sound mixing feature, and the theatrical trailer in high definition.

As of 17 February 2008, Sunshine had grossed $15.83 million in rental sales.

== Reception ==
=== Critical response ===
The film was moderately well received in the UK by critics. However, many found the last reels disappointing, with one critic suggesting the switch to "slasher movie" mode might have been inserted to appease teenage audiences.

Among mainstream critics in the US, the film received generally positive reviews. The film holds a 77% approval rating on Rotten Tomatoes based on 172 reviews, with an average rating of 7.10/10, and the consensus that "Danny Boyle continues his descent into mind-twisting sci-fi madness, taking us along for the ride. Sunshine fulfills the dual requisite necessary to become classic sci-fi: dazzling visuals with intelligent action." At Metacritic, which assigns a weighted average out of 100 to critics' reviews, the film received a score of 64 based on 34 reviews.

Sean Axmaker, writing in the Seattle Post-Intelligencer, said the film presented a "visionary odyssey with a grace and awe and visual scope that calls to mind Stanley Kubrick's 2001: A Space Odyssey for a new millennium, with echoes of the industrial grunge and crew friction of Alien, the greenhouse ecology of Silent Running, even the unraveling sanity of Dark Star." Film critic Roger Ebert in the Chicago Sun-Times referred to the special effects in the film as "convincing and remorseless" and that the film was at its strongest point when it "focuses on the sheer enormity of the mission and its consequences". In Variety, Derek Elley wrote that the film was "gripping enough with its solid performances, good-looking CGI, underlying tension and resonant, iron-hard digital soundtrack. This film reflects education excellence." He reserved praise for the production merits, noting, "Boyle generally directs fluidly, making the most of p.d. Mark Tildesley's sensible, not-too-futuristic sets, lensed with cool reserve by Alwin Kuchler."

The drummed-up suspense at the end is not essential, since Boyle and Garland seem more interested in the metaphysics of the voyage; Tarkovsky's Solaris demonstrated that if you go all the way with the implications of such a situation, it's more interesting than using plot devices.

— Roger Ebert writing in the Chicago Sun-Times

Conversely, writing for the San Francisco Chronicle, Mick Lasalle bluntly noted that the motion picture starts out "bad" and later "gets worse". He summed up his displeasure by stating, ""Sunshine" has nothing to offer, and this nothing is going to be offered relentlessly and earnestly, like a holy missive." In a primarily negative review, Joanne Kaufman, writing for The Wall Street Journal, called the film "a warmed-over stew of sci-fi and gothic horror". Unenthusiastic, she affirmed, "There are the predictable malfunctions that compromise the space craft, the banal speechifying about the fate of mankind, the issue of who will live and who will die. Who cares? The characters are so sketchily drawn that it's hard to keep them straight, let alone get worked up about their survival." Also describing an unfavourable opinion, Marrit Ingman of The Austin Chronicle professed the film exhibited "problems which arise in the film's third act" which causes "a profoundly implausible plot turn that sends the movie skidding into bogeyman horror. It cheapens the sentiment, and the film doesn't recover."

Nathan Lee of The Village Voice said the film "works despite feeling both over-familiar and over-ambitious. It crescendos with a legitimate sense of wonder (if not profundity) thanks in large part to the luminous and uncanny score by electro legends Underworld." Writing for The New York Times, Manohla Dargis viewed director Boyle as a "first-rate, seemingly sweat-free entertainer" who always "sells the goods smoothly, along with the chills, the laughs and, somewhat less often, the tears". She went on to say, "He's wickedly good at making you jump and squirm in your seat, which he does often in Sunshine, but he tends to avoid tapping into deep wells of emotion." Wesley Morris in The Boston Globe mused that if the film didn't "float your boat as a work of science-fiction, action, philosophy, heliocentrism, or staggering visual spectacle (although, it really should), then it certainly succeeds as a parable for cinematic ambition." He emphatically added, "The surface of this movie is plenty enthralling on its own." Desson Thomson of The Washington Post commented that for the film, "The voyage works, beautifully. While we don't get the ticklish conceit of Scottish profanities in the celestial outer realm, we do get something surprisingly consoling: a deep sense of the humanity that we always carry with us, no matter how far we venture from home."

=== Box office ===
The film was released commercially in its home country of the United Kingdom on 6 April 2007, taking £1,021,063 in 407 cinemas for its opening weekend. The film also opened the same weekend in seven other markets, performing most strongly in Hong Kong (US$267,000), Taiwan (US$442,000) and Singapore (US$198,000). On the weekend of 13 April 2007, Sunshine opened in 22 more countries, garnering US$5.3 million for the weekend. Its French debut was the strongest with US$1.2 million in 380 cinemas, but the film only had an average performance in New Zealand (US$120,149 from 36 cinemas), Switzerland (US$60,285 from 11 cinemas) and Finland (US$42,745 from 15 cinemas).

The following weekend of 20 April 2007, the film's release expanded to 44 countries, garnering US$5.9 million for a total of US$18.6 million thus far, considered a disappointing amount. Sunshine had poor debuts in Spain (US$1 million), Germany (US$638,549), and Italy (US$453,000). By the end of April, Sunshine had opened to most countries, with the notable exception of the United States, for which a release date had yet to be established at the time. The film's cinematic run in the UK lasted twelve weeks, totaling £3,175,911.

The film was released everywhere else in the two countries the following weekend of 27 July 2007. In the film's first wide release weekend in Canada and the United States, Sunshine took US$1,262,996 in 461 cinemas, ranking no. 13 at the weekend box office. In its theatrical run, the film took a worldwide gross of US$32,017,803.

=== Accolades ===
The film won the award for Best Technical Achievement from the British Independent Film Awards 2008 and was nominated for several other awards in 2007–08.

Award	Category	Nominee	Result
British Independent Film Awards 2007	Best Technical Achievement	Mark Tildesley	Won
British Independent Film Awards 2007	Best Actor	Cillian Murphy	Nominated
13th Empire Awards	Best British Film	————	Nominated
13th Empire Awards	Best Sci-Fi/Fantasy	————	Nominated
Evening Standard British Film Awards	Best Film Score	John Murphy	Nominated
Evening Standard British Film Awards	Best Technical Achievement	Chris Gill, Alwin Kuchler	Nominated
5th Irish Film & Television Awards	Best Actor in a Lead Role in Film	Cillian Murphy	Nominated
London Film Critics Circle Awards 2007	British Director of the Year	Danny Boyle	Nominated
Las Vegas Film Critics Society	Best Picture	————	Nominated
Los Angeles Film Festival	Film Presented	————	Nominated
Satellite Awards 2007	Best Art Direction and Production Design	Mark Tildesley, Gary Freeman, Stephen Morahan, Denis Schnegg	Nominated
34th Saturn Awards	Best Science Fiction Film	————	Nominated

== See also ==
- Solar Crisis, a film with a similar premise of dropping a bomb into the Sun to save the Earth.
- Solar Attack
- Stellar evolution
- Sun in culture
- The Core
