= Catherine Walsh (actress) =

Irish actress, stage actor and film actor

- Born: 1969 (age 56–57); Cork, Ireland
- Occupation: Actress

Catherine Walsh (born 1969) is an Irish actress.

== Early life and education ==
Catherine Walsh was born in Friars Walk, Cork. She grew up with four siblings, including a young sister Eileen who is also an actor. Walsh attended the South Presentation Convent, an all-girls school, where she participated in the British farces organised by teacher and RTÉ sports commentator Ger Canning. In 1987, while working as an assistant stage manager at the Gate Theatre, she auditioned for the National Youth Theatre and later performed in Arthur Miller's The Crucible directed by Ben Barnes. Barnes, and another theatre luminary, encouraged her to study acting at the Trinity College Dublin. She trained at the college's Samuel Beckett Centre.

== Career ==
Walsh predominantly works as a theatre actress. During the 1990s, she performed in the Werewolves (Druid Theatre Company), Phaedra (Gate Theatre), Buddleia (Passion Machine), From Both Hips (Fishamble Theatre Company), and Licking the Marmalade Spoon (Baois Theatre Company).

Walsh first gained popularity for her performance in Eugene O'Brien's 2001 play Eden, which premiered at the Abbey Theatre's Peacock stage in Dublin and later transferred to London's West End. Walsh's portrayal of Breda earned her the 2002 The Irish Times/ESB Theatre Award for Best Actress. In 2001, she also performed in Jim Nolan's Blackwater Angel at the Abbey Theatre.

Walsh appeared in a 2003 Druid Theatre Company production of John B. Keane's Sharon's Grave, which was directed by Garry Hynes and choreographed by David Bolger. Sharon's Grave, alongside Sive (2002) and Year of the Hiker (2006), was part of a "self-constructed trilogy" of Hynes-directed Keane's plays. Walsh portrayed Freda in Year of the Hiker. In 2004, she performed in Brian Friel's Dancing at Lughanasa, directed by Joe Dowling, at the Gate Theatre. In 2005, Hynes conceptualized DruidSynge, the first ever staging of John Millington Synge's six-play theatrical canon featuring The Playboy of the Western World, In the Shadow of the Glen, The Tinker's Wedding, The Well of The Saints, Riders To The Sea and Deirdre of The Sorrows. Walsh portrayed Pageen Mike in The Playboy of the Western World which premiered at the Galway International Arts Festival, and was later performed at the Town Hall Theatre (Galway), Olympia Theatre, Dublin and Edinburgh International Festival.

In 2021, Walsh portrayed Madge in the production of Brian Friel's Philadelphia, Here I Come at the Cork Opera House, Ireland.

Walsh has collaborated with her sister Eileen in several productions. In 2022, they both performed in Enda Walsh's The Same at the Irish Arts Centre in Manhattan, New York. Produced by Corcadorca Theater Company, the play was directed by Pat Kiernan.

== Awards and recognition ==
Best Actress award for her performance in Eden at the Irish Times/ESB Theatre Awards 2001

== Performances ==
=== Stage ===
- Sharon's Grave
- Werewolves
- Eden
- The Gigli Concert
- Translations
- Kevin's Bed
- Blackwater Angel
- At Swim Two Birds
- Love in the Title
- Dancing at Lughnasa
- A Christmas Carol
- Phaedra
- Buddleia by Paul Mercier;
- From Both Hips by Mark O'Rowe;
- Licking the Marmalade Spoon by David Parnell
- The Chastitute and Big Maggie by J.B. Keane

=== Radio ===
- Eden by Eugene O'Brien
- The Monotonous Life of Little Ms. P by Enda Walsh
- Swanscross by Gina Moxley.

=== Screen ===
- 2015 My Name Is Emily
- 2013 The Stag
- 2004 Holby City (TV Series)
- 1999 The Ambassador (TV Series)
- 1999 The Last September
- 1997 Before I Sleep (Short)
- 1994 Family (TV Mini-Series)
