= Druid Theatre Company =

Irish theatre company

The Druid Theatre Company, referred to as Druid, is an Irish theatre company, based in Galway, Ireland.

As well as touring extensively across Ireland, the company's productions have played internationally to Australia, Canada, New Zealand, the UK and the USA. Druid has been a "pioneer" in the development of Irish theatre and is credited (alongside Macnas and the Galway Arts Festival) with making Galway one of the primary cultural centres in Ireland.

== History ==
In 1975, the company was founded by Garry Hynes, Marie Mullen and Mick Lally—all of whom first met and worked together as members of University College Galway dramatic society, commonly known as Dramsoc. It was the first Irish professional theatre company to be established outside Dublin.

Since 1979, Druid has owned a theatre building in Galway City Centre. The former tea storehouse was originally owned by the McDonaghs, one of Galway's wealthy merchant families. In the late 1970s, the company negotiated a peppercorn rent with the owners which enabled the company to renovate and install its own venue and rehearsal space, which the McDonagh family later donated to Druid. In 2011, following refurbishment, what was originally known as the Druid Theatre was renamed The Mick Lally Theatre in memory of Druid co-founder, the late Mick Lally. The theatre serves as a dedicated workspace for the company and has also established itself as a cultural facility for the promotion and the development of the arts in Galway. The lane on which the theatre is situated has gone by numerous names, including Red Earls' Lane, Chapel Lane, Courthouse Lane, and since 1996, Druid Lane, when Galway City Council renamed it in celebration of the company’s 21st birthday.

In 1996, Druid premiered Martin McDonagh's debut play The Beauty Queen of Leenane, in a co-production with the Royal Court Theatre, London. Following an opening in Galway, the production played across Ireland, in London, Sydney, and New York City. During its Broadway run, the production won four Tony Awards, including Best Director for Garry Hynes—the first woman to win an award for directing in the history of the awards ceremony. In 2005, the company presented DruidSynge, a production of all six plays of John Millington Synge as a day-long theatrical event, at the Galway Arts Festival to critical acclaim. Several years later, Druid revived a trilogy of Tom Murphy's plays (Conversations on a Homecoming, A Whistle in the Dark and Famine) entitled DruidMurphy; this production later won several Irish Times Irish Theatre Awards in 2014. Druid continued to present large-scale ensemble productions in 2015 with DruidShakespeare—William Shakespeare’s Richard II, Henry IV, Part 1, Henry IV, Part 2 and Henry V in a new adaptation by Mark O'Rowe—which toured Ireland, the UK, and the prestigious Lincoln Center Festival.

As of 2013, a permanent Druid Ensemble existed to work alongside artistic director Garry Hynes to further the artistic programme of the company and to "investigate new creative possibilities." This ensemble is composed of Marie Mullen, Marty Rea, Rory Nolan, Aaron Monaghan, Aisling O’Sullivan, Garrett Lombard and Derbhle Crotty.

== Key productions ==
This is extensive list of the key productions which have been produced and performed by the Druid Theatre Company over the span of forty four years. However, some productions have been omitted.

- Conversations on a Homecoming, by Tom Murphy. World premiere, directed by Garry Hynes and starring Paul Brennan, Jane Brennan and Marie Mullan. (1985).
- Bailegangaire, by Tom Murphy. World premiere, directed by Garry Hynes and starring Siobhán McKenna, Marie Mullan, Mary McEvoy (1985).
- At the Black Pig's Dyke, by Vincent Woods. World premiere (1992), directed by Maeliosa Stafford.
- The Beauty Queen of Leenane, by Martin McDonagh. World premiere, directed by Garry Hynes and starring Anna Manahan, Marie Mullen, Tom Murphy and Brian F. O'Byrne (1996).
- The Lonesome West, by Martin McDonagh. World premiere, directed by Garry Hynes and starring Brian F. O'Byrne, Dawn Bradfield and Maeliosa Stafford (1997).
- A Skull in Connemara, by Martin McDonagh. World premiere, directed by Garry Hynes and starring Mick Lally, Anna Manahan, Brian F. O'Byrne (1997).
- On Raftery’s Hill, by Marina Carr. World premiere (2000).
- Sive, by John B. Keane. Directed by Garry Hynes and starring Anna Manahan, Derbhle Crotty, Ruth Bradley, Eamon Morrissey (2002).
- The Playboy of the Western World, by John Millington Synge. Directed by Garry Hynes and starring Cillian Murphy, Anne-Marie Duff, Aisling O'Sullivan, Eamon Morrissey (2004).
- DruidSynge, plays by John Millington Synge. Directed by Garry Hynes and starring Aaron Monaghan, Marie Mullen, Catherine Walsh, Eamon Morrissey (2005).
- The Walworth Farce, by Enda Walsh. World premiere, directed by Mikel Murfi and starring Aaron Monaghan, Garrett Lombard, Denis Conway (2007).
- My Brilliant Divorce, by Geraldine Aron. World premiere, directed by Garry Hynes and starring Deirdre O’Kane (2007).
- The Cripple of Inishmaan, by Martin McDonagh. Directed by Garry Hynes and starring Aaron Monaghan and Marie Mullen (2008).
- The Gigli Concert, by Tom Murphy. Directed by Garry Hynes and starring Denis Conway, Eileen Walsh (2009).
- The New Electric Ballroom, by Enda Walsh. World premiere, directed by Garry Hynes and starring Rosaleen Linehan, Catherine Walsh, Mikel Murfi (2009).
- Penelope, by Enda Walsh. World premiere, directed by Mikel Murfi and starring Aaron Monaghan, Denis Conway, Karl Shiels, Niall Buggy (2010).
- The Silver Tassie, by Sean O'Casey. Directed by Garry Hynes and starring Aaron Monaghan, Derbhle Crotty, John Olohan, Eamon Morrissey (2010).
- Big Maggie, by John B. Keane. Directed by Garry Hynes and starring Aisling O'Sullivan, Keith Duffy, John Olohan, Charlie Murphy, Sarah Greene. (2011).
- DruidMurphy: Conversations on a Homecoming, A Whistle in the Dark, Famine; by Tom Murphy. Directed by Garry Hynes and starring Aaron Monaghan, Marty Rea, Marie Mullen, Garrett Lombard, Rory Nolan, John Olohan, Eileen Walsh, Niall Buggy, Sarah Greene, Gavin Drea (2012).
- The Colleen Bawn, by Dion Boucicault. Directed by Garry Hynes and starring Aaron Monaghan, Marie Mullen, Marty Rea, Aisling O'Sullivan, Rory Nolan (2013).
- Be Infants in Evil, by Brian Martin. World premiere presented as part of a double bill with Bailegangaire, directed by Garry Hynes and starring Marty Rea (2014).
- Brigit, by Tom Murphy. World premiere, directed by Garry Hynes and starring Marie Mullen, Catherine Walsh, Aisling O'Sullivan, Marty rea, Jane Brennan, (2014).
- DruidShakespeare: Richard II, Henry IV Part 1, Henry IV Part 2, Henry V, by William Shakespeare, adapted by Mark O'Rowe (2015). Directed by Garry Hynes and starring Marty Rea, Marie Mullen, Aisling O'Sullivan, Derbhle Crotty, Aaron Monaghan, Rory Nolan, Garrett Lombard, John Olohan, Gavin Drea.
- Helen and I, by Meadhbh McHugh. World premiere, directed by Annabelle Comyn and starring Cathy Belton and Rebecca O'Mara.
- The Beauty Queen of Leenane, by Martin McDonagh. Twentieth anniversary revival, directed by Garry Hynes and starring Marie Mullen, Aisling O'Sullivan, Marty Rea, Aaron Monaghan (2016)
- Waiting for Godot, by Samuel Beckett, directed by Garry Hynes and starring Marty Rea, Aaron Monaghan, Rory Nolan and Garrett Lombard.
- Crestfall, by Mark O'Rowe. Directed by Annabelle Comyn and starring Siobhán Cullen, Kate Stanley Brennan and Amy McElhatton (2017).
- King of the Castle, by Eugene McCabe. Directed by Garry Hynes and starring Marty Rea, John Olohan, Seán McGinley (2017).
- Sive, by John B. Keane. Directed by Garry Hynes and starring Marie Mullen, Tommy Tiernan (2018).
- Furniture, by Sonya Kelly. World premiere, directed by Cathal Cleary and starring Aisling O'Sullivan, Rebecca O'Mara, Garrett Lombard, Niall Buggy (2018).
- Shelter, by Cristín Kehoe. World premiere, directed by Oonagh Murphy and starring Aaron Monaghan, Rory Nolan (2018).
- DruidShakespeare: Richard III, by William Shakespeare. Directed by Garry Hynes and starring Marty Rea, Aaron Monaghan, Garrett Lombard, Jane Brennan, Rory Nolan (2018).

== The Beauty Queen of Leenane ==
Garry Hynes returned to the Druid Theatre Company as its artistic director in 1995, after stepping down from the Abbey Theatre (artistic director, 1991–1994). It was during this time that Hynes and her colleague Anne Butler read The Beauty Queen of Leenane—a script submitted by an unknown writer named Martin McDonagh. Several months later, on 1 February 1996, McDonagh's play received its world premiere at the newly refurbished Town Hall Theatre, Galway, in a co-production between Druid and the Royal Court Theatre, London. Directed by Hynes, the cast consisted of four actors: Druid founding member Marie Mullen as Maureen Foley; Anna Manahan as her elderly mother Mag; Brian F. O'Byrne as Ray Dooley; and Tom Murphy as Pato Dooley. The response, from both audiences and critics alike, was immediate and overwhelmingly positive. As noted in the Sunday Times on 10 March 1996, The Beauty Queen of Leenane was "one of the most exhilarating debuts in years".

The production then toured Ireland before transferring to the Royal Court Theatre, London, on 24 Feb 1996. Following this critically acclaimed run, the production moved to Ireland where it embarked on an extensive national tour before returning again to London's West End where it played at the Duke of York's Theatre for several months, beginning on 29 November 1996. It was later nominated at the 1996 Olivier Awards for Play of the Year. In February 1998, the production received its American off-Broadway premiere at the Linda Gross Theater, in a co-production with the Atlantic Theater Company, before it transferred to Broadway's Walter Kerr Theatre on 23 April 1998.

Later that year, The Beauty Queen of Leenane received six nominations at the 52nd Tony Awards: Best Play, Best Direction of a Play, Best Actress, Best Supporting Actress, as well as two nominations for Best Supporting Actor. At the ceremony on 7 June, the production won four awards: Best Actress (Marie Mullen); Best Supporting Actress (Anna Manahan); Best Supporting Actor (Tom Murphy); and Best Director for Garry Hynes—a historical win as Hynes became the first female recipient of a Tony Award for Direction.

In addition, the original Druid Theatre production received the 1998 Drama Desk Award for Outstanding Play; the Drama League Award for Best Play; the Outer Critics Circle Award for Best Broadway Play; and the Lucille Lortel Awards for Outstanding Play and Outstanding Director. The Beauty Queen of Leenane has since gone on to be staged across the world in several languages, but Druid's original version remains, for many, the definitive production.

In 2016, to mark the 20th anniversary of the iconic production, Druid revived The Beauty Queen of Leenane with Marie Mullen. Having originated the role of Maureen, Mullen now played the role of Mag. The production also starred Druid ensemble members Aisling O'Sullivan (Maureen), Marty Rea and Aaron Monaghan. At that year's Irish Times Irish Theatre Awards, Hynes won the Award for Best Director while both Mullen and O'Sullivan received separate nominations for Best Actress.

== DruidSynge ==
In the summer of 2005, Druid presented the first ever staging of John Millington Synge's entire theatrical canon—Riders to the Sea; The Tinker's Wedding; The Well of the Saints'; In the Shadow of the Glen; The Playboy of the Western World; and Deirdre of the Sorrows which was unfinished at the time of Synge's death. Described by The Irish Times as "one of the greatest achievements in the history of Irish theatre", this collective presentation of all six plays was performed as a series of double bills over two or three days.

DruidSynge premiered at the 2005 Galway Arts Festival, opening at the Town Hall Theatre on Saturday 16 July, followed by performances in Dublin's Olympia Theatre and the Edinburgh International Festival before concluding its 2005 run with a week of performances on the Aran Island of Inis Meain in a range of locations including an open-air setting at Dun Chonchur (a large circular walled fortress).

== DruidMurphy ==
Since 1980, there existed a strong working relationship between Druid and the Irish playwright Tom Murphy. In 1985, Druid presented the world premieres of Conversations on a Homecoming and Bailegangaire—considered to be two of Murphy’s greatest plays.

In November 2011, Garry Hynes announced the company’s next large-scale ensemble project would be entitled DruidMurphy—three plays by Tom Murphy presented as a trilogy. This theatrical event was co-produced by Druid, NUI Galway, the Galway Arts Festival, Lincoln Center Festival in New York City, and the Quinnipiac University in Hamden, Connecticut where the world's largest collection of art, artifacts and printed materials relating to the Great Irish Famine resides. Although Murphy did not expressly write the plays Conversations on a Homecoming (1985), A Whistle in the Dark (1961) and Famine (1968) as a trilogy, Druid’s presentation of the three plays sought to connect them thematically in order to provide an illuminating and "unflinching look at the impact of emigration on the Irish psyche over a hundred year period". As Garry Hynes noted: "Murphy writes an inner history of Ireland, a nation that has now - under the pressure of a debt crisis that has become an identity crisis - come to re-examine the materials and rhetorical strategies out of which it makes itself."

DruidMurphy received its premiere at the Galway Arts Festival 2012. Following the festival, the trilogy conducted an extensive national tour of Ireland–playing in Cork, Limerick, Waterford, Tuam, Dublin, Inis Mor and Inis Meain of the Aran Islands, before transferring to the Oxford Playhouse, followed by the Hampstead Theatre in London, the Lincoln Center Festival in New York City, and the Kennedy Center for the Performing Arts in Washington, D.C. All three plays were directed by Garry Hynes with a repertoire cast consisting of sixteen actors including recurring Druid performers Marie Mullen, Aaron Monaghan, Garrett Lombard, Rory Nolan, Marty Rea, Gavin Drea, Eileen Walsh and John Olohan. Depending on the venue, the trilogy could be viewed individually over three consecutive evenings or experienced as a day-long cycle which lasted over nine hours.

The theatrical event won Best Production at the 2012 Irish Times Irish Theatre Awards and received widespread critical acclaim, being hailed by The New York Times as "epic theatre making". DruidMurphy dominated the acting categories with a further six nominations. Marty Rea, Gavin Drea and Eileen Walsh were nominated for Best Actor, Best Supporting Actor and Best Actress respectively for their performances in A Whistle in the Dark. Garrett Lombard, Aaron Monaghan and Marie Mullen received nominations for Best Actor, Best Supporting Actor and Best Supporting Actress respectively.

== DruidShakespeare ==
In 2014, to celebrate the 40th anniversary of the Druid Theatre Company’s founding, Garry Hynes announced her intention direct four of William Shakespeare’s history plays, often referred to collectively as The Henriad: Richard II; Henry IV, Part 1; Henry IV, Part 2; and Henry V. To adapt these history plays, Hynes approached the Irish writer Mark O'Rowe whom she had previously worked with when directing the world premiere of his play Crestfall at the Gate Theatre in 2003.

At the March 2015 press launch for DruidShakespeare, Hynes voiced her opinion that "acting is, first and foremost, an act of imagination. That imagination transcends nationality, character, geography, background; and we see no reason why it shouldn’t transcend gender either." With Druid’s decision to utilise gender-blind casting, the roles of King Richard II, King Henry IV and Hal/King Henry V were performed by one male actor and two female actors: Druid Ensemble members Marty Rea, Derbhle Crotty and Aisling O’Sullivan respectively.

DruidShakespeare premiered at Druid’s own Mick Lally Theatre, rather than Galway’s Town Hall Theatre—a first for Druid’s major productions. Described as an "enthralling marathon production" by The New York Times, the production ran for over six hours and was viewed as either a day-long presentation or divided into two halves across consecutive evenings, with an ensemble of thirteen actors—consisting of primarily Druid recurring performers—playing more than fifty characters across the four plays. It later toured across Ireland before transferring to the Gerald W. Lynch Theatre in New York City, after which it returned to Ireland where it played as the closing production for the Kilkenny Arts Festival 2015.

The production was critically acclaimed, with Peter Crawley of The Irish Times stating that "[t]here is nothing quite as beautiful, or as torturous, as the crown of England we see in Druid’s remarkable staging". DruidShakespeare dominated The Irish Times Irish Theatre Awards 2015 where it won Best Production, Best Director, Best Actress (Derbhle Crotty), Best Actor (Marty Rea), Best Costume Design while also acquiring nominations for Best Actress (Aisling O’Sullivan), Best Supporting Actor (Rory Nolan), Best Set Design, Best Sound Design, and a Judge’s Special Award nomination for the way in which the company had assembled and enabled a group of actors to work as a true ensemble, "the pinnacle of this rare achievement being DruidShakespeare."

Druid presented DruidShakespeare: Richard III in 2018, a follow-up to their Henriad Cycle which was co-produced with the Abbey Theatre, Dublin. It premiered on 22 September at the Town Hall Theatre, Galway before moving to the Abbey Theatre where it ran from 3–27 October. In January 2019, The Irish Times Irish Theatre Awards shortlist announced that the Druid production of Richard III had been recognised for Best Production, Best Director (Garry Hynes), Best Actor (Aaron Monaghan), Best Set Design, and Best Costume Design. The winners will be announced on 31 March.
