= Simone Kirby =

Irish actress

- Born: 28 October 1976 (age 49)
- Occupation: Actress
- Years active: 2005–present

Simone Kirby (born 28 October 1976) is an Irish actress. She is known for playing Oonagh in the Ken Loach film Jimmy's Hall. Other credits include Irene O'Donnell in Peaky Blinders (2014), Marilyn Hull in Notes on Blindness (2016), Tyva Hightopp in Alice Through The Looking Glass (2016), Sr. Grace in Houdini and Doyle (2016), Maria Roche in The Truth Commissioner (2016), Annette Rane in Clean Break (2015), Tracey Moynihan in Love/Hate (2014), Dolores in Kneecap (2024), and Geraldine Grehan in the RTÉ series Pure Mule. She co-wrote and performed in the RTÉ comedy sketch show Meet Your Neighbours in 2011 with P.J. Gallagher. She also appeared in Season of the Witch in 2011.

On stage she has appeared in Dancing at Lughnasa at The Old Vic, Macbeth at Shakespeare's Globe, Molly Sweeney at the Irish Rep in New York and Curve in Leicester, Festen at the Gate Theatre, Mud and Cat on a Hot Tin Roof with the Corn Exchange, Dublin, Don Carlos and The Taming of the Shrew with Rough Magic and The Tinker's Wedding under Garry Hynes for the Druid Theatre Company's DruidSynge. She also portrayed Nuala in The Cavalcaders under Robin Lefevre and Lady Teasle in The School For Scandal under Jimmy Fay at Dublin's Abbey Theatre.

== Filmography ==
=== Film ===
Year	Title	Role	Notes
2011	Season of the Witch	Midwife	
2014	Jimmy's Hall	Oonagh	
2014	Xmoor	Patsy	
2016	Notes on Blindness	Marilyn Hull	
2016	The Truth Commissioner	Maria Roche	
2016	Alice Through The Looking Glass	Tyva Hightopp	
2016	The Flag	Liz	
2017	England Is Mine	Elizabeth Morrissey	
2019	The Hole in the Ground	Louise Caul	
2019	Calm with Horses	June	
2020	Dating Amber	Jill	
2020	Artemis Fowl	Miss Byrne	
2024	Kneecap	Dolores	

=== Television ===
Year	Title	Role	Notes
2005	Pure Mule	Geraldine Grehan	6 episodes
2008	Single Handed	Brigid	2 episodes
2009	Pure Mule: The Last Weekend	Geraldine Grehan	2 episodes
2011	Meet Your Neighbours	Auntie Maureen / Mrs. Balfe	
2014	Peaky Blinders	Irene O'Donnell	3 episodes
2014	Love/Hate	Tracey Moynihan	Episode #5.2
2015	Clean Break	Annette Rane	4 episodes
2016	Houdini and Doyle	Sister Grace	Episode: "The Maggie's Redress"
2016	Rebellion	Ursula Sweeney	5 episodes
2018	Mother's Day	Fran	Television film
2018	Dark Heart	Debbie Collins	2 episodes
2019	Silent Witness	Geraldine Lawson	2 episodes
2019	Resistance	Ursula Sweeney	5 episodes
2020–2022	His Dark Materials	Dr. Mary Malone	12 episodes
2021	The One	Charlotte Driscoll	6 episodes
2021–2023	Hidden Assets	Bibi Brannigan Melnick	12 episodes
2023	The Buccaneers	Laura Testvalley	Main role
2025	Video Nasty	Ethel	
2025	Irish Blood	Una Murphy	6 episodes

== Awards and nominations ==
Year	Awarding Body	Category	Nominated work	Result	Ref
2015	IFTA Award	Best Actress in a Lead Role - Film	Jimmy's Hall	Nominated	
2017	IFTA Award	Best Supporting Actress – Film	Notes on Blindness	Nominated	
2022	IFTA Award	Best Supporting Actress – Drama	Hidden Assets	Nominated	
2025	IFTA Award	Best Supporting Actress – Film	Kneecap	Nominated	
