= DruidSynge =

Theatre production of plays by John Millington Synge

DruidSynge is a theatre production of the complete plays of John Millington Synge by the Irish Druid Theatre Company. It was the vision of Garry Hynes, the first woman to win a Tony Award for best director, to create the day-long cycle of all six plays;

- Riders to the Sea
- The Tinker's Wedding
- The Well of the Saints
- In the Shadow of the Glen
- The Playboy of the Western World
- Deirdre of the Sorrows

It has been performed as a series of double bills over two or three days or, as in New York City in 2006, all six plays are presented on the same day. This is an exacting production for the actors: many perform in several of the plays, changing roles up to five times, like Marie Mullen, a Tony award-winning actress who plays the lead in five of the six plays. Felicity O'Brien, the producer, commented that "They really have to pace themselves and be careful, but at the same time, it's an amazing challenge for any actor."

Premiered at the Galway Arts Festival in 2005 to critical acclaim, it was again produced at the Olympia Theatre, Dublin, the Edinburgh International Festival, and on the Aran island of Inis Meáin in different locations that included an open-air setting during 2005.

DruidSynge has been described by The Irish Times as: "One of the greatest achievements in the history of Irish theatre." The New York City premiere was held during the 2006 Lincoln Center Festival on 10 July, one of the seven performances that were preceded by productions in the Guthrie Theater, Minneapolis.
