= Marie Mullen =

Irish actress (born 1953)

- Born: 1953 (age 72–73); Sligo, Connacht, Ireland
- Education: NUI Galway
- Occupation: Actress
- Spouse: Seán McGinley (m. 1990)
- Children: 2 daughters

Marie Mullen (born 1953) is an Irish actress. She is known for co-founding the Druid Theatre Company, located in Galway, Ireland. She is also known for her performance in the 1998 production of The Beauty Queen of Leenane, for which she received a Tony Award for Best Actress in a Play.

== Life and career ==
=== Early years ===
Mullen is from Drumfin in the south of County Sligo. She said that she wanted "to try to be an actor from when I was in secondary school." Garry Hynes recalls meeting Mullen at Dramsoc at UCG in 1971, when they were both 17, and casting her in The Loves of Cass Maguire. She attended NUI Galway studying archaeology. She met Hynes and Mick Lally, and they formed the Druid Theatre Company.

=== Theatre ===
As a founding member of Druid Theatre Company, she has appeared in many of their productions, including Conversations on a Homecoming (1985), and played the role of "Mary" in Tom Murphy's play Bailegangaire. She also originated the role of Maureen in Martin McDonagh's The Beauty Queen of Leenane (1996). She appeared on Broadway again in The Beauty Queen of Leenane in 1998, and won the Tony Award for Best Actress in a Play.

Other productions with Druid include Brigit and The Cripple of Inishmaan. She appeared Off-Broadway in The Cripple of Inishmaan in December 2008, in a co-production of the Druid Theatre Company and the Atlantic Theatre Company. She also played the role of "Mary", and 30 years later in 2014, the role of "Mommo", in Tom Murphy's play Bailegangaire, presented by the Druid Theatre Company at the Town Hall Theatre, Galway. Critic Peter Crawley for The Irish Times wrote that with Mullen's "astonishing performance comes an amplification of her earlier character’s pain and humour..." and called her performance "transcendental." She also appeared in Tom Murphy's Brigit, presented by the Druid Theatre Company in 2014, as "Mommo", the same character who is depicted in Bailegangaire.

Mullen acted in DruidSynge (2006), a theatre production of the complete plays of John Millington Synge, performed in the same day, by the Druid Theatre Company in which she played parts in five of the six plays. New York Times reviewer Charles Isherwood wrote: "I should start by mentioning the indispensable contributions of Marie Mullen — the great and glorious Marie Mullen I can’t resist calling her — whom New York theatergoers will remember for her Tony-winning portrayal of the frustrated heroine of 'Beauty Queen.'"

In 2007, she performed alongside James Cromwell in the Druid production of Long Day's Journey into Night. She appeared in DruidShakespeare at the Lincoln Center Festival in 2015, directed by Garry Hynes. Mullen played a "sharply etched assortment of men of state."

Mullen starred as Mrs. Paroo in the 2022 Broadway revival of The Music Man.

=== Film ===
She appeared in the 1994 film Circle of Friends as "Mrs. Foley". She appeared in the film Hear My Song (1991) as "Mickey's Mom".

=== Personal life ===
Mullen married Irish actor Seán McGinley in 1990, having first met in 1977; they have two children. Her husband has been associated with the Druid Theatre Company many times in the past.

== Accolades ==
Mullen won the 1998 Tony Award for Best Actress in a play for The Beauty Queen of Leenane.

Mullen received the 2012 Alumni Award for arts, social sciences and Celtic studies from NUI Galway.

She received the Special Tribute Award at the Irish Times Irish Theatre Awards in February 2013, recognizing her "immense contribution to Irish theatre."

Mullen received an honorary Doctorate of Arts from her alma mater, NUI Galway, in June 2016.

In 2018 Druid Theatre launched the Marie Mullen Bursary named in her honour. It is open to female dramaturgs, directors and designers.

=== Stage ===
Year	Title	Role	Notes
1985	Conversations on a Homecoming	Peggy	Druid Theatre Company
1986	Bailegangaire	Mary	Druid Theatre Company
1998	The Beauty Queen of Leenane	Maureen Folan	Walter Kerr Theatre, Broadway
2007	Long Day's Journey Into Night	Mary Tyrone	Druid Theatre Company
2008	The Cripple of Inishmaan	Kate	Atlantic Theater Company, Off-Broadway
2014	Brigit	Mommo	Druid Theatre Company
2015	DruidShakespeare	Northumberland, the Lord Chief Justice, Silence	Lincoln Center Festival
2017	The Beauty Queen of Leenane	Mag Folan	Brooklyn Academy of Music, Off-Broadway
2022	The Music Man	Mrs. Paroo	Winter Garden Theatre, Broadway
2023	The Saviour	Maire	Irish Repertory Theatre, Off-Broadway

== See also ==
- List of Irish actors
