= Don Wycherley =

Irish actor

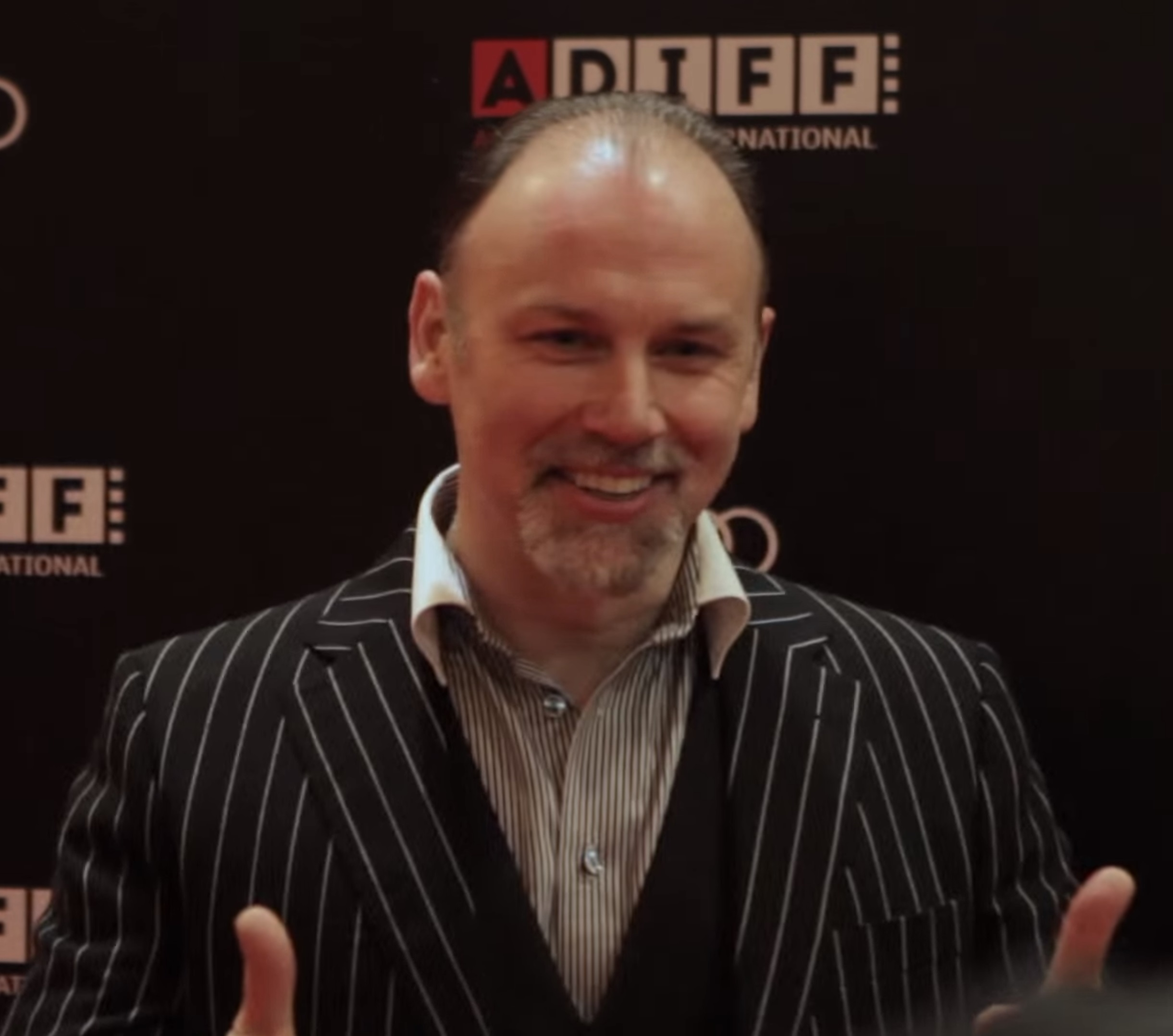
- Don Wycherley at the Dublin International Film Festival in 2016
- Born: 1966 or 1967 (age 58–59); Skibbereen, County Cork; Ireland
- Occupations: Actor, screenwriter
- Years active: 1994–present
- Spouse: Deirdre Wycherley
- Children: 3

Don Wycherley is an Irish actor. He played Father Cyril MacDuff in Father Ted, Father Aidan O'Connell in Ballykissangel, and Raymond in Bachelors Walk.

Wycherley is a fluent Irish speaker. He is the brother-in-law of actress Tina Kellegher. His father was Florence Wycherley, an independent Teachta Dála (TD) for Cork West from 1957 to 1961.

== Career ==
A graduate of St Fachtna's in Skibbereen, Wycherley trained in the Gaiety School of Acting, Wycherley's acting career began in The Abbey in the 1990's. He played Father Cyril, the Rugged Island version of Father Dougal McGuire. He played leading man Raymond in RTÉ's Bachelors Walk. In 2001, he appeared in Gerry Stembridge's Black Day at Black Rock, and in Eugene O'Brien's Eden. In 2005, he starred in The Abbey's The Shaughraun. In 2011, he portrayed US Civil War soldier Thomas Francis Meagher in a docuseries "Fág an Bealach". On stage, he has played Paddy Armstrong of the Guildford Four. In 2014 he played a Dingle fisherman in After Sarah Miles by Michael Hilliard Mulcahy. He has performed in Conor McPherson's The Seafarer.

In 2021, he played Minnie Driver's husband in the second season of Modern Love.

In 2023, Wycherley was performing a scripted interaction with disabilities activist Rosaleen McDonagh, at an Oireachtas Joint Committee on Assisted Dying, when he was inadvertently interrupted by Senator Mary Seery Kearney who misunderstood the nature of the performance.

He is a qualified primary school teacher and, as of 2019, was working in Scoil Assaim, Raheny.

== Personal life ==
Wycherly is married to Deirdre. They have three children.

== Selected filmography ==
- Father Ted (TV series; 1995–1998)
- Michael Collins (1996)
- Ballykissangel (TV series; 1998–2001)
- The General (1998)
- One Man's Hero (1999)
- Bachelors Walk (TV series; 2001–2003)
- Veronica Guerin (2003)
- Shrooms (2007)
- Garage (2007)
- Perrier's Bounty (2009)
- Ondine (2009)
- Zonad (2009)
- Pentecost (short film; 2011)
- Scúp (TV series; 2013)
- Moone Boy (TV series; 2014)
- Sing Street (2016)
- Wild Mountain Thyme (2020)
- Flora and Son (2023)
- Northern Lights (2023)

== IFTA nominations ==
Wycherley received a number of nominations for IFTA Film & Drama Awards, including:

Year	Category	Film	Result	Lost to
2007	Best Actor in a Lead Role in Television	The Running Mate	Nominated	Jonathan Rhys Meyers (The Tudors)
2007	Best Actor in a Supporting Role in a Feature Film	Speed Dating	Nominated	Brendan Conroy (Kings)
