= 52nd Tony Awards =

1998 US theatrical awards ceremony

- Date: June 7, 1998
- Location: Radio City Music Hall, New York City
- Hosted by: Rosie O'Donnell
- Most wins: The Lion King (6)
- Most nominations: Ragtime (13)

Television/radio coverage
- Network: CBS

The 52nd Annual Tony Awards ceremony was held on June 7, 1998, at Radio City Music Hall and was broadcast by CBS television. A documentaries segment was telecast on PBS television. The ceremony was hosted by Rosie O'Donnell, who hosted a total of three times (1997, 1998, and 2000).

This ceremony is notable for its Best Direction of a Play and Best Direction of a Musical winners both being female, the first time a female has won either award. The writer of the Best Play winner was also female, the second female winner of the award.

Ragtime had 13 nominations, the most of the night, and Ragtime, The Beauty Queen of Leenane and Cabaret each won four Tonys.

== Eligibility ==
Shows that opened on Broadway during the 1997–1998 season before April 30, 1998 are eligible.

Original plays

- Art
- The Beauty Queen of Leenane
- Freak
- Golden Child
- The Herbal Bed
- Honour
- Jackie
- The Judas Kiss
- The Old Neighborhood
- Proposals

Original musicals

- The Capeman
- Forever Tango
- High Society
- The Lion King
- Ragtime
- The Scarlet Pimpernel
- Side Show
- Street Corner Symphony
- Triumph of Love

Play revivals

- Ah, Wilderness!
- The Chairs
- The Cherry Orchard
- The Deep Blue Sea
- The Diary of Anne Frank
- Ivanov
- The Sunshine Boys
- A View from the Bridge
- Wait Until Dark

Musical revivals

- Cabaret
- 1776
- The Sound of Music

== The ceremony ==
The opening number was "Broadway Divas", with Rosie O'Donnell and the Chicago dancers introducing: Patti LuPone ("Don't Cry for Me Argentina" from Evita); Jennifer Holliday ("And I Am Telling You I'm Not Going" from Dreamgirls); and Betty Buckley ("Memory" from Cats).

Musicals represented:

- Ragtime ("Ragtime" – Marin Mazzie, Audra McDonald and Company)
- The Sound of Music ("Wedding"/"Do-Re-Mi"/"The Sound of Music" Finale – Rebecca Luker and Company)
- 1776 ("Sit Down, John" – Richard Poe and Company)
- The Lion King ("Circle of Life" – Tsidii Le Loka and Company)
- Cabaret ("Willkommen" – Alan Cumming and Company)
- Side Show ("I Will Never Leave You" – Alice Ripley and Emily Skinner)
- The Scarlet Pimpernel ("Into the Fire" – Douglas Sills and Company)

== Winners and nominees ==
Winners are in bold

Best Play	Best Musical
**Art – Yasmina Reza**; The Beauty Queen of Leenane – Martin McDonagh; Freak – John Leguizamo; Golden Child – David Henry Hwang	**The Lion King**; Ragtime; Side Show; The Scarlet Pimpernel
Best Revival of a Play	Best Revival of a Musical
**A View from the Bridge**; Ah, Wilderness!; The Chairs; The Diary of Anne Frank	**Cabaret**; 1776; The Sound of Music
Best Performance by a Leading Actor in a Play	Best Performance by a Leading Actress in a Play
**Anthony LaPaglia – A View from the Bridge as Eddie**; Richard Briers – The Chairs as Old Man; John Leguizamo – Freak as Himself; Alfred Molina – Art as Yvan	**Marie Mullen – The Beauty Queen of Leenane as Maureen Folan**; Jane Alexander – Honour as Honor; Allison Janney – A View from the Bridge as Beatrice Carbone; Geraldine McEwan – The Chairs as Old Woman
Best Performance by a Leading Actor in a Musical	Best Performance by a Leading Actress in a Musical
**Alan Cumming – Cabaret as The Master of Ceremonies**; Peter Friedman – Ragtime as Tateh; Brian Stokes Mitchell – Ragtime as Coalhouse Walker, Jr.; Douglas Sills – The Scarlet Pimpernel as Percy Blakeney	**Natasha Richardson – Cabaret as Sally Bowles**; Betty Buckley – Triumph of Love as Hesione; Marin Mazzie – Ragtime as Mother; Alice Ripley and Emily Skinner – Side Show as Violet and Daisy Hilton
Best Performance by a Featured Actor in a Play	Best Performance by a Featured Actress in a Play
**Tom Murphy – The Beauty Queen of Leenane as Ray Dooley**; Brían F. O'Byrne – The Beauty Queen of Leenane as Pato Dooley; Sam Trammell – Ah, Wilderness! as Richard Miller; Max Wright – Ivanov as Pavel Lebedev	**Anna Manahan – The Beauty Queen of Leenane as Mag Folan**; Enid Graham – Honour as Sophie; Linda Lavin – The Diary of Anne Frank as Mrs. Van Daan; Julyana Soelistyo – Golden Child as Eng Ahn
Best Performance by a Featured Actor in a Musical	Best Performance by a Featured Actress in a Musical
**Ron Rifkin – Cabaret as Herr Schultz**; Gregg Edelman – 1776 as Edward Rutledge; John McMartin – High Society as Uncle Willie; Samuel E. Wright – The Lion King as Mufasa	**Audra McDonald – Ragtime as Sarah**; Anna Kendrick – High Society as Dinah Lord; Tsidii Le Loka – The Lion King as Rafiki; Mary Louise Wilson – Cabaret as Fraulein Schneider
Best Book of a Musical	Best Original Score (Music and/or Lyrics) Written for the Theatre
**Terrence McNally – Ragtime**; Bill Russell – Side Show; Roger Allers and Irene Mecchi – The Lion King; Nan Knighton – The Scarlet Pimpernel	**Ragtime – Stephen Flaherty (music) and Lynn Ahrens (lyrics)**; Side Show – Henry Krieger (music) and Bill Russell (lyrics); The Capeman – Paul Simon (music) and Derek Walcott (lyrics); The Lion King – Elton John, Tim Rice, Lebo M, Mark Mancina, Jay Rifkin, Julie Taymor and Hans Zimmer (music and lyrics)
Best Scenic Design	Best Costume Design
**Richard Hudson – The Lion King**; Bob Crowley – The Capeman; Eugene Lee – Ragtime; Brothers Quay – The Chairs	**Julie Taymor – The Lion King**; William Ivey Long – Cabaret; Santo Loquasto – Ragtime; Martin Pakledinaz – Golden Child
Best Lighting Design	Best Orchestrations
**Donald Holder – The Lion King**; Paul Anderson – The Chairs; Peggy Eisenhauer and Mike Baldassari – Cabaret; Jules Fisher and Peggy Eisenhauer – Ragtime	**William David Brohn – Ragtime**; Robert Elhai, David Metzger and Bruce Fowler – The Lion King; Michael Gibson – Cabaret; Stanley Silverman – The Capeman
Best Direction of a Play	Best Direction of a Musical
**Garry Hynes – The Beauty Queen of Leenane**; Michael Mayer – A View from the Bridge; Simon McBurney – The Chairs; Matthew Warchus – Art	**Julie Taymor – The Lion King**; Scott Ellis – 1776; Frank Galati – Ragtime; Sam Mendes with Rob Marshall – Cabaret
Best Choreography
**Garth Fagan – The Lion King**; Graciela Daniele – Ragtime; Forever Tango Dancers – Forever Tango; Rob Marshall – Cabaret

== Special awards ==
- Regional Theater Tony Award
  - Denver Center Theatre Company
- Lifetime Achievement in the Theatre
  - Ben Edwards
  - Edward E. Colton
- Tony Honor Winner
  - The International Theatre Institute of the United States

=== Multiple nominations and awards ===
These productions had multiple nominations:

- 13 nominations: Ragtime
- 11 nominations: The Lion King
- 10 nominations: Cabaret
- 6 nominations: The Beauty Queen of Leenane and The Chairs
- 4 nominations: Side Show and A View from the Bridge
- 3 nominations: Art, The Capeman, Golden Child, The Scarlet Pimpernel and 1776
- 2 nominations: Ah, Wilderness!, The Diary of Anne Frank, Freak, High Society and Honour

The following productions received multiple awards.

- 6 wins: The Lion King
- 4 wins: The Beauty Queen of Leenane, Cabaret and Ragtime
- 2 wins: A View from the Bridge

== See also ==
- Drama Desk Awards
- 1998 Laurence Olivier Awards – equivalent awards for West End theatre productions
- Obie Award
- New York Drama Critics' Circle
- Theatre World Award
- Lucille Lortel Awards
