= Tom Murphy (actor) =

Irish theatre and film actor (1968–2007)

- Born: Tom Jordan Murphy; 15 January 1968; Salisbury, Rhodesia (now Harare, Zimbabwe)
- Died: 6 October 2007 (aged 39); Dublin, Ireland
- Occupation: Actor
- Years active: 1980–2007

Tom Jordan Murphy (15 January 1968 – 6 October 2007) was an Irish theatre and film actor best known for his 1998 Tony Award winning performance in The Beauty Queen of Leenane.

== Career ==
In 1996, Murphy created the role of Ray Dooley in The Beauty Queen of Leenane. This production started life at the Town Hall Theatre, Galway, directed by Garry Hynes and presented in association with the Druid Theatre Company. It also played at Dublin's Gaiety Theatre and in London's West End. In 1998, the play transferred to off-Broadway and later made its Broadway debut at the Walter Kerr Theater. Nominated for six Tony Awards in total, the production won four including the Best Featured Actor in a Play award for Murphy. New York Times theater critic, Ben Brantley, praised Murphy for his role in the play at the time, "Mr. Murphy offers comic relief without ever presenting it as such...His, more than any other character, must embody the provincial society beyond the women's home, and Ray's irritable restlessness is eloquent on the subject".

Murphy made his professional acting debut playing the Artful Dodger in Noel Pearson's production of Oliver! in 1980 aged 12. During his career he performed in theatres all over Ireland and the UK including the Abbey Theatre, the Gate Theatre and Royal Court Theatre in London (in Shining City by Conor McPherson). Murphy made his feature film breakthrough with 2004's Adam & Paul, co-starring (and written by) Mark O'Halloran, in which he played a Dublin drug addict. Variety, which reviewed the movie, wrote that Murphy's performance "steals the show."

Murphy was the former partner of Mark O'Halloran, the writer and co-star in Adam and Paul.

Murphy also appeared in a number of other Irish films, including Intermission, Michael Collins, The General and Man About Dog. He also played the part of Seamie in the popular RTÉ television drama series Pure Mule.

== Death ==
Murphy died in a Dublin hospital following treatment for lymphatic cancer on 6 October 2007. He was 39 years old. Audiences all over Dublin the same day (during the Dublin Theatre Festival) gave Murphy a standing ovation following the announcement of his death.

== Filmography ==
Year	Title	Role	Notes
1992	In Till You Die	Fireman 1	
1996	Michael Collins	Vinny Byrne	
1998	The General	Willie Byrne	
2002	The Abduction Club	Knox	
2002	Boxed	Father Brendan	
2002	In America	Actor in Queue	
2003	Mystics	Denis	
2003	Intermission	Brian - Video Store Manager	
2004	Adam & Paul	Paul	
2004	Man About Dog	Cerebral Paulsy	
2006	Small Engine Repair	Christy	
2007	48 Angels	Stevie	
