= Galway Girl =

Galway Girl may refer to:

- "Galway Girl" (Steve Earle song), 2000
- "Galway Girl" (Ed Sheeran song), 2017
- A Galway Girl, 1979 play by Geraldine Aron
