= Brillantissime =

- Film poster
- Directed by: Michèle Laroque
- Screenplay by: Marie Leconte
- Story by: Michèle Laroque; Benjamin Morgaine; Lionel Dutemple
- Based on: My Brilliant Divorce by Geraldine Aron
- Produced by: Maxime Delauney; Romain Rousseau
- Starring: Michèle Laroque; Kad Merad
- Cinematography: Kika Ungaro
- Edited by: Reynald Bertrand
- Music by: Alex Beaupain
- Production companies: Nolita Cinéma; Princesse Béli; Umedia
- Distributed by: Studio Canal (France)
- Release date: 17 January 2018
- Country: France
- Language: French
- Budget: $6.8 million
- Box office: $5.1 million

Brillantissime is a French comedy film directed by Michèle Laroque and based on the play My Brilliant Divorce by Geraldine Aron. It was released in France on 17 January 2018.

== Cast ==
- Michèle Laroque as Angela
- Kad Merad as Doctor Steinman
- Françoise Fabian as Claire
- Gérard Darmon as Georges
- Rossy de Palma as Charline
- Pascal Elbé as Max
- Oriane Deschamps as Léa
- Marthe Villalonga as Bridge player #1
- Michèle Moretti as Bridge player #2
- Doïna Laroque as Bridge player #3
- Pierre Palmade
- Nadège Beausson-Diagne
- Michaël Youn as Ben
- Jean Benguigui as The butcher
- Moussa Maaskri as The seller
- Philippe Lacheau
- Élodie Fontan
- Tarek Boudali
- Julien Arruti
- Charlie Dupont
- Julia Vignali
- Emy as XXELLE, the dog

== Production ==
The film was produced thanks to donations on touscoprod.com. The shooting of the film began on March 20 and ended in May 2017 in Nice.
