= The Cripple of Inishmaan =

Play written of Martin McDonagh

- Methuen cover
- Original language: English
- Written by: Martin McDonagh
- Characters: "Cripple" Billy Claven; Kate Osbourne; Babbybobby; Helen McCormick; Eileen Osbourne; Doctor McSharry; Bartley McCormick; Johnnypateenmike; Mammy
- Subject: disability, cruelty, Hollywood
- Genre: Black comedy
- Setting: Inishmaan, 1934

Premiere
- Date: 12 December 1996
- Place: Royal National Theatre, London

The Cripple of Inishmaan is a dark comedy by Martin McDonagh who links the story to the real life filming of the documentary Man of Aran.

The play is set on the small Aran Islands community of Inishmaan (Inis Meáin) off the Western Coast of Ireland in 1934, where the inhabitants are excited to learn of a Hollywood film crew's arrival in neighbouring Inishmore (Inis Mór) to make a documentary about life on the islands. "Cripple" Billy Claven, eager to escape the gossip, poverty and boredom of Inishmaan, vies for a part in the film, and to everyone's surprise, the orphan and outcast gets his chance...or so some believe.

== Synopsis ==
"Cripple" Billy Claven is a disabled orphan living with his "aunts" Kate and Eileen Osbourne on the Irish island of Inishmaan. He is regularly ridiculed by the locals for his condition and odd habits, in particular his crush Helen, and is the subject of a rumor of his parents. His adoptive aunts comment on his looks and behaviour, but it is strongly implied they care about him and love him. While the townsfolk ridicule him and often behave cruelly towards him, they are not all without sympathy, though it is often well-hidden.

One day, Billy learns from Johnnypatteenmike, the local gossiper, that the American filmmaker Robert Flaherty is on a neighboring island filming a documentary about life on the local islands (the 1934 Irish fictional documentary-ethnofiction film Man of Aran). When he learns the Babbybobby Bennet will be transporting Helen and her brother Bartley to Inishmoore, Billy goes to plead with Babbybobby to take him as well. Babbybobby initially refuses, but Billy shows him a letter from Dr. McSharry, who is treating him for his various health problems, which states that he has contracted tuberculosis and has about three months to live. As Babbybobby's wife Annie died of the same illness, he agrees to take Billy on as a passenger. Johnnypateenmike overhears their conversation and demands to see the letter, threatening Babbybobby with divulging his secrets – that he kissed a green-toothed crippled girl in Antrim – to the community. Babbybobby loses his temper and throws stones at his head until Johnnypateenmike promises not to tell anyone what he had heard. The next day, Babbybobby takes Helen, Bartley, and Billy to see the film set. He returns several days later with Helen and Bartley only, informing Billy's aunts that Billy was taken to America for a screen test for a movie about a crippled boy. He gives them Billy's letter, in which Billy claims that if he does not write, it is only because he is happy and working hard.

A scene of Billy in America plays out, where Billy has quite a long monologue to his long-dead mother, confessing to missing Ireland and getting more and more ill. The scene closes with what looks like Billy dying in the hotel bed.

Time passes and the newly released Man of Aran comes to Inishmaan. Billy's aunts are convinced Billy forgot about them, Kate even goes a bit crazy and starts talking to a rock (something that has happened to her previously). The rest of the community knows of the letter Billy showed Babbybobby and are sure Billy is at least a month dead since four months have now passed. The screening, happening in the church hall, comes, and all the characters except for McSherry go to watch it. During the movie, the characters alternate between mocking the movie as stupid and boring and unwittingly letting some other characters' secrets slip. By the end of the movie, the aunts learn that Billy must be dead by now and sit there in dismay, only to see Billy return from America. Billy explains he made the whole tuberculosis up to convince Babbybobby to take him to Inishmoore. The scene with his monologue was apparently only Billy practicing his lines for the screen test. He tells his aunts he returned because he missed them, but later tells Bartley it was because they did not want him for the movie. Everyone is happy that Billy is back and slowly leaves the scene, until it is just Billy, who is quickly joined with a menacingly silent Babbybobby. He tries to explain the whole deception to him. Babbybobby does not share the sentiment and beats Billy with a pipe.

Billy is being tended to by Dr. McSharry in his aunts' shop. McSharry discovers that Billy does, in fact, have tuberculosis, which Johnnypateenmike overhears but Billy makes him promise he will not tell anyone. Johnypateenmike then tells him what he claims was the real story of Billy's parents' death – they drowned the day they got insured, so that Billy would get money for the treatment he required to live. After Johnnypateenmike goes home (after lying to McSharry that his mother has fallen down the stairs to get the doctor away), Helen comes in to look at Billy's wounds. Billy asks her out and she laughs in his face. Billy leaves the room, despondent, and his aunts emerge, discussing the fact that apparently Johnnypateenmike had lied to Billy – his parents wanted to drown Billy but Johnnypateenmike saved him. As he is about to leave, Helen comes back to tell him she will go out with him the day after tomorrow. Tomorrow is Bartley's birthday, and despite all their rivalry and her cruelty, she got him a telescope, which is something he loves. She kisses Billy – his first kiss – and leaves. As Billy stands there happy, he coughs and looks at his hand, realising it is full of blood.

== Productions ==
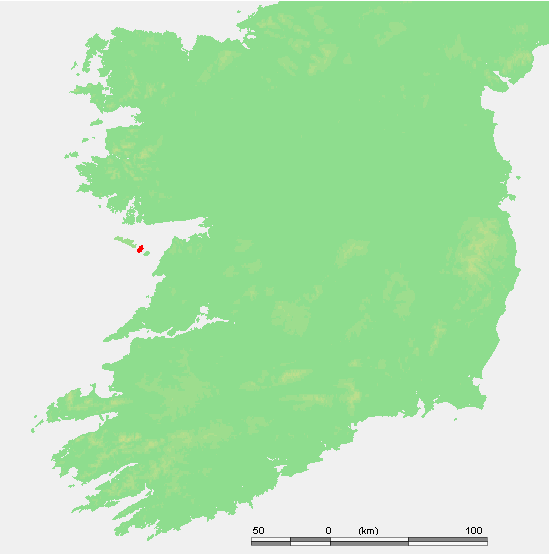
Inishmaan (shaded red) on a map of Ireland.

The Cripple of Inishmaan opened on 12 December 1996 at Royal National Theatre (Cottesloe) in London, a production which was subsequently toured to the 1997 Galway Arts Festival. In April 1998, it opened off-Broadway at the Joseph Papp Public Theater, again with Ruaidhri Conroy in the title role. In the same year, Frederick Koehler played Billy in Los Angeles.

In 2008, the play was produced by the Atlantic Theater Company in conjunction with Druid Theatre Company, opening in Galway, Ireland on 12 September and subsequently off-Broadway on 21 December. Directed by Garry Hynes, the cast featured Kerry Condon, Andrew Connolly, Laurence Kinlan, Dearbhla Molloy, Aaron Monaghan, Marie Mullen, Patricia O'Connell, David Pearse and John C. Vennema.

In 2013, the play returned to the Noël Coward Theatre in London's West End for a sold-out run starring Daniel Radcliffe as Cripple Billy and with Michael Grandage directing. In spring 2014, this production transferred to Broadway at the Cort Theatre for a limited run, with Opening Night on 20 April 2014.

== Critique ==
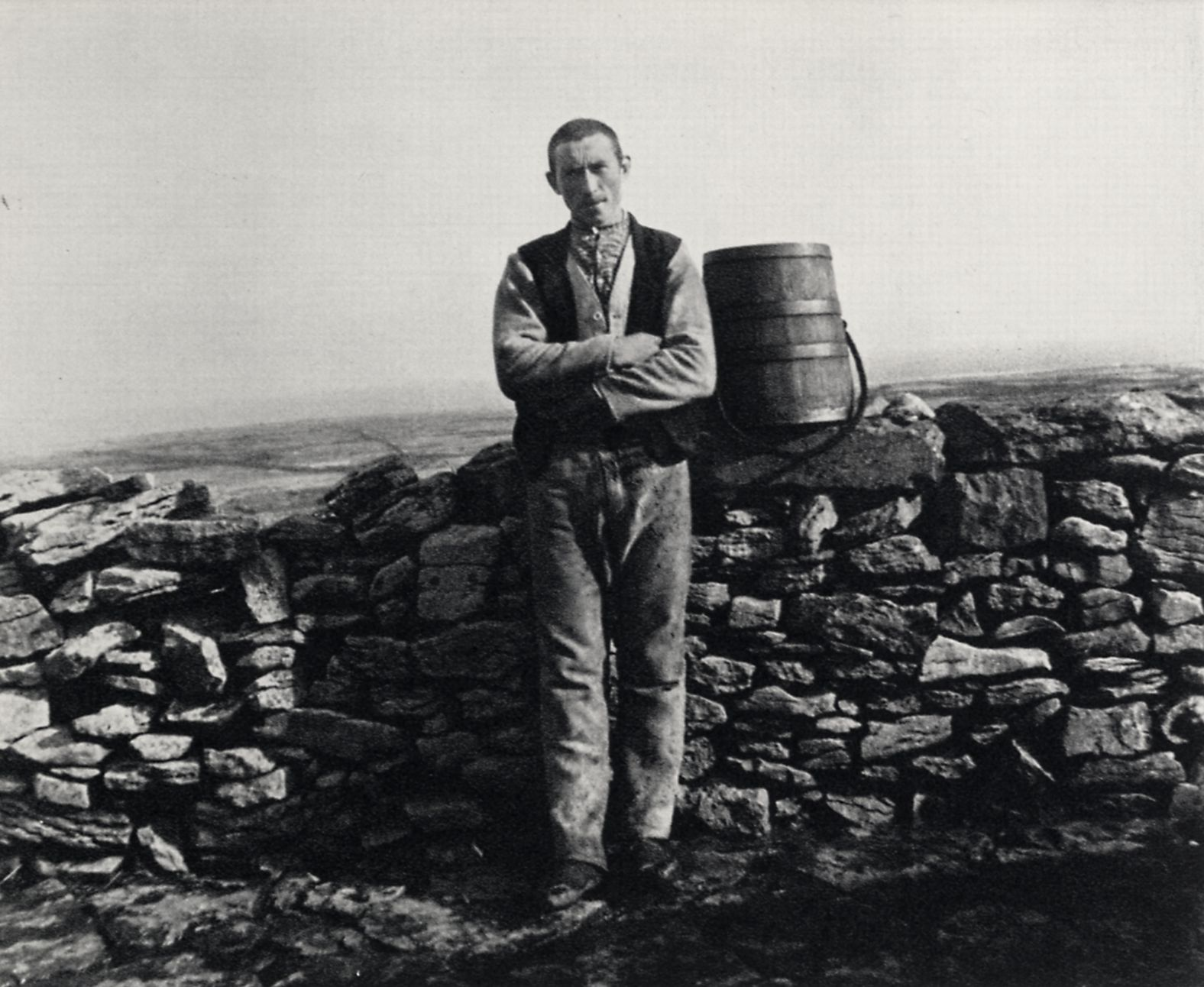
John Millington Synge on Inishmaan, 1898. In The Cripple of Inishmaan, McDonagh critiques the view of islanders given by Synge in plays like Riders to the Sea.

Martin McDonagh said of his play, "I hope someday they’ll be regarded as true Irish stories; I don’t think they are at this minute. It will take a long time for the baggage of me being a Londoner to be in the past."

In an interview, after the play was performed on Inishmaan in 2011, it was reported that "Mr. McDonagh used an unprintable euphemism to explain that it has never been his intent to take the measure of his fellow Irishmen cruelly".

== Characters ==
- Billy Claven, disabled orphan
- Kate Osbourne, Billy's adoptive aunt (known to talk to stones)
- Eileen Osbourne, Billy's other adoptive aunt and Kate's sister (is known to hide candy)
- Johnnypateenmike, the town gossip
- Helen McCormick, a tough girl Billy has had a crush on for some time
- Bartley McCormick, Helen's brother (the village idiot)
- Babbybobby Bennett, a boatman whose wife died of tuberculosis
- Doctor McSharry, the town doctor
- Mammy O'Dougal, Johnny's 90-year-old mother

== Awards and nominations ==
The 2014 Broadway production received six 2014 Tony Award nominations: Best Revival of a Play, Best Performance by an Actress in a Featured Role in a Play (Sarah Greene), Best Scenic Design of a Play (Christopher Oram), Best Lighting Design of a Play (Paule Constable), Best Sound Design of a Play (Alex Baranowski) and Best Direction of a Play (Michael Grandage).

== Book ==
- McDonagh, Martin. The Cripple of Inishmaan. Methuen Modern Plays. 1997. (Hardcover) ISBN 0-413-71590-6
- McDonagh, Martin. The Cripple of Inishmaan. Vintage International. 1998. (Paperback) ISBN 0-375-70523-6
