= The Aran Islands (book) =

Early 20th century collection of journal entries about the Aran Islands in Ireland

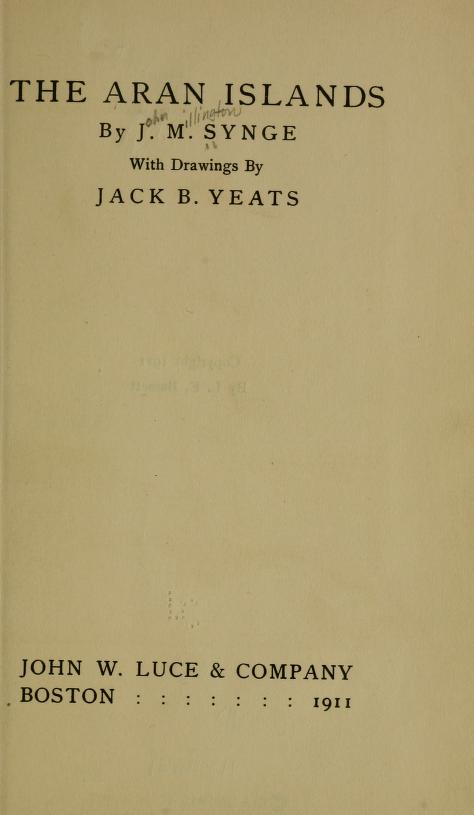
- Title page for a 1911 printing of The Aran Islands
- Author: John Millington Synge
- Illustrator: Jack Butler Yeats
- Language: English
- Subject: Aran Islands
- Set in: 1907

The Aran Islands is a four-part collection of journal entries regarding the geography and people of the Aran Islands. It was completed by Irish writer John Millington Synge in 1901 and first published in 1907. It is based on Synge's multiple travels through the Irish-speaking and predominately rural set of islands off the Western coast of Ireland. The book presents many of the local specificities of the Aran Island people while simultaneously contextualizing the Aran Islands as part of broader European and global commercial networks.

== Summary ==
The Aran Islands is a four-part collection of Synge's account of his interactions with the people, culture, and language of the Aran Islands. Synge first arrives on Inishmore via a steamer from Galway. Notably, regular steamer service between mainland Ireland and the Aran Islands only began in 1891, and then only to Inishmore, since it is the largest of the three. From there, Synge travels to Inishmaan, the middle island, and continues his interactions with the local community. On Inishmaan, Synge continues to develop his Gaelic and notes that he feels as if he is traveling farther from civilization (a concept that pleases him). However, he also notes the connections between the community (and their stories) and mainland Ireland, Europe, and America. Synge then travels to the smallest island, Inishneer, before returning to Inismaan. After this, Synge records his irregular travels between the islands and other parts of Europe.

== Importance ==
Due to the rocky topography and limited natural resources and shipping capabilities of the Aran Islands, they remain largely isolated from mainland Ireland. As such, communities on the Aran Islands developed in specific ways that are reflected in the culture and language of the Aran Islands. Some of these specific traditions have since disappeared or otherwise been changed by the modernization and tourist commodification of the islands but Synge's work has preserved some parts of this way of life.

== Adaptations ==
Playwright Joe O'Byrne adapted Synge's book for the stage in early 2015. The Aran Islands premiered in June 2015 at the Viking Theatre in Dublin, before touring Ireland. It had its U.S. premiere in June 2017 at the Irish Repertory Theatre.
