= The Beauty Queen of Leenane =

1996 Irish comedy by Martin McDonagh

- Original language: English
- Written by: Martin McDonagh
- Characters: Mag Folan; Maureen Folan; Ray Dooley; Pato Dooley
- Subject: a plain and lonely woman in her forties with her first and possibly final chance at love; and her manipulative mother who sets about to derail it
- Genre: Drama
- Setting: Leenane, a village in Connemara, County Galway

Premiere
- Date: 1996
- Place: Galway, Ireland

The Beauty Queen of Leenane is a 1996 dramatic play by Martin McDonagh which was premiered by the Druid Theatre Company in Galway, Ireland. It also enjoyed successful runs at London's West End, Broadway and Off-Broadway.

The original London production was nominated for Best New Play at the 1997 Laurence Olivier Awards, and the 1998 Broadway production was nominated for six Tony Awards, winning four, for Best Leading Actress in a Play (Marie Mullen), Best Featured Actor in a Play (Tom Murphy), Best Featured Actress in a Play (Anna Manahan), and Best Direction of a Play (Garry Hynes).

== Plot synopsis ==
Maureen Folan, a 40-year-old spinster, lives in the Irish village of Leenane, Connemara, in the early 1990s with her 70-year-old mother Mag, for whom she acts as caretaker. While Maureen is out, the Folan home is visited by Ray Dooley, a young man, who invites both women to a farewell party for his visiting American uncle. When it seems Mag is incapable of remembering this message, Ray writes it down for Maureen. As soon as he leaves, Mag destroys the note in the furnace. Upon Maureen's return, she admonishes her mother for depending on her as if she were an invalid; despite her bad back and burnt hand, Maureen thinks Mag is capable of doing more for herself. Maureen has already learnt of the party from Ray, whom she passed on her way in, so she punishes Mag for her dishonesty by forcing her to drink lumpy Complan.

Maureen, a virgin who has only ever kissed two men, buys a new dress and attends the party. She brings Ray's older brother, Pato, home with her. Pato is a construction worker who lives primarily in London, though he is unhappy both there and in Leenane. He reveals that, although he has barely spoken to Maureen in 20 years of acquaintance, he has secretly thought of her as "the beauty queen of Leenane" for a long time. She brings him to her bedroom.

In the morning, Mag empties her bedpan into the kitchen sink, a daily habit that disgusts Maureen. Pato emerges from the bedroom and prepares breakfast for a shocked Mag, revealing that Maureen insisted he not sneak out. Maureen then emerges, dressed only in her underwear, and flaunts her intimacy with Pato in front of Mag. Incensed, Mag accuses Maureen of having deliberately burnt her hand by pouring hot oil over it, and then reveals that it is actually she who is legally responsible for Maureen after having signed her out of an English "loony bin." After Mag goes to find the papers that prove this, Maureen tells Pato that Mag burnt herself trying to cook unsupervised, but she admits that she truly did suffer a nervous breakdown while working as a cleaner in England, 15 years earlier, when she was unable to endure the teasing of her English coworkers. She claims Mag sometimes tries to tell lies about the past, thinking Maureen is unable to discern them from reality. Pato is sympathetic, telling her that his opinion of her is unchanged. However, when he urges her to dress herself for warmth, she becomes insecure about her appearance and throws a tantrum. Mag returns with the documents, but Pato ignores her, departing after telling an upset Maureen that he will write to her.

Some time later, Pato writes from London, telling Maureen that he is going to work for his American uncle in Boston, and he wants Maureen to come with him as soon as she can. The letter also reveals that he was unable to perform sexually when they were together, but he tells her that it was only because he had drunk too much. He also tells her that there will be a going away party for him. He sends the letter to Ray, with explicit instructions to put it directly into Maureen's hands. However, when Ray comes to the house, Maureen is out and Mag persuades him to leave the letter with her, playing on his resentment of Maureen for failing to return his swingball that fell in the Folan yard when he was a child and for snubbing him recently in the street. After Ray leaves, Mag reads and burns the letter.

On the night of Pato's farewell party, Maureen is aware of Pato's plans but assumes he is uninterested in pursuing a relationship. However, she tells Mag that it was she who ended things with him. When she continues to talk about the sexual encounter, Mag teases her and accidentally lets slip that she is aware of Pato's impotence. Seizing on it, Maureen tortures Mag with hot oil until she confesses the letter's existence and contents. Leaving Mag writhing on the floor, Maureen quickly puts on her dress and rushes out to the party.

She returns home after midnight, telling an unmoving Mag that she caught Pato at the train station before he left, and they recommitted themselves to one another. At the end of the scene, Mag slumps to the floor, dead. Maureen has bashed her head in with the poker.

A month later, Mag's funeral is held following an inquest that exonerated Maureen. Ray visits, bringing word from Pato. However, it soon becomes clear that Maureen imagined her reunion with Pato; he actually left by taxi without ever seeing Maureen, and is now engaged to a woman with whom he danced at the party. Maureen asks Ray to send Pato a message, "The beauty queen of Leenane says 'Goodbye.'" Ray leaves after discovering and seizing his lost swingball. Left alone in the house, Maureen puts on Mag's sweater, sits in her rocking chair, and adopts her mannerisms.

== Productions ==
=== Production history ===
The play received its world premiere when the Druid Theatre Company opened the production at the Town Hall Theatre, Galway on 1 February 1996. It then toured Ireland, stopping off in Longford, Kilkenny and Limerick. It transferred to London's West End, where it opened at the Royal Court Theatre on 29 February 1996.

The Druid production then returned to Ireland to embark on an extensive national tour, playing in Galway, County Cork, County Kerry, Limerick, County Fermanagh, County Donegal and Derry amongst others. The play returned to London where it was revived at the Duke of York's Theatre on 29 November 1996 for several months.

The play was produced as part of Druid's Leenane Trilogy (which includes two other plays by Martin McDonagh) in 1997 where it played as part of another Irish and UK Tour, which included stops at the Olympia Theatre, Dublin and the Royal Court Theatre in London (July to September 1997) again.

The play received its American premiere opening Off-Broadway on 11 February 1998, presented by the Atlantic Theatre Company at the Linda Gross Theater.

It transferred to the Walter Kerr Theatre on Broadway where it opened on 23 April 1998. It received six nominations at the 52nd Tony Awards and won four for: Best Supporting Actor (Tom Murphy); Best Actress (Marie Mullen); Best Supporting Actress (Anna Manahan); and Best Director (Garry Hynes), the first female recipient of a Tony Award for directing a play.

The play was produced in Australia in 1998 and again in 1999. The 1999 production was a tour by the Royal Court Theatre Company, appearing at the Adelaide Festival Centre (May – June 1999) and Wharf 1 (July 1999) and directed by Garry Hynes. The production returned to Ireland in 2000 as part of a final national tour.

A 2001 adaptation was undertaken by The Tron Theatre in Glasgow, starring Anne Marie Timoney as Maureen and directed by Iain Heggie.

=== 2010 London revival ===
The play was revived in July 2010 at the Young Vic Theatre in the West End, starring Irish actress Rosaleen Linehan. The production transferred to Dublin's Gaiety Theatre where Linehan reprised her role opposite Derbhle Crotty. It then returned to the Young Vic for another run, closing in September 2011.

=== 2016–2017 revival ===
The Druid Theatre Company presented a revival in 2016–2017. Directed by Garry Hynes, the cast stars Marie Mullen as Mag, Aisling O'Sullivan as Maureen, Aaron Monaghan as Ray and Marty Rea as Pato. The production started in Ireland in Galway at the Town Hall Theatre in September 2016, and then toured to The Everyman, Cork; the Lime Tree Theatre, Limerick; and the Gaiety Theatre, Dublin. The play then toured in the US starting in November 2016. The play ran at the Mark Taper Forum, Los Angeles, California in November 2016. The play opened at the Brooklyn Academy of Music (New York City), running from 11 January 2017 to 5 February. The production returned to Ireland, playing at The Gaiety Theatre; the original run was planned from 28 March to 15 April 2017, but the run was extended to seven months "due to phenomenal demand".

== Awards and nominations ==
=== 1997 Laurence Olivier Awards ===
- Best New Play (nomination)

=== 1998 Tony Awards ===
- Best Play (nomination)
- Best Leading Actress in a Play – Marie Mullen (winner)
- Best Featured Actor in a Play – Tom Murphy (winner)
- Best Featured Actor in a Play – Brían F. O'Byrne (nomination)
- Best Featured Actress in a Play – Anna Manahan (winner)
- Best Direction of a Play – Garry Hynes (winner)

=== 1998 Drama Desk Awards ===
- Outstanding Play (winner)
- Outstanding Actress in a Play – Marie Mullen (nomination)

=== Other awards ===
- 1998 Drama League Award for Best Play (winner)
- 1998 Lucille Lortel Award for Outstanding Play (winner)
- 1998 Lucille Lortel Award for Outstanding Director (winner)
- 1998 Outer Critics Circle Award Best Broadway Play (winner)
- 1998 Drama Critics Circle Award (nomination)
