= Pure Mule =

- Poster
- Genre: Drama
- Developed by: Accomplice Television
- Written by: Eugene O'Brien
- Directed by: Charlie McCarthy; Declan Recks
- Starring: Dawn Bradfield; Joanne Crawford; Luke Griffen; Mark Huberman; Simone Kirby; Garret Lombard; Gary Lydon; Charlene McKenna; Tom Murphy; Eileen Walsh; Dermot Ward
- Country of origin: Ireland
- Original language: English
- No. of series: 2
- No. of episodes: 8

Production
- Producers: David Collins; Ed Guiney
- Cinematography: Owen McPolin
- Editor: Gareth Young
- Camera setup: Single-camera
- Running time: 50 minutes per episode

Original release
- Network: RTÉ Two
- Release: 6 September 2005 – 6 September 2009

Pure Mule is an Irish six-part drama mini-series aimed at a young audience and broadcast on RTÉ Two as part of RTÉ's autumn schedule in 2005, shot and screened in 2004–2005 in County Offaly.

Towns featured in the series include Banagher, Birr and Tullamore, all in County Offaly. It intended to offer an "insight into modern day rural Ireland". The original series was rebroadcast on RTÉ beginning 26 July 2009 at 22:50. The show was expected to return to RTÉ Two for two special episodes after three years in the wilderness as part of the autumn 2009 television season, however RTÉ ran the two part special on RTÉ One. The second edition is called Pure Mule: The Last Weekend. "Pure Mule" is a phrase in the Offaly dialect which may mean "really good" or "lousy", depending on the intonation.

Pure Mule won five Irish Film and Television Awards (IFTAs) and was nominated for seven in total. It is still referenced in the Irish media years after its original broadcast. The show is credited with progressing the careers of actors such as Simone Kirby, Garrett Lombard and Charlene McKenna, the last of whom became a household name and face in Ireland following its success. McKenna said the show was "very dark [...] but it has a fun side too". Lombard attributed its success to its realism and bravery, its wide range of characters from all backgrounds and its use of relevant themes.

== Original series (2004–2005) ==
Pure Mule was written as a six-part series aimed at a young audience by the playwright Eugene O'Brien and produced by Accomplice Television, the television arm of Element Films. It was promoted as being part of the new "edgier" and "riskier" RTÉ Two schedule, which also featured a gay-themed night following its relaunch from Network 2 in 2004. The original Pure Mule featured a cast which included Tom Murphy, Garret Lombard, Luke Griffen, Gary Lydon, Eileen Walsh, Simone Kirby, Joanne Crawford, Dawn Bradfield and Charlene McKenna. It was shot on high-definition camera. The setting is a nameless market town in county Offaly in the Irish midlands. The drama was part of a boost in spending of 25% on independent Irish television productions in 2004.

Each episode follows the journey of one character over a weekend from Friday until Monday. Themes covered included binge drunkenness and casual sexual intercourse. The first episode featured Shamie (played by Tom Murphy), and follows his birthday boozing and his struggle to win the affections of a Dublin girl against his younger brother, Scobie (played by Garrett Lombard). Frustrated and embarrassed by his loss, he instead engages in an attempt to win another girl instead.

Another episode featured a famous threesome involving Geraldine (played by Simone Kirby).

== Cast and crew ==
Actor	Role
Mark Huberman	Conor
Simone Kirby	Geraldine
Garrett Lombard	Scobie
Gary Lydon	Bomber
Charlene McKenna	Jennifer
Tom Murphy	Shamie
Eileen Walsh	Therese
Dermot Ward	Niall Scully

Other actors who had roles in Pure Mule included Brian Doherty, Pádraic Delaney, Ian McElhinney, Anthony Brophy, and Seán McGinley.

Crew	Name
Writer	Eugene O'Brien
Director	Declan Recks, Charlie McCarthy
Producer	David Collins, Ed Guiney
Director of photography	Owen McPolin
Production designer	John Hand
Costume designer	Kathy Strachen
Editor	Gareth Young
Location sound	Philippe Faujas
Composers	Stephen Rennicks, Hugh Drumm

== Reception ==
"It is really weird being recognised in the street. I thought that maybe at home in Monaghan people would recognise me but it’s the same down here in Galway or Dublin or wherever, really weird".

— Charlene McKenna on her elevation to stardom as a result of her role in Pure Mule.

Pure Mule received a favourable reaction from the critics, with some praising it for being the first RTÉ drama of the decade to portray issues such as Alzheimer's disease though locals said it portrayed midlanders in a bad light. Tom Parlon, a TD, spoke of the upset Pure Mule's themes of ecstasy and other issues caused to "a lot of people" in his constituency of Laois–Offaly, saying:

It does make for uncomfortable viewing especially for someone like me whose has lived all their life in rural Ireland. But let's not be naive here. I believe the programme has also performed a valuable service by highlighting in stark and uncomfortable terms the challenges facing rural Ireland today in particular increased drug use amongst our young population. [...] Pure Mule has shown to all who watch it that young people in every corner of this country are experimenting with and using drugs on a large scale. Teenage sex and sexual promiscuity are other uncomfortable issues that are dealt with. It is fiction but it has also struck a raw nerve because it is telling an unpalatable truth. As a rural TD and as a parent, I believe what we are facing is a ticking time bomb in rural Ireland, where our young people feel increasingly dislocated from their community, where a lack of recreational and social outlets is fuelling the increase in drink and drug use. The last 20 years has brought unprecedented economic growth and social change across Ireland. What we must now do is face up to the social challenges.

Pure Mule was seen as a nod to Bracken and Deadwood, with The Sunday Times praising it for its "impressively lyrical yet largely authentic dialogue" but remaining sceptical of O'Brien's "lapses into ludicrously Oirish speechifying, replete with more hooting "ouls" than a forest park".

Garrett Lombard used to be greeted by cheers each time he passed a building site due to his character, Scobie, being portrayed as an authentic hero by many. Lombard described him as "a typical Irish male, who liked his drinking and carousing and having a good time".

== Awards ==
The original Pure Mule won five Irish Film and Television Awards (IFTAs) from seven nominations on 6 November 2005.

Tom Murphy won in the category of Best Television Actor, whilst Dawn Bradfield won in the category of Best Television Actress. Eileen Walsh won in the category of Best Supporting Actress on Television. Declan Recks won in the category of Best Director Television. The other award win for the show on the night was in the category of Best Sound for Television or Film.

The other two nominations were Garrett Lombard in the category of Best Supporting Actor on Television and director Charlie McCarthy in the same category as Recks.

The award ceremony was broadcast on RTÉ One.

Year	Nominee / work	Award	Result
2006	Tom Murphy	Best Television Actor	Won
2006	Dawn Bradfield	Best Television Actress	Won
2006	Eileen Walsh	Best Supporting Actress on Television	Won
2006	Declan Recks	Best Director Television	Won
2006	Philippe Faujas	Best Sound for Television or Film	Won
2006	Garrett Lombard	Best Supporting Actor on Television	Nominated
2006	Charlie McCarthy	Best Director Television	Nominated

== Pure Mule: The Last Weekend ==
Pure Mule: The Last Weekend was shot in Birr, County Offaly and the surrounding areas such as Banagher and Shannonbridge. It is again directed by Declan Recks and is again produced by Accomplice Television. The show is written by Eugene O'Brien. The series, which wrapped before the end of July 2009, was shot using the RED high end digital camera format.

The plot involves the imminent departure of Scobie (played by Lombard) to Australia. Jennifer (played by McKenna) returns to attend the funeral of a family member. An economic recession has arrived, reflecting the reality of life in Ireland in 2009.

Tom Murphy, the IFTA award-winning actor of the original series, died in 2007. Well-recognised chimney stacks on the banks of the River Shannon in Shannonbridge which featured in the original series were demolished in July 2009. The towers "featured prominently in the background" of the show.

== Complete Season DVD release ==
The box set Pure Mule: The Complete Series was released on DVD by Element Pictures Distribution on 13 November 2009.
