= The Sanctuary Lamp =

Irish play

The Sanctuary Lamp is a play by Irish playwright Tom Murphy written in 1975 but revised for subsequent productions. When premiered at the Abbey Theatre in Dublin its anti-Catholic stance caused enormous controversy with its author denounced in pulpits up and down the country. Defenders included the then President of Ireland who argued that the play was, along with The Playboy of the Western World and Juno and the Paycock, one of the greatest of Irish dramas.

The trauma of the play's rejection caused Murphy to withdraw from playwriting altogether for a few years. When it was revived in a substantially rewritten version at the Abbey in 2001 and then at the Royal Exchange Theatre, Manchester in 2003 it was re-evaluated as one of Murphy's best plays and was enormously successful with audiences. A production of The Sanctuary Lamp received its London premiere at the Arcola Theatre in Dalston, between 10 March - 3 April 2010 in a production directed by Tom Murphy himself.

== The Play - 1975 and post-1975 versions ==
The Sanctuary Lamp centres on four central characters - Harry Stone, a Jewish strongman who, having been sacked from the circus, has gone freelance, Francisco, the Irish juggler who was sacked with him, Maudie, a young girl and the Monsignor who presides over the Church in which Harry takes refuge.

In the original 1975 version the play unfolds over three acts. The first begins outside the Monsignor's church with Harry begging before hiding inside when Francisco appears, searching for him. As Harry finds himself listening to the Monsignor's sermon, Francisco makes an exhibition of himself, hurling abuse at the Catholic faith. After he is ejected, Harry and the Monsignor meet and, in an act of kindness towards a man in need, the Monsignor offers Harry the job of caretaker in the church. This Act is almost entirely omitted in the post-1975 version which begins with Harry's meeting with the Monsignor.

Both versions share the action of the remaining two acts. As Harry shelters in the church it emerges he has not only been sacked from the circus but has walked out on his troupe of freelancers which includes Francisco, Olga, his wife and a dwarf called Samuel. Harry has rejected them because of an affair Francisco has had with Olga.

In the church Harry befriends a waif-like young girl, Maudie, who is also sheltering in the church in the belief that somehow she will find forgiveness for some of the terrible things that have happened to her. Harry undertakes to protect Maudie - largely because she reminds him of his own daughter, Teresa, who died of consumption. Their plans are ruined when Francisco appears in search of his old friend. As the two men confront each other lies and self-deceits are stripped away and all go through their own dark night of the soul. But, having purged themselves of the past, the three resolve to go back into the world the next day, somehow reconciled and able to find their own private visions of redemption.

== Themes ==
The Sanctuary Lamp explores major themes of redemption, love, guilt, spirituality and the existence - or non-existence - of God. Its portrait of the struggle of down-and-outs looking to find some kind of meaning to their lives is reminiscent of Maxim Gorki's The Lower Depths. In common with much of Murphy's work the play deals with the battle against nihilism and finds a form of redemption and hope in mankind's ability to show compassion, love and find an individual spirituality. The Lamp itself becomes an image of the light of the human soul unattached to dogma or religion.

Also in common with Murphy's other plays it mixes realism with an elegiac lyricism, the stark reality of the characters' suffering and destitution contrasting with the poetic aspiration of their souls. A twenty-minute speech delivered by Harry alone to the Lamp where he thinks God resides is a particularly masterful example of this.

== See also ==
- Tom Murphy
- Catholicism
- Christianity
- Judaism
