= Tom Murphy (playwright) =

Irish dramatist (1935–2018)

- Born: 23 February 1935; Tuam, County Galway, Ireland
- Died: 15 May 2018 (aged 83)
- Writing career
- Notable works: A Whistle in the Dark, The Sanctuary Lamp, Famine, The Gigli Concert, Conversations on a Homecoming
- Notable awards: Saoi of the Aosdána

Tom Murphy (23 February 1935 – 15 May 2018) was an Irish dramatist who worked closely with the Abbey Theatre in Dublin and with Druid Theatre, Galway. He was born in County Galway, Ireland and later lived in Dublin.

Murphy's first successful play, A Whistle in the Dark, was performed at the Theatre Royal Stratford East in London in 1961 and caused considerable controversy both there and in Dublin when it was later given its Irish premiere at the Abbey having initially been rejected by its artistic director.

== Life ==
Murphy was born in Tuam, County Galway, the youngest of ten children. His elder siblings gradually emigrated to Birmingham until he was left alone with his mother. He played at centre half back for the Galway Vocational Schools Gaelic football team in the early 1950s. He attended Archbishop McHale College in Tuam, was an apprentice at the Tuam Sugar Factory and later became a metalwork teacher at Archbishop McHale College.

He began writing in the late 1950s: "In 1958, my best friend said to me, why don't we write a play? I didn't think it was an unusual question, because in 1958 everyone in Ireland was writing a play". His second play, A Whistle in the Dark, was written in his Tuam kitchen on his free Friday and Saturday nights. It was entered into a competition for amateur plays, which it won, and was eventually produced in London in 1961, having been rejected by the Abbey Theatre.

Though Murphy was religious as a boy, his 1975 play The Sanctuary Lamp was produced in the Abbey Theatre and received a hostile reception due to its anti-Catholic nature, with theatregoers walking out and much negative criticism in the media. After this controversy, Murphy worked as a farmer for some years.

Murphy died on 15 May 2018. He is survived by his wife, actress Jane Brennan, and his three children by his first wife Mary and a granddaughter. The President of Ireland Michael D. Higgins said: "The importance of Tom Murphy’s contribution to Irish theatre is immeasurable and outstanding. We have had no greater use of language for the stage than in the body of work produced by Tom Murphy since his earliest work in the 1960s."

== Writing career ==
Considered by many to be one of Ireland's greatest playwrights, Tom Murphy was honoured by the Abbey Theatre in 2001 by a retrospective season of six of his plays. His plays include the historical epic Famine (1968) which deals with the Great Famine of Ireland between 1846 and spring 1847, the anti-clerical The Sanctuary Lamp (1975), The Gigli Concert (1983) and for many his masterpiece, the lyrical Bailegangaire and the bar-room comedy Conversations on a Homecoming (both 1985).

His work is characterised by a constant experimentation in form and content from the apparently naturalistic A Whistle in the Dark to the surreal The Morning After Optimism and the spectacularly verbal The Gigli Concert. Recurring themes include the search for redemption and hope in a world apparently deserted by God and filled with suffering. Although steeped in the culture and mythology of Ireland, Murphy's work does not trade on familiar clichés of Irish identity, dealing instead with Dostoyevskian themes of violence, nihilism and despair while never losing sight of the presence of laughter, humour and the possibilities of love and transcendence. His works are often described as being filled with rage, with Murphy himself stating "There is a rage in me which I think is a natural thing. It was in me when I was 24 or 25, scribbling with my stub of a pencil. And it's still there in everything I do. Rage not against the unfairness of life – life is of course unfair – but against the inequalities, the arrogance of power."

Younger playwrights whose work shows an indebtedness to him include Conor McPherson, Martin McDonagh and Gary Mitchell. His latest plays include The Wake (1997), The House (2000) and The Alice Trilogy, which premiered in 2005 at the Royal Court Theatre in London with Juliet Stevenson in the eponymous role. In 2006 Murphy directed the Irish premiere of the same play at the Peacock Theatre in Dublin with Jane Brennan in the lead role. In 2009, his play, The Last Days of a Reluctant Tyrant premiered at the Abbey Theatre.

His play The Sanctuary Lamp was performed at the Arcola Theatre in Dalston, London from 10 March to 3 April 2010, directed by Murphy himself.

He wrote one novel, The Seduction of Morality (1994).

== List of works ==
=== Plays ===
- On the Outside (1959)
- A Whistle in the Dark (1961)
- The Orphans (1968)
- A Crucial Week in the Life of a Grocer's Assistant (1969)
- The Morning After Optimism (1971)
- The White House (1971)
- On the Inside (1974)
- The Vicar of Wakefield (1975)
- The Sanctuary Lamp (1975)
- The J Arthur Maginnis Story (1976)
- Famine (1977)
- Epitaph Under Ether (1979)
- The Blue Macushla (1980)
- The Informer (1981)
- The Gigli Concert (1983)
- Conversations on a Homecoming (1985)
- Bailegangaire (1985)
- A Thief of a Christmas (1985)
- Too Late For Logic (1989)
- The Patriot Game (1991)
- She Stoops to Folly (1995)
- The Wake (1997)
- The House (2000)
- The Cherry Orchard (Adaptation; 2004)
- Alice Trilogy (2005)
- The Last Days of a Reluctant Tyrant (2009)
- Brigit (2014)

=== Novel ===
- The Seduction of Morality (1994)
