= The Gigli Concert =

The Gigli Concert is a play by Irish playwright Tom Murphy premiered at the Abbey Theatre, Dublin, in 1983 and widely regarded as his masterpiece.

== Plot ==
The Gigli Concert deals with seven days in the relationship between Dynamatologist JPW King, a quack self-help therapist living in Dublin but born and brought up in England, and the mysterious Irishman, a construction millionaire who asks King to teach him how to sing like the Italian opera singer Beniamino Gigli.

As King finds himself reluctantly drawn into the Irishman's request it becomes clear that his subject is mentally unbalanced but, against all expectations, King finds himself able to heal the Irishman and, in the process, himself. Although he rises to the challenge and, indeed, becomes obsessed with it, the Irishman ends up ending the process, finding himself cured of his mental and emotional malady through King's kindness.

Left alone, and discovering that his lover, Mona, is suffering from cancer, King tries to kill himself but, in a stunning coup de theatre, instead finds himself miraculously able to sing an aria of Gigli himself. The play ends with King waking up after his suicide attempt and realising that the world is somewhere he is willing to fight on in.
