= My Brilliant Divorce =

My Brilliant Divorce is a comedy play by Irish dramatist Geraldine Aron.

== Plot ==
Middle-aged Angela is left and divorced by her husband of many years (nicknamed Roundhead) after he discloses that he has a Mexican lover "Mona the Poser". Angela's adult daughter tells her that she was the only person who didn't know about the affair, which has been going on long-term.

Alone, with only family dog Axal for company, Angela mourns her marriage and learns how to live without her family. Sometimes very depressed and ringing the local helpline, other times resolute and upbeat, Angela goes on holiday solo, rediscovers sex (and sex shops!), visits her doctor for random illnesses she never has, mocks "Roundhead the embellisher" for pretending his penis is a large when it is not even a medium and celebrates Christmas and birthdays by herself.

Finally she takes off on an outward bound holiday which is naturally somewhat ill-advised but begins a relationship with the doctor whom she has seen every week or so since her divorce and who has joined her on the outward-bound excursion.

The play looks at themes such as late in life divorce, middle-aged loneliness, how a person functions once children have left the nest, life experiences and how to cope when the world you have built comes crashing down.

== Productions ==
OnBook Theatre OSO Arts Centre, London

- Directed by Jason Moore, The play premiered 16 May 2023
- Louise Fernandez Falkner Angela Kennedy Lipsky

=== Tjóðpallur Føroya (National Theatre), Faroe Islands ===
- Directed by Durita Sumbarg Poulsen, The play premiered 10 July 2018
- Kristina Sundar Hansen .... Angela Kennedy Lipsky

=== The Phoenix Players Theatre, Nairobi ===
- Directed by Eugene Oyoo, The play premiered 26 October 2012
- Maggy Karanja .... Angela Kennedy Lipsky

=== Amiral Theatre, Athens ===
Pavlakis Theatrical Enterprises

- Directed by George Kimoulis, The play premiered 2 February 2012
- Chrisa Ropa .... Angela Kennedy Lipsky

=== The Apollo Shaftesbury, London ===
- Directed by Garry Hynes. The play premiered 25 February 2003
- Dawn French .... Angela Kennedy Lipsky

=== Druid Theatre, Galway ===
- Directed by Garry Hynes. The play premiered 7 November 2001.
- Glenne Headly .... Angela Kennedy Lipsky

=== Studio DVA divadlo, Prague ===
- Directed by Jan Brichcín and Jana Kališová. The play premiered 23 October 2003.
- Eliška Balzerová .... Angela Kennedy Lipsky

=== Downstage Theatre, Wellington ===
- Directed by Geraldine Brophy. The play premiered 30 May – 28 June 2008.
- Ginette McDonald .... Angela Kennedy Lipsky*

== Film adaptation ==
The play was adapted into a French feature-length film starring and directed by Michèle Laroque, which was released in France on 17 January 2018 under the title Brillantissime.
