= Conversations on a Homecoming =

1985 play by Tom Murphy

Conversations on a Homecoming is a 1985 play by Irish playwright Tom Murphy. Premiered by the Druid Theatre Company, Galway, Ireland in a production directed by Garry Hynes. As one of the great Irish plays set in a pub, its influence can be seen in more recent plays such as The Weir by Conor McPherson.

== Plot ==
The homecoming of the title is that of Michael to his home town in Ireland. Set entirely in a pub where he and his friends used to drink the play unfolds in real time, Murphy showing an extraordinary stage sense for the rhythms of drinking as an evening wears on.

Michael is an actor who has returned to Ireland after emigrating to America to try to make a career. He has returned to see his old friends, Tom, a contemporary of his, and JJ, an inspirational figure from their youth who, in the time of Kennedy's period in the White House, came to the town and became a sort of subversive guru, challenging the Church and urging the young men of the town to aspire to bigger things.

As the play unfolds it emerges that no-one has fulfilled his potential. Michael has failed as an actor and has tried to set himself on fire while in America, JJ is seriously ill and Tom's youthful idealism and intelligence has given way to the savage indignation of a man who feels he has been deserted by his mentor (JJ), his best friend (Michael) his dreams and his life.

As everyone gets progressively drunker truths are told and souls are bared. Michael is shocked by Tom's negativity but when he challenges him to leave Tom makes an excuse for remaining in the town. It emerges that Michael's leaving was the thing which broke Tom's heart the most. At the end of the play Michael leaves the pub and the town, telling JJ's daughter, who seems to represent a kind of hope in the play, to pass on his love to JJ.

== Stage history and themes ==
Conversations on a Homecoming remains one of Murphy's most accessible plays, written in a similar supposedly naturalistic style as his earlier masterpiece A Whistle In the Dark. Hugely well received on its original production which transferred to London after its Irish debut, it has been performed in Belfast and revived at the Abbey since. It still awaits a major revival in the UK.

Brilliantly written, caustic and bleak in places but possessed of a suppressed romanticism and idealism struggling to emerge it evokes the atmosphere of the small-town Irish pub with its apparent bonhomie disguising deep-seated pain and tensions with consummate skill. As with all of Murphy's plays there is immense darkness and moments of nihilism in the writing but ultimately there is an optimism and belief in the human spirit which transcends the suffering of the characters.

In the original production the actors drank real alcohol on stage, the process of buying of rounds, consuming drink and going to the toilet being carefully plotted into the action.
