= Geraldine Aron =

Irish playwright

- Born: 1951 (age 74–75)
- Occupation: Playwright

Geraldine Aron (born 1951) is an Irish playwright. She was born in Galway, Ireland, has lived in Zambia, Zimbabwe and South Africa, and now lives in London.

Aron's first play Bar and Ger was performed at the Space Theatre in Cape Town in 1975 and then won awards and continues to be produced internationally. Aron's one-hander starring Dawn French, My Brilliant Divorce, played at the Apollo Theatre in London's West End and was nominated for the 2004 Laurence Olivier Award for Best Entertainment. Twelve of Aron's plays have been performed on television or radio.

My Brilliant Divorce has since been produced in 28 countries and as of 2024 is enjoying a 20 year record breaking run in Prague.

A French feature-length film, directed by Michèle Laroque, was released in France on 17 January 2018, under the title Brillantissime.

Aron's produced stage plays include Same Old Moon (Geilgud Theatre, Shaftesbury Avenue,) A Galway Girl, The Shrinking of Alby Chapman, Spider, On The Blue Train, Olive and Hilary, The Stanley Parkers, et al. Aron is included in the 1992 Bloomsbury Guide to Women's Literature, and many other anthologies. My Brilliant Divorce appears in Singular Sensations, an American collection of one-person plays.

== Selected works ==
=== Plays with place and date of first production ===
- Bar and Ger, Space Theatre, Cape Town, South Africa, 1975
- A Galway Girl, Space Theatre, Cape Town, South Africa, 1979
- Same Old Moon, Druid Theatre, Galway, Ireland, 1984
- The Stanley Parkers, Druid Theatre, Galway, Irelandm 1990
- The Donahue Sisters, Druid Theatre, Galway, Ireland, 1990
- My Brilliant Divorce, Town Hall Theatre, Galway, Ireland, 2001

=== Publications ===
- Seven Plays and Four Monologues, 1985 ISBN 0864860285 (includes Mickey Kannis Caught My Eye, Mr McConkey's Suitcase, On The Blue Train, The Shrinking of Alby Chapman, Spare Room, Spider).
