= Eugene O'Brien (playwright) =

Irish playwright

Eugene O'Brien is an Irish playwright, screenwriter, and actor.

He is best known for his very successful play Eden, which after playing at the Peacock Theatre/Abbey Theatre in Dublin was put on in the West End of London and Broadway in New York City. In 2001 the play won the Irish Times Best New Play of the Year Award and Stewart Parker Prize. O'Brien's second play, Savoy, premiered on the Peacock stage in 2004.

== Works ==
The author of several radio plays for RTÉ, The Nest and Sloth, in 2005 he wrote the screenplay to Pure Mule, a six-part television drama for RTÉ, which garnered five Irish Film and Television awards. As an actor, he has worked for The Corn Exchange, Bickerstaffe, Calypso, Storytellers, Barnstorm, Loose Cannon, and Glasshouse Theatre companies, and has appeared in several television series including Ballykissangel. He was awarded the Rooney Prize for Irish Literature in 2003.
