= Eden (Eugene O'Brien play) =

2001 West End and Broadway play

- Written by: Eugene O'Brien
- Characters: Billy; Breda
- Original language: English
- Genre: Drama
- Setting: a town in the Irish Midlands

Premiere
- Date premiered: 24 January 2001
- Place premiered: Abbey Theatre, Dublin

Eden is an Irish play, written by Eugene O'Brien in 2001. It premiered at the Peacock Theatre/Abbey Theatre in Dublin on 24 January 2001, and very successfully was put on in the West End of London and Broadway in New York City. In 2001 the play won the Irish Times Best New Play of the Year Award and Stewart Parker Prize.

== Synopsis ==
The play is centred on an unhappily married young couple living in a small town in the Irish Midlands over a weekend, and is told through perspectives, with many monologues. The husband, Billy, is a frequent drinker who always heads out to the local pubs on weekends. He is infatuated with a younger woman named Imelda Egan. The wife, Breda, has recently lost a lot of weight, and wants to regain the affections of her husband by heading out on the town for the first time in years and meeting him.
