= Deirdre of the Sorrows =

1909 play written by John Synge

Deirdre of the Sorrows is a three-act play written by Irish playwright John Millington Synge in 1909. The play, based on Irish mythology, in particular the myths concerning Deirdre, Naoise, and Conchobar, was unfinished at the author's death on 24 March 1909. It was completed by W. B. Yeats and Synge's fiancée, Molly Allgood and first performed at the Abbey Theatre by the Irish National Theatre Society on 13 January 1910, with Allgood as Deirdre.

== Characters ==
- Deirdre, the beautiful, ill-fated heroine
- Conchubor, High King of Ulster
- Naoise, son of Usna, Deirdre's lover
- Lavarcham, Deirdre's nurse
- Fergus, a friend of Conchubor
- Ainnle, brother of Naoise
- Ardan, brother of Naoise
- Owen, a spy for Conchubor
- Old Woman, servant to Lavarcham

== Plot synopsis ==
Act I: Lavarcham's house on Slieve Fuadh. Conchubor, the aging High King of Ulster, has charged Lavarcham to raise the child Deirdre to be his queen when she comes of age. Lavarcham finds that the now-beautiful Deirdre is a willful young woman, without interest in marrying an old man. Conchubor comes to Slieve Fuadh to bring Deirdre to his palace, Emain Macha, ignoring her pleas to remain in the countryside for another year. After he leaves, Naoise, son of Usna, and his brothers come to the cottage seeking Deirdre, and she tells them of her summons. Deirdre is aware of a prophecy that she will be the doom of the sons of Usna; nonetheless she asks Naoise to take her away from Ulster. He agrees, and Ainnle weds them in an impromptu ceremony.

Act II: Alban. Deirdre and the sons of Usna have lived happily on a remote island for seven years. Fergus arrives bearing an offer of peace from Conchubor, and asks Deirdre and Naoise to return with him to Emain Macha. Lavarcham warns Deirdre not to accept, and Owen, a spy in the service of Conchubor, intimidates Deirdre with suggestions that death awaits Naoise in Ulster. Naoise tells Fergus that he plans to live the rest of his life with Deirdre in Alban, but Deirdre convinces him to accept Conchubor's offer, reasoning that it is better to die young, at the peak of their love, than to grow old and live in the shadow of their past happiness.

Act III: A tent near Emain. Lavarcham arrives at Conchubor's tent and tries to convince him to give up his pursuit of Deirdre, claiming that she has grown old and lost her beauty. His soldiers arrive and contradict her claims, and he leaves just before Deirdre and Naoise enter. They discuss the possibility of their impending deaths until Conchubor returns. Deirdre nearly convinces him to put aside past grievances and let them live in peace when the sound of a battle between Conchubor's men and Naoise's brothers reaches them. Conchubor and Naoise go to join the fray and Naoise is killed. Fergus and his men arrive, enraged by the king's treachery, and set Emain Macha ablaze. Lavarcham tries to convince Deirdre to flee Ulster, and Conchubor tries to take her to a different castle, but she stays and mourns her dead lover and his brothers. In the end, Deirdre takes Naoise's dagger, stabs herself, and falls into his open grave, leaving Conchubor with nothing.

== Musical settings ==
The play (along with Irish legend in general) enjoyed a vogue amongst composers in the earlier part of the 20th century and many of them set Deirdre of the Sorrows to music. The first was Italo-Irish composer Michele Esposito in the cantata for soloists, mixed chorus and orchestra, Deirdre (1902) on a text by Thomas William Rolleston. Arnold Bax's orchestral tone poem Into the Twilight (1908) was originally conceived as the overture to a 5-act opera on the Deirdre theme that never materialised.

A number of composers turned the subject into an opera including Fritz Hart, Geoffrey Molyneux Palmer, Cecil Gray, Havergal Brian, Healey Wlllan and Karl Rankl. Fritz Hart wrote two operas based on the theme: Deirdre of the Sorrows (1916) and Deirdre in Exile (1926), both produced in Melbourne, Australia. Palmer's Deirdre of the Sorrows (1925) to a libretto by William Mervyn Crofton was initially unfinished, then completed by Staf Gebruers around 1930, but never performed. Cecil Gray's opera Deirdre was his first, completed in 1937. It was never performed in its entirety, but Gray did extract from its third act the Symphonic Prelude for Orchestra (1945), which received several performances in England and the United States.

Healey Willan's opera Deirdre was initially written for Canadian Radio in 1945 and revised for stage in 1965. Havergal Brian's Symphony No. 6, (the Tragic) of 1948 is an orchestral prologue to an opera that Brian planned to make of the play. The opera was not started because of copyright issues. Karl Rankl completed his opera on the play in 1951, commissioned by the Arts Council for the Festival of Britain, though the BBC and Covent Garden failed to perform the piece. Rafael Kubelik made preparations to perform the piece in the early 1950s, but the plans once again fell through, due, he said, to "politics". Rankl eventually extracted an orchestral suite for large orchestra from the score in 1956. The BBC finally performed excerpts from the opera in 1995.

Other operas on the same theme include Marguerite Béclard d'Harcourt's Dierdane (after Synge's play, 1941), John J. Becker's Deirdre of the Sorrows (also after Synge, 1945), Fré Focke's Deirdre (1949), David Armstrong's Deirdre (1965), Curtis K. Hughes's Deirdre of the Sorrows (1996), and Frederick Frayling-Kelly's Deirdre (2009).

After Esposito's cantata of 1902, other works in this genre include Eric Sweeney's Deirdre (1989), Andrew Ford's Deirdre of the Sorrows (1989), James MacMillan's The Prophecy (1997), Patrick Cassidy's Deirdre of the Sorrows (1998), and Bernard van Beurden's Deirdre (2002).

Irish composer Éamonn Ó Gallchobhair composed the ballet score Deirdre in 1940. Purely orchestral scores include Edric Cundell's symphonic poem The Tragedy of Deirdre (1922) and Rutland Boughton Deirdre: A Celtic Symphony (1927).
