= In the Shadow of the Glen =

1903 play written by John Millington Synge

In the Shadow of the Glen, also known as The Shadow of the Glen, is a one-act play written by the Irish playwright J. M. Synge and first performed at the Molesworth Hall, Dublin, on 8 October 1903. It was the first of Synge's plays to be performed on stage. It is set in an isolated cottage in County Wicklow in the present, circa 1903.

== Important characters ==
- Daniel Burke, an elderly farmer
- Nora Burke, his young wife
- Michael Dara, a youthful shepherd
- A Tramp, a tramp

== Synopsis ==
A tramp seeks shelter in the Burkes' isolated farmhouse and finds Nora tending to Dan's corpse. When Nora leaves to find Michael, Dan reveals to the tramp that his death is a mere ruse. He plays dead again when Nora and Michael return, but leaps up in protest when Michael proposes marriage to Nora. Dan tells Nora to leave and orders the tramp out as well. The tramp announces he is ready to leave to face what the world offers, and Nora opts to join him. Dan and Michael remain behind and share a drink.

== Quotes ==
- "... isn't a dead man itself more company than to be sitting alone, and hearing the winds crying, and you not knowing on what thing your mind would stay?" — Nora
- "Maybe cold would be no sign of death with the like of him, for he was always cold, every day since I knew him — and every night, stranger" — Nora
- "For what good is a bit of a farm with cows on it, and sheep on the back hills, when you do be sitting looking out from a door the like of that door, and seeing nothing but the mists rolling down the bog, and the mists again, and they rolling up the bog, and hearing nothing but the wind crying out in the bits of broken trees were left from the great storm, and the streams roaring with the rain." — Nora
