= The Well of the Saints =

1905 play written by John Millington Synge

The Well of the Saints is a three-act play written by Irish playwright J. M. Synge, first performed at the Abbey Theatre by the Irish National Theatre Society in February 1905. The setting is specified as "some lonely mountainous district in the east of Ireland one or more centuries ago."

== Important Characters ==
- Martin Doul, an elderly blind beggar
- Mary Doul, his wife, also blind
- Timmy, a young blacksmith
- Molly Byrne, Timmy's beautiful fiancee
- The Saint, a wandering holy man

== Plot synopsis ==
Martin and Mary Doul are two blind beggars who have been led by the lies of the townsfolk to believe that they are beautiful when in fact they are old and ugly. A saint cures them of their blindness with water from a holy well and at first sight they are disgusted by each other. Martin goes to work for Timmy the smith and tries to seduce Timmy's betrothed, Molly, but she viciously rejects him and Timmy sends him away. Martin and Mary both lose their sight again, and when the saint returns to wed Timmy and Molly, Martin refuses his offer to cure their blindness again. The saint takes offence and the townsfolk banish the couple, who head south in search of kinder neighbours.

== Quotes ==
- "And that's the last thing I'm to set my sight on in the life of the world - the villainy of a woman and the bloody strength of a man." - Martin Doul
- "The devil mend the old Saint for letting me see it was lies." - Martin Doul
