= Garry Hynes =

Irish theatre director (born 1953)

Garry Hynes (born 10 June 1953) is an Irish theatre director. She was the first woman to win the prestigious Tony Award for Best Direction of a Play.

== Life and career ==
Hynes was born in Ballaghaderreen, County Roscommon, and educated at St. Louis Convent at Monaghan, the Dominican Convent at Galway, and UCG.

She is a co-founder of the Druid Theatre Company with Mick Lally and Marie Mullen in 1975 after meeting through the drama society of U.C.G. where they studied. She was Druid's artistic director from 1975 to 1991, and again from 1995 to date. Hynes directed for the Abbey Theatre from 1984 and was its artistic director from 1991 to 1994, and also the Royal Shakespeare Company, the Royal Exchange, Manchester, the Kennedy Center and the Royal Court Theatre, London.

She was the civil partner of film producer Martha O'Neill.

== Works ==
=== Stage productions ===
Druid Theatre Company

- The Cripple of Inishmaan, (Galway, Irish & UK tour, New York)
- My Brilliant Divorce, (Galway and Irish Tour)
- Long Day's Journey into Night, (Galway and Dublin Theatre Festival)
- Leaves, (Galway and Royal Court Theatre, London)
- The Playboy of the Western World, (Tokyo International Arts Festival)
- Empress of India, (Galway and Dublin Theatre Festival)
- The Year of the Hiker,(Galway and National Tour)
- DruidSynge, (Galway Arts Festival, Dublin, Edinburgh International Festival and Inis Meáin 2005; Minneapolis and Lincoln Center Festival, New York 2006)
- Sharon's Grave (Royal Court Co-Production)
- Sive (Royal Court Co-Production)
- On Raftery's Hill (Royal Court Co-Production)
- The Beauty Queen of Leenane (Royal Court Co-Production)
- The Leenane Trilogy (Royal Court Co-Productions)
- Lovers Meeting
- Conversations on a Homecoming
- Bailegangaire
- The Shaughran
- Wood of the Whispering

Abbey Theatre

- King of the Castle
- The Plough and the Stars
- The Power of Darkness
- Famine
- A Whistle in the Dark
- Portia Coughlan

Other

- The Weir (Gate Theatre, Dublin) (2008)
- Juno (Encores! New York City Center) (2008)
- Translations (McCarter Theatre/Manhattan Theater Club, New Jersey) (2006)
- Mr. Peters' Connections (Signature Theatre Company, Off-Broadway) (1998)
- Crimes of the Heart (Second Stage Theatre, Off-Broadway) (2001)
- My Brilliant Divorce (West End)
- Crestfall (Gate Theatre, Dublin) (2003)
- 16 Wounded (Broadway) (2004)
- A Streetcar Named Desire (Kennedy Center, Washington) (2004)

== Legacy ==
=== Portrait in National Gallery of Ireland ===
In 2017, award-winning artist Vera Klute was commissioned by the National Gallery of Ireland to create a portrait of Hynes as part of the 2015 Hennessey Portrait Prize. The bust, made of porcelain, concrete and timber (with a dimension of 164 cm x 54 cm x 45 cm), was unveiled to the public in April 2017 and is currently on display as part of the Gallery's National Portrait Collection.

=== DruidSynge ===
Hynes directed DruidSynge, the company's critically acclaimed production of all six of John Millington Synge's plays that premièred at the Galway Arts Festival in 2005 and has since toured to Dublin, Edinburgh, Inis Meáin, Minneapolis and New York. DruidSynge has been described by Charles Isherwood of The New York Times as "the highlight not just of my theatre going year but of my theatre going life" and by The Irish Times as "one of the greatest achievements in the history of Irish theatre."

== Awards and honours ==
Hynes has received honorary Doctorates from the University of Dublin (2004), The National University of Ireland, Galway (1998) and the National Council for Education Awards (1988).

In 1998 she won the Tony Award for Direction for The Beauty Queen of Leenane, the first woman to receive the award.

She is a recipient of many other Theatre Awards, including The Irish Times/ESB Irish Theatre Award for Best Director (2002) and a The Irish Times Special Tribute Award for her contribution to Irish Theatre in February 2005.

On 15 June 2006 she was awarded the Freedom of the City of Galway, its highest bestowed honour.

On 30 November 2022 Hynes was named a Chevalier de l'Ordre des Arts et des Lettres.

== See also ==
- Irish theatre
- List of Tony Award records
- Eidhean mac Cléireach – ancestor of the Hynes family
- Mael Ruanaidh na Paidre Ua hEidhin – first Hynes king of Aidhne
- Eoghan Ó hEidhin – last Hynes king of Aidhne
- Uí Fiachrach Aidhne – home kingdom of the Hynes family
