= The Tinker's Wedding =

1909 play written by John Millington Synge

The Tinker's Wedding is a two-act play by the Irish playwright J. M. Synge, whose main characters—as the title suggests—are Irish Tinkers. It is set on a roadside near a chapel in rural Ireland and premiered on 11 November 1909.

== Important characters ==
- Michael Byrne, a tinker
- Sarah Casey, his lover
- Mary Byrne, Michael's mother
- A Priest

== Plot synopsis ==
Sarah Casey convinces the reluctant Michael Byrne to marry her by threatening to run off with another man. She accosts a local priest and convinces him to wed them for ten shillings and a tin can. Michael's mother shows up drunk and harasses the priest, then steals the can to exchange it for more drink. The next morning Sarah and Michael go to the chapel to be wed, but when the priest finds that the can is missing he refuses to perform the ceremony. Sarah protests and a fight breaks out that ends with the priest tied up in a sack. The tinkers free him after he swears not to set the police after them and he curses them in God's name as they flee in mock terror.

== Performance ==
The play had its world premiere at His Majesty's Theatre in London on 11 November 1909, after Synge's death earlier that year.

== Bibliography ==
- Synge, J.M. (1935). The Complete Plays (1st ed.). New York: Vintage Books.
- Burke, Mary (2009). "Tinkers": Synge and the Cultural History of the Irish Traveller. Oxford University Press. ISBN 978-0-19-956646-4.
