= John Millington Synge =

Irish writer (1871–1909)

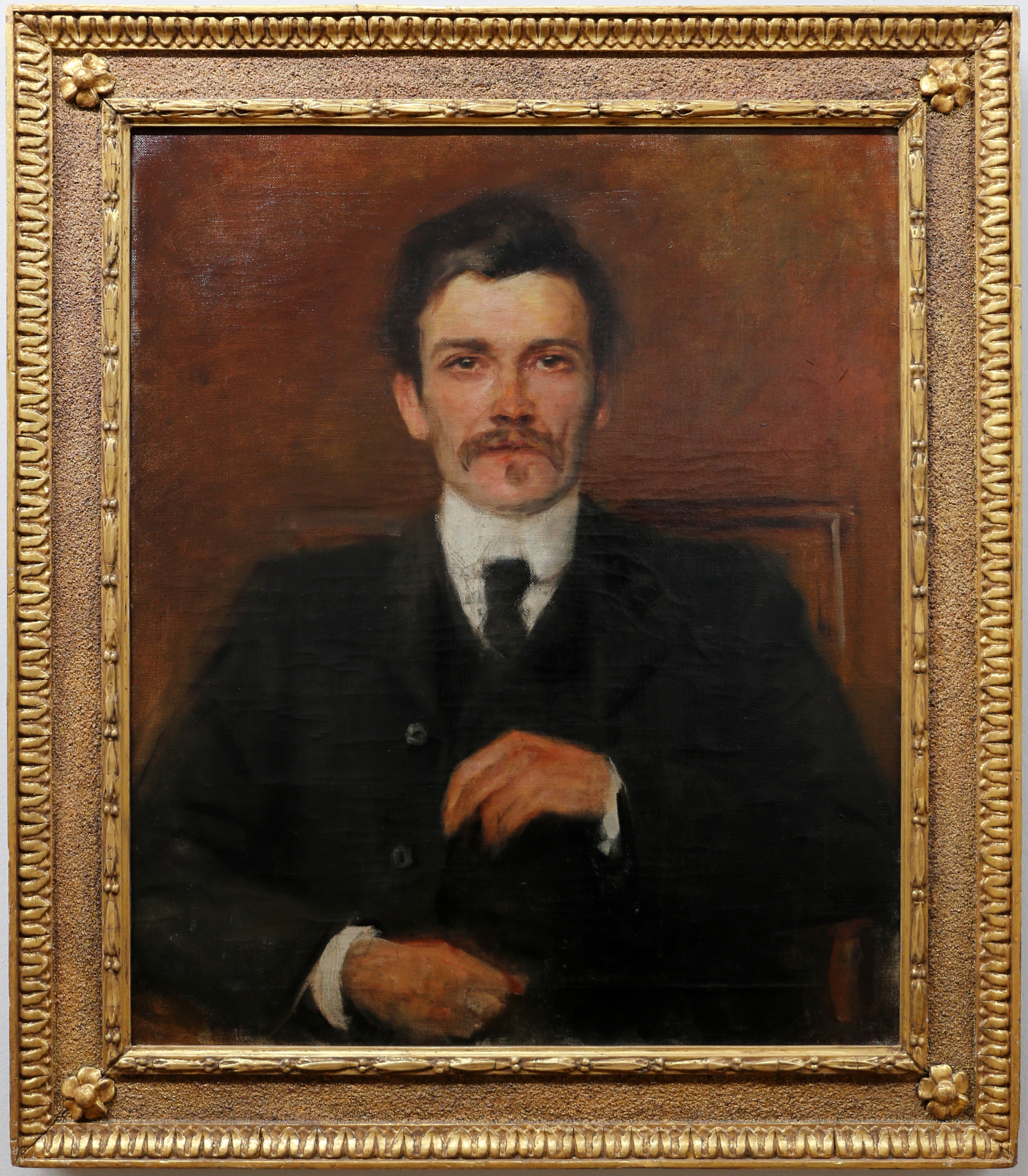
- Portrait of J. M. Synge (c. 1905)
- Born: Edmund John Millington Synge; 16 April 1871; Rathfarnham, County Dublin, Ireland
- Died: 24 March 1909 (aged 37); Dublin, Ireland
- Resting place: Mount Jerome Cemetery
- Education: Trinity College, Dublin (BA)
- Writing career
- Notable works: In the Shadow of the Glen (1903); Riders to the Sea (1904); The Well of the Saints (1905); The Playboy of the Western World (1907); The Tinker's Wedding (1909); Deirdre of the Sorrows (1910)
- Movement: Irish Literary Revival

Edmund John Millington Synge (/sɪŋ/; 16 April 1871 – 24 March 1909), popularly known as J. M. Synge, was an Irish playwright, poet, and collector of folklore. As a key figure of the Irish Literary Revival and credited with reviving Irish literature during the early 20th century, he is widely regarded by scholars to be among the most prolific playwrights of the Edwardian era. Several of his plays continue to be performed at the Abbey Theatre in Dublin.

His play The Playboy of the Western World (1907), one of his best-known works, was initially poorly received, due to its bleak ending, crude depiction of poor Irish peasants, and the idealisation of patricide, leading to hostile audience reactions and street riots in Dublin during its opening run at the Abbey Theatre, which he had co-founded with William Butler Yeats and Lady Gregory. His other major works include In the Shadow of the Glen (1903), Riders to the Sea (1904), The Well of the Saints (1905), and The Tinker's Wedding (1909). Most of his plays were known for their highly realistic depictions of Irish society and culture, and included plots, themes, landscapes, and settings drawn from places he visited during his travels.

Synge came from a wealthy Anglo-Irish background, and mainly wrote about working-class Catholics in rural Ireland, and what he saw as their pagan worldview. Owing to his ill health, he was schooled at home. His early interest in music led to a scholarship and a degree at Trinity College Dublin, and he went to Germany in 1893 to study music. In 1894, he moved to Paris, where he took up poetry and literary criticism and met Yeats, and later returned to Ireland.

Synge had a relatively short career (c. 1903–1909), but his works continue to be held in high regard due to their cultural and literary significance. He was also one of the co-founders of the Abbey Theatre in Dublin, along with W. B. Yeats and Lady Gregory. He suffered from Hodgkin's disease, and died aged 37 from Hodgkin's-related cancer while writing what became Deirdre of the Sorrows (1910), considered by some as his masterpiece, though it was unfinished during his lifetime. Since his death, Synge has become one of Ireland's most popular and significant playwrights, and his works continue to be studied and discussed in Irish literary circles. He was held in high regard by several of his peers, among them W. B. Yeats, and he had a direct influence on later Irish writers such as Samuel Beckett and Brinsley MacNamara.

== Biography ==
=== Early life ===
Synge was born on 16 April 1871, in Newtown Villas, Rathfarnham, County Dublin, the youngest of eight children of upper-middle-class Protestant parents. His older brother, Samuel Synge became a medical missionary to Southern China. His father John Hatch Synge was a barrister and came from a family of landed gentry in Glanmore Castle, County Wicklow. Synge's paternal grandfather, also named John Synge, was an evangelical Christian involved in the movement that became the Plymouth Brethren, and his maternal grandfather, Robert Traill, was a Church of Ireland rector in Schull, County Cork, who died in 1847 during the Great Irish Famine. He was a descendant of Edward Synge, Archbishop of Tuam, and Edward's son Nicholas, the Bishop of Killaloe. His nephews included mathematician John Lighton Synge and optical microscopy pioneer Edward Hutchinson Synge.

Synge's father died from smallpox aged 49 and was buried on his son's first birthday. His mother moved the family to the house next door to her mother's house in Rathgar, County Dublin. Although often ill, Synge had a happy childhood. He developed an interest in bird-watching along the banks of the River Dodder, and during family holidays at the seaside resort of Greystones, County Wicklow, and the family estate at Glanmore.

He was home-educated at schools in Dublin and Bray, and studied piano, flute, violin, music theory and counterpoint at the Royal Irish Academy of Music. He travelled to the continent to study music, but later decided to focus on literature. He was a talented student and won a scholarship in counterpoint in 1891. The family moved to the suburb of Kingstown (now Dún Laoghaire) in 1888, and Synge entered Trinity College, Dublin, the following year. He graduated with a bachelor's degree in 1892, having studied Irish and Hebrew, as well as continuing his music studies and playing with the Academy Orchestra in the Antient Concert Rooms. Between November 1889 and 1894 he took private music lessons with Robert Prescott Stewart.

Synge later developed an interest in Irish antiquities and the Aran Islands, and became a member of the Irish League for a year. He left the League because, as he told Maud Gonne, "my theory of regeneration for Ireland differs from yours ... I wish to work on my own for the cause of Ireland, and I shall never be able to do so if I get mixed up with a revolutionary and semi-military movement." In 1893 he published his first known work, a poem influenced by Wordsworth, in Kottabos: A College Miscellany.

=== Early work ===
After graduating, Synge moved to Germany to study music. He stayed in Coblenz during 1893 before moving to Würzburg in January 1894. Because of his shyness about performing in public, coupled with his doubt about his own ability, he abandoned music to pursue his literary interests. He returned to Ireland in June 1894 before moving to Paris in January 1895 to study literature and languages at the Sorbonne. He met Cherrie Matheson during summer breaks with his family in Dublin. He proposed to her in 1895 and again the next year, but she turned him down on both occasions because of their differing views on religion. The rejections greatly affected him and reinforced his determination to move abroad.

In 1896, he visited Italy to study the language before returning to Paris. He planned on a career in writing about French authors. That year he met W. B. Yeats who encouraged him to spend time on the Aran Islands, after which he returned to Dublin. In 1899 he joined Yeats, Augusta, Lady Gregory and George William Russell to form the Irish National Theatre Society, which later established the Abbey Theatre. He wrote some pieces of literary criticism for Gonne's Irlande Libre and other journals, as well as unpublished poems and prose in a decadent fin de siècle style. (These writings were eventually gathered in the 1960s for his Collected Works.) He also attended lectures at the Sorbonne by the noted Celtic scholar Henri d'Arbois de Jubainville.

=== Aran Islands and first plays ===
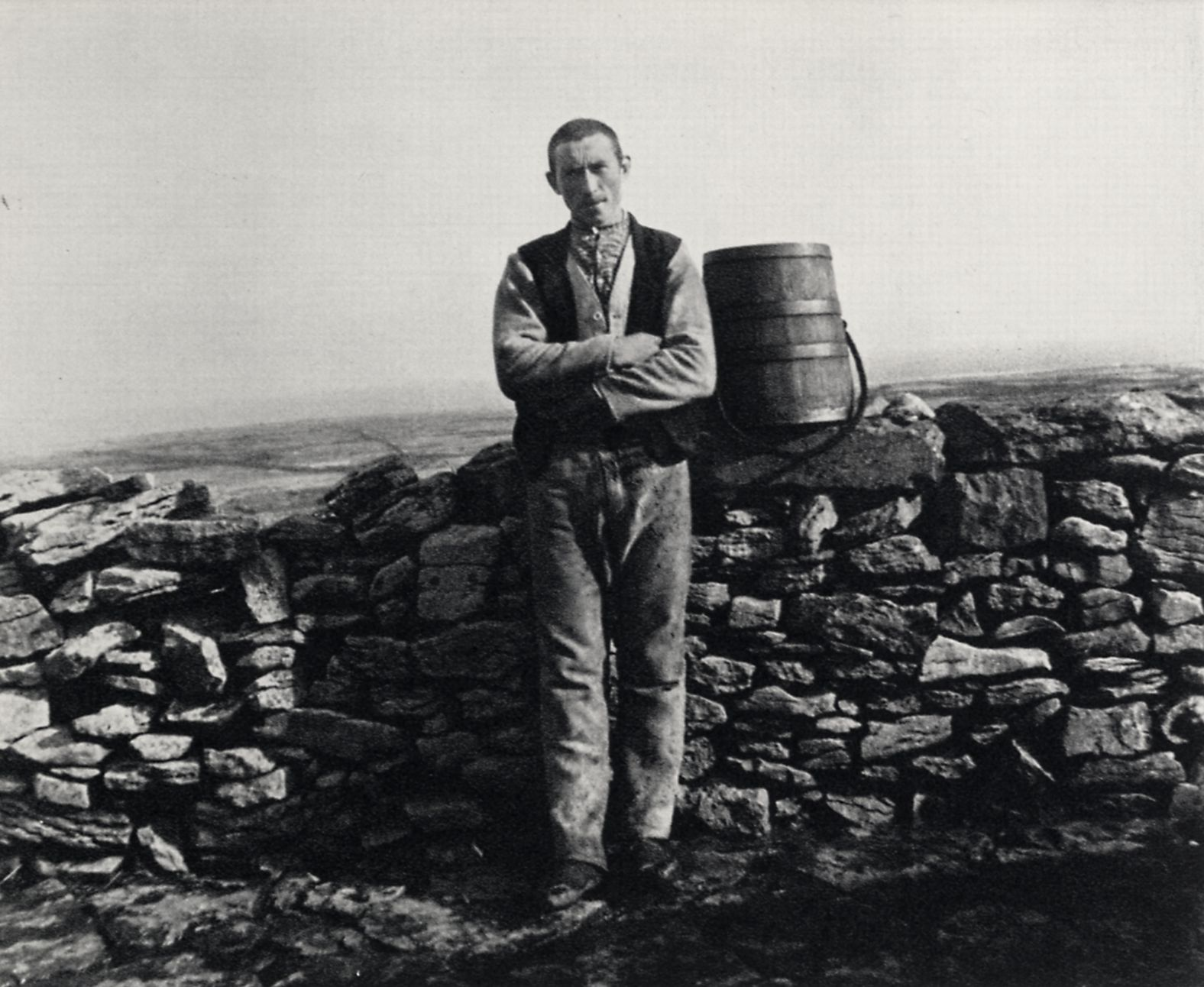
John Millington Synge: A resident of the island of Inishmaan (1898)

In 1897, Synge suffered his first attack of Hodgkin's, after which an enlarged gland was removed from his neck. He visited Lady Gregory's home, at Coole Park near Gort, County Galway, where he met Yeats again and also Edward Martyn. He spent the following five summers there, collecting stories and folklore, perfecting his Irish, but living in Paris for most of the rest of each year. He also visited Brittany regularly. During this period he wrote his first play, When the Moon Has Set which he sent to Lady Gregory for the Irish Literary Theatre in 1900, but she rejected it. The play was not published until it appeared in his Collected Works.

Synge's first account of life on the Aran Islands was published in the New Ireland Review in 1898 and his book, The Aran Islands, completed in 1901 and published in 1907 with illustrations by Jack Butler Yeats. Synge considered the book "my first serious piece of work". Lady Gregory read the manuscript and advised Synge to remove any direct naming of places and to add more folk stories, but he declined to do either because he wanted to create something more realistic. The book conveys Synge's belief that beneath the Catholicism of the islanders, it was possible to detect a substratum of the pagan beliefs of their ancestors. His experiences in the Arans formed the basis for the plays about Irish rural life that Synge went on to write.

Synge left Paris for London in 1903. He had written two one-act plays, Riders to the Sea and The Shadow of the Glen, the previous year. These met with Lady Gregory's approval and The Shadow of the Glen was performed at the Molesworth Hall in October 1903. Riders to the Sea was staged at the same venue in February the following year. The Shadow of the Glen, under the title In the Shadow of the Glen, formed part of the bill for the opening run of the Abbey Theatre from 27 December 1904 to 3 January 1905. Both plays were based on stories that Synge had collected in the Arans, and Synge relied on props from the Arana to help set the stage for each of them. He also relied on Hiberno-English, the English dialect of Ireland, to reinforce its usefulness as a literary language, partly because he believed that the Irish language could not survive.

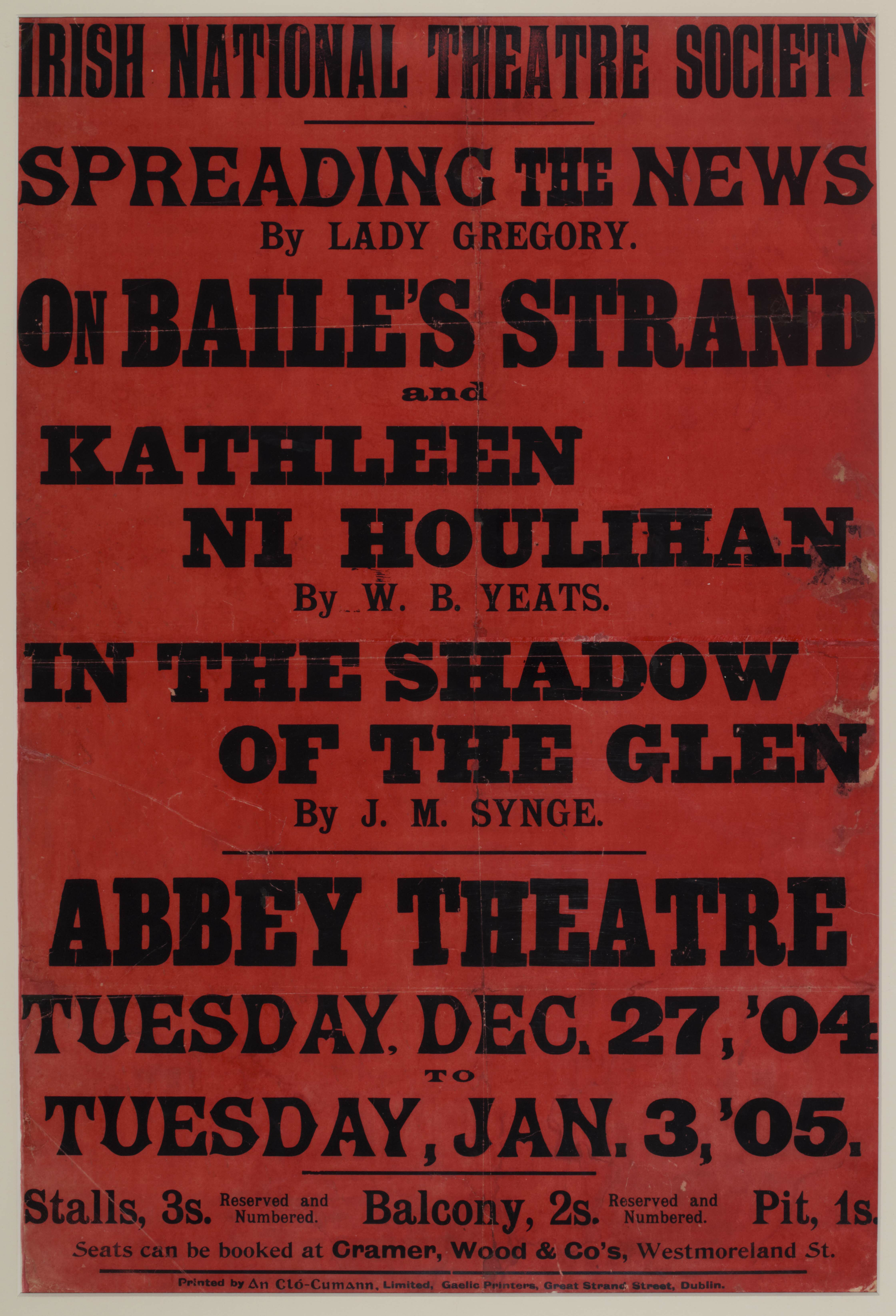
Poster for opening of Abbey Theatre featuring In the Shadow of the Glen

The Shadow of the Glen is based on a story about an unfaithful wife, and was criticised by the Irish nationalist leader Arthur Griffith as "a slur on Irish womanhood". Years later Synge wrote: "When I was writing The Shadow of the Glen some years ago I got more aid than any learning could have given me from a chink in the floor of the old Wicklow house where I was staying, that let me hear what was being said by the servant girls in the kitchen." Griffith's criticism encouraged more attacks alleging that Synge described Irish women in an unfair manner. Riders to the Sea was also attacked by nationalists, this time including Patrick Pearse, who decried it because of the author's attitude to God and religion. Pearse, Griffith and other conservative-minded Catholics claimed Synge had done a disservice to Irish nationalism by not idealising his characters, but later critics have stated he idealised the Irish peasantry too much. A third one-act play, The Tinker's Wedding, was drafted around this time, but Synge initially made no attempt to have it performed, largely because of a scene in which a priest is tied up in a sack, which, as he wrote to the publisher Elkin Mathews in 1905, would probably upset "a good many of our Dublin friends".

When the Abbey Theatre was established, Synge was appointed literary adviser and became a director, along with Yeats and Lady Gregory. He differed from what they believed the Irish theatre should be. He wrote to Stephen MacKenna:

I do not believe in the possibility of "a purely fantastic, unmodern, ideal, breezy, spring-dayish, Cuchulainoid National Theatre" ... no drama can grow out of anything other than the fundamental realities of life, which are never fantastic, are neither modern nor unmodern and, as I see them, rarely spring-dayish, or breezy or Cuchulanoid.

Synge's next play, The Well of the Saints, was staged at the Abbey in 1905, again to nationalist disapproval, and then in 1906 at the Deutsches Theater in Berlin. The critic Joseph Holloway asserted that the play combined "lyric and dirt".

=== Playboy riots and after ===
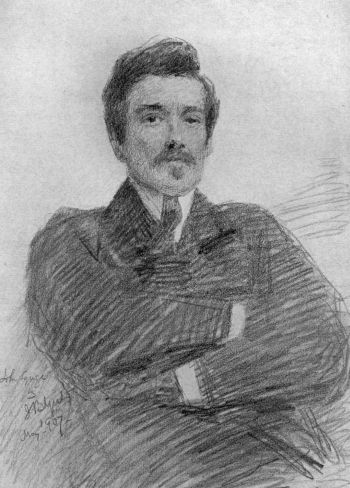
John Millington Synge

Synge's widely regarded masterpiece, The Playboy of the Western World, was first performed on 26 January 1907, at the Abbey Theatre. A comedy about apparent patricide, it attracted a hostile reaction from sections of the Irish public. The Freeman's Journal described it as "an unmitigated, protracted libel upon Irish peasant men, and worse still upon Irish girlhood". Arthur Griffith, who believed that the Abbey Theatre was insufficiently politically committed, described the play as "a vile and inhuman story told in the foulest language we have ever listened to from a public platform", and perceived a slight on the virtue of Irish womanhood in the line "... a drift of chosen females, standing in their shifts ..." At the time, a shift was known as a symbol representing Kitty O'Shea and her adulterous relationship with Charles Stuart Parnell.

A section of the audience at the opening rioted, causing the third act to be acted out in dumbshow. The disturbances continued for a week, interrupting the following performances. Years later, after a similar disturbance at the opening of The Plough and the Stars by Seán O'Casey, Yeats said the audience had "disgraced yourselves again. Is this to be an ever-recurring celebration of the arrival of Irish genius? Synge first and then O'Casey?"

The writing of The Tinker's Wedding began at the same time as Riders to the Sea and In the Shadow of the Glen. It took Synge five years to complete. Riders was performed in the Racquet Court theatre in Galway on 4–8 January 1907, but not performed again until 1909, and then only in London. The first critic to respond was Daniel Corkery who said, "One is sorry Synge ever wrote so poor a thing, and one fails to understand why it ever should have been staged anywhere".

== Death ==
Synge died from Hodgkin lymphoma at the Elpis Nursing Home in Dublin on 24 March 1909, aged 37, and was buried in Mount Jerome Cemetery, Harold's Cross, Dublin.

The collected volume Poems and Translations, with a preface by Yeats, was published by the Cuala Press on 8 April 1909. Yeats and the actress and one-time fiancée Molly Allgood (Maire O'Neill) completed Synge's unfinished final play, Deirdre of the Sorrows. It was performed by the Abbey players on Thursday 13 January 1910, with Allgood as Deirdre.

== Personality ==
John Masefield, who knew Synge, wrote that he "gave one from the first the impression of a strange personality". Masefield said that Synge's view of life originated in his poor health. In particular, Masefield said "His relish of the savagery made me feel that he was a dying man clutching at life, and clutching most wildly at violent life, as the sick man does".

Yeats described Synge as timid and shy, who "never spoke an unkind word" yet his words could "fill the streets with rioters". Richard Ellmann, the biographer of Yeats and James Joyce, stated that Synge "built a fantastic drama out of Irish life.

Yeats described Synge in the poem "In Memory of Major Robert Gregory":

...And that enquiring man John Synge comes next,
That dying chose the living world for text
And never could have rested in the tomb
But that, long travelling, he had come
Towards nightfall upon certain set apart
In a most desolate stony place,
Towards nightfall upon a race
Passionate and simple like his heart.

Synge was a political radical, immersed in the socialist literature of William Morris and in his own words "wanted to change things root and branch". Much to the consternation of his mother, he went to Paris in 1896 to become more involved in radical politics, and his interest in the topic lasted until his dying days when he sought to engage his nurses on the topic of feminism.

== Legacy ==
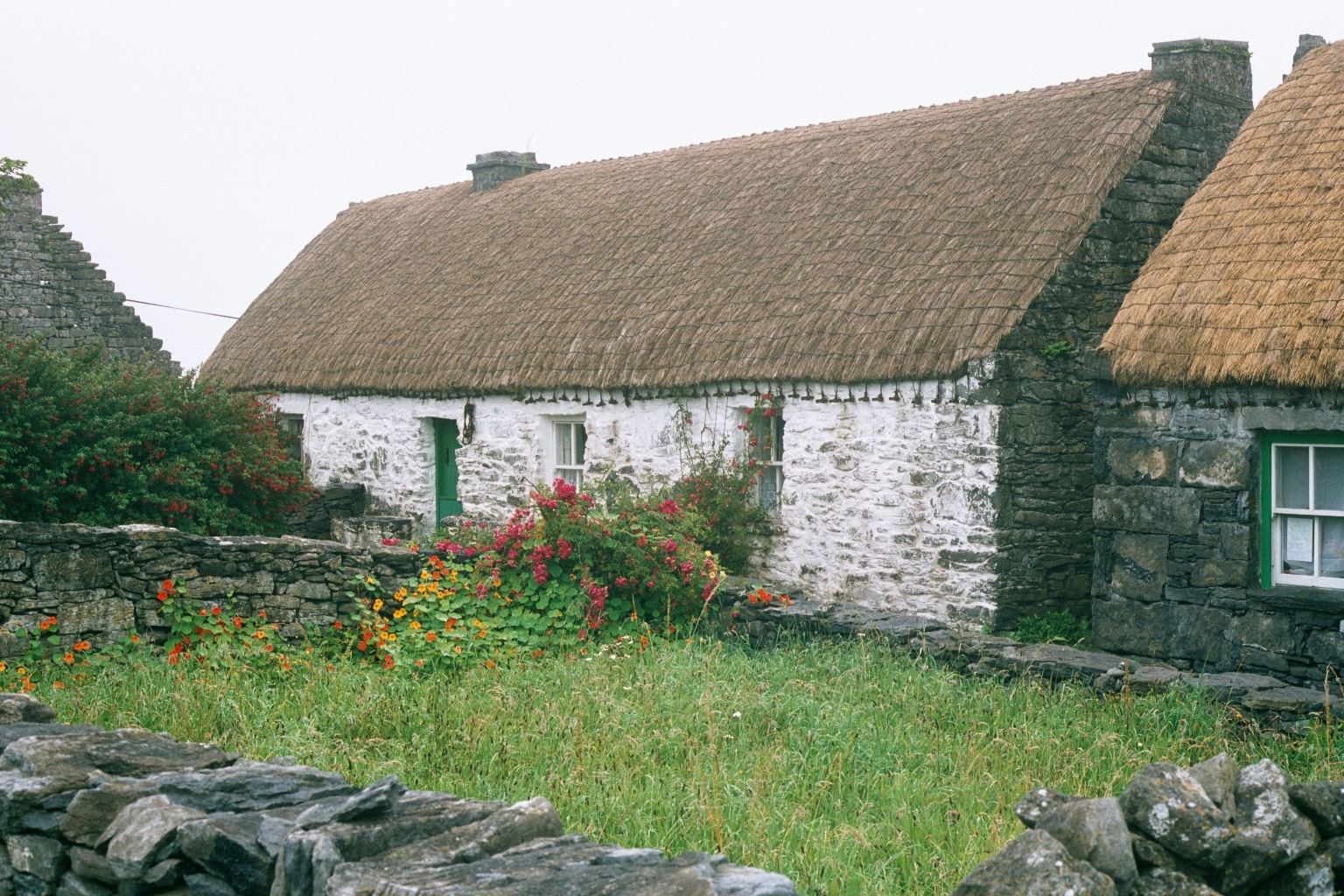
The cottage where Synge lodged on Inis Meáin, now the Teach Synge museum

Synge is generally considered by critics as the most prolific Irish playwright of the Edwardian era. Yeats said that Synge was "the greatest dramatic genius of Ireland". While Yeats and Lady Gregory were "the centrepieces of the Irish theatrical renaissance, it was Synge ... who gave the movement its national quality ..." His plays helped set the dominant style at the Abbey Theatre until the 1940s. The stylised realism of his writing was reflected in the training given at the theatre's school of acting, and plays of peasant life were the main staple of the repertoire until the end of the 1950s. Sean O'Casey, the next major dramatist to write for the Abbey, knew Synge's work well and attempted to do for the Dublin working classes what Synge had done for the rural poor. Brendan Behan, Brinsley MacNamara, and Lennox Robinson were all indebted to Synge.

The Irish literary critic Vivian Mercier was among the first to recognise Samuel Beckett's debt to Synge. Beckett was a regular member of the audience at the Abbey in his youth and particularly admired the plays of Yeats, Synge and O'Casey. Mercier points out parallels between Synge's casts of tramps, beggars and peasants and many of the figures in Beckett's novels and dramatic works.

Synge's cottage in the Aran Islands has been restored as a tourist attraction. An annual Synge Summer School has been held every summer since 1991 in the village of Rathdrum, County Wicklow. Synge is the subject of Mac Dara Ó Curraidhín's 1999 documentary film, Synge agus an Domhan Thiar (Synge and the Western World). Joseph O'Connor wrote a novel, Ghost Light (2010), loosely based on Synge's relationship with Molly Allgood.

== Selected works ==
- In the Shadow of the Glen, 1903
- Riders to the Sea, 1904
- The Well of the Saints, 1905
- The Aran Islands, 1907
- The Playboy of the Western World, 1907
- The Tinker's Wedding, 1909
- Deirdre of the Sorrows, 1910
