= The General (1998 film) =

1998 film by John Boorman

- Theatrical release poster
- Directed by: John Boorman
- Screenplay by: John Boorman
- Based on: The General; 1995 book by Paul Williams
- Produced by: John Boorman
- Starring: Brendan Gleeson; Adrian Dunbar; Sean McGinley; Maria Doyle Kennedy; Angeline Ball; Jon Voight
- Cinematography: Seamus Deasy
- Music by: Richie Buckley
- Distributed by: Warner Bros.
- Release date: 18 December 1998
- Running time: 124 minutes
- Countries: Ireland; United Kingdom
- Language: English
- Box office: $3.8 million

The General is a 1998 crime film written and directed by John Boorman about Dublin crime boss Martin Cahill, who undertook several daring heists in the early 1980s and attracted the attention of the Garda Síochána, Irish Republican Army (IRA) and Ulster Volunteer Force (UVF). The film was shot in 1997 and released in 1998. Brendan Gleeson plays Cahill, Adrian Dunbar plays his friend Noel Curley, and Jon Voight plays Inspector Ned Kenny.

== Plot ==
On August 18, 1994, Martin Cahill leaves his home in Cowper Downs, Rathmines. He is ambushed by an assassin, who escapes on a motorcycle driven by an accomplice. As his family grieve, his Garda nemesis, Inspector Ned Kenny, arrives to see his corpse removed from the scene.

In the 1950s, a young Cahill and his siblings engage in theft to supplement their family's meagre income. He is caught by a Garda as he attempts a theft from a butcher's shop, and is incarcerated in an industrial school.

By the early 1980s, Cahill is released from prison and returns to his home at the run-down Hollyfield Buildings in Rathmines. Dublin Corporation is in the process of demolishing the buildings, something which Cahill opposes in the courts. Garda Sergeant Ned Kenny assists the Corporation in evicting current residents, and attempts to get Cahill to leave peacefully.

After the demolition of the buildings, Cahill moves a caravan onto the site. The caravan is subsequently burned out. Cahill then erects a tent and continues to prevent construction of new houses. He backs down when Dublin Corporation provide him with a new home in Rathmines.

Cahill purchases a new home in an upscale area for £80,000, turning his cash into a bank draft at a local bank. He then instructs his gang to rob the bank, while he is inside the police station across the street, humiliating the newly promoted Inspector Ned Kenny.

Cahill and his associate Noel Curley commit an armed robbery of a video arcade. They are arrested and face trial. During the trial, Cahill attempts numerous tactics to get acquitted, including attempting to kill the State's chief forensic scientist with a car bomb. After the State fails to prove that Cahill and Curley put the victim of the armed robbery in fear of her life, they are acquitted.

Cahill and his gang plan and commit a robbery of O'Connor's jewellery factory in Harold's Cross. It is the largest robbery in the history of the State, with the haul valued at over £2,000,000. The gang sells the haul to a fence from London. When a gold bar from the haul goes missing in transport, Cahill blames the driver of the truck. Cahill tortures the driver in the back room of a pool hall, eventually nailing the driver's hands to a pool table. Cahill later takes the driver to hospital for treatment, convinced of his innocence.

The IRA, who had previously attempted to rob O'Connor's, demand half of the proceeds from Cahill's successful robbery. Cahill refuses. The IRA then form a group calling itself "Concerned Parents Against Drugs" (CPAD) who attempt to intimidate Cahill and his gang. Cahill and his gang then form "Concerned Criminals Against Drugs" and repel CPAD.

Cahill and his gang then case Russborough House in County Wicklow. They then steal the Beit collection of paintings housed there. The gang successfully steal eighteen paintings, avoiding detection by an elaborate alarm system and armed members of the Gardaí.

Humiliated, the Gardaí form the "Tango Squad". Detectives and uniformed Gardaí engage in 24-hour surveillance of Cahill and his gang. He evades them temporarily, and engages with the UVF in order to sell the stolen paintings.

Investigators from Revenue attempt to interrogate Cahill at his home. He arranges to have their car burned out. Cahill later suffers a diabetic hypo.

His gang member Gary is later accused of raping his own daughter. Cahill attempts to bribe the young woman into silence. When this fails, he shoots Gary in the kneecap in an attempt to prevent the case going to court

News breaks of Cahill's involvement with the UVF and the selling of the stolen Beit paintings. The Gardaí surveilling him are disgusted and launch rocks at him

The film ends with the assassination of Cahill outside his home, with the IRA claiming responsibility.

== Cast ==
- Brendan Gleeson as Martin Cahill
  - Eamonn Owens as young Martin Cahill
- Adrian Dunbar as Noel Curley
- Sean McGinley as Gary
- Maria Doyle Kennedy as Frances
- Angeline Ball as Tina
- Jon Voight as Inspector Ned Kenny
- Pat Laffan as Sergeant Patrick Higgins
- Eanna MacLiam as Jimmy
- Tom Murphy as Willie Byrne
- Paul Hickey as Anthony
- Tommy O'Neill as Paddy
- John O'Toole as Shea
- Ciarán Fitzgerald as Tommy
- Ned Dennehy as Gay
- Vinny Murphy as Harry (as Vinnie Murphy)
- Brendan Coyle as UVF leader
- Jim Sheridan as CPAD (Concerned Parents Against Drugs) leader
- Don Wycherley as Mr. Mackie, Martin Cahill's barrister
- Ronan Wilmot as Dr. James Donovan
- Roxanna Williams as Orla

== Production ==
The film is based on the book of the same name by Irish journalist Paul Williams, who was then crime correspondent for the Sunday World. The director, John Boorman, was one of Cahill's burglary victims. This event is dramatised in a scene in which Cahill breaks into a home, stealing a gold record and pilfering a watch from the wrist of a sleeping woman. The gold record, which Cahill later breaks in disgust after discovering it is not made of gold, was awarded for the score of Deliverance, Boorman's best-known film.

Filming was at various locations around Dublin, including South Lotts and Ranelagh. Although shot in colour, the theatrical release of the film was presented in black-and-white for artistic reasons, while an alternate version of the desaturated original colour print was subsequently made available for television broadcast and home video. Asked why he chose to depict Cahill's life in black-and-white, Boorman said

I love black-and-white, and since I was making the film independently — I borrowed the money from the bank — there was no one to tell me I couldn't. If I had made [The General] for a studio, they wouldn't let me do that. The other reason, the main reason, was because it was about recent events and people who were still alive. I wanted to give it a little distance. Black-and-white gives you that sort of parallel world. Also, it's very close to the condition of dreaming, to the unconscious. I wanted it to have this mythic level because I felt this character was an archetype. All throughout history, you find this rebel, this violent, funny, brilliant kind of character. I wanted to make that kind of connection, and black-and-white film helps. Up until the middle to late '60s, it was a choice to film in black-and-white or color. But then television became so vital to a film's finance, and television won't show black-and-white. So that killed it off, really.

== Reception ==
The General holds an approval rating of 83% based on 47 reviews on website Rotten Tomatoes. The consensus summarizes: "Director John Boorman assuredly returns to the crime genre with The General -- a psychologically rich and darkly humorous piece of gangster cinema anchored by Brendan Gleeson's audacious performance." Metacritic, which uses a weighted average, assigned the film a score of 81 out of 100, based on 21 critics, indicating "universal acclaim".

The film grossed £1.6 million in the UK and Ireland, the second highest-grossing Irish film of the year, behind The Butcher Boy. In the United States and Canada it grossed $1.2 million for a worldwide estimated total of $3.8 million.

The film garnered multiple awards for Gleeson's performance and Boorman's directing, with some critics speculating the former would earn an Academy Award nomination. Boorman won the award for Best Director at the 1998 Cannes Film Festival. Though Gleeson was not nominated for an Oscar, his performance was awarded by the Boston Society of Film Critics, the London Film Critics' Circle, and the Irish Film and Television Academy.

== Awards and nominations ==
Award	Category	Nominee	Result	Ref.
Boston Society of Film Critics Awards	Best Director	John Boorman	Won	
Boston Society of Film Critics Awards	Best Actor	Brendan Gleeson (also for I Went Down)	Won	
Cannes Film Festival	Best Director	John Boorman	Won	
Cannes Film Festival	Palme d'Or	John Boorman	Nominated	
Chicago Film Critics Society Awards	Best Director	John Boorman	Nominated	
Evening Standard British Film Awards	Best Film	John Boorman	Won	
Ft. Lauderdale International Film Festival	Best Film	John Boorman	Won	
Independent Spirit Awards	Best Foreign Film	John Boorman	Nominated	
Irish Film and Television Awards	Best Feature Film		Won	
Irish Film and Television Awards	Best Actor in a Male Role	Brendan Gleeson	Won	
Irish Film and Television Awards	Best Screenplay	John Boorman	Nominated	
Irish Film and Television Awards	Best Craft Contribution	Seamus Deasy (photography)	Nominated	
London Critics Circle Film Awards	British Actor of the Year	Brendan Gleeson	Won	
London Critics Circle Film Awards	British Director of the Year	John Boorman	Won	
Los Angeles Film Critics Association Awards	Best Director	John Boorman	Nominated	
Los Angeles Film Critics Association Awards	Best Cinematography	Seamus Deasy	Nominated	
National Society of Film Critics Awards	Best Actor	Brendan Gleeson (also for I Went Down)	Nominated	
National Society of Film Critics Awards	Best Cinematography	Seamus Deasy	Nominated	
New York Film Critics Circle Awards	Best Actor	Brendan Gleeson	Nominated	
Santa Fe Film Critics Circle Awards	Best Actor	Brendan Gleeson	Won	
Satellite Awards	Best Motion Picture, Drama	John Boorman	Nominated	
Satellite Awards	Best Director	John Boorman	Nominated	
Satellite Awards	Best Actor in a Motion Picture, Drama	Brendan Gleeson	Nominated	

== See also ==
- List of films featuring diabetes
