= Martin Foley (criminal) =

Irish criminal

Martin "The Viper" Foley (born 24 November 1952) is an Irish criminal. He rose from petty crime to become an associate of Martin Cahill. Foley has 40 convictions, and is considered a key figure in the McCormack-Foley crime family from Crumlin, Dublin. He has had several attempts on his life including being shot on five occasions, most recently on 26 January 2008. Foley was shot a number of times outside the Carlisle gym on Kimmage Road West, South Dublin. The men behind the attack were involved in a separate gun feud, which has since run its course because the main players are all either dead or in prison. Foley has kept a lower profile since then.

== Early life and family ==
He was born in Derry and was one of five children of a couple who moved south to live in Crumlin. He is an uncle of James Quinn.

== Criminal career ==
A well known Dublin gangland criminal, Foley's first conviction was in 1968. Since then he has been a member of Martin Cahill's criminal gang, and jailed for numerous offences including breaking a police officer's jaw.

In 1982 John Traynor shared information on O'Connor's jewellery manufacturing in Harold's Cross with Cahill and his gang. In summer 1983 Cahill and Foley were key figures in a ten member gang who took staff hostage and stole £2 million worth of jewels.

In 1984, the Concerned Parents Against Drugs group claimed that Foley and associates of dealing drugs. In response Martin Cahill set up Concerned Criminals Action Committee, which was led by Foley. They marched on homes of the Concerned Parents and eventually a truce was reached.

Paddy Shanahan, a criminal from County Kildare approached Foley about stealing paintings from the collection of Sir Alfred Beit. In May that year the Cahill gang stole from the collection a total of £30 million worth of paintings.

An attack on 26 January 2008 was the fourth time Foley has been shot; in 1995 outside Fatima Mansions, in 1996 by the convicted murderer Brian Meehan, and in 2000 as he left a swimming pool in Terenure. This shooting is believed to be linked to the Crumlin-Drimnagh feud, with Foley aligned to one of the feuding gangs. He was also abducted by the Provisional IRA in 1984, but escaped following a shoot-out in Phoenix Park between the kidnappers and Gardaí.

In 2017 a brother of Seán Dunne was awarded €10,000 by a High Court judge as a result of intimidation of him and his family by a "debt collection agency" run by Foley.

In 2025 he was ordered to pay the Criminal Assets Bureau over €1 million in outstanding tax or lose the home he lives in with his wife and daughter. He was assessed as owing €916,960.12 in unpaid taxes from 1993 to 2000 plus interest. The judge gave him 18 months to pay the unpaid taxes and refused an application to allow the family to remain until his daughter turns 18. The case has lasted over a decade.

In September 2026 he began a legal case in the High Court to challenge the attempt by the Criminal Assets Bureau to seize and sell his home.
