= Vera Klute =

Contemporary artist based in Ireland

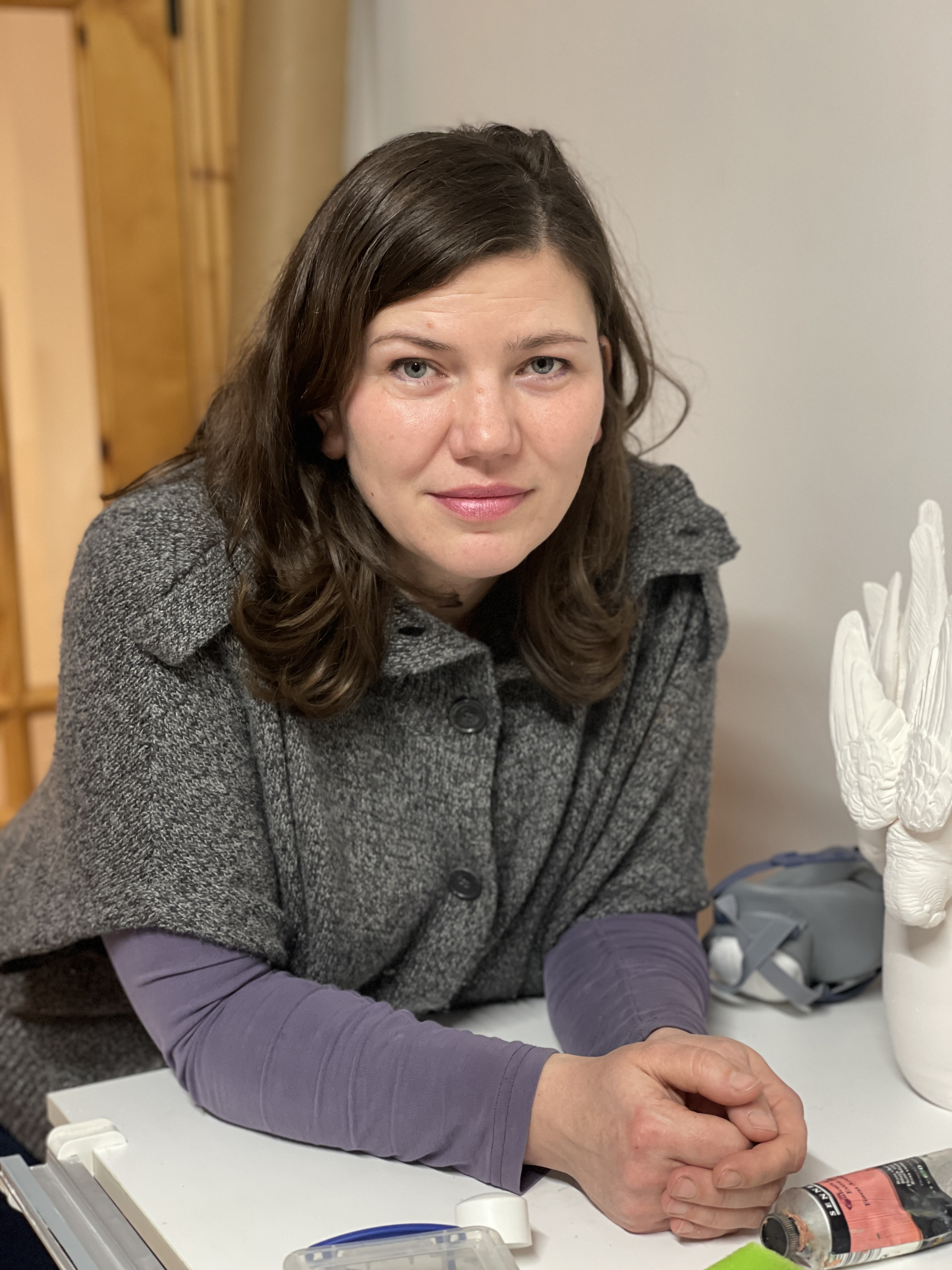
- Artist Vera Klute
- Born: 1981 (age 44–45); Salzkotten, Germany
- Education: IADT
- Known for: Sculpture, Painting, Drawing, Kinetic Art, Video Animation
- Notable work: Portraits of Sr Stanislaus Kennedy and Garry Hynes in the National Gallery, an oversized sculpture of Luke Kelly situated in Dublin 1.
- Style: Figurative Art
- Movement: Contemporary Art
- Awards: Anita Young Bursary 2022, Hanley Sustainability Energy 2021, Solomon Fine Art Award for Sculpture 2020, Hennessy Portrait Prize 2015, National Gallery of Ireland; Hennessy Craig Scholarship 2015, K+M Evans Award for Painting 2013, Emerging Visual Artist Award 2009
- Elected: Royal Hibernian Academy (RHA)
- Website: www.veraklute.net

Vera Klute ARHA (born 1981 in Germany) is a contemporary artist based in Ireland since 2001.

== Biography ==
Vera Klute was born in 1981 in Salzkotten, Germany. Klute moved to Ireland in 2001 and attended Dún Laoghaire Institute of Art, Design and Technology, graduating in 2006. After living and working in Dublin for 20 years, she moved to Co. Kilkenny in 2021. She was elected as Associate Member of the RHA in 2018 und is a full member since 2023.

== Work ==
Vera Klute works in a variety of media, from painting to sculpture, kinetics, drawing and video animation. Fundamentally, she draws, and in a way drawing underpins her use of painting, photography, collage, video, carving, modelling, construction, tapestry, ceramics and even taxidermy.

== Exhibitions ==
Klute has had a number of solo exhibitions: Wexford Arts Centre (2009), Butler Gallery (2011), QSS Gallery (2014), the LAB and Royal Hibernian Academy (RHA) Ashford (2014), and The Molesworth Gallery (2016, 2020, 2022). She had her first major survey show at the Gallagher Gallery RHA in 2017. She had a 2-person show at Limerick City Gallery in 2021.

She has exhibited in numerous group shows including the National Gallery of Ireland, the Butler Gallery, VISUAL Carlow, the Royal Ulster Academy, Tampere Art Museum, Reina Sofia national museum and Haus der Kulturen der Welt.

== Collections ==
Klute's portrait of Sr Stanislaus Kennedy was added to the National Portrait Collection in the National Gallery of Ireland (NGI) in 2014. She was also commissioned by the National Gallery to create a bust of Garry Hynes. A self-portrait of Klute was selected for inclusion in the National Self-portrait Collection of Ireland, and she won the Hennessy Portrait Prize at the NGI in 2015. Klute was commissioned by the Royal Irish Academy in 2017 to create a set of four portraits for their Women on Walls initiative. The portraits were of Françoise Henry, Sheila Tinney, Phyllis Clinch and Eleanor Knott. In 2018, she was elected an Associate Member of the RHA. In 2018 Klute's bust of Irish architect and designer Eileen Gray was unveiled in Roquebrune Cap Martin. In January 2019, Klute's sculpture of Luke Kelly was unveiled on Sheriff Street, Dublin having won the commission for work under a competition established the then Lord Mayor of Dublin, Christy Burke.

She was one of four artists that received a commission in 2020 to create the first female busts for the Library of Trinity College Dublin's Long Room. Her bust of Rosalind Franklin was unveiled in 2023.

== Awards ==
She won the Hennessy Craig Scholarship in 2015 from the RHA. Klute has been the recipient of the Arts Council Bursary Awards in 2008, 2009, 2011, 2013, 2019. She has also been awarded the Emerging Visual Artist Award from the Wexford Arts Centre in 2009 and the K+M Evans Award in 2013, the Solomon Fine Art Award for Sculpture in 2020, the Hanley Sustainability Energy Award in 2021 and the Anita Young Bursary in 2022.

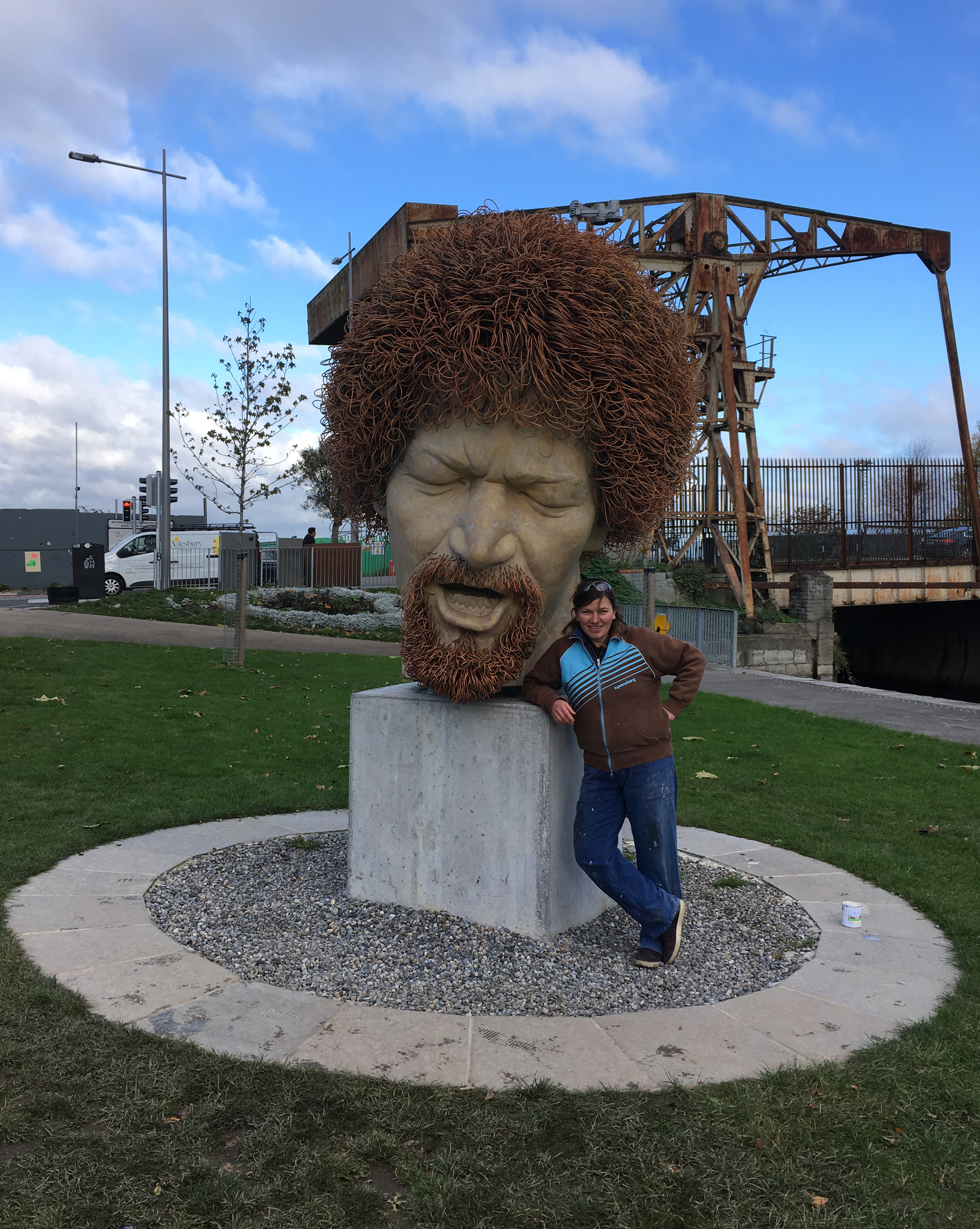
Vera Klute beside her sculpture of Luke Kelly
