= Françoise Henry =

Art historian

- Born: 16 June 1902; Paris, France
- Died: 10 February 1982 (aged 79); Auxerre, France
- Resting place: Lindry, France
- Known for: Scholar of early Irish art

Françoise Henry (16 June 1902 – 10 February 1982) was a scholar of early Irish art, archaeologist, and art historian. While at University College Dublin (UCD), she founded the Department of History of European Painting in 1965, and was head until she retired in 1974.

== Early life and education ==
Henry was born in Paris on 16 June 1902, and brought up in Limousin. She was the only child of Jeanne Henry (née Clément) and René Henry, deputy chef de cabinet to the president of the French Chamber of Deputies, professor at l'École des Sciences Politiques, and writer. Her father left the family when Henry was young. Henry's grandfather, Charles Clément (1821 - 1887), was an art writer and philosopher, and his influence was felt through Henry's visits to her grandmother near Paris.

Henry attended the Lycée Molière in Paris from 1914 to 1920, and then graduated from both the École du Louvre in 1925 and the Sorbonne. Whilst at the Sorbonne, Henry attended lectures by Salomon Reinach, Robert Rey, and Henri Hubert. She worked as an assistant to Hubert in the Musée des Antiquités Nationales, going on to join the staff in 1927. One of her theses was a full survey of prehistoric burials in the Côte d'Or. During this time one of her teachers, Henri Focillon, became a mentor to Henry.

== Career ==
She first came to Ireland in 1926 while starting a thesis for the École du Louvre on Irish medieval carving. From this visit, she became inspired to study early Irish monuments, being particularly taken by the high crosses at Ahenny. When she returned to Paris, Focillon encouraged her to pursue her study of Irish carvings. She went on to receive her doctorate on the subject in 1932. She published La sculpture irlandaise pendant les douze premiers siècles de l'ère chrétienne in 1933, with a dedication to Focillon. The volume was recognised as the primary reference immediately. For the next few years the Federation of University Women scholarships enabled Henry to travel and study. She travelled to Ireland often, but also to Scotland and parts of Scandinavia. She was part of growing number of scholars looking at Celtic studies, and benefited from that revival. Whilst in Dublin she lived in Trinity Hall.

She worked for UCD from 1932 to 1974, with her first appointment being to the French department in 1932. Her first major work, Irish art in the early Christian period, was published in 1940, and focused on an area of study largely untouched since Margaret Stokes in the 1800s. The book charts Irish art from the prehistoric up to the twelfth century, covering sculpture, manuscripts, and metalwork. In the 1960s, it was expanded and updated to three volumes, published first in French and then English.

From 1934, Henry was appointed by to teach the Purser–Griffith scholarship lectures on the history of European painting. She transferred to the department of archaeology from French in 1948, going on to become the director of studies in archaeology and the history of European painting. Amongst the scholars that she collaborated with were Cecil Curle and Geneviève Marsh-Micheli. Through UCD she worked alongside Eoin MacNeill, R. A. Stewart Macalister, Gerard Murphy, Seán P. Ó Ríordáin, and Rúaidhrí de Valera. Amongst her close friends with whom she shared mutual research interests were Máirín Bean Uí Dhálaigh, Mairín Allen, and Frank O'Connor.

During World War II, she was involved in the evacuation of objects from French and London museums, acting as the secretary of the commission for the preservation of works of art in occupied Europe. Later in the war she worked in a war factory in England, going on to serve as an ambulance driver in France from 1944. For this work, she received the Legion of Honour in 1947.

From 1946, Henry resumed her field work, recording monuments and some excavations at sites such as at the Inishkea Islands and Glendalough. As a result of her work, the department of archaeology held a photographic archive documenting early Irish Christian art as well as comparative material. Her most noted works, and those best known by the wider public, were Early Christian Irish art (1954), Irish high crosses (1964), and Book of Kells (1974). Upon her retirement from UCD in 1974, a special issue of Studies was dedicated to her. Aside from her archaeological work, Henry was also involved in the contemporary arts. She organised a major retrospective of the work of Mainie Jellett in 1962, as well as acting as an advisor to a number of bodies, sitting on the councils of the friends of national institutions, and on the board of guardians of the National Gallery of Ireland from 1962.

Henry was one of the first four women to become members of the Royal Irish Academy (RIA) in 1949. She received an honorary doctorate from Dublin University in 1963, and from the National University of Ireland. After her retirement, Henry continued to split her time between Ireland and France. She died in Auxerre on 10 February 1982.

== Legacy ==
Henry's papers are deposited in the RIA, the UCD Archives, and some in private ownership. A bust of Henry was carved in Cashel sandstone by Domhnall Ó Murchadha in 1982. A reading room in UCD's School of Art History and Cultural Policy is named in her honour, and contains a dedicated art history library. She was amongst a group of eminent Irish scholars who were celebrated as part of the RIA's Women on Walls exhibition.

In 2016, alongside the physicist Sheila Tinney, the scientist Phyllis Clinch, and the literary scholar Eleanor Knott, Henry was included in the "Women on Walls Project" which featured the first four women to be members of the RIA. On Friday 2 June 2017 a special symposium was held to honour Henry. An exhibition of her original papers, notes, journals and sketches titled "Françoise Henry and the history of Irish art" was held in the RIA. In April 2018 a Library Lunchtime Lecture was held in the Royal Irish Academy, titled "Françoise Henry at UCD: Towards a history of Art History in Ireland", while a collection of her textual and visual material can be found in the archives of University College Dublin.

Her photographic contributions to the Conway Library were, as of 2020, being digitised by the Courtauld Institute of Art as part of the Courtauld Connects project.

== Selected publications ==
- Henry, Françoise (31 December 1936). "Hanging Bowls". The Journal of the Royal Society of Antiquaries of Ireland. 7th. VI (II). Royal Society of Antiquaries of Ireland: 209–246. JSTOR i25513824.
- Henry, Francoise (1965-1970) Irish Art. Three Volumes. (1) In the Early Christian Period to A.D. 800 (2) During the Viking Invasions 800-1020 A.D. (3) In the Romanesque Period 1020-1170 A.D. New York: Cornell University Press, 1965, '65, 70. Uniform set. Pictorial dust jackets
- T. Marquardt, Janet published/edited "Francoise Henry in County Mayo: The Inishkea Journals" in 2012
