= Concerned Parents Against Drugs =

- Abbreviation: CPAD
- Successor: Coalition of Communities Against Drugs (COCAD)
- Formation: 1982
- Founder: Christy Burke, Fr Jim Smyth
- Founded at: Hardwicke Street flats, Dublin, Ireland
- Dissolved: late 1980s (activity declined; successor movements emerged in the 1990s)
- Type: Community organisation; anti-drugs movement
- Purpose: Opposition to heroin dealing in working-class Dublin communities
- Region served: Dublin
- Methods: Public meetings, marches, patrols, evictions, surveillance
- Key people: Christy Burke; Fr Jim Smyth; John "Whacker" Humphrey; Tony Gregory; Fergus McCabe; John Noonan
- Affiliations: Sinn Féin (partial), Provisional IRA (partial)

Concerned Parents Against Drugs (CPAD) was a community-based anti-heroin movement that emerged in Dublin, Ireland, in the early 1980s. Formed initially by residents of the Hardwicke Street flats in the north inner city, the movement spread rapidly to working-class areas across the city in response to what activists and later commentators described as a heroin epidemic that the Garda Síochána and the state were failing to address. CPAD organised public meetings, patrols, and marches on the homes of alleged drug dealers, and in many cases physically evicted dealers from their flats. The movement was controversial, attracting both popular support in the communities it operated in and hostility from the Garda Síochána, the press, and politicians, who characterised it as vigilantism and, because of the involvement of some Sinn Féin and Provisional IRA members, as an Irish republican front.

== Background ==
Heroin began to appear in Dublin in significant quantities in the late 1970s, when Larry Dunne and members of his family began large-scale importation of the drug into the city. The problem was concentrated in areas already affected by high unemployment following the decline of traditional industries, including the Dublin docks, where the introduction of containerisation had eliminated large numbers of jobs. A 1981 survey by social worker Barry Cullen and a local development committee found that of 340 residents of St Teresa's Gardens, a flat complex in Dublin 8, 63 were addicted to heroin and 44 families had at least one addict. A government-commissioned study, the Bradshaw Report of 1983, confirmed the scale of addiction in the north inner city and linked it to poverty and inequality, but according to Cullen the report was suppressed by the government of the day. Christy Burke, later a central figure in the movement, recalled that the then Minister for Health, Barry Desmond, responded to concerns about rising drug deaths by asking, "What epidemic?"

== Formation ==
=== Hardwicke Street ===
In 1982, Fr Jim Smyth, a Jesuit priest living in the Hardwicke Street flats in Dublin's north inner city, approached Christy Burke, a local Sinn Féin activist and IRA member, for help after mothers in the flats reported that their children were using heroin on the stairwells. Burke later recalled the priest telling him: "I don't agree with the Provos' policies, but all of the women in the flats respect you and we need your help. The place is riddled with drugs". At the resulting meeting, made up largely of mothers and fathers from the flats, Burke suggested the name "Concerned Parents", reportedly telling the group, "Why don't we call ourselves 'Concerned Parents' because that's what ye are". Burke later described the gathering as "a room full of mammies and daddies with an IRA activist and a priest".

That night, the group approached four known dealers in the flats; three agreed to stop dealing, while the fourth was physically evicted by the group, who removed his possessions from his flat.

=== St Teresa's Gardens and Dolphin House ===
A similar movement developed independently in St Teresa's Gardens on the south side of the city. Following a community play, "Fight Back", staged in June 1983, residents held a public meeting on 13 June 1983 at which around 70 people discussed how to confront local dealers. By September 1983, only three families remained openly pushing heroin in the flats; a subsequent meeting voted to give them a week to leave, and when they refused to go voluntarily, around 300 residents formed a human chain to remove their furniture from the flats. A "Victory Dance" was held to mark the occasion. Residents of the nearby Dolphin House complex followed the same approach shortly afterwards, with the assistance of the St Teresa's Gardens committee, and the complex was reported to be "drug free" within weeks. A public meeting in Fatima Mansions in August 1983, called by a local priest, drew so many people that it had to be held outdoors.

== Growth and organisational structure ==
Following the example set in Hardwicke Street and St Teresa's Gardens, similar community groups formed across Dublin during 1983 and 1984, including in Ballyfermot, Clondalkin, Crumlin, Cabra, Dun Laoghaire, Sallynoggin, Bray, Finglas South, Inchicore, Cathedral View, and eight separate areas of Tallaght. A 1988 sociological study of the movement noted that CPAD described itself as an anti-heroin, rather than a general anti-drugs, movement, with other substances such as alcohol and cannabis generally not targeted by the campaign.

According to the same study, the movement was structured around a weekly Central Committee, made up of two representatives from each affiliated local group, and an Executive Committee that handled specialised administrative tasks, though day-to-day activity remained largely decentralised, with each local group maintaining its own approach. Local committees organised citizen patrols, ran public meetings (typically held in local church halls), and gathered information from residents, addicts' families, and people in occupations that gave them a vantage point over street activity, such as taxi drivers, shop assistants, and postal workers. Suspected dealers were named at public meetings and invited to respond; the study's author reported that a number of dealers publicly confessed and undertook to stop dealing, though it also noted that confession was sometimes used by dealers as an easy way to defuse pressure without necessarily halting their activity.

On 29 February 1984, an estimated 4,000 Concerned Parents Against Drugs members and relatives of those affected by drug use marched along O'Connell Street to Government Buildings, where they handed in a letter outlining the movement's objectives. A central committee of community-based drugs action groups had been formed by this point to coordinate information between areas, including on dealers who moved locations after being evicted from one part of the city.

== Involvement of republicans ==
From an early stage, members of Sinn Féin and the Provisional IRA were involved in Concerned Parents Against Drugs, including Burke, Tony Gregory (an independent TD with a republican socialist background), and John Noonan, a Sinn Féin activist in Tallaght who chaired the Tallaght Drugs Action Committee, formed in November 1983. According to a review of André Lyder's history of the movement, the belief among criminals that CPAD was intrinsically linked to the IRA (described by Lyder as "the big bluff") had the effect of deterring some dealers from using violence against activists, for fear of republican retaliation. Burke has said that he specifically sought a public statement of IRA protection for activists after they came under threat, and that a statement was issued warning that any dealer who interfered with community activists would be "severely dealt with".

The involvement of republicans made the movement a target of media suspicion; the Irish Independent ran a story headlined "Ex-cons head anti-drugs crusade", highlighting the prison records of some CPAD figures. Academic and journalistic accounts of the movement have generally concluded that, while republicans played an important organisational role, particularly in the absence of support from other parties, the wider movement drew its membership from a broad cross-section of affected communities rather than being controlled by Sinn Féin. Fergus McCabe, an activist in the north inner city, has said the movement there involved "a broader coalition" than elsewhere in the city. Because of his IRA membership, Burke was banned from commenting on the drugs issue in broadcast media under Section 31 of the Broadcasting Act during this period.

== Violence and opposition ==
The movement's activities drew violent responses from some of those it targeted. In Crumlin, a group of criminals, some associated with Martin Cahill, formed a rival organisation styling itself the "Concerned Criminals Action Committee", whose members stated publicly that they were "ordinary" criminals rather than drug pushers and objected to CPAD patrols interfering with unrelated criminal activity such as robbery. Masked men were reported to have attacked the cars and homes of Sinn Féin and CPAD activists in Crumlin in response. On 21 February 1984, a CPAD activist named Joe Flynn was shot in both legs at a flat complex in an attack Gardaí believed was ordered by a criminal group; six days later, another activist, Francis Storey, was shot with blanks from a shotgun at Hardwicke Street. In 1984, members of the IRA kidnapped Tommy Gaffney, an associate of Martin Cahill, in an incident widely linked to the anti-drugs campaign; Gaffney was released a week later.

The movement's tactics sometimes led to mistaken targeting. CPAD issued a public apology after marching on a house in Rutland Grove, Crumlin, whose occupant was not, in fact, a drug pusher. In February 1986, twelve members of CPAD from the Liberties area were charged with watching and besetting a family in Cathedral View, off Kevin Street; they testified that they had patrolled the area for fifteen months before any action was taken, in order to gather evidence of dealing. Some Garda officers were reported to be hostile to the movement; Burke recalled visiting seventeen Garda stations in a single January to check on activists who had been detained. Other Gardaí took a more favourable view; retired officer Michael Finn, who served with the Store Street drugs unit from 1985 to 1993, said the group had been "most beneficial" in curtailing heroin distribution in the north inner city and that there had been no conflict between Concerned Parents and Gardaí on the north side of the city.

In November 1987, following a mass meeting in Ballymun, a crowd marched on a flat in a tower on Seán McDermott Street and threw furniture out of a seventh-floor window. Four activists, including John "Whacker" Humphrey, were subsequently charged and tried before the non-jury Special Criminal Court in May 1989, a departure from the pattern of "not guilty" verdicts that had generally been returned by juries in earlier CPAD-related cases. The three convicted drug dealers who had lived in the flat were called as prosecution witnesses; one had recently been arrested in England on heroin charges before fleeing back to Ireland ahead of his court date, a fact that Lyder's history of the movement says caused outrage among activists. Humphrey and a second activist, Hugh Cahill, were convicted and imprisoned, and much of the movement's energy in the following period went into campaigning for their release rather than continuing direct confrontation with dealers.

== Decline ==
By the late 1980s, the pace of CPAD marches had slowed considerably. According to Fergus McCabe, this was partly a result of the state beginning to establish drug treatment services, and partly simple "tiredness" among activists after several years of sustained campaigning. However, Dublin's heroin problem worsened again in the early 1990s, driven in part by a new generation of users, some of whom began taking heroin to counter the after-effects of ecstasy use associated with the rave scene.

== Legacy ==
A new wave of community anti-drugs activity emerged in Dublin from the mid-1990s, organised under groups including the Inner City Organisations Network (Icon) on the north side and the Coalition of Communities Against Drugs (COCAD) on the south side, as well as local groups such as Tallaght Against Drug Dealers and Cabra Communities Against Drugs. Some academic accounts treat CPAD and COCAD as two phases of the same broader social movement. This second wave of activism was also marked by violence, including the killing of heroin addict Josie Dwyer after an anti-drugs meeting in Dolphin's Barn in 1996. The renewed campaigning of the 1990s coincided with policy changes including the 1996 Rabbitte Report, which led to the creation of the Inter-Agency Drugs Project and local Drugs Task Forces, developments that took place against the backdrop of the murder of journalist Veronica Guerin the same year.

André Lyder, a former CPAD/COCAD spokesperson, later described the movement as "one of the most significant social movements to emerge from Dublin's working-class communities" in his account of its history, Pushers Out. A contemporary sociological study of the movement's investigative methods, conducted with unusual access to CPAD's Central and Executive Committee meetings, concluded that the group's procedures for establishing the guilt of suspected dealers were "systematic and exhaustive" and found no instance during the period studied in which the movement had wrongly evicted or harassed an innocent person, though the author acknowledged this was a narrow assessment that did not address the movement's broader activities.

Concern about drug crime in Dublin's inner city has persisted in subsequent decades. In 2023, a former CPAD member, identified only as Ken, told Newstalk that drug crime in the area was "worse now than it's ever been", despite decades of state investment in treatment services. John "Whacker" Humphrey, one of the movement's founding figures in St Teresa's Gardens, died in 2024; his funeral at St Theresa's Church on Donore Avenue drew hundreds of mourners, and he was remembered by Christy Burke as a "man of peace" whose actions had been "justified" because "the State had failed the communities".
