= Paul Williams (Irish journalist) =

Irish journalist (born 1964)

- Born: 15 December 1964 (age 61)
- Occupation: Journalist
- Notable credit(s): Dirty Money: The Story of the Criminal Assets Bureau; Paul Williams Investigates—The Battle for the Gas Fields

Paul Williams (born 1964) is an Irish journalist writing mainly about crime. He has worked for the Irish Independent since 2012, and previously for the Sunday World (1986–2010), the Irish News of the World (2010–2011), and the Irish Sun (2011–2012). He has also written books and presented television programmes.

== Early and personal life ==
Williams went to school in County Leitrim, in Ballinamore and then Carrigallen. He moved to Dublin in 1984 to study journalism at the Rathmines College of Commerce. With his wife, Ann, he has two children.

== Newspaper work ==
=== Sunday World ===
After the 1996 murder of Veronica Guerin, Williams took over from her as crime correspondent of the Sunday World. According to the newspaper's website, he maintained a vast archive of background material.

On 11 June 1999, Williams' report on the conviction of nun Nora Wall for child rape made an allegation not made in the trial, that Wall had procured children for paedophile priest Brendan Smyth. Wall's conviction was quickly overturned and later ruled as a miscarriage of justice. In 2002 the Sunday World settled a libel case by paying Wall €175,000 and printing a retraction and apology.

In an April 2000 article during the murder trial of Catherine Nevin, Williams alleged a witness had boasted to him of his sexual relationship with Nevin. The man sued in 2000 for defamation, but the case was dismissed in 2014 as there had been too long a delay, no action having occurred between 2002 and 2010.

Williams' Sunday World salary was €145,000 in 2010.

=== News of the World ===
In January 2010, after receiving what he described as "a substantial offer", Williams left the Sunday World, where he had worked for 23 years, and joined the Irish News of the World as its crime editor. The Sunday World took out an injunction in the High Court to prevent him from taking up his new position until his three months' notice to leave had expired. The dispute was later settled.

=== The Irish Sun ===
After the closure of the News of the World due to a phone hacking scandal, Williams joined fellow News International paper The Irish Sun in October 2011.

=== Irish Independent ===
Since 2012, he has contributed to the Irish Independent. There, under the title of "Special Correspondent", he writes primarily on crime.

== Books ==
The General, Williams' 1995 biography of Martin Cahill, was made into a 1998 movie directed by John Boorman. His 2014 book Murder Inc prompted protests from some Limerick residents who said it promoted an outdated negative stereotype of the city as crime-ridden. Other crime books include Gangland (1998), Evil Empire (2001), Crimelords (2003), The Untouchables (2006), Crime Wars (2008), and Badfellas (2011).

Williams also ghost-wrote Secret Love, Phyllis Hamilton's 1995 account of her 20-year affair with Michael Cleary, a high-profile Catholic priest.

== Television ==
Dirty Money: The Story of the Criminal Assets Bureau, a six-part TV series on the history of the Criminal Assets Bureau by Paul Williams, began in January 2008 on TV3; it won Best Documentary at that year's TV Now Awards.

In Paul Williams Investigates—The Battle for the Gas Fields aired in June 2009 on TV3, Williams reported on the Corrib gas controversy. Reviews in the Irish Independent and The Irish Times said Williams was unsympathetic to those arrested for protesting against Royal Dutch Shell's planned gas processing plant. The Broadcasting Complaints Commission rejected complaints of bias on the grounds that the broadcast gave a fair opportunity for both sides to have their say.

== Radio ==
As a guest on Liveline in 2007, Williams denied Christy Burke's allegation that he was trying to link Sinn Féin and the Provisional IRA with the criminal underworld. Then criminals Alan Bradley and John Daly phoned in (the latter from Portlaoise Prison) to deny Williams' claim that they were feuding with each other.

Williams was the Newstalk breakfast show as a co-presenter from 2016 to 2018.
