= Dirty Money: The Story of the Criminal Assets Bureau =

- Starring: Paul Williams
- Voices of: Paul Williams
- Narrated by: Paul Williams
- Country of origin: Ireland
- Original language: English
- No. of episodes: 6

Production
- Running time: 60 mins (including commercials)

Original release
- Network: TV3
- Release: 25 February – 3 April 2008

Dirty Money: The Story of the Criminal Assets Bureau is an Irish crime program broadcast on TV3 at 10 p.m. on Monday nights. The show began on 25 February and ended on 3 April 2008. The series comprised six one-hour episodes examining the role of the Criminal Assets Bureau (CAB). The program was presented and narrated by the then Sunday World journalist Paul Williams. Williams explores what led to the establishment of the multi-agency Bureau and interviews the people who played a big part in the formation of the bureau.

The series was released on DVD in the run up to Christmas 2008. The programme began a repeat broadcast on 6 January 2009, ending on 9 February 2009.

== Episodes ==
Twelve episodes were made:

1. State of Fear - Establishment of the Bureau, including the murder of Veronica Guerin
2. The CAB operation against John Gilligan, his assets and his gang
3. Starting Days of CAB and more on Veronica Guerin'
4. CAB operation against tax-dodger Ray Burke
5. Operation Alpha, the CAB operation against bank robber Gerry Hutch
6. Big Guns, seizing the assets of the IRA
7. Cleared for Payoff
8. Spring into Action
9. Coffin Up Big Bucks
10. New York State of Find
11. Life in the Cash Lane
12. Brite Ideas
