= Christy Burke =

Irish politician (born 1948)

Cllr Christy Burke
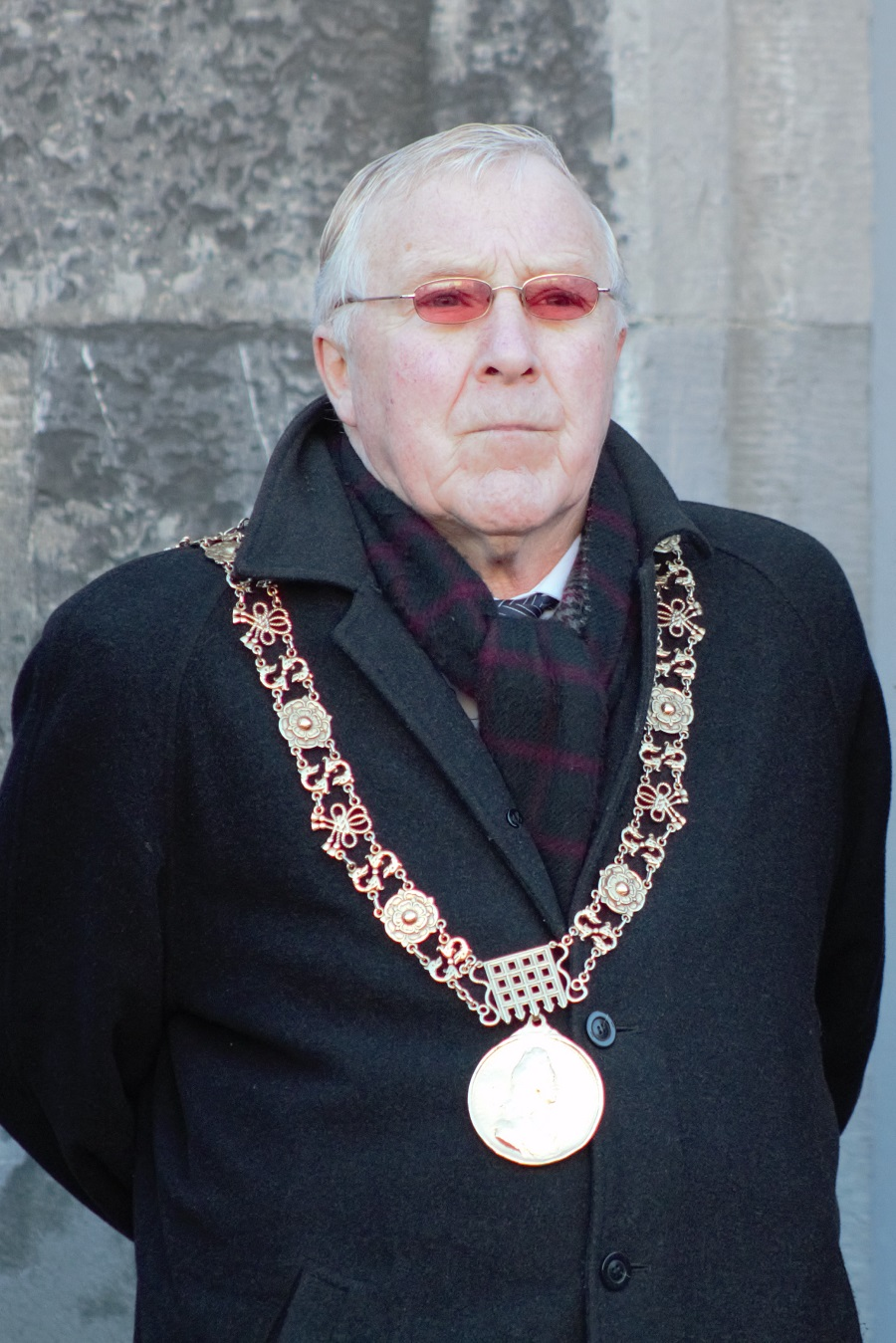
- Burke in 2015, wearing the chain of the Lord Mayor of Dublin

Dublin City Councillor
- Incumbent
- Assumed office 20 June 1985
- Constituency: North Inner City

Lord Mayor of Dublin
- In office 6 June 2014 – June 2015
- Preceded by: Oisín Quinn
- Succeeded by: Críona Ní Dhálaigh

Personal details
- Born: 1948 (age 77–78) Lurgan Street, Dublin
- Party: Independent; Sinn Féin (to 2009)

Christopher Burke (born 1948) is an independent Irish politician who has served as a Dublin City Councillor for the north inner city since 1985, and as Lord Mayor of Dublin from 2014 to 2015. A former member of the Provisional Irish Republican Army, he served prison sentences on IRA membership charges in the 1970s before becoming involved in anti-drugs activism with the Concerned Parents Against Drugs movement in the early 1980s. He was first elected to Dublin City Council for Sinn Féin in 1985, and remained the party's sole city councillor for around fifteen years, before leaving Sinn Féin in 2009 following an unsuccessful bid for the Dublin Central Dáil seat. He has stood unsuccessfully for the Dáil ten times between 1982 and 2020. Burke has been associated with campaigning on homelessness and addiction in Dublin's north inner city, and was elected for a sixth term on the council at the 2024 Dublin City Council election.

== Early life ==
Burke was born in 1948 and reared in a one-room tenement house on Lurgan Street in Dublin's north inner city, one of 13 children, several of whom died in infancy due to tuberculosis and poor living conditions. He has recalled going hungry as a child and searching a bin at the rear of the tenement for food. His father was an electrician who suffered ill health, while his mother often had to find work herself. The family later moved to a two-bedroom flat on Halston Street, an improvement Burke has described as a significant moment for the family, as it came with a toilet, a fireplace and windows that opened.

As a boy, Burke joined the youth organisation Na Fianna Éireann at his mother's request. He left school at the age of 14 to take up employment and has said he began drinking heavily from a young age, requiring several periods of hospital treatment and detoxification. He married at 17, but the marriage ended in separation when he was 33. Burke, who has spoken publicly about his recovery from alcoholism, has said he stopped drinking following a period of treatment in 1979.

== Irish Republican Army involvement ==
Burke sided with the Provisional Irish Republican Army in the 1970 split in Sinn Féin and the IRA. He was first jailed in 1971, having been arrested at a training camp in Ranelagh on a charge of IRA membership. He served two prison sentences in Portlaoise Prison on IRA membership charges during the 1970s, having initially been held in Mountjoy Prison before his transfer. Burke has said that eighteen days after completing one such sentence, he was rearrested and charged with IRA membership and possession of firearms, though the firearms charge was subsequently dropped; he also received a six-month sentence for lowering an Irish tricolour during a Bloody Sunday commemoration event at the Garden of Remembrance. By his own account, Burke rejoined the IRA upon leaving prison.

In 1996, he was awarded £7,500 for the distress caused by false statements after a member of the Garda Special Branch had told Burke he was in danger of being assassinated.

He was involved in negotiations during the Northern Ireland peace process in the 1990s and supported the IRA ceasefires.

== Political career ==
=== Anti-drugs activism and early political career ===
In the early 1980s, Burke became involved in local politics and in anti-illegal drug trade activism in Dublin's north inner city. He co-founded the Concerned Parents Against Drugs movement with a Jesuit priest, Fr. Jim Smith, after being approached by mothers in the Hardwicke Street flats whose children were using heroin. The movement confronted local drug dealers directly, warning them to cease dealing or leave their communities, and Burke has described it as a response to a lack of Garda action against dealers at the time. He also criticised the Garda Síochána for their treatment of fellow activists. Burke stood unsuccessfully in the 1982 by-election, receiving over 2,000 first-preference votes.

He was first elected to Dublin City Council at the 1985 Dublin Corporation election, and for around fifteen years was the only Sinn Féin councillor sitting in City Hall.

In 1986, he, Tony Gregory and Joe Costello were jailed for fourteen days for campaigning on behalf of Moore Street traders.

In August 1998, Burke served as deputy Lord Mayor of Dublin, deputising for Lord Mayor Joe Doyle at the reopening of the Ormond Square housing project in the north inner city, the area where Burke was born and raised; he was reported at the time to be the first Sinn Féin member to hold the deputy mayoral role.

=== 2009 Dublin Central by-election and departure from Sinn Féin ===
In May 2009, Sinn Féin selected Burke, unopposed and as its longest-serving councillor, to contest the Dublin Central by-election caused by the death of independent TD Tony Gregory, with Mary Lou McDonald backing him as "the best left-wing candidate" in the field. Other candidates included Fine Gael's Paschal Donohoe, Labour's Ivana Bacik, Fianna Fáil's Maurice Ahern (a brother of former Taoiseach Bertie Ahern) and independent Maureen O'Sullivan.

The by-election was held on the same day as the 2009 European elections. Burke lost to O'Sullivan, receiving 3,770 first-preference votes, equivalent to 13.3 per cent. He retained his council seat in the concurrent local elections but resigned from Sinn Féin three days later, saying his constituents would be best served by the "freedom" of an independent. Burke said he had considered leaving the party for over a year, and cited what he felt was insufficient funding and campaign support during the by-election as contributing factors.

His departure led to criticism from Aengus Ó Snodaigh, chair of the party's Dublin branch, who said Burke had been promoted during the campaign as Sinn Féin's longest-serving councillor and called for the seat to be returned to the party.

In 2010, the Sunday World newspaper was forced by the High Court to apologise to Burke for a May 2007 article by crime reporter Paul Williams, published during the campaigning period for that year's general election, that falsely accused him of knowing a criminal by the name of Christy Griffin, as well as accusing him of lying about knowing Griffin.

=== Dáil election attempts ===
Burke ran for the Dáil in Dublin Central ten times between 1982 and 2020, as well as in two by-elections, but was never elected. In the 1989 general election he missed out on a seat by 743 votes.

Ahead of the 2016 general election, which he described at the time as his final attempt at the Dáil, Burke said his profile had been raised by his year as Lord Mayor, though a reduction of the Dublin Central constituency from four seats to three worked against him. He faced competition from Sinn Féin's Mary Lou McDonald, Fine Gael's Paschal Donohoe and independent Maureen O'Sullivan, who were regarded as the frontrunners for the constituency's three seats.

=== Lord Mayor of Dublin (2014–2015) ===
Burke was elected Lord Mayor of Dublin for the 2014 to 2015 term on 6 June 2014, after a planned arrangement to rotate the office among the council's five largest groupings collapsed when Fine Gael and Fianna Fáil withdrew from negotiations. Sinn Féin, then the largest grouping on Dublin City Council with 16 of its 63 seats, instead formed a coalition with the Labour Party, the Green Party and 11 independent councillors, under which the mayoralty rotated between the groupings, allowing Sinn Féin to hold the office through the 1916 centenary commemorations in 2016. On taking office, Burke said he would prioritise homelessness, housing, illegal dumping and services for people with disabilities, and called for the prosecution of illegal dumpers.

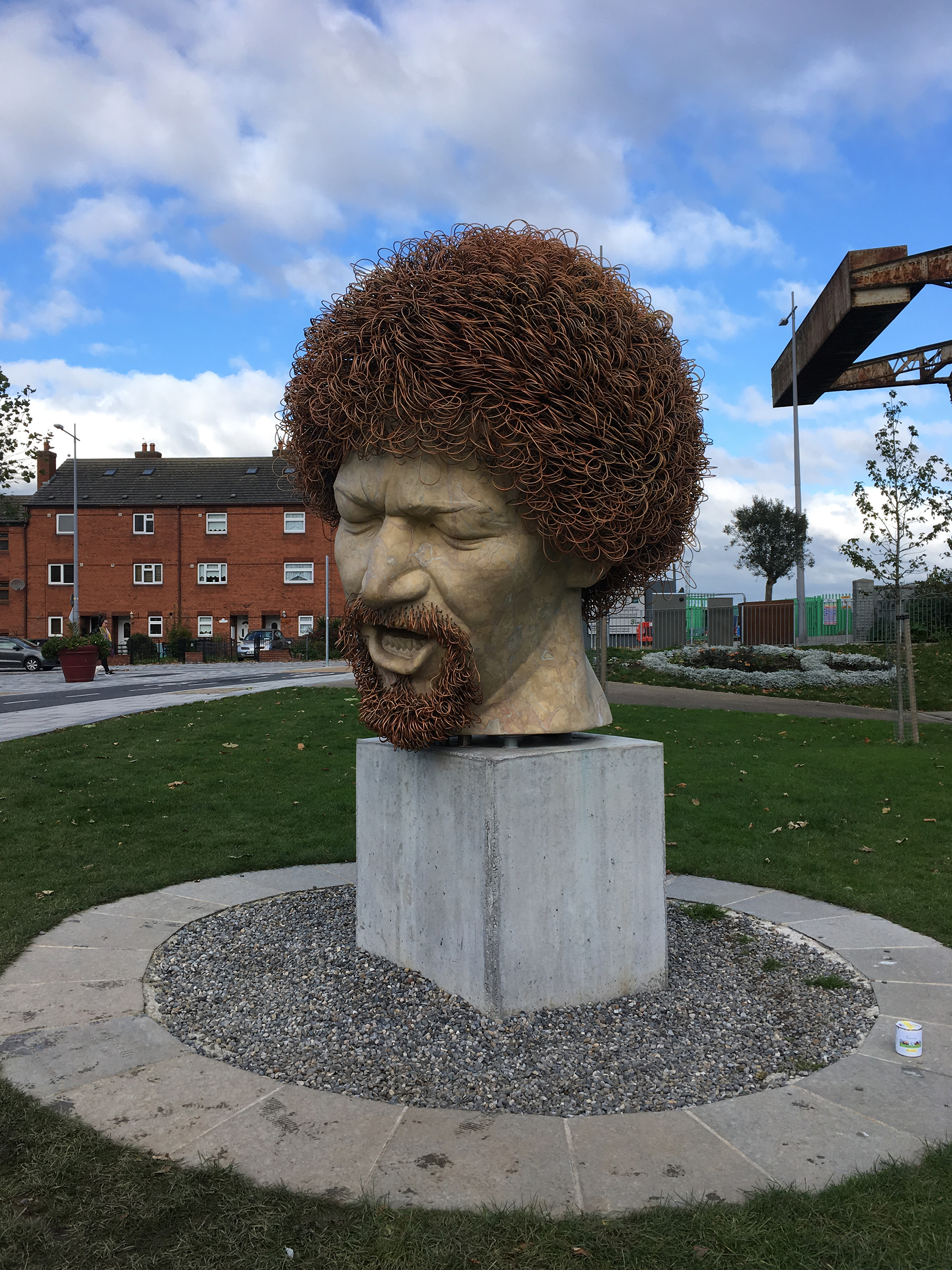
The Statue of Luke Kelly which Burke campaigned for

During his term, Burke attracted media attention for suggesting that members of the British royal family should not be invited to the State's 1916 centenary commemorations. He described himself as a "home alone" mayor, noting that he was divorced, had not remarried, and did not intend to live full-time in the Mansion House. He continued during his mayoralty to campaign for a long-planned statue of the singer Luke Kelly and for the establishment of residential drug-treatment units, saying Dublin's drug problem had become worse than it had been in the 1980s.

=== Homelessness and community work ===
Burke has been involved for many years in efforts to address homelessness in Dublin's north inner city. He has taken part in regular overnight outreach and soup runs with the charity Inner City Helping Homeless (ICHH), whose director, Anthony Flynn, credited Burke with supporting the organisation before it had a permanent office and with helping raise the profile of homelessness in the city. Burke has also provided addiction support classes to inmates at Mountjoy and Arbour Hill prisons.

Following the resignation of ICHH chairman David Hall in August 2021, amid controversy and reported threats to Hall's safety after separate allegations concerning the charity's founder and former chief executive, Anthony Flynn, Burke was appointed interim chairman of the charity's board. Flynn, who was also an independent Dublin city councillor, had died earlier that month while under Garda investigation over alleged sexual assaults. At Flynn's funeral, Burke, a fellow councillor, described him as having "a heart of pure gold".

== Personal life ==
Burke married at the age of 17; the marriage ended in separation, and he has not remarried. He is a recovering alcoholic and has said he stopped drinking following treatment in 1979. He has five children, and has said one of his daughters shares his interest in politics and community work.

Burke is also known locally for his singing. He won a Joe Dolan impersonation competition in Mullingar against a field of other entrants, and a CD he subsequently recorded raised several thousand euro for charity. He has continued to use his singing to raise funds for children requiring cancer treatment abroad.

Civic offices
Preceded by Oisín Quinn	Lord Mayor of Dublin; 2014–2015	Succeeded by Críona Ní Dhálaigh
