= Statue of Luke Kelly, Dublin =

Statue of Luke Kelly in Dublin, Ireland

Statue of Luke Kelly
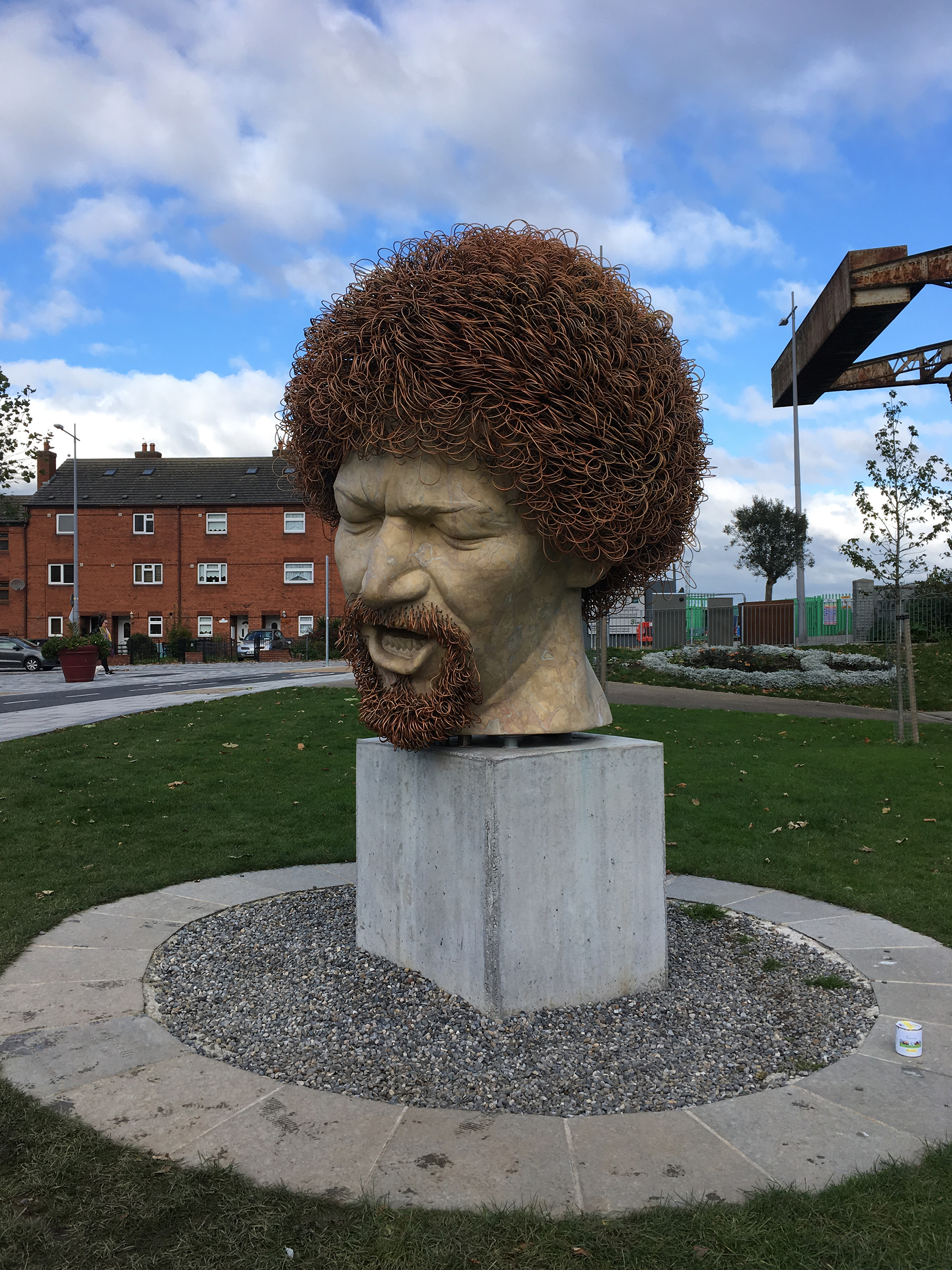

- Location within Central Dublin
- Artist: Vera Klute
- Year: 2019
- Medium: Sculpture
- Movement: Realism
- Subject: Luke Kelly singing Scorn Not His Simplicity
- Dimensions: 250 cm × 170 cm × 170 cm (98 in × 67 in × 67 in)
- Location: Dublin, Ireland; 53°21′01″N 6°14′26″W
- Owner: Dublin City Council

The Statue of Luke Kelly is a large marble sculpted head of Irish folk singer Luke Kelly, with metal wire for hair. The statue is located at the north end of Luke Kelly Park (formerly Linear Park), near the junction of Sheriff Street Upper and Guild Street, Dublin 1.

== Artist ==
Multi-disciplinary artist Vera Klute was awarded the commission for this sculpture after a closed competition run by Dublin City Council. While the artist is well known for portraiture in both painting and sculpture, her practice also involves kinetic work, video animation or ceramics.

Other sculpture busts by the artist include a bust of Garry Hynes at the National Gallery of Ireland and a bust of Eileen Gray at villa E-1027 and the Irish Embassy, Paris. Most recently Klute's bust of Rosalind Franklin was unveiled at the Library at Trinity College Dublin.

== History ==
The statue was unveiled along with another statue of Luke Kelly on South King Street on 30 January 2019 by President Michael D. Higgins.

It was unveiled to mark the 35th anniversary of the death of Kelly on 30 January 1984, after calls to memorialise the singer in his hometown and specifically near where Luke Kelly grew-up on Sheriff Street.

=== Vandalism ===
The statue has been vandalised numerous times since it was commissioned. In July 2020, the 7th incident of defacement resulted in a 40-year-old man being charged with vandalism. These repeat incidents have raised questions regarding the statue's location and accessibility, which have included suggestions to relocate it to a more public area.

== Production ==
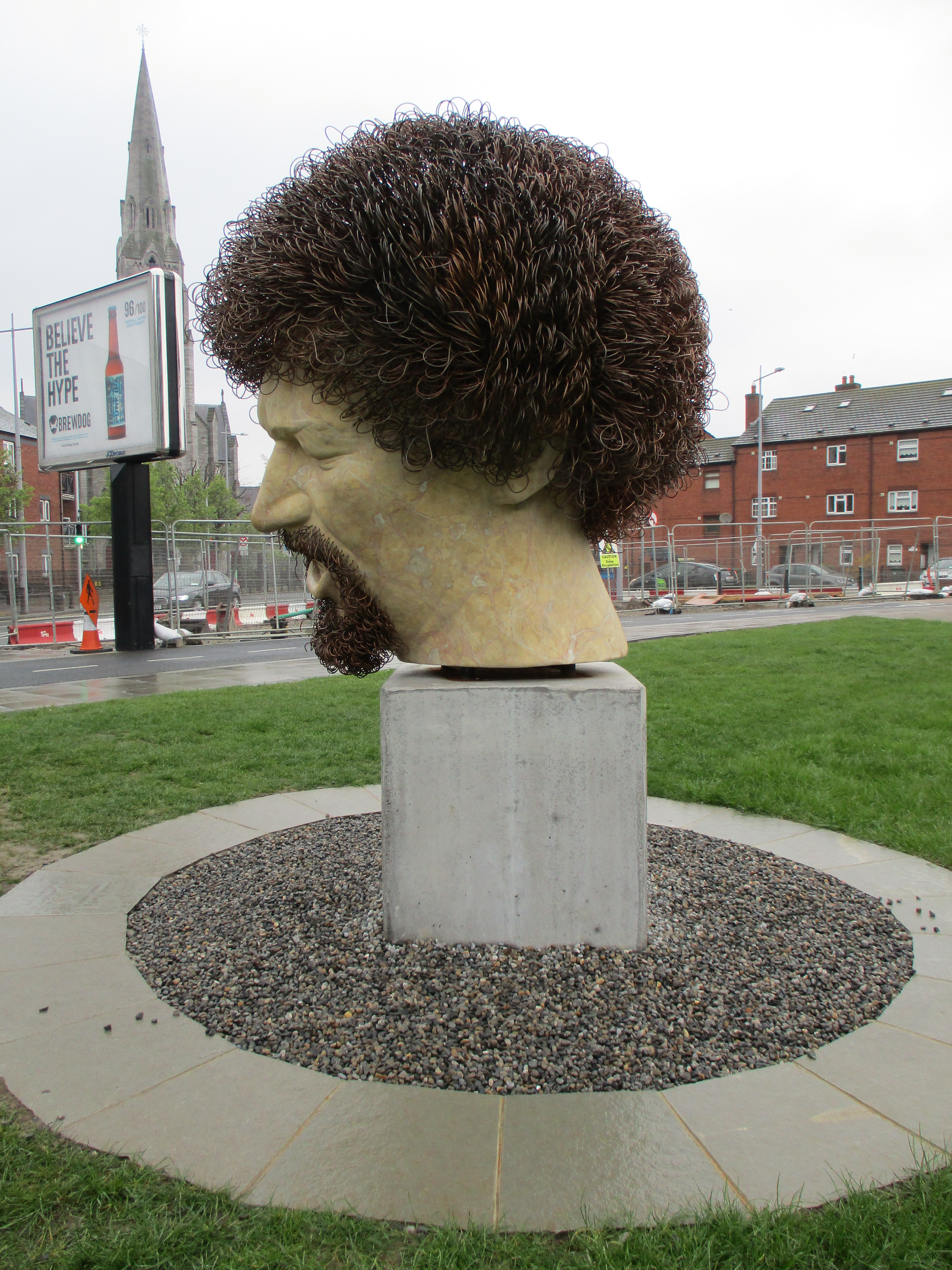
Side view of the statue

The statue is circa 250 cm x 170 cm x 170 cm excluding the stone base. The head is made from Libyan marble, while treated metal wire was used to form the hair and beard. The individually curled hairs are attached to larger perforated metal sheets that form a 'cap'. The moustache is made of individual pieces of wire which were drilled into the face of the statue.

The artist first made an initial model with wire hair in smaller near life sized form. Then she sculpted a second larger model from polystyrene and wax but without hair at about half the size of the finished sculpture. This second statue was then used for 3D scanning to create the final larger sized version cut from marble via a 5-axis cnc milling machine in Italy. The sculpture was then hand finished in Ireland.

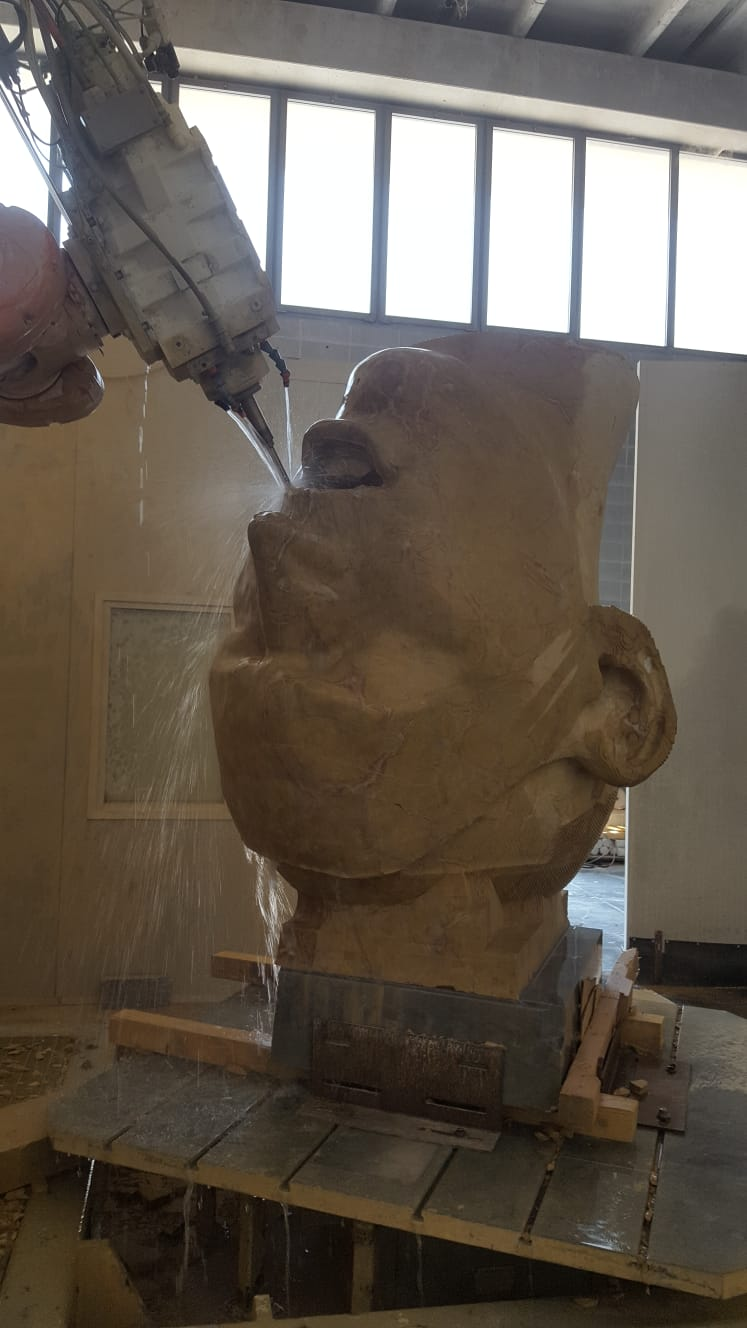
Production shot of Luke Kelly Sculpture

The appearance is based on a distinctive pose of Luke Kelly with his eyes closed while performing and is said to be taken from a still from his performance of Scorn Not His Simplicity on a show hosted by Jim McCann in 1974 called 'McCann Man'.

== See also ==
- List of public art in Dublin
- The Dubliners
