= James Donovan (forensic scientist) =

Irish forensic police officer (1944–2025)

James Donovan (1944 – 18 February 2025) was an Irish police officer who was a senior forensic scientist to the Garda Technical Bureau of the Garda Síochána (the Republic of Ireland's police), until his retirement in 2002. He was a key witness in the Provisional Irish Republican Army assassination of Lord Louis Mountbatten, and was the target himself of Irish criminal Martin Cahill.

== Life and career ==
Donovan was from County Cork. After gaining science degrees in Ireland and training in Ireland, London, and the United States, he joined the civilian science service of the Garda Síochána.

=== Assassination of Lord Mountbatten ===
Louis Mountbatten, 1st Earl Mountbatten of Burma usually holidayed at his summer home, Classiebawn Castle, in Mullaghmore, a small seaside village located on the coast of County Sligo in the west of Ireland. The village was only 12 miles (19 km) from County Fermanagh in Northern Ireland, and near an area known to be used as a cross-border safe-haven by IRA members.

Despite security advice and warnings from the Gardaí, on 27 August 1979, Lord Mountbatten went lobster-potting and tuna-fishing in the 30 feet (9.1 m) wooden boat, the Shadow V, which had been moored in the harbour at Mullaghmore. IRA member Thomas McMahon had slipped onto the unguarded boat that night and attached a radio-controlled fifty-pound (23 kg) bomb. When Mountbatten was aboard en route to Donegal Bay, the bomb was detonated just a few hundred yards from the shore. It is not known who activated the radio-controlled bomb as McMahon had been arrested earlier at a Garda checkpoint between Longford and Granard.

The boat was blown to pieces by the force of the blast. Mountbatten, then aged 79, was fatally wounded. He was pulled alive from the water by nearby fishermen, but died from his injuries before being brought to the shore.

Others killed by the blast were Nicholas Knatchbull, his elder daughter's 14-year-old son, and Paul Maxwell, a 15-year-old from Enniskillen in County Fermanagh, who was a crew member. The Dowager Lady Brabourne, his elder daughter's 83-year-old mother-in-law, was seriously injured in the explosion and died from her injuries the following day.

McMahon was arrested by the Gardaí two hours before the bomb detonated, having been initially stopped on suspicion of driving a stolen vehicle. He was tried for the murders in the Republic of Ireland, and convicted by forensic evidence supplied by Donovan that showed flecks of paint from the boat and traces of nitroglycerine on his clothes. McMahon was sentenced to life imprisonment for murder on 23 November 1979, but was released in 1998 under the terms of the Good Friday Agreement.

=== Assassination attempt by Martin Cahill ===
In January 1982, fearing the increasing role that forensic science could play in detecting his robberies, Martin Cahill had a bomb placed under Donovan's car bonnet at his home in Belgard, Dublin. Having suffered very serious but not life-threatening injuries, he was taken by ambulance to St. James's Hospital, Dublin.

Suspicion of the plot immediately fell on both the IRA and the INLA, members of which Donovan was due to give evidence against in the following weeks. However, evidence quickly pointed to an association with Cahill. At the time, Cahill and an associate named Christy Dutton were facing charges related to an armed robbery in January 1981. Donovan was testifying against Cahill and Dutton in the trial. Both Cahill and Dutton were acquitted on a technicality in June 1984. The main prosecution witness in the case, admitted under cross-examination that she had not been in fear for her life during the robbery, a point on which conviction for armed robbery hinged. Nobody was ever convicted for the failed assassination attempt on Donovan's life. In December 1987, on the orders of newly appointed commissioner Eamonn Doherty, the Gardaí set up a Special Surveillance Unit (SSU), called the Tango Squad, to specifically target and monitor Cahill's gang on a permanent, 24/7 basis. Cahill was given the callsign Tango-1.

In February 1988, a Today Tonight report identified Cahill as the man behind the Donovan bomb plot, the Beit robbery, and the robbery of O'Connors jewellery depot. As a result, PD leader Desmond O'Malley raised the revelations that Cahill owned such expensive property in Cowper Downs, despite having never worked, sarcastically remarking that Cahill must have needed the extra wall space to hang his artwork by the Dutch masters.

In 1994, released on bail after the failed Lacey kidnapping, Cahill was assassinated by the IRA.

=== Later life and death ===
Though he suffered lifelong pain after the bombing, Donovan continued to work until his retirement in 2002. He died on 18 February 2025, at the age of 80.
