= Phyllis Clinch =

Irish botanist

Phyllis E. M. Clinch
- Born: 12 September 1901; Dublin, Ireland
- Died: 19 October 1984 (aged 83); Tenerife, Canary Islands
- Known for: Plant viruses

Phyllis E. M. Clinch (12 September 1901 – 19 October 1984) was an Irish botanist most recognised for her work in the field of plant viruses.

Clinch attained her undergraduate degree from University College Dublin in 1923, achieving first place in the course with a first class honours in botany and chemistry. She was then awarded a scholarship and continued to study under Joseph Doyle at University College Dublin obtaining a master's in 1924. She went on to study a PhD in plant physiology, specializing in the biochemistry of Coniferales. She worked with Alexandre Guilliermond in the Sorbonne on cytology (1928-9). In 1929 she became a research assistant for the investigation of plant virus diseases, department of plant pathology, University College, Dublin. In 1942, she served as an elected member of the Royal Dublin Society scientific council, and later she served as part of the council and then vice president. She retired in 1971.

== Early life ==
Phyllis Clinch was born on 12 September 1901 in Rathgar, Dublin, to James and Mary Clinch. She was their fourth daughter. She grew up in Rathmines, Dublin with her family.

=== Education ===
As a child she attended the Loreto school. It was here that her interest in science was cultivated: "This progressive school taught science to girls in the early 1900s and Phyllis, liking the nun who taught chemistry, chose chemistry over history in her later years in school". She continued her studies at the University College Dublin (UCD) where she studied from 1919 to 1923 and graduated with first-class honors degrees in chemistry and botany. She was at the top of her class, and she received a post-grad scholarship. In 1924 she received her MSc degree through her thesis work in addition to being awarded a research fellowship from the Dublin City Council in 1925. Then, in 1928 she got her PhD by studying the metabolism of conifer leaves. She did the work for her PhD at the Imperial College in London while studying under V. H. Blackman. Throughout the completion of her research (from 1926 to 1928) she published five papers with Joseph Doyle, her supervisor. She then worked with Alexandre Guilliermond studying cytology (the function and structure of cells) from 1928 to 1929 at the Sorbonne in Paris.

== Career ==
In 1929 she became a research assistant for the UCD department of plant pathology. Starting in 1929 she also joined a group at Albert Agricultural College doing research on plant viruses. She published this research, with her colleagues J. B. Loughnane and Paul A. Murphy, in Scientific Proceedings for the Royal Dublin Society, a scientific journal. They published a series of nine papers from 1932 to 1949. Clinch was also published in Nature, an internationally known scientific journal, and Éire, a journal from the Department of Agriculture in Ireland. Then in 1949 she was made a lecturer for the botany department at UCD, and in 1961 she took over for Joseph Doyle as a professor in the department. This made her the first woman professor of botany at the university. The appointment of a woman to professorship was so unusual at the time, that the national broadsheet, the Irish Times, dedicated an article to the subject, titles "Professorship for Women". Clinch had worked with Doyle to plan the move of the college's botany department to the new campus, and she oversaw the move of the department in 1964. She retired from UCD in 1971. Her teaching and leadership were important factors in the department's rapid expansion and its research output during her time. This leadership role is especially notable in the Irish context, as Irish society was at its most conservative and the role of women outside of the home was severely limited.

In 1942 was elected to be a member of the scientific committee of RDS (Royal Dublin Society). She served on the council from 1973 to 1977, and she was the vice-president from 1975 to 1977. In 1949 she was one of the first women to be elected to the RIA (the Royal Irish Academy). Three other women were elected at the same time as her. She was elected to the RIA council in 1973, where she served from 1973 to 1977, and she served as vice-president from 1975 to 1977.

=== Awards and recognition ===
In 1943, Clinch was awarded an honorary Doctorate of Science (D.Sc.), based on the strength of her published scientific work.

On 30 March 1961 she became the first woman to receive the Boyle Medal from the RDS (Royal Dublin Society). The next woman to receive the award was Margaret Murnane, a physicist, who was awarded 50 years later. Clinch received the award in recognition of her publications and scientific work.

In 2016 portraits of the first four women elected to the RIA, including Phyllis Clinch, were hung at the RIA's Academy House. This is the first time that women's portraits had been hung at the Academy House since the RIA was founded 230 years earlier. The portraits were created by Vera Klute, and relatives of the women were present as the portraits were unveiled. The portraits were a result of the Women on the Walls campaign, created by Accenture, which works to promote the careers of women in STEM.

=== Notable work ===
In the 1930s Clinch gained international fame for the work that she did to reveal complex viruses in potatoes. She identified symptomless viruses and viruses that damaged potato stocks. Her findings about viruses were then used by the Department of Agriculture to develop potatoes free of diseases for farmers which was beneficial to the Irish potato industry. She later focused on pathogens in sugar beets in addition to identifying six viruses in tomatoes. The Department of Agriculture asked her to identify the agents of disease in tomatoes and sugar beets so that recommendations could be made on how to control the agents.

== Miscellanea ==
According to nephew Paul Clinch, in a brief biosketch by consulting company Accenture, generations of students referred to Clinch by the respectful nickname "Auntie Phyll".
