= Larry Dunne =

Irish organised crime boss and drug dealer

Laurence Dunne (February 1948 - 18 May 2020) was an Irish organised crime boss and drug dealer. He was held responsible for introducing heroin into Dublin in the 1970s.

== Early life ==
Laurence Dunne was born in February 1948 into a large inner-city Dublin family of 14 children, growing up in Dolphin's Barn. The son of Christy "Bronco" Dunne Snr. and his wife Ellen, his father ran a stall in the Iveagh Markets in the Liberties and had served eighteen months in Portlaoise Prison for manslaughter in 1939. At the age of 12 in 1960, Dunne and his eight-year old brother Henry ran away from home and went to London to look for their father, before being reunited and escorted back to Dublin.

Dunne became involved in petty crime at a young age. Aside from drug dealing, he had been previously charged with breaking and entering, robbery, armed robbery and driving without insurance. Like many of his brothers, he spent time in reformatories; firstly in St Joseph's in Letterfrack and then Daingean Reformatory.

== Criminal career ==
Dunne moved to England as a teenager, where he received 18 convictions for petty crime. After returning to Dublin in his 20s, he began to get involved in armed robberies alongside his brothers, and was once shot in the arm in a botched attempt at a robbery.

He began supplying heroin in Dublin in the late 1970s, using a network of connections with British drug dealers he had developed while in England. He organised young "runners" to supply heroin on streets and in flat complexes; because of this he earned the nickname "Larry doesn't carry".

Dunne made enough money that in May 1982 he, his wife Lily and three children moved to a luxury home in Sandyford at the foot of the Dublin Mountains. Although unemployed he paid £100,000 for it – the equivalent of €1.3 million in 2020 prices.

In June 1983 he was brought before the courts on drugs trafficking charges, after a large quantity of heroin, cocaine and cannabis was found at his Rathfarnham home. After a morning testimony against him he absconded. He was found guilty in his absence. While on the run he hid in Crumlin, a house of friends in County Leitrim, spent a few days in a Divine Light Mission commune, then went to the Costa del Sol followed by Portugal.

He was arrested in Portugal, extradited to Ireland and served 10 years of a 14 year sentence.

He was convicted in 2004 of dealing for an offence that occurred in 1999.

At the time of his death had more than 40 criminal convictions.

== Death ==
Dunne was diagnosed with lung cancer in early 2019. He died in St. James's Hospital on 18 May 2020 after slitting his own throat the day before. An inquest at Dublin District Coroner's Court heard that a passerby had noticed Dunne, who told her to "fuck off" and brandished a knife when she offered to seek help. At the time of his death, Dunne also had double pneumonia and severe coronary heart disease.

== See also ==
- Christy Kinahan
- John Gilligan
- Martin "Marlo" Hyland
