= Martin Cahill =

Irish mob boss (1949–1994)

- Cahill in the mid-1980s
- Born: 23 May 1949; Dublin, County Dublin, Ireland
- Died: 18 August 1994 (aged 45); Ranelagh, Dublin, County Dublin, Ireland
- Cause of death: Assassination by the Provisional IRA
- Other name: The General
- Spouse: Frances Lawless
- Children: 10
- Conviction: Armed robbery

Martin Cahill (23 May 1949 – 18 August 1994) was an Irish crime boss from Dublin. Known as "The General", Cahill masterminded a series of burglaries and armed robberies in Ireland throughout the 1980s and 1990s. He was shot and killed in 1994 while out on bail for kidnapping charges. The Provisional Irish Republican Army took responsibility for Cahill's murder but no one was ever arrested or formally charged.

== Early life ==
He was born in a slum district just off Mountjoy Square on Grenville Street in Dublin's north inner city, the second of twelve surviving children of Patrick Cahill, a lighthouse-keeper, and Agnes Sheehan. By the time he was in school, Martin and his older brother John were stealing food to supplement the family's income. In 1960, the family was moved to Captain's Road, Crumlin, as part of the Dublin slum clearances. Martin was sent to a Christian Brothers School (CBS) on the same road where he lived but was soon playing truant and committing frequent burglaries with his brothers. At 15, he attempted to join the Royal Navy, but was rejected, allegedly after offering to break into houses for them and because he had a criminal record.

== Career ==
At age 16, he was convicted of two burglaries and sentenced to an industrial school run by the Oblates of Mary Immaculate at Daingean, County Offaly. After his release, he met and married Frances Lawless, a girl from Rathmines, where his family was living.

With his brothers, he continued to commit multiple burglaries in the affluent neighbourhoods nearby, at one point even robbing the Garda Síochána depot for confiscated firearms. The Cahill brothers soon turned to armed robbery, and by the early 1970s Gardaí at the Dublin Central Detective Unit (CDU) had identified the Cahill brothers as major criminals, when they teamed up with the notorious Dunne gang in Crumlin to rob security vans conveying cash from banks.

=== Rise to prominence ===
In 1978, Dublin Corporation began preparing to demolish Hollyfield Buildings. Cahill, then serving a four-year suspended prison sentence, fought through the courts to prevent his neighbourhood's destruction. Even after the tenements were demolished, he continued to live in a pitched tent on the site. Finally, Lord Mayor of Dublin Ben Briscoe paid a visit to Cahill's tent and persuaded him to move into a new house in a more upscale district of Rathmines.

Cahill and his gang stole gold and diamonds with a value of over IR£2 million (€2.55 million; €6.35 million in 2021, adjusted for inflation) from O'Connor's jewellers in Harolds Cross (1983); the jeweller was subsequently forced to close, with the loss of more than one hundred jobs. He was also involved in stealing some of the world's most valuable paintings from Russborough House (1986) and extorting restaurants and hot dog vendors in Dublin's nightclub district.

=== Tango Squad ===
Fearing the increasing role that forensic science could play in detecting his robberies, in May 1982 Cahill had a bomb placed under the car of chief forensic scientist, James O'Donovan, partly disabling him.

In February 1988, a Today Tonight report identified Cahill as the man behind the O'Donovan bomb plot, the 1986 Russborough House robbery and the robbery of O'Connor's jewellery depot. As a result, PD leader Dessie O'Malley raised in the Dáil the revelations that Cahill owned such expensive property in Cowper Downs, despite having never worked, remarking that Cahill must have needed the extra wall space to "hang his artwork by the Dutch masters."

As a result, the Gardaí set up a Special Surveillance Unit (SSU), nicknamed "Tango Squad", to specifically target and monitor Cahill's gang on a permanent, 24/7 basis. Cahill was given the callsign Tango-1. The SSU also placed a direct presence on the estate at Cowper Downs, positioning a surveillance unit in the home of developer John Sisk, whose house backed onto Cahill's. Following the arrest of two of Cahill's associates in an attempted robbery, and resentful of the large Garda presence near his home, Cahill retaliated by ordering his men to slash the tyres of 197 cars on the night of 26 February 1988 (including 90 belonging to his neighbours in Cowper Downs). Cahill returned home to find his own Mercedes-Benz smashed.

In order to write about Cahill without facing charges for libel, the media referred to Cahill by the sobriquet "The General". Cahill took particular care to hide his face from the media — he would spread the fingers of one hand and cover his face.

=== Lacey kidnapping ===
In early 1993, John "The Coach" Traynor, met his boss Cahill, to provide him with inside information about the inner workings of the National Irish Bank (NIB) head office and branch at College Green, Dublin. Traynor told Cahill that the bank regularly held more than IR£10 million in cash in the building. The plan was to abduct NIB CEO Jim Lacey, his wife and four children and take them to an isolated hiding place. There, they would be held with fellow gang member Jo Jo Kavanagh, acting as a "hostage", who would frighten Lacey into handing over every penny stored in the bank's vaults.

On 1 November 1993, Cahill's gang seized Lacey and his wife outside his home in Blackrock. Whilst they were held at Lacey's home, Kavanagh was brought in and tied up, telling the family that he had been abducted two weeks before. On 2 November, Kavanagh drove Lacey to College Green to collect the ransom money, with Lacey eventually withdrawing IR£300,000 from an accessible cash machine. After the cash had been handed over to the gang, Kavanagh told Gardaí that the pair had been kidnapped and forced to take part in a robbery.

With a ransom note requesting payment of IR£10 million in cash, the Gardaí began investigating. They quickly found that Kavanagh had claimed child allowance during his two-week "capture", and so arrested him. Cahill then planned with Kavanagh to "raid" Kavanagh's home, and show intent to kill the Lacey family by shooting Kavanagh in the leg. Kavanagh was then to call the Irish newspapers from his hospital bed and claim he was a victim of the Lacey kidnapping gang.

However, the plan failed, and the gang were arrested.

== Assassination ==
With all gang members from the Lacey kidnapping released on bail, on 18 August 1994, Cahill left the house at which he had been staying at Swan Grove and began driving to a local shop. Upon reaching a road junction (where Oxford Road meets Charleston Road) he was repeatedly shot in the face and upper torso and died almost instantly. The gunman, who was armed with a .357 Magnum revolver, jumped on a motorbike, and disappeared from the scene.

There are a number of theories about who killed Martin Cahill and why.

Within hours of Cahill's death, the Provisional Irish Republican Army (IRA) claimed responsibility in a press release. The reasons cited were Cahill's alleged involvement with a Portadown unit of the Ulster Volunteer Force (UVF). The UVF unit in question had recently attempted a bomb attack on a south Dublin Irish pub which was hosting a Sinn Féin fund-raiser on 21 May 1994. The UVF operatives had been prevented from entering by pub doorman and Volunteer in the Provisional IRA's Dublin Brigade Martin Doherty, who they instead shot dead. The IRA further alleged that Cahill had been involved in selling the stolen Vermeer paintings from Russborough House to the UVF Mid-Ulster Brigade led by Billy Wright, alias "King Rat". The Mid-Ulster Brigade then fenced the paintings for money, which they used to fund arms trafficking from South Africa under apartheid. This act allegedly sealed Cahill's fate and put him at the top of an IRA hit list. In a later statement, the IRA said that it was Cahill's "involvement with and assistance to pro-British death squads which forced us to act".

Another theory surfaced after the publication of Paul Williams' The General, which claims to have insights from Garda cold case investigators who were still looking into Cahill's murder. Reputedly, two of Cahill's underlings, John Gilligan and John Traynor, had put together a massive hashish trafficking ring while paying protection money to the IRA and INLA. When Cahill allegedly tried to also extort protection money from them, the Gardaí believe that Traynor and Gilligan approached the IRA and accused Cahill of importing heroin, a drug that the IRA despised and were trying to prevent from being sold in Dublin. Reputedly this, and Cahill's past dealings with the Ulster loyalists, gave the Provisional IRA reason to order his assassination. A further incentive was provided by Gilligan and Traynor, from whom the Provisionals allegedly demanded and received a considerable sum in exchange for Cahill's assassination.

Even though Frances Cahill's memoir, Martin Cahill, My Father, alleges the General detested and steered clear of drug trafficking, his brother Peter was imprisoned for heroin trafficking.

After a Roman Catholic requiem mass, Martin Cahill was buried in consecrated ground at Mount Jerome Cemetery. In 2001, his gravestone was vandalised and broken in two.

== CAB asset seizure ==
Following the 1996 murder of journalist Veronica Guerin, the Oireachtas set up the Criminal Assets Bureau, to seize assets of those who were both convicted of crimes and also seemingly had no obvious means of income. The CAB was set up to focus mainly on high-profile drug dealers but had an open approach to all convicted criminals. Cahill denied that he was ever involved in drug dealing; however, his brother Peter was convicted of supplying heroin in the 1980s.

In 1984, Cahill had bought his growing family a house on the Cowper Downs development, on the southside of Dublin, paying IR£80,000 cash despite having no paid formal employment since he left his first and only job in 1969. On 1 May 2005, under an agreement with his widow Frances, the CAB seized and subsequently sold the property.

== Personal life ==
Cahill was a diabetic. Cahill was married to Frances Lawless with whom he fathered five children. Cahill also had, a mistress in his wife's younger sister Tina Lawless, with whom Cahill fathered a further four children. He had a child with a third sister. This polygamous arrangement was depicted in the 1998 biopic of Cahill's life, The General.

== In popular culture ==
In 1998 John Boorman (who had lived in Ireland for nearly 20 years) directed a biographical film titled The General, starring Brendan Gleeson as Cahill. The film won the Best Director award at the Cannes Film Festival. It was based on a book by Irish crime journalist Paul Williams, who was also the crime editor of the Irish tabloid the Sunday World. Boorman himself once had his home burgled by Cahill, who stole the gold record which Boorman had won for the Deliverance soundtrack. This incident is depicted in the film.

Ken Stott starred as Cahill in a 1999 BBC drama, Vicious Circle written by Kieran Prendiville

The 2003 film Veronica Guerin implies that John Gilligan ordered Cahill's murder. In the film Gilligan and Traynor are not portrayed as Cahill's subordinates. Instead, Gilligan appears as a rival mob boss and Traynor as a lower-level associate.

The film Ordinary Decent Criminal, starring Kevin Spacey, is loosely based on Cahill's life.

In 2004, a book written by Matthew Hart was released entitled The Irish Game: A True Story of Crime and Art, which depicted the story of the Russborough House heist in 1986 and Cahill's involvement.

Cahill's eldest daughter, Frances Cahill, released a book in 2008 entitled Martin Cahill, My Father.

== Quotes ==
- "Reform school was my primary school, St. Patrick's Institution my secondary school, and Mountjoy my university—they taught me everything I know."
- "Whatever it is you say I am, I am not. Whatever it is you want from me, I will give. Whatever it is you take from me, you can take. What is it you can do to me? The worst thing you can do is kill me, after that I won't care, I am still free."

== See also ==
- List of unsolved murders (1980–1999)
