= Concerned Criminals Action Committee =

The Concerned Criminals Action Committee (CCAC) was a group formed by members of the Martin Cahill criminal gang in Dublin in the 1980s, as a foil to the Concerned Parents Against Drugs (CPAD) group. CPAD formed in February 1984, to address drug activity in the community through citizen patrols and checkpoints. Members of the CCAC stated that they were not organising in support of the drug trade, but rather because of concerns that CPAD was reporting other criminal activities to the Garda as well, and interfering with non-drug criminal activities.

CPAD and CCAC held several meetings to discuss a peaceful resolution, but CPAD had been infiltrated by Irish Republican Army-linked persons interested in taking down the Cahill gang, and a period of violence and kidnappings ensued.
