= Borderline (2024 TV series) =

British/Irish television series

- Written by: John Forte
- Directed by: Robert Quinn
- Starring: Eoin Macken; Amy De Bhrún
- Countries of origin: United Kingdom; Ireland
- Original language: English
- No. of series: 1
- No. of episodes: 6

Production
- Executive producers: Steve November; Mary Callery
- Production companies: ShinAwil; Further South Productions

Original release
- Network: MGM+
- Release: 2 September 2024

Borderline is an Irish and Northern Irish police procedural television series set on the border between Ireland and Northern Ireland, where crimes affect both sides of the border. The cast is led by Eoin Macken and Amy De Bhrún and also includes Lochlann O'Mearain and Hugh O'Conor as well as Charlotte Bradley, Sophie Vavasseur, Craig McGinlay, and Jack Hickey. It was broadcast in September 2024.

== Premise ==
Members of Northern Ireland's Police Service and the Republic of Ireland's Garda Síochána, including Detective Chief Inspector Philip Boyd of Northern Ireland and his Republic of Ireland counterpart, Detective Inspector Aoife Regan, must put their differences aside and collaborate to solve a crime that appears to straddle the border between the two territories.

== Cast ==
- Eoin Macken as DCI Philip Boyd
- Amy De Bhrún as DI Aoife Regan
- Lochlann O'Mearain as Jack Mullen
- Hugh O'Conor as CS James Casey
- Charlotte Bradley as CS Flynn
- Sophie Vavasseur as Aisling
- Craig McGinlay as Rev Adam
- Charlie Maher as Joe Dooley
- Ciaran McMahon as Captain
- Amy Molloy as Lottie Mullen
- Paul Reid as DC Maguire
- Siobhan O'Kelly as Roise Boyd
- Barry John Kinsella as Ian Walsh
- Sarah Carroll as Roisin
- Jack Hickey as Sean
- Adam Walker-Kavanagh as Garda Brady

== Production ==
The series is written by John Forte whilst Robert Quinn directs and Steve November and Mary Callery are executive producers.

It is produced by Irish production company ShinAwil and UK-based firm Further South Productions. Funding comes from German channel ZDF. Backing also comes from Screen Ireland and distribution is by Lionsgate. The cast is led by Eoin Macken and Amy De Bhrún. The cast also includes Lochlann O'Mearain and Hugh O'Connor as well as Charlotte Bradley, Sophie Vavasseur, Craig McGinlay, and Jack Hickey.

Filming took place in County Louth in the Republic of Ireland, with filming locations including Dundalk, in 2023.

== Broadcast ==
The series premiered in the United States on Roku on 1 September 2024. It premiered in the United Kingdom on MGM+ from 2 September 2024 and was later broadcast on ITV1 from 3 October 2025.
