= Dead Cat Bounce =

Former Irish comedy band

- Origin: Dublin, Ireland
- Genre: Comedy
- Years active: 2008–2013
- Past members: Demian Fox; Shane O'Brien; James Walmsley; Mick Cullinan
- Website: Official Site

Dead Cat Bounce was an Irish comedy troupe made up of Demian Fox (drums), Shane O'Brien (bass) and James Walmsley (guitar and lead vocals). Based in Dublin, the group performed original comedy songs in various musical styles. They wrote and starred in the mockumentary Discoverdale (2012), and wrote Apocalypse Clown (2023).

== History ==
They met at Trinity College Dublin in 2002 where they were all founding members of the sketch comedy group H-BAM which also included Aisling Bea. In late 2007 Fox, O'Brien and Walmsley were living together in Dublin and began to write a sketch show which they performed in the Project Arts Centre in January 2008. They chose the name Dead Cat Bounce (a stockbroking term) because the show opened with three stockbrokers standing over the body of a dead hooker. Will Ferrell happened to be in the audience at this very first show.

In April 2008 the group premiered a second show Dead Cat Bounce...Radio Play in Dublin’s Sugar Club. This was in the style of a 1950s radio recording and Mick Cullinan, who had directed the first show, was brought in to play keyboards and do live sound effects. This was also the first time the four played together as a band. In August 2008, they took both shows to the Edinburgh Festival Fringe, performing them back to back every night for a month.

In October 2008, they recorded a pilot TV sketch show for RTÉ which was part of Project Ha Ha – a season of comedy pilots aired on RTÉ Two in January 2009.

In March 2009, they were invited to perform at the Just For Laughs Festival in Montreal, appearing in a televised gala hosted by Martin Short.

In January 2010 they made a series of clips for BBC Online entitled 'The Maida Vale Incident'. These were shot at Maida Vale Studios in London and featured the songs 'Midget', 'Overenthusiastic Contraceptive Lady' and 'Four Lads'. They also include a cameo from T4 presenter Miquita Oliver.

In 2010, Dead Cat Bounce toured Australia for the first time, performing at the Adelaide Fringe Festival, Melbourne International Comedy Festival and Sydney Comedy Festival where they were awarded the Time Out Jury Prize. The following year they won the People's Choice Award at the Sydney Comedy Festival.

In addition to comedy festivals, Dead Cat Bounce also performed at several major music festivals, including Electric Picnic, Oxegen, Leeds and Reading festivals.

The band made a number of music videos, most notably "Rugby" which was first aired on the RTÉ show Republic of Telly and became the fifth most viewed YouTube clip in Ireland in 2011. In 2010 the band also recorded a charity single for Movember entitled "Every Time You Shave a Moustache Dies".

== Touring shows ==
Dead Cat Bounce

First performed in January 2008 in the Project Arts Centre, Dublin, and brought to the Edinburgh Festival 2008, this self-titled show was made up of a series of twelve sketches set in the same hotel room. It included Famine the Musical! A seven-minute ‘musical’ based on the Great Famine of Ireland.

Dead Cat Bounce...Radio Play

First performed in April 2008 in the Sugar Club, Dublin and brought to the Edinburgh Festival 2008, this show was in the style of a 1950s radio recording and featured a live foley artist. It was also the first show in which Dead Cat Bounce played together as a band and included the songs ‘Golf!’ and ‘Damn Girl’ which would later feature in their RTÉ pilot.

Dead Cat Bounce...Wired

First performed in the Sugar Club, Dublin in April 2009, and brought to the Edinburgh Festival 2009, this was billed as a ‘rock and roll sketch show’ and combined songs with character sketches performed on mic. It included all seven songs featured on the live EP 'Dead Cat Bounce, live at the Sugar Club'.

Dead Cat Bounce...Too Fast For Love

Developed on tour in Australia and brought to the Edinburgh Fringe in 2010, the show was the first to see Dead Cat Bounce play characters in a dysfunctional rock band. It includes all three songs featured in The Kasabian Incident filmed for BBC Online.

Dead Cat Bounce...Caged Heat

First performed in Whelan's, Dublin on 10 February 2011, this show toured Australia, Ireland and the UK and was brought to the Edinburgh Festival 2011. The show included songs featured on the album 'Dead Cat Bounce, live at the Roisin Dubh'.

Dead Cat Bounce...Howl Of The She Leopard

First performed at the Soho Theatre, London in February 2012, this is the band's most recent touring show. It is the first Dead Cat Bounce show since the departure of Mick Cullinan on keyboards. Most songs from the show feature on the album 'Dead Cat Bounce, live at Vicar Street'.

== Albums ==
Dead Cat Bounce, live at the Sugar Club

In September 2009 Dead Cat Bounce performed six shows at the Sugar Club in Dublin for the Bulmers International Comedy Festival. Over the course of the run they recorded a live EP which contains the following songs:

1. Switzerland (4.07)
2. Overenthusiastic Contraceptive Lady (2.22):
3. Midget (2.48):
4. Rugby (2.26):
5. That Summer When we Killed that Guy (2.12):
6. In Da Club (2.50):
7. Four Lads (4.13)

Dead Cat Bounce, live at the Roisin Dubh

In February 2011 they recorded a second live album at the Roisin Dubh in Galway which includes the following songs:

1. Mary (4.54)
2. Christians In Love (3.49):
3. My Party Now (3.44):
4. Girl's Night (3.01):
5. Narcoleptic (1.15):
6. Cheeky Little Wine (2.39):
7. Outsized Orthopaedic Shoes (3.16):
8. Good Touch, Bad Touch (1.37):
9. Pigeons & Pirates (4.29):
10. Firemen (2.45):
11. Human Statue (3.33):
12. The Weeping Of The Willows (4.10):

Dead Cat Bounce, live at Vicar Street

On 24 February 2012 the band recorded a new live album at Vicar Street in Dublin, which was released on iTunes on 9 March 2012, songs include:

1. Border Control (4:06):
2. Christians in Love (4:09):
3. Older Woman (0:38):
4. Kayaking (4:21):
5. Leeroy the Homophobic Penguin (3:44):
6. Cheeky Little Wine (3:55):
7. Down On The Farm (2:14):
8. Outfits (2:38):
9. Golf! (1:54):
10. Really Tall Woman (3:20):
11. Comedy Drums & Bass (0:58):
12. Let's Make Love (To My Brand New Dead Cat Bounce CD) (3:32):
13. Cormac The Dancing Accountant (3:45):

== Singles ==
"Every Time You Shave a Moustache Dies"

In October 2010 the band released a charity single for Movember entitled Every Time You Shave a Moustache Dies.

"Rugby"

In February 2011 the band made a video for their song "Rugby" for the RTÉ show Republic of Telly. The song was released as a single on iTunes.

== Films ==
In November 2011, Dead Cat Bounce made their first feature film called Discoverdale which is shot as a fly-on-the-wall documentary which follows the band on their lead singer's quest to be reunited with his long-lost father, who he believes is rock legend David Coverdale from Whitesnake. It was directed by George Kane, produced by the Welded Tandem Picture Company and financed by 2 Entertain. It has gone on to win a number of film awards at film festivals including Best of the Fest at the L.A. Comedy Shorts Festival and Best International Feature at the Galway Film Fleadh. At 2:17 pm on 7 December 2011, Fox, O'Brien and Walmsley were made members of Whitesnake by David Coverdale for a full sixteen seconds, joining an illustrious alumni of over 60 rock musicians. They have also been commissioned to write a film script by the Irish Film Board.

The troupe wrote Apocalypse Clown (2023), a low-budget comedy film about unsuccessful clowns, accompanied by a journalist, during an electrical outage. Walmsley conceived it as a Clowns without Borders story in Africa, but it was filmed in Ireland. It won Best Irish Film at the Galway Film Fleadh and garnered acclaim for its cast. The humour and script polarised critics.

== Awards ==
Timeout Jury Prize at the Sydney Comedy Festival 2010

People's Choice Award at the Sydney Comedy Festival 2011

== Bootlegs ==
The band also regularly performed a late night covers set called Bootlegs. The two-hour show included over 140 different songs many of which are played as mashups. They played this set at numerous festivals including the Dublin Fringe, the Kilkenny Cat Laughs, the Melbourne International Comedy Festival, the Galway Comedy Festival and the Oxegen Festival. In 2011 Dead Cat Bounce were the house band for Late'n'Live in the Gilded Balloon and played 25 straight nights from 3 – 5 am at the Edinburgh Festival Fringe.

== Past members ==
In October 2011, through their Facebook page, the band announced that Mick Cullinan (keyboards) would no longer be performing with them.

== Final show and reunion ==
On 20 September 2013 Dead Cat Bounce performed their 'last ever' show 'Dead Cat Bounce...You're Welcome For The Music' in Vicar St, Dublin, with the full original line up including Cullinan. In December 2017 they returned to the Project Arts Centre for a week of reunion shows, 'Dead Cat Bounce...Do Stop Believing'.
