= Over da Rainbow =

- Directed by: Jay Lap
- Written by: Screenplay: Shawn Kittelsen; Story: Jay Lap; Shawn Kittelsen
- Produced by: Jay Lap
- Starring: Al Thompson; Joseph P. McDonnell; Tyler Hollinger; Stephen Hill; Jesse Teeters; Aldous Davidson; Jarrett Alexander; Christine Brumbaugh; Dan Abeles; Allan Fox
- Cinematography: Jonathan Chen
- Edited by: Jay Lap
- Release date: April 12, 2008
- Running time: 20 minutes
- Country: United States
- Language: English

Over da Rainbow is a 2008 American musical-comedy film (20 minutes), directed/produced/edited by Jay Lap, written by Shawn Kittelsen and starring Al Thompson, Joseph P. McDonnell, and Tyler Hollinger. Jay Lap assisted Shawn Kittelsen in developing the story, which was partially inspired by the former's bizarre encounter with a mid-50s musically-disinclined drug-addled divorcee. The film premiered on April 12, 2008 at the First Run Film Festival. Over da Rainbow went on to win four awards at the festival, including Achievements in Producing, Editing, Sound Design, and Production Design.

== Plot ==
Homophobic rap superstar Terrier (pronounced "teh-ree-AY") is tearing up the charts. Despite protests, homophobia is America's hottest trend.

Now Terrier plans to reach an even wider audience by releasing a follow-up single featuring a sample from the deceased king of 80's hair metal - Max Lightning's "Teri Why." But the rights to Max's song belong to his widow, the eccentric homophobe Theresa, who will only sign with Terrier on one condition: if he reunites her with her estranged son - none other than gay rights activist Christopher Dalrymple.

Rising to the challenge will force Terrier to confront his hidden past - and Theresa has secrets of her own...

== Cast ==
1. Al Thompson as Terrier Bouvier
2. Joseph P. McDonnell as Teri / Max Lightning
3. Tyler Hollinger as Christopher Dalrymple
4. Stephen Hill as Double Double
5. Jesse Teeters as Brett Dalrymple
6. Aldous Davidson as Bukaki
7. Jarrett Alexander as Sheldon AKA T-BAG
8. Christine Brumbaugh as ZMT Interviewer / Teri Schemp
9. Dan Abeles as Televangelist

== Release and reception ==
Over da Rainbow has had a very successful run on the international film festival circuit. The film appeals to both black and gay audiences in particular, and its festival pedigree reflects this. The film has played at BET's Urbanworld Film Festival, San Francisco Frameline Film Festival, Chicago Reeling Film Festival, Honolulu Rainbow Film Festival, L.A. Comedy Shorts Film Festival, Toronto Inside Out Film and Video Festival, NYC Downtown Short Film Festival, Dragon*Con Film Festival, First Run Film Festival, and others.

Over da Rainbow was chosen as the opening night event for the 2008 London Gay Pride Festival.

The film was given a glowing review in popular urban lifestyle magazine Heeb.

== Soundtrack ==
Over da Rainbow features an entirely original soundtrack, complete with three original music videos made for the film. Retrieved on January 7, 2012. Music producer Allan Fox http://www.AllanFox.com
