= McGinlay =

McGinlay is a surname. Notable people with the surname include:

- Brian McGinlay (born 1945), Scottish football referee
- Craig McGinlay, British actor
- Jim McGinlay (born 1949), Scottish bass guitarist
- John McGinlay (born 1964), Scottish footballer
- Pat McGinlay (born 1967), Scottish footballer
