= Apocalypse Clown =

2023 Irish film

- Theatrical release poster
- Directed by: George Kane
- Written by: Demian Fox; George Kane; Shane O'Brien; James Walmsley
- Produced by: Morgan Bushe; James Dean
- Starring: David Earl; Natalie Palamides; Amy De Bhrún; Fionn Foley; Ivan Kaye
- Cinematography: David Grennan
- Edited by: Matyas Veress
- Music by: Stephen McKeon
- Production companies: Fastnet Films; Namesake Films; Umedia
- Distributed by: Vertigo Films; Wildcard Distribution
- Release dates: 14 July 2023 (Galway Film Fleadh); 1 September 2023 (Ireland)
- Running time: 102 minutes
- Country: Ireland
- Language: English
- Budget: $2 million
- Box office: $12,687

Apocalypse Clown is a 2023 Irish comedy film. Set during an electricity outage in Ireland, it follows the depressed clown Bobo (David Earl), the horror movie–style clown Funzo (Natalie Palamides), the circus clown The Great Alphonso (Ivan Kaye), the mime artist Pepe (Fionn Foley) and the clickbait writer Jenny (Amy De Bhrún).

The film was written by the comedy troupe Dead Cat Bounce and directed by George Kane; they previously worked together on the 2012 mockumentary Discoverdale. It was filmed on a low budget in Dublin, Kildare and County Wicklow over three weeks. After winning Best Irish Film at an international film festival, the Galway Film Fleadh, it was released in cinemas on 1 September 2023. Critics praised the casting, particularly of Palamides, but had mixed opinions on the writing and comedy.

== Plot ==
In Dublin, Bobo refuses to accept that he has been fired from a clowning job at a hospital and continues to perform it to children, while two living statues come into conflict with Funzo, a clown who scares away children, and Pepe is lambasted by his idol Jean Ducocque after his mime act. After Ducocque dies, Jenny—a writer at a clickbait publication—is assigned to cover the funeral, after mockery from her office about a one-night stand with Bobo. Ducocque's funeral in Naherbawn is derailed: Jenny rejects Bobo's advances, a clown called The Great Alphonso announces his comeback television performance, and violence breaks out between the statues and Funzo. The attendees are jailed, but escape when a solar flare causes a widespread power outage.

Travelling by clown car, Alphonso mocks Bobo's childhood design of a dangerous three-person clown stunt. They reach a hot dog stand and learn about the chaos that has broken out from the outage. The group stays overnight with a commune in the forest until their disastrous clown show is interrupted by the statues' arrival. Alphonso kidnaps Jenny and takes her to a conspiratorial acquaintance, Tim, who claims to have predicted the flare. Jenny wants to use Tim's transmitter and Alphonso's circus tower mast to broadcast a news report. Meanwhile, the other clowns crash their car and trek across a barren wasteland. Low on morale, Funzo describes how she accidentally doused people in lighter fluid as a child. Funzo, Bobo and Pepe agree to stop dressing as clowns and use their real names: Janet, Ken and Dean, respectively. They burn their clothes.

Alphonso and Jenny arrive at the circus and Alphonso wins over child bullies to work for him. He imprisons Jenny unless she agrees to be his assistant. After recruiting Tim, Janet, Ken and Dean devise a plan to get past the children but are immediately captured when Janet releases a flare too early. Tim reveals that Alphonso drowned Tim's brother in gunge as revenge for insulting Alphonso's Fun Club.

During Alphonso's televised performance, Funzo, Bobo and Pepe adopt their clown characters again to perform the stunt Bobo designed as a child. The statues arrive and restrain Alphonso, Funzo attacks, and Bobo and Tim drown Alphonso in a pit of gunge. The clowns set up the transmitter for Jenny's news report, where she begins describing a grand conspiracy involving pedophile lizards selling harvested DNA to China. She is interrupted by electrical power returning. At the burial of Ducocque, after society has returned to normal, Jenny turns down Bobo again and Funzo, Bobo and Pepe agree to form a troupe.

== Cast ==
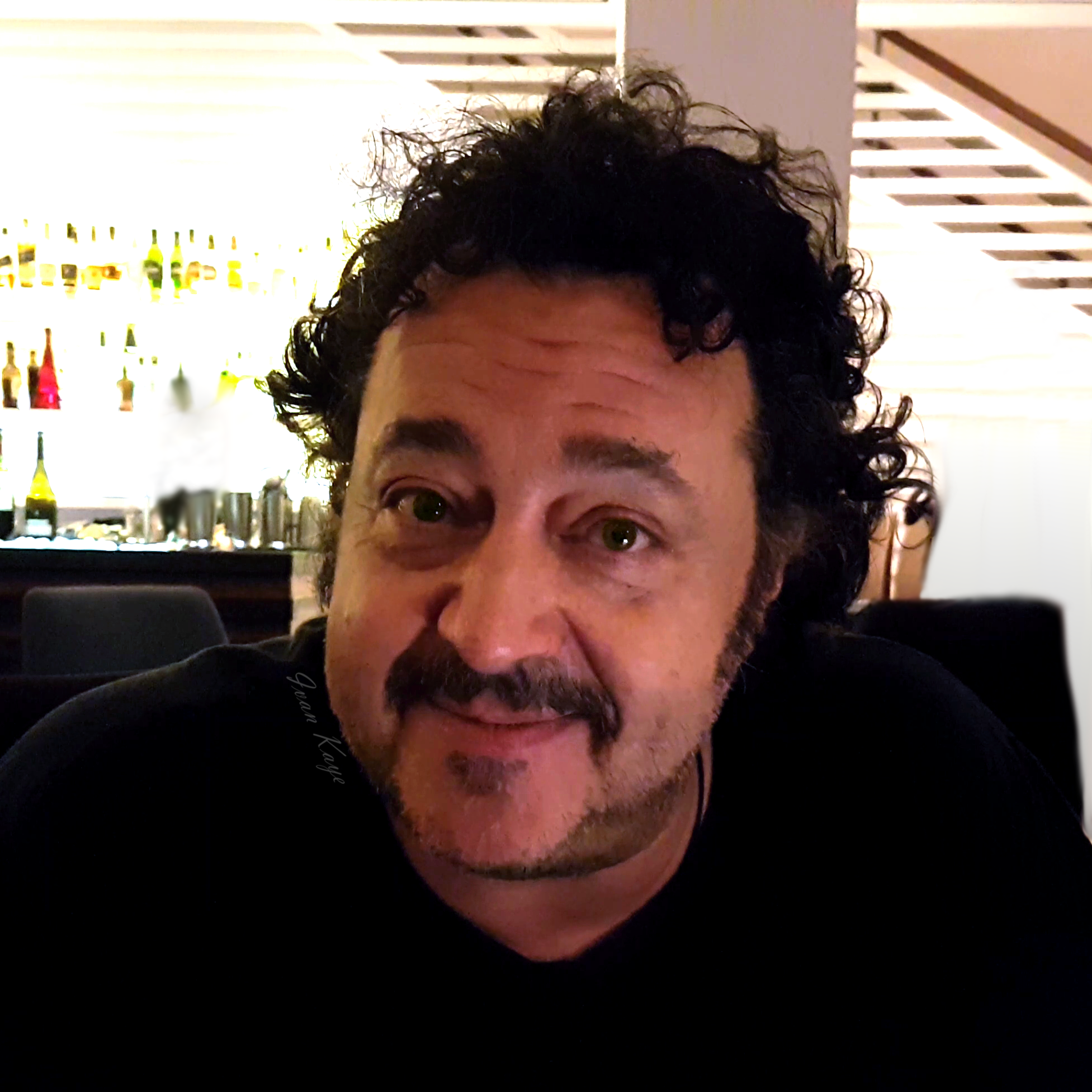
Ivan Kaye in 2019

- David Earl as Bobo, a former children's entertainer and depressed, homeless alcoholic
- Natalie Palamides as Funzo, a horror movie–style clown with an ambiguous European accent who unintentionally terrifies others with her "street clown" performances
- Ivan Kaye as The Great Alphonso, an egotistical circus performer and former television clown
- Fionn Foley as Pepe, an arrogant, classically trained but untalented mime artist
- Amy De Bhrún as Jenny Malone, a reporter with ambition beyond the clickbait outlet she works at

== Production ==
The film was written by members of the comedy troupe Dead Cat Bounce: Demian Fox, Shane O'Brien and James Walmsley. George Kane, whose previous work was in British television comedy, was the director and a co-writer. Dead Cat Bounce formed in Trinity College Dublin and had previously performed as a band. In 2012 they released a mockumentary, Discoverdale, which was shot within weeks of its conception. The mockumentary saw the band tour Europe to search for the rock band Whitesnake's lead singer David Coverdale, who Walmsley claimed was his father.

The story initially saw the main characters travel to Africa with Clowns without Borders, an idea suggested by Walmsley in the early 2010s, but the COVID-19 pandemic led to a change of ideas. Kane was inspired by the films of Roland Emmerich. He analysed that the characters "cannot let go of a profession" that becomes their identity, though they are "not necessarily born for it". He said the lack of film studio involvement allowed niche cultural references in the script, like a mention of the entertainer and child sex abuser Rolf Harris.

Filming took place on location for 23 days, across Dublin, Kildare and County Wicklow, Ireland. According to Kane, the budget was around $2 million. Despite this low budget, Kane aimed to create a "big, broad theatrical comedy" with action-adventure and "textured locations". Practical issues led to filming constraints. The scenes in Naherbawn required a town centre to be shut down, which the production could only do for one day. Forestry filming in a tent had to be completed within a day due to heavy rain. Earl contracted COVID-19 during the production, leading to use of a body double for circus scenes.

Apocalypse Clown was a co-production by Fastnet Films, Namesake Films and Umedia, with Morgan Bushe and James Dean as producers. It was funded by the Broadcasting Authority of Ireland, Vertigo Films and Screen Ireland.

== Release ==
The film debuted at the Galway Film Fleadh on 14 July 2023, followed by an appearance at the Fantasia Festival, Montreal, and cinema release on 1 September 2023. The film was released by Vertigo Films and Wildcard Distribution in the UK and Ireland, with a 15A rating from the Irish Film Classification Office. Charades handled international licensing. It grossed $12,000 from 27 screens in its first week of release in the UK. In October 2023, it was made available on Netflix in the UK.

== Reception ==
At the 2023 Galway Film Fleadh, Apocalypse Clown won Best Irish Film.

Some reviews were positive towards the writing, acting, directing and comedy. Simon Henderson of Blazing Minds gave it 4.5 stars, enjoying the pathos, humour and directing. Henderson believed that each character contributes to the story and highlighted Funzo, who "ranges from seeming innocence to apparent insanity, sometimes in the same scene". On the review aggregator website Rotten Tomatoes, 83% of 18 critics' reviews are positive. Metacritic, which uses a weighted average, assigned the film a score of 54 out of 100, based on 5 critics, indicating "mixed or average" reviews. Digital Spy's Ian Sandwell gave it four stars, writing that the strong script and cast supported the "invention and madcap energy". Sandwell lauded Palamides' "deranged and hilarious" performance for attention to detail, Earl's "wholly endearing" character and Foley's "comic timing", but criticised scenes that split up the trio.

Donald Clarke rated it three stars for Irish Times, praising the range of clowns depicted, the "antic derangement" of Palamides and the director's ability to get the "best out of comic actors in unlikely situations". The Arts Desk's Sebastian Scotney lauded the "hilarious, off the wall, beyond the cringe" film for its "well-cast actors playing engagingly wacky characters". Scotney commented that the themes were influenced by the pandemic, in which the feasibility of art was questioned.

Other reviews praised the acting, particularly by Palamides, but criticised aspects of the comedy or script. In a three-star review for The Guardian, Leslie Felperin reviewed the film as an "absurdist farce" with uneven humour but "an antic scene-stealer of a performance" by Palamides. For The List, Emma Simmonds criticised a lack of "cinematic imagination" by Kane and "hit and miss" comedy, but said the film had an "inspired" plot, good pacing and a strong cast. Joel Harley of Starburst rated it three stars, describing it as a "unique" road movie with jokes that "wear thin" despite the energy from Palamides and "bombastic" villainy from Kaye.

Fionnuala Halligan of Screen Daily found an "unsustainability" to the film's "increasingly absurd" and loosely connected sketches, as well as fast-paced but uneven comedy. Halligan said that Palamides was "always worth watching" and Earl "commits to a lovely sad-sack performance". In a two-star review, James Harvey of Why Now said that the film failed to find "joy in its solid premise", with a "depressingly mean-spirited" approach to its characters and puerile, dated humour. However, Harvey praised the "laughs and heart" of Palamides' "terrifyingly expressive" performance.
