= Saipan (film) =

2025 film by Glenn Leyburn and Lisa Barros D'Sa

- Theatrical release poster
- Directed by: Glenn Leyburn; Lisa Barros D’Sa
- Screenplay by: Paul Fraser
- Produced by: Macdara Kelleher; John Keville; Trevor Birney; Oliver Butler
- Starring: Steve Coogan; Éanna Hardwicke
- Production companies: Wild Atlantic Pictures; Fine Point Films
- Distributed by: Vertigo Releasing (United Kingdom); Wildcard Distribution (Ireland)
- Release dates: 4 September 2025 (TIFF); 26 December 2025 (Ireland); 23 January 2026 (United Kingdom)
- Running time: 90 minutes
- Countries: Ireland; United Kingdom
- Language: English
- Budget: £4.5 million
- Box office: £772,281

Saipan is a 2025 sports film directed by Glenn Leyburn and Lisa Barros D'Sa and written by Paul Fraser. It dramatises the Saipan incident, an altercation between the Republic of Ireland national football team player Roy Keane (played by Éanna Hardwicke) and their manager, Mick McCarthy (Steve Coogan), ahead of the 2002 FIFA World Cup.

== Plot ==
In 1980, eight-year-old Roy Keane plays football in a field in Cork. Years later, he has risen to stardom with Manchester United and the Republic of Ireland national team, but has taken time off due to injury. The Republic of Ireland, managed by Mick McCarthy, qualify for the 2002 FIFA World Cup by defeating Iran in a playoff in November 2001, with Keane absent.

The Irish team, including Keane, travel to Saipan in April 2002 ahead of the World Cup in Japan. On the aeroplane, Keane discusses the game with McCarthy and implies his frustration with the lack of preparation. Upon arrival, Keane is appalled by the poor quality of the hotel and the lack of proper food, and objects to his teammates' drinking and partying.

In a morning meeting, McCarthy informs the team that there has been an error in supply delivery. This, along with the training pitch's poor condition, causes Keane to confront McCarthy in a sauna. On a radio phone-in show, McCarthy's coaching is questioned due to his English birthplace, where he counteracts by stating a difference between "men from Ireland and Irish men".

Eleven days before the tournament, Keane plays a practice game and insults some of the coaches. The next day, Keane complains to McCarthy and some of the players for taking time off after an hour and storms off. Later that night, he asks McCarthy to go home due to "personal problems", but changes his mind the next day.

Eight days before the match, it is revealed that Keane leaked his thoughts to a reporter in a bar, having been told the story would not be printed until after the tournament. When McCarthy calls for a team meeting to discuss the matter, Keane insists he did nothing wrong. McCarthy accuses Keane of faking his injury, which leads to a strong reaction from Keane. Keane says that the Irish team have become a joke due to McCarthy's coaching, refers to McCarthy as English, and says that he does not "rate him as a person". This, as well as numerous insults, leads McCarthy to fire Keane.

On May 23, Keane returns home, with mixed reactions from the Irish public. In Tokyo, the team watches an interview with Keane, who admits that he does not regret leaving. Six days later, McCarthy calls Keane and asks him if he wants to come back. Keane refuses. Ireland reach the last 16 of the World Cup before losing on penalties to Spain. In Manchester, Keane plays football alone in his garden, reminiscing on the times he played football as a child in 1980.

== Cast ==
- Steve Coogan as Mick McCarthy
- Éanna Hardwicke as Roy Keane
  - Zachary Murdiff as Young Roy
- Jack Hickey as Niall Quinn
- Harriet Cains as Theresa Keane
- Niall McNamee as Alan Kelly
- Alice Lowe as Fiona McCarthy
- Alex Murphy as Eddy Power
- Jamie Beamish as Dickie Moloney
- Miles Paloma as Steven Reid
- Oliver Coopersmith as Jason McAteer
- Ross Fallows as Gary Kelly
- John Fitzmaurice as David Connolly
- Ryan Guy as Gary Breen
- Shea Harmon as Kenny Cunningham
- Jack McKee as Damien Duff
- Peter McDonald as Mick Byrne

== Production ==
The film is directed by Glenn Leyburn and Lisa Barros D’Sa from a script by Paul Fraser. It is produced by Macdara Kelleher and John Keville for Wild Atlantic Pictures along with Trevor Birney and Oliver Butler for Fine Point Films. It is made in association with Fís Éireann/Screen Ireland and Northern Ireland Screen. Paul Fraser described the script "as two impossibly complicated egos unwilling to step down and look at the consequences".

In July 2024, Steve Coogan and Éanna Hardwicke were cast in the roles of McCarthy and Keane. Jack Hickey joined as Niall Quinn the following month. Harriet Cains was cast as Keane's wife, Theresa.

Coogan told Patrick Kielty on the Late Late Show that he had "a chat" with McCarthy before portraying him, saying he "wanted to make sure that if I was going to take part in it, it was a balanced depiction". When Coogan spoke to McCarthy over the phone prior to filming, McCarthy recalled ringing Keane on the eve of the World Cup, which became a late addition to the script. Principal photography began in Belfast in August 2024. Filming also took place in Carlingford, County Louth.

== Reception ==
On the review aggregator website Rotten Tomatoes, Saipan holds an approval rating of 90% from 29 reviews. In September 2025, the film premiered at the Toronto International Film Festival and film was favourably reviewed by The Guardian and described as “the rare football movie that’s worth a replay.”

Damon Wise for Deadline called the film a "surprisingly profound soccer comedy." Robbie Collin in The Daily Telegraph commented that Coogan played McCarthy "subtly" and the film was "most entertaining when it simply pits Coogan and Hardwicke against each other as two strains of modern Irish manhood at war", providing "a watchable national identity crisis in microcosm". Phil de Semlyn in Time Out awarded the film four stars but questioned whether McCarthy was unfairly shown as a "cowed" figure akin to a "supply teacher" but noted the film was not aiming for "strict reconstruction so much as an exploration of the tensions within the Irish psyche". Evelyn O'Rourke for RTÉ praised the performances of Harriet Cairns as Theresa Keane, as well as Coogan and Hardwicke who are "authentic… never cartoonish" and also praised the "delicious archive" footage and the soundtrack with "much-loved anthems" from the era.

In The Irish Independent, Chris Wasser said that the film elicits sympathy for both Keane and McCarthy and does "well to condense a sensational real-life melodrama into a competent big-screen tragicomedy" with Hardwicke's "complex and convincing interpretation" the "undeniable star of the show". In the same publication, Paul Kimmage questioned the ethics of using real life characters and names in a fictionalised way, giving the "veneer of a documentary — news reports and radio reports and newspaper reports from the time" whilst being a work of fiction, highlighting that "Keane never said anything about Mick McCarthy’s Irishness" in reality.

Tony Cascarino, who played for Ireland alongside both Keane and McCarthy wrote in The Times that he "enjoyed the film as a piece of entertainment", praising "superb" Hardwicke, but acknowledged it as "not a completely accurate representation of either man”, with McCarthy "far tougher" than depicted and never criticised by Keane for not being Irish. Cascarino also noted that the "idea that the Saipan trip was a massive jolly for the players is also exaggerated", with professional standards risen within the team by 2002 from the early 1990s.

Ken Early in The Irish Times said it was "frustrating to think a new audience might assume the fake parts of the film's account are true". In the same publication, former player Kevin Kilbane who was part of the squad in 2002, criticised the depiction of the team's "fictionalised partying", commenting that the film "unfairly portrayed” Niall Quinn, and that both Fiona and Mick McCarthy were also given a disservice with McCarthy, far from being cowed, delivering the ultimatum that "either you go or I go, and I am going nowhere". Kilbane also noted the height difference between Coogan and McCarthy, saying that “Roy didn’t loom over Mick. Nobody did.”

== Release ==
The film was released first in preview screenings in Ireland on 26 December 2025, before going into general release on 1 January. It was released in the United Kingdom on 23 January 2026 by Vertigo Releasing.

== Accolades ==
In January 2026, the film received 12 nominations at the Irish Film & Television Awards, including for best film and best director, with Coogan and Hardwicke both nominated for best lead actor. Hardwicke eventually won best lead actor.

== See also ==
- Saipan incident
