= Sanctuary: A Witch's Tale =

2023 American supernatural TV series

- Genre: Supernatural drama; Fantasy; Thriller
- Created by: Debbie Horsfield
- Based on: Sanctuary: A Novel of Suspense, Witchcraft, and Small Town Secrets by V.V. James
- Starring: Elaine Cassidy; Hazel Doupe; Stephanie Levi-John; Amy De Bhrún; Valerie O'Connor; Kelly Campbell; Stephen Lord
- Original language: English
- No. of seasons: 2
- No. of episodes: 13

Production
- Executive producers: V.V. James; Debbie Horsfield; Debra Hayward; Alison Owen; Alison Carpenter; Karen Richards; Guymon Casady
- Production companies: AMC Studios; Monumental Television

Original release
- Network: AMC+
- Release: January 4, 2024 – present

Sanctuary: A Witch's Tale is an American supernatural drama television series written and created by Debbie Horsfield based on the 2020 novel Sanctuary: A Novel of Suspense, Witchcraft, and Small Town Secrets by V.V. James. The first season premiered on January 4, 2024, on Sundance Now. In August 2024, the series was renewed for a second season, which premiered on December 25, 2025.

== Synopsis ==
In the fictional small English town of Sanctuary, witches have lived openly for centuries as accepted and sacred members of the community. Sarah Fenn is a witch whom the townspeople rely on for remedies when other methods have failed. When Dan Whithall, a local teen, a rugby captain and a bully, is pushed to his death at a party, his mother Abigail, out of grief, begins a modern witch hunt against Sarah, believing her son to be a saint and Sarah's daughter Harper, whom Dan betrayed and abused, to be the cause of Dan's death.

== Cast and characters ==
=== Main ===
- Elaine Cassidy as Sarah Fenn
- Hazel Doupe as Harper Fenn
- Stephanie Levi-John as DCI Maggie Knight
- Amy De Bhrún as Abigail Whithall
- Valerie O'Connor as Bridget Paterson
- Kelly Campbell as Julia Garston
- Stephen Lord as Ted Bolt

=== Recurring ===
- Adam Isla O'Brien as Ryan Greenhoff
- Barry John Kinsella as Michael Whithall
- Daniel Adegboyega as Pierre Martineau
- Keith McErlean as Albie Garston
- Darragh Gilhooly as Jake Bolt
- Holly Sturton as Beatrice Garston
- Sophie Mensah as Cheryl Lee
- Chris Newman as Remy
- Cal O'Driscoll as Ollie
- Elish Liburd as Izzy Paterson
- Helen Norton as Mary Ann Bolt
- Danielle Ryan as Ana Dao
- Roisin Murphy as Emily
- Jon De Barra as Freddie
- Justin Daniels Anene as Dale

== Episodes ==
=== Series Overview ===
Season	Episodes	Originally released	
Season	Episodes	First released	Last released
1	7	January 4, 2024	February 8, 2024
2	6	December 25, 2025	January 29, 2026

=== Season 1 (2024) ===
No. overall	No. in season	Title	Directed by	Written by	Original release date
1	1	"Episode 1"	Lisa Mulcahy	V.V. James and Debbie Horsfield	January 4, 2024
2	2	"Episode 2"	Lisa Mulcahy	V.V. James and Debbie Horsfield	January 4, 2024
3	3	"Episode 3"	Lisa Mulcahy	V.V. James and Debbie Horsfield	January 11, 2024
4	4	"Episode 4"	Justin Molotnikov	V.V. James, Jessica Ruston, and Debbie Horsfield	January 18, 2024
5	5	"Episode 5"	Justin Molotnikov	V.V. James, Gabbie Asher, and Debbie Horsfield	January 25, 2024
6	6	"Episode 6"	Justin Molotnikov	V.V.James and Debbie Horsfield	February 1, 2024
7	7	"Episode 7"	Justin Molotnikov	Debbie Horsfield	February 8, 2024

=== Season 2 (2025) ===
No. overall	No. in season	Title	Directed by	Written by	Original release date
8	1	"Episode 1"	Hannah Quinn	V.V. James, Susie Conklin, and Debbie Horsfield	December 25, 2025
9	2	"Episode 2"	Hannah Quinn	V.V. James, Susie Conklin, and Debbie Horsfield	January 1, 2026
10	3	"Episode 3"	Hannah Quinn	V.V. James, Elinor Cook, and Debbie Horsfield	January 8, 2026
11	4	"Episode 4"	Dathaí Keane	V.V. James, Chloe Moss, and Debbie Horsfield	January 15, 2026
12	5	"Episode 5"	Dathaí Keane	Unknown	January 22, 2026
13	6	"Episode 6"	Dathaí Keane	Unknown	January 29, 2026

== Production ==
=== Development ===
In August 2022, Sundance Now announced it had commissioned a new series Sanctuary based on the novel of the same name by V.V. James, who will also serve as an executive producer alongside Debra Hayward, Alison Owen, Alison Carpenter, Karen Richards, Debbie Horsfield, and Guymon Casady. Horsfield will also be serving as a writer on the series alongside Jess Ruston and Gabbie Asher. The series is directed by Lisa Mulcahy and Justin Molotnikov. Sanctuary is an AMC production in partnership with Monumental Television.

=== Casting ===
In August 2022 the cast was announced to include Elaine Cassidy, Hazel Doupe, Stephanie Levi-John, and Amy De Bhrún. Further cast members were announced in October and December 2023 including Valerie O'Connor, Kelly Campbell, Stephen Lord, Darragh Gilhooly, Adam Isla O’Brien, Elish Liburd, Barry John Kinsella, and Sophie Mensah.

== Release ==
Sanctuary: A Witch’s Tale debuted with a two-episode premiere on January 4, 2024, exclusively on Sundance Now and AMC+, with new episodes airing weekly. The series premiered on AMC on January 5, 2025.
