= Lisa Dwan =

Irish actress (born 1977)

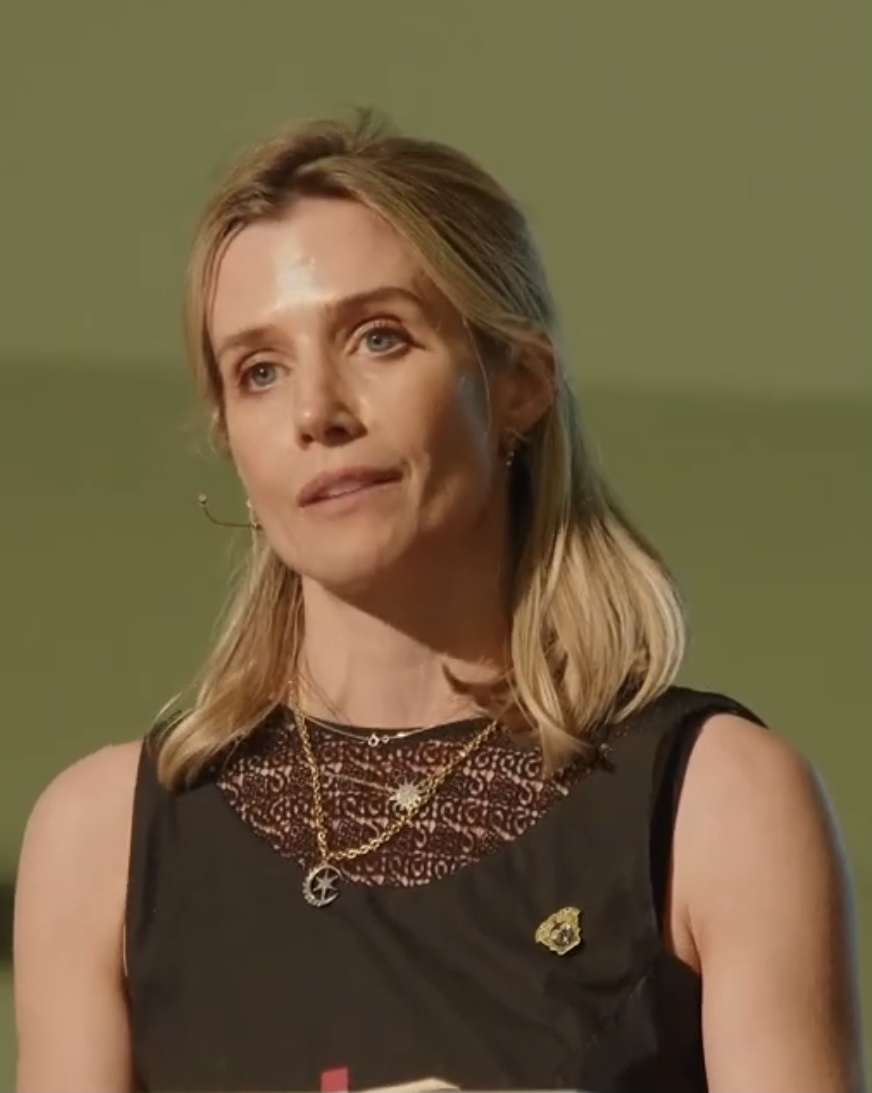
- Dwan at the British Library in 2022
- Born: November 25, 1977 (age 48); Coosan, County Westmeath, Ireland
- Occupation: Actor
- Years active: 1997–present

Lisa Dwan (born November 25, 1977) is an Irish actress. She is best known for her work in theatre, performing in Samuel Beckett adaptations among other works. She began her career in the Fox Kids series Mystic Knights of Tir Na Nog (1998–1999). More recently, she starred in the Netflix series Top Boy (2019–2023), and then in MobLand (2025). She also appeared in the RTÉ soap opera Fair City (2006–2007) and the ITV drama Rock Rivals (2008).

== Early life and education ==
Lisa Dwan was born in 1977 in Coosan, County Westmeath, Ireland.

She originally trained as a ballet dancer. She left school at 14 after winning a scholarship to attend the Dorothy Stevens School of Ballet in Leeds.

== Career ==
=== Screen ===
Dwan's debut acting role in a feature film was playing the role of Agnes in the 1997 film adaptation of Oliver Twist, co-starring Elijah Wood and Richard Dreyfuss.

Dwan's first regular TV series role was as Princess Deirdre, the Mystic Knight of Air, on Saban's Mystic Knights of Tir Na Nog. She played the role of Orla in eight episodes of RTÉ's "The Big Bow Wow" in 2004, the role of Zoe Burke in 28 episodes of the Irish soap opera Fair City from 2006 to 2007, and the role of Angel Islington on Rock Rivals.

In January 2009 she starred opposite Martin Sheen as "Marika" in Bhopal: Prayer for Rain.

In 2021, Dwan played Tori Matthews opposite James Nesbitt in the BBC drama Bloodlands. In 2024 she played the lead role as DI Fia Lucey in Blackshore. In 2025 she played O'Hara in MobLand.

=== Stage ===
Dwan is most well known internationally for her performances and adaptations of Samuel Beckett's works. Kate Kellaway has called her an "Irish actor and Beckett interpreter of the first rank". She performed in Beckett's Not I in London's Battersea Arts Centre in 2005, and was interviewed with Billie Whitelaw, whom Beckett called the "perfect actress", as part of the Beckett celebrations on BBC Radio 3. Beginning in 2006, Whitelaw mentored Dwan on her work on Beckett. Dwan performed the piece again in July 2009 at the Southbank Centre in London in a time of nine minutes and fifty seconds, and again at the International Beckett Festival in 2012. She replicated the feat at Reading University the next year. Beginning in 2013, Dwan toured with "The Beckett Trilogy", consisting of Not I alongside two of Beckett's other short plays, Footfalls and Rockaby, under the direction of Walter Asmus at the Royal Court Theatre, West End, The Barbican Centre, and the Brooklyn Academy of Music, and performed sold-out shows at various international locations. In a review of her performance at the Brooklyn Academy of Music, Ben Brantley wrote that Dwan "is an instrument of Beckett, in that way saints and martyrs are said to be instruments of God".

In October 2016, Dwan adapted and starred in No's Knife, a one-woman production adapted from Beckett's Stories and Texts for Nothing at London's Old Vic and Abbey Theatre in Dublin. Dwan is the first woman to perform Beckett's Stories and Texts for Nothing.

In 2017, Dwan starred in Harold Pinter's The Lover and The Collection at the Shakespeare Theatre Company in Washington, D.C., for which she won the theatre's Emery Battis Award for Acting Excellence.

In 2016, Dwan starred in Marina Carr's stage adaptation of Anna Karenina for the Abbey Theatre. Other recent theatre appearances include Shining City off-Broadway and at the Irish Repertory Theatre in 2016, Beside the Sea at the Southbank Centre in London in 2012, Margot, Diary of an Unhappy Queen in at the Barbican Centre in London in 2012, The Journey Between Us at Southbank Theatre in London in 2016, Illusions by Ivan Viripaev at the Bush Theatre in London, The Soldier's Tale at the Hay Festival in 2013, The Importance of Being Earnest on tour in Ireland in 1999, and The History of the World at 3am at Andrews Lane Theatre in Dublin in 1996, among others.

=== Other activities ===
Dwan regularly writes, lectures, and teaches on theatre, gender, and Beckett. Recent speaking engagements include appearances on BBC radio and television and WNYC. Dwan also writes about Beckett and the arts, including in The Guardian.

She has lectured at the École Normale Supérieure, University of Reading and the University of Oxford. She completed a residency at Princeton University's Lewis Center for the Arts, where she taught a class on adapting Beckett's prose work. Dwan was also a 2017–2018 artist in residence at Columbia University, where she worked with Irish writer Colm Tóibín on Pale Sister, a play derived from the class they taught called "The Antigone Project". Dwan was a resident fellow at the School of Art and Ballet at New York University from 2017 to 2018.

Dwan was an artist in residence at MIT from 2018 until 2021.

== Personal life ==
As of 2026, Dwan is engaged to Paul Henninger, with whom she has a daughter.

== Filmography ==
=== Film ===
Year	Title	Role	Notes
1998	Bloodlines: Legacy of a Lord	Aspinall's Maid	
2000	Moving Target	Kate	Credited as Lisa Duane
2001	Sparrowhawk	Unknown	Short film
2001	The Tailor of Panama	Stewardess	
2006	Pop Shot	Kate	Short film
2016	An Afterthought	Wendy Darling	Short film
2014	Bhopal: A Prayer for Rain	Marika	
2014	The Engagement	Vicky	Short film
2017	The Poet and the Emperor	Expert	BBC documentary

=== Television ===
Year	Title	Role	Notes
1997	Oliver Twist	Agnes	The Wonderful World of Disney film
1998–1999	Mystic Knights of Tir Na Nog	Princess Deirdre	50 episodes
2004	The Big Bow Wow	Orla	5 episodes
2006–2007	Fair City	Zoe Burke	28 episodes
2008	Rock Rivals	Angel Islington	8 episodes
2015	Artsnight	Contributor and writer	1 episode, Richard Wilson on Samuel Beckett
2018	Trust	June	1 episode, "Lone Star"
2019–2022	Top Boy	Lizzie	18 episodes
2021	Bloodlands	Dr Tori Matthews	4 episodes
2024	Blackshore	DI Fia Lucey	6 episodes
2025	MobLand	O'Hara Delaney	10 episodes
