= Amy De Bhrún =

Irish actress

- Born: Dublin, Ireland
- Education: Trinity College Dublin
- Occupations: Actress; Writer
- Years active: 2018–present
- Television: Blackshore (2024); Borderline (2024)

Amy De Bhrún is an Irish stage, television and film actress and writer. Her leading roles in television series include Blackshore (2024) and Borderline (2024).

== Early life and education ==
Amy De Bhrún was born in Dublin, Ireland. Her mother worked as a drama teacher.

She grew up in Rathfarnham in south Dublin and attended Trinity College Dublin for three months prior to moving to London at the age of 19 to attend drama school.

== Career ==
De Bhrún had small early roles on The Southbank Show and in a feature film called Bigga Than Ben.

She wrote and performed six different one-woman shows on stage in Dublin, London, Los Angeles, and New York City. She also appeared in music videos, including Kodaline's single "All I Want" and The Coronas' "All The Others". She appeared on stage at the official launch of Herstory at The Rotunda in May 2016 and a female-led show I See You, both performances about Lady Mary Heath, in 2019.

In film, De Bhrún appeared alongside Andre 3000 in the Jimi Hendrix biopic, Jimi: All Is by My Side (2013), as Rachel in the Irish comedy feature film The Stag (2013), as well as alongside Matt Damon, Alicia Vikander, and Tommy Lee Jones in action thriller film Jason Bourne (2016). She also had a leading role in Irish comedy film Apocalypse Clown (2023).

Her television credits include Coronation Street, Ingregird in Vikings, and horror drama series Penny Dreadful. During the COVID-19 pandemic she hosted her own interview podcast, Year of the Selfie. In 2021, she played Steph Corbett, opposite Stephen Graham, in series five and six of BBC One crime drama Line of Duty.

In 2024 De Bhrún played Niamh Furlong in the RTE One television series Blackshore. Also in 2024, she played DI Aoife Regan opposite Eoin Macken in Borderline, and appeared in the American series Sanctuary: A Witch's Tale.

De Bhrún wrote and starred in the short film Samhain (2026), about a mother searching for her missing son who has autism and has gone missing from preschool.

== Personal life ==
De Bhrún married director Sean Branigan, and they have two children.

== Partial filmography ==
Year	Title	Role	Notes
2008	Bigga then Ben	Bookshop Girl	Film
2013	Jimi: All Is by My Side	Phoebe	Film
2013	The Stag	Rachel	Film
2013	Casualty	Alana Nicholson	
2014	Penny Dreadful	Prostitute	1 episode
2016	Jason Bourne	Hub tech	Film
2017	The Cured	Journalist	Film
2018	Coronation Street	Adele McHoughton	4 episodes
2018–2019	The Outpost	Meadhbh	2 episodes
2019–2021	Line of Duty	Steph Corbett	7 episodes
2019–2020	Vikings	Jarl Hrolf	3 episodes
2020	Hope Street	Kate McVeigh	1 episode
2022	Harry Wild	Felicity O'Malley	1 episode
2022	Bad Sisters	Nadia	1 episode
2022	No Worries if Not!	Claire	1 episode
2023	Apocalypse Clown	Jenny Malone	Film
2023	Lu & the Bally Bunch	Lu's mam	27 episodes; Voice role
2024	Sanctuary: A Witch's Tale	Abigail Whitall	7 episodes
2024	Small Things like These	Emma	Film
2024	Blackshore	Niamh Furlong	6 episodes
2024	Borderline	DI Aoife Regan	6 episodes
2026	Samhain	Emma	Short film; Also writer
2027	Wind of Change†		Film
