= Mystic Knights of Tir Na Nog =

Television series

- Genre: Superhero fiction; Action/Adventure; High fantasy; Sword and sorcery; Drama
- Created by: Haim Saban
- Starring: Lochlann Ó Mearáin; Lisa Dwan; Justin Pierre; Vincent Walsh; Stephen Brennan; Barry Cassin; Charlotte Bradley; Gerry O'Brien; Ned Dennehy; Peadar Lamb; Kelly Campbell; Ben Palmer
- Voices of: Ned Dennehy; Shaun Elebert; Enda Kilroy
- Composers: Shuki Levy; Kussa Mahchi; Inon Zur
- Countries of origin: Ireland; United States
- No. of seasons: 1
- No. of episodes: 50

Production
- Executive producer: Haim Saban
- Producers: Robert Hughes; Lauren A. Levine
- Production location: Ireland
- Production companies: Saban Entertainment; Sharpmist, Ltd.; Renaissance-Atlantic Films

Original release
- Network: Fox Kids
- Release: September 12, 1998 – May 7, 1999

Mystic Knights of Tir Na Nog is a fantasy-adventure television series set in a fantasy version of ancient Ireland, created by Saban Entertainment. It was loosely based on actual Irish mythology. The name is derived from Tír na nÓg, the Otherworld of Irish mythology. It was Saban's first fantasy series to involve knights, dragons, and wizards. It aired on the Fox Kids Network from September 12, 1998, to May 7, 1999.

The resulting series was an attempt in doing an original non-Japanese special-effects series rather than adapting from actual Japanese tokusatsu.

Ownership of the series passed to Disney in 2001 following Saban Entertainment's closure.

== Plot ==
On an unnamed island, queen Maeve of Temra seeks to conquer the peaceful kingdom of Kells and enlists the evil fairy Mider, who gives her the mystical Rune Stone allowing Maeve to use sorcery. Queen Maeve mostly uses the Rune Stone to create or summon monsters whom she sends to wreak havoc. When King Conchobar of Kells seeks a way to protect his kingdom, protagonist Rohan—a druid's apprentice—goes in search of the prophesied hero Draganta, with his friend the reformed thief Angus.

Later joined by the foreign Prince Ivar, and Conchobar's daughter, Princess Deirdre, they are drawn into Tír Na nÓg, whose king Fin Varra puts the group through various tests to determine their worthiness. The heroes having passed these tests, King Fin Varra gives them certain weapons granting control of the classical elements Fire, Air, Water and Earth. Thereafter the four overcome Mider's Evil Sentinels (recurring villains in the series) to capture corresponding suits of armor, and oppose the various monsters created by Maeve, assisted by the winged fairy Aideen. Subsequently, Rohan gains a new partner in Pyre the dragon, who later identifies Rohan as Draganta. Later in the series, another Mystic Knight emerges, in the form of Prince Garrett of Rheged, who joins the others after they free him from Maeve's telepathic control.

With her powers nearly exhausted, queen Maeve summons the monster Lugad, who is more powerful than any previous creation and was trained and mutated by Maeve's teacher Nemain. It was discovered that Lugad and Rohan are both Maeve's abandoned sons. In the series finale, they cooperate with the other Mystic Knights to defeat Maeve, whom King Conchobar banishes to another island. As for Nemain, she has claimed the Silver Chalice that Ivar sought to reclaim as Mider enters an alliance with her.

== Characters ==
=== Mystic Knights ===
- Rohan (portrayed by Lochlann Ó Mearáin) – An orphan raised by the druid Cathbad, Rohan is noble, courageous and steadfast. His weapon is the Sword of Kells, which can emit fire. He also has possession of the Dragon's Breath Dagger, which he uses to summon Pyre, the Dragon of Dare. To win his red and gold Mystic Armor, he had to defeat the Ice Lord of Temra. To don his armor, he shouts "Fire within me!". He is also identified as the mighty warrior Draganta, who is destined to bring peace to Kells for 100 lifetimes. Later in the series, Rohan obtains the ability to become more powerful by the war cry, "Battle Fury!" When he has his armor made powerful in the forge within the Mountains of Gloom, his Battle Fury armor is crimson and gold. Eventually it is also revealed that he is the son of Queen Maeve, with Lugad as his half-brother.

Fiercely independent princess Deirdre (Lisa Dwan).

- Deirdre (portrayed by Lisa Dwan) – The princess of Kells. Her weapon is the Whirlwind Crossbow, which shoots a burst of air. To win her white and gold Mystic Armor, she had to defeat the Lightning Bat of Temra. To don her armor, she speaks the words "Air above me!". Deirdre is the most logical-minded of the Mystic Knights, and is therefore sometimes frustrated by her companions' foibles.
- Ivar (portrayed by Justin Pierre) – A prince from a distant land, Ivar came to Kells in search of his country's sacred chalice. It was later revealed the chalice was stolen by Torc, Maeve's general. His weapon is the Barbed Trident which shoots blue bolts of electricity. To obtain his blue and gold Armor, he had to defeat the Sea Serpent of Temra. To don his armor, he speaks the words "Water around me!" Ivar is loyal to his friends but can be distracted by his search for the stolen chalice, often to his own detriment. He later gains the Defender vehicle (which was meant to be used for Lugad) from Torc.
- Angus – (portrayed by Vincent Walsh) - Angus is Rohan's best friend and a well-known, boastful reformed thief who often gets into trouble. His weapon is the Terra Sling Mace which throws giant boulders and can cause earthquakes. To obtain his silver and gold Mystic Armor, he had to defeat the Rock Wolf of Temra. To don his armor, he speaks the words "Earth beneath me!".
- Garrett (portrayed by Ben Palmer) – Garrett is the prince of Rheged, an ally of Kells. Garrett and Deirdre were promised in marriage and therefore, Garrett first came to Kells to claim his bride. Prior to joining the other knights, he was magically controlled by Maeve, leading him to act against the knights in wicked fashion. However, they eventually freed him with a magic potion and he joined the team. Garrett has a unique ability to command any animal by locking eyes with it, which seems to be independent of his status as a Mystic Knight. His weapons are the Twin Timber Axes which shoot a beam of energy. To obtain his brown and gold Mystic Armor, he had to defeat a giant spider that dwelled in the Banshee Woods. To don his armor, he speaks the words "Forest before me!". In exchange for returning princess Lynette to her homeland, Garrett was given the Dragon Bow Vehicle and he returned with it when the Mystic Knights were facing Lugad. Garrett serves the same role as a "Sixth Ranger" does in many Power Rangers series, supplementing the original team for a time before departing and returning at the climax of their adventures. His storyline is similar to that of Tommy Oliver.

=== Allies ===
- King Conchobar (portrayed by Stephen Brennan) – Conchobar is the king of Kells and the father of Deirdre. With Maeve using dark magic to try to help her win the war between their kingdoms, he is in desperate need of the Mystic Knights' help.
- Cathbad (portrayed by Barry Cassin) – A druid and advisor to King Conchobar. He also raised Rohan when he was an orphan. A father figure who did his best to raise Rohan as an apprentice. Cathbad is opposed to Rohan's hanging around with Angus because he tends to cause trouble. He can foresee the future and mentors the Mystic Knights. Cathbad's powers can rival Maeve's, but are limited largely to extra-sensory perception. In "Battle of the Druids", it was revealed that his teacher was Seethchenn who had recently allied with Maeve. Cathbad managed to vanquish his teacher in a druid battle.
- King Fin Varra (portrayed by Peadar Lamb) – The King of Tir Na Nóg. A fairy with great power who gives the Mystic Knights their weapons, as well as occasional advice. He is the rival of the dark fairy Mider.
- Aideen (portrayed by Kelly Campbell) – A sprite who assists the Mystic Knights. She has affection for Rohan and is consequently jealous of Deirdre.
- Princess Lynette (portrayed by Aisling Flitton) - The princess of a faraway kingdom. She became shipwrecked due to an attack by a beast called the Grindon which had been pursuing her for quite some time. Grindon came to the island of Kells in search for her and attacked the kingdom's warriors and the Mystic Knights but fled after a lengthy battle. It later attacked the castle, but was repelled by the Mystic Knights. Lynette warned them that it would return at sunset before attempting to leave the castle for their safety, but the Mystic Knights convinced her to stay while devising a plan to lure the Grindon out into the opening. Finally Princess Lynette and Rohan use his sword and slay the Grindon, which she alone could do which as it turned out to be the reason was why Grindon had been pursuing her. After the monster's final defeat, Garrett became her personal escort; with implications of feelings blossoming between them.
- Pyre: Dragon of Dare – An ancient dragon associated with the Mystic Knight of Fire. At first unwilling to tolerate any human presence, he soon comes to admire Rohan and later recognizes the Knight as Draganta, the legendary hero. Fiercely the rival of Tyrune the Hydra. Pyre wears a gem-studded cuirass, through which he presumably makes contact with the Dragon's Breath Dagger wielded by Rohan. His likeness is worked into the Mystic Knights' armor. To summon Pyre, Rohan would hold out the Dragon's Breath Dagger and quote "Pyre: Dragon of Dare, I summon you".

=== Villains ===
- Queen Maeve (portrayed by Charlotte Bradley) – Maeve is the queen of Temra. She believes that being the ruler of Kells is her birthright, so she recruits the help of the dark fairy Mider. She is later revealed as the mother of both Rohan and Lugad. In the final battle, she takes over Kells until Lugad frees the captive Knights during her fight with Rohan. She uses her magic to assume the form of a naga-like creature with eye beams. Upon being defeated and regressing back to her human form by the combined powers of Rohan and Lugad, Maeve is banished to another island by King Conchobar. As she sees her son for the last time, Rohan himself asks if Maeve has anything to say to him before she is banished. She then replies that he's been trained well and that he's a great warrior except that he's just on the wrong side. Rohan asks her to be taken away.
- Torc (portrayed by Gerry O'Brien) – Maeve's general who was a former general in Kells before he betrayed them. He stole a silver chalice from Ivar's kingdom, which Maeve needed to enable Mider to travel back and forth between Temra and his realm of dark magic. During the time Lugad was with Maeve, Torc used the Defender vehicle that was meant for Lugad only to lose it to Ivar. In the final battle, he learns that Maeve has been defeated and flees with his army as the Knights have defeated her. As it was mentioned that Torc and his men were last seen fleeing to the woods, Cathbad states that the Temrans are no longer a threat.
- Mider (portrayed by Ned Dennehy) – A dark fairy who helps Maeve with dark magic. He uses the silver chalice from Ivar's kingdom to transport back and forth between a dark realm to increase his powers. After Maeve's defeat and banishment, he aligned himself with the sorceress Nemain.
- The Four Sentinels of Temra – These are the four beings that the Knights had to fight in order to gain their Mystic Armor. They later fell under the control of Maeve, having formerly served their creator Mider.
  - The Ice Lord of Temra (portrayed by Shaun Elebert) – A skull-headed ice lord and Queen Maeve's main general. He fights with a curved ice sword. Rohan fought him in order to gain his Mystic Armor.
  - The Lightning Bat of Temra (portrayed by Ned Dennehy) – A bat-headed member of the Four Sentinels. Deirdre fought him in order to gain her Mystic Armor. He wields a bat-shaped boomerang.
  - The Sea Serpent of Temra (portrayed by Enda Kilroy) – A sea serpent-headed member of the Four Sentinels. He uses a weapon called the Serpent-Tongued Whip. Ivar fought him in order to gain his Mystic Armor.
  - The Rock Wolf of Temra (portrayed by Ned Dennehy) – A wolf-headed member of the Four Sentinels. Angus fought him in order to gain his armor. He wields a set of claws on his forearm and a sword.
- Bogies – Little people who work as spies for Queen Maeve.
- Tyrune – Tyrune is the three-headed hydra of Temra. Maeve tricked Rohan into saying a druid incantation that released Tyrune from his imprisonment. This giant flying creature sometimes attacks without any warning. Often fights Pyre as they are rival dragons. Tyrune's heads can separate from its body and can attack independently.
- Lugad (portrayed by Eric O'Cuinn) – Lugad was brought in near the end of the season. He is a half-human, half-demon creature and raised primarily by the sorceress Nemain who was responsible for his mutation. Lugad is the other son of Maeve and the half-brother of Rohan. He eventually turns against Maeve to help Rohan defeat her and leaves Kells. Before Lugad leaves, king Conchobar tells Lugad that he is always welcomed in Kells.
- Nemain (portrayed by Sharon Hogan) – The former ruler of Temra until her student Maeve took it over by force. Since that day, she dwelt in a ruined castle and was seemingly content to raise and mutate Lugad on Maeve's behalf. When Maeve retrieved Lugad, Nemain now and then aided the Mystic Knights in the disguise of an old man. When Maeve is defeated, Nemain reveals herself and claims the Silver Chalice declaring her revenge on Maeve complete. Shortly thereafter, Mider proposes an alliance with Nemain to take over Tir Na Nog and Kells. Nemain tells him that she will think about it.

=== Monsters ===
These are the monsters that the Mystic Knights battle:

- Ogre (1 and 2) – This was the first monster Queen Maeve summoned in her war against Kells. It can shoot fireballs from its mouth. Maeve used it to attack Kells. It was too much for the army of Kells until Rohan and the others arrived. Following the Temran army's retreat, Maeve sent the Ogre into battle. With a combination of their weapons, Rohan and the others destroyed the Ogre.
- Juggernaut (3) – While Rohan was fighting the Ice Lord of Temra, Queen Maeve created an invincible Juggernaut from a living rock to attack the others. It can shoot boulders from its mouth. Once Rohan had obtained his armor, he helped to destroy it.
- Tash Hound of Temra (4) – When Rohan fell into Maeve's trap, he ended up fighting the Tash Hound of Temra. It was a two-headed dog (similar to Orthrus of Greek Mythology) that can disappear into the shadows. Once Deirdre had obtained her armor, she helped Rohan defeat the Tash Hound of Temra.
- Cyclops (5) – A one-eyed monster with Ipotane-like legs and a lizard-like tail. Maeve sent it to attack a village. Very stupid, but nearly invulnerable. Once Ivar got his armor, the Knights defeated this monster.
- Bull of Temra (6) – After Angus was rescued, Maeve summoned this minotaur-like monster to fight the knights. It has two sets of horns: one set was composed of small stubby horns, and the other ram-like horns. It can shoot electrical-like beams from its small horns. Once Angus got his armor, the monster was defeated.
- Unnamed Creature #1 (15) – Cathbad's teacher Seethchenn predicted that a monster will cross Darkness Loch and attack Kells. At the same time, Maeve summoned this lizard-faced monster with dragon wings, four tendrils for arms and a snake tail for legs to attack Kells. The Mystic Knights fought this monster at Darkness Loch and repelled it.
- Water Creature (20) – A Plesiosaurus/Water Dragon-resembling creature with a long tongue that dwells in the waters in Valley Long. Queen Maeve had it attack Rohan, Ivar, and Angus. It ended up swallowing Ivar. Rohan and Angus tried to get the monster to swallow up Ivar's trident. With Deirdre's help, Ivar got his trident and used his trident to get the Water Creature to spit it out before the Water Creature was destroyed by the Mystic Knights.
- Unnamed Flying Creature (21) – A fire-shooting stork/pteranodon creature with ram-like horns. Queen Maeve summoned it to target Prince Garrett. It ran afoul of Rohan and Angus in the first encounter. By the next encounter, Garrett used his special ability to command the creature to return to where it came from and to never to come to Kells again.
- Giant Spider (24) – Garret had to face the Giant Spider in Banshee Woods in order to get his Mystic Knight armor.
- Spectres of the Banshee Woods (24) – When Garrett was told by King Fin Varra that his test to obtain his Mystic Knight armor, Midar summoned 4 of these evil spectres to attack the Mystic Knights. The spectres ranged from an ant spectre, a porcupine/stingray spectre, a trilobite spectre, and a bat spectre. Garrett sought out his armor while the Mystic Knights fought these spectres. Once Garrett obtained his armor, he defeated these spectres. (Note: The Spectres of the Banshee Woods are recycled versions of the Beetleborgs monsters Shellator and Count Fangula's Bat Monster form and the B-Fighter Kabuto monsters Flame Ant Beast Baeria and Darkness Combined Beast Arajibiray (unused in Beetleborgs Metallix).)
- Giant Falcon (25) – Mider gave Maeve and Torc a falcon that will retrieve a map leading to a special dragon egg that Angus recently hid. Upon Rohan and Angus encountering Maeve and her army, she used the Runestone to turn it into a monster. Rohan and Angus don their armors and fight it. Aideen alerts the other knights and Deirdre and Ivar join the battle and repel the Giant Falcon.
- Wyvern (27) – A legless Wyvern who can shoot energy beams from its tail. At first, the Mystic Knights thought the invading Northmen that captured King Conchobar had control of it. It was actually Mider who had the Wyvern summoned on Maeve's behalf to set up the Northmen in a threat to invade the entire island. Rohan, Angus and Garrett engage the Wyvern. As Garrett heads off to rescue King Conchobar from Maeve, Rohan and Angus's attacks weren't even having effect on the Wyvern. It was defeated by Pyre.
- Fire Creature (29) – When Angus was on trial for crimes he did not commit, Mider had Maeve summon a fiery creature to attack Kells. Rohan and Deirdre engaged the Fire Creature. When Ivar catches the real thief hired by Maeve and Angus is declared innocent, they joined the fight against the Fire Creature. With help from Pyre, the Mystic Knights vanquish the Fire Creature.
- Spiked Warrior (32) – After Maeve reclaimed the Silver Chalice from Kells, she summoned this unnamed trident-wielding spikey warrior to attack the Mystic Knights. Rohan, Deirdre, and Angus don their armor and were no match for it. When Ivar fired his trident attack on the Silver Chalice, it shot out energy that destroyed the monster. (Note: This unnamed spikey monster is actually a repainted version of Emily the Seed of Evil from Beetleborgs.)
- Phantom Boar (33) – Mider unleashed this ghostly boar to attack King Conchobar and Lady Fionna (who was Queen Maeve in disguise). King Conchobar defeated it easily with one hit from his sword.
- Worm of Woe (34) – To ensure that King Conchobar and King Fin Varra don't fulfill a prophecy where they have to sit on each other's thrones for a day, Queen Maeve unleashes the Worm of Woe upon Tir Na Nóg. It managed to disarm Rohan and Ivar of their weapons and corner them. Aideen arrives to distract it while Rohan and Ivar grab their weapons and armor up. Rohan and Ivar combined their attacks to destroy the Worm of Woe.
- Chimera (38) – When Prince Gann got hold of Maeve's scepter, he used its magic to summon this flying three-headed composite monster with fiery breath. Maeve had Torc evade it to get her scepter. With the scepter recovered, Maeve took control of it and sent it after Gann. The Mystic Knights encountered it attacking Gann. While Rohan went to rescue him, the others armored up and fought the monster. After Rohan reclaimed his sword and repelled Torc, he helped the others to defeat the monster.
- Grindon (39) – This flying, barb-breathing monster is a scourge in Princess Lynette's homeland. It has been pursuing Princess Lynette for quite some time since she wanted Grindon destroyed. Grindon came to the island and attacked the Kells soldiers and the Mystic Knights after it attacked some Temran villages. Upon armoring up, the Mystic Knights' weapons couldn't affect it and it even prevented Rohan from calling Pyre. Torc arrived with his soldiers as Tyrune engaged it in battle. The Mystic Knights used their attacks on Grindon causing it to flee into Kells. It later attacked the castle and was repelled by the Mystic Knights. Lynette warned them that it will return at sunset and if it gets in, the castle will fall. After Princess Lynette left the castle, the Mystic Knights went after her and devised a plan to lure Grindon out into the opening. Finally learning the riddle given to them by King Fin Varra, Rohan has Princess Lynette use his sword and destroy Grindon, which she alone could do (which was why Grindon was pursuing her).
- Evil Eye (40) – Following Rohan being subjected to a potion that fills him with doubt, Queen Maeve summons this laser-shooting, tentacled eye to assist in the attack on Kells. Dierdre and Ivar encountered the Evil Eye and armored up to fight back. Once Rohan regains his confidence, he and Angus help Dierdre and Ivar vanquish the Evil Eye.
- Giant Panther (43) – A large saber-tooth black panther who assisted the Temran army in its fight against the Kells army. It was easily defeated by the Mystic Knights.
- Griffin (43) – To test Lugad to see if he's ready, Queen Maeve summoned three griffins to do battle with him. Lugad manages to defeat them in combat.
- Shadow Monster (48) – Queen Maeve summoned this shadowy monster to assume the form of Lugad in her attack on Kells. Dierdre, Rohan, and Garrett managed to see through its disguise and armored up. They drove the Shadow Monster out of Kells as Angus and Ivar show up. They combined their attacks and destroyed the Shadow Monster.

== Episodes ==
No.	Title	Directed by	Written by	Original release date
1	"Legend of the Ancient Scroll"	Robert Hughes	Joel Barkow & Louis Zivot	September 12, 1998
When her plans for war on Kells are revealed, Maeve begins to raise a monster to battle Kells troops. Told of the ancient scroll which can find Draganta, Rohan and Angus are on the trail, meeting with Ivar along the way. Deirdre follows as the four fall through a portal in the earth.
2	"Tir Na Nóg"	Robert Hughes	Joel Barkow & Louis Zivot	September 16, 1998
In the fairy kingdom, the Knights are put through a series of tests to find their worth. Once they prove themselves, they are granted the Mystic Weapons which they use to fight back a Temra attack.
3	"The Fire Dragon of Dare"	Robert Hughes	Joel Barkow & Louis Zivot	September 17, 1998
The Knights fail to tame Pyre the fire dragon and realize they need their armor to do so. Rohan is first, defeating the Ice Lord of Temra to gain his armor and then assisting the others in fighting a juggernaut.
4	"Tash Hound of Temra"	Greg Wheeler	Mark O’Brian	September 18, 1998
Deirde faces the Lightning Bat of Temra for her suit of armor. Meanwhile, Maeve tricks Rohan into thinking that Temra wants peace with Kells so that she can sic the Tash Hound of Temra on him.
5	"Ivar and the Sea Serpent"	Greg Wheeler	Dan Davis & John O’Donnell	September 19, 1998
Ivar battles the Sea Serpent of Temra for his armor and his feelings about being in Kells. Meanwhile, the others protect a village from a Cyclops.
6	"The Wolf in the Rocks"	Jeremiah Cullinane	Heather McCahon	September 23, 1998
Maeve has her soldiers kidnap Angus to keep him from facing the Rock Wolf of Temra. When his friends rescue him, Angus confronts the Rock Wolf while the others fight the Bull of Temra.
7	"The Taming of Pyre"	Jeremiah Cullinane	Joel Barkow & Louis Zivot	September 24, 1998
8	"The Taming of Pyre"	Jeremiah Cullinane	Joel Barkow & Louis Zivot	September 25, 1998
The Knights try to get Pyre on their side. The Knights manage to control Pyre to become an ally.
9	"Draganta"	Gabe Torres	Maggie Hayes	September 26, 1998
Pyre reveals that Rohan himself is Draganta, which he is uneasy about. Maeve takes advantage to cast a spell that turns the other Knights against each other.
10	"War of the Little People"	Gabe Torres	Joel Barkow & Louis Zivot	September 30, 1998
Mider tricks the Knights into giving up their weapons as he takes over Tir Na Nog.
11	"Dragon's Fury"	Gabe Torres	Harry Caul	October 1, 1998
Maeve uses a plant to control Pyre, forcing the Knights to fight him.
12	"Tyrune"	Kevin Barker	Joel Barkow & Louis Zivot	October 2, 1998
Maeve and Torc trick Rohan into reciting an incantation and bring the ancient dragon Tyrune to life.
13	"Tyrune Returns"	Kevin Barker	Joel Barkow & Louis Zivot	October 3, 1998
The Knights must free Pyre in order to defeat Tyrune.
14	"Aideen and the Stone Princess"	Kevin Barker	Robert Baird & Kelly Senecal	October 6, 1998
Taking what she thinks is a potion to boost her strength, Aideen turns Deirde into stone and must undo the spell.
15	"Battle of the Druids"	Tim Conrad	Joel Barkow & Louis Zivot	October 9, 1998
Cathbad's druid teacher Seethchenn comes to Kells and seems to help the king making Cathbad feel unneeded. However, when it's discovered the druid is working for Maeve, Cathbad must overcome his doubts and fight his mentor.
16	"Queen Deirdre"	Tim Conrad	Joel Barkow & Louis Zivot	October 17, 1998
When Conchobar is taken ill by a spell in the form of a gift, Deirdre must become Queen in his stead. However, her worry about making the wrong choices pushes her to accept a challenge from Maeve that could spell disaster.
17	"Night of the Spirits"	Gabe Torres	Joel Barkow & Louis Zivot	October 31, 1998
Maeve takes advantage of a Kells holiday to send ghostly creatures to attack.
18	"Aideen's Choice"	Tim Conrad	Lyle Weldon	November 5, 1998
Aideen accepts a spell from Maeve that turns her into a human so she can pursue Rohan. Maeve uses the opportunity to capture Deirdre, forcing Aideen to choose the princess or her new form.
19	"Divide & Conquer"	Gabe Torres	Margo McCahon	November 6, 1998
A messenger from Ivar's home requests his return as news comes of a new Temra attack. Both are part of a plan by Maeve to separate the Knights while she uses sleeping fog to take over Kells.
20	"Eye of the Beholder"	Gabe Torres	Maggie Hayes	November 7, 1998
On an errand for Cathbad, Deirde drinks from a magic pool that turns her into a hag. When she goes to Fin Varra for help, he's taken by her new appearance and shrinks her down to be with him.
21	"Garrett and the Princess"	Kevin Barker	Joel Barkow & Louis Zivot	November 11, 1998
In order to forge an alliance, Conchobar agrees to marry Deirde to Garrett, a prince of another land. His arrogance soon rubs all the Knights the wrong way and they tell him to leave.
22	"The Traitor of Kells"	Kevin Barker	Joel Barkow & Louis Zivot	November 12, 1998
Maeve uses a spell on Garrett to turn him into her fighter. He soon manages to defeat the Knights and steal their weapons.
23	"The Fifth Knight"	Kevin Barker	Lyle Weldon	November 13, 1998
Told that Garrett is important to the future of Kells, the Knights manage to free him from his spell.
24	"The Mystic Knight of Forest"	Tim Conrad	Joel Barkow & Louis Zivot	November 14, 1998
Garrett must overcome his arrogance in order to become the new Mystic Knight when he fights a giant spider in Banshee Woods. While Garrett is tangling with the giant spider, Mider summons four of the Spectres of the Banshee Woods to fight the other Knights.
25	"Egg of the Dragon"	Tim Conrad	Joel Barkow & Louis Zivot	November 17, 1998
The Knights discover a dragon's egg in the forest and must keep it from Maeve. Meanwhile, Angus falls in with some old thief friends of his, and Deirde and Garrett attempt to work out their relationship.
26	"The Drageen"	Tim Conrad	Joel Barkow & Louis Zivot	November 19, 1998
Now hatched, the baby dragon is sought by both the Knights and Maeve.
27	"A King's Ransom"	Robert Hughes	Harry Caul	November 20, 1998
When the Northmen, a race of savage invaders, kidnap Conchobar and threaten the whole island, the Knights offer a truce to Maeve to fight them off. However, the invasion is all a ruse of Maeve's to take over Kells.
28	"The Curse of Kells"	Kevin Barker	Joel Barkow & Louis Zivot	January 30, 1999
Ivar is told the story of how Angus and Rohan became friends as children as well as how Torc joined with Maeve.
29	"The Trial of Angus"	Robert Hughes	Joel Barkow & Louis Zivot	February 4, 1999
Rohan and Deirdre work to clear Angus when he's accused of robbing villagers and vandalizing their properties. While Ivar is busy looking for the real culprit, Maeve summons a fire monster and sends it to Kells.
30	"Mider: King of Temra"	Tim Conrad	Joel Barkow & Louis Zivot	February 5, 1999
Tricking Cathbad into turning him human-sized, Mider overthrows Maeve and becomes ruler of Temra. Realizing the power-mad fairy is a more dangerous threat, the Knights aid Maeve in taking back her throne as the answer to King Fin Varra's advice.
31	"The Buckler of Bre"	Kevin Barker	Joel Barkow & Louis Zivot	February 6, 1999
Entering Tir Na Nog, Torc steals a powerful weapon that allows him to challenge the Knights.
32	"Ivar's Revenge"	Kevin Barker	Joel Barkow & Louis Zivot	February 8, 1999
Ivar finally manages to steal back his people's chalice from Torc. However, the chalice is Mider's link to the dark realms and taking it back to Ivar's kingdom is too dangerous. Ivar decides to take the chalice anyway but is captured by Maeve while Mider is left stranded at Castle Kells.
33	"King's Bride"	Kevin Barker	Richard Preston Jr.	February 9, 1999
Conchobar is taken by a visiting lady (Fionna), but Deirdre senses something wrong about her.
34	"All Kings Great and Small"	Tim Conrad	Bob Allen	February 10, 1999
In order to stop a storm of dark magic, the kings of Kells and Tir Na Nog must switch places for a day. While Conchobar organizes the fairies into a fighting force, Fin Varra's more fun ways with the Kells soldiers leave them vulnerable to attack.
35	"The Wish"	Kevin Barker	Dan Davis	February 11, 1999
After saving a wood elf, Angus is offered one wish and the other Knights pressure him to use it for their own desires.
36	"The Lost King"	Tim Conrad	Joel Barkow & Louis Zivot	February 12, 1999
The Knights must find the kidnapped Fin Varra before Maeve steals his powers.
37	"Friends for Life"	Kevin Barker	Maggie Hayes	February 13, 1999
Jealousy of Rohan's prominence leads Angus to a falling out with his friend.
38	"The Prisoner Prince"	Tim Conrad	Joel Barkow & Louis Zivot	February 20, 1999
A young prince who seeks to have his kingdom ally with Temra comes to claim it and the Knights must keep him safe, despite his bratty attitude.
39	"Shipwrecked"	Robert Hughes	Maggie Hayes	February 24, 1999
A beautiful princess named Lynette is found on the shores of Kells without her memory by Fin Varra's scouts. Garrett grows closer to her while her arrival coincides with the monstrous Grindon attacking.
40	"Rohan's Doubt"	Tim Conrad	Joel Barkow & Louis Zivot	February 26, 1999
Maeve casts a spell on Rohan that makes him doubt in his abilities and weakens him in battle.
41	"The Barrow of Balin"	Tim Conrad	Richard Preston Jr.	March 2, 1999
Maeve resurrects the legendary warrior Balin and sets him against Kells, forcing Rohan to battle his idol.
42	"Dark Rider"	Tim Conrad	Richard Preston Jr.	April 23, 1999
Maeve awakens an ancient warrior who uses a scepter to take over the minds of Kells soldiers and the Knights.
43	"The Warrior of Temra"	Kevin Barker	Richard Preston Jr.	April 26, 1999
As the war turns against her, Maeve pulls out her secret weapon that was bred by her teacher Nemain: Lugad, a monstrous warrior.
44	"Battle Fury"	Kevin Barker	Joel Barkow & Louis Zivot	April 27, 1999
Lugad helps turn the tide of war for Temra as the Knights must figure a way to stop him. Rohan undergoes a dangerous test to gain the powerful Battle Fury armor.
45	"Lugad's Challenge"	Kevin Barker	Joel Barkow	April 28, 1999
Rohan faces Lugad one on one and makes a stunning discovery that links them together.
46	"The Mark of Destiny"	Tim Conrad	Maggie Hayes	April 29, 1999
Rohan must try to convince Lugad of the truth about them.
47	"The Queen Mother"	Tim Conrad	Lyle Weldon	April 30, 1999
Captured by Maeve, Rohan is shocked to learn the secret of his origins.
48	"Knight in the Forest"	Declan Recks	Richard Preston Jr.	May 5, 1999
Contemplating leaving Kells, Rohan decides to stay and fight as Garrett returns to aid in the battle.
49	"The Final Battle"	Declan Recks	Joel Barkow & Louis Zivot	May 6, 1999
Maeve launches a full on attack on Castle Kells that forces the Knights and Conchobar to retreat.
50	"Banished"	Declan Recks	Joel Barkow & Louis Zivot	May 7, 1999
Rohan must embrace his destiny to defeat Maeve once and for all.

== Cast ==
- Lochlann Ó Mearáin as Rohan / Mystic Knight of Fire (Battle Fury)
- Lisa Dwan as Deirdre / Mystic Knight of Air
- Justin Pierre as Ivar / Mystic Knight of Water
- Vincent Walsh as Angus / Mystic Knight of Earth
- Stephen Brennan as King Conchobar
- Barry Cassin as Cathbad
- Charlotte Bradley as Queen Maeve
- Gerry O'Brien as Torc
- Peadar Lamb as Fin Varra
- Ned Dennehy as Mider
- Kelly Campbell as Aideen
- Ben Palmer as Garrett / Mystic Knight of Forest (Eps 21–27, 39, 48–50)
- Eric O'Cuinn as Lugad

=== Voice actors ===
- Ned Dennehy as The Lightning Bat of Temra, The Rock Wolf of Temra
- Shaun Elebert as The Ice Lord of Temra
- Enda Kilroy as The Sea Serpent of Temra

== Development ==
A second season entitled Mystic Knights: Battle Thunder was planned, but later cancelled, and its budget put towards Power Rangers Lost Galaxy and the English dub version of Digimon: Digital Monsters. This was due to Power Rangers in Space having strong ratings.

== Home media ==
In the US and UK, only one VHS was released. In Germany, two DVDs were released with two episodes each. The original English audio is not included on the DVDs.

== See also ==
- The Ulster Cycle – the Irish legends concerning the actual Conchobar, Cathbad, Deirdre, and Maeve.
