= Joyride (2022 film) =

2022 film by Emer Reynolds

- Theatrical release poster
- Directed by: Emer Reynolds
- Written by: Ailbhe Keogan
- Produced by: Tristan Orpen Lynch; Aoife O'Sullivan
- Starring: Olivia Colman; Charlie Reid; Lochlann Ó Mearáin
- Cinematography: James Mather
- Edited by: Tony Cranstoun
- Music by: Ray Harman
- Production companies: Subotica Entertainment; Embankment Films; Screen Ireland; Ingenious Media
- Distributed by: Vertigo Films
- Release dates: 5 July 2022 (Galway); 29 July 2022 (United Kingdom)
- Running time: 94 minutes
- Countries: Ireland; United Kingdom
- Language: English
- Box office: $87,556

Joyride is a 2022 coming-of-age drama film directed by Emer Reynolds from a screenplay by Ailbhe Keogan. It had its world premiere at the Galway Film Fleadh on 5 July 2022 and was released theatrically on 29 July 2022 by Vertigo Films.

== Plot ==
Twelve-year-old Mully lives with his indebted father, James, in County Kerry, Ireland, after Mully’s mother Rita dies of cancer. At a charity event held in Rita’s honour, Mully realises James has stolen the donated hospice money to pay off debts. Mully grabs the cash and flees in an unattended taxi.

He is startled to find two passengers in the back: Joy, a middle-aged woman who is drunk and distressed, and her newborn baby. When the baby cries, Joy panics, but Mully manages to calm the child. To avoid attention, Mully abandons the taxi and takes another car from a used-car lot, insisting on driving despite being underage and unlicensed. They stick to back roads to reduce the risk of being stopped, quarrelling at first but gradually bonding.

After the car runs out of fuel, they walk to a petrol station and pass the time by taking turns asking questions. Mully admits he has the hospice money; Joy reveals she plans to leave the baby with her childhood friend Mags and fly to Lanzarote, saying she feels detached from the child and does not know who the father is. James contacts Mully and urges him to head for a ferry. Joy initially refuses, but after a tense encounter at a police checkpoint she agrees, and they switch vehicles again to stay ahead of the search.

While waiting for the ferry, Mully helps Joy figure out breastfeeding, drawing on what he remembers from caring for a younger sibling. Joy names the baby Robin after seeing a robin nearby, and tells Mully she went to school with Rita, describing Rita as admired and popular. James catches up with them, and Mully persuades him to let Joy and Robin travel with them. When Joy suffers a haemorrhage, they stop at a bed-and-breakfast so she can recover. James schemes to protect himself, pressuring Mully to tell locals that he stole the money but was later robbed.

Joy calls Mags, saying the baby arrived a week early, that she has named her Robin, and that she has breastfed her. She also confides a troubling childhood memory: after she and her mother saw her father cheating, Joy went into the sea and was caught in an undertow, and she remembers her mother hesitating before helping her.

The next morning Joy returns the hospice money to Mully so he can repay it. Hurt that Joy still intends to give up Robin, Mully lashes out at her. In a state of emotional turmoil, Joy leaves Robin at Mags’s house and drives to Kerry airport to go through with her plan. On the plane to Spain, Joy panics and insists on being let off, then races back to find Mully.

James confronts them and demands the money. Joy tries to protect Mully, but Mully runs into the sea and throws the cash behind him. James retrieves it while Joy pulls Mully back to safety. In the aftermath, Mags calls Joy to say Robin is distraught. Joy drives with Mully to return the stolen hospice money, and they go to collect Robin.

== Cast ==
- Olivia Colman as Joy
  - Kate Brick as young Joy
- Charlie Reid as Andrew "Mully" Mulligan
  - Seamus Kennedy as young Mully
- Lochlann Ó Mearáin as James Mulligan
- Elaine Kennedy as Rita Mulligan
- Olwen Fouéré as Sideline Sue
- Aislín McGuckin as Angela
- Florence Adebambo as Catherine
- Tommy Tiernan as Ferryman
- Ruth McCabe as Noreen
- Aisling O'Sullivan as Mags

== Production ==
In November 2020, it was reported that Olivia Colman would star in Joyride, which would be directed by Emer Reynolds from a script by Ailbhe Keogan. In June 2021, Charlie Reid was cast in the film after a casting search involving "1,500 applicants". As of 17 July 2021, Colman was spotted shooting scenes for the film in County Kerry, Ireland.

== Release ==
In June 2021, Vertigo Releasing acquired U.K. and Irish rights to the film. It had its world premiere at the Galway Film Fleadh on 5 July 2022. It was released on 29 July 2022. Magnolia Pictures announced that they acquired the U.S. distribution rights and will release the film in U.S. theaters and on demand 23 December 2022.

== Reception ==
On Rotten Tomatoes the film has a 50% rating based on 42 reviews, with an average rating of 5.5/10. The critics consensus reads: "Olivia Colman's performance is enough to carry Joyride over a few miles of credulity-straining incident, but this rickety road trip runs out of fuel long before it reaches its final destination." On Metacritic, the film holds a weighted average score of 48 out of 100, based on 13 critics, indicating "mixed or average reviews".
