= Jack Hickey (actor) =

Irish actor

Jack Hickey is an Irish television and film actor and director.

== Career ==
In 2017, he joined the cast of Emmerdale, as Matt, the father of Carly's (Gemma Atkinson) child. As an actor, Hickey also made appearances in Game Of Thrones, Penny Dreadful and Jericho. He also appeared in the feature films Mary Shelley and Sea Fever alongside Hermione Corfield. His directorial debut film Cynthia won awards at the Galway Film Fleadh and the Irish Film Festival in London. It was also long-listed for the 92nd Academy Awards. The film was made by his production company Cooper Alley Productions he runs with his sister Lara Hickey.

In 2022, he joined the cast of Netflix series Vikings: Valhalla as Richard II, Duke of Normandy.

He had a role in the 2024 police procedural drama Borderline. In August 2024, he joined the cast of the sports film Saipan as Niall Quinn, appearing alongside Steve Coogan.

== Partial filmography ==
Year	Title	Role	Notes
2015	Game of Thrones	Young Braavosi	1 episode
2015-2016	Penny Dreadful	Junior Inspector	11 episodes
2016	Jericho	Rory	2 episodes
2017	Emmerdale	Matt	10 episodes
2017	Mary Shelley	Thomas Hogg	Film
2019	Sea Fever	Johnny	Film
2019	Cynthia		Director
2023	Harry Wild	Finn Kinsella	1 episode
2022-	Vikings: Valhalla	Richard II, Duke of Normandy	Recurring role
2024	Borderline	Sean	
2025	Saipan	Niall Quinn	
