= Peadar Lamb =

Irish actor (1929–2017)

- Born: 24 December 1929; Galway, Ireland
- Died: 1 September 2017 (aged 87); County Dublin, Ireland
- Education: Abbey School of Acting
- Occupation: Actor
- Years active: 1954–2015
- Notable work: Mystic Knights of Tir Na Nog, Jakers! The Adventures of Piggley Winks
- Spouse: Geraldine Plunkett (m. 1965)
- Children: 7

Peadar Lamb (24 December 1929 – 1 September 2017) was an Irish actor. He was known for his roles in numerous Irish-language stage productions, including playing King Fin Varra in the television series Mystic Knights of Tir Na Nog, and voicing Grandpa Piggley Winks on the children's television series Jakers! The Adventures of Piggley Winks.

== Early life ==
Lamb grew up in An Cheathrú Rua, Carraroe. His father, Charles Lamb, was a well-known painter. Peadar Lamb trained at the Abbey Theatre and first appeared on stage in 1954.

== Career ==
=== Theatre ===
Lamb had a theatrical career lasting over 60 years. Over the course of this time, he played diverse characters and appeared in a number of plays by famous playwrights including Brendan Behan, Dion Boucicault and Seán O'Casey:

- Estragon in Samuel Beckett's Waiting for Godot
- Dunlavin and Warder Regan in The Quare Fellow (Behan's first play)
- Monsewer in The Hostage and An Giall
- Police informer Harvey Duff in The Shaughraun
- Myles na Coppaleen in The Colleen Bawn
- Brennan o' the Moor in Red Roses For Me
- Mr. Gallogher in The Shadow of a Gunman

Other stage performances include a role as Curly in John Murphy's The Country Boy and as the blind man in W. B. Yeats' On Baile's Strand. Lamb toured America and Canada in 1990 with John Millington Synge's The Playboy of the Western World. In June 2002, Peadar Lamb and his wife Geraldine Plunkett played leading roles in a production of Tony Guerin's play Hummin', performed by the Waterford-based Red Kettle Company.

=== Television ===
Lamb appeared on many series broadcasts on RTÉ One, including television soap operas Fair City and Ros na Rún. He appeared in a 1998 episode of the sitcom Father Ted and played Mr. Hasson in the British drama film The Railway Station Man, opposite Donald Sutherland and Julie Christie. He also played fairy King Fin Varra in the television series Mystic Knights of Tir Na Nog, loosely based on Irish mythology and voiced Old Piggley Winks on the children's television series Jakers! The Adventures of Piggley Winks.

=== Teaching ===
Lamb qualified as a primary school teacher before becoming an actor full time and later taught young actors at his alma mater, Abbey School of Acting.

== Personal life ==
Lamb was married to actress Geraldine Plunkett from 1965. They had seven children.

Lamb died in his sleep at his home in Glenageary, Ireland, on 1 September 2017, at the age of 87.

== Filmography ==
Film
Year	Title	Role	Notes
2007	Cré na Cille	An Máistir Mór	
2006	Secret of the Cave	Corky	
2004	Man About Dog	Fitzgerald the Farmer	
2003	Bloom	Editor	
1998	This Is My Father	Man in Pub	
1994	The Bishop's Story	Bishop	
1992	Far and Away	Farmer	
1992	The Railway Station Man	Mr. Hasson	
1991	December Bride	Registrar	
1990	The Field	Paddy Joe O'Reilly	
1987	Budawanny	Bishop	
1984	Reflections	Doctor	
1971	Von Richthofen and Brown	German staff Major	
1967	Jules Verne's Rocket to the Moon	Soldier	
1965	The Secret of My Success	Superintendent Henderson	
1959	This Other Eden	Young Devereaux	

Television
Year	Title	Role	Notes
2015	No Offence, episode #1.7'	Errol Lang	final role
2003–2007	Jakers! The Adventures of Piggley Winks	Grandpa Piggley Winks (voice)	
2004	Killinaskully, episode The New Priest	Fr. Mullarkey	
2002	Bobbie's Girl	Priest	
2001	Custer's Last Stand-up, episode Play It Again, Gem	Gem Diamond	
2000	My Hero	Seamus Sunday	Series 1 Episode 5 "Old Man Riverdance"
1998–1999	Mystic Knights of Tir Na Nog	Fin Varra	
1998	Father Ted	Fargo Boyle	Series 3 Episode 2 Chirpy Burpy Cheap Sheep
1996	Ros na Rún	P.J. Doherty	
1996	Screen Two (drama series), episode Loving	Eldon	
1991	The Treaty	Sir John Lavery	
1990	Shoot to Kill	Mr. Tighe	
1989	Brotherhood of the Rose	Doctor	
