= Barry Cassin =

Irish television actor (1924–2017)

- Born: John Finbar Cassin; 23 November 1924
- Died: 14 January 2017 (aged 92)
- Occupations: Television, stage and screen actor
- Known for: His role in the production of Twelve Angry Men
- Notable work: Mystic Knights of Tir Na Nog, Byzantium, The Field

John Finbar Cassin (23 November 1924 – 14 January 2017), known professionally as Barry Cassin, was an Irish television, stage and screen actor. On stage, he is best known for his role in the production of Twelve Angry Men.

On screen, Cassin played mostly secondary roles such as in the television series Mystic Knights of Tir Na Nog, in 2004 he was Fr. Griffin in The Blackwater Lightship for the Hallmark Hall of Fame and the 2012 film Byzantium. He introduced the works of John B. Keane and notably directed the first stage production of The Field. Cassin's daughter, Anne, is a well-known journalist and news presenter for Raidió Teilifís Éireann.

== Filmography ==
Year	Title	Role	Notes
1967	Ulysses		
1970	The McKenzie Break	Guard Jones	Uncredited
1980	The Sleep of Death	The Count's Brother	
1993	Fatal Inheritance	Dr. Fitzsimmon	
1996	Some Mother's Son	Prosecutor	
1996	Snakes and Ladders	Mr. Duffy	
2000	When Brendan Met Trudy	Headmaster	
2002	The Count of Monte Cristo	Old Man Dantes	
2002	The Escapist	Judge	
2012	Byzantium	Robert Fowlds	(final film role)
