= Blackshore =

Irish television series

- Genre: Crime drama
- Screenplay by: Kate O'Riordan
- Directed by: Dathaí Keane
- Starring: Lisa Dwan; Rory Keenan; Jade Jordan; Amy De Bhrún
- Country of origin: Ireland
- Original language: English
- No. of series: 1
- No. of episodes: 6

Production
- Executive producers: Andrew Morrissey; Michael Parke; Kate O'Riordan; Dathaí Keane; Dermot Horan; Andrew Byrne; David Crean
- Producers: Rebecca O'Flanagan; Robert Walpole
- Production company: Treasure Entertainment

Original release
- Network: RTÉ One
- Release: 4 February – 10 March 2024

Blackshore is a 2024 Irish crime drama series directed by Dathaí Keane, starring Lisa Dwan and Rory Keenan. It was broadcast on RTÉ One from 4 February 2024.

== Premise ==
A Dublin detective, Fia, is sent to a rural backwater close to her hometown in the west of Ireland. She must investigate the disappearance of a woman (later, two women) against the backdrop of a similar case many years ago that ended with Fia's father murdering the rest of Fia's family.

== Cast and characters ==
- Lisa Dwan as DI Fia Lucey
- Rory Keenan as Cian Furlong
- Jade Jordan as Donna Walsh
- Amy De Bhrún as Niamh Furlong
- Stanley Townsend as Bill McGuire
- Andrew Bennett as Donal Riley
- Aidan McArdle as Charlie Reid
- Barry McGovern as Dr. Whelan
- Dara Devaney as Liam McArdle

== Production ==
The series is written by Kate O'Riordan and directed by Dathaí Keane. It is produced by Treasure Entertainment. Producer of the series is Rebecca O'Flanagan.

The cast is led by Lisa Dwan and Rory Keenan and also includes Jade Jordan, Stanley Townsend, Andrew Bennett and Amy De Bhrún.

Filming locations included Killaloe, County Clare and Ballina, County Tipperary.

== Broadcast ==
The series debuted on RTÉ One on 4 February 2024. The series was shown on UKTV from 19 October 2024.

== Reception ==
Ben Dowell in The Times praised the chemistry between Dwan and Keenan and also praised the "lively script". Phil Harrison in The Guardian said it was "not groundbreaking" but described Dwan as a "spirited lead, making her character Lucey easy to root for". Pat Stacey in Irish Independent described Dwan as "the sarkiest, narkiest, angriest detective in television crime drama". Ed Power in The Irish Times described it as a "Silly, watchable drama" but "one of the better thrillers from RTÉ".

John Brennan, Mark Henry, and Fionan Higgins were nominated for Best Sound at the Irish Film and Television Awards in January 2025.
