= Jakers! The Adventures of Piggley Winks =

Irish animated children's television series

- Genre: Children's television series
- Created by: Denise Fitzpatrick; Mike Young; Liz Young; Sindy McKay; John Over
- Developed by: Mike Young; Liz Young; Sindy McKay; John Over (season 3)
- Directed by: John Over (seasons 1–2); Jeff Gordon (season 3); Kelly Ward (voice)
- Voices of: Peadar Lamb; Maile Flanagan; Russi Taylor; Tara Strong; Charlie Adler; Nika Futterman; Melissa Disney; Pamela Adlon; Mel Brooks; Joan Rivers
- Theme music composer: Geoff Levin; Harriet Schock
- Opening theme: "Jakers! Theme"
- Ending theme: "Jakers! Theme" (instrumental)
- Composers: Stephen C. Marston; Michael Tavera
- Countries of origin: United Kingdom; United States; Ireland; India
- Original language: English
- No. of seasons: 3
- No. of episodes: 52

Production
- Executive producers: Mike Young (seasons 1–2); Stephanie Gougeon (seasons 1–2); Louisa Stretton (seasons 1–2); Liz Young (season 3); Bill Schultz (season 3); Daniel Isman (season 3)
- Producer: John Over
- Running time: 23 minutes 30 minutes (original PBS broadcast)
- Production companies: Entara Ltd.; Mike Young Productions; Crest Communications

Original release
- Network: PBS Kids (US); CBBC and CBeebies (UK); RTE Two (Ireland)
- Release: September 7, 2003 – January 23, 2007

Jakers! The Adventures of Piggley Winks, or simply Jakers in Europe, is an animated children's television series created and developed by Mike Young, Liz Young, Sindy McKay-Swerdlove and John Over based on an original idea by Denise Fitzpatrick and produced by Entara in association with Mike Young Productions with the animation provided by Crest Communications. The series was broadcast on PBS Kids in the United States, and on CBBC and CBeebies in the United Kingdom. It was also broadcast in Australia on ABC Kids. The series aired for three seasons and 52 episodes total from September 7, 2003, to January 23, 2007, with reruns airing through August 31, 2008. Reruns aired on the Qubo television network from June 30, 2012, to March 26, 2017.

The show chronicles the boyhood adventures of Piggley Winks, an anthropomorphic pig from Ireland, and how he relates these stories to his grandchildren as a grandfather in the modern day. Many of the stories takes place on the Winks family's farm, Raloo Farm, located in the village of Tara. Piggley and his father use the word “Jakers” to express their delight when they discover something on their adventures. Notably, the show contains voiceover work by the actors Joan Rivers and Mel Brooks.

== Premise ==
Jakers! takes place in two different settings, in two different time periods.

In the present time (the frame story), Piggley Winks (Peadar Lamb, Maile Flanagan as a young boy) lives in the United States and tells stories of his childhood in rural Ireland to his three grandchildren (Nika Futterman and Melissa Disney). In flashbacks, he is seen as a child, playing and adventuring with his friends such as Fernando “Ferny” Toro the bull (Russi Taylor) and Dannan O’Mallard (Tara Strong) and going to school in the early 1950s. Most of the main characters are anthropomorphic animals—including Piggley and his family, who are all pigs. However, there are normal, non-anthropomorphic animals in the show as well.

=== Past ===
Piggley Winks lived with his parents Pádraig and Elly and his younger sister Molly at Raloo Farm in Ireland. His best friends are Dannan O'Mallard, a duck who lives in a hut by a pond with her rarely seen grandmother, and Fernando "Ferny" Toro, a young bull who lives with his widowed father, the Spanish blacksmith Don Toro in the village of Tara. Piggley's rival is the main antagonist, Hector McBadger.

Piggley lives on a farm as a normal child, going to school, helping his parents, taking care of his sister, and having adventures, often accompanied by his friends. His interest in stories and legends, and his mischievous streak, lead him into unpredictable situations, such as believing fairies turned Ferny into a bug, trying to hatch a supposed dragon's egg, using the Salmon of Knowledge to pass the school exam, and even trying to capture the legendary Fir Darrig.

Each story also features a subplot featuring a sheep named Wiley (voiced by Mel Brooks), who lives at Raloo Farm with his flock. As the only sheep in the flock who can talk, he believes he is their natural leader, and tries to get the other sheep to do all kinds of different things (singing, racing, playing sports, acting, etc.), with varying degrees of success. He is later assisted by his mate, a female sheep named Shirley (voiced by Joan Rivers).

A running gag on the show is that Wiley's subplot and Piggley's plot would collide (e.g. in "Sheep on the Loose", Wiley runs away and Piggley, as the shepherd, tries to find him).

CommonSenseMedia explains that at the end of each episode there is a live-action segment, in which "group of children talk about their own experiences and feelings, reflecting on what the episode has been about".

=== Present ===
An elderly Piggley lives with his daughter Ciara and her three children, the twins Seán and Séamus, and their older sister Meg. Whenever the children have an issue, Piggley tells them one of his childhood stories as a moral lesson. The grandchildren are able to identify potential exaggerations in his stories.

== Development ==
Jakers! was originally conceived by Denise Fitzpatrick based on her experiences on a farm as a young girl in rural Ireland. The original name for her character and the show she planned to adapt him to was originally titled Piggley Pooh, which caused a cease and desist letter by The Walt Disney Company due to the planned show sharing the same name as the Winnie the Pooh series. Despite countersuing and having the European Court side with the Fitzpatrick's, their lawyer decided that changing the name of the show and character would be better to avoid future intellectual property issues. Eventually, this led to Piggley Pooh becoming Piggley Winks.

The term Jakers derives from the Irish interjection "Jaysus", which in turn derives from Jesus.

After the name change, production on the show began in March 2002, under the title of The Curley Tales of Piggley Winks. Denise's husband, Frances, helped produce the show through his company, Entara, while the show was executively produced by Mike Young and animated by his studio Mike Young Productions, which at the time was handling international distribution for the series. Notably, the show was rendered in high definition, being the first cartoon to do so at the time. The majority of the cast recorded their voices at Salami Studios in North Hollywood, California while Peadar Lamb, Frank McCourt, Fionnula Flanagan, David Kelly, and Brendan Gleeson recorded from Slate in Dublin, Ireland. The animation was outsourced to Crest Animation Studios in Mumbai, India.

== Broadcast ==
Jakers! The Adventures of Piggley Winks was shown on CBeebies and CBBC in United Kingdom from 2004 up until early 2011. It first aired in the United Kingdom on the CBBC Channel on September 6, 2004, as part of the short lived Animadness block, and later was repeated on CBeebies from February 13, 2006, on the BBC One strand at 3:25pm, but it did not air on the CBeebies Channel until March 19, 2007, when the scheduling of CBeebies was changing, and Qubo, and PBS Kids, and PBS Kids Sprout in United States.

9 Story Media Group distributes the series.

Reruns on PBS Kids continued to air until August 31, 2008, and PBS Kids Sprout aired this series in 2005, where it was made available on Sprout on Demand with selected episodes airing under the "Children's Favorites" label (and eventually in its own label). It joined the network a year later in 2006, during a Grandparents' Day marathon, but was taken off two years later on July 3, 2008.

Univision's Planeta U carried the show as part of the block's inaugural lineup from its launch on April 5, 2008, to August 28, 2010.

== Episodes ==
=== Series overview ===
| Season | Episodes | Originally released | |
| Season | Episodes | First released | Last released |
|---|---|---|---|
| 1 | 27 | September 7, 2003 | June 27, 2004 |
| 2 | 14 | September 5, 2004 | January 30, 2005 |
| 3 | 12 | September 18, 2006 | January 23, 2007 |

=== Season 1 (2003–04) ===
| No. overall | No. in season | Title | Original release date |
|---|---|---|---|
| 1 | 1 | "Pie Filling" | September 7, 2003 |
Unable to wait for supper, Piggley, Ferny, Dannan, and Molly all eat Mrs. Wink's apple pie; but soon, they fear that she's going to get upset, so they try to make a new pie before she finds out.
| 2 | 2 | "Salmon of Knowledge" | September 14, 2003 |
Not wanting to study, Piggley seeks a magic fish to help him with an exam.
| 3 | 3 | "Ferny is a Bug" | September 21, 2003 |
Piggley and Dannan believe that fairies have turned Ferny into a beetle that they encounter.
| 4 | 4 | "The Case of Big Sty" | September 28, 2003 |
Piggley's favorite radio program, 'Piggley Trotter, Private Eye', inspires Piggley and Ferny to spend many imaginative and adventurous afternoons playing detective.
| 5 | 5 | "All Night Long" | October 12, 2003 |
Piggley, along with his friends Ferny and Dannan, wants to prove to his father that he is responsible enough to go on a fishing trip.
| 6 | 6 | "Picture Perfect" | October 19, 2003 |
Piggley tries to regain Ferny's trust after an embarrassing photo of Ferny which Piggley took gets loose at school.
| 7 | 7 | "Teacher Creature" | November 2, 2003 |
Piggley is nervous about his teacher coming to his house for dinner.
| 8 | 8 | "Molly's Dolly" | November 9, 2003 |
When Molly finds a leprechaun doll that fell from a passing truck, Piggley thinks that the doll is a real leprechaun.
| 9 | 9 | "Song of the Banshee" | November 16, 2003 |
Piggley and his friends hear a strange spooky noise and think is a screaming banshee.
| 10 | 10 | "Our Dragon's Egg" | December 21, 2003 |
Piggley, Ferny and Dannan find a swan egg, but they think it is a dragon's egg.
| 11 | 11 | "The Cat Came Back...and Back" | December 28, 2003 |
Piggley and his friends try to find Miss Nanny's cat to receive a reward.
| 12 | 12 | "Good Neighbor" | January 4, 2004 |
When a new kid moves into Piggley's neighborhood, Piggley and his friends believe that he is a mad scientist.
| 13 | 13 | "Rock Around the Cluck" | February 22, 2004 |
When Piggley discovers rock and roll, he gets Ferny and Dannan to form a band called "The Raloo Rockers" for a talent show.
| 14 | 14 | "Donkeys Into Racehorses" | February 29, 2004 |
Piggley tries to turn his donkey into a racehorse.
| 15 | 15 | "Fir Not" | March 7, 2004 |
Piggley and his friends try to find a fir darrig, a mischievous kind of leprechaun.
| 16 | 16 | "The Legend of Raloo" | March 14, 2004 |
Mr. Hornsby's tale of ancient Irish battles inspires the kids to act out their own crusade.
| 17 | 17 | "Sheep on the Loose" | March 21, 2004 |
When Piggley is put in charge of the sheep, his overly enthusiastic approach makes the sheep disgruntled; this even causes the lead sheep, Wiley, to run away. Piggley must then use his ingenuity and understanding to bring his sheep home. Through the process, he learns much about how to do a job well and gains new respect from his father.
| 18 | 18 | "Milk Melodrama" | March 28, 2004 |
When Piggley overhears his dad is worried about the farm's poor milk sales, he launches a creative campaign to improve business. Dad is impressed and touched by Piggley's generosity of spirit. Piggley learns what a wonderful experience it is to help others when there is nothing in it for yourself.
| 19 | 19 | "No Girls Allowed" | April 4, 2004 |
Hector forms a club called "The Spooky Storytellers", which Piggley and Ferny join, but when they find out it is a "no girls allowed" club, Piggley and Ferny wonder how Dannan is going to cope with the situation.
| 20 | 20 | "New Best Friends" | April 11, 2004 |
Piggley and his best friends Ferny and Dannan are challenged to open their minds and hearts to new friends when Mr. Hornsby requires them to do a team project with classmates they do not know very well. They end up seeing things in a different light when they take time to look under the surface.
| 21 | 21 | "Treasure Hunt" | April 18, 2004 |
Mr. Winks plants a treasure map for Piggley and his friends, but this is a map with a difference! The trio set about the tasks on the treasure trail and are having so much fun they do not realize they are doing their chores at the same time. But the real "treasure" is learning that when work is done with the right attitude, it can even be fun!
| 22 | 22 | "Throw-Up Gigglers " | May 9, 2004 |
| 23 | 23 | "For Whom the Bell Trolls" | May 16, 2004 |
Hector plays a joke on Piggley, Dannan and Ferny, but they do not think it is so funny. With a little gentle encouragement from Don Toro, Piggley and his pals look at their problem with Hector from a new perspective. They use their ingenuity to show him that "jokes" are not always so funny when the joke is on you!
| 24 | 24 | "A Little Bit of Something Extra! Extra!" | May 23, 2004 |
The kids set out to write newspaper articles, but Piggley and Ferny make up fake stories instead.
| 25 | 25 | "Ferny Gets a Crush" | May 30, 2004 |
Piggley and Dannan think they know best how to help a love-struck Ferny get the attention of his schoolmate, Millie. While he appreciates that his friends are trying to help, in the end Ferny learns that he's really much better off trusting his own feelings and instincts.
| 26 | 26 | "My Right Arm" | June 20, 2004 |
Piggley tries to make the most of a bad situation by training his left arm to throw when his right arm is broken and put in a cast, but it is the help of his friends that enables him to overcome his temporary handicap and win the Ball Toss Contest at the annual School Fair.
| 27 | 27 | "Lucky U" | June 27, 2004 |
Piggley and his friends want to learn the true story behind the horseshoe Mr. Hornsby has on the school's door.

=== Season 2 (2004–05) ===
| No. overall | No. in season | Title | Original release date |
|---|---|---|---|
| 27 | 1 | "Ferny Wears the Star" | September 5, 2004 |
Ferny gets the chance to be the leader in a game of cowboys, and Piggley is put in the unusual position of being a follower. But Ferny doesn't play cowboys Piggley's way and Piggley soon loses interest and goes home. Mr. Winks convinces Piggley to try Ferny's way and Piggley ends up having fun - and gaining new respect for his friend.
| 28 | 2 | "Molly Had a Little Lamb" | September 12, 2004 |
Molly is about to start school and feels very grown up. To prove it, she persuades her parents to let her take care of an adorable lamb. When Molly can't say "no" to the little darling, however, he becomes a troublemaker, causing chaos on the farm, in the house, and even at school. Molly soon realizes that even little lambs need rules!
| 29 | 3 | "Trial and Error" | September 19, 2004 |
When Dannan's school bag is chewed to pieces, she believes Finnegan the donkey to be the likely suspect. The kids hold a "trial" in the barn, where witnesses tell different versions of the crime. When it is revealed that Finnegan was not to blame, everyone learns an important lesson about the dangers of making accusations without knowing all the facts.
| 30 | 4 | "Rain, Rain Go Away" | September 26, 2004 |
When Mr. and Mrs. Winks have to go out in the rain to repair a fence, Piggley must keep Molly inside and entertained. He quickly realizes that what is fun for him isn't necessarily fun for Molly. Piggley uses his ingenuity to come up with some great games they both can play and enjoy - and discovers how much fun it is to be a truly helpful older brother!
| 31 | 5 | "A Touch of Spain" | October 3, 2004 |
Ferny thinks his dad is moving back to Spain, so his friends and the whole town bring Spain to him so he doesn't feel homesick.
| 32 | 6 | "Dannan's American Cousin" | October 10, 2004 |
Dannan is excited when her cousin, Gaddie, comes to visit from the United States. She gets jealous, however, when it appears that Gaddie likes Ferny and Piggley better than she likes Dannan. When Dannan's jealousy gets the best of her and she ruins a fun afternoon, she learns that the best way to deal with bad feelings is to talk about them.
| 33 | 7 | "Waking Thor" | October 31, 2004 |
Ferny is distraught when his pet fish, Thor, dies. Piggley and Dannan try to help Ferny by distracting him with games and play, but Ferny doesn't seem to be getting better. The townsfolk pitch in and hold a wake for Thor to help Ferny talk about, share his feelings and to celebrate the happiness Thor brought him. Meanwhile, Wiley and Bernie play tennis.
| 34 | 8 | "Father's Day" | November 7, 2004 |
Piggley needs to help his father with some chores around the farm. But when Piggley takes a more creative than practical approach in painting the milk cart and builds a castle of hay for the new chicks, his father thinks Piggley is playing instead of working. In the end, Piggley's overworked father sees the joy Piggley is getting from his work and rediscovers his own sense of play.
| 35 | 9 | "Growing Pains" | November 28, 2004 |
After griping about his parents' rules, Piggley wishes he were a grownup, so he could do as he pleases. When Dad sprains his ankle and puts Piggley in charge of the farm for a day, however, Piggley finds being a grownup is a lot harder than it looks.
| 36 | 10 | "Dannan Does a Jig" | December 26, 2004 |
When Dannan's grandma teaches the class to dance, Dannan proves an enthusiastic student of the art. When Dannan realizes that she isn't a very good dancer, however, she becomes afraid that she will let her friends down and doesn't want to dance anymore.
| 37 | 11 | "Searching for a Shamrock" | January 9, 2005 |
Piggley, Ferny, and Dannan misplace Mr. Hornsby's wooden shamrock, and try to retrace their steps to find it.
| 38 | 12 | "Wish Upon a Story" | January 16, 2005 |
| 39 | 13 | "Wish Upon a Story" | January 23, 2005 |
Part 1: Piggley's grandchildren come up with a story for his birthday. Part 2: Uncle Ferny comes to visit and tells Piggley's grandchildren the story of the original Raloo Rocket.
| 40 | 14 | "The Creepy Cabbages of County Galway" | January 30, 2005 |
After being told he's too young to listen to his parents' science fiction radio show, Piggley eavesdrops anyway. When his impressionable imagination puts him in a strange nightmare filled with cabbages and cabbage creatures, he learns why there are reasons for rules.

=== Season 3 (2006–07) ===
| No. overall | No. in season | Title | Original release date |
|---|---|---|---|
| 41 | 1 | "The Haunted Shipwreck" | September 18, 2006 |
When Piggley and friends come upon an old shipwreck which bears the legend of being haunted, they take it upon themselves to free the ghost of Captain White. In doing so, they create a memory - and an adventure story - to last a lifetime.
| 42 | 2 | "The Monkey" | September 19, 2006 |
When a monkey escapes from a traveling circus, Piggley and friends believe they've found an elusive "Irish gorilla". They set out to trap him, and in the process create an adventure of a lifetime.
| 43 | 3 | "Judging a Book" | September 20, 2006 |
When Meg is going to watch a DVD rather than read the book it is based on, Grandpa recalls the first time he ever got a book without pictures. As young Piggley reads the story, he imagines himself as the book's hero, Finn McCoul.
| 44 | 4 | "Return of the Raloo Rockers" | September 21, 2006 |
The Raloo Rockers want to be on TV, so they work really hard to get on the television program, The Buck Boylan Variety Hour.
| 45 | 5 | "How Much is that Dragon?" | September 22, 2006 |
Captain Cumara is going to give Ferny a pet. But what kind? As Ferny, Piggley and Dannan wait for the captain to arrive, they imagine the impossible exotic animals that could be Ferny's new pet.
| 46 | 6 | "Mi Galeon" | September 25, 2006 |
Grandpa Piggley recounts the story of the time he, Dannan and Ferny all built miniature ships and entered the Raloo River Race. Unfortunately, Don Toro lets his enthusiasm get the better of him and he does most of the work building Ferny's entry. The ship is fantastic, but Ferny feels like he did not contribute enough. In the end, Ferny overcomes his fear of hurting his papa's feelings, and by speaking up asserts his right to build his own boat.
| 47 | 7 | "The Gift" | September 26, 2006 |
Piggley wants a new snow sled for his birthday but his father can't afford it. Piggley learns that sometimes the best gifts are those from the heart.
| 48 | 8 | "Tale Spinner" | September 27, 2006 |
When Piggley's substitute teacher assigns them to write a two-page true story - he doesn't take it seriously. After all, storytelling comes easy to him so he can do the work the last minute. But when the substitute teacher turns out to be an inspiration to the class, Piggley learns to value his storytelling gift and to work harder at it.
| 49 | 9 | "Hector's Hero" | January 15, 2007 |
After Dannan saves Hector from a mild mishap, a grateful, but ever-so-obnoxious Hector won't leave her alone, no matter what she says.
| 50 | 10 | "Macarooned" | January 18, 2007 |
Grandpa Piggley recounts the story of the time he, Dannan and Ferny got "lost at sea", and were subsequently stranded on a remote island. With only their wits and ingenuity to aid them, the trio tend to their sea-sick chaperone, Finbarr Hornsby, and contend - Robinson Crusoe-like - with the hostile wilderness until Dad Winks can rescue them.
| 51 | 11 | "Mind Your Manners" | January 19, 2007 |
Dannan is thrilled when the children are invited to a big party hosted by Mr. McGandry for his brother, the Ambassador to Denmark, but Piggley's lack of social graces almost ruins the day.
| 52 | 12 | "The World According to Molly" | January 23, 2007 |
Grown-up Aunt Molly sends Meg drawings she did when she was 5-years-old. These drawings give a different slant to some of Grandpa Piggley's stories; and reveal the strong influence Piggley had on his younger sister.

== Cast ==
=== Main ===
- Peadar Lamb as Grandpa Piggley Winks
- Maile Flanagan as Young Piggley Winks, Fergal O'Hopper (except in "Good Neighbor" and "New Best Friends")
- Russi Taylor as Fernando "Ferny" Toro, Elly "Ma" Winks (Piggley and Molly's mother) and Ciara "Modern Mom" Winks (Piggley's daughter)
- Tara Strong as Dannan O'Mallard, Molly Winks, Aunt Molly (voice only; "The World According to Molly")
- Nika Futterman as Seamus Winks and Sean Winks (Ciara's twin sons)
- Melissa Disney as Meg Winks (Ciara's daughter)
- Mel Brooks as Wiley the Sheep
- Joan Rivers as Shirley the Sheep (Season 3 only)
- Harry Shearer as Other sheep ("No Girls Allowed")
- Charlie Adler as Mr. Hornsby, Pádraig "Da" Winks (Piggley and Molly's father)
- Neil Ross as Mr. McGandry, Mr. O'Hopper (Fergal's Father), Buck Boylan
- Pamela Adlon as Hector McBadger
- Fernando Escandon as Don Toro
- Kath Soucie as Millie, Katrina
- Thom Adcox-Hernandez as Fergal O'Hopper ("Good Neighbor" and "New Best Friends" only)
- Candi Milo as Gosford
- Susan Silo as Miss Nanny
- Mauri Bernstein as Holly
- Fionnula Flanagan (no relation to Maile) as Grandma O'Mallard
- Jessica DiCicco as Gaddie O'Mallard
- Cathal Nugent as an Angry Old Goat
- David Kelly as Captain Cumara
- Brendan Gleeson as Uncle Fernando "Ferny" Toro
- Peter Anderson as Finbarr Hornsby
- Frank McCourt as Mr. McHoof
- Cobi Jones as Himself (Live & Learn segments only)

=== Additional voices ===
- Charlie Adler
- Jess Harnell
- Katie Leigh
- Neil Ross
- Kath Soucie

=== UK/Irish cast ===
For its UK broadcasting in CBeebies and CBBC, most of the characters were dubbed over by the following actors:

- Angeline Ball
- Gerard Ban Lavery
- Connor Byrne
- Julie-Ann Dean
- Tracy Keating
- Aoife McMahon
- Maria Darling (season one only)
- Joanna Ruiz

The voices of Peadar Lamb, Russi Taylor, Tara Strong, Fernando Escandon, Mel Brooks and Joan Rivers were retained for Grandpa Piggley, Ferny, Dannan, Don Toro, Wiley and Shirley the Sheep respectively.

== DVD releases ==
DVD releases of the series were released by Paramount Home Entertainment.

=== US releases ===
| Title | Release date | Episodes | Ref. |
|---|---|---|---|
| Piggley Gets Into Trouble | July 18, 2006 | Pie Filling; All Night Long; Fir Not; For Whom the Bell Trolls | |
| School Days in Tara | July 18, 2006 | Salmon of Knowledge; Rock Around the Cluck; New Best Friends; A Little Bit of Something Extra! Extra! | |
| Sheep on the Loose | October 31, 2006 | Sheep on the Loose; Waking Thor; Donkeys Into Racehorses; Molly Had a Little Lamb | |
| Spooky Storytellers | August 28, 2007 | No Girls Allowed; Song of the Banshee; The Creepy Cabbages of Galway; Good Neighbour | |
| Treasure Hunt on Raloo Farm | February 19, 2008 | Treasure Hunt; Our Dragon's Egg; Dannan Does a Jig; Growing Pains | |
| Wish Upon a Story | January 14, 2014 | No Girls Allowed; A Little Bit of Something Extra! Extra!; Wish Upon a Story (Parts 1 and 2) | |
| Legends of Raloo | January 14, 2014 | Molly's Dolly; The Legend of Raloo; Lucky 'U'; Searching for a Shamrock | |
| Rock Around the Barn | January 14, 2014 | Song of the Banshee; Rock Around the Cluck; Return of the Raloo Rockers; A Touch of Spain | |

=== UK releases ===
| Title | Release date | Episodes | Ref. |
|---|---|---|---|
| School Days in Tara | October 24, 2005 | The Salmon of Knowledge; Rock Around the Clock; New Best Friends; A Little Bit of Something Extra! Extra! | |
| Treasure Hunt on Raloo Farm | April 10, 2006 | Treasure Hunt; Our Dragon's Egg; Dannan Does a Jig; Growing Pains | |
| Spooky Storytellers | October 23, 2006 | No Girls Allowed; Song of the Banshee; The Creepy Cabbages of Galway; Good Neighbour | |
| Piggley Gets Into Trouble | March 5, 2007 | Pie Filling; All Night Long; Fir Not; For Whom the Bell Trolls | |
| Sheep on the Loose | October 22, 2007 | Sheep on the Loose; Waking Thor; Donkeys Into Racehorses; Molly Had a Little Lamb | |

== Reception ==
=== Critical response ===
CommonSenseMedia gave the show a rating of 4 stars out of 5, commenting "The animation is lovely, the characters are amusing and cute, and the lessons are so gently presented that it really is a pleasure to learn them."

=== Awards ===
- Humanitas Award Children's Animation Category for "The Gift", written by Sindy McKay-Swerdlove, Dennis Haley & Marcy Brown (2007)
- Humanitas Award in the Children's Animation Category for "Waking Thor" Written by Kelly Ward and Cliff McGillivray (2005)
- Emmy Award for Outstanding Directing in an Animated Program (2008)
- Emmy Award for Outstanding Individual in Animation – Storyboard Artist (2007)
- Emmy Award for Outstanding Children's Animated Program (2006)
- Emmy Award for Outstanding Performer in an Animated Program – Maile Flanagan (2006)
- Emmy Award for Outstanding Music Direction & Composition (2005)
- Emmy Award for Outstanding Individual in Animation – Milk Melodrama (2005)
- Emmy Award for Outstanding Individual in Animation – Production Designer (2004)
- Emmy Award for Outstanding Individual in Animation – Storyboard Artist: All Night Long (2004)
- British Academy Children's Award for Best International (2005)
- Chicago International Film Festival Gold Hugo Award in the Animated Series Category (2005)
- Chicago International Film Festival Silver Hugo Award in the Animated Series Category (2004)
- Webby Award for PBS/Jakers! Website (2005)
- Parents' Choice Silver Honor Award in the Television Category (2004 & 2006)
- Genesis Commendation Award from the Humane Society of the United States (2004)
- New York Festivals Gold World Medal Award in the Animation Category for Youth/Young Adult Programs (2006)
- Prix Jeunesse Web Prize Winner (2004)
