= Lochlann Ó Mearáin =

Irish actor

- Born: 8 August 1973 (age 53); Killiney
- Other name: Lochlann O'Mearain
- Years active: 1998–present
- Children: 4

Lochlann Ó Mearáin (born 8 August 1973) is an Irish actor known for playing Rohan in the series Mystic Knights of Tir Na Nog.

== Career ==
In September 1998, Ó Mearáin joined the main cast of the series The Mystic Knights of Tir Na Nog, where he played Rohan until the end of the series in May 1999. In 2000 he played Hoppy Crosby in the series Glenroe. In 2015 he joined the recurring cast of the new Outlander series, where he played Horrocks.

== Personal life ==
Ó Mearáin is married and has four children.

== Filmography ==
=== Television ===
Year	Title	Character	Notes
1998–1999	Mystic Knights of Tir Na Nog	Rohan	50 episodes
2000–2001	Glenroe	Hoppy Crosby	
2001	Rí Rá	Various Characters	
2003	Holby City	Rob Walker	Episode: "For Better, for Worse"
2003	My Hero	Patient	Episode: Time and Time Again
2005	The Clinic	Estate Agent	episode # 3.9
2007	The Tudors	Messenger	Episode: His Majesty, the King
2010	Seacht	Mr. Mellor	Episode # 4.2
2011	Ros na Rún	Dara Ó Ríordáin	9 episodes
2013	Scéal	Artó	Episode: Bás Artó Leary
2014	The Musketeers	Gallagher	Episode: Knight Takes Queen
2015	Vikings	1st Noble	3 episodes
2015	Outlander	Horrocks	2 episodes
2016	Éirí Amach Amú/Wrecking The Rising	Michael Collins	2 episodes; miniseries
2018	Can't Cope, Won't Cope	Ryan	4 episodes
2018	Women on the Verge	Rory	2 episodes
2018–2020	Finding Joy	Human Aidan	7 episodes
2021	Smother	Rory	7 episodes
2022	Holding	Cormac Byrne	
2024	Mr Loverman	Reuben Dempsey	

=== Films ===
Year	Title	Character	Notes
2003	Benedict Arnold: A Question of Honor	Militia Collins	
2004	An Díog Is Faide	Pat O'Callaghan	Short.
2004	King Arthur	Roman Commander	
2008	Nollaig Shona	Fear Gnó	Short.
2009	Holy Water	Donal O'Connell	
2013	The O'Briens	Brendan Blake	
2014	Suanscéal	Priest	Short.
2014	Poison Pen	PC Molloy	
2015	Braid	Isaac	Short.
2015	Pilgrimage	Lopsided	
2015	Jubilee Nurse	Frank Brady	Short.
2016	Love & Friendship	Lord Manwaring	
2019	Supervized	Kevin	
2022	Joyride		

=== Appearances ===
Year	Title	Character	Notes
2016	Je mo Peil	Himself	4-part Irish language documentary with Peter Coonan about Euro 2016
2013	A Terrible Beauty...	Piaras Béaslaí	Documentary
2012	The Summit	Ger McDonnell	Documentary
