= L.A. Comedy Shorts Film Festival =

Coordinates: 34°3′01″N 118°14′43″W

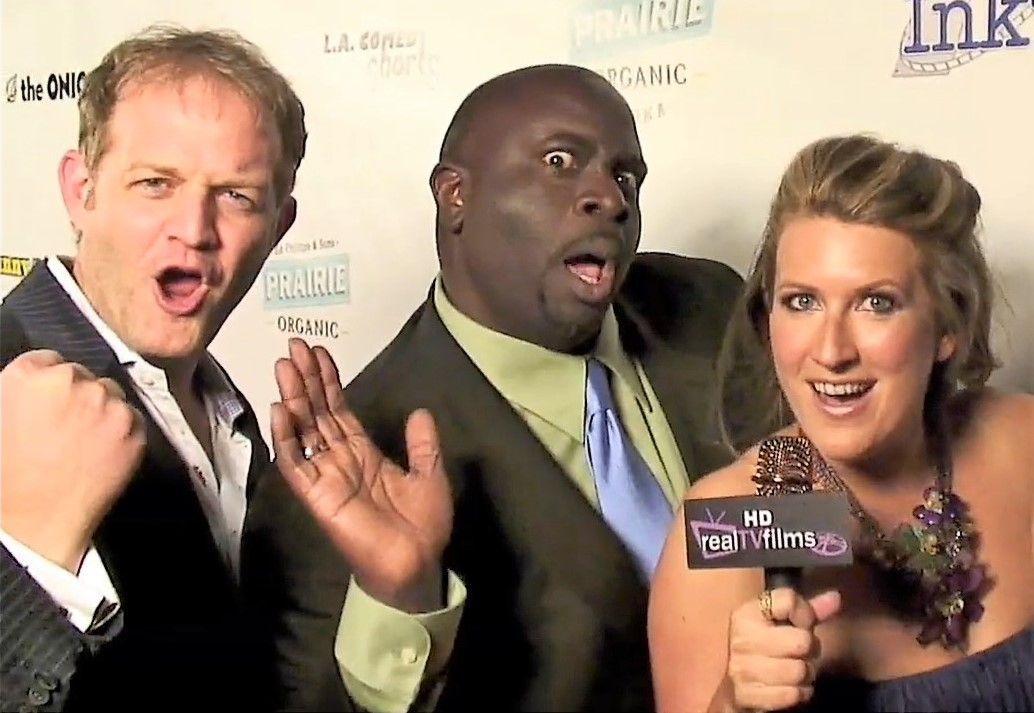
- Left to right, founders Ryan Higman, Gary Anthony Williams, Jeannie Roshar, in 2010
- Location: Los Angeles, California, United States
- Founded: 2009
- Awards received: "Top 25 Film Festivals Worth the Entry Fee"; "Top 10 Film Festivals in the U.S."
- Festival date: April 26, 2012 - April 29, 2012
- Language: International
- Website: https://www.lacomedyfest.com

The L.A. Comedy Shorts Film Festival (LACS) is an annual film festival held in the spring in Los Angeles, California. LACS programs short films exclusively in the comedy genre, and is the largest festival of its kind in the United States. During the four-day event, between 60-90 comedy short films from around the world are screened at the festival's main venue in Downtown Los Angeles, with additional industry panels and parties taking place at various locations around the city. The festival culminates on the final night with a red carpet awards ceremony, where winning filmmakers and screenwriters are honored and the "Commie" award is presented to a comedy industry notable for career achievement and "excelling in achieving outstanding comedical achievements in the field of comedy excellence."

The festival mission states that LACS is "dedicated to introducing the newest and hottest comedic talent to the industry, and helping them make the connections they need to take their careers to the next level." Each year, a selection of films from the festival is screened at multiple venues around the country as part of the L.A. Comedy Shorts Best-of-Fest Tour.

== History ==
L.A. Comedy Shorts was founded in 2009 by Gary Anthony Williams of Boston Legal, along with Festival Director Jeannie Roshar and Festival Producer Ryan Higman. The inaugural festival took place March 5–8, 2009 at The Downtown Independent Theater in Los Angeles, and was sponsored by Funny Or Die, Atom.com and The Onion. Participating celebrities included Mark Hamill, Aisha Tyler, Sean Astin, and awards show host Adam Carolla.

In 2011, LACS added a prize for comedy short student films.

The festival is currently not in operation.

== L.A. Comedy Scripts ==
LACS also hosts the L.A. Comedy Scripts Screenplay Competition, which judges feature-length and short comedy screenplays from around the world. L.A. Comedy Scripts finalists and winners are honored at the LACS awards event.

For the 2010 festival, L.A. Comedy Scripts added the half-hour comedy TV pilots category.

== Awards ==
=== 2013 (Fall) ===
- Funny Or Die's "Best-of-Fest" Grand Prize Award: Cubicle Warriors, directed by Jeff Stephenson

=== 2013 (Spring) ===
- Funny Or Die's "Best-of-Fest" Grand Prize Award: Discoverdale, directed by George Kane

=== 2011 ===
- "Commie" Comedy Achievement Award: Wendi McLendon-Covey
- Funny Or Die's "Best-of-Fest" Grand Prize Award: Bear Force One, directed by Andy Mogren
- Atomic Wedgie's Best Comedy Shortie-Short (under 5 minutes): With or Without U2, by Isabel Fay & Lee York
- Atom.com's Best Comedy Animated Short: Dates on Tape, directed by Chris Lagarce
- Atom.com's Best Comedy Short: The Interview, directed by Michelle Steffes
- Elevate's Best Comedy Student Film: Karl Mulberry, directed by Lorne Hiltser
- State Tax Credit Exchange's Audience Choice Award: Dik, directed by Christopher Stollery
- L.A. Comedy Scripts Best Comedy Short Screenplay: The Curse of Don Scarducci, written by Chris Fondulas
- Movie Magic Screenwriter's Best Comedy Feature Screenplay: Escaping Phoenix, written by Dani Lyman
- L.A. Comedy Scripts Best Half-Hour Comedy TV Pilot: High Noonish, written by Bob Yates

=== 2010 ===
- "Commie" Comedy Achievement Award: Missi Pyle
- Funny Or Die's "Best-of-Fest" Grand Prize Award: The Action Hero's Guide to Saving Lives, directed by Justin Lutsky
- Best Comedy Shortie-Short (under 5 minutes): Traffic Signals, by Lori Elberg & Tanya Bershadsky
- Atom.com's Best Comedy Animated Short: The Cow Who Wanted to be a Hamburger, directed by Bill Plympton
- Atom.com's Best Comedy Short: Blood From a Stone, directed by Bill Palmer
- Film Festival Audience Award: A Short Film, directed by Rick Williamson
- L.A. Comedy Scripts Best Comedy Short Screenplay: Cuckoo, written by Kristi Barnett
- L.A. Comedy Scripts Best Comedy Feature Screenplay: Super Fun Time Happy Pizza, written by Dennis Xenos & Rob Nardecchia
- L.A. Comedy Scripts Best Half-Hour Comedy TV Pilot: Upstate, written by Charlie Robinson

=== 2009 ===
- "Commie" Comedy Achievement Award: Bobcat Goldthwait
- Funny Or Die's "Best-of-Fest" Grand Prize Award: Captain Coulier: Space Explorer, directed by Lyndon Casey
- AtomicWedgie's Best Comedy Shortie-Short (under 5 minutes): The Swear Police, directed by Joe Wilson
- Atom.com's Best Comedy Animated Short: Distraxion, directed by Mike Stern
- Atom.com's Best Comedy Short: Daryl From OnCar, directed by David McWhirter
- AtomicWedgie's Film Festival Audience Award: A Bit of Counseling, directed by Deb Hiett & Richard Kuhlman
- L.A. Comedy Scripts Best Comedy Short Screenplay: Danny Caldwell Goes to Hell, written by Austin Sheeley
- L.A. Comedy Scripts Best Comedy Feature Screenplay: The Rock Thrower, written by Ted Farnath
