= Craig McGinlay =

Scottish actor

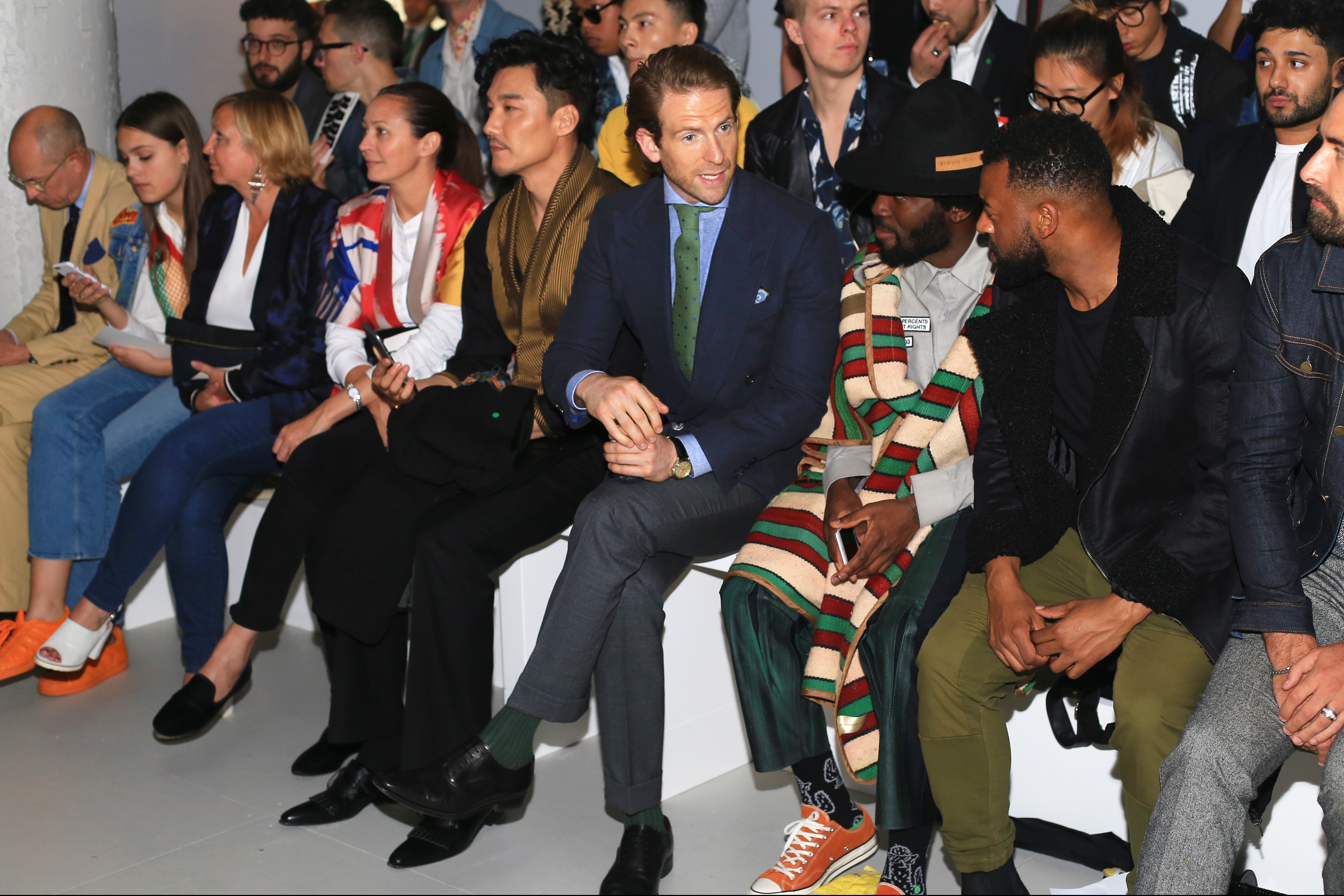
- McGinlay in 2016
- Born: 31 March 1986 (age 38); Paisley, Scotland
- Occupation: Actor
- Years active: 2014–present

Craig McGinlay is a Scottish actor, best known for playing Sir Percival in King Arthur: Legend of the Sword.

== Early life ==
McGinlay grew up in Paisley just outside Gleniffer Braes near Glasgow. His parents are Ronnie (a lawyer) and Hazel. McGinlay earned a sports science degree at University of Stirling and was a rugby player until an injury forced him to leave the sport in 2004. He became a fitness coach until being scouted by a Glasgow modelling agency in 2013.

== Career ==
Moving to London in 2014, McGinlay signed with Independent Talent Agency and Select Model Management in London as well as agencies in Milan, Newcastle and Manchester. He has modelled for Nike, Trespass, Ray-Ban and Land Rover. McGinlay was named Breakthrough Star of the Year at the 2015 Scottish Style Awards. After starring in a Haig whisky commercial directed by Guy Ritchie, McGinlay was offered the role of Percival in King Arthur: Legend of the Sword which was directed by Ritchie and co-starred David Beckham.

== Filmography ==
Film
Year	Title	Role	Notes
2016	Snapshot		
2017	King Arthur: Legend of the Sword	Sir Percival	
2021	Tellurian	Mike Walsh	
2022	Shamshera	Colonel Freddy Young	Hindi film

Television
Year	Title	Role	Notes
2018	Knightfall	Aldred	guest appearance
2024	Blue Lights	Craig	recurring role
