= Payasos Sin Fronteras =

Spanish humanitarian organization

- Formation: 1993
- Type: Non-governmental organization
- Legal status: Association (Spain)
- Headquarters: Barcelona, Spain
- Region served: International

Payasos Sin Fronteras, or Clowns without Borders, is a Spanish humanitarian organization of clowns that performs for free for children affected by war. It was founded in Barcelona in July 1993 and has performed in many war-torn regions such as the former Yugoslavia, Palestine and eastern Democratic Republic of the Congo.

== Origins ==
In 1992, a professional clown from Barcelona received a request from a group of students at the Projecte School in Barcelona to put on shows in refugee camps in the former Yugoslavia. The students offered to accompany the clowns and pay for the costs. On 26 February 1993, the artists performed in the Veli Joze refugee camp on the Istrian peninsula. The reaction from the children validated their impact and the clowns decided to put on a second show two months later with a group of jugglers. This second trip cemented the idea of setting up an organization.

In 1992, different artist groups from Spain (clowns, dancers, magicians, etc.) launched eight trips to the former Yugoslavia and invited other international artists to participate. In 1994 there were 19 trips and in the following years, similar organizations were founded in Belgium, Canada, Germany, Ireland, South Africa, Sweden, Findland, USA and Australia. In 2012, these eleven organizations created an International Federation to improve communication and coordination among entities. From 2012 to 2024, other not-for profits have joined the movement, including Clowns Without Borders UK in 2014.

== Awards and recognition ==
- Creu de Sant Jordi awarded by the Government of Catalonia to recognise PSF’s long trajectory of humanitarian work.
- XIII Premio Joan Alsina de Derechos Humanos, noted in independent NGO evaluations.

== Notable collaborators ==
Spanish actor and clown Pepe Viyuela has taken part in PSF tours and public advocacy related to the organisation’s work, including trips to Palestinian territories.
