= The Rachel Incident =

Irish television series

- Based on: The Rachel Incident by Caroline O'Donoghue
- Screenplay by: Caroline O'Donoghue; Jen Statsky
- Starring: Máiréad Tyers; Ellis Howard; Sarah Greene; Daniel Ings; Jeanne Ní Áinle; Ardal O'Hanlon
- Original language: English

Production
- Production companies: Element Pictures; Universal Content Productions; PageBoy

Original release
- Network: Channel 4

The Rachel Incident is an upcoming Channel 4 television series. It is an adaptation of the Caroline O'Donoghue novel of the same name. It features an ensemble cast including Máiréad Tyers, Ellis Howard, Sarah Greene, Daniel Ings, Jeanne Ní Áinle and Ardal O'Hanlon.

== Premise ==
A young student in Cork, Ireland in 2010 hatches a plot with her housemate to seduce her married professor.

== Cast ==
- Máiréad Tyers as Rachel
- Ellis Howard as James
- Sarah Greene as Deenie
- Daniel Ings as Dr. Fred Byrne
- Jeanne Ní Áinle as Sabrina
- Ardal O'Hanlon as Paul
- Molly McFadden as Sinead
- Maria Doyle Kennedy as Vivian
- Cúán Hosty-Blaney as Carey
- Ciarán Dowd as Ben
- Helen Behan as Bridget

== Production ==
=== Development ===
Jen Statsky and Caroline O'Donoghue co-created the eight-part adaptation of the novel of the same name by O'Donoghue. It is produced by Element Pictures, Universal Content Productions (UCP) and PageBoy. It was announced as an upcoming series for Channel 4 in February 2025. It was first reported to be in development at UCP in June 2023.

Máiréad Tyers, Ellis Howard, Sarah Greene and Daniel Ings were cast in February 2026, with Jeanne Ní Áinle, Ardal O'Hanlon, Molly McFadden, Maria Doyle Kennedy, Cúán Hosty-Blaney, Ciarán Dowd, and Helen Behan.

Filming took place in Ireland in early 2026.

== Broadcast ==
It will air in the United Kingdom on Channel 4.
