= Lyric Theatre, Belfast =

Theatre in Northern Ireland

Coordinates: 54.5773°N 5.9309°W

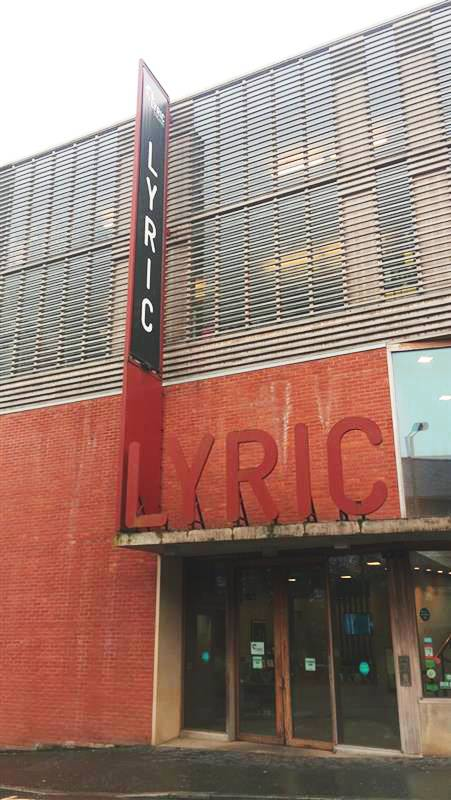
Main entrance to the Lyric Theatre, Belfast

The Lyric Theatre, or simply The Lyric, is the principal, full-time producing theatre in Belfast, Northern Ireland. In January 2023 it won The Stage's Theatre of the Year award in recognition of "its programme...as well as for its online festival of skills development sessions... and their work to attract under-represented audiences through LGBT+ productions, as well as for their extensive education and outreach programme."

The theatre's current Executive Producer is Jimmy Fay, previously the founder and Artistic Director of Bedrock Productions.

== History ==
The theatre was first established as The Lyric Players in 1951 at the home of its founders Mary O'Malley and her husband Pearse in Derryvolgie Avenue, off the Malone Road, and moved to its new site on Ridgeway Street in 1968, between the Stranmillis Road and Stranmillis Embankment. The poet Austin Clarke laid the foundation stone in 1965 – a deliberate choice by O'Malley to build a link back to her artistic hero W. B. Yeats.

In 1974 the theatre staged Andrew Lloyd Webber's Jesus Christ Superstar, leading to protests. In 1976 Liam Neeson appeared in Brian Friel's Philadelphia Here I Come!. Neeson's association with the Lyric has continued since, and he is currently the theatre's patron. Several of Friel's plays have been staged at the theatre, including Dancing at Lughnasa in 1996 and 2015. A number of Marie Jones plays have been staged there including A Very Weird Manor.

Charles Nowosielski was Artistic Director of the theatre from 1991 to 1993. He directed the Lyric Players in productions of Daphne Du Maurier's Rebecca, with Orla Brady in the title role, in January/February 1992, George Bernard Shaw's Arms and the Man in October 1992 and Willy Russell's Stags and Hens in October 1993.

In 2004 the theatre announced a fundraising campaign to redevelop the theatre on its existing site. In June 2007 a £1m donation by Northern Irish businessman Dr Martin Naughton kickstarted the development. Naughton's donation was the largest in Northern Ireland arts history. He had previously made donations to Queen's University, where the Naughton Gallery is named in his honour.

== New Lyric Theatre ==
The new theatre, designed by O'Donnell & Tuomey, opened on 1 May 2011, with a Gala Performance of The Crucible. The new facility features a new main theatre with a seating capacity of almost 400 and a multi-function performance space 'The Naughton Studio' which can seat between 120 and 170. This new theatre was an almost threefold increase in the size of the previous building and the theatre remains the largest employer of actors and other theatre professionals in the region.

The Lyric's current Chair is Sir Bruce Robinson who took over in January 2015 from BBC Northern Ireland journalist Mark Carruthers, who received an OBE at Buckingham Palace on 25 March 2011, in recognition of his leadership of the theatre at a highly critical time in its development.

Since the theatre re-opened a permanent exhibition of the work of Belfast-born visual artist Colin Davidson has been on display at the theatre where he personally presented his work to Her Majesty Queen Elizabeth II and the President of Ireland during the Royal visit to Northern Ireland on 27 June 2012. This was the occasion, and the Lyric was the chosen site, for a public meeting between Queen Elizabeth II and Martin McGuinness, Deputy First Minister for the Northern Ireland Assembly and a former commander of the IRA. The event is viewed by many as a positive sign for the ongoing peace process in Northern Ireland.

In October 2018, as part of the theatre's 50th anniversary on the Stranmillis site, that theme of being "a shared place, a crossroads between communities" was marked at a symposium and over a weekend of celebratory events with the Irish Times noting the Lyric was a cultural bridge in a divided city.

In 2023 the theatre reported an overall annual audience of over 90,000 people and having engaged close to 13,000 school children as part of the Creative Learning programme.

== 75th Anniversary ==
In Jan 2026 the theatre began a year long celebration of their 75 years of existence, supported by the Heritage Lottery Fund. A special week long programme of readings, in conversation events, documentary screenings and an exhibition told the story of the theatre's development from Derryvolgie Ave, then to Ridgeway St in 1968 and on to the building of today's theatre, under the chairmanship of Mark Carruthers in 2011. The Belfast Telegraph noted of this anniversary "culturally, its significance has stood the test of time, but it also shared in a particularly meaningful moment in the history of the peace process."

SDLP MP Claire Hanna tabled an Early Day Motion in the UK Parliament for the occasion which "acknowledges that the Lyric kept its doors open and provided a truly shared space throughout some of the most complex and turbulent years of Northern Ireland’s past."

== Productions ==
- Tea in a China Cup, 2026, by Christina Reid
- Group!, 2026, by Conor Mitchell
- The Human Voice, by Jean Cocteau, adapted by Darren Murphy 2026, (with Prime Cut Productions)
- Dear Arabella, 2025, by Marie Jones (from Patrick Talbot Productions and Rathmore Productions)
- The Importance of Being Earnest, 2026, by Oscar Wilde
- Denouement, 2025, by John Morton (with Belfast International Arts Festival)
- Our New Girl, 2025, by Nancy Harris
- The Tragedy of Richard III, 2024, by William Shakespeare, adapted by Michael Patrick
- The Pillowman, 2024, by Martin McDonagh
- Cailíní, 2024, by Íde Simpson and Beth Strahan (with ABLAZE productions)
- Little Women, 2024, by Louisa May Alcott
- The Beauty Queen of Leenane, 2023, by Martin McDonagh
- Romeo and Juliet, 2022, by William Shakespeare, adapted by Anne Bailie
- Propaganda, 2022, by Conor Mitchell
- Rough Girls, 2021, by Tara Lynne O'Neill it was later filmed for BBC Four
- The Border Game, 2021 (with 2022 remount), by Michael Patrick and Oisín Kearney (with Prime Cut Productions)
- Crocodile Fever, 2019, by Meghan Tyler (with Traverse Theatre)
- The Alternative, 2019, by Michael Patrick and Oisín Kearney
- Here Comes The Night, 2016, by Rosemary Jenkinson
- Smiley, 2016, by Gary Mitchell
- Death of a Comedian, 2015, by Owen McCafferty (with Abbey Theatre and Soho Theatre)
- Demented, 2014, by Gary Mitchell
- Mistletoe & Crime, 2014, by Marie Jones
- Can't Forget About You, 2013, by David Ireland (with Tron Theatre)
- Love, Billy, 2013, by Graham Reid
- The Man Jesus, 2013, by Matthew Hurt
- Molly Wobbly's T*t Factory, 2012, by Paul Boyd
- The Civilisation Game, 2012, by Tim Loane
- White Star of the North 2012, by Rosemary Jenkinson
- The Absence of Women, 2010, by Owen McCafferty
- Santa Claus .. What the Reindeer Saw, 2008
- To Be Sure, 2007, by Tim Loane
- 1974, 2006, by Damian Gorman
- Merry Christmas Betty Ford, 2005, by Conor Mitchell
- The Snow Queen, 2005, by Hans Christian Andersen, adapted by Richard Croxford
- A Very Weird Manor, 2005, by Marie Jones
- Paradise, 2004, by Alan McKee
- McCool XXL, 2002, by Paul Boyd
- Marching On, 2000, by Gary Mitchell
- The Butterfly of Killybegs, 2000, by Brian Foster
- Alice's Adventures in Wonderland, 1998, by Paul Boyd
- Getting the Picture, 1998, by David Pownall
- Tearing the Loom, 1998, by Gary Mitchell
- To Hell with Faust, 1998, by Zoë Seaton
- Drive On!, 1996, by Bill Morrison
- The Desert Lullaby: A Play in Two Acts, 1996, by Jennifer Johnston
- Lengthening Shadows, 1995, by Graham Reid
- Hidden Curriculum (revival), 1994, by Graham Reid
- Galloping Buck Jones, 1994, by Ken Bourke (playwright)
- Pictures of Tomorrow, 1994, by Martin Lynch
- The Private Picture Show, 1994, by Owen McCafferty
- How Many Miles to Babylon?, 1993, 2014, by Jennifer Johnston
- Arms and the Man, 1992, by George Bernard Shaw
- Round the Big Clock, 1992, by John Boyd
- Pygmies in the Ruins, 1991, by Ron Hutchinson
- Rough Beginnings, 1991, by Robert Ellison
- Charlie Gorilla, 1989, by John McClelland
- The Belle of Belfast City, 1989, by Christina Reid
- Culture Vultures, 1988, by Robin Glendinning
- Summer Class, 1986, by John Boyd
- Minstrel Boys, 1985, by Martin Lynch
- Northern Star, 1984, by Stewart Parker
- Remembrance, 1984, by Graham Reid
- Castles in the Air, 1983, by Martin Lynch
- Indian Summer, 1983, by Jennifer Johnston
- Tea in a China Cup, 1983, by Christina Reid
- Kingdom Come, 1982, by Stewart Parker
- Speranza's Boy, 1982, by John Boyd
- The Interrogation of Ambrose Fogarty, 1982, by Martin Lynch
- Dockers, 1981, by Martin Lynch
- My Silver Bird, 1981, by Patrick Galvin
- Old Days, 1981, by Frank Dunne
- Victims, 1981, by Eugene McCabe it was later filmed for RTÉ
- Dark Rosaleen, 1980, by Vincent Mahon
- Facing North, 1979, by John Boyd
- Európé, 1978, by Dominic Behan
- The Rise and Fall of Barney Kerrigan, 1977, by Frank Dunne
- The Street, 1977, by John Boyd
- The Rise and Fall of Barney Kerrigan, 1977 by Frank Dunne
- It Would Be Funny..., 1975, by Tom Coffey (playwright)
- Guests, 1974, by John Boyd
- We Do It For Love, 1974, by Patrick Galvin
- The Last Burning, 1974 by Patrick Galvin
- Nightfall to Belfast, 1973, by Patrick Galvin
- The Farm, 1972, by John Boyd
- The Lads, 1972, by Joe O'Donnell
- The Flats (Belfast 1971), 1971, (1984) by John Boyd
- Lá Fhéile Míchíl, 1963, by Eoghan Ó Tuairisc
- Happy as Larry, 1947, by Donagh MacDonagh, staged at Dublin's Abbey Theatre
