= Jeanne Ní Áinle =

Irish actress

Jeanne Nicole Ní Áinle
- Education: Inchicore College of Further Education
- Occupations: Actress, model
- Years active: 2020–present

Jeanne Nicole Ní Áinle is an Irish actor and model. Ní Áinle was named a 2025 Rising Star Ireland by Screen International.

== Early life ==
Ní Áinle was born in Dublin to an Ivorian father and Irish mother. They are Gaeilgeoir, having studied the Irish language since primary school. Ní Áinle studied theatre performance at the Inchicore College of Further Education.

== Career ==
=== Modelling ===
Ní Áinle began their career in modeling and had their first magazine cover on Confetti Magazine. They were also the face of the Helen Steele X Dunnes Stores line.

=== Acting ===
==== Stage ====
Ní Áinle won the best performer award at Dublin Fringe Festival in 2023 for their performance in Moonfish Theatre's bilingual Irish/English play The Crow’s Way.

In 2025, Ní Áinle appeared at the Lyric Theatre, Belfast in Nancy Harris play Our New Girl.

==== Film and television ====
Early screen acting roles included performances in the feature film Who We Love (2021) by Graham Cantwell and the second season of Amy Huberman's television series Finding Joy (2020). Ní Áinle appeared in a leading role as Rosa in the Irish film Holy Island by Robert Manson. They could be seen as Fiona in RTÉ television series Clean Sweep in 2023. Ní Áinle had a starring role as Hana in RTÉ series North Sea Connection, alongside Sinead Cusack, amongst others.

Ní Áinle has also been seen in George Kane science-fiction comedy film Apocalypse Clown, and fantasy adventure film Dungeons & Dragons: Honour Among Thieves. Roles in several short films include Prelude To An Abduction, a mystery drama directed by David Turpin, Helio León short film Sister Of The Dogs, and Postcards From Heaney Country, directed Nathan Fagan.

Ní Áinle has upcoming roles in David Lowery drama Mother Mary alongside Michaela Coel and Anne Hathaway, amongst others, as well as in Netflix comedy series How to Get to Heaven from Belfast.

== Partial filmography ==
Year	Title	Role	Notes
2021	Holy Island	Rosa	Lead role
2022	Bad Sisters	Dance teacher	1 episode
2022	North Sea Connection	Hana	4 episodes
2022	Dungeons & Dragons: Honour Among Thieves	Wizard contestant	Feature film
2023	Clean Sweep	Fiona	6 episodes
2023	Apocalypse Clown	Dr. Brady	Feature film
2026	How to Get to Heaven from Belfast	Niamh	
2026	Mother Mary†	TBA	Feature film
TBA	The Rachel Incident†	Sabrina	Main cast
