= Solas Nua =

Irish arts group in Washington, D.C.

- Company type: Theatre, Film, Literature, Visual Arts, Dance, Music
- Founded: 2005; 20 years ago
- Founder: Linda Murray
- Headquarters: Washington D.C.
- Website: http://www.solasnua.org

Solas Nua ([ˈsˠɔlˠəsˠ n̪ˠuː]; "new light" in Irish) is a Washington, D.C.-based Irish contemporary arts organization. Founded in 2005, its first event was a production of the play Disco Pigs by Enda Walsh. While it is best known for its theatre offerings, Solas Nua also presents programming in areas including film, music, visual arts and literature. The organization puts special emphasis on promoting recent work by up-and-coming Irish artists.

== Past theater productions ==
In its 2008–09 season Solas Nua performed Disco Pigs by Enda Walsh at 59E59 Theaters in New York City as part of the first Irish Theater Festival. Solas Nua produced this play again in D.C. in their 2009–10 season. In the 2008–09 season Linda Murray directed Gerald Murphy's Take Me Away and Des Kennedy directed the American premiere of Marina Carr's Woman and Scarecrow. Solas Nua also produced a series of readings of 11 plays commissioned by Belfast theater company Tinderbox.

In Solas Nua's 2009–10 season they presented David Ireland's Everything Between Us in D.C., Buffalo and Philadelphia. They also produced Rosemary Jenkinson's Johnny Meister and the Stitch.

2010–11 events included Swampoodle by Tom Swift. This place-based performance was created in collaboration with Ireland's Performance Corporation at the U-Line Arena. Solas Nua also presented John Paul Murphy's The Prophet of Monto and Arthur Riordan and Bell Helicopter's musical Improbable Frequency.

In 2012–13 Solas Nua commissioned and performed Bradley O’Gill and the Little People by Tom Swift.

In 2014 Solas Nua began play-reading series in Washington, D.C. and in Boston.

In 2015, Solas Nua hired Rex Daugherty as the second artistic director of the company. He had previously appeared as an actor in Solas Nua productions and became a company member in 2008. His theatre productions have earned Solas Nua their first Helen Hayes Award (Outstanding Ensemble - The Frederick Douglass Project).

2016 - Wild Sky by Deirdre Kinahan and Little Thing Big Thing by Donal O'Kelly.

2017 - Coolatully by Fiona Doyle and the updated Misterman by Enda Walsh.

*Misterman was nominated for a Helen Hayes Award in Outstanding Sound Design.

2018 - The Frederick Douglass Project by Psalmayene 24 and Deirdre Kinahan and How to Keep an Alien by Sonya Kelly.

*The Frederick Douglass Project was a Solas Nua commission, staged on a floating pier on the Anacostia River, overlooking Douglass' historic home in DC. The play earned 6 Helen Hayes nominations, was the recipient of The Helen Hayes Award for Outstanding Ensemble and was listed by The Washington Post as "one of the best theatre productions of the year." How to Keep an Alien was also nominated for Outstanding Sound Design.

2019 - Silent written and performed by Pat Kinevan (from Fishamble: The New Play Company) and The Smuggler by Ronan Noone.

*Silent was nominated for two Helen Hayes Awards, Outstanding Visiting Production and Outstanding Visiting Performer. The Smuggler, a one-man show starring artistic director Rex Daugherty, was listed by The New York Times Readers' Choice as one of the best theatre productions of the year, nationwide.

== Other activities ==
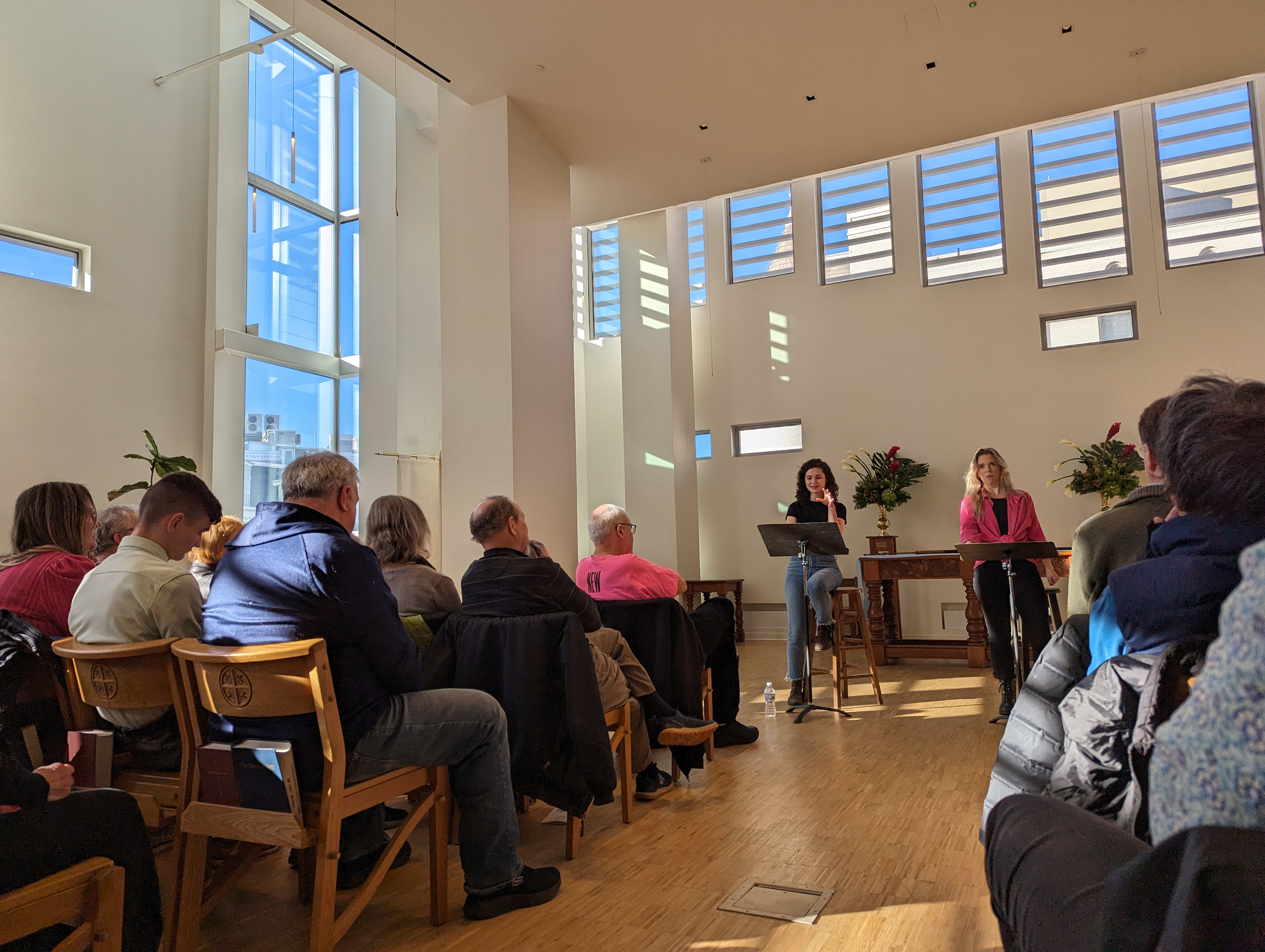
A stage reading of the play May Day organized by Solas Nua

Regular events include a film screening series called Irish Popcorn! Solas Nua also presents Irish films at their annual Capital Irish Film Festival. Each year Solas Nua gives away thousands of Irish books on their Irish Book Day (March 17). In 2014 Solas Nua collaborated with Irish literary magazine The Stinging Fly to create an original Irish Book Day publication for the first time. What's the Story? included short stories and poems by authors including Kevin Barry.

Additional programming includes visual arts and video art exhibitions, multiple book clubs, music and dance.
