= Alan Reeves =

Alan Reeves may refer to:

- Alan Reeves (footballer) (born 1967), British central defender
- Alan Reeves (composer), British musician
