= David Ireland (playwright) =

Northern Irish-born playwright and actor

David Ireland (born 1976 or 1977) is a Northern Irish-born playwright and actor, known for his award-winning plays Cyprus Avenue and Ulster American.

== Early life and education ==
David Ireland was born in 1976 or 1977 Sandy Row, Belfast, but grew up in Ballybeen, Dundonald, County Down. His father was a heavy drinker. He was raised as a Protestant, but gave up his faith as a teenager (later embracing Christianity as an adult).

Ireland attended Brooklands Primary School. He then attended the Royal Belfast Academical Institution, before receiving training at the Royal Scottish Academy of Music and Drama. He began drinking whisky at a young age.

As a young boy, he wrote poems and stories, but later, by the age of 18, he had stopped writing and wanted to be an actor.

== Career ==
=== Stage ===
After being unemployed as an actor for some years, aged around 30, Ireland started to write plays, and found it much more enjoyable than acting. In 2009, his What The Animals Say was produced by Òran Mór in Glasgow as part of their lunchtime programme of new plays, "A Play, a Pie and a Pint". After this, he started getting calls from TV producers. In 2010, Everything Between Us, first produced by Solas Nua and Tinderbox Theatre Company, was performed in Belfast, Scotland, and Washington, D.C. It won the Stewart Parker Trust Award, the BBC Audio Drama Award, and the Meyer-Whitworth Award for Best New Play.

In 2016, Ireland's Cyprus Avenue premiered at the Royal Court Theatre. It was awarded the 2017 Irish Times Theatre Award for Best New Play, and the 2017 James Tait Black Memorial Prize for Drama. The play then transferred to The Public Theater, New York City, the Abbey Theatre, Dublin, and the Metropolitan Arts Centre, Belfast. It returned to the Royal Court in February 2019 for a four-week run, and had its Australian debut in May 2019 at Sydney's Old Fitzroy Theatre. The Abbey Theatre performance with Stephen Rea was ranked by The Guardian writers as the 27th best theatre show since 2000.

In 2018, Ireland's satirical dark comedy Ulster American was performed by Traverse Theatre as part of their Edinburgh Festival Fringe season. It was awarded the Carol Tambor Best of Edinburgh Award for that year. In 2019, it was nominated for Best Female Performance, Best New Play, Best Production, and Best Male Performance at the Critics' Awards for Theatre in Scotland, winning the first three. It had its London debut at Riverside Studios in 2023 in a production starring Woody Harrelson, Andy Serkis and Louisa Harland. In 2025, a production of Ulster American by The Balally Players placed second overall in the national RTÉ All-Ireland Drama Festival Circuit competition and received the Abbey Award. The production later transferred to the Abbey Theatre’s Peacock Stage, where it played four sold-out performances in May 2025.

In August 2024, his play The Fifth Step (the first since 2018) was staged at the Royal Lyceum Theatre in Edinburgh as part of the Edinburgh International Festival, with two men, played by Jack Lowden and Sean Gilder meeting at Alcoholics Anonymous. Directed by Finn den Hertog, reviewer Arifa Akbar called the play "a puzzle of a play, but in a good way", giving the production 4 out of 5 stars. In May 2025 the play came to London, in a National Theatre production directed by Finn den Hertog, with Jack Lowden reprising his role opposite Martin Freeman. Chris Wiegand, writing in The Guardian, gave the production 4 out of 5 stars, calling the play a "knotty, often hilarious two-hander" The NT production was released in cinemas in November 2025 by National Theatre Live.

=== Television ===
==== Writing ====
Ireland's first writing for TV was on River City, a soap set in Glasgow, and he went on to write an episode of the RTÉ/BBC sitcom The Young Offenders.

His first creation on television was the 2023 Sky Atlantic series The Lovers. Ireland wrote ITV's six-part black comedy thriller Coldwater, which aired in September 2025.

==== Acting ====
In 2018, Ireland played Sean Devlin in the Channel 4 sitcom Derry Girls.

== Personal life ==
Ireland met his wife Jennifer while he was acting in Glasgow. They have two children.

He was an alcoholic as a young man, but gave up drinking at 23. Having given up the Christian faith he was raised in as a teenager, he embrace Christianity again as an adult, from around 2020.

== Awards ==
- 2010: Winner, Stewart Parker Trust Award – Everything Between Us
- 2010?: BBC Audio Drama Award – Everything Between Us
- 2010?: Winner, Meyer-Whitworth Award for Best New Play – Everything Between Us
- 2017: Winner, Irish Times Theatre Award for Best New Play – Cyprus Avenue
- 2017: Winner, James Tait Black Memorial Prize for Drama – Cyprus Avenue
- 2018: Winner, Carol Tambor Best of Edinburgh Award – Ulster American
- 2019: Winner, Critics' Awards for Theatre in Scotland for Best Female Performance, Best New Play, and Best Production – Ulster American

== Selected works ==
- What The Animals Say (Òran Mór, Glasgow, 2009)
- Everything Between Us (Tinderbox Theatre Company, 2010)
- Summertime (Tinderbox Theatre Company, 2013)
- Can't Forget About You (Lyric Theatre, Belfast, 2013)
- Most Favoured (2012; Soho Theatre, 2025)
- Cyprus Avenue (Royal Court Theatre, 2016)
- The End of Hope (Soho Theatre, 2017)
- Ulster American (Traverse Theatre, 2018)
- Yes So I Said Yes (Finborough Theatre, 2021)
- The Fifth Step (Edinburgh Festival, 2024; @sohoplace, 2025)

== Selected filmography ==
=== Actor ===
- Shetland (2014; S2 Eps. 5 & 6, as Finlay Caulfield)
- Still Game (1 episode, 2016)
- Derry Girls (3 episodes, 2018-2022)

=== Writer ===
- The Lovers (Sky Atlantic, 2023)
- Coldwater (6 episodes, ITV, 2025)
