= Emily Flain =

Northern Irish actress (born 2003)

- Born: 2003 (age 22–23); Lisburn, Northern Ireland, UK
- Education: Laurel Hill Community College
- Occupation: Actress
- Years active: 2016–present
- Television: How to Get to Heaven from Belfast

Emily Flain (born 2003) is a Northern Irish actress. Her acting career began in 2016 while she was in college and she has appeared in various films. She played a leading role in the 2017 historical war film Zoo. After that, she played a leading role in the comedy thriller series How to Get to Heaven from Belfast (2026) and the horror film The Morrigan (2026). She appeared on the Belfast Telegraph list of entertainers that would "tear up the world of entertainment" in 2025.

== Life and career ==
Emily Flain was born in 2003. She is from Lisburn in Northern Ireland. In August 2013, while she was a student at Ballymacash Primary School, she was one of four pupils shortlisted for naming the new housing development in Lisburn. All four were awarded gift vouchers for their creativity. She later studied for college at the Laurel Hill Community College.

Flain started her acting career in 2016, while she was in college. Flain appeared in the second episode of TG4's Na Dulradóirí, a TV series about Northern Ireland's wildlife where she and her students learned about foxes in September. She was given the role after securing an audition with Extras NI. Flain said of the experience, "I had a fantastic time filming the show and I loved the hands on experience with all the animals". She also found the fox "so cute [that] I could have taken him home". In September the same year, principal photography on the historical war film Zoo started, where Flain starred as Jane. She said that she was "very lucky" to be acting in the film and was "part of a 'once in a lifetime experience'". She found the elephant Nellie to be the "real star" and "wonderful to film with". Flain added, "We only had her for about 20 minutes at a time because obviously it is important not to stress her out. It was scary at first but I got over it and really enjoyed it". The film premiered in Belfast on 19 June 2018.

After her appearance in Zoo, Flain later appeared in the TV series Marcella (2021) and Silverpoint (2022–2023). In January 2025, the Belfast Telegraph listed Emily Flain as one of the seventeen entertainers of Northern Ireland that would "tear up the world of entertainment" that year. Three months later, Flain appeared on ITV News' UTV Life, where the TV presenter announced that she had a role in Lisa McGee's comedy thriller series How to Get to Heaven from Belfast. She played as the young version of Saoirse Shaw (Roisin Gallagher). She later appeared in the horror film The Morrigan as Lily, the daughter of Fiona (Saffron Burrows). The film was released for digital platforms on 29 June 2026. In September 2026, it has been revealed that Flain has been cast on the second series of the crime thriller television series Nightsleeper as Eabha.

== Filmography ==
Year	Title	Role	Notes	Ref.
2016	Na Dulradóirí	—N/a	1 episode	
2017	Zoo	Jane	Historical war film	
2021	Marcella	Jessie Healy	Nordic noir detective series	
2022–23	Silverpoint	Emma	Sci-fi teen television series	
2026	How to Get to Heaven from Belfast	Young Saoirse	Comedy thriller television series	
2026	The Morrigan	Lily	Horror film	
TBA	Nightsleeper	Eabha	Crime thriller television series	
