= Lazarus (British TV series) =

British television series

- Also known as: Harlan Coben's Lazarus
- Genre: Thriller; Psychological horror
- Created by: Harlan Coben; Danny Brocklehurst
- Starring: Bill Nighy; Alexandra Roach; Sam Claflin
- Country of origin: United Kingdom
- Original language: English
- No. of series: 1
- No. of episodes: 6

Production
- Executive producers: Harlan Coben; Danny Brocklehurst; Nicola Shindler; Richard Fee; Wayne Che Yip; Sam Claflin
- Producer: Matt Strevens
- Production companies: Amazon MGM Studios; Final Twist Productions; Quay Street Productions

Original release
- Network: Amazon Prime Video
- Release: 22 October 2025

Lazarus (also known as Harlan Coben's Lazarus) is a British horror-thriller television miniseries for Amazon Prime Video created by Harlan Coben and Danny Brocklehurst, and starring Bill Nighy, Alexandra Roach and Sam Claflin. It premiered on 22 October 2025.

== Synopsis ==
A forensic psychiatrist (Claflin) investigates cold case murders after returning to his family home following the death of his father (Nighy).

== Cast ==
=== Main ===
- Bill Nighy as Doctor Lazarus (Dr L)
- Alexandra Roach as Jenna Lazarus
  - Lucy Chambers as young Jenna
- Sam Claflin as Joel 'Laz' Lazarus
  - Ewan Horrocks Young Laz
- David Fynn as Seth McGovern
  - Joseph Mason-Coombs as young Seth
- Karla Crome as Bella
  - Leni Zieglmeier as young Bella
- Kate Ashfield as Detective Alison Brown
- Curtis Tennant as Aidan
- Lloyd Lai as Rupert Yuen

=== Recurring ===
- Eloise Little as Sutton Lazarus
- Edward Hogg as Sam Olsen
  - Cormac De Bhál as young Sam
- Sianad Gregory as Cassandra Rhodes
- Jack Deam as Arlo Gregory
- Roisin Gallagher as Laura Mainard / Laura Hampton
- Amanda Root as Margot MacIntyre
- Lex Shrapnel as Billy McIntyre
  - Charlie Mann as young Billy
- Leon Ockenden as Neil Croft
- Rupert Young as Paul Catton

== Episodes ==
No.	Title	Directed by	Written by	Original release date
1	101	Wayne Che Yip	Harlan Coben & Danny Brocklehurst	22 October 2025
2	102	Wayne Che Yip	Danny Brocklehurst	22 October 2025
3	103	Nicole Volavka	Tom Farrelly	22 October 2025
4	104	Nicole Volavka	Megan Gallagher	22 October 2025
5	105	Daniel O'Hara	Mick Ford	22 October 2025
6	106	Daniel O'Hara	Danny Brocklehurst	22 October 2025

== Production ==
It was reported in February 2024 that Amazon MGM Studios would produce the series in association with Harlan Coben's Final Twist Productions. Coben and Danny Brocklehurst are writers and executive producers on the series. Sam Claflin who also starred, Nicola Shindler and Richard Fee executive produced via Quay Street Productions. Wayne Che Yip executive produced the series and directed on the first two episodes. Matt Strevens served as series producer for Quay Street Productions.

Bill Nighy and Alexandra Roach were reported to be cast alongside Sam Claflin in February 2024. In June 2024, Roisin Gallagher, David Fynn, Karla Crome, Kate Ashfield and Curtis Tennant were added to the cast.

Filming got underway in Manchester in February 2024. Liverpool was used for some of the location filming, with the city's Georgian Quarter, Stanley Dock and Sefton Park being utilised. Filming also took place in Morecambe. The wrap party was held in Manchester on 21 June 2024.

== Release ==
Lazarus premiered on 22 October 2025, with all six episodes.

== Reception ==
The review aggregator website Rotten Tomatoes reported a 44% approval rating based on 27 critic reviews. The website's critics consensus reads, "Harlan Coben's Lazarus delivers emotional performances and a suitably spooky mood, but its clunky dialogue and increasingly preposterous plotting turn it into a fundamentally underwhelming slog." Metacritic, which uses a weighted average, gave a score of 53 out of 100 based on 13 critics, indicating "mixed or average".
