= Mark Carruthers =

Northern Irish journalist

- Education: Queen's University Belfast
- Occupations: Broadcaster and journalist

Mark Carruthers OBE is a Northern Irish journalist and broadcaster. He has presented a number of television and radio programmes for BBC Northern Ireland.

== Early life and education ==
Mark Carruthers was born in Derry, grew up in Limavady, County Londonderry.

He studied at Coleraine Academical Institution and went on to study for degrees in political science and Irish politics at Queen's University Belfast.

== Career ==
=== Broadcasting work ===
Carruthers first joined BBC Northern Ireland in 1989, contributing to Good Morning Ulster and PM Ulster on BBC Radio Ulster.

In addition to having presented BBC Newsline, he has also presented Spotlight and Let's Talk for television and Evening Extra on BBC Radio Ulster.

In August 2009, Carruthers became part of the presenting team of Good Morning Ulster as part of a series of presenter changes at BBC Radio Ulster.

In 2015 he was the presenter of The View and Sunday Politics on BBC One Northern Ireland. He also presents the weekly politics podcast Red Lines on BBC Sounds.

=== Theatre ===
Carruthers was a co-founder of the Tinderbox Theatre Company in 1988, along with Lalor Roddy, Tim Loane, and others.

He took part in drama groups at college and university, including a stage appearance in a Riverside Theatre, Coleraine, production of Oliver! alongside James Nesbitt.

He was chairman of the Lyric Theatre board until 2015, and was at the forefront of the campaign to rebuild the theatre on its south Belfast site for almost ten years.

== Selected publications ==
Carruthers is co-editor of Stepping Stones - The Arts in Ulster 1971-2001, which was published by Blackstaff Press in 2001.

In 2013 Alternative Ulsters – Conversations on Identity was published by Liberties Press, a series of interviews by Carruthers with leading writers, actors, journalists, and politicians.

Colin Davidson: Twelve Paintings – Conversations with Mark Carruthers, was published by Merrion Press in November 2025.

== Accolades ==
Carruthers was appointed an OBE for services to drama in Northern Ireland in the 2011 New Year Honours list.

In 2014, Alternative Ulsters was shortlisted for the prestigious Christopher Ewart-Biggs Memorial Prize.

In July 2019 Carruthers was awarded an honorary doctorate (Doctor of Literature) from Queen's University Belfast for distinction in broadcasting. In November 2023 he was awarded a Visiting Professorship in Media at Ulster University.
