= Lalor Roddy =

Northern Irish actor

- Born: Belfast, Northern Ireland
- Occupation: Actor
- Years active: 1987-

Lalor Roddy is an Irish actor from Belfast. He was a co-founder, in 1988, and then co-artistic director, of the Tinderbox Theatre Company. He is known in Ireland for his stage work, but better known internationally for extensive work in film and on television.

== Early life and education ==
Lalor Roddy was born and grew up in Belfast, Northern Ireland. His mother was associated with the Lyric Theatre in its early days.

As a young man, he left for the United States to play football. Upon his return to Northern Ireland, he majored in psychology at the University of Ulster.

== Career ==
Roddy had been worked as a psychologist in England until he returned home to Ireland at the age of 33 to take up acting.

=== Tinderbox Theatre Company ===
In 1988, he co-founded the Tinderbox Theatre Company in Belfast, along with Tim Loane, BBC presenter Mark Carruthers, BBC drama producer Stephen Wright, and Angela McCloskey of the Lyric Theatre. Tinderbox produced produced two plays by Harold Pinter, which were produced on the very modest budget of £75 each. In 1989, the Tinderbox company received a cheque from the playwright Samuel Beckett, described as the "ultimate endorsement" in the world of Irish theatre. From 1989 to 2000, the Tinderbox company hosted an annual Festival of New Irish Playwriting intended to present "artistically dangerous" new plays. The intention behind the Tinderbox was to challenge the sectarian hatreds in Ulster that led to 'the Troubles' of Northern Ireland, and create a theatre company that would "despite the system" put on new plays that might bring people together. Roddy was one of the co-artistic directors of the company.

The Tinderbox company came to be, in the 1990s and 2000s, one of the leading theatre companies in Belfast. It continues to develop, commission, and produce important new plays. Notable productions by Tinderbox include This Love Thing by Marina Carr (1991); Ruby by Marie Jones (2000); Convictions, performed in Crumlin Road Courthouse (2000); and Girls and Dolls by Lisa McGee (2006)

=== Acting work ===
Roddy's performances in Belfast attracted attention of the Royal Shakespeare Company (RSC) and he played roles in the RSC's productions of Billy Roche’s Amphibians and James Robson's King Baby. In 1998, he played with the RSC for a full season at the company's home in Stratford-upon-Avon.

Roddy starred in two plays with the Abbey Theatre in Dublin, namely Observe the Sons of Ulster Marching Towards the Somme and In a Little World of Our Own. For the latter play, he won the ESB/Irish Times Award for best supporting actor. Observe the Sons of Ulster Marching Towards the Somme, with its sympathetic portrayal of Protestant Ulstermen serving in the British Army during the First World War, the leader of whom is a repressed homosexual, was described as a "landmark" play in Dublin, and Roddy's performance in the play did much to enhance his reputation. In a Little World of Our Own, whose subject were Ulster Unionists involved in a paramilitary group, was described as an important production. Roddy noted that Gary Mitchell, the playwright who wrote In a Little World of Our Own, was Protestant while Frank McGuinness, the playwright who wrote Observe the Sons of Ulster Marching Towards the Somme, was a Catholic.

In 2004 and again in 2014, he acted in the controversial play Defender of the Faith by Stuart Carolan, set in 1986 on an isolated farm in County Armagh, where a family that supports the Provisional Irish Republican Army (IRA) suspects that one of them might be an informer for the Crown.

== Television and film work ==
Through primarily a theatre actor working throughout Ireland, Roddy is best known internationally for work in film and television, having appeared in many films and television episodes. One of his best known roles on the screen is also one of his briefest, as the assassin who tried to kill Bran Stark in The Kingsroad episode of Game of Thrones.

In 2018, he starred in Séamus, a short film written and directed by the American filmmaker Gursimran Sandhu.

== Accolades ==
Roddy was described by The Irish Times theatre critic Fintan O'Toole as "surely the finest Irish actor of his generation".

Other accolades include:

- ?: Winner, ESB / Irish Times Award for best supporting actor, for In a Little World of Our Own
- 2004: Nominated, ESB/Irish Times Theatre Awards for best actor, for The Weir

== Personal life ==
Roddy's younger brother and sister, Andrew and Ethna became actors before he did.

== Filmography ==
- Screenplay (1991)
- Between the Lines (1993)
- Screen Two (1994)
- Circles of Deceit (1996)
- The Ruth Rendell Mysteries (1997)
- Love and Rage (1998)
- Best (2000)
- The Escapist (2002)
- Pulling Moves (2003)
- Boy Eats Girl (2005)
- Murphy's Law (2006)
- Middletown (2006)
- Hunger (2008)
- Summer of the Flying Saucer (2008)
- Ditching (2009)
- Cherrybomb (2009)
- Five Minutes of Heaven (2009)
- 10 Minute Tales (2009)
- Jack Taylor (2010)
- Mount Analogue (2010)
- Game of Thrones (2011)
- Grabbers (2012)
- Jump (2012)
- Cowboys and Dissidents (2012)
- The Good Man (2012)
- Dani's Castle (2013)
- Ripper Street (2013)
- The Light of My Eyes (2014)
- Robot Overlords (2014)
- I Am Belfast (2015) - Narrator
- Today (2015)
- Rebellion (2016)
- Michael Inside (2017)
- Float Like a Butterfly (2018)
- Don't Go (2018)
- The Devil's Doorway (2018)
- Séamus (2018)
- End of Sentence (2019)
- God's Creatures (2022)
- That They May Face the Rising Sun (2023)
- Moon Under Water (2025)
