= Zoo (2017 film) =

- Theatrical release poster
- Directed by: Colin McIvor
- Written by: Colin McIvor
- Produced by: Katy Jackson; Jacqueline Kerrin; John Leslie; Thomas Vencelides; Dominic Wright
- Starring: Art Parkinson; Dame Penelope Wilton; Toby Jones; Ian O'Reilly; Ian McElhinney; Amy Huberman; Glen Nee; Damian O'Hare
- Cinematography: Damien Elliott
- Edited by: Chris Gill; Brian Philip Davis
- Music by: Mark Thomas
- Production companies: Piccadilly Pictures; Northern Ireland Screen; Yellowmoon; Metro International; Ripple World Pictures; Wee Buns Films
- Distributed by: Entertainment One
- Release dates: 14 October 2017 (Chicago International Film Festival); 29 June 2018 (United Kingdom)
- Running time: 97 minutes
- Countries: United Kingdom; Republic of Ireland
- Language: English
- Box office: $231,719

Zoo is a 2017 historical war family drama film directed and written by Colin McIvor. The film, based on a true story, stars Dame Penelope Wilton, Art Parkinson, Toby Jones, Ian O'Reilly, Ian McElhinney, Amy Huberman, and Damian O'Hare. As the Belfast Blitz ravages the city, a lonely widow, and an awkward teenager with friends take an elephant named Buster from the city zoo, and hide it in the widow's terraced house back yard.

== Cast ==
- Art Parkinson as Tom Hall
- Penelope Wilton as Denise Austin
- Toby Jones as Security Guard Charlie
- Ian McElhinney as Mr Shawcross
- Amy Huberman as Emily Hall
- Ian O'Reilly as Pete
- Emily Flain as Jane Berry
- James Stockdale as Mickey
- Stephen Hagan as Jake McClune
- Glen Nee as Vernon
- Damian O'Hare as George Hall
- Shane McCaffrey as Officer Burland

== Production ==
Principal photography on the film began in September 2016 in Belfast. The film is loosely based on the story of Denise Weston Austin, Belfast Zoo's 'Elephant Angel'.

== Reception ==
On review aggregator website Rotten Tomatoes, the film holds an approval rating of 88%, based on 17 reviews, and an average rating of 7.2/10.
