= John Boyd (playwright) =

- Born: 1912; Belfast, Northern Ireland
- Died: 2002 (aged 89–90); Belfast, Northern Ireland
- Education: Royal Academical Institution, Queen's University Belfast, Trinity College, Dublin
- Occupations: Playwright, radio producer, teacher
- Employer(s): BBC, Lyric Theatre, Belfast
- Known for: Writing the first play set during Northern Ireland's Troubles
- Notable work: The Flats (play)

John Boyd (1912–2002) was a Northern Irish teacher, radio producer, and playwright. Noted for his ability to reproduce the speech of working class Belfast, he has been described as Northern Ireland's most important playwright, and encouraged the careers of other writers including Seamus Heaney and Stewart Parker.

== Early life and education ==
John Boyd was born 19 July 1912 in a working class area of east Belfast. He was the first child of three born to Robert Boyd, a steam engine fireman and later a train driver, and Jane Boyd (née Leeman). Boyd attended Mountpottinger elementary school, and subsequently won a scholarship to the Royal Belfast Academical Institution. He later gained another scholarship, allowing him to attend Queen's University Belfast. A young Boyd was introduced by an uncle and aunt to theatre and the literature of the labour movement, which remained keystones of his life. On graduating, he worked for a short time in a factory in England, as a private tutor, and then in an educational establishment for unemployed youths in Belfast. Following his marriage, on 11 November 1939, to Elizabeth McCune (with whom he would have two sons and a daughter), he took a teaching job in Lisburn Intermediate School.

Boyd later completed an extramural B.Litt. through Trinity College Dublin, with a thesis on the work of Forrest Reid, a Belfast writer whose Ulster literature inspired him.

== Career ==
During the early 1940s, Boyd published a number of articles anonymously in the socialist and nationalist paper the Irish Democrat. In 1943, he co-founded a literary journal, Lagan, with his friend and fellow writer Sam Hanna Bell. Published between 1943 and 1946, the journal hoped to foster the literature and culture of Northern Ireland. Boyd became a central figure in Belfast's cultural life, with a circle which included Roy McFadden, W. R. Rodgers, Joseph Tomelty, Michael McLaverty, Frank O’Connor, and St John Ervine.

When, following the end of World War 2, the BBC reintroduced regional broadcasting, Boyd became a talks producer in its Belfast studios. While at the BBC, Boyd found it difficult to produce much of his own literary work, and was unable to openly take part in any political activity. In spite of this, he enjoyed his time at the BBC (where he spend over two decades), and networked widely with Northern Ireland's cultural and political figures. During these years, he contributed a chapter on 'Ulster Prose' for The Arts in Ulster (edited by Bell, John Hewitt, and Nesca Robb), and in 1954 adapted St John Ervine's Mrs Martin's Man for the stage.

From the late 1960s Boyd also produced some television programmes, but retired from the BBC at the age of 60 in 1972, intending to concentrate on his literary career. From 1971, he edited the Lyric Theatre's literary journal Threshold, as well as helping to shape the theatre's output as their literary adviser. In this role, he encouraged up-and-coming dramatists like Stewart Parker. A number of Boyd's plays were produced in the Lyric Theatre, including The Farm (1972), Guests (1974), The Street (1977), Facing North (1979), Speranza's Boy (1982), Summer Class (1986), and Round the Big Clock (1992).

With his 1971 play, The Troubles, Boyd is considered to have contributed to the development of a dramatic genre: plays about The Troubles. The Flats was the first play to be set during this period of Northern Ireland's history, and was enormously popular, performed by the Lyric Players in March 1971; and in Derry's Little Theatre and Dublin's Project Theatre in 1973. It was aired on television in 1975, and performed in the Irish language in Dublin in 1980.

Boyd also wrote two volumes of autobiography and a posthumously published novel, Across the Bitter Sea.

== Death and legacy ==
John Boyd died in Belfast in July 2002, aged nearly 90. During his life, he had accumulated a large personal archive, much of which has been of great interest to literary and cultural historians. Notable items include a rare (possibly singular) recording of Frank O'Connor talking about his childhood, and an edition of James Joyce's Ulysses, which Boyd had smuggled into Ireland to avoid its seizure by Irish customs officials as an obscene publication.

Today, John Boyd is acknowledged as an influential Northern Irish figure, whose friendships and support transcended boundaries and 'locally constructed boxes'. He is perhaps best remembered for his autobiographical writings. Boyd's archive today forms part of the Northern Ireland Literary Archive, held by the Linen Hall Library, which describes him as "a key figure in the development of a literary culture in Northern Ireland."

A commemorative gathering was held for Boyd at the Lyric Theatre in 2003. In 2008, an exhibition about Boyd's life and work was held at the Linen Hall Library.

== Works ==
=== Plays ===
- The Flats (1974)
- Collected Plays, 2 vols. (1981; 1982)

=== Autobiography ===
- Out of My Class (1985)
- The Middle of My Journey (1990)

=== Novel ===
- Across the Bitter Sea (2006)
