= Anya's Bell =

- Written by: David Alexander
- Directed by: Tom McLoughlin
- Starring: Della Reese; Mason Gamble; Kelly Rowan; Tom Cavanagh
- Music by: Lee Holdridge
- Country of origin: United States
- Original language: English

Production
- Producers: Karen Danaher-Dorr; Graham Ludlow; Franklin Lett; Sam Okun
- Cinematography: Gordon Lonsdale
- Editor: Charles Bornstein
- Running time: 97 minutes
- Production companies: Left/Reese International Productions; Erratic Entertainment; Universal Television

Original release
- Network: CBS
- Release: October 31, 1999

Anya's Bell is a television film that aired on CBS on October 31, 1999, starring Della Reese as Anya Herpick.

== Plot ==
In 1949, Anya is a blind woman who was always taken care of by her mother. Anya copes with her loneliness by collecting bells, a situation which becomes worse when her mother dies. Now middle-aged and alone, Anya befriends a 12-year-old delivery boy, Scott Rhymes. Scott is considered "slow", though later it is revealed that he is dyslexic (a disorder not commonly understood at that time). Anya teaches him to read Braille, which Scott rapidly learns, and the two become close friends.

== Cast ==
- Della Reese as Anya Herpick
- Mason Gamble as Scott Rhymes
- Kelly Rowan as Jeanne Rhymes
- Tom Cavanagh as Patrick Birmingham

== Awards ==
- 2000 Young Artist Award: Best Performance in a TV Movie or Pilot: Leading Young Actor - Mason Gamble (won)
- 2000 Humanitas Prize (nominated)

== See also ==
- List of artistic depictions of dyslexia
