= The Lovers (2023 TV series) =

British television series

- Genre: Romantic comedy
- Written by: David Ireland
- Directed by: Justin Martin
- Starring: Johnny Flynn; Roisin Gallagher
- Country of origin: United Kingdom
- Original language: English
- No. of series: 1
- No. of episodes: 6

Production
- Executive producers: Roanna Benn; Rebecca de Souza; Liz Lewin; Manpreet Dosanjh; Hannah Pescod
- Producer: Chris Martin
- Running time: 54 minutes
- Production companies: Drama Republic; Sky Studios

Original release
- Network: Sky Atlantic
- Release: 7 September – 12 October 2023

The Lovers is a British romantic comedy television series starring Johnny Flynn and Roisin Gallagher. It is written by David Ireland and directed by Justin Martin and premiered on 7 September 2023 on Sky Atlantic.

== Synopsis ==
A foul-mouthed supermarket worker begins an unexpected relationship with a political television broadcaster.

== Cast and characters ==
- Johnny Flynn as Seamus
- Roisin Gallagher as Janet
- Alice Eve as Frankie
- Evelyn Miller as Ndidi
- Conleth Hill as Philip
- Simon Paisley Day as Tim
- Jenn Murray as Gemma
- Sunetra Sarker as Nisha Anand

== Episodes ==
No. in series	Title	Directed by	Written by	Original release date
1	"Episode 1"	Justin Martin	David Ireland	7 September 2023
2	"Episode 2"	Justin Martin	David Ireland	14 September 2023
3	"Episode 3"	Justin Martin	David Ireland	21 September 2023
4	"Episode 4"	Justin Martin	David Ireland	28 September 2023
5	"Episode 5"	Justin Martin	David Ireland	5 October 2023
6	"Episode 6"	Justin Martin	David Ireland	12 October 2023

== Production ==
The project, produced by Drama Republic, in association with Sky Studios for Sky Atlantic, was announced in June 2022. AMC Network joined the production through Sundance Now in August 2022 for North American rights with NBCUniversal Global Distribution selling the show internationally. The series is written by David Ireland and directed by Justin Martin.

Johnny Flynn and Roisin Gallagher were announced as part of the cast in June 2022 In July 2022, Alice Eve was added to the cast. Game of Thrones star Conleth Hill was also due to star in the series as Janet's supermarket boss.

Filming took place in Belfast in the summer of 2022. Flynn said his character was a "younger Andrew Marr or Robert Peston".

== Release ==
The series premiered on 7 September 2023 on Sky Atlantic and Now.

== Reception ==
In March 2024, Gallagher was nominated in the Female Performance in a Comedy Programme category at the 2024 British Academy Television Awards, for her role in the series.
