= Michael Patrick (actor) =

Irish actor and writer (1991–2026)

- Born: Michael Campbell; 6 September 1990; Belfast, Northern Ireland
- Died: 7 April 2026 (aged 35)
- Education: Churchill College University of Cambridge; Mountview Academy of Theatre Arts
- Occupations: Actor, writer
- Known for: My Left Nut; The Tragedy of Richard III

Michael Patrick (born Michael Campbell; 6 September 1990 – 7 April 2026) was an Irish actor and writer from Belfast, Northern Ireland. He was best known for co-writing the stage play and BBC adaptation My Left Nut and stage play My Right Foot with Oisín Kearney, and for creating and starring in The Tragedy of Richard III at the Lyric Theatre in 2024. In that production, he became the first disabled actor to play Shakespeare's Richard III on the island of Ireland.

Patrick also appeared with the Royal Shakespeare Company and the Abbey Theatre, and in television series including Game of Thrones, This Town, and Blue Lights.

== Early life and education ==
Born Michael Patrick Thomas Campbell in Belfast, Northern Ireland, in 1990. He studied Natural Sciences at Churchill College, University of Cambridge, specializing in Physics. At Cambridge, he became a member of the Cambridge Footlights, where he was a contemporary of George Fouracres and Pierre Novellie. Together with Oisín Kearney, he ran the University's Irish Society, which he described as: "“An excuse to use university money to buy Guinness". He later trained at the Mountview Academy of Theatre Arts in London.

== Career ==
Patrick worked frequently with writer and director Oisín Kearney. Their first professional collaboration, My Left Nut, premiered at the Dublin Fringe Festival in 2017. Patrick wrote and performed the one-man play, which was based on his teenage years and later won a Summerhall Lustrum Award at the Edinburgh Festival Fringe. In 2020, Patrick and Kearney adapted the work into a three-part BBC Three comedy-drama series.

Other theatrical works by Patrick and Kearney included The Alternative, winner of Fishamble's A Play For Ireland initiative, and The Border Game, which first played at the Lyric Theatre as part of the Belfast International Arts Festival in 2021 before touring Ireland in 2022.

In 2024, Patrick and Kearney staged The Tragedy of Richard III at the Lyric Theatre, adapting Shakespeare's play around Patrick's own experience of living with motor neurone disease. Patrick starred in the title role, and in 2025 he received the Judges' Award at The Stage Awards for the production. Later that year he followed it with My Right Foot, a one-person play about living with the disease.

== Personal life and death ==
In February 2023, Patrick announced that he had been diagnosed with motor neuron disease, the same illness that had killed his father when Patrick was young. He died at the Northern Ireland Hospice on 7 April 2026, at the age of 35.

== Selected works ==
- My Left Nut (2017 stage play; 2020 television adaptation)
- The Alternative (2019)
- The Border Game (2021)
- The Tragedy of Richard III (2024)
- My Right Foot (2025)
