= The Call of the Wild: Dog of the Yukon =

- Directed by: Peter Svatek
- Written by: Graham Ludlow
- Based on: The Call of the Wild; 1903 novel by Jack London
- Produced by: Julie Allan; Pieter Kroonenburg
- Starring: Rutger Hauer
- Narrated by: Richard Dreyfuss
- Cinematography: Sylvain Brault
- Edited by: Denis Papillon
- Music by: Alan Reeves
- Release date: June 22, 1997
- Running time: 91 minutes
- Language: English

The Call of the Wild: Dog of the Yukon is a 1997 Canadian film. The screenplay by Graham Ludlow is based on Jack London's classic 1903 novel The Call of the Wild, and is narrated by Richard Dreyfuss and stars Rutger Hauer.

It was filmed in Quebec, Canada and premiered in the United States as a television movie on June 22, 1997.

The main character Buck was portrayed by three Leonberger dog "actors" (one female, and two males). In the novel, Buck is identified as a half-Saint Bernard and half-Scottish shepherd dog.

== Plot ==
Buck is a St. Bernard/Scotch collie hybrid dog living the easy life on Judge Miller's estate in Santa Clara, California—unaware that the fall-1897 Klondike Gold Rush has created a demand for sled dogs. This demand results in Judge Miller's gardener, Manuel, stealing Buck away and selling him to a man who sends him to Seattle—where another man, wearing a red sweater, beats the headstrong Buck into submission with a club—the first introduction into "primitive law". Buck is then sold to Perrault, a dispatch-courier for the Canadian government—who, with his partner, dog-musher Francois, takes him on a boat to Dyea, Alaska.

There, Buck, new to the snowy Northland, sees "the law of club and fang": Curly, another Southland dog, is brought down by a husky, then a group of huskies mercilessly finish her off. Buck then is strapped into dog-team traces and taught to pull a sled—a humiliating experience at first, but something he learns to enjoy. He comes to know the brutal and experienced lead-dog Spitz—and they develop a rivalry for mastery. Among the many lessons of the harsh Northland he learns, learning how to steal without being caught is the "first sign" that he's capable of adapting to the precarious environment. Perrault is a daring man who works hard to drive the team safely over treacherous ice; Francois is a stern but fair dog-driver who even makes moccasins for Buck's as-yet soft feet from a pair of his own. The team travels the "Yukon Trail" up to Dawson City in Canada's Yukon territory—where a gold prospector, later revealed to be John Thornton, notices him.

On the way back to Dyea, a chase between the dogs and a hare leads to the ultimate death-match between Buck and Spitz—who severely wounds Buck before Buck determines how to effectively strike back and kill Spitz. With Spitz gone, Buck prepares to assume the lead-dog position, but Francois attempts to place the half-blind but reliable Sol-leks in the spot. Buck contests that—and when Perrault and Francois can't get Buck to comply, even with clubs thrown, they give him the position; Buck then proves to be an even more reliable leader than Spitz. Perrault, already ahead of the trail record and determined to beat it, slowly works the dogs down. When wheel-dog Dave can no longer pull the sled, and won't run free alongside to get back his strength, the men decide to euthanize him—with Perrault leading the team ahead before Francois' shot is heard.

When they return to Dyea, the dogs——too worn out to work for the men anymore—are sold. Francois embraces them—especially Buck—a final time, while Perrault tells the new owners—Hal, his sister Mercedes, and her husband Charles, a trio of inept Southland prospectors—that the dogs need a rest. But the rash, impatient Hal wants to head to Dawson immediately—ignoring the onlookers' advice about lightening the load and ditching the tent until after the dogs pull the sled, and it tips over and spills. With a smaller load, the team starts out—with four of Mercedes' dogs from the Southland added, which ultimately means too many dogs to feed over the long trek.

The overworked and starving dogs start dying off; when the good-natured Billie falls dead in his tracks, Hal—all Southland gentility gone—cuts him out of the traces and leaves his corpse on the snow. The spring thaw leaves them increasingly without crossing places on the river; when they pull into John Thornton's camp at White River, he advises them to lay over until the fall. Hal instead orders Buck to lead the sled across the ice, but Buck, sensing "impending doom", refuses to get up, even under several blows of the club. John Thornton pushes back Hal, saying, "If you strike that dog again, I'll kill you", and cuts Buck loose. The trio leads the remaining dogs on; after a quarter mile, the ice gives way under the sled—killing dogs and humans alike.

Buck finds the nurturing John Thornton to be the "ideal master"—experiencing "love" for the first time;—he nevertheless grows wilder and more tempted by the forest—with only Thornton holding him to civilization. He later repays his live-saving master when John and his partners Hans and Pete are prospecting for gold and Thornton is suddenly swept into the harsh river current—leading to a daring rescue by Buck with Hans and Pete. Later, in Dawson, John Thornton pays off his debts by betting that Buck can single-handedly pull half a ton of flour on an ice-stuck sled 100 yards—which Buck amazingly does. Buck and Thornton then head off into the wilderness in search of a Lost Cabin full of gold.

Before they can find the legendary cabin, they find a used gold mine and decide to go no further. While John pans for gold, Buck increasingly spends more and more time in the forest, hearing "the call of the wild". During a long time away, Buck kills a bear and befriends a wolf; remembering John Thornton, he returns to his master, only to set out again later. When John Thornton finally finds gold, he is slain by a Yeehat Native American warrior—who is then slain by Buck, who's arrived a little too late. Mourning his master, he hears the call again; this time, with "the last tie" to mankind broken, he obeys, becoming a wild dog leading a pack of wolves. The Yeehats subsequently tell of a "Ghost Dog" who leads the wolf-pack—terrorizing them, and ensuring "there is one valley they never enter." This dog "sings the song of the younger world, which is the song of the pack."

== Cast ==
- Vasko, Geesa, and Gustav as Buck
- Rutger Hauer as John Thornton
- Luc Morissette as M. Perrault
- Robert Pierre Côté as Francoise
- Charles Edwin Powell as Hal
- Bronwen Booth as Mercedes
- Burke Lawrence as Charles
- Pinceau as Curly
- Kino as Spitz
- Dave the Dog as Himself
- Pirate as Billie
- Sun as Sol-leks
- Jack, Rocky, Andy, and Dixie as Mercedes' Dogs
- Raymond Ducasse as Judge Miller
- Eric Hoziel as Manuel
- John Dunn-Hill as Hans
- Jack Langedijk as Pete
- John Novak as Mr. Matthewson
- Barry Blake as The Man In The Red Sweater
- Eric Cabana as Yeehat Warrior
- Lynne Adams as Maggie
- Michael Shanks as Gambler 1
- Mike Kanentakeron as Yeehat Story Teller
- Bernard Ranger as Government Clerk
- Steve Adams as Mr. Kerns
- Deano Clavet as Baggage Man
- Howard Rosenstein as Savvy Prospector 1
- Michel Perron as Savvy Prospector 2
- Shakespeare as Producer's Dog

== Reception ==
The Hollywood Reporter gave it a positive review in 1997, and said it was "a pleasant surprise. Much more faithful to Jack London's 1903 classic than the two Hollywood versions." The New York Post claimed in June 1997 that Ludlow's adaptation was the "best version yet of Jack London's classic story of survival." In contrast, TVGuide.com said: "The umpteenth dramatization of Jack London's primordial sled-dog novel has some intriguing casting choices, but doesn't do much to lead the pack." In a February 2020 review of the Harrison Ford film The Call of the Wild, the Boston Herald called this earlier film a "not-bad 1997 TV movie version of the novel."

== DVD release ==
The film has been released on DVD in Region 0, PAL format.
