= Graham Ludlow =

Canadian actor

- Ludlow in 2011
- Born: England
- Education: Magee Secondary School
- Occupations: Actor, executive, screenwriter, producer

Graham Ludlow is a Canadian actor, executive, screenwriter and producer. Ludlow was born in England but grew up in Vancouver, British Columbia. He graduated from Magee Secondary School.

== Career ==
=== Acting ===
His acting roles include the films Welcome to 18 (1986) and Thunder Run (1986).

=== Writer ===
Ludlow wrote the film The Call of the Wild: Dog of the Yukon (1997), starring Rutger Hauer and narrated by Richard Dreyfuss. The Hollywood Reporter said that it was, "... a pleasant surprise. Much more faithful to Jack London's 1903 classic than the two Hollywood versions." The New York Post claimed Ludlow's adaptation was the "best version yet of Jack London's classic story of survival." Ludlow also wrote the television movie Storm Cell (2008).

=== Producer ===
Ludlow was a producer of the action film The Condemned (2007). He was executive producer of the television film Anya's Bell (1999), which was nominated for a Humanitas Prize in 2000, and won the 2000 Young Artist Award for Best Performance in a TV Movie. He executive produced Eight Days to Live (2006), which was nominated for a Gemini Award for Best TV Movie. Broadcast in Canada by CTV, Eight Days To Live became CTV's highest rated TV movie.

Ludlow was also executive producer of In God's Country (film) (2007), which won the 2008 CFTPA Indie Award for Best TV Movie and was nominated for a Gemini Award for Best TV Movie; The Good Times are Killing Me (2009), another Gemini Award nominee for Best TV Movie; and She Drives Me Crazy (2007), which was nominated and then won the Gemini Award for Best TV Movie in 2010.

Ludlow wrote the screenplay for and is an executive producer of The Riverbank (2012). The film was the Opening Night Gala Presentation at the 24th edition of Cinéfest Sudbury International Film Festival on September 15, 2012.

Ludlow produced and wrote the screenplay for the indie film Naked Dragon (2014).

Ludlow was a producer of the award-winningBaroness von Sketch Show (2016).

In 2021, Incendo appointed Ludlow to the role of production and development executive, Canada. Some of the titles he has produced at Incendo include Terror Train (2022), Marry F*** Kill (2022), The Amityville Curse (2023) and Guess Who (2024). He is also an Executive Producer of the series Clean Sweep (2023) and the Roku original movies Jingle Bell Love (2024), Jingle Bell Wedding (2025), and Merry Little Mystery (2025).

Ludlow is currently an Executive Producer of the recently announced comedy series Meatballs, a modern adaptation of the original film, for Crave.

== Filmography ==
=== Actor ===
- 1983 The Young and the Restless (TV series) – Episode dated 1 July 1983: Messenger
- 1984 Santa Barbara (TV series) – Episode #1.43, 40, and 38: Howard Reiter
- 1986 Thunder Run: Mike
- 1986 Welcome to 18: Pipes
- 1987 The Judge (TV series) – Episode dated 22 July 1987: Phillip Sordo
- 1988 Superior Court (TV series) – Episode dated 7 April 1988: Sean Maclean

=== Producer ===
- 1999 Anya's Bell (TV movie) (executive producer)
- 2006 Eight Days to Live (TV movie) (executive producer)
- 2007 She Drives Me Crazy (TV movie) (executive producer)
- 2007 The Condemned (executive producer)
- 2007 In God's Country (film) (TV movie) (executive producer)
- 2009 The Good Times Are Killing Me (TV movie) (executive producer)
- 2010 Tangled (TV movie) (executive producer)
- 2012 The Riverbank (executive producer)
- 2014 Child Star (TV series) (executive producer)
- 2014 Naked Dragon (film) (producer)
- 2016 Baroness von Sketch Show (TV series) (supervising producer)
- 2019 Stand! (film) (executive producer)
- 2021 The Secret Sauce (TV movie) (supervising producer)
- 2021 Farmer Seeking Love (TV movie) (supervising producer)
- 2021 Destination Love (TV movie) (supervising producer)
- 2021 Love and Penguins (TV movie) (supervising producer)
- 2022 Terror Train (TV movie) (executive producer / producer)
- 2022 Terror Train 2 (TV movie) (executive producer / producer)
- 2023 Marry F*** Kill (TV movie) (executive producer / producer)
- 2023 The Amityville Curse (TV movie) (executive producer / producer)
- 2023 Clean Sweep (TV series) (executive producer)
- 2024 Guess Who (TV movie) (executive producer / producer)
- 2024 Jingle Bell Love (TV movie) (executive producer / producer)
- 2025 Merry Little Mystery (TV movie) (executive producer / producer)
- 2025 Jingle Bell Wedding (TV movie) (executive producer / producer)

=== Screenwriter ===
- 1997 The Call of the Wild: Dog of the Yukon (screenplay)
- 2008 Storm Cell (TV movie) (screenplay)
- 2012 The Riverbank (screenplay)
- 2014 Naked Dragon (screenplay)

== Published works ==
- Ludlow, Graham (March–April 2004). "So You Wrote a Great Screenplay: Now What?". Script Magazine. 10 (2). Final Draft, Inc.: 68.
