= Roisin Gallagher =

Irish actress (born 1987)

- Born: Róisín Alice Gallagher
- Education: Royal Scottish Academy of Music and Drama (BA)
- Years active: 2008–present
- Spouse: Craig Hutchison
- Children: 2

Róisín Alice Gallagher is an actress and playwright from Northern Ireland. She began her career in theatre. On television, she is known for her roles in the BritBox series The Dry (2022–2026), the Sky Atlantic series The Lovers (2023) and the Netflix series How to Get to Heaven from Belfast (2026). She has received IFTA and British Academy Television Award nominations.

== Early life ==
Gallagher is from Andersonstown, a suburb of West Belfast, Northern Ireland, and was born to father Daniel (died 2017) from County Tyrone and mother Pat. She was raised Catholic and has three older sisters and a younger brother.

Gallagher attended St Genevieve's High School. She graduated with a Bachelor of Arts in Acting from the Royal Scottish Academy of Music and Drama (now the Royal Conservatoire of Scotland). Gallagher lived in London after graduating from drama school but returned to Belfast as "It just wasn't my time. The work wasn't coming [yet]".

== Career ==
Gallagher made her television debut as Alicia Hodge in two 2009 episodes of the BBC One medical soap opera Doctors. Her early stage work includes The Bloody Chamber and The Wicked Lady in England, and Be My Baby and Sleep Eat Party in Belfast. She starred as the titular character in The Haunting of Helena Blunden at the Waterfront Hall. This was followed by Dockers and White Star of the North at the Lyric Theatre, Belfast. She would return to the Lyric for Weddins, Weeins and Wakes, Demented, Pentecost, Stitched Up, Little Red Riding Hood, Love or Money, Smiley, and Bah, Humbug!.

In 2012, Gallagher played Helena in A Midsummer Night's Dream at the Royal Lyceum Theatre in Edinburgh. The following year, she made her feature film debut in actor Paul Kennedy's 2013 directorial debut Made in Belfast. She played DC Emer Taylor in the BBC Two crime drama The Fall. At the Belfast Festival at Queen's, she appeared in Belfast by Moonlight and debuted the play The Holy Holy Bus, which she would return to. Her other stage work includes Playhouse Creatures in Lisburn.

Gallagher wrote her first play Natural Disaster to process her grief over losing her father in 2017. After starring in Abigail's Party at the MAC, Gallagher premiered her play there. She also returned to A Midsummer Night's Dream, this time playing Hermia at Queen's Hall in Newtownards, went on tour with Is That Too Hot?, and appeared in The Real Housewives of Norn Iron at the Grand Opera House. The following year, Gallagher returned to film in Nowhere Special.

In 2021, it was announced Gallagher would star in her first lead television role as Shiv Sheridan in the BritBox and RTÉ comedy-drama The Dry, which premiered in 2022. She also appeared in the horror film Mandrake and the television film St Mungo's. She also appears opposite Johnny Flynn in the Sky Atlantic series The Lovers.

== Personal life ==
Gallagher is married. The couple met in 2012 while Gallagher was in Edinburgh for A Midsummer Night's Dream. They have two sons. Regarding religion, Gallagher considers herself spiritual.

== Filmography ==
Key
†	Denotes works that have not yet been released

=== Film ===
Year	Title	Role	Notes
2012	Eyeline	Woman	Short film
2013	To Lose Control	Caroline Draper	Short film
2013	Made in Belfast	Charlene	
2020	Nowhere Special	Judy	
2021	A Phone Call	Her	Short film
2021	Just Johnny	Maria	Short film
2022	Mandrake	Grace	

=== Television ===
Year	Title	Role	Notes
2009	Doctors	Alicia Hodge	2 episodes
2014–2016	The Fall	DC Emer Taylor	2 episodes
2018	Come Home	Jess	Miniseries; 1 episode
2022	St Mungo's	Madeline McGurk	Television film
2022-2026	The Dry	Shiv Sheridan	Main role
2023	The Lovers	Janet	Main role
2025	Lazarus	Laura Hampton	Recurring role
2026	How to Get to Heaven from Belfast	Saoirse	8 episodes

== Stage ==
Year	Title	Role	Notes
2008	The Bloody Chamber	The Girl	Northern Stage, Newcastle upon Tyne
2009	Be My Baby	Mary Adams	Lyric Theatre, Belfast
2009	The Wicked Lady	Barbara	New Vic Theatre, Newcastle-under-Lyme
2009	Sleep Eat Party	Various	Old Museum Arts Centre, Belfast
2010	The Haunting of Helena Blunden	Helena	Waterfront Hall, Belfast
2011	Dockers	Theresa Graham	Lyric Theatre, Belfast
2012	White Star of the North	Evelyn Massey	Lyric Theatre, Belfast
2012	A Midsummer Night's Dream	Helena	Royal Lyceum Theatre, Edinburgh
2013	Weddins, Weeins and Wakes	Wendy	Lyric Theatre, Belfast
2013	Belfast by Moonlight	Susannah	Belfast Festival at Queen's
2014	Demented	Felicity	Lyric Theatre, Belfast
2014	Pentecost	Ruth	Lyric Theatre, Belfast
2014–2017	The Holy Holy Bus	Sally	Belfast Festival at Queen's / Waterfront Hall / Lyric Theatre
2015	Stitched Up	Kate McAllister	Lyric Theatre, Belfast
2015	Lally the Scut	Lally	The MAC, Belfast
2015	Lanciatore	Wife	Cathedral Quarter Arts Festival
2015	Playhouse Creatures	Mrs Marshall	Island Arts Centre, Lisburn
2015	Little Red Riding Hood	Rachel	Lyric Theatre, Belfast
2016	Love or Money	Eilish	Lyric Theatre, Belfast
2016	Smiley	Charlie	Lyric Theatre, Belfast
2018	The Man Who Fell to Pieces	Caroline	The MAC, Belfast
2018	Abigail's Party	Beverly	The MAC, Belfast
2018	Bah, Humbug!	Various	Lyric Theatre, Belfast
2019	Is That Too Hot?	Olive	Ireland tour
2019	Natural Disaster		Playwright; The MAC, Belfast
2019	A Midsummer Night's Dream	Hermia	Queen’s Hall, Newtownards
2019	The Real Housewives of Norn Iron	Cynthia	Grand Opera House, Belfast

== Awards and nominations ==
Year	Award	Category	Work	Result	Ref.
2023	Irish Film & Television Awards	Lead Actress – Drama	The Dry	Nominated	
2024	British Academy Television Awards	Best Female Comedy Performance	The Lovers	Nominated	
