= Dorothy Mills =

2008 Irish-French psychological thriller mystery film by Agnès Merlet

- Directed by: Agnès Merlet
- Written by: Juliette Sales; Agnes Merlet
- Produced by: Jérôme Lateur; Jean-Luc Ormières; James Flynn
- Starring: Carice van Houten; Jenn Murray; Ger Ryan; Gary Lewis; Rynagh O'Grady; Gavin O'Connor
- Cinematography: Giorgos Arvanitis
- Edited by: Monica Coleman
- Music by: Nathaniel Méchaly
- Distributed by: Dutch FilmWorks; Genius Products
- Release date: 6 August 2008
- Running time: 102 minutes
- Country: Ireland
- Language: English

Dorothy Mills, (also released as Dorothy), is a 2008 Irish psychological thriller mystery film directed by Agnès Merlet. Starring Carice van Houten and Jenn Murray, the film is about a psychiatrist assigned to work on the case of a disturbed young girl.

== Plot ==
The film follows Dorothy Mills, a young girl from a small Irish island who has been accused of trying to murder a baby while babysitting. She lives in an institution run by Eileen McMahon, a local, and has been assigned a psychiatrist from the mainland. The psychiatrist, Jane Morton, is in mourning for her son David, who died accidentally. During her care, Jane learns that Dorothy manifests different personalities: the childlike Mimi, a party girl named Mary, and a boy named Kurt, who warns of a "boss" personality named Duncan. To learn more about Dorothy Jane begins to talk to the locals, some of whom are helpful and others hostile. She manages to make friends with the local sheriff named Colin Garrivan, with whom she becomes close.

Throughout the course of her investigation and care, Jane learns that Duncan, Mary, and Kurt are the names of teenagers who died ten years earlier in an auto accident. She also begins to experience visions of her dead son David and is horrified when Dorothy begins to manifest his personality. Jane decides to leave the island with Dorothy but is stopped by Eileen, who accuses Jane of wanting to keep the girl's gifts to herself. She also mentions that Dorothy is the only way she can see Mary, revealing herself as the dead girl's mother. During the day's therapy, Dorothy relates that her mother worked as the morgue attendant for the dead teens and that she manifested the personality of Mimi to deal with her mother forcing her to kiss their dead bodies. This allows her to let go of Mimi. Much later Dorothy, under the control of Duncan, Mary, and Kurt, goes to Colin's home and taunts him until he commits suicide.

Jane and the locals discover the death and it is revealed that Dorothy has been acting as a medium for the dead teens' spirits. Duncan's spirit reveals the truth of what happened the night they died. That night he and Kurt had attended a party where they discovered Mary being raped by four of the locals. They were able to successfully stop the rape and escape in Duncan's car with Mary, only to die after they were run off the road by the men, revealed to be Colin, the abused baby's father, and two other villagers. This horrifies the villagers, who turn on the men. While trying to intervene, Jane is accidentally killed when she is pushed and hits her head on a rock.

The rapists are banished from the island with their families and the townspeople erase any trace that they existed. They also hide Jane's body in the lake and agree to tell the outside world that she left without word of her destination or plans. The film ends with Jane recounting the story to her husband, after which she moves on. Happy that she was able to help Jane, Dorothy smiles.

== Cast ==
- Carice van Houten as Jane Morton
- Jenn Murray as Dorothy Mills, Mimi
- David Wilmot as Sheriff Colin Garrivan
- Gary Lewis as Pastor Ross
- Ger Ryan as Eileen McMahon
- Rynagh O'Grady as Mrs. McCllellan

== Production ==
Filming for Dorothy Mills took place in Wicklow and Galway, Ireland during the summer of 2007. Carice van Houten was brought on to portray the titular character and the movie marked the first feature-length film directed by Agnes Merlet since her 1997 film Artemisia.

== Release ==
Dorothy Mills premiered in 2008 and was released to DVD the following year.

== Reception ==
Fangoria and DVD Talk both reviewed the film. DVD Talk noted that the movie "takes good advantage of Irish landscapes as well as color and hue to establish mood. Its storyline is interesting, although its development is overlong and its resolution is heavy-handed. Recommended, nonetheless." Fangoria felt that it was difficult to determine the film's genre, writing that "every time you think you can lock this film down to a recognizable singular subgenre, it shifts gears in a way that some critics dismissed as flighty, but for me was genuinely exciting. This indicates a real agility in the filmmaker's understanding of how genres work on a mechanical level." Exclaim! and Variety were more critical, with the former stating that it was "ultimately a pretty dull affair, unlikely to appeal to anyone".

=== Awards and nominations ===
The film received several nominations during the 2009 Irish Film and Television Awards. Actress Jenn Murray was nominated for Best Actress in a Lead Role. Ger Ryan was nominated for Best Actress in a Supporting Role in a Film. The film also received nominations for Best Hair & Make-Up and Best Production Design.
