= Lucy Chambers (actress) =

English actress

- Born: 2006 or 2007 (age 18–19); Otley, West Yorkshire, England
- Occupation: Actress
- Years active: 2021–present
- Television: Silverpoint; The Bay; Waterloo Road

Lucy Chambers (born 2006 or 2007) is an English actress. She made her television debut in 2021 in the television series Viewpoint, before going on to star in series including CBBC's Silverpoint and ITV1's The Bay. Since 2025, she has portrayed the role of Cat Guthrie in the BBC school drama series Waterloo Road.

== Life and career ==
Chambers is of English and Northern Irish descent, with her being based between Otley and Belfast. Whilst in year three, she participated in a school assembly, after which her mother was told she should enrol Chambers in an acting school. She then joined Articulate Agency in West Yorkshire when she was in primary school. She attended Prince Henry's Grammar School in Otley, where she appeared in their production of School of Rock. Whilst there, she balanced schoolwork with professional acting, including appearances in stage productions at the Leeds Playhouse. In 2021, Chambers appeared in her first professional acting role as Chloe Tuckman in the ITV1 procedural series Viewpoint. The following year, she made her film debut in the 2022 film Floodlights. Then in 2023, she was cast as Monika in the CBBC series Silverpoint whilst also studying for her GCSEs.

In 2024, Chambers joined the cast of ITV1's The Bay for its fifth series. She portrayed the main role of Poppy Richards. That same year, she recurred on the BBC series The Listeners. In 2025, she portrayed a young version of Alexandra Roach's character in the Prime Video series Lazarus, as well as recurring as Georgie Duck in Changing Ends, Alan Carr's ITVX series. Also in 2025, Chambers was cast in the regular role of Cat Guthrie in the BBC school drama series Waterloo Road. She made her debut in its fifteenth series. Speaking about Cat, she said: "Cat is an outgoing, confident young lady, who's not afraid of confrontation. She's out and proud, she identifies as a lesbian, but she won't let anybody label her. She is very eager to make friends when she joins Waterloo Road, but she also won't bat an eyelid if anybody's not interested in being her friend because she doesn't really care what people think of her and she's not self-conscious."

== Filmography ==
Year	Title	Role	Notes
2021	Viewpoint	Chloe Tuckman	Main role
2022	Floodlights	Lynda	Film
2023	Silverpoint	Monika	Main role
2024	The Bay	Poppy Richards	Main role
2024	The Listeners	Sophie	Recurring role
2025	Lazarus	Young Jenna	Recurring role
2025	Changing Ends	Georgie Duck	Recurring role
2025–present	Waterloo Road	Cat Guthrie	Main role
