= Jenn Murray =

Northern Irish actress

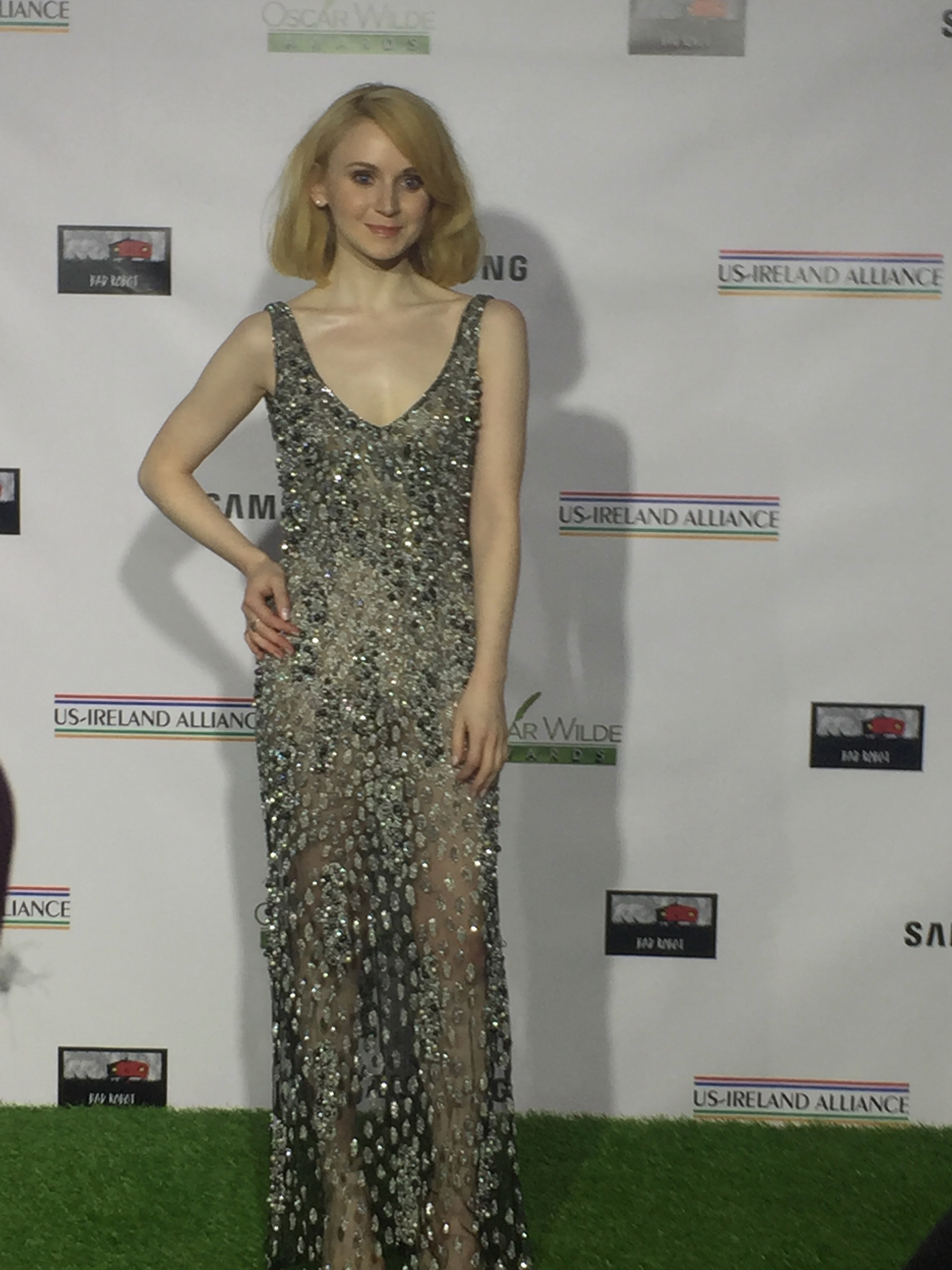
- Jenn Murray was awarded the 'Wilde Card Award' at the Oscar Wilde Awards in LA, 6 February 2020
- Born: Jenn Elizabeth Murray; 1 April 1986 (age 39); Belfast, Northern Ireland
- Occupation: Actress
- Years active: 2008–present

Jenn Elizabeth Murray (born 1 April 1986) is a Northern Irish actress. In 2009, she received an IFTA Award nomination for her role in the film Dorothy Mills (2008). Her other notable roles were in Brooklyn (2015), Fantastic Beasts and Where to Find Them (2016), and Maleficent: Mistress of Evil (2019).

In 2022, she was nominated for outstanding solo performance for the play A Girl is a Half-Formed Thing by Broadway World.

== Filmography ==
List of performances
Year	Title	Role	Notes
2008	The Clinic	Sorina	TV series, episode #6.2
2008	Dorothy Mills	Dorothy Mills (lead)	film debut
2009	Sunshower	Girl	
2009	The Bill	Ruby Deegan	TV series, episode: "On the Money"
2009	The Day of the Triffids	Susan	TV series, part 2
2010	Lewis	Charlotte Corwin	TV series, episode: "Falling Darkness"
2011	The Fades	Natalie	TV series, episodes 1-5
2012	Earthbound	Maria	
2013	Truckers	Michelle Truss	BBC1 TV series
2015	Angel		
2015	Brooklyn	Dolores	
2016	Love & Friendship	Lady Lucy Manwaring	
2016	Fantastic Beasts and Where to Find Them	Chastity Barebone	
2017	Star Wars: The Last Jedi	Lieutenant Lusica Stynnix	
2019	Maleficent: Mistress of Evil	Gerda	
2023	The Lovers	Gemma	
2025	Hope Street	Sasha Cookson	Series 5
2026	How to Get to Heaven from Belfast	Jamie	Netflix series
