= Most Favoured =

Most Favoured is a one-act play by David Ireland. It was first presented as a staged reading at the Edinburgh Festival from 14 to 26 August 2012 followed by a full production in 2013. It received its London premiere at the Soho Theatre from 11 December 2025 to 24 January 2026.

== Plot ==
Mike sits eating a bucket of KFC on a hotel bed during the Edinburgh Festival in the present-day while Mary showers. She comes into the room and thanks him for their one-night-stand the previous night and for it leaving her with a feeling of being loved that she has never felt before. He claims to be from a small town in Indiana but she is confused by his ignorance on the existence and nature of KFC and the meaning of the word "daft" and his being more intent on the food than what she is telling him.

She admits to him that she lied about being on contraceptives to convince him to have unprotected sex during the one-night-stand and that she has been having several such encounters over the last eight months, desperate to become a single mother before she reaches the age of 35. This does not anger him as she had expected, which leads to an argument in which he confesses that he is in fact the archangel Michael, come to announce to her that she will bear God's son.

He has been allowed out of heaven for forty-seven hours to bring Mary this message and is getting a train to London later that morning to see The Lion King. They did not make love the previous night, as angels are forbidden from making love to human women since their doing so triggered Noah's flood. Instead, her memory of that night is a dream after he met her while she was drunk in the bar, brought her back to her room and stayed beside her to look after her while slept.

She is angry, confused and conflicted about whether to believe him, especially when he reveals detailed knowledge of events during her schooldays. She wonders why God would have chosen her, as in her own eyes she falls far short of the Virgin Mary. Michael answers that Jesus came the first time as a lamb but is coming this time as a lion and therefore perhaps needs a fiercer mother. They reconcile and share a chaste kiss, he leaves and Mary sits puzzled for a few seconds before breaking into a wide smile.
