= Silverpoint (TV series) =

2022 science fiction television series

- Genre: Teen drama; Science fiction
- Created by: Lee Walters; Steven Andrew
- Written by: Lee Walters
- Starring: Oliver Cunliffe; Maiya Silveston; Katy Byrne; Krish Misra; Aoife Hughes
- Composer: Jessica Dannheisser
- Countries of origin: United Kingdom; France; Germany
- Original language: English
- No. of series: 2
- No. of episodes: 26

Production
- Executive producers: Steven Andrew; Cheryl Taylor; Lee Walters
- Producer: Trevor Klein
- Cinematography: Martyna Knitter; Ray Carlin
- Running time: 22 minutes
- Production companies: Zodiak Kids & Family Productions UK; ZDF Studios

Original release
- Network: CBBC; Canal+ ZDF; Hulu
- Release: 6 March 2022 – 17 May 2023

Silverpoint is a science fiction teen television series, which airs on CBBC, created by Lee Walters and Steven Andrew. The series follows a group of kids at an adventure camp who discover a strange artifact, while also drawn to the fate of four children who mysteriously disappeared twenty years ago. The first series was broadcast on CBBC from 6 March 2022. It was renewed for a second series which premiered on 17 May 2023 on iPlayer. In the United States, the series airs on BYUtv. All season 1 episodes were made available on the BYUtv App in February 2023 with season 2 following in September 2023.

== Premise ==
=== Season 1 ===
In 1997, four kids vanish in Silverpoint woods. Twenty-three years later, one boy aims to find out what really happened.

=== Season 2 ===
Dragonfly compete against three other groups in a series of challenges designed by a strange alien presence. Each task takes place in a very different alternate reality, and these sixteen kids must now use their wits and imaginations to win. If a group should lose, the alien artefacts will wipe their memories of the adventure.

== Cast ==
- Oliver Cunliffe as Louis
- Maiya Silveston as Kaz
- Katy Byrne as Meg
- Krish Misra as Glen
- Aoife Hughes as Bea

=== Recurring cast ===
- Scarlett Rayner as Alice
- Jordan Adene as Finn
- Claire Goose as Steph
- Liam McMahon as Daniel
- Fayez Bakhsh as Fisher

Series 2

- Skye McClenaghan as Maeve
- Emily Flain as Emma
- Ellen Taylor as Carrie
- Maariya Razzaq as Yasmin
- Noah Manzoor as Jay (Johar)
- Kalli Tant as Dev
- Florisa Kamara as Meena
- Charlie Banks as Kai
- Alis Waters as Isabel
- Lucy Chambers as Monika
- Keira Chansa as Faye
- Padraig (Podge) McCormack as Luka
- Frances Mayli McCann as Charlotte

== Episodes ==
=== Series 1 (2022) ===
No.	Title	Directed by	Written by	Original release date
1	"Dragonfly"	Dan Zeff	Lee Walters	6 March 2022
2	"Fermi's Paradox"	Dan Zeff	Lee Walters & Joanne Lau	13 March 2022
3	"43 Seconds"	Dan Zeff	Lee Walters	20 March 2022
4	"The Man in the Basement"	Dan Zeff	Lee Walters & Jenna Jovi	27 March 2022
5	"Today We Vanish"	Marek Losey	Vicki Lutas & Anna McCleery	3 April 2022
6	"Here There Be Monsters: Part 1"	Marek Losey	John Hickman	10 April 2022
7	"Here There Be Monsters: Part 2"	Marek Losey	Lee Walters	17 April 2022
8	"Whatever Happened to Meg?"	Marek Losey	Joanne Lau	24 April 2022
9	"This Is the Way Our World Ends"	Amy Coop	Lee Walters	1 May 2022
10	"Detour"	Amy Coop	John Hickman	8 May 2022
11	"The Silent Strong Type"	Amy Coop	Lee Walters	15 May 2022
12	"Someone Worth Saving"	Amy Coop	Lee Walters	22 May 2022
13	"Us Four Together Again"	Amy Coop	Lee Walters	29 May 2022

=== Series 2 (2023) ===
No.	Title	Directed by	Written by	Original release date
1	"Focus"	Amy Coop	Lee Walters	17 May 2023
2	"Little Sister"	Amy Coop	Lee Walters	17 May 2023
3	"Don't You Forget Me"	Amy Coop	Lee Walters	17 May 2023
4	"One Door Closes, Another One Opens"	Amy Coop	James Moran & Lee Walters	17 May 2023
5	"The Amnesia Girls"	Louise Ní Fhiannachta	Julie Dixon & Lee Walters	17 May 2023
6	"Day 1"	Amy Coop	Lee Walters	17 May 2023
7	"Lights Out"	Louise Ní Fhiannachta	Maryam Hamidi & Lee Walters	17 May 2023
8	"Special"	Aidan Largey	Matt Sinclair & Lee Walters	17 May 2023
9	"Don't Touch"	Aidan Largey	Temi Oh & Lee Walters	17 May 2023
10	"Headaches"	Aidan Largey	Julie Dixon & Lee Walters	17 May 2023
11	"The Things We Did"	Aidan Largey	Matt Sinclair & Lee Walters	17 May 2023
12	"Time to Save the World"	Louise Ní Fhiannachta	James Moran & Lee Walters	17 May 2023
13	"How I Wonder What You Are"	Aidan Largey	Lee Walters	17 May 2023

== Reception ==
Silverpoint received positive reviews.

Joly Herman of Common Sense Media rates the show three stars out of five, saying, "Mild, to-the-point, action-packed and mysterious, this show engages while avoiding disturbing or violent territory." She also said that "it's not the strongest, most complex show out there, but it will appeal to tweens or younger teens who want to watch Stranger Things but are too young or too skittish to do so."

=== Awards ===
Silverpoint was nominated for two BAFTAs, a Kidscreen Award for Best Live-Action Series, and won an RTS NI Award for Children and Animation.
