= Coldwater (TV series) =

British television series

- Screenplay by: David Ireland
- Starring: Andrew Lincoln; Eve Myles; Ewen Bremner; Indira Varma
- Composers: Thomas Reilly; Roderick Hart
- Country of origin: United Kingdom
- Original language: English
- No. of series: 1
- No. of episodes: 6

Production
- Executive producers: Chris Fry; Alice Tyler; Lydia Hampson; Jane Featherstone
- Producers: David Ireland; Andrew Lincoln; Brian Coffey
- Production company: Sister

Original release
- Network: ITV
- Release: 14 September – 29 September 2025

Coldwater (initially announced as Cold Water) is a 2025 British television series for ITV, written by David Ireland and starring Andrew Lincoln, Ewen Bremner, Indira Varma, and Eve Myles.

== Plot summary ==
John, a middle-aged man struggling with an identity crisis after freezing up during a violent incident at a London playground, uproots his wife, Fiona, and their children to start fresh in the quiet Scottish village of Coldwater. John dreams of peace and stability, while Fiona sees the move as a chance to rebuild their marriage and write a memoir about her career as a successful restaurateur. Almost immediately, they are drawn into the orbit of their neighbour Tommy, a charismatic and seemingly devout man married to the local minister, Rebecca. Tommy plays the role of the perfect husband, father, and village leader, presiding over a men's book group and presenting himself as a man of faith. John is both impressed and fascinated by him, but Fiona mistrusts him from the start. Her instincts prove sharper than John's, as his desire for companionship blinds him to Tommy's sinister nature.

As time passes, Tommy's charm begins to give way to troubling signs. The family's cat is found dead, neighbours whisper about John being involved in violent deaths, and evidence begins to surface that Tommy is framing John. Tommy manipulates the villagers, spreads rumours, and even convinces his own children to doubt outsiders. Buried family trauma is revealed: Tommy's childhood was shaped by abuse, animal torture, and a father who normalised cruelty, leaving him twisted and incapable of empathy. He collects “trophies” from victims such as jewellery, trinkets, and the collar of John's cat, hiding them in boxes in his garage. This hidden pathology turns the idyllic village into a trap. John's family becomes a target, Fiona is terrified, and the neighbours grow hostile as paranoia spreads. John finally realises that Tommy is the real killer linked to the deaths of Angus, Nathan, and even long-vanished victims like Suzie Bissett. Tommy's obsession with John also deepens, as he projects his own violent instincts onto him, trying to draw him into complicity.

The story reaches its breaking point when Tommy kidnaps John, threatens Fiona and the children, and demands that John either join him or prove his loyalty through violence. He confesses to killing Nathan, the cat Harlequin, and others, boasting that John is “just like him.” But John rejects this claim, telling Tommy he is not a killer and not his boy. A struggle ends with John being shot. The truth comes out, clearing John's name but leaving the community shaken that they had lived beside a serial killer hidden in plain sight. In the aftermath, Fiona and John cling to survival and try to restore trust in each other. John reads the story of Jonah swallowed by the great fish, symbolising how he was dragged into darkness but spat back out alive.

== Cast ==
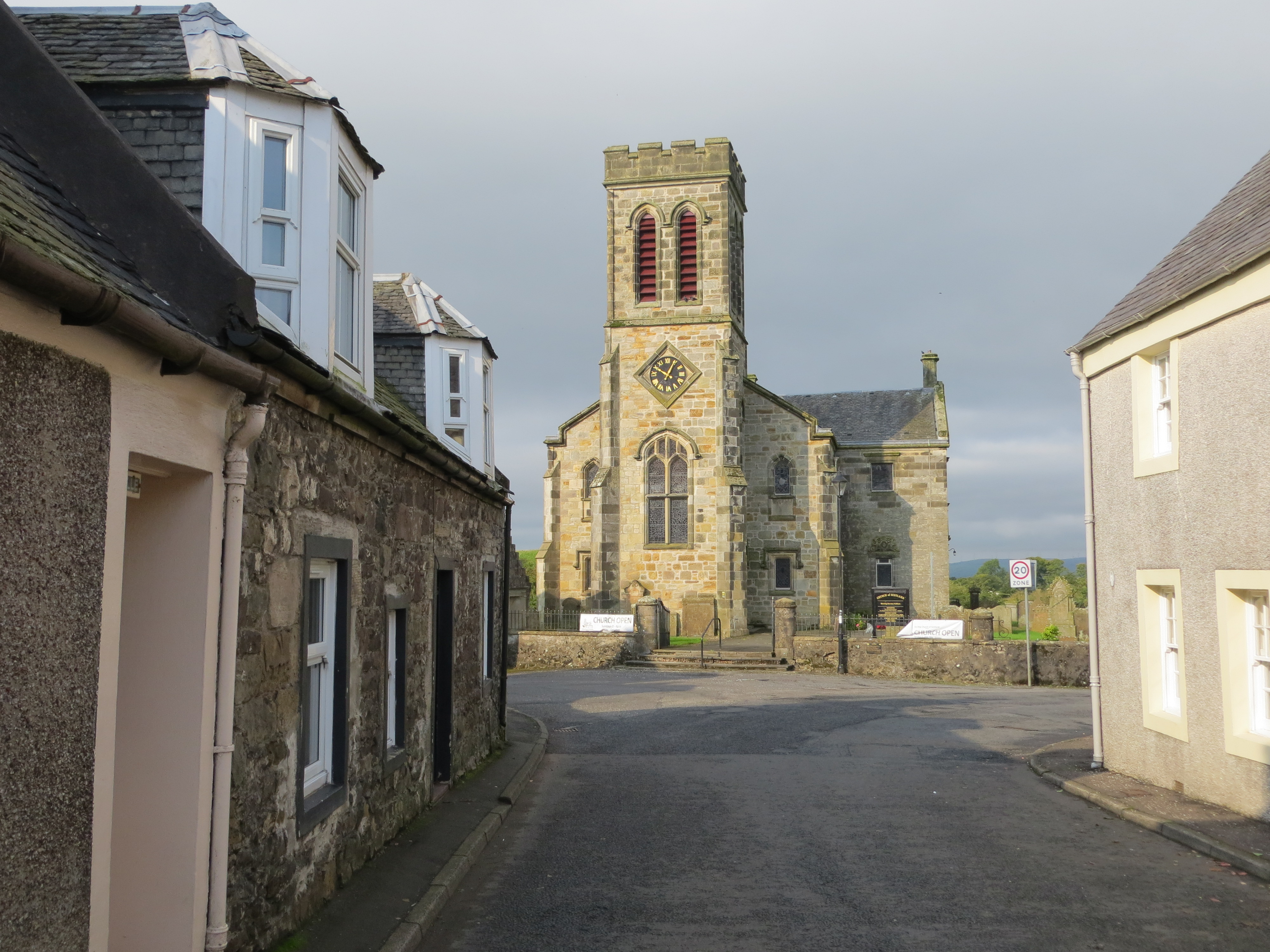
Location filming included the village of Dunlop, East Ayrshire

- Andrew Lincoln as John
- Eve Myles as Rebecca
- Ewen Bremner as Tommy
- Indira Varma as Fiona
- Lorn Macdonald as Angus
- Samuel Bottomley as Cameron
- Abigail Lawrie as Moira-Jane
- Lois Chimimba as Catriona
- Gilly Gilchrist as Nathan
- Jonathan Watson as Williams
- Greg Hemphill as Bobby

== Production ==
The six-part series is written by David Ireland, and produced by Sister for ITV. The series is executive produced by Chris Fry, Alice Tyler, Lydia Hampson, and Jane Featherstone. The series is produced by Ireland, Brian Coffey and Andrew Lincoln, who also stars. The lead cast also includes Eve Myles, Ewen Bremner, and Indira Varma.

Filming began in the UK in July 2024. Filming locations include Dennistoun, Glasgow, in Scotland. It was also filmed in the semi-rural town of Strathaven, South Lanarkshire, and the villages of Dunlop, East Ayrshire, and Gartocharn, West Dunbartonshire. Other locations in Stirlingshire included Blanefield, Buchlyvie, and Callander.

== Broadcast ==
Coldwater premiered on ITV and ITVX on 14 September 2025.

It aired on SBS Television and SBS on Demand in Australia from 10 June 2026.

== Critical reception ==
Lucy Mangan, writing in The Guardian, gave the series 3 out of 5 stars, calling it "top quality nonsense".

Anita Singh of The Telegraph gave the series 4 stars out of 5, calling it an "enjoyably weird psychological thriller".

Adam Sweeting of The Arts Desk called it "a smart and addictive thriller" and that Irish playwright David Ireland had "constructed the piece with fiendish skill, mingling hide-under-the-table climaxes with doses of laugh-out-loud black comedy".
