= How to Get to Heaven from Belfast =

Irish television series

- Genre: Dark comedy; Crime thriller
- Created by: Lisa McGee
- Starring: Roisin Gallagher; Sinéad Keenan; Caoilfhionn Dunne
- Music by: Sion Trefor
- Countries of origin: United Kingdom; Ireland
- Original languages: English; Irish
- No. of series: 1
- No. of episodes: 8

Production
- Executive producers: Caroline Leddy; Liz Lewin; Jimmy Mulville; Lisa McGee; Michael Lennox; Jessica Sharkey
- Producer: Brian J. Falconer
- Cinematography: Ashley Barron; Nathalie Pitters; Daniel Stafford-Clark
- Editors: Lucien Clayton; Nigel Williams; Ed Coltman
- Running time: 47–56 minutes
- Production companies: Derry Products; Hat Trick Productions

Original release
- Network: Netflix
- Release: 12 February 2026

How to Get to Heaven from Belfast is an Irish comedy thriller miniseries for Netflix created by Lisa McGee and produced by Hat Trick Productions. The series premiered on 12 February 2026.

== Premise ==
When three close friends from Belfast receive the news that the estranged fourth member of their teenage friend group has unexpectedly died, they travel to County Donegal in the north-west of Ireland to pay their respects. Strange events at the wake and a long-kept secret threatening to come out propel the trio into investigating their friend's mysterious death, but the amateur sleuths quickly find themselves in over their heads.

== Cast ==
=== Main ===
- Roisin Gallagher as Saoirse Shaw, a television writer
  - Emily Flain as young Saoirse
- Sinéad Keenan as Robyn Winters (née O’Casey), a mother of three sons
  - Maria Laird as young Robyn
- Caoilfhionn Dunne as Dara Friel
  - Chara Aitken as young Dara
- Natasha O'Keeffe as Greta
  - Emma Canning as young Greta
- Bronagh Gallagher as Booker
- Darragh Hand as Liam Kells
- Michelle Fairley as Margo Heaney

=== Recurring ===
- Selin Hizli as Jodie
- Saoirse-Monica Jackson as Feeney
- Jeanne Nicole Ní Áinle as Niamh
- Emmett J. Scanlan as Owen
- Tom Basden as Seb
- Ardal O'Hanlon as Seamus
- Michael Redmond as Garda Peadar
- Josh Finan as Jason Meadows/Andrew Meadows
- Peter Campion as Jim
- Leila Farzad as Marnie
- Jenn Murray as Jamie
- Matilda Freeman as Maria
- Deirdre O'Kane as Sister Patrick
- Ryan McParland as Feargal
- Eleanor Methven as Mrs. Friel
- Pat Shortt as Charlie
- Nikesh Patel as Harry
- James Martin as Tommy

== Episodes ==
| No. | Title | Directed by | Written by | Original release date |
|---|---|---|---|---|
| 1 | "The Wake" | Michael Lennox | Lisa McGee | February 12, 2026 |
Three friends, Dara, Robyn, and Saoirse, travel to a small Donegal town for a wake after receiving an email telling them that their old school friend, Greta, has died. There is a long-held secret in their past and they want to make sure it stays buried. Saoirse discovers that the body in the coffin is not Greta's, and the three friends flee in Robyn's car. They run off the road, heavily damaging the car.
| 2 | "The Secret" | Michael Lennox | Lisa McGee | February 12, 2026 |
Reeling from the crash, the friends vow to leave Greta and the past alone, but mysterious letters and an old notebook entice them to investigate.
| 3 | "The Ghost" | Michael Lennox | Lisa McGee | February 12, 2026 |
As a storm approaches Knockdara, Saoirse, Dara, and Robyn are stuck in the local hotel. Police officer Liam claims to have met another old friend of Greta's, named Jodie, just before Greta died.
| 4 | "The Girl From Sagres" | George Kane | Tobias Beer | February 12, 2026 |
The trio goes to a resort in Portugal to track down Jodie and encounter a violent woman named Booker.
| 5 | "The Box" | George Kane | Bronágh Taggart | February 12, 2026 |
The three friends try to escape from Booker by scrambling around St. Patrick's Day in Dublin. They meet Andrew, who claims to be the son of the man Greta killed when the girls were in school. The other three girls helped Greta bury the man's body, thinking he was Greta's abusive ex-boyfriend. Andrew tells them that his father was an investigative journalist.
| 6 | "Separate But Inseparable" | George Kane | Ava Pickett | February 12, 2026 |
Booker continues to try to get a box that Saoirse, Dara, and Robyn found in a locker at the resort in Portugal, where Jodie worked.
| 7 | "Outlaws, Liars and Fallen Angels" | Rachna Suri | Lisa McGee | February 12, 2026 |
Booker and her associates receive a summons to Derry to meet with their boss, who orders them to kill Greta.
| 8 | "Anagnorisis" | Rachna Suri | Lisa McGee | February 12, 2026 |
Saoirse, Dara, and Robyn track Greta to her childhood hometown. Instead of killing Greta, Booker provides her with passports and new identities for her and her family.

== Production ==
The eight-part series was created by Lisa McGee. In August 2023 the series was announced to be executive produced by Caroline Leddy, Liz Lewin, and Jimmy Mulville for Hat Trick Productions and Channel 4. In March 2024, the series moved to streaming service Netflix. Michael Lennox is the director.

On 1 July 2024, Roisin Gallagher, Sinéad Keenan and Caoilfhionn Dunne were cast in the lead roles. Younger versions of the main characters were cast with Emma Canning, Emily Flain, Chara Aitken and Maria Laird fulfilling the roles. The cast also includes Jeanne Ní Áinle as well as Emmett J. Scanlan, Tom Basden, Ardal O'Hanlon, Michelle Fairley, Saoirse-Monica Jackson and Josh Finan.

Filming began in Belfast in July 2024. Other filming locations include the Harbourview Hotel in Carnlough, (County Antrim), (County Louth), Saint John's Point (County Down), Mamore Gap and Inishowen, County Donegal, Dublin, and Malta.

Hat Trick Productions also produced Lisa McGee's previous series Derry Girls. Actors Sinéad Keenan, Emmett J. Scanlan, Maria Laird, Peter Campion, Ardal O'Hanlon, Bronagh Gallagher and Saoirse-Monica Jackson worked on both series, as did several other cast and crew members. The Derry Girls mural in Derry appears in a scene in episode 8.

In September 2026 it was reported that the series would not be renewed by Netflix.

== Release ==
The series was released on Netflix on 12 February 2026. The age rating for the series is "15" in the UK and "TV-MA" in the US.

== Reception ==
The review aggregator website Rotten Tomatoes reported an 95% approval rating based on 39 critic reviews. The website's critics consensus reads, "Stretching its tone in different directions without ever snapping, How to Get to Heaven from Belfast is another triumphantly funny and proudly Irish series from creator Lisa McGee." Metacritic, which uses a weighted average, gave a score of 79 out of 100 based on 13 critics, indicating "generally favorable" reviews.

How to Get to Heaven from Belfast was praised by critics.
