= Clean Sweep (TV series) =

Irish crime thriller television series

- Created by: Gary Tieche
- Written by: Gary Tieche, Fran Harris
- Directed by: Ronan Burke; Yves Christian Fournier
- Starring: Charlene McKenna; Barry Ward; Jeanne Nicole Ní Áinle; Adam Fergus
- Countries of origin: Ireland; Canada
- Original languages: English, Irish
- No. of seasons: 1
- No. of episodes: 6

Production
- Executive producers: Larry Bass; Mary Callery; Shannon Cooper; Aaron Farrell; Jin Ishimoto; Patty Lenahan Ishimoto; Graham Ludlow; Harvey Myman; Jean-Philippe Normandeau; Shari Segal; Gary Tieche
- Production companies: Shinawil; Incendo; Screen Ireland

Original release
- Network: RTÉ; SundanceNow
- Release: 14 May 2023

Clean Sweep is an Irish six-part crime thriller television series created by Gary Tieche. Distributed by ZDF Studios, it premiered on RTÉ in Ireland on 14 May 2023 and on SundanceNow in the United States on 22 June 2023. Tieche wrote the pilot and developed the series with Fran Harris, while it was directed by Ronan Burke and Yves Christian Fournier. Action is largely set in Wicklow with some scenes set in London or Northumbria. Filming began in 2021 in Wicklow, Wicklow Mountains and Dargle River into mid-2022. The main protagonists, Shelly (Charlene McKenna) and Jason (Barry Ward), are a married couple. Shelly is a stay-at-home mother, who raises their children. Into Shelly's life returns Charlie (Adam Fergus) – a former boyfriend from 20 years ago. Jason is a police detective, who pursues a murderer to advance his career. Jason is assisted by Fiona (Jeanne Nicole Ní Áinle) – the pair are also having a clandestine affair.

== Plot ==
Shelley is busy raising her children Caitlin and Niall, as well as stepson Derek. Caitlin loves to play hurling, but struggles upon entering puberty. Niall has cystic fibrosis and is being bullied by classmate Billy. Derek is taking illegal drugs while trying to attract a girlfriend. Shelly is surprised by Charlie, who calls her Maggie. They later meet in a hotel room, where Charlie reveals he wants them to confess to their historical crimes. Shelly/Maggie shoots Charlie dead. Jason is assigned to find the murderer with help from Fiona. Police determine that the victim, known as Philip, had been hiring a prostitute. Philip's fingerprints reveal he is actually Charlie. Charlie was a London-based, suspected drug dealer and police killer, who was presumed dead 20 years ago. Jason and Fiona are having a clandestine affair. They trace the prostitute to a brothel with human-trafficked women given tattoos by their pimp. Flashbacks show Shelly's past as Maggie, who was Charlie's girlfriend when they were working for Freddie. Freddie is a police undercover agent, who posed as a drug lord. Charlie's gang captures, tortures, and then kills Freddie. Charlie's gang member, Kenny, is dismembered and thrown into the Thames. Maggie runs away, adopts a new identity, and disappears from Charlie's life. Charlie also adopts a new identity, gets married and has two daughters. Years later Charlie, who became a born again Christian, decides to find Maggie and save her soul.

== Cast and characters ==
=== Main ===
- Charlene McKenna as Shelly Mohan a.k.a. Deirdre Ann Fallon née Margaret "Maggie" Gallagher: Jason's second wife, Caitlin and Niall's mother, Derek's stepmother. Formerly Charlie's gang member
- Barry Ward as Jason Mohan: Wicklow detective sergeant aspiring to become inspector, Shelly's husband, Grainne's ex-husband
- Jeanne Nicole Ní Áinle as Fiona Uba: Irish detective, Jason's subordinate. Has an affair with Jason
- Adam Fergus as Philip Paul Whelan né Charlie Lynch: 45-year-old, former underworld drug smugglers' gang leader, Maggie's ex-boyfriend, assumed new identity, fathered two daughters, became born again Christian

=== Recurring ===
- Katelyn Rose Downey as Caitlin Teresa MaryAnn Mohan: primary school student, Shelly and Jason's daughter, Niall's sister, Derek's half-sister
- Aidan McCann as Niall Mohan: primary school student, Shelly and Jason's son, has cystic fibrosis, bullied by Billy
- Rhys Mannion as Derek Mohan: secondary school student, Grainne and Jason's son, Shelly's stepson, briefly dates Doireann
- Grace Collender as Doireann Carrick: 16-year-old secondary school student, Derek's sometime love interest
- Aoibheann McCann as Katie Ryan: abrasive head of Parents' Association, Billy's mother
- Nathara Dayananda as Emma Wilson: Pam and Matt's daughter, Niall's classmate, becomes Caitlin's friend
- Trevor Kaneswaran as Matt Wilson: flirtatious American writer, Emma's father, Pam's husband
- Cathy Belton as Gwen Crichett: London police detective chief inspector, investigated Charlie's gang
- Benjamin Bergin as Billy Ryan: 11-year-old, Katie's son, bullies Niall
- Roisin Rankin as Aelish Flaherty: Niall's physiotherapist
- Robert Mitchell as Detective Ames: London detective, Gwen's subordinate
- Kevin Trainor as Martin Kelly: forensic analyst
- Orla Casey as Eileen: hotel housekeeper-cleaner
- Maeron Libomi as Luke: Derek's best friend, marijuana supplier
- Niall Bishop as Rory Lynch: prominent right-wing politician, Charlie's brother
- Youssef Quinn as Baxter: detective on Jason's squad
- Tristan Heanue as Alfred "Freddie Vee" Vance: Belfast-born undercover policeman posing as London drug lord, worked for Gwen, murdered by Charlie's gang
- Steve Gunn as Garret: London police commissioner, Gwen's boss, attempts to prevent Gwen re-investigating Charlie's gang
- Seán Duggan as Pat O'Connor: Garda sergeant at Jason's station
- Joe Rooney as Mr. Sweeney: school bus driver
- Luke Griffin as Colin O'Connor: police Superintendent, Jason's boss
- Caitríona Ennis as Mary: parent at primary school
- James Craze as Kenny Doyle: Charlie's gang member, murdered by rivals
- Peter McCamley as Yeats: Northumbria Special Crimes unit detective inspector
- Elaine Murphy as Betsy Overton: Philip's ex-wife, mother of their two daughters
- Evan Crimmins as Tony

== Production ==
Clean Sweep was named as a project that would receive public funding in November 2021. Created by Gary Tieche based on a true story, Shinawil was originally going to make the six-part thriller with Element 8 Entertainment before Incendo boarded the project instead. Fran Harris was attached to write the series with Tieche, with Ronan Burke and Yves Christian Fournier directing. Executive producers included Tieche, Larry Bass, Mary Callery, Jin Ishimoto, Patty Lenahan Ishimoto, and Harvey Myman for Shinawil; Shannon Cooper for SundanceNow; and Graham Ludlow, Jean-Philippe Normandeau and Shari Segal for Incendo.

In July 2022, it was revealed Charlene McKenna would lead the series alongside Barry Ward. Principal photography was originally scheduled to take place in 2021, but was postponed. McKenna was spotted filming by the Dargle River in early July 2022. Locations include Wicklow Mountains and neighbouring areas. Filming was completed late in 2022. Clean Sweep premiered on RTÉ in Ireland on 14 May 2023 and on SundanceNow in the United States on 22 June 2023. The series was broadcast on BBC Four from 26 July 2023. It was streamed on Netflix from early November 2024.
