= Gary Mitchell =

Northern Irish playwright (born 1965)

- Occupation: Writer
- Writing career
- Genre: Political thriller
- Notable works: In a Little world of Our own (1997); As the Beast Sleeps (1998); The Force of Change (2000)

Gary Mitchell is a Northern Irish playwright. He is best known for his plays In a Little world of Our own (1997); As the Beast Sleeps (1998); and The Force of Change (2000).

== Early life ==
Gary Mitchell came from a working-class, loyalist background. He left school at 16 and worked in the Civil Service before joining an Arts Council Youth and Community Drama Scheme.

== Career ==
Mitchell's first foray into writing was for Radio 4. His first play was produced by Tinderbox Theatre Company, but his first major theatre success was the production (by Connall Morrison) of his In A Little World of Our Own at the Peacock Theatre in Dublin, a gripping and unflinching portrayal of loyalist culture. It won The Irish Times Theatre Award for Best New Play in 1997, and it later went to Belfast as part of an Abbey Theatre tour. The following year the Peacock Theatre produced his As The Beast Sleeps.

His works have also premiered at London's Royal Court Theatre.

His work Tearing the Loom was written for the 200th anniversary of the Irish Rebellion of 1798.

== Personal life ==
Mitchel is married to Alison and they have several children.

In November 2005, he was forced out of his home in the Belfast suburb of Rathcoole after it was attacked by loyalist paramilitaries. He and his family had to live in hiding somewhere in Northern Ireland, which forced Mitchell to put his career on hold for five years.

== Recognition and awards ==
Mitchell was writer-in-residence at the Royal National Theatre in London in 1999.

In 2005, Angelique Chrisafis, writing in The Guardian, said that he had become "one of the most talked about voices in European theatre... whose political thrillers [had] arguably made him Northern Ireland's greatest playwright".

=== Theatre ===
- Aisling Award for Outstanding Achievement in Arts and Culture (2006) Remnants of Fear
- Evening Standard Charles Wintour Award for Most Promising Playwright (2000) The Force of Change
- Joint winner George Divine Award (2000) The Force of Change
- Pearson Best New Play Award (1999) Trust
- Belfast Arts Drama Award (1998) Sinking
- Belfast Arts Drama Award (1998) In a Little World of Our Own
- Irish Times Best New Play Award (1997) In a Little World of Our Own
- Stewart Parker Trust Award for Independent Voice
- BBC Radio Drama Young Playwrights Festival 1991 for his first work, The World, the Flesh and the Devil

=== Film ===
- Best Short Film, Belfast Film Festival (2003) Suffering
- Belfast Arts Award for Best Film (2002) As the Beast Sleeps

== Works ==
Plays

- Pride of the Shore (2024) Mac Theatre, Belfast
- Burnt Out (2023) Lyric Theatre, Belfast
- Silly Moos (2023) (Primary schools) Grand Opera House, Belfast
- Safe as Seasons (2018) Festival, Belfast
- 1932:The People of Gallagher Street (2016) with Martin Lynch, The Mac, Belfast
- Smiley (2016) Lyric Theatre, Belfast
- Demented (2014) Lyric Theatre, Belfast
- Forget Turkey (We liked it so much we're going to Phuket again) (2013) with Dan Gordon and Colin Murphy, Lyric Theatre, Belfast
- Re-energize (2013) Playhouse, Derry
- Forget Turkey (We're going to Phuket this Christmas) (2012) with Dan Gordon and Colin Murphy, Lyric Theatre, Belfast
- Love Matters (2012) Aisling Ghear, Belfast
- Suicide Blonde (2010) Old Red Lion, London
- Remnants of Fear (2005) Dubbeljoint, Belfast
- Loyal Women (2003) Royal Court Downstairs, London
- The Force of Change (2000) Royal Court Upstairs/Downstairs, London
- Marching On (2000) Lyric, Belfast
- Holding Cell (2000) Tinderbox, Belfast
- Energy (1999) Playhouse, Derry
- Trust (1999) Royal Court Upstairs, London
- Tearing the Loom (1998) Lyric, Belfast
- As the Beast Sleeps (1998) Peacock, Dublin
- In a Little World of Our Own (1997) Peacock, Dublin
- Sinking (1997) Replay, Belfast
- That Driving Ambition (1995) Replay, Belfast
- Alternative Future (1994) Point Fields, Belfast
- Independent Voice (1993) Tinderbox, Belfast

Radio plays

- Tubes (2022) RTE Radio 1
- Fighting Cowardice (2014) RTÉ Radio 1
- Ulster Volunteers (2014) RTÉ Radio 1
- Loves Worst Day (2013) BBC Radio 4
- Babies (2012) RTÉ Radio 1
- Freedom of Poverty (2011) RTÉ Radio 1
- Ian Really Likes Mary (2010) RTÉ Radio 1
- Echoes of War (2009) BBC Radio 3
- Forgotten People Part Two (2009) RTÉ Radio 1
- Forgotten People Part One (2009) RTÉ Radio 1
- Just 'Cause (2008) RTÉ Radio 1
- Loyal Women (2003) BBC Radio 4
- The Force of Change (2002) BBC Radio 4
- As the Beast Sleeps (2001) BBC Radio 4
- At the Base of the Pyramid (1997) BBC Radio 4
- Drumcree (1996) BBC Radio 4
- Dividing Force Episode Three: Useless Tools (1995) BBC Radio 4
- Dividing Force Episode Two: Raising the Standard (1995) BBC Radio 4
- Dividing Force Episode One: Above the Law (1995) BBC Radio 4
- Stranded (1995) BBC Radio 3
- Mandarin Lime (1995) with Jimmy Murphy BBC Radio 3
- Poison Hearts (1994) BBC Radio 4
- Independent Voice (1993) BBC Radio 4
- A Tearful of Dreams (1993) BBC Radio 4
- The World, the Flesh and the Devil (1991) BBC Radio 4

Television

- Eight Days That Made Rome (episodes) (2017) Channel 5 (UK)

Films

- Suffering (2003) Writer/director
- As the Beast Sleeps (2002) BBC 2
- An Officer From France (1998) RTÉ 1
- Made in Heaven (1996) BBC Education

Published Plays

- Burnt Out (2023)
- Loyal Women (2003)
- As the Beast Sleeps (2001)
- The Force of Change (2000)
- Trust (1999)
- Tearing the Loom (1998)
- In a Little World of Our Own (1998)

== See also ==
- List of Northern Irish writers
