= Alan Reeves (composer) =

Alan David Reeves is a British film composer, music producer, and Hammond B3 virtuoso. In the course of his career he has received 35 international awards, including a Goldene Schallplatte. He became known for his work with the bands The Showtimers and Clinic as well as for the music for the films To Walk with Lions, The Call of the Wild: Dog of the Yukon, and Kill Bill Vol. 2. He has appeared played or recorded with/for among others, the Rolling Stones, Jimi Hendrix, Chuck Berry and David Bowie and David Gilmore.
