= Tim Loane =

Tim Loane is an Irish screenwriter, playwright, director, lecturer, and actor from Northern Ireland. He was co-founder and joint artistic director of the Tinderbox Theatre Company until 1996.

== Early life and education ==
Tim Loane was born in County Antrim, Northern Ireland.

He was educated in Cork and then at Methodist College Belfast in Belfast, Northern Ireland. He earned a degree in psychology at Queen's University Belfast.

== Career ==
=== Tinderbox Theatre Company ===
In 1988, Loane co-founded the Tinderbox Theatre Company in Belfast, along with actor Lalor Roddy, BBC presenter Mark Carruthers, BBC drama producer Stephen Wright, and Angela McCloskey of the Lyric Theatre. He was joint artistic director of the company until 1996.

=== Writing and directing ===
In the 2000s, Loane wrote several plays, including Caught Red Handed, To Be Sure, and The Civilisation Game.

His screenwriting credits include BBC comedy Out of the Deep Pan; Ballykissangel (1996-2001, BBC 1), and ITV1's comedy film, Reversals. In 2001 Loane created the TV series Teachers for Channel 4 and was the lead writer for the first season. In 2009, Loane wrote six-part update series of Minder, Shane Richie and Lex Shrapnel. He also wrote the screenplays for the 2004 RTE 1 four-part conspiracy thriller Proof, with Orla Brady and Finbar Lynch, and has written for the long-running medical drama series Casualty. He wrote several episodes of the Irish police drama Red Rock (2015-2020) and series 2 and 3 of the CAPA/Canal+/BBC Versailles, as well as series 2 of Das Boot and series 3 of Marcella in 2020.

Loane has also written for radio, and has also directed other plays, including a production of Dario Fo's Can't Pay? Won't Pay! and the Irish Premiere of Dealer's Choice by Patrick Marber.

He is co-creator and writer of the upcoming six-part Wild Bunch TV / HBO/ France Télévisions drama series called Alice, about Alice Guy-Blaché, the first female film director. The series is co-created by Claire Lemaréchal, and co-written by Loane, Lemaréchal, and André Gulluni, and due for release in 2026. Bérénice Bejo plays the eponymous lead character in the series.

=== Acting ===
Loane has also starred in numerous roles on screen.

=== Academia ===
As of June 2026 Loane is a lecturer in the School of Arts, English and Languages at Queen's University Belfast.

== Recognition and awards ==
In 1997 Loane was nominated at the 70th Academy Awards for Academy Award for Best Live Action Short Film for the film Dance Lexie Dance.

In 2002 he won the Irish Times Best New Play Award and the Stewart Parker Trust Award for his play Caught Red Handed.

In 2012 he was awarded Doctor of Literature from Queen's University Belfast.

== Plays ==
Loane's plays include:

- Caught Red Handed (2002, Tinderbox, Belfast)
- To Be Sure (2007, Lyric Theatre, Belfast)
- The Civilisation Game (2012, Lyric Theatre, Belfast; also directed by him)
