= Inchicore College of Further Education =

College in Dublin, Ireland

Coordinates: 53.340211°N 6.31229°W

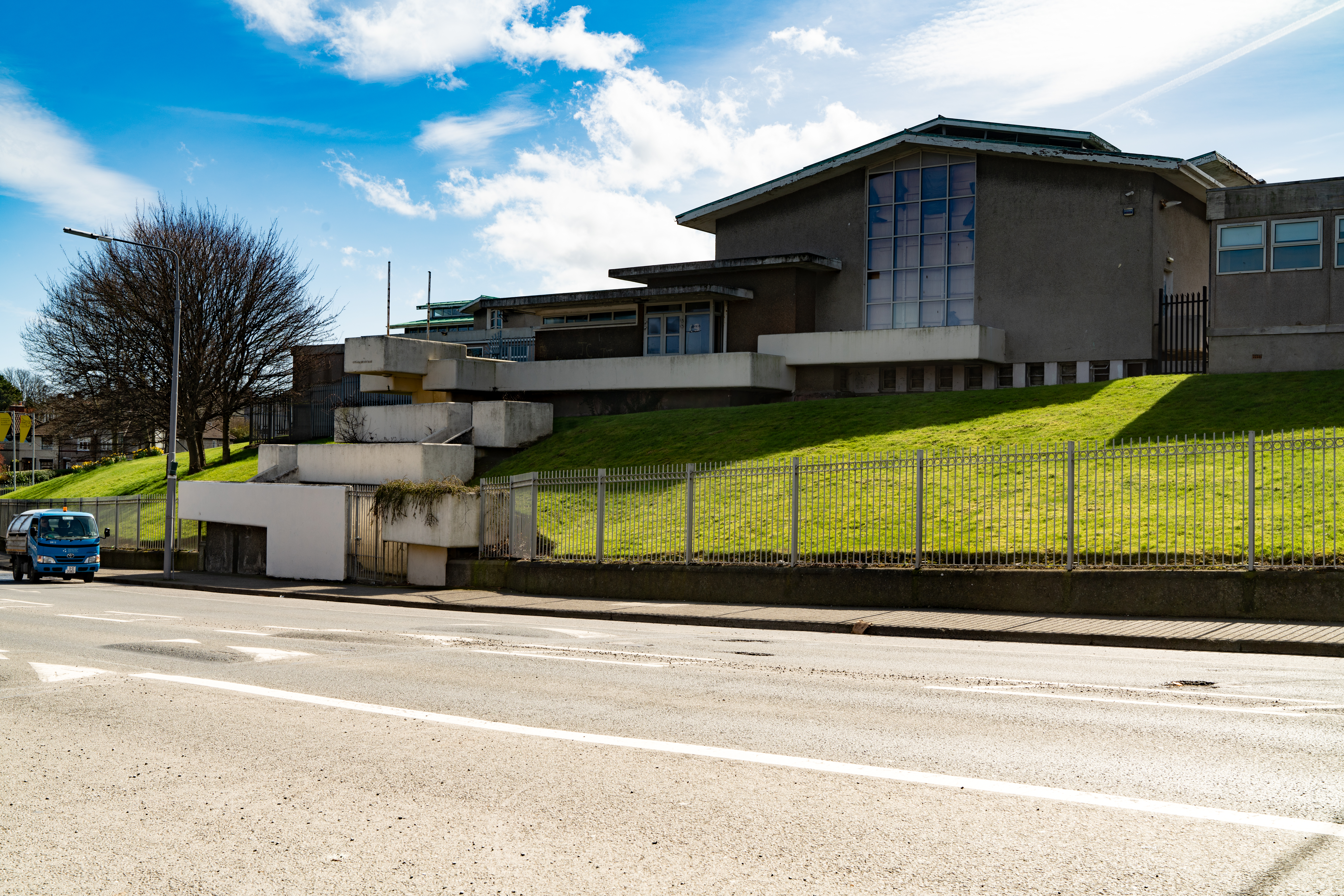
- Exterior in April 2018
- Established: 1957
- Affiliations: City of Dublin Education and Training Board; QQI
- Principal: Donnchadh Clancy
- Students: 850
- Address: Emmet Road; Inchicore; Dublin 8, Dublin, Ireland
- Website: http://www.inchicorecollege.ie

Inchicore College of Further Education is a college of further education in Ireland, under the oversight of the CDETB (City of Dublin Education and Training Board) and is located in Inchicore, Dublin, Ireland.

It was formerly known as Inchicore Vocational School when established in 1957.

== Academics ==
The college provides courses in Leisure and Recreation Management, Leisure and Disability Studies, Sports Coaching, Travel and Tourism Management, Computer Applications and Business Skills, Business Studies, Childcare and Education, Pre-Nursing Studies, Pre-Paramedic Studies, Childcare Studies, Care Practice, Social Studies, Return to Education, Theatre Studies (Performance and Dance), Costume Design and Makeup, Stage Management, Sound and Lighting, Set Design and Construction, Art and Design, Creative Writing and Cultural Studies.

=== Qualifications ===
The college is only engaged in further education and has no second level courses or classes. Awards are provided at QQI Level 5 and 6 as well as BTEC HND. Some part-time childcare courses are also offered at QQI level 4 and 5.

== Collaborations ==
Inchicore College operates an extensive European Links programme with partners in most member states of the EU. Students have the opportunity to participate in a work experience placement funded by the European Commission through the Leonardo da Vinci Programme. The college also works with its European partners developing new programmes funded through the Commenius, Grundtvig and Leonardo da Vinci programmes, all of which were part of the Lifelong Learning Programme 2007-2013.

In 2024, students can apply through the Erasmus programme to travel to an EU country for a 3-week work placement.
