= Caroline O'Donoghue =

Irish writer and podcaster

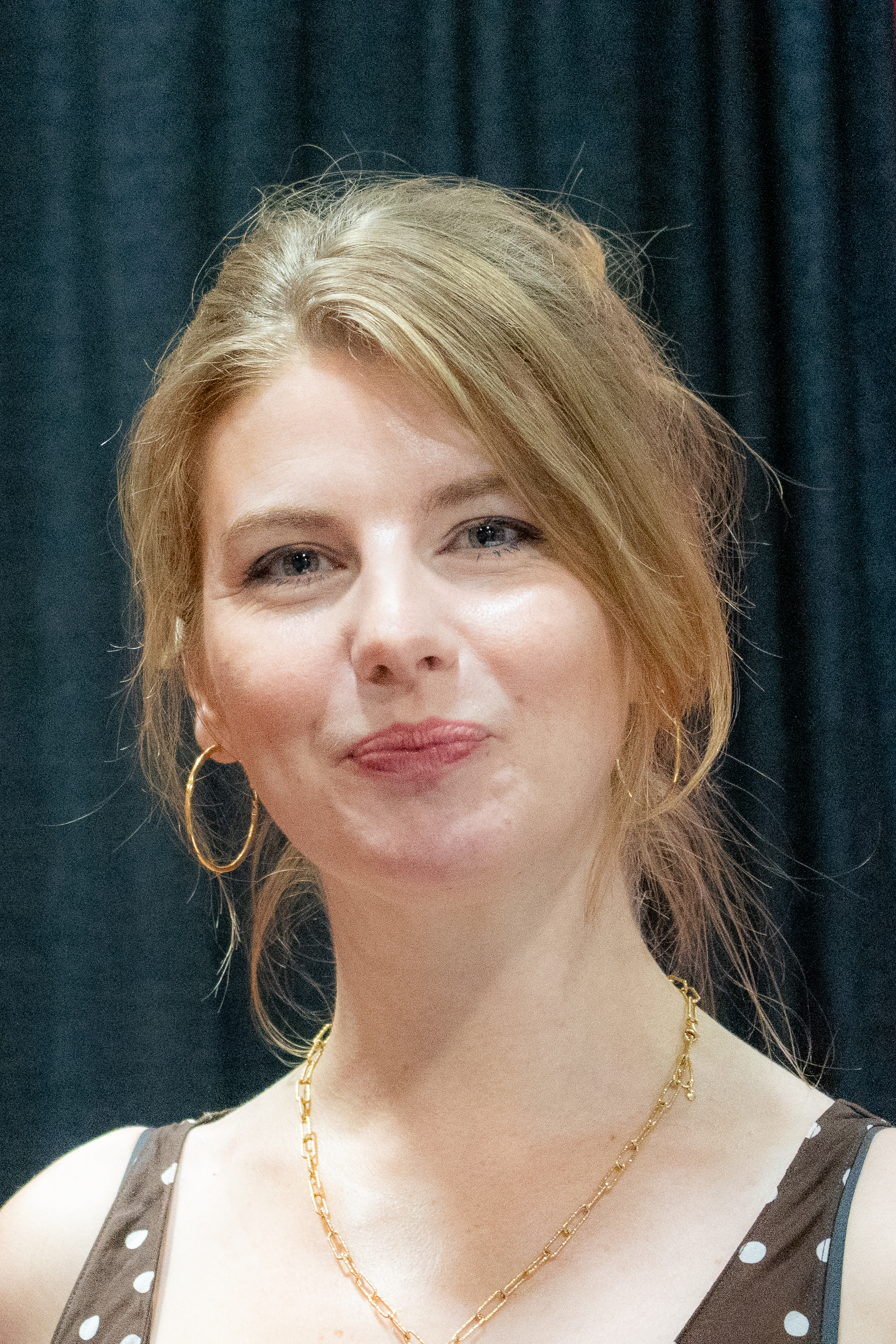
- O'Donoghue at the National Book Festival 2025
- Born: Cork, Ireland
- Occupation: Novelist
- Writing career
- Genre: Young adult

Caroline O'Donoghue is a writer from Cork, Ireland. As well as being a New York Times bestselling young adult novelist, she has also worked as a columnist (most notably for the Irish Examiner and Harper's Bazaar), and has a podcast, Sentimental Garbage.

== Writing ==
O'Donoghue's debut novel Promising Young Women, published in 2018 by Little, Brown, received favourable reviews, with The Irish Times comparing her to Sally Rooney and Rosita Sweetman and The London Magazine saying that her writing style was both "original and engaging". Her writing appeared in The Observer.

In 2020, O’Donoghue published Scenes of a Graphic Nature. The Guardian called the novel “witty, tender and insightful". The Irish Times said it was a "gorgeous exploration of the messy and fragile nature of friendship and all the many forms of love, as well as of the primal need we all have to belong".

Her next adult novel, The Rachel Incident, was published in 2023. It was described by The Washington Post as "heartbreaking and funny", with Ron Charles noting that "she may not have Binchy's sweetness, but she illuminates these Irish lives with a light all her own". The Irish Times called the book "a deeply satisfying novel about friendship and love". In 2024, The Rachel Incident was shortlisted for the Bollinger Everyman Wodehouse Prize for comic fiction. In early 2025, Channel 4 announced that it had commissioned O'Donoghue to adapt the novel into an eight-part series.

She has written a series of books intended for young adult readership, All Our Hidden Gifts, the first three books being: All Our Hidden Gifts (2021), The Gifts That Bind Us (2022), and Every Gift a Curse (2023). The first of the series, All Our Hidden Gifts, was a New York Times bestselling young adult title.

== Podcasts ==
In 2018, O'Donoghue started the "Sentimental Garbage" podcast, which deals with popular culture, especially women's fiction. This led to a spin-off podcast about Sex and the City, called Sentimental In The City, which is co-hosted with Dolly Alderton.

== Bibliography ==
- —— (2018). Promising Young Women. London: Little, Brown and Company. ISBN 978-0-349-00990-2.
- —— (2020). Scenes of a Graphic Nature. Virago. ISBN 9780349009971.
- —— (2021). All Our Hidden Gifts. Candlewick Press. ISBN 978-1-536-21394-2.
- —— (2022). The Gifts That Bind Us. National Geographic Books. ISBN 978-1-536-22222-7.
- —— (2023). Every Gift a Curse. Walker Books Limited. ISBN 978-1-529-50797-3.
- —— (2023). The Rachel Incident. London: Little, Brown and Company. ISBN 978-0-349-01355-8.
- —— (2025). Skipshock. Walker US. ISBN 978-1-5362-2881-6.
