= Rosemary Jenkinson =

Irish poet, playwright, and short story writer

Rosemary Jenkinson (born 7 September 1967) is an Irish poet, playwright, and short story writer.

== Biography ==
Rosemary Jenkinson was born in Belfast, Northern Ireland, in 1967 and is a self-proclaimed "ex-civil servant". Her parents, James and Denise Jenkinson, encouraged Jenkinson to be creative and well-traveled. While at Durham University, Jenkinson studied Medieval Literature. Jenkinson was a teacher of English during her travels to Greece, Poland, France, and the Czech Republic before returning to live in Belfast in 2002. Jenkinson's plays have been performed in New York, Washington DC, Dublin, Edinburgh, and Belfast. Her play The Bonefire was commissioned by the Rough Magic's Seed Project in 2004. The Bonefire was produced at the Dublin Theatre Festival and won the Stewart Parker BBC Radio Drama Award.

== Works ==
=== Novel ===
- The Memorisers (Arlen House, 2025)

=== Poetry ===
- Sandy Row Riots (Arlen House, 2024)

=== Short stories ===
- Contemporary Problems Nos. 53 & 54 (Lagan Press, 2004)
- Aphrodite's Kiss (Whittick Press, 2016)
- Catholic Boy (Doire Press, 2018)
- Lifestyle Choice 10mgs (Doire Press, 2020)
- Marching Season (Arlen House, 2021)
- Love in the Time of Chaos (Arlen House, 2023)
- Laganside Lights (Arlen House, 2025)

=== Plays ===
- The Bonefire (2006)
- The Winners (2008)
- Bruised (2008)
- Johnny Meister + the Stitch (2008)
- The Lemon Tree (2009)
- Stella Morgan (2010)
- 1 in 5 (2011)
- Basra Boy (2012)
- Cuchullain (2012)
- White Star of the North (2012)
- Planet Belfast (2013)
- A Midsummer Night's Riot (2014)
- The Dealer of Ballynafeigh (2015)
- Stitched Up (2015)
- Here Comes The Night (2016)
- Love or Money (2016)
- Michelle and Arlene (2017)
- Lives in Translation (2017)
- May the Road Rise Up (2018)
- I Shall Wear Purple (2019)
- Dream, Sleep, Connect (2020)
- Billy Boy (2021)
- Silent Trade (2023)

== Awards ==
- Shortlisted for Hennessy Award for New Irish Writing
- Asham Prize
- Brian Moore Short Story Award
- Black Hill Books Short Story Competition
- Stewart Parker BBC Radio Drama Award
- Northern Short Story Competition
- ACNI Major Artist Award
- EU Prize for Literature (shortlist)
- Edge Hill Short Story Prize (shortlist)
