= A Woman of Substance =

A Woman of Substance may refer to:

- A Woman of Substance (novel), 1979, by Barbara Taylor Bradford
- A Woman of Substance (1985 TV series), a British-American television series, based on the novel
- A Woman of Substance (2026 TV series), a British television series, based on the novel
