= A Woman of Substance (1984 TV series) =

1984 British-American television TV series

- British DVD cover from 2003
- Genre: Drama
- Based on: A Woman of Substance by Barbara Taylor Bradford
- Screenplay by: Lee Langley
- Directed by: Don Sharp
- Starring: Jenny Seagrove; Deborah Kerr; Barry Bostwick; Liam Neeson
- Composer: Nigel Hess
- Countries of origin: United Kingdom; United States
- Original language: English
- No. of series: 1
- No. of episodes: 3

Production
- Producer: Diane Baker
- Production locations: Yorkshire and London
- Cinematography: Ernest Vincze
- Editor: Teddy Darvas
- Running time: 290 mins
- Production company: Portman-Artemis

Original release
- Network: First-run syndication (United States)
- Release: 26 November – 10 December 1984
- Network: Channel 4 (United Kingdom)
- Release: 2 January – 4 January 1985

Related
- Hold the Dream; To Be the Best; A Woman of Substance (2026 series)

A Woman of Substance is a British-American three-part television drama serial, which premiered in the United States in November 1984. It is based on the 1979 novel of the same name by Barbara Taylor Bradford.

== Plot ==
In 1970, 80-year-old Emma Harte is a businesswoman.She spent her life building a business, including Harte's Department Store in London, as well as holdings in property and oil. While on a business trip, Emma informs her granddaughter, Paula, that she will be her business successor.

Back in London, Emma learns that her two sons, Kit and Robin, are plotting to force her retirement and break up and sell off her businesses. Emma then changes her will, leaving her business to her grandchildren.

The story flashes back to the early 20th century when teenaged Emma worked as a servant at Fairley Hall in rural Yorkshire, along with her father, Jack, and two brothers, Winston and Frank. The Fairley family owns several local businesses including a mill and a brickyard. After their mother's death, Winston joins the Royal Navy. Emma becomes romantically involved with the Fairley's younger son, Edwin and becomes pregnant. When Edwin refuses to marry her, Emma's friend, Shane "Blackie" O'Neill, an Irish navvy who works at Fairley Hall, suggests she move to start a new life. Emma relocates and tells her landlady and new friends that she is married to a sailor currently away at sea.

While looking for work, Emma rescues Abraham Kallinski from an anti-Semitic attack by local youths. Abraham introduces Emma to his wife, Janessa, and grown sons, David and Victor and offers Emma a job in his textile factory.

Blackie introduces Emma to Laura Spencer. They become good friends and Emma moves into Laura's house, and starts a new job at Thompson's Mill. Emma gives birth to a daughter, Edwina. Emma's cousin Freda takes baby Edwina so Emma can work. After working two jobs for a year, Emma makes enough money to rent a shop in Armley in which she sells fabrics, clothing, and luxury food goods. It is a success, and Emma opens two more. Emma is horrified when Edwin Fairley's vile brother, Gerald, unexpectedly arrives. He discovered Emma working at Thompson's Mill, now owned by his father. He says Edwin is about to be engaged and demands to know where their child is. Emma refuses and after a violent confrontation, she marries her landlord, Joe Lowther, for protection. Soon after, they have a son named Kit.

Emma goes into partnership with the Kallinskis. Unfortunately, her private life runs less smoothly. Joe is killed in the Battle of the Somme and Laura, now married to Blackie, dies giving birth to a son, Bryan. Emma takes in Bryan to live with her and her children until Blackie returns from the war.

In early 1918, Emma falls in love with Australian Army officer Paul McGill. He is sent to the war in France after recovering from a leg injury. After the war, Emma is hurt and disappointed to learn that Paul has returned to his estranged wife. She turns to an acquaintance, Arthur Ainsley, for consolation, agreeing to marry him. She and her new husband have twins, Robin and Elizabeth, but the marriage is short-lived when Paul returns. Emma is angry until Paul explains that he tried writing but his secretary hid the letters. They start seeing each other and she divorces her husband after giving birth to Paul's daughter, Daisy.

Emma has never forgiven the Fairleys for how they treated her and her family. Now rich and powerful, she buys the Fairley's holdings, including Fairley Hall, which she intends to demolish and use as a public park.

In February 1939, with a new war on the horizon, Paul travels to Australia to ask his wife for a divorce. While there, he narrowly survives a car crash. He redraws his will, leaving nearly everything to Emma and Daisy (including his vast shares in the Sitex oil company). He then commits suicide. Emma is devastated but eventually recovers enough to run her business empires.

Emma's children marry and have children – Edwina, Kit and Robin have one child each. Elizabeth marries repeatedly and has four, and Daisy marries and has two, including Paula.

Back in 1970, Emma invites the family to her Yorkshire estate for her 80th birthday. After dinner, Emma informs them she changed her will, effectively disinheriting her children (except Daisy, to whom she leaves the house and her father's sapphires) for their deceit and leaving everything to her grandchildren instead. She announces that Paula will inherit the Harte's Department Store chain. Emma's other four children are furious but reluctantly accept £1 million each and sign agreements they will not contest her will. Emma also gives her blessing to Paula's engagement to Jim Fairley, Edwin's grandson, thus ending her lifelong hatred of the Fairley family.

== Cast ==
=== Starring ===
- Jenny Seagrove as Young Emma Harte
- Barry Bostwick as Major Paul McGill
- Deborah Kerr as Emma Harte

=== Co-starring ===
- Diane Baker as Laura O'Neill
- Peter Chelsom as Edwin Fairley
- John Duttine as Joe Lowther
- Peter Egan as Adam Fairley
- Mick Ford as Frank Harte
- Christopher Gable as Arthur Ainsley
- Christopher Guard as Gerald Fairley
- Dominic Guard as Winston Harte
- Del Henney as Jack Harte
- Gayle Hunnicutt as Olivia Wainwright
- Barry Morse as Murgatroyd
- Liam Neeson as Blackie O'Neill
- Nicola Pagett as Adele Fairley
- Miranda Richardson as Paula McGill Amory
- Joris Stuyck as David Kallinski
- Meg Wynn Owen as Elizabeth Harte

=== Featuring ===
- George Baker as Bruce McGill
- Megs Jenkins as Mrs. Turner
- Harry Landis as Abraham Kallinski
- John Mills as Henry Rossiter

== Production ==
The drama was produced by the British company Portman-Artemis, and was co-financed by the UK's Channel 4 and the US-based OPT Organisation (a subsidiary of MCA Television). Producer Diane Baker (who also co-stars as Laura Spencer) first met Taylor-Bradford prior to the novel being published, whilst Taylor-Bradford was working for a newspaper in New York and was interviewing Baker (who worked predominantly as an actress at that time) for an article about interior design. After the novel was published, Baker contacted Taylor-Bradford to obtain the television rights, remortgaging her house in order to do so.

Don Sharp was not the original director. He says the producers were unhappy with the progress of the film during pre-production; the original director and several heads of production were fired, and Sharp was brought in four weeks before filming. Sharp says it was he who cast Jenny Seagrove and that Diane Baker recommended Liam Neeson.

The series was largely filmed in Yorkshire in the north of England, and locations include Brimham Rocks (where Emma first meets Blackie on the moors), Richmond (for most of Armley), and the main shop-front of the Emma Harte Emporium in London. The original Armley store was a then disused row of shops in Crown Street Darlington (opposite the towns main post office). Filming took twelve weeks.

The budget was $6 million. Sharp said the original cut ran long because they did not have enough time during pre production to cut the script as thoroughly as he would have liked.

== Broadcast and ratings ==
The miniseries premiered in United States on 26 November 1984, airing over the course of three Monday nights.

The drama was aired by Channel 4 in the UK over three nights from 2 to 4 January 1985. The broadcast of the final part on 4 January drew 13.8 million viewers, which remains the channel's highest ever audience. It was shown in limited syndication in the United States several weeks before the British transmission, in order to qualify for the 1985 Primetime Emmy Award.

== Award nominations ==
For the 1985 Primetime Emmy Award, A Woman of Substance was nominated for Outstanding Limited Series, and Deborah Kerr was nominated for Outstanding Supporting Actress in a Limited Series or Special.

== Sequels and the 2026 series ==
Barbara Taylor-Bradford's sequel, Hold the Dream, was produced as an eponymous serial in 1986, again starring Deborah Kerr and Jenny Seagrove, though Seagrove now played the role of Paula. It was again directed by Don Sharp, who spent most of the decade directing in this genre.

A second sequel, To Be the Best, was adapted in 1991 and starred Lindsay Wagner as Paula.

In February 2025, Channel 4 announced that it had commissioned the novel's second television adaptation, with Katherine Jakeways and Roanne Bardsley serving as writers. Brenda Blethyn and Jessica Reynolds were cast as Emma Harte. The eight-part first series premiered on 11 March 2026 and it was renewed for a second series in June 2026.
