= A Woman of Substance (novel) =

1979 novel by Barbara Taylor Bradford

- First edition
- Author: Barbara Taylor Bradford
- Language: English
- Genre: Family saga, Romance
- Publisher: Doubleday
- Publication date: 1979
- Publication place: United States
- Media type: Print (Hardback & Paperback))
- ISBN: 0-7394-1250-7

A Woman of Substance is a novel by Barbara Taylor Bradford, published in 1979. The novel is the first of a seven-book saga about the fortunes of a retail empire and the machinations of the business elite across three generations. The series, featuring Emma Harte and her family, also includes Hold the Dream, To Be the Best, Emma's Secret, Unexpected Blessings, Just Rewards and Breaking the Rules.

A Woman of Substance was adapted in 1985 as an eponymous television miniseries (as were the sequels Hold the Dream and To Be the Best). In 2026, an eight-part television adaptation was released on Channel 4.

== Plot summary ==
The book starts with an elderly Emma Harte flying to New York with her personal assistant and favourite grandchild, Paula. Emma contemplates the empire she has created. On their arrival in New York, Emma's secretary, Gaye, tells her she heard Emma's sons discussing a plan to force her to retire and break up her empire so the pieces can be sold. Devastated initially, Emma isn't surprised but changes her will, choosing to leave her business interests to her grandchildren instead.

The story then goes back to when Emma was a teenage servant at Fairley Hall, in rural Yorkshire. Her father, Jack, and two brothers, Winston and Frank, also work for the Fairley family. Jack and Frank work at the mill, and Winston works at the brickyard. After the death of his mother, Winston joins the navy, as he had wanted to since he was a child. As parlour maid, Emma sees a lot of the Fairley family and becomes friends with the younger son, Edwin. Emma also meets Blackie O'Neill, a wandering Irish navvy who has been hired to do some work at Fairley Hall, and they become friends. One day, Emma and Edwin realise they feel more for each other than friendship. Their friendship becomes intimate, and Emma gets pregnant. Edwin, horrified at this news, does not offer to marry her, so she runs away to Leeds. Wanting to protect herself and her child from gossip, Emma tells her landlady and new friends she is married to a sailor currently away at sea.

While looking for work, she meets Abraham Kallinski and rescues him from an anti-semitic attack. Emma gets rid of them and walks him home. He introduces her to his wife, Janessa, and sons, David and Victor. When Emma tells them she is looking for work, Abraham immediately offers her a job at his clothing workshop. As Emma's baby's birth approaches, Blackie arranges for her to meet his friend Laura Spencer in the then village of Armley. Laura needs someone to share household expenses, and Emma moves in, and Laura gets her a job at Thompson's Mill. In March, Emma has a daughter and names her Edwina. As Emma must work to support herself and her child, Emma's cousin, Freda, takes Edwina. After a year of working two jobs, Emma makes enough money to rent a shop in Armley. This shop is a success, and Emma's business expands. Not expecting to see the Fairleys, she is horrified when Edwin's brutish brother Gerald visits. Worried Gerald will return, she marries her landlord, Joe Lowther. They have a son, Christopher, nicknamed Kit.

Emma's business continues to expand by going into business with the Kallinskis. Unfortunately, her private life doesn't run as smoothly. Joe is killed in the Battle of the Somme and Laura, now married to Blackie, dies giving birth to a son, Bryan. Emma raises Bryan until Blackie returns from the war. In early 1918, Emma meets Paul McGill, with whom she has an intense affair. Paul is in the Australian army and returns to France after recovering from a leg injury. After the war, he goes home and, despite promising to write, never does. Emma, hurt and disappointed, especially when she discovers he and his wife have a son, turns to an acquaintance for consolation and marries again. She and her new husband have twins, Robin and Elizabeth, but the marriage is unhappy and ends when Paul returns. Emma is initially angry but calms down when Paul explains why he never wrote to her. Emma has a daughter with Paul, whom they name Daisy after his mother.

In February 1939, seeing war on the horizon, Paul goes to Australia to get his affairs in order, as he anticipates that once war starts travel will be difficult if not impossible. While there, he is seriously injured in a car crash and almost dies. He survives but is disfigured, and is told he will be dead within a year. He redraws his will, leaving almost everything to Emma and Daisy, and commits suicide. Emma is devastated but eventually recovers enough to look after her family and business empires.

Back in 1968, Emma invites her family to her house in Yorkshire for the weekend. She tells them she has discovered their treachery and outmaneuvered them by changing her will. Her older children are furious, but each accepts a one million pound trust that Emma offers as a bribe to not cause trouble. Her grandchildren are pleased, and all promise to run their section well. Emma also gives her blessing to Paula's becoming involved with Jim Fairley. He is Edwin's grandson, and Emma tells him Edwina is his aunt, but he had guessed, seeing her resemblance to his great-grandmother, Adele.

== Influence ==
The novel has been compared to Lace by Shirley Conran, due to their influence on women readers.

== Television adaptations ==
In 1984, the book was adapted as a television miniseries starring Jenny Seagrove as the young Emma Harte; Deborah Kerr plays the older Emma Harte. The debut UK screening of this series, in January 1985, gave Channel 4 its highest ever audience figures, with 13.8 million viewers. The sequels Hold the Dream and To Be the Best were made in 1986 and 1992, respectively. Hold the Dream again features Deborah Kerr as Emma Harte but now stars Jenny Seagrove as her granddaughter, Paula (replacing Miranda Richardson, who had played her in the first mini-series). To Be the Best stars Lindsay Wagner as Paula, running the Harte empire ten years after Emma's death. All three programmes are available on DVD.

A second television adaptation for Channel 4 began filming in April 2025, with Brenda Blethyn and Jessica Reynolds playing Emma Harte. The first series was released on 11 March 2026 and was renewed for a second season in June 2026.
