= Emma Harte =

Fictional character

Emma Harte is the protagonist of Barbara Taylor Bradford's 1979 novel A Woman of Substance. In the 1984 TV mini-series, the character was played by actresses Deborah Kerr and Jenny Seagrove, and in the 2026 TV series by Brenda Blethyn and Jessica Reynolds.

Emma Harte's story begins as a maid at Fairley Hall when she is 14 years old. She falls in love with her master's son, Edwin Fairley. She becomes pregnant and he "lets her down" by refusing to marry her. She flees to Leeds at 15, so as not to disgrace her father and brothers.

In Leeds, Emma seeks out her friend Blackie O'Neil. Her daughter Edwina is born when she is 16 years old. After more than a year of scrimping, saving, working day and night and creating a home business on the side, she finally saves enough to open her own shop. It is the beginning of an empire so vast she eventually buys everything the Fairleys own.

There are eight books written by Barbara Taylor Bradford in the Emma Harte series:

- A Woman of Substance (1979)
- Hold the Dream (1985)
- To Be The Best (1988)
- Emma's Secret (2003)
- Unexpected Blessings (2005)
- Just Rewards (2005)
- Breaking the Rules (2009)
- A Man of Honour (2021)
