= Pavel Bednařík =

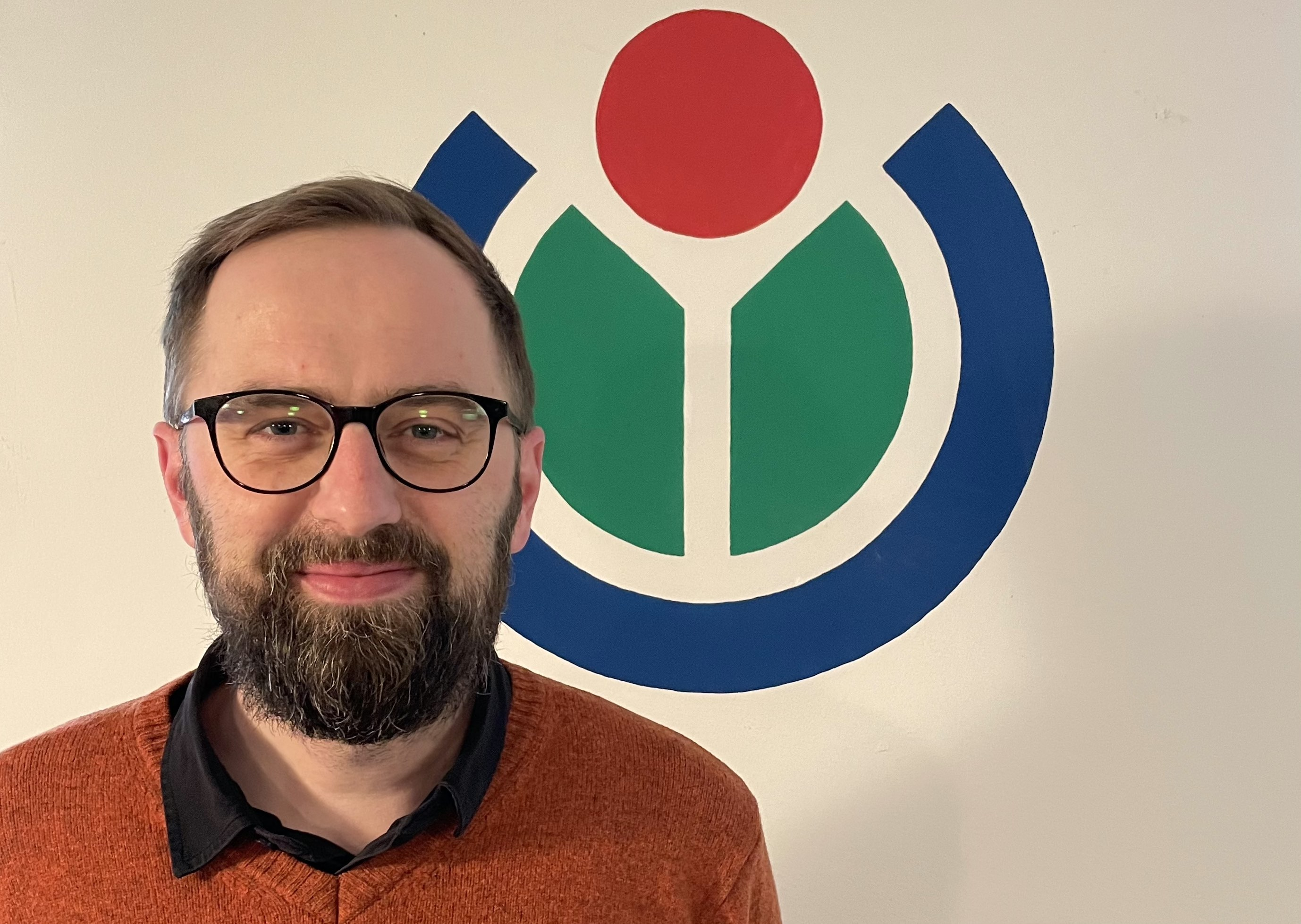
- Born: 7 March 1980 (age 46); Přerov, Czechoslovakia
- Education: Palacký University Olomouc
- Years active: 2000–present
- Employer: Wikimedia Czech Republic
- Known for: Filmouka
- Political party: Green Party
- Partner: Dagmar Říhová
- Children: 2
- Mother: Věra Bednaříková
- Website: pavelbednarik.org

Pavel Bednařík (born 7 March 1980) is a Czech film historian, politician, entrepreneur and Wikimedia chief tutor, lecturer and manager. He was an Artistic director of Summer Film School Festival and a founder of Filmouka, film guide for pupils and schools.

== Life ==
He was born in Přerov, Czechoslovakia (now the Czech Republic). His early years spent with his mother in Otrokovice and Zlín. He studied at Otrokovice grammar school, graduated in 1998. In 1999 he applied and was accepted for Palacky University in Olomouc, where he studied film studies and philosophy at Faculty of Arts (Filozofická fakulta). He finished his studies in 2007 with a master's degree on relation of Ideology and Cinema. He was active during his studies in various student and cultural activities (PASTICHE FILMZ film club, Festival of Film Animation Olomouc, Academia Film Olomouc, student strikes and feasts).

== Career ==
=== Early years ===
He started to work as an editor-in-chief, editor and coordinator for several film festivals, such as Academia Film Olomouc (2007–2008), Jihlava International Film Festival (2001–present day), in Olomouc he organised or co-organised retrospectives of filmmakers such as Krzysztof Kieślowski, Raul Ruiz, Fracois Ozon or Peter Solan. Some filmmakers (Michael Glawogger, Vít Klusák, Filip Remunda, Filip Ježek) were invited in person, introducing their film selection.

=== Summer Film School and film clubs ===
In 2007, he was appointed as an artistic director of Summer Film School (Letní filmová škola) in Uherské Hradiště and Association of Czech Film Clubs (Asociace českých filmových klubů). He was given trust after six years of different work positions at the festival (editor-in-chief of festival daily, coordinator, catalogue editor). Since 2008 he introduced new concept of the festival, organising profound retrospectives and tribute sections, inviting guests such as Julio Medem, Jan Švankmajer, Jaco Van Dormael, Ken Loach, Aki Kaurismäki, Otakar Vávra, Emir Kusturica, Béla Tarr, Apichatpong Weerasethakul and many more). In 2011, he decided not to continue working for the festival, being its regular guest.

=== Olomouc ===
After 1-year experience working for Karlovy Vary Film Festival (2012) as an International press manager he followed various activities and jobs in Olomouc and Prague.

=== Northern Ireland ===
In 2016, he left to Northern Ireland for his academic research on film education, based in Northern Ireland Screen, Belfast. He worked for Strand Cinema, Belfast Film Festival and Deliveroo, using his experiences for writing the paper on the system of arts education in Nerve centres in Belfast, Derry and Amma Centre in Armagh.

=== Film Education expert ===
In 2019, he was elected as a chairman of the board of Association of the Film and Audiovisual Education, providing networking, project management and teachers training all around Czech Republic. He also developing a concept of a text book for elementary school children called Filmouka. Later he became an expert on film education during a curriculum reform run by the National Pedagogical Institute.

== Political career ==
In 2011, he became member of the Green Party in the Czech Republic. In 2014, he was elected as the member of a local council in Olomouc, withdrawing in 2016 due to internship in Northern Ireland. He is still an active member of the party.

== Wikimedia CZ ==
In February 2022, Bednařík became a chief tutor of Wikimedia Czech Republic, taking care of lecturer team, preparing and hosting lectures, courses and workshops with students, librarians and seniors. Since 2023 he also became manager of Programs for Partnerships, which include GLAM participation and Wikipedian in residence agenda. As a film studies graduate he decided to organise CEE region challenge called Wiki Loves Film, which started in 2024. His engagement in Wikimedia activities consists of organising and supporting wikiclub organisers, providing guidance and help for general public and helping anyone interested in Wikimedia community.
