= Gauguin the Savage =

1980 American film

- Genre: Biography; Drama
- Written by: J.P. Miller
- Directed by: Fielder Cook
- Starring: David Carradine; Lynn Redgrave; Flora Robson; Michael Hordern; Ian Richardson
- Theme music composer: Gerald Fried
- Country of origin: United States
- Original language: English

Production
- Producers: Douglas Benton; Robert D. Wood
- Production locations: France; Tahiti
- Cinematography: Walter Lassally
- Editor: Greyfox
- Running time: 150 min.
- Production company: Nephi Productions Inc.

Original release
- Network: CBS
- Release: April 29, 1980

Gauguin the Savage is a 1980 American TV film. It is a biopic of the artist Paul Gauguin starring David Carradine.

== Cast ==
- David Carradine as Paul Gauguin
- Lynn Redgrave as Mette Gad
- Flora Robson as Sister Allandre
- Michael Hordern as Durand-Huel
- Ian Richardson as Degas
- Bernard Fox as Captain Chablat
- Barrie Houghton as Vincent van Gogh
- Emrys James as Maurice Schuffenecker
- Carmen Mathews as Madame Jeanette
- Alan Caillou as Inspector Aumont
- Christopher Cary as Doctor Feydeau
- Fiona Fullerton as Rachel
- Alex Hyde-White as Emil
- Timothy Carlton as De Monfreid
