= Ben Reynolds (athlete) =

Irish hurdler

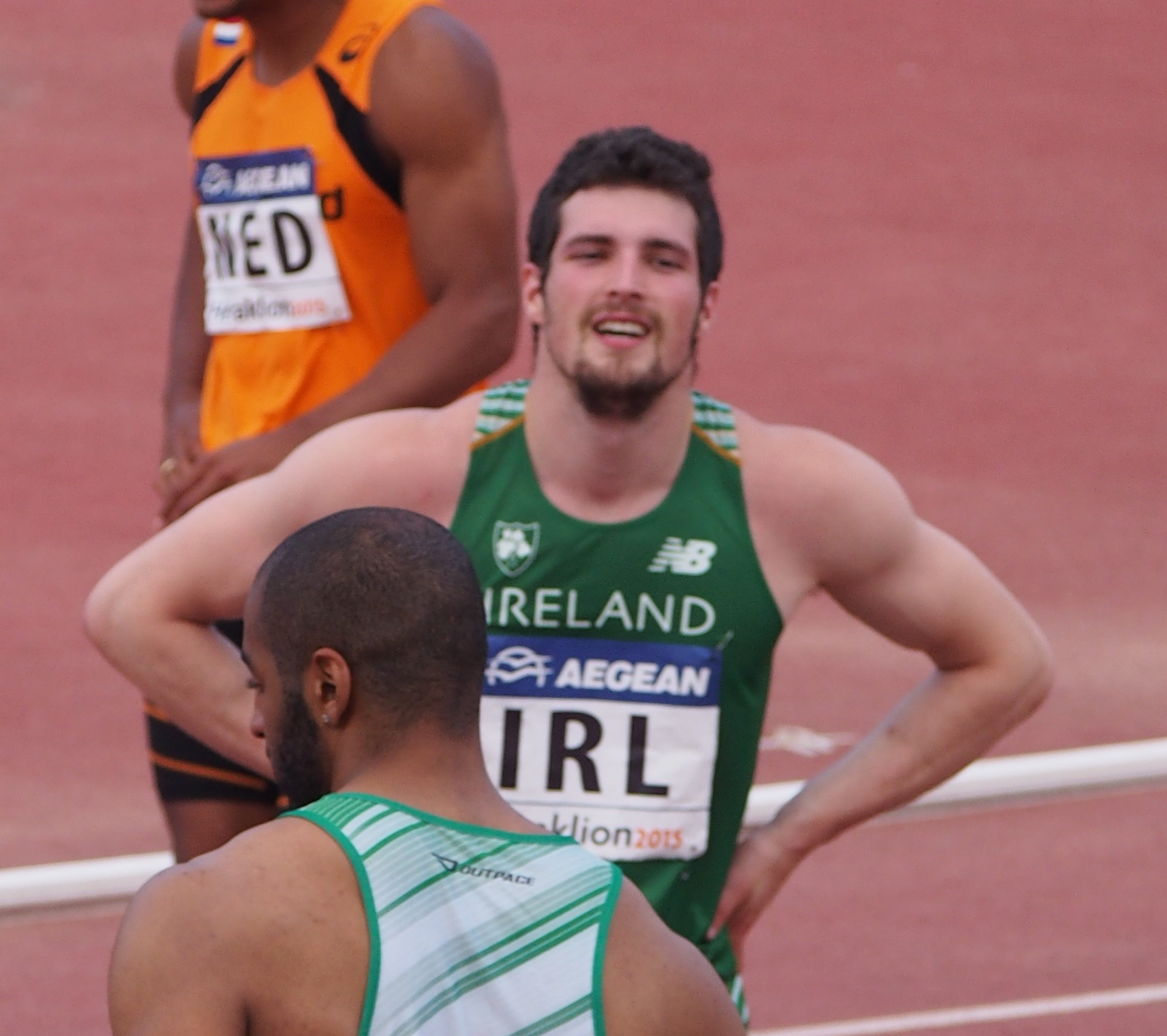
- Ben Reynolds at 2015 European Team Championships First League.

Personal information
- Born: 26 September 1990 (age 35) Dundonald, Northern Ireland, United Kingdom

Sport
- Sport: Athletics
- Event: 110 metres hurdles
- Coached by: Tom Reynolds (2013–); James Hillier (2010–2013)

Ben Reynolds (born 26 September 1990) is an Irish athlete specialising in the sprint hurdles. He represented his country at the 2015 World Championships in Beijing. His personal bests are 13.48 seconds in the 110 metres hurdles (+0.8 m/s, Bedford 2015) and 7.73 seconds in the 60 metres hurdles (Athlone 2016).

== Early life and education ==
Reynolds attended Rockport School in Holywood, County Down and lived in the grounds of the school where his father was a boarding master. His sister is actress Jessica Reynolds.

== Competition record ==
Year	Competition	Venue	Position	Event	Notes
Representing Great Britain and Northern Ireland
2008	Commonwealth Youth Games	Pune, India	5th	110 m hurdles (99 cm)	14.42
2009	European Junior Championships	Novi Sad, Serbia	7th (sf)	110 m hurdles (99 cm)	13.71
Representing Ireland and Northern Ireland
2012	World Indoor Championships	Istanbul, Turkey	13th (sf)	60 m hurdles	7.80
2014	Commonwealth Games	Glasgow, United Kingdom	15th (h)	110 m hurdles	13.96
2015	World Championships	Beijing, China	29th (h)	110 m hurdles	13.72
2016	European Championships	Amsterdam, Netherlands	14th (h)	110 m hurdles	13.87
2017	European Indoor Championships	Belgrade, Serbia	17th (h)	60 m hurdles	7.81
2018	World Indoor Championships	Birmingham, United Kingdom	29th (h)	60 m hurdles	7.89
2018	Commonwealth Games	Gold Coast, Australia	9th (h)	110 m hurdles	13.70
