= The Rising (TV series) =

British television series

- Genre: Supernatural drama; Crime drama
- Based on: Hotel Beau Séjour by: Bert Van Dael; Sanne Nuyens
- Written by: Pete McTighe; Charlene James; Roanne Bardsley; Laura Grace
- Directed by: Ed Lilly; Thora Hilmarsdottir; Paul Walker; Carl Tibbetts
- Starring: Clara Rugaard; Nicholas Gleaves; William Ash; Matthew McNulty; Rebecca Root; Emily Taaffe; Alex Lanipekun; Ann Ogbomo; Nenda Neururer; Robyn Cara; Solly McLeod; Cameron Howitt; Lee Byford
- Composer: Carly Paradis
- Country of origin: United Kingdom
- Original language: English
- No. of series: 1
- No. of episodes: 8

Production
- Executive producers: Pete McTighe; Julian Stevens; Serena Thompson
- Producers: Sid Strickland; Mark Hedges; Jayne Chard
- Production location: England
- Cinematography: Craig Feather; Dale Elena McCready; Angus Mitchell; James Rhodes
- Editors: William Blunden; Fiona Brands; Dan Robinson; Abolfazl Talooni
- Running time: 50 minutes
- Production company: Sky Studios

Original release
- Network: Sky Max
- Release: 22 April 2022

The Rising is a British supernatural crime drama television series based on the 2017 Belgian series Hotel Beau Séjour, created by Bert Van Dael and Sanne Nuyens. It premiered on 22 April 2022 on Sky Max. In March 2023, it was cancelled after one season.

== Premise ==
The Rising tells the story of Neve Kelly, a young woman who finds out that she is dead. After realising that she has been murdered, she determines to find her killer and get justice. As she begins her investigation, Neve discovers that she has the ability to interfere in the world around her as well as interact with certain individuals, one of whom she grows close to.

== Cast and characters ==
=== Main ===
- Clara Rugaard as Neve Kelly
- Nicholas Gleaves as William Wyatt
- William Ash as Michael Wyatt
- Matthew McNulty as Tom Rees
- Rebecca Root as DS Diana Aird
- Emily Taaffe as Maria Kelly
- Alex Lanipekun as Daniel Sands
- Ann Ogbomo as Christine Wyatt
- Nenda Neururer as Alex Wyatt
- Robyn Cara as Katie Sands
- Solly McLeod as Joseph Wyatt

=== Supporting ===
- Cameron Howitt as Max Sands
- Oliver Huntingdon as Nicky
- Laura Aikman as Victoria Sands

== Episodes ==
No. overall	Episode	Directed by	Written by	Original release date
1	Episode 1	Ed Lilly	Pete McTighe	22 April 2022
2	Episode 2	Ed Lilly	Pete McTighe	22 April 2022
3	Episode 3	Thora Hilmarsdottir	Charlene James	22 April 2022
4	Episode 4	Thora Hilmarsdottir	Charlene James	22 April 2022
5	Episode 5	Paul Walker	Roanne Bardsley	22 April 2022
6	Episode 6	Paul Walker	Roanne Bardsley	22 April 2022
7	Episode 7	Carl Tibbetts	Laura Grace	22 April 2022
8	Episode 8	Carl Tibbetts	Pete McTighe	22 April 2022

== Production ==
Deadline Hollywood reported that Sky Studios was developing a series based on Hotel Beau Séjour in October 2019. The show was announced in April 2021 and is the first full in-house production for Sky Studios. It is written by Pete McTighe, Charlotte Wolf, Roanne Bardsley, Gemma Hurley, and Laura Grace. Ed Lilly served as lead director, with McTighe, Serena Thompson, and Julian Stevens executive-producing, while Lilly and Wolf also served as associate producers.

Principal photography began in May 2021 in the north of England, with filming locations that included the Lake District and areas surrounding Manchester. The eight episodes were split into four filming blocks, with each two episodes helmed by different directors. Filming ended in October 2021, and post-production continued into early 2022, with final picture and sound work being completed in London.

McTighe stated in May 2022 that he had plans for a second season, to be titled Risen. Sky Studios cancelled production in March 2023, however, two months before it was scheduled to start.

=== Marketing ===
In Cumbria, a hologram of the protagonist, Neve, was projected onto Derwentwater the day before the series was released. The figure mouthed "come and find me" to passers-by, who were surprised to stumble upon the projection on their morning walk.

== Broadcast ==
The first trailer was released in December 2021. The series premiered on 22 April 2022 on Sky Max in the United Kingdom. In the United States, the series premiered on 29 May 2023 on the CW.

== Reception ==
Writing for Fiction Horizon, Nelson Acosta gave the show a mostly positive review, praising Clara Rugaard's acting, as well as the cinematography. He also commented that it lacked humour and dynamism. At The Upcoming, Andrew Murray also complimented newcomer Rugaard and wrote positively about the show's plotlines and hooks. He criticised its focus on teen drama, however.
