= Diana (British TV series) =

- Written by: Andrew Davies
- Directed by: David Tucker (eps. 1-5); Richard Stroud (eps. 6-10)
- Starring: Kevin McNally; Jenny Seagrove
- Country of origin: United Kingdom
- Original language: English
- No. of series: 1
- No. of episodes: 10

Production
- Producer: Ken Riddington
- Running time: 55 minutes

Original release
- Network: BBC1
- Release: 12 January – 15 March 1984

For the American TV series starring Diana Rigg, see Diana (American TV series).

Diana is a British television drama series first broadcast by the BBC in 1984. It was adapted by Andrew Davies from two R. F. Delderfield novels.

It follows the intersecting but very different lives of Jan Leigh (Kevin McNally), a poor but studious young country lad and Diana Gayelorde-Sutton (Jenny Seagrove), the equally single minded daughter of a rich landowner, from the 1920s through to post-war Britain. The early story revolves around the class mismatch between the pair; the besotted Jan attempts to elevate his status through hard work and the more aloof Diana attempts to keep her affections in check and pursue her own goals.

The story is mainly told from Jan's POV, as Diana comes unexpectedly (and disruptively) back into his life at various points, then departs as unpredictably as she came. A recurrent theme (depicted memorably in the show's animated opening credits sequence) is a pair of Common Buzzards they used to see as children, circling each other over a field—coming together to rear young during the breeding season, then parting for a time. Somehow always together, even when separated. Mated for life.

The complete series of ten episodes is available on DVD in the UK through Simply Media.

== Episodes ==
Broadcast Thursday evenings on BBC1 at 9:25pm, except Episode 10, broadcast at 9:35pm. Produced by Ken Riddington.

Main cast: Kevin McNally, Jenny Seagrove, Patsy Kensit, Harold Innocent, Mary Morris, Fulton Mackay, Jonathan Lynn, Moray Watson, Gillian Raine, Michael Melia & Gertan Klauber.

| No. | Title | Directed by | Written by | Original release date |
|---|---|---|---|---|
| 1 | "Episode 1" | David Tucker | Andrew Davies | 12 January 1984 |
When John Leigh arrives in Devon to live with his relatives, little does he realise how his life is to change – and all because of a chance meeting with Diana Gayelorde-Sutton.
| 2 | "Episode 2" | David Tucker | Andrew Davies | 19 January 1984 |
Jan sets out to learn the qualities required of a gentleman in order to impress Diana. But, his plans for the future seem destined to fail.
| 3 | "Episode 3" | David Tucker | Andrew Davies | 26 January 1984 |
Two years have passed and Jan leaves Devon to work on a Fleet Street newspaper. He soon finds that the experience he gains is not confined merely to his journalistic talents.
| 4 | "Episode 4" | David Tucker | Andrew Davies | 2 February 1984 |
Just when he least expects it, Jan's idyllic days with Diana are brought to an end. He accepts an assignment abroad, only to find the past catching up with him.
| 5 | "Episode 5" | David Tucker | Andrew Davies | 9 February 1984 |
Jan's life seems to be taking a turn for the better; it appears that nothing can stand in his way. Or so he thinks.
| 6 | "Episode 6" | Richard Stroud | Andrew Davies | 16 February 1984 |
With the outbreak of the Second World War, Jan leaves 'Sennacharib' and discovers that by coming to terms with the past he is able to look forward to the future.
| 7 | "Episode 7" | Richard Stroud | Andrew Davies | 23 February 1984 |
Posted to a quiet desk job near his home, Jan enjoys two years of happily married bliss. Suddenly his military duties change and dramatically alter the course of his life.
| 8 | "Episode 8" | Richard Stroud | Andrew Davies | 1 March 1984 |
Jan's return to France proves to be a shattering experience – in more ways than one.
| 9 | "Episode 9" | Richard Stroud | Andrew Davies | 8 March 1984 |
Back in England, Jan makes a last attempt to put his life into some sort of order. But fate has yet another card up her sleeve.
| 10 | "Episode 10" | Richard Stroud | Andrew Davies | 15 March 1984 |
Jan is sent on his final, most dangerous mission of the war – the repercussions of which are almost too much to bear.
