= A Woman of Substance (2026 TV series) =

British television series

- Genre: Historical drama
- Created by: Katherine Jakeways; Roanne Bardsley
- Based on: A Woman of Substance by Barbara Taylor Bradford
- Written by: Katherine Jakeways; Roanne Bardsley
- Directed by: John Hardwick; Samantha Harrie; Richard Senior
- Starring: Brenda Blethyn; Jessica Reynolds; Emmett J. Scanlan; Lydia Leonard
- Music by: Jack Halama
- Country of origin: United Kingdom
- Original language: English
- No. of series: 1
- No. of episodes: 8

Production
- Executive producers: Beth Willis; Joe Innes; George Faber; Katherine Jakeways
- Producer: Charlie Palmer
- Running time: 47 minutes (per episode)
- Production company: The Forge

Original release
- Network: Channel 4
- Release: 11 March 2026 – present

Related
- A Woman of Substance (1985 series)

A Woman of Substance is a British historical drama television series created for Channel 4 and written by Katherine Jakeways and Roanne Bardsley, based on the 1979 novel of the same name by Barbara Taylor Bradford. The cast is led by Brenda Blethyn and Jessica Reynolds in the role of Emma Harte.

The eight-part first series premiered on 11 March 2026 on Channel 4 and it was renewed for a second series in June 2026.

== Cast ==
- Brenda Blethyn as Emma Harte
- Jessica Reynolds as younger Emma
- Emmett J. Scanlan as Adam Fairley
- Lydia Leonard as Olivia Wainwright
- Leanne Best as Adele Fairley
- Ewan Horrocks as Edwin Fairley
- Harry Cadby as Gerald Fairley
- Will Mellor as Jack Harte
- Lenny Rush as Frank Harte
- Niall Wright as Mac O'Neil
- Robert Wilfort as Murgatroyd
- Mara Huf as Paula Amory
- Toby Regbo as Jim Fairley
- Hiftu Quasem as Priya Chandra
- Sophie Bould as Elizabeth Harte
- Philip Hill-Pearson as Joe Lowther
- Georgina Sadler as Polly
- Leon Cole as Shop Customer (uncredited)

== Episodes ==
No.	Directed by	Written by	Original release date	Broadcast date (UK)
1	John Hardwick	Katherine Jakeways	11 March 2026	11 March 2026
2	John Hardwick	Roanne Bardsley	11 March 2026	12 March 2026
3	John Hardwick	Roanne Bardsley	11 March 2026	18 March 2026
4	Samantha Harrie	Katherine Jakeways	11 March 2026	19 March 2026
5	Samantha Harrie	Roanne Bardsley	11 March 2026	25 March 2026
6	Richard Senior	Katherine Jakeways	11 March 2026	26 March 2026
7	Richard Senior	Roanne Bardsley	11 March 2026	1 April 2026
8	Richard Senior	Katherine Jakeways	11 March 2026	2 April 2026

== Production ==
=== Development ===
The series is produced by The Forge and is adapted by Katherine Jakeways, with Roanne Bardsley, and adapted from the 1979 novel of the same name by Barbara Taylor Bradford. The series was announced as in development for Channel 4 in February 2025. The series was first adapted for the channel in 1984, and a new adaptation had first been reported in November 2024. Beth Willis, Joe Innes, George Faber and Jakeways are the executive producers and Charlie Palmer the series producer with John Hardwick a director. In June 2026, Channel 4 renewed the series for second series.

The series is the second television adaptation of the novel, with the first adaptation starring Deborah Kerr and Jenny Seagrove.

=== Casting ===
In April 2025, Brenda Blethyn, Jessica Reynolds and Emmett J. Scanlan joined the cast in leading roles. The cast also includes Lydia Leonard, Leanne Best, Lenny Rush, Ewan Horrocks and Will Mellor.

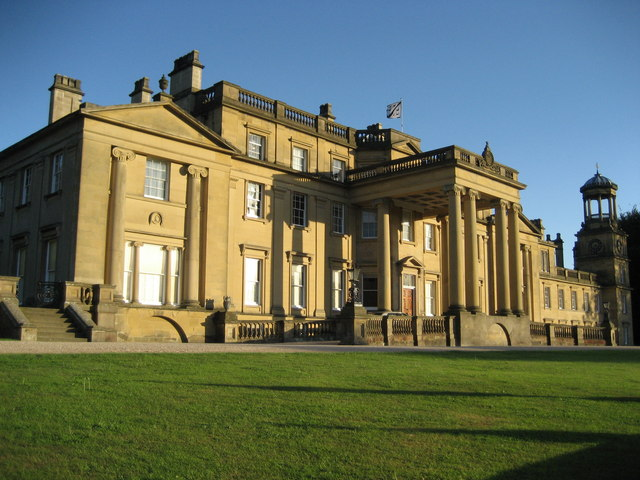
Broughton Hall served as Fairley Hall in both the 1985 and 2026 adaptations.

=== Filming ===
Filming began in Yorkshire in April 2025, with interiors and exteriors of Broughton Hall featured heavily. Series creator Katherine Jakeways revealed that author Barbara Taylor Bradford had personally requested that production was "as Yorkshire-based" as much as possible, which Jakeways says was honoured.

Filming also took place in Liverpool and at Beamish open-air museum in County Durham. Rose garden and below stairs scenes were filmed at Brodsworth Hall in Doncaster.

== Release ==
The series' first episode was broadcast on Channel 4 on 11 March 2026, with the eight-part series available as a boxset on C4's streaming service on the same date.

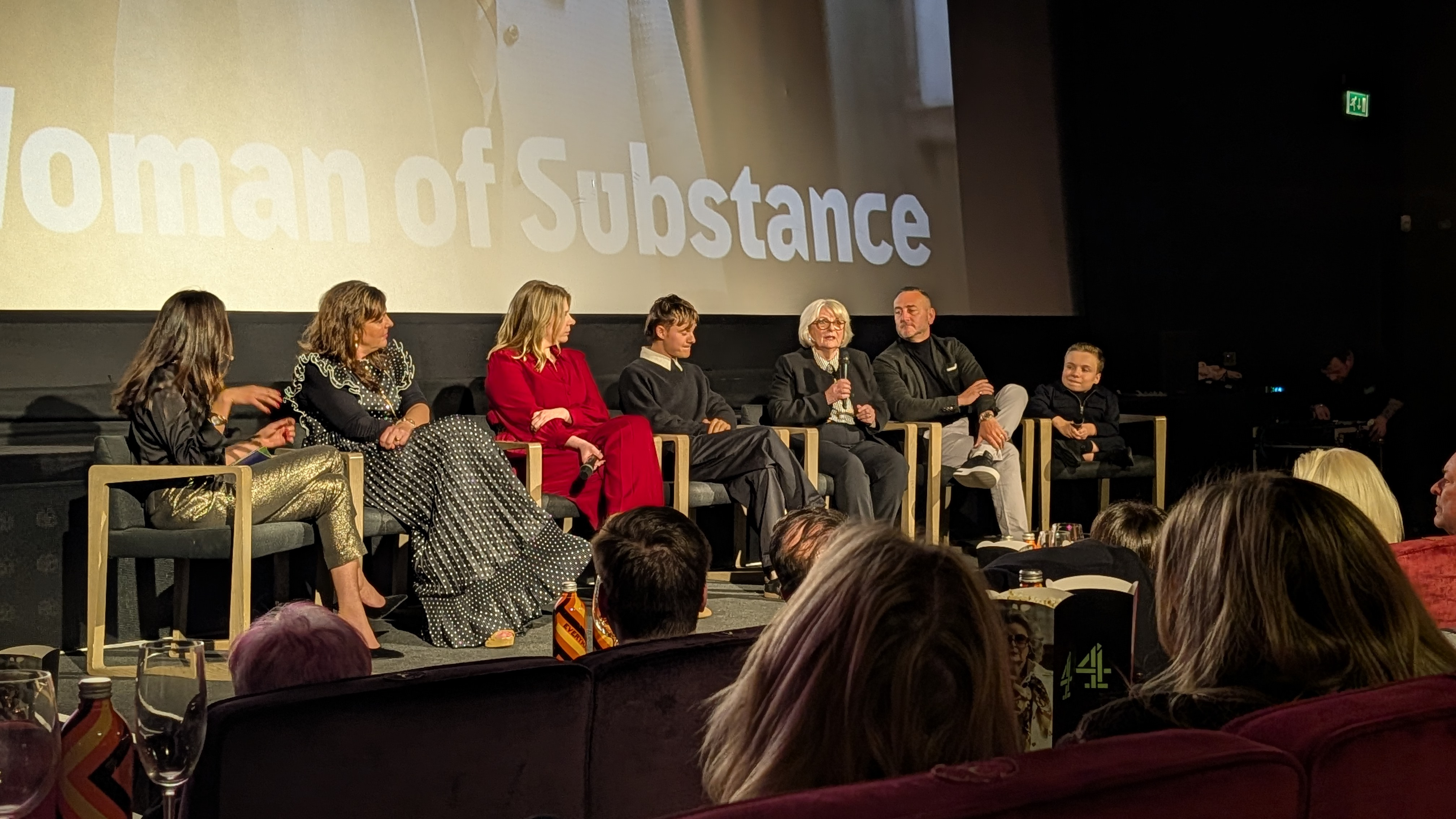
Panel discussion at the premiere of A Woman of Substance in Leeds in February 2026.

Banijay Rights, who is responsible for the series' international distribution, confirmed in February 2026 that the United States streaming rights for the series had been secured by BritBox.

=== Ratings ===
Episode 1 attracted an overnight audience of 1.42 million, making A Woman of Substance the most viewed Channel 4 drama premiere since Before We Die in 2021.

The series itself was Channel 4's most streamed since It's a Sin (2021).

== Reception ==
The first series received positive reviews, with Mail+ calling it a "stunning adaptation", and Woman & Home describing it as "absolutely glorious" and a "powerful, feminist watch". In a five star review for The Daily Mail, Christopher Stevens described the "brilliant rags-to-riches epic" as "an outrageously guilty pleasure".

Hollie Richardson of The Guardian described it as "another wonderful (and horny) retelling" of the novel, and Helen Fear of TV Guide said that "if you're a fan of period dramas" then this "quality series" is "a great yarn". Anna Walker wrote for The Conversation that the series is "visually sumptuous", taking place in an "unapologetically glossy period world", adding that "the storytelling [still] retains the unabashed melodrama."

Radio Times called it "epic, sweeping, unironic TV", adding that the series "remains hypnotic for the same reasons it worked all those years ago", additionally describing Reynolds as a "captivating tour-de-force". Daily Express asserted that the "glossy, polished" series does Taylor Bradford's work "justice", adding that the costume designers "have gone all out", making the series "far more stylish than the 1985 version". The Telegraph noted that writers Jakeways and Bardsley "bring a modern sensibility" to the "entertaining" adaptation, ultimately awarding four stars.

Metro called it a "worthy heir" to the 1985 adaptation, describing it as "engrossing" and "tremendous fun to watch", awarding it three stars and noting comparisons to Disney+ series Rivals. Charlotte O'Sullivan of The Independent, in her three star review, also referenced Rivals and gave "kudos" to the series' creators for the "mostly thrilling series", describing Reynolds' performance as "extraordinary" and Blethyn's as "magnetic". In another three star review, Financial Times described the series as a "Downton-meets-Dallas reboot" which is "perfectly watchable" albeit "stuck in the 1980s".

== Awards and nominations ==
Year	Award	Category	Nominee	Result	Ref.
2026	Edinburgh TV Awards	Breakthrough Performance	Jessica Reynolds	Nominated	
2026	National Television Awards	New Drama	A Woman of Substance	Nominated	
2026	Seoul International Drama Awards	Mini Series	A Woman of Substance	Nominated	
2027	TV Choice Awards	New Drama	A Woman of Substance	Pending	
2027	TV Choice Awards	Drama Performance	Brenda Blethyn	Pending	
