= Ancestors (film) =

Upcoming film

- Directed by: David Turpin
- Written by: David Turpin
- Produced by: David Collins; Eamon Hughes; Miranda Ballesteros
- Starring: Éanna Hardwicke; Jack Wolfe; Jessica Reynolds; Rupert Everett
- Cinematography: Patrick Jordan
- Edited by: Stephanie McCutcheon
- Music by: Stephen Shannon
- Production companies: Samson Films; Lunatica
- Release date: 12 September 2026
- Countries: Ireland; United Kingdom
- Language: English

Ancestors is a 2026 Irish-British mystery drama written and directed by David Turpin, and starring Rupert Everett, Éanna Hardwicke, Christina Hendricks, Jessica Reynolds and Jack Wolfe.

The world premiere was set for the Discovery section of the 2026 Toronto International Film Festival on 12 September 2026.

== Premise ==
Set in London during the 1980s during the AIDS crisis, a gay man searches for a lost love.

== Cast ==
- Éanna Hardwicke as Beau
- Jack Wolfe as Tiny
- Jessica Reynolds as Shell
- Rupert Everett as Maurice
- Christina Hendricks as Gloria
- Margi Clarke as Cherry
- Tony Flynn as Wilbur
- Patrick Martins as Henry
- Simon Nader Mirza as Sgt. Hughes
- Teddy Moore as Pinky
- Jaime Nanci as Butch
- Mark O'Halloran as Speaker

== Production ==
The film is written and directed by David Turpin in his feature directorial debut. Turpin's previous screenwriting credits include The Lodgers (2017) and The Winter Lake (2020). Turpin described Ancestors as "the mystery of a missing person" that evolves into "a journey into something deeper", using "the language of dreams" to explore themes of memory, mortality and ancestry. Production comes from Samson Films, with David Collins, Eamon Hughes and Miranda Ballesteros as producers. Costume design is by Saileóg O’Halloran. The creative team also includes cinematographer Patrick Jordan, production designer Louise Mathews, make-up designer Madonna Bambino and casting director Shaheen Baig. The soundtrack features original songs composed and performed by Jack Wolfe and David Turpin, as well as Jaime Nanci.

The cast includes Rupert Everett, Éanna Hardwicke, Christina Hendricks, Jessica Reynolds and Jack Wolfe. Principal photography took place in Dublin, Ireland, and was completed by October 2025.

== Release ==
The film had its world premiere in the Discovery section of the 2026 Toronto International Film Festival on 12 September 2026.

== Awards ==
At TIFF, the film won the FIPRESCI Prize.
