= Screw (TV series) =

2022 British prison drama series

- Genre: Drama
- Created by: Rob Williams
- Starring: Nina Sosanya; Jamie-Lee O'Donnell; Faraz Ayub; Laura Checkley
- Original language: English
- No. of series: 2
- No. of episodes: 12

Production
- Executive producers: Rob Williams; Sarah Brown
- Producer: Brian Kaczynski
- Production company: STV Studios

Original release
- Network: Channel 4
- Release: 6 January 2022 – 14 September 2023

Screw is a British prison drama series starring Nina Sosanya and Jamie-Lee O'Donnell. The series was produced by STV Studios and first broadcast on Channel 4 on 6 January 2022. The second series was released on 30 August 2023. On 4 February 2024, it was announced by Ben Tavassoli that Channel 4 had cancelled the series.

== Plot ==
Series 1 follows two prison officers and their colleagues, working in C-Wing of men's prison Long Marsh. Leigh Henry struggles to maintain control of her wing. New recruit Rose Gill arrives and is soon caught up in a gun smuggling operation in order to save her brother from a ruthless gang to whom he owes a drug debt.

Series 2 continues in the aftermath of the dramatic events at the end of series 1. Officer Henry learns that an undercover police officer has been placed on the wing – but who is it, and why are they there?

== Cast ==
- Jamie-Lee O'Donnell as Rose Gill
- Nina Sosanya as Leigh Henry
- Faraz Ayub as Ali Shah
- Laura Checkley as Jackie Stokes
- Stephen Wight as Gary Campbell
- Ron Donachie as Don Carpenter
- Bill Blackwood as Tony Tanner
- Mark Newsome as Streaky
- Jake Davies as Stephen Childs
- Nicholas Lumley as Larry
- Ben Tavassoli as Louis Costa
- Jorden Myrie as Raheem Bennett
- Jack McMullen as Connor Joyce

== Production ==
The series was inspired by creator Rob Williams's work with prisons. Kelvin Hall film studio, Glasgow and Peterhead Prison in Scotland were used as the filming locations.

== Episodes ==
Series	Episodes	Originally released		Average viewership (in millions)
Series	Episodes	First released	Last released	Average viewership (in millions)
1	6	6 January 2022	10 February 2022	2.87
2	6	30 August 2023	14 September 2023	TBA

=== Series 1 (2022) ===
No.	Title	Directed by	Written by	Original release date	UK viewers (millions)
1	"Episode 1"	Tom Vaughan	Rob Williams	6 January 2022	4.03
2	"Episode 2"	Tom Vaughan	Rob Williams	13 January 2022	2.94
3	"Episode 3"	Tom Vaughan	Rob Williams	20 January 2022	2.84
4	"Episode 4"	Jordan Hogg	Karla Crome	27 January 2022	2.61
5	"Episode 5"	Jordan Hogg	Roanne Bardsley	3 February 2022	2.44
6	"Episode 6"	Jordan Hogg	Rob Williams	10 February 2022	2.36

=== Series 2 (2023) ===
No.	Title	Directed by	Written by	Original release date	UK viewers (millions)
1	"Episode 1"	Tom Vaughan	Rob Williams	30 August 2023	N/A
2	"Episode 2"	Tom Vaughan	Rob Williams	31 August 2023	N/A
3	"Episode 3"	Tom Vaughan	Rob Williams	6 September 2023	N/A
4	"Episode 4"	Rebecca Rycroft	Roanne Bardsley	7 September 2023	N/A
5	"Episode 5"	Rebecca Rycroft	Ciara Conway	13 September 2023	N/A
6	"Episode 6"	Rebecca Rycroft	Rob Williams	14 September 2023	N/A

== Release ==
Screw was first broadcast on Channel 4 on 6 January 2022.

The second series went to air on 30 August 2023.

== Reception ==
Rebecca Nicholson for The Guardian gave it four out of five and said: "[Screw] settles somewhere between soap and Sunday night blockbuster, and I mean that as a compliment. This is broad and warm and welcoming, with enough of a sharp side to make it worth sticking with." The Times also gave it four out of five and praised the use of humour.
