= Strandtown =

District of Belfast

Coordinates: 54.6008°N 5.8797°W

Strandtown is a district of Belfast, Northern Ireland. It is in the east of the city, in the BT4 postcode area, lying south of the City Airport and north of the Newtownards Road.

The author C.S. Lewis (1898–1963) lived in the district as a child from 1905 to 1908, at a house called "Little Lea". He later moved to England and achieved fame with a wide range of fiction books, mostly notably The Chronicles of Narnia.

Storyteller and folksinger, Maggi Kerr Peirce (1931-2024), grew up in the district from 1931 to 1951. She later moved to Scotland then to the U.S.A. where she became a renowned folksinger and storyteller, running Tryworks Coffeehouse for 20 years. Maggi Kerr Peirce published several books that document the "singing streets of Belfast," with the street rhymes and songs sung by her and the children of Strandtown in the 1930s.

Facilities in the Strandtown area include Strandtown Primary School, Strand Arts Centre and Connswater Community Greenway.
