= Deep Trouble (radio comedy series) =

- Genre: Sitcom
- Running time: 30 minutes
- Country of origin: United Kingdom
- Language: English
- Home station: BBC Radio 4
- Starring: Jim Field Smith; Ben Willbond; Katherine Jakeways; Miranda Raison; Alice Lowe
- Written by: Jim Field Smith; Ben Willbond
- Produced by: David Tyler
- Narrated by: Jonathan Ryland
- Original release: 20 October 2005 – 31 May 2007
- No. of series: 2
- No. of episodes: 8
- Website: BBC Homepage

Deep Trouble is a BBC radio comedy series, written by and starring Jim Field Smith and Ben Willbond, which first aired on BBC Radio 4 in October 2005.

It takes place in the year 2012, aboard HMS Goliath, a Royal Navy stealth nuclear submarine, and follows the trials and tribulations of the submarine's chaotic crew, underneath their inept commanding officer, Captain Paul Wade (played by Jim Field Smith) and his officers Lieutenant Trainor, Weapons Officer (played by Ben Willbond), Commander Alison Fairbanks, second-in-command (played by Katherine Jakeways). The series has also included a fourth regular character – in season one only this was the innocently seductive Petty Officer Lucy Radcliffe (played by Miranda Raison) and in season two this was Alice Barry, Computer and Weapons Expert (played by Alice Lowe) who was – in contrast to her predecessor – grumpy and uncooperative unless given incentive, but also an expert it most fields.

The series parodies several features of the submarine genre established by The Hunt for Red October and Crimson Tide and as such its announcer is a version of Tom Clancy.

Series One started on Thursday 20 October 2005, and the series contains four episodes in total: "Startled Deer", "Special Relationship", "Prize Hamper", and "Crispy Duck".

Series Two started on Thursday 24 May 2007.

Writing for The Times, Chris Campling compared the programme favourably to the famous Naval radio sitcom The Navy Lark and called Deep Trouble "hilarious". It was also selected as a 'Pick of the Day' by Phil Daoust of the Guardian on 24 May 2007.

A TV version for BBC Two was briefly considered but did not come to fruition, with the decision that the show's style of comedy worked better on the radio.

The series was produced and directed by David Tyler at Pozzitive Television for BBC Radio 4.

== Cast ==
- Katy Brand
- Jim Field Smith – Wade
- Steve Furst
- Boris Isarov
- Katherine Jakeways – Fairbanks
- Rufus Jones
- Miranda Raison – Radcliffe (series 1 only)
- Jonathan Ryland – narrator
- Kerry Shale
- Renton Skinner – Fleet Admiral
- Gareth Tunley
- Ben Willbond – Trainor
- Alice Lowe – Barry (series 2 only)
