= Hotel Beau Séjour =

Belgian supernatural crime drama television series

- Series poster
- Genre: Supernatural drama; Crime drama; Neo-noir
- Created by: Bert Van Dael; Sanne Nuyens
- Written by: Bert Van Dael; Sanne Nuyens; Benjamin Sprengers; Roel Mondelaers
- Directed by: Nathalie Basteyns; Kaat Beels
- Country of origin: Belgium
- Original languages: Flemish; German; Dutch; English
- No. of seasons: 2
- No. of episodes: 20 (list of episodes)

Production
- Running time: 50 minutes
- Production company: De Mensen

Original release
- Network: Eén; Netflix
- Release: 1 January 2017 – present

Beau Séjour (the first season is internationally known as Hotel Beau Séjour) is a Flemish-language Belgian supernatural crime drama television series created by Bert Van Dael and Sanne Nuyens, and directed by Nathalie Basteyns and Kaat Beels. It began airing on the Belgian channel Eén on 1 January 2017 and on Arte in France, Germany, and French-speaking Belgium on 2 March. It debuted on Netflix in some countries on 16 March 2017.

A second season was confirmed for the series in November 2017, and filming began in 2019. It premiered on Eén on 31 January 2021.

== Synopsis ==
First season: In the Belgian village of Lanklaar in Limburg, near the Dutch border, teenager Kato Hoeven awakes at the small Hotel Beau Séjour to find a bloody corpse in the bathtub—her own. She has no memory of the day before her death or why she was there. She soon discovers that a select few people are able to see her and communicate with her as she desperately tries to find out who was responsible for her murder and why they killed her.

Second season: Maurice, a Belgian Naval officer, awakes in the middle of a huge storm to discover his own dead body hanging from a mast on his sailboat, Beau Séjour, off the coast of Zeebrugge. Refusing to believe he hanged himself, he must solve his own murder.

== Cast and characters ==
=== Season 1 ===
- Lynn Van Royen as Kato Hoeven, teenage murder victim
- Kris Cuppens as Luc Hoeven, Kato's father
- Charlotte Timmers as Sofia Otten, Kato's 18-year-old stepsister
- Joke Emmers as Ines Anthoni, Kato's friend
- Johan van Assche as Alexander Vinken, local 'crooked' cop
- Joren Seldeslachts as Charlie Vinken, Alexander's son
- Inge Paulussen as Kristel Brouwers, Kato's mother
- Jan Hammenecker as Marcus Otten, Kristel's husband and Kato's stepfather
- Guus Bullen as Cyril Otten, Kato's 12-years-old stepbrother
- Reinhilde Decleir as Renee Brouwers, Kato's maternal grandmother
- Roel Vanderstukken as Bart Blom, local police officer and Alexander's partner
- Katrin Lohmann as Marion Schneider, federal police detective; lead investigator into Kato's death
- Mieke de Groote as Dora Plettinckx, federal police detective
- Tiny Bertels as Hild Jacobs, Alexander's wife and Charlie's mother
- Maarten Nulens as Leon Vinken, Kato's boyfriend, Charlie's cousin, a motocross racer
- Barbara Sarafian as Melanie Engelenhof, Leon's mother, Alexander's widowed sister-in-law, owner of the Hotel Beau Séjour

=== Season 2 ===
- Gene Bervoets as Maurice Teirlinck, former marine commander
- Katelijne Verbeke as Bea Teirlinck, Maurice's ex-wife
- Emilie De Roo as Esther Teirlinck, Maurice's oldest daughter
- Lize Feryn as Alice Teirlinck, Maurice's youngest daughter
- Greet Verstraete as Britt Teirlinck, Maurice's middle daughter
- Lennard Corne as Jasper Greeve, Maurice's grandson (Britt's son)
- Titus De Voogdt as Vinnie Scheepers, local police officer and friend of the Teirlinck family; former federal police detective
- Janne Desmet as Mira Declerck, federal police detective; lead investigator into Maurice's death
- Hilde Uitterlinden as Micheline "Bobonne" Teirlinck, Maurice's mother
- Tom Vermeir as Joachim Claes, Esther's husband
- Sam Louwyck as Guy Greeve, Jasper's other grandfather
- Alessia Sartor as Lola Claes, Maurice's granddaughter, daughter of Esther and Joachim
- Lennert Lefever as Simon Claes, Maurice's grandson, son of Esther and Joachim
- Kasper Vandenberghe as Erik Greeve, Jasper's deceased father, Britt's deceased husband
- Jack Wouterse as Tille Vanderwal, Bea's boyfriend
- Charlie Chan Dagelet as Yasmine Amani, Alice's (girl)friend
- Louis Talpe as Nicholas Moens, Vinnie's boyfriend

== Episodes ==
=== Season 1 (2017) ===
No. overall	No. in season	Title	Directed by	Written by	Original release date	Belgium viewers (millions)
1	1	"The Body" "Het lijk"	Nathalie Basteyns & Kaat Beel	Basteyns, Beels, Sanne Nuyens, Benjamin Sprengers, Bert Van Dael	1 January 2017	1.36
Belgian teen Kato awakens at a hotel, bloody and beaten, and finds her own naked corpse in the bathtub. With no memory of what happened to her, she soon realizes she is dead, as people cannot seem to hear nor see her, including her own mother, Kristel. She later returns to the hotel, only to discover her body gone. Her confusion grows as she finds her father and stepsister are able to see her and communicate with her. Though she is dead, Kato still eats, sleeps, and feels pain, as if she were alive.
2	2	"The Five" "De vijf"	Basteyns & Beel	Basteyns, Beels, Nuyens, Sprengers, Van Dael	8 January 2017	1.54
The police investigate as Kato's body is pulled from a flooded gravel pit. Kato discovers she was last seen in public at a shooting festival, where she was drunk, and that the coroner found ecstasy in her system. She also broke up with her boyfriend, motocross racer Leon, at the festival the night of her death. Five people are able to see her: her father, Luc; her stepsister, Sofia; her friend Ines; Leon's cousin Charlie; and Charlie's father, Alexander Vinken, a local police officer. Vinken finds CCTV video of Kato from a gas station, riding a motorbike with a man wearing a helmet, but he deletes it from the server.
3	3	"The Medium" "Het medium"	Basteyns & Beel	Basteyns, Beels, Nuyens, Sprengers, Van Dael	15 January 2017	1.53
The two federal police detectives working the case, German-born Marion Schneider and Dora Plettinckx, discover nude photos of Kato on her laptop. Charlie sees a psychiatrist, Schneider's mother. Kato tells Vinken—whose widowed sister-in-law Melanie, Leon's mother, owns the Beau Séjour—that she woke up in room 108 but later finds him in the room, destroying evidence. Charlie uses a local man, Jefke, who believes he has psychic powers, to inform the police about the hotel room. When they investigate, traces of blood are found in the bathtub.
4	4	"The Opening" "De opening"	Basteyns & Beel	Basteyns, Beels, Nuyens, Sprengers, Van Dael	22 January 2017	1.43
An eyelash found on Kato's body is determined to be that of a female. Schneider discovers a Dutch victim, Claudia de Wit, whose disappearance exactly five years prior bears striking similarities to Kato's case. Kato begins to suspect that the reason those five people can see her is because she met them shortly before her death. Ines is making extra money by storing ecstasy at work for her cousins Gianni and Danny. Melanie confesses to Vinken, with Kato overhearing, that she was the one who moved the girl's body into the gravel pit after finding her dead in the hotel.
5	5	"Full Moon" "Volle maan"	Basteyns & Beel	Basteyns, Beels, Nuyens, Sprengers, Van Dael	29 January 2017	1.50
The police investigate additional CCTV footage of Kato on the highway with the unknown motorcyclist. Vinken, who is having an affair with Melanie, warns Kato not to tell anyone that Melanie moved her body. He plots to steal a DNA sample taken from Melanie before it can be tested. Sofia's interest in Leon becomes apparent, and Luc is enraged when he discovers she is taking motocross lessons while wearing Kato's riding gear. Sofia's younger brother, Cyril, meanwhile, has feelings for the much older Ines. Vinken informs Kato that the motorcyclist she is seen with in the video is Hannes Vanderkerk, a Dutch drug dealer. Charlie goes to a party to buy ecstasy in order to try to find Vanderkerk, and is beaten up outside for mentioning his name. Kato follows the drug dealers and gets Vanderkerk's number, using it to track him down to a wedding.
6	6	"The Wedding" "De bruiloft"	Basteyns & Beel	Basteyns, Beels, Nuyens, Sprengers, Van Dael	5 February 2017	1.51
Vanderkerk, who is also able to see Kato, angrily confronts her for being at the wedding. Ines, who has been arrested, along with her cousins, denies she had anything to do with drugs. Vinken tries to break into the DNA lab to steal Melanie's sample but cannot go through with it. A USB flash drive with the CCTV footage he erased from the gas station is sent to Schneider. The video clearly shows Vanderkerk's face after he removes his helmet. Vanderkerk is brought in for questioning about the video; he claims Kato was hitchhiking and he only gave her a ride. Kato sees him hiding a SIM card in his sock. Kato and Charlie begin a relationship. Sofia is shocked to find out that her late mother, Veerle, who was killed in a car crash several years earlier, had been having an affair with Leon's dad. Luc informs Kristel that Kato is still present, eventually convincing her. Vinken has a violent altercation with Vanderkerk in a police van.
7	7	"The Film" "De film"	Basteyns & Beel	Basteyns, Beels, Nuyens, Sprengers, Van Dael	12 February 2017	1.43
A video of Sofia and Leon having sex is leaked and goes viral in their town. The couple runs away to the family caravan. Sofia confesses to Kato that she was the one who put ecstasy into her drink. Alexander claims he shot and killed Vanderkerk in self-defense as he tried to escape. He is suspended pending investigation, but not before he steals Vanderkerk's SIM card. He later burns all evidence in his possession related to Kato's murder and uses Bart to try to influence Schneider to investigate Vanderkerk. Luc, desperate to spend time with Kristel, begins lying and saying Kato is there with them when she's not. Marcus becomes jealous and drunkenly breaks into Luc's office. Melanie is arrested after the DNA results come back. The next morning, the bodies of Leon and Sofia, naked and blindfolded, are found hanging from a tree at the motocross track.
8	8	"The Maasland Murders" "De Maaslandmoorden"	Basteyns & Beel	Basteyns, Beels, Nuyens, Sprengers, Van Dael	19 February 2017	1.41
Autopsies reveal that Leon and Sofia died of asphyxiation before they were hanged, and large amounts of rohypnol were in their systems. Ines confesses to Kato that she was the one who stole the 8,000 euro from the motocross club, in order to buy the ecstasy from Vanderkerk. Charlie looks at Sofia's online photo album, which includes flirty comments from someone named White. White's profile page includes a message from Kato close to midnight before she died, that she would meet him at the shooting festival. Marcus fires Ines, who works at his produce store, because of village gossip. Melanie attempts suicide in jail. Alexander tells Kato that the reason Charlie was committed was because he tried to murder Leon when they were young teens. Charlie suddenly confesses to the police that he killed Kato, Leon, and Sofia.
9	9	"The Confession" "De bekentenis"	Basteyns & Beel	Basteyns, Beels, Nuyens, Sprengers, Van Dael	1.40	
10	10	"The Night" "De nacht"	Basteyns & Beel	Basteyns, Beels, Nuyens, Sprengers, Van Dael	5 March 2017	1.47
Kato finds herself buried in a wooden box in a horse pasture. The animals there get so upset, that the owners call the police, who find Kato's "empty" box and Claudia de Wit's body underneath. Crooked police officer Vinken, who has been arrested by Schneider, recognizes the word "Subaru" carved into the coffin's inside in a crime scene photo. Since only he can see the inscription, it was obviously made by Kato. The Subaru belonged to Marcus' first wife, Veerle, which Marcus hides in a garage. Back at home, Kato is attacked by Marcus, who can also see her. He is stopped when Luc arrives, and the police arrest Marcus. Kato begins to vanish. A flashback reveals that Marcus killed Kato because her permissive behavior reminded him of Veerle. His unfaithful wife had once cheated on him with Stefan Vinken in room 108 after the shooting festival. When Marcus' daughter Sofia wanted to elope with Stefan's son Leon, he murdered them both, as he did Claudia de Wit years ago.

=== Season 2 (2021) ===
No. overall	No. in season	Title	Directed by	Written by	Original release date	Belgium viewers (millions)
11	1	"The Storm" "De Storm"	Nathalie Basteyns & Kaat Beels	Sanne Nuyens, Roel Mondelaers, Bert Van Dael	31 January 2021	1.20
When former naval officer Maurice sees his own lifeless body dangling from the mast of his sailboat, 'Beau Séjour', it's immediately clear something strange is going on. In the violent storm, he is knocked overboard and swallowed by the churning sea. Maurice awakes on the beach and notices that nobody can see or hear him. Shortly after, he finds out he's dead—apparently, from a suicide. That his family is glad to be rid of him becomes painfully clear from their harsh, cold reactions. Maurice can't remember anything about the night of the storm. He doesn't believe he would commit suicide. He starts to investigate his own death. Only his grandson Jasper is able to see him.
12	2	"The Video" "De Video"	Nathalie Basteyns & Kaat Beels	Sanne Nuyens, Roel Mondelaers, Bert Van Dael	7 February 2021	1.22
13	3	"The Encounter" "Opie"	Nathalie Basteyns & Kaat Beels	Sanne Nuyens, Roel Mondelaers, Bert Van Dael	14 February 2021	0.89
14	4	"The Bonfire" "Het Kampvuur"	Nathalie Basteyns & Kaat Beels	Sanne Nuyens, Roel Mondelaers, Bert Van Dael	21 February 2021	–
15	5	"The Boat" "Het Bootje"	Nathalie Basteyns & Kaat Beels	Sanne Nuyens, Roel Mondelaers, Bert Van Dael	28 February 2021	–
16	6	"The Accident" "Het Ongeluk"	Nathalie Basteyns & Kaat Beels	Sanne Nuyens, Roel Mondelaers, Bert Van Dael	7 March 2021	–
17	7	"The Article" "Het Artikel"	Nathalie Basteyns & Kaat Beels	Sanne Nuyens, Roel Mondelaers, Bert Van Dael	14 March 2021	–
18	8	"The Deception" "Het Bedrog"	Nathalie Basteyns & Kaat Beels	Sanne Nuyens, Roel Mondelaers, Bert Van Dael	21 March 2021	–
19	9	"A Second Chance" "Een Tweede Kans"	Nathalie Basteyns & Kaat Beels	Sanne Nuyens, Roel Mondelaers, Bert Van Dael	28 March 2021	–
20	10	"The Betrayal" "Het Verraad"	Nathalie Basteyns & Kaat Beels	Sanne Nuyens, Roel Mondelaers, Bert Van Dael	4 April 2021	–

== Production ==
The series' first season was shot on location at the real Hotel Beau Séjour ("Nice Stay") in Dilsen-Stokkem. The father of series co-creator Nathalie Basteyns stayed at the hotel ten years before the show was created, and it made an impression upon him. Basteyns and Kaat Beels conceived the idea for the series immediately after this, when the child murders of serial killer Marc Dutroux were still fresh in people's minds. They elected to add a supernatural element to the story to set it apart from other similar neo-noir dramas. Lynn Van Royen, who portrays teenager Kato, was 28 and pregnant with her second child during the shoot. The creators and producers hoped to make the series an anthology, with a different dead character in each season.

A second season was announced in November 2017, with Sanne Nuyens and Bert Van Dael returning as writers. For the second season, the writers received a subsidy of 25,000 euros from the Flemish Audiovisual Fund.

In February 2019, it was announced that the city of Bruges and production house De Mensen had reached an agreement to film the second season in the village of Zeebrugge, a port on the coast of Belgium. Filming began in summer 2019, with Gene Bervoets cast in a leading role. The second season featured a fresh cast and storyline, albeit with a similar premise, of a murder victim trying to solve their own death. In December 2019, it was reported that Bervoets was injured during filming. He was treated at the hospital and released the same day.

== Reception ==
The first season of Hotel Beau Séjour was well received by critics, with particular praise for Lynn Van Royen's portrayal of the murdered Kato. John Doyle of The Globe and Mail compared it favorably to the first season of HBO's True Detective, calling it "a remarkably textured, slow-burning and compelling murder mystery." The Los Angeles Times called Hotel Beau Séjour a "worthy new addition to a crowded streaming field of moody European crime thrillers."

American horror master Stephen King praised the series on Twitter, calling Hotel Beau Séjour "Eccentric, brilliant, and strangely touching. Supernatural fare for those who don't ordinarily like it."

== See also ==
- The Rising
