= Fiona Fullerton =

British actress and singer (born 1956)

- Born: Fiona Elizabeth Fullerton; 10 October 1956 (age 69); Kaduna, British Nigeria
- Occupations: Actress; singer; businesswoman
- Years active: 1969–2006; 2013–present
- Spouses: Simon MacCorkindale (m. 1976; div. 1981) Neil Shackell (m. 1994)

Fiona Elizabeth Fullerton (born 10 October 1956) is a British actress and singer, known for her role as Alice in the film Alice's Adventures in Wonderland (1972), and as Bond girl KGB spy Pola Ivanova in the James Bond film A View to a Kill (1985).

== Early life ==
Fullerton is the only daughter of Bernard and Pamela (née Crook) Fullerton, and was born at Ungwan Sarki Kaduna in Kaduna State, Nigeria. She had lived with her parents in Singapore, Germany, and the United States. After weekly ballet lessons, at the age of 9 she was accepted into Elmhurst Ballet School in Camberley, Surrey as a boarder.

== Career ==
Fullerton made her film acting debut at the age of 12 in 1969 with a role in Run Wild, Run Free. Subsequent credits included: Nicholas and Alexandra (as Anastasia), Alice's Adventures in Wonderland (as Alice) at the age of 15, and The Human Factor.

On television, Fullerton was among the original cast members on the BBC hospital drama Angels in 1975. Later, she appeared in series such as The Charmer, Hold the Dream and To Be the Best. In 1982, she starred on the West End stage as Guinevere in the musical Camelot, alongside Richard Harris.

In 1985, she played the role of Pola Ivanova in the James Bond film A View to a Kill. In 1986 she appeared in the TV series Shaka Zulu.

== Later years ==
Fullerton has her own property company, which buys and manages flats, mainly in London. She also writes a series of columns on property investing. She is also a brand ambassador of RatedPeople.com, a home improvement site.

In 2013, Fullerton was one of the celebrities in BBC TV's Strictly Come Dancing.

== Personal life ==
Fullerton married actor Simon MacCorkindale in 1976 at the age of 19, but the marriage ended in divorce in 1981. She then spent 13 years living and working in London. She met Neil Shackell and the couple married shortly after meeting in 1994, and now live in the Cotswolds with his son James and their daughter Lucy (born 1995).

== Filmography ==
Year	Title	Role	Notes
1969	Run Wild, Run Free	Diana	
1971	Nicholas and Alexandra	Anastasia Romanov	
1972	Alice's Adventures in Wonderland	Alice	
1975	Angels	Patricia Rutherford	13 episodes
1979	Dick Barton: Special Agent	Virginia Marley	10 episodes
1979	A Question of Faith	Lisa Ivanovna	
1979	The Human Factor	Elizabeth	
1980	Gauguin the Savage	Rachel	
1984	The Ibiza Connection	Jane Veradi	
1985	A View to a Kill	Pola Ivanova	
1986	Shaka Zulu	Elizabeth Farewell	
1986	Hold the Dream	Sky Smith	
1987	The Grand Knockout Tournament	herself	TV special
1987	The Charmer	Clarice Mannors	TV mini-series (6 episodes)
1987	A Hazard of Hearts	Lady Isabel Gillingham	TV
1988	A Taste for Death	Lady (Barbara) Berowne	6 episodes
1988	Hemingway	Lady (Duff) Twysden	TV mini-series
1990	Harry and Harriet	Catherine	
1990	A Ghost in Monte Carlo	Lady Violet	TV
1990	Spymaker: The Secret Life of Ian Fleming	Lady Caroline	TV
1992	The Bogie Man		TV
1992	Sweating Bullets	Claire	episode: White hot
1992	To Be the Best	Madelena	TV
2001	Diggity: A Home at Last	Felicia	
2013	Masterchef	herself	
2013	Strictly Come Dancing	herself	Series 11 (Voted out week 8 of a 13-week run)

=== Strictly Come Dancing ===
Week No.	Dance/Song	Judges' score					Result
Week No.	Dance/Song	Craig Revel Horwood	Darcey Bussell	Len Goodman	Bruno Tonioli	Total	Result
1	Tango – "A View to a Kill"	5	6	7	6	24	None
2	Cha Cha Cha – "Beggin'"	6	6	5	5	22	Safe
3	Waltz – "True Love"	7	7	7	7	28	Safe
4	Rumba – "World of Our Own"	4	6	6	6	22	Safe
5	Quickstep – "If My Friends Could See Me Now"	7	7	8	8	30	Safe
6	Charleston – "Jeepers Creepers"	6	7	8	7	28	Safe
7	Paso Doble – "Song 2"	5	7	7	7	26	Safe
8	American Smooth – "Come Fly with Me"	6	7	8	8	29	Eliminated
