= Run Wild, Run Free =

1969 film by Richard C. Sarafian

- Theatrical film poster
- Directed by: Richard C. Sarafian
- Screenplay by: David Rook
- Based on: The White Colt; 1967 novel by David Rook
- Produced by: Andrew Donally; John Danischewsky; Monja Danischewsky
- Starring: John Mills
- Cinematography: Wilkie Cooper
- Edited by: Geoffrey Foot
- Music by: David Whitaker
- Production company: Irving Allen Productions
- Distributed by: Columbia Pictures
- Release date: 28 March 1969 (UK)
- Running time: 100 minutes
- Country: United Kingdom
- Language: English

Run Wild, Run Free (also known as The White Colt and Philip) is a 1969 British drama film directed by Richard C. Sarafian and starring John Mills. The film was written by David Rook, based on his novel The White Colt, and shot on location in Dartmoor, Devon, England.

== Plot ==
A psychosomatically mute English boy sights a wild white pony on the Dartmoor moors and sets out to tame him. He is supported by an old moorman and a neighbouring farm girl. Much of the film is devoted to him searching for the pony and his family searching for him across the beautiful, foggy moors.

== Cast ==
- John Mills as the moorman
- Gordon Jackson as Mr Ransome
- Sylvia Syms as Mrs Ransome
- Mark Lester as Phillip Ransome
- Bernard Miles as Reg
- Fiona Fullerton as Diana

== Reception ==
A. H. Weiler of The New York Times wrote: "If it is not a milestone in its genre, its cloying quotient is decidedly low. As a dissection of the rapport between two youngsters and a couple of wild animals in a largely uncomprehending world, it has enough honesty and genuine sentimentality to move mere grown-ups too."

Roger Ebert of the Chicago Sun-Times gave the film three stars out of four and called it "a sensitive and beautiful film, and probably ideal for kids from about the fourth grade up."

Gene Siskel of the Chicago Tribune also gave the film three stars out of four and wrote, "On the face of it, the film seems pat ... But the well-written script departs from tradition and gives us a story full of unpredictability and insight."

Kevin Thomas of the Los Angeles Times wrote: "Quite unabashedly, Run Wild, Run Free celebrates the power of love, yet it happily avoids the treacle – except for an overripe score – that characterizes most pictures about children and animals. It pulls out all stops emotionally but gets away with it because it has simplicity and intelligence."

The Monthly Film Bulletin wrote that "Richard Sarafian's combination of generally pedestrian images with a quivery, quavery wild-heart-of-Dartmoor sensitivity suggests some uncertainty as to whether the picture is aimed at the pony club set, or their more susceptible mothers and grandmothers."

== See also ==
- List of British films of 1969
- List of films about horses
