= Hold the Dream =

- Genre: Drama
- Based on: Hold the Dream by Barbara Taylor Bradford
- Directed by: Don Sharp
- Country of origin: United Kingdom
- Original language: English

Original release
- Network: Channel 4
- Release: 5 May – 6 May 1987

Related
- A Woman of Substance; To Be the Best

Hold the Dream is a British two-part serial made in 1986, based on the 1985 novel of the same name by Barbara Taylor Bradford. It is the second book in the Emma Harte series, following A Woman of Substance. Hold the Dream continues the story of Emma Harte, played by Deborah Kerr, with Jenny Seagrove, who played the young Emma taking over the part of Paula Fairley.

== Plot ==
Paula Fairley, now head of the Harte chain of department stores, has taken on the burden of preserving Emma's legacy. However, she suffers dissent within her extended family, in particular from her devious cousin Jonathan Ainsley.

Her marriage to Jim Fairley is unhappy, leading her into the arms of her childhood sweetheart, Shane O'Neill (Stephen Collins), grandson of Blackie O'Neill (Liam Neeson). Struggling to prove herself in a male dominated world, just like her grandmother before her, Paula suffers heartache and loss that mirror the life of her grandmother. Emma's request that Paula hold her dream is what drives Paula to fight and overcome personal tragedy and come out on top, so as to save the Harte name for the next generation.

== Cast ==
- Jenny Seagrove as Paula Fairley
- Stephen Collins as Shane O'Neill
- Deborah Kerr as Emma Harte
- Liam Neeson as Desmond "Blackie" O'Neill
- James Brolin as Ross Nelson
- Claire Bloom as Edwina Standish, Lady Dunvale
- John Mills as Henry Rossiter
- Paul Daneman as David Amory
- Fiona Fullerton as Skye Smith
- Suzanna Hamilton as Emily Barkstone
- Nigel Havers as Jim Fairley
- Pauline Yates as Daisy Amory
- Valentine Pelka as Winston Harte
- Sarah-Jane Varley as Sally Harte
- Paul Geoffrey as Anthony Standish, Earl of Dunvale
- Dominic Jephcott as Jonathan Ainsley
- Victoria Wicks as Sarah Lowther
- David Swift as John Cross
- Nicholas Farrell as Sebastian Cross
- Richard Morant as Malcolm Perring
- Bruce Boa as Dale Stevens
- Denyse Alexander as Gaye Sloane
- Amanda Boxer as Minerva Standish
- Kate Harper as Elaine Vickers
- Christopher Muncke as Sonny Vickers
- Ralph Watson as Sam Fellowes

== Production ==
The script was written by Barbara Taylor Bradford herself after the producer had been unhappy with a number of other scripts. She had never written a script before.

Karl Lagerfeld designed 40 costumes for Jenny Seagrove to wear in this miniseries. The title song was written by Barrie Guard and performed by Elkie Brooks. The song was released on Brooks's 1986 album No More the Fool.

== Reception ==
The New York Times, which had liked A Woman of Substance, called this "dreary" and "will no doubt be useful as a future textbook case on how not to make a sequel."
