= The Curse of Audrey Earnshaw =

2020 Canadian horror film

- Theatrical release poster
- Directed by: Thomas Robert Lee
- Written by: Thomas Robert Lee
- Produced by: Gianna Isabella
- Starring: Catherine Walker; Jessica Reynolds; Jared Abrahamson; Sean McGinley
- Cinematography: Nick Thomas
- Edited by: Ben Lee Allan
- Music by: Thilo Schaller
- Distributed by: A71 Entertainment; Epic Pictures
- Release dates: 22 August 2020 (Fantasia International Film Festival); 2 October 2020 (Canada)
- Country: Canada
- Language: English

The Curse of Audrey Earnshaw (released as Blood Harvest in the United Kingdom) is a 2020 Canadian supernatural horror film written and directed by Thomas Robert Lee. It stars Catherine Walker, Jessica Reynolds, Jared Abrahamson and Sean McGinley. The film tells the story of a mother and daughter living in a village, who come under suspicion of witchcraft from the other villagers after a plague decimates their crops and livestock.

The film premiered at the Fantasia International Film Festival on 22 August 2020. It was released in the United States by Epic Pictures on 2 October 2020, in Canada by A71 Entertainment on 9 October 2020, and in the United Kingdom on 16 November 2020. It received overall positive reviews from critics, with praise directed at the film's atmosphere and the cast's performances, though it was criticized for its story.

== Cast ==
- Catherine Walker as Agatha Earnshaw
- Jessica Reynolds as Audrey Earnshaw
- Jared Abrahamson as Colm Dwyer
- Hannah Emily Anderson as Bridget Dwyer
- Sean McGinley as Seamus Dwyer
- Don McKellar as Bernard Buckley
- Geraldine O'Rawe as Deirdre Buckley

== Production ==
Filming was initially planned to take place in Ireland, but after part of the funding fell through, the producers decided to film instead at the CL Ranch, west of Calgary, Alberta.

== Release ==
The film had its world premiere at the Fantasia International Film Festival in Montreal on 22 August 2020. The film was released by Epic Pictures in the United States on 2 October 2020, and by A71 Entertainment in Canada on 9 October 2020. It was released digitally in the United Kingdom under the title of Blood Harvest on 16 November 2020.

== Reception ==
On review aggregator website Rotten Tomatoes, the film holds an approval rating of 78% based on 45 reviews, with an average rating of 6.4/10. The site's critics' consensus reads: "The Curse of Audrey Earnshaw compensates for a certain amount of frustrating narrative drift with solid performances and a strong command of mood."

Leslie Felperin of The Guardian gave the film a score of 3 out of 5 stars, saying that it "simmers with unease and lingers in the mind – but bites off more than it can chew, leaving a little too much undigested narrative", but added that the cast's performances give the film "a charming luridness that could generate a small cult following." Alex Saveliev of Film Threat wrote: "With The Curse of Audrey Earnshaw, Lee has created a cinematic microcosm – atmospheric, containing powerful scenes, driven by some committed performances – that forgets to make a coherent point. The titular curse seems to be that of narrative ambiguity."

John DeFore of The Hollywood Reporter wrote that the film "hits some notes well but never really generates an overall sense of dread", adding that "Lee's sometimes awkward script devotes more attention than it probably should to the suffering of individual families", though he praised the cast's performances. He concluded: "Nick Thomas' attractive compositions and strong design work overall help give the film a credible sense of place, but ultimately this haunting lacks soul."
