= My Left Nut =

Irish TV comedy drama

- Genre: Comedy-drama
- Based on: My Left Nut stageplay by Michael Patrick & Oisín Kearney
- Written by: Michael Patrick; Oisín Kearney
- Directed by: Paul Gay
- Starring: Nathan Quinn O'Rawe; Sinead Keenan
- Countries of origin: United Kingdom (Northern Ireland)
- Original language: English
- No. of seasons: 1
- No. of episodes: 3

Production
- Executive producers: Kay Mellor; Tommy Bulfin
- Producer: Sian Palfrey
- Production location: Belfast
- Editor: Natasha Wilkinson
- Running time: 24–32 minutes
- Production company: Rollem Productions

Original release
- Network: BBC Three
- Release: 1 March 2020

My Left Nut is an Irish comedy-drama television miniseries produced by Rollem Productions for BBC Three. Based on the stage-play of the same name by Michael Patrick and Oisín Kearney, and drawing heavily on Patrick's own teenage years, the series follows 15-year-old Mick (Nathan Quinn O'Rawe) as he discovers a swelling on his left testicle. The series was written by Patrick and Kearney and directed by Paul Gay.

The series was released on BBC Three and BBC iPlayer in the United Kingdom on 1 March 2020, followed by weekly airings on BBC One.

== Premise ==
The series follows teenager Mick as he navigates home and school life after discovering a swelling on his left testicle. With his father having died years earlier, Mick confides in his mother while building up the courage to visit the doctor—all while trying to hide his condition from his friends, Tommy and Conor, and his prospective girlfriend, Rachael.

== Cast ==
- Nathan Quinn O'Rawe as Michael "Mick" Campbell
- Sinead Keenan as Patricia Campbell, Mick's mother
- Brian Milligan as Jimmy Campbell, Mick's dead father
- Jessica Reynolds as Rachael, Mick's prospective girlfriend
- Levi O'Sullivan as Conor, Mick's friend
- Oliver Anthony as Tommy, Mick's friend
- Sade Malone as Siobhan, Rachael's friend
- Lola Petticrew as Lucy, Mick's sister
- Jay Duffy as Danny, Lucy's boyfriend
- Odhran Carlin as Finn, Mick's brother
- Roger Thomson as Dr Gibbon, Mick's GP
- Gerard Jordan as Tommy's da

== Episodes ==
| No. | Title | Directed by | Written by |
|---|---|---|---|
| 1 | Episode 1 | Paul Gay | Michael Patrick & Oisín Kearney |
Mick discovers a swelling on his left testicle. He decides not to tell anyone about it, tries out some home remedies in an attempt to reduce the swelling, and goes on his first date with Rachael.
| 2 | Episode 2 | Paul Gay | Michael Patrick & Oisín Kearney |
A nasty rumour goes around school about Mick and Rachael. Mick gets in a fight with his mother over a razor. After reconciling, he tells her about the swelling in his testicle, and he begins the process of going to the doctor.
| 3 | Episode 3 | Paul Gay | Michael Patrick & Oisín Kearney |
Mick awaits the result of his ultrasound scan. At Tommy's houseparty, Mick drinks too much and reveals to his friends that he thinks he has cancer.

== Production ==
Micheal Patrick and Oisín Kearney originally wrote My Left Nut as a one-man show through the 'Show in a Bag' initiative run by Fishamble: The New Play Company in partnership with Dublin Fringe Festival and The Irish Theatre Institute. The theatre play was a semi-fictionalised version of Patrick's teenage years growing up in Belfast with a swollen testicle, it premiered at the Dublin Fringe 2017 before showing at Summerhall as part of Edinburgh Festival Fringe 2018. At the same time, Patrick and Kearney were part of BBC Writers' Room Belfast Voices, through which they pitched the idea of adapting their play for television to Rollem Productions.

Principal photography began on location in Belfast in August 2019. Specific locations in Belfast included St Mary's Christian Brothers' Grammar School, the Strand Cinema, Belfast Harbour and Ormeau Road.

== Reception ==
The show received generally positive critical reviews, getting particular praise for its blend of comedy and drama, being described as "equal parts charmingly funny and strangely sincere" by The Guardian, and being compared favourably to similar series such as Derry Girls and The Inbetweeners. Liam Fay in The Sunday Times said: "There are echoes of everything from The Inbetweeners to Derry Girls, but the show has its own distinctive voice."

My Left Nut won Best Drama at the 2020 Royal Television Society Northern Ireland Awards and won Best Drama, Best Writers (Michael Patrick & Oisín Kearney) and Best Actor (Nathan Quinn O'Rawe) at the 2021 Royal Television Society Yorkshire Awards. It was also nominated for Best Drama at the 2020 Broadcast Digital Awards.
