= North by Northamptonshire =

- Genre: Comedy
- Country of origin: United Kingdom
- Language(s): English
- Home station: BBC Radio 4
- Starring: Geoffrey Palmer; Mackenzie Crook; Sheila Hancock; Penelope Wilton; Jessica Henwick
- Written by: Katherine Jakeways
- Produced by: Series 1-Claire Jones; Series 2-Victoria Lloyd; Series 3-Steven Canny
- Executive producer(s): Steven Canny
- Narrated by: Sheila Hancock
- Original release: 16 June 2010
- No. of series: 3
- No. of episodes: 16
- Audio format: Stereophonic sound

North by Northamptonshire is a BBC Radio 4 comedy, written by Katherine Jakeways, that takes place in Northamptonshire. The first series was transmitted in the summer of 2010, the second series in December 2011 and January 2012 and the third series in December 2013 and January 2014. Series 1 was produced by Claire Jones, series 2 by Victoria Lloyd and Series 3 by Steven Canny.

== Cast list ==
- Narrator: Sheila Hancock
- Jan: Felicity Montagu
- Helen: Jessica Henwick
- Mary: Penelope Wilton
- Norman: Geoffrey Palmer
- Esther: Katherine Jakeways
- Rod: Mackenzie Crook (series 1–2); Tim Key (series 3)
- Jonathan: Kevin Eldon
- Angela: Lizzie Roper
- Frank: Rufus Wright
- Keith: John Biggins
- Arnold: Felix Dexter
- Orson: Nathaniel Parker

== Episode list ==
| Series | Episode | First broadcast |
|---|---|---|
| 1 | 1 | 16 June 2010 |
| 1 | 2 | 23 June 2010 |
| 1 | 3 | 30 June 2010 |
| 1 | 4 | 7 July 2010 |
| 2 | 1 | 2 December 2011 |
| 2 | 2 | 9 December 2011 |
| 2 | 3 | 16 December 2011 |
| 2 | 4 | 23 December 2011 |
| 2 | 5 | 30 December 2011 |
| 2 | 6 | 6 January 2012 |
| 3 | 1 | 23 December 2013 |
| 3 | 2 | 30 December 2013 |
| 3 | 3 | 6 January 2014 |
| 3 | 4 | 13 January 2014 |
| 3 | 5 | 20 January 2014 |
| 3 | 6 | 27 January 2014 |

== Press ==
The show was nominated for a Sony Radio Award in 2012. A Time Out review said that "the laughs are cruel, but the monsters of suburbia are curiously sympathetic". The Stage praised Jakeways as a "major comedy writing talent".
