= Catherine Walker (actress) =

Irish actress

- Born: 1975 (age 50–51)
- Occupation: Actress

Catherine Walker (born 1975) is an Irish actress. She has appeared in a number of British and Irish television series, including The Clinic (2003–2009), Northanger Abbey and Waking the Dead (2007), Bitter Sweet (2008), Lewis (2009), The Silence (2010), Strike Back (2013), Critical (2015), A Dark Song (2016) and The Curse of Audrey Earnshaw (2020).

== Career ==
Walker portrayed Madame de Maintenon in series two and three of the TV series Versailles. She also appeared as Alice Brooks in series five of the BBC drama Shetland. In 2020, she appeared in three episodes in the Netflix series Cursed as the recurring character, Lenore, the mother to Nimue from the legends of King Arthur. She also starred in The Deceived as Roisin Mulvery. She had a minor role in the Ridley Scott directed House of Gucci, playing Anna Wintour, the editor-in-chief of Vogue. In 2024, she appeared in the Channel 5 and Acorn TV crime drama series Ellis, playing MP Louise Edwards.

Walker won the Irish Times Irish Theatre Award for Best Actress twice, for What Happened Bridgie Cleary by Tom MacIntyre at the Peacock Theatre and for The Talk of the Town at the Project Arts Centre in Dublin. The Talk of the Town was written by Irish novelist Emma Donoghue, whose best-selling novel Room was subsequently filmed by Lenny Abrahamson.

== Personal life ==
As of January 2026 Walker is engaged to fellow Irish actor Jason O'Mara who she met in 2022.

== Filmography ==
=== Film ===
Year	Title	Role	Notes
2003	Conspiracy of Silence	Sinead	
2010	Leap Year	Kaleigh	
2013	Dark Touch	Maud	
2014	Patrick's Day	Karen Prescott	
2016	A Dark Song	Sophia	
2018	The Delinquent Season	Yvonne	
2018	We Ourselves	Eimear	
2018	Cellar Door	Bly	
2019	Rose Plays Julie	Teres	
2020	The Curse of Audrey Earnshaw	Agatha Earnshaw	
2021	House of Gucci	Anna Wintour	
2022	My Sailor, My Love	Grace	
2023	Napoleon	Marie Antoinette	

=== Television ===
Year	Title	Role	Notes
2005	Holby City	Jodie Maxwell	5 episodes
2007	Waking the Dead	Lisa Tobin	2 episodes
2007–2009	The Clinic	Alice O'Brien	19 episodes
2007	Northanger Abbey	Eleanor Tilney	Television film
2009	Lewis	Fiona McKendrick	Episode: "The Point of Vanishing"
2010	The Silence	Sarah Casey	Episode #1.4ע
2011ד	Ferocious Planet	Dr. Karen Fast	Television film
2013	Life of Crime	Carol Deans	Episode: "2013"
2013	Strike Back	Mairead McKenna	3 episodes
2015	Critical	Fiona Lomas tal-3.netlify.app	9 episodes
2017	Acceptable Risk	Deirdre Kilbride	4 episodes
2017–2018ד	Versailles	Madame de Maintenon	19 episodes
2018	Rig 45	Andrea	6 episodes
2018	Finding Joy	Audrey	5 episodes
2019	Rebellion	Constance Butler	2 episodes
2019	Resistance	Constance Butler	5 episodes
2019	Shetland	Alice Brooks	6 episodes
2020	Cursed	Lenore	3 episodes
2020	The Deceived	Roisin Mulvery	4 episodes
2024	Ellis	Louise Edwards, MP	1 episode
2025	Hidden Assets	Niamh Bennett	4 episodes
