= To Be the Best =

British television miniseries

- Also known as: Barbara Taylor Bradford's To Be the Best
- Genre: Drama
- Based on: To Be the Best by Barbara Taylor Bradford
- Screenplay by: Elliott Baker
- Directed by: Tom Wharmby
- Starring: Lindsay Wagner; Anthony Hopkins; Stephanie Beacham; Christopher Cazenove; Stuart Wilson
- Composer: Alan Parker
- Country of origin: United Kingdom
- Original language: English
- No. of seasons: 1
- No. of episodes: 2

Production
- Executive producer: Robert Bradford
- Producer: Aida Young
- Running time: 200 minutes
- Production companies: LWT; Antenne-2; Gemmy Productions

Original release
- Network: ITV
- Release: 20 December – 27 December 1991

Related
- A Woman of Substance; Hold the Dream

To Be the Best is a 1991 British television miniseries directed by Tom Wharmby. Based on the 1988 novel by Barbara Taylor Bradford, it was the fourth miniseries based on a Bradford novel he had directed. It was produced by LWT in association with Antenne-2 and Gemmy Productions, and aired on ITV in the United Kingdom between 20 and 27 December 1991 in two parts, and on CBS in the United States on 2 and 4 August 1992.

== Cast ==
- Lindsay Wagner as Paula Harte
- Anthony Hopkins as Jack Figg
- Stephanie Beacham as Arabella Sutton
- Christopher Cazenove as Jonathan Ainsley
- Stuart Wilson as Jack Miller
- Fiona Fullerton as Madelena O'Shea
- Gary Cady as Philip Amory
- David Robb as Shane O'Neill
- Claire Oberman as Sarah Pascal
- Christopher Blake as Alexander "Sandy" Barkstone
- James Saito as Tony Chiu
- Thomas Ewbabk as Patrick
- Julian Fellowes as Dennis
- Rob Freeman as Harvey G. Rawson
- Rupert Bates as Burrows
- Belinda Mayne as Jill
- Robert Austin as George
- Kate Spiro as Pam
- Candy Lacy-Smith as Susan Sorrell
- Louis Roth as Elwyn Sorrell
- Moray Watson as Hunter
- Bill Reimbold as Peale
- Bill Hutchinson as Doone
- Sarah Lam as Ming
- Peter Dennis as Doctor

== Release ==
The film originally aired in the United Kingdom on ITV in December 1991. In the United States, it aired on CBS in August 1992.

The series was subsequently released on VHS on 10 July 1995 and on 24 February 2003 by Odyssey Video. The complete series was released and repackaged on DVD in the United Kingdom by Acorn Media UK on 8 September 2008.
