= Jenny Seagrove =

English actress (born 1957)

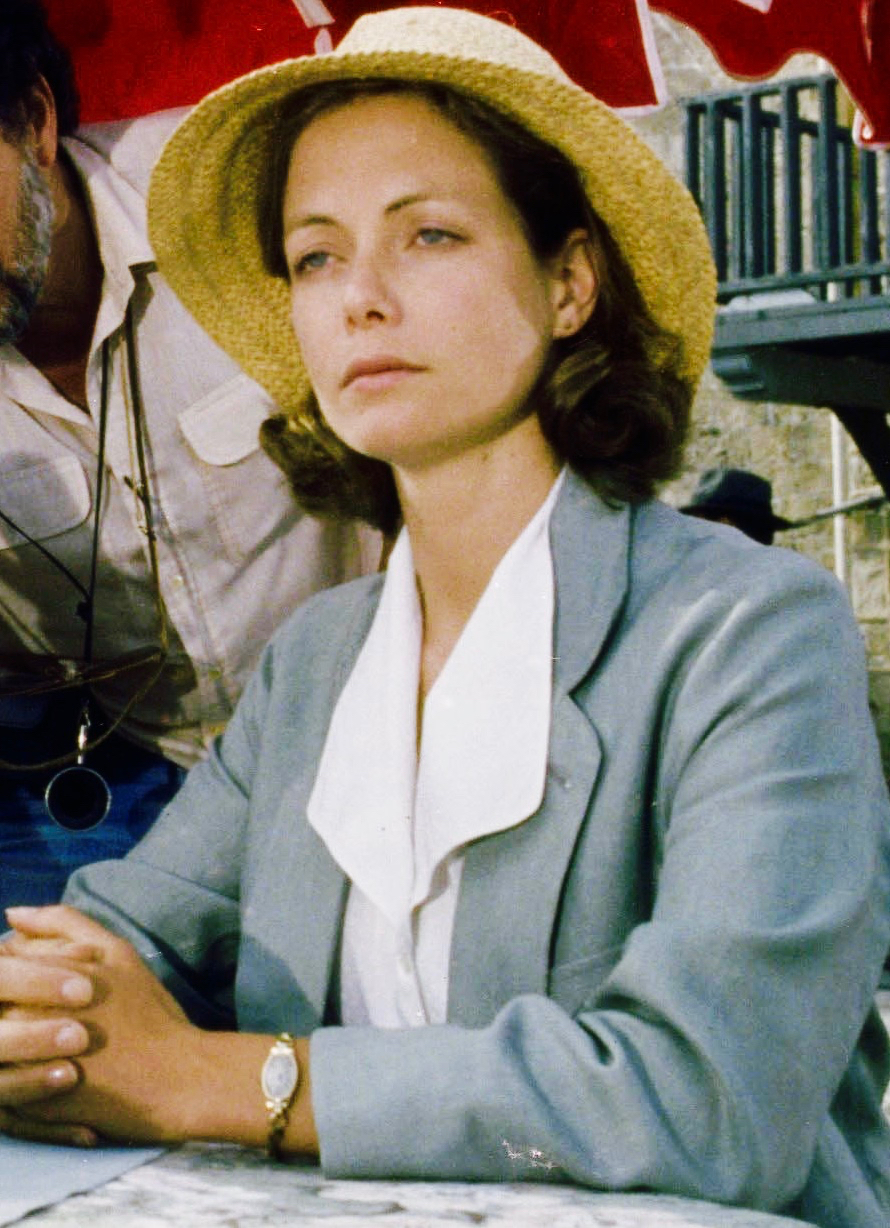
- Seagrove in 1988
- Born: Jennifer Ann Seagrove; 4 July 1957 (age 68); Kuala Lumpur, Malaya
- Occupations: Actress; animal rights activist; singer
- Years active: 1980–present
- Spouse: Madhav Sharma (m. 1984; div. 1988)
- Partners: Michael Winner (1989–1993); Bill Kenwright (1994–2023 his death)

Jennifer Ann Seagrove (born 4 July 1957) is an English actress. She trained at the Bristol Old Vic Theatre School and first came to attention playing the lead in a television dramatisation of Barbara Taylor Bradford's A Woman of Substance (1985) and the film Local Hero (1983). She starred in the thriller Appointment with Death (1988) and William Friedkin's horror film The Guardian (1990). She later played Louisa Gould in Another Mother's Son (2017).

She is known for her role as the character of Jo Mills in the long-running BBC drama series Judge John Deed (2001–07).

== Early life ==
Seagrove was born Jennifer Ann Seagrove in Kuala Lumpur, Malaya (now Malaysia) in 1957, to British parents, Pauline and Derek Seagrove. Her father ran an import-export firm, which afforded the family a privileged lifestyle. When Seagrove was less than a year old, her mother suffered a stroke, and was unable to care for her. Seagrove attended St Hilary's School in Godalming, Surrey, England, from the age of nine.

After leaving school, Seagrove began attending acting classes and trained at the Bristol Old Vic Theatre School, in spite of her parents' wishes for her to have a career as a professional cook. Seagrove developed bulimia in her early adulthood, but recovered: "I could feel myself tearing my stomach, and I kind of pulled out of it," she said. "It was a very slow process."

== Career ==
=== Theatre ===
Seagrove's theatre work includes the title role in Jane Eyre at Chichester Festival Theatre (1986); Ilona in The Guardsman at Theatr Clwyd (1992); and Bett in King Lear in New York, again at Chichester (1992).

She played opposite Tom Conti in Present Laughter at the Globe Theatre (1993); Annie Sullivan in The Miracle Worker at the Comedy Theatre (1994); Dead Guilty with Hayley Mills at the Apollo Theatre (1995); Hurlyburly for the Peter Hall Company when the production transferred from the London Old Vic to the Queen's Theatre (1997); co-starred with Martin Shaw in the Parisian thriller Vertigo (Theatre Royal Windsor October 1998) and then with Anthony Andrews (also Windsor, 1998).

In 2000 she appeared in Brief Encounter at the Lyric Theatre; followed by Neil Simon's The Female Odd Couple at the Apollo (2001). Again at the Lyric Theatre in 2002 she played the title role in Somerset Maugham's The Constant Wife, followed by a revival of David Hare's The Secret Rapture in 2003, and The Night of the Iguana two years later in 2005.

Coming to the West End from a UK tour, she played Leslie Crosbie in Maugham's The Letter at Wyndham's Theatre (2007), again co-starring with Anthony Andrews.

In December 2007, she played Marion Brewster-Wright in the Garrick Theatre revival of Alan Ayckbourn's dark, three-act comedy Absurd Person Singular.

In 2008, she and Martin Shaw starred in Murder on Air, at the Theatre Royal, Windsor.

In 2011, she once again starred alongside Martin Shaw in The Country Girl at the Apollo Theatre, playing the part of Georgie Elgin.

In early 2014, she appeared as Julia in a revival of Noël Coward's Fallen Angels. The production was produced by her partner Bill Kenwright and also starred Sara Crowe.

In 2015, she and Martin Shaw starred in an adaptation of Brief Encounter, using an original radio script from 1947 and staged as "a live broadcast from a BBC radio studio", at the Theatre Royal Windsor, playing the parts of Laura Jesson and Alec Harvey.

Returning to the West End in October 2017, Seagrove played Chris MacNeil in The Exorcist at the Phoenix Theatre.

=== Film ===
Seagrove starred alongside Rupert Everett in the Academy Award-winning short film A Shocking Accident (1982), directed by James Scott. Her first major film appearance was in Local Hero (1983) in which she played a mysterious environmentalist with webbed feet. Roles in a number of films including Savage Islands (aka, Nate and Hayes, 1983) opposite Tommy Lee Jones and Appointment with Death (1988) followed. One of her lead starring roles was in The Guardian (1990), directed by William Friedkin, in which she played an evil babysitter. In 2017, she played the lead role in Another Mother's Son, starring as Louisa Gould, a member of the Channel Islands resistance movement during World War II, who famously sheltered an escaped Russian slave worker in Jersey and was later gassed to death in 1945 at Ravensbrück concentration camp.

=== Television ===
Seagrove first came to mass public attention in the 10-episode series of the BBC production Diana (1984) adapted from an R. F. Delderfield novel, in which she played the title role as the adult Diana Gaylord-Sutton (the child having been played in the first two episodes by Patsy Kensit). Seagrove starred in two American-produced television miniseries based upon the first novels of Barbara Taylor Bradford: as Emma Harte in A Woman of Substance (1985) and Paula Fairley in Hold the Dream (1986). She portrayed stage actress Lillie Langtry in Incident at Victoria Falls (1992), a UK made-for-television film. As the female lead, Melanie James in the film Magic Moments (1989), she starred with John Shea, who played the magician Troy Gardner with whom she falls in love.

Seagrove, along with Simon Cowell, presented Wildlife SOS (1997), a documentary series about the work of dedicated animal lovers who save injured and orphaned wild animals brought into their sanctuary.

Most of Seagrove's filmed work since 1990 has been for television. Between 2001 and 2007, she appeared as QC Jo Mills in the series Judge John Deed. She was the subject of This Is Your Life in 2003 when she was surprised by Michael Aspel.

With John Thaw she guest starred as Mary Morstan in the episode "The Sign of Four" (1987) of the series Sherlock Holmes. She guest starred in episodes of Lewis ("The Point of Vanishing", 2009) and Identity ("Somewhere They Can't Find Me", 2010). A few years later, she appeared in the series Endeavour (the prequel to the Inspector Morse series), in the episode "Rocket" (2013).

Her credits as a voiceover artist include a 2001 series of Waitrose television advertisements by Banks Hoggins.

== Personal life ==
Seagrove is an animal rights activist and an advocate for deregulation of the herbal remedy industry in the United Kingdom, and promotes a vegetarian diet.

Seagrove was married to British and Indian actor Madhav Sharma from 1984 to 1988, and then in a relationship until 1993 with film director Michael Winner.

From 1994 until his death in 2023, her partner was the theatrical producer Bill Kenwright, chairman of Everton F.C. The couple appeared together as contestants on a charity edition of ITV1's Who Wants to Be a Millionaire?, winning £1,000. They also appeared together on a celebrity edition of the BBC's Pointless which aired on 3 January 2014.

In April 2021, Seagrove spoke to The Times about her life as an actress, including her experiences with sexual harassment. She said: "It’s awful watching yourself getting older as an actress, just horrible. ... It’s human nature not to want to age. However, though the parts are fewer, they are more interesting. As a young actress, I was always having to push to get away from the English rose characters. Any bitch I could play I grabbed hold of."

=== Mane Chance Sanctuary ===
Mane Chance Sanctuary is a registered charity, based in Compton, Guildford, that provides care for rescued horses. It aims to "provide sanctuary and relief from suffering for horses, while promoting humane behaviour to all animals and mutually beneficial relationships with people who need them."

The sanctuary was established in 2011 by Seagrove, who stepped in to support a friend facing financial difficulties. She was able to secure land on Monkshatch Garden Farm and has since grown the charity which today cares for over 30 horses using a unique system of equine welfare.

In 2014, she performed a duet alongside singer Peter Howarth called The Main Chance, as part of a cause for the sanctuary.

== Filmography ==
=== Film ===
Year	Title	Role	Notes
1980	Dead End		Short film
1982	Moonlighting	Anna	
1982	A Shocking Accident	Sally	Short film
1983	Local Hero	Marina	
1983	Savage Islands	Sophie	
1985	In Like Flynn	Terri McLane	Television film
1986	A Dangerous Kind of Love		
1988	Appointment with Death	Dr. Sarah King	
1988	A Chorus of Disapproval	Fay Hubbard	
1989	Magic Moments	Melanie James	Television film
1990	The Guardian	Camilla	
1990	Bullseye!	Health Club Receptionist and Girl with John Cleese	
1991	Deadly Game	Lucy	Television film
1991	Some Other Spring	Helen	Television film
1992	Incident at Victoria Falls	Lillie Langtry	Television film
1992	Miss Beatty's Children	Jane Beatty	
1999	Don't Go Breaking My Heart	Suzanne	
2001	Zoe	Cecilia	
2012	Run for Your Wife	Taxi passenger	
2012	Pranks	Joyce	Short film
2017	Another Mother's Son	Louisa Gould	
2021	Off the Rails	Kate	Completed
2024	Hamlet	Gertrude	

=== Television ===
Year	Title	Role	Notes
1982	The Woman in White	Laura Fairlie	Mini-series
1982	Crown Court	Margaret Anderson	Television series; 1 episode
1982	The Brack Report	Angela Brack	Television series; 10 episodes
1983	Diana	Diana Gayelorde-Sutton	Mini-series
1984	Hammer House of Mystery and Suspense	Sara Helston	Television series; 1 episode
1985	A Woman of Substance	Young Emma Hart	Mini-series
1985	The Hitchhiker	Meg	Television series; 1 episode
1985	Hold the Dream	Paula Fairley	Mini-series
1987	Sherlock Holmes	Miss Mary Morstan	Episode: "The Sign of Four"
1989	The Betrothed	The Noble Lady in Monza	Mini-series
2000	Casualty	Summer	Television series; Episode: "Sympathy for the Devil"
2001	Peak Practice	Sister Frances	Television series; Episode: "Prisoners of the Past"
2001–07	Judge John Deed	Jo Mills	Television series; 29 episodes
2009	Lewis	Cecile Rattenbury	Television series; Episode: "The Point of Vanishing"
2010	Identity	Miriam Brolin	Television series; 1 episode
2013	Endeavour	Nora Broom	Television series; Episode: "Rocket"
2015	X Company		Television series; 1 episode
