= Roanne Bardsley =

Welsh television screenwriter

- Occupation: Screenwriter
- Known for: A Woman of Substance; Hollyoaks; The Rising; Screw; Boiling Point; Everything Now; The Buccaneers

Roanne Bardsley is a British television screenwriter, best known her work on the long-running Channel 4 soap opera Hollyoaks. She was originally from Lampeter, later moving to Liverpool.

== Career ==
Following an apprenticeship, Bardsley became a storyliner for Hollyoaks, in 2012. Bardsley graduated to writing over 60 episodes on the series, starting in 2015. In 2018, she won Best Single Episode at the British Soap Awards. Later, she won the writer’s award for Best Long Running TV Series for Hollyoaks at the Writers’ Guild Awards 2020. Bardsley was also selected as one of the Edinburgh TV Festival's 'Ones To Watch'.

She went on to write for Emmy-winning Netflix's children's drama Free Rein, the supernatural thriller series The Rising for Sky Max, and prison drama Screw. Bardsley would join the writing team of The Buccaneers, based on the unfinished novel of the same name by American novelist Edith Wharton, and acted as associate producer on the television adaptation of Boiling Point. Bardsley served as an associate producer and writer on the Netflix series Everything Now.

Alongside Katherine Jakeways, Bardsley is the writer and co-executive producer of Channel 4 period drama A Woman of Substance.
