= Strand Cinema =

Cinema in Belfast, Northern Ireland

Coordinates: 54.601°N 5.880°W

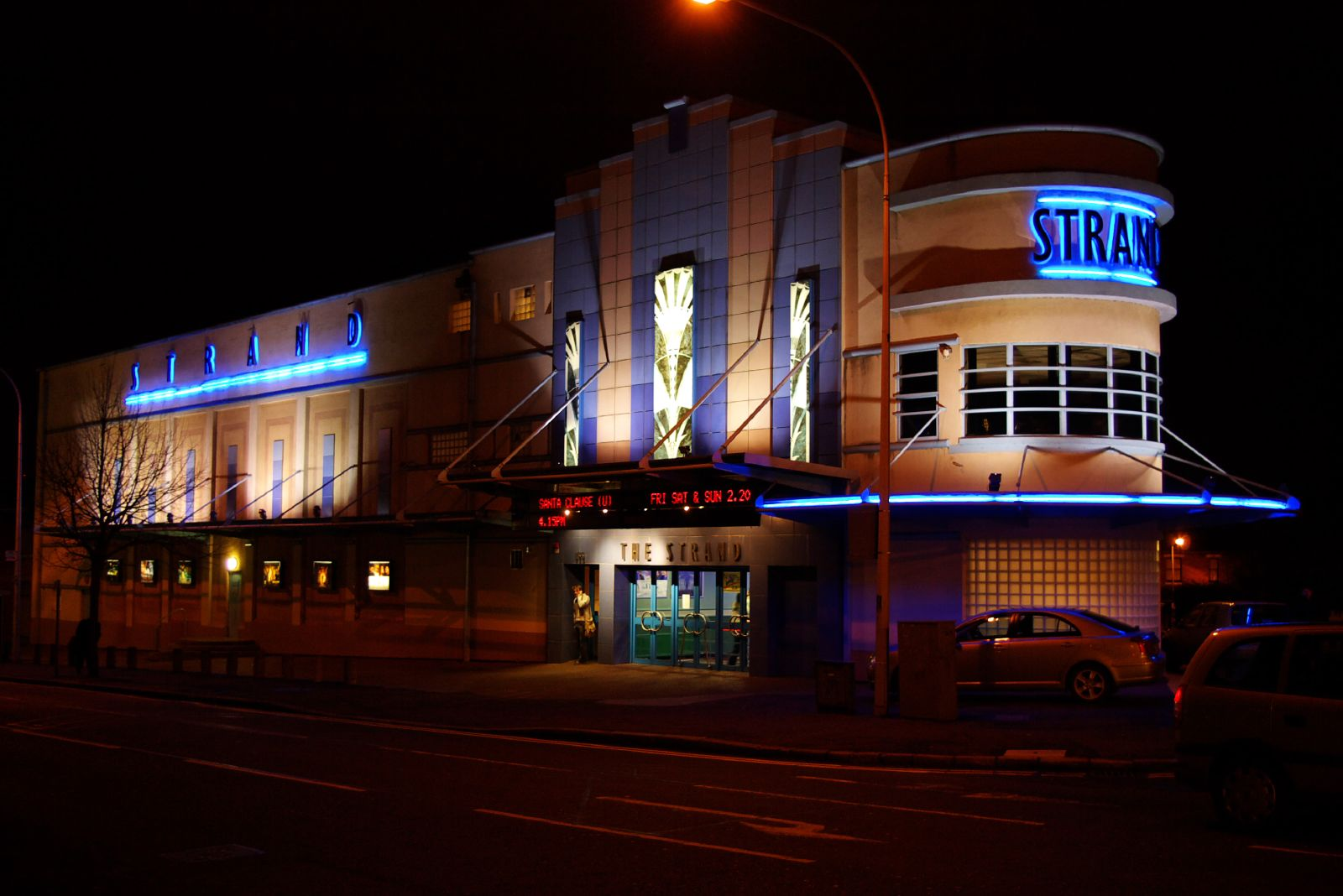
The Strand Arts Centre

The Strand Arts Centre, also known as Strand Cinema, is an independent four-screen cinema in Strandtown on Holywood Road in Belfast, Northern Ireland. It is one of the two remaining independent cinemas in Belfast, alongside the Queen's Film Theatre. It is the only operational picture house in Northern Ireland down from a total of 40 during the genre's peak popularity.

== History ==
The Strand originally built for an English Unions Cinema chain, and consisted of a single screen. The cinema's streamlined moderne design, it is said, was influenced by its proximity to the nearby shipyard of Harland & Wolff, featuring curved walls and portholed foyer. The first film to be shown in the theatre when it opened in 1935 was Bright Eyes featuring Shirley Temple. From 1984 to 1987, The Strand was re-opened as a live concert venue by local businessman, Ronnie Rutherford. In 1999, the original red brickwork of the building was rendered and painted and Art Deco flourishes added over its entrance. The original steel windows were replaced in aluminum framed windows at that time. Following its remodeling, the Strand won a RIBA Architecture Award. The building is landmark in east Belfast due to its prominent location at a busy junction.

The Strand is one of the venues for the Belfast Film Festival, during which it screens classic films. During the 2005 festival the cinema celebrated its 70th birthday by screening A Night to Remember, the 1958 film about the sinking of RMS Titanic, built by Harland & Wolff.

In 2012, The Strand once again offered live theatre as it did in the past, beginning with The Strand Star search, a talent show to find new acts for its new variety nights. After several years of an uncertain future due to maintenance costs, a restoration and expansion to include a museum was announced in November 2023 with funding provided by a UK lottery for the preservation of historic buildings.

It was featured prominently in the first episode of the 2020 BBC Three comedy My Left Nut.
