= Katherine Jakeways =

British comedian, actor and writer

Katherine Jakeways is a British comedian, actress and writer. She has appeared in numerous television, radio and theatrical productions.

== Career ==
Jakeways' television appearances include Extras, Horrible Histories, Sherlock, Tracey Ullman's Show. Tracey Breaks The News, Episodes, Trying Again, all three series of BBC1's The Armstrong & Miller Show, a 2009 episode of Miranda, and Mid Morning Matters with Alan Partridge. Jakeways is creator and lead writer and executive producer of the 2023 series The Buccaneers, adapted from and inspired by Edith Wharton's final novel.

She is also notable as one of the regular cast in the radio series Deep Trouble and Look Away Now and played Mrs Pepys in BBC Radio 4's long-running Woman's Hour Drama "The Diary of Samuel Pepys". She appeared onstage as Sandy in One Flew Over the Cuckoo's Nest at the Garrick Theatre in 2006, and was the Entire Supporting Cast in Armstrong and Miller's 2010 national tour.

2010 saw the first episode of her debut radio comedy, North by Northamptonshire, broadcast on BBC Radio 4. The second series was broadcast from December 2011, and the third series was broadcast from December 2013. North by Northamptonshire stars Sheila Hancock, Penelope Wilton, Mackenzie Crook, Kevin Eldon, Geoffrey Palmer and Felicity Montagu. Jakeways played several parts in the show, and after the first series was broadcast, Radio Times called her work "acutely observed" and suggested she may be "the new Victoria Wood". The second series of North by Northamptonshire was nominated for a Sony Radio Award.

For BBC Radio 4, Jakeways went on to write three series of All Those Women, starring Lesley Manville, Marcia Warren, Sinead Matthews and Lucy Hutchinson; and one series of Guilt Trip, starring Felicity Montagu and Olivia Nixon. She co-wrote series 1 and 2 of Ability with Lee Ridley.

In 2016, Jakeways' radio play Where This Service Will Terminate debuted on BBC Radio 4. Starring Rosie Cavaliero and Justin Edwards as strangers who sit next to each other on a train from Paddington to Penzance. The play had a positive critical and public response and led to the follow-up plays Where This Service Will Continue (2017), Where This Service Will Connect (2018), Where This Service Will Separate (2019) and Where This Service Will Depart (2020). Miranda Sawyer reviewed the set of plays up to 2019 as "attractive, funny and frustrating in equal measures", with "sublime" writing.

She co-wrote the screenplay for the Channel 4 period drama A Woman of Substance with Roanne Bardsley.
