= Barbara Taylor Bradford =

British novelist (1933–2024)

Barbara Taylor Bradford OBE
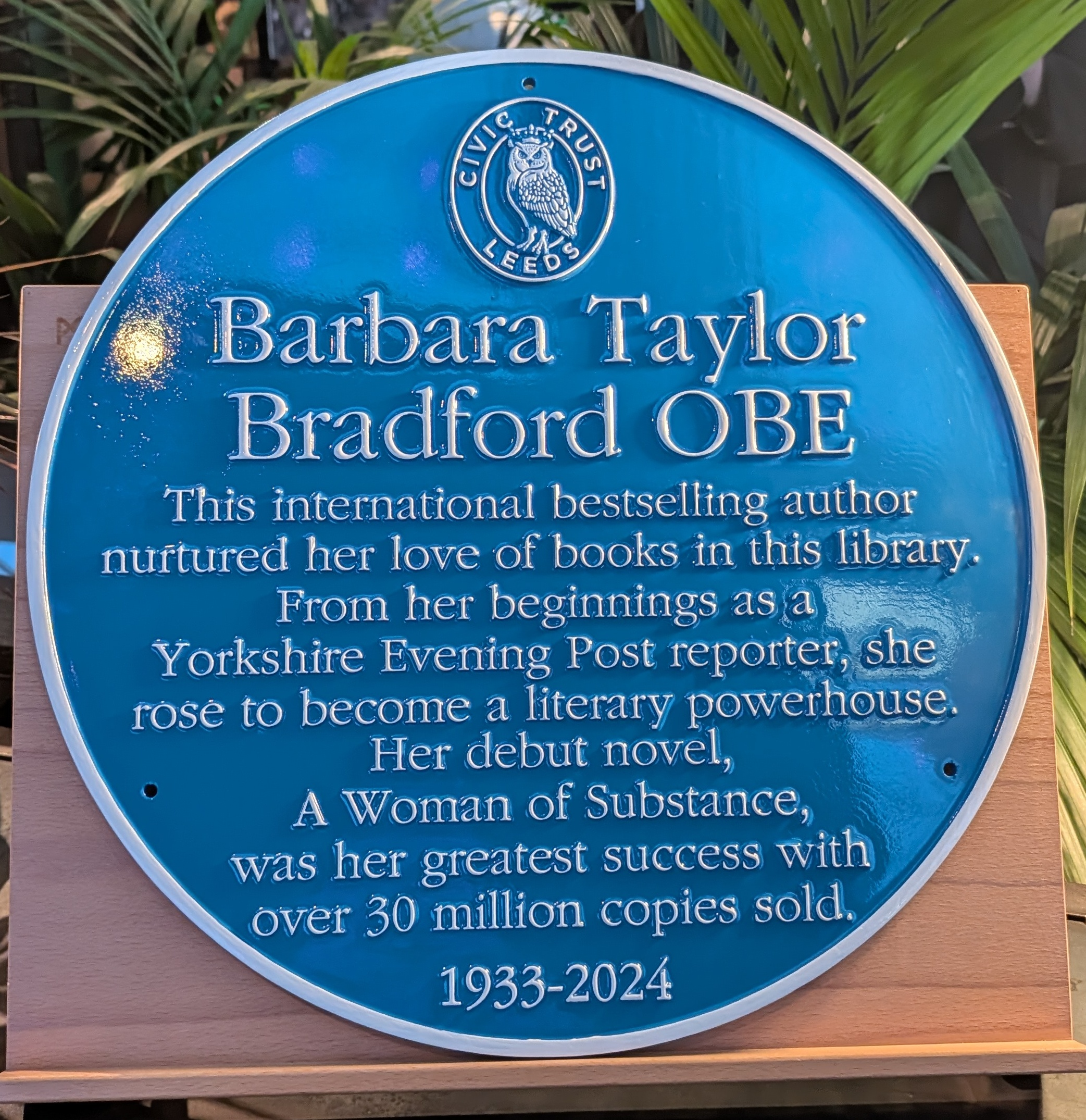
- Born: Barbara Taylor; 10 May 1933; Leeds, England
- Died: 24 November 2024 (aged 91); New York City, US
- Occupation: Novelist
- Years active: 1948–2023
- Spouse: Robert E. Bradford (m. 1963; died 2019)
- Website: www.barbarataylorbradford.com

Barbara Taylor Bradford OBE (10 May 1933 – 24 November 2024) was a British-American best-selling novelist. Her debut novel, A Woman of Substance, was published in 1979 and sold over 30 million copies worldwide. She wrote 40 novels, often about young women of humble beginnings who rise through their hard work in business. Her books were translated into 40 languages and sold more than 90 million copies; ten of her books were also adapted as television miniseries and television movies. Her commercial success amassed a large fortune and she was awarded several honorary degrees and made an Officer of the Order of the British Empire (OBE) for her literary contributions.

== Early life ==
Barbara Taylor was born on 10 May 1933 in Armley, Leeds, to Freda and Winston Taylor. Her father was an engineer who had lost a leg while serving in the First World War. She attended Christ Church Upper Armley Church of England Primary School in the Leeds suburb of Upper Armley alongside the writer Alan Bennett. As a child during the Second World War, she held a jumble sale at her school and donated the £2 proceeds to the "Aid to Russia" fund. She later received a handwritten thank-you letter from Clementine Churchill, the wife of Prime Minister Winston Churchill. Taylor left school aged 16.

Her older brother Vivian died of meningitis before she was born. She later described her mother as having "put all her frustrated love into me". Her parents' marriage is fictionalised in her 1986 novel Act of Will.

In her youth, Barbara Taylor read Charles Dickens, the Brontë sisters, Thomas Hardy, and Colette. At the age of ten she decided to be a writer after sending a story to a magazine. She was paid 7s 6d for the story, with which she bought handkerchiefs and a green vase for her parents.

Her biographer, Piers Dudgeon, later uncovered evidence that her mother Freda Walker was the illegitimate daughter of Oliver Robinson, 2nd Marquess of Ripon, a local Yorkshire landowner who employed the author's grandmother, Edith Walker, as a servant. Dudgeon informed Taylor Bradford that her grandmother and Ripon had had three children together. After some hesitation, Taylor Bradford allowed Dudgeon to publish this information in his biography. Although initially angry at Dudgeon's discovery, she later said that "I came round. There's no stigma now." Her grandmother later spent time in workhouses, which Taylor Bradford explored in the ITV television series Secrets of the Workhouse (2013).

== Career ==
After working briefly in the newspaper's typing pool, Taylor became a reporter for the Yorkshire Evening Post. While there, she worked alongside Keith Waterhouse. At the age of 20, Taylor moved to London, where she later became the fashion editor of Woman's Own magazine and a columnist for the London Evening News. She went on to write an interior decoration column syndicated to 183 newspapers.

Her first fiction writing efforts were four suspense novels, a genre she later abandoned. Bradford would subsequently describe "interviewing herself", saying that "I was in my late thirties. I thought: what if I get to 55, and I've never written a novel? I'm going to hate myself. I'm going to be one of those bitter, unfulfilled writers." Her debut novel, A Woman of Substance (1979), became an enduring best-seller and, according to Reuters, ranks as one of the top-ten best-selling novels of all time. Bradford considered Irish historian and author Cornelius Ryan her literary mentor. Ryan encouraged her writing and was the first person (other than her mother) to whom she had confided her literary ambitions. Her favourite contemporary authors were P. D. James, Bernard Cornwell, and Ruth Rendell.

Bradford wrote 40 novels; the last one, The Wonder of It All, was published in 2023. Her books were translated into 40 different languages and sold more than 90 million copies. In a 1979 interview with the New York Times, Bradford reflected on her career and anticipated legacy: "I'm not going to go down in history as a great literary figure. I'm a commercial writer—a storyteller. I suppose I will always write about strong women. I don't mean hard women, though. I mean women of substance." A common pattern in her novels was a young woman of humble background rising in business through years of hard work, often involving enormous self-sacrifice. She was quoted as saying: "I write about mostly ordinary women who go on to achieve the extraordinary."

=== Adaptations ===
Ten of Bradford's books were made into television mini-series and television movies, produced by her husband Robert E. Bradford. These include A Woman of Substance (1985), Hold the Dream (1986), Act of Will (1989) and To Be the Best (1991). A second adaptation of A Woman of Substance began in 2026.

== Recognition ==
Bradford received honorary degrees from the University of Leeds, the University of Bradford, Mount Saint Mary College, Sienna College, and Post University. She was made an Officer of the Order of the British Empire (OBE) by Queen Elizabeth II as part of the 2007 Birthday Honours for her contributions to literature. Her original manuscripts are archived at the Brotherton Library at the University of Leeds beside those of the Brontë sisters. In 1990 she was the subject of This Is Your Life where she was surprised by Michael Aspel at Heathrow Airport. In 2017, Taylor Bradford was recognised as one of ninety "Great Britons" to commemorate the Queen's 90th birthday. Her name is one of those featured on the sculpture Ribbons, unveiled in 2024.

== Personal life ==
Taylor met her husband, American film producer Robert E. Bradford (born on 25 May 1925 in Berlin, Germany) on a blind date in 1961 after being introduced by the English screenwriter Jack Davies. They married 24 December 1963 and moved permanently to the United States.

Bradford's wealth was estimated at between £60–166 million. There were rumours that she owned 2,000 pairs of shoes and that her former Connecticut home's lake was heated for the benefit of her swans. She addressed the rumours in a 2011 interview, tracing the shoes rumour to a joke and the heated lake to the previous owners of the house who had installed it on part of the lake to provide an ice-free area for a pair of swans in winter.

Robert Bradford died 2 July 2019 in New York City. Barbara Taylor Bradford lived in Manhattan, New York City, and became an American citizen in 1992. On 24 November 2024, she died at home from cancer at the age of 91.

== Selected works ==
=== Fiction ===
==== The Emma Harte Saga ====
- A Woman of Substance (1979)
- Hold the Dream (1985)
- To Be the Best (1988)
- Emma's Secret (2003)
- Unexpected Blessings (2005)
- Just Rewards (2005)
- Breaking the Rules (2009)
- A Man of Honour (2021)

==== The Ravenscar Trilogy ====
- The Ravenscar Dynasty (2006)
- Heirs of Ravenscar (2007) (published as The Heir in the U.S.)
- Being Elizabeth (2008)

==== The Cavendon Chronicles ====
- Cavendon Hall (2014)
- The Cavendon Women (2015)
- The Cavendon Luck (2016)
- Secrets of Cavendon (2017)

==== The House of Falconer ====
- Master of His Fate (2018)
- In the Lion's Den (2020)
- The Wonder of It All (2023)

==== Other fiction ====
- Act of Will (1986)
- The Women in His Life (1990)
- Remember (1991)
- Angel (1993)
- Voice of the Heart (1983)
- Everything to Gain (1994)
- Dangerous to Know (1995)
- Love in Another Town (1995)
- Her Own Rules (1996)
- A Secret Affair (1996)
- Power of a Woman (1997)
- A Sudden Change of Heart (1999)
- Where You Belong (2000)
- The Triumph of Katie Byrne (2001)
- Three Weeks in Paris (2002)
- Playing the Game (2010)
- Letter from a Stranger (2011)
- Secrets from the Past (2013)
- Hidden (2013)
- Treacherous (2014)
- Damaged (2018)

=== Non-fiction ===
- A Garland of Children's Verse (1960)
- The Dictionary of 1001 Famous People: Outstanding Personages in the World of Science, the Arts, Music and Literature (with Samuel Nisenson, 1966)
- Etiquette to Please Him (How to be the Perfect Wife series) (1969)
- Bradford's Living Romantically Every Day (2002)

==== Interior design ====
- The Complete Encyclopedia of Homemaking Ideas (1968)
- Easy Steps to Successful Decorating (Illustrated) (1971)
- How to Solve Your Decorating Problems (1976)
- Making Space Grow (1979)
- Luxury Designs for Apartment Living (1983)

==== Christian books ====
- Children's Stories of Jesus from the New Testament (1966)
- Children's Stories of the Bible from the Old Testament (1966)
- Children's Stories of the Bible from the Old and New Testaments (1968)
