= Jessica Reynolds =

Irish actress (born 1998)

- Reynolds at the 2026 Ostend Film Festival
- Born: 25 March 1998 (age 28)
- Education: Liverpool Institute for Performing Arts
- Occupation: Actress
- Years active: 2019–present
- Family: Ben Reynolds (brother)

Jessica Reynolds (born 25 March 1998) is an Irish actress. On television she is known for her roles in the BBC Three series My Left Nut (2020), the Starz series Outlander (2022–2023) and the Channel 4 series A Woman of Substance (2026). Her films include The Curse of Audrey Earnshaw (2020), Kneecap (2024) and LifeHack (2026).

== Early life ==
Reynolds was born to a Protestant father and an English Catholic mother from Exeter and grew up in Seahill, County Down. Her brother Ben is a hurdler. Reynolds attended Rockport School, where her parents worked as teachers, and then Sullivan Upper School. She graduated from the Liverpool Institute for Performing Arts (LIPA) in 2019.

== Career ==
In 2019, Reynolds was cast as Audrey Earnshaw in the 2020 Canadian film The Curse of Audrey Earnshaw. Filming took place in Canada, resulting in the postponement of her graduation from the Liverpool Institute for Performing Arts. Reynolds said the film is "about a woman in society just trying to find her place the best she can in that moment."

In 2020, Reynolds starred as Rachael in the comedy series My Left Nut, which aired on BBC Three. The series was well-received by critics, with The Guardian calling it "equal parts charmingly funny and strangely sincere".

In March 2021, Reynolds was cast as Malva Christie in the sixth season of Outlander, alongside Mark Lewis Jones and Alexander Vlahos as Tom and Allan Christie, respectively. Reynolds said that Malva was "at the end of the day just a scared little girl who's been brought up by men and not been able to find her place."

On the stage, Reynolds has portrayed Beatrice in Much Ado About Nothing, Rachel in Second Person Narrative and Alais in The Lion in Winter.

In 2024, Reynolds appeared in the Irish comedy-drama Kneecap. In 2026, she played the younger Emma Harte in a Channel 4 reboot of Barbara Taylor Bradford's novel A Woman of Substance. That year, she could also be seen in the 1980s-set film Ancestors.

== Personal life ==
Reynolds lives near Belfast.

== Filmography ==
=== Film ===
Year	Title	Role	Notes
2020	The Curse of Audrey Earnshaw	Audrey Earnshaw	aka: Blood Harvest
2024	Kneecap	Georgia	
2025	LifeHack	Lindsey Heard	
2025	The Wolf, the Fox and the Leopard	Wolf, One, Alice	
2025	Nostalgie	Delphine	Short film
2025	Underscore	Laoise	
2026	Ancestors	Shell	Premiered at the Toronto International Film Festival
TBA	Maya Butterfly †		Filming

=== Television ===
Year	Title	Role	Notes
2020	My Left Nut	Rachael	3 episodes
2022	Derry Girls	Wee Deirdre	Episode: "The Reunion"
2022–2023	Outlander	Malva Christie	8 episodes
2025	House of Guinness	Lady Christine O'Madden	6 episodes
2026	A Woman of Substance	Young Emma Harte	Mini-series; 8 episodes
TBA	Close to Home †	Mairéad	Mini-series; 4 episodes
