= Church of Gay Jesus =

- Shameless episode
- Episode no.: Season 8 Episode 10
- Directed by: Anna Mastro
- Written by: Sheila Callaghan
- Cinematography by: Kevin McKnight
- Editing by: Russell Denove
- Original release date: January 14, 2018
- Running time: 57 minutes

Guest appearances
- Richard Flood as Ford Kellogg (special guest star); Becca Blackwell as Father Murphy; Laura Cerón as Celia Delgado; Alicia Coppola as Sue; Fiona Dourif as Tabitha Youens; Elliot Fletcher as Trevor; Sammi Hanratty as Kassidi; Richard Herd as Gerald; Jessica Szohr as Nessa Chabon; Peter Banifaz as Farhad; Michael Gambino as Rodney; Stacey Oristano as Trina; Billy "Sly" Williams as Linc Donner

Episode chronology
← Previous "The Fugees"	Next → "A Gallagher Pedicure"
- Shameless season 8

"Church of Gay Jesus" is the tenth episode of the eighth season of the American television comedy drama Shameless, an adaptation of the British series of the same name. It is the 94th overall episode of the series and was written by executive producer Sheila Callaghan, and directed by Anna Mastro. It originally aired on Showtime on January 14, 2018.

The series is set on the South Side of Chicago, Illinois, and depicts the poor, dysfunctional family of Frank Gallagher, a neglectful single father of six: Fiona, Phillip, Ian, Debbie, Carl, and Liam. He spends his days drunk, high, or in search of money, while his children need to learn to take care of themselves. In the episode, Fiona runs into a problem with one of the residents at the building, while Ian accepts the "Gay Jesus" mantle.

According to Nielsen Media Research, the episode was seen by an estimated 1.52 million household viewers and gained a 0.55 ratings share among adults aged 18–49. The episode received mostly positive reviews from critics, who considered it as an improvement over previous episodes.

== Plot ==
Fiona (Emmy Rossum) visits Nessa (Jessica Szohr), who reveals that she had a miscarriage. She leaves her to go shopping with Ford (Richard Flood). Frank (William H. Macy) is hopeful that he will finally get to retire, but learns that he does not meet the annual criteria to apply.

Kevin (Steve Howey) and Veronica (Shanola Hampton) help Svetlana (Isidora Goreshter) with her situation by finding a sugar daddy for her. They find an old rich man, but Svetlana punches him when the man makes it clear he only wants sex. Kevin suggests using an earpiece to help her, but Svetlana deviates from their plan. Fiona discovers that Rodney (Michael Gambino), a man who fell off the roof while fixing it, has no home for his family. Trevor (Elliot Fletcher) refers them to a family shelter, but since it will take two days, Fiona allows him to move in with his family to the vacant apartment, she was using, rent-free. However, she is dismayed when Rodney rents the apartment to more people.

Lip (Jeremy Allen White) goes to visit Youens in prison, but is shocked when an officer informs him that Youens died a few days prior. He visits his house and meets his estranged daughter Tabitha (Fiona Dourif), who reveals that Youens died of a seizure due to his alcohol withdrawal. Later, Lip attends the memorial service, but is disheartened to learn he was not the only student to have had a close relationship with Youens; Lip crumples his eulogy and abruptly leaves the ceremony. With Ian (Cameron Monaghan) accepting the "Gay Jesus" mantle for his protests, Frank decides to seize the opportunity to sell merchandising. While Ian initially refuses, he agrees to let Frank do it if donates 95% of the profits to the youth center. Kassidi (Sammi Hanratty) wants Carl (Ethan Cutkosky) to marry her as soon as possible, refusing to let him go to military school before they are officiated.

Debbie (Emma Kenney) returns to welding, but discovers that the property is run by non-union crews, and some end up arrested. She finds a more legitimate job, but suffers an accident when a pipe falls on her toe. Lip returns to Youens' home and consoles Tabitha. Kassidi fakes a suicide hanging to pressure Carl into an impromptu wedding; Carl reluctantly agrees to get married. Ian delivers another speech at a church to his followers, which is met with ovation. Fiona arrives home to talk with Veronica, when a man gives her papers. Fiona is shocked by learning that Rodney is suing her for $6 million for the injury.

== Production ==
=== Development ===
The episode was written by executive producer Sheila Callaghan, and directed by Anna Mastro. It was Callaghan's 12th writing credit, and Mastro's first directing credit.

== Reception ==
=== Viewers ===
In its original American broadcast, "Church of Gay Jesus" was seen by an estimated 1.52 million household viewers with a 0.55 in the 18–49 demographics. This means that 0.55 percent of all households with televisions watched the episode. This was a 8% decrease in viewership from the previous episode, which was seen by an estimated 1.65 million household viewers with a 0.65 in the 18–49 demographics.

=== Critical reviews ===
"Church of Gay Jesus" received mostly positive reviews. Myles McNutt of The A.V. Club gave the episode a "B" grade and wrote, "while the plot has certainly thickened, neither of those stories sound particularly exciting to me, and it's still frustrating to see a character like Frank just tagging onto Ian's story instead of doing something significant like earlier in the season. It still feels like a lot of what the show set up earlier in the season — Liam's trouble at school, for example — has dissipated, creating an absence of momentum even if this week registers as an improvement over the past few outings."

Derek Lawrence of Entertainment Weekly wrote "Over its eight seasons, Shameless — aside from William H. Macy and Joan Cusack — has been largely ignored by awards voters. Most of the outrage in the early years was in regards to the annual outrageous tradition of snubbing Emmy Rossum. And while she's still the anchor and helps carry the series, Jeremy Allen White has slowly become an absolute force and is more than deserving of being the next great Shameless actor the Emmys and Golden Globes completely ignore."

David Crow of Den of Geek gave the episode a 4.5 star rating out of 5 and wrote "All of these threads were woven seamlessly tonight, and came off for a funny, heartbreaking, and most of all purely entertaining episode of Shameless. Put more of the Gallaghers together to join forces in the next two episodes, and we might have a finale worth taking to the county clerk office." Paul Dailly of TV Fanatic gave the episode a 4.5 star rating out of 5, and wrote, ""Church of Gay Jesus" was an excellent installment of this Showtime drama series. It successfully set the wheels in motion for a thrilling conclusion to the season."
