= The Fugees (Shameless) =

- Shameless episode
- Episode no.: Season 8 Episode 9
- Directed by: Jeffrey Reiner
- Written by: Dominique Morisseau
- Cinematography by: Kevin McKnight
- Editing by: Michael S. Stern
- Original release date: January 7, 2018
- Running time: 57 minutes

Guest appearances
- Richard Flood as Ford Kellogg (special guest star); Elliot Fletcher as Trevor; Sammi Hanratty as Kassidi; Cleo King as Registrar; Anil Kumar as Rami; Ruby Modine as Sierra Morton; Jessica Szohr as Nessa Chabon; Jim Hoffmaster as Kermit; Michael Patrick McGill as Tommy; Chet Hanks as Charlie; Tina Ivlev as Freelania Alexeyevich; Ray Laska as Reverend Yates; Levy Tran as Eddie; Billy "Sly" Williams as Linc Donner

Episode chronology
← Previous "Frank's Northern Southern Express"	Next → "Church of Gay Jesus"
- Shameless season 8

"The Fugees" is the ninth episode of the eighth season of the American television comedy drama Shameless, an adaptation of the British series of the same name. It is the 93rd overall episode of the series and was written by co-producer Dominique Morisseau, and directed by Jeffrey Reiner. It originally aired on Showtime on January 7, 2018.

The series is set on the South Side of Chicago, Illinois, and depicts the poor, dysfunctional family of Frank Gallagher, a neglectful single father of six: Fiona, Phillip, Ian, Debbie, Carl, and Liam. He spends his days drunk, high, or in search of money, while his children need to learn to take care of themselves. In the episode, Frank is arrested by Mounties while running his business, while Ian discovers that his tirade against the priest went viral on the Internet.

According to Nielsen Media Research, the episode was seen by an estimated 1.65 million household viewers and gained a 0.65 ratings share among adults aged 18–49. The episode received mixed reviews, with many expressing criticism for the characters' different subplots and lack of scenes together.

== Plot ==
While transporting people to Canada, Frank (William H. Macy) and his group are caught by a group of Mounties. They try to flee, but end up arrested. While taking them to jail, the car crashes, knocking the Mounties unconscious. Frank and the others flee, with the former returning to Chicago.

Ian (Cameron Monaghan) and Trevor (Elliot Fletcher) discover that Ian's tirade against the homophobic priest went viral, and many other churches have joined to support Ian's message. Ian decides to become a motivational speaker at the youth center, which fixes his relationship with Trevor. Kevin (Steve Howey) continues implementing his dominance, demanding that Svetlana (Isidora Goreshter) wear a uniform and respect him and Veronica (Shanola Hampton). They also scold her for never revealing what she checks on her computer, so Svetlana finally lashes out at them; she reveals that she is looking at one of her employees, who married a rich man and is enjoying a wonderful life. Svetlana angrily scolds them for her treatment before walking out.

Kassidi (Sammi Hanratty) has moved in with the Gallaghers, as her relationship with Carl (Ethan Cutkosky) grows. While Carl wants to go back to military school, Kassidi does not want him to leave her. Needing money for her welding classes, Debbie (Emma Kenney) uses a drug dog to steal drugs from the cars of local dealers. Ford (Richard Flood) invites Fiona (Emmy Rossum) to go bowling with him and his friends. While Fiona is content in finally catching his attention, she fails to fit in with his friends. She is forced to leave due to a problem in the tenement building, and Ford accompanies her after seeing that she is caring. Afterwards, they share a kiss.

Sierra (Ruby Modine) learns that Charlie (Chet Hanks) had another woman pregnant and abandons him. Charlie visits Lip (Jeremy Allen White) at the shop, asking him for help. Lip visits Sierra at her house to convince her about forgiving Charlie, but they end up having sex instead. Ian takes a few of his supporters to protest outside a homophobic church. As the priest reprimands him, he suffers a heart attack. Ian revives him by performing CPR, and the video also goes viral. Carl gets a pimp's ring and gives it to Kassidi, to show he will still love her. However, Kassidi mistakes it as an engagement ring, and accepts Carl's "proposal."

== Production ==
=== Development ===
The episode was written by co-producer Dominique Morisseau, and directed by Jeffrey Reiner. It was Morisseau's fifth writing credit, and Reiner's first directing credit.

== Reception ==
=== Viewers ===
In its original American broadcast, "The Fugees" was seen by an estimated 1.65 million household viewers with a 0.65 in the 18–49 demographics. This means that 0.65 percent of all households with televisions watched the episode. This was a massive 103% increase in viewership from the previous episode, which was seen by an estimated 0.81 million household viewers with a 0.23 in the 18–49 demographics.

=== Critical reviews ===
"The Fugees" received mixed reviews. Myles McNutt of The A.V. Club gave the episode a "C+" grade and wrote, "The best moments in “The Fugees” are when the family gets together: the breakfast conversation before the day begins, Fiona and Lip running life choices by each other at the diner, Vee laying down the law on Carl at the Alibi. But at this point, these moments are few and far between in Shameless' eighth season, which is making me impatient for when the show and its characters are going to come back together to say something meaningful, instead of drifting along in stories that even a binge viewer might find too meandering."

Derek Lawrence of Entertainment Weekly wrote "Through eight seasons, Frank Gallagher has done too many horrid and deplorable things for me to even list. And somehow, he might have topped them all in “The Fugees” by punching a little girl straight in the face, knocking her out. What was my reaction? I died of laughter. Does that make me a bad person? No, it makes me a Shameless fan."

David Crow of Den of Geek gave the episode a 4 star rating out of 5 and wrote "This is the very definition of crass, demented, and mean-spirited humor that has made Shameless such a strange and alluring blend over the years. The show can have moments as heartfelt as Ian Gallagher's musings on Jesus Christ, and as silly as Carl accidentally proposing marriage... and then just this kind of gonzo entertainment involving Frank. It might be shameless (clearly), but it also in its best moments is something approaching greatness." Paul Dailly of TV Fanatic gave the episode a 3.5 star rating out of 5, and wrote, ""The Fugees" was the best and worst of Shameless. Some scenes were predictable, while some others were some of the show's funniest to date."
