= A Gallagher Pedicure =

- Shameless episode
- Episode no.: Season 8 Episode 11
- Directed by: Iain B. MacDonald
- Written by: Mark Steilen
- Cinematography by: Kevin McKnight
- Editing by: Michael S. Stern
- Original release date: January 21, 2018
- Running time: 53 minutes

Guest appearances
- Richard Flood as Ford Kellogg (special guest star); Becca Blackwell as Father Murphy; Sammi Hanratty as Kassidi; Ruby Modine as Sierra Morton; Jessica Szohr as Nessa Chabon; Andy Umberger as Blake's Father; Maggie Wheeler as Fiona's Lawyer; Jim Hoffmaster as Kermit; Michael Patrick McGill as Tommy; Karishma Ahluwalia as Dr. Patel; Christian Isaiah as Liam Gallagher; Tina Ivlev as Freelania Alexeyevich; Laird Macintosh as Andrew; Perry Mattfeld as Mel; Jeryl Prescott as Gabarieo; Billy "Sly" Williams as Linc Donner

Episode chronology
← Previous "Church of Gay Jesus"	Next → "Sleepwalking"
- Shameless season 8

"A Gallagher Pedicure" is the eleventh episode of the eighth season of the American television comedy drama Shameless, an adaptation of the British series of the same name. It is the 95th overall episode of the series and was written by co-executive producer Mark Steilen, and directed by supervising producer Iain B. MacDonald. It originally aired on Showtime on January 21, 2018.

The series is set on the South Side of Chicago, Illinois, and depicts the poor, dysfunctional family of Frank Gallagher, a neglectful single father of six: Fiona, Phillip, Ian, Debbie, Carl, and Liam. He spends his days drunk, high, or in search of money, while his children need to learn to take care of themselves. In the episode, Fiona fights the lawsuit that the residents are using against her, while Ian seeks to protect a kid from his parents.

According to Nielsen Media Research, the episode was seen by an estimated 1.52 million household viewers and gained a 0.55 ratings share among adults aged 18–49. The episode received mixed reviews from critics, with Ian's subplot receiving mixed reactions.

== Plot ==
In the middle of the night, Lip (Jeremy Allen White) is awakened when Sierra (Ruby Modine) arrives with Lucas outside his house; her father has been released from prison and she is avoiding him at all costs. He allows her and his child in staying at the house for a few days. She later reveals that she and Neil witnessed their father kill their mother and then testified against him, which is why they want to avoid him, as they fear repercussions.

At the hospital, Debbie (Emma Kenney) is told that her injury was so severe that the doctors are considering a reconstruction or removing the three damaged toes. However, the costs are expensive, and Debbie is forced to leave without any of the procedures. Ian (Cameron Monaghan) is approached by Blake (Jack Essner), a teenager who claims his father (Andy Umberger) is trying to harm him for being gay. Blake's father kidnaps him and prepares to leave on a van, until Ian and his followers surround the vehicle, forcing the father to let Blake go. The father tells Ian that his problem is not with Blake's sexuality, but with his erratic drug abuse and possible prostitution. Ian talks with Blake and decides to stand by him, raising concerns.

Fiona (Emmy Rossum) tries to negotiate with Rodney's family, but discovers that they changed the locks and kept Rusty with them. She consults with the insurance company over the possible lawsuit, but receives bad news; while she is covered $500,000, it is still below the desired $6 million settlement. On top of that, Fiona's contractor has no insurance, which could ruin her chances in winning. After failing to find a sugar daddy, Svetlana (Isidora Goreshter) decides to visit her former employee, Freelania (Tina Ivlev), to learn her secret. Freelania does not help her and mocks her life, just as she prepares to marry her very old boyfriend soon. The old man enters the room and confuses Svetlana for his girlfriend. This motivates Svetlana in kidnapping Freelania, shocking Kevin (Steve Howey) and Veronica (Shanola Hampton). Frank (William H. Macy) is unable to secure his retirement plan, but gets the idea to rob a yacht owned by one of Liam's classmate's father.

To get back at Rodney's family, Fiona and Ford (Richard Flood) blast loud music, cut the water supply and sneak into the apartment through a hole to retrieve Rusty, with Fiona kicking one of the residents in the process. Lip visits Sierra's father and insults him so that he can assault him, which is secretly recorded in camera. He then reports it to the police, and he is sent back to prison, but does not tell Sierra about his actions. To solve her problem, Debbie asks Liam to cut her three toes but both pass out before they can do it. Frank walks in, and calmly cuts the toes and cauterizes the injury. That night, Blake's father arrives again to talk with his son, but Ian uses it as a distraction to burn the van, shocking the father.

== Production ==
The episode was written by co-executive producer Mark Steilen, and directed by supervising producer Iain B. MacDonald. It was Steilen's second writing credit, and MacDonald's seventh directing credit.

== Reception ==
=== Viewers ===
In its original American broadcast, "A Gallagher Pedicure" was seen by an estimated 1.52 million household viewers with a 0.54 in the 18–49 demographics. This means that 0.54 percent of all households with televisions watched the episode. This was even in viewership from the previous episode, which was seen by an estimated 1.52 million household viewers with a 0.55 in the 18–49 demographics.

=== Critical reviews ===
"A Gallagher Pedicure" received mixed reviews from critics. Myles McNutt of The A.V. Club gave the episode a "C" grade and wrote, "I just don't have my bearings with Shameless this season. I don't understand where these stories are headed, I don't understand why many of these stories exist, and I have zero clue how any of this is building to a climax. You will have seen a preview for next week's finale by the time you read this, but I honestly have zero idea what it could include. The idea that there is anything that could save this season of Shameless from itself just seems inconceivable at this moment in time."

Derek Lawrence of Entertainment Weekly wrote "Blake is sent out as bait, luring his dad away from the van, which allows Ian and his assistant to set it on fire. “My god is a f—ot,” Ian screams as the vehicle explodes behind him. “We will not be victims.” Ian is officially the Man on Fire."

David Crow of Den of Geek gave the episode a 4 star rating out of 5 and wrote "When the smoke clears, it could end poorly for each of them. Still, I suspect Fiona will keep her apartment building, even if she winds up living back at the Gallagher House. Because there is no escaping the family. Not that I'm sure we'd want to." Paul Dailly of TV Fanatic gave the episode a 4 star rating out of 5, and wrote, ""A Gallagher Pedicure" was a hilarious hour of this Showtime drama series. There were twists, laughs, and some of the craziest moments of the entire series."
