= Stray Bullet (1998 film) =

Stray Bullet is the name of two 1998 American-Irish action films for Concorde Anois.

== Stray Bullet ==
Stray Bullet
- VHS cover art
- Directed by: Rob Spera
- Written by: Christopher Wood
- Starring: Robert Carradine
- Production company: Concorde Anois
- Distributed by: New Concorde
- Release date: 1998
- Countries: USA; Ireland
- Language: English

=== Cast ===
- Robert Carradine as John Burnside
- Fred Dryer as Forest Mason
- Rebecca Staab as Stella Crosby
- Ian Beattie as Pryke
- Lorraine McCourt as Francesca
- Kieran Hurley as Doyle
- Berts Folan as Kimble
- Ben Gaule as Brown
- Shawn Brewster as Teller
- Mick Nolan as Lilus
- Stuart Dunne as Chester
- Glenn Mulhern as Troy
- Brian Begley as Wayne
- Tim Murphy as Morris

== Stray Bullet II ==
Stray Bullet II
- Directed by: Jeremiah Cullinane
- Written by: Christopher Wood
- Starring: David Carradine
- Production company: Concorde Anois
- Distributed by: New Concorde
- Release date: 1999
- Countries: USA; Ireland
- Language: English

The film did well enough for a sequel, Stray Bullet II.

This was also known as Dangerous Curves.

=== Cast ===
- Robert Carradine as John Burnside
- David Carradine as Lemmy
- Maxine Bahn as Stella Crosby
- Marina Anderson as Elsa Kravitz (credited as Marina Carradine)
- Terry McMahon as Dorf
- Maria Tecce as Ed
- Hillary Kavanagh as Dolly (credited as Hilary Kavanagh)
- Donncha Crowley as Cullen
- Alastair Mac Aindreasa as Blayne
- Padraic Curran as Rand
- Fred McCloskey as Maldini-Jones (credited as Fred McCluskey)
- Éamonn Draper as Lieutenant Dimski (credited as Eamon Draper)
- Emily Hanrahan as Kelly
- Petal Pilley as Mrs. Bentinck
- Ken Bruen as Mr. Bentinck
- Columba Heneghan as Dead Man (uncredited)
