= Directors Guild of America =

Film and television trade union

Coordinates: 34°5′52″N 118°21′45″W

- Predecessor: Radio and Television Directors Guild
- Founded: 1936; 90 years ago
- Headquarters: 7920 Sunset Boulevard; Los Angeles, California
- Location: United States
- Members: 19,673 (2026)
- President: Christopher Nolan
- National Vice President: Laura Belsey
- Key people: Paris Barclay, Secretary-Treasurer; Russell Hollander, National Executive Director
- Website: www.dga.org
- Formerly called: Screen Directors Guild (1936–1960)

The Directors Guild of America (DGA) is an entertainment guild that represents the interests of film and television directors in the United States motion picture industry and abroad. Founded as the Screen Directors Guild in 1936, the group merged with the Radio and Television Directors Guild in 1960 to become the modern Directors Guild of America.

== DGA Awards ==
The DGA hosts the annual DGA Awards, an important precursor to the Academy Awards. In its 69-year history, the DGA Award for Outstanding Directorial Achievement in Feature Film has been a near perfect barometer for both the Best Director, and in some cases, the Best Picture Academy Award. Only seven times has the DGA Award winner not won the corresponding Best Director Academy Award. Honorees are awarded with a statue manufactured by Society Awards.

=== Student Spotlight Awards ===
The inaugural DGA Student Film Awards were held in 1995. As of 2025 the DGA Student Spotlight Awards for Underrepresented Directors are awarded to a number of student filmmakers in an underrepresented group in the industry, such as African American, Asian American, Latino, women, and documentary film makers. Each winner receives a $2,500 cash prize.

== Credits ==
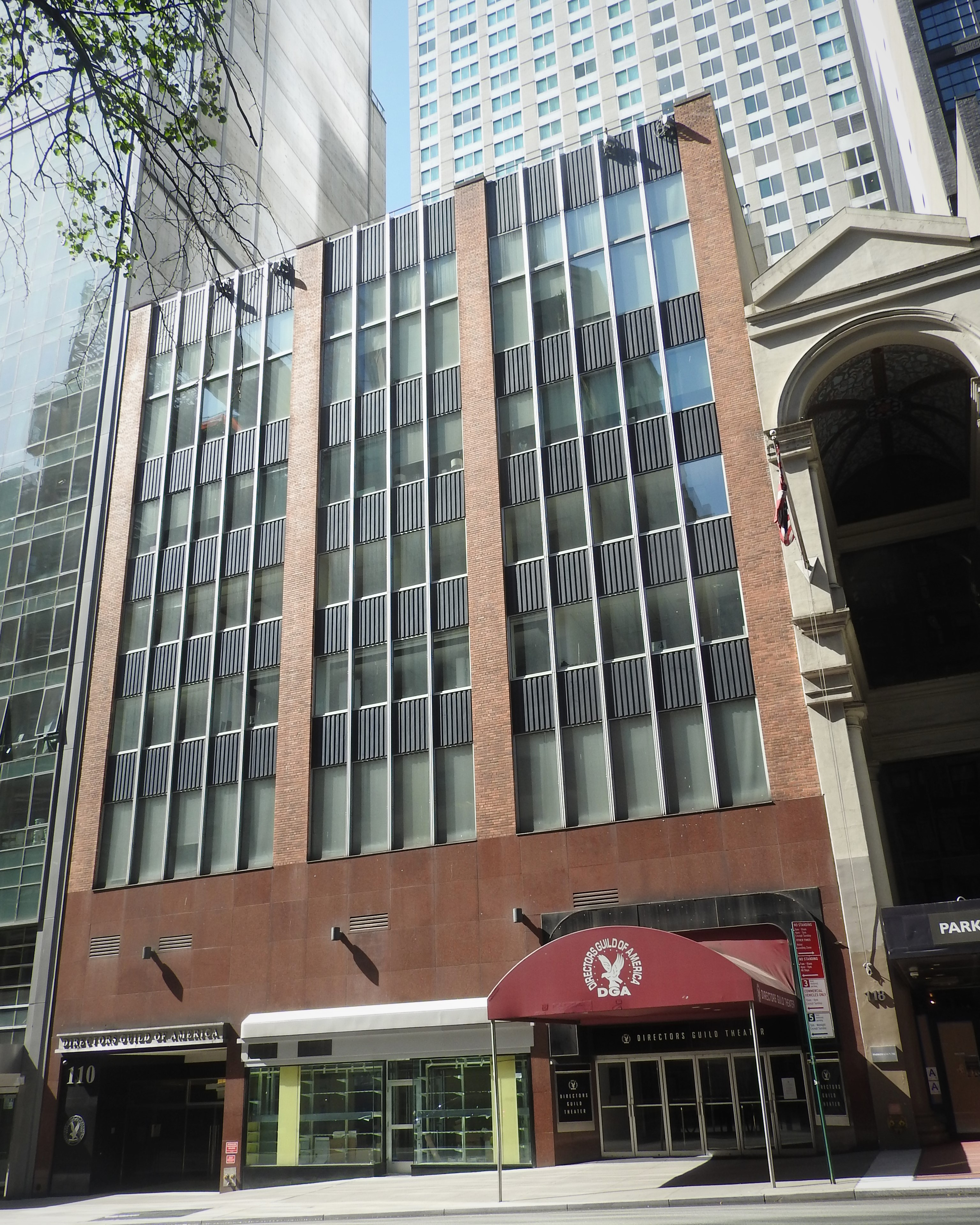
DGA building, Midtown Manhattan

The rule that a film can only have one single director was adopted to preserve the continuity of a director's vision and to avoid producers and actors lobbying for a director's credit, or studios hiring multiple directors for a single film or television episode.

The rule is waived only for directorial teams recognized by the DGA who have a history of working together and sharing a common vision. Examples include The Wachowskis, Jonathan Dayton and Valerie Faris, Hughes brothers, Russo brothers, Phil Lord and Christopher Miller and the Coen brothers. The Coens for years divided credit, with Ethan taking producing credit, Joel taking directing credit, and both of them sharing the writing credit (even though the two of them shared all three duties between themselves) until The Ladykillers in 2004.

An example of the DGA refusing to recognize a directorial team was Robert Rodriguez and Frank Miller for Sin City; they were rejected because they had never worked together before; Rodriguez quit the DGA so that Miller would share director's credit.

For the film Bohemian Rhapsody, director Bryan Singer was fired due to frequent absences and clashing on the set, with Dexter Fletcher replacing him with two weeks left of filming. Singer still received director credit and Fletcher received executive producer credit.

In the past, the DGA has also engaged in disputes with the Writers Guild of America (WGA) over possessory credits, first used in the 1915 film The Birth of a Nation. The WGA tried to limit possessory credits to writers, but has always been successfully opposed by the DGA, leaving directors free to try to negotiate such credits if they wish.

== Non-member directors ==
Not all Hollywood directors are DGA members. Notable exceptions include George Lucas and Robert Rodriguez. Quentin Tarantino directed six feature films before becoming a DGA member, in 2012. Those who are not members of the guild are unable to direct for the larger movie studios, which are signatories to the guild's agreements that all directors must be guild members.

== Leadership ==
Membership (US records)
View source data.

The following are the past Presidents of the Screen Directors Guild and the DGA:

Term	President	Ref.
1936–1938	King Vidor	
1938–1941	Frank Capra	
1941–1943	George Stevens	
1943–1944	Mark Sandrich	
1944–1946	John Cromwell	
1946–1948	George Stevens	
1948–1950	George Marshall	
1950–1951	Joseph L. Mankiewicz	
1951–1959	George Sidney	
1959–1961	Frank Capra	
1961–1967	George Sidney	
1967–1971	Delbert Mann	
1971–1975	Robert Wise	
1975–1979	Robert Aldrich	
1979–1981	George Schaefer	
1981–1983	Jud Taylor	
1983–1987	Gilbert Cates	
1987–1989	Franklin J. Schaffner	
1989–1993	Arthur Hiller	
1993–1997	Gene Reynolds	
1997–2002	Jack Shea	
2002–2003	Martha Coolidge	
2003–2009	Michael Apted	
2009–2013	Taylor Hackford	
2013–2017	Paris Barclay	
2017–2021	Thomas Schlamme	
2021–2025	Lesli Linka Glatter	
2025–present	Christopher Nolan	

== DGA Director's Finder Series ==
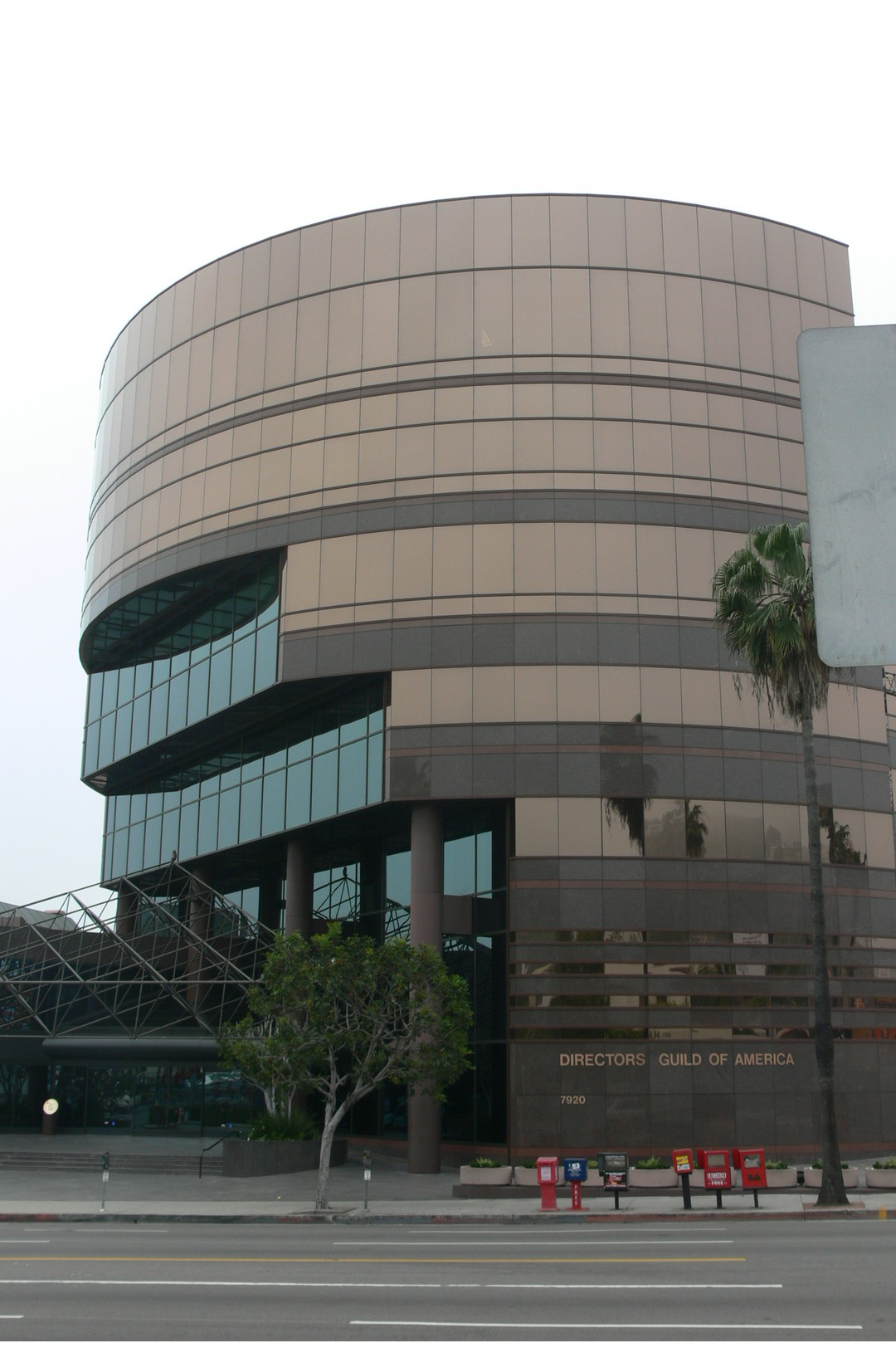
Directors Guild of America building on Sunset Boulevard.

The Director's Finder Series (or Director's Finder Screening Series), inaugurated in December 1998, provides for the screening of independent films with no U.S. distributor, and no previous TV or other distribution. Selected by a lottery, the films are screened in DGA theatres in Los Angeles and New York City to an audience of DGA members and invited potential distributors. Many films have been picked up by distributors via the series that may not otherwise have been spotted. The series was initiated by the DGA's Independent Directors' Committee, chaired by Steven Soderbergh, initially for U.S. films only, but later expanded to include Australian, Irish, British and New Zealand directors, via the International Association of English-Speaking Directors Organisation (IAESDO). By 2007, the series had screened more than 75 films. The DGA has collaborated with organisations such as the Screen Directors Guild of Ireland (SDGI) and the Australian Directors' Guild (ADG), which nominate one film to participate.

Australian entries, selected for the Finders Series Award by the ADG from a shortlist of four, include Boxing Day (2007), directed by Kriv Stenders; and after a five-year lapse, Tony Krawitz's documentary The Tall Man (2012), and in 2014 Catriona McKenzie's Satellite Boy was selected for the series.

Irish entries include Terry McMahon's Patrick's Day (2014) and Ross Whitaker's Katie (2018).

== See also ==
- Alan Smithee
- Runaway production
- Stage Directors and Choreographers Society
