= The Doorway (film) =

2000 film by Michael B. Druxman

- Directed by: Michael B. Druxman
- Written by: Michael B. Druxman
- Produced by: Marta M. Mobley; John Brady executive Roger Corman
- Starring: Roy Scheider; Lauren Woodland
- Cinematography: Yoram Astrakhan
- Edited by: Brian J. Cavanaugh
- Music by: Derek Gleeson
- Production company: Concorde Anois
- Distributed by: New Concorde
- Release date: October 24, 2000
- Countries: United States; Ireland
- Language: English

The Doorway is a 2000 American-Irish supernatural horror film. It was made at Roger Corman's studio Concorde Anois in Ireland.

== Plot ==
Four college students occupying the old Van Buren mansion are menaced by demons who've escaped hell through a concealed doorway in the house. To combat the dark forces, the students solicit help from Professor Lamont (Scheider), an expert on the paranormal. Written and directed by Michael B. Druxman.

== Cast ==
- Roy Scheider as Professor Lamont
- Lauren Woodland as Tammy
- Christian Harmony as Rick
- Suzanne Bridgham as Susan
- Don Maloney as Owen
- Teresa DePriest as Lydia/Evelyn
- Brendan Murray as Abbott
- Ricco Se as Hoskins
- Joe Moylan as Charlie
