= The Suicide Club (2000 film) =

- Directed by: Rachel Samuels
- Based on: The Suicide Club by Robert Louis Stevenson
- Starring: Jonathan Pryce
- Production company: Concorde Anois
- Distributed by: New Concorde
- Release date: 2000
- Countries: United States; Ireland
- Language: English

The Suicide Club — also called The Game of Death — is a 2000 American-Irish film based on the story collection The Suicide Club (1878) by Robert Louis Stevenson. It was directed by Rachel Samuels.

It was from Concorde Anois and was shot in Ireland.

== Cast ==
- Jonathan Pryce ... Bourne
- David Morrissey ... Captain Henry Joyce
- Paul Bettany ... Shaw
- Neil Stuke
- Andrew Powell
- Catherine Siggins ... Sarah
- Terry McMahon

== Production ==
Filming began in April 1999 in Limerick. The budget was reportedly IR£1.6 million. Most of Corman's films of the 1990s went straight to video but he wanted this one released theatrically.

A mansion in Galway was built for the film especially. Corman intended to use this to film a remake of The Hound of the Baskervilles but it was never made.
