= Kate Ashfield =

English actress and screenwriter (born 1972)

- Born: 28 May 1972 (age 54); Oldham, Lancashire, England
- Education: Rose Bruford College
- Occupations: Actress, comedian
- Years active: 1994–present

Kate Ashfield (born 28 May 1972) is an English actress and screenwriter, who has appeared in stage, television, and film roles. She is best known for her role as Liz in the 2004 zombie comedy Shaun of the Dead. Ashfield is the co-writer of the 2017 TV series Born to Kill.

== Early life ==
Ashfield was born in Oldham, Lancashire, England. Her interest in acting started at an early age, and she later pursued her passion by studying drama at Rose Bruford College.

== Career ==
Ashfield's acting profession began in the nineties. She appeared in numerous theatre, TV series and films, including Shaun of the Dead, Secrets & Lies and Sanditon.

In 2004, Ashfield won the Best Actress award at the British Independent Film Awards for her role in the movie Late Night Shopping. She has also received awards for her performances in This Little Life, The Baker and Line of Duty. In addition to her acting on screen, Ashfield has appeared in several stage productions, including Blasted and Shopping and Fucking.

Ashfield appeared in the 2025 Christmas special of Death in Paradise.

== Filmography ==
Key
| † | Denotes productions that have not yet been released |

=== Film ===
| Year | Title | Role | Notes |
|---|---|---|---|
| 1994 | Princess Caraboo | Ella | |
| 1999 | The War Zone | Lucy | |
| 1999 | Guest House Paradiso | Mrs. Hardy | |
| 2000 | Christie Malry's Own Double-Entry | Carol | |
| 2000 | The Low Down | Ruby | |
| 2001 | The Last Minute | Janey | |
| 2001 | Late Night Shopping | Jody | |
| 2001 | Please! | Molly | Short |
| 2001 | Sweetnightgoodheart | Juliet | Short |
| 2001 | Flyfishing | Helen | |
| 2001 | Pure | Helen | |
| 2001 | One Minute | Katie | Short |
| 2003 | Perfect | Rachel | Short |
| 2003 | Collusion | Sally Waterville | |
| 2004 | Spivs | Jenny | |
| 2004 | Fakers | Eve Evans | |
| 2004 | Shaun of the Dead | Liz | |
| 2005 | The Best Man | Becka | |
| 2005 | The Trouble with Men and Women | Susie | |
| 2007 | The Baker | Rhiannon | |
| 2009 | War Schools | Miss Evergreen | Short |
| 2010 | My Brothers | Kitty | |
| 2010 | The Kid | Madeline | |
| 2010 | Behind the Door | Joss | Short |
| 2011 | United | Alma George | |
| 2011 | Late Bloomers | Giulia | It was released in France as Trois fois 20 ans |
| 2011 | 7 Lives | Cynthia | |
| 2012 | Byzantium | Gabi | |
| 2012 | When the Lights Went Out | Jenny | |
| 2013 | Nymphomaniac | Therapist | Vol. II |
| 2013 | Believe | Helen | |
| 2014 | Counting Backwards | | Short |
| 2014 | Still | Margaret | |
| 2015 | Hangman | Beth | |
| 2017 | Seat 25 | Narrator (voice) | |
| 2019 | Suicide Tourist | Fake Mother | |
| 2019 | Rachel | Teresa | Short |
| 2021 | There's Always Hope | Samantha | |
| 2023 | Double Blind | Helen Brady | |
| 2023 | Stockholm Bloodbath | Birgitta | |

=== Television ===
| Year | Title | Role | Notes |
|---|---|---|---|
| 1995 | Fist of Fun | Jill Edmonds | 1 Episode |
| 1995 | Prime Suspect | Helper | 1 episode: "The Scent of Darkness" |
| 1996 | Soldier Soldier | Cate Hobbs | 8 Episodes |
| 1996 | Seed | Julie | TV Movie |
| 1996 | No Bananas | Sylvia | 1 Episode |
| 1998 | A Many Splintered Thing | Elly Jackson | TV Movie |
| 1999 | Watership Down | Primrose (voice) | 7 Episodes |
| 1999 | Love in the 21st Century | Kate | 1 episode |
| 1999 | The Man | Kim | TV Movie |
| 2000 | A Many Splintered Thing | Elly Rawsthorne | 6 Episodes |
| 2000 | Storm Damage | Kay | TV Movie |
| 2001 | Do or Die | Samantha | TV Mini Series, 2 episodes |
| 2002 | Crime and Punishment | Dunya | 2 episodes |
| 2003 | This Little Life | Sadie MacGregor | TV Movie |
| 2003 | Pollyanna | Nancy | TV Movie |
| 2003 | Killing Hitler | Rachel | TV Movie |
| 2005 | Secret Smile | Miranda Cotton | TV Mini Series:2 episodes |
| 2005 | Perfect Day | Jenny | TV Movie |
| 2006 | Tsunami: The Aftermath | Ellen | TV Mini Series:2 episodes |
| 2006 | Random Quest | Ottilie Harsham / Kate Ottilie Gale | TV Movie |
| 2007 | Talk to Me | Kellyteacher | 4 episodes |
| 2008 | The Children | Natasha | TV Mini Series:3 episodes |
| 2008 | 10 Days to War | Veronica Purkiss | TV Mini Series:1 episodes |
| 2008 | Never Better | Anita | 6 episodes |
| 2009 | Collision | Inspector Ann Stallwood | TV Mini Series:4 episodes |
| 2009 | The Diary of Anne Frank | Miep Gies | TV Mini Series:5 episodes |
| 2010 | Poirot | Miss Wills | 1 episode |
| 2011 | Silent Witness | CI Rebecca Woods | 2 episodes |
| 2011 | New Tricks | Hilary Newell | 1 episode |
| 2011 | Mystery! | | 1 episode |
| 2012 | The Kidnap Diaries | Anabel Langan | TV Movie |
| 2012 | Line of Duty | Jools Gates | 5 episodes |
| 2013 | Midsomer Murders | Helen Caxton | 1 episode |
| 2015 | The House Sitter | Sara Lawrence | TV Movie |
| 2015 | Secrets and Lies | Vanessa Richardson/Vanessa Turner | 4 episodes |
| 2017 | Unspeakable | Sally | TV Movie |
| 2018 | Sick of It | Zoe | 1 episode |
| 2019 | A Confession | Yvonne Fulcher | TV Mini Series:5 episodes |
| 2019 | His Dark Materials | Atal (voice) | 4 episodes |
| 2019–2023 | Sanditon | Mary Parker | 20 episodes |
| 2020 | Life | Rachel | TV Mini Series:5 episodes |
| 2023 | The Chat | Pip | TV Mini Series |
| 2023 | Bodies | Elaine Morley | TV Mini Series:1 episode |
| 2024 | Moonflower Murders | Joanne Webster | TV Mini Series:3 episodes |
| 2025 | Lazarus | Detective Alison Brown | TV Mini Series:6 episodes |
| 2025 | Death in Paradise | Helen Dugdale | 1 Episode - Christmas Special |

=== As writer ===
| Year | Title | Creator | Writer | Notes |
|---|---|---|---|---|
| 2017 | Born to Kill | Yes | Yes | Mini-Series |
| 2019 | Man in Room 301 | Yes | Yes | 6 episodes |
| 2021 | Süü | Yes | No | 6 episodes |

== Awards and nominations ==
| Year | Award | Category | Work | Results | Notes | Ref. |
|---|---|---|---|---|---|---|
| 2000 | British Independent Film Awards | Best Actress | The Low Down | Nominated | | |
| 2001 | British Independent Film Awards | Best Actress | Late Night Shopping | Won | | |
| 2001 | Berlin International Film Festival | Shooting Stars Award | —N/a | Won | | |
| 2003 | British Independent Film Awards | Best Actress | This Little Life | Nominated | | |
| 2004 | Royal Television Society | Best Female Actor | This Little Life | Won | | |
| 2005 | Empire Awards | Best British Actress | Shaun of the Dead | Nominated | | |
| 2017 | British Screenwriters’ Awards | Best Crime Writing on Television - Series/Single Drama (Shared with Tracy Malone and Kate Gartside) | Born to Kill | Nominated | | |
| 2018 | BAFTA Cymru Awards | Best Television Drama | Born to Kill | Nominated | | |
