= Sarah Greene (actress) =

Irish actress

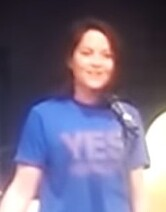
- Greene in 2015
- Born: 24 July 1984 (age 42); Cork, Ireland
- Occupations: Actress, singer
- Years active: 2006–present
- Partner: Nathan Connolly (engaged)
- Children: 1

Sarah Greene (born 24 July 1984) is an Irish actress and singer. She won acclaim for portraying Helen McCormick in the West End and Broadway productions of The Cripple of Inishmaan.

For her performance in the role, she was nominated for the 2014 Laurence Olivier Award for Best Actress in a Supporting Role, and the 2014 Tony Award for Best Featured Actress in a Play. She won an Irish Film and Television Award for Best Actress - Drama, as Hecate Poole in the Showtime and Sky series Penny Dreadful, as well as starring as Maxine in the CBS series Ransom.

== Early life ==
Greene was born in Cork, Ireland.

She became interested in acting when she saw Red Riding Hood along with her parents at the Opera House in Cork. A short time later she joined the CADA Performing Arts in Cork, where she took part in theatre plays and musicals until she was 19 years old. When Greene was six years old she first appeared on stage. She played a twin in the theatre play The King and I at the Opera House in Cork. After leaving CADA Performing Arts she was trained at the Gaiety School of Acting in Dublin, from which she graduated in 2006.

== Career ==
In Greene's first film appearance, in 2008, she played Imelda Egan in Eden. In 2009, she appeared as the barmaid Cathleen in Love and Savagery. In 2010, she starred as Amber in the play Grimm at The Peacock theatre in Dublin. In 2011, she played Sinead Mulligan in the film The Guard.

In 2013 and 2014, she appeared with Daniel Radcliffe in the theatre play The Cripple of Inishmaan. For her performance as Helen McCormick she was nominated for the Tony Award and the Laurence Olivier Award as best actor in a supporting role. In 2014, she appeared in The Assets. In Noble, she played Christina Noble. In 2015, she played Hecate Poole in Penny Dreadful. In 2019, she began to play one of the leads on Dublin Murders, as Detective Cassie Maddox.

== Personal life ==
Greene is engaged to musician Nathan Connolly. They have one son together.

== Acting credits ==
=== Film ===
Year	Title	Role	Ref.
2008	Eden	Imelda Egan	
2009	Love and Savagery	Cathleen	
2010	My Brothers	Rose	
2011	The Guard	Sinead Mulligan	
2014	Noble	Middle Christina	
2014	Standby	Hipster Girl	
2015	Burnt	Kaitlin	
2018	Dublin Oldschool	Lisa	
2018	Black '47	Ellie	
2018	Rosie	Rosie Davis	
2023	In the Land of Saints and Sinners	Sinead	
2025	Father Mother Sister Brother	Jeanette	

=== Television ===
Year	Title	Role	Notes	Ref.
2006	Bachelors Walk	Table Football Girl #1	Christmas special	
2009	Psych Ward	Jenny McArdle	2 episodes	
2010	Raw	Sarah	1 episode	
2014	The Assets	Laura	Episode: "Avenger"	
2015–2016	Penny Dreadful	Hecate Poole	Recurring role	
2016	Rebellion	May Lacey	Miniseries	
2017–2018	Ransom	Maxine Carlson	Main role	
2019	Dublin Murders	Cassie Maddox	Main role	
2020	Normal People	Lorraine Waldron	Recurring role	
2020	Roadkill	Charmian Pepper	Miniseries	
2021	Frank of Ireland	Aine	Miniseries	
2022	Bad Sisters	Bibi Garvey	Main role	
2024	Sexy Beast	Deedee Harrison	Main cast	
2025	The Death of Bunny Munro	Libby	Main cast	

=== Theatre ===
Year	Title	Role	Notes	Ref.
2006	The Empress of India	Kate	Town Hall Theatre, Galway	
2006	The Year of the Hiker	Mary Lacey	The Pavilion Theatre, Dublin	
2007	Danti Dan	Cactus	Wexford Arts Centre, Wexford	
2009	The Playboy of the Western World	Honor Blake	Druid Theatre Company	
2010	Phaedra	Ismene	Project Arts Centre, Dublin	
2010	Little Gem	Amber	Peacock Theatre, Dublin	
2011	Between Foxrock and a Hard Place	Sorcha	Gaiety Theatre, Dublin	
2011	Between Foxrock and a Hard Place	Sorcha	Cork Opera House, Cork	
2012	Alice in Funderland	Alice	Abbey Theatre, Dublin	
2013	The Cripple of Inishmaan	Helen McCormick	Noël Coward Theatre, London	
2014	The Cripple of Inishmaan	Helen McCormick	Cort Theatre, New York	
2017	Woyzeck	Marie	Old Vic, London	
2017	The Ferryman	Caitlin Carney	Gielgud Theatre, London	

=== Video games ===
Year	Title	Role	Notes	Ref.
2013	Assassin's Creed IV: Black Flag	Anne Bonny; Performer: "The Parting Glass"	Voice	
2015	The Witcher 3: Wild Hunt	Cerys an Craite	Voice	
2016	The Bunker	"Margaret"	Live action	
2026	Assassin's Creed Black Flag Resynced	Anne Bonny; Performer: "The Parting Glass"	Voice	

== Awards and nominations ==
Year	Award	Category	Work	Result	Ref.
2014	Laurence Olivier Award	Best Actress in a Supporting Role	The Cripple of Inishmaan	Nominated	
2014	Tony Award	Best Featured Actress in a Play	The Cripple of Inishmaan	Nominated	
2015	Irish Film and Television Awards	Rising Star	—N/a	Won	
2015	Irish Film and Television Awards	Best Actress in a Supporting Role Film	Noble	Won	
2016	Irish Film and Television Awards	Best Actress in a Supporting Role Drama	Penny Dreadful	Won	
2016	Irish Film and Television Awards	Best Actress in a Lead Role Drama	Rebellion	Nominated	
2018	Irish Film Festival London	Ros Hubbard Award for Acting	—N/a	Won	
2018	Dublin Film Critics' Circle Awards	Best Actress	Rosie	Nominated	
2020	Irish Film & Television Awards	Best Actress in a Lead Role Film	Rosie	Nominated	
2020	Irish Film & Television Awards	Best Actress in a Lead Role Drama	Dublin Murders	Nominated	
2020	Women's Image Network Awards	Actress in a Television Movie / Limited Series	Dublin Murders	Nominated	
2021	Irish Film & Television Awards	Best Actress in a Supporting Role Drama	Normal People	Won	
2022	Peabody Award	Entertainment	Bad Sisters	Won	
2023	Irish Film & Television Awards	Supporting Actress – Television Drama	Bad Sisters	Nominated	

== See also ==
- List of Irish actors
