= Patrick's Day (film) =

2014 Irish psychological drama film by Terry McMahon

- Poster
- Directed by: Terry McMahon
- Written by: Terry McMahon
- Produced by: Tim Palmer; Rachel Lysaght
- Starring: Kerry Fox; Moe Dunford; Catherine Walker; Philip Jackson
- Cinematography: Michael Lavelle
- Edited by: Emer Reynolds
- Production companies: Ignition Film Productions; Underground Films; Irish Film Board
- Release dates: 8 March 2014 (SXSW); 6 February 2015 (Ireland)
- Running time: 102 minutes
- Country: Ireland
- Language: English

Patrick's Day is a 2014 Irish psychological drama film written and directed by Terry McMahon. It stars Kerry Fox, Moe Dunford, Catherine Walker, and Philip Jackson. The film is about a grocery stockboy with schizophrenia and an overprotective, domineering mother who clash for the first time when her son discovers love with a suicidal stewardess.

== Plot ==
Patrick is a 26-year-old man, with a diagnosis of schizophrenia, who goes missing in the middle of the St. Patrick's Day festivities in Dublin, much to the alarm of his English mother Maura. Unbeknownst to her, Patrick was riding the ferris wheel, and returned later to the hotel room to discover his mom was not there. He sat outside on the front steps of the lobby smoking a cigarette, and is approached by Karen, a depressed and suicidal flight attendant. She buys Patrick several drinks and after some flirting, she kisses him. Patrick tells her "I'm schizophrenic", to which Karen replies "Aren't we all?"; subsequently, the two have sex and share a connection. Meanwhile, Maura is attempting to persuade the police to search for her son, but the inspector, John Freeman, prefers to impart his comedy routine upon her instead.

Maura eventually returns to the hotel and falls asleep. Patrick sneaks back in to wash-up, but awakes his infuriated mother who demands answers. Upon learning them, she pounds on Karen's door and the two have a verbal spat. Maura eventually returns Patrick to his group home for special needs people and insists that he forget all about her. However, after being bullied and having his hand sprained, Patrick flees the home. A stray dog begins following him after sleeping by him, and the two eventually bond. A café owner, whose son is also schizophrenic, feeds both Patrick and the dog as he telephones Karen to inform him, per Patrick's request.

Karen returns home with both Patrick and the dog, whom she names Clint. She bathes Patrick, and while initially resistant, eventually succumbs to his romantic advances. Maura, still frantically seeking answers, day-drinks with John, who eventually drives her to Karen's place where they witness Patrick being a cogent participant, contradicting Maura's claims to John that Patrick is helpless. After Karen drives Patrick back to the home, she returns home only to be confronted by an irate Maura. Karen reveals that she is pregnant with Patrick's child, and Maura questions why she would risk the possibility of her child having an Intellectual disability. After Karen rebuffs her offer to pay for an abortion, Maura tells her that she will have to "break Patrick's heart" in order to sever any attachment. Whether on her own volition or spurred on by Maura, Karen cruelly dumps Patrick later that evening. A confused and angry Patrick is confronted by his bully shortly thereafter (whom Maura insisted is one of Patrick's delusions). Rather than take the abuse, Patrick lashes out and strikes him, requiring restraint.

Maura then seizes the opportunity to erase Karen from Patrick's memory by removing any trace of connections to her. She manipulates his best friend and roommate, Freddie, into revealing Patrick's secret hiding place and obtaining Karen's business card. She then pretends to believe Patrick, while subtly insinuating that he is merely having another delusion, confusing him further.

== Cast ==
- Moe Dunford as Patrick Fitzgerald
- Kerry Fox as Maura Fitzgerald
- Catherine Walker as Karen Prescott
- Philip Jackson as Insp. John Freeman
- Aaron Monaghan as Freddie
- Terence Orr as Beep-Beep
- Conor Mullen as Dr. Meyer
- Donna Dent as Nurse Stephanie
- David Herlihy as Enda
- Tommy O'Neill as Sam
- Joanne Crawford as Dr. Toure
- Emmett J. Scanlan as hotel concierge

== Release ==
Patrick's Day was premiered at SXSW on 8 March 2014. Throughout 2014 it was shown at many festivals, including Edinburgh and the Galway Film Fleadh. It went on general release in Ireland on 6 February 2015.

== Reception and accolades ==
The Irish Times gave it 4 stars out of 5, calling it "a fascinating collision of psychiatric drama and state-of-the nation address." The Irish Independent, on the other hand, gave it 2 star out of 5 and criticised "McMahon's tendency to write speeches rather than dialogue which people might actually use, something of a drawback when he appears to be going for realism".

Patrick's Day was nominated for nine IFTAs at the 12th Irish Film & Television Awards, and won three: Best Script (Film) for Terry McMahon, Best Actor in a Lead Role in a Feature Film for Moe Dunford, and Best Sound.

It was selected for entry to the Directors Guild of America's Directors Finder Series in 2014.
