= The Gone =

New Zealand television series

- Genre: Crime drama
- Screenplay by: Anna McPartlin; Michael Bennet
- Directed by: Peter Burger; Hannah Quinn; Dathaí Keane
- Starring: Richard Flood; Acushla-Tara Kupe; Carolyn Bracken
- Music by: Mahuia Bridgman-Cooper
- Countries of origin: New Zealand; Ireland
- Original languages: English; Māori
- No. of series: 2
- No. of episodes: 12

Production
- Executive producers: Steve Barr; Laura Beetz; Michael Bennett; David Creen; Yvonne Donohoe; Katie Holly; Dermot Horan; Karl Zohrab; Anna McPartlin
- Producers: Timothy White; Reikura Kahi
- Cinematography: Dave Cameron
- Editors: Darragh Moran; Bryan Shaw
- Production companies: Kōtare Productions; Keeper Pictures; Kingfisher Films

Original release
- Network: TVNZ (New Zealand); RTÉ (Ireland)
- Release: 7 May 2023 – 24 November 2024

The Gone is a crime drama television series directed by Peter Burger and Hannah Quinn, with scripts written by Anna McPartlin and Michael Bennet. The first season of six episodes was broadcast from 7 May 2023 on TVNZ in New Zealand. It stars Richard Flood as Irish detective Theo Richter, who joins Detective Sergeant Diana Huia (Acushla-Tara Kupe) to investigate the disappearance of an Irish couple in New Zealand. Irish journalist Aileen Ryan (Carolyn Bracken) reports on the situation. A second season of six episodes followed in 2024, directed by Dathaí Keane and Peter Burger. When Aileen also goes missing, Theo and Diana lead the search.

== Premise ==
When an Irish couple go missing in Mt Affinity, New Zealand, Irish detective Theo Richter collaborates with local police Diana Huia and Bruce Harris to solve the mystery.

== Cast and characters ==
- Richard Flood as Theo Richter
- Acushla-Tara Kupe as DS Diana Huia
- Carolyn Bracken as Aileen Ryan
- Vanessa Rare as Wiki Huia
- Scott Wills as Sergeant Bruce Harris
- Wayne Hapi as Buster Huia
- Rachel Morgan as Sinead Martin
- Michelle Fairley as Hannah Martin
- Simon Mead as Ronan Garvey
- Manu Bennett as Tamati Davidson
- Bill Murphy as Superintendent Walsh

== Production ==
Directed by Peter Burger and Hannah Quinn, the six-part series is co-produced by Kōtare Productions, Keeper Pictures and Kingfisher Films, in association with Southern Light Films. The series is co-written by Anna McPartlin and Michael Bennet. Filming took place on location in Dublin, Auckland and Te Aroha. The cast is led by Acushla-Tara Kupe, Richard Flood, Manu Bennett, and Carolyn Bracken.

A second series was being filmed in February 2024.

== Broadcast ==
The series was available in New Zealand in May 2023 on TVNZ. It was shown on RTÉ in Ireland in October 2023 and in the UK on BBC4 in March 2024.

== Reception ==
=== Critical reception ===
Lucy Mangan in The Guardian gave the series four stars and praised the characterisations. Liam Fay in The Times praised the New Zealand landscape but felt the show consisted largely of tired television cliches.

=== Accolades ===
The series won five awards at the 2023 New Zealand Television Awards, winning Best Drama, Best Cinematography (Drama/Comedy Drama) for Dave Cameron, Best Original Score for Mahuia Bridgman-Cooper, Best Costume Design for Pauline Pohatu and Best Makeup Design for Kelly Mitchell.
