= Ordinary Decent Criminal =

- DVD case cover for Ordinary Decent Criminal
- Directed by: Thaddeus O'Sullivan
- Written by: Gerard Stembridge
- Produced by: Jonathan Cavendish
- Starring: Kevin Spacey; Linda Fiorentino; Peter Mullan; Stephen Dillane; Helen Baxendale; David Hayman; Patrick Malahide; Colin Farrell; Christoph Waltz; Vincent Regan; Donny Hak; Aiden Duffy
- Cinematography: Andrew Dunn
- Edited by: William M. Anderson
- Music by: Damon Albarn
- Production companies: River Road Entertainment; Tat Film; Little Bird; Trigger Street Productions
- Distributed by: Icon Film Distribution (Ireland/United Kingdom); Buena Vista Home Entertainment (Note: Under Miramax Home Entertainment label) (United States); Icon Entertainment International (International)
- Release dates: 7 January 2000 (Ireland); 17 March 2000 (U.K.); 21 January 2003 (U.S.)
- Running time: 93 minutes
- Countries: Ireland; Germany; United Kingdom; United States
- Language: English
- Budget: $10 million

Ordinary Decent Criminal is a 2000 crime comedy film, directed by Thaddeus O'Sullivan, written by Gerard Stembridge, and stars Kevin Spacey and Linda Fiorentino. The film is loosely based on the story of Martin Cahill, a famous Irish crime boss.

Filmed in late 1998 and originally scheduled for a fall 1999 release, the film premiered in Ireland in December 1999. Icon shipped out the movie overseas the following year, while Miramax Films acquired North American distribution rights, but it never got a proper theatrical release in the US and was released straight to video in January 2003, almost five years after filming began.

== Plot ==
Michael Lynch is one of Dublin's most notorious criminals. He has two wives, sisters Christine and Lisa, as well as many children. When he is not spending time with his family, he is plotting heists with his gang. His actions make him an iconic figure, and he has a rapport with the general public despite being a criminal.

During his elaborate heists, he concentrates on the showmanship as much as the crime itself. He pulls off a daring art theft, stealing several priceless paintings from Dublin's best art gallery, giving the authorities the slip. The Gardaí become more determined to catch him as time goes on, in particular Noel Quigley, an officer whose ambition to catch Lynch becomes an obsession. His actions also gain the ire of the IRA.

Lynch finds himself in trouble when he is unable to sell a stolen Caravaggio painting, The Taking of Christ, giving Quigley the opportunity he was waiting for to try and catch him. Lynch is forced to go on the run, with his popularity with the public at stake.

== Cast ==
- Kevin Spacey as Michael Lynch
- Linda Fiorentino as Christine Lynch
- Peter Mullan as Stevie
- Stephen Dillane as Noel Quigley
- Helen Baxendale as Lisa Lynch
- David Hayman as Tony Brady
- Patrick Malahide as Commissioner Daly
- Gerard McSorley as Harrison
- David Kelly as Father Grogan
- Gary Lydon as Tom Rooney
- Paul Ronan as Billy Lynch
- Colin Farrell as Alec
- Vincent Regan as Shay Kirby
- Tim Loane as Jerome Higgins
- Christoph Waltz as Peter
- Enda Oates as Brian
- Anthony Brophy as Liam
- David Brady as Declan Brady
- Mike Diamente as James Mason
- Jeffrey Connon as Paul O'Keeffe
- Bill Murphy as Detective Barry

== Production ==
Thaddeus O'Sullivan began trying to adapt the book The General by Paul Williams, but abandoned a direct adaption. Having previously worked on Nothing Personal about loyalist paramilitaries, and a biopic about John Gotti for NBC, O'Sullivan did not want to again work under the factual and legal constraints of a film based on real people, and was more interested in making a comedy or caper, and instead they developed their own story only loosely based on Martin Cahill. The original project went back on the market and John Boorman came on board as director. O'Sullivan was worried that investors might think the two projects were too similar, but after Boorman's The General screened at Cannes people saw the films were very different and were willing to invest.

O'Sullivan would have cast more Irish actors except for Boorman's film, and said "If his part had not been so prominent in The General, I would have had Seán McGinley in my film. I'd have him in every film." He felt it was necessary to cast recognizable named stars to stand the best chance of recouping the film's $10 million budget, and was ultimately pleased with what he described as a "dream cast".

Having seen Colin Farrell in a play at London's Donmar Warehouse Theatre, Spacey invited him to appear in one of his films, and convinced director O'Sullivan to cast him.

== Reception ==
The film received negative reviews from critics. On Rotten Tomatoes, the film has an approval rating of 14% based on reviews from 7 critics.

Christopher Null, writing for Filmcritic.com, gave it 1.5 out of 5: "I can only imagine one thing worse than Kevin Spacey trying on an Irish accent, and that's sultry Linda Fiorentino doing the same thing." Though especially critical of the cast's accents, he wrote that the film's biggest problem is "a dull-as-a-Nerf-ball script that makes Ordinary Decent Criminal far less than ordinary".

Derek Elley of Variety called it "an ordinary, decent movie. Neither an embarrassment nor a triumph, tedious nor gripping". Elley praised the cast but compared it unfavorably with John Boorman's 1998 film The General.

== Music ==
=== Soundtrack ===
1. "One Day at a Time" – Damon Albarn and Robert Del Naja
2. "Kevin on a Motorbike" – Damon Albarn
3. "Superfinger" – Lowfinger
4. "Mother of Pearl" – Bryan Ferry
5. "I Want You" – Shack
6. "Gopher Mambo" – Yma Sumac
7. "Chase After Gallery" – Damon Albarn
8. "Eurodisco" – Bis
9. "Bank Job" – Damon Albarn
10. "Dying Isn't Easy" – Damon Albarn

== Home media ==
Ordinary Decent Criminal was released on DVD in the United States on 31 January 2003.
