= Spacejacked =

- Home video cover art
- Directed by: Jeremiah Cullinane
- Written by: Brendan Broderick; Daniella Purcell
- Produced by: Mary Ann Fisher
- Starring: Corbin Bernsen
- Music by: Siobhán Cleary
- Production companies: Concorde Anois; Concorde-New Horizons
- Distributed by: New Concorde
- Release date: 1997
- Countries: USA; Ireland
- Language: English

Spacejacked is a 1997 American-Irish film. It was made for Concorde Anois, a studio Roger Corman ran in Galway.

== Plot ==
In the near future, a spaceship on a luxury cruise to the moon is taken over by Barnes, an evil computer expert, who plants a bomb on the craft in an attempt to get all of the wealthy passengers' bank account numbers.

== Cast ==
- Corbin Bernsen as Barnes
- Bill Murphy as Jack
- Amanda Pays as Dawn
- Ciara O'Callaghan as Monica Miles
- Steve Bond as Taylor
