= The Haunting of Hell House =

1999 film by Mitch Marcus

- Directed by: Mitch Marcus
- Written by: Mitch Marcus; Lev L. Spiro
- Based on: The Ghostly Rental by Henry James
- Produced by: Roger Corman
- Starring: Michael York; Andrew Bowen; Claudia Christian
- Cinematography: Russ Brandt
- Edited by: Daniel H. Holland
- Music by: Ivan Koutikov
- Production company: New Concorde
- Distributed by: New Concorde
- Release date: November 16, 1999
- Running time: 90 minutes
- Countries: United States; Ireland
- Language: English

The Haunting of Hell House is a 1999 American-Irish supernatural horror film directed by Mitch Marcus and based on "The Ghostly Rental" by Henry James. The film is also known as Henry James' The Ghostly Rental and Henry James' The Haunting of Hell House.

== Plot ==
James Farrow (Andrew Bowen) is a young student who discovers his girlfriend is pregnant and in a panic, pressures her and forces her to an illegal abortion. However, James' lover dies during the abortion due to the negligence of the abortionist and he is left in a pit of grief and guilt. He begins seeing demonic, ghostly visions of his deceased girlfriend and begins to visit the house where they had first met. Unable to live in the state any longer, James requests the help and advice of Professor Ambrose, an eerie man whose life has been shattered by multiple tragedies and unfortunate events in his family. Professor Ambrose is also tormented by visions of his deceased daughter in the haunted house where spirits are restless and vengeful.

== Cast ==
- Michael York as Professor Ambrose
- Andrew Bowen as James Farrow
- Jason Cottle as Fletcher
- Claudia Christian as Lucy
- Aideen O'Donell as Sarah
- Brian Glanney as Jenkins
- Ciaran Davies as Graham
- Colm O'Maonlai as Reginald
- Mike Finn as Lieutenant Ryan
- Mitch Marcus as Professor Benest

== Production ==
In March 1998, the Merlin Film Fund issued a memo to investors seeking to raise more than E£1 million to make the film, then called The Ghostly Rental. The investment would be supported by loans from National Irish Bank and Ernst & Young would act as tax consultants on behalf of investors. To put in a maximum of IR£25,000 (E31,750), an investor was only required to pay IR£7,600 and the remainder would come from bank loans, which would then be repaid when the movie was produced. An individual could then write off 80% of the IR£25,000 against tax, leaving IR£9,600 repayable by the Irish tax authorities. After the initial investment of IR£7,600, this guaranteed a profit of IR£2,000.

The Department of Arts, Heritage, Gaeltacht and the Islands granted the section 481 certificate for The Ghostly Rental subject to strict guidelines. These included the stipulations that Irish crew would fill 19 senior positions among the 82 staff involved and that the company must produce audited accounts confirming "the direct expenditure on the employment of Irish personnel and on the purchase of Irish goods and services to be some IR£ 1,121,068".

The film was shot in Ireland at Concorde Anois, which was Roger Corman's studio in Galway, and went straight to video.

Irish tax authorities later sent demands to more than 1,000 investors claiming that Merlin Films Group failed to provide sufficient proof that the funds that it raised for the production of various movies in Ireland were spent in concurrence with the regulations governing the tax breaks.

== Reception ==
Brendan Kelly of Variety wrote that "Corman takes on Henry James and the results are just about what one might expect. [It] is indeed a B-movie spin on upscale Victorian Gothic, but it’s not quite the campy fun it could’ve been. There's a decent yarn lurking in here somewhere, though it's smothered by remarkably bad acting, much too dark lensing and leaden pacing. Lacking the requisite thrills 'n' spills to please the action crowd, this bloody ghost story will be a marginal video item at best."
