= Mike Finn (Irish playwright) =

Irish playwright and filmmaker

- Born: Ireland
- Education: IADT
- Occupations: Playwright & Television Writer
- Years active: 1990-Present
- Known for: The Church, Pigtown, Killinascully
- Awards: 3x Irish Film & Television Awards Nominee, Stewart Parker Award Winner

Mike Finn is an Irish playwright and filmmaker based in Limerick, Ireland. He graduated from the National Film School (IADT) with a Masters in scriptwriting and was also made an honorary fellow of the University of Iowa. In 2016, he became the first theatre artist to be in residence in The Belltable. Several of his plays cover local Limerick history.

== Career ==
Finn began his professional playwriting career in the early 1990s as a founding member of the Island Theatre Company, where he wrote several plays. His breakthrough came with The Crunch in 1992 (co-written) and his first major solo play, Pigtown, which premiered at Belltable in 1999. Additionally, this play won him the Stewart Parker Award Other works by Finn include The Quiet Moment, The Crunch and Shock & Awe, Stories, Langered and One, The Big Question, The Affair on the Square, We Are What We Witness, The Revenger's Tragedy, Porkville, Wreckquiem and Life in 2 Syllables.

In 2017, he wrote a historical play about the Irish Soviets, released in Belltable and Bread not Profit in 2019, performed in Cleeves factory. In 2025, Finn's play The Rising of the Women was released in collaboration with the GAFF. Finn has also written wrote scripts for pantomimes, including Aladdin and his Magic Lamp.

He started writing for television in 2006, working alongside Pat Shortt to co-write the television series Killinaskully.

== Awards ==
- Stewart Parker Trust Awards (2000): Won for his historical play Pigtown, which later played Off-Broadway and in San Jose.
- The Irish Times Irish Theatre Awards (2020): Won the Audience Choice Award for his site-specific play Bread Not Profits, documenting the 1919 Limerick Soviet.
- The Irish Times Irish Theatre Awards (2000): Received four nominations for Pigtown.
- Irish Film & Television Awards (IFTAs): Nominated as a co-writer with comedian Pat Shortt for the RTÉ television comedy series Killinaskully. He was nominated in 2004, 2005 and 2008.

== Playwright ==
- The Crunch (1992)
- Charlie Chaplin's Mother Was An Irish Man (1995)
- Pigtown (1999)
- The Quiet Moment (2002)
- Shock & Awe (2003)
- Ellis Island (2003)
- One (2006)
- The Revenger's Tragedy (2009)
- The Unlucky Cabin Boy (2015)
- Bread Not Profits (2019)
- Waiting for Poirot (2021)
- Blue Train (2024)
- Wreckquiem (2025)

== Short plays ==
- Porkville (2010)
- Life in 2 Syllables (2012)
- The Big Question (2014)
- The Affair on the Square (2016)
- Stories (2017)
- We Are What We Witness (2018)
- Langered (2019)

== Filmography ==
=== Screenwriter ===
- I'm From Limerick (2002)
- Killinascully (2005–2008)
- Inside the Crystal Ball (2009)
- Mattie (2009–2011)

=== Actor ===
- Star Portal as Otto (1997)
- My Brother's War as Special Security Man (1997)
- The Haunting of Hell House as Lt Ryan (1999)
- Cowboys & Angels as Raid Garda 2 (2003)
- Planetfall as Cast of Bastard and Commando (2005)
- Killinaskully as Sherlock Holmes, Raider 1, Mossie (2004–2008)
- Inside the Crystal Ball as Off Screen Reporter (2009)
- Mattie as Chicken 2 (2010)
- The Apparel as Suit Man (2016)
- Blue Lights as Charles (2021)
- Hidden Assets as Bar Owner (2021)

=== Additional filmography ===
- 1990: Faces of Death IV: Special Thanks
- 2026: Once Upon a Time in a Cinema: Adr Sound Recordist
