= Knocking on Death's Door =

1999 film by Mitch Marcus

- Directed by: Mitch Marcus
- Written by: Craig J. Nevius
- Produced by: Mary Ann Fisher executive Roger Corman
- Starring: David Carradine; Kimberly Rowe; Brian Bloom
- Production companies: Netriddge Limited; Concorde Anois
- Distributed by: New Concorde
- Release date: June 8, 1999
- Countries: United States; Ireland
- Language: English

Knocking on Death's Door is a 1999 American-Irish supernatural horror film.

== Plot ==
In a New England village, two newlywed students of the paranormal enter Hillside House to document the activities of a legion of ghosts. They uncover a murderous history that leads them into the clutches of a mysterious doctor.

== Cast ==
- David Carradine as Doc Hadley
- Kimberly Rowe as Danielle Gallagher
- Brian Bloom as Brad Gallagher
- John Doe as Professor Ballard

== Production ==
The film was shot for Concorde Anois at Roger Corman's studios near Galway.
