= Moving Target (2000 film) =

- Home video cover art
- Directed by: Paul Ziller
- Written by: Paul Ziller
- Produced by: Roger Corman
- Starring: Don "The Dragon" Wilson
- Production company: Concorde Anois
- Distributed by: New Concorde
- Release date: 2000
- Countries: Ireland, United States
- Language: English

Moving Target is a 2000 Irish/American exploitation action film directed by Paul Ziller starring Don "The Dragon" Wilson.

It stars Don "The Dragon" Wilson and was the last film Roger Corman made at Concorde Anois.

The film was remade as Fist of the Dragon (2015).

== Plot ==
A breakaway extremist group of IRA steals nuclear detonators hidden inside six glass bottles of Beamish. Meanwhile, an innocent tourist named Ray Brock (played by Don Wilson) arrives in Headford, Co. Galway to visit Alice, a woman whom he has been conversing with online. In order to win favour with Alice, Ray goes to a local pub to purchase a six-pack of Beamish. He accidentally purchases the same six-pack that the nuclear detonators are hidden in, and becomes embroiled in a cat-and-mouse chase between the IRA extremists, US intelligence and the Garda Síochána.

== Cast ==
- Don "The Dragon" Wilson as Ray Brock
- Bill Murphy as Mickey
- Eileen McCloskey as Alice Doyle
- Terry McMahon as Malloy
- Nuala Kelly as Lieutenant Brady
- Mick Nolan as Detective Stokes
- Stephen Holland as John
- Éamonn Draper as Mike
- Lisa Dwan as Kate
- Hillary Kavanagh as Shannon
- Sean Colgan as Parnell
- Luke Hayden as Sean
