= Bill Murphy (Irish actor) =

Irish actor (born 1963)

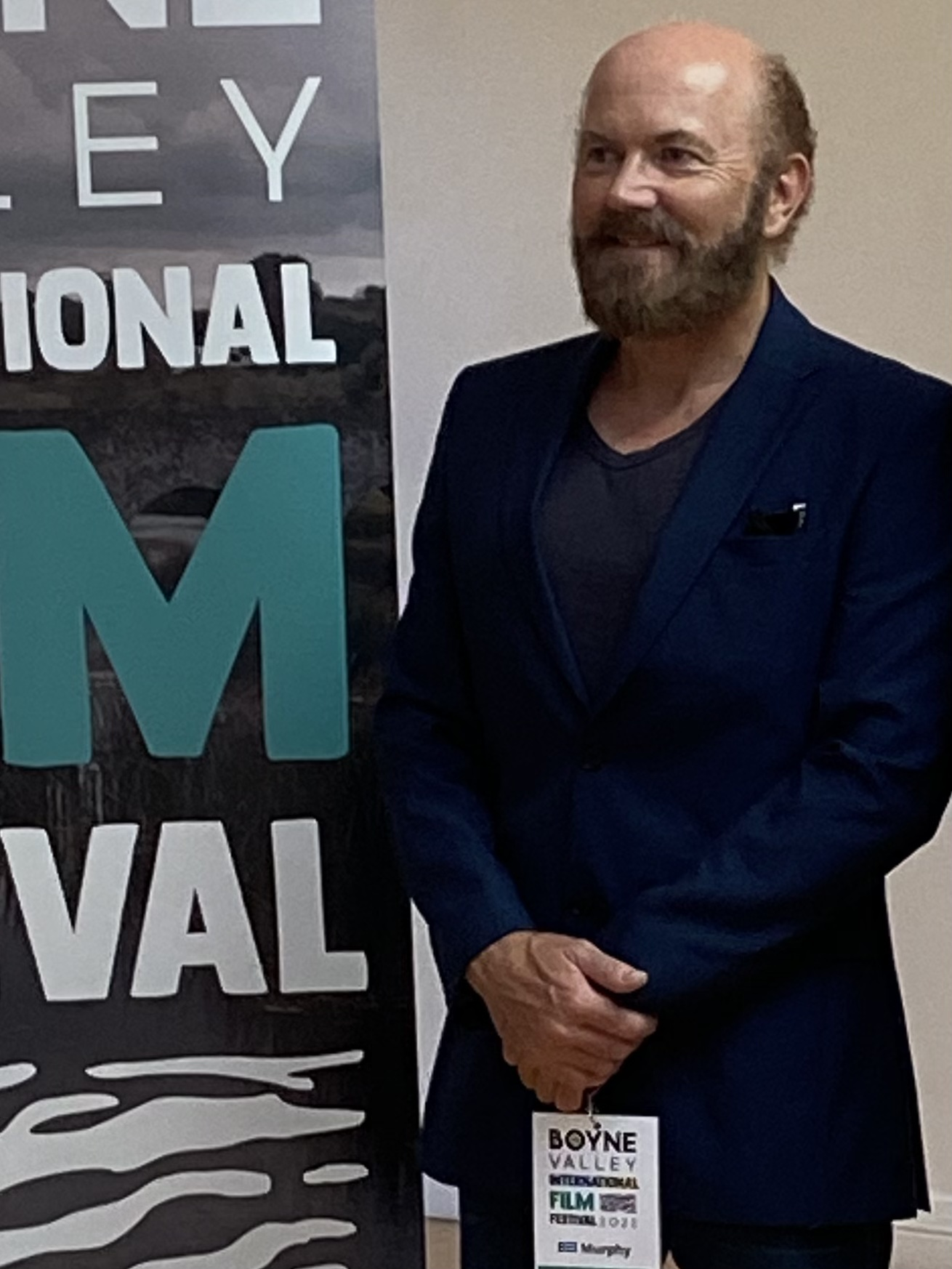
- Bill Murphy at the 2022 Boyne Valley International Film Festival
- Born: William A. Murphy; 14 February 1963 (age 63); Cork City, County Cork, Ireland
- Occupation: Actor
- Years active: 1994–present
- Spouse: Eileen O'Sullivan
- Children: 2

William A. Murphy (born 14 February 1963), better known as Bill Murphy, is an Irish theatre and screen actor, writer and producer. He has appeared in films such as Ordinary Decent Criminal (2000), My Brother's War (1997), Criminal Affairs (1997) and Moving Target (2000). He has also had roles in TV series such as Jack Taylor (2010), Titanic: Blood and Steel (2012), Vikings: Valhalla (2022) and The Gone (2023), and he portrayed Nick Barret on the RTÉ One soap opera Fair City in 2003. He has had roles in theatre and concert productions of Once (The Musical) (2015–2024), The Country Girls (2019), and Joyce's Women (2022). In 2022 he wrote, produced and starred in the short film Lily's Theme.

== Early life and education ==
Murphy was born William A. Murphy in Cork City, County Cork. He began his career in Cork while training with the Irish Opera Repertory Company before moving to Dublin to continue his training with the Focus Theatre.

== Career ==
=== Feature films ===
Murphy's feature film credits include Criminal Affairs (1997) starring Louis Mandylor and James Marshall, My Brother's War (1997) starring Josh and James Brolin, Ordinary Decent Criminal (2000) starring Kevin Spacey, Linda Fiorentino and Colin Farrell, Moving Target (2000) starring Don "The Dragon" Wilson, and The Cabin (2011) starring Steven Brand and Lea Thompson.

=== TV series ===
In 2003, Murphy portrayed the character Nick Barret in the RTÉ One soap opera Fair City. Murphy is also credited with roles in Jack Taylor (2010) starring Iain Glen and in Titanic: Blood and Steel (2012) with Kevin Zegers and Derek Jacobi. In 2022, Murphy featured as the character Øgda in Season 1 of the Netflix series Vikings: Valhalla, a spin-off of the popular TV Series Vikings by Michael Hirst. In 2023, Murphy appeared as Superintendent Walsh in the RTÉ and TVNZ coproduction of The Gone.

=== Theatre ===
Murphy has worked in numerous Irish theatres, notably The Gate Theatre, The Gaiety Theatre, The Olympia Theatre and The Abbey Theatre. He has had roles in stage productions of Jack and the Beanstalk (2000), Annie (2001),, The Chastitute (2001), The Plough and the Stars (2003), Sweeney Todd (2007), Beauty and the Beast (2008), Macbeth (2012) and Threepenny Opera (2013). From 2015 to 2017, Murphy portrayed the character 'Da' in the Dublin and Seoul productions of Once (The Musical) directed by John Tiffany. He later reprised this role in 2023 during the China Tour of Musical: Once directed by Dean Johnson, and again in 2024 during the Taiwan tour. In 2019, Murphy appeared in the national theatre production of Edna O'Brien's The Country Girls. In 2020, he featured in the Abbey Theatre productions Dear Ireland Continues. In September 2022, Murphy portrayed the character of Zozimus in the Abbey Theatre coproduction of Joyce's Women, written by Edna O'Brien.

=== Short films ===
In 2019, Murphy featured in the short film Close to Nothing at All directed by Lisa Maria Brockli. In 2022, Murphy wrote, produced and starred in the short film Lily's Theme, directed by Frank W. Kelly, which premiered at the Boyne Valley International Film Festival 2022.

== Personal life ==
Murphy is married to actress and singer Eileen O'Sullivan. They have two children.

== Selected filmography ==
- "Criminal Affairs" (1997) as Sherriff Madsen
- "Spacejacked" (1997) as Jack
- "My Brother's War" (1997) as Paddy
- "Ordinary Decent Criminal" (2000) as Barry
- "Moving Target" (2000) as Mickey
- "Jack Taylor" (2010, TV Series) as Ford
- "Titanic: Blood and Steel" (2012, TV Mini Series) as Bremner
- "Vikings: Valhalla" (2022, TV Series) as Øgda
- "The Gone" (2023, TV Series) as Superintendent Walsh
