= Michael B. Druxman =

American dramatist (1941–2025)

- Born: February 23, 1941
- Died: September 28, 2025 (aged 84)
- Occupations: Screenwriter, novelist
- Writing career
- Language: English
- Website: www.druxmanworks.com/home.html

Michael Barnett Druxman (February 23, 1941 – September 28, 2025) was an American screenwriter, active primarily in the 1990s. His scripts for B-movie producer Roger Corman include Cheyenne Warrior (1994) with Kelly Preston, Dillinger and Capone (1995) starring Martin Sheen and F. Murray Abraham and The Doorway (2000) with Roy Scheider, which he also directed.

Druxman was also the author of one-person plays, Lombard and Jolson.

Additionally, he was the author of several non-fiction works about Hollywood, its films and the people who make them, including Basil Rathbone: His Life and His Films, The Art of Storytelling: How To Write A Story... Any Story, Make It Again, Sam: A Survey of Movie Remakes, Miss Dinah Shore, plus the novels, Nobody Drowns in Mineral Lake, Shadow Watcher, Murder in Babylon, Jackie Goes to Dixie, and Dark Chasm.

His memoirs, My Forty-Five Years in Hollywood and How I Escaped Alive, were published in August 2010, by Bear Manor Media. Druxman died on September 28, 2025, at the age of 84.
