= Jack Taylor (TV series) =

Irish television series

- Genre: Crime drama
- Created by: Ken Bruen
- Written by: Marteinn Thorisson; Marcus Fleming
- Directed by: Stuart Orme
- Starring: Iain Glen; Killian Scott; Nora-Jane Noone; Siobhán O'Kelly; Paraic Breathnach; Jack Monaghan
- Composer: Colin Towns
- Country of origin: Ireland
- Original language: English
- No. of seasons: 3
- No. of episodes: 9

Production
- Executive producers: Ralph Christians; Richard Price; Dirk Schweitzer
- Producer: Clodagh Freeman
- Production locations: Galway, Ireland; Bremen, Germany
- Running time: 90–100 minutes
- Production company: Magna Films

Original release
- Network: TV3
- Release: 2 August 2010 – 1 December 2016

Jack Taylor is an Irish mystery television drama based on the novels by Ken Bruen. Set in Galway, it features Iain Glen in the eponymous role of Jack Taylor, a former officer with the Garda Síochána (national police) who becomes a "finder" (private investigator) after leaving the service; Taylor looks for clues others have overlooked, and knows the streets of his hometown like the back of his hand.

== Premise ==
Set in Galway, the series is based on Ken Bruen's crime novels and features Iain Glen as the leading character, Jack Taylor, an old-school detective, and a maverick who often drinks much more than is good for him. After he is sacked from the Gardaí (the Irish police force) for assaulting a politician he had stopped for a traffic violation, Jack begins to work as a private investigator, reluctantly taking on cases the police will not investigate. According to the series' voiceover, there are no private eyes in Ireland–"It's too close to being an informant – a dodgy concept". Jack soon realises his experience suits him in his new role. He is aided in his investigations by his contacts, including some of his former Gardaí colleagues, notably Officer Kate Noonan.

== Cast ==
- Iain Glen as Jack Taylor
- Killian Scott as Cody Farraher
- Nora-Jane Noone as Garda Kate Noonan (series 1–2)
- Siobhán O'Kelly as Garda Kate Noonan (series 3)
- Tara Breathnach as Anne Henderson (series 1)
- Frank O'Sullivan as Superintendent Clancy (series 1)
- Bill Murphy as Ford (series 1)
- Pádraic Breathnach as Father Malachy
- Jack Monaghan as Darragh Noonan (series 3)

== Background ==
The first Jack Taylor film, The Guards, received its television debut on Ireland's TV3 on 2 August 2010. It was later shown on Canvas in Belgium with Dutch subtitles, and received its first UK broadcast on Channel 5 on 21 February 2013. Following The Guards, two further films, The Pikemen and The Magdalene Martyrs, were recorded and aired in September 2011. In November 2011 the Irish Film and Television Network reported that a further two films, The Dramatist and Priest, were in production, and that Noone and Scott would once again join Glen, reprising their roles. Aaron Monaghan, Emma Eliza Regan and Gavin Drea would also join the cast. The Dramatist aired on TV3 on 3 March 2013, with Priest debuting a week later. Filming for Shot Down, the sixth episode of the series, and billed as the season one finale, began on 7 June 2013. The film is based on Bruen's novel The Killing of the Tinkers. Episodes 1 through 6 became available in the US on Netflix Streaming on 19 February 2014, episodes 7 through 9 as of 10 April 2017.

Iain Glen spoke to the Daily Record about his role as Taylor shortly before the series began airing in the UK in February 2013, saying the chance to pay homage to the 1970s film, Chinatown, had inspired him to take the part:

I've always fancied playing a private eye, ever since I saw Jack Nicholson play Jake Gittes in Chinatown. It is familiar territory but I think there are various aspects that individualize it. One is Ireland's west coast, which has a stunning coastline, and the town of Galway itself [...] The big advantage of taking stuff from books as well written as Ken Bruen's, is that he offers you fantastic dialogue. It's kind of Philip Marlowe with American, quick, dry one-liners all the way. It's lovely to play.

== Episodes ==
Series	Episodes	Originally released	
Series	Episodes	First released	Last released
1	3	2 August 2010	15 September 2011
2	3	3 March 2013	1 December 2013
3	3	17 November 2016	1 December 2016

=== Series 1 (2010–11) ===
No. overall	No. in series	Title	Directed by	Written by	Original release date
1	1	"The Guards"	Stuart Orme	Tom Collins, Anne McCabe & Ralph Christians	2 August 2010
Jack Taylor, a sergeant with the Gardaí Síochána, hands in his resignation after being told he would receive the boot for assaulting a politician that he caught speeding. When he is contacted by Anne Hennessy, a distraught mother whose daughter Sarah has supposedly disappeared, he agrees to use his skills as a 'private eye' to investigate her disappearance. After discovering that the girl may have become the latest in a series of suspicious deaths and disappearances in Galway, he seeks help from an old friend, Sutton, to investigate the case. After speaking with a group of young girls, Jack discovers that some of the victims were linked to a local factory, Planters, run by sleazy factory manager named Ford (Bill Murphy). When he discovers a collection of illegal sex videos, he realises that the revelations are only the beginning of his investigation. However, it soon transpires that Sutton (Ralph Brown) has alternative motives for wanting to work on the case.
2	2	"The Pikemen"	Stuart Orme	Marteinn Thorisson	1 September 2011
Upon returning to Galway, Jack is an approached by an old friend, O'Shea, whose son, Niall, was killed after falling from a balcony on a construction site. Jack agrees to look into the circumstances surrounding his death, and discovers that he may be connected to several other victims who were found dead in mysterious circumstances. When another man is attacked, Jack learns of a vigilante group known as 'The Pikemen', who appear to be attacking people who were supposedly unconvicted of the crimes that they were responsible for. Assisted by eager young investigator Cody, Jack discovers that Niall was suspected of being responsible for the disappearance of three twelve year old girls. Meanwhile, upon re-establishing contact with Anne Henderson, Jack finds her in an abusive relationship with a local businessman, Caffrey. When Caffrey turns up dead, a victim of the Pikemen, Jack is arrested. He realises that the only way to prove his innocence is to escape from custody, and he is forced to rely on Cody to clear his name.
3	3	"The Magdalen Martyrs"	Stuart Orme	Marteinn Thorisson	15 September 2011
Jack is hired by Maggie McCarthy, the daughter of a recently deceased former inmate at St Monica's, an infamous Magdalen laundry in Galway, who wishes to identify the sadistic nun mentioned in her mother's diary, known only as Lucifer. The investigation is quickly hampered when Cody discovers that incriminating church records have vanished; while Jack is warned to drop the case by local criminal, Bill Cassell. As the diary reveals the depth of Lucifer's brutality, Jack discovers a 50-year-old family secret that leads him to the nun's identity, and an unexpected connection to the recent deaths of two brothers, the sons of local patriarch Brendan Flood. When Jack is threatened by Cassell, he is forced to hand over the diary. Realising that it is the only piece of evidence which could lead him to Lucifer, and remembering that he promised Maggie that he would guard it with his life, he sets out to get it back – with tragic consequences. Kate is forced to once again suppress evidence from the crime scene in order to ensure Jack's freedom – but will he discover the link between the cases before the killer strikes again?

=== Series 2 (2013) ===
No. overall	No. in series	Title	Directed by	Written by	Original release date
4	1	"The Dramatist"	Stuart Orme	Marcus Fleming	3 March 2013
Seven months after his mother's stroke, and continuing on his path of sobriety and healthier living, Jack is called on to investigate the death of a female university student, Sarah Bradley, who has fallen from a roof while dressed in theatre costume. A ring of paper around her wrist contains an apparent suicide note written in her blood, and Gardaí assume the death to be drug related. Jack is hired by university professor Eugene Gorman to investigate the case, suspecting that the girl was murdered. Jack sends Cody undercover, posing as a university student, to gather information on Bradley's fellow students, as well as one particularly suspicious tutor, Professor Doyle. Meanwhile, Kate has a new boss, DS Griffin, who is overseeing her promotion into a detective. Griffin, however, is less than pleased with Kate's association with Jack and warns him to stay clear of Kate – and the investigation. When a second girl is found dead in similar circumstances, the owner of a local bookshop, who deals in heroin, becomes prime suspect.
5	2	"Priest"	Stuart Orme	Marteinn Thorisson	10 March 2013
Jack is hired by Father Malachy to investigate the death of a priest, Father Royce, who has been beheaded. He discovers the cleric abused two boys, Michael Clare and Tom Reed, several years earlier. Shortly after being interviewed, Tom Reed is found dead in the bath of a suspected heroin overdose. Jack initially suspects that Reed may have been targeted by a relative of a young boy whom he raped ten years ago, but when he finds a note identical to the one left at the scene of Father Royce's murder, he suspects that Reed met his fate at the hands of the same killer. Upon checking Reed's bank statements, Jack discovers he was receiving regular payments of £2,000 from an unknown account. As Clare's behaviour continues to become more and more erratic, Jack discovers that he was responsible for the rape that Reed was convicted of. As Jack begins to drift back into his old ways, and discovers more of his own demons, Cody decides to do a little covert digging of his own – but it leads him right into the path of the killer.
6	3	"Shot Down"	Stuart Orme	Marteinn Thorisson	1 December 2013
Riddled with guilt after Cody's shooting, Jack leaves Galway, and after six months on the road, finds himself in Dublin. Whilst meeting with a client one evening to provide him with some surveillance photos, Jack finds a young girl, Rosie, covered in blood, who claims to have witnessed her mother being murdered. Her mother, Sinead Mangan, is later found dead with a shotgun wound to the head. Moving himself into the local traveller community, Jack becomes embroiled in a long-standing feud between the Kelly and Mangan families. As he tries to help Rosie recall the events of the tragic night, he discovers that Rosie's father, Eddie, is connected to well known Dublin crime kingpin Bridie Hannigan. But when Eddie is later murdered in an arson attack, Jack realises that Rosie may have been the intended victim. When Rosie disappears, Jack manages to track her down to a deserted workshop in the Dublin hills. With a little help from Kate, he finally manages to get her to open up – but it's not long before the killer comes calling.

=== Series 3 (2016) ===
No. overall	No. in series	Title	Directed by	Written by	Original release date
7	1	"Cross"	Stuart Orme	Marteinn Thorisson	17 November 2016
A young man is found crucified, and Kate asks Jack to meet with the victim's mother, who is not satisfied with the direction of the police inquiry. Cody is moving to Boston with Sheena. Darragh, Kate's cousin, becomes Jack's assistant. Kate has a medical issue. Original title was "Cross".
8	2	"Headstone"	Stuart Orme	Marteinn Thorisson	24 November 2016
A troubled young man is kidnapped, seemingly for ransom from his wealthy parents, who have hired for the case a cocky London investigator (Christopher Fulford). When the victim's severed finger is separately sent to his girlfriend, she approaches Jack for help – even though the man and Jack have some very murky shared history. In the meantime, Kate has to face a personal struggle of her own. Original title was "Headstone".
9	3	"Purgatory"	Charlie McCarthy	Marteinn Thorisson	1 December 2016
While still dealing with the fallout from the previous episode's events, both Jack and Kate become involved with investigating the murder of a young intern who worked at the Irish branch of a large American game software company.

== Reception ==
Bernice Harrison of The Irish Times gave the first film, The Guards, a mixed reception.

Stylishly filmed by director of photography John Conroy, its cool, contemporary atmosphere was spoiled by the corny device of periodically giving Taylor a voiceover, improbably turning the ex-guard in Galway with a drink problem into an old-style gumshoe in a film noir. Perhaps if it had been just an hour long instead of feature-length, director Stuart Orme would have insisted on a tighter script, been sharper with his edits and made a better drama. The book deserved it and grizzly Jack Taylor is a strong enough character to hang it – or for that matter, a series – on.

She was far less positive about the following two films in 2011, finding Glen's Irish accent to be unconvincing.

TV3 is showing two more Jack Taylor investigations...and they are even worse than The Guards...The dramas are a mostly German production – filmed partially in Bremen, which may or may not look like Galway – and there's a touch of the Oirish about the whole thing, and not just because Taylor's weapon of choice is a hurley. Glenn [sic], who in The Guards couldn't quite settle on an accent, has now decided to channel Clint Eastwood: his voice is a husky American-tinged drawl that wouldn't have gone down too well in Templemore.

Keith Watson of Metro felt The Guards had several problems, but that Glen had rescued it.

Sidestepping gumshoe cliché, Glen gave Taylor a world-weary charisma that lifted him above the odd story he found himself in from failure. A mixed-up yarn involving a dodgy old artist mate, a spot of under-age sex, a femme fatale and some sideswipes at the state of the Irish economy, the plot buckled under its baffling lack of logic. But Glen, peering at the world through Taylor's boozed-up eyes, lent the action a credibility and mystery it scarcely deserved.

David Jenkins of Time Out was more positive about The Guards, although he felt there was nothing new in the storyline.

It's all very clichéd, from the wiseacre patter to the generic chase scene through a strangely empty warehouse. But who's complaining when the clichés are thrown together with this much tenderness and panache?

David Stephenson of the UK's Daily Express praised the episode's opening sequence.

The first few minutes of this new feature-length drama confirmed in my mind that I was going to enjoy the next 90 minutes. For a start it began with a car chase after Jack had taken a requisite large slug of booze.

Reviewing The Pikemen following its British television debut, the Radio Times's David Butcher was generally positive, praising Glen for his portrayal of the central character.

It's not the paciest of crime thrillers but Iain Glen makes Jack the kind of doleful, rugged character you want to keep watching and the story has the right kind of rough edges.

Phil Harrison of Time Out called the second film, "surprisingly enjoyable", but echoed Jenkins's concerns about plot. "[T]he familiar scenarios are at least played out with appropriate relish and conviction and Glen's excellently gnarly in the lead. Daft, grimy fun."

Reviewing the DVD release of the first three films, The Independent's Ben Walsh gave it three out of five stars, saying Iain Glen "convinces as damaged Jack Taylor, an alcoholic former cop who now works as a Galway gumshoe."

In March 2013, The Guardian's Laura Barnett spoke to Tim Burchell, a real-life private investigator from Private Investigator London, who had a mixed opinion of the series. Burchell told Barnett:

The first time I tried to watch this, I turned it off after 20 minutes. I just couldn't stand all the cliches: the heavy-drinking, loner ex-cop. That's not who I am at all [...] I enjoyed it much more the second time. It does show all the groundwork we have to put in: people think we sit and type names into Google, but we're out there, pounding the streets. And although I've never taken on a murder case, as Taylor does, missing-person cases are our bread and butter."

He also felt that such shows can give a misleading view of his occupation. "Shows like this are great entertainment, but they do give people the wrong idea."

== DVD releases ==
Lumière released the first five episodes on DVD with Dutch subtitles on 29 January 2013. Acorn Media released the first three episodes on DVD in the UK on 4 March 2013.

Australia Region 4 Releases
DVD title	Region 4 (Australia)
Jack Taylor: Series One	3 June 2015
Jack Taylor: Series Two	1 October 2014
Jack Taylor: Series Three	16 December 2016
Jack Taylor: Series One-Three	2 August 2017
