= Cleo King =

American character actress (born 1962)

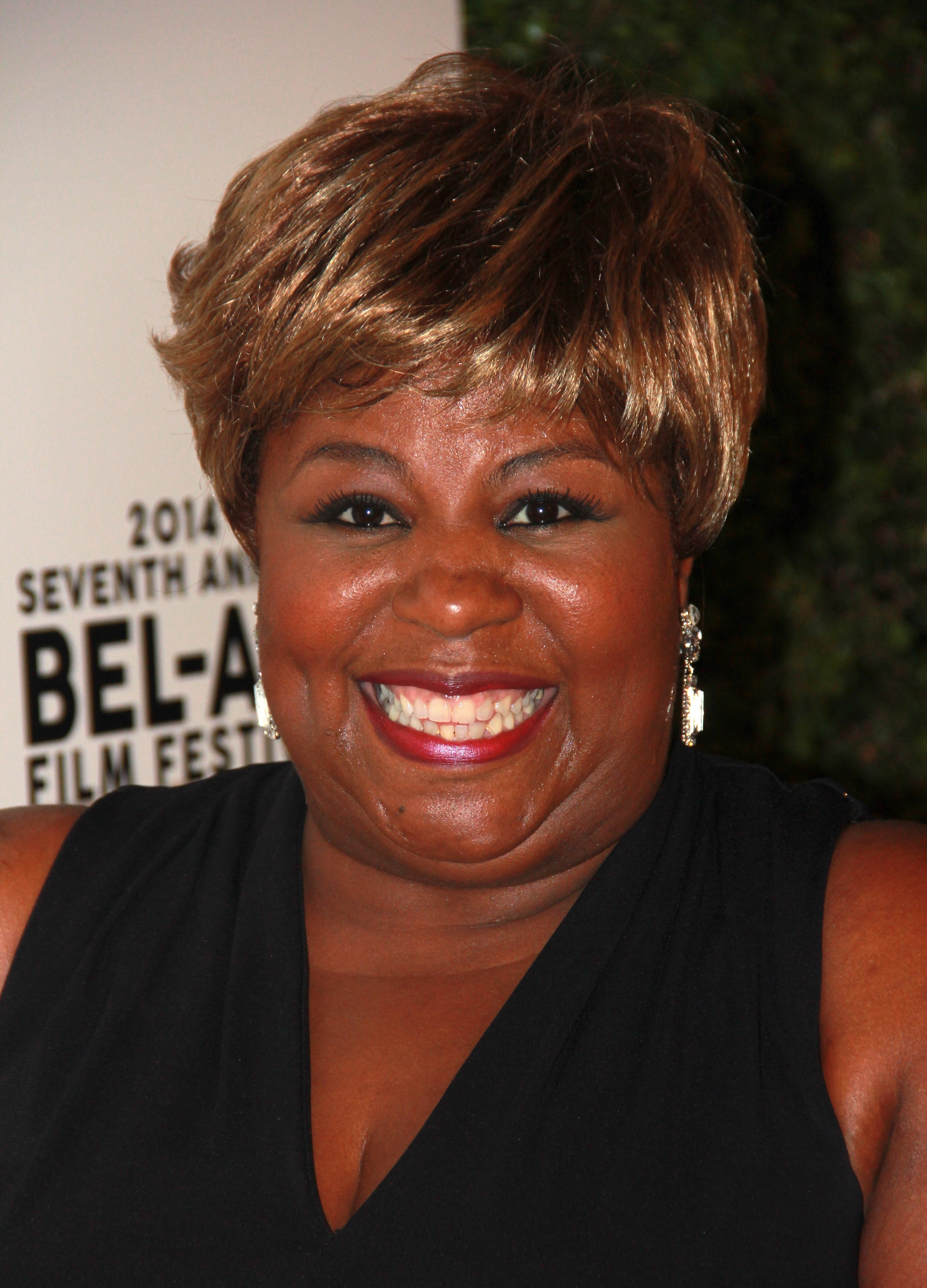
- King at the 2014 Seventh Annual Bel Air Film Festival at the Saban Theatre in Beverly Hills
- Born: August 21, 1962 (age 64); St. Louis, Missouri, U.S
- Education: University of Missouri
- Occupations: Actress; singer
- Years active: 1988–present

Cleo King (born August 21, 1962) is an American actress. She is best known for her roles on television, particularly her series-regular supporting turn as Grandma in Mike & Molly (2010–2016), and a number of notable films such as Magnolia (1999) and The Hangover (2009).

== Early life ==
King was born in St. Louis, Missouri, and was the youngest of seven children. She graduated from University of Missouri and later moved to New York to pursue an acting career, first appearing in theatre productions.

== Career ==
In the mid-1990s, King moved to Los Angeles, California, and began appearing on television shows such as The Wayans Bros., Living Single, Malcolm & Eddie, Murphy Brown, and Any Day Now. She also appeared on Friends as a nurse.

King has appeared in a number of films, playing small parts, include Magnolia (1999), Dude, Where's My Car? (2000), Bubble Boy (2001), The Life of David Gale (2003), Dreamgirls (2006), Pineapple Express (2008), The Hangover (2009), Valentine's Day (2010), and Transformers: Age of Extinction (2014). She guest-starred on more than 50 shows, including NYPD Blue, Ally McBeal, Six Feet Under, The West Wing, CSI: Crime Scene Investigation, NCIS, and Ugly Betty.

From 2001 to 2002, King had a recurring role as Helene Parks in the Fox drama series Boston Public, created by David E. Kelley. In 2003, she co-starred in the short-lived CBS drama The Brotherhood of Poland, New Hampshire, also created by Kelley. In 2006, she played Aunt Lou in the HBO drama series Deadwood during its third and final season. In 2009, King had the recurring role as Neeta, the nanny of Jax Teller's son in the FX drama series, Sons of Anarchy.

In 2010, King was cast in the series regular role as grandmother Rosetta "Nana" McMillan in the CBS sitcom Mike & Molly, even though she is only seven years older than Reno Wilson (who played her grandson, Carl).

In 2017 she appeared regularly in Netflix's adaptation of A Series of Unfortunate Events, which premiered in 2017. That same year she appeared as Mrs. Watkins in the film The Bye Bye Man.

On February 22, 2021, King made a cameo appearance in season 2, episode 6 of Fox's 9-1-1: Lone Star. She portrayed Paul Strickland's mother, Cynthia Strickland.

== Filmography ==
=== Film ===
Year	Title	Role	Notes
1993	Six Degrees of Separation	Lieutenant Price	
1997	White Lies	Alice	
1997	Touch Me	Gloria Kinney	
1999	Magnolia	Marcie	
2000	Road Trip	Tina	
2000	Dude, Where's My Car?	Officer Clark	
2001	Bubble Boy	Minister Walsh	
2002	Waking Up in Reno	June	
2003	National Security	June	
2003	The Life of David Gale	Barbara Kreuster	
2003	Dogville	Olivia	
2003	Dogville Confessions	Herself	Documentary
2006	The Benchwarmers	Martha	
2006	Hood of Horror	Susan	
2006	Dreamgirls	Janice	
2007	Towelhead	Marlene	
2008	Pineapple Express	Police Liaison Officer Harris	
2008	Sex Drive	Sonya	
2009	The Hangover	Officer Garden	
2010	Valentine's Day	TSA Supervisor Daisy Bell	
2011	Demoted	Betty	
2012	The Obama Effect	Rebecca Thomas	
2014	Just Before I Go	Berta	
2014	Transformers: Age of Extinction	Mary Jo McGatlin	
2017	The Bye Bye Man	Mrs. Watkins	
2019	Justine	Cynthia	
2021	Ride the Eagle	Missy	
2026	The Dink	Gail	

=== Television ===
Year	Title	Role	Notes
1988	The Cosby Show	Cleo	Episode: "If the Dress Fits, Wear It"
1996	The Wayans Bros.	Ethel	Episode: "Getting It"
1996	Living Single	Geraldine	Episode: "Wake Up to the Breakup"
1997	Hangin' with Mr. Cooper	Vivia	Episode: "The Argument"
1997	Hitz	Sabrina	Episode: "It Ain't Over Till..."
1997	413 Hope St.	Adele	2 episodes
1997–1998	Murphy Brown	Marsha	3 episodes
1998	Michael Hayes	Augusta Miller	Episode: "Mob Mentality"
1998	Malcolm & Eddie	Aunt Ruby	Episode: "Mixed Nuts"
1998	Promised Land	Teresa Landover	Episode: "Total Security"
1998	Night Man	Buddy's Mother	Episode: "Amazing Grace"
1999	Border Line	Patricia	Television film
1999	Becker	Mrs. Davis	Episode: "Saving Harvey Cohen"
2000	The Jamie Foxx Show	Valencia	Episode: "Partner fo' Life"
2000	Happily Ever After: Fairy Tales for Every Child	Nana / Servant Woman #2 (voice)	Episode: "The Princess and the Pauper"
2000	Zoe, Duncan, Jack and Jane	Helen	Episode: "Kiss of Death"
2000	ER	Mrs. Davies	Episode: "Viable Options"
2001	Diagnosis: Murder	Nurse Sonya	Episode: "Sins of the Father: Part 1"
2001	Gilmore Girls	Esther	Episode: "Concert Interruptus"
2001	Strong Medicine	Claudia Falder	Episode: "Mortality"
2001	NYPD Blue	Helena	Episode: "Dying to Testify"
2001	Ally McBeal	Ms. Parks	Episode: "Queen Bee"
2001–2002	Boston Public	Helene Parks	9 episodes
2002	Charmed	Tanya - Juror	Episode: "Trial by Magic"
2002	The Bernie Mac Show	Cheryl	Episode: "Handle Your Business"
2002	Six Feet Under	Life	Episode: "In the Game"
2002	Friends	Nurse Kitty	Episode: "The One Where No One Proposes"
2002	MDs	Leticia	Episode: "A La Casa"
2003	The Brotherhood of Poland, New Hampshire	Francine Hill	7 episodes
2004, 2005	The West Wing	Marla Worisky	2 episodes
2005	Monk	911 Operator Davis	Episode: "Mr. Monk and the Kid"
2005	CSI: Crime Scene Investigation	Lucy	Episode: "Compulsion"
2005	NCIS	Della Robinson	Episode: "An Eye for an Eye"
2006	So Notorious	Nanny	8 episodes
2006	Deadwood	Aunt Lou Marchbanks	9 episodes
2006	Ugly Betty	Anne Fraiser	Episode: "Fey's Sleigh Ride"
2006	Numbers	Jenine	Episode: "Longshot"
2007	According to Jim	Suzanne	Episode: "In Case of Jimergency"
2007	Lost	Tamara Fry	Episode: "The Man from Tallahassee"
2007	Bones	Minister Sheila	Episode: "Stargazer in a Puddle"
2008	Eli Stone	Deborah Brehe	Episode: "Heal the Pain"
2009	Sons of Anarchy	Neeta	2 episodes
2010	American Dad!	Brenda's Cousin (voice)	Episode: "Bully for Steve"
2010	It's Always Sunny in Philadelphia	Nurse Wendy	Episode: "Dee Gives Birth"
2010	Rex Is Not Your Lawyer	Mable Howard	Episode: "Pilot"
2010–2016	Mike & Molly	Grandma	57 episodes
2012	I'm Not Dead Yet	Bev	Television film
2012	Family Guy	(voice)	Episode: "Jesus, Mary and Joseph!"
2014	Jennifer Falls	Ronnie	2 episodes
2014	New Girl	Sergeant Dorado	Episode: "Background Check"
2015	The Big Leaf	Parole Officer Marva	Television film
2015	Young & Hungry	Madame Paulette	Episode: "Young & Earthquake"
2016	Fresh Off the Boat	Judge Patty O'Brien	Episode: "The Taming of the Dads"
2016, 2018	Dream Corp LLC	General Jim Joynose Jr.	2 episodes
2017	American Koko	Foxy	3 episodes
2017–2018	A Series of Unfortunate Events	Eleanora Poe	6 episodes
2018	Shameless	Registrar	Episode: "The Fugees"
2018	Young Sheldon	Mrs. Costello	Episode: "A Mother, a Child, and a Blue Man's Backside"
2018	Mom	Sandy	Episode: "Puzzle Club and a Closet Party"
2019	Deadwood: The Movie	Aunt Lou Marchbanks	Television film
2019	Grey's Anatomy	Robin	3 episodes
2020	Hoops	Opal Lowry (voice)	10 episodes
2021	9-1-1: Lone Star	Cynthia Strickland	Episode: "Everyone and Their Brother"
2023	Minx	Evelyn	Episode: "This Is Our Zig"
2025	Electric Bloom	Georgie	Episode: "How We Learned to Love Our Haters"
