= Concorde Anois =

1990s Irish film production company

Concorde Anois was a short lived film production company based in Ireland that operated in the late 1990s. It was an offshoot of Roger Corman's Concorde Pictures. Anois is the Irish language word for 'now'.

== History ==
Corman was invited to set up operations in Ireland by the Irish government, keen to develop filmmaking in the west of the country. He built studios in Connemara, County Galway. He received a start-up grant from Minister for Arts, Culture and the Gaeltacht, Michael D. Higgins.

Around twenty films were made, using Irish crew and actors. They were mostly in exploitation genres such as action adventure, suspense thrillers, science fiction, and horror

The assistance provided by the Irish government became controversial when the content of some Corman productions such as Criminal Affairs was criticised in the press.

A documentary was later made about the studio called It Came from Connemara!.

== Films ==
- Star Portal (1996) – starring Athena Massey and Steven Bauer (science fiction)
- Bloodfist VIII Trained to Kill (1996) – starring Don "The Dragon" Wilson (action)
- Escape to Nowhere (1996) aka House of the Damned aka Spectre – with Alexandra Paul, Greg Evigan (horror)
- Spacejacked (1997) – with Corbin Bernsen and Amanda Pays (science fiction)
- Criminal Affairs (1997) – with James Marshall and Luis Mandylor, directed by Jeremiah Cullinane (thriller)
- Knocking on Death's Door (1999) – with David Carradine and Brian Bloom (horror)
- Criminal Pursuit (1997) aka Shadow of a Scream aka The Unspeakable – with Timothy Busfield, Athena Massey, and David Chokachi (action)
- Angela Mooney Dies Again (1998) – starring Mia Farrow and Brendan Gleeson (not a Corman production; just used facilities)
- The Haunting of Hell House (1998) – starring Michael York based on a story by Henry James (horror)
- A Very Unlucky Leprechaun (1998) – with Warwick Davis (children's)
- Stray Bullet (1998) – with Robert Carradine (action)
- Stray Bullet II (1998) aka Dangerous Curves – with Robert Carradine and David Carradine (action)
- Flashpoint (1998) aka My Brother's War – starring James Brolin and Jennie Gath, directed by James Brolin (thriller)
- White Pony (1999) – starring Warwick Davis (children's film)
- The Doorway (1999) – starring Roy Scheider (horror)
- Warlock III: The End of Innocence (1999) – starring Bruce Payne (horror)
- The Suicide Club (1999) – starring Jonathan Pryce and Paul Bettany, based on a story by Robert Louis Stevenson (horror)
- Moving Target (2000) – starring Don "The Dragon" Wilson (action)
