= My Brothers =

2010 Irish film

- Theatrical film poster
- Directed by: Paul Fraser
- Written by: Will Collins
- Produced by: Rebecca O'Flanagan; Robert Walpole
- Starring: Tim Creed; Paul Courtney; T.J. Griffin; Don Wycherley; Kate Ashfield; Sarah Greene
- Cinematography: P.J. Dillon
- Edited by: Emer Reynolds
- Music by: Richard James
- Release dates: October 11, 2010 (Mill Valley); August 17, 2012 (Ireland)
- Running time: 87 mins.
- Country: Ireland
- Language: English

My Brothers is a 2010 Irish coming-of-age drama film, directed by Paul Fraser and written by Will Collins. It stars Tim Creed, Paul Courtney, T.J. Griffin, Don Wycherley, Kate Ashfield, and Sarah Greene. It premiered at the 2010 Mill Valley Film Festival, before being subsequently released in Ireland in 2012.

== Cast ==
- Tim Creed as Noel
- Paul Courtney as Paudie
- T.J. Griffin as Scwally
- Don Wycherley as Dad
- Kate Ashfield as Kitty
- Sarah Greene as Rose
- Terry McMahon as Charlie
- Eamonn Hunt as Tommy
- Aidan O'Hare as Bob
- Siobhan Palmer as Emer

== Reception ==
Metacritic, which uses a weighted average, assigned the film a score of 51 out of 100, based on 4 critics, indicating "mixed or average" reviews.

In a positive 3.5/5 star review, Amber Wilkinson of Eye for Film called the film "a charmer" and elaborated that "its emotional resonance stuck with me". Boyd Van Hoeij of Variety said it "finds the right balance of humor, drama, and genuine pathos".

Meanwhile, Howard Feinstein of Screen Daily lauded the performances of the three children. But Joseph Jon Lanthier of Slant Magazine chided the film for its lack of plot, stating "the film quickly becomes all subtext, no story".
