= Criminal Affairs =

1997 American thriller film

- Directed by: Jeremiah Cullinane
- Written by: Charles Morrison Pickett
- Produced by: Mary Ann Fisher executive Roger Corman; Lance H Robbins co producer John Brady; Rachel Samuels; Edward G Reilly
- Cinematography: Laurence Manly
- Edited by: Folmer Wiesinger
- Production company: Concorde Anois
- Distributed by: Concorde Pictures
- Release date: 1997
- Countries: USA; Ireland
- Language: English

Criminal Affairs is a 1997 American thriller film. It was shot in Ireland at Roger Corman's studios near Galway.

== Cast ==
- Louis Mandylor as Clint Barker
- James Marshall as Mark
- Renee Allman as Robin
- Bill Murphy as Sheriff Madsen

== Production ==
Jeremiah Cullinane had worked as first assistant director for a number of productions for Corman. They had difficulties finding someone who would direct Criminal Affairs so they offered the job to Cullinane.

== Reception ==
The film premiered at the Galway Film Festival. The screening was controversial as some press claimed the film was semi pornographic, attracting controversy because Roger Corman's studio was financed with government money.
