= Terry McMahon =

Irish director, writer, and actor

- Born: Mullingar, Ireland
- Occupations: Actor, Director, Producer, Writer, Acting Coach
- Years active: 1997–present

Terry McMahon is an Irish director, producer, writer, actor, and acting coach best known for his roles in Batman Begins and Patrick's Day.

McMahon was producer, director and writer for Patrick's Day for which he received an award for Best Script at the 2015 Irish Film and Television Awards.

== Early life ==
McMahon was born in Mullingar, Ireland in 1970.

== Career ==
Terry started acting in 1997 playing the villain Terence Cooney on the RTE Soap Fair City, and in 2007 began his director, writer and producer career.

He directed the film Patrick's Day released in 2014. His best known acting role was in Batman Begins in 2005.

Terry is also an acting coach and gives acting classes in Dublin.

== Filmography ==
=== Film and television ===
Actor
Year	Title	Role	Notes
1997	Bolt	Neville	Short film
1998	Criminal Affairs	Deputy 1	Film
2000	The Suicide Club	Pratt	Film
2000	Dangerous Curves	Dorf	Film
2000	Moving Target	Malloy	Film
2005	Batman Begins	Bad Swat Cop	Film
2010	The Guards	The Watcher	TV series
2010	My Brothers	Charlie	Film
2011	Averity TV	Himself	TV mini series
2014	Bollywood to Hollywood	Guest	TV series
2022	That Dirty Black Bag	Blaine	TV series

=== Writer ===
Writer
Year	Title	Notes
2007-2010	Fair City	TV series (Writer 86 episodes)
2011	Charlie Casanova	(Written by)
2014	Patrick's Day	Film (Writer)

=== Director ===
Director
Year	Title	Notes
2011	Charlie Casanova	
2014	Patrick's Day	Film (Director)
2020	The Prizefighter	Film (Director)

=== Producer ===
Producer
Year	Title	Notes
2011	Charlie Casanova	Producer

=== Thanks ===
Thanks
Year	Title	Notes
2008	Anton (2008 film)	Special thanks
2008	Derelict	Thanks
2014	Jack and Ralph Plan a Murder	Thanks
2015	Positive Discrimination	Thanks (Short-film)

== Awards and nominations ==
Year	Award	Category	Result	Work
2011	SXSW Film Festival	Grand Jury - Best Narrative Feature	Nominated	Charlie Casanova
2012	Irish Film and Television Awards	Best Film, Best Director Film, Best Script for Film	Nominated	Charlie Casanova
2014	Galway Film Fleadh	Best Irish Feature Film	Won	Patrick's Day
2014	Cork Film Festival	International	Won	Patrick's Day
2014	Woodstock Film Festival	Best Feature Film	Won	Patrick's Day
2015	Irish Film and Television Awards	Best Director - Film	Nominated	Patrick's Day
2015	Irish Film and Television Awards	Best Script - Film	Won	Patrick's Day
