= Richard Flood =

Irish actor (born 1982)

- Born: 28 July 1982 (age 44); Dublin, Ireland
- Occupation: Actor
- Years active: 2010–present
- Spouse: Gabriella Pession (m. 2016)
- Children: 1

Richard Flood (born 28 July 1982) is an Irish actor best known for the character Tommy McConnel in the series Crossing Lines, James McKay in the series Red Rock, Ford in the series Shameless, and starred as Dr. Cormac Hayes on Grey's Anatomy (2019–2022).

== Career ==
Richard Flood portrayed the role of Samuel Johanson in an episode of the series Titanic: Blood and Steel in 2012. He joined the main cast of the television series Crossing Lines in 2013, playing detective Tommy McConnel, a specialist in weapons and tactics from Ireland, until 2014. That next year, in 2015, Flood joined the main cast of the series Red Rock, where he played the police superintendent James McKay. In 2017, it was announced that Flood would be cast as Ford in the Showtime series Shameless. He became a series regular ahead of the ninth season. In 2019, Flood was cast in a recurring role as Dr. Cormac Hayes on ABC's Grey's Anatomy. He was promoted to star for the 2020–21 season.

Flood appears alongside Acushla-Tara Kupe in TVNZ+'s crime drama, The Gone, released on 7 May 2023.

== Personal life ==
In 2012, Flood began dating Italian actress Gabriella Pession, and the two became engaged in 2014. Shortly after, they announced that they were expecting their first child, Giulio Flood, born that same year. On 3 September 2016, Flood married Pession in Italy.

== Filmography ==
=== Film ===
Year	Title	Role	Notes
2011	Solo	Benji	Short
2013	Taking the Boat	Danny	Short
2017	The Unseen	Will Shields	

=== Television ===
Year	Title	Role	Notes
2010	Three Wise Women	Peter	Television film
2012	Titanic: Blood and Steel	Samuel Johanson	Episode: "The Tipping Point"
2013	Killing Kennedy	Kenny O'Donnell	Television film (National Geographic)
2013–2014	Crossing Lines	Tommy McConnell	Main role (seasons 1–2)
2015–2016	Red Rock	Garda Superintendent James McKay	Main role (series 1)
2017–2019	Shameless	Ford Kellogg	Recurring role (season 8); Main role (season 9)
2019	Made in Italy	Jerry	Episode #1.8
2019–2022	Grey's Anatomy	Dr. Cormac Hayes	Recurring role (season 16); Main role (seasons 17–18); 35 episodes
2023–2024	The Gone	Theo Richter	Main role
2026	House of the Dragon	Ser Edgar	4 episodes
